= List of songs written by Charli XCX =

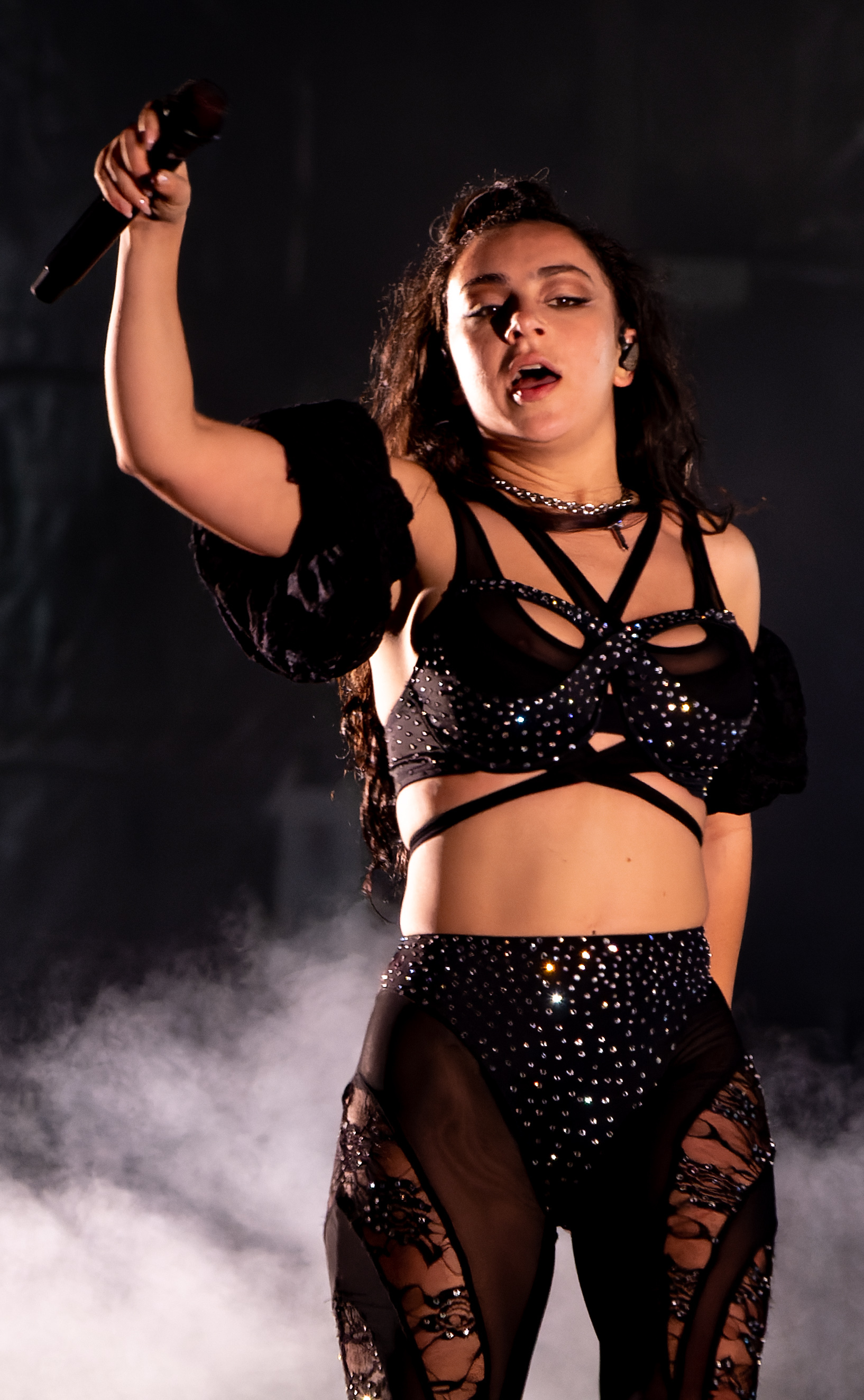
Charli XCX performing in 2022.

British singer Charli XCX has written tracks on her eight studio albums, four mixtapes, three extended plays, and has written songs for other singers. She started her career with her self-written and produced small-distribution debut 14 in 2008. Charli XCX had her big break through Swedish duo Icona Pop's single, "I Love It", as the vocalist and co-songwriter.

Charli XCX released her debut studio album, True Romance in 2013, followed by Sucker a year later. In 2016, Charli XCX released her third extended play, Vroom Vroom. She released two mixtapes in 2017, Number 1 Angel and Pop 2, the latter receiving universal acclaim from music critics, being ranked fortieth by Pitchfork in the list of "The 200 Best Albums of the 2010s".

Charli XCX began working on her third studio album from 2015 to 2017. The initial third studio album was delayed multiple times before ultimately leaking in August 2017, causing its release to be cancelled. The album would initially include singles "After the Afterparty" and "Boys". Charli XCX then worked on a new project, eventually released as her third studio album Charli in 2019. She then worked on and released her fourth studio album, How I'm Feeling Now, during the COVID-19 lockdown. Charli XCX released her fifth studio album, titled Crash on 18 March 2022. In June 2024, Charli XCX released her sixth studio album, Brat. She released the remix album, Brat and It's Completely Different but Also Still Brat in October 2024. On 13 February 2026, Charli XCX released an accompanying soundtrack album to Emerald Fennell's romantic period drama film Wuthering Heights (2026). In July 2026, she released her eighth studio album Music, Fashion, Film, which features production by her longtime collaborators A. G. Cook and Finn Keane.

Some artists applauded Charli XCX for her songwriting skills, including Olivia Rodrigo, Izzy Camina, Girli, and Lolo Zouaï. Apart from her own music, Charli XCX also wrote for other artists, including Blondie, will.i.am, Selena Gomez, Camila Cabello, Iggy Azalea, Twice, and Katseye.

== Songs ==
Key
‡	Indicates song written solely by Charli XCX

Song	Artist(s)	Writer(s)	Album	Year	Ref.
"!Franchesckaar!"	Charli XCX	Charlotte Aitchison ‡	14	2008	
"1 Night"	Mura Masa featuring Charli XCX	Alex Crossan; Charlotte Aitchison; Patrik Berger; Fredrik Berger; Piero Piccioni (Note: "1 Night" contains samples of "Tahiti", written and performed by Piero Piccioni.)	Mura Masa	2017	
"100 Bad" (Remix)	Tommy Genesis featuring Charli XCX	Genesis Mohanraj; Charlotte Aitchison	Tommy Genesis	2018	
"14"	Charli XCX	Charlotte Aitchison ‡	14	2008	
"1999"	Charli XCX with Troye Sivan	Charlotte Aitchison; Jonnali Parmenius; Oscar Holter; Troye Sivan; Brett McLaughlin	Charli	2019	
"2 Die 4"	Addison Rae featuring Charli XCX	Addison Rae; Charlotte Aitchison; Andrew Goldstein; Brett McLaughlin; Jacob Kasher Hindlin; Madison Love	AR	2023	
"2007"	Charli XCX	Charlotte Aitchison; Alexander Guy Cook; Finn Keane	Music, Fashion, Film	2026	
"2099"	Charli XCX featuring Troye Sivan	Charlotte Aitchison; Alexander Guy Cook; Troye Sivan; Nicolas Petitfrère	Charli	2019	
"360"	Charli XCX	Charlotte Aitchison; Alexander Guy Cook; Blake Slatkin; Finn Keane; Henry Walter; Omer Fedi	Brat	2024	
"360 featuring Robyn and Yung Lean"	Charli XCX featuring Robyn and Yung Lean	Charlotte Aitchison; Alexander Guy Cook; Blake Slatkin; Finn Keane; Henry Walter; Omer Fedi; Robin Carlsson; Jonatan Leandoer	Brat and It's Completely Different but Also Still Brat	2024	
"365"	Charli XCX	Charlotte Aitchison; Alexander Guy Cook; Henry Walter	Brat	2024	
"365 featuring Shygirl"	Charli XCX featuring Shygirl	Charlotte Aitchison; Alexander Guy Cook; Henry Walter; Finn Keane; Omer Fedi; Blake Slatkin; Blane Muise; Mark Archer (Note: "365 (Remix)" contains samples of "Frequency", written by Mark Archer and Chris Peat, performed by Altern-8.); Chris Peat	Brat and It's Completely Different but Also Still Brat	2024	
"3AM (Pull Up)"	Charli XCX featuring MØ	Charlotte Aitchison; Alexander Guy Cook; Finn Keane; Karen Marie Ørsted	Number 1 Angel	2017	
"5 in the Morning"	Charli XCX	Charlotte Aitchison; Jeff Young; Jason Pebworth; George Astasio; Jon Shave; Nat Dunn; Cleo Tighe	Non-album single	2018	
"7 Years"	Charli XCX	Charlotte Aitchison; Alexander Guy Cook; BJ Burton	How I'm Feeling Now	2020	
"911" (Remix)	Lady Gaga featuring Charli XCX and A. G. Cook	Lady Gaga; Michael Tucker; Hugo Leclercq; Justin Tranter; Charlotte Aitchison	Dawn of Chromatica	2021	
"After the Afterparty"	Charli XCX featuring Lil Yachty	Charlotte Aitchison; Miles McCollum; Rachel Keen; Fred Gibson; Sophie Xeon; Tor Erik Hermansen; Mikkel Storleer Eriksen; Eyelar Mirzazadeh	Non-album single	2016	
"Alcoholic"	Charli XCX	Charlotte Aitchison ‡	14	2008	
"Ali"	—N/a	Charlotte Aitchison; Uzoechi Emenike	—N/a	Unreleased	
"Always Everywhere"	Charli XCX	Charlotte Aitchison; Finn Keane; Justin Raisen; Lewis Pesacov	Wuthering Heights	2026	
"Altars"	Charli XCX	Charlotte Aitchison; Justin Raisen	Wuthering Heights	2026	
"Angry All the Time"	Charli XCX	Charlotte Aitchison; Matt Squire	—N/a	Unreleased	
"Anthems"	Charli XCX	Charlotte Aitchison; Dylan Brady; Danny L Harle	How I'm Feeling Now	2020	
"Apple"	Charli XCX	Charlotte Aitchison; George Daniel; Linus Wiklund; Jonnali Parmenius	Brat	2024	
"Apple featuring the Japanese House"	Charli XCX featuring the Japanese House	Charlotte Aitchison; George Daniel; Linus Wiklund; Jonnali Parmenius; Amber Bain	Brat and It's Completely Different but Also Still Brat	2024	
"Atomic"	—N/a	Charlotte Aitchison; Alex Drury; Daniel Zak Watts	—N/a	Unreleased	
"B2B"	Charli XCX	Charlotte Aitchison; Alexander Guy Cook; Mike Lévy; Omer Fedi	Brat	2024	
"B2B featuring Tinashe"	Charli XCX featuring Tinashe	Charlotte Aitchison; Alexander Guy Cook; Mike Lévy; Omer Fedi; Finn Keane; Tinashe Kachingwe	Brat and It's Completely Different but Also Still Brat	2024	
"Baby"	Charli XCX	Charlotte Aitchison; Jeremiah Raisen; Justin Raisen	Crash	2022	
"Babygirl"	Charli XCX featuring Uffie	Charlotte Aitchison; Amanda Lucille Warner; John Hill; Sarah Hudson; Anna-Catherine Hartley	Number 1 Angel	2017	
"Backseat"	Charli XCX featuring Carly Rae Jepsen	Charlotte Aitchison; Alexander Guy Cook; Finn Keane; Carly Rae Jepsen	Pop 2	2017	
"Bad Tattoo"	—N/a	Charlotte Aitchison; Alexander Guy Cook; Finn Keane; Alma-Sofia Miettinen	—N/a	Unreleased	
"Bang Bang"	DJ Fresh and Diplo featuring R. City, Selah Sue and Craig David	Daniel Stein; Thomas Pentz; Theron Thomas; Timothy Thomas; Charlotte Aitchison; Craig David; Lukasz Gottwald; Henry Walter	Non-album single	2016	
"Be Right Here"	Kungs and Stargate featuring Josh Golden	Valentin Brunel; Tor Erik Hermansen; Mikkel Storleer Eriksen; Jonnali Parmenius; Alexandra Yatchenko; Charlotte Aitchison; Robbie Bergin; Tor Harmsen	Non-album single	2018	
"Beg for It"	Iggy Azalea featuring MØ	Amethyst Kelly; Charlotte Aitchison; Jon Turner; Jason Pebworth; George Astasio; Jon Shave; Kurtis McKenzie	Reclassified	2014	
"Beg for You"	Charli XCX featuring Rina Sawayama	Charlotte Aitchison; Rina Sawayama; Alexander Soifer; Sorana Pacurer; Roland Spreckley; Nicholas Gale; Anoo Bhagavan (Note: "Beg for You" contains samples of "Cry for You", written by Jonas von der Burg, Anoo Bhagavan and Niclas von der Burg, recorded by September.); Niclas von der Berg; Jonas von der Berg	Crash	2022	
"Bel Air"	Katseye	Charlotte Aitchison; Jonnali Parmenius; Stefan Gräslund; Patrik Berger; Martin Stilling; Kristin Carpenter	Wild	2026	
"Black Roses"	Charli XCX	Charlotte Aitchison; Ariel Rechtshaid; Justin Raisen	True Romance	2012	
"Blame It on U"	Charli XCX	Charlotte Aitchison; Alexander Guy Cook; Jonnali Parmenius	Number 1 Angel	2017	
"Blame It on Your Love" (Note: "Blame It on Your Love" is the original version of Charli XCX's "Track 10".)	Charli XCX featuring Lizzo	Charlotte Aitchison; Tor Erik Hermansen; Mikkel Storleer Eriksen; Jonnali Parmenius; Alexandra Yatchenko; Finn Keane; Melissa Jefferson	Charli	2019	
"Block"	Brooke Candy	Brooke Candy; Charlotte Emma Aitchison; Alexander Guy Cook; Dylan Brady; Jesse St. John Geller; Gigi Grombacher	Candyland	2024	
"Blow You Up"	Yogi featuring AlunaGeorge and Less Is Moore	Yogesh Tulsiani; Jean-Baptiste; Deleon Blake; Aluna Francis; George Reid; Tor Erik Hermansen; Mikkel Storleer Eriksen; Ross Golan; Benjamin Levin; Charlotte Aitchison; Alexander Lewis; Michael Tucker	Non-album single	2016	
"Blue Flame"	Anne Hathaway	Jack Antonoff; Charlotte Aitchison; George Daniel; Mark Spears	Mother Mary: Greatest Hits	2026	
"Bluest Flame"	Selena Gomez and Benny Blanco	Selena Gomez; Benjamin Levin; Charlotte Aitchison; Dylan Brady; Magnus Høiberg	I Said I Love You First	2025	
"Body of My Own"	Charli XCX	Charlotte Aitchison; Patrik Berger; Christian Olsson	Sucker	2014	
"Boom Clap"	Charli XCX	Charlotte Aitchison; Fredrik Berger; Patrik Berger; Stefan Gräslund	Sucker	2014	
"Bounce"	Charli XCX featuring Kyary Pamyu Pamyu	Charlotte Aitchison; Alexander Guy Cook; Sophie Xeon; Jonnali Parmenius	—N/a	Unreleased	
"Boyfriend Material"	Bella Thorne	Charlotte Aitchison; Allan Grigg	Jersey	2014	
"Boys & Girls"	will.i.am featuring Pia Mia	William Adams; Charlotte Aitchison; Jef Martens; Kylie Minogue (Note: "Boys & Girls" contains a sample of "Break This Heartbreak", written by Kylie Minogue and Fernando Garibay, recorded by Minogue.); Fernando Garibay	Non-album single	2016	
"Break the Rules"	Charli XCX	Charlotte Aitchison; Steve Mac; Tor Erik Hermansen; Mikkel Storleer Eriksen; Dan Omelio; Magnus August Høiberg	Sucker	2014	
"Breaking Up"	Charli XCX	Charlotte Aitchison; Patrik Berger; Jonnali Parmenius; Markus Krunegård	Sucker	2014	
"Bricks"	Tommy Genesis with Charli XCX	Genesis Mohanraj; Charlotte Aitchison	Non-album single	2019	
"Britpop"	A. G. Cook	Alexander Guy Cook; Charlotte Aitchison	Britpop	2024	
"Bullets"	Thy Slaughter	Alexander Guy Cook; Finn Keane; Charlotte Aitchison; Alma-Sofia Miettinen; Noonie Bao; Patrik Berger	Soft Rock	2023	
"Burial"	Anne Hathaway	Anne Hathaway; Charlotte Aitchison; George Daniel; Jack Antonoff	Mother Mary: Greatest Hits	2026	
"C2.0"	Charli XCX	Charlotte Aitchison; Alexander Guy Cook (Note: "c2.0" contains an interpolation of "Click", written by Charli XCX, A. G. Cook, Umru, Theron Thomas, Tommy Cash, Dylan Brady and recorded by Charli XCX featuring Kim Petras and Tommy Cash.); Dylan Brady; Jaan Umru Rothenburg; Theron Thomas; Tomas Tammemets	How I'm Feeling Now	2020	
"Call Him"	—N/a	Charlotte Aitchison; Trevarious Gross	—N/a	Unreleased	
"Camera"	Charli XCX	Charlotte Aitchison; Finn Keane	Music, Fashion, Film	2026	
"Can You Hear Me"	—N/a	Charlotte Aitchison; Sophie Xeon; Jonnali Parmenius	—N/a	Unreleased	
"Card Declined"	Charli XCX	Charlotte Aitchison; Alexander Guy Cook; Finn Keane	Music, Fashion, Film	2026	
"Caught in the Middle"	Charli XCX	Charlotte Aitchison; Benjamin Levin; Nick van Hofwegen	Sucker	2014	
"Chains of Love"	Charli XCX	Charlotte Aitchison; Finn Keane; Justin Raisen	Wuthering Heights	2026	
"Charger" (Charli XCX Rework)	ELIO with Charli XCX	Charlotte Aitchison; Charlotte Lee; Brett McLaughlin; Andrew Seltzer	The Remixes	2021	
"Chas's Song"	Charli XCX	Charlotte Aitchison ‡	14	2008	
"Cherry Pie"	—N/a	Charlotte Aitchison; Uzoechi Emenike	—N/a	Unreleased	
"Claws"	Charli XCX	Charlotte Aitchison; Dylan Brady; BJ Burton	How I'm Feeling Now	2020	
"Click"	Charli XCX featuring Kim Petras and Tommy Cash	Charlotte Aitchison; Alexander Guy Cook; Jaan Umru Rothenburg; Theron Thomas; Tomas Tammemets; Dylan Brady	Charli	2019	
"Cloud Aura"	Charli XCX featuring Brooke Candy	Charlotte Aitchison; Joseph Zucco; Jesse Saint John; Brooke Candy	Super Ultra; True Romance	2012	
"Club Classics"	Charli XCX	Charlotte Aitchison; George Daniel	Brat	2024	
"Club Classics featuring BB Trickz"	Charli XCX featuring BB Trickz	Charlotte Aitchison; George Daniel; Tim Nelson; Belize Kazi	Brat and It's Completely Different but Also Still Brat	2024	
"Come to My Party"	Charli XCX	Charlotte Aitchison; Jason Pebworth; George Astasio; Jon Shave; Amanda Lucille Warner	—N/a	Unreleased	
"Cold Nites (Remix)"	Charli XCX	Forest Swords (Note: "Cold Nites (Remix)" is a remix of the song of the same name, written by Forest Swords and How to Dress Well, recorded by the latter.); Tom Krell; Charlotte Aitchison	Super Ultra	2012	
"Constant Repeat"	Charli XCX	Charlotte Aitchison; Jonnali Parmenius; Linus Wiklund	Crash	2022	
"Crash"	Charli XCX	Charlotte Aitchison; George Daniel; Alexander Guy Cook; Waylon Rector	Crash	2022	
"Crazy Crazy"	Yasutaka Nakata featuring Charli XCX and Kyary Pamyu Pamyu	Yasutaka Nakata; Charlotte Aitchison	Digital Native	2017	
"Cross You Out"	Charli XCX featuring Sky Ferreira	Charlotte Aitchison; Alexander Guy Cook; Jonnali Parmenius; Linus Wiklund	Charli	2019	
"Cut Ties"	Anne Hathaway	Anne Hathaway; Charlotte Aitchison; George Daniel; Jack Antonoff; Patrik Berger	Mother Mary: Greatest Hits	2026	
"Dance 4 U"	Charli XCX	Charlotte Aitchison; Sinjin Hawke (Note: "Dance 4 U" uses the instrumental of "Love Is on Your Side", written and recorded by Sinjin Hawke.)	Super Ultra	2012	
"Dance for Me"	Alma featuring MØ	Alma-Sofia Miettinen; Charlotte Aitchison; Jonnali Parmenius; Andreas Schuller; Karen Marie Orsted	Heavy Rules Mixtape	2018	
"Danceteria Afterhours" (Note: "Danceteria Afterhours" is a remix of "Danceteria", performed originally by Madonna, with additional lyrics. It contains an interpolation of "Walk on the Wild Side" (1973), written by Lou Reed.)	Madonna and Charli XCX	Madonna; Andrew Watt; Charlotte Aitchison; Henry Walter; Jeremiah Patrick Lordan; Lou Reed; Stuart Price	—N/a	2026	
"Dark Cradle"	Anne Hathaway	Jack Antonoff; Charlotte Aitchison; Patrik Berger	Mother Mary: Greatest Hits	2026	
"Deadstream (Rostam Version)"	Jim-E Stack featuring Charli XCX and Rostam	James Stack; Charlotte Aitchison; Rostam Batmanglij	It's Jim-ee	2017	
"Delicious"	Charli XCX featuring Tommy Cash	Charlotte Aitchison; Alexander Guy Cook; Tomas Tammemets	Pop 2	2017	
"Destiny's Child"	Charli XCX	Charlotte Aitchison; Ian Kirkpatrick; Ariel Rechtshaid	—N/a	Unreleased	
"Detonate"	Charli XCX	Charlotte Aitchison; Alexander Guy Cook	How I'm Feeling Now	2020	
"Diamonds"	Giorgio Moroder featuring Charli XCX	Charlotte Aitchison; Joakim Åhlund	Déjà Vu	2015	
"Die Tonight"	Charli XCX	Charlotte Aitchison; Patrik Berger; Jonnali Parmenius; Markus Krunegård; Pontus Winnberg; Rostam Batmanglij; Andrew Wyatt	Sucker	2014	
"Dirty Sexy Money"	David Guetta and Afrojack featuring Charli XCX and French Montana	David Guetta; Nick van de Wall; Jonnali Parmenius; Alexander Guy Cook; Charlotte Aitchison; Karim Kharbouch	7	2017	
"DIV"	—N/a	Charlotte Aitchison; Michael Volpe	—N/a	Unreleased	
"Doing It"	Charli XCX featuring Rita Ora (Note: The single version of "Doing It" features vocals by Rita Ora.)	Charlotte Aitchison; Ariel Rechtshaid; Jarrad Rogers; Jonnali Parmenius; Matthew Burns	Sucker	2014	
"Don't Want Your Love"	Illenium with Ellie Goulding	Nicholas Miller; Ellie Goulding; Charlotte Aitchison; Alberto Melendez; Peter Rycroft	Odyssey	2026	
"Drama" (Remix)	Bladee with Mechatok featuring Charli XCX	Benjamin Reichwald; Timur Tokdemir; Charlotte Aitchison	Good Luck (Deluxe Edition)	2021	
"Dream Glow"	BTS with Charli XCX	Charlotte Aitchison; Aryn Wüthrich; Mikkel Storleer Eriksen; Tor Erik Hermansen; Bobby Jung	BTS World: Original Soundtrack	2019	
"Dreamer"	Charli XCX featuring Starrah and Raye	Charlotte Aitchison; Alexander Guy Cook; Brittany Hazzard; Rachel Keen	Number 1 Angel	2017	
"Dreams Money Can Buy"	Charli XCX	Charlotte Aitchison; Jai Paul (Note: "Dreams Money Can Buy" uses the instrumental of "BTSTU", written and recorded by Jai Paul.)	Heartbreaks and Earthquakes	2012	
"Drop That Kitty"	Ty Dolla $ign featuring Charli XCX and Tinashe	Tyrone Griffin, Jr. Charlotte Aitchison; Tor Erik Hermansen; Mikkel Storleer Eriksen; Magnus August Høiberg	Non-album single	2015	
"Drugs"	Charli XCX featuring Abra	Charlotte Aitchison; Alexander Guy Cook; Gabrielle Mirville	Number 1 Angel	2017	
"Drum"	MØ	Karen Marie Ørsted; Charlotte Aitchison; Jonnali Parmenius; Michael Tucker	Non-album single	2016	
"Dying for You"	Charli XCX	Charlotte Aitchison; Finn Keane; Justin Raisen	Wuthering Heights	2026	
"Emotional"	Charli XCX	Charlotte Aitchison; Patrik Berger	Number 1 Angel	2017	
"End of the World"	Alex Metric with Charli XCX	Alex Drury; Charlotte Aitchison; Daniel Zak Watts	Non-album single	2011	
"Enemies"	—N/a	Charlotte Aitchison; Fred Ball; Frederik Castenschiold Eichen; Alma Sofia-Miettinen; Tove Nilsson	—N/a	Unreleased	
"Enemy"	Charli XCX	Charlotte Aitchison; BJ Burton; Eli Teplin; James Stack	How I'm Feeling Now	2020	
"Every Rule"	Charli XCX	Charlotte Aitchison; Alexander Guy Cook	Crash	2022	
"Everything Is Romantic"	Charli XCX	Charlotte Aitchison; Pablo Díaz-Reixa; Jae Deal	Brat	2024	
"Everything Is Romantic featuring Caroline Polachek"	Charli XCX featuring Caroline Polachek	Charlotte Aitchison; Pablo Díaz-Reixa; Jae Deal; Alexander Guy Cook; Jasper Harris; Marlon Barrow; Caroline Polachek	Brat and It's Completely Different but Also Still Brat	2024	
"Explode"	Charli XCX	Charlotte Aitchison; Greg Kurstin	The Angry Birds Movie (Original Motion Picture Soundtrack)	2016	
"Eyes of the World"	Charli XCX featuring Sky Ferreira	Charlotte Aitchison; Finn Keane; Justin Raisen; Sky Ferreira	Wuthering Heights	2026	
"Eyes Wide"	—N/a	Charlotte Aitchison; Jim Duguid	—N/a	Unreleased	
"Famous"	Charli XCX	Charlotte Aitchison; Greg Kurstin	Sucker	2014	
"Fancy"	Iggy Azalea featuring Charli XCX	Amethyst Kelly; Charlotte Aitchison; George Astasio; Jason Pebworth; Jon Shave; Kurtis McKenzie	The New Classic	2014	
"February 2017"	Charli XCX featuring Clairo and Yaeji	Charlotte Aitchison; Alexander Guy Cook; Katherine Yaeji Lee; Claire Cottrill; Charles Teiller; Caroline Beatrix Maurin; Alexandre Teiller	Charli	2019	
"Flash Pose"	Pabllo Vittar featuring Charli XCX	Aluna Francis; Arthur Marques; Charlotte Aitchison; Maffalda; Pablo Bispo; Rodrigo Gorky; Zebu	111	2019	
"Float On"	Danny Brown featuring Charli XCX	Daniel Sewell; Charlotte Aitchison; Adam Feeney; Matthew Tavares; Chester Hansen; Alexander Sowinski	Old	2013	
"Focus"	Charli XCX	Charlotte Aitchison; Alexander Guy Cook; Svante Halldin; Jakob Hazell	Non-album single	2018	
"Forever"	Charli XCX	Charlotte Aitchison; Alexander Guy Cook; BJ Burton	How I'm Feeling Now	2020	
"Forgiveness"	Charli XCX	Charlotte Aitchison ‡	Super Ultra	2012	
"Four by Four"	—N/a	Charlotte Aitchison; James Tadgell; Jon Clare	—N/a	Unreleased	
"Friends"	The Japanese House	Amber Bain; Charlotte Aitchison	In the End It Always Does	2023	
"Friss Meine Shorts"	—N/a	Charlotte Aitchison; Linus Eklöw; Patrik Berger	—N/a	Unreleased	
"Fruit Salad"	—N/a	Charlotte Aitchison; Uzoechi Emenike	—N/a	Unreleased	
"Funny Mouth"	Charli XCX	Charlotte Aitchison; Finn Keane; Joe Keery	Wuthering Heights	2026	
"Gabriela"	Katseye	Andrew Watt; John Ryan; Ali Tamposi; Charlotte Aitchison; Sara Schell	Beautiful Chaos	2025	
"Genjitsu Camera"	Kalen Anzai	Kalen Anzai; Charlotte Aitchison; Danny L Harle; Kanata Okajima; Radical Hardcore Clique	—N/a	2021	
"Girl, So Confusing"	Charli XCX	Charlotte Aitchison; Alexander Guy Cook	Brat	2024	
"Girl, So Confusing featuring Lorde"	Charli XCX featuring Lorde	Charlotte Aitchison; Alexander Guy Cook; Ella Yelich-O'Connor; James Stack	Brat and It's Completely Different but Also Still Brat	2024	
"Girls Like Us"	Twice	Uzoechi Emenike; Dimitri Tikovoï; Maya von Doll; Charlotte Aitchison; Park Ji-hyo	Fancy You	2019	
"Girls Night Out"	Charli XCX	Charlotte Aitchison; Sophie Xeon	Non-album single	2018	
"Glow"	Charli XCX	Charlotte Aitchison; Will Wiesenfeld (Note: "Glow" uses the instrumental of "Mecha Joy", written and recorded by Baths.)	Super Ultra	2012	
"Gold Coins"	Charli XCX	Charlotte Aitchison; Patrik Berger; Stefan Gräslund	Sucker	2014	
"Gone"	Charli XCX with Christine and the Queens	Charlotte Aitchison; Alexander Guy Cook; Jonnali Parmenius; Héloïse Letissier; Linus Wiklund; Nicolas Petitfrère	Charli	2019	
"Good Girls"	—N/a	Charlotte Aitchison; Sophie Xeon; Jonnali Parmenius; Tor Erik Hermansen; Mikkel Storleer Eriksen; John Robert Grabiec	—N/a	Unreleased	
"Good Ones"	Charli XCX	Charlotte Aitchison; Jonnali Parmenius; Caroline Ailin; Mattias Larsson; Robin Fredriksson; Oscar Holter	Crash	2021	
"Got No Love"	—N/a	Charlotte Aitchison; Kuk Harrell; Sean Hall	—N/a	Unreleased	
"Gravity"	Blondie	Charlotte Aitchison; Dimitri Tikovoï	Pollinator	2017	
"Grins"	Charli XCX	Charlotte Aitchison; Michael Tucker (Note: "Grins" uses the instrumental of the song of the same name, written and recorded by Blood Diamonds.)	Heartbreaks and Earthquakes; True Romance	2012	
"Guess"	Charli XCX	Charlotte Aitchison; Harrison Patrick Smith; Dylan Brady	Brat and It's the Same but There's Three More Songs So It's Not	2024	
"Guess featuring Billie Eilish"	Charli XCX featuring Billie Eilish	Charlotte Aitchison; Harrison Patrick Smith; Dylan Brady; Billie Eilish; Finneas O'Connell	Brat and It's Completely Different but Also Still Brat	2024	
"Hand in the Fire"	Mr. Oizo featuring Charli XCX	Quentin Dupieux; Charlotte Aitchison; Andrew Wyatt; Amanda Lucille Warner; Jonnali Parmenius; Rostam Batmanglij	All Wet	2015	
"Hanging Around"	Charli XCX	Charlotte Aitchison; Jeremiah Raisen; Justin Raisen; Rivers Cuomo	Sucker	2014	
"Hard 2 Love"	Gwen Stefani	Charlotte Aitchison; Benjamin Levin; Magnus August Høiberg; Michael Angelakos; Aryn Wüthrich	—N/a	Unreleased	
"Haunt"	—N/a	Charlotte Aitchison; Michael Volpe	—N/a	Unreleased	
"Heal My Heart"	—N/a	Charlotte Aitchison; Justin Parker	—N/a	Unreleased	
"Heatwave"	Charli XCX	Charlotte Aitchison ‡	Super Ultra	2012	
"Heavy"	Thy Slaughter	Alexander Guy Cook; Charlotte Aitchison	Soft Rock	2023	
"Hell Yeah Baby"	Gwen Stefani	Charlotte Aitchison; Michael Angelakos; Magnus August Høiberg; Benjamin Levin; Gwen Stefani; Aryn Wüthrich	—N/a	Unreleased	
"Hello Goodbye"	Charli XCX	Charlotte Aitchison; Alexander Guy Cook	Brat and It's the Same but There's Three More Songs So It's Not	2024	
"Her Body"	Nasty Cherry	Charlotte Aitchison; Gabbriette; Chloe Chaidez; Deborah Knox-Hewson; Georgia Somary; Yves Rothman	The Movie	2021	
"Here to Stay"	—N/a	Charlotte Aitchison; Martin Stilling; Elsa Carmona Oljelund	—N/a	Unreleased	
"High Maintenance"	—N/a	Charlotte Aitchison; Uzoechi Emenike	—N/a	Unreleased	
"Holy Spirit"	Anne Hathaway	Anne Hathaway; Charlotte Aitchison; George Daniel; Jack Antonoff	Mother Mary: Greatest Hits	2026	
"Hot Girl"	Charli XCX	Charlotte Aitchison; George Daniel	Bodies Bodies Bodies	2022	
"Hot in It"	Tiësto and Charli XCX	Tijs Verwest; Charlotte Aitchison; Kiddo; Frank Nobel; Hight; Linus Nordstrom	Drive	2022	
"House"	Charli XCX featuring John Cale	Charlotte Aitchison; John Cale; Finn Keane; Nathan Klein	Wuthering Heights	2026	
"How Can I"	Charli XCX	Charlotte Aitchison; Justin Raisen; Ariel Rechtshaid	Heartbreaks and Earthquakes; True Romance	2012	
"How Can I Not Know What I Need Right Now"	Charli XCX	Charlotte Aitchison; George Daniel	Crash	2022	
"Hurts Like Hell"	Madison Beer featuring Offset	Madison Beer; Kiari Cephus; Charlotte Aitchison; Jason Pebworth; George Astasio; Jon Shave; Mike Sabath	Non-album single	2018	
"I Don't Care"	—N/a	Charlotte Aitchison; Patrik Berger; Linus Eklöw; Dominik Walenciak	—N/a	Unreleased	
"I Don't Wanna Know"	Charli XCX	Charlotte Aitchison; Alexander Guy Cook	Charli	2019	
"I Finally Understand"	Charli XCX	Charlotte Aitchison; Palmistry	How I'm Feeling Now	2020	
"I Got It"	Charli XCX featuring Brooke Candy, Cupcakke and Pabllo Vittar	Charlotte Aitchison; Alexander Guy Cook; Elizabeth Harris; Jesse Saint John; Pabllo Vittar	Pop 2	2017	
"I Keep on Thinking Bout You Every Single Day and Night"	Charli XCX	Charlotte Aitchison; Finn Keane	Music, Fashion, Film (B-Sides Edition)	2026	
"I Love It"	Icona Pop featuring Charli XCX	Charlotte Aitchison; Patrik Berger; Linus Eklöw	Icona Pop	2012	
"I Might Say Something Stupid"	Charli XCX	Charlotte Aitchison; Mike Lévy	Brat	2024	
"I Might Say Something Stupid featuring the 1975 and Jon Hopkins"	Charli XCX featuring the 1975 and Jon Hopkins	Charlotte Aitchison; Mike Lévy; Matthew Healy; George Daniel; Jon Hopkins	Brat and It's Completely Different but Also Still Brat	2024	
"I Think About It All the Time"	Charli XCX	Charlotte Aitchison; Alexander Guy Cook; Finn Keane; Jon Shave	Brat	2024	
"I Think About It All the Time featuring Bon Iver"	Charli XCX featuring Bon Iver	Charlotte Aitchison; Alexander Guy Cook; Finn Keane; Jon Shave; Justin Vernon; Bonnie Raitt (Note: "I Think About It All the Time (Remix)" contains interpolations of "Nick of Time", written and performed by Bonnie Raitt.)	Brat and It's Completely Different but Also Still Brat	2024	
"I Wanna Be with You"	—N/a	Charlotte Aitchison; Sophie Xeon; Jonnali Parmenius	—N/a	Unreleased	
"I Wish"	—N/a	Charlotte Aitchison; Scott Harris; Jonnali Parmenius; Jason Evigan; Harley Streten (Note: "I Wish" uses the instrumental of "v", written and recorded by Flume.)	—N/a	Unreleased	
"I'll Teach You a Lesson"	Charli XCX	Charlotte Aitchison ‡	14	2008	
"I'm a Dream"	BC Unidos featuring Charli XCX	Charlotte Aitchison; Markus Krunegård; Patrik Berger	Bicycle	2017	
"I'm Afraid"	Charli XCX	Charlotte Aitchison; Finn Keane	Music, Fashion, Film	2026	
"I'm Not Sorry"	—N/a	Charlotte Aitchison; Gary Baker; Ludwig Göransson	—N/a	Unreleased	
"I, U, Us"	Raye	Rachel Keen; Charlotte Aitchison; Jonnali Parmenius; Fred Gibson	Second	2016	
"If It's Over"	MØ featuring Charli XCX	Karen Marie Ørsted; Tor Erik Hermansen; Mikkel Storleer Eriksen; Charlotte Aitchison; Ross Birchard; Ori Kaplan; Jocelyn Donald	Forever Neverland	2018	
"If You Take Away the Music Then What Has She Got?"	Charli XCX	Charlotte Aitchison; Alexander Guy Cook; Finn Keane	Music, Fashion, Film (B-Sides Edition)	2026	
"Illusions"	—N/a	Charlotte Aitchison; Joseph Zucco	—N/a	Unreleased	
"ILY2"	Charli XCX	Charlotte Aitchison; Danny L Harle	Number 1 Angel	2017	
"In the City"	Charli XCX and Sam Smith	Alexander Cook; Charlotte Aitchison; George Daniel; Ilya Salmanzadeh; Sam Smith; Omer Fedi	Non-album single	2023	
"Jealous"	AlunaGeorge	Aluna Francis; George Reid; John Hill; Ajay Bhattacharyya; Charlotte Aitchison; Jonnali Parmenius	I Remember	2016	
"Joan of Arc"	Ricky Reed	Eric Frederic; Joe Spargur; Charlotte Aitchison; James Fauntleroy; Mark Foster; Wayne Hector	Non-album single	2017	
"Jungle"	—N/a	Charlotte Aitchison; Uzoechi Emenike	—N/a	Unreleased	
"Just Desserts"	Marina and the Diamonds with Charli XCX	Marina Diamandis; Charlotte Aitchison; Daniel Dare; Thomas Broderick	Non-album single	2013	
"Kingdom"	Charli XCX with Simon Le Bon	Charlotte Aitchison; Holly Hardy; Rostam Batmanglij; Simon Le Bon	The Hunger Games: Mockingjay, Part 1	2014	
"Ladder"	—N/a	Charlotte Aitchison; Uzoechi Emenike	—N/a	Unreleased	
"Leave Me"	Charli XCX	Charlotte Aitchison ‡	14	2008	
"Light It Up"	—N/a	Charlotte Aitchison; Patrik Berger; Stefan Gräslund	—N/a	Unreleased	
"Lightning"	Charli XCX	Charlotte Aitchison; Rami Yacoub; Ilya Salmanzadeh; Madison Love	Crash	2022	
"Like This"	—N/a	Charlotte Aitchison; Jonnali Parmenius; Jarrad Rogers	—N/a	Unreleased	
"Lipgloss"	Charli XCX featuring Cupcakke	Charlotte Aitchison; Alexander Guy Cook; Elizabeth Harris	Number 1 Angel	2017	
"Live Forever"	Nasty Cherry	Charlotte Aitchison; Gabbriette; Chloe Chaidez; Deborah Knox-Hewson; Georgia Somary; Justin Raisen	Season 1	2019	
"Live Life"	Charli XCX	Charlotte Aitchison ‡	14	2008	
"Lock You Up"	Charli XCX	Charlotte Aitchison; Ariel Rechtshaid	Heartbreaks and Earthquakes; True Romance	2012	
"London Queen"	Charli XCX	Charlotte Aitchison; Justin Raisen; Jeremiah Raisen; Ariel Rosenberg; Remi Nicole	Sucker	2014	
"Love Gang"	Whethan featuring Charli XCX	Ethan Snorek; Thomas Eriksen; Charlotte Aitchison; Ester Dean	Non-album single	2017	
"Lucifer"	A. G. Cook	Alexander Guy Cook; Charlotte Aitchison; Noonie Bao; Addison Rae; Brett Leland McLaughlin	Britpop	2024	
"Lucky"	Charli XCX	Charlotte Aitchison; Alexander Guy Cook; Nicolas "Ö" Petitfrère	Pop 2	2017	
"Lucy"	Charli XCX	Charlotte Aitchison ‡	14	2008	
"Machines"	Charli XCX	Charlotte Aitchison ‡	14	2008	
"Magic Metal Montana"	Charli XCX	Charlotte Aitchison; Alexander Guy Cook	Music, Fashion, Film	2026	
"Mauritius"	Charli XCX	Charlotte Aitchison ‡	14	2008	
"Mean Girls"	Charli XCX	Charlotte Aitchison; Alexander Guy Cook; Ross Birchard	Brat	2024	
"Mean Girls featuring Julian Casablancas"	Charli XCX featuring Julian Casablancas	Charlotte Aitchison; Alexander Guy Cook; Ross Birchard; Julian Casablancas; Herbie Hancock (Note: "Mean Girls" (Remix) contains samples of "Secret Sauce", written and performed by Herbie Hancock.)	Brat and It's Completely Different but Also Still Brat	2024	
"Mess"	—N/a	Charlotte Aitchison; Patrik Berger; Ana Diaz	—N/a	Unreleased	
"Midnight"	—N/a	Charlotte Aitchison; Justin Parker	—N/a	Unreleased	
"Miss U"	Charli XCX	Charlotte Aitchison; Jonnali Parmenius; Linus Wiklund; Madison Love	13 Reasons Why: Season 3	2019	
"Moments in Love"	Charli XCX	Charlotte Aitchison; Art of Noise (Note: "Moments in Love" uses the instrumental of the song of the same name, written and recorded by Art of Noise.)	Super Ultra	2012	
"Moments Noticed"	Jim-E Stack	James Stack; Charlotte Aitchison; Rostam Batmanglij	It's Jim-ee	2018	
"Moonlight"	Lil Xan with Charli XCX	Diego Leanos; Matthew Day; Robert Mandell; Charlotte Aitchison	Total Xanarchy	2018	
"Move Me"	Charli XCX	Charlotte Aitchison; Amy Allen; Jason Evigan; Ian Kirkpatrick	Crash	2022	
"My Heart"	—N/a	Charlotte Aitchison; Fred Ball; Jonnali Parmenius	—N/a	Unreleased	
"My Reminder"	Charli XCX	Charlotte Aitchison; Justin Raisen	Wuthering Heights	2026	
"My Sex"	Brooke Candy featuring Mykki Blanco, Pussy Riot and MNDR	Brooke Candy; Michael Quattlebaum Jr. Charlotte Aitchison; Amanda Lucille Warner; Peter Wade Keusch; Nadya Tolokonnikova	Non-album single	2018	
"Naked"	—N/a	Charlotte Aitchison; Alexander Guy Cook; Finn Keane; Jonnali Parmenius	—N/a	Unreleased	
"Nasty French"	—N/a	Charlotte Aitchison; Uzoechi Emenike	—N/a	Unreleased	
"Need Ur Luv"	Charli XCX	Charlotte Aitchison; Rostam Batmanglij; Jonnali Parmenius; Andrew Wyat	Sucker	2014	
"Neon Fashion and Glowstix"	Charli XCX	Charlotte Aitchison ‡	14	2008	
"New Shapes"	Charli XCX featuring Christine and the Queens and Caroline Polachek	Charlotte Aitchison; Héloïse Letissier; Caroline Polachek; Deaton Chris Anthony; Jonnali Parmenius; Linus Wiklund	Crash	2021	
"Next Level Charli"	Charli XCX	Charlotte Aitchison; Alexander Guy Cook	Charli	2019	
"No Angel"	Charli XCX	Charlotte Aitchison; Jason Pebworth; George Astasio; Jon Shave; Alexander Oriet; David Phelan	Non-album single	2018	
"No Body"	Easyfun	Alexander Guy Cook; Charlotte Aitchison; Finn Keane; Noonie Bao; Patrik Berger	Electric	2023	
"No One Lasts Forever"	Charli XCX featuring David Cronenberg	Charlotte Aitchison; Alexander Guy Cook; Finn Keane	Music, Fashion, Film	2026	
"No Romeo"	—N/a	Charlotte Aitchison; Steve Mac; Ammar Malik	—N/a	Unreleased	
"Nobody to Know"	—N/a	Charlotte Aitchison; Patrik Berger; Finn Keane; Jonnali Parmenius	—N/a	Unreleased	
"Not in Love"	—N/a	Charlotte Aitchison; Jonnali Parmenius; Jarrad Rogers	—N/a	Unreleased	
"Nothing Too Serious"	—N/a	Charlotte Aitchison; Uzoechi Emenike	—N/a	Unreleased	
"Nuclear Seasons"	Charli XCX	Charlotte Aitchison; Ariel Rechtshaid; Justin Raisen	You're the One; True Romance	2012	
"OctaHate"	Ryn Weaver	Aryn Wüthrich; Benjamin Levin; Charlotte Aitchison; Magnus August Høiberg; Michael Angelakos	The Fool	2014	
"Official"	Charli XCX	Charlotte Aitchison; Alexander Guy Cook; Jonnali Parmenius; Patrik Berger; Finn Keane	Charli	2019	
"OK"	Madeon	Hugo Pierre Leclercq; Charlotte Aitchison; Ed Drewett	Adventure	2015	
"OMG"	Camila Cabello featuring Quavo	Camila Cabello; Charlotte Aitchison; Quavious Marshall; Jonnali Parmenius; Alexandra Yatchenko; Tor Erik Hermansen; Mikkel Storleer Eriksen	Non-album single	2017	
"Open Up"	Charli XCX	Charlotte Aitchison; Finn Keane	Wuthering Heights	2026	
"Out of My Head"	Charli XCX featuring Tove Lo and Alma	Charlotte Aitchison; Alexander Guy Cook; Sophie Xeon; Tove Nilsson; Alma-Sofia Miettinen	Pop 2	2017	
"Out of Myself"	Charli XCX	Charlotte Aitchison; Finn Keane	Wuthering Heights	2026	
"Out Out"	Joel Corry and Jax Jones featuring Charli XCX and Saweetie	Joel Corry; Timucin Lam; Charlotte Aitchison; Diamonté Harper; Janée Bennett; Amber Van Day; Camille Purcell; Lewis Thompson; Holly Lapsley; Neave Applebaum; Nonô; Roxanne Emery; Paul Van Haver (Note: "Out Out" contains a sample of "Alors on danse", written and performed by Stromae.)	Non-album single	2021	
"Paradise"	Charli XCX featuring Hannah Diamond	Charlotte Aitchison; Sophie Xeon; Jonnali Parmenius; Martin Stilling; Alexander Guy Cook	Vroom Vroom	2016	
"Party 4 U"	Charli XCX	Charlotte Aitchison; Alexander Guy Cook	How I'm Feeling Now	2020	
"Persona"	Charli XCX	Charlotte Aitchison; Alexander Guy Cook; Finn Keane	Music, Fashion, Film	2026	
"Phases"	Alma with French Montana	Alma-Sofia Miettinen; Jonnali Parmenius; Alexandra Yatchenko; Charlotte Aitchison; Charlie Handsome; Rex Kudo; Styalz Fuego; Karim Kharbouch	Non-album single	2017	
"Pink Diamond"	Charli XCX	Charlotte Aitchison; Dijon Duenas; Alexander Guy Cook	How I'm Feeling Now	2020	
"Playboy Bunny"	Charli XCX	Charlotte Aitchison; Alexander Guy Cook; Finn Keane	Music, Fashion, Film (B-Sides Edition)	2026	
"Porsche"	Charli XCX featuring MØ	Charlotte Aitchison; Alexander Guy Cook; Henry Allen; Cassia O'Reilly; Karen Marie Ørsted	Pop 2	2017	
"Raining in Miami"	—N/a	Charlotte Aitchison; Jonnali Parmenius; Khalid Robinson; Linus Wiklund	—N/a	Unreleased	
"Real Friends"	XO	Charlotte Aitchison; Emmy Statham; John Ryan; Maegan Cottone; Mattias Larsson; Reanna Sujeewon; Robin Fredriksson; Shali Bordoni; Summer Askew; Zoe Miller	Fashionably Late	2025	
"Red Balloon"	Charli XCX	Charlotte Aitchison; Tor Erik Hermansen; Mikkel Storleer Eriksen; Magnus August Høiberg	Home: Original Motion Picture Soundtrack; Sucker	2014	
"Reflecting"	—N/a	Charlotte Aitchison; Steve Mac	—N/a	Unreleased	
"Repeat"	Karen	Karen Firlej; Alma-Sofia Miettinen; Charlotte Aitchison; Gerald Hoffmann; Joachim Piehl; Jonas Lang; Jonnali Parmenius; Philip Meckseper; Martin Peter Willumeit	Repeat	2020	
"Rewind"	Charli XCX	Charlotte Aitchison; Alexander Guy Cook; Henry Walter	Brat	2024	
"Rewind featuring Bladee"	Charli XCX featuring Bladee	Charlotte Aitchison; Alexander Guy Cook; Henry Walter; Benjamin Reichwald	Brat and It's Completely Different but Also Still Brat	2024	
"Rhinestone Hearts"	—N/a	Charlotte Aitchison; Linda Perry	—N/a	Unreleased	
"Ringtone (Remix)"	100 gecs featuring Charli XCX, Rico Nasty and Kero Kero Bonito	Dylan Brady; Laura Les; Charlotte Aitchison; Maria Kelly; Gus Lobban; Sarah Perry	1000 Gecs and the Tree of Clues	2020	
"Rock Music"	Charli XCX	Charlotte Aitchison; Alexander Guy Cook; Finn Keane	Music, Fashion, Film	2026	
"Roll with Me"	Charli XCX	Charlotte Aitchison; Klas Åhlund; Sophie Xeon	Number 1 Angel	2017	
"Same Old Love"	Selena Gomez	Tor Erik Hermansen; Mikkel Storleer Eriksen; Benjamin Levin; Charlotte Aitchison; Ross Golan	Revival	2015	
"Save Me"	—N/a	Charlotte Aitchison; Dimitri Tikovoï	—N/a	Unreleased	
"Scar Tissue"	Camila Cabello	Charlotte Aitchison; Camila Cabello; Kurtis McKenzie; Jon Mills; Eyelar Mirzazadeh; Dacoury Natche	—N/a	Unreleased	
"Secret (Shh)"	Charli XCX	Charlotte Aitchison; Jodie Harsh; Jesse Saint John; Jessica Ashley	Vroom Vroom	2016	
"Seeing Things"	Charli XCX	Charlotte Aitchison; Finn Keane; Justin Raisen	Wuthering Heights	2026	
"Selfish Girl"	Charli XCX	Charlotte Aitchison; Jonnali Parmenius; Linus Wiklund; Deaton Chris Anthony	Crash	2022	
"Señorita"	Shawn Mendes with Camila Cabello	Shawn Mendes; Camila Cabello; Andrew Wotman; Benjamin Levin; Alexandra Tamposi; Charlotte Aitchison; Jack Patterson; Magnus August Høiberg	Shawn Mendes; Romance	2019	
"Set Me Free (Feel My Pain)"	Charli XCX	Charlotte Aitchison; Ariel Rechtshaid; Dimitri Tikovoï	True Romance	2012	
"Shake It"	Charli XCX featuring Big Freedia, Cupcakke, Brooke Candy and Pabllo Vittar	Charlotte Aitchison; Alexander Guy Cook; Nicolas Petitfrère; Elizabeth Harris; Freddie Ross Jr. Pabllo Vittar; Rodrigo Gorky; Pablo Bispo; Arthur Marques; Zebu; Maffalda	Charli	2019	
"Shut Up"	—N/a	Charlotte Aitchison; Jonnali Parmenius; Jarrad Rogers	—N/a	Unreleased	
"Silver Cross"	Charli XCX	Charlotte Aitchison; Alexander Guy Cook	Charli	2019	
"Six Six Six"	Nasty Cherry	Charlotte Aitchison; Gabbriette; Chloe Chaidez; Deborah Knox-Hewson; Georgia Somary; Yves Rothman	The Movie	2021	
"Smile"	Benga	Adegbenga Adejumo; Charlotte Aitchison; Rowan Jones	Chapter II	2013	
"So Alive"	Neon Jungle	Ana Diaz; Charlotte Aitchison; Jarrad Rogers	Welcome to the Jungle	2014	
"So Far Away"	Charli XCX	Charlotte Aitchison; Todd Rundgren (Note: "So Far Away" uses the instrumental of the song of the same name by Paul White which contains a sample of "A Dream Goes on Forever" by Todd Rundgren.); Paul White	Heartbreaks and Earthquakes; True Romance	2012	
"So I"	Charli XCX	Charlotte Aitchison; Finn Keane; Jon Shave	Brat	2024	
"So I featuring A.G. Cook"	Charli XCX featuring A. G. Cook	Charlotte Aitchison; Finn Keane; Jon Shave; Alexander Guy Cook	Brat and It's Completely Different but Also Still Brat	2024	
"So Much Harder"	—N/a	Charlotte Aitchison; Uzoechi Emenike	—N/a	Unreleased	
"So Over You"	Charli XCX	Charlotte Aitchison; Benjamin Levin; Shahid Khan	Sucker	2014	
"Someone New"	Astrid S	Astrid Smeplass; Jonnali Parmenius; Charlotte Aitchison; Jakob Hazell; Svante Halldin	Trust Issues	2019	
"Sorry If I Hurt You"	Charli XCX	Charlotte Aitchison; Andrew Wyatt; Jonnali Parmenius; Linus Wiklund; Deaton Chris Anthony	Crash	2022	
"Speed Drive"	Charli XCX	Charlotte Aitchison; Finn Keane; Klas Åhlund (Note: "Speed Drive" contains samples of "Cobrastyle", written by Klas Åhlund, Joakim Åhlund, David James Parker, Patrick Arve, Ewart Brown, Fabian Torsson, Troy Rami, Paul Rota and Sylvia Robinson, performed by Teddybears featuring Mad Cobra.); Joakim Åhlund; David James Parker; Patrick Arve; Ewart Brown; Fabian Torsson; Troy Rami; Paul Rota; Sylvia Robinson; Mike Chapman (Note: "Speed Drive" also contains interpolations of "Mickey", written by Mike Chapman and Nicky Chinn, performed by Toni Basil.); Nicky Chinn	Barbie the Album	2023	
"Spicy"	Herve Pagez and Diplo featuring Charli XCX	Spice Girls (Note: "Spicy" contains interpolations of "Wannabe", written by Spice Girls, Richard Stannard and Matt Rowe, performed by the former.); Richard Stannard; Matt Rowe; Charlotte Aitchison; Emmanuel Valere; Joel Jaccoulet	Non-album single	2019	
"Spinning"	No Rome with Charli XCX and The 1975	Guendoline Rome Gomez; Charlotte Aitchison; Matthew Healy; George Daniel; Andrew Wyatt	Non-album single	2021	
"Spoons"	Charli XCX	Charlotte Aitchison; Piers Aggett (Note: "Spoons" uses the instrumental of the song of the same name, written by Piers Aggett and recorded by Rudimental.)	Heartbreaks and Earthquakes	2012	
"Spring Breakers"	Charli XCX	Charlotte Aitchison; Alexander Guy Cook; Finn Keane; Jon Shave	Brat and It's the Same but There's Three More Songs So It's Not	2024	
"Spring Breakers featuring Kesha"	Charli XCX featuring Kesha	Charlotte Aitchison; Alexander Guy Cook; Finn Keane; Jon Shave; Kesha Sebert	Brat and It's Completely Different but Also Still Brat	2024	
"SS26"	Charli XCX	Charlotte Aitchison; Alexander Guy Cook; Finn Keane	Music, Fashion, Film	2026	
"Stay Away"	Charli XCX	Charlotte Aitchison; Ariel Rechtshaid	True Romance	2011	
"Sucker"	Charli XCX	Charlotte Aitchison; Justin Raisen; Jeremiah Raisen	Sucker	2014	
"SuperLove"	Charli XCX	Charlotte Aitchison; Patrik Berger	Non-album single	2013	
"Supernova"	Charli XCX	Charlotte Aitchison; Matt Squire	—N/a	Unreleased	
"Supermodels and Holiday Stunners"	Charli XCX	Charlotte Aitchison ‡	14	2008	
"Sweat"	Charli XCX	Charlotte Aitchison; Gregory "Aldae" Hein; Tove Lo; Ian Kirkpatrick; Rami Yacoub	—N/a	Unreleased	
"Sympathy Is a Knife"	Charli XCX	Charlotte Aitchison; Finn Keane; Jon Shave	Brat	2024	
"Sympathy Is a Knife featuring Ariana Grande"	Charli XCX featuring Ariana Grande	Charlotte Aitchison; Finn Keane; Jon Shave; Ariana Grande	Brat and It's Completely Different but Also Still Brat	2024	
"Take My Hand"	Charli XCX	Charlotte Aitchison; Ariel Rechtshaid; Justin Raisen	True Romance	2012	
"Talk Talk"	Charli XCX	Charlotte Aitchison; Alexander Guy Cook; Ross Birchard	Brat	2024	
"Talk Talk featuring Troye Sivan"	Charli XCX featuring Troye Sivan	Charlotte Aitchison; Alexander Guy Cook; Ross Birchard; Troye Sivan; Brett McLaughlin; Kaelyn Behr; Kevin Hickey; Adam Novodor	Brat and It's Completely Different but Also Still Brat	2024	
"Taxi"	Charli XCX	Charlotte Aitchison; Klas Åhlund; Jonnali Parmenius; Sophie Xeon	—N/a	Unreleased	
"Tears"	Charli XCX featuring Caroline Polachek	Charlotte Aitchison; Alexander Guy Cook; Caroline Polachek	Pop 2	2017	
"Tears & Tantrums"	Xylø	Paige Duddy; Rachel Keen; Charlotte Aitchison; Fred Gibson; Frederik Castenschiold Eichen; Lee Newell	Non-album single	2018	
"Telephone"	Charli XCX	Charlotte Aitchison; Stefan Gräslund; Patrik Berger	—N/a	Unreleased	
"Theme Park"	—N/a	Charlotte Aitchison; Jonnali Parmenius; Jarrad Rogers	—N/a	Unreleased	
"Theme Tune"	—N/a	Charlotte Aitchison; Uzoechi Emenike	—N/a	Unreleased	
"Thoughts"	Charli XCX	Charlotte Aitchison; Alexander Guy Cook	Charli	2019	
"Tonight"	Blondie featuring Laurie Anderson	Charlotte Aitchison; Andrew Armstrong	Pollinator	2017	
"Track 10"	Charli XCX	Charlotte Aitchison; Alexander Guy Cook; Tor Erik Hermansen; Mikkel Storleer Eriksen; Jonnali Parmenius; Alexandra Yatchenko	Pop 2	2017	
"Trophy"	Charli XCX	Charlotte Aitchison; Sophie Xeon; Jonnali Parmenius; Amanda Lucille Warner; Patrik Berger	Vroom Vroom	2016	
"Twice"	Charli XCX	Charlotte Aitchison; Jonnali Parmenius; Linus Wiklund	Crash	2022	
"Unlock It"	Charli XCX featuring Kim Petras and Jay Park	Charlotte Aitchison; Alexander Guy Cook; Kim Petras; Jay Park	Pop 2	2017	
"Used to Know Me"	Charli XCX	Charlotte Aitchison; Jonnali Parmenius; Linus Wiklund; Dylan Brady; Fred McFarlane (Note: "Used to Know Me" contains samples of "Show Me Love", written by Fred McFarlane and Allen George, performed by Robin S.); Allen George	Crash	2022	
"Velvet Dreaming (Luv)"	Charli XCX	Charlotte Aitchison; Charlie Yin (Note: "Velvet Dreaming (Luv)" uses the instrumental of "Luv", written and recorded by Giraffage.)	Super Ultra	2012	
"Violins"	—N/a	Charlotte Aitchison; Uzoechi Emenike	—N/a	Unreleased	
"Visions"	Charli XCX	Charlotte Aitchison; Alexander Guy Cook; BJ Burton	How I'm Feeling Now	2020	
"Vitality"	—N/a	Charlotte Aitchison; Uzoechi Emenike	—N/a	Unreleased	
"Von Dutch"	Charli XCX	Charlotte Aitchison; Finn Keane	Brat	2024	
"Von Dutch A.G. Cook remix featuring Addison Rae"	Charli XCX featuring Addison Rae and A. G. Cook	Charlotte Aitchison; Finn Keane; Alexander Guy Cook; Addison Rae	Brat and It's Completely Different but Also Still Brat	2024	
"Vroom Vroom"	Charli XCX	Charlotte Aitchison; Sophie Xeon; Amanda Lucille Warner; Jonnali Parmenius	Vroom Vroom	2016	
"Wall of Sound"	Charli XCX	Charlotte Aitchison; Finn Keane	Wuthering Heights	2026	
"Warm"	Charli XCX featuring Haim	Charlotte Aitchison; Alexander Guy Cook; Este Haim; Danielle Haim; Alana Haim	Charli	2019	
"Warrior"	—N/a	Charlotte Aitchison; Uzoechi Emenike	—N/a	Unreleased	
"Watch the Rain"	Charli XCX	Charlotte Aitchison ‡	14	2008	
"We Lost the Summer"	TXT	Charlotte Aitchison; Charlotte Grace Victoria Lee; Colton Ward; Slow Rabbit; Pdogg; Kyle Bladt; Knudsen; Lil 27 Club	Minisode1: Blue Hour	2020	
"Welcome to My Island" (Remix)	Caroline Polachek featuring George Daniel and Charli XCX	Caroline Polachek; Charlotte Aitchison; Dan Nigro; James Stack	Non-album single	2022	
"What I Like"	Charli XCX	Charlotte Aitchison; Joseph Zucco	True Romance	2012	
"What You Think About Me"	Charli XCX	Charlotte Aitchison; Alexander Guy Cook; Waylon Rector	Crash	2022	
"When I Find Love Again"	James Blunt	Steve Mac; Benjamin Levin; Ammar Malik; Daniel Omelio; Ross Golan; Charlotte Aitchison	Moon Landing	2014	
"White Mercedes"	Charli XCX	Charlotte Aitchison; Andrew Wotman; Ali Tamposi; Nathan Perez	Charli	2019	
"White Roses"	Charli XCX	Charlotte Aitchison; Alexander Guy Cook; Jonnali Parmenius	Number 1 Angel	2017	
"Win"	Nasty Cherry	Charlotte Aitchison; Gabbriette; Chloe Chaidez; Deborah Knox-Hewson; Georgia Somary; Justin Raisen	Season 1	2019	
"Wink Wink"	Charli XCX	Charlotte Aitchison; Finn Keane	Music, Fashion, Film	2026	
"X-Ray Spex"	Bella Thorne	Charlotte Aitchison; Allan Grigg; Jacob Kasher Hindlin	—N/a	Unreleased	
"Xcxoplex"	A. G. Cook with Charli XCX	Alexander Guy Cook; Charlotte Aitchison	Apple vs. 7G	2021	
"XXXTC"	Brooke Candy featuring Charli XCX and Maliibu Miitch	Brooke Candy; Ashton Casey; Charlotte Aitchison; Jennifer Roberts; Oscar Scheller	Sexorcism	2019	
"Yeah"	Charli XCX	Charlotte Aitchison; Alexander Guy Cook; Finn Keane	Music, Fashion, Film	2026	
"Yet Again"	Charli XCX	Charlotte Aitchison ‡	14	2008	
"You (Ha Ha Ha)"	Charli XCX	Charlotte Aitchison; Joakim Åhlund; Derwin Schlecker (Note: "You (Ha Ha Ha)" contains a sample of "You", written and produced by Gold Panda.)	True Romance	2012	
"You for Me"	Sigala featuring Rita Ora	Charlotte Aitchison; Alexander Guy Cook; Bruce Fielder; Finn Keane; Madison Love; Rita Ora	Non-album single	2021	
"You're Not Made for Love"	—N/a	Charlotte Aitchison; Fraser T. Smith	—N/a	Unreleased	
"You're the One"	Charli XCX	Charlotte Aitchison; Patrik Berger	You're the One; True Romance	2012	
"Yuck"	Charli XCX	Charlotte Aitchison; Mike Wise; Elizabeth Lowell Boland; Megan Buelow; Nathan Ferraro	Crash	2022	

== Score ==
This is a list of score Charli XCX has composed for films, television series, and other visual media.

Bottoms (Original Motion Picture Score) (2023) (with Leo Birenberg)
No.	Title	Music	Length
1.	"Bottoms"	Charlotte Aitchison; Leo Birenberg
2.	"Yes No Okay"	Aitchison
3.	"School Fair"	Aitchison; Birenberg
7.	"Lockers"	Aitchison; Birenberg
9.	"Mr. G"	Aitchison; Birenberg
10.	"Teaching Each Other"	Aitchison; Birenberg
12.	"Josie at Juvie"	Aitchison; Birenberg
14.	"Car Wash"	Aitchison; Birenberg
17.	"All Night"	Aitchison; Birenberg
18.	"Be With"	Aitchison; Birenberg
21.	"The Final Fucking Hour"	Aitchison; Birenberg
24.	"Pineapple Juice"	Aitchison; Birenberg
25.	"Final Face-Off"	Aitchison; Birenberg
27.	"Dream (Alternate Fight Sequence)"	Aitchison; Birenberg

Overcompensating (Prime Video Original Series Soundtrack) (2025) (Alex Somers)
No.	Title	Music	Length
1.	"Crush"	Aitchison; George Daniel
4.	"Reappear"	Aitchison; Daniel; Amber Bain; Alex Somers
5.	"Uh-Huh"	Aitchison; Daniel
6.	"Tightrope"	Aitchison; Daniel; Somers
10.	"Run Away"	Aitchison; Daniel; Somers
12.	"The Very First Time"	Aitchison; Daniel
15.	"Spiraling"	Aitchison; Daniel; Somers
16.	"Apartness"	Aitchison; Daniel; Somers
23.	"Germany"	Aitchison; Daniel
31.	"Wished"	Aitchison; Daniel; Somers
