= Charli and Jack Do America Tour =

2015 concert tour by Charli XCX and Bleachers

- Tour by Charli XCX & Bleachers
- Associated albums: Sucker; Strange Desire
- Start date: 21 July 2015
- End date: 10 October 2015
- Legs: 2
- No. of shows: 13 in United States; 13 Total for North America
Charli XCX tour chronology
Girl Power North America Tour (2014)	Charli and Jack Do America Tour (2015)	Charli Live Tour (2019–2020)
Bleachers tour chronology
Come Alive! Tour (2014)	Charli and Jack Do America Tour (2015)	Gone Now Era Tour (2017–2018)

The Charli and Jack Do America Tour (also known as The America Tour) was a co-headlining tour by British singer Charli XCX and American rock band Bleachers in support of their respective albums Sucker and Strange Desire during the summer of 2015.

As the second leg of the tour approached, Charli XCX withdrew which resulted in the cancellation of all that leg's shows. Charli XCX stated on social media that she made this decision for "personal reasons". Although the second leg was cancelled, Shadow of The City, a new festival curated by Jack Antonoff, was still scheduled to take place.

== Musicians ==
Charli XCX's live band consisted of Debbie Knox-Hewson (drums), Vicky Warwick (bass) and JinJoo Lee (guitar). Bleachers included the musicians Jon Shiffman (drums), Sean Hutchinson (drums), Mikey Freedom Hart (bass), and Evan Smith (keyboards, saxophone).

== Opening act ==
- Børns
- Robert DeLong

== Set list ==
This is the setlist from one show and does not apply to every show on the tour.

=== Charli XCX ===
1. "Sucker"
2. "Breaking Up"
3. "I Love It"
4. "Famous"
5. "SuperLove"
6. "Doing It"
7. "Need Ur Luv"
8. "Allergic To Love"
9. "Mow That Lawn"
10. "Body of My Own"
11. "London Queen"
12. "Break the Rules"
13. "Gold Coins"

Encore

14. "Grins"
15. "Fancy"
16. "Boom Clap"

=== Bleachers ===
1. "Shadow"
2. "Wild Heart"
3. "Wake Me"
4. "Reckless Love"
5. "Dreams" (The Cranberries cover)
6. "Rollercoaster"
7. "Shadow of the City"
8. "You're Still a Mystery"
9. "Only One" (Kanye West cover)
10. "I Wanna Get Better"

== Tour dates ==
Date	City	Country	Venue
21 July 2015	San Diego	United States	Observatory North Park
22 July 2015	Costa Mesa	United States	Pacific Amphitheatre
23 July 2015	Oakland	United States	Fox Theater
25 July 2015	Seattle	United States	Showbox SoDo
26 July 2015	Portland	United States	Crystal Ballroom
29 July 2015	Denver	United States	The Fillmore Auditorium
4 August 2015	Minneapolis	United States	Cabooze
5 August 2015	Milwaukee	United States	Eagles Ballroom
7 August 2015	Tulsa	United States	Cain's Ballroom
8 August 2015	Kansas City	United States	Starlight Theatre
9 August 2015	St. Louis	United States	The Pageant
11 August 2015	Detroit	United States	The Fillmore Detroit
12 August 2015	Columbus	United States	The LC Pavilion

== Cancelled shows ==
List of cancelled concerts, showing date, city, country, venue, and reason for cancellation
Date	City	Country	Venue	Reason
14 September 2015	Boston	United States	House of Blues	Personal reasons
16 September 2015	Wallingford	United States	The Dome	Personal reasons
18 September 2015	Philadelphia	United States	Festival Pier	Personal reasons
21 September 2015	New York City	United States	Central Park SummerStage	Personal reasons
23 September 2015	Washington, D.C.	United States	Echostage	Personal reasons
25 September 2015	Tampa	United States	Jannus Landing	Personal reasons
27 September 2015	Orlando	United States	House Blues	Personal reasons
1 October 2015	Dallas	United States	House of Blues	Personal reasons
3 October 2015	Houston	United States	House of Blues	Personal reasons
6 October 2015	Los Angeles	United States	Hollywood Palladium	Personal reasons
8 October 2015	Tempe	United States	Marquee Theatre	Personal reasons
9 October 2015	Las Vegas	United States	Boulevard Pool at The Cosmopolitan	Personal reasons
10 October 2015	Salt Lake City	United States	The Complex	Personal reasons
