= Girl Power North America Tour =

2014 concert tour by Charli XCX

- Tour by Charli XCX
- Associated album: Sucker
- Start date: 26 September 2014
- End date: 25 October 2014
- Legs: 1
- No. of shows: 18 in United States; 2 in Canada; 20 total for North America

Charli XCX concert chronology
- Girl Power North America Tour (2014); Charli and Jack Do America Tour (2015)

The Girl Power North America Tour (also known as North American Tour) was the debut solo concert tour by British singer Charli XCX, in support of her second studio album Sucker (2014). The tour also features songs from her debut studio album, True Romance (2013). Elliphant and Femme were featured as opening acts.

== Set list ==
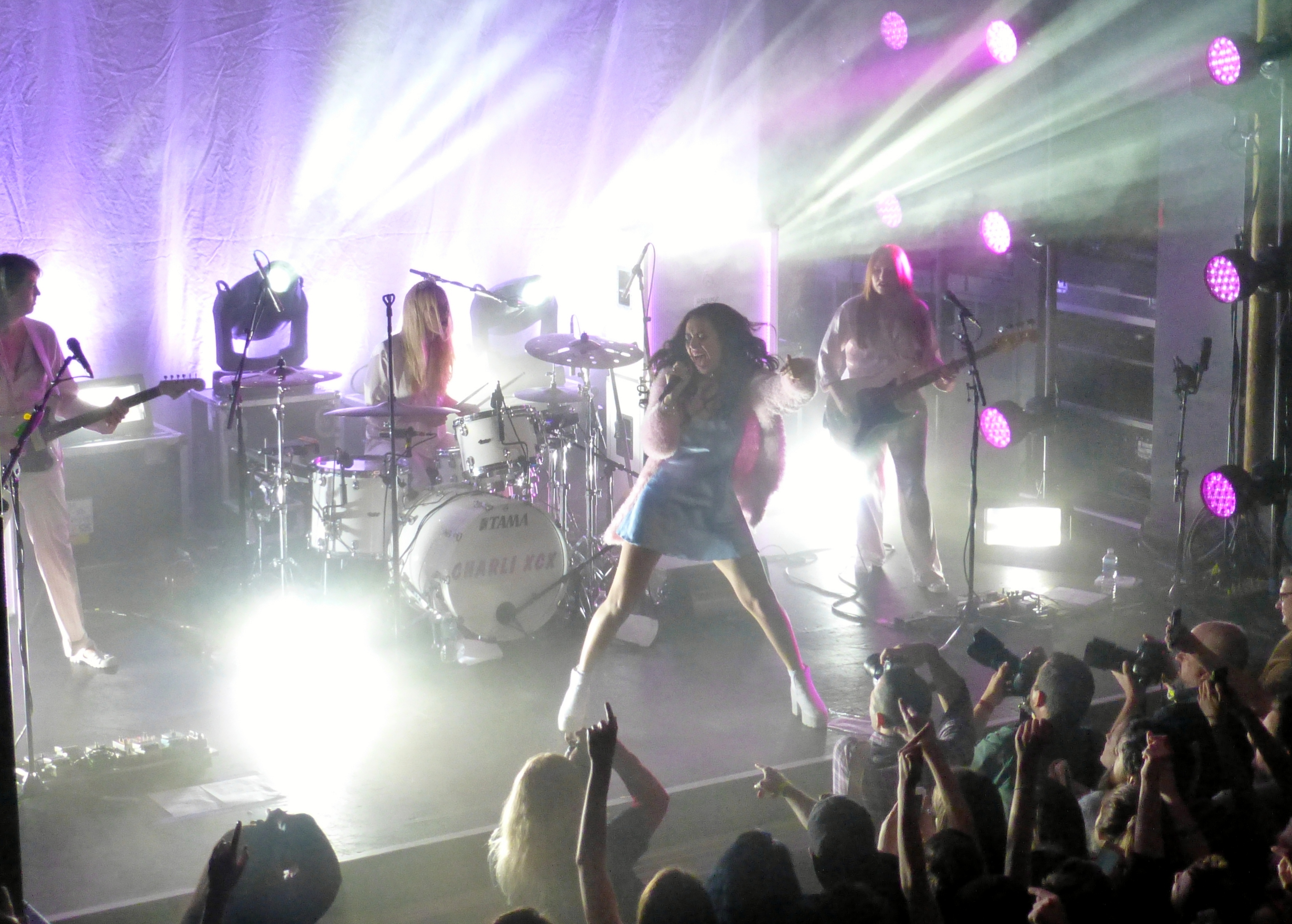
Performance in Detroit

1. "Sucker"
2. "Breaking Up"
3. "I Love It"
4. "Famous"
5. "SuperLove"
6. "Black Roses"
7. "Lock You Up" (contains elements of "Nuclear Seasons")
8. "Caught in the Middle"
9. "Need Ur Luv"
10. "Stay Away"
11. "You (Ha Ha Ha)"
12. "Money (That's What I Want)" (The Flying Lizards cover)
13. "London Queen"
14. "Break the Rules"
15. "Grins"
16. "Gold Coins"

Encore

17. "Fancy (GTA Remix)"
18. "Boom Clap"

== Broadcasts and recordings ==
On 13 October 2014, the show at Lincoln Hall was streamed live on Yahoo's website.

== Tour dates ==
Date (2014)	City	Country	Venue
26 September	Orlando	United States	The Social
27 September	Fort Lauderdale	United States	Culture Room
29 September	Jacksonville Beach	United States	Freebird Live
30 September	Charlotte	United States	Amos' Southend
2 October	Washington, D.C.	United States	9:30 Club
3 October	Philadelphia	United States	Theatre of Living Arts
4 October	Boston	United States	Royale Boston
7 October	New York City	United States	Webster Hall
9 October	Montreal	Canada	Virgin Mobile Corona Theatre
10 October	Toronto	Canada	The Hoxton
11 October	Detroit	United States	Saint Andrew's Hall
13 October	Chicago	United States	Lincoln Hall
14 October	St. Louis	United States	The Ready Room
16 October	Houston	United States	Fitzgerald's
17 October	Austin	United States	Emo's
18 October	Dallas	United States	Trees
20 October	Phoenix	United States	The Crescent Ballroom
21 October	San Diego	United States	House of Blues
24 October	Los Angeles	United States	Mayan Theater
25 October	San Francisco	United States	Slim's

=== Box office score data ===
Venue	City	Tickets sold / available	Gross revenue
9:30 Club	Washington D.C.	1,200 / 1,200 (100%)	$26,400
Virgin Mobile Corona Theatre	Montreal	461 / 575 (80%)	$7,658
Mayan Theatre	Los Angeles	1,300 / 1,300 (100%)	$28,600
Emo's	Austin	900 / 900 (100%)	$16,278
TOTAL (for the 8 concerts listed)		3,861 / 3,975 (97%)	$78,936
