= Stand For =

Single by Ty Dolla Sign
- Released: November 17, 2014
- Recorded: 2014
- Length: 3:20
- Label: Taylor Gang; Atlantic
- Producers: DJ Dahi; Diplo

Ty Dolla Sign singles chronology
"My Main" (2014)	"Stand For" (2014)	"Drop That Kitty" (2015)

"Stand For" is a song written and performed by American singer Ty Dolla Sign. It was released as a single on November 17, 2014. After the release of the song it was reported that it will be included in Ty's debut studio album, Free TC, but it didn't make the final track listing. "Stand For" was produced by DJ Dahi and Diplo. The song has since peaked at number 10 on the US Bubbling Under R&B/Hip-Hop Songs chart.

== Music video ==
The song's official music video, directed by creative collective The Sacred Egg, was released on December 1, 2014.

== Remix ==
On January 23, 2015, DJ Mustard released a remix of the song featuring his own production.

== Track listing ==
Digital download

No.	Title	Producer(s)	Length
1.	"Stand For"	DJ Dahi; Diplo	3:20

== Chart performance ==
Chart (2014)	Peak position
US Bubbling Under R&B/Hip-Hop Singles (Billboard)	10
