= After the Afterparty =

Single by Charli XCX featuring Lil Yachty
- Released: 28 October 2016
- Genre: Synthpop
- Length: 3:39
- Label: Asylum; Atlantic UK
- Songwriters: Charlotte Aitchison; Miles McCollum; Rachel Keen; Fred Gibson; Sophie Xeon; M.S. Eriksen; T.E. Hermansen; Eyelar Mirzazadeh
- Producers: Stargate; Fred; Sophie

Charli XCX singles chronology
"Famous" (2015)	"After the Afterparty" (2016)	"Crazy Crazy" (2017)

Lil Yachty singles chronology
"Talk Too Much" (2016)	"After the Afterparty" (2016)	"iSpy" (2016)

Music video
- "After the Afterparty" on YouTube

"After the Afterparty" is a single by British singer Charli XCX featuring American rapper Lil Yachty. It was released on 28 October 2016 by Asylum Records and Atlantic Records UK intended as the lead single from XCX's scrapped third studio album, commonly referred to by fans as XCX World. However, the song became a stand-alone single when tracks from the project were leaked online and the album was ultimately cancelled.

== Critical reception ==
Ailbhe Malone of The Irish Times called the song "a turned-up banger, similar to 'We Can't Stop' by Miley Cyrus", but also claiming that it had a "layer of modernist gloss" due to the input of Sophie. Laura Snapes of Pitchfork described the song's "neon nihilism and aggressive self-possession are the drivers of Charli's career rather than its destructors" and commented on Charli XCX's vocals at the end of track beginning to "slip and stutter". NME named it the tenth best song of 2016 on their year-end list.

== Music video ==
The music video for "After the Afterparty" was released on 30 October 2016. The video was directed by Diane Martel, and features Charli XCX and Yachty partying with people dressed as zombies and other creatures for Halloween. A. G. Cook and Sophie both appear in the video as zombies.

== Live performances ==
In November 2016, XCX sang "After the Afterparty" during the finale of The X Factor Australia. On 8 February 2017, XCX performed it on Jimmy Kimmel Live!.

== Track listing ==
Digital download
No.	Title	Length
1.	"After the Afterparty" (featuring Lil Yachty)	3:39

Digital download – Acoustic Version
No.	Title	Length
1.	"After the Afterparty" (Acoustic)	3:37

Digital download – Remixes
No.	Title	Length
1.	"After the Afterparty" (Jax Jones remix)	3:52
2.	"After the Afterparty" (Danny L Harle remix)	3:45
3.	"After the Afterparty" (Chocolate Puma Remix)	4:50
4.	"After the Afterparty" (Vice Remix)	3:28
Total length:		15:00

Digital download – Remixes
No.	Title	Length
1.	"After the Afterparty" (Acoustic)	3:37
2.	"After the Afterparty" (Alan Walker Remix; featuring Lil Yachty)	3:17

Digital download – VIP Mix
No.	Title	Length
1.	"After the Afterparty" (featuring Raye, Stefflon Don and Rita Ora)	3:13

Digital download – Alan Walker Remix
No.	Title	Length
1.	"After the Afterparty" (Alan Walker remix)	3:16

== Charts ==
Chart performance for "After the Afterparty"
Chart (2016–2017)	Peak position
Australia (ARIA)	30
Czech Republic Airplay (ČNS IFPI)	17
Ireland (IRMA)	44
New Zealand Heatseekers (RMNZ)	7
Scottish Singles Sales (Official Charts)	15
Sweden Heatseeker (Sverigetopplistan) Alan Walker remix	13
UK Singles (Official Charts)	29

== Certifications ==
Certifications for "After the Afterparty"
Region	Certification	Certified units/sales
Australia (ARIA)	Platinum	70,000^{‡}
United Kingdom (BPI)	Gold	400,000^{‡}
^{‡} Sales+streaming figures based on certification alone.
