= Gabbriette =

American model and musician (born 1997)

- Born: Gabriella Leigh Bechtel; July 28, 1997 (age 29); Orange County, California, U.S.
- Other name: Gabi
- Occupations: Model; musician; actress
- Spouse: Matty Healy (m. 2026)
- Modeling information
- Height: 5 ft 4 in (163 cm)
- Hair color: Black
- Eye color: Brown
- Agency: CAA Fashion
- Musical career
- Genres: Punk rock
- Instruments: Vocals
- Member of: Nasty Cherry

Gabriella Leigh Bechtel (born July 28, 1997), known mononymously as Gabbriette, is an American model and musician. She was known as the lead vocalist and songwriter of the punk rock band Nasty Cherry before gaining wider recognition as a model. (Note: Attributed to multiple sources:) Known for her gothic and indie sleaze aesthetic, Gabbriette has been called an "it girl" by several media outlets, and is at the forefront of what has been dubbed the "Succubus Chic" trend.

== Early life ==
Gabriella Leigh Bechtel was born on July 28, 1997, in Orange County, California to a Mexican mother and a Swiss-German father. Growing up, she recalled: "The majority of students at my high school were beautiful, strictly white blonde girls, and my sister and I were 'Hispanic'. I was called some pretty awful things. But then I just learned to laugh at it."

She credits her love for food and culinary skills to her multicultural upbringing, saying: "There were all these different cultures colliding in our house. They were really experimental and would always have copies of Bon Appétit laid out. My mom would always be putting a twist on a recipe and my dad would be grilling something or making sauerkraut. Family meals were a big part of our life. We'd sit down together after school without our phones and talk about our day, and the cooking process was always a big part of that."

== Career ==
After graduating from high school, Gabbriette moved to Los Angeles to pursue a career in ballet. She then landed a job as a dancer for Blood Orange's videos on MTV, but was cut from the project. She caught the attention of model scouts and eventually signed with a modeling agency. She has since starred in campaigns for Jimmy Choo, Marc Jacobs, Nike, Savage X Fenty, Bottega Veneta, Agent Provocateur, Juicy Couture, and Betsy Johnson to name a few. She has also walked the runway for Gucci, Fendi, Alexander Wang, Diesel, and Dsquared2 among others, and has featured in several editorials and magazine covers, including CR Fashion Book, Dazed, L'Officiel, and Vogue CS.

Gabbriette, who has previously photographed digital stories for V Magazine and Vogue.com, had a photography exhibition in 2016 to launch her limited capsule collection with Junk Food Clothing.

In 2018, Gabbriette was sought out by English pop singer Charli XCX, with whom she has worked before on a music video, to be the lead vocalist of punk rock band Nasty Cherry. Since then, she has released three EPs with the band and appeared in the Netflix documentary I'm with the Band: Nasty Cherry (2019).

Gabbriette is also recognized for her recipes and food content. She first started posting videos of herself cooking during the COVID-19 pandemic and has since curated menus for fashion brands. As of 2022, she is working on a cookbook.

In 2024, Gabbriette reunited with Charli XCX in the video for her song "360". Gabbriette is also mentioned in the first verse of the song lyrics: "Call me Gabbriette, you're so inspired". The same year, she collaborated with MAC Cosmetics for limited-edition lip kit.

== Artistry ==
Influenced by female-led and created bands, Gabbriette grew up listening to Dido and Norah Jones, and has looked up to Suzi Quatro, and the Runaways, especially Joan Jett. She has also expressed admiration for Poison Ivy and Gwen Stefani.

== Personal life ==
From 2020 to 2023, Gabbriette dated model Levi Dylan, the son of singer-songwriter Jakob Dylan and the grandson of singer-songwriter Bob Dylan. She entered a relationship with English musician Matty Healy of The 1975 in September 2023. They were married on July 18, 2026 at Castillo del Lago in Los Angeles.

== Discography ==
=== Nasty Cherry ===
==== Extended plays ====
- Season 1 (2019)
- Season 2 (2020)
- The Movie (2021)

==== Singles ====
- "Win" (2019) – vocals, co-writer
- "What Do You Like In Me" (2019) – vocals, co-writer
- "Live Forever" (2019) – vocals, co-writer
- "Music With Your Dad" (2020) – vocals, co-writer
- "Shoulda Known Better" (2020) – vocals, co-writer
- "I Am King" (2020) – vocals, co-writer
- "Lucky" (2021) – vocals, co-writer
- "Her Body" (2021) – vocals, co-writer

== Filmography ==
Year	Title	Role	Notes	Refs.
2016	Ok, Prove It		Short film	
2017	Prada x Elle: The Job Interview	Candy	Short film	
2017	Prada x Elle: X-mas Revenge	Candy	Short film	
2019	I'm with the Band: Nasty Cherry	Herself	Docuseries	
2020	Sorry or What Could Have Been	Young Sid	Short film	
2025	Idiotka	Veronique		
2025	I Know What You Did Last Summer	Tyler Trevino		
