= Drop That Kitty =

Single by Ty Dolla Sign featuring Charli XCX and Tinashe
- Released: February 17, 2015
- Genre: Hip hop
- Length: 3:36
- Label: Atlantic
- Songwriters: Tyrone Griffin Jr.; Charlotte Aitchison; Tinashe Kachingwe; Mikkel S. Eriksen; Tor Erik Hermansen
- Producers: Stargate; Cashmere Cat

Ty Dolla Sign singles chronology
"Stand For" (2014)	"Drop That Kitty" (2015)	"Only Right" (2015)

Charli XCX singles chronology
"Doing It" (2015)	"Drop That Kitty" (2015)	"Famous" (2015)

Tinashe singles chronology
"Body Language" (2014)	"Drop That Kitty" (2015)	"All Hands on Deck" (2015)

Music video
- "Drop That Kitty" on YouTube

"Drop That Kitty" is a song by American singer Ty Dolla Sign featuring British singer Charli XCX and fellow American singer Tinashe, who all wrote the track with its producers Stargate and Cashmere Cat. It was released as digital download in the United States on February 17, 2015, originally intended as the first single from Sign's debut studio album, Free TC (2015), but was later scrapped. Sign sings the track's main verses, while Charli XCX sings its chorus and Tinashe its bridge and pre-chorus hook. The lyrical content in the song serve as a four-step dance instructional and contain several sexual euphemisms and innuendos. It discusses a scenario of meeting someone attractive in a club and communicating basest desires to them, while extolling the virtues of physical flexibility.

The song garnered positive reviews from music critics, who complimented its club and crossover appeal, as well as Charli XCX and Tinashe's vocal delivery. Time called it the sequel and successor to Iggy Azalea's "Fancy" (2014). An accompanying music video for "Drop That Kitty" was filmed in Los Angeles and released on April 15, 2015. There are cameo appearances by Wiz Khalifa, DJ Mustard and O. T. Genasis.

== Background ==
"Drop That Kitty" was produced by Stargate and Cashmere Cat. In January 2015, Sign confirmed that he had collaborated with Charli XCX and Tinashe on his upcoming studio album, Free TC (2015). In an interview with KZON, Charli XCX stated: "I was working on a song for another artist and then Ty came on worked on it too, and it became this song. That's all I can say". On February 10, 2015, images from a music video shot in Los Angeles, which featured Sign, Charli XCX, Tinashe, Wiz Khalifa and Keke Palmer, were leaked online by fan site, Tinashe Brazil. Consequently, "Drop That Kitty" was announced as Sign's upcoming single, featuring Charli XCX and Tinashe. The song premiered online on February 16, 2015. "Drop That Kitty" was released as digital download in the United States on February 17, 2015.

== Composition ==
"Drop That Kitty" (2015)
A 20-second sample of the song's chorus features Charli XCX singing over a minimal, "stinging" beat, before Tinashe follows with her verse.

"Drop That Kitty" is a "club-friendly," hip hop song. It features "bouncy" synthesizer production, finger snaps, and a minimal, "stinging" beat. Sign sings the track's main verses, Charli XCX sings its chorus hook, while Tinashe sings its bridge and chorus pre-hook. Sign and Tinashe solicit a crooning technique in their vocal delivery, with Tinashe's being more melodically influenced, while Charli XCX incorporates her characteristic, pop punk "cheerleader-esque" chanting. The Source wrote, "There's $ign's signature sleaze, XCX’s Top 40, pep rally hook voice, and Tinashe's sexy steez". Musically, "Drop That Kitty" has been compared to Iggy Azalea's "Fancy" (2014), and the works of DJ Mustard. "Drop That Kitty" serves as a departure from Sign's accustomed sound, with some critics stating that his previous single "Stand For" (2014) catered to his core audience, and "Drop That Kitty" to a crossover audience.

The track's lyrical content serve as a four-step dance instructional, consisting of the lines: "Drop that kitty down low," "Pop that kitty down low," "Shop that like a window" and "Take that video phone". It contains several euphemisms and innuendos, namely in Sign's lyrics, "Shake it like a salt shaker" and "Make it clap for a stack". It also includes Sign boasting, "I got a pit bull, make the kitty run from it". The track's lyrics discuss a scenario of meeting someone attractive in a club and communicating basest desires to them, while extolling the virtues of physical flexibility. Jason Lipshutz of Billboard observed, "The command 'pop that kitty down low' is reason to believe that these three are singing about more than domestic pets", while Brenna Ehrlich of MTV News said the track was "decidedly not about mistreating felines". Ian Servantes of Complex noted that "Drop That Kitty" was "highly sexualized" and fitting for clubs of both the stripping and non-stripping variety.

== Critical reception ==
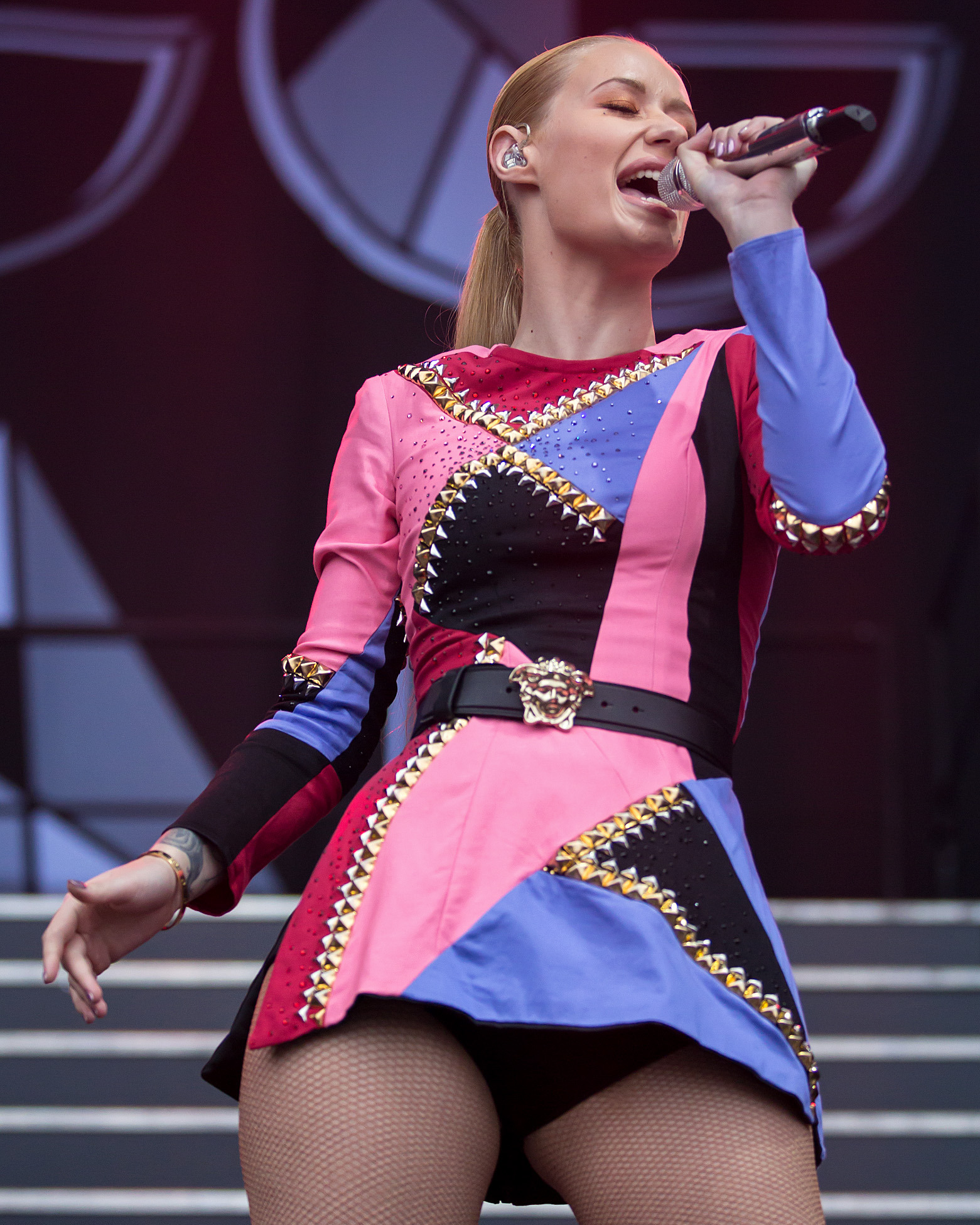
Critics compared the song to "Fancy" by Iggy Azalea.

The song garnered positive reviews from music critics. Jezebel's Jia Tolentino called it "basically 'America the Beautiful' at the club, and of every variety," and added, "I'm just going to be reasonable here and say this is the best song I've ever heard". Paper felt "Drop That Kitty" was "infectious" and an "undeniable jam," and praised Charli XCX's chant and Tinashe's "soulful" crooning. Similarly, Bradley Stern of MuuMuse said the track was a "thumper" and described Tinashe's vocal on it as "beamed in directly from the stars above". In his review of the song, Stern went on to opine, "'Kitty' isn't something any of them would likely drop solo: It's a combined effort of feisty pop hooks, cool crooning and hip-hop heat all in one go". Fuse's Zach Dionne viewed it as "the new ode" to "dropping, popping, clapping, etc". Writing for XXL, Paul Thompson stated that "Drop That Kitty" should become "an inescapable club song" for the Spring of 2015. Ehrlich called it "sexy" and opined that its release would have been fitting to coincide with Valentine's Day. HotNewHipHop's Kevin Goddard, and Rap-Up commended XCX and Tinashe's "commanding" and "catchy" delivery. Robin Murray of Clash commented: "Could it strike big? Well, with a chorus like that there's certainly no reason why it wouldn't...".

Writing for Time, Nolan Feeney said that "Drop That Kitty" was a "worthy successor to 'Fancy'" and called it "the 'Fancy' sequel you didn't know you needed". Feeney, however, opined that XCX and Tinashe did the "heavy lifting" on the track while Sign was "a mere footnote". Conversely, Music Times writer Ryan Middleton felt that Sign "[brought] it home" with the track's main verses. Hip-Hop Wired's Chris Thomas wrote, "Though this record isn't what we're accustomed to hearing from Ty Dolla, don't be surprised if it makes him a more renowned name". Zara Golden of The Fader said the track was "a wash of the wit and unabashed raunch we've come to expect from Ty—but it certainly is more radio-friendly". In a mixed review, Vulture's Dee Lockett felt that the track's collaborators had the potential to produce a song "considerably better" and found the track to have "probably the worst sexual innuendo for pussy poppin' you've ever heard". However, Locket said that the song was "so bad" that it is "almost...good" and commented, "It's like the semi-G-rated-strip-club anthem you never asked for, and we can't stop dancing". In a negative review, James Rettig of Stereogum dismissed "Drop That Kitty" as "pretty lame" and "a poor showing". He criticized Charli XCX for not fitting the song and Sign's "tired lines," but complimented Tinashe's "killer bridge". Rettig went on to comment, " With all of the talent that's involved on the track, it sucks that they didn't use it for something more substantial than a thinly veiled euphemism and a weak hook".

== Live performances ==
Ty Dolla Sign performed the song at the 2015 MTV Movie Awards with Charli XCX and Tinashe. The background dancers wore pink oversized cat masks. Shortly after the performance, Charli XCX released the teaser to the official music video.

== Track listing ==
- Digital download
1. "Drop That Kitty" (featuring Charli XCX and Tinashe) – 3:36

== Charts ==
Chart (2015)	Peak position
Australian Urban Singles (ARIA)	28
Belgium (Ultratip Bubbling Under Wallonia)	18
Belgium Urban (Ultratop Flanders)	37
France (SNEP)	187
US Bubbling Under R&B/Hip-Hop Singles (Billboard)	4
US Rhythmic Airplay (Billboard)	32

== Release history ==
Country	Date	Format	Label	Ref.
Canada	February 17, 2015	Digital download	Atlantic	
United States	February 17, 2015	Digital download	Atlantic	
