= I'm with the Band: Nasty Cherry =

2019 American reality television show

- Genre: Reality television; Music
- Starring: Charli XCX; Emmie Lichtenberg; Gabbriette; Chloe Chaidez; Debbie Knox-Hewson; Georgia Somary
- Composers: Caroline Beatrix Maurin; Alexandre Teiller; Charles Teiller
- Country of origin: United States
- Original language: English
- No. of seasons: 1
- No. of episodes: 6

Production
- Running time: 25-41 minutes
- Production company: Grain Media

Original release
- Network: Netflix
- Release: November 15, 2019

I'm with the Band: Nasty Cherry is a 2019 reality television series. The premise revolves around singer Charli XCX and her friend Emmie Lichtenberg, and their progress creating a new all-female punk rock band managed by Lichtenberg, which Charli XCX dubs "Nasty Cherry".

== Cast ==
- Gabbriette
- Chloe Chaidez
- Debbie Knox-Hewson
- Emmie Lichtenberg
- Georgia Somary
- Dave Stagno
- Charli XCX
- Rex DeTiger
- Sam Pringle
- Parker Silzer IV
- Max Tsiring
- Chayo Bechtel
- Blu DeTiger
- Kitten

== Episodes ==
No.	Title	Original release date
1	"Who the F**k is Nasty Cherry?"	November 15, 2019
Charli XCX aims to create an all-girl rock band.
2	"Nasty Cherry Makes Some Noise"	November 15, 2019
The band begins writing material and sets up a meeting with a Charli's producer.
3	"Nasty Cherry Loves Your Dad"	November 15, 2019
The girls go to the Rose Bowl Flea Market and prepare for their first show.
4	"Nasty Cherry Loses a Cherry"	November 15, 2019
The band builds up a social media presence, but the there is growing friction between the girls.
5	"Nasty Cherry is...Dead?"	November 15, 2019
Guitarist Chloe decides to leave Nasty Cherry. The management tries to negotiate a reconciliation.
6	"Nasty Cherry Need to WIN"	November 15, 2019
Nasty Cherry gets ready to drop their first single and plays the band's first live show at a legitimate venue.

== Release ==
I'm with the Band: Nasty Cherry was released on 15 November 2019, on Netflix.
