= Sucker (Charli XCX album) =

Studio album by Charli XCX
- Released: 15 December 2014
- Recorded: 2013–2014
- Studios: White Bronco (Los Angeles, CA); Rokstone (London, England); Westlake (Los Angeles, CA); "Patrik's House" (Stockholm, Sweden); Ingrid (Stockholm, Sweden); Rodeo Recordings (Los Angeles, CA); Eldorado (Burbank, CA); The Village Recorder (Los Angeles, CA); Sarm West Coast (London, England); Echo (Los Angeles, CA); Matzah Ball (New York, NY); The London Hotel (Los Angeles, CA); F Block (London, England); Gefilte Fish (Brooklyn, NY)
- Genres: Pop; pop-punk; new wave; power pop; electro-punk
- Length: 40:26
- Labels: Asylum; Atlantic
- Producers: Patrik Berger; Benny Blanco; Cashmere Cat; Stefan Gräslund; John Hill; Jerry James; Greg Kurstin; Steve Mac; Mr. Rogers; Naughty Boy; Christian Olsson; Justin L. Raisen; Ariel Rechtshaid; Rostam; Stargate; Young & Sick

Charli XCX chronology
True Romance (2013)	Sucker (2014)	Vroom Vroom (2016)

Singles from Sucker
- 1. "Boom Clap" Released: 17 June 2014; 2. "Break the Rules" Released: 19 August 2014; 3. "Doing It" Released: 3 February 2015; 4. "Famous" Released: 29 May 2015

Sucker (stylised in all caps) is the second studio album by British singer Charli XCX, released on 15 December 2014 by Asylum and Atlantic Records. The album was met with positive reviews from critics, praising its throwback style, and ended up being included on many year-end lists for best albums of 2014. Sucker spawned the singles "Boom Clap", "Break the Rules", "Doing It" (featuring Rita Ora) and "Famous".

Charli XCX promoted the album through a series of public appearances and televised live performances, as well as appearing on the Jingle Ball Tour 2014. The album was supported by Charli XCX's Girl Power North America Tour, which lasted from September to October 2014. She was also the opening act for the European leg of American singer Katy Perry's Prismatic World Tour in 2015.

== Background and composition ==
In 2013, Charli XCX released her first major-label studio album, True Romance. It received positive reviews by music critics, who praised its distinctive style and Charli XCX's artistic personality. (Note: Marc Hogan of Pitchfork noted that Charli "create[s] something distinctive and immediately memorable" and "stamps her personality across the entire project", while AllMusic's Heather Phares observed that she "combin[es] a wide array of pop culture sources into something fresh and familiar" throughout the "consistently catchy and personal" album.) However, the album failed to chart on major markets. (Note: True Romance debuted at number 85 on the UK Albums Chart with 1,241 copies in its first week, and it peaked at numbers five and eleven on the US Heatseekers Albums and Australia's ARIA Hitseekers chart, respectively.) On 13 March 2014, Charli XCX revealed to Complex that she had begun working on her second studio album with Weezer frontman Rivers Cuomo as well as Rostam Batmanglij of Vampire Weekend, and the duo Stargate and John Hill were also confirmed as producers. In an interview with DIY, she stated that she wrote the record for girls and wants them to feel "a sense of empowerment". Charli XCX explained in her tour diary with Replay Laserblast that its genre is still pop, but has "a very shouty, girl-power, girl-gang, Bow Wow Wow" feel to it at the same time. She also said in an interview with Idolator that Sucker would be influenced by the Hives, Weezer, the Ramones and 1960s yé-yé music.

"Boom Clap"
A sample of "Boom Clap" by Charli XCX, released as the lead single from Sucker.

"Break the Rules"
A sample of "Break the Rules" by Charli XCX, released as the second single from Sucker.

Sucker's sounds have been described as pop, pop-punk, new wave, power pop, and electro-punk. "London Queen" combines elements of 1980s punk and bubblegum.

== Promotion ==
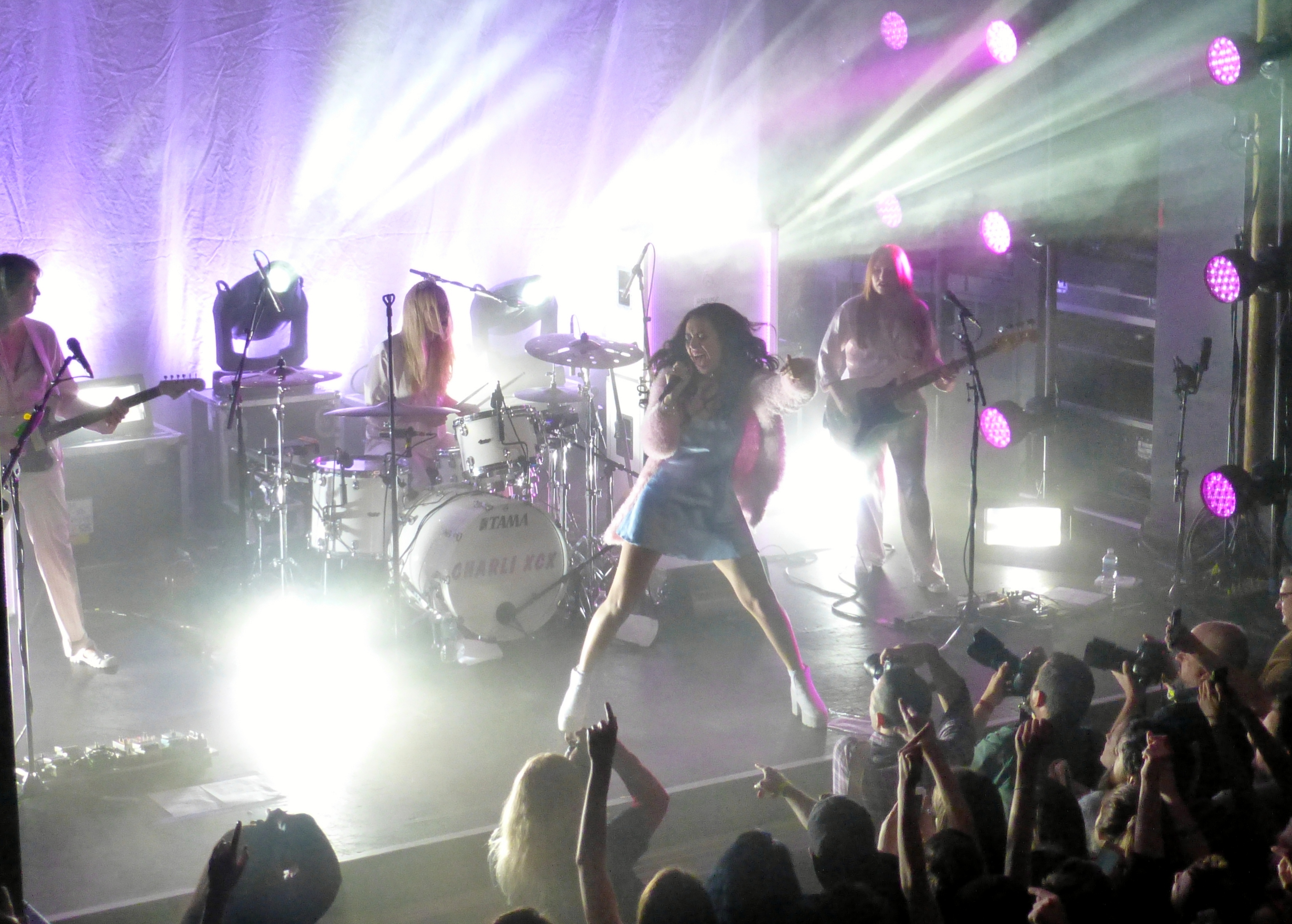
Charli XCX performing in October 2014

Charli XCX's first high-profile performance of "Boom Clap" was at the 2014 MTV Video Music Awards pre-show on 24 August 2014. She later sang the song, followed by "Break the Rules" at the 2014 MTV Europe Music Awards, the American Music Awards of 2014, and on Saturday Night Live. The tracks, "London Queen" and "Gold Coins", premiered in advance of the album's release on 6 October and 17 November, respectively, and a music video for "Breaking Up" was unveiled on 2 December. In November, the album's European bonus track "Red Balloon" was used in a trailer for the 2015 animated film Home, and included on the film's soundtrack, curated by Rihanna.

Originally set to be released in October 2014, Charli XCX postponed its release date to 26 January 2015, due to the commercial success of "Boom Clap". However, on 7 January, it was announced that the European release of the album would be pushed back again to 16 February, featuring a revised track listing that includes the new version of "Doing It" featuring British singer Rita Ora as well as the tracks "So Over You" and "Red Balloon". Charli XCX and Ora performed "Doing It" at The Graham Norton Show on 14 February. In support of the album, Charli XCX embarked on the Girl Power North America Tour in 2014, which kicked off in Orlando, Florida on 26 September and concluded in San Francisco, California on 25 October. She also performed the tracks from Sucker as part of her set for the Jingle Ball Tour 2014 and supported American singer Katy Perry on European dates of her Prismatic World Tour in February and March 2015. Charli XCX further promoted Sucker by embarking on an eight-date UK tour in 2015, which began in Brighton on 24 March and ended in Birmingham on 2 April. In June 2015, "Die Tonight" was used in the promotional teaser for Fox's forthcoming slasher series Scream Queens.

=== Singles ===
"Boom Clap", the first single released from Sucker, was released worldwide on 17 June 2014. It was originally part of the soundtrack album for The Fault in Our Stars. The song was a commercial success, peaking at number six on the UK Singles Chart and number eight on the Billboard Hot 100. It has since sold more than one million copies in the United States, receiving platinum certification by the Recording Industry Association of America, and has been certified silver by the British Phonographic Industry. The accompanying music video was shot in Amsterdam. The second single, "Break the Rules", was released on 25 August, along with the music video. The song reached number four in Germany, six in Austria, ten in Australia, and the top 40 in Belgium, France, Norway and in Charli XCX's native UK. (Note: Chart positions for Germany, Austria, Australia, Belgium, France, Norway, and the United Kingdom) In the United States, the song peaked at number 91 on the Billboard Hot 100, her second consecutive entry on the chart.

Featuring Rita Ora, a music video for "Doing It" directed by Adam Powell was unveiled on 20 January 2015. On 3 February, the song was released as the album's third single; it peaked at number eight on the UK Singles Chart. The music video for "Famous" was premiered on 23 March, and the song was released as the album's fourth single on 29 May.

== Critical reception ==
Professional ratings
Aggregate scores
Source	Rating
AnyDecentMusic?	7.3/10
Metacritic	75/100
Review scores
Source	Rating
AllMusic	4/5 stars
The A.V. Club	B−
Billboard	4.5/5 stars
Entertainment Weekly	A−
The Guardian	3/5 stars
NME	8/10
Pitchfork	7.6/10
Rolling Stone	4/5 stars
Spin	8/10
USA Today	3/4 stars

Sucker received generally positive reviews from music critics. At Metacritic, which assigns a normalised rating out of 100 to reviews from music critics, Sucker received an average score of 75, based on 25 reviews.

Will Hermes of Rolling Stone stated that "Sucker is no retro gesture: Charli runs the album's rock & roll guitars and attitude through enough distressed digital production and thumb type vernacular to make this the first fully updated iteration of punk pop in ages ... Like so many of the pop pleasures here, it's a sentiment that just never gets old." Miles Raymer of Entertainment Weekly commented that "Sucker is pop-punk, radically redefined and dragged, middle fingers waving, into the future." Brian Mansfield of USA Today wrote, "On Sucker, XCX doesn't just tweak the ear-candy pop template, she blows it up, then pries the shiniest bits from the asphalt. It's still sweet once she's finished sticking it back together, but it's got a bit of crunch, too." At AllMusic, Heather Phares opined that the album's "mix of youth and sophistication is more than a little volatile, and sometimes it feels like XCX is still figuring out what really works for her music ... Nevertheless, it succeeds as an introduction to Charli XCX the Pop Star while retaining her whip-smart songwriting and attitude."

Dan Weiss of Spin expressed that "Sucker is just an exceptionally good pop album ... Those are rare enough as it is." James Rainis of Slant Magazine viewed the album as "the sound of a long-incubating star emerging so fully formed on an international stage that it's difficult to figure that an artist gifted with so much sneering bravado was ever thought of as an underdog ... Someone needed to author the aural equivalent of the body shot, and Charli XCX has provided the platonic ideal of just that: a party album charged equally with punkish rebellion, hip-hop cool, and pop universality." Jamieson Cox of Pitchfork felt that "Sucker isn't an endpoint for Charli ... and it's not her finest work, but it's plenty good enough to rope a cohort of new fans into what's promising to be one hell of a creative ride." Jon Pareles, reviewing positively for The New York Times, emphasises "Sucker is far more direct; it's smart, loud, cheeky, gimmick-loving pop, intent on making every song go bang ... The ambition and calculation on Sucker are overt but not a deal-breaker. It's a brittle, professional album full of sonic treats."

In a 2024 cover story for Billboard, Charli told Kristin Robinson that "she considers 2014's Sucker, for instance, 'an attempt at what Olivia Rodrigo's Sour was able to do much better.'"

=== Accolades ===
Sucker was named the best pop album of the year by Rolling Stone, who said, "Charli XCX is the pop star 2014 was waiting for: a badass songwriting savant who's the most fun girl in any room she steps into. The 22-year-old artist came into her own with Sucker, a middle-finger-waving teenage riot packed into 13 punky gems. It's a dance party, a mosh pit and a feminist rally – Charli's definitely in charge." Spin ranked it the sixth pop album of 2014, commenting that "Charli's second full-length shaves off the densely layered atmospherics and dreamy soundscapes." Meanwhile, Jason Lipshutz from Billboard listed Sucker as the second best pop album of 2014, and NME listed it as the 32nd best album of 2015.

Accolades
Publication	Accolade	Year	Rank
NME	Albums of the Year 2015	2015	32
Rolling Stone	50 Best Albums of 2014	2014	6

== Commercial performance ==
Sucker debuted at number 28 on the US Billboard 200, making it Charli XCX's first album to enter the chart. It entered the UK Albums Chart at number 15, selling 5,622 copies in its first week. The album's UK sales as of May 2020 stood at 46,667 units.

== Track listing ==
North American and Australian edition
No.	Title	Writer(s)	Producer(s)	Length
1.	"Sucker"	Charlotte Aitchison; Justin L. Raisen; Jeremiah Raisen	J.L. Raisen; Jerry James	2:42
2.	"Break the Rules"	Aitchison; Steve Mac; Tor E. Hermansen; Mikkel S. Eriksen; Dan Omelio; Magnus August Høiberg	Mac; Stargate; Cashmere Cat	3:23
3.	"London Queen"	Aitchison; J.L. Raisen; J. Raisen; Ariel Rosenberg; Remi Nicole	J.L. Raisen	2:51
4.	"Breaking Up"	Aitchison; Patrik Berger; Noonie Bao; Markus Krunegård	P. Berger; John Hill^{[a]}	2:17
5.	"Gold Coins"	Aitchison; P. Berger	P. Berger; Hill; Stefan Gräslund^{[b]}	3:02
6.	"Boom Clap"	Aitchison; P. Berger; Fredrik Berger; Gräslund	P. Berger; Gräslund	2:49
7.	"Doing It"	Aitchison; Ariel Rechtshaid; Jarrad Rogers; Noonie Bao; Burns	Rechtshaid; Mr. Rogers	3:48
8.	"Body of My Own"	Aitchison; P. Berger; Christian Olsson	P. Berger; Olsson	2:45
9.	"Famous"	Aitchison; Greg Kurstin	Kurstin	3:52
10.	"Hanging Around"	Aitchison; Rivers Cuomo; J.L. Raisen; J. Raisen	J.L. Raisen	3:18
11.	"Die Tonight"	Aitchison; P. Berger; Noonie Bao; Krunegård; Pontus Winnberg; Rostam Batmanglij; Andrew Wyatt	P. Berger	2:51
12.	"Caught in the Middle"	Aitchison; Benjamin Levin; Nick van Hofwegen	Benny Blanco; Young & Sick	3:01
13.	"Need Ur Luv"	Aitchison; Batmanglij; Noonie Bao; Wyatt	Rostam	3:45
Total length:				40:26

Target exclusive deluxe edition
No.	Title	Writer(s)	Producer(s)	Length
14.	"Money (That's What I Want)"	Janie Bradford; Berry Gordy	J.L. Raisen	2:06
15.	"Break the Rules" (Femme remix)	Aitchison; Mac; Hermansen; Eriksen; Omelio; Høiberg	Mac; Stargate; Cashmere Cat; Mikko Gordon^{[c]}	3:52
Total length:				46:24

European edition, US digital reissue and Australian reissue
No.	Title	Writer(s)	Producer(s)	Length
7.	"Doing It" (featuring Rita Ora)	Aitchison; Rechtshaid; Rogers; Noonie Bao; Burns	Rechtshaid; Mr. Rogers; Josh Gudwin^{[d]}	3:48
8.	"Body of My Own"	Aitchison; P. Berger; Olsson	P. Berger; Olsson	2:45
9.	"Famous"	Aitchison; Kurstin	Kurstin	3:52
10.	"Hanging Around"	Aitchison; Cuomo; J.L. Raisen; J. Raisen	J.L. Raisen	3:18
11.	"So Over You"	Aitchison; Levin; Shahid Khan	Benny Blanco; Naughty Boy	3:08
12.	"Die Tonight"	Aitchison; P. Berger; Noonie Bao; Krunegård; Winnberg; Batmanglij; Wyatt	P. Berger	2:51
13.	"Caught in the Middle"	Aitchison; Levin; Hofwegen	Benny Blanco; Young & Sick	3:01
14.	"Need Ur Luv"	Aitchison; Batmanglij; Noonie Bao; Wyatt	Rostam	3:45
15.	"Red Balloon"	Aitchison; Hermansen; Eriksen; Høiberg	Stargate; Cashmere Cat	3:28
Total length:				47:03

Japanese edition
No.	Title	Writer(s)	Producer(s)	Length
16.	"Break the Rules" (Japanese version) (ブレイク・ザ・ルールズ)	Aitchison; Mac; Hermansen; Eriksen; Omelio; Høiberg; Hiromi Uehara	Mac; Stargate; Cashmere Cat	3:23
17.	"Boom Clap" (Japanese version) (ブーム・クラップ)	Aitchison; P. Berger; F. Berger; Gräslund; Rei Yasuda	P. Berger; Gräslund	2:51
Total length:				53:17

Notes

- ^{^[a]} signifies a co-producer.
- ^{^[b]} signifies an additional producer.
- ^{^[c]} signifies a remixer.
- ^{^[d]} signifies a vocal producer.
- The title track is edited on some physical editions of the album. "Break the Rules", "Breaking Up", "Body of My Own", and "Hanging Around" are not edited.
- The version of "Boom Clap" found on the album is the same from the Japanese music video and is different from the version heard in the original music video and in The Fault in Our Stars.

== Personnel ==
Credits were adapted from the liner notes of "Break the Rules" and the European edition of Sucker.

=== Recording locations ===
- White Bronco Studios; Los Angeles, CA
- Rokstone Studios; London, England
- Westlake Recording Studios; Los Angeles, CA
- "Patrik's House"; Stockholm, Sweden
- Ingrid Studios; Stockholm, Sweden
- Rodeo Recordings; Los Angeles, CA
- Eldorado Recording Studios; Burbank, CA
- The Village Recorder; Los Angeles, CA
- Sarm West Coast; London, England
- Echo Studios; Los Angeles, CA
- Matzah Ball Studios; New York, NY
- The London Hotel; Los Angeles, CA
- F Block Studios; London, England
- Gefilte Fish Studios; Brooklyn, NY

=== Musicians ===
- Charli XCX – vocals, executive production
- Justin L. Raisen – drum programming, guitars, production, engineering (tracks 1, 3, 10); backing vocals, synthesisers (tracks 1, 3); OP-1 (track 10)
- Jerry James – drum programming and production(track 1); bass and engineering (tracks 1, 3); backing vocals (track 3)
- Cashmere Cat – additional programming (track 2); all instruments, programming (track 15), production track 2, 15)
- Chris Laws – drums, engineering (track 2)
- Steve Mac – keys, production (track 2)
- Dano "Robopop" Omelio – guitars (track 2)
- Steve Pearce – bass (track 2)
- Daniel Pursey – percussion, engineering (track 2)
- Macy McCutcheon – additional girl vocals (track 2)
- Bea Rexstrew – additional girl vocals (track 2)
- Kirstin Hume – additional girl vocals (track 2)
- Katie Littlewood – additional girl vocals (track 2)
- Shags Chamberlain – bass, backing vocals (track 3)
- Ariel Pink – synthesisers, mouth organ, backing vocals (track 3)
- Remi Nicole – additional vocals (track 3); backing vocals (track 4)
- Patrik Berger – all instruments, programming (tracks 4, 5, 8, 12); backing vocals (track 12), production (tracks 4–6, 8, 12); engineering (tracks 4, 8, 12)
- John Hill – programming (tracks 4, 5); co-production (track 4); all instruments, production (track 5)
- Markus Krunegård – piano, additional vocals (track 4); all instruments, programming, backing vocals (track 12)
- Noonie Bao – additional vocals (tracks 4, 7, 14)
- Matthew Eccles – drums (track 4)
- Keefus Ciancia – additional keys (track 5)
- Stefan Gräslund – additional programming and additional production (track 5); production (track 6)
- Rita Ora – featured vocals (track 7)
- Mr. Rogers – drums, bass, programming, production, engineering (track 7)
- Ariel Rechtshaid – programming, production (track 7)
- Christian Olsson – all instruments, programming, production (track 8)
- Greg Kurstin – guitar, bass, keys, production, engineering (track 9)
- Aaron Redfield – drums (track 9)
- Naughty Boy – instrumentation, production (track 11)
- Benny Blanco – instrumentation and production (tracks 11, 13); programming (track 13)
- Martin Stilling – all instruments, programming and engineering (track 12), engineering assistance (tracks 4, 8)
- Lars Skoglund – drums (track 12)
- Andrew Wyatt – backing vocals (tracks 12, 14)
- Young & Sick – instrumentation, programming, production (track 13)
- Sarah Chernoff – backing vocals (track 14)
- Angel Deradoorian – backing vocals (track 14)
- Andrew Blakemore – backing vocals (track 14)
- Mikkel S. Eriksen – all instruments, programming, recording (track 15), production (tracks 2, 15)
- Tor Erik Hermansen – all instruments, programming, recording (track 15), production (tracks 2, 15)

=== Production and design ===
- Rob Orton – mixing (tracks 1, 2, 4, 6, 7, 12, 14)
- Tony Lake – additional engineering (tracks 1, 2, 4, 6, 7, 12, 14)
- Caleb Laven – vocal editing (tracks 1, 3)
- Dave Schiffman – mixing (tracks 3, 8, 10)
- Niek Meul – engineering (track 4)
- Chris Kasych – engineering (tracks 4, 5)
- John Morrical – engineering (track 4)
- Martin Cooke – engineering (track 4)
- Mark "Spike" Stent – mixing (tracks 5, 9, 11, 13)
- Geoff Swan – mixing assistance (tracks 5, 9, 11, 13)
- Josh Gudwin – production, recording (Rita Ora's vocals) (track 7)
- Alex Pasco – additional engineering (track 9)
- Julian Burg – additional engineering (track 9)
- Nick Rowe – vocal editing (track 10)
- Chris "Anger Management" Sclafani – engineering (tracks 11, 13)
- Andrew "McMuffin" Luftman – production coordination (tracks 11, 13)
- Seif "Mageef" Hussain – production coordination (tracks 11, 13)
- Rostam – production (track 14)
- Miles Walker – recording (track 15)
- Phil Tan – mixing (track 15)
- Daniela Rivera – additional engineering for mix (track 15)
- Stuart Hawkes – mastering
- Frank Fieber – design, layout
- Harry Fieber – illustration
- Bella Howard – photography

== Charts ==
Chart performance
Chart (2014–2015)	Peak position
Australian Albums (ARIA)	53
Austrian Albums (Ö3 Austria)	44
Belgian Albums (Ultratop Flanders)	61
Belgian Albums (Ultratop Wallonia)	47
Dutch Albums (Album Top 100)	65
French Albums (SNEP)	42
German Albums (Offizielle Top 100)	57
Hungarian Albums (MAHASZ)	13
Irish Albums (IRMA)	17
Italian Albums (FIMI)	81
Japanese Albums (Oricon)	70
Mexican Albums (AMPROFON)	62
Spanish Albums (Promusicae)	59
Swiss Albums (Schweizer Hitparade)	33
UK Albums (Official Charts)	15
US Billboard 200	28

== Certifications ==
Certifications and sales
Region	Certification	Certified units/sales
United Kingdom (BPI)	Silver	60,000^{‡}
^{‡} Sales+streaming figures based on certification alone.

== Release history ==
Release dates and formats
Region	Date	Format	Edition	Label	Ref.
United States	15 December 2014	CD; digital download	Standard	Neon Gold; Atlantic	
Canada	16 December 2014	CD	Standard	Warner	
Canada	19 December 2014	Digital download	Standard	Warner	
Australia	19 December 2014	CD; digital download	Standard	Warner	
France	9 February 2015	CD; digital download	Standard	Warner	
Germany	13 February 2015	CD; digital download	Standard	Warner	
Ireland	13 February 2015	CD; digital download	Standard	Asylum; Atlantic	
Netherlands	13 February 2015	CD; digital download	Standard	Warner	
United Kingdom	16 February 2015	CD; digital download	Standard	Asylum; Atlantic	
Italy	17 February 2015	CD; digital download	Standard	Warner	
Japan	18 February 2015	CD; digital download	Standard	Warner	
United States	10 March 2015	Digital download	Reissue	Neon Gold; Atlantic	
Canada	31 March 2015	LP	Standard	Warner	
United States	31 March 2015	LP	Standard	Neon Gold; Atlantic	
Australia	17 April 2015	CD	Reissue	Warner	
