= Boom Clap =

2014 single by Charli XCX

- Film soundtrack cover art

Single by Charli XCX

from the album The Fault in Our Stars (Music from the Motion Picture) and Sucker
- Released: 17 June 2014
- Studio: The Village Recorder (Los Angeles, CA)
- Genre: Electropop; synth-pop
- Length: 2:49
- Label: Atlantic; Asylum; Warner Bros.; Neon Gold
- Songwriters: Charlotte Aitchison; Fredrik Berger; Patrik Berger; Stefan Gräslund
- Producers: Patrik Berger; Stefan Gräslund

Charli XCX singles chronology
"Fancy" (2014)	"Boom Clap" (2014)	"Break the Rules" (2014)

Music video
- "Boom Clap" on YouTube

"Boom Clap" is a song by British singer Charli XCX, released as the first single from the soundtrack album of The Fault in Our Stars (2014) and is also featured on her second studio album, Sucker. There are two existing mixes of this song: the first and original one is heard in the film and the film's soundtrack; the second mix is heard on Sucker.

The single peaked at number six on the UK Singles Chart and number eight on the US Billboard Hot 100 and topped the Mainstream Top 40, as well as peaking inside the top ten of the charts in Australia, Canada, New Zealand, Ireland and Italy. This song is featured as downloadable content on Just Dance 2015.

== Background and composition ==
"Boom Clap" (2014)
A 16-second sample of "Boom Clap", an electropop song

"Boom Clap" is a "radio-ready" electropop and synth-pop ballad, written by Charli XCX, Fredrik Berger, Patrik Berger and Stefan Gräslund. The song was initially written during writing sessions for XCX's debut studio album, True Romance (2013), then later offered to singer and actress Hilary Duff for her then-upcoming album, Breathe In. Breathe Out. (2015). Once Duff's management declined the offer, XCX decided to use the song as her contribution to The Fault in Our Stars motion picture soundtrack. In a later interview with Popjustice, Duff said she had no idea that XCX had offered the song to her people and would have accepted the song if she had known. The song is composed in the key of E major.

== Critical reception ==
"Boom Clap" received positive reviews from music critics. 4Music said the song was "infectious" and a "feelgood track [which] contrasts softly-sung verses with a big attitude-packed chorus" resulting in a song that was "catchier than the clap." Spin listed "Boom Clap" at number 24 on its list of "The 101 Best Songs of 2014," writing that "Charli XCX's excellent use of onomatopoeia gives this intoxicated Sucker cut her most unforgettable chorus yet." Pitchfork named it the 37th best song of 2014. In January 2015, "Boom Clap" was ranked at number eight on The Village Voice's annual year-end Pazz & Jop critics' poll. In April 2022, Clash listed the song among the 17 best of Charli's songs, with Isabella Miller stating that "it captures the essence of youth culture with timeless stylistic and lyrical content that awakens the 2014 Tumblr teen in us all."

== Commercial performance ==
The song debuted at number 62 on the Billboard Hot 100 on the week dated 21 June 2014, becoming XCX's first entry as a lead artist. On 28 June 2014, the song jumped to number 29, becoming her first top-40 hit as a lead artist. The song became XCX's first top 10 hit as a solo artist (after her features on "I Love It" and "Fancy") and re-entered the top ten twice before peaking at number eight. The song has sold more than 3 million copies in the United States. "Boom Clap" also peaked at number one on the Mainstream Top 40 chart and topped Dance Airplay. In the UK the song has sold over 200,000 copies and has received a silver certification.

== Music videos ==
The accompanying music video for "Boom Clap", directed by Sing J. Lee, was filmed in Amsterdam and premiered on 2 June 2014. The video features brief clips from The Fault in Our Stars set to the song as well as on-screen text written in the style of the book cover and film poster.

An alternative music video for the song, directed by Kazuya Murayama, was filmed in Tokyo and premiered on 29 October 2014.

== Live performances ==
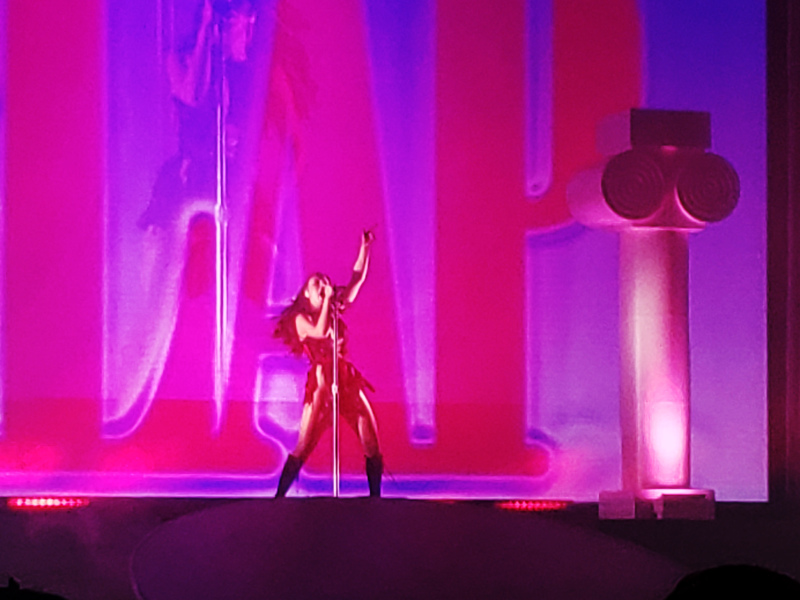
Charli XCX performing "Boom Clap" in 2022

Charli XCX performed the song for the first time on The Fault in Our Stars Live Stream Event on 14 May 2014. She also performed the song at the 2014 MTV Video Music Awards pre-show on 24 August. The song was part of the setlist of Charli XCX's first headlining concert tour, Girl Power North America Tour.

Charli XCX performed the song followed by "Break the Rules" at the 2014 MTV Europe Music Awards. She also performed the song along with "Break the Rules" at the American Music Awards of 2014; when she performed "Boom Clap" she wore a prom dress; after the song she performed her second song, removed her dress with another outfit underneath, and went wild at the show and destroyed parts of her set. She also performed the song on Saturday Night Live.

Charli XCX performed the song in the 1989 World Tour with Taylor Swift in Toronto on 3 October 2015. She also included the song in the setlist of her third solo concert tour, Crash: The Live Tour (2022-2023). She would later perform the song as a surprise track with Chappell Roan at the first Inglewood show of her fifth solo concert tour, the Music, Fashion, Film Tour (2026-2027) in October 2026.

== Track listings ==
Digital download

1. "Boom Clap" – 2:49

Digital download – remixes

1. "Boom Clap" (Aeroplane Remix) – 5:14
2. "Boom Clap" (ASTR Remix) – 3:19
3. "Boom Clap" (Surkin Remix) – 3:40
4. "Boom Clap" (Elk Road Remix) – 3:40
5. "Boom Clap" (Cahill Remix) – 5:28

CD single

1. "Boom Clap" – 2:50
2. "Boom Clap" (Aeroplane Remix) – 5:15

== Charts ==
=== Weekly charts ===
2014 weekly chart performance
Chart (2014)	Peak position
Australia (ARIA)	9
Austria (Ö3 Austria Top 40)	26
Belgium (Ultratop 50 Flanders)	35
Belgium (Ultratop 50 Wallonia)	22
Canada Hot 100 (Billboard)	8
Canada AC (Billboard)	5
Canada CHR/Top 40 (Billboard)	1
Canada Hot AC (Billboard)	3
CIS Airplay (TopHit)	29
Czech Republic Airplay (ČNS IFPI)	1
Czech Republic Singles Digital (ČNS IFPI)	1
Euro Digital Song Sales (Billboard)	7
Finland (Suomen virallinen lista)	15
France (SNEP)	15
Germany (GfK)	36
Hungary (Rádiós Top 40)	25
Hungary (Single Top 40)	34
Ireland (IRMA)	8
Israel (Media Forest TV Airplay)	1
Italy (FIMI)	3
Japan Hot 100 (Billboard)	28
Lebanon (Lebanese Top 20)	17
Mexico (Billboard Ingles Airplay)	1
Mexico Anglo (Monitor Latino)	5
Netherlands (Dutch Top 40)	16
Netherlands (Single Top 100)	28
New Zealand (Recorded Music NZ)	7
Romania (Airplay 100)	73
Russia Airplay (TopHit)	24
Scottish Singles Sales (Official Charts)	3
Slovakia Singles Digital (ČNS IFPI)	10
South Africa Airplay (EMA)	6
Sweden (Sverigetopplistan)	14
Switzerland (Schweizer Hitparade)	33
UK Singles (Official Charts)	6
US Billboard Hot 100	8
US Adult Contemporary (Billboard)	12
US Adult Pop Airplay (Billboard)	3
US Dance Airplay (Billboard)	1
US Pop Airplay (Billboard)	1
US Rhythmic Airplay (Billboard)	17

2026 weekly chart performance
Chart (2026)	Peak position
Venezuela Airplay (Record Report)	99

=== Year-end charts ===
Chart (2014)	Position
Australia (ARIA)	67
Canada (Canadian Hot 100)	37
France (SNEP)	131
Italy (FIMI)	46
Netherlands (Dutch Top 40)	72
Netherlands (Single Top 100)	90
Russia (Tophit)	46
UK Singles (Official Charts Company)	62
US Billboard Hot 100	34
US Adult Top 40 (Billboard)	24
US Dance/Mix Show Airplay (Billboard)	26
US Mainstream Top 40 (Billboard)	16

Chart (2015)	Position
CIS (Tophit)	53
Russia Airplay (Tophit)	51

== Certifications ==
Region	Certification	Certified units/sales
Australia (ARIA)	2× Platinum	140,000^{^}
Canada (Music Canada)	3× Platinum	240,000^{‡}
Germany (BVMI)	Gold	200,000^{‡}
Italy (FIMI)	Platinum	30,000^{‡}
New Zealand (RMNZ)	Platinum	15,000^{*}
Sweden (GLF)	Platinum	40,000^{‡}
United Kingdom (BPI)	Platinum	600,000^{‡}
United States (RIAA)	3× Platinum	3,000,000^{‡}
Streaming
Denmark (IFPI Danmark)	Gold	1,300,000^{†}
^{*} Sales figures based on certification alone.^{^} Shipments figures based on certification alone.^{‡} Sales+streaming figures based on certification alone.^{†} Streaming-only figures based on certification alone.

== Release history ==
Country	Date	Format	Record label
United States	17 June 2014	Contemporary hit radio	Atlantic Records
United States	17 June 2014	Digital download, streaming, vinyl	Neon Gold Records
Ireland	18 July 2014	Digital download	Asylum Records
Italy	18 July 2014	Contemporary hit radio	Warner
United Kingdom	15 July 2014	Digital download	Asylum Records
Germany	15 August 2014	CD single	Warner

== See also ==
- List of Billboard Hot 100 top-ten singles in 2014
- List of Billboard Mainstream Top 40 number-one songs of 2014
