= Doing It (Charli XCX song) =

2015 single by Charli XCX featuring Rita Ora

Single by Charli XCX featuring Rita Ora

from the album Sucker
- Released: 3 February 2015
- Recorded: 2014
- Studio: Sarm West Coast (London, England)
- Genre: Synth-pop; dance-pop
- Length: 3:48
- Label: Asylum; Atlantic
- Songwriters: Charlotte Aitchison; Ariel Rechtshaid; Jarrad Rogers; Jonnali Parmenius; Matthew Burns
- Producers: Ariel Rechtshaid; Mr Rogers

Charli XCX singles chronology
"Break the Rules" (2014)	"Doing It" (2015)	"Drop That Kitty" (2015)

Rita Ora singles chronology
"Black Widow" (2014)	"Doing It" (2015)	"New York Raining" (2015)

Music video
- "Doing It" on YouTube

"Doing It" is a song by British singer Charli XCX from her second studio album, Sucker (2014). An alternative version of the song featuring British singer Rita Ora was released on 3 February 2015 as the album's third single. The single peaked at number eight on the UK Singles Chart. "Doing It" was named "Best New Track" the week of its release by Pitchfork.

Charli XCX performed a snippet of the song in a commercial for Pepsi's "Out of the Blue" music campaign, which aired during the 57th Annual Grammy Awards, on 8 February 2015. Ahead of the release of her 2022 album Crash, Consequence of Sound ranked "Doing It" as Charli XCX's fourth best song.

== Release ==
On 7 January 2015, it was announced the European version of XCX's second studio album would be delayed, to allow for the release of a remix of "Doing It" featuring Rita Ora. A. G. Cook of PC Music contributed an official remix. This was her first collaboration with the English producer, who would later go on to be her creative producer for future projects.

== Music video ==
The music video for "Doing It" was directed by Adam Powell and premiered on 20 January 2015. It was filmed in the Californian desert and takes inspiration from Thelma & Louise (1991), Natural Born Killers (1994), Barbie, Florida strip clubs, 1970s fashion and the work of David LaChapelle.

The video depicts Charli XCX and Ora arriving at a gas station and stealing several items before the gas station cashier could stop them. They then leave the gas station with the stolen items and get chased by the police. Eventually, they escape and stop at a payphone. Later, they are found at a party where the police find them. These scenes are intercut with Charli XCX and Ora singing into microphones with lights surrounding them. Charli XCX dances with a geriatric man in a thong by a pool and the town residents do a dance number with a young girl who enjoys smashing her toy cars.

== Live performances ==
Charli XCX performed "Doing It" for the first time on Jimmy Kimmel Live! on 3 February 2015. On 10 February 2015, she performed the song on BBC Radio 1's Live Lounge, along with a cover of Taylor Swift's "Shake It Off".

Charli XCX performed the song with Ora on The Graham Norton Show on 13 February 2015. The following evening, Charli XCX performed it on The National Lottery. She also performed the track on Sunday Brunch on 15 February 2015. Charli XCX performed the song with Jack Antonoff on Today on 5 June 2015.

== Commercial performance ==
"Doing It" debuted at number eight on the UK Singles Chart with 34,810 copies sold in its first week, becoming Charli XCX's fourth UK top 10 entry and Ora's seventh.

== Track listings ==
- Digital download
1. "Doing It" – 3:48
- Digital download
1. "Doing It" – 3:48
2. "Doing It" (Manhattan Clique Remix) – 3:38
- Digital download – Remixes
1. "Doing It" (A. G. Cook Remix) – 4:00
2. "Doing It" (Westfunk Remix) – 3:23

== Charts ==
Chart performance for "Doing It"
Chart (2015)	Peak position
Australia (ARIA)	68
Belgium (Ultratip Bubbling Under Flanders)	60
Belgium (Ultratip Bubbling Under Wallonia)	23
CIS Airplay (TopHit)	173
Czech Republic Airplay (ČNS IFPI)	62
Euro Digital Song Sales (Billboard)	11
France (SNEP)	165
Ireland (IRMA)	23
Israel (Media Forest TV Airplay)	1
Scottish Singles Sales (Official Charts)	7
Slovakia Singles Digital (ČNS IFPI)	34
UK Singles (Official Charts)	8

== Certifications ==
Certifications for "Doing It"
Region	Certification	Certified units/sales
United Kingdom (BPI)	Silver	200,000^{‡}
^{‡} Sales+streaming figures based on certification alone.

== Release history ==
Release dates and formats for "Doing It"
Region	Date	Format	Label	Ref.
United States	3 February 2015	Contemporary hit radio	Atlantic; RRP	
Ireland	6 February 2015	Digital download	Asylum; Atlantic	
United Kingdom	8 February 2015	Digital download	Asylum; Atlantic	
