= Break the Rules (Charli XCX song) =

Single by Charli XCX

from the album Sucker
- Released: 19 August 2014
- Recorded: 2013–2014
- Studio: Rokstone Studios (London, England); Westlake Recording Studios (Los Angeles, CA)
- Genre: Pop punk; electro-rock; alternative rock
- Length: 3:24
- Label: Atlantic; Asylum; Neon Gold
- Songwriters: Charlotte Aitchison; Steve Mac; Tor E. Hermansen; Mikkel S. Eriksen; Dan Omelio; Magnus August Høiberg
- Producers: Steve Mac; Stargate; Cashmere Cat

Charli XCX singles chronology
"Boom Clap" (2014)	"Break the Rules" (2014)	"Doing It" (2015)

Music video
- "Break the Rules" on YouTube

"Break the Rules" is a song by British singer Charli XCX from her second studio album, Sucker (2014). It was released on 19 August 2014 as the album's second single. In a 2020 interview with Red Bull, Charli XCX stated that she regrets recording the track.

== Background ==
After reaching mainstream success in 2013 with her feature on Icona Pop's song "I Love It", Charli XCX had been frustrated the music industry and went to Sweden to go record new material, distancing herself from her label. Over the course of a month, said material became a punk-inspired album. Mainly working with Patrik Berger, she reflected in an interview with Spin the process was "not thought-about, everything really spontaneous [...] We don't think – it's like the first thing that comes out of my mouth is the cut on the record." The material was eventually scrapped to be more "pop-oriented".

Inspired by the sessions, she wrote "Break The Rules" while at a writing camp to give songs to artists, alongside fellow musicians Benny Blanco and Stargate. While originally intending to give it to another artist, recollecting in later interviews that she thought "whoever sings this song is an idiot.", Charli XCX then realized she was responsible for recording the track. According to Charli XCX, the song is "about not giving a fuck."

== Composition ==
"Break the Rules" (2014)
A 20-second sample of "Break the Rules", an electronic rock song.

"Break the Rules" is a pop-punk, electro-rock, and alternative rock song, set against a "propulsive" synth-pop groove. The song is written in the key of E♭ major in common time with a tempo of 124 beats per minute. "Break the Rules" follows a chord progression of C5–B♭5–A♭5–E♭5–F5, and Charli XCX's vocals span from B♭_{3} to C_{5}.

== Critical reception ==
Michael Nelson of Stereogum described it as "one of the best" of Charli XCX's songs, in which he positively compared it to Joan Jett and Skrillex. Cosmopolitan listed "Break the Rules" at number five on its 2014 best songs list. Ahead of the release of her 2022 album Crash, Consequence of Sound ranked the song as Charli XCX's best, which she disagreed with.

== Music video ==
The music video for "Break the Rules" was directed by Marc Klasfeld and premiered on 25 August 2014. The video was filmed at Birmingham High School while class was in session, so the lyrics "getting high and getting wrecked" had to be muted during playbacks. According to Charli XCX, the video draws inspiration from films such as Carrie (1976), The Craft (1996) and Jawbreaker (1999). It features a cameo from actress Rose McGowan, the star of Jawbreaker, as a school chaperone.

== Usage in media ==
The song was used in trailers for the 2015 film Goosebumps. It was also featured in the 2016 film Good Kids. The song was also used in a 2016 Dish Network commercial and as the theme song of season 7 of Vietnam's Next Top Model. It is also used in both trailers for the 2020 film My Spy. Also, the song was used in a season 1 episode of Quantico, titled "Kill".

== Track listings ==
- Digital download
1. "Break the Rules" – 3:23
- Digital download – Remixes
1. "Break the Rules" (Tiësto Remix) – 4:25
2. "Break the Rules" (Odesza Remix) – 4:00
3. "Break the Rules" (Broods Remix) – 2:52
- German CD single
1. "Break the Rules" – 3:23
2. "Break the Rules" (Tiësto Remix) – 4:25
- Australian CD single – Schoolies Edition
1. "Break the Rules" – 3:23
2. "Break the Rules" (Tiësto Remix) – 4:25
3. "Break the Rules" (ODESZA Remix) – 4:00
4. "Break the Rules" (Broods Remix) – 2:52
5. "Boom Clap" – 2:49

== Credits and personnel ==
Credits for "Break the Rules" are adapted from CD liner notes

Recording locations

- Recorded at Rokstone Studios, London
- Recorded at Westlake Audio, Los Angeles
- Mixed at Hot Rock Studios

Personnel

- Songwriting – Charlotte Aitchison, Dan Omelio, Magnus August Høiberg, Tor Erik Hermansen, Steve Mac
- Mixing – Rob Orton
- Engineering – Chris Laws, Dann Pursey, Tony Lake
- Producing – Cashmere Cat, Stargate, Steve Mac
- Programming – Cashmere Cat
- Bass – Steve Pearce
- Drums – Chris Laws
- Guitar – Dan "Robopop" Omelio
- Keyboards – Steve Mac
- Percussion – Daniel Pursey
- Vocals – Bea Rexstrew, Charli XCX, Katie Littlewood, Kirstin Hume, Macy McCutcheon

== Charts ==
=== Weekly charts ===
Weekly chart performance for "Break the Rules"
Chart (2014–2015)	Peak position
Australia (ARIA)	10
Austria (Ö3 Austria Top 40)	6
Belgium (Ultratop 50 Flanders)	17
Belgium (Ultratop 50 Wallonia)	14
Canada Hot 100 (Billboard)	69
Canada CHR/Top 40 (Billboard)	40
CIS Airplay (TopHit)	119
Czech Republic Airplay (ČNS IFPI)	22
Euro Digital Song Sales (Billboard)	18
France (SNEP)	13
France Airplay (SNEP)	5
Germany (GfK)	4
Ireland (IRMA)	46
Japan Hot 100 (Billboard)	62
New Zealand (Recorded Music NZ)	31
Norway (VG-lista)	34
Poland Dance (ZPAV)	42
Scottish Singles Sales (Official Charts)	15
Switzerland (Schweizer Hitparade)	13
UK Singles (Official Charts)	35
US Billboard Hot 100	91
US Dance Club Songs (Billboard)	36
US Pop Airplay (Billboard)	27

=== Year-end charts ===
Year-end chart performance for "Break the Rules"
Chart (2015)	Position
Austria (Ö3 Austria Top 40)	57
Belgium (Ultratop Flanders)	72
Belgium (Ultratop Wallonia)	65
France (SNEP)	59
Germany (Official German Charts)	65

== Certifications ==
Certifications for "Break the Rules"
Region	Certification	Certified units/sales
Australia (ARIA)	Platinum	70,000^{^}
Canada (Music Canada)	Gold	40,000^{‡}
Germany (BVMI)	Gold	200,000^{‡}
New Zealand (RMNZ)	Gold	7,500^{*}
United Kingdom (BPI)	Silver	200,000^{‡}
United States (RIAA)	Gold	500,000^{‡}
^{*} Sales figures based on certification alone.^{^} Shipments figures based on certification alone.^{‡} Sales+streaming figures based on certification alone.

== Release history ==
Release dates and formats for "Break the Rules"
Region	Date	Format	Label	Ref.
Canada	19 August 2014	Digital download	Atlantic	
United States	19 August 2014	Digital download	Atlantic	
Australia	10 October 2014	Digital download	Atlantic	
Ireland	10 October 2014	Digital download	Asylum; Atlantic	
United Kingdom	12 October 2014	Digital download	Asylum; Atlantic	
Finland	17 October 2014	Digital download	Atlantic	
Norway	17 October 2014	Digital download	Atlantic	
Sweden	17 October 2014	Digital download	Atlantic	
France	27 October 2014	Digital download	Atlantic	
Ireland	31 October 2014	Digital download (remixes)	Asylum; Atlantic	
United Kingdom	2 November 2014	Digital download (remixes)	Asylum; Atlantic	
France	3 November 2014	Digital download (remixes)	Atlantic	
Australia	21 November 2014	CD single; digital download (remixes)	Warner	
United States	24 November 2014	Digital download (remixes)	Atlantic	
Germany	16 January 2015	CD single	Warner	
