= Famous (Charli XCX song) =

Single by Charli XCX

from the album Sucker
- Released: 29 May 2015
- Recorded: 2014
- Studio: Echo Studios (Los Angeles, CA)
- Genre: New wave
- Length: 3:51
- Label: Asylum; Atlantic
- Songwriters: Charlotte Aitchison; Greg Kurstin
- Producer: Greg Kurstin

Charli XCX singles chronology
"Drop That Kitty" (2015)	"Famous" (2015)	"After the Afterparty" (2016)

Music video
- "Famous" on YouTube

"Famous" is a song by British singer Charli XCX, released as the fourth and final single from her second studio album, Sucker (2014). A music video for the single was released on 23 March 2015.

== Release ==
"Famous" was released on 29 May 2015 as the fourth single from Charli XCX's second studio album, Sucker. Remixes were contributed by RIVRS and Brenmar on SoundCloud and digital download.

== Music video ==
The video was first teased on 9 March 2015 on Charli XCX's Twitter, saying, "get ur selfie stick ready @ericwareheim" along with a photo of the upcoming video. A teaser video was released on 20 March 2015 on Charli XCX's YouTube channel. The music video for "Famous" was released for the 2015 YouTube Music Awards three days later, on 23 March 2015. A behind the scenes was released the same day. It was directed by Eric Wareheim.

Caitlyn Carter of Music Times summarises the video, saying, "You really need to watch it to understand". Chris DeVille of Stereogum praises the video and says, "Charli XCX's video for the new wave banger 'Famous' is part of the new slew of clips being released today as part of the YouTube Music Awards, and it's a good one. ... I definitely want to watch it again. The song's great, too, but you already know that if you've been blasting Sucker for the past three months". Pitchfork Media named "Famous" the 19th best music video of 2015.

== Live performances ==
"Famous" was performed at the 2015 MTV Movie Awards, amongst a medley with "Drop That Kitty" joined by Ty Dolla Sign and Tinashe on 12 April 2015. Charli XCX also performed the song on Alan Carr: Chatty Man, as she was featured as the musical guest on 15 May 2015.

== Usage in media ==
- In 2015, "Famous" was featured in the rhythm game Guitar Hero Live.
- It was also used in the German comedy Fack ju Göhte 2Fack ju Göhte 2 which was released in German movie theatres on 10 September 2015.
- The song has been featured in the television show The Flash.
- It was used in the British TV show The Dumping Ground in its fifth season episode, "Faking It", released in 2017.

== Accolades ==
- # 5 - Top 10 best pop video of the year by Time
- # 13 - Top 20 best music videos of the year by Fact
- # 19 - Best music video of the year by Pitchfork Media

== Track listings ==
- Digital download
1. "Famous" — 3:51
- Digital download – Remixes
1. "Famous" — 3:51
2. "Famous" (Brenmar Remix) — 3:34
3. "Famous" (RIVRS Remix) — 4:09

== Charts ==
Chart performance for "Famous"
Chart (2015)	Peak position
Australia (ARIA)	75
CIS Airplay (TopHit)	186
Scottish Singles Sales (Official Charts)	88
UK Singles (OCC)	176

== Release history ==
Release dates and formats for "Famous"
Region	Date	Format	Label	Ref.
United Kingdom	29 May 2015	Digital download	Asylum; Atlantic	
Ireland	29 May 2015	Digital download	Asylum; Atlantic	
