= List of Charli XCX live performances =

Charli XCX live performances
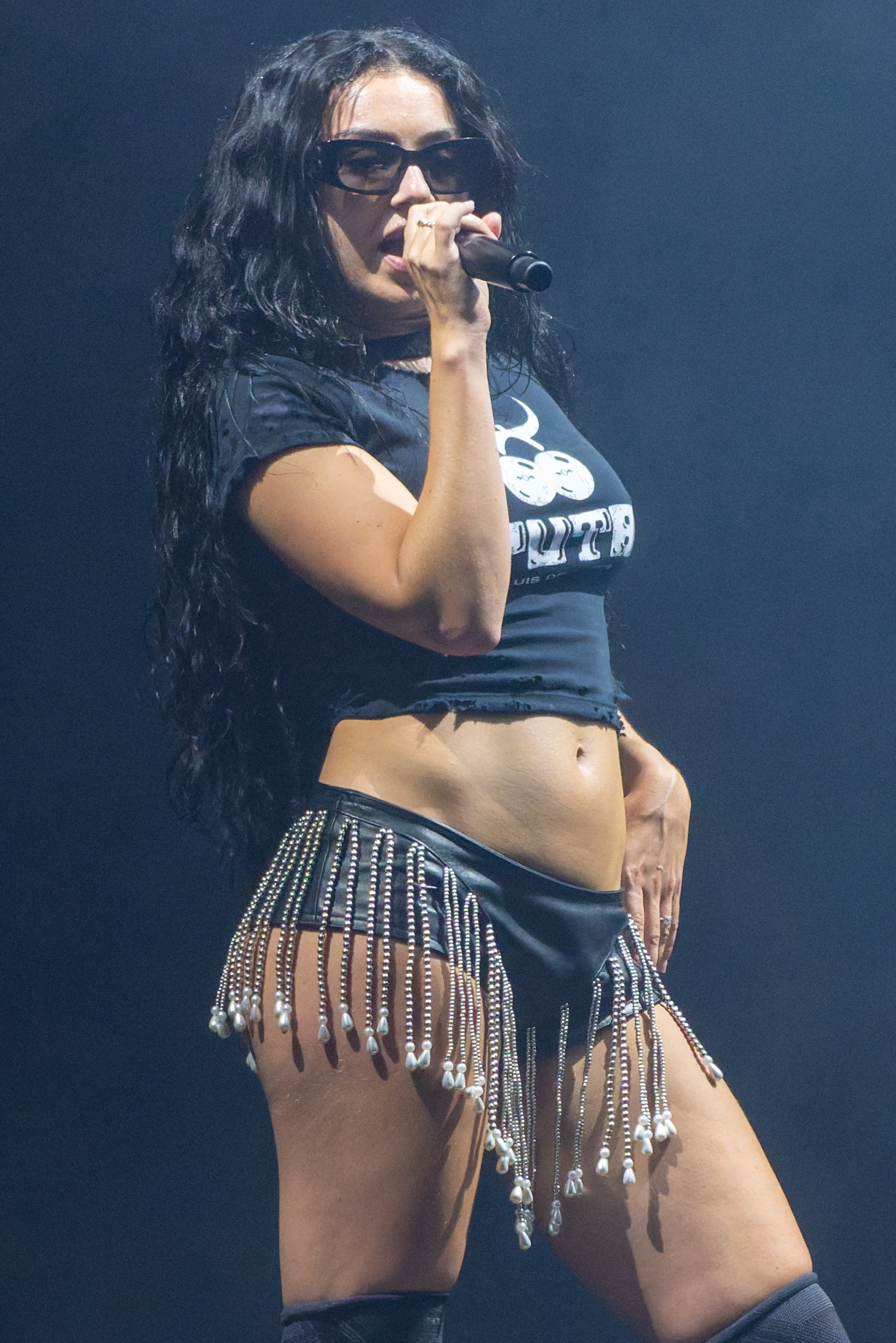
- Charli XCX performing at Primavera Sound 2025 in Barcelona
- Headlining tours: 10
- Supporting tours: 11
- Television performances: 40

British singer Charli XCX has embarked on seven tours as a headlining artist (including one as a co-headlining artist) and 11 tours as a supporting act.

She began her career performing in warehouse raves and parties in her teenage years. Between 2010 and 2013, XCX was a support act for The Ting Tings, Azealia Banks, Coldplay, Marina and the Diamonds, Sleigh Bells, Ellie Goulding, and Paramore. After finding commercial success as a featured artist on Icona Pop's "I Love It" and Iggy Azalea's "Fancy", she increased in popularity as a solo artist with tracks such as "Boom Clap" and "Break the Rules". XCX also released her second studio album, Sucker, in 2014 and embarked on the Girl Power North America Tour to promote it.

In 2015, she and Jack Antonoff toured the US on the Charli and Jack Do America Tour. That same year, she toured alongside Katy Perry on her Prismatic World Tour. Following the release of her mixtapes Number 1 Angel and Pop 2 (both in 2017), XCX lead several brief promotional tours to promote the records. In 2017 she supported Halsey and Sia on their tours. Following a 53-stop tour with Taylor Swift, XCX released her third studio album, Charli (2019), and staged the Charli Live Tour to promote it.

== Headlining tours ==
Title	Dates	Associated album(s)	Continent(s)	Shows	Gross	Attendance	Ref.
Girl Power North America Tour	26 September 2014 – 25 October 2014	Sucker	North America	20			
Girl Power North America Tour Setlist: 1. "Sucker"; 2. "Breaking Up"; 3. "I Love It"; 4. "Famous"; 5. "SuperLove"; 6. "Black Roses"; 7. "Lock You Up" (contains elements of "Nuclear Seasons"); 8. "Caught in the Middle"; 9. "Need Ur Luv"; 10. "Stay Away"; 11. "You (Ha Ha Ha)"; 12. "Money (That's What I Want)" (The Flying Lizards cover); 13. "London Queen"; 14. "Break the Rules"; 15. "Grins"; 16. "Gold Coins"; Encore: 17. "Fancy (GTA Remix)"; 18. "Boom Clap"
Charli and Jack Do America Tour	21 July 2015 – 12 August 2015	Sucker; Strange Desire	North America	13			
Charli and Jack Do America Tour Setlist: 1. "Sucker"; 2. "Breaking Up"; 3. "I Love It"; 4. "Famous"; 5. "SuperLove"; 6. "Doing It"; 7. "Need Ur Luv"; 8. "Allergic To Love"; 9. "Mow That Lawn"; 10. "Body of My Own"; 11. "London Queen"; 12. "Break the Rules"; 13. "Gold Coins"; Encore: 14. "Grins"; 15. "Fancy"; 16. "Boom Clap"
Charli Live Tour	20 September 2019 – 21 October 2020	Charli	North America, Europe, Oceania	50			
Charli Tour Setlist: 1. "Next Level Charli"; 2. "Click"; 3. "I Don't Wanna Know"; 4. "Vroom Vroom"; 5. "Gone"; 6. "Warm"; 7. "Cross You Out"; 8. "February 2017"; 9. "Thoughts"; 10. "White Mercedes"; 11. "Official"; 12. "Shake It"; 13. "I Got It"; 14. "Track 10 / Blame It on Your Love"; 15. "Silver Cross"; 16. "2099"; Encore: 17. "Unlock It"; 18. "I Love It"; 19. "Boys"; 20. "1999"
Crash: The Live Tour	26 March 2022 – 2 March 2023	Crash	North America, Europe, Asia, Latin America, Oceania	69			
Crash Tour Setlist: 1. "Lightning"; 2. "Gone"; 3. "Move Me"; 4. "Constant Repeat"; 5. "Baby"; 6. "Yuck"; 7. "Every Rule"; 8. "Party 4 U"; 9. "Used To Know Me"; 10. "1999"; 11. "Beg for You"; 12. "Crash"; 13. "Boom Clap"; 14. "Boys"; 15. "New Shapes"; 16. "Twice"; Encore: 17. "Vroom Vroom"; 18. "Visions"; 19. "Unlock It"; 20. "Good Ones"
Sweat (co-headlined with Troye Sivan)	14 September 2024 – 23 October 2024/6 June 2025	Brat (Charli XCX); Something to Give Each Other (Troye Sivan)	North America, Europe (Note: Charli and Troye performed a SWEAT Tour branded concert at Primavera Sound Barcelona on 6 June 2025 in Barcelona, Catalonia (Spain))	23			
Sweat Tour Setlist: 1. "Got Me Started (Bag Raiders Remix)"/"Got Me Started" (Troye Sivan); 2. "What's the Time Where You Are?" (Troye Sivan); 3. "My My My!" (Troye Sivan); 4. "365 Remix with Shygirl" (Charli XCX and Shygirl); 5. "360" (Charli XCX); 6. "Von Dutch" (Charli XCX); 7. "In My Room" (Troye Sivan); 8. "Dance to This" (Troye Sivan); 9. "Rager Teenager!" (Troye Sivan); 10. "Club Classics" (Charli XCX); 11. "Unlock It" (Charli XCX); 12. "Sympathy Is a Knife" (Charli XCX); 13. "Guess featuring Billie Eilish" (Charli XCX); 14. "Bloom" (Troye Sivan); 15. "Boys" (Charli XCX); 16. "Girl, So Confusing featuring Lorde" (Charli XCX); 17. "One of Your Girls" (Troye Sivan); 18. "Everything Is Romantic" (Charli XCX); 19. "Speed Drive" (Charli XCX); 20. "Apple" (Charli XCX); 21. "Silly" (Troye Sivan); 22. "You" (Troye Sivan); 23. "Stud" (Troye Sivan); 24. "365" (Charli XCX); 25. "Vroom Vroom" (Charli XCX); 26. "1999" (Charli XCX and Troye Sivan); 27. "Track 10" (Charli XCX); 28. "I Love It" (Charli XCX); 29. "Honey" (Troye Sivan); 30. "Rush" (Troye Sivan); Encore: 31. "Talk Talk featuring Troye Sivan" (Charli XCX and Troye Sivan)
Brat Tour	27 November 2024 – 18 June 2025	Brat	North America, Europe	14			
Brat Tour Setlist: 1. "365 featuring Shygirl"; 2. "360"; 3. "Von Dutch"; 4. "Rewind"; 5. "I Might Say Something Stupid"; 6. "Club Classics"; 7. "Unlock It"; 8. "Talk Talk"; 9. "Apple"; 10. "So I"; 11. "So I featuring A.G. Cook"; 12. "Spring Breakers"; 13. "Girl, So Confusing featuring Lorde"; 14. "Everything Is Romantic"; 15. "Speed Drive"; 16. "Sympathy Is a Knife"; 17. "Guess"; 18. "365"; Encore: 19. "Party 4 U"; 20. "Vroom Vroom"; 21. "Track 10"; 22. "I Love It"

Promotional tours

Title	Dates	Associated album(s)	Continent(s)	Shows	Gross	Attendance	Ref.
Number 1 Angel Tour	2 April 2017 – 22 April 2017	Number 1 Angel	North America, Europe	4			
Number 1 Angel Tour Setlist: 1. "Roll With Me"; 2. "Dreamer"; 3. "Babygirl"; 4. "ILY2"; 5. "Emotional"; 6. "No Angel"; 7. "Vroom Vroom"; 8. "3AM (Pull Up)"; 9. "Blame It On You"; 10. "White Roses"; 11. "Bounce"; 12. "Trophy"; 13. "Drugs"; 14. "Lipgloss"; 15. "Girls Night Out"
Pop 2 Tour	15 March 2018 – 23 October 2018	Pop 2	North America, Europe, Oceania	5			
Pop 2 Tour Setlist: 1. Unlock It; 2. "Lucky"; 3. "Femmebot"; 4. "3AM (Pull Up)"; 5. "Delicious"; 6. "Backseat"; 7. "I Got It"; 8. "Dreamer"; 9. "5 in the Morning"; 10. "Tears"; 11. "Roll With Me"; 12. "Out of My Head"; 13. "Focus"; 14. "Drugs"; 15. "Track 10"; 16. "Boys"; 17. "Vroom Vroom"; 18. "Lipgloss"; 19. "Girls Night Out"
How I'm Feeling Now Tour	27 September 2021 – 24 October 2021	How I'm Feeling Now	North America, Europe	3			
How I'm Feeling Now Tour Setlist: 1. "Visions"; 2. "Detonate"; 3. "7 Years"; 4. "Anthems"; 5. "Claws"; 6. "Enemy"; 7. "Party 4 U"; 8. "Pink Diamond"; 9. "I Finally Understand"; 10. "C2.0"; 11. "Forever"; 12. "Vroom Vroom"; 13. "Good Ones"

== Supporting tours ==
Title	Dates	Artist	Continent(s)	Shows	Gross	Ref.
Show Us Yours Tour	2011	The Ting Tings	Europe			
Terror Tour	2012	Sleigh Bells	North America			
Mermaid Ball	2012	Azealia Banks	North America	1		
Mylo Xyloto Tour	2012	Coldplay	Europe / North America	13	$42,740,908	
The Halcyon Days Tour	2013	Ellie Goulding	Europe			
The Lonely Hearts Club Tour	2013	Marina and the Diamonds	North America			
The Self-Titled Tour	2013	Paramore	Europe	7		
Prismatic World Tour	2015	Katy Perry	Europe	20	$3,518,983	
Hopeless Fountain Kingdom Tour	2017	Halsey	North America	26	$7,328,715	
Nostalgic for the Present Tour	2017	Sia	Oceania	3	$5,531,210	
Reputation Stadium Tour	2018	Taylor Swift	North America, Europe, Oceania, Asia	53	$345,700,000	
Totals
				123	$404,819,816	

== Television performances ==
Date	Program	Country	Songs	Notes
13 June 2013	JBTV	United States	"You (Ha Ha Ha)" · "Grins" · "Take My Hand" · "You're the One" · "Lock You Up" · "What I Like"	
17 March 2014	Late Night with Seth Meyers	United States	"Fancy" (with Iggy Azalea)	
22 April 2014	Good Morning America	United States	"Fancy" (with Iggy Azalea)	
15 May 2014	Jimmy Kimmel Live!	United States	"Fancy" (with Iggy Azalea)	
18 May 2014	2014 Billboard Music Awards	United States	"Fancy" (with Iggy Azalea)	
20 May 2014	Dancing with the Stars	United States	"Fancy" (with Iggy Azalea)	
7 July 2014	Late Night with Seth Meyers	United States	"Boom Clap"	
8 July 2014	Today	United States	"Boom Clap"	
24 August 2014	2014 MTV Video Music Awards	United States	"Boom Clap"	Pre-show
29 August 2014	4Music	England	"Boom Clap"	
6 November 2014	X Factor Italy	Italy	"Boom Clap"	
9 November 2014	2014 MTV Europe Music Awards	Scotland	"Boom Clap" · "Break the Rules"	
23 November 2014	American Music Awards of 2014	United States	"Boom Clap" · "Break the Rules" · "Fancy" · "Beg For It" (with Iggy Azalea)	
13 December 2014	Saturday Night Live	United States	"Boom Clap" · "Break the Rules"	
16 December 2014	Late Show with David Letterman	United States	"Need Ur Luv"	
17 December 2014	Today	United States	"Break the Rules"	
31 December 2014	Top of the Pops	England	"Boom Clap"	
3 February 2015	Jimmy Kimmel Live!	United States	"Doing It"	
11 February 2015	Le Grand Journal	France	"Boom Clap"	
13 February 2015	The Graham Norton Show	England	"Doing It"	
14 February 2015	The National Lottery	England	"Doing It"	
15 February 2015	Sunday Brunch	England	"Doing It"	
17 March 2015	C à vous	France	"Break the Rules"	
12 April 2015	2015 MTV Movie Awards	United States	"Famous" · "Drop That Kitty" (with Ty Dolla Sign and Tinashe)	
15 May 2015	Alan Carr: Chatty Man	England	"Famous"	
22 May 2015	Le Grand Journal	France	"Doing It" · "Famous" · "Break the Rules"	
5 June 2015	Today	United States	"Doing It" · "Boom Clap"	
21 November 2016	The X Factor Australia	Australia	"After the Afterparty"	
25 November 2016	Sunrise	Australia	"After the Afterparty"	
7 February 2017	Jimmy Kimmel Live!	United States	"After the Afterparty" · "Bounce"	
10 September 2017	Sunday Brunch	England	"Boys"	
28 September 2017	The Tonight Show Starring Jimmy Fallon	United States	"Boys"	
12 November 2017	2017 MTV Europe Music Awards	England	"Dirty Sexy Money" (with David Guetta and French Montana)	
22 October 2018	Sunrise	Australia	"1999"	
12 November 2018	The Tonight Show Starring Jimmy Fallon	United States	"1999" (Performed with Troye Sivan)	
14 September 2019	The Jonathan Ross Show	England	"Gone" (with Christine and the Queens)	
16 September 2019	The Tonight Show Starring Jimmy Fallon	United States	"Gone" (with Christine and the Queens)	
6 October 2021	The Tonight Show Starring Jimmy Fallon	United States	"Good Ones"	
5 March 2022	Saturday Night Live	United States	"Beg for You" · "Baby"	
16 November 2024	Saturday Night Live	United States	"360" · "Sympathy is a Knife"	

== Web performances ==
Program	Year	Songs	Notes
Perez Hilton TV	2013	"SuperLove"	
BBC Radio 1 Live Lounge	10 February 2015	"Doing It" · "Shake It Off" (Note: Taylor Swift cover)	
BBC Radio 1 Live Lounge	11 May 2017	"1 Night" (with Mura Masa)	
Like a Version	8 December 2017	"Boys" · "Don't Delete the Kisses"	
BBC Radio 1 Live Lounge	5 September 2019	"Gone" (with Christine and The Queens) · "TooTimeTooTimeTooTime" (Note: The 1975 cover)	
Grubhub Sound Bites	25 November 2020	"Forever" · "Claws" · "Gone" · "Enemy" · "Cross You Out" · "Boys" · "C2.0" · "Party 4 U" · "Detonate" · "Unlock It" · "1999" · "Boom Clap"	

== Other live performances ==
Date	Event	City	Performed song(s)	Notes
16 February 2019	Z104.3 Bitter Ball	Baltimore, Maryland	"Boom Clap" · "I Love It" · "Break the Rules" · "1999" · "Dirty Sexy Money" · "Boys" · "5 in the Morning" · "Fancy"	
15 & 22 April 2023	Coachella	Indio, California	"Lightning" · "Gone" · "Constant Repeat" · "I Love It" · "Baby" · "Beg for You" · "1999" (with Troye Sivan) (Note: Only on 15 April performance)· "Welcome to My Island (George Daniel & Charli XCX Remix)" · "Boys" · "Track 10" · "Vroom Vroom" · "Unlock It" · "Good Ones"	
22 February 2024	Boiler Room & Charli XCX Presents PARTYGIRL	Brooklyn, New York		
12 July 2024	Boiler Room & Charli XCX Presents PARTYGIRL	Ibiza, Spain		
