= Charli Live Tour =

2019–20 concert tour by Charli XCX

- Tour by Charli XCX
- Associated album: Charli
- Start date: 20 September 2019
- End date: 21 October 2020
- Legs: 4
- No. of shows: 23 in North America; 20 in Europe; 6 in Oceania; 1 in Latin America; 50 total

Charli XCX concert chronology
- Charli and Jack Do America Tour (2015); Charli Live Tour (2019–2020); Crash: The Live Tour (2022-2023)

The Charli Live Tour was the second solo concert tour by British singer Charli XCX, in support of her third studio album Charli (2019). The tour was announced alongside the album's official reveal on 13 June 2019. The tour started on 20 September 2019 in Atlanta, United States and concluded on 21 October 2020 in Mexico City, Mexico.

== Set list ==
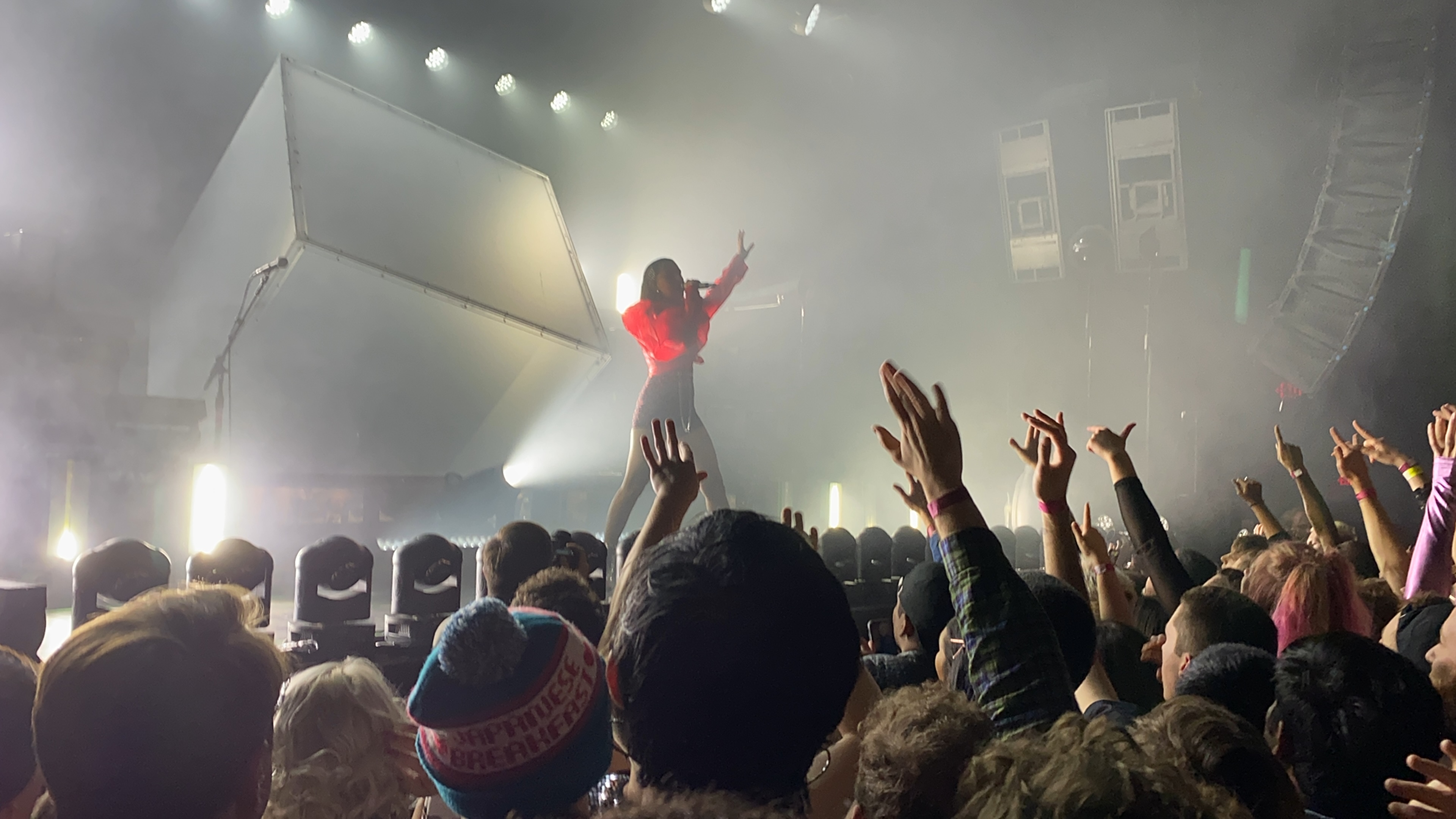
Performance at First Avenue, Minneapolis

1. "Next Level Charli"
2. "Click"
3. "I Don't Wanna Know"
4. "Vroom Vroom"
5. "Gone"
6. "Warm"
7. "Cross You Out"
8. "February 2017"
9. "Thoughts"
10. "White Mercedes"
11. "Official"
12. "Shake It"
13. "I Got It"
14. "Track 10" / "Blame It on Your Love"
15. "Silver Cross"
16. "2099"

Encore

17. "Unlock It"
18. "I Love It"
19. "Boys"
20. "1999"

== Tour dates ==
Date	City	Country	Venue	Opening acts	Attendance	Revenue
North America
20 September 2019	Atlanta	United States	Buckhead Theatre	Tommy Genesis	—N/a	—N/a
21 September 2019	Nashville	United States	Marathon Music Works	Tommy Genesis	—N/a	—N/a
23 September 2019	Houston	United States	White Oak Music Hall	Tommy Genesis	756 / 1,400	$26,450
24 September 2019	Austin	United States	Emo's	Tommy Genesis	1,550 / 1,550	$41,889
25 September 2019	Dallas	United States	House of Blues Dallas	Tommy Genesis	—N/a	—N/a
27 September 2019	Tempe	United States	The Marquee	Brooke Candy; Dorian Electra	—N/a	—N/a
28 September 2019	San Diego	United States	House of Blues San Diego	Brooke Candy	—N/a	—N/a
1 October 2019	Los Angeles	United States	The Wiltern	Brooke Candy	—N/a	—N/a
2 October 2019	Oakland	United States	Fox Oakland Theatre	Brooke Candy	2,461 / 2,829	$86,220
4 October 2019	Seattle	United States	The Showbox	Brooke Candy	—N/a	—N/a
5 October 2019	Vancouver	Canada	Commodore Ballroom	Brooke Candy	—N/a	—N/a
6 October 2019	Portland	United States	Roseland Theater	Brooke Candy	—N/a	—N/a
8 October 2019	Salt Lake City	United States	Union Event Center	Dorian Electra	—N/a	—N/a
9 October 2019	Denver	United States	Ogden Theatre	Dorian Electra	—N/a	—N/a
11 October 2019	Minneapolis	United States	First Avenue	Dorian Electra	—N/a	—N/a
12 October 2019	Chicago	United States	House of Blues Chicago	Allie X	—N/a	—N/a
14 October 2019	Toronto	Canada	Rebel	Slayyyter	—N/a	—N/a
15 October 2019	Montreal	Canada	Corona Theatre	Allie X	912 / 912	$24,182
17 October 2019	Boston	United States	House of Blues Boston	Allie X	2,336 / 2,408	$77,023
18 October 2019	Washington, D.C.	United States	9:30 Club	Slayyyter	1,200 / 1,200	$36,000
19 October 2019	Philadelphia	United States	Union Transfer	Dorian Electra	—N/a	—N/a
21 October 2019	New York City	United States	Terminal 5	Brooke Candy	—N/a	—N/a
22 October 2019	New York City	United States	Terminal 5	Allie X	—N/a	—N/a
Europe
27 October 2019	Glasgow	Scotland	SWG3 Galvanisers	Rina Sawayama	1,300 / 1,300	$31,974
28 October 2019	Birmingham	England	O_{2} Institute Birmingham	Rina Sawayama	—N/a	—N/a
30 October 2019	Manchester	England	Albert Hall	Rina Sawayama	—N/a	—N/a
31 October 2019	London	England	O_{2} Brixton Academy	Brooke Candy; Rina Sawayama	—N/a	—N/a
2 November 2019 (Note: This show is part of Pitchfork Music Festival Paris.)	Paris	France	Grande halle de la Villette	—N/a	—N/a	—N/a
4 November 2019	Stockholm	Sweden	Berns	Dorian Electra	—N/a	—N/a
5 November 2019	Oslo	Norway	John Dee	Dorian Electra	—N/a	—N/a
7 November 2019	Copenhagen	Denmark	Vega	Dorian Electra	—N/a	—N/a
9 November 2019	Berlin	Germany	Astra Kulturhaus	Dorian Electra	—N/a	—N/a
10 November 2019	Hamburg	Germany	Fabrik	Dorian Electra	—N/a	—N/a
12 November 2019	Warsaw	Poland	Klub Stodoła	Dorian Electra	—N/a	—N/a
14 November 2019	Prague	Czech Republic	Roxy	Dorian Electra	—N/a	—N/a
15 November 2019	Cologne	Germany	Carlswerk Victoria	Dorian Electra	—N/a	—N/a
17 November 2019	Lyon	France	Le Transbordeur	Dorian Electra	—N/a	—N/a
18 November 2019	Milan	Italy	Fabrique	Dorian Electra	—N/a	—N/a
20 November 2019	Madrid	Spain	Sala La Riviera	Danny L Harle	—N/a	—N/a
22 November 2019	Barcelona	Spain	Razzmatazz Room 2	Danny L Harle	—N/a	—N/a
25 November 2019	Amsterdam	Netherlands	Paradiso	Dorian Electra	—N/a	—N/a
26 November 2019	Brussels	Belgium	Ancienne Belgique	Dorian Electra	1,660 / 1,908	$40,777
28 November 2019	Moscow	Russia	Izvestia Hall	Dorian Electra	—N/a	—N/a
Oceania
27 January 2020 (Note: These dates are part of St. Jerome's Laneway Festival.)	Auckland	New Zealand	Albert Park	—N/a	—N/a	—N/a
1 February 2020	Brisbane	Australia	Brisbane Showgrounds	—N/a	—N/a	—N/a
2 February 2020	Sydney	Australia	The Domain	—N/a	—N/a	—N/a
7 February 2020	Adelaide	Australia	Hart's Mill	—N/a	—N/a	—N/a
8 February 2020	Melbourne	Australia	Footscray Park	—N/a	—N/a	—N/a
9 February 2020	Fremantle	Australia	Esplanade Park	—N/a	—N/a	—N/a
Latin America
21 October 2020 (Note: This show was originally scheduled on March 24, 2020, but was rescheduled due to coronavirus pandemic.)	Mexico City	Mexico	El Plaza Condesa	—N/a	—N/a	—N/a
Total					12,175 / 13,507 (90%)	$364,515

== Cancelled shows ==
Date	City	Country	Venue	Reason
November 24, 2019	Luxembourg		Den Atelier	Logistical reasons
March 20, 2020 (Note: This show is part of BUKU Music + Art Project.)	New Orleans	United States	Mardi Gras World	COVID-19 pandemic
March 28, 2020 (Note: This show is part of Lollapalooza Argentina.)	Buenos Aires	Argentina	Hipódromo de San Isidro	COVID-19 pandemic
March 29, 2020 (Note: This show is part of Lollapalooza Chile.)	Santiago	Chile	Parque O'Higgins	COVID-19 pandemic
April 3, 2020 (Note: This show is part of Estéreo Picnic Festival.)	Bogotá	Colombia	Campo de Golf Briceño 18	COVID-19 pandemic
April 5, 2020 (Note: This show is part of Lollapalooza Brasil.)	São Paulo	Brazil	Autódromo de Interlagos	COVID-19 pandemic
April 10, 2020 (Note: These dates are part of Coachella.)	Indio	United States	Empire Polo Club	COVID-19 pandemic
April 17, 2020	Indio	United States	Empire Polo Club	COVID-19 pandemic
June 13, 2020 (Note: This show is part of Parklife Festival.)	Manchester	England	Heaton Park	COVID-19 pandemic
June 14, 2020 (Note: This show is part of Lovebox Festival.)	London	England	Gunnersbury Park	COVID-19 pandemic
June 25, 2020 (Note: This show is part of Provinssirock.)	Seinäjoki	Finland	Törnävänsaari	COVID-19 pandemic
June 26, 2020 (Note: This show is part of Glastonbury Festival.)	Pilton	England	Worthy Farm	COVID-19 pandemic
July 1, 2020 (Note: This show is part of Open'er Festival.)	Gdynia	Poland	Gdynia-Kosakowo Airport	COVID-19 pandemic
July 2, 2020 (Note: This show is part of Roskilde Festival.)	Roskilde	Denmark	Festivalpladsen	COVID-19 pandemic
July 3, 2020 (Note: This show is part of Down the Rabbit Hole.)	Beuningen	Netherlands	De Groene Heuvels	COVID-19 pandemic
July 5, 2020 (Note: This show is part of Longitude Festival.)	Dublin	Ireland	Marlay Park	COVID-19 pandemic
July 8, 2020 (Note: This show is part of NOS Alive.)	Oeiras	Portugal	Passeio Marítimo de Algés	COVID-19 pandemic
July 9, 2020 (Note: This show is part of Mad Cool.)	Madrid	Spain	Espacio Mad Cool	COVID-19 pandemic
July 11, 2020	London	England	Finsbury Park	COVID-19 pandemic
July 18, 2020 (Note: This show is part of Latitude Festival.)	Southwold	England	Henham Park	COVID-19 pandemic
July 19, 2020 (Note: This show is part of Melt! Festival.)	Gräfenhainichen	Germany	Ferropolis	COVID-19 pandemic
August 2, 2020 (Note: This show is part of Osheaga Festival.)	Montreal	Canada	Parc Jean-Drapeau	COVID-19 pandemic
