= 5 in the Morning =

2018 single by Charli XCX

Single by Charli XCX
- Released: 31 May 2018
- Length: 2:49
- Label: Asylum; Atlantic UK
- Songwriters: Charlotte Aitchison; Jeff Young; Jason Pebworth; George Astasio; Jonathan Shave; Nat Dunn; Cleo Tighe
- Producer: The Invisible Men

Charli XCX singles chronology
"Girls" (2018)	"5 in the Morning" (2018)	"Bitches" (2018)

Music video
- "5 in the Morning" on YouTube

"5 in the Morning" is a single by British singer Charli XCX. It was released on 31 May 2018 by Asylum Records and Atlantic Records UK as the first installment from a series of monthly single releases.

== Critical reception ==
Olivia Horn of Pitchfork labeled the song as fitting "comfortably within the worldview that Charli outlined on Pop 2", and named it a "victory lap since last year's Pop 2 mixtape". Alex Kazemi of Paper labeled the song as a "goth-infused afterparty aligned with the harsh emotion behind her new-wave debut album True Romance".

== Music video ==
The music video for "5 in the Morning" was released on 27 June 2018. The video was directed by Bradley & Pablo, who previously shot her "Vroom Vroom" music video, and features Charli XCX strutting around an empty warehouse surrounded by club lights.

== Live performances ==
Throughout her opening shows on Taylor Swift's Reputation Stadium Tour, Charli XCX performed the song in every setlist. Charli XCX also performed a live Fader session of the song uploaded in July 2018.

== Charts ==
Chart (2018)	Peak position
New Zealand Heatseekers (RMNZ)	7
