= Lanre Gaba =

American music executive

- Born: Nigeria
- Occupation: Music executive
- Employer: Atlantic Music Group (Warner Music Group)
- Title: President of Hip-Hop, R&B and Global Music at Atlantic Music Group

Lanre Gaba is a Nigerian–American music executive. She is the President of Hip-Hop, R&B, and Global Music at Atlantic Music Group, a division of Warner Music Group.

== Early life and education ==
Gaba was born in Nigeria and moved to New Jersey at a young age. Her mother, Barbara Gaba, is an American academic who became the first woman and first Black president of Atlantic Cape Community College in New Jersey. She studied journalism at Syracuse University.

== Career ==
Gaba began her career with roles at Ruffhouse Records and EMI Music Publishing before joining Atlantic Records, where she started in the A&R department. She advanced through a series of leadership positions including Vice President of A&R Operations, Senior Vice President of Urban A&R, and Executive Vice President of Black Music A&R.

She was recognized by the Recording Industry Association of America as Executive of the Year and has held senior leadership roles at Atlantic culminating in her appointment as President of Hip-Hop, R&B, and Global Music at Atlantic Music Group.

== Recognition ==
Gaba has been profiled in major music industry publications including XXL, Billboard, Music Business Worldwide, and Variety.

- XXL featured her in a career interview covering her work with artists including Gucci Mane and Cardi B.
- Music Business Worldwide highlighted her in its "Inspiring Women" series, focusing on her leadership role at Atlantic and highlighted her work with Cardi B, Roddy Rich, Lil Uzi Vert, Gucci Mane, Burna Boy, Kodak Black, A Boogie Wit Da Hoodie, Youngboy Never Broke Again, FKA Twigs.
- Billboard has repeatedly recognized her:
  - Named RIAA's Executive of the Year.
  - Selected as Executive of the Week for her work with Cardi B and Pooh Shiesty.
  - Included her in its Change Agents list.
  - Listed her for multiple years in its annual R&B/Hip-Hop Power Players ranking, most recently in 2025.
- Variety has featured her in several pieces, including:
  - Coverage of her promotion to Co-President of Black Music.
  - Recognition as one of the leading women A&R executives at major labels.
  - A feature on Atlantic's Generation Now label and the rise of artists like Jack Harlow and Lil Uzi Vert.
  - Inclusion in its annual Hitmakers list.
  - Recognition in the Power of Women in Music feature highlighting executives and creatives shaping the industry.
  - Listing among the New Power Players in Music, which credited her role in Issa Rae's label ventures.
