= Focus / No Angel =

"Focus" / "No Angel"

Single by Charli XCX
- Released: 29 June 2018
- Genre: Synth-pop; hip hop
- Length: 3:22 ("Focus"); 3:06 ("No Angel")
- Label: Asylum; Atlantic UK
- Songwriters: Charlotte Aitchison; Alexander Guy Cook; Jack & Coke
- Producers: A. G. Cook; Jack & Coke; Saltwives; The Invisible Men; Sophie

Charli XCX singles chronology
"Bitches" (2018)	"Focus" / "No Angel" (2018)	"Girls Night Out" (2018)

"Focus" and "No Angel" are songs recorded by British singer Charli XCX. They were released as a double single on 28 June 2018 by Asylum Records and Atlantic Records UK as the second installment from a series of monthly single releases. Both of the songs were performed live prior to their release.

== Composition ==
"Focus" is a "synth-driven, half-rapped" "hip hop" track which features the singer giving a demand for attention. Lake Schatz of Consequence of Sound compared the song to Charli XCX's 2016 extended play Vroom Vroom. "No Angel" is a bouncy synth-pop anthem. It sees the singer admitting to having a wild side and wanting to prove herself worthy of love.

== Critical reception ==
Julia Gray of Stereogum named "Focus" a "synth-driven, half-rapped track" and named "No Angel" a "bouncy, shimmering anthem". "No Angel" was named "Best New Track" by Pitchfork, describing the song as "effervescent 80s synth pop". Brittany Spanos of Rolling Stone called "Focus" an "unrepentant earworm, with that trademark XCX style of delivering an almost cruelly addictive, simple chorus." She wrote that "No Angel" "has the effortless cool that makes so many of her songs sound fresh and unmistakably her own."

== Track listing ==
Credits adapted from Qobuz.

Focus / No Angel
No.	Title	Writer(s)	Producer(s)	Length
1.	"Focus"	Charlotte Aitchison; Alexander Guy Cook; Jack & Coke	A. G. Cook; Jack & Coke	3:22
2.	"No Angel"	Charlotte Aitchison; George Astasio; Jason Pebworth; Jon Shave; Alexander Oriet; David Phelan	Saltwives; The Invisible Men; SOPHIE^{[a]}	3:06
Total length:				6:28

Focus (Yaeji Remix)
No.	Title	Writer(s)	Producer(s)	Length
1.	"Focus" (Yaeji Remix)	Aitchison; Cook; Jack & Coke	Cook; Jack & Coke	3:17
Total length:				3:17

Notes

- ^{^[a]} signifies an additional producer

== Charts ==
Chart performance for "Focus"
Chart (2018)	Peak position
New Zealand Hot Singles (RMNZ)	32
