= Flash Pose =

2019 song by Pabllo Vittar and Charli XCX

Single by Pabllo Vittar featuring Charli XCX

from the EP 111 1 and the album 111
- Released: 25 July 2019
- Genre: Electropop
- Length: 2:32
- Label: Sony Music Brazil
- Songwriters: Aluna Francis; Arthur Marques; Charlotte Aitchison; Maffalda; Pablo Bispo; Rodrigo Gorky; Zebu
- Producer: Brabo Music Team

Pabllo Vittar singles chronology
"Garupa" (2019)	"Flash Pose" (2019)	"Parabéns" (2019)

Charli XCX singles chronology
"Gone" (2019)	"Flash Pose" (2019)	"Click (No Boys Remix)" (2019)

Music video
- "Flash Pose" on YouTube

"Flash Pose" is a song by Brazilian singer and drag queen Pabllo Vittar featuring British singer Charli XCX. It was released on 25 July 2019 as the lead single off of Vittar's EP, 111 1 (2019) and third studio album, 111 (2020). The track is Vittar and Charli XCX's second collaboration, following "I Got It", which appears on Charli XCX's mixtape, Pop 2 (2017), and is followed by "Shake It", on her album, Charli (2019).

== Background ==
In an interview with Billboard, Vittar explained her inspiration behind making the song entirely in English, saying "I did a Pride tour in the U.S. and Canada this year, and there were a lot of fans there. They try to learn Portuguese so they can sing and communicate with me, so it's time for me to learn to speak their language too, right?"

== Composition ==
"Flash Pose" is Vittar's first English-language track. Musically, it is a "self-assured, club-ready" electropop composition influenced by house music and "inspired by the global Pride parades at which [Vittar] performs". It features a "percussive, electronic-tinged chorus", "driving" beats and "a roiling verse about wearing vintage Versace and party-hopping in a bright pink car à la Malibu Barbie" by Charli XCX. Thaís Matos of Brazilian website G1 noted the absence of the tecnobrega or funk sound Vittar's previous releases incorporated.

== Music video ==
The "Flash Pose" music video premiered one day after the song on the Grindr app, and later, on YouTube.

== Critical reception ==
Mike Wass of Idolator called the song a highlight on its parent album. Suzy Exposito of Rolling Stone placed the music video on a list of the 10 best Latin music videos of July. Alex Blynn of Billboard praised the single, writing: "The track feels eminently danceable, fun as hell and offer[ing] a new take on classic Pabllo-sounds".

== Release history ==
Region	Date	Format	Label	Ref.
Various	25 July 2019	Digital download; streaming	Sony Music Brazil	

== Certifications ==
Region	Certification	Certified units/sales
Brazil (Pro-Música Brasil)	2× Platinum	160,000^{‡}
^{‡} Sales+streaming figures based on certification alone.
