= Girls Night Out (Charli XCX song) =

Single by Charli XCX
- Released: 26 July 2018
- Recorded: 2015
- Genre: Hyperpop; bubblegum pop
- Length: 3:41
- Label: Asylum; Atlantic UK
- Songwriters: Charlotte Aitchison; Mikkel S. Eriksen; Sophie Xeon; Tor E. Hermansen
- Producer: Sophie

Charli XCX singles chronology
"Focus" / "No Angel" (2018)	"Girls Night Out" (2018)	"1999" (2018)

Audio video
- "Girls Night Out" on YouTube

"Girls Night Out" is a single by British singer Charli XCX. It was released on 26 July 2018 by Asylum Records and Atlantic Records UK as the third installment from a series of monthly single releases.

== Release ==
Following numerous live performances, a demo of the song surfaced online in 2017, originally intended for her scrapped third studio album dubbed XCX World. A version of the track featuring TYNI was recorded, but never released. The track was later finalized and mastered for its official release, featuring additional vocal production and ad-libs during the bridge. On 25 July 2018, the song was officially confirmed as the next of Charli XCX's monthly singles, to be released later that week.

== Critical reception ==
Althea Legaspi of Rolling Stone labeled the song as a "thumping, club-ready track". Henry Youtt of Billboard named the song a "peppy party anthem". Douglas Greenwood of NME thought of "Girls Night Out" as "the definitive antidote to everything bad in our lives. This song could reverse the effects of global warming. It could slash the cost of living in London to the price of a bottle of Lambrini. It's skin-cleansing; life-affirming – everything Charli XCX fans have ever wanted." In April 2022, Clash named the song among the 17 best of Charli XCX's songs, with Gem Stokes comparing its melody and production with Madonna's "Holiday" and stating that "its complete unpretentious freedom" is what makes it so enjoyable.

== Live performances ==
The song was premiered by Sophie at the Output club in Brooklyn, New York in July 2015. From 2015 to 2018 the song has been played at multiple live shows by both Charli XCX and Sophie.

The song was also remixed on a 2021 episode of Saturday Night Live for their Pride-themed sketch. The sketch featured Anya Taylor-Joy and Lil Nas X, the host and the musical guest, respectively.

== Track listing ==
Digital download
No.	Title	Length
1.	"Girls Night Out"	3:41

== Credits and personnel ==
Adapted from Tidal.

- Charli XCX – vocals, lyrics
- Sophie – production, lyrics, composition
- Stargate – co-production, composition
- Michael Freeman – mixing
- Mark "Spike" Stent – mixing
- Stuart Hawkes – mastering
