= Gone (Charli XCX and Christine and the Queens song) =

2019 single by Charli XCX and Christine and the Queens

Single by Charli XCX and Christine and the Queens

from the album Charli
- Released: 17 July 2019
- Studio: Lotus Library (Stockholm); Lotus Lounge (Los Angeles); Vincent Ave (Los Angeles)
- Genre: Progressive pop; electropop; synth-pop; funk-pop; industrial
- Length: 4:05
- Label: Asylum; Atlantic UK
- Songwriters: Charlotte Aitchison; Jonnali Parmenius; Héloïse Letissier; Linus Wiklund; Nicolas Petitfrère; Alexander Guy Cook
- Producers: A. G. Cook; Lotus IV; Nömak; Baseck (add.)

Charli XCX singles chronology
"XXXTC" (2019)	"Gone" (2019)	"Flash Pose" (2019)

Christine and the Queens singles chronology
"Comme si" (2019)	"Gone" (2019)	"People, I've Been Sad" (2020)

Audio sample
- file; help

Music video
- "Gone" on YouTube

"Gone" is a song by British singer Charli XCX and French singer Christine and the Queens. It was released on 17 July 2019 as the third single from Charli XCX's third studio album, Charli. The music video was released alongside the track.

== Background and recording ==
Charli XCX and Christine discussed the possibility of recording something together and getting to know each other for a few years before beginning the recording process for "Gone". Charli XCX recorded the song in early 2019 in Stockholm, and after finishing it, she recorded 10 other tracks that she didn't end up liking until they recorded "Gone". Charli XCX chose to give the song to Christine so he could finish his verse with the chorus. The song was then forwarded to Nömak and A. G. Cook to handle its production.

Christine assisted Charli XCX with the song when she was experiencing writer's block; she had written the song but couldn't come up with a chorus. She gave Christine a sample of what she'd come up with, and within a quarter-hour, he had returned a suggestion for the hook, which Charli XCX liked.

== Theme ==
Charli XCX said the song is about "feeling isolated and alone in crowded rooms", as well as anxiety and "learning how to be comfortable with who you truly are".

"This song is about those situations where you are surrounded by loads of people but feel so isolated and alone. I feel like that a lot of the time in social situations. I never know what to do with myself, I feel so insecure and out of place and lost. I feel like a lot of people I know get those feelings. When it comes to me, I'll either party through it and try to escape my feelings or I will totally cave in. The emotions that come alongside anxiety are so huge and crippling. This song is about breaking down but it's also about breaking free. It feels like one big external scream." – Charli XCX on her Instagram account.

== Music video ==
Charli XCX and Christine and the Queens is seen the music video on top of a car with flames.

The music video for "Gone" premiered on 17 July 2019. It begins with shots of Charli XCX and Christine struggling while tied to opposite sides of a white car atop a stage intercut with the two singing the track and dancing in a room with flashing colourful lights. At the beginning of the second verse, Christine manages to free himself before helping out Charli XCX. As the second chorus starts, rain and smoke appear in the room as the two singers dance on the car's roof. With the beginning of the outro, the rain stops and a ring of fire emerges around the stage. The music video ends with Charli XCX and Christine standing together with flames in front of them.

== Promotion ==
On 30 May 2019, Charli XCX debuted the song with Christine during her concert at Primavera Sound. An image of her setlist with "Gone" on it was shared before she performed it live for the first time. Fans first thought it was the unreleased 2018 single "Cigarettes & Alcohol" (previously known as "Better When You're Gone"); however, this was subsequently disproven when Charli XCX tweeted a sample of her rehearsing "Gone", proving that the two songs are distinct.

On 10 July, Charli XCX revealed the track's release date through social media. Several days later, she stated that she had seen "the first edit" of the music video and called it "so good". They performed the song again at the Electric Picnic festival in September 2019, as well as its first televised performance on The Jonathan Ross Show to promote the release of Charli. The duo performed the song on The Tonight Show Starring Jimmy Fallon in September 2019 as well.

== Reception ==
The day of the song's release, Pitchfork named the song "Best New Track". Writing for the publication, Anna Gaca said: "The song bangs like it's trying to get out of a big metal box, probably because that's how its creators are feeling: 'I feel so unstable, fucking hate these people/How they're making me feel lately,' sings Charli, with typical bluntness." She also notes that the track mixes the "bassy stutters and crackles of Charli's post-PC Music projects with the kinetic, bilingual funk-pop of Christine and the Queens' 2018 album Chris." Julia Gray of Stereogum wrote that on "Gone", "Charli does what she does best, taking retro aesthetics — '80s drums, '90s synths — and blasting them into the future." She also considered the song "a step in the right direction" compared to previous singles "1999" and "Blame It on Your Love". The website then named "Gone" the best song of the week.

Speaking of the music video, Kirsten Spruch of Billboard said that it "emotes the intense feelings of empowerment, sensuality and hopelessness, all wrapped into an electrifying, four-minute long visual." She also felt that the video is "pretty much everything fans would want from the two artists". Pitchfork listed the song at number 4 for the 100 best songs of 2019 and at number 145 for the 200 best songs of the 2010s. The track was also shortlisted for BBC Radio 1 DJ Annie Mac's "Hottest Record of The Year", voted for by the public, and ended up scoring third place, falling behind fellow British artists AJ Tracey and Sam Fender.

Ahead of the release of her 2022 album Crash, Consequence of Sound ranked the song as Charli's third best song.

== Track listing ==
Digital download

1. "Gone" – 4:06

Digital download – Happy Nina Kraviz Mix

1. "Gone" (Happy Nina Kraviz Mix) – 5:02

Digital download – Remixes

1. "Gone" (Devault Remix) – 5:02
2. "Gone" (Clarence Clarity Remix) – 3:50
3. "Gone" (The Wild Remix) – 3:13

== Charts ==
Chart performance for "Gone"
Chart (2019)	Peak position
Belgium (Ultratip Bubbling Under Flanders)	24
Belgium (Ultratip Bubbling Under Wallonia)	19
Canadian Hot Digital Song Sales (Billboard)	50
China Airplay/FL (Billboard)	27
France Downloads (SNEP)	26
Ireland (IRMA)	56
New Zealand Hot Singles (RMNZ)	10
Scottish Singles Sales (Official Charts)	67
UK Singles (Official Charts)	58

== Release history ==
List of release dates and formats for "Gone"
Region	Date	Format	Label	Ref.
Australia	19 July 2019	Contemporary hit radio	Warner	
