= Linus Wiklund =

Swedish songwriter and record producer

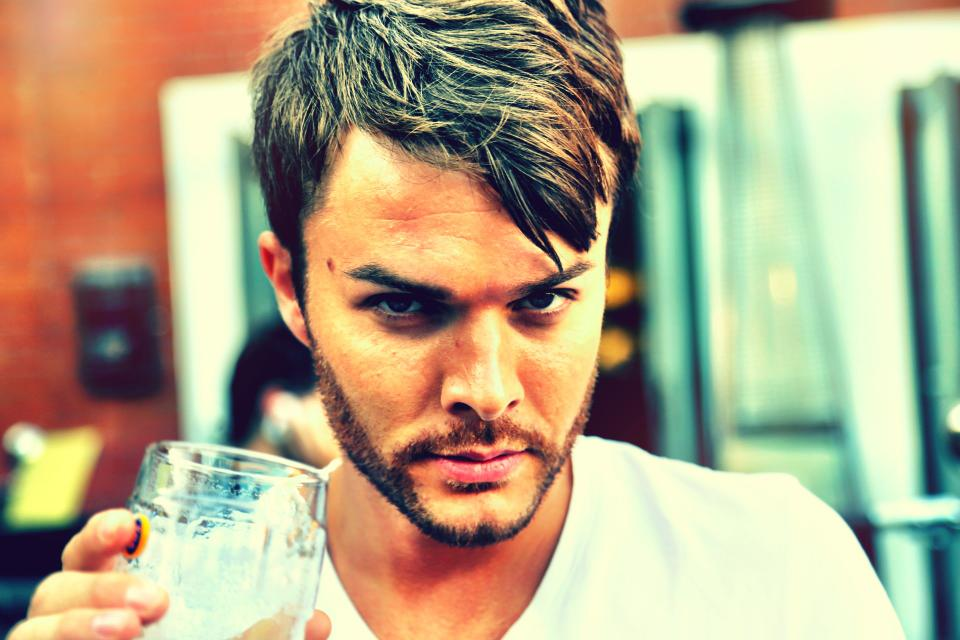
- Wiklund in 2013

Background information
- Also known as: Lotus IV
- Born: Linus Wiklund; 3 February 1983 (age 43); Stockholm, Sweden
- Occupations: Songwriter; record producer

Linus Wiklund (born 3 February 1983), also known as Lotus IV, is a Swedish songwriter and music producer. He has written and produced songs for artists such as Avicii, Zedd, Alessia Cara, Future, Ty Dolla Sign, David Guetta, Charli XCX, Sam Smith, Rita Ora, and Zara Larsson.

Wiklund co-wrote "Stay" by Zedd and Alessia Cara, which peaked at number 7 on the Billboard Hot 100 and No. 1 on Mainstream Top 40. "Stay" was the fourth most performed song on US radio in 2017.

== Discography ==
Year	Artist	Song	Album
2010	Tove Styrke	"Million Pieces"	Tove Styrke
2010	Tove Styrke	"Chaos"	Tove Styrke
2010	Tove Styrke	"Four Elements"	Tove Styrke
2012	Noonie Bao	"Do You Still Care?"	I Am Noonie Bao
2012	Noonie Bao	"The Game"	I Am Noonie Bao
2012	Noonie Bao	"Bodywork Lover"	I Am Noonie Bao
2012	Noonie Bao	"About to Tell"	I Am Noonie Bao
2012	Noonie Bao	"Big Boys Do Cry"	I Am Noonie Bao
2012	Noonie Bao	"Boom Boom"	I Am Noonie Bao
2012	Noonie Bao	"In Your Heart"	I Am Noonie Bao
2012	Noonie Bao	"You and I"	I Am Noonie Bao
2012	Noonie Bao	"No One Knows"	I Am Noonie Bao
2012	Noonie Bao	"End of the Road"	I Am Noonie Bao
2012	Don Diablo	"M1 Stinger" feat. Noonie Bao	M1 Stinger EP
2012	Avicii	"I Could Be the One" vs. Nicky Romero	Non-album single
2013	Don Diablo	"Starlight (Could You Be Mine)" with Matt Nash	Non-album single
2013	Avicii	"Always on the Run"	True
2014	Kenneth Bager	"Amazing" feat. Damon C Scott	Follow the Beat
2014	Kenneth Bager	"Follow the Beat" feat. Damon C. Scott	Follow the Beat
2014	Kenneth Bager	"What's My Name" feat. Sofie Gråbøl	Follow the Beat
2014	Kenneth Bager	"Stuck in a Lie" feat. Damon C Scott	Follow the Beat
2014	Cash Cash	"Surrender"	Blood, Sweat and 3 Years
2014	Paloma Faith	"Ready for the Good Life"	A Perfect Contradiction
2015	Alesso	"Sweet Escape" feat. Sirena	Forever
2015	Alesso	"All This Love" feat. Noonie Bao	Forever
2015	Noonie Bao	"Pyramids"	Noonia EP
2015	Noonie Bao	"Criminal Love"	Noonia EP
2015	Noonie Bao	"Ninja"	Noonia EP
2015	Noonie Bao	"I'm in Love"	Noonia EP
2015	Noonie Bao	"Oceans Deep"	Noonia EP
2016	Noonie Bao	"Reminds Me"	Non-album single
2016	Noonie Bao	"Sorry Not Sorry"	Non-album single
2017	Zedd	"Stay" with Alessia Cara	Non-album single
2017	Ty Dolla Sign	"Darkside" feat. Kiiara and Future	Bright: The Album
2018	Sasha Alex Sloan	"Fall"	Sad Girl EP
2018	Zedd	"Happy Now" with Elley Duhe	Non-album-single
2018	David Guetta	"Don't Leave Me Alone" with Anne-Marie	7
2018	Rita Ora	"Let You Love Me"	Phoenix
2018	Nicky Romero	"Paradise" with Deniz Koyu feat. Walk Off the Earth	Non-album single
2018	Clean Bandit	"Nowhere" feat. Rita Ora and Kyle	What is Love?
2019	Léon	"What You Said"	Léon
2019	Zara Larsson	"All the Time"	Non-album single
2019	Charli XCX	"Gone" with Christine and the Queens	Charli
2019	Charli XCX	"Cross You Out" feat. Sky Ferreira	Charli
2019	Charli XCX	"Miss U"	13 Reasons Why: Season 3 (A Netflix Original Series Soundtrack)
2019	AJ Mitchell	"Down in Flames"	Non-album single
2020	Ava Max	"Who's Laughing Now"	Heaven & Hell
2020	Sam Smith	"So Serious"	Love Goes
2020	Sam Smith	"Another One"	Love Goes
2021	Charli XCX	"New Shapes" feat. Christine and the Queens and Caroline Polachek	Crash
2022	Charli XCX	"Constant Repeat"	Crash
2022	Charli XCX	"Used to Know Me"	Crash
2022	Charli XCX	"Twice"	Crash
2022	Charli XCX	"Selfish Girl"	Crash
2022	Charli XCX	"Sorry If I Hurt You"	Crash
2024	Charli XCX	"Apple"	Brat
