= White Mercedes =

Single by Charli XCX

from the album Charli
- Released: 23 October 2019
- Recorded: January 2018
- Studio: Andrew Watt's house
- Genre: Pop
- Length: 3:23
- Label: Asylum; Atlantic UK
- Songwriters: Charlotte Emma Aitchison; Ali Tamposi; Andrew Watt; Nathan Perez
- Producers: A. G. Cook; Andrew Watt; Happy Perez

Charli XCX singles chronology
"Click (No Boys Remix)" (2019)	"White Mercedes" (2019)	"Bricks" (2019)

Music video
- "White Mercedes" on YouTube

"White Mercedes" is a song by British singer Charli XCX. It was released on 23 October 2019 by Asylum and Atlantic UK as the fourth and final single from her third studio album Charli (2019). It was written by Charli XCX, Ali Tamposi, Andrew Watt, Happy Perez, and produced by the latter two alongside A. G. Cook. The song is an emotional pop ballad about burning through a relationship with her boyfriend and throwing it away. An accompanying music video for the single, directed by Colin Solal Cardo, features Charli XCX interacting with a sports car, a horse and a monster truck, all colored in white.

== Background and composition ==
Lyrically, in a interview for Paper, Charli XCX explained that every time she comes back to her relationship, she becomes "this annoying, hectic person" and her then-boyfriend, Huck Kwong, ends up getting hurt. Charli XCX acknowledges she is undeserving of his love.

"White Mercedes"
30-second sample of the chorus.

"White Mercedes" is described as an emotional ballad song. The song is composed in 4/4 time and the key of F♯ major, with a tempo of 130 beats per minute.

== Music video ==
=== Synopsis ===
Charli XCX is seen in a pink fluffy ballgown while standing on top on a white monster truck

The video starts with Charli XCX performing inside a white car that's upside down, which later bursts into flames. She then interacts with a white horse and rides in the backseat of a white monster truck that crushes other cars. In the video, Charli XCX is seen wearing a pink fluffy gown with multi-colored chains, leather knee-high boots and a slicked-back ponytail. The video was filmed in Kyiv, the capital city of Ukraine.

=== Release ===
The song's music video was directed by Colin Solal Cardo and premiered on 10 October 2019 at Charli XCX's YouTube account.

== Live performances ==
On 26 September 2019, Charli XCX performed "White Mercedes" in the Artists Den concert at the Rooftop at Pier 17 in New York City and she also performed it during the Pitchfork Music Festival in Paris on 1 November 2019. The singer performed the song throughout her Charli Live Tour in 2019 and 2020.

== Formats and track listings ==
- Digital download – Remixes EP
1. "White Mercedes" [EDX's Miami Sunset Remix] – 3:20
2. "White Mercedes" [PBH & Jack Remix] – 3:10
3. "White Mercedes" [Martin Vogel Remix] – 2:53

== Credits and personnel ==
=== Location ===
- Recorded at: Andrew Watt's house

=== Personnel ===
Credits adapted from Tidal.

- Charli XCX – vocals, songwriter, executive producer
- A. G. Cook – executive producer, additional production, programmer
- Andrew Watt – songwriter, producer, guitar, keyboards, programmer
- Happy Perez - songwriter, producer, guitar, keyboards, programmer
- Serban Ghenea – mixer
- Chad Smith – drums
- Ali Tamposi – songwriter
- Nathan Perez – songwriter
- Stuart Hawkes – masterer
- John Hanes – engineer
- David Rodriguez – engineer

== Release history ==
Region	Date	Format	Version	Label	Ref.
Italy	23 October 2019	Contemporary hit radio	Original	Asylum/Atlantic UK	
Various	25 October 2019	Digital download; streaming	EDX's Miami Sunset Remix	Asylum/Atlantic UK	
Various	1 November 2019	Digital download; streaming	Marvin Vogel Remix	Asylum/Atlantic UK	
