= Happy Now (Zedd and Elley Duhé song) =

2018 single by Zedd and Elley Duhé

Single by Zedd and Elley Duhé
- Released: 18 July 2018
- Genre: Pop
- Length: 3:27
- Label: Interscope
- Songwriters: Jonnali Parmenius; Sarah Aarons; Linus Wiklund; Anton Zaslavski; Eric Barker
- Producers: Lotus IV; Zedd

Zedd singles chronology
"Stay" (covered by Riri) (2018)	"Happy Now" (2018)	"Lost in Japan" (remix) (2018)

Elley Duhé singles chronology
"Lost My Mind" (2018)	"Happy Now" (2018)	"Way Down Low" (2018)

Music video
- "Happy Now" on YouTube

"Happy Now" is a song by German music producer Zedd and American singer Elley Duhé. Written by Noonie Bao, Sarah Aarons and its producers Zedd and Lotus IV, the song was released by Interscope Records on 18 July 2018.

== Background ==
Initially titled "Are You Happy Now" featuring Norwegian singer Sigrid, the song was first revealed during a cover shoot interview in 2017 with Billboard magazine. On 3 July 2018, Zedd debuted the song at his Zedd in the Park festival, where he brought Elley Duhé on stage for a live performance. Duhé posted a short video of the performance on social media with the caption: "Not gonna lie my [heart] is pretty full". Zedd officially announced the song's release date and unveiled its cover art on 13 July, and later teased the lyrics in multiple tweets. He premiered the song on Zane Lowe's Beats 1 radio show as the World Record of the day.

During the radio interview, Zedd explained the reason behind working with Duhé: "I think why I really gravitated towards her was that she had a genuine and honest approach to the song and she felt vulnerable and real." Duhé said of the song in a press statement: "To me, 'Happy Now' is more than just a song. It's a significant moment in my life, the golden opportunity to work with one of the greatest DJ's/producer of our time. Being able to come together with complete strangers to do something beautiful, sing something meaningful, to share something special is what 'Happy Now' is all about."

== Composition ==
"Happy Now" is a post-breakup pop ballad, stylized as a "vocal-centric pop/electronic hybrid". It opens with an acoustic guitar line, before becoming "a bounding, chiming pile of percussion", eventually ending with "Zedd's signature robotic voice". The drop features a "memorable beat" composed of "whimsical, multi-toned synths cascading in mid-tempo, mellifluous breakdowns". In a press release, Zedd regarded "Happy Now" as "the most organic sounding song [he has] made in a long time", noting that the majority of the song was recorded using real instrumentation, specifically "a lot of pianos and a lot of guitars". Lyrically, he described the song as "both happy and sad at the same time", while musically, the song "rather leans towards a happier, sunnier side".

== Remixes ==
On 21 September 2018, the official remix EP was released consisting of 5 remixes from DJ Marc Benjamin, DJ duo BEAUZ, DJ duo Duke & Jones, DJ MXXWLL & DJ duo Magnificence.

== Critical reception ==
Rachel Narozniak of Dancing Astronaut called the song a representation of "yet another sonic step in a direction opposite the high-powered electro constructions of earlier foundational singles like "Clarity" and "Stay the Night'". She noticed a more minimalist melodic arrangement in the song than that in "Stay" or "The Middle".

== Personnel ==
Credits adapted from Tidal.

- Zedd – production, mixing
- Elley Duhé – vocals
- Lotus IV – production
- Mike Marsh – master engineering

== Charts ==
=== Weekly charts ===
Chart (2018–2019)	Peak position
Australia (ARIA)	27
Austria (Ö3 Austria Top 40)	64
Belgium (Ultratop 50 Flanders)	33
Belgium (Ultratop 50 Wallonia)	11
Canada Hot 100 (Billboard)	53
Czech Republic Airplay (ČNS IFPI)	5
Czech Republic Singles Digital (ČNS IFPI)	16
France (SNEP)	133
Germany (GfK)	64
Greece International (IFPI)	39
Hungary (Rádiós Top 40)	26
Hungary (Single Top 40)	29
Hungary (Stream Top 40)	26
Ireland (IRMA)	24
Japan Hot 100 (Billboard)	58
Malaysia (RIM)	8
Netherlands (Dutch Top 40)	10
Netherlands (Single Top 100)	21
New Zealand (Recorded Music NZ)	39
Norway (VG-lista)	8
Portugal (AFP)	45
Scottish Singles Sales (Official Charts)	26
Singapore (RIAS)	8
Slovakia Airplay (ČNS IFPI)	12
Slovakia Singles Digital (ČNS IFPI)	19
Sweden (Sverigetopplistan)	64
Switzerland (Schweizer Hitparade)	73
UK Singles (Official Charts)	45
US Billboard Hot 100	90
US Hot Dance/Electronic Songs (Billboard)	8
US Pop Airplay (Billboard)	30

=== Year-end charts ===
Chart (2018)	Position
Netherlands (Dutch Top 40)	53
Netherlands (Single Top 100)	80
US Hot Dance/Electronic Songs (Billboard)	22
Chart (2019)	Position
US Hot Dance/Electronic Songs (Billboard)	58

== Certifications ==
Region	Certification	Certified units/sales
Australia (ARIA)	3× Platinum	210,000^{‡}
Austria (IFPI Austria)	Gold	15,000^{‡}
Brazil (Pro-Música Brasil)	2× Platinum	80,000^{‡}
Canada (Music Canada)	2× Platinum	160,000^{‡}
Denmark (IFPI Danmark)	Gold	45,000^{‡}
France (SNEP)	Gold	100,000^{‡}
Italy (FIMI)	Gold	25,000^{‡}
New Zealand (RMNZ)	Platinum	30,000^{‡}
Portugal (AFP)	Platinum	10,000^{‡}
United Kingdom (BPI)	Silver	200,000^{‡}
United States (RIAA)	Platinum	1,000,000^{‡}
^{‡} Sales+streaming figures based on certification alone.

== Release history ==
Region	Date	Format	Label	Ref.
Various	18 July 2018	Digital download; streaming	Interscope	
United States	31 July 2018	Contemporary hit radio	Interscope	
