= Cross You Out =

2019 single by Charli XCX featuring Sky Ferreira

Promotional single by Charli XCX featuring Sky Ferreira

from the album Charli
- Released: 16 August 2019
- Studio: Lotus Library (Stockholm); Lotus Lounge (Los Angeles)
- Genre: Electropop
- Length: 3:28
- Label: Asylum; Atlantic UK
- Songwriters: Charlotte Aitchison; Alexander Guy Cook; Linus Wiklund; Jonnali Parmenius; Sky Ferreira
- Producers: A. G. Cook; Lotus IV

Audio video
- "Cross You Out" on YouTube

"Cross You Out" is a song by British singer Charli XCX featuring American singer Sky Ferreira. It was released on 16 August 2019 as the first promotional single from Charli XCX's third studio album, Charli (2019). The song was produced by A. G. Cook and Lotus IV.

== Background and lyrics ==
Charli XCX stated that the song was "about leaving some pretty traumatic people from my past behind me". NME opined that the track is "a ballad about finally severing ties with someone – and not feeling bad about it".

== Critical reception ==
Reviewing for Pitchfork, Cat Zhang noted that the track "launches with thudding electronics and bright keys," but "simmers down as Charli begins singing, her voice Auto-Tuned and vulnerable". Zhang further stated that "glitchy metallics [of the track] preserve the (un)conventional Charli sound". Rolling Stone critic Claire Shaffer called the track a "synth-heavy club banger of a breakup song" with "synths that soar as high as a Gothic cathedral", judging its lyrics to be about "finding closure and liberation in the end of a relationship". Stereogum's James Rettig described the track's chorus as "booming", while Rania Aniftos of Billboard characterised the song as a "glittery pop tune". The Independent's Helen Brown thought the track was driven by an "industrial drone of intergalactic hangar doors opening and closing, with the sweet, high vocals drifting weightless above."

== Charts ==
Chart performance for "Cross You Out"
| Chart (2019) | Peak position |
|---|---|
| New Zealand Hot Singles (RMNZ) | 36 |
