= 2099 (song) =

Promotional single by Charli XCX featuring Troye Sivan

from the album Charli
- Released: 10 September 2019
- Studio: Vincent Avenue (Los Angeles); Paramount Recording Studios (Los Angeles); Jungle City Studios (New York)
- Genre: Hyperpop; electronica; industrial
- Length: 3:25
- Label: Asylum; Atlantic UK
- Songwriters: Charlotte Aitchison; Alexander Guy Cook; Troye Sivan; Nicolas Petitfrère
- Producers: A. G. Cook; Ö

Music video
- "2099" on YouTube

"2099" is a song by British singer Charli XCX featuring Australian singer Troye Sivan. It was released on 10 September 2019 as the fourth and final promotional single from Charli XCX's third studio album, Charli (2019). The song was produced by A. G. Cook and Ö.

== Background and promotion ==
The song became the second collaboration between the two artists after the pair have previously collaborated on the track "1999" in 2018. Charli XCX and Sivan premiered and performed the song live for the first time at their own Pride music festival "Go West Fest" in Los Angeles on 6 June 2019. It was described as a sequel to their first collaboration "1999".

== Composition ==
In an interview with Paper, Charli XCX compared the song to a voyage into space. Commenting on the lyrical context, she opined that "it felt kind of poetic, I suppose, to end on "2099" with Troye, going to the future, different year". As for a deeper meaning of the song, however, she suggested that "you can read into it as much as you want, but also if you don't want to, it's fine". She further elaborated on the outro, saying that she felt it to be "so over-the-top and aggressive".

== Critical reception ==
Emily Zemler of Rolling Stone described the song as a "futuristic, synth-heavy song" and noted the "pair sharing vocals over a layers of sound". James Rettig at Stereogum preferred the studio recording to the live version, stating that "its proper recording sounds even better, a futuristic flex that looks forward instead of back". Writing for Vulture, Craig Jenkins highlighted Sivan's performance on the song, saying how he "doubles down on the natural ghostly wispiness of his voice" and pointing out that "you can almost imagine "2099" as an artifact unearthed in a distant future".

== Music video ==
Charli XCX riding a jet ski, with another rider performing flips in the background. Sivan fueled fan speculation on whether he performed the flips or used a stunt double.

The music video was released on 17 September 2019 and was directed by Bradley & Pablo. It features the singers riding jet skis and doing several flips. Alex Robert Ross of The Fader compared the visuals to the likes of James Bond. Trey Alston of MTV News assumed the video to take place in the future and pointed out that both singers visibly "have a lot of fun". Charli XCX herself described the video as "the best video ever".

== Track listing ==
2099 (Montell2099 Remix)

1. "2099 (Montell2099 Remix)" (feat. Troye Sivan) — 3:03
