= Vroom Vroom (song) =

2016 song by Charli XCX

Promotional single by Charli XCX

from the EP Vroom Vroom
- Released: 20 October 2015
- Recorded: 2015
- Genre: Hyperpop
- Length: 3:11
- Label: Atlantic UK; Vroom Vroom
- Songwriters: Charlotte Aitchison; Jonnali Parmenius; Amanda Warner; Sophie Xeon
- Producer: Sophie

Music video
- "Vroom Vroom" on YouTube

"Vroom Vroom" is a song by British singer Charli XCX from her 2016 EP of the same name. It was released as a promotional single on 25 October 2015 through a preview on Beats 1. Charli XCX wrote the track alongside Noonie Bao, MNDR, and Sophie, with the latter also producing it.

== Release ==
On 20 October 2015, Charli XCX hosted a radio show on Beats 1 where she previewed "Vroom Vroom" for the first time. The music video for "Vroom Vroom" was released on 22 April 2016 and included cameos by Sophie, A.G. Cook, and Hannah Diamond.

== Critical reception ==
"Vroom Vroom" received generally positive reviews from music critics. Reviewing the song's preview on Beats 1, James Rettig of Stereogum called it "perfect", writing that he had been listening to a bootleg live recording of the song prior to its official debut. He additionally praised Sophie's production on the track, calling it "top-notch" and rivaling her then-short career. PopCrush's Christopher Tirri called the song's beat drop "strange (in the best way possible)", lauding how its sound effects are "all strung together with a club-ready, elastic bass line that makes the onomatopoeias actually sound appealing instead of just silly." Writing for Tiny Mix Tapes, S. David lauded it as "a near-masterpiece", calling the track "a post-'Material Girl' hymn to independence, financial or otherwise: a desire for personal freedom".

Calling it one of Sophie's most essential tracks, Jared Richards of Junkee wrote: "Frenzied, aggressive, and utterly hedonistic, title track 'Vroom Vroom' takes you along for a ride, shifting gears repeatedly but never stalling. There’s a lot going on here — so many bridges, buildups, breakdowns for a three-minute track — and it demands you jump around and get ridiculous." In a ranking for the same publication, Jackson Langford named "Vroom Vroom" Charli XCX's best song, opining that "[w]hile Charli will never stop growing, 'Vroom Vroom' will always be the song that made her one of the most buzzed-about artists of the decade, so we can either hop in or eat her purple, glittery dust."

In an infamous review for Pitchfork, Laura Snapes wrote that the song "sounds like a rickety clown car whose horn toots Missy [Elliott]'s 'The Rain (Supa Dupa Fly)'—a blocky, disjointed paean to fast rides and good times." Snapes later stated that she regretted her review of the EP, as seeing Charli XCX perform live in 2019 made her "appreciate" the qualities she formerly criticized. In October 2025, "Vroom Vroom" was listed by Rolling Stone as one of the "250 Greatest Songs of the 21st Century So Far".

== Charts ==
Chart (2016)	Peak position
UK Vinyl Singles (OCC)	1
UK Physical Singles Chart (OCC)	2

== Certifications ==
Region	Certification	Certified units/sales
United Kingdom (BPI)	Silver	200,000^{‡}
^{‡} Sales+streaming figures based on certification alone.
