= Blame It on Your Love =

2019 single by Charli XCX featuring Lizzo

Single by Charli XCX featuring Lizzo

from the album Charli
- Released: 15 May 2019
- Recorded: January 2017; 2019
- Studio: Westlake (Los Angeles); The Stellar House (Venice, CA)
- Genre: Tropical house; electropop; pop; EDM
- Length: 3:11
- Label: Asylum; Atlantic UK
- Songwriters: Charlotte Aitchison; Alexandra Yatchenko; Jonnali Parmenius; Tor E. Hermansen; Mikkel S. Eriksen; Finn Keane; Melissa Jefferson
- Producer: Stargate

Charli XCX singles chronology
"1999" (2018)	"Blame It on Your Love" (2019)	"Spicy" (2019)

Lizzo singles chronology
"Juice" (2019)	"Blame It on Your Love" (2019)	"Good as Hell" (remix) (2019)

Music video
- "Blame It on Your Love" on YouTube

"Blame It on Your Love" is a song by British singer Charli XCX featuring American singer and rapper Lizzo. It was released on 15 May 2019 as the second single from the former's third studio album, Charli (2019), and soon after debuted on BBC Radio 1 as Annie Mac's "Hottest Record in the World". It was the singer's first single since her 2018 collaboration with Australian singer Troye Sivan, "1999". The single is a reworked version of a demo which later birthed "Track 10", the final track from Charli XCX's fourth mixtape, Pop 2 (2017).

== Promotion ==
Charli XCX tweeted on 13 May 2019 that she had a "bop" with Lizzo, whom she called the "queen of everything", "coming this week". Less than a day later, she confirmed the title and release date, posting a picture of herself with Lizzo, who is holding a sign saying "Bout 2 Save Pop Music". Serving as the second single from her third studio album, Charli, the song was premiered as the "Hottest Record in the World" on BBC Radio 1 on 15 May 2019, with Charli XCX also being interviewed by Annie Mac. The song's music video was released on 13 June 2019.

== Track listing ==
Digital download

1. "Blame It on Your Love" – 3:11

Digital download – Dylan Brady Remix

1. "Blame It on Your Love" (Dylan Brady Remix) – 4:00

Digital download – Seeb and kid joki Remix

1. "Blame It on Your Love" (Seeb and kid joki Remix) – 3:06

Digital download – Stripped

1. "Blame It on Your Love" (Stripped) – 3:16

Digital download – Kat Krazy Remix

1. "Blame It on Your Love" (Kat Krazy Remix) – 2:30

Digital download – Back N Fourth Remix

1. "Blame It on Your Love" (Back N Fourth Remix) – 2:46

Digital download − Remix EP

1. "Blame It on Your Love" (Back N Fourth Remix) – 2:46
2. "Blame It on Your Love" (Stripped) – 3:16
3. "Blame It on Your Love" (Kat Krazy Remix) – 2:30
4. "Blame It on Your Love" (Seeb and kid joki Remix) – 3:06
5. "Blame It on Your Love" (Dylan Brady Remix) – 4:00

== Personnel ==
Credits were adapted from Tidal.

- Charli XCX – lead vocals
- Lizzo – featured vocals
- Stargate – production, arrangement, drums, guitar, piano, synthesizer, programming, recording
- A. G. Cook – additional production
- Finn Keane – additional production
- Thomas Warren – recording
- Mark "Spike" Stent – mixing
- Matt Wolach – additional mix engineering
- Michael Freeman – additional mix engineering
- Stuart Hawkes – mastering

== Charts ==
Weekly chart performance for "Blame It on Your Love"
Chart (2019)	Peak position
Belgium (Ultratip Bubbling Under Wallonia)	27
China Airplay/FL (Billboard)	37
Czech Republic Airplay (ČNS IFPI)	16
Ireland (IRMA)	67
New Zealand Hot Singles (RMNZ)	16
UK Singles (Official Charts)	70

== Certifications ==
Region	Certification	Certified units/sales
Canada (Music Canada)	Gold	40,000^{‡}
^{‡} Sales+streaming figures based on certification alone.

== Release history ==
Region	Date	Format	Version	Label	Ref.
Various	15 May 2019	Digital download; streaming	Original	Warner	
Australia	17 May 2019	Contemporary hit radio	Original	Warner	
United Kingdom	24 May 2019	Contemporary hit radio	Original	Warner	
Various	21 June 2019	Digital download; streaming	Dylan Brady Remix	Warner	
Italy	24 June 2019	Contemporary hit radio	Original	Warner	
Various	28 June 2019	Digital download; streaming	Seeb & kid joki Remix	Warner	
Various	5 July 2019	Digital download; streaming	Kat Krazy Remix	Warner	
Various	5 July 2019	Digital download; streaming	Stripped	Warner	
Various	12 July 2019	Digital download; streaming	Back N Forth Remix	Warner	

== "Track 10" ==
"Track 10"

Song by Charli XCX

from the album Pop 2
- Released: 15 December 2017
- Length: 5:26
- Label: Asylum
- Songwriters: Charlotte Aitchison; A. G. Cook; Mikkel S. Eriksen; Tor E. Hermansen; Jonnali Parmenius; Alexandra Yatchenko
- Producers: A. G. Cook; Life Sim; Lil Data

"Track 10" is a song by British singer Charli XCX from her fourth mixtape, Pop 2 (2017).

=== Background ===
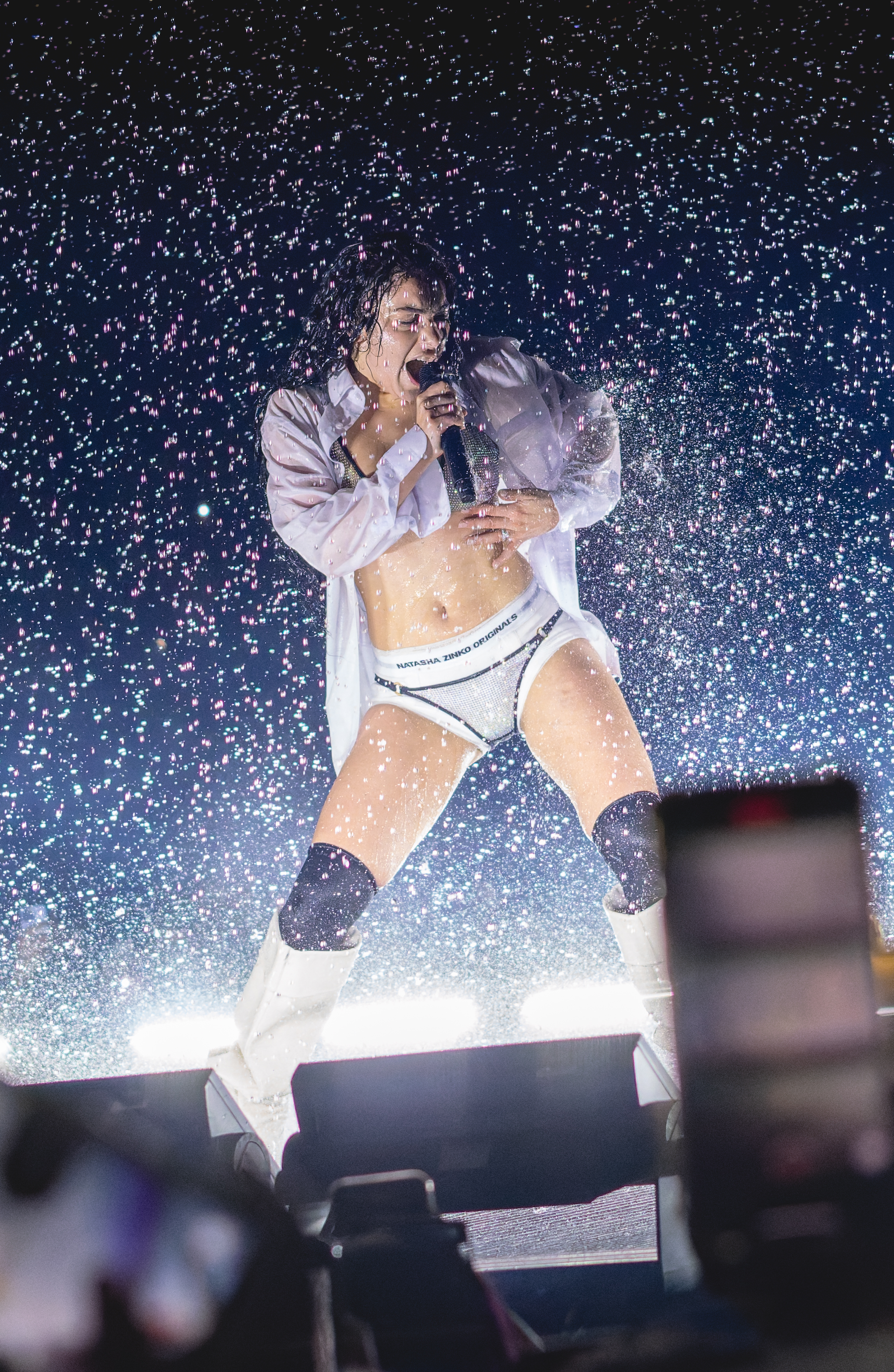
Charli XCX performing "Track 10" in 2024 during the Brat Tour with simulated rainfall

"Track 10" is the final track of Charli XCX's mixtape Pop 2 (2017). The song is a remix of an early demo of "Blame It on Your Love" into a raw, emotional, and synth-filled piece. The released version uses samples of the 2015 PC Music song "I.D.L" by Life Sim and another Pop 2 song "Tears". The demo version was later reworked into the current released version, which features additional vocals from Lizzo and was released in 2019.

=== Reception ===
"Track 10" was highly acclaimed upon the release of Pop 2, with Pitchfork placing the song at 92 on its list of the 100 Best Songs of 2018 and 85 on its list of the 200 Best Songs of the 2010s. In April 2022, Clash named "Track 10" among the 17 best of Charli XCX's songs, with Ruby Carter claiming that "it helped solidify her image of 'Charli 2.0', on the heels of her Vroom Vroom EP."

=== Personnel ===
Credits were adapted from Tidal.

- Charli XCX – lead vocals
- Noonie Bao – backing vocals
- A. G. Cook – production, executive production, programming, synthesizer
- Stargate – production, vocal production
- Life Sim – production, synthesizer
- Lil Data – production, synthesizer
- Geoff Swan – mixing
- Stuart Hawkes – mastering
