= Noonie Bao =

Swedish singer and songwriter (born 1987)

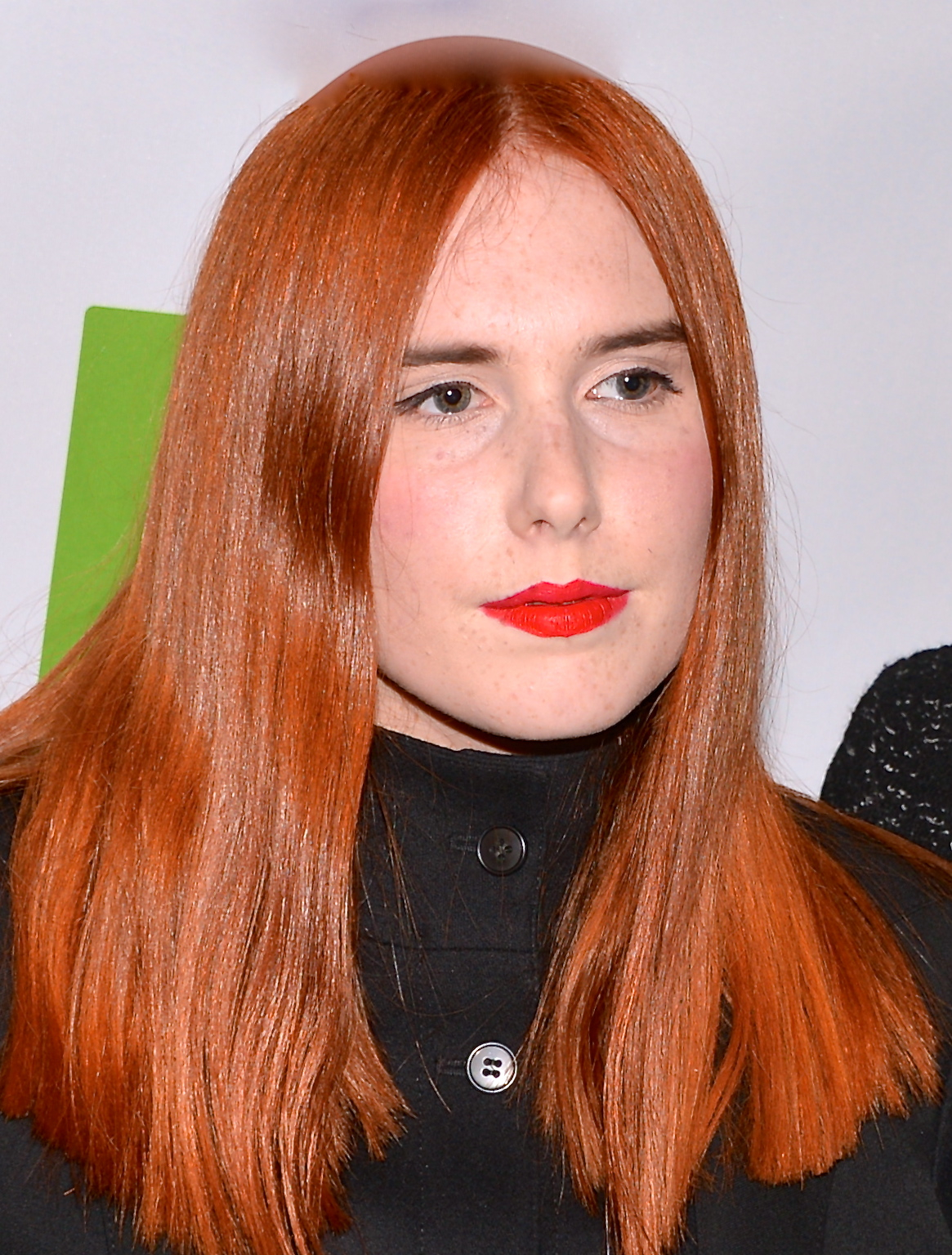
- Bao at the 2013 Grammis in Stockholm

Background information
- Born: Jonnali Mikaela Parmenius; 9 August 1987 (age 39); Stockholm, Sweden
- Genres: Pop; electropop; dance; indie pop
- Occupations: Singer; songwriter; record producer
- Instrument: Vocals
- Years active: 1999–present
- Labels: EMI Group; 2many Freckles; HYBRIS
- Website: nooniebao.com

Jonnali Mikaela Parmenius (born 9 August 1987), better known by her stage name Noonie Bao, is a Swedish singer, songwriter and record producer. She has written songs for artists such as Don Diablo, Ava Max, Katy Perry, Zara Larsson, Charli XCX, Camila Cabello, Zedd, Avicii, Kygo, David Guetta, Clean Bandit, Alesso, Feed Me, Alan Walker, and Carly Rae Jepsen.

== Early life ==
Parmenius was born in Stockholm, Sweden. She started singing at an early age, inspired by her musical parents, and performed in choir productions as a child. At the age of 12, she began to write her own songs, but at first, she did so in secret because she was embarrassed and uncomfortable singing about feelings. She attended a music school, where she was called a "black sheep". At the age of 15, a friend gave her the nickname Noonie Bao because of her appearance.

She briefly attended the Royal College of Music, Stockholm, but left and went to live with a friend in St. Gallen, Switzerland. She began to take a singing class and recorded her own songs in a friend's attic, which was her first contact with song production. Later, she worked in a recording studio in Paris.

== Career ==
After two years abroad, Noonie Bao returned to her hometown of Stockholm, where she signed a contract with the label EMI as a songwriter. She also founded a music label called 2many Freckles. Under this label, she wrote and produced songs for Adiam Dymott, Clean Bandit, Frederic Sioen, and Tove Styrke. Bao produced several songs on Tove Styrke's 2010 self-titled album, which spent 35 weeks on the Swedish charts and peaked at number 10. In 2011, the Belgian band Das Pop became aware of a song by Noonie Bao and asked her to sing backing vocals on the song "Fair Weather Friends" from their album The Game. Bao later went on tour with the band in Belgium and Europe.

In January 2012, Bao released her debut single "About to Tell". In October, she released her debut album I Am Noonie Bao, which incorporates indie pop and folk musical styles. In late 2012, she went on tour in Sweden. In 2013, she was nominated for a Grammis award in the category of Best New Artist, but lost to Icona Pop. Bao later had success as a songwriter and featured singer for Avicii and Nicky Romero's song "I Could Be the One".

In 2014, Noonie Bao co-wrote the single "Doing It" from Charli XCX's album Sucker, which peaked at number eight on the UK singles chart, as well as contributing to three other tracks on the album. The two have continued to work together, including the majority of XCX's 2016 Vroom Vroom EP and three tracks from XCX's mixtape Number 1 Angel.

In 2015, Bao released the single "I'm in Love" on SoundCloud and YouTube. In November 2015, she released her first extended play Noonia, which made a transition into more pop-based production than had initially appeared on her debut album. Continuing with this sound, Bao released the Burns-produced single "Reminds Me" in April 2016.

Charli XCX's "I Think About It All the Time," featured on Brat, was inspired by Charli's feelings about Bao having her first child.

== Discography ==
=== Studio albums ===
Title	Details
I Am Noonie Bao	Released: 31 October 2012; Label: 2many Freckles; Formats: Digital download, CD

=== Extended plays ===
Title	Details
Noonia EP	Released: 13 November 2015; Label: 2many Freckles • Universal; Formats: Digital download

=== Singles ===
==== As lead artist ====
Title	Year	Album
"About to Tell"	2012	I Am Noonie Bao
"Do You Still Care?"	2012	I Am Noonie Bao
"Bodywork Lover"	2012	I Am Noonie Bao
"The Game"	2013	I Am Noonie Bao
"I'm in Love"	2015	Noonia
"Pyramids"	2015	Noonia
"Criminal Love"	2015	Noonia
"Reminds Me"	2016	Non-album singles
"Sorry Not Sorry"	2016	Non-album singles

==== As featured artist ====
List of singles which feature Noonie Bao as a vocalist and songwriter
Title	Year	Album
"Do This Thing" (Blänk featuring Noonie Bao)	2012	Áurinko Rising Again
"M1 Stinger" (Don Diablo featuring Noonie Bao)	2012	M1 Stinger EP
"Starlight (Could You Be Mine?)" (Don Diablo and Matt Nash featuring Noonie Bao)	2013	Non-album singles
"Sunshine Stereo" (The Kenneth Bager Experience featuring Noonie Bao)	2013	Follow the Beat
"Dust Clears" (Clean Bandit featuring Noonie Bao)	2013	New Eyes
"Ruby" (Coucheron featuring Noonie Bao)	2015	Playground
"All This Love" (Alesso featuring Noonie Bao)	2015	Forever
"Monopoly" (EASYFUN featuring Noonie Bao)	2016	PC Music Volume 2

=== Guest appearances ===
List of non-single appearances which feature Noonie Bao as a vocalist and songwriter
Title	Year	Other artist(s)	Album
"Prison Break"	2008	Kocky	Stadium Status
"Just Another Song"	2012	Sebjak	Non-album song
"Rihanna"	2013	Clean Bandit	New Eyes
"I Wish I Could Be Happy"	2014	The Kenneth Bager Experience	Follow the Beat
"All This Love"	2015	Alesso	Forever
"Let You Down"	2015	iSHi	Spring Pieces
"Fades Away"	2019	Avicii	Tim

=== Songwriting credits ===
indicates a background vocal contribution.

indicates an un-credited lead vocal contribution.

indicates a credited vocal/featured artist contribution.

Year	Artist	Album	Song	Co-written with
2008	Kocky	Stadium Status	"Prison Break" (featuring Noonie Bao)	David Åström, Patrik Berggren
2010	Tove Styrke	Tove Styrke	"Chaos"	Tove Anna Linnea Styrke
2010	Tove Styrke	Tove Styrke	"Four Elements"	Tove Anna Linnea Styrke
2012	Blänk	Áurinko Rising Again	"Do This Thing" (featuring Noonie Bao)	Klas Granstrom, Lina Oehman, John Eriksson, Peter Moren, Bjorn Yttling, Simon Trabelsi
2012	Sebjak	Non-album single	"Just Another Song" (featuring Noonie Bao)	Sabastian Jakobsson
2012	Don Diablo	M1 Stinger EP	"M1 Stinger" (featuring Noonie Bao)	Don Schipper, Måns Wredenberg, Linus Wiklund, Gordon Sumner
2012	Avicii	Non-album single	"I Could Be the One" (vs Nicky Romero)	Tim Bergling, Nick Rotteveel, Arash Pournouri, Måns Wredenberg, Linus Wiklund
2013	The Kenneth Bager Experience	Follow the Beat	"Sunshine Stereo" (featuring Damon C. Scott)	Kenneth Bager, Thomas Schulz
2013	Don Diablo	Non-album single	"Starlight (Could You Be Mine)" (with Matt Nash)	Don Schipper, Matthew Nash, David Silcox, Måns Wredenberg, Linus Wiklund
2013	Galavant	Non-album single	"Tonight"	Alexander Almonte
2013	Avicii	True	"Always on the Run"	Tim Bergling, Arash Pournouri, Måns Wredenberg, Linus Wiklund
2013	Sub Focus	Torus	"Until the End" (featuring Foxes)	Nicholas Douwmba, Måns Wredenberg, Louisa Rose Allen
2014	The Kenneth Bager Experience	Follow the Beat	"Amazing" (featuring Damon C. Scott)	Kenneth Bager, Linus Wiklund, Thomas Barrett Jr.
2014	The Kenneth Bager Experience	Follow the Beat	"Follow the Beat" (featuring Damon C. Scott)	Kenneth Bager, Thomas Schulz, Linus Wiklund, Neil Ormandy
2014	The Kenneth Bager Experience	Follow the Beat	"What's My Name" (featuring Sofie Gråbøl)	Kenneth Bager, Thomas Schulz
2014	The Kenneth Bager Experience	Follow the Beat	"I Wish I Could Be Happy"	Kenneth Bager, Thomas Schulz
2014	The Kenneth Bager Experience	Follow the Beat	"Stuck in a Lie" (featuring Damon C. Scott)	Kenneth Bager, Thomas Schulz, Linus Wiklund, Ayah Marar, Bernard Hermann, Dawn Joseph, Jacob Emtatsom
2014	Clean Bandit	New Eyes	"Rihanna" (featuring Noonie Bao)	Jack Patterson, Grace Chatto
2014	Say Lou Lou	Lucid Dreaming	"Games for Girls" (with Lindstrøm)	Elektra Kilbey-Jansson, Miranda Kilbey-Jansson, Hans-Peter Lindstrøm, Jakob Emtestam
2014	Sharks	Non-album single	"Wait"	Susanna Friberg, Sophia Englund, Johan Sigerud, Jimmy "Svidden" Koitzsh, Linus Eklow, Karl Sandberg, Joakim Jarl, Marcus Grindeback
2014	Union J	You Got It All	"Midnight Train"	Eric Frederic, Andreas Schuller, Joseph Spargur, Thomas Peyton, John Ryan II
2014	Charli XCX	Sucker	"Breaking Up"	Charlotte Aitchison, Patrik Berger, Markus Krunegård
2014	Charli XCX	Sucker	"Doing It" (solo or featuring Rita Ora)	Charlotte Aitchison, Ariel Rechtshaid, Jarrad Rogers, Matthew Burns
2014	Charli XCX	Sucker	"Die Tonight"	Charlotte Aitchison, Patrik Perger, Markus Krunegård, Pontus Winnberg, Andrew Wyatt, Rostam Batmanglij
2014	Charli XCX	Sucker	"Need Ur Luv"	Charlotte Aitchison, Andrew Wyatt, Rostam Batmanglij
2015	Carly Rae Jepsen	Emotion	"Run Away with Me"	Carly Rae Jepsen, Mattias Larsson, Robin Fredriksson, Karl Schuster, Oscar Holter
2015	Coucheron	Playground	"Ruby"	Sebastian Teigen
2015	iSHi	Spring Pieces	"Let You Down" (featuring Noonie Bao)	Eshraque "iSHi" Mughal
2015	Alesso	Forever	"All This Love" (featuring Noonie Bao)	Alessandro Lindblad, Måns Wredenberg, Linus Wiklund
2015	Tommy Trash	Non-album single	"Wake the Giant" (featuring JHart)	Thomas Olsen, James Abrahart
2015	Inna	Body and the Sun	"Salinas Skies"	Wayne Hector, Andreas Schuller
2015	Avicii	Stories	"City Lights"	Tim Bergling, Arash Pournouri, Oskar Jonas Wallin
2015	Elias	Warcry EP	"Northern Lights"	Elias Sahlin, Patrik Berggren, Andreas Soderlund
2015	Mr. Oizo	Hand in the Fire	"Hand in the Fire" (featuring Charli XCX)	Quentin Dupieux, Charlotte Aitchison, Amanda Lucille Warner, Andrew Wyatt, Rostam Batmanglij
2015	Kshmr	Non-album single	"Imaginate" (with Dzeko & Torres)	Niles Hollowell-Dhar, Julian Dzeko, Luis Torres
2016	Charli XCX	Vroom Vroom EP	"Vroom Vroom"	Charlotte Aitchison, Amanda Lucille Warner, Sophie Xeon
2016	Charli XCX	Vroom Vroom EP	"Paradise" (featuring Hannah Diamond)	Charlotte Aitchison, Alexander Guy Cook, Sophie Xeon, Martin Stilling
2016	Charli XCX	Vroom Vroom EP	"Trophy"	Charlotte Aitchison, Amanda Lucille Warner, Sophie Xeon, Patrik Berger
2016	Tini	Tini	"Got Me Started"	Daniel Traynor, Jason Evigan
2016	MØ	Non-album single	"Final Song"	Karen Marie Ørsted, Uzoechi Emenike
2016	Raye	Second EP	"I, U, Us"	Rachel Keen, Charlotte Aitchison, Fredrik Gibson
2016	AlunaGeorge	I Remember	"Jealous"	Aluna Francis, George Reid, Charlotte Aitchison, Jonathan Hill, Ajay Bhattacharya
2016	MØ	Non-album single	"Drum"	Karen Marie Ørsted, Charlotte Aitchison, Michael Tucker
2016	EasyFun	PC Music Volume 2	"Monopoly" (featuring Noonie Bao)	Finn Keane
2016	Alan Walker	Different World	"Alone"	Alan Walker, Jesper Borgen, Anders Frøen, Gunnar Greve Pettersen
2017	Zedd	Non-album single	"Stay" (with Alessia Cara)	Anton Zaslavski, Anders Frøen, Alessia Caracciolo, Sarah Aarons, Linus Wiklund
2017	Charli XCX	Number 1 Angel	"Blame It on U"	Charlotte Aitchison, Alexander Guy Cook
2017	Charli XCX	Number 1 Angel	"Roll with Me"	Charlotte Aitchison, Sophie Xeon, Klas Ahlund
2017	Charli XCX	Number 1 Angel	"White Roses"	Charlotte Aitchison, Alexander Guy Cook
2017	Katy Perry	Witness	"Save as Draft"	Katheryn Hudson, Dijon McFarlane, Nicholas Audino, Lewis Hughes, Elof Loelv
2017	Camila Cabello	Non-album single	"OMG" (featuring Quavo)	Karla Estrabao, Charlotte Aitchison, Alexandra Yatchenko, Mikkel Eriksen, Tor Hermansen, Quavious Marshall
2017	Odesza	A Moment Apart	"Falls" (featuring Sasha Sloan)	Clayton Knight, Harrison Mills, Alexandra Yatchenko, Alexandra Cheatle
2017	Alma	Non-album single	"Phases" (with French Montana)	Alma-Sofia Miettinen, Charlotte Aitchison, Alexandra Yatchenko, Ryan Vojtesak, Kaelyn Behr, Rex Kudo, Karim Kharbouch
2017	Kygo	Stargazing EP	"This Town" (featuring Sasha Sloan)	Kyrre Gorvell-Dahll, Alexandra Yatchenko
2017	Demi Lovato	Tell Me You Love Me	"Cry Baby"	Demetria Lovato, Taylor Parks, Chloe Angelides, Jamie Sanderson, Kevin Hissink
2017	David Guetta	Non-album single	"Dirty Sexy Money" (with Afrojack featuring Charli XCX and French Montana)	Pierre Guetta, Nicholas van de Wall, Charlotte Aitchison, Alexander Guy Cook, Karim Kharbouch
2017	Charli XCX	Pop 2	"Track 10"	Charlotte Aitchison, Alexander Guy Cook, Alexandra Yatchenko, Mikkel Eriksen, Tor Hermansen
2017	Ty Dolla Sign	Bright OST	"Darkside" (featuring Kiiara and Future)	Tyrone Griffin Jr., Jeremy "JMIKE" Coleman, Linus Wiklund, Kiara Saulters, Nayvadius Wilburn
2018	Camila Cabello	Camila	"Never Be the Same"	Karla Estrabao, Alexandra Yatchenko, Adam Feeney, Leo Rami Dawod, Jacob Ludwig Olofsson
2018	Topic	Non-album single	"Perfect" (with Ally Brooke)	Alexandra Yatchenko, Matthew Radosevich
2018	Sasha Sloan	Sad Girl EP	"Fall"	Alexandra Yatchenko, Linus Wiklund
2018	Tinashe	Joyride	"Faded Love" (featuring Future)	Tinashe Kachingwe, Alexandra Yatchenko, Tor Hermansen, Nayvadius Wilburn
2018	Alma	Heavy Rules Mixtape	"Dance for Me" (featuring MØ)	Alma-Sofia Miettinen, Charlotte Aitchison, Karen Marie Ørsted, Andreas Schuller, Larus Orn Arnarson
2018	Jim-E Stack	Non-album single	"Somebody"	James Harmon Stack
2018	Troye Sivan	Bloom	"Dance to This" (featuring Ariana Grande)	Troye Sivan Mellet, Brett McLaughlin, Oscar Holter
2018	Kungs	Non-album single	"Be Right Here" (with StarGate featuring GOLDN)	Valentin Brunel, Robert "Throttle" Bergin, Karla Estrabao, Charlotte Aitchison, Alexandra Yatchenko, Mikkel Eriksen, Tor Hermansen
2018	Zedd	Non-album single	"Happy Now" (with Elley Duhé)	Anton Zaslavski, Sarah Aarons, Linus Wiklund
2018	David Guetta	7	"Don't Leave Me Alone" (featuring Anne Marie)	Pierre Guetta, Sarah Aarons, Linus Wiklund
2018	MØ	Forever Neverland	"Imaginary Friend"	Karen Marie Ørsted, Carlos Montagnese, William Walsh
2018	Rita Ora	Phoenix	"Let You Love Me"	Rita Sahatçiu Ora, Ilsey Juber, Linus Wiklund, Finn Keane, Fredrik Gibson
2018	Nicky Romero	Non-album single	"Paradise" (with Deniz Koyu featuring Walk off the Earth)	Nicholas Gotum, Deniz Akçakoyunlu, Måns Wredenberg, Linus Wiklund
2018	Charli XCX	Charli	"1999" (with Troye Sivan)	Charlotte Aitchison, Troye Sivan Mellet, Brett McLaughlin, Oscar Holter
2018	Rita Ora	Phoenix	"New Look"	Ilsey Juber, Jordan Suecof
2018	Clean Bandit	What Is Love?	"Nowhere" (featuring Rita Ora and Kyle)	Jack Patterson, Grace Chatto, Ilsey Juber, Linus Wiklund, Kyle Harvey
2018	Clean Bandit	What Is Love?	"24 Hours" (featuring Yasmin Green)	Jack Patterson, John Ryan II, Julian Bunetta
2019	Astrid S	Trust Issues	"Someone New"	Astrid Smeplass, Charlotte Aitchison, Jakob Hazell, Svante Halldin
2019	Sigrid	Sucker Punch	"Business Dinners"	Sigrid Raabe, Patrik Berger, Martin Stilling
2019	Sigrid	Sucker Punch	"Never Mine"	Sigrid Raabe, Martin Sjølie
2019	Marina	Love + Fear	"Enjoy Your Life"	Marina Diamandis, Oscar Holter
2019	Marina	Love + Fear	"True"	Marina Diamandis, Oscar Holter, Oscar Gorres
2019	Tritonal	U & Me	"Real" (with Evalyn)	Chad Cisneros, David Reed, Alexandra Yatchenko, Alexander Schwartz, Joseph Khajadourian, Teal Douville
2019	Carly Rae Jepsen	Dedicated	"Too Much"	Carly Rae Jepsen, Jonathan Hill, Patrik Berger
2019	Charli XCX	Charli	"Blame It on Your Love" (featuring Lizzo)	Charlotte Aitchison, Alexandra Yatchenko, Finn Keane, Mikkel Eriksen, Tor Hermansen, Melissa Jefferson
2019	Carly Rae Jepsen	Dedicated	"For Sure"	Carly Rae Jepsen, Patrik Berger, Pontus Winnberg
2019	Zara Larsson	Poster Girl	"All the Time"	Zara Larsson, Ilsey Juber, Linus Wiklund
2019	David Guetta	Non-album single	"Thing for You" (with Martin Solveig)	Pierre Guetta, Martin Picandet, Alexandra Yatchenko, Alexandra Robotham
2019	Charli XCX	Charli	"Gone" (with Christine and the Queens)	Charlotte Aitchison, Linus Wiklund, Heloise Letissier, Nicholas Petitfrere
2019	Charli XCX	Charli	"Cross You Out" (featuring Sky Ferreira)	Charlotte Aitchison, Alexander Guy Cook, Linus Wiklund
2019	Charli XCX	13 Reasons Why OST	"Miss U"	Charlotte Aitchison, Linus Wiklund, Madison Love
2019	Fall Out Boy	Blievers Never Die - Volume Two	"Dear Future Self (Hands Up)" (featuring Wyclef Jean)	Patrick Stump, Joseph Trohman, Peter Wentz, Andy Hurley, Wyclef Jean, Jens Silverstedt, Jonas Wallin
2019	Charli XCX	Charli	"Official"	Charlotte Aitchison, Alexander Guy Cook, Finn Keane, Patrik Berger
2019	Gryffin	Gravity	"Baggage" (with Gorgon City and AlunaGeorge)	Daniel Griffith, Ilsey Juber, Aluna Francis, Jakob Hazell, Svante Halldin
2019	AJ Mitchell	Non-album single	"Down in Flames"	Aaron Mitchell Jr., Linus Wiklund
2019	MØ	Non-album single	"On & On"	Karen Marie Ørsted, Patrik Berger, Frederik Berger, Martin Stilling
2020	Halsey	Manic	"I Hate Everybody"	Ashley Frangipane, Sarah Aarons, Peder Losnegård, Benjamin Levin, Magnus August Høiberg, Nathan Perez, Finneas O'Connell
2020	Dove Cameron	Non-album single	"We Belong"	Dove Cameron, Casey Smith, Jesse Shatkin
2020	Karen	Non-album single	"Repeat"	Karen Firlej, Alma-Sofia Miettinen, Charlotte Aitchison, Gerald Hoffmann, Jonas Lang, Joachim Piehl, Philip Meckseper, Martin Willumeit Jr.
2020	Carly Rae Jepsen	Dedicated Side B	"Now I Don't Hate California; After All"	Carly Rae Jepsen, Markus Krunegård, Patrik Berger, Pontus Winnberg
2020	Ava Max	Heaven & Hell	"Who's Laughing Now"	Amanda Koci, Linus Wiklund, Måns Wredenberg, Madison Love, Henry Walter
2021	Charli XCX	Crash	"Good Ones"	Charlotte Aitchison, Caroline Ailin, Mattias Larsson, Robin Fredriksson, Oscar Holter
2024	Charli XCX	Brat	"Apple"	Charlotte Aitchison, Linus Wiklund, George Daniel
2024	Kylie Minogue	Tension II	"Good as Gone"	Benjamin Kohn, Peter Kelleher, Thomas Barnes, Caroline Ailin
2026	Katseye	Wild	"Bel Air"	Stefan Gräslund, Patrik Berger, Martin Stilling, Charlotte Aitchison, Kristin Carpenter
2026	Carly Rae Jepsen	Day and Night	"Versailles"	Carly Rae Jepsen, Elias Kapari, Markus Krunegård

== Awards and nominations ==
Year	Organization	Award	Result
2013	Grammis	Best New Artist	Nominated
2017	Swedish Music Publishers Award	Songwriter of the year	Won
2017	Swedish Music Publishers Awardsl	International Success	Won
2018	Grammis	Songwriter of the year	Won
