= Click (Charli XCX song) =

2019 song by Charli XCX featuring Kim Petras and Tommy Cash

Song by Charli XCX featuring Kim Petras and Tommy Cash

from the album Charli
- Released: 13 September 2019
- Studio: Umroom (Hollywood); Vincent Ave (Los Angeles & Estonia)
- Genre: Hip hop; hyperpop
- Length: 3:53
- Label: Asylum; Atlantic UK
- Songwriters: Charlotte Aitchison; Jaan Umru Rothenberg; Theron Thomas; Tomas Tammemets; Dylan Brady; Alexander Guy Cook
- Producers: A. G. Cook; umru; Dylan Brady; Ö

Audio video
- "Click" on YouTube

"Click" is a song by British singer Charli XCX featuring German singer Kim Petras and Estonian rapper Tommy Cash from Charli XCX's third studio album, Charli (2019).

== Composition ==
A rap and hyperpop paean, it features heavy use of Auto-Tune, creating a sound that Vulture described as a "mindfuck". Petras' verse was described by Paper as "possibly the most bombastic 60 seconds in her discography to date." Her verse builds up to "one of the most exciting climaxes of the entire record, cushioned by a question of silence and torn to shreds by a mind-bending drum sample."

The final 30 seconds of the song contains "distorted blaring noise taking listeners by surprise" and earned commentary from multiple critics.

== Reception ==
Stereogum called the song "the sort of track that only Charli could pull off, silly and serious at the same time, making the 30 seconds before you pull up to a party sound like the end of the world." Paper called the final 30 seconds of the track "uncomfortable and restricting on top of being nearly painful if your volume's turned up loud enough." Speaking of the same sequence, Pitchfork called it a "montage of jagged and distorted Sophie-like sounds not dissimilar to farts". According to The Ticker, "This abrasive sound on 'Click' isn't rare for Charli XCX or PC Music, but the bratty verses from Kim Petras and the English singer drive the piercing production with an equal amount of punch that makes it stick out, even on such a sonically focused record like Charli."

== No Boys remix ==
"Click" (No Boys remix)

Single by Charli XCX featuring Kim Petras and Slayyyter
- Released: 11 October 2019
- Length: 3:51
- Label: Asylum; Atlantic UK
- Songwriters: Charlotte Aitchison; Catherine Garner; Dylan Brady; Alexander Guy Cook; Jaan Umru Rothenberg; Theron Thomas
- Producers: A. G. Cook; Dylan Brady; umru; Ö; Charli XCX (exec.)

Charli XCX singles chronology
"Flash Pose" (2019)	"Click" (No Boys remix) (2019)	"White Mercedes" (2019)

Kim Petras singles chronology
"How It's Done" (2019)	"Click" (No Boys Remix) (2019)	"Reminds Me" (2020)

Slayyyter singles chronology
"Cha Ching" (2019)	"Click" (No Boys Remix) (2019)	"2003" (2019)

On 11 October 2019, an official remix entitled "Click (No Boys Remix)" was released. The remix keeps Petras' verse from the original, but replaces Tommy Cash with American singer Slayyyter.

=== Background and composition ===
The idea of a remix was proposed by a fan to Charli XCX in a Twitter Q&A in September 2019. She quote-retweeted it with "Omg this is a v cool idea ... @slayyyter what do u think?" [sic], to which Slayyyter replied "OMG DOWN." Charli XCX started teasing the remix on her Twitter account on 11 October 2019. It was released the same day, but due to technical issues it wasn't available anywhere outside of the United Kingdom. It got released worldwide on 14 October.

According to Billboard, "the remix maintains the same glitching energy as the original album track, while also offering up a ripe opportunity for Slayyyter to deliver her own spin on the song's rap verse."

=== Critical reception ===
Paper's Tiffany Leung said of Slayyyter's "cute" verse, "Her contribution enhances the track's powerful female presence, making it an official girl-power anthem." She went on to call Charli XCX, Petras and Slayyyter "your favorite internet-savvy Gen Z pop girlies". Salvatore Maicki of The Fader thought it was "fitting that gay rights would prevail with a new megawatt Charli XCX collaboration" since its release date marked National Coming Out Day.

=== Personnel ===
Credits taken from Tidal.

- Charli XCX — vocals, songwriting, executive producer
- Kim Petras — vocals
- Slayyyter — vocals, songwriting
- Niko Battistini — assistant mixing
- Dylan Brady — production, songwriting, drum programming, sound effects, synthesizer
- Joe Burgess — assistant mixing
- Tommy Cash — engineering, vocal engineer
- A. G. Cook — production, songwriting, programming, engineering, executive producer
- Stuart Hawkes — mastering
- Aaron Joseph — engineering
- Ö — production, programming
- Geoff Swan — mixing
- Theron Thomas — songwriting
- umru — production, songwriting, bass, drum programming, engineering, sequencer synthesizer, vibes

== C2.0 ==
"C2.0"

Song by Charli XCX

from the album How I'm Feeling Now
- Released: 15 May 2020
- Recorded: April 2020
- Genre: Hyperpop
- Length: 3:40
- Label: Asylum; Atlantic UK
- Songwriters: Charlotte Aitchison; Alexander Guy Cook; Dylan Brady; Jaan Umru Rothenberg; Theron Thomas; Tommy Cash
- Producer: A. G. Cook

On 15 May 2020, a new remix titled "C2.0" was released as part of her fourth studio album, How I'm Feeling Now.

=== Background ===
In a track-by-track breakdown on Apple Music, Charli XCX has said about the track:

A. G. sent me this beat at the end of last year called "Click 2.0"—which was an updated version of my song "Click" from the Charli album. He had put it together for a performance he was doing with Caroline Polachek. I heard the performance online and loved it, and found myself listening to it on repeat while—and I’m sorry, I know this is so cheesy—driving around Indonesia watching all these colours and trees and rainbows go by. It just felt euphoric and beautiful. Towards the end of this recording process, I wanted to do a few more songs and A. G. reminded me of this track. The original "Click" features Tommy Cash and Kim Petras and is a very braggy song about our community of artists. It’s talking about how we’re the shit, basically. But through this, it’s been transformed into this celebratory song about friendship and missing the people that you hang out with the most and the world that existed before.
