= Vroom Vroom (EP) =

EP by Charli XCX
- Released: 26 February 2016
- Recorded: 2015
- Genres: Avant-pop; hyperpop
- Length: 12:19
- Labels: Vroom Vroom; Asylum
- Producers: Sophie; Jodie Harsh

Charli XCX chronology
Sucker (2014)	Vroom Vroom (2016)	Number 1 Angel (2017)

Vroom Vroom is the third extended play (EP) by British singer Charli XCX, released on 26 February 2016 by Vroom Vroom Recordings. It features production work from British producer Sophie.

The EP's experimental pop sound divided critics and fans upon release but accrued a cult following, and has been retrospectively credited as a pioneering work in what would later be termed the hyperpop movement.

== Background and release ==
In July 2015, in an interview with British fashion magazine i-D, Charli XCX said that she was working on her third album and described it as "the most pop thing, and the most electronic thing" she had done. British producer Sophie was confirmed to be involved in the album's production. On 20 October 2015, Charli XCX released "Vroom Vroom", which was the first song released from the EP, on the Beats 1 radio show, then claiming it would be the first song released from her third studio album. On 23 February 2016, it was announced that Charli XCX had set up a new record label, Vroom Vroom Recordings, and that she would release an EP titled Vroom Vroom on 27 February 2016. On 23 February 2016, the second song released from the EP, titled "Trophy", received its first play on Zane Lowe's Beats 1 show that night; Charli XCX additionally planned to host her own Beats 1 show fortnightly.

Charli XCX released a music video for the song "Vroom Vroom" on 22 April 2016 via Apple Music. On 27 May 2016, an autographed vinyl version of the EP was released in a limited run of 1,000 copies by Warner Music. On 29 August 2020, 2,000 copies of the EP were released on transparent vinyl for Record Store Day.

== Critical reception ==
Professional ratings
Aggregate scores
Source	Rating
Metacritic	64/100
Review scores
Source	Rating
Drowned in Sound	5/10
Exclaim!	6/10
The Line of Best Fit	8/10
Pitchfork	4.5/10
Resident Advisor	3.1/5 stars
Rolling Stone	3.5/5 stars
Spin	8/10
Tiny Mix Tapes	4.5/5 marks

At Metacritic, which assigns a normalised rating out of 100 to reviews from mainstream critics, the album received an average score of 64, which indicates "generally favorable reviews", based on nine reviews.

Spin gave the album a favorable review, stating that, "Vroom Vroom is scintillating new ground for Charli, totally unlike anything she's ever done before, and still quintessentially her in its streamlined, indomitable turbo-pop." Tiny Mix Tapes wrote "this is pop music reinventing itself, reasserting its autonomy", describing Sophie's production as "like liquid metal or maybe the noise equivalent of non-Euclidean geometry." The Line of Best Fit wrote that the album "sounds like a kind of nihilist, amphetamine laden rebellion; A mish mash of poppy melodies, rap, trap beats and doom ridden synth which, though on paper sounds like chaos, is clearly painstakingly curated."

Ian Gormely of Exclaim! praised "Paradise" as the "standout" track, but criticized Sophie's utilisation of vocals "across the entire EP" and expressed that the compatibility of Charli XCX and Sophie ranged from "unstoppable" to "shoehorned". Gormely concluded that "there's enough that works on Vroom Vroom to hope that it's the beginning of something much bigger". Drowned in Sound's Lee Adcock compared the EP positively to Charli XCX's previous album Sucker, but criticized its usage of "pre-established styles of other black artists" to create "PG-rated, glittery sketches of excess bling and forbidden love".

In a negative review for Pitchfork, Laura Snapes wrote that "no one is being done any favors reducing Charli XCX to a vapid cypher, particularly as it drains her vivid personality from the work".

== Impact ==
In November 2019, Laura Snapes expressed regret about her review of Vroom Vroom published on Pitchfork, tweeting that she would like to "publicly disavow the nonsense" she wrote about the EP. In October 2021, the site included it in their "Rescored" list, with Cat Zhang suggesting an adjustment of the EP's score from 4.5 to 7.8, retrospectively claiming that, "[a]t the time, many critics seemed to be paranoid about PC Music's motives. Nervous that they'd be bamboozled, they obsessed over whether a pop experiment was either satire or sincere."

In April 2022, Clash's Ruby Carter characterized the EP as a "blueprint for bubblegum pop" that cemented Charli XCX's "vision for Charli 2.0 and a predecessor for her more experimental work on Pop 2, Charli, and How I'm Feeling Now."

== Track listing ==
Vroom Vroom track listing
No.	Title	Writer(s)	Producer(s)	Length
1.	"Vroom Vroom"	Charlotte Aitchison; Sophie Xeon; Noonie Bao; Amanda Lucille Warner	Sophie; Martin Stilling^{[a]}; Patrik Berger^{[a]}	3:13
2.	"Paradise" (featuring Hannah Diamond)	Aitchison; Xeon; Bao; A. G. Cook; Stilling	Sophie; Stilling^{[a]}; Berger^{[a]}	3:01
3.	"Trophy"	Aitchison; Xeon; Bao; Warner; Berger	Sophie; Stilling^{[a]}; Berger^{[a]}; Hal Ritson^{[b]}; Richard Adlam^{[b]}	2:39
4.	"Secret (Shh)"	Xeon; James Allen Clarke; Jesse St. John Geller; Jessica Karpov	Sophie; Jodie Harsh	3:25
Total length:				12:18

Notes

- ^{^[a]} signifies a vocal producer
- ^{^[b]} signifies an additional producer
- "Trophy" contains an audio snippet from the motion picture Pulp Fiction performed by Uma Thurman

== Personnel ==
- Charli XCX – lead vocals
- Noonie Bao – additional vocals (1–3)
- Kate Kennedy – additional vocals (3)
- MNDR – additional vocals (3)
- Rob Orton – mixer (1)
- Sophie – mixer (2–4), programming (4)
- Jodie Harsh – mixer, programming (4)
- Stuart Hawkes – mastering engineer
- Tony Lake – additional engineer (1)
- Richard Adlam – sound effects, additional programming (3)
- Hal Ritson – sound effects, additional programming (3)

== Charts ==
Chart (2016)	Peak position
US Top Dance Albums (Billboard)	2

Chart (2026)	Peak position
Hungarian Physical Albums (MAHASZ)	16
US Top Album Sales (Billboard)	43
