= 1999 (Charli XCX and Troye Sivan song) =

2018 single by Charli XCX and Troye Sivan

Single by Charli XCX and Troye Sivan (Note: On physical releases of Charli, "1999" is credited to Charli XCX featuring Troye Sivan.)

from the album Charli
- Released: 5 October 2018
- Studio: Henson Studios (Los Angeles); Wolf Cousins Studios (Stockholm); MXM Studios (Los Angeles)
- Genre: Eurodance; electropop
- Length: 3:09
- Label: Asylum; Atlantic UK
- Songwriters: Charlotte Aitchison; Jonnali Parmenius; Oscar Holter; Troye Sivan; Brett McLaughlin; Max Martin
- Producer: Oscar Holter

Charli XCX singles chronology
"Girls Night Out" (2018)	"1999" (2018)	"Blame It on Your Love" (2019)

Troye Sivan singles chronology
"Animal" (2018)	"1999" (2018)	"Revelation" (2018)

Music video
- "1999" on YouTube

"1999" is a song by British singer Charli XCX and Australian singer Troye Sivan, released as the lead single from the former's third studio album, Charli (2019), on 5 October 2018. The single cover was inspired by the 1999 film The Matrix. It follows several singles released earlier in 2018 by Charli XCX and Sivan's 2018 album Bloom. The track reached number 13 on the UK Singles Chart dated 22 November 2018, becoming Charli XCX's tenth top 40 single and first top 15 single since 2015, as well as Sivan's fourth top 40 single and his first top 20 single.

A sequel to the track, "2099", was released as a promotional single in September 2019.

"1999" was playable in Just Dance Unlimited on Just Dance 2020 but was removed on August 1, 2024, due to licensing constraints.

== Background and composition ==
=== Background ===
The song contains nostalgic lyrical references to the titular year along with a snare-heavy beat, "fuzzy sawtooth bass and sparking Eurodance keys". Sasha Geffen of Pitchfork stated that the track is "more concerned with the act of remembering than with the specifics of the year it calls up itself" and "fits alongside the rest of Charli XCX's sleek, forward-looking pop songs". The song also references Britney Spears' 1998 debut single, "...Baby One More Time", as suggested by Max Martin.

=== Musical composition ===
The song is written in the key of B minor, with an allegro tempo of 124 BPM in 4/4 common time. Sivan's and Charli XCX's voices span between the notes B_{3} and F#_{5}.

== Artwork ==
The cover art references the 1999 film The Matrix, with Sivan dressed as Neo, wearing dark sunglasses, a black overcoat, and dyed black hair against a bright green background. Charli XCX, who is dressed as Trinity, flanks him. Billboard also noted its similarity to Aaliyah in the music video for her 2000 song "Try Again".

== Promotion ==
Charli XCX and Sivan tweeted lyrics from "1999" addressed to each other on Twitter before sharing the cover art and title of the song.

== Music video ==
Charli dressed as all the Spice Girls in the "Say You'll Be There" music video

The music video was released on 11 October 2018, and features Sivan and Charli XCX in various homages to 1990s pop culture, including the iMac G3 and Steve Jobs, the Spice Girls, Britney Spears and Justin Timberlake, New Radicals, Eminem, the Nokia 3310, Rose McGowan and Marilyn Manson, the films Titanic, The Matrix, American Beauty, and The Blair Witch Project, the Dancing baby, the video game The Sims, and the music videos for the songs "Say You'll Be There", "Waterfalls", "Thinking of You (I Drive Myself Crazy)", and "I Want It That Way". For many of the homages, deepfake technology was used.

== Track listing ==
Digital download

1. "1999" – 3:09

Digital download — Stripped version

1. "1999" (Stripped) – 3:21

Digital download — The Knocks Remix

1. "1999" (The Knocks Remix) – 3:41

Digital download – Remixes

1. "1999" (Alphalove remix) – 3:55
2. "1999" (Easyfun remix) – 3:12
3. "1999" (Michael Calfan remix) – 3:03
4. "1999" (R3hab remix) – 3:18
5. "1999" (Carta remix) – 2:52
6. "1999" (Super Cruel remix) – 2:51
7. "1999" (Young Franco remix) – 3:33
8. "1999" (Dipha Barus remix) – 2:28
9. "1999" (The Knocks remix) – 3:40

== Charts ==
=== Weekly charts ===
Chart (2018–2019)	Peak position
Australia (ARIA)	18
Belgium (Ultratip Bubbling Under Flanders)	32
Belgium (Ultratip Bubbling Under Wallonia)	44
Finland Digital Songs (Billboard)	9
Greece International Digital Singles (IFPI)	83
Hungary (Dance Top 40)	30
Hungary (Single Top 40)	40
Ireland (IRMA)	28
Israel (Media Forest TV Airplay)	5
New Zealand Hot Singles (RMNZ)	10
Netherlands (Tipparade)	14
Scottish Singles Sales (Official Charts)	24
South Korea International Downloads (Gaon)	96
Sweden Heatseeker (Sverigetopplistan)	15
UK Singles (Official Charts)	13
US Dance Club Songs (Billboard)	48
US Pop Airplay (Billboard)	37
US Pop Digital Songs (Billboard)	23

2024 weekly chart performance for "1999"
Chart (2024)	Peak position
Moldova Airplay (TopHit)	74

=== Year-end charts ===
Chart (2019)	Position
Australia (ARIA)	100
Hungary (Dance Top 40)	87

== Certifications ==
Region	Certification	Certified units/sales
Australia (ARIA)	2× Platinum	140,000^{‡}
Denmark (IFPI Danmark)	Gold	45,000^{‡}
New Zealand (RMNZ)	Platinum	30,000^{‡}
United Kingdom (BPI)	Platinum	600,000^{‡}
^{‡} Sales+streaming figures based on certification alone.

== Release history ==
Region	Date	Format	Version	Label	Ref.
Various	5 October 2018	Digital download; streaming	Original	Asylum	
Various	9 November 2018	Digital download; streaming	Alphalove remix	Asylum	
Various	16 November 2018	Digital download; streaming	Easyfun remix	Asylum	
Various	23 November 2018	Digital download; streaming	Michael Calfan remix	Asylum	
United States	4 December 2018	Contemporary hit radio	Original	Atlantic	
Various	18 January 2019	Digital download; streaming	Remixes	Asylum	

== Vengaboys version ==
In September 2021, Vengaboys released a cover version of the song, which was retitled "1999 (I Wanna Go Back)" and came with a deepfake-style video which saw the cover stars from various 1990s albums lip-syncing to the song and the band put into the Friends title sequence with the sofa and fountain. One of the "deepfakes" is superimposed on the single cover of Vengaboys' own "We're Going to Ibiza".
