= Charli (album) =

Studio album by Charli XCX
- Released: 13 September 2019
- Recorded: 2017–2019
- Studios: Vincent Avenue (Los Angeles) and (Estonia); Lotus Lounge (Los Angeles); MXM (Los Angeles); Henson (Los Angeles); Westlake (Los Angeles); Paramount Recording (Los Angeles); PC Music (London) and (Atlanta); Sarm (London); Lotus Library (Stockholm); Wolf Cousins (Stockholm); Umroom (Hollywood); Kung Fu (Berlin); Flume's House (Los Angeles); The Stellar House (Venice, California); Gold Tooth Music (Beverly Hills, California); Below (New Orleans); Jungle City (New York City)
- Genres: Avant-pop; electropop; futurepop; hyperpop
- Length: 50:53
- Languages: English; French; Korean; Portuguese
- Labels: Asylum; Atlantic
- Producers: A. G. Cook; Andrew Watt; Dylan Brady; Finn Keane; Happy Perez; Lotus IV; Nicolas Petitfrère (Note: Nicolas Petitfrère uses the stage names Ö and Nömak. As both stage names are credited on this release, his credits on this article are attributed to his real name for clarity.); Oscar Holter; Patrik Berger; Peter Carlsson; Planet 1999; Stargate; Umru

Charli XCX chronology
Pop 2 (2017)	Charli (2019)	How I'm Feeling Now (2020)

Singles from Charli
- 1. "1999" Released: 5 October 2018; 2. "Blame It on Your Love" Released: 15 May 2019; 3. "Gone" Released: 17 July 2019; 4. "White Mercedes" Released: 23 October 2019

Charli is the third studio album by British singer Charli XCX, released on 13 September 2019 through Asylum and Atlantic Records UK. Charli was preceded by the singles "1999" with Troye Sivan, "Blame It on Your Love" featuring Lizzo, "Gone" with Christine and the Queens, and "White Mercedes". Charli was also promoted by the promotional singles "Cross You Out" featuring Sky Ferreira, "Warm" featuring Haim, "February 2017" featuring Clairo and Yaeji, and "2099" also featuring Sivan. Musically, it has been described as avant-pop, electropop, futurepop, and hyperpop.

The album received positive reviews from critics, who applauded the production and songwriting. Most reviewers praised the album's boldness, experimentation, and catchy melodies. The album was also supported by the Charli Live Tour, beginning in Atlanta on 20 September 2019 and concluding in Mexico City on 21 October 2020.

== Background and recording ==
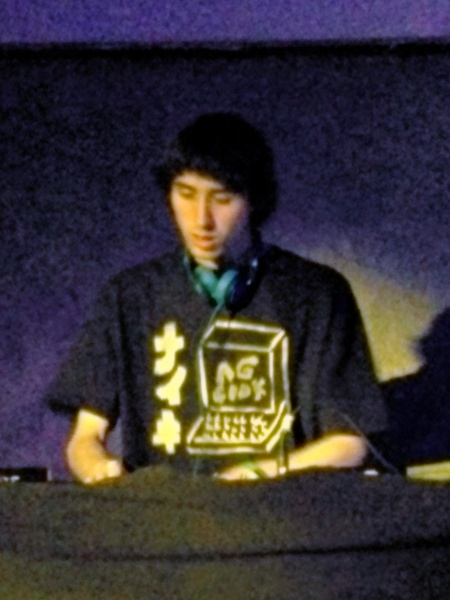
Executive producer A. G. Cook came up with the album title Charli.

In 2017, Charli XCX was preparing to release her third studio album. However, a hacker managed to steal several demo tracks from her Google Drive and leaked them online. Fans gave the collection of leaks the unofficial title XCX World, though a title and track list was never finalised for the album. After the leaks, Charli XCX decided to scrap the entire project and make the album anew.

After a series of monthly single drops in the summer of 2018, Charli XCX released the lead single of the album, "1999", in October 2018. Charli XCX and executive producer A. G. Cook continued recording the album in November 2018 at Flume's studio in Los Angeles, California. The project was initially intended to be the third release in a trilogy of mixtapes, following the release of Number 1 Angel and Pop 2. The title was to include the number "3", continuing the numbering motif, but the plan was never finalised. After two weeks of recording, Charli XCX decided that the work would instead be her third studio album. Recording continued in Eagle Rock from January to March 2019, where the majority of the album's songwriting and production took place. The song "White Mercedes" was recorded in Andrew Watt's home. After abandoning the idea of having "3" in the title, the working title for the album was Best Friends before Cook suggested the title Charli.

== Release and promotion ==
On 13 June 2019, Charli XCX announced Charli, along with its cover art, release date, and track list that featured 15 tracks and 14 collaborations. Charli XCX debuted "Gone" with Christine and the Queens at Primavera Sound in Barcelona on 30 May and "2099" with Troye Sivan at the Go West Fest in Los Angeles on 6 June.

The album was supported by the Charli Live Tour. The tour was announced alongside the album's official reveal on 13 June 2019. The tour started on 20 September 2019 in Atlanta, United States and concluded in February 2020 in Australia.

=== Singles ===
"Gone"
Sample of the album's third single "Gone", a collaboration with Christine and the Queens. Charli XCX stated that the song is executive producer A. G. Cook's "best production".

The album's lead single is a collaboration with Australian singer Troye Sivan, titled "1999". It was released on 8 October 2018, and its music video was released on 11 October 2018. The album's second single is the original version of "Track 10", a song from Charli XCX's mixtape Pop 2, titled "Blame It on Your Love". It features American singer and rapper Lizzo, and was released on 15 May 2019. The album's third single, "Gone", is a collaboration with French singer and songwriter Christine and the Queens, featuring lyrics in both English and French. It was released on 17 July 2019 alongside the track's music video. "White Mercedes", the albums fourth and last single, was released on 23 October 2019.

=== Promotional and remix singles ===
The album's first promotional single, "Cross You Out", features American singer-songwriter Sky Ferreira, and was released on 16 August 2019. The second promotional single, "Warm", features American pop-rock band Haim, and was released on 30 August 2019. The third promotional single, "February 2017", features American singer-songwriter Clairo and Korean-American electronic music artist Yaeji, and was released on 6 September 2019. The fourth and final promotional single, "2099", features Sivan, and was released on 10 September 2019. The music video for "2099", showcasing Charli XCX and Sivan riding on jet skis, was released a week later on 17 September 2019.

The "No Boys" remix of "Click" was released on 11 October 2019. The remix keeps Kim Petras' verse from the original but replaces Tommy Cash with Slayyyter.

== Critical reception ==
Professional ratings
Aggregate scores
Source	Rating
AnyDecentMusic?	7.6/10
Metacritic	80/100
Review scores
Source	Rating
AllMusic	3.5/5 stars
The Guardian	4/5 stars
The Line of Best Fit	7/10
NME	4/5 stars
Pitchfork	7.8/10
Q	3/5 stars
Rolling Stone	4/5 stars
The Skinny	5/5 stars
Slant Magazine	4/5 stars
The Telegraph	4/5 stars

Charli was met with positive reviews from music critics. At Metacritic, which assigns a normalised rating out of 100 to reviews from professional critics, the album received an average score of 80, based on 22 reviews. At AnyDecentMusic?, which uses a weighted formula to find an average rating out of 10, it received a score of 7.6 based on 22 reviews.

In a five-star review, Bethany Davison of The Skinny wrote "Charli is an expansive record, flooded with joy and heartache, consolidated in its array of features. Alongside indulgently unadorned ruminations on fear and love, the record is boundlessly liberating, decadently indulgent, and irresistibly danceable. Aitchison [Charli XCX] has delivered her greatest work yet". Valerie Magan of Clash awarded the album 9/10, commenting: "Charli is no doubt an album of too many features and too many parts, but it somehow all fits together in a way that allows her penchant for unconventional songwriting and her ear for an exciting melody to work in concert, creating a project better than most anything she's done in the past". Hannah Mylrea of NME stated that Charli is "Bold, brash and brilliant, this is Charli XCX at her most genuine, and it's dazzling." Neil McCormick of The Telegraph commented that "The sexy android cover and star-studded collaborations (including alternative icons Lizzo, Haim and Christine and the Queens) on her third album, Charli, suggest an all-guns-blazing pitch for blockbuster status. But the contents are far weirder than that implies [...] Come the century's end, you can almost imagine future critics scratching their AI-augmented brains and still touting Charli XCX as the next big thing." The Line of Best Fit gave the album the "Album of the Week" designation, with Claire Biddles adding that "Charli is almost there. Ultimately she's too gloriously messy and multitudinous to produce such a thing. Although she could often benefit from an editor, her process and vision doesn't adhere to the music industry's prioritisation of the album format – which feels right for an artist whose music could be read as an attempt to dissolve time itself."

Mick Jacobs, writing for PopMatters, gave the album a 6/10 rating, noting that "compared to the previous compilations' sense of liberation, Charli sounds at odds with its some of its invested players and parts: the label, the fans, and Charli the artist." Jacobs praised the track "Silver Cross", but criticised others such as "Thoughts" and "Blame It on Your Love", which he described as "an unneeded revamp [that] seems to exists just because her and Lizzo share both a label and rising profiles in the industry." Rachel Aroesti of Q gave the album a mixed review, writing, "Between Cook's trademark production and the song-stealing brilliance of her collaborators, it often feels as if Aitchison's nasal croon and counter-intuitive toplines are the least interesting bits of her own project."

=== Year-end lists ===
Publication	Accolade	Rank	Ref.
Consequence of Sound	Top 50 Albums of 2019	30	
The Guardian	The 50 Best Albums of 2019	21	
NME	The 50 Best Albums of 2019	47	
Paste	The 50 Best Albums of 2019	42	
Stereogum	The 50 Best Albums of 2019	22	
Uproxx	The Best Albums of 2019	32	
Uproxx	The 35 Best Pop Albums of 2019	10	
Variety	The Best Albums of 2019	1	
Vice	The 100 Best Albums of 2019	10	

== Commercial performance ==
Charli debuted at number 14 on the UK Albums Chart with sales of 4,177 combined units. It opened at number forty-two on the US Billboard 200 with sales of 13,200 album-equivalent units, of which 5,500 were pure album sales.

== Track listing ==
Charli track listing
No.	Title	Lyrics	Music	Producer(s)	Length
1.	"Next Level Charli"	Charlotte Aitchison	Alexander Guy Cook	Cook	2:37
2.	"Gone" (with Christine and the Queens)	Aitchison; Noonie Bao; Héloïse Letissier	Linus Wiklund; Nicolas Petitfrère; Cook	Cook; Lotus IV; Petitfrère; Baseck^{[a]}	4:06
3.	"Cross You Out" (featuring Sky Ferreira)	Aitchison; Bao; Sky Ferreira	Wiklund; Cook	Cook; Lotus IV	3:28
4.	"1999" (with Troye Sivan)	Aitchison; Bao; Troye Sivan; Brett McLaughlin	Oscar Holter	Holter; Peter Carlsson^{[b]}	3:09
5.	"Click" (featuring Kim Petras and Tommy Cash)	Aitchison; Theron Thomas; Tomas Tammemets	Jaan Umru Rothenberg; Dylan Brady; Cook	Cook; Umru; Brady; Petitfrère^{[a]}	3:53
6.	"Warm" (featuring Haim)	Aitchison; Este Haim; Danielle Haim; Alana Haim	Cook	Cook	3:45
7.	"Thoughts"	Aitchison	Cook	Cook	3:11
8.	"Blame It on Your Love" (featuring Lizzo)	Aitchison; Sasha Sloan; Bao; Lizzo	Stargate; Finn Keane	Stargate; Cook^{[a]}; Keane^{[a]}	3:11
9.	"White Mercedes"	Aitchison; Ali Tamposi	Andrew Wotman; Nathan Perez	Andrew Watt; Happy Perez; Cook^{[a]}	3:23
10.	"Silver Cross"	Aitchison	Cook	Cook	3:28
11.	"I Don't Wanna Know"	Aitchison	Cook	Cook	3:05
12.	"Official"	Aitchison; Bao	Patrik Berger; Cook; Keane	Cook; Keane; Berger	3:04
13.	"Shake It" (featuring Big Freedia, Cupcakke, Brooke Candy, and Pabllo Vittar)	Aitchison; Elizabeth Harris; Freddie Ross Jr.; Pabllo Vittar	Cook; Petitfrère; Rodrigo Gorky; Pablo Bispo; Arthur Marques; Zebu; Maffalda	Cook; Petitfrère	4:35
14.	"February 2017" (featuring Clairo and Yaeji)	Aitchison; Katherine Yaeji Lee; Claire Cottrill	Charles Teiller; Caroline Beatrix Maurin; Alexandre Teiller; Cook	Planet 1999; Cook	2:33
15.	"2099" (featuring Troye Sivan)	Aitchison; Sivan	Cook; Petitfrère	Cook; Petitfrère	3:25
Total length:					50:53

Charli Japanese CD edition bonus tracks
No.	Title	Writer(s)	Producer(s)	Length
16.	"Gone" (Clarence Clarity remix) (with Christine and the Queens)	Aitchison; Bao; Wiklund; Letissier; Petitfrère	Cook; Lotus IV; Petitfrère; Baseck^{[a]}; Clarence Clarity^{[c]}	3:51
17.	"Blame It on Your Love" (Kat Krazy remix) (featuring Lizzo)	Aitchison; Keane; Sloan; Lizzo; Bao; Stargate	Stargate; Cook^{[a]}; Keane^{[a]}; Kat Krazy^{[c]}	2:30
18.	"1999" (Alphalove remix) (with Troye Sivan)	Aitchison; McLaughlin; Holter; Bao; Sivan	Holter; Alphalove^{[c]}	3:55
Total length:				61:09

Notes

- ^{^[a]} signifies an additional producer
- ^{^[b]} signifies a vocal producer
- ^{^[c]} signifies a remix producer
- Physical releases of Charli credit Troye Sivan as a featured artist instead of a co-lead artist on "1999".
- "Next Level Charli" interpolates a section of "Selecta" by Mz. Bratt.

== Personnel ==
Credits adapted from the album's liner notes.

- Charli XCX – vocals, executive production
- A. G. Cook – programming (1–3, 5–7, 9–16), backing vocals, synthesisers (12), executive production, engineering (1, 5–7, 10–14)
- Christine and the Queens – vocals and vocal engineering for Christine and the Queens (2, 16)
- Lotus IV – programming (2, 3, 16), recording for Sky Ferreira (3)
- Nicolas Petitfrère – programming (2, 5, 13, 15, 16), engineering (13)
- Sky Ferreira – additional vocals (3)
- Troye Sivan – additional vocals (4, 15, 18)
- Oscar Holter – programming, keyboards, bass, guitar vocal production (4, 18)
- Kim Petras – additional vocals (5)
- Tommy Cash – additional vocals and vocal engineering (5)
- Dylan Brady – soft synthesisers, drum programming, harsh noise (5)
- Umru – drum programming, vocal processing, bass, synth sound design, "vibes" and engineering (5)
- Haim – additional vocals (6)
- Lizzo – additional vocals (8, 17)
- Mikkel Eriksen – all drums, guitar, piano, synthesisers, programming and recording (8, 17)
- Tor Erik Hermansen – all drums, guitar, piano, synthesisers, programming (8, 17)
- Andrew Watt – keyboards, guitar, programming (9)
- Happy Perez – keyboards, guitar, programming (9)
- Chad Smith – drums (9)
- Noonie Bao – backing vocals (12)
- Finn Keane – backing vocals, guitar, programming (12)
- Patrik Berger – synthesisers, programming (12)
- Big Freedia – additional vocals (13)
- Cupcakke – additional vocals (13)
- Brooke Candy – additional vocals (13)
- Pabllo Vittar – additional vocals (13)
- Clairo – additional vocals (14)
- Katherline Yaeji Lee – additional vocals and engineering (14)
- Planet 1999 – drum programming, synthesisers, bass and engineering (14)
- Șerban Ghenea – mixing (4, 9, 18)
- Mark "Spike" Stent – mixing (8, 17)
- John Hanes – mix engineering (4, 9)
- Niko Battistini – mixing assistance (1–3, 5–7, 10–16)
- Joe Burgess – mixing assistance (1–3, 5–7, 10–16)
- Michael Freeman – mixing assistance (8, 17)
- Matt Wolach – mixing assistance (8, 17)
- Aaron Joseph – engineering (5)
- David Rodriguez – engineering (9)
- Blake Mares – engineering (10)
- Gethin Pearson – engineering (12)
- Ben Lorio – engineering, recording for Big Freedia (13)
- Kourosh Poursalehi – engineering (15)
- Sean Klein – engineering (15)
- Stuart Hawkes – mastering (1–3, 5–15)
- Randy Merrill – mastering (4)
- Clarence Clarity – mastering (16)
- AYA – mastering (17)
- Kevin Grainger – mastering (18)
- Noah Passovoy – vocal recording (4, 18)
- Peter Carlsson – vocal recording, vocal production (4, 18)
- Thomas Warren – recording (8, 17)
- Oscar Schiller – recording for Brooke Candy (13)
- Bastien Doremus – vocal engineering for Christine and the Queens (2, 16)
- Andrew "Schwifty" Luftman – production coordination (9)
- Zvi "Angry Beard Man" Edelman – production coordination (9)
- Sarah "Goodie Bag" Shelton – production coordination (9)
- Drew "Grey Poupon" Salamunovich – production coordination (9)
- Jeremy "Jboogs" Levin – production coordination (9)
- David "Dsilb" Silberstain – production coordination (9)
- Samantha Corrie "SamCor" Schulman – production coordination (9)
- Jed Skrzypczak – creative design
- Ines Alpha – digital art

== Charts ==
Chart performance for Charli
Chart (2019)	Peak position
Australian Albums (ARIA)	7
Austrian Albums (Ö3 Austria)	73
Belgian Albums (Ultratop Flanders)	55
Belgian Albums (Ultratop Wallonia)	54
Canadian Albums (Billboard)	50
French Albums (SNEP)	92
German Albums (Offizielle Top 100)	91
Irish Albums (IRMA)	21
Japan Hot Albums (Billboard Japan)	46
Japanese Albums (Oricon)	86
Lithuanian Albums (AGATA)	63
New Zealand Albums (RMNZ)	26
Scottish Albums (Official Charts)	9
Spanish Albums (Promusicae)	28
Swiss Albums (Schweizer Hitparade)	54
UK Albums (Official Charts)	14
US Billboard 200	42
