= Atlantic Music Group =

Umbrella label owned by Warner Music Group

- Atlantic Music Group's current logo used since 2025
- Parent company: Warner Music Group
- Founded: 2004
- Genre: Various
- Country of origin: United States
- Official website: atlanticrecords.com

Atlantic Music Group (formerly known as Atlantic Records Group until October 2024) is an umbrella label owned by Warner Music Group. It consists of three major labels: 300 Entertainment, 10K Projects, and Atlantic Records. The CEO is Elliot Grainge. In total, the label group has nearly three hundred artists on its roster.

== History ==
In 2004, Time Warner sold Warner Music to a group of private investors. As a cost-cutting maneuver, the new owners of Warner Music Group merged Atlantic Records with its sister, Elektra Records, to form The Atlantic Records Group. Upon the merger, Elektra became largely dormant, with most of its retained roster absorbed by Atlantic. In the years to follow, Atlantic Records Group would add a host of other labels to its umbrella, including: Roadrunner Records, Fueled by Ramen, Custard Records and Maybach Music Group. Elektra was reactivated as a brand of Atlantic Records Group in 2009. The same year Atlantic's dance and hip hop imprint Big Beat Records, which scored notable success for most of the 1990s (but had been in hibernation since 1998) was also relaunched.

On June 18, 2018, Warner Music Group announced the formation of Elektra Music Group to be launched as a stand-alone, independently managed primary label at WMG on October 1. Splitting off from Atlantic Records Group, EMG will take with it five labels that previously operated under the Atlantic group (including Elektra Records), three label staff, and a handful of major artists. Elektra's independence renews the WEA (Warner-Elektra-Atlantic) triad that had for decades mark the original company organization. Elektra co-presidents, however, will answer to Atlantic Records Group Chairman/CEO Craig Kallman and Chairman/COO Julie Greenwald.

In 2020, Atlantic Records announced the relaunching of its original subsidiary label Atco Records, under the authority of its A&R President Pete Ganbarg. This reactivation of Atco Records marks the first time in over 25 years that the label has actively operated under the Atlantic Records umbrella.

In 2024, Elliot Grainge become CEO. Atlantic Records Group was renamed to Atlantic Music Group. 300 Elektra Entertainment was dissolved, with imprints remaining under Atlantic Records. The three boutique labels from Oct 1 2024 to present day are 300 Entertainment, 10K Projects, and Atlantic Records

== Labels ==
- Atlantic Records
- Atlantic Outpost
- Big Beat Records (imprint only)
- BuVision (Distribution via 10K Projects)
- DCD2 Records (Distribution via Atlantic Records)
- Elektra Records (imprint only)
- Fueled by Ramen (imprint only)
- Roadrunner Records (imprint only)
- Sparta (Distribution via 300 Entertainment)
- 300 Entertainment
- 10K Projects
- Modhaus

== Atlantic Records UK ==
Atlantic Records UK
- Parent company: Warner Music Group
- Founded: 2004
- Founder: Max Lousada
- Distributors: Warner Music Group (International); Atlantic Music Group (United States)
- Country of origin: United Kingdom
- Location: London
- Official website: atlanticrecords.co.uk

Atlantic Records UK is a British record label used as copyright-holder for UK releases on the Atlantic label. It was founded in June 2004 when Warner Music Group bought East West Records from Time Warner and rebranded its UK operation. The first Chairman was Max Lousada, previously Head of A&R at Mushroom Records UK and, as of June 2019, chairman and CEO Warner Music UK. In 2011 Atlantic Records UK was named Label of the Year at the Music Week Awards. In the same year, The Guardian put Lousada joint 20th in its "Music Power 100" list of influential figures in the UK music industry. He shared his place with John Reid and Christian Tattersfield, both from Warner. In October 2011, the7stars advertising agency announced it had won a pitch to handle Atlantic Records UK's £2 million media planning and buying account, taking over from ZenithOptimedia. In 2014, Ben Cook was appointed president, Atlantic Records UK, reporting to Lousada. In 2019, the label was reconfigured around A&R, Promotions, Marketing, Publicity, Creative and Audience.

By 2010, their artists included Flo Rida, Jay-Z, T.I., Lupe Fiasco, B.o.B, Missy Elliott and Plan B and by 2014 the list included Paolo Nutini, Ed Sheeran, Birdy, Rudimental, Marina and the Diamonds, Rumer, Twenty One Pilots, Lykke Li, Santigold and Clean Bandit. Current and older releases are listed on Discogs.

== Atlantic Records France ==
Atlantic Records France
- Parent company: Warner Music France
- Founded: March 4, 2024
- Distributors: Warner Music Group (International); Atlantic Music Group (United States)
- Genre: Various
- Country of origin: France
- Location: Paris

Atlantic Records France is a French record label used as copyright-holder for France releases on the Atlantic label.

By 2024, their artists included Tiakola.
