= Crash: The Live Tour =

2022–2023 concert tour by Charli XCX

- Tour by Charli XCX
- Location: North America; Europe; Asia; Latin America; Australia
- Associated album: Crash
- Start date: 26 March 2022
- End date: 2 March 2023
- No. of shows: 69
- Supporting acts: A. G. Cook; Alaska Reid; Baby Tate; Elio; Magdalena Bay; Yeule

Charli XCX concert chronology
- Charli Live Tour (2019-2020); Crash: The Live Tour (2022–2023); Sweat (2024)

Crash: The Live Tour was the third solo concert tour by British singer Charli XCX, in support of her fifth studio album Crash (2022). The tour began on 26 March 2022 in Oakland, California, United States, and concluded on 5 March 2023 in Perth, Australia.

== Background ==
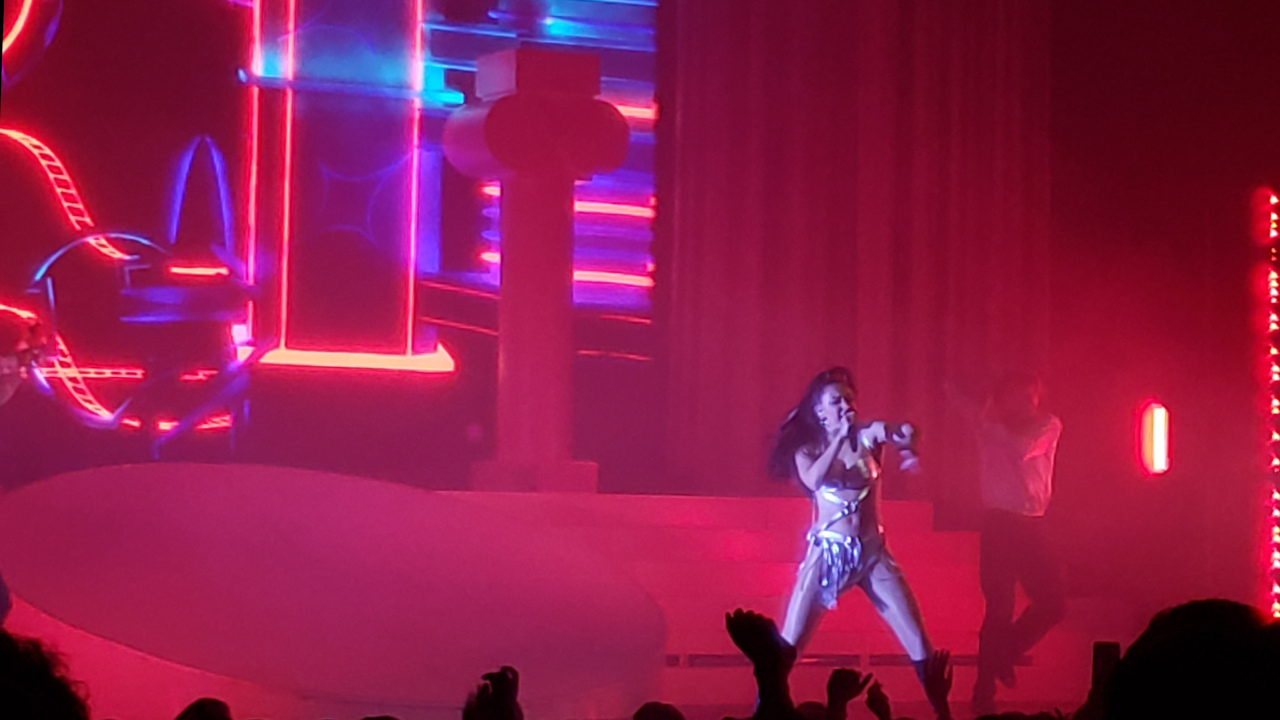
Charli XCX performing "Yuck" on tour

On 4 November 2021, Charli XCX announced the first leg of the tour alongside the album and the release of the single "New Shapes". On 18 February 2022, she announced the opening acts for the tour. Producer and Charli XCX's frequent collaborator A. G. Cook, rapper Baby Tate and synth-pop duo Magdalena Bay opened the North American leg, while the European leg was supported by electronic musician Yeule and pop artist Elio. On 5 April, Charli XCX announced the second leg of North American tour dates.

== Set list ==
This set list is from the concert on 26 March 2022, in Oakland, California, United States. It is not intended to represent all tour dates.

Act 1

1. "Lightning"
2. "Gone"
3. "Move Me"
4. "Constant Repeat"

Act 2

5. "Baby"
6. "Yuck"
7. "Every Rule"
8. "Party 4 U"
9. "Used to Know Me"
10. "1999"
11. "Beg for You"

Act 3

12. "Crash"
13. "Boom Clap"
14. "Boys"
15. "New Shapes"
16. "Twice"

Encore

17. "Vroom Vroom"
18. "Visions"
19. "Unlock It"
20. "Good Ones"

=== Notes ===
- During the Los Angeles show on 3 April 2022, Charli XCX performed "1999" with Troye Sivan and "Unlock It" with Kim Petras.
- During the London show on 19 May 2022, Charli XCX performed "New Shapes" with Caroline Polachek.
- During the Paris show on 25 May 2022, Charli XCX performed "Gone" and "New Shapes" with Christine and the Queens.
- During the Primavera Sound Festival on 2 June 2022, Charli XCX performed "Beg For You" with Rina Sawayama. "Every Rule" and "Twice" were not performed.
- During the Orange Warsaw Festival on 3 June 2022, Charli XCX performed "I Love It". "Every Rule" and "Twice" were not performed.
- During the Hurricane Festival on 17 June 2022, Charli XCX performed "I Love It". "Every Rule", "Crash", "Twice" and "Visions" were not performed.
- During the Glastonbury Festival on 26 June 2022, Charli XCX performed "New Shapes" with Caroline Polachek. Charli XCX also performed "I Love It". "Every Rule" and "Twice" were not performed.
- During the Milwaukee Summerfest Festival on 8 July 2022, Charli XCX performed "I Love It", "Spicy", "Hot in It", and "Out Out". "Move Me", "Every Rule", "Crash", "New Shapes", "Twice", and "Visions" were not performed.
- During the 80/35 Music Festival on 9 July 2022, Charli XCX performed "I Love It", "Spicy", "Hot in It" and "Out Out". "Every Rule", "Crash" and "Twice" were not performed.
- During the Washington, DC show on 6 August 2022, Charli XCX performed the remixed version of "Charger" with Elio after "Visions".
- During the São Paulo, SP show on 9 November 2022, Charli XCX performed "I Got It" with Pabllo Vittar.
- During the Corona Capital Festival on 18 November 2022, Charli XCX performed "I Love It", "Track 10", "Hot in It", and "I Got It". "Move Me", "Baby", "Yuck", "Every Rule", "Used to Know Me", "Crash", "New Shapes", "Twice", and "Visions" were not performed
- During both Coachella performances, Charli XCX performed the remixed version of "Welcome to My Island" by Caroline Polachek.
- The concerts on the 25 and 26 of February at Wollongong and Gold Coast and 4 and 5 of March at Melbourne and Perth was part of the For The Love music festival in Australia.

== Tour dates ==
List of concerts, showing date, city, country, venue and opening acts
Date	City	Country	Venue	Opening acts	Attendance	Revenue
Leg 1 — North America
26 March 2022	Oakland	United States	Fox Oakland Theatre	A. G. Cook; Baby Tate	5,779 / 5,952	$234,210
27 March 2022	Oakland	United States	Fox Oakland Theatre	A. G. Cook; Baby Tate	5,779 / 5,952	$234,210
29 March 2022	Portland	United States	Crystal Ballroom	Baby Tate	—	—
1 April 2022	San Diego	United States	The Observatory North Park	Baby Tate	—	—
3 April 2022	Los Angeles	United States	Greek Theatre	A. G. Cook; Baby Tate	—	—
6 April 2022	Denver	United States	Ogden Theatre	—N/a (Note: Due to feeling unwell, Baby Tate cancelled her appearance for the Denver show.)	—	—
8 April 2022	Austin	United States	ACL Live at the Moody Theater	Baby Tate	—	—
9 April 2022	Houston	United States	House of Blues	Baby Tate	—	—
10 April 2022	Dallas	United States	House of Blues	Baby Tate	—	—
12 April 2022	New Orleans	United States	Orpheum Theater	Baby Tate	—	—
13 April 2022	Atlanta	United States	The Eastern (Atlanta)	Baby Tate	—	—
15 April 2022	Asheville	United States	The Orange Peel	Baby Tate	1,050 / 1,050	$38,176
16 April 2022	Norfolk	United States	The NorVa	Baby Tate	—	—
18 April 2022	Philadelphia	United States	The Fillmore	Baby Tate	—	—
20 April 2022	Boston	United States	House of Blues	Baby Tate	2,425 / 2,425	$97,167
22 April 2022	New York City	United States	Hammerstein Ballroom	Baby Tate; Magdalena Bay	—	—
23 April 2022	New York City	United States	Hammerstein Ballroom	Baby Tate; Magdalena Bay	—	—
25 April 2022	Toronto	Canada	Massey Hall	Baby Tate	—	—
26 April 2022	Royal Oak	United States	Royal Oak Music Theatre	Baby Tate	—	—
28 April 2022	Saint Paul	United States	Palace Theatre	Baby Tate	2,351 / 2,351	$85,860
29 April 2022	Chicago	United States	Byline Bank Aragon Ballroom	Baby Tate; Magdalena Bay	4,763 / 4,763	$169,087
Leg 2 — Europe
13 May 2022	Dublin	Ireland	3Olympia Theatre	—N/a (Note: Due to "unforeseen circumstances", Yeule could not travel to Ireland for the Dublin show.)	1,661 / 1,661	$67,781
15 May 2022	Glasgow	Scotland	O_{2} Academy	Yeule	2,550 / 2,550	$78,124
17 May 2022	Manchester	England	O_{2} Victoria Warehouse	Yeule	—	—
18 May 2022	Birmingham	England	O_{2} Academy Birimgham	Yeule	—	—
19 May 2022	London	England	Alexandra Palace	Yeule	—	—
21 May 2022	Norwich	England	UEA LCR	Yeule	—	—
22 May 2022	Sheffield	England	O_{2} Academy Sheffield	Yeule	—	—
23 May 2022	Nottingham	England	Rock City	Yeule	—	—
25 May 2022	Paris	France	Le Trianon	Elio	—	—
30 May 2022	Berlin	Germany	Astra Kulturhaus	Elio	1,400 / 1,400	$45,073
31 May 2022	Cologne	Germany	Carlswerk Victoria	Elio	1,600 / 1,600	$51,665
2 June 2022 (Note: The concerts on 2 and 9 June 2022 at the Parc del Fòrum in Barcelona, Spain are part of Primavera Sound.)	Barcelona	Spain	Parc del Fòrum	—N/a	—N/a	—N/a
3 June 2022 (Note: The concert on 3 June 2022 at Racetrack Służewiec in Warsaw, Poland is a part of Orange Warsaw Festival.)	Warsaw	Poland	Racetrack Służewiec	—N/a	—N/a	—N/a
4 June 2022	Milan	Italy	Fabrique	Elio	—	—
7 June 2022	Madrid	Spain	Sala La Riviera	Elio	—	—
8 June 2022	Barcelona	Spain	Razzmatazz	Elio	—	—
9 June 2022	Barcelona	Spain	Parc del Fòrum	—N/a	—N/a	—N/a
17 June 2022 (Note: The concert on 17 June 2022 at the Eichenring in Scheeßel, Germany is a part of Hurricane Festival.)	Scheeßel	Germany	Eichenring	—N/a	—N/a	—N/a
18 June 2022 (Note: The concert on 18 June 2022 at the Neuhausen ob Eck Airfield in Tuttlingen, Germany is a part of Southside Festival.)	Tuttlingen	Germany	Neuhausen ob Eck Airfield	—N/a	—N/a	—N/a
26 June 2022 (Note: The concert on 26 June 2022 at the Worthy Farm in Pilton, England is a part of Glastonbury Festival.)	Pilton	England	Worthy Farm	—N/a	—N/a	—N/a
Leg 3 — North America
8 July 2022 (Note: The concert on 8 July 2022 at the BMO Harris Pavilion in Milwaukee, United States is a part of Summerfest.)	Milwaukee	United States	BMO Harris Pavilion	—N/a	—N/a	—N/a
9 July 2022 (Note: The concert on 9 July 2022 at the Western Gateway Park in Des Moines, United States is a part of 80/35 Music Festival.)	Des Moines	United States	Western Gateway Park	—N/a	—N/a	—N/a
12 July 2022 (Note: The concert on 12 July 2022 at the Parc de la Francophonie in Quebec City, Canada is a part of Festival d'été de Québec.)	Quebec City	Canada	Parc de la Francophonie	—N/a	—N/a	—N/a
21 July 2022	Vancouver	Canada	Orpheum	Alaska Reid	—	—
22 July 2022 (Note: The concert on 22 July 2022 at Capitol Hill in Seattle is a part of Capitol Hill Block Party.)	Seattle	United States	Capitol Hill	—N/a	—N/a	—N/a
23 July 2022	Boise	United States	Knitting Factory Concert House	Alaska Reid	—	—
28 July 2022 (Note: The concert on 28 July 2022 at the Grant Park in Chicago, United States is a part of Lollapalooza.)	Chicago	United States	Grant Park	—N/a	—N/a	—N/a
29 July 2022 (Note: The concert on 29 July 2022 at the Parc Jean-Drapeau in Montreal, Canada is a part of Osheaga Festival.)	Montreal	Canada	Parc Jean-Drapeau	—N/a	—N/a	—N/a
2 August 2022	Indianapolis	United States	Egyptian Room	Elio	—	—
3 August 2022	Nashville	United States	Ryman Auditorium	Elio	—	—
5 August 2022	Pittsburgh	United States	Stage AE	Elio	2,300 / 2,300	$82,885
6 August 2022	Washington, D.C.	United States	The Anthem	Elio	6,000 / 6,000	$298,875
Leg 4 — Europe
26 August 2022 (Note: The concert on 26 August at Bramham Park in Leeds is part of Leeds Festival.)	Leeds	England	Bramham Park	—N/a	—N/a	—N/a
27 August 2022 (Note: The concert on 27 August at Victoria Park in London is part of All Points East.)	London	England	Victoria Park	—N/a	—N/a	—N/a
28 August 2022 (Note: The concert on 28 August at Little John's Farm in Reading is part of Reading Festival.)	Reading	England	Little John's Farm	—N/a	—N/a	—N/a
3 September 2022 (Note: The concert on 3 September at Clifton Down in Bristol is part of Forwards Festival.)	Bristol	England	Clifton Down	—N/a	—N/a	—N/a
Leg 5 — North America
16 September 2022 (Note: The concert on 16 September at downtown Las Vegas is part of Life Is Beautiful Music & Art Festival.)	Las Vegas	United States	Downtown Las Vegas	—N/a	—N/a	—N/a
17 September 2022 (Note: The concert on 17 September at Royal Athletic Park in Victoria is part of Rifflandia Festival.)	Victoria	Canada	Royal Athletic Park	—N/a	—N/a	—N/a
24 September 2022 (Note: The concert on 24 September 2022 at Pier 80 in San Francisco is part of Portola Music Festival.)	San Francisco	United States	Pier 80	—N/a	—N/a	—N/a
25 September 2022 (Note: The concert on 25 September 2022 at The Woodlands in Dover is a part of Firefly Music Festival.)	Dover	United States	The Woodlands	—N/a	—N/a	—N/a
Leg 6 — Asia
29 October 2022 (Note: The concert on 29 October at Ariake Arena in Tokyo is part of TONAL TOKYO.)	Tokyo	Japan	Ariake Arena	—N/a	—N/a	—N/a
Leg 7 — Latin America
6 November 2022 (Note: The concert on 6 November at the Anhembi Convention Center in São Paulo, Brazil is part of Primavera Sound São Paulo.)	São Paulo	Brazil	Anhembi Convention Center	—N/a	—N/a	—N/a
9 November 2022	São Paulo	Brazil	Audio Club	—N/a	—N/a	—N/a
12 November 2022 (Note: The concert on 12 November at the Costanera Sur in Buenos Aires, Argentina is part of Primavera Sound Buenos Aires.)	Buenos Aires	Argentina	Costanera Sur	—N/a	—N/a	—N/a
13 November 2022 (Note: The concert on 13 November at the Parque Bicentenario de Cerrillos in Santiago, Chile is part of Primavera Sound Santiago.)	Santiago	Chile	Parque Bicentenario	—N/a	—N/a	—N/a
18 November 2022 (Note: The concert on 18 November at the Autódromo Hermanos Rodríguez in Mexico City, Mexico is part of Corona Capital .)	Mexico City	Mexico	Autódromo Hermanos Rodríguez	—N/a	—N/a	—N/a
Leg 8 — Oceania
24 February 2023 (Note: The concert on 24 February at The Domain in Sydney, Australia is part of WorldPride Sydney .)	Sydney	Australia	The Domain	—N/a	—N/a	—N/a
25 February 2023	Gold Coast	Australia	Doug Jennings Park		—N/a	—N/a
26 February 2023	Wollongong	Australia	Thomas Dalton Park		—N/a	—N/a
28 February 2023	Brisbane	Australia	The Tivoli	Prophecy Girl		
2 March 2023	Melbourne	Australia	Northcote Theatre	Prophecy Girl		
4 March 2023	Melbourne	Australia	Catanti Gardens	—N/a		
5 March 2023	Perth	Australia	Taylor Reserve	—N/a		

=== Cancelled shows ===
List of cancelled concerts, showing date, city, country, venue and opening acts
Date	City	Country	Venue	Reason of cancellation
27 May 2022	Brussels	Belgium	La Madeleine	Illness
28 May 2022	Utrecht	Netherlands	Ronda Hall	Illness
29 May 2022 (Note: The scheduled concert for 29 May 2022 at the War Memorial Park in Coventry, England was supposed to be a part of BBC Radio 1's Big Weekend.)	Coventry	England	War Memorial Park	Illness
