= Itala Fulvia Villa =

Argentine architect

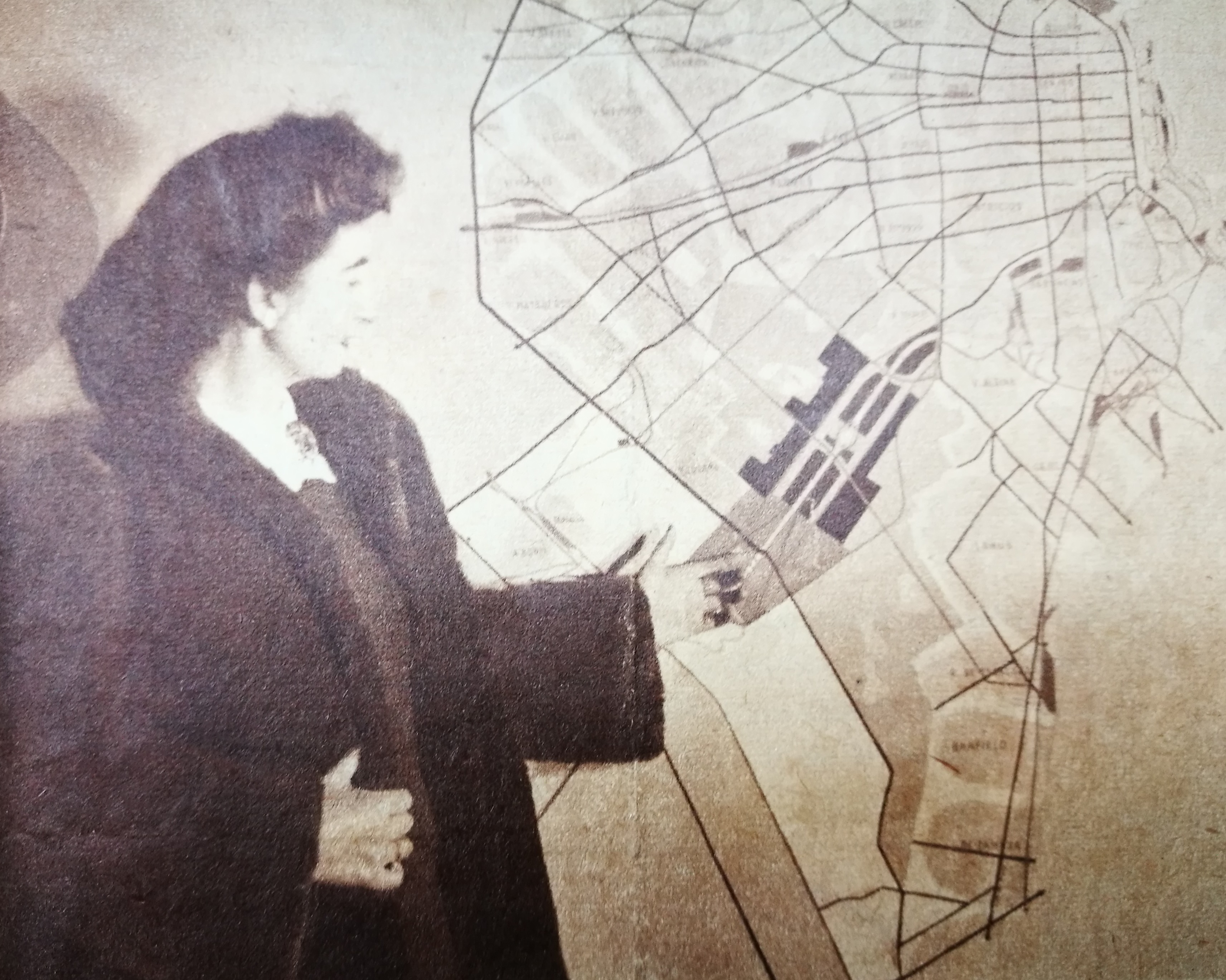
- Born: Itala Fulvia Villa; 1913
- Died: 1991 (aged 77–78); Argentina
- Occupation: Architect

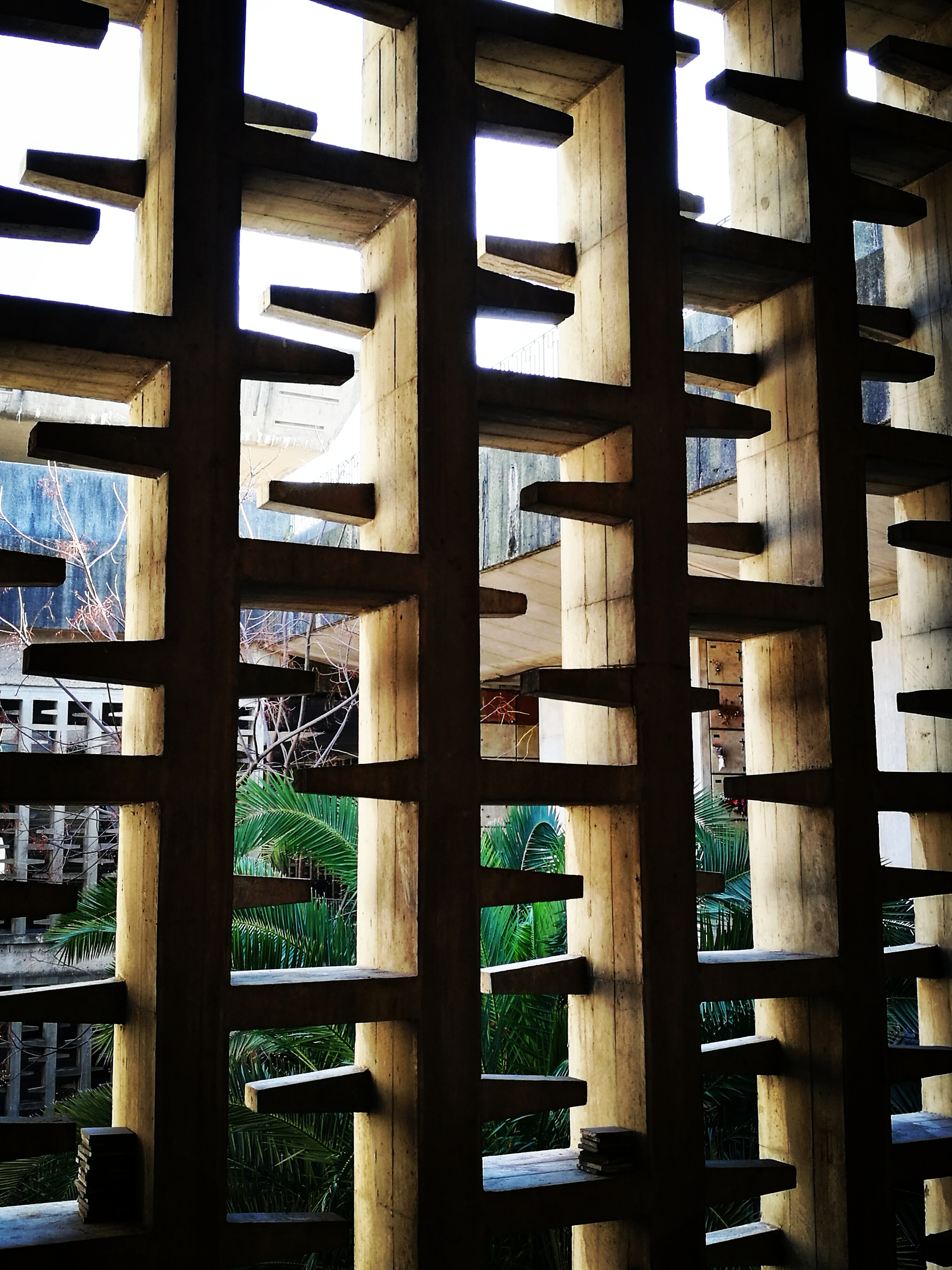
Concrete screen designed by Villa at La Chacarita cemetery

Itala Fulvia Villa (1913–1991) was an Argentine architect whose main forte was city planning. She was an integral part of creating and designing the urban model for the city of Buenos Aires. As part of urbanization process, she designed and built a plan for the neighborhood known as Bajo Flores, where Pope Francis grew up, for which she received first prize in the 6th National Exhibition of Architecture Fair in 1945. In 1979, she was a representative of the Argentina Federation of University Women.

== Biography ==
Itala Fulvia Villa was born in 1913. She obtained her degree from the School of Architecture of the University of Buenos Aires in 1935. In 1938, she was involved with the founding of the Grupo Austral in association with Antonio Bonet, Jorge Ferrari Hardoy, Juan Kurchan, Juan A. Lepera, Abel López Chas, Luis Olezza, Samuel Sánchez de Bustamante, Simón Ungar, Alejandro Vera Barros, and Hilario Zalba. This group of architects were particularly noted for bringing the modernist movement to Argentina. They were the first group to recognize that the urbanist movement must holistically look at the needs of the city and its culture, rather than randomly building individual structures. They advocated for green space, parks and streets to be designed for meeting the needs of growth and attempted to bring scientific analysis into city planning. While they viewed cultural development as a key component of architectural identity, they did not believe in preserving historic structures for the sake of history but rather whether analysis proved a structure had adaptability to future societal growth and function.

In 1939 she collaborated in the building activity on Arcos street in the Núñez barrio with Violet Lorraine Pushkin. They built a four-plex rental unit, which is a two–storied apartment designed to modern standards of brick and stone with frescoes on the lower level. That same year, Villa sent photographs and diagrams to Jorge Ferrari Hardoy who was in Paris meeting with Le Corbusier creating the first urban plan for Buenos Aires. Her contributions were acknowledged in a supplement of Nuestra Arquitectura published in 1939. The pictures, which were aerial photographs, created a 9-foot x 9-foot photomontage of the entire boundaries of Buenos Aires.

In 1945 in the Bajo Flores barrio, Villa led a team which included Horacio E. Nazar and took into consideration the unique aspects of the area. Located between the Riachuelo River and the Cildáñez Stream, the district was prone to flooding and the first step was to have the Ministry of Public Works dam the waterways, creating three lakes. Implementing Villa's model neighborhood, called for filling the lowlands with dirt from the excavations of Villa Soldati and Villa Lugano to elevate areas which could be used for additional streets and footpaths. Creation of four new highways and elimination of some 20 railway-crossings to address traffic flow issues were integral to the design. Zoning for residential and industrial areas was implemented, creating an industrial-belt along both banks of the river and housing in close proximity. The development plan proposed accommodations for 38,450 people, an Olympic stadium and recreational centres. The housing scheme was projected to provide low-cost housing for workers and offered both easy proximity to work and modern plumbing services. The design won the First Prize at the 6th National Exhibition of Architecture.

Villa's most significant architectural legacy was a regional plan known as the División de Información Urbana General de Obras Públicas y Planeamiento Municipal, which she created in association with Horacio Nazar for the “evolution of the city.” This was to be a part of an integrated plan for Argentina for the future as it shifted from a rural nation to one of modern cities. The plan incorporated the key elements of urban planning such as roads, parks, avenues, built areas, etc. The plan was presented with illustrations of graphs, photographs, diagrams and operational sequence to establish a link between historical data and the "pro-positivists". This format of the city planning was also part of the document prepared between 1948 and 1949 titled Estudio del Plan de Buenos Aires in which Fulvia was involved.

Villa worked with several leading architects, including Odilia Suárez, in 1959 to create the Regulatory Organization Plan of the City of Buenos Aires. In 1962, she served as an advisor to Baliero Horacio and Carmen Cordova on the design for the Park City Cemetery of Mar del Plata. She evaluated the development of Entre Ríos Province and in 1978, presented her study to the Secretariat of Urban Planning. In addition to her design work, villa was a chair holder at the architectural school and taught at the National University of La Plata throughout the 1950s.

== Bibliography ==
- Healey, Mark A. (2011). The Ruins of the New Argentina: Peronism and the Remaking of San Juan After the 1944 Earthquake. Durham, North Carolina: Duke University Press. ISBN 978-0-8223-4905-1.
- Stiftel, Bruce; Watson, Vanessa; Acselrad, Henri (2006). Dialogues in Urban and Regional Planning 2. Routledge. ISBN 1-134-14249-8.
