= Crash (Charli XCX album) =

- Standard cover

Studio album by Charli XCX
- Released: 18 March 2022
- Recorded: 2021
- Genres: Dance-pop; synth-pop
- Length: 33:46
- Labels: Asylum; Atlantic; Warner UK
- Producers: George Daniel; A. G. Cook; Lotus IV; Deaton Chris Anthony; Oscar Holter; Digital Farm Animals; Ian Kirkpatrick; Justin Raisen; Sadpony; Ariel Rechtshaid; Daniel Lopatin; Mike Wise; Dopamine

Charli XCX chronology
| How I'm Feeling Now (2020) | Crash (2022) | Bottoms (2023) |

Singles from Crash
- 1. "Good Ones" Released: 2 September 2021; 2. "New Shapes" Released: 4 November 2021; 3. "Beg for You" Released: 27 January 2022; 4. "Baby" Released: 1 March 2022; 5. "Every Rule" Released: 14 March 2022; 6. "Used to Know Me" Released: 17 March 2022

Crash is the fifth studio album by British singer Charli XCX, released on 18 March 2022, by Asylum and Atlantic Records. It was her last album to be released under her record contract with Asylum Records. Charli XCX announced the album title, release date, and artwork on 4 November 2021. Her website was also updated with information about the album's supporting 2022 tour. The album was preceded by the singles "Good Ones", "New Shapes" (featuring Christine and the Queens and Caroline Polachek), "Beg for You" (featuring Rina Sawayama), "Baby", "Every Rule" and "Used to Know Me".

Whereas Charli XCX's prior work was known for its experimental, hyperpop production, Crash features a more conventional dance-pop sound, with Charli XCX dubbing it her "major label sell-out" record. Desiring to play a satirical role, she performed songs written for her by other writers and used an A&R executive for the first time in her career. Songs from the album include elements of pop music of the 1980s and 1990s, and Charli XCX has cited Janet Jackson, among others, as a musical influence for the album. David Cronenberg's 1996 film of the same name inspired aesthetic themes of the album, including the title and artwork.

Crash received generally positive reviews from music critics and became Charli XCX's most commercially successful album until the release of her next album, Brat (2024). It topped the charts in Australia, Ireland and the United Kingdom. It also became her first top-ten album in New Zealand and the United States.

== Background and recording ==
In September 2019, Charli XCX released her third studio album, Charli, to critical acclaim. A previous version of her third album was originally slated for a 2017 release, although Charli XCX later decided to scrap that project following most of its demo tracks being leaked on the Internet. Following the release of Charli, she explained in an interview with music magazine The Fader: "I'm not supposed to say this, I'm supposed to be like, in it, 'this album [Charli], stream it, buy it', but I'm like, already thinking about the next one, it's done, I'm onto the next level". In November, she stated that her current plans for the next year included the creation of two new albums.

In March 2020, due to the COVID-19 pandemic, recording sessions for the album were cancelled. On 6 April, Charli announced through a public Zoom call with fans that she would be working on a new album in self-isolation, with the tentative title How I'm Feeling Now. Charli XCX decided to postpone Crash recording sessions, then only known loosely as the "Janet album", and began working on a new fourth studio album spur of the moment. Work on this album began in Charli XCX’s home on 3 April and continued until the album's release date of 15 May.

== Composition ==
Conceived around Charli XCX's self-described "major label sell-out" persona, Crash abandons much of the experimental and hyperpop production of her previous work in favour of a more conventional dance-pop, 1980s synth-pop, and power pop sounds. In keeping with the concept, she intentionally recorded material written by other songwriters and collaborated with an A&R executive for the first time in her career. Crash incorporates elements of pop-funk, dream pop, Eurodance, disco, nu-disco, Italo disco, and post-Internet-themed glitch.

Charli XCX has listed Janet Jackson, Cameo, Sister Sledge, Serge Gainsbourg, Steve Vai, Black Eyed Peas, Charlie Puth, Cyndi Lauper, Rick James, Taylor Dayne, Boy Meets Girl, and Belinda Carlisle as Crash's musical inspirations. Featured artists on the album include Christine and the Queens and Caroline Polachek on "New Shapes", as well as Rina Sawayama on "Beg for You". Producers on the album include Oscar Holter, and Lotus IV and Deaton Chris Anthony, on the singles "Good Ones" and "New Shapes", respectively. A. G. Cook, George Daniel, Digital Farm Animals, Ian Kirkpatrick, Jason Evigan, Justin Raisen, Ariel Rechtshaid, Ilya Salmanzadeh, Oneohtrix Point Never, Jon Shave, and Mike Wise have also been revealed to have produced other tracks on the album.

Album opener "Crash" is a new jack swing song with hard funk drums. "Good Ones" explores electropop and synthwave, and "New Shapes" continues the album's 1980s synth-pop sound, while adding indie pop and electro-funk into the mix. She sampled Europop songs "Show Me Love" and "Cry for You" on "Used to Know Me" and "Beg for You", respectively, in an effort to strike a balance between nostalgia and futurism. "Beg for You" additionally is a UK garage song that evokes 2000s bubblegum and 1990s house. "Baby" is a post-disco, dance-pop, and pop-funk song with new jack swing elements reminiscent of Janet Jackson's Control (1986) and replicates the electro-funk of Cameo. "Lightning" is a techno-pop song with flamenco flourishes, while "Yuck" fuses a 1970s funk and boogie baseline with disco and contemporary synths. "Selfish Girl" was dubbed "Dua Lipa-style dance fantasia" by Paper's Shaad D'Souza.

=== Themes ===
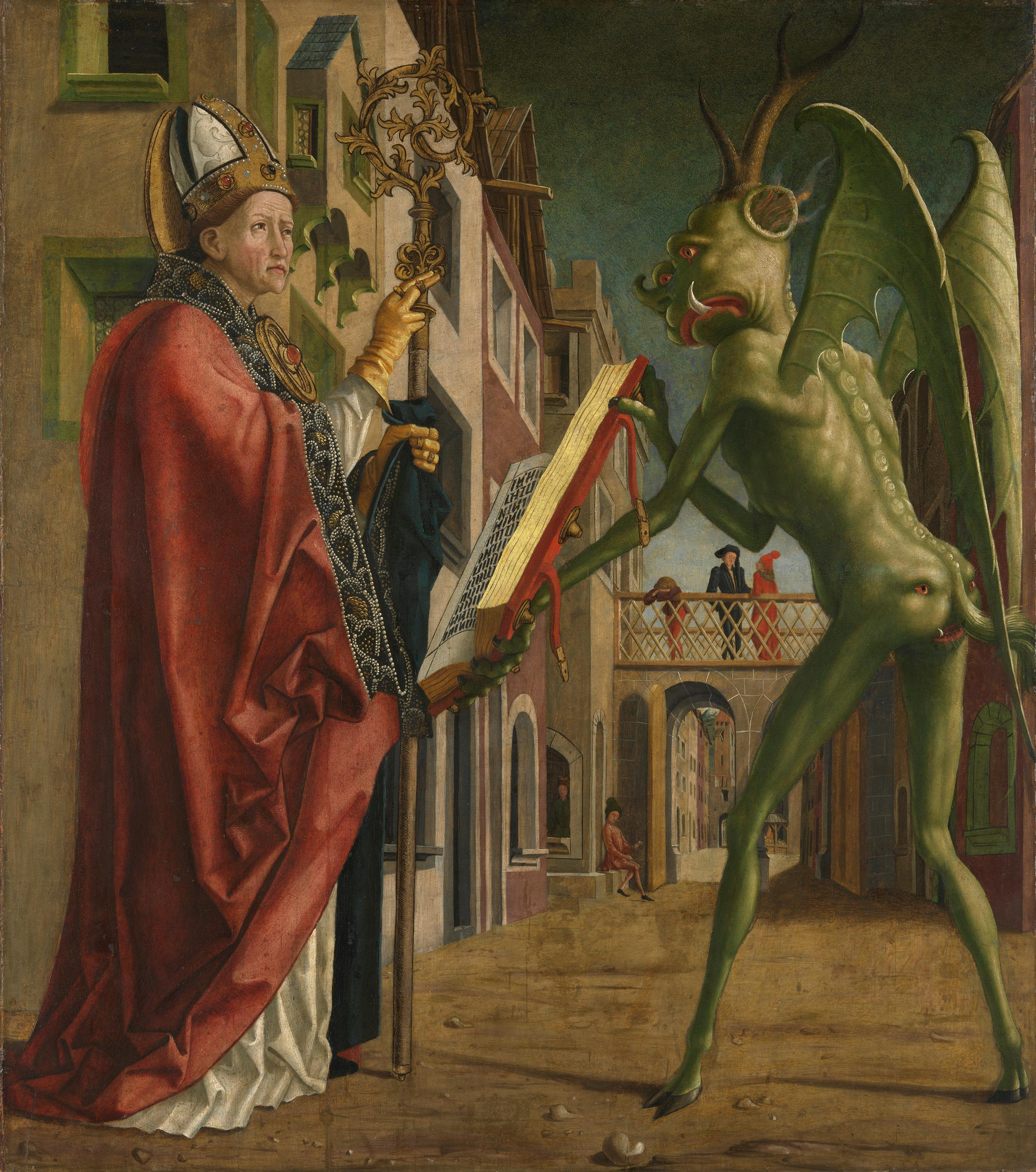
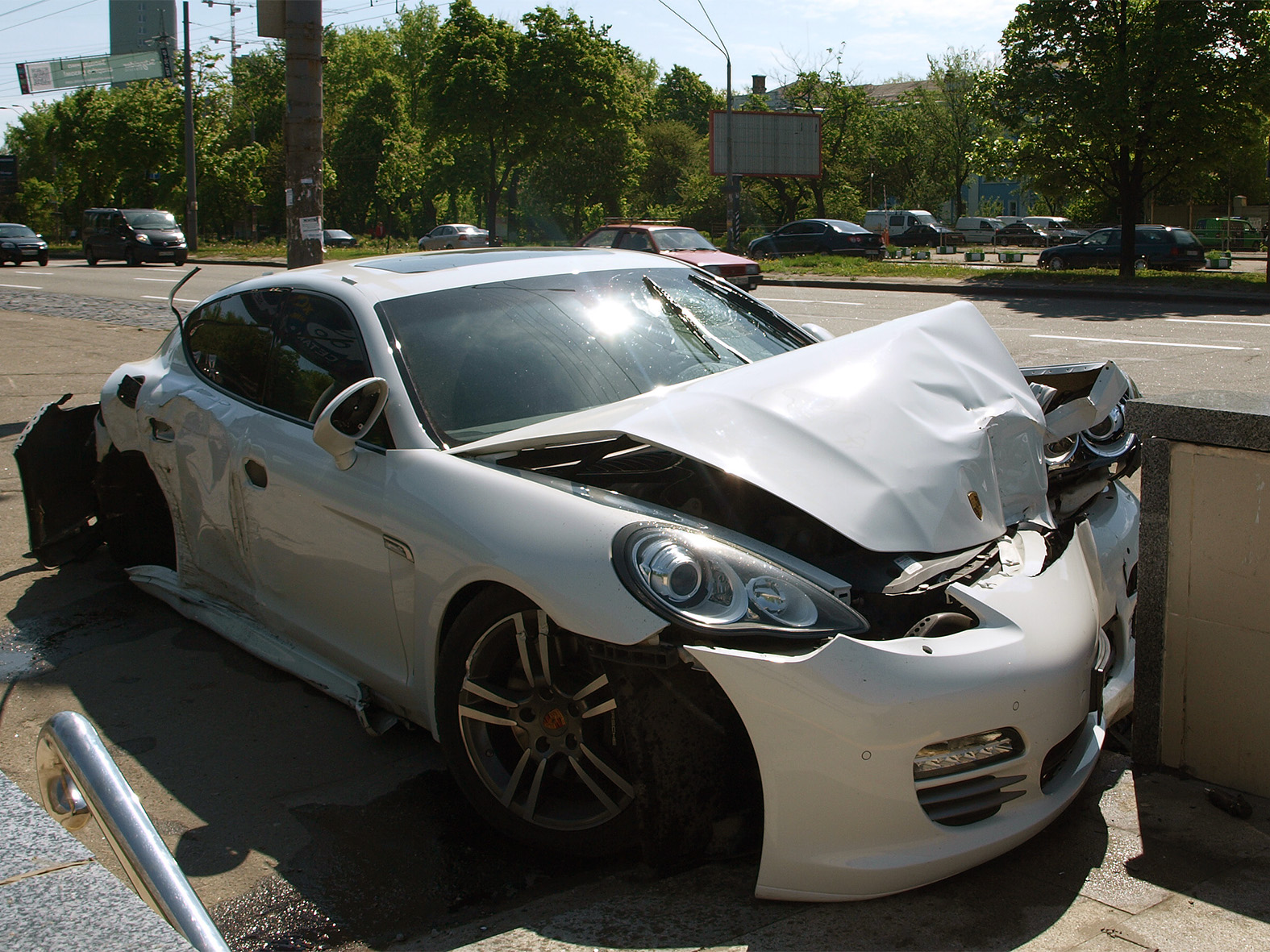
Crash's visual aesthetic combines themes of "deal-with-the-devil" and "selling your soul" (left) with imagery of automobiles and car crashes (right) inspired by David Cronenberg's Crash.

From as early as May 2021, Charli XCX took on an evil, demonic or soulless persona while teasing and promoting Crash, so as to play into a deal-with-the-devil idea. George Griffiths of the Official Charts compared the concept to Marina and the Diamonds's Electra Heart (2012). According to Charli XCX, visuals for the album include "femme fatale powers" and a multitude of "dark spells and curses", while depicting her as simultaneously "alive but injured" and in a position of dominance atop the crashed car. Various publications found references to the David Cronenberg films, mainly the 1996 film of the same name and Videodrome, the former of which is also an aesthetic inspiration for the album.

Charli XCX stated that references to Cronenberg's Crash were inevitable because of the album's title. She explained that the record explored a heightened, "vampiric" version of herself through themes of sexuality, danger, and the idea of "selling your soul", which she felt echoed the novel's and film's portrayal of characters pursuing extreme experiences to achieve intimacy and desire. In a review of the album, Austin Saalman of Under the Radar similarly drew comparisons to J. G. Ballard's 1973 novel Crash and Cronenberg's 1996 film adaptation, arguing that the album's artwork and production evoke their shared themes of technology, violence, sexuality, and the fusion of the human body with machinery.

In a 2024 interview with The Face, Charli XCX stated that, with Crash, she had set out to make a commercially viable record and that she was sick of the "vanilla palatable flatness" in the pop landscape at that moment. She admitted that, "There were songs on Crash that I would never listen to", picking out "Yuck" as an example; "I needed to switch after Crash – I wasn't born to do radio liners. That's not who I am at all."

== Release and promotion ==
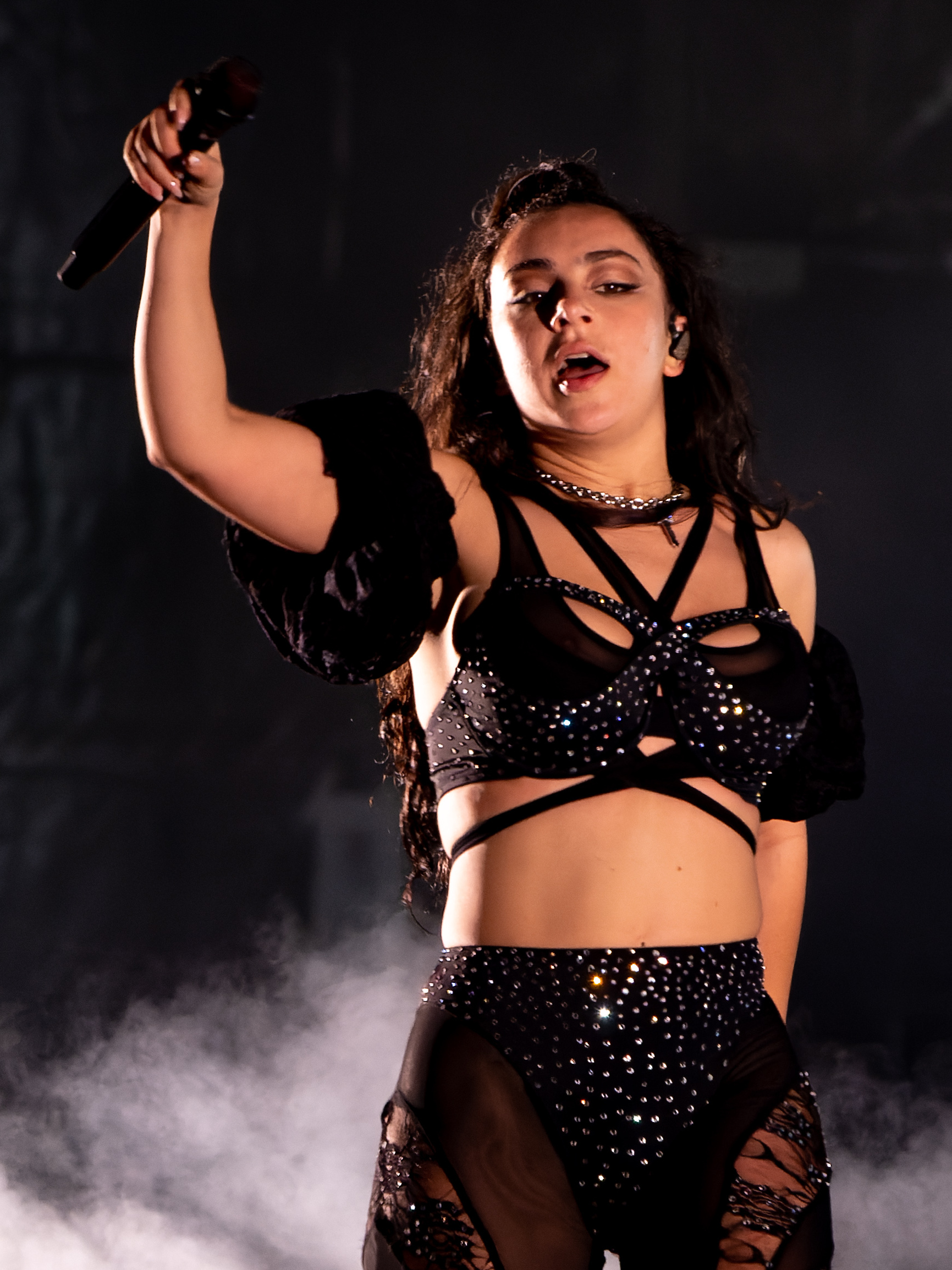
Charli XCX performing on Crash: The Live Tour in 2022

On 19 March 2021, Charli XCX debuted new songs for the first time on a Bandsintown virtual show, which would become commonly known amongst fans as "What You Want" and "Don't Think Twice"—later confirmed to be "New Shapes" and "Twice", respectively. On 1 November, she revealed the collaborators whom she would be working with on the album: Lotus IV, Christine and the Queens, Caroline Polachek, Oscar Holter, Digital Farm Animals, Rina Sawayama, Ian Kirkpatrick, Jason Evigan, Justin Raisen, SadPony, Ariel Rechtshaid, Ilya, Oneohtrix Point Never, Mike Wise, and Jon Shave.

Crash was formally announced on 4 November—an hour before the release of the second song—on all of Charli XCX's social media, along with the announcement of a 37-date tour titled Crash: The Live Tour, across North America and Europe and a link to pre-save the album. On 21 February 2022, Charli XCX announced that a deluxe edition would be released the same week as the standard album. However, the deluxe edition was released a week later than the standard one, on 25 March.

The liner notes of Crash dedicate it to Sophie, a friend and collaborator of Charli XCX who died in early 2021 and had produced a number of tracks for Charli including the entirety of her 2016 extended play (EP), Vroom Vroom, as well as the majority of her scrapped third studio album. On 23 June, she participated in the Doritos event "Live from the Upside Down" in collaboration with the Netflix series Stranger Things. On 14 December, she made a live performance on Discord.

=== Singles ===
"Good Ones" was released as Crash's lead single on 2 September 2021. Its music video, directed by Hannah Lux Davis and filmed in Mexico, was released the same day as the song. "New Shapes" was released on 4 November as the second single, featuring Christine and the Queens and Caroline Polachek. The music video was released a few days after. Charli XCX was set to appear on the ninth episode of Saturday Night Live's 47th season alongside Christine and the Queens and Polachek to promote the singles, but the performances were cancelled due to the rise of the coronavirus Omicron variant in New York City. The performance was later rescheduled to 5 March 2022.

"Beg for You", a collaboration with Rina Sawayama, was released on 27 January 2022, as the third single. It samples September's 2006 single "Cry for You", as well as the song "Don't Cry" by Belgian dance group Milk Inc. "Baby" was released on 1 March, as the fourth single. On 14 March, "Every Rule" was released, followed by "Used to Know Me" on 17 March.

== Critical reception ==
Professional ratings
Aggregate scores
| Source | Rating |
|---|---|
| AnyDecentMusic? | 7.6/10 |
| Metacritic | 79/100 |
Review scores
| Source | Rating |
| AllMusic | 4/5 stars |
| Clash | 7/10 |
| DIY | 4.5/5 stars |
| The Guardian | 3/5 stars |
| The Independent | 5/5 stars |
| The Line of Best Fit | 9/10 |
| NME | 4/5 stars |
| Pitchfork | 8.0/10 |
| Rolling Stone | 3.5/5 stars |
| Slant | 3.5/5 stars |

Crash received "generally favorable reviews" according to Metacritic, which assigned it an average score of 79 based on 21 reviews.

Writing for Clash, Joe Rivers considered it to be a decidedly mixed album, "but it does demonstrate that, whatever her motivations and mindset, Charli XCX is an artist we should treasure. Even when she's not at her best, she displays enough nous and melody to stand head and shoulders above practically all her rivals". Elly Watson from DIY gave the album 4.5 out of 5 stars and wrote that it "may be closing a chapter for Charli but it is in no way a swan song [...] instead, she once again explores new ventures, crafting a pop album that celebrates the old classics as well as the new, and cements her status as a true pop trailblazer". Helen Brown on a five-out-of-five stars review for The Independent said that Crash is "the biggest, plushest, most mainstream release to date from the shy Essex music nerd turned hot LA diva. And while some fans may miss the 29-year-old's quirkier sonic experiments, there's no denying Charlotte Aitchison's ability to pump out enough relentlessly solid and sexy hooks to secure herself a place at pop's top table... or dancing on top of it." For Pitchfork, Owen Myers opined that "Despite a couple of slightly weaker moments (oddly, the album's lead singles), Crash is Charli's best full-length project since Pop 2, a canny embrace of modern and vintage pop styles by one of its most sincere students. It sets a bar for creative mainstream pop: the ruthless, intoxicating dream factory that can chew you up and spit you out and leave you coming back for more."

El Hunt, writing for NME, says that, "At times, Crash eases off the throttle slightly – the interpolation of 'Show Me Love' on 'Used to Know Me' is infectious, if slightly too straightforward, while smouldering ballads 'Move Me' and 'Every Rule' could do with more of the skewed hints of unfamiliarity found in spades elsewhere. These are minor gripes, though, and by the time those synthesised strings whirr into life on the jagged pop-funk track 'Baby' they're easy enough to overlook" while adding that "One emotion that her music will never evoke is boredom, and even when her sights are trained on infiltrating mainstream pop, she's still an artist with a knack for surprising. If Crash really does mark the death of Charli XCX as a major label artist – what a way to go." Fellow critic Tom Hull regarded the production as major and "in some ways the top of her game", while concluding that the album ultimately excels with the "delirious" "Used to Know Me".

Reviewing for Paste, Eric Bennett writes that, "When Charli achieves the perfect confluence of what she loves about pop music, and what we love about her music, it soars, creating some of her finest material to date. But when that balance is not achieved, the songs can feel generic or reductive – two words that have never applied to Charli XCX before. One must commend Charli on taking such a big swing: When you've become known for taking risks, the only way you can change things up is by playing it safe." In a mixed review for The Guardian, Alexis Petridis writes that "Not only does Crash not work – or at least not entirely – it leaves you wondering about its author's motivations. For all the messaging around it, it sometimes feels less like a smart concept than a shrug; the work of an artist seeing out a fraught five-album major label deal with a half-hearted 'whatever'. If there's a saving grace here, it's that the mercurial XCX – now a free agent – will doubtless return with something more interesting sooner rather than later."

In 2024, The Independent ranked Crash number eight on their list of the 20 most underrated albums ever, with Roisin O'Connor pointing out that "critics (and fans) tend to compare it unfavourably to the experimental alt-pop of her neon-green masterpiece" Brat, and stating that it had proved Charli XCX's "innate understanding of what makes a brilliant pop record".

=== Accolades ===
Upon release, Crash has been named by several magazines as one of the best albums of 2022. It was Charli XCX's best-selling record until Brat, being one of the UK's best-selling vinyl and cassette records.

List of year-end rankings
| Publication | List | Rank | Ref. |
|---|---|---|---|
| Rolling Stone | The 100 Best Albums of 2022 | 23 | |
| Loud and Quiet | Albums of the Year 2022 | 4 | |
| The Line of Best Fit | The Best Albums of 2022 Ranked | 17 | |
| Vulture | The Best Albums of 2022 (So Far) | —N/a | |
| The Forty-Five | Albums of the Year 2022 | 20 | |
| Pitchfork | The 50 Best Albums of 2022 | 19 | |
| NME | NME's 50 Best Albums of 2022 | 13 | |
| DIY | DIY's Albums of 2022 | 3 | |
| Nylon | Nylon's favorite albums of 2022 | —N/a | |
| Billboard | The 50 Best Albums of 2022: Staff List | 17 | |
| Slant Magazine | The 50 Best Albums of 2022 | 24 | |
| The Fader | The 50 Best Albums of 2022 | 47 | |
| Esquire | The 25 Best Albums of 2022 | —N/a | |
| The Independent | The Best Albums of 2022 | 5 | |
| Gorilla vs. Bear | Gorilla vs. Bear's Albums of 2022 | 47 | |
| Mondo Sonoro | Los 50 mejores discos internacionales de 2022 | 14 | |
| PopMatters | The 80 Best Albums of 2022 | 54 | |
| Dazed | The 20 Best Albums of 2022 | 5 | |
| Insider | The Best Albums of 2022 | 15 | |
| Gigwise | Best Albums of 2022 | 8 | |
| The Guardian | The 50 Best Albums of 2022 | 4 | |
| Under the Radar | Under the Radar's Top 100 Albums of 2022 Part 1 | 33 | |
| The Vinyl Factory | Our Favourite Albums of 2022 | —N/a | |
| Ones to Watch | The 25 Best Albums of 2022 | 8 | |

== Commercial performance ==
Crash debuted at number one on the UK Albums Chart with 16,117 units, becoming her first album to top the chart. In Ireland, the album opened at number one on Irish Albums Chart, also scoring her first album to reach the top. In Australia, Crash also debuted at number one on ARIA Albums Chart, becoming her second top-ten entry and the first to reach the top spot. The same week, Crash was also the best-selling album on vinyl. Crash debuted at number one on the Scottish Albums Chart.

In the United States, Crash debuted at number seven on the Billboard 200 with 31,500 equivalent album units (19,000 pure and 15.6 million on-demand official streams), becoming her highest-charting album at the time until her follow-up release, Brat, debuted at number three. It is also her first top-ten album on the chart. In Germany, the album opened at number 19 on Offizielle Deutsche Charts, becoming her first top-20 entry in the country. In Canada, Crash opened at number 16 on Billboard Canadian Albums, becoming her first top-20 entry. In the Netherlands, Crash debuted at number 16 on the Dutch Album Top 100, making it her highest entry on the chart.

== Track listing ==
Standard edition
| No. | Title | Writer(s) | Producer(s) | Length |
|---|---|---|---|---|
| 1. | "Crash" | Charlotte Aitchison; George Daniel; Alexander Guy Cook; Waylon Rector | Daniel; A. G. Cook | 2:09 |
| 2. | "New Shapes" (featuring Christine and the Queens and Caroline Polachek) | Aitchison; Linus Wiklund; Noonie Bao; Deaton Chris Anthony; Héloïse Letissier; Polachek | Lotus IV; Anthony | 3:20 |
| 3. | "Good Ones" | Aitchison; Mattias Larsson; Robin Fredriksson; Oscar Holter; Bao; Caroline Ailin | Holter | 2:16 |
| 4. | "Constant Repeat" | Aitchison; Bao; Wiklund | Lotus IV | 3:09 |
| 5. | "Beg for You" (featuring Rina Sawayama) | Aitchison; Sawayama; Rollo; Nicholas Gale; Sorana; Alexander Soifer; Jonas von der Berg^{[A]}; Niklas von der Berg^{[A]}; Anoo Bhagavan^{[A]} | Digital Farm Animals | 2:48 |
| 6. | "Move Me" | Aitchison; Amy Allen; Jason Evigan; Ian Kirkpatrick | Kirkpatrick; Evigan^{[a]} | 2:27 |
| 7. | "Baby" | Aitchison; Jeremiah Raisen; Justin Raisen | Justin Raisen; Sadpony | 2:39 |
| 8. | "Lightning" | Aitchison; Rami Yacoub; Ilya Salmanzadeh; Madison Love | Ariel Rechtshaid | 3:57 |
| 9. | "Every Rule" | Aitchison; Cook | Cook; Daniel Lopatin; Matt Cohn^{[a]} | 3:03 |
| 10. | "Yuck" | Aitchison; Michael Joseph Wise; Elizabeth Lowell Boland; Megan Bülow; Nathan Ferraro | Wise | 2:18 |
| 11. | "Used to Know Me" | Aitchison; Bao; Dylan Brady; Wiklund; Fred McFarlane^{[B]}; Allen George^{[B]} | Dopamine (Darryl Reid and Jon Shave) | 2:25 |
| 12. | "Twice" | Aitchison; Bao; Wiklund | Lotus IV | 3:14 |
| Total length: | | | | 33:46 |

Digital deluxe edition
| No. | Title | Writer(s) | Producer(s) | Length |
|---|---|---|---|---|
| 13. | "Selfish Girl" | Aitchison; Anthony; Wiklund; Bao | Lotus IV; Daniel; Anthony^{[a]} | 3:14 |
| 14. | "How Can I Not Know What I Need Right Now" | Aitchison; Daniel; James Samuel Harris III^{[C]}; Terry Lewis^{[C]} | Daniel | 2:37 |
| 15. | "Sorry If I Hurt You" | Andrew Wyatt; Aitchison; Anthony; Wiklund; Bao | Lotus IV; Anthony^{[a]} | 2:41 |
| 16. | "What You Think About Me" | Cook; Aitchison; Rector | Cook | 3:04 |
| Total length: | | | | 45:28 |

=== Notes ===
- ^{^[a]} signifies an additional producer.
- ^{^[A]} "Beg for You" contains samples of "Don't Cry" by Milk Inc. and "Cry for You" by September.
- ^{^[B]} "Used to Know Me" contains samples of "Show Me Love" by Robin S.
- ^{^[C]} "How Can I Not Know What I Need Right Now" contains samples of "Saturday Love" by Cherrelle and Alexander O'Neal.

== Personnel ==
=== Musicians and vocals ===
- Charli XCX – vocals
- George Daniel – vocal chops, drums, bass programming (track 1), synth and keys programming (tracks 1, 13–14)
- Waylon Rector – guitar (tracks 1, 16)
- Christine and the Queens – vocals (track 2)
- Caroline Polachek – vocals (track 2)
- Deaton Chris Anthony – additional vocals, synths, keyboard programming, bass programming, instrumentation (track 2), drum programming (tracks 2, 13, 15)
- Lotus IV – drum programming, instrumentation (tracks 2, 4, 12), keyboard programming, bass programming (tracks 2, 4, 12, 15)
- Caroline Ailin – background vocals (track 3)
- Rina Sawayama – vocals (track 5)
- Sorana – additional backing vocals (track 5)
- Ariel Rechtshaid – drum programming, synths, nylon guitar (track 8)
- Noonie Bao – percussion (track 15)

=== Technical ===
- A. G. Cook – programming, synths (tracks 1, 9, 16), engineering (tracks 1, 9, 16)
- Geoff Swan – mixing (tracks 1–2, 4, 7–10, 12–13, 15–16)
- Niko Battistini – mix assistance (tracks 1–2, 4, 7–10, 12–13, 15–16)
- Matt Cahill – mix assistance (tracks 1–2, 4, 7–10, 12–13, 15–16)
- Randy Merrill – mastering
- Serban Ghenea – mixing (track 3)
- Bryce Bordone – mix assistance (track 3)
- Lionel Crasta – bridge vocals engineering (track 3)
- John Hanes – engineering (track 3)
- Oscar Holter – programming, drums, bass, keys (track 3), engineering (track 3)
- Thomas Warren – engineering (track 3, 11)
- Kevin Grainger – mixing (track 5, 11)
- Alexander Soifer – additional vocal production (track 5)
- Ben Hogarth – vocal engineering (track 5)
- Jonathan Gilmore – vocal production and engineering for Rina Sawayama (track 5)
- Anthony Tucci Jr. – Charli vocal recording (track 5)
- Manny Marroquin – mixing (track 6)
- Ian Kirkpatrick – recording (track 6)
- Ainjel Emme – assistant engineering (track 7)
- Anthony Paul Lopez – engineering (track 7)
- Justin Raisen – engineering (track 7), guitar, FX (track 7)
- Sadpony – synths, bass, drum programming (track 7), engineering (track 7)
- Rami Yacoub – vocal recording (track 8)
- Matt DiMona – engineering (track 8)
- Matt Cohn – engineering (track 9)
- Jon Shave – keyboards, programming (track 11), engineering (track 11)
- Darryl Reid – keyboards, programming (track 11), engineering (track 11)
- Lou Carrao – engineering (tracks 13–14)
- Oli Jacobs – mixing (tracks 14–15)

== Charts ==
Chart performance
| Chart (2022) | Peak position |
|---|---|
| Australian Albums (ARIA) | 1 |
| Austrian Albums (Ö3 Austria) | 9 |
| Belgian Albums (Ultratop Flanders) | 11 |
| Belgian Albums (Ultratop Wallonia) | 19 |
| Canadian Albums (Billboard) | 16 |
| Croatian International Albums (HDU) | 8 |
| Dutch Albums (Album Top 100) | 16 |
| Finnish Albums (Suomen virallinen lista) | 29 |
| French Albums (SNEP) | 53 |
| German Albums (Offizielle Top 100) | 19 |
| Greek Albums (IFPI) | 15 |
| Hungarian Albums (MAHASZ) | 8 |
| Irish Albums (Official Charts) | 1 |
| Italian Albums (FIMI) | 95 |
| Japanese Download Albums (Billboard Japan) | 48 |
| Lithuanian Albums (AGATA) | 36 |
| New Zealand Albums (RMNZ) | 2 |
| Portuguese Albums (AFP) | 26 |
| Scottish Albums (Official Charts) | 1 |
| Spanish Albums (Promusicae) | 12 |
| Swiss Albums (Schweizer Hitparade) | 19 |
| UK Albums (Official Charts) | 1 |
| US Billboard 200 | 7 |

== Certifications ==
Certifications and sales
| Region | Certification | Certified units/sales |
|---|---|---|
| United Kingdom (BPI) | Silver | 80,600 (Note: Total sales figure as of July 2026) |
^{‡} Sales+streaming figures based on certification alone.

== Release history ==
Release dates and formats
| Region | Date | Format(s) | Version | Label | Ref. |
|---|---|---|---|---|---|
| Various | 18 March 2022 | Cassette; CD; digital download; streaming; LP | Standard | Asylum; Warner | |
| Various | 25 March 2022 | Digital download; streaming | Deluxe | Asylum; Warner | |
| Japan | 30 March 2022 | CD | Standard | Warner | |

== See also ==
- List of number-one albums of 2022 (Australia)
- List of number-one albums of 2022 (Ireland)
- List of number-one albums of 2022 (Scotland)
- List of UK Albums Chart number ones of the 2020s
