= Saturday Night Live season 47 =

Season of American television series

Saturday Night Live
- Season 47
- No. of episodes: 21

Release
- Original network: NBC
- Original release: October 2, 2021 – May 21, 2022

Season chronology
- ← Previous season 46 Next → season 48

The forty-seventh season of the NBC sketch comedy series Saturday Night Live premiered on October 2, 2021, during the 2021–22 television season with host Owen Wilson and musical guest Kacey Musgraves, and concluded on May 21, 2022 with host Natasha Lyonne and musical guest Japanese Breakfast. For the first time, the season's first five episodes and the remainder from episode ten onward were live-streamed on the streaming service Peacock in addition to its coast-to-coast live television broadcast.

== Cast ==
Prior to the start of the season, longtime cast member Beck Bennett departed after spending eight seasons on the show since 2013. Featured player Lauren Holt, who had joined the show for the previous season, departed the show after the finale.

Three new featured players were added: comedic actor and filmmaker Aristotle Athari, impressionist and actor James Austin Johnson, and surrealist comedian Sarah Sherman. Chloe Fineman and Bowen Yang, who were both hired as featured players for season 45, were promoted to repertory status this season, while Andrew Dismukes and Punkie Johnson, both of whom were hired for season 46, remained as featured players. With 21 cast members, the cast for season 47 was the largest in the show's history.

Kate McKinnon did not appear in the first seven episodes of the season, as she was filming Joe vs. Carole. Cecily Strong was absent from the first three episodes of 2022 due to her appearance in the Off-Broadway revival of the one-woman play The Search for Signs of Intelligent Life in the Universe. Pete Davidson was absent from the thirteenth until the twentieth episode due to filming the movie The Home.

This was the final season for longtime cast members McKinnon (who had been with the show since 2012), Aidy Bryant (since 2012), Kyle Mooney (since 2013), Davidson (since 2014), Alex Moffat, Melissa Villaseñor, (both since 2016), Chris Redd (since 2017), and the only season for Athari.

This cast stayed on longer than usual (with an average of 8–10 years), compared to previous casts, and executive producer Lorne Michaels attributed this to the COVID-19 pandemic, since there was nowhere for the cast to go at the time, and that several of them would've left earlier had the pandemic not happened. Bryant and McKinnon have confirmed that this was the case for themselves specifically.

This was also the final season for longtime director Don Roy King, who had directed the show since 2006. King retired after the ninth episode, hosted by Paul Rudd, and was succeeded by Liz Patrick, a longtime director of The Ellen DeGeneres Show. In addition, longtime producer Lindsay Shookus, who had been with the show since 2002, left at the end of this season.

This season saw the deaths of four former cast members; on September 14, 2021, a month before the season began, former cast member and Weekend Update anchor Norm Macdonald died at the age of 61 after a nine-year battle with leukemia. Two months later, on November 6, former featured player from season 5 Peter Aykroyd died at the age of 65 from sepsis caused by an untreated abdominal hernia. Later in the season, on April 12, 2022, at the age of 67, season six cast member Gilbert Gottfried died after a long illness from a rare ventricular tachycardia disorder complicated by type II myotonic dystrophy. On May 6, short-lived season 11 cast member Dan Vitale died from heart disease at the age of 66.

=== Cast roster ===
**Repertory players**

- Aidy Bryant
- **Michael Che**
- Pete Davidson
- Mikey Day
- Chloe Fineman
- Heidi Gardner
- **Colin Jost**
- Kate McKinnon
- Alex Moffat
- Kyle Mooney
- Ego Nwodim
- Chris Redd
- Cecily Strong
- Kenan Thompson
- Melissa Villaseñor
- Bowen Yang

**Featured players**

- Aristotle Athari
- Andrew Dismukes
- James Austin Johnson
- Punkie Johnson
- Sarah Sherman

bold denotes "Weekend Update" anchor

== Writers ==
Prior to the start of the season, the show hired ten new writers: Mike DiCenzo, Billy Domineau, Alex English, Martin Herlihy, John Higgins, Vanessa Jackson, Tesha Kondrat, Ben Marshall, Jake Nordwind, and Ben Silva. Herlihy, Higgins, and Marshall performed sketches throughout the season as the comedy troupe Please Don't Destroy.

Anna Drezen, Michael Che, Colin Jost, and Kent Sublette remained as the show's head writers. Following the conclusion of first half of the season, Drezen (who joined the writing staff in 2016) left to focus on her show for Freeform. It was also the last season for writers Jasmine Pierce (who joined the writing staff in 2019) and Steven Castillo (who joined the writing staff in 2017). Castillo later returned to the show during season 49.

Alison Gates, who started writing for the show in 2018, was promoted to writing supervisor. Gates and fellow writing supervisor Streeter Seidell (who's been a writer on the show since 2014 and was promoted writing supervisor in 2017) joined Che, Jost, and Sublette as head writers beginning with the Ariana DeBose episode.

Beginning with the John Mulaney episode, three new writers were hired: Rosebud Baker, Clare O'Kane and Nicole Sun.

== Episodes ==
No. overall	No. in season	Host	Musical guest	Original release date	Live+Same Day Ratings/ Share
910	1	Owen Wilson	Kacey Musgraves	October 2, 2021	3.5
Kacey Musgraves performs "Justified" and "Camera Roll".; Musgraves performed "Justified" in the nude, wearing only a pair of boots, while seated on a stool cross-legged playing an acoustic guitar strategically placed with its strap across one shoulder, and her hair draped over the other shoulder. It was the first time in the history of the show that a musical guest performed nude on stage in front of the audience. The nudity was inspired by a scene in Forrest Gump in which Robin Wright's character performs in the nude. Musgraves' nudity was only confirmed two days after the episode aired. Her publicist said that "precautions" were taken to keep her covered from the studio audience before and after the performance.; Starting with this episode, James Austin Johnson portrays President Joe Biden in the cold open.; Owen's brothers Luke Wilson and Andrew Wilson appear during the monologue. Luke also appears as Mark Bezos in the pre-recorded "Star Trek: Ego Trip" sketch.; On Weekend Update, Pete Davidson wears a T-shirt with a picture of former SNL cast member and Update host Norm Macdonald who died on September 14. Jost and Che ended the segment with footage of Macdonald hosting Update as a tribute.; A picture of former NBC president and co-creator Herbert Schlosser, who died on August 6, was shown in silence before the good nights.; During the goodnights, Colin Jost held up a cue card saying "We'll miss you, Ken", in reference to retiring supervising producer Ken Aymong, and Aidy Bryant wore an IATSE shirt.; Aristotle Athari, James Austin Johnson, and Sarah Sherman's first episode as cast members.
911	2	Kim Kardashian West	Halsey	October 9, 2021	3.8
Halsey performs "I Am Not a Woman, I'm a God" and "Darling"; Lindsey Buckingham plays guitar and provides backup vocals for the performance of "Darling".; Halsey also portrays Kendall Jenner in "The People's Kourt" sketch.; Tyler Cameron, John Cena, Chace Crawford, Blake Griffin, Chris Rock, Amy Schumer, and Jesse Williams appear in "The Dream Guy" sketch.; Kris Jenner and Khloé Kardashian appear as themselves in the pre-recorded "The Switch" sketch and "The People's Kourt" live in studio.; Writer Streeter Seidell appears in the pre-recorded "The Switch" as Aidy Bryant's husband.; Writers Martin Herlihy, John Higgins, and Ben Marshall appear in the pre-recorded "Please Don't Destroy – Hard Seltzer" .; During the May 28, 2022 rerun, a photo of Ray Liotta, who died earlier in the week, was shown in silence after Update.
912	3	Rami Malek	Young Thug	October 16, 2021	3.4
Young Thug performs "Tick Tock" with Travis Barker on drums and "Love You More" with Barker, Nate Ruess, Gunna, and Jeff Bhasker.; Daniel Craig appears in the "Prince Audition" and "Angelo" sketches.; Country singer Big Wet appears in the pre-recorded "Squid Game" sketch, which is a parody of his song "Turn Up on the Weekend" with Branchez.; Writers Martin Herlihy, John Higgins, and Ben Marshall appear in the cut-for-time pre-recorded "Please Don't Destroy – Rami Wants a Treat".
913	4	Jason Sudeikis	Brandi Carlile	October 23, 2021	3.7
Brandi Carlile performs "Broken Horses" and "Right on Time".; Fred Armisen, Nicholas Braun, Oscar Isaac, and Emily Ratajkowski appear in the "What Up with That?" sketch.; With this episode, Colin Jost breaks Seth Meyers' record for most Weekend Update segments hosted.
914	5	Kieran Culkin	Ed Sheeran (Note: Sheeran performed despite having tested positive for COVID-19 thirteen days prior to show date. His performance was confirmed four days prior to show date after having been cleared of having the virus.)	November 6, 2021	4.89
Ed Sheeran performs "Shivers" and "Overpass Graffiti" and appears in "The Dionne Warwick Show".; Dionne Warwick appears in "The Dionne Warwick Show" sketch alongside Ego Nwodim's impression of her.; Tracy Morgan appears in the "Men's Bathroom" sketch.; Writers Martin Herlihy, John Higgins, and Ben Marshall appear in the pre-recorded "Please Don't Destroy – Calling Angie" sketch.
915	6	Jonathan Majors	Taylor Swift	November 13, 2021	4.97
Taylor Swift performs the ten minute version of "All Too Well (Taylor's Version)", with the accompanying short film of the same name (written and directed by Swift and starring Sadie Sink and Dylan O'Brien) playing on a screen behind her during the performance. Swift's performance is one of the longest in the show's history. She also appears in the pre-recorded "Please Don't Destroy – Three Sad Virgins".; Writers Martin Herlihy, John Higgins, and Ben Marshall appear in the pre-recorded "Please Don't Destroy – Three Sad Virgins".
916	7	Simu Liu	Saweetie	November 20, 2021	4.70
Saweetie performs a medley of "Tap In" and "Best Friend", and "Icy Chain".; Big Wet, Marc Cohn and Method Man (as well as YouTuber "Chris the Hobby Guy") appear in the pre-recorded "Walking in Staten" sketch, which is a parody of "Walking in Memphis" performed by Cohn.; Before the goodnights, a photo of former writer and featured player Peter Aykroyd, brother of original Not Ready for Primetime Player Dan Aykroyd, who died on November 6 is shown in silence.; Writers Martin Herlihy, John Higgins, and Ben Marshall appear in the cut-for-time pre-recorded "Please Don't Destroy – Touch Up".
917	8	Billie Eilish	Billie Eilish	December 11, 2021	5.16
Billie Eilish performs "Happier Than Ever" and "Male Fantasy". Her brother, Finneas O'Connell, accompanies her on guitar and backup vocals in both songs.; Finneas O'Connell also appears in the pre-recorded "TikTok Scrolling" and in the "Business Garden" sketch.; Kate McKinnon returns after being absent for the first seven episodes. She also introduces Eilish's second song.; Eilish's mother, Maggie Baird, appears in the opening monologue. Eilish's father, Patrick O'Connell, joins wife Baird to introduce Eilish's first song.; Miley Cyrus appears as herself in the "Christmas Card" sketch.; TikTok personality and SNL writer Jacob Kaplan appears in the pre-recorded "Kyle's Christmas" sketch.; Writers Martin Herlihy, John Higgins, and Ben Marshall appear in the cut-for-time pre-recorded "Please Don't Destroy – Future Selves" with actors George Aloi, James Ciccone, and Tim Hayes.; Eilish becomes the first SNL host born in the 21st century (she was born on December 18, 2001).
918	9	Paul Rudd	none (Note: Charli XCX was the scheduled musical act, but the rise of the COVID Omicron variant in New York City led to a limited cast and crew which meant her performances were dropped. However, she appeared in a pre-recorded sketch. She was rescheduled as a musical guest and performed in March 2022.)	December 18, 2021	5.15
Due to the rise of the Omicron variant in New York City, the show had a "limited cast and crew" and no audience; Kenan Thompson and Michael Che were the only current cast members on set. Most portions are pre-recorded.; The episode does not have a cold open, use a title sequence or the line "Live from New York, it's Saturday Night!" The cast is instead listed in the end credits.; Tom Hanks, Tina Fey, Steve Martin and Martin Short (the latter two pre-recorded) appear in the introduction to induct Rudd into the Five-Timers Club.; Planned appearances by Candice Bergen, Jimmy Fallon, and Jon Hamm were cancelled due to the new restrictions. In January, Fallon would reveal that he had tested positive for COVID-19 during this episode's production. Bergen, however, later made an appearance in the February 26, 2022 episode.; Charli XCX was due to perform "Good Ones" and "New Shapes" on this episode, but her performance was canceled due to the new restrictions. Christine and the Queens and Caroline Polachek were planned to perform the latter song with her. Charli would later reschedule her appearance for March 2022.; Charli does, however, appear in a pre-recorded music video spoof "The Christmas Socks".; Fey fills in for Colin Jost on "Update", as he also contracted COVID-19. It was done in front of the main stage in director's chairs rather than on the "Update" set, with Rudd, Hanks, and Thompson watching.; Some classic Christmas sketches are shown to make up for the lack of cast members; some sketches were introduced by Fey, Hanks, and Thompson. These include: "Dick in a Box" from the season 32 episode hosted by Justin Timberlake; "Santa and His Naughty Elves" from the season 41 episode hosted by Ryan Gosling; "The Global Warming Christmas Special" from the season 16 episode hosted by Hanks; "A Holiday Wish from Steve Martin" from the season 12 episode hosted by Chevy Chase, Martin, and Short; "Caleb and Monty" from the season 38 episode hosted by Short with musical guest Paul McCartney; "North Pole News Report" from the season 45 episode hosted by Eddie Murphy; "Now That's What I Call Christmas" from the season 39 episode hosted by Jimmy Fallon; "Christmastime for the Jews" from the season 31 episode hosted by Jack Black.; "Adult One Direction Fan" from the season 39 episode hosted by Rudd, while not a Christmas sketch, was also featured.; Don Roy King's final episode as director.
919	10	Ariana DeBose	Bleachers (Note: Bleachers substitutes for Roddy Ricch, whose scheduled musical performance was cancelled due to a COVID-19 exposure.)	January 15, 2022	5.05
Bleachers performs "How Dare You Want More" and "Chinatown".; Jack Antonoff's father Rick Antonoff plays acoustic guitar with the band on the first song. Claud plays keyboard and acoustic guitar on the former and latter, respectively, and Blu DeTiger plays bass on both songs.; When introducing Bleachers' second song, DeBose wears a T-shirt for Covenant House, a nonprofit organization for the homeless.; Freddie Gibbs appears in the cut-for-time pre-recorded "All on Me" sketch.; Liz Patrick's first episode as sole director.
920	11	Will Forte	Måneskin	January 22, 2022	4.80
Måneskin performs "Beggin'" and "I Wanna Be Your Slave".; Willem Dafoe (the host for the next episode), Lorne Michaels, and Kristen Wiig appear in the opening monologue.; Wiig also reprises her role as Vicki St. Elmo in "MacGruber" alongside Ryan Phillippe reprising his role as Dixon Piper from the film and TV series based on the sketches.; Wiig also reprises her role as Jackie Snad in the "Country Album" sketch.; Wiig also appears in the cut-for-time "Architect Presentation" sketch.; Before the good nights, a photo tribute is made to John Bowman, a writer on the show from 1988 to 1989, who died on New Year's Eve at 64 years old.; Writers Martin Herlihy, John Higgins, and Ben Marshall appear in the cut-for-time pre-recorded "Please Don't Destroy – New Personalities".
921	12	Willem Dafoe	Katy Perry	January 29, 2022	4.97
Katy Perry performs "When I'm Gone" with Alesso and an acoustic version of "Never Really Over".; Peyton Manning appears on Weekend Update.; Writers Martin Herlihy, John Higgins, and Ben Marshall appear in the pre-recorded "Please Don't Destroy – Martin's Friend" with actor Patrick Scott McDermott.; With this episode, Michael Che moves into second place for most Weekend Update segments hosted, surpassing Seth Meyers and behind Colin Jost.; After this episode Pete Davidson takes an extended absence that lasts until the season finale, he will continue to be credited.
922	13	John Mulaney	LCD Soundsystem	February 26, 2022	4.74
LCD Soundsystem performs "Thrills" and "Yr City's a Sucker" and appears in the "Subway Churro" sketch.; In the cold open, the Ukrainian Chorus Dumka of New York perform "Prayer for Ukraine" in response to the Russian invasion of Ukraine.; Writers Martin Herlihy, John Higgins and Ben Marshall appear in the pre-recorded "Please Don't Destroy – Good Variant" with Al Roker and Paul Rudd. Marshall appears during "Subway Churro", while Rudd appears during Mulaney's introduction to the Five-Timers Club.; Candice Bergen, Tina Fey, Elliott Gould, Steve Martin, Conan O'Brien and appear during Mulaney's introduction to the Five-Timers Club sketch.; Cecily Strong returns after not appearing during the previous three episodes.
923	14	Oscar Isaac	Charli XCX	March 5, 2022	4.42
Charli XCX performs "Beg for You" and "Baby" and appears in the pre-recorded "Meatballs" sketch.; Writer and TikTok personality Jacob Kaplan appears in the pre-recorded "Inventing Chloe" sketch.; As of this episode, Kenan Thompson has officially starred in over 1,500 sketches.
924	15	Zoë Kravitz	Rosalía	March 12, 2022	4.36
Rosalía performs "Chicken Teriyaki" and "La Fama".; Writer Alex English appears in the opening monologue as an audience member.; Writers Martin Herlihy, John Higgins and Ben Marshall appear in the pre-recorded "Please Don't Destroy – Cat Search" with Paul Dano.; Herlihy also appears in the "Wedding Speech" sketch.
925	16	Jerrod Carmichael	Gunna	April 2, 2022	4.65
Gunna performs "Banking on Me" and "Pushin P" with Future. He also appears in the pre-recorded "Short-Ass Movie" sketch.; Pete Davidson reappears during his extended absence in the pre-recorded "Short-Ass Movie" sketch.; Simon Rex appears during the pre-recorded Short-Ass Movies sketch.; After Weekend Update, a photo tribute is made to Foo Fighters drummer Taylor Hawkins, who died on March 25.; Writers Martin Herlihy, John Higgins, and Ben Marshall appear in the cut-for-time pre-recorded "Please Don't Destroy – Three Normal Goths".
926	17	Jake Gyllenhaal	Camila Cabello	April 9, 2022	4.85
Camila Cabello performs "Bam Bam" and "Psychofreak" with Willow.; Lorne Michaels makes a vocal cameo during the cut-for-time pre-recorded "Serious Night Live" sketch.; While introducing the first song, Gyllenhaal wears a T-shirt with the words Ramona & Gloria. These are the names of his sister Maggie Gyllenhaal's daughters.
927	18	Lizzo	Lizzo	April 16, 2022	4.53
Lizzo performs "About Damn Time" and "Special". She introduces herself for the first song.; Lizzo's mother Shari Johnson-Jefferson appears in the audience in the opening monologue and introduces her daughter's second performance.; Writers Martin Herlihy, John Higgins, and Ben Marshall appear in the pre-recorded "Please Don't Destroy - Lizzo Has Writer's Block".; After Weekend Update, a tribute card for season 6 cast member Gilbert Gottfried, who died earlier in the week, is shown.
928	19	Benedict Cumberbatch	Arcade Fire	May 7, 2022	4.50
Arcade Fire performs "Unconditional I (Lookout Kid)", "The Lightning I, II", and "End of the Empire II" (the latter during the closing credits).; Elizabeth Olsen appears in the pre-recorded "The Understudy" sketch.; During goodnights, Cumberbatch and several cast members wear T-shirts with the year 1973, referring to the year of the Roe v. Wade decision, and in protest of the leaked draft opinion from the Supreme Court indicating potential reversal.
929	20	Selena Gomez	Post Malone	May 14, 2022	4.40
Post Malone performs "Cooped Up" with Roddy Ricch and "Love/Hate Letter to Alcohol" with Fleet Foxes and appears in the pre-recorded "Intuition" and in "Baby Monitor" live in studio.; Steve Martin appears in the pre-recorded "American Inventors" sketch.
930	21	Natasha Lyonne	Japanese Breakfast	May 21, 2022	4.60
Japanese Breakfast performs "Be Sweet" and "Paprika", with Luna Li on the violin and keyboard for both performances. Michelle Zauner also appears in "Women's Commercial".; Fred Armisen and Maya Rudolph appear in the opening monologue and the cut-for-time "Cigarette Show" sketch. Armisen also appears in "Mr. Dooley" sketch.; Eminem appears in the cut-for-time pre-recorded "Forgot About Lorne" sketch, which parodies his song "Forgot About Dre".; Aristotle Athari, Aidy Bryant, Pete Davidson, Kate McKinnon, Alex Moffat, Kyle Mooney, Chris Redd and Melissa Villaseñor's final episode as cast members.

== Specials ==
Title	Original release date	US viewers (millions)
"SNL Thanksgiving Special"	November 24, 2021	3.14
A compilation of Thanksgiving-related sketches from past years.

== Reception ==
In January 2022, Matthew Gilbert of The Boston Globe wrote that he was "surprised with the mediocrity" of the season, suggesting that individual cast members did not have opportunities to stand out; he cited the high number of players compared to past seasons, the periodic absence of some cast members due to other commitments, and regular use of guest stars and cameo appearances in sketches as possible reasons.

Conversely, Michael Boyle of Slate praised the season's filmed sketches featuring the Please Don't Destroy troupe, writing, "The basic character dynamics should be familiar to anyone who's watched SNL before, but they're done with an efficiency that puts the rest of the show to shame."

New cast member James Austin Johnson and his impression of former U.S. President Donald Trump, which debuted on the show this season, received a positive reception from critics. Dennis Perkins of The A.V. Club wrote, "Johnson's Trump is as exact as advertised, and his Trump's discursively narcissistic screed is more comically illuminating than four full years of Alec Baldwin making funny Trump faces." Dan Spinelli of Mother Jones lauded the accuracy of Johnson's impression, writing, "Close your eyes and you'll think new cast member James Austin Johnson is the real thing. He nails the preening self-regard, the incessant need for attention, and the way Trump wields 'excuse me' almost as a verbal saber." Gilbert, however, criticized Johnson's impression of President Joe Biden and opined it was not as good as his version of Trump. Andy Hoglund at Entertainment Weekly concurs, citing Johnson's "commendable if slightly less transcendent work as" the president.

Another new cast member, Sarah Sherman, received positive reviews from the entertainment press for adapting her unusual and surreal comedy style to the show. Luka Katic of Collider wrote, "Sherman certainly isn't the first unconventional comedian to be featured on SNL (i.e. Tim Robinson, Kyle Mooney, etc.). However, what makes her remarkable is her success in spite of that fact. Where actors like Robinson often felt they had to tone down their material for SNL, Sherman finds inventive alternative ways to channel her deranged sensibilities into the show." Jesse Hassenger of Vulture listed Sherman's "Meatballs" sketch from the Oscar Isaac/Charli XCX episode as one of the best of the season, writing "In a crowded season, it was especially refreshing to come upon a sketch that feels like such a clear expression of its star's sensibilities."
