= Kurchan =

Kurchan is a surname. Notable people with the surname include:

- Jorge Kurchan (born 1959), Argentine physicist
- Juan Kurchan (1913–1972), Argentine architect
