= Butterfly chair =

Type of chair

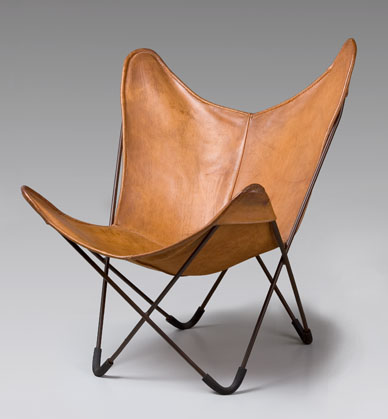
BKF Chair

The butterfly chair, also known as a BKF chair or Hardoy chair, is a style of chair featuring a metal frame and a large sling hung from the frame's highest points, creating a suspended seat. The frame of the chair is generally painted black. The sling was originally leather, but can also be made from canvas or other materials. The design is popular for portable recreational seating.

== History ==
The Butterfly chair was designed in Buenos Aires, Argentina, in 1938 by the architects Antonio Bonet, Juan Kurchan and Jorge Ferrari Hardoy, who were working with Le Corbusier's studio, and who formed the architectural collective Grupo Austral in Buenos Aires. The chair was developed for an apartment building they designed in Buenos Aires.

On March 6, 1940, a picture of the chair appeared in the US publication Retailing Daily, where it was described as a "newly invented Argentine easy-chair ... for siesta sitting". On July 24, 1940, the chair was awarded the 2nd prize by the National Cultural Commission at the 3rd Salón de Artistas Decoradores exhibition in Argentina. Both the exhibition and the picture in Retailing Daily attracted the attention of the Museum of Modern Art in New York. At the request of the director of MoMA's Industrial Design Department, Edgar Kaufmann Jr., Hardoy sent three chairs to New York. One went to Fallingwater, Edgar Kaufmann Jr.'s home in Pennsylvania (designed by Frank Lloyd Wright), another went to MoMA, while the third probably went to Clifford Pascoe of Artek-Pascoe, Inc., New York.

The chair gets the name of BKF chair from the initials of its creators, "Bonet-Kurchan-Ferrari". It is also known as the Hardoy chair because an official letter from the firm attributed primary authorship of the design to Ferrari-Hardoy.

== Origins ==
The BKF chair is a revival of the Paragon chair (more recently known as the Tripolina chair), which was designed by Joseph Beverley Fenby and has been used as campaign furniture and camping furniture since the 1880s.

== Production ==
The chair was initially designed in Argentina. However, Edgar Kaufmann Jr. accurately predicted that it would become extremely popular in the US, calling it one of the "best efforts of modern chair design". In the early 1940s, it was produced in the US by Artek-Pascoe, Inc., New York. Production was slow due to wartime shortages of raw materials, including metal.

After the war, the US production rights were acquired by Hans Knoll, who had recognized its commercial potential in 1947 and added it to the Knoll line. The chair's commercial success led to a surge in unauthorized replicas. After losing a legal case for design infringement, Knoll ceased production in 1951.

Since then, versions of the butterfly chair have continued to be produced by many manufacturers from various countries.

In 2018, Knoll rereleased an 80th anniversary tribute to the Butterfly Chair.
