= Tripolina =

Folding chair

Italian tripolina, 1930s

The Tripolina is a folding chair made out of wood with metal swivel joints and animal hide. It was invented by Joseph B. Fenby and patented in 1877 in England and in 1881 in the United States, respectively.

After the Tripolina’s appearance at the Saint Louis trade show in 1904, the design was licensed to European manufacturers and to Gold Medal Inc. in Wisconsin, USA, a company that produced military, camping and resort furniture throughout the 20th century. In Europe, the Tripolina chair was produced before World War II, among others, by the firm of Viganò in Tripoli, Libya, for the expatriate Italian market as a camping chair of great stability in the sand and made from local wood and camel or cow hide. The Italian firm of Viganò clearly stamped their products on the rear of the hides with their large "Paolo Viganò Tripoli" oval seal. The hide is nowadays often replaced by canvas or other materials.

== Further inspirations ==
The design has inspired other chairs, the famous BKF Chair for instance, also known as Butterfly chair. It utilizes curved metal instead of wood for its structure, and the seat cover is composed of four separate pieces.
