= Baby (Charli XCX song) =

2022 single by Charli XCX

Single by Charli XCX

from the album Crash
- Released: 1 March 2022
- Recorded: January 2020
- Genre: Post-disco; dance-pop; funk-pop
- Length: 2:39
- Label: Asylum; Warner UK
- Songwriters: Charlotte Aitchison; Jeremiah Raisen; Justin Raisen
- Producers: Justin Raisen; SadPony

Charli XCX singles chronology
"Beg for You" (2022)	"Baby" (2022)	"Every Rule" (2022)

Music video
- "Baby" on YouTube

"Baby" is a song by British singer Charli XCX. It was released on 1 March 2022 as the fourth single from her fifth studio album Crash (2022). The track is an 1980s-inspired post-disco, dance-pop, and funk-pop track with new jack swing and electro-funk elements. It has received positive reviews for its catchiness and sultry production.

== Background and release ==
In an interview with Zane Lowe for Apple Music 1, Charli XCX revealed that this track was one of the first ones to be conceptualized for the album. She further stated "I was working on it with Justin Raisen, and we'd done a lot together for my first ever album, True Romance. So it kind of felt cyclical to go back and with him again on what is my final record in my deal with Atlantic."

Charli XCX revealed that "Baby" would be included on her fifth studio album, Crash on 4 November 2021, by playing a snippet of the song on a TikTok live. On 19 December, following the cancellation of her Saturday Night Live appearance due to the rise of Omicron variant cases in New York, Charli XCX shared another snippet of the song, showing herself dancing to the song with choreographers. The single was registered on Songfile on 25 December 25, with Justin Raisen and SadPony credited as the producers. She uploaded a snippet of the track with the caption "i'm thinking this next..." on February 1, 2022, following the release of Crash's third single "Beg for You".

Following the release of "Baby", Charli XCX responded to fan criticism on Twitter by calling one of her fans a "cunt". The tweet was swiftly deleted and she expressed regret for it, while later labeling it "iconic". In a 2024 interview with The Face, she attributed it to stress caused by SNL rehearsals.

== Music and concept ==
"Baby", much like "Good Ones" and "New Shapes", showcases a more mainstream sound than the singer's previous releases. It "leans further into the record's overall '80s disco vibes with sparkling synths and funky guitar riffs". The disco-fied tune was inspired by the new jack swing elements of Janet Jackson's seminal album Control as well as the electro-funk of Cameo.

She explained in her interview with Zane Lowe for Apple Music 1 that "obviously so much has changed, and this song, it was kind of the foundation of the vibe of the album. It's probably the most sexy song I've ever made. It's about sex and sexuality and having good sex and just feeling yourself essentially. I know that that's the tone. I knew that that was the tone I wanted to carry across for the entire record. This kind of hyper-sexualized, feminine power zone was where I was feeling myself going, and 'Baby' was the genesis of this."

== Reception ==
"Baby" has received positive reviews for its catchiness and sultry production.

=== Rankings ===
Year-end rankings
Publication	List	Rank	Ref.
Vulture	The Best Songs of 2022	—N/a	

== Music video ==
Along with the song, a music video directed by Imogene Strauss and Luke Orlando was released on March 2, 2022. Nathan Kim devised a dance routine for the video. In the video, Charli XCX runs through sensual choreography while flanked by a pair of look-alike backup dancers. She explained that she "wanted to challenge myself on the choreo for this song, which was really, really tough and I have so much respect for dancers, professional dancers, anyone who communicates emotion through dance. It is so hard and challenging, but so rewarding."

== Release history ==
Release dates and formats
Region	Date	Format	Label	Ref.
Various	1 March 2022	Digital download; streaming	Asylum; Warner	
