= Odilia Suárez =

Argentine architect and urban planner

- Suárez in 1957
- Born: Odilia Edith Suárez; 12 November 1923; Villa María, Córdoba Province, Argentina
- Died: 11 August 2006 (aged 82); Villa María, Córdoba Province, Argentina
- Occupation(s): architect, academic, city planner
- Years active: 1948–2005

Odilia Suárez (12 November 1923 – 11 August 2006) was an Argentine architect, educator and urban planner. After graduating with the Gold Medal for 1950 from the University of Buenos Aires, she studied at Taliesin West with Frank Lloyd Wright and studied municipal planning in Canada, Great Britain and the United States. After returning to Argentina in 1964, she opened her own design studio at the University of Buenos Aires, working her way through the academic ranks to head the post-graduate research program in the architectural department, to finally Professor Emerita of the School of Architecture and Urbanism. At a time when few women were able to work in the field, Suárez was a pioneer and was committed to region-wide professionalism and scholarship. As an urban planner, she served as president of the City Council of Urban Planning for Buenos Aires and consulted on projects in Managua, Nicaragua and Puerto Madero. Her expertise led to a consultancy with the United Nations for planning and urban design throughout Latin America. Throughout her career, she won nineteen national architecture prizes and was one of the pillars of urban planning for Buenos Aires.

== Early life ==
Odilia Edith Suárez was born on 12 November 1923 in Villa María, Córdoba Province, Argentina to Lucía and Marcelino Suárez. In 1944, she entered the University of Buenos Aires studying in the School of Architecture, where she met Eduardo Sarrailh, with whom she would become both a professional and personal partner. Before she finished her schooling in 1948, Suárez began working under the direction of Antonio Bonet Castellana and Jorge Ferrari Hardoy on the team studying the city plan for Buenos Aires. At that time, she developed two primary ideas, which she would later publish in her work, La Autonomía de la Ciudad de Buenos Aires: Reflexiones desde un punto de vista territorial (The Autonomy of the City of Buenos Aires: Reflections from a territorial point of view, 1995): that urban planning must not only be strategic to satisfy needs, but must be dynamic to recognize that changes are, and have been, constant in an urban area. She graduated in 1950 with the Gold Medal for her class and continued her studies, traveling to England on a postgraduate fellowship offered by the British Council. In 1952 she went to Mexico City to write about the Eighth Pan-American Congress of Architects for Revista de Arquitectura and met Frank Lloyd Wright. She was invited to study in Arizona at Taliesin West for six months to further her education.

== Career ==
Upon her return to Buenos Aires in 1953, Suárez joined Ferrari Hardoy's team, then called the Directorate of Urbanism, and worked on the proposal for the plan of the Bajo Belgrano neighborhood of Buenos Aires. The following year, Suárez and Sarrailh founded the Estudio Suárez-Sarrailh Asociados (Studio Suárez-Sarrailh Associates) and won the first prize in a contest to create the Colonia de Vacaciones (Vacation Neighborhood) for the Federation of the Meat Industry in the Calamuchita Department in the Córdoba Province. The plan proposed a large complex developed on 250 hectares of land following the principals of organic architecture, which Suárez had learned from Wright. Though the plan was never implemented, the duo submitted a design for Newell's Old Boys Athletic Club and won first prize. Their design included a football stadium for 100,000 people, as well as an indoor stadium with a capacity to seat 10,000 spectators. It was not built at that time, but the plan was revived in 1978 for the Argentine World Cup stadium.

In 1955, Suárez-Sarrailh won 5th prize for their proposal of a civic center complex for the city of Córdoba and 4th place for a similar proposal for a civic center for Santa Rosa, La Pampa. Simultaneously, in her work for the Directorate, in 1956 she helped integrate the organization into an Urban Planning Department which focused on regulating the direction of city planning. She became the first woman to hold a chair in the Faculty of Architecture, Design and Urbanism (es) (FAU-UBA) at the University of Buenos Aires in 1957 and began her teaching activities at that time. In 1958 she became a member of the Board of Directors for the newly created Organization of the Regulatory Plan of the City of Buenos Aires (Spanish: Organización del Plan Regulador de la Ciudad de Buenos Aires (OPRBA)). The organization focused on both academic evaluation and advisory capacities to the municipality for future development. That same year, Suárez-Sarrailh won the competition for their design of the Regulatory Plan of Mar del Plata and directed a proposal for the neighborhood Casa Amarilla, which integrated among the 15,000 homes pedestrian and vehicular districts to create both a functional and visual cohesion. Though not fully implemented, the plan created the districts of Catalinas Sur, and Lugano I and II, which later became significant parts of the urban plan.

Between 1960 and 1990, Suárez won recognition in nineteen national architecture contests and served as a juror in more than fifty competitions. In 1963 Suárez-Sarrailh took first prize in the contest for the civic center for the Tres de Febrero Partido. Winning an Organization of American States (OAS) scholarship in 1964, Suárez returned to Europe and studied regional planning in Great Britain and Scandinavia. She also took further courses at York University in Toronto. In 1966 because of the military coup d'état by Juan Carlos Onganía, Suárez was forced to leave her position at FAU-UBA and on OPRBA. In 1967, she worked as an urban planning advisor to the Province of Buenos Aires and the National Development Council Spanish: Consejo Nacional de Desarrollo (CONADE)). In 1969 she won the design competition for building the civic center of Colonia Catriel in Río Negro Province, with her proposal which incorporated the use of environmental elements such as curtains of trees, ditches and mirrors of water to add interest to the bare and inhospitable appearance of the Patagonian Desert. She also designed a plan for Bahía Blanca, which was developed between 1968 and 1971 and then from 1971 to 1973 worked on the technical aspects of the Urban Planning Code (Spanish: Código de Planeamiento Urbano), which was an update of the 1962 Urban Plan and attempted to update the obsolescence of the previous plan as well as develop a planning framework.

For the next decade, Suárez predominantly worked on projects outside the country. Between 1973 and 1974, she served as a consultant to the United Nations on a plan for the reconstruction of Managua, after the 1972 Nicaragua earthquake. She designed the Guayaquil Development Plan and worked in Guayaquil, Ecuador between 1976 and 1977. Though she maintained her home in Recoleta, Buenos Aires, Suárez also kept a residence in Punta del Este, Uruguay during the military junta. In 1983, democratic government was re-established in Argentina and by 1985, Suárez was returned as the Design Chair at FAU-UBA. She was appointed as Secretary of Research and Postgraduate Studies and after eight years, was awarded the Gold Medal of the University in 1993, when she was named as a Professor Emeritus and granted a Doctor Honoris Causa from FAU-UBA. Throughout her career, Suárez published numerous books, articles and essays on urban planning, including Planes y Códigos para Buenos Aires 1925–1985 (Plans and Codes for Buenos Aires 1925–1985", 1986); Ampliación del puerto de Buenos Aires-Apreciaciones urbanísticas (Extension of the port of Buenos Aires-Urbanistic appraisals, 1998) and Sistema aeroportuario comercial metropolitano (Metropolitan commercial airport system, 2000)

From 1995 until her death, Suárez worked as a consultant on various projects and seminars, working as the director of the Center for Urban Documentation at FAU-UBA. Beginning that year, she worked with Lucila Oliver on a forum Ciudad and Rio (City and River), which evaluated the integration of plans for the city with those of the nearby river port development. Among other consultancies, she worked on a plan for the Río de la Plata, drainage issues for the city because of the confluence of the Reconquista and Matanza River basins, transport and transit issues along the north-south coastal highway, airport policies, an environmental and development plan for Puerto Madero. Her concerns for the developmental problems focused on three main axes: balancing the need to expand services in the central city with the need for high-density housing, expanding development of the southern part of the metropolis to take pressure off of the northern and more developed areas, and better communication with citizens to integrate community concerns in the planning process.

== Death and legacy ==
Suárez died on 11 August 2006. In 2014, her family donated her papers to the Archivo Histórico Sociedad Central de Arquitectos (Historical Archive of the Central Society of Architects) of Buenos Aires. The collection includes personal papers as well as drafts, drawings, photographs, working papers, writings, and other materials. After completion of the inventory and cataloging processes, the collection opened for public consultation.
