= Beg for You =

2022 single by Charli XCX featuring Rina Sawayama

Single by Charli XCX featuring Rina Sawayama

from the album Crash
- Released: 27 January 2022
- Genre: UK garage; Eurodance; dance-pop
- Length: 2:48
- Label: Asylum; Warner UK
- Songwriters: Charlotte Aitchison; Rina Sawayama; Roland Spreckley; Nicholas Gale; Sorana Păcurar; Alexander Soifer; Jonas von der Burg; Niclas von der Burg; Anoo Bhagavan
- Producer: Digital Farm Animals

Charli XCX singles chronology
"New Shapes" (2021)	"Beg for You" (2022)	"Baby" (2022)

Rina Sawayama singles chronology
"Lucid" (2020)	"Beg for You" (2022)	"Follow Me" (2022)

Music video
- "Beg for You" on YouTube

"Beg for You" is a song by British singer Charli XCX featuring Japanese-British singer Rina Sawayama. It was released on 27 January 2022 as the third single from XCX's fifth studio album, Crash (2022). The song interpolates Swedish singer September's 2006 single "Cry for You". The song received positive reviews from music critics. It peaked at number 3 in Malta and number 24 in the UK.

== Background ==
Charli XCX first teased a collaboration with Rina Sawayama in May 2021 on a TikTok livestream in which she discussed details about her upcoming album Crash and played multiple snippets of upcoming tracks from the album, including a 45-second-long one of the then-untitled collaboration with Sawayama. In December 2021, screenshots of text messages between XCX and Sawayama discussing a collaboration were posted on Instagram. On 21 January 2022, Sawayama revealed the title of the single on her TikTok account. The song premiered on 27 January 2022 on BBC Radio 1.

In an interview with Entertainment Weekly, Charli XCX discussed her inspiration behind "Beg for You". She stated that "It feels to me like one of those songs that comes on at the height of a party where you are a little bit [fucked] up, you maybe want to cry, but you also want to dance. When I was driving through L.A. listening to this beat for the first time, I felt a real sense of euphoria - but also this quite nostalgic thing. Because it's a garage beat, it reminded me of being at home in the U.K., at a house party with my friends who I've known since I was 12 years old." Additionally, she revealed that her and Sawayama first collaborated on a ballad for Charli XCX's 2019 studio album Charli, but the track was scrapped after Sawayama expressed a desire to create a pop track instead. The song's demo was pitched to XCX, who "changed a few lyrics here and there, and sang it", and then forwarded it to Sawayama.

== Music and lyrics ==
"Beg for You" is a UK garage song which "evokes the bubblegum sweetness of early 2000s pop" and features a beat "evocative of '90s house music", "wistful" piano riffs and a drop. The beat, along with the melody and hook are interpolated from Swedish singer September's hit single "Cry for You". Lyrically, it is a "clubby and poignant message to a leaving lover" in which the singers "exchange verses about missing their respective loves when they depart, reminiscing about intimate moments when they're gone".

== Critical reception ==
"Beg for You" received positive reviews from music critics. The track was placed on NME's NME Radio playlist and highlighted as "On the A List", with Karen Gwee calling it "perfect for a cathartic cry on the dancefloor". It was also placed on Paper's list of "10 New Songs You Need to Hear Now" by writer Shaad D'Souza, who lauded it as the "apotheosis of the [2000s rave revival] trend", as well as MTV's weekly "Bop Shop" selection, where XCX and Sawayama were praised for "turn[ing] a blast from the past into a fresh new dance-floor banger". Jason Lipshutz of Billboard also had a positive view of the song and opined that "you'd be hard-pressed to find two artists in their shared genre with more personality on the microphone, and they each leave a lasting impression while hoisting up a pristine melody". "Beg for You" was celebrated by Steffanee Wang of Nylon as "outstanding", a "sparkling gem", "an absolute smash" and "infinitely more swoon-worthy and addictive" compared to September's "Cry for You". Consequence selected it as their "Song of the Week", citing it as "a worthy collaboration between two artists who know what pop music needs to go from good to great". The release's use of a "Cry for You" sample, dubbed "one of [its] secret weapons", was also praised. Justin Curto of Vulture thought it to be "extremely well-executed", Steffanee Wang deemed the interpolation "ingenious: keep all the best parts of the nostalgia, and update enough of it to bring it into the new age".

== Music video ==
Backstage teasers for a music video were posted on TikTok by Sawayama. The music video was later released on February 11, 2022.

== Track listing ==
Digital download and streaming

1. "Beg for You" – 2:48

Streaming – bonus tracks

1. "Beg for You" – 2:48
2. "New Shapes" – 3:20
3. "Good Ones" – 2:16

Digital download and streaming – Pocket Remix

1. "Beg for You" (Pocket Remix) – 3:00
2. "Beg for You" – 2:48

Digital download and streaming – A. G. Cook and Vernon Remix

1. "Beg for You" (A. G. Cook and Vernon of Seventeen Remix) – 4:09
2. "Beg for You" (Pocket Remix) – 3:00
3. "Beg for You" – 2:48

== Charts ==
=== Weekly charts ===
Weekly chart performance for "Beg for You"
Chart (2022)	Peak position
CIS Airplay (TopHit)	111
Euro Digital Song Sales (Billboard)	8
Global Excl. US (Billboard)	195
Ireland (IRMA)	33
Malta Airplay (Radiomonitor)	3
New Zealand Hot Singles (RMNZ)	10
Poland Airplay (ZPAV)	15
Slovakia (Rádio Top 100)	32
UK Singles (Official Charts)	24
US Hot Dance/Electronic Songs (Billboard)	10

=== Year-end charts ===
Year-end chart performance for "Beg for You"
Chart (2022)	Position
US Hot Dance/Electronic Songs (Billboard)	67

== Certifications ==
Certifications for "Beg for You"
Region	Certification	Certified units/sales
Canada (Music Canada)	Gold	40,000^{‡}
United Kingdom (BPI)	Silver	200,000^{‡}
^{‡} Sales+streaming figures based on certification alone.

== Release history ==
Release history for "Beg For You"
Region	Date	Format	Label	Version	Ref.
Various	27 January 2022	Digital download; streaming	Asylum; Warner	Original	
Various	18 February 2022	Digital download; streaming	Asylum; Warner	Pocket remix	
Various	25 February 2022	Digital download; streaming	Asylum; Warner	Vernon remix	
