= New Shapes =

Single by Charli XCX featuring Christine and the Queens and Caroline Polachek

from the album Crash
- Released: 4 November 2021
- Genre: Synth-pop; indie pop; electro-funk
- Length: 3:20
- Label: Asylum; Warner UK
- Songwriters: Charlotte Aitchison; Deaton Chris Anthony; Noonie Bao; Héloïse Letissier; Caroline Polachek; Linus Wiklund
- Producers: Lotus IV; Deaton Chris Anthony

Charli XCX singles chronology
"Good Ones" (2021)	"New Shapes" (2021)	"Beg for You" (2022)

Christine and the Queens singles chronology
"3Sex" (2020)	"New Shapes" (2021)	"Body" (2022)

Caroline Polachek singles chronology
"Bunny Is a Rider" (2021)	"New Shapes" (2021)	"Awful Things" (2021)

Music video
- "New Shapes" on YouTube

"New Shapes" is a song by British singer Charli XCX, featuring French singer Christine and the Queens and American singer Caroline Polachek. It was released on 4 November 2021 as the second single from Charli XCX's fifth studio album, Crash (2022). The song has been described as an '80s-inspired synth-pop, indie pop, and electro-funk track.

== Background ==
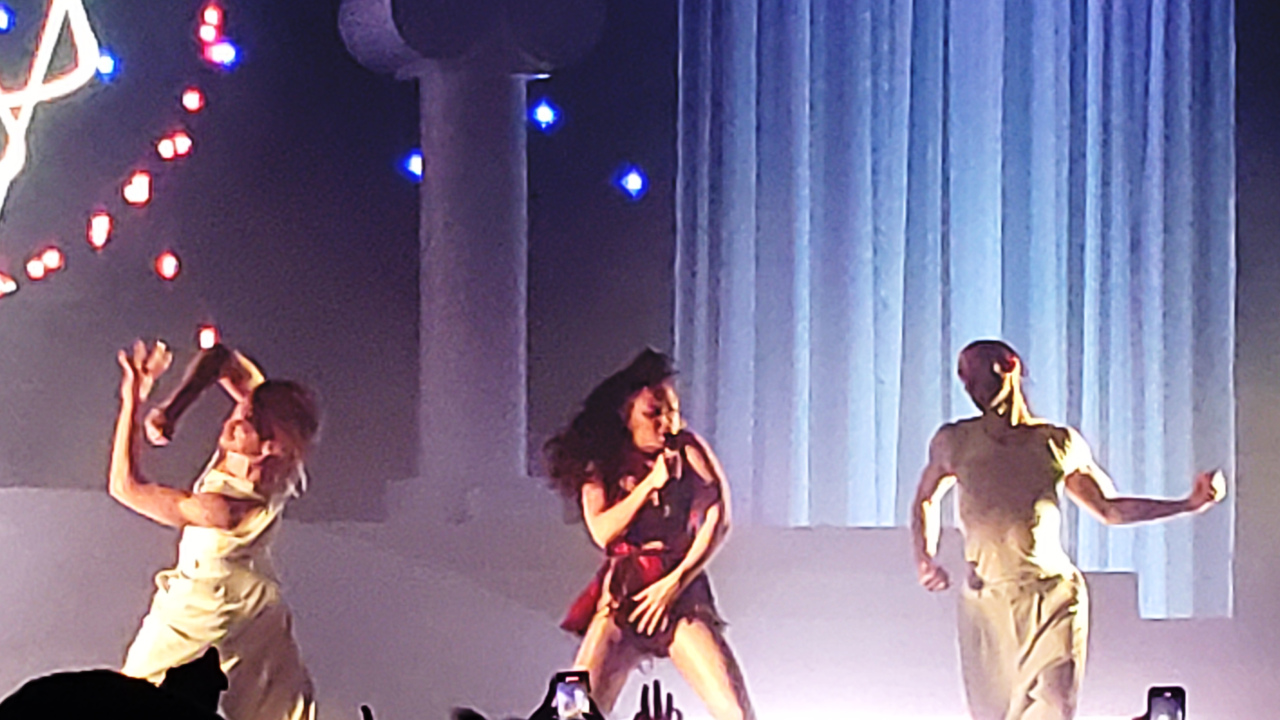
Charli XCX performing "New Shapes"

"New Shapes" was written by Charli XCX, Christine and the Queens, Caroline Polachek, Noonie Bao, Linus Wiklund and Deaton Chris Anthony, and the latter two also handled the production duties. It marks the second collaborative effort between both Charli XCX and Christine, and Charli XCX and Polachek. The former pairing made the 2019 single "Gone", while the latter created the track "Tears" from the 2017 mixtape Pop 2. Christine and Polachek, meanwhile, had previously worked together on the song "La vita nuova" in 2020. The single was described as '80s-influenced and "synth-heavy", with lyrics "lamenting (...) inability to truly let (...) significant others in, instead pushing them away, rejecting true love and embracing freedom". The track was released on 4 November 2021, with Charli XCX simultaneously announcing the title and cover of her album Crash, as well as the 2022 concert tour. The song was also previously teased during a live performance earlier in 2021, alongside another unreleased track.

== Music video ==
The music video for the song was directed by Imogene Strauss, Luke Orlando, and Terrence O'Connor, and was released on 12 November 2021. It begins with Charli XCX, Caroline Polachek and Christine and the Queens participating in an imaginary TV Heaven chat show, hosted by Benito Skinner, before teaming up to perform the song on stage. The video parodies sexist, late-night talk show hosts.

== Critical reception ==
Pitchfork's Vrinda Jagota described the song in a positive review as having "towering swells of '80s production", stating that it "combines the euphoria of a Patrick Swayze dance number with the crushing depth of a Fleabag monologue: a celebration of a love too radioactive to last." Clash's Ana Lamond said that the song "takes an alternative route to empowerment, with a laser focused hook [...] seeing the hyper-pop connoisseurs rise above the manipulative relationships they find themselves haunted by."

== Track listing ==
Digital download and streaming

1. "New Shapes" – 3:20

Streaming – bonus tracks

1. "New Shapes" – 3:20
2. "Good Ones" – 2:16

== Charts ==
Chart performance for "New Shapes"
Chart (2021)	Peak position
Ireland (IRMA)	90
New Zealand Hot Singles (RMNZ)	39

== Release history ==
Release history for "New Shapes"
Region	Date	Format	Label	Ref.
Various	4 November 2021	Digital Download; Streaming	Asylum; Warner UK	
