= Bandsintown =

Music event website

- Company type: Private
- Industry: Live music
- Founded: 2007; 19 years ago
- Founders: Todd Cronin; Phil Sergi
- Headquarters: New York City, New York, U.S.
- Number of locations: 6 offices (2017)
- Area served: Worldwide
- Key people: Fabrice Sergent (Managing Partner); Julien Mitelberg (Managing Partner)
- Brands: Bandsintown Group; Bandsintown Concerts; Bandsintown for Artists; Bandsintown Amplified; Bandsintown Promoter
- Number of employees: 80
- Website: bandsintown.com

Bandsintown is a music website that allows users to receive notifications about tours and bands playing in the user's area. It also has tools for artists to manage tour dates.

Bandsintown was included in Business Insider’s 2014 list of world's greatest apps.

== History ==
Bandsintown was founded in 2006 by Todd Cronin and Phil Sergi and officially launched in 2007 as a concert discovery service. In 2011, it was acquired by a mobile and social application publisher, Cellfish, which is known today as Bandsintown Group.

== Brands ==
Bandsintown Concerts is a concert discovery app. It pulls data from a user's iTunes library, Facebook Likes, Spotify, Rdio, Google Play and Twitter accounts to pre-populate a customized list of tracked artists and local concert recommendations. Tour dates are collected from more than 200 primary ticket providers and booking agencies, as well as the artists directly.

Bandsintown Manager is a collection of concert marketing applications for performers that allows them to list tour dates, promote events and facilitate direct contact with their fans.

Bandsintown Promoter offers promoters, venues and labels marketing data and direct access to concert-goers based on their music taste and location. The platform identifies the number of “Trackers,” or Bandsintown users following a specific artist in certain geographic locations, that can be contacted via Bandsintown's email marketing program.

Bandsintown Amplified is a multi-screen advertising platform that connects brands with fans and artists through a network of music publishers.
