= Elio (Welsh-Canadian singer) =

Welsh-Canadian singer, songwriter, and producer

- Born: Charlotte Grace Victoria Lee; September 8, 1998 (age 28); Swansea, Wales
- Origin: Toronto, Ontario, Canada
- Occupations: Singer; songwriter; producer
- Years active: 2020–present

Charlotte Grace Victoria Lee (born September 8, 1998), known professionally as Elio (stylized in all caps), is a Welsh-Canadian singer, songwriter, and producer.

== Life ==
She grew up in Swansea, but moved with her family to Toronto when she was seven.

Her first single was "My friends online", released in March 2020.

In July 2020, she released her first EP "u and me, but mostly me".

Her second EP, released in January 2021, was "Can You Hear Me Now?".

A remix album of her second EP, titled "ELIO and Friends : The Remixes", was released in May 2021.

In February 2022, she released her single "Read the room".

In August 2022, she released the mixtape "ELIO’S INFERNO".

In May 2024, she released her debut album "something in the air", originally scheduled to be released on April 19th, it was delayed to May 31st due to multiple issues. The album was preceded by the singles "Sorority" and "A2B", both released in late 2023, and "More Than My Mind", "Can I Make You Jealous?", "ASPHALT RODEO" and "my mother's jeans".

In July 2025, she released her sophomore album "autonomy". The album was preceded by the singles "Lucky October" and "Adderall".

In July 2026, she released the deluxe version "autonomy+" with four new tracks titled "Common Ground", "Already Gone", "Credit Roll" and "Hands On" featuring artist Aidan Bissett.

On November 6th 2026, she released a single titled "PRIMADONNA".

Her influences include The 1975, Charli XCX, Taylor Swift, and Sufjan Stevens.

Charli XCX is a mentor as well as being part of Elio's management team.

Lee's stage name was inspired by the character Elio Perlman played by Timothée Chalamet in the movie Call Me by Your Name.

== Discography ==
=== Studio albums ===
- something in the air (2024)
- autonomy (2025)
- autonomy+ (2026)

=== Mixtapes ===
- ELIO's INFERNO (2022)

=== Remix albums ===
- Elio and Friends : The Remixes (2021)

=== Extended plays ===
- u and me, but mostly me (2020)
- Can You Hear Me Now? (2021)
