= Joseph Beverley Fenby =

Joseph Beverley Fenby (1841–1903) was an English mechanical engineer and inventor who designed a device that would record a sequence of keyboard strokes onto paper tape. Although no model or workable device was ever made, it is often seen as a link to the concept of punched paper for player piano rolls (1880s).

Fenby was born in Liverpool, to Joseph Fenby (of Beverley, Yorkshire) and Thomasina Bolton Fenby. He was baptised 14 December 1841. He was granted a patent on 13 January 1863 (Brit. pat. 101) for an unsuccessful device called either the "Electro-Magnetic Phonoscope" or the "Electro-Magnetic Phonograph". If the latter name is correct, it could make Fenby the first to have coined the word "phonograph", long before Thomas Edison did so for his very different invention. Fenby's concept detailed a system that would record a sequence of piano or organ keyboard strokes onto paper tape. Although no model or workable device was ever made, it could be seen as a link to the concept of punched paper for player piano rolls (1880s), as well as Herman Hollerith's punch card tabulator (used in the 1890 census), a distant precursor to the modern computer.

Fenby is also known for other inventions, notably the "Fenby folding chair", patented in the United States in 1881 (U.S. patent 244,216) and an associated camp stool (U.S. patent 244,215). The chair became known as the Tripolina and inspired many similar designs.

He died in 1903, in King's Norton, England, aged 60.
