= Director's chair =

Lightweight chair that folds side-to-side

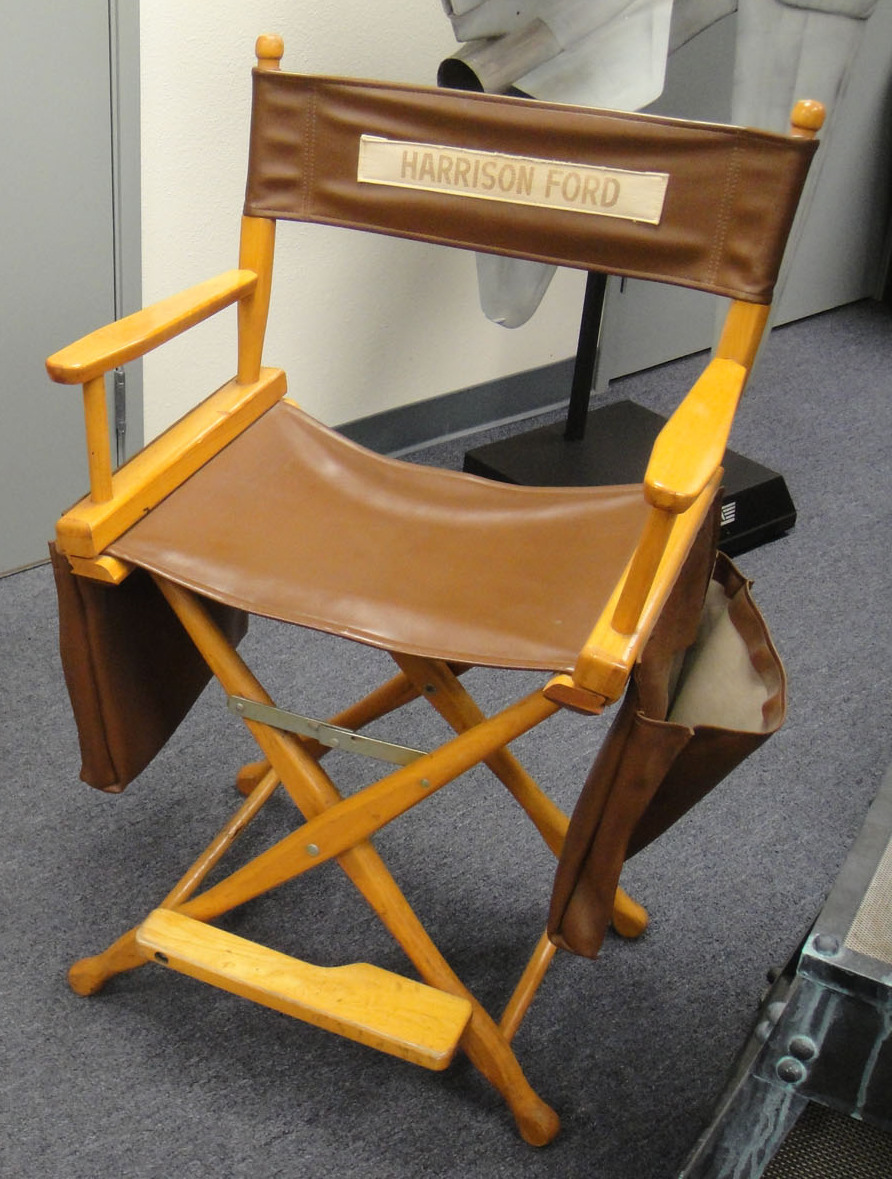
Director's chair used by actor Harrison Ford during the filming of Blade Runner

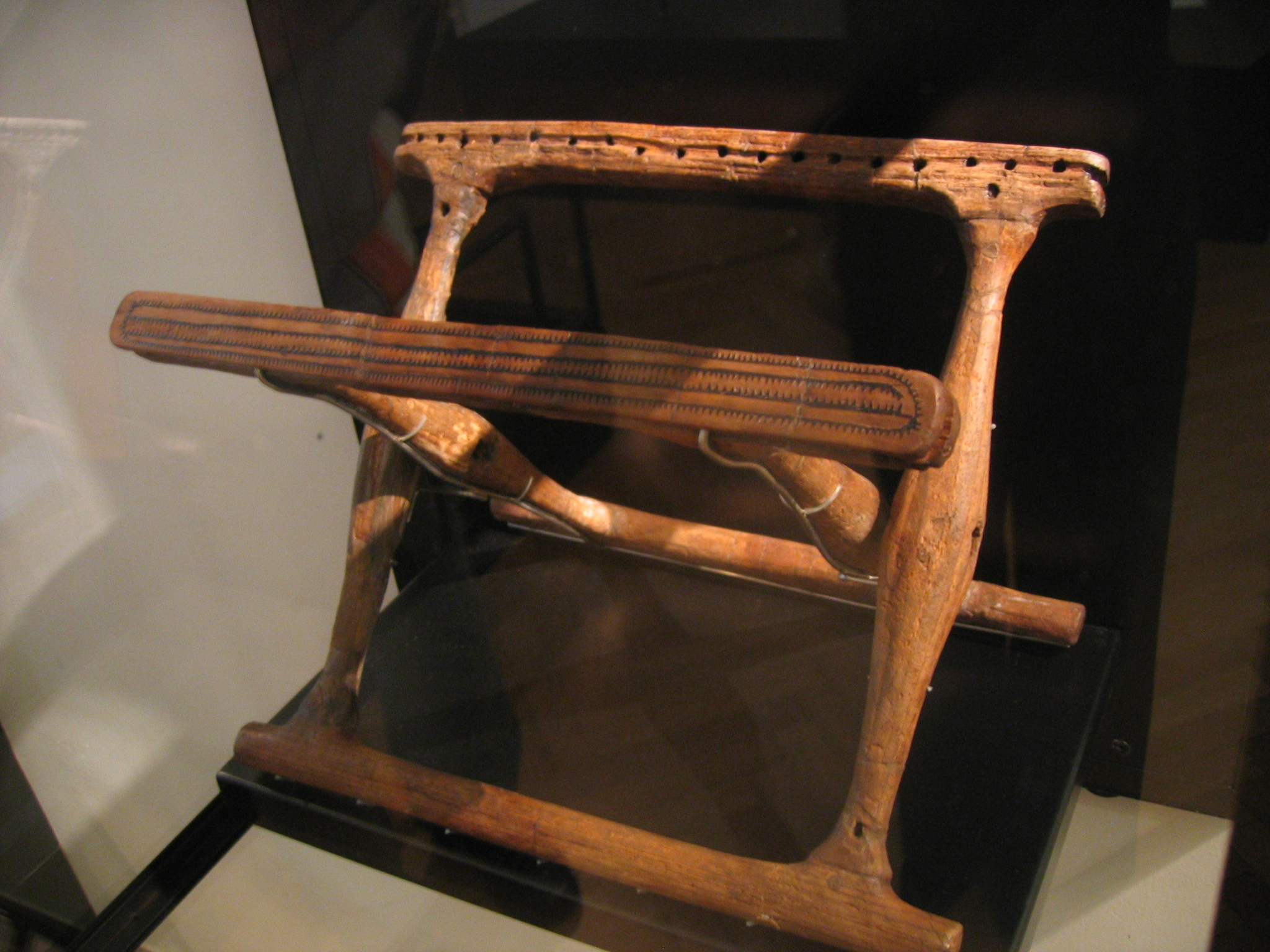
Frame of the folding stool of Guldhøj, Denmark (Nordic Bronze Age, 2nd half of 14th century B.C.)

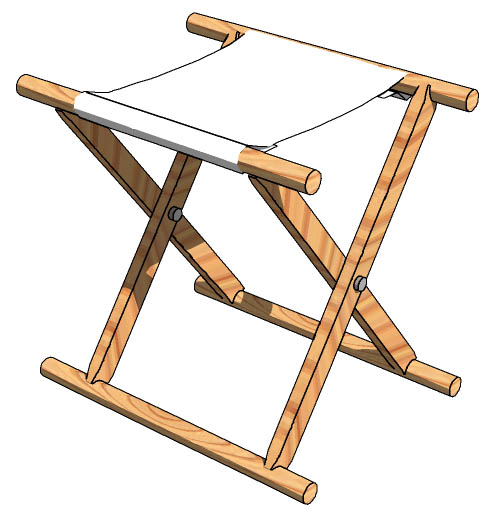
Japanese traditional folding stool

A director's chair is a lightweight chair that folds side-to-side with a scissors action. The seat and back are made of canvas or a similar strong fabric which bears the user's full weight and can be folded; the frame is made of wood, or sometimes metal or plastic. The seat and scissors members work together to support and distribute the sitter's weight so that the seat is comfortably taut. The back is usually low and the chair usually has armrests. The stereotypical image of a movie director on location includes one of these chairs, hence the name. Victor Papanek describes this chair as an excellent design in his book Design for the Real World as it is simple and ideally suited to its function, being "extremely comfortable to sit in for long periods of time". The design goes back to coffer-makers' chairs of the 15th century and eventually to the Roman curule chair.

The modern American style director's chairs were introduced by the Gold Medal Camp Furniture Company, founded, owned and operated by William Gittings and family. In 1892, the Gold Medal Classic design won an award for excellence in casual furniture design in the lead-up to the 1893 World's Fair Columbian Exposition in Chicago. Gold Medal Directors Chairs are now manufactured in Tennessee by The Lord's Table, Inc.

== See also ==
- List of chairs
