= Gold Medal Camp Furniture Company =

- U.S. National Register of Historic Places
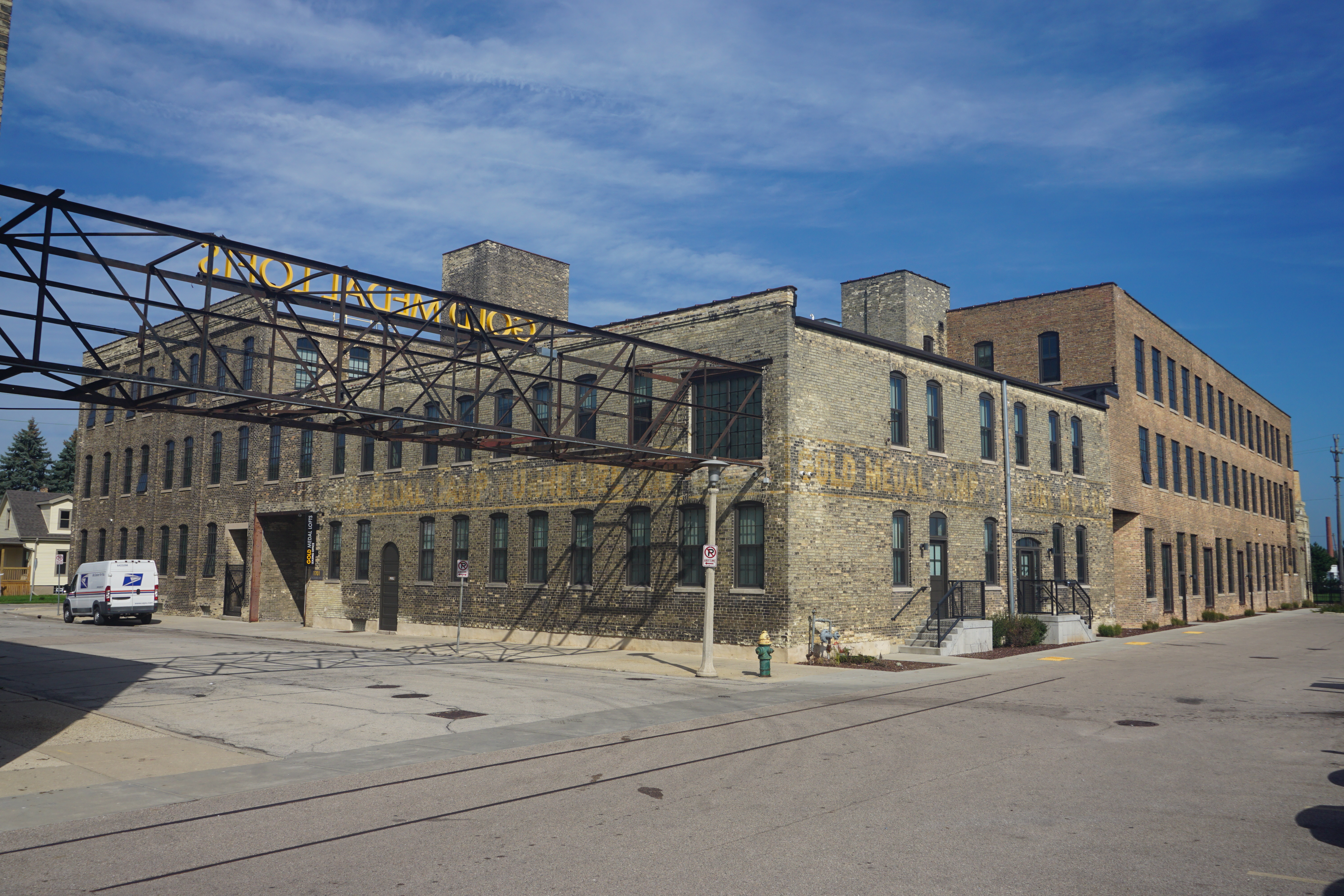

- Location within Wisconsin
- Location: 1700-1701 Packard Avenue; Racine, Wisconsin
- Coordinates: 42.7109°N 87.8009°W
- Area: 1.2 acres (0.49 ha)
- Architect: David R. Davis
- Architectural style: Late 19th And Early 20th Century American Movements
- NRHP reference No.: 100003915
- Added to NRHP: May 7, 2019

The Gold Medal building is a historic factory complex in Racine, Wisconsin. The three-story brick-walled mill-type was built between 1894 and 1924. The Wisconsin Historical Society describes the complex as "one of the best remaining examples of a mill-type factory building" in the state.

== History ==
The Racine Camp Furniture & Novelty Manufacturing Co. was founded in 1890, to manufacture furniture for camping such as tents, folding chairs, and sleeping bags. Supposedly, after the company's furniture won a gold medal at the 1893 World's Fair exhibition in Chicago, the name was changed to the Gold Medal Camp Furniture Company. However, no gold medals were actually awarded at the fair, and there is evidence of the company using the Gold Medal name earlier. The company made the standard cots for the United States military and National Guard, and also created the modern director's chair after its No. 35 folding chairs became popular in Hollywood.

In 1979, Gold Medal established a second manufacturing plant in Baxter, Tennessee. In 1986, the company decided to consolidate its operations in the face of increased competition from overseas, and closed the Racine plant. In 2019, the complex was listed on the National Register of Historic Places at the request of its owner, development firm J. Jeffers & Co., which is currently in the process of converting the historic buildings into an apartment building called Gold Medal Lofts.
