= Juan Kurchan =

Argentine architect

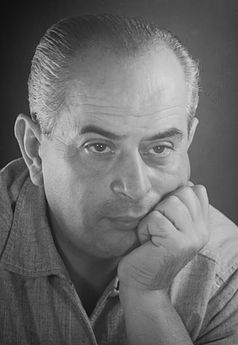
Juan Kurchan

Juan Kurchan (November 21, 1913 – November 3, 1972) was an Argentine architect, designer, and mentor of the Modern Movement in Argentina. He designed a portable seat known as the BKF Chair or butterfly chair. He was part of a group working with Le Corbusier on a plan for redevelopment of the city of Buenos Aires, and later entered the city administration and designed many new buildings there. He later became a director of the National Endowment for the Arts.

== Early life ==
Juan Kurchan was born in Buenos Aires on November 21, 1913. He studied architecture at the School of Architecture in the University of Buenos Aires. On leaving the university in 1937, he traveled to Europe in the company of his colleague and friend Jorge Ferrari Hardoy and completed his training in the studio of Le Corbusier, where he met the Catalan architect Antonio Bonet. The three worked on a master plan for the city of Buenos Aires.

== Career ==
In 1938 Kurchan joined Bonet and Ferrari Hardoy in setting up the es:Grupo Austral architectural practice. These three designed the BKF Chair that same year for Ferrari's studios in Suipacha and Esmeralda. The design became known internationally and in 1940 won prizes from the National Commissions of Culture and of Fine Arts.

In 1941, working in an architectural studio in partnership with Ferrari Hardoy, he created avant-garde designs for buildings such as a block of convertible apartments at O'Higgins 2319 in Belgrano, Buenos Aires. This served as a testing ground for a set of principles, expressed in the 1939 Grupo Austral publication Voluntad y Acción, adapting Corbusian concepts for Argentine conditions. These principles were more fully realized in later buildings in Buenos Aires: an apartment block, Los Eucaliptos, in calle Virrey del Pino 2446 (1941/1943), a "renovation of the rationalistic language"; and individual houses at Conesa 1182 and Rivadavia 613.

Together with Ferrari Hardoy, he was involved in the rebuilding of the city of San Juan after the earthquake of 1944. He later worked for the Argentine Navy as project leader in es:José Englander's engineering studio. In 1952, he became Director of Urbanism for the Buenos Aires city council.

He then joined Grupo URBIS, together with José Luis Bacigalupo, Alfredo Luis Guidali, Jorge Osvaldo Riopedre, Héctor Ugarte and Simón L. Ungar, which specialized in architecture and planning, formulating the Plan Urbis for Buenos Aires. One of the building projects he undertook with this group during the 1950s was Casa Paunero, and another was a building at Saturnino Segurola 1310 in the Vicente López district, where he took up residence for the rest of his life.

In 1966 he was appointed a director of the National Endowment for the Arts, and in the 1960s was also a member of several commercial companies: Six S.R.L., Bosix S.R.L., Series S.R.L. and Aunar S.R.L. He was involved in building projects in Uruguay, Chile and Brazil as well as Argentina. For several years he served as a member of the assessment panel (Colegio de Jurados) of the Central Society of Architects (SCA) and was a member of its Planning Commission.

Kurchan died in Buenos Aires on November 3, 1972. He was posthumously honored by the SCA for his "long career in architecture, planning, design and culture".
