= Antoni Bonet i Castellana =

Spanish architect

Antoni Bonet i Castellana (Barcelona, 1913–1989) was a Spanish architect from Catalonia, designer and urban planner.

He began his career with Josep Lluís Sert and Josep Torres Clavé. He was a member of GATCPAC. In 1936 he joins the atelier of Le Corbusier in Paris. Afterwards he works in Argentina and Uruguay.

He is best remembered as one of the designers of the "BKF" Butterfly chair, as part of the Austral Group, in Buenos Aires, Argentina in 1938, along with partners Juan Kurchan and Jorge Ferrari Hardoy.

From 1971 through 1975, his studio in Barcelona Spain, was run by the head of studio, Miguel Cervantes Martinez Brocca, a Uruguayan architect who then became head of the Central office of Bellas Artes of Spain. Bonet designed the lower apartments for La Manga Campo de Golf as well as the upper Cabeza Blanca apartments above the club house. He told the story of how Knoll came to Buenos Aires in the 1940s and bought the rights to produce the Butterfly chair. Bonet was never happy with what they got paid for those rights, but always proud of his design.

He was a true "maestro" and working on the Lower apartments at La Manga was like something out of an Ayn Rand novel in this extremely detail-oriented approach to design.
