= Deaton Chris Anthony =

American electronic songwriter and producer

- Also known as: DCA
- Born: Andrew Nicholas Georg Lövgren; November 19, 1993 (age 32); Olathe, Kansas
- Origin: Los Angeles, California
- Genres: Electronic; Hip hop
- Years active: 2015–present
- Labels: Fiat LX; Dirty Hit
- Website: deatonchrisanthony.com

Andrew Nicholas Georg Lövgren (born November 19, 1993), known professionally as Deaton Chris Anthony, is an American singer-songwriter and producer from Olathe, Kansas. From 2015 to 2020, he independently released the albums BB (2015) and BO Y (2019), and the EP BOOGY WOOGY (2020), before he signed with the British independent record label Dirty Hit. He released his first album under the label, SID THE KID, in 2022. Aside from producing music, he also designs and sells rugs, clothes, shoes, and hats.

He has produced music for Clairo and Charli XCX. His style has been described as bedroom pop, R&B, and electronic pop. He currently lives in Los Angeles, California.

== Career ==
Lovgren started making music in Kansas in 2015. He released his first album, BB, in 2015, available on cassette tape. In 2017, he moved to Echo Park, Los Angeles, to further pursue music. He released "BO Y" in 2019, with guest appearances from Clairo, Omar Apollo, and UMI. In 2020, he released his first EP, BOOGY WOOGY. He released the album SID THE KID in 2022, with guest appearances from Benee and Beabadoobee.

During the same time that Lovgren began making music, he also became a fashion designer. He makes clothes by taking pieces from other clothes and sewing them together. Vogue writer Rachel Hahn said that "he'll take one, hand-paint it, cut it up, and make a wonky pattern, creating a completely new design each time". Lovgren sells the designs on his website. He also creates photo-realistic rugs, often of faces.

In an interview with Vans, Lovgren has said that he enjoys making music with old equipment and that he often uses a bowling alley as a source of inspiration for his music. During a partnership, Vans sold bowling shoes that Lovgren designed.

== Discography ==
=== Studio albums ===
Title	Information
BB	Released: May 11, 2015; Label: Fiat LX; Format: Cassette, Digital download
BO Y	Released: November 20, 2019; Label: Self-released; Format: Digital download, streaming
BOOGY WOOGY	Released: October 15, 2020; Label: Self-released; Format: Digital download, streaming
SID THE KID	Released: July 29, 2022; Label: Dirty Hit; Format: Digital download, streaming

=== Singles ===
Title	Year	Album
"Dragon Tales"	2018	Non-album single
"Mr. Call You Back" (with Triathalon)	2019	BO Y
"1999 She"	2019	BO Y
"Sonshine" (with UMI)	2019	BO Y
"RACECAR" (feat. Clairo, Coco & Clair Clair)	2019	BO Y
"Tony Hawk" (feat. LA)	2019	BO Y
"I Love All My Friends"	2020	BOOGY WOOGY
"Tuethday"	2020	BOOGY WOOGY
"I Shake That Ath"	2020	BOOGY WOOGY
"Real Eyes Realize Real Lies"	2022	SID THE KID
"iScream" (with beabadoobee)	2022	SID THE KID
"Shed Head"	2022	SID THE KID
"Good Buy My Old Life" (with BENEE)	2022	SID THE KID
"Behind The Lockers With Hunter"	2022	SID THE KID
"I Just Steamed My Punk!"	2023	TBA
"Ralphie Choo Choo"	2023	TBA
