= Good Ones =

2021 single by Charli XCX

Single by Charli XCX

from the album Crash
- Released: 2 September 2021
- Genre: Synthwave; electropop; dance; synth-pop
- Length: 2:16
- Label: Asylum; Warner UK
- Songwriters: Charlotte Aitchison; Mattias Larsson; Robin Fredrickson; Oscar Holter; Jonnali Parmenius; Caroline Ailin
- Producer: Oscar Holter

Charli XCX singles chronology
"Out Out" (2021)	"Good Ones" (2021)	"New Shapes" (2021)

Music video
- "Good Ones" on YouTube

"Good Ones" is a song by British singer Charli XCX, released as the lead single from her fifth studio album, Crash (2022). The song was released on 2 September 2021. It is a synthwave, electropop, dance, and synth-pop song that discusses the singer's incapacity to maintain healthy relationships, instead being drawn inexorably back to the dysfunctional and destructive. It received positive reviews from critics who praised its production and Charli XCX's vocal performance, while also lamenting its short run-time.

== Background and release ==
Charli XCX revealed the song via Twitter, Instagram, and TikTok on 2 August 2021, with an image of the single art and a behind-the-scenes video, as well as a link to pre-order the track. Charli XCX shared a 30-second clip of the song on TikTok on 8 August. A week later, she shared another clip of the song, this time showing the behind-the-scenes of a photoshoot of herself sitting on a tombstone with the date "March 18, 2022", which was most likely tied to the album's release date. On 16 August, it was reported that a music video will be made, directed by Hannah Lux Davis, and a behind-the-scenes video was shared on TikTok. A preview for the music video was released on social media on 20 August. From that day to 1 September, Charli XCX teased several bits of the single, until it was finally published, along with the music video.

== Composition ==
"Good Ones" turns away from the more experimental hyperpop-oriented production of her previous releases, returning to the poppier sound present earlier in her career. It was described as a synthwave electropop, and synth-pop song, filled with "hypnotic, throbbing synths" and "punchy production". Oscar Holter of Max Martin's Wolf Cousins group created the song, which lyrically laments the singer's "incapacity to maintain healthy relationships, instead being drawn inexorably back to the dysfunctional and destructive." The track's thematic themes of tense personal relationships parallel Charli XCX's precarious relationship to her position in the music industry, and the autonomy lost by participation in it.

== Music video ==
A music video was released along with the song. The video, filmed in Mexico, was co-directed by Hannah Lux Davis, and was influenced by Janet Jackson and Britney Spears. The video features Charli XCX, in lingerie, and her backup dancers at the funeral and open grave of her boyfriend, a reception, and, after her death, her own grave. The tombstone features her own name along with her birthdate and the date 18 March 2022, the release date of Crash. A special Halloween drag lip-sync performance was also released featuring the stars of RuPaul's Drag Race UK.

== Critical reception ==
"Good Ones" received positive reviews from critics. Emma Murphree of The Daily Californian states that "The bouncy, distorted baseline underlying the opening bars of the song help build anticipation. Shortly after, when the instrumental is stripped back and Charli’s eerie falsetto dominates, the result is a sonic experience akin to levitating. The more restrained nature of the instrumentation proves compelling, though it at times leaves the listener unsatiated. Charli overwhelmingly succeeds with “Good Ones,” however, and it’s evident that she is laying the groundwork for more lyrically and musically uncurbed material to drop in the future. “Good Ones” is liquid epinephrine: It’s unrestrained and effortlessly danceable, yet it still retains an element of emotional intelligence and clarity. The future of Charli XCX looks bright." Chris Deville of Stereogum states "At just over two minutes, the song is short and sweet, merging those ’80s new wave and synthpop touchstones with more of a Y2K-era pop sensibility."

Jade Gomez of Paste praised the song, saying "Channeling the poppier sound that was prominent in the beginning of her career as opposed to the more experimental electronic production that has made her an icon amongst hyperpop and PC music scene, Charli arrives with a spectacular club banger that still carries the sharp wit and quirks that have made her an innovator." Pitchfork's Quinn Moreland complimented the song but lamented its short runtime, stating "Leave it to Charli XCX—whose finger has always been on the pulse of something weirder than the radio—to usher in some fun. “Good Ones,” her latest single, embraces, as she put it in a recent interview, the “Charli ultra popstar” version of herself, but uses this persona to examine her very human tics" and that "so many pop songs drag on for too long, but this one could stand to stretch its legs. Perhaps that's the point: the good things always slip away too quickly."

=== Rankings ===
Critical rankings for "Good Ones"
Publication	Accolade	Rank	Ref.
Clash	Charli XCX: Her 17 Best Songs	Placed	
Pitchfork	The 100 Best Songs of 2021	45	

== Commercial performance ==
In the United Kingdom, "Good Ones" debuted on the UK Singles Chart at number 44, becoming Charli XCX's 12th top 50 hit on the chart, and 17th overall. It additionally became her highest charting entry as lead artist since "1999" in 2018. In Ireland, the song debuted at number 32, marking her 16th entry in the nation. Overseas, "Good Ones" charted on the US Mainstream Top 40 airplay, where it has peaked at number 35. It earned Charli XCX her ninth-career entry there.

== Use in media ==
"Good Ones" appears in the video game Grand Theft Auto VI on the radio station "Flash FM", hosted by Robyn and Alex Consani.

== Track listing ==
- Digital download
1. "Good Ones" – 2:16
- Digital download – Joel Corry Remix
1. "Good Ones" (Joel Corry Remix) – 2:45
- Digital download – That Kind Remix
1. "Good Ones" (That Kind Remix) – 2:40
- Digital download – Perfume Genius Remix
1. "Good Ones" (Perfume Genius Remix) – 3:23

== Charts ==
Chart performance for "Good Ones"
Chart (2021–2022)	Peak position
Australia (ARIA)	94
Czech Republic Airplay (ČNS IFPI)	13
Global 200 (Billboard)	164
Hungary (Rádiós Top 40)	37
Ireland (IRMA)	32
New Zealand Hot Singles (RMNZ)	9
UK Singles (Official Charts)	44
US Dance Airplay (Billboard)	38
US Pop Airplay (Billboard)	35

== Certifications ==
Certifications for "Good Ones"
Region	Certification	Certified units/sales
Canada (Music Canada)	Gold	40,000^{‡}
United Kingdom (BPI)	Silver	200,000^{‡}
^{‡} Sales+streaming figures based on certification alone.

== Release history ==
Release history for "Good Ones"
Region	Date	Format	Label	Ref.
Various	2 September 2021	Digital download; streaming	Asylum; Warner UK	
United States	5 October 2021	Contemporary hit radio	Elektra	
