= Spicy (disambiguation) =

Spicy is the condition of having a strong, sharp smell or flavor.

Spicy may also refer to:

- "Spicy" (Aespa song)
- "Spicy" (Herve Pagez and Diplo song)
- "Spicy" (Ty Dolla Sign song)
