= Charli XCX =

British singer (born 1992)

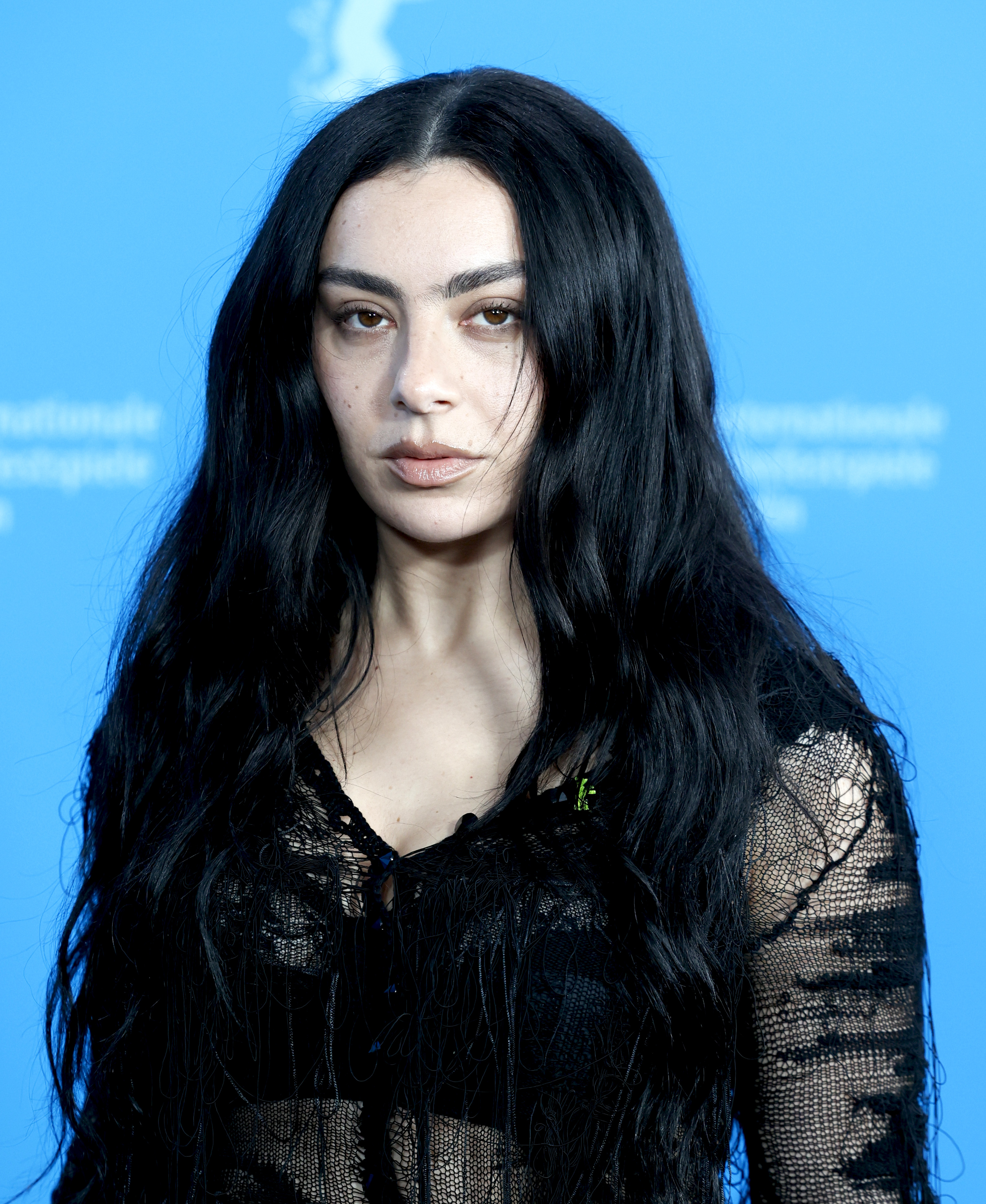
- Charli XCX at the Berlinale 2026
- Born: Charlotte Emma Aitchison; 2 August 1992 (age 34); Cambridge, England
- Occupations: Singer; songwriter; actress
- Years active: 2008–present
- Works: Discography; songs written; performances
- Spouse: George Daniel (m. 2025)
- Awards: Full list
- Musical career
- Origin: Start Hill, Essex, England
- Genres: Electropop; dance-pop; synth-pop; hyperpop
- Labels: Vroom Vroom; Atlantic; Warner; Asylum; Iamsound
- Publisher: Sony Music Publishing
- Website: charlixcx.com

Charlotte Emma Aitchison (/ˈeɪtʃɪsən/ AYTCH-ih-sən; (born 2 August 1992), known professionally as Charli XCX, (Note: Also stylised as Charli xcx) is a British singer, songwriter, and actress. She began posting songs on Myspace in 2008 before entering the London rave scene. After signing a recording contract with Asylum Records in 2010, she released a series of singles and mixtapes in the early 2010s. In 2012, she co-wrote and was featured on Icona Pop's "I Love It", which became her first number-one single in the UK and achieved international commercial success. Her debut studio album, True Romance (2013), received positive reviews from critics but did not achieve major commercial success.

In 2014, Charli XCX was featured on Iggy Azalea's single "Fancy", which became her most streamed song and one of the year's best-selling singles worldwide. The same year, she released "Boom Clap", which became her first solo top-ten single in the US. Her second album, Sucker (2014), spawned the singles "Break the Rules" and "Doing It" featuring Rita Ora. She began working alongside producers associated with the UK collective PC Music in 2015, developing a more experimental sound and image. She released the EP Vroom Vroom in 2016 and the mixtapes Number 1 Angel and Pop 2 in 2017. Her third album, Charli (2019), produced the hit single "1999" with Troye Sivan. Her fourth album, How I'm Feeling Now (2020), was made during the COVID-19 lockdowns and received critical acclaim.

Charli XCX's fifth studio album, Crash (2022), became her first number-one album in the UK and Australia. She contributed the UK top-ten single "Speed Drive" as part of the soundtrack for the 2023 film Barbie. Her sixth album, Brat (2024), became her second UK number-one album and was named the best album of 2024 by various publications, such as Billboard and Rolling Stone. The album spawned the UK top-ten hit "Apple" and the remix album brought her second number-one song, "Guess" featuring Billie Eilish. Brat and its songs won three Grammy Awards: Best Dance Pop Recording for "Von Dutch", Best Dance/Electronic Album, and Best Recording Package. The album sparked a cultural phenomenon dubbed Brat Summer, which served as an inspiration for Aidan Zamiri's film The Moment (2026) that she co-produced and starred in. During this period, Charli XCX also began appearing in independent cinema, securing acting roles in the 2025 films Erupcja, Sacrifice, and 100 Nights of Hero, as well as the 2026 films I Want Your Sex and Faces of Death. Her seventh and eighth albums Wuthering Heights and Music, Fashion, Film were released in 2026; the former also served as the soundtrack to the film of the same name.

In addition to her solo work, Charli XCX has co-written songs for other artists, including Iggy Azalea's "Beg for It" (2014), Selena Gomez's "Same Old Love" (2015), Will.i.am's "Boys & Girls" (2016), Blondie's "Tonight" (2017), Shawn Mendes and Camila Cabello's "Señorita" (2019), Sigala and Rita Ora's "You for Me" (2021), and Katseye's "Gabriela" (2025). She was awarded the ASCAP Global Impact Award in 2024 and featured on the 2024 Gold House's most impactful Asian A100 list, making her the first woman of British Indian origin to be honoured.

== Early life ==
Charlotte Emma Aitchison was born in Cambridge, England, on 2 August 1992, the only child of nurse and flight attendant Shameera and entrepreneur and talent agent Jon Aitchison. Her mother was born into a Muslim family of Gujarati Indian descent in Uganda and moved to England after they were expelled by the Idi Amin regime. Her father is Scottish. She grew up in Start Hill, Essex, and spent weekends with her maternal grandparents in Crawley, West Sussex. She attended Bishop's Stortford College in Bishop's Stortford, Hertfordshire. She briefly lived with a friend in Joensuu, Finland, describing it as a "frightening experience". She has spoken extensively about her difficulties at school growing up, stating that she was a "half-Indian girl with frizzy hair" among predominantly white people and that she was bullied and discriminated against for her Indian heritage.

She demonstrated an affinity for music from an early age, being interested in acts such as the Spice Girls and Britney Spears, and began writing songs at the age of 14. She took her stage name "Charli XCX" from her MSN Messenger screen name as she could not think of anything else and did not have a manager at the time. She told the Grammy Awards that she would stick with it and "not pull a Prince" (in reference to the singer changing his name to a symbol).

== Career ==
=== 2008–2011: Career beginnings ===
At 14, Aitchison persuaded her parents to grant her a loan to record her first album, 14, and in early 2008 she began posting songs from the album, as well as numerous other demos, on her official Myspace page. This caught the attention of a promoter running numerous illegal warehouse raves and parties in East London, who invited her to perform at them. She was billed on flyers under the stage name Charli XCX; "XCX" (or "kiss Charli kiss") which was her MSN Messenger display name when she was younger. Despite the illicit nature of the gigs, her parents were supportive of her career and attended several raves with her. In late 2008, while 14 was never commercially released, she released the two singles "!Franchesckaar!" and double A-side "Emelline"/"Art Bitch" under Orgy Music. She has since frequently expressed her distaste for her music of the time, going as far to call it "gimmicky dance tracks" and "fucking terrible Myspace music". At the age of 18, Charli XCX moved to London to study for a fine art degree at UCL's Slade School of Fine Art but dropped out in her second year.

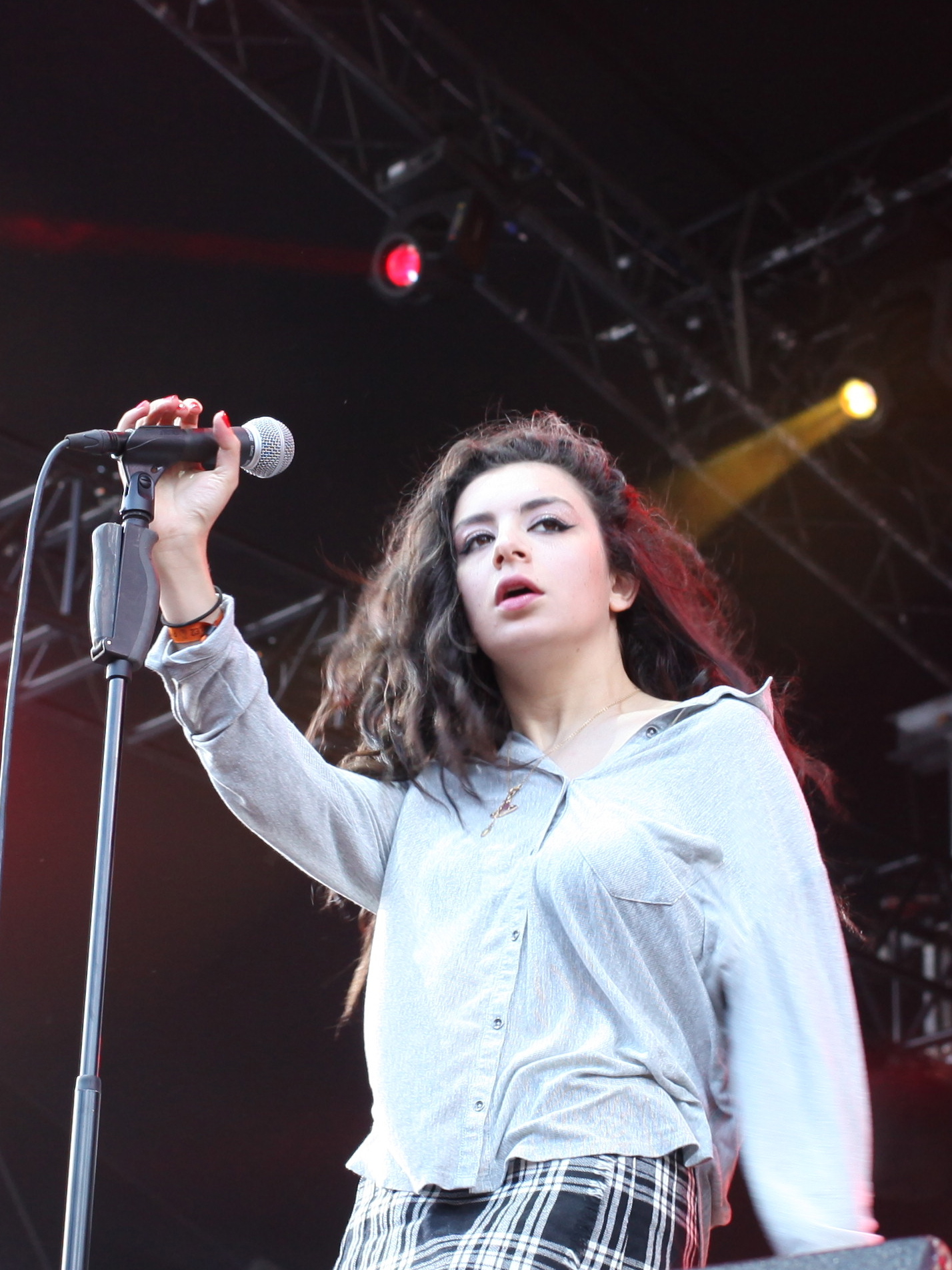
Charli XCX performing at the 2013 Positivus Festival

In 2010, Charli XCX was signed to Asylum Records. She later described herself as being "lost". In an interview with The Guardian, Charli XCX said, "I was still in school. I'd just come out of this weird rave scene, and I wasn't really sure what to make of that. And, when I got signed, I hated pop music; I wanted to make bad rap music. I didn't know who I was. I didn't know what I liked. Even though I was signed, I was still figuring it out." She eventually flew to Los Angeles to meet producers and found it "wasn't working out for me" until she met with American producer Ariel Rechtshaid. They had a two-hour session and wrote the song "Stay Away". She stated that was "when things started to come together". Early in 2011, she was featured on the Alex Metric single "End of the World". She left during the second year of her degree course at the Slade School of Fine Art to focus on her music career. In May and November 2011, she released the singles "Stay Away" and "Nuclear Seasons" respectively, and gained attention from music website Pitchfork, where she earned "Best New Track" accolades for both; the former was eventually named to the site's "Best Tracks of 2011" list.

=== 2012–2015: Breakthrough with True Romance and Sucker ===
In addition to Rechtshaid, she began working with Swedish producer Patrik Berger. He sent her two beats, and she quickly wrote songs for each, one of which became "I Love It" and the other of which became "You're the One". She stated she did not end up releasing "I Love It" herself as she could not reconcile it with her sound, but in 2012, Swedish duo Icona Pop re-recorded the song and released it as a single featuring her vocals. The song became an international hit, hitting number one in Charli XCX's home country and climbing to number seven on the Billboard Hot 100 in 2013. In June, she released "You're the One" as a single from her EP of the same name, followed by her debut mixtape Heartbreaks and Earthquakes, a one-track file consisting of eight songs, including a cover of the Blood Orange song "Champagne Coast" and Odd Future's remix of "You're the One". On Halloween, she released a new song called "Cloud Aura" featuring Brooke Candy, followed by her second mixtape Super Ultra, released exclusively through her website in November. In early 2013, she released "You (Ha Ha Ha)" and announced her debut album, followed by "What I Like" in March. True Romance was released on 12 April 2013. It peaked at number 85 on the UK Albums Chart, at number five on the US Billboard Top Heatseekers, and at number 11 on the Australian Hitseekers Albums Chart. The album was received well by music critics, earning a 76/100 on Metacritic, which assigns a normalised rating out of 100 based on reviews from mainstream critics, indicating the album's "generally favorable reviews". In May, she released "Just Desserts", a song with Welsh singer-songwriter Marina and the Diamonds.

Charli XCX began writing her second album in mid-2013, saying she initially wanted to go to India to record, but later decided she wanted to record in France, she said: "Two months ago, I wanted to go to India and record it, and now I want to record it in France. So I feel like nothing is definite – like, I feel very all-over-the-place at the moment. But at the moment, my heart's set on going to France and recording it, but that was different two months ago, so who knows what's going to happen?" Frustrated with the music industry, she ended up going to Sweden, isolating herself from her record label, and made a punk-inspired album over a month. Charli XCX worked on the album with Patrik Berger; of their process, she later reflected that it was "not thought-about, everything really spontaneous [...] We don't think – it's like the first thing that comes out of my mouth is the cut on the record." Their initial work, however, was eventually scrapped for a more "pop-oriented" album. The album included a song called "Mow That Lawn", which was debuted live a year later at Ilosaarirock Festival in Finland.

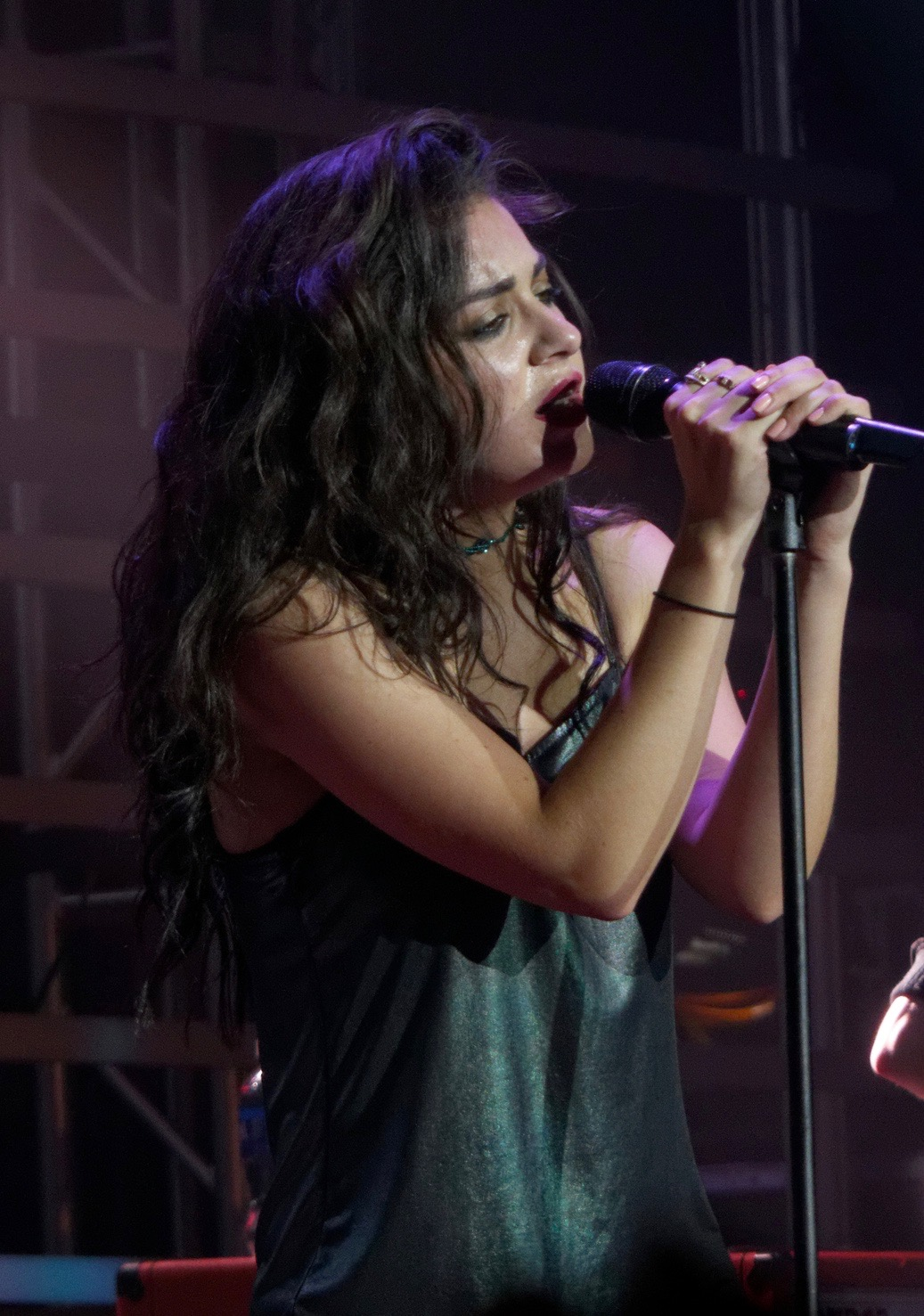
Charli XCX performing for MTV in 2014

In late 2013, "SuperLove" was released as the lead single from the album and reached number 62 on the UK Singles Chart, becoming Charli XCX's first solo entry on the chart. In January 2014, she released a song called "Allergic to Love" on her SoundCloud. While writing the album, she did further sessions with Weezer frontman Rivers Cuomo, Rostam Batmanglij from Vampire Weekend, production duo Stargate, John Hill and a session with Dr. Luke which she said "wasn't for me". In an interview with DIY magazine, she stated that she wrote the record for girls and wants them to feel "a sense of empowerment". Charli XCX explained in her tour diary with Replay Laserblast that the record's genre is still pop but has a very shouty, girl-power, girl-gang, Bow Wow Wow feel to it at the same time. "SuperLove" was eventually scrapped from the album.

In early 2014, Charli XCX was featured on Australian rapper Iggy Azalea's single "Fancy"; the track topped the US Billboard Hot 100, becoming both artists' first number-one single on the chart. Charli XCX expanded her portfolio of songwriting for other artists during this period, with credits on Azalea's 2014 single "Beg for It", Ryn Weaver's debut single "OctaHate", and material for acts including Sky Ferreira, Neon Jungle, Rihanna, and Gwen Stefani. In mid-2014, Charli XCX contributed the song "Boom Clap" to the soundtrack of the film The Fault in Our Stars. "Boom Clap" peaked at number eight on the Billboard Hot 100 and at number six in the UK and was certified platinum in Australia. In August, a release date of October was announced for her new album Sucker, along with the lead single "Break the Rules". She said the song came about after she had made her punk album in Sweden, when she "came out of the other side of that punk phase and translated it into something more pop". She stated that the album was "obviously [...] about not giving a fuck". The album was pushed back the next month due to the success of "Boom Clap" and was officially released in December 2014. It debuted at number 28 on the US Billboard 200, making it Charli XCX's first album to enter the chart and number 15 on the UK Albums Chart. The album's third single, "Doing It" featuring fellow British singer Rita Ora, was released in February and peaked at number 8 on the UK Singles Chart.

Charli XCX considers herself a feminist and wrote one of the songs on Sucker, "Body of My Own", as a feminist statement. She appeared in the documentary about gender equality The F Word and Me, which premiered on BBC Three in 2015. Charli XCX opened for Katy Perry on the European leg of Perry's Prismatic World Tour in early 2015, headlined her own UK tour, and featured alongside R&B artist Tinashe on fellow singer Ty Dolla Sign's single "Drop That Kitty". A music video for the single "Famous" was released on 23 March 2015. and was ranked by Time and Pitchfork as the 5th and 19th best pop music video of the year, respectively. In July and August 2015, Charli XCX co-headlined Charli and Jack do America Tour, a US tour with Bleachers. She announced on 21 August that, for "personal reasons", a planned second leg of the tour would not go ahead.

=== 2015–2018: Vroom Vroom, Number 1 Angel, and Pop 2 ===
In a July 2015 interview, Charli XCX said that she was working on her third album and described it as "the most pop thing, and the most electronic thing" she had ever done. In October 2015, she premiered the new song "Vroom Vroom" on the Beats 1 radio show, claiming it would be the first song released from what would be her next studio album. On 23 February 2016, it was announced that she had set up an experimental pop record label, Vroom Vroom Recordings, and that she would release an EP entitled Vroom Vroom on 26 February 2016. The title song was officially released that day. The second song released from the EP, entitled "Trophy", received its first play on Zane Lowe's Beats 1 show that night. It was also announced that she would host her own Beats 1 show titled The Candy Shop. Vroom Vroom was mainly produced by Sophie as a teaser for her album. The avant-pop EP marked a sharp shift in tone from her previous album and was released to divided reviews.

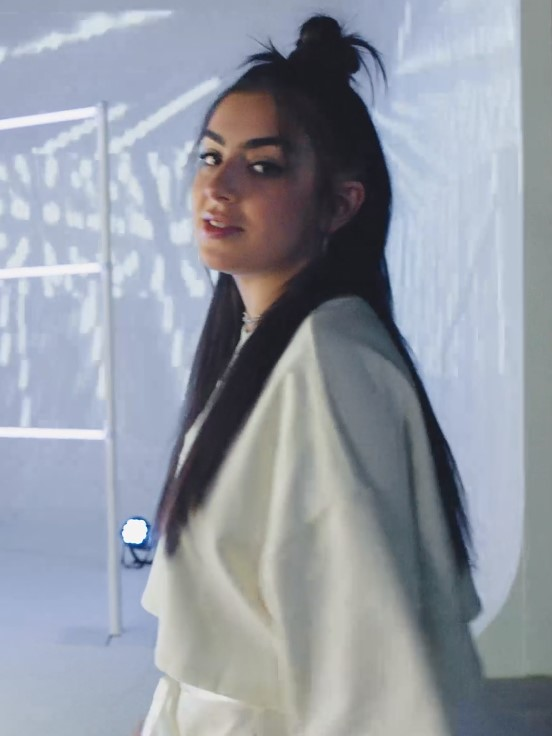
Charli XCX in 2017

In July 2016, it was announced that British producer A. G. Cook, founder of record label PC Music, had signed on as Charli XCX's creative director. On 28 October, the lead single from her third album, "After the Afterparty", was released. It charted at 29 in the UK Singles Chart and was certified gold by the BPI. On 8 February 2017, she performed it on Jimmy Kimmel Live!, along with a new song titled "Bounce" featuring Kyary Pamyu Pamyu. On 10 March 2017, Charli XCX released the mixtape, Number 1 Angel, which featured an all-female line-up of guest artists including MØ, Raye, Starrah, Uffie, Abra, and Cupcakke and was produced largely by PC Music artists including A. G. Cook, EasyFun, and Sophie.

On 17 March 2017, Mura Masa released his single "1 Night", which featured vocals from Charli XCX. On 26 July 2017, Charli XCX released "Boys", along with a self-directed music video featuring an ensemble cast of male celebrities, including Joe Jonas and Brendon Urie, among others. On 6 August, Charli XCX performed at the Lollapalooza music festival. In 2017, the majority of Charli XCX's third studio album was leaked with the remainder of the tracks leaking the following year. The leak of the album featuring the then-lead single "After the Afterparty" led to the cancellation of the album release and Charli XCX deciding to make an entirely new third studio album.

The Number 1 Angel follow-up mixtape, Pop 2, was released on 15 December 2017, featuring collaborations with Carly Rae Jepsen, Tove Lo, Alma, Caroline Polachek, Brooke Candy, Cupcakke, Pabllo Vittar, Dorian Electra, Mykki Blanco, Tommy Cash, Kim Petras, Jay Park and MØ. On 15 March 2018, Charli XCX performed at El Rey Theatre in Los Angeles in support of Pop 2. In May 2018, Charli XCX started performing on Taylor Swift's Reputation Stadium Tour as an opening act alongside Camila Cabello. On 31 May, the day of the first concert on Swift's tour, she released "5 in the Morning". On 29 June, she released "Focus" and "No Angel" as a double single. On 27 July, she released the single "Girls Night Out", which had previously been performed live and leaked in 2017.

=== 2018–2023: Charli, How I'm Feeling Now and Crash ===
On 5 October 2018, Charli XCX released the single "1999" with South African–Australian artist Troye Sivan, as the lead single from her third album Charli. The single reached number 13 on the UK Singles Chart and became Charli XCX's tenth Top 40 single and also her first Top 15 single since 2015. The music video for "1999" was released on 11 October and starred Charli XCX and Sivan, featuring various references to 1990s pop culture. Charli XCX was featured on MØ's album Forever Neverland with the song "If It's Over".

On 16 May 2019, Charli XCX released the second single from Charli, "Blame It on Your Love", featuring American singer and rapper Lizzo. The track was written in Los Angeles and produced by long standing collaborators Stargate with additional production by A. G. Cook and EasyFun. Elements from "Blame It on Your Love" were taken from a previous release, "Track 10", from her 2017 mixtape Pop 2. On 25 May, Charli XCX pulled out of BBC Radio 1's Big Weekend, with Chase & Status replacing her. On 30 May, she performed a new song from Charli with Christine and the Queens titled "Gone" at Primavera Sound in Barcelona. On 30 May, Charli XCX collaborated with Diplo and Herve Pagez on the song "Spicy". On 7 June, Charli XCX released a collaboration track titled "Dream Glow" with Jin, Jimin and Jungkook of the South Korean boy band BTS for the soundtrack to their Netmarble game, BTS World. On 17 July, "Gone" was released as the third single from the album. The first promotional single, "Cross You Out" featuring Sky Ferreira, was released on 16 August, followed by the second to fourth promotional singles: "Warm" featuring Haim, on 30 August; "February 2017" featuring Clairo and Yaeji, on 6 September; and "2099" featuring Troye Sivan, on 10 September. The album was released on 13 September by Asylum and Atlantic Records.

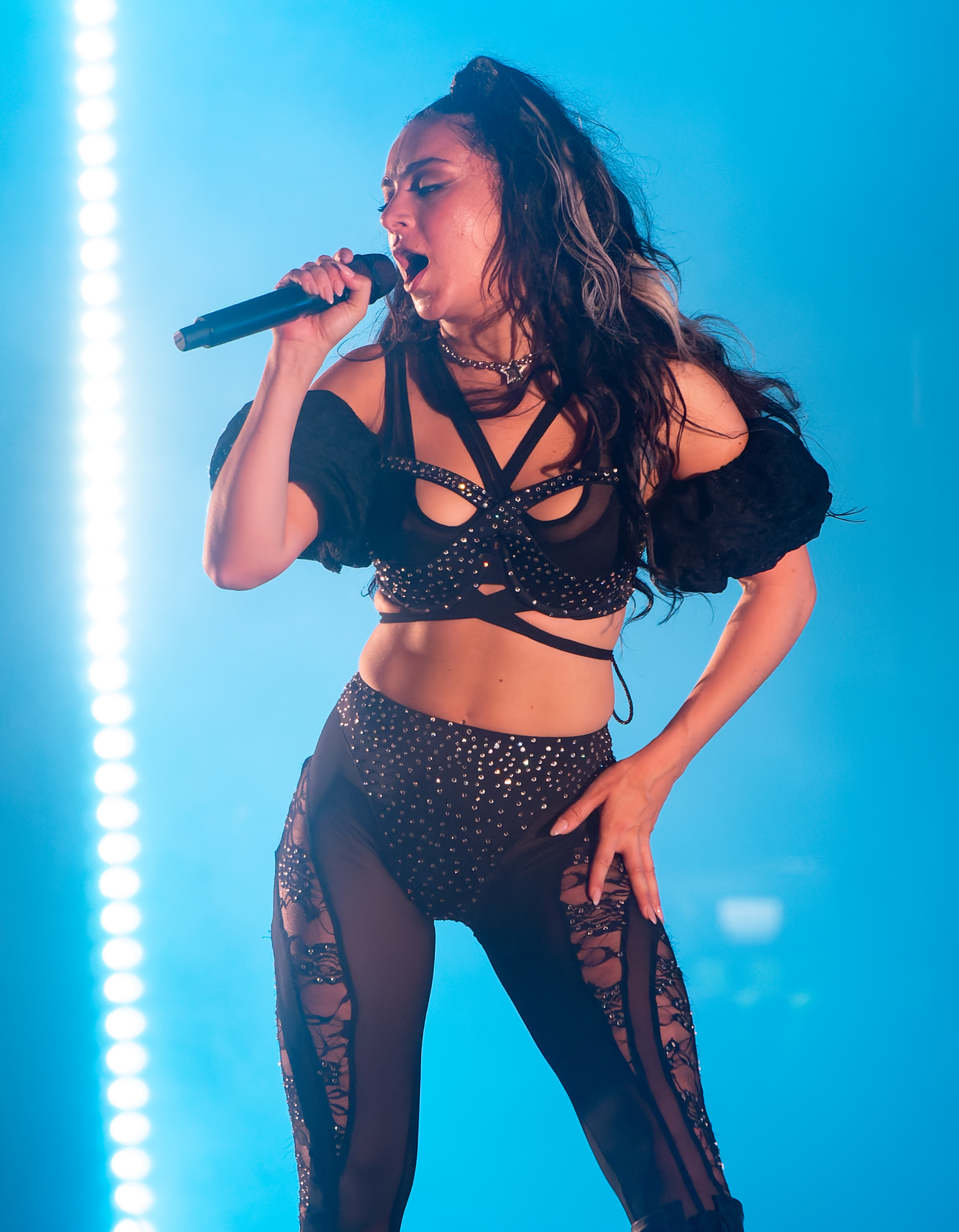
Charli XCX performing at Primavera Sound 2022

On 13 January 2020, Charli XCX was featured on the Galantis song "We Are Born to Play", which was used as the theme song for the Japanese theme park Super Nintendo World. The following month, she was featured on 100 Gecs's single "Ringtone" with Kero Kero Bonito and Rico Nasty. Amid the COVID-19 pandemic, Charli XCX announced a new album, titled How I'm Feeling Now in April 2020. She subsequently released the singles "Forever", "Claws" and "I Finally Understand". How I'm Feeling Now was released on 15 May 2020. The album was written and recorded in the span of six weeks during the COVID-19 lockdowns. She used her platform on Instagram to communicate with fans while making the album, posting different variations of lyrics, single covers and sound samples that could be voted on, the most popular being the one she released officially. In reviews, Kitty Empire of The Guardian described it as "truly a work of its time". Charli XCX's first post-pandemic performance was at Wynwood Pride in Miami in June 2021. Early in February 2021, the Dirty Hit signed musician No Rome announced he was working on a track featuring Charli XCX along with label mates The 1975.

On 19 February, she featured on a new version of a track called "Charger" by the Welsh-Canadian artist Elio. In a TikTok posted on 16 March, she revealed that she is working on her next studio album, saying she was "feeling very inspired". Her next album would be her final record with Atlantic Records. On 28 April, Charli XCX was featured on a remix of the song "Drama" from the album Good Luck by Bladee and Mechatok. On 2 September, "Good Ones" was released as the lead single from her upcoming album. A second single, "New Shapes", featuring Christine and the Queens and Caroline Polachek, was released on 4 November. Along with the single release, Charli XCX officially announced her fifth studio album, titled Crash, which was released on 18 March 2022. A third single, "Beg for You" featuring Rina Sawayama, was released 27 January.

=== 2023–2025: Brat ===
In February 2023, Charli XCX revealed in an interview with British Vogue that she had signed a new recording contract for her next two albums. On 15 April, she co-headlined the Coachella Festival. She contributed to the soundtrack of three films, releasing the singles "Hot Girl", from the soundtrack to the 2022 film Bodies Bodies Bodies, and "Speed Drive", from the soundtrack to the 2023 film Barbie. "Speed Drive" entered the UK Singles Chart at number nine and the Billboard Hot 100 at number 73, her first singles to chart since "Boom Clap" and "Break the Rules" in 2014. She also served as the score co-composer alongside Leo Birenberg for the 2023 film Bottoms. In August 2023, Charli XCX collaborated with singer Addison Rae on the song "2 Die 4" from Rae's extended play (EP) AR. The following October, she teamed up with English singer Sam Smith on the single "In the City". Smith and Devon Lee Carlson also appear in the video of "Speed Drive".

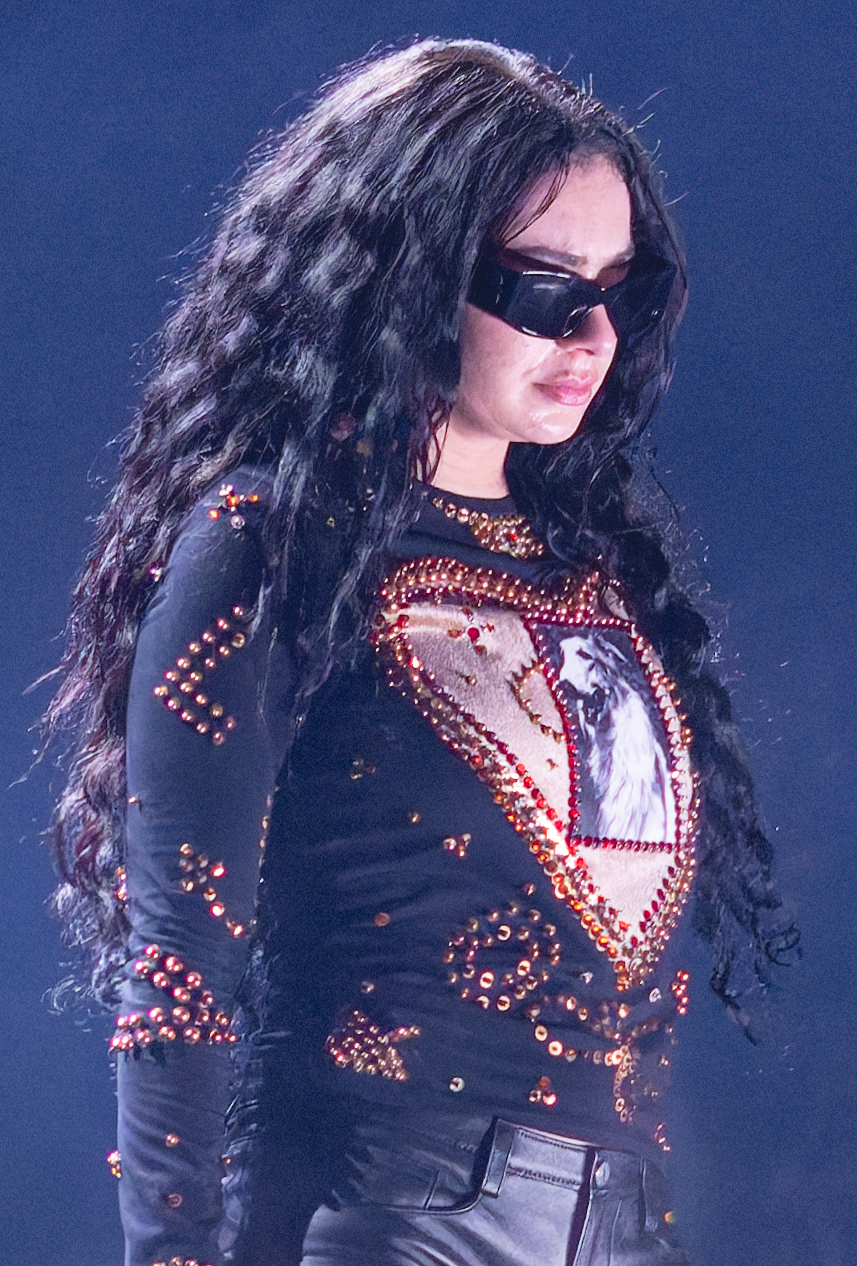
Charli XCX performing at BP Pulse Live in 2024

In 2024, Charli XCX played her second Boiler Room set since 2020, titled PARTYGIRL, which took place on 22 February in Brooklyn. The set received about 37,000 RSVPs, the largest number in the history of Boiler Room, and of that number, only 400 were permitted entry. The set featured guest performances from A. G. Cook, George Daniel, Doss, Easyfun, Addison Rae and Julia Fox, and songs from her upcoming album were teased.

"Von Dutch", the lead single for Charli XCX's sixth album, Brat, was released on 29 February 2024. "360" was released as the second single from the album alongside a music video on 10 May 2024. The video was described by Harper's Bazaar as "Brimming With the Internet's Favorite It Girls". The album was released on 7 June 2024. Brat quickly received universal critical acclaim; it achieved a Metacritic score of 95, the highest for any album released in 2024, thus becoming one of Metacritic's top 20 highest-rated albums of all time. Its lime-green cover art and aesthetic became a viral Internet trend and received widespread media coverage, including for its use by the Kamala Harris 2024 presidential campaign.

The song "Guess" was initially released as part of the deluxe edition of Brat, released on 10 June 2024, titled Brat and It's the Same but There's Three More Songs So It's Not. A remix of this song featuring Billie Eilish debuted atop the UK Singles Chart, marking Charli XCX's second number-one single after her feature on Icona Pop's "I Love It" a decade earlier. "Apple" was released as a single from the album after the song went viral on TikTok. Charli XCX also served as the executive producer to the soundtracks for the film Mother Mary and the TV series Overcompensating. She co-executive-produced the former with Jack Antonoff and produced music for the latter. In 2024, she was awarded the ASCAP Global Impact Award in recognition of her contributions to pop music. She was also on 2024 Gold House's most impactful Asian A100 list, making her the first woman of British Indian origin to be honoured.

The remix album, titled Brat and It's Completely Different but Also Still Brat, was released on 11 October 2024. It features artists such as Ariana Grande, Kesha, Caroline Polachek, Tinashe, Jon Hopkins, Bon Iver, Shygirl, Bladee, Julian Casablancas, the Japanese House, Bb trickz and The 1975. It included these previously released collaborations as part of its tracklist: an A. G. Cook remix of "Von Dutch" featuring Addison Rae, "360" featuring Robyn and Yung Lean, "Girl, So Confusing" featuring Lorde, "Guess" featuring Billie Eilish and "Talk Talk" featuring Troye Sivan. Charli XCX was named US ambassador of cosmetics brand Valentino Beauty in October 2024 and appeared as host and musical guest on Saturday Night Live on 16 November 2024. On 6 December, Financial Times named Charli XCX one of the most influential women of 2024.

After her song "Party 4 U" began to resurge in popularity and streaming in early 2025 after going viral on TikTok, a music video for the track was released on 15 May 2025, coinciding with the fifth anniversary of the release of How I'm Feeling Now, its parent album. On 7 June 2025, she made a surprise appearance during Air's set at Paris's We Love Green Festival, and performed "Cherry Blossom Girl" with the band. On 21 June 2025, she made another appearance as Dua Lipa's surprise guest on the 2nd night of the London dates of her Radical Optimism Tour, where they performed "360" together. On 22 October 2025, Charli XCX joined the stage at Addison Rae's debut album tour in Los Angeles.

=== 2025–present: film projects, Wuthering Heights, and Music, Fashion, Film ===
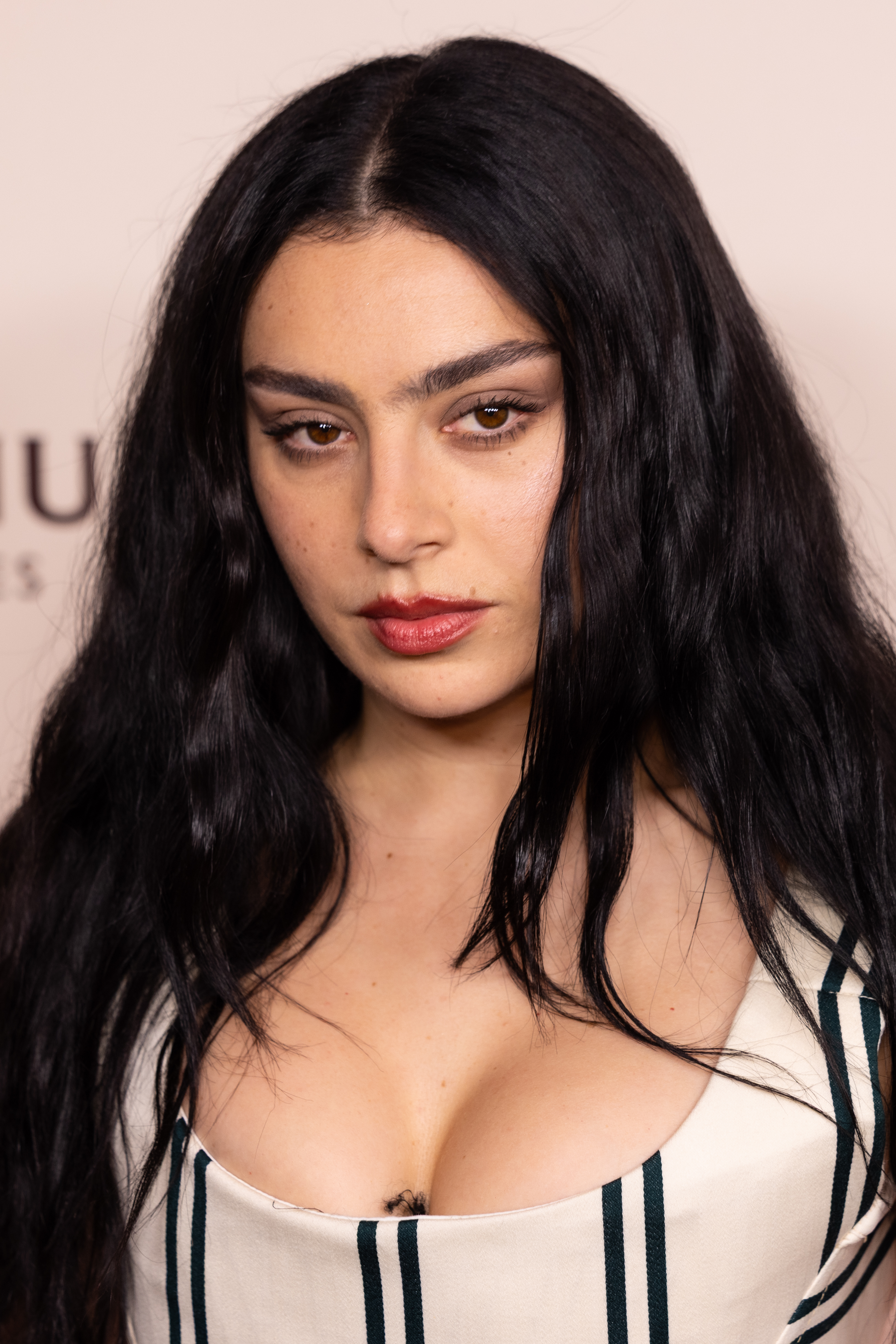
Charli XCX at the 2025 Cannes Film Festival

On 10 November 2025, Charli XCX released the song "House" in collaboration with John Cale of the Velvet Underground. The song served as the lead single from her soundtrack album for Emerald Fennell's drama film, Wuthering Heights (2026), based on the novel by Emily Brontë. On 13 November 2025, the album was formally announced, coinciding with the release of second single "Chains of Love" and the film's official trailer featuring the song. A music video for "Chains of Love" was released on 17 November. The third single, "Wall of Sound", was released on 16 January.

Charli XCX produced her first film, The Moment, under the umbrella of her production company Studio365. The film premiered at the Sundance Film Festival on 23 January 2026. It was given a limited release in the United States on 30 January 2026, with a wider release on 6 February and in the United Kingdom on 20 February. On 12 May 2026, she became the Global Brand Ambassador and a shareholder of the consumer electronics company Nothing.

On 24 July 2026, she released her eighth studio album Music, Fashion, Film via Atlantic, which received immediate critical acclaim. The album included the previously released singles "Rock Music", "SS26", "Wink Wink", and "Camera". An expanded edition containing the B-sides to three of the singles was released on 26 July. She announced the North American leg of her Music, Fashion, Film Tour, beginning on 11 September, and is set to conclude on 23 October, with Underscores being the opening act for each show. She later announced the European leg of the tour on 11 September, which will start on 13 February 2027, and is set to conclude on 24 February, with Audrey Hobert being the opening act.

In July 2026, it was reported that a portrait of Charli XCX representing her Brat era, photographed by Harley Weir, would be added to the National Portrait Gallery collection. She was featured on Madonna's "Danceteria Afterhours", released on 24 September 2026. On 27 September 2026, they performed it at the 2026 MTV Video Music Awards.

== Artistry ==
=== Musical style ===
Music critics have characterised Charli XCX's music using a variety of terms, including electropop, dance-pop, synth-pop, alternative pop, hyperpop, pop-punk, dark wave, witch house, gothic pop, avant-pop, and experimental pop. Lyrically, her songs deal with numerous subjects, including sex, cars, hedonism, and love. Her earliest demos, including those released on Myspace, were described as "trashy techno". Subsequent releases were labelled as a blend of dark wave and witch house. Charli XCX's first album was described alternatively as gothic pop and synth-pop, while her second was described as pop punk, containing elements of punk rock, new wave and power pop. Critics marked the beginning of Charli XCX's collaborations with PC Music-signed artists as a turning point in her discography.

Releases following Sucker explored an avant-pop direction. Vroom Vroom contained elements of Eurodance, while Number 1 Angel evidenced elements of trap, R&B, electropop, synth-pop, and experimental pop. Pop 2 and Charli were noted for their numerous collaborations and maintained their predecessors' avant-pop composition as well as incorporating elements of avant-garde, Eurodance, and J-pop music. How I'm Feeling Now was described as a "club-pop", hyperpop and experimental pop album with elements of garage, trance and bubblegum pop, in which Charli XCX addresses her life during COVID-19 lockdowns. Crash was dubbed a synth-pop and 1980s pop album with hints of synthwave, Eurodance, hard funk, swingbeat, bubblegum pop, Italo disco and indie pop music that was noted for its departure from Charli XCX's previous experimental pop releases. It was noted for its attempt at appealing to a more mainstream audience, and its deal-with-the-devil-centred aesthetic.

Charli XCX's "party girl" aesthetic seen in Brat has drawn similarities and comparisons to Kesha. Charli XCX's singing voice has been compared to those of Gwen Stefani and Marina Diamandis. She has been described as having an alto vocal range. Charli XCX has been described as inspired heavily by the 2010s "hyperpop" style, though she rejected the term on social media, saying she does "not identify with music genres".

=== Influences ===
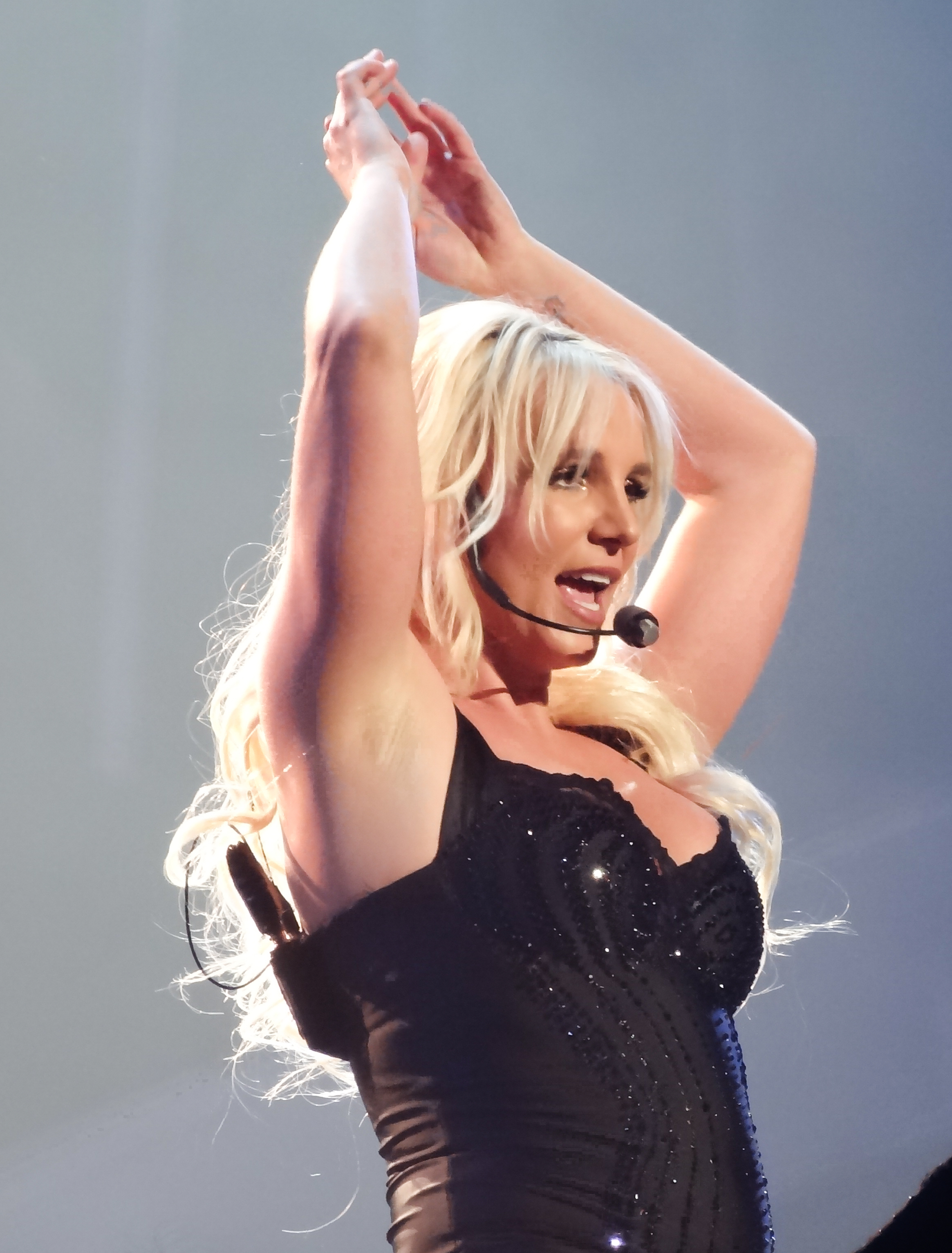
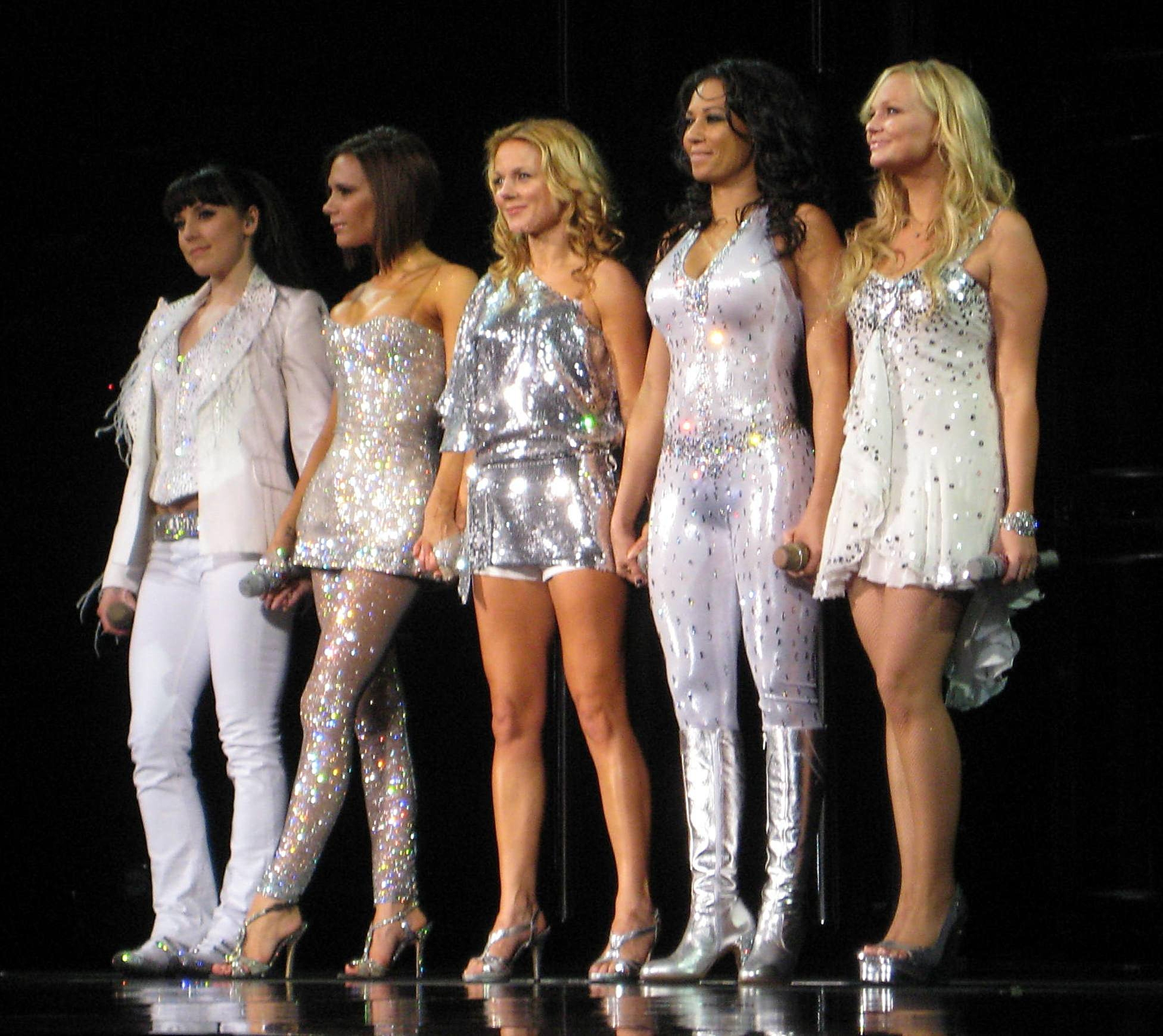
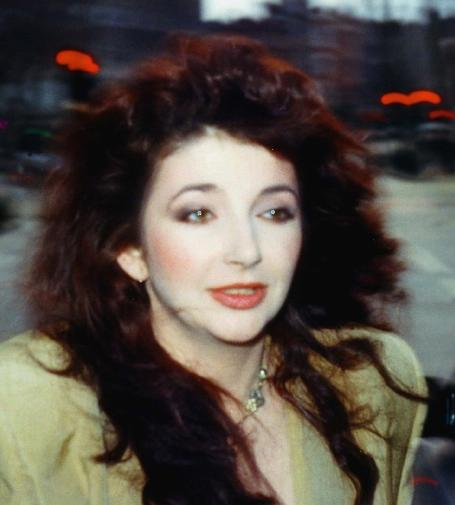
Charli XCX's musical influences include major artists such as (left to right) Britney Spears, Spice Girls, and Kate Bush.

Charli XCX's influences include Britney Spears, Shampoo, No Doubt, t.A.T.u., the Donnas, Bikini Kill, Martika, Björk, Siouxsie and the Banshees, the Feminine Complex, Donna Summer, Bread, All Saints, Uffie, Brooke Candy, Lil Wayne, Lily Allen, Kate Bush, Twin Peaks, Paris Hilton, Justice, Crystal Castles, Calvin Harris, Daft Punk, Sebastian, Honey Dijon, Robyn, Arca, M.I.A., Autechre, Aphex Twin, and Quentin Tarantino. She has also named Rihanna as her "favorite pop girl" and hopes to write a song for her. In 2017, Charli XCX said she aspired to write songs for Katy Perry and Gwen Stefani. She has said that True Romance was based on "Martika, and also the Cure and Britney", while influences of Belinda Carlisle, Marina and the Knife were noted by critics. She cited Kanye West as an inspiration for her idiosyncratic use of Auto-Tune. She has said that "the best artists are the ones who constantly change – Madonna, Bowie" and that her "dream collaboration would be with someone like Björk, Kate Bush, or even Dionne Warwick".

Charli XCX has named Siouxsie Sioux as "my hero." She also said that she learned about performing and attracting a crowd from Taylor Swift. Charli XCX's live performances have been noted for the apparent influence of the rave scene. She frequently performs with guest stars during her live shows. Charli XCX named her collaborators A. G. Cook, Caroline Polachek, Rina Sawayama, and Sophie as inspirations for her live performances during Crash: The Live Tour.

Charli XCX has expressed her admiration for 1990s pop culture, which she prominently used as the inspiration for the video for her single "Break the Rules", her single "1999" and its music video, and her album Crash. She has also said that to her the 1990s are epitomised by "Spice Girls and Britney". She reiterated her love for the former after the release of the single "Spicy", which interpolates the group's single "Wannabe", and called the latter her "first big pop icon", whom she desired to emulate. Charli XCX also considers Spears's album Blackout one of her favourite records, ranking the album's song "Piece of Me" as her favourite Spears song. Other musicians Charli XCX admired during her childhood include Justin Timberlake and Christina Aguilera, and she named Aguilera's Stripped "one of my favourite albums ever". She has also cited Avril Lavigne and the fictional characters Cher Horowitz, Wednesday Addams and Nancy Downs as inspirations for her fashion style, which she describes as "90s schoolgirl". She wore ties during her adolescence to imitate Lavigne.

== Impact ==
Music critics and cultural commentators have frequently credited Charli XCX with bridging experimental underground electronic music and mainstream pop. Beginning with her mid-2010s collaborations with the London-based collective PC Music—most notably producer A. G. Cook and the late Sophie—she helped popularize the microgenre hyperpop, influencing a subsequent generation of alternative pop and electronic musicians. Journalists have noted that her collaborative mixtapes, particularly Pop 2 (2017), established a blueprint for genre-blurring pop that elevated queer, underground, and international artists alongside mainstream acts. The release of her sixth studio album, Brat, generated widespread cultural commentary and internet memes, dubbed "Brat Summer." The New York Times characterized the album's lime-green visual aesthetic and marketing campaign as a "Warholian art project on fame," noting its crossover into mainstream media and the 2024 United States presidential election after Kamala Harris's campaign adopted its branding. Later that year, Collins English Dictionary named "brat" its 2024 Word of the Year, defining it as a "confident, independent and hedonistic attitude." Cultural critics at The Guardian also credited her "candid, club-oriented persona" with shifting contemporary pop norms away from curated relatability towards self-aware ambition and hedonism.

== Personal life ==
Charli XCX experiences sound-to-colour synaesthesia. She has said, "I see music in colours. I love music that's black, pink, purple or red – but I hate music that's green, yellow or brown."

In light of racist comments about her Indian heritage and skin tone being labelled as "dirty", Charli XCX expressed pride in her Indian roots on Twitter, writing, "I am extremely proud of my Indian heritage. I love my roots and my family. Don't call me/anyone 'dirty' [because] of the colour of someone's skin." In 2024 she discussed her mixed heritage in an interview with Vogue Singapore, saying: "I grew up in two half-lives, I suppose. When I would go and visit my mum's family, I felt very Indian. It was all the classic scenes of my nani and bappa cooking with Bollywood films playing in the background and everybody speaking in Gujarati ... But then I'd go home to this other world which was largely white. It was almost like I would experience the Indian part of my identity only on the weekends. I never quite felt like I fit into either world, which I think commonly happens with mixed-race kids."

Until 2022, Charli XCX was in a long-term partnership with Huck Kwong, whom she had previously dated in 2014 and been friends with since 2012. In 2022, she began publicly dating British musician George Daniel, the drummer for the alternative band the 1975. The couple met while working on the No Rome track "Spinning", released on 4 March 2021, and they collaborated again on her album Crash, released on 18 March 2022, on the album's title track and several songs on its deluxe edition. They became engaged in November 2023. Charli XCX and Daniel married at the Hackney Town Hall on 19 July 2025. The intimate ceremony was attended by a small group of people, including Charli XCX's parents and Daniel's bandmates from the 1975; lead vocalist Matty Healy was absent due to other obligations. On 14 September 2025, the pair had a second wedding in Scopello, Sicily, attended by friends and family.

As of February 2017, Charli XCX divides her time between London and Los Angeles.

In a 2019 interview with Glamour, Charli XCX said she is "not religious at all".

In February 2026, during an interview on the podcast SmartLess, Charli XCX said that she does not really want to have children. One of the hosts, Jason Bateman, was criticised for questioning her decision.

In June 2026, Charli XCX said that she "recently [has] been really struggling with [her] mental health", and that she is "in the worst place mentally that [she's] been in [her] life."

== Discography ==
Studio albums

- True Romance (2013)
- Sucker (2014)
- Charli (2019)
- How I'm Feeling Now (2020)
- Crash (2022)
- Brat (2024)
- Wuthering Heights (2026)
- Music, Fashion, Film (2026)

== Tours ==
Headlining

- Girl Power North America Tour (2014)
- Charli Live Tour (2019–2020)
- Crash: The Live Tour (2022–2023)
- Brat Tour (2024–2025)
- Music, Fashion, Film Tour (2026–2027)

Co-headlining

- Charli and Jack Do America Tour (2015) (with Bleachers)
- Sweat (2024) (with Troye Sivan)

Supporting

- The Ting Tings – Show Us Yours Tour (2011)
- Sleigh Bells – Terror Tour (2012)
- Azealia Banks – Mermaid Ball (2012)
- Coldplay – Mylo Xyloto Tour (2012)
- Ellie Goulding – The Halcyon Days Tour (2013)
- Marina and the Diamonds – The Lonely Hearts Club Tour (2013)
- Paramore – The Self-Titled Tour (2013)
- Katy Perry – Prismatic World Tour (2015)
- Halsey – Hopeless Fountain Kingdom Tour (2017)
- Sia – Nostalgic for the Present Tour (2017)
- Taylor Swift – Reputation Stadium Tour (2018)

== Filmography ==
Key
†	Denotes films that have not yet been released

=== Film ===
Table featuring feature films with Charli XCX
Year	Title	Role	Notes	Ref(s)
2015	The F-Word and Me	Herself	Documentary	
2015	Lost in the North	Herself	Short film	
2015	The 1989 World Tour	Herself	Concert film	
2016	The Angry Birds Movie	Willow (voice)		
2018	Taylor Swift: Reputation Stadium Tour	Herself	Concert film	
2019	UglyDolls	Kitty (voice)		
2022	Charli XCX: Alone Together	Herself	Documentary	
2025	Erupcja	Bethany	Also screenwriter and producer	
2025	100 Nights of Hero	Rosa		
2025	Sacrifice	Mother Nature	Cameo	
2026	The Moment	Herself	Also story writer and producer	
2026	I Want Your Sex	Minerva		
2026	The Gallerist	Alex		
2026	Faces of Death	Gabby		
TBA	Untitled Takashi Miike film †	Katie	Filming; Also producer	
TBA	What Happens at Night †		Post-production	

=== Television ===
Table featuring programs of television with Charli XCX
Year	Title	Role	Notes	Ref(s)
2014–2025	Saturday Night Live	Herself / Host / Musical guest / Sally	Episode: "Martin Freeman/Charli XCX"; Episode: "Oscar Isaac/Charli XCX"; Episode: "Charli XCX"; Episode: "Amy Poehler/Role Model"	
2015	Major Lazer	Lady Vanessa Rothchild	Voice role Episode: "Throwback Thursdays"	
2015	Late Show with David Letterman	Herself	Episode: "Anna Kendrick/Charli XCX"	
2015	The Ride: Charli XCX	Herself	Main role	
2015	The Graham Norton Show	Herself	Episode: "Jamie Dornan/Julie Walters/Stephen Mangan/Charli XCX/Rita Ora"	
2015–2017	Jimmy Kimmel Live!	Herself	Episode: "Mila Kunis/Bob Odenkirk/Charli XCX"; Episode: "Will Arnett/Gabrielle Union/Charli XCX"	
2017	Celebrity Juice	Herself	Episode: "#18.1"	
2018	Lip Sync Battle	Herself	[[Episode: "Rita Ora vs. Charli XCX" {{{last}}}]]	
2018	The Tonight Show Starring Jimmy Fallon	Herself	5 episodes	
2019	I'm with the Band: Nasty Cherry	Herself	Netflix docuseries	
2021	RuPaul's Drag Race All Stars	Guest judge	Season 6, episodes 9–10	
2022	Gossip Girl	Herself	Episode: "One Flew Over the Cucks's Nest"	
2025	Overcompensating	Herself	Episode: "Boom Clap"	

=== Composer ===
Table featuring composer with Charli XCX
Year	Title	Notes	Ref(s)
2023	Bottoms	Feature film Composed with Leo Birenberg	
2026	Wuthering Heights	Feature film Composed with Anthony Willis	
2026	Mother Mary	Feature film Composed with Jack Antonoff and Daniel Hart	

=== Producer ===
Table featuring composer with Charli XCX
Year	Title	Notes	Ref(s)
2025–present	Overcompensating	TV series Executive producer	
2026	The Moment	Feature film Co-produced with David Hinojosa	

=== Podcast ===
Table featuring podcast with Charli XCX
Year	Title	Role	Notes	Ref(s)
2021	How Long Gone	Herself	Guest	
2021–2022	Charli XCX's Best Song Ever	Herself	Host	
2022	Dua Lipa: At Your Service	Herself	Guest	
2022	Five Things with Lynn Hirschberg	Herself	Guest	
2024	Anything Goes with Emma Chamberlain	Herself	Guest	
2024	Las Culturistas	Herself	Guest	

== See also ==
- List of British Grammy winners and nominees
