= List of best-selling singles in the United States =

This list compiles the best-selling singles in the United States, based on reported sales figures. Some of the singles have been certified by the Recording Industry Association of America (RIAA). In music, a single is a song considered commercially viable enough by the artist and record company to be released separately from an album, usually featured on an album as well. For more information, see single.

- The RIAA certifies a record only if that record company pays for its official certification; some companies do not consider this an important distinction and will not request certifications unless pressed by its active, still saleable artists. A full and complete list of RIAA-certified recordings would be a very incomplete list of popular American music.
- The RIAA only certifies a particular recording of a song. Remixes, live and other versions count as separate.
- Prior to 1989, physical singles were awarded with a Gold certification for shipments of 1,000,000 units and a Platinum certification for shipments of 2,000,000 units. For certification dates since January 1, 1989, a Gold award represented shipments of 500,000 units and a Platinum award represented shipments of 1,000,000 units.
- Since May 9, 2013, RIAA certifications for singles in the "digital" category include on-demand audio and/or video song streams in addition to downloads. The current formula since February 1, 2016 is 150 on-demand streams = 1 song download.
- Physical sales figures backed by RIAA certifications may be inaccurate as physical singles can be "overcertified" (sell less copies than were shipped to stores) or "undercertified" (sell beyond their current certification level and not receive a new certification).

== Physical singles ==
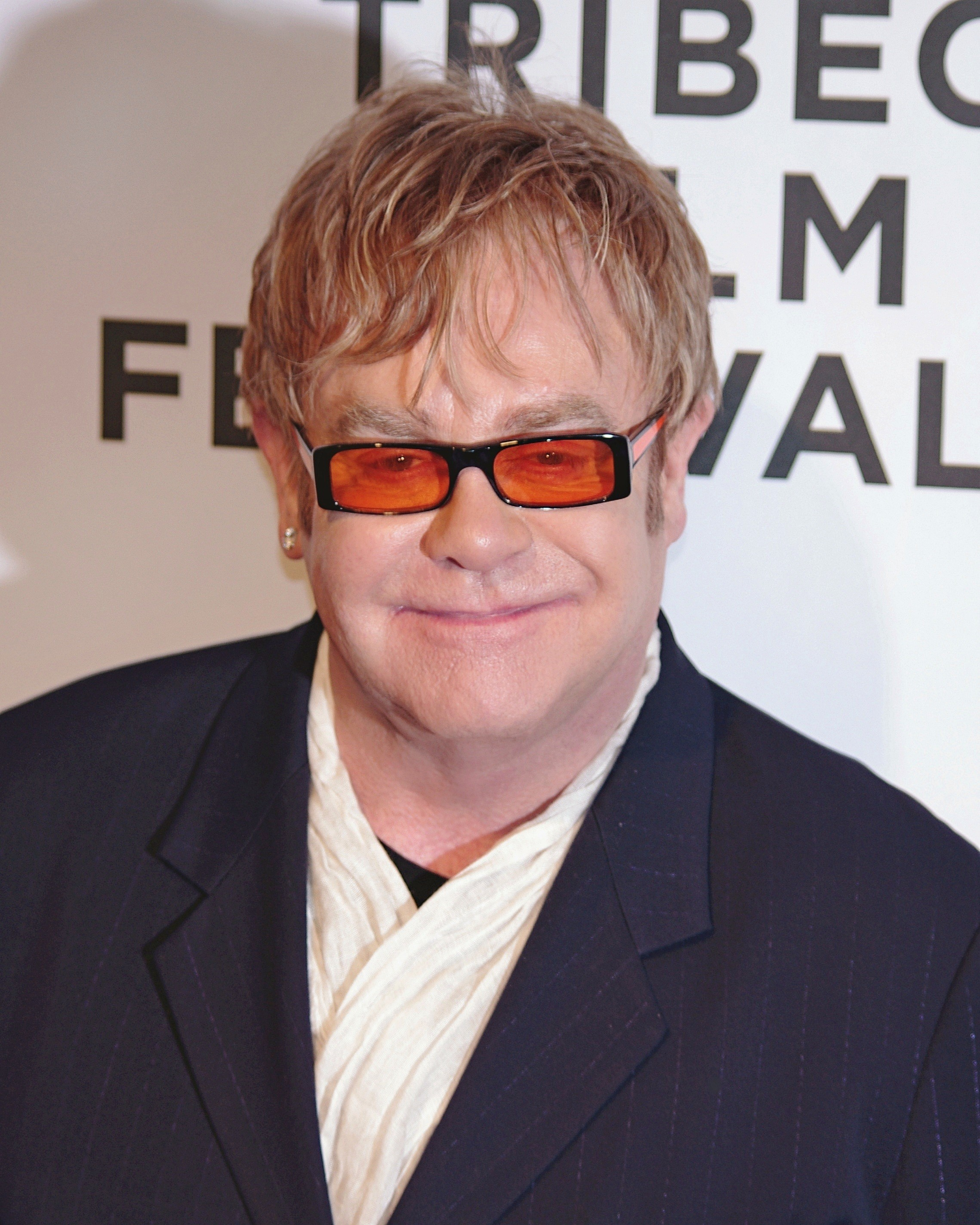
Elton John's "Candle in the Wind 1997" is the best-selling physical single in the United States since Nielsen SoundScan began tracking music sales in 1991.

All of these physical singles have sold over four million copies according to either reliable third-party claims or RIAA multi-platinum certifications.

Song	Artist(s)	Release year	Claimed sales (million) (Note: For those where sales figures are not cited, sales figures are based on certified amounts by the Recording Industry Association of America (RIAA).)	No. of times Platinum
"White Christmas"	Bing Crosby	1941	12	None
"Candle in the Wind 1997"	Elton John	1997	8.84	11×
"We Are the World"	USA for Africa	1985	8	4×
"Rudolph, the Red-Nosed Reindeer"	Gene Autry	1949	7	None
"Paper Doll"	The Mills Brothers	1943	6	None
"The Tennessee Waltz"	Patti Page	1948	6	None
"Hound Dog" / "Don't Be Cruel"	Elvis Presley	1956	5	4×
"It's Now or Never"	Elvis Presley	1960	5	1×
"I Want to Hold Your Hand"	The Beatles	1963	5	Gold
"That Silver Haired Daddy of Mine"	Gene Autry	1935	5	None
"The Ballad of the Green Berets"	Barry Sadler	1966	5	None
"Dardanella"	Ben Selvin	1919	5	None
"My Blue Heaven"	Gene Austin	1928	5	None
"I Will Always Love You"	Whitney Houston	1992	4.59	4×
"(Everything I Do) I Do It for You"	Bryan Adams	1991	4.1	3×
"Macarena"	Los del Río	1996	4	4×
"Le Freak"	Chic	1978	4	1×
"I Heard It Through the Grapevine"	Marvin Gaye	1968	4	None
"I'm a Believer"	The Monkees	1966	4	None
"You Light Up My Life"	Debby Boone	1977	4	1×
"Hey Jude"	The Beatles	1968	4	4×
"Whoomp! (There It Is)"	Tag Team	1993	4	4×

== Digital singles ==
The below singles have sold at least 6 million digital copies as reported by Luminate (or previously Nielsen SoundScan). Sales figures are not fully represented by RIAA certifications, which have included on-demand streaming-equivalent units since May 2013. Thus the actual sales figures will be different from the amounts specified by the RIAA.

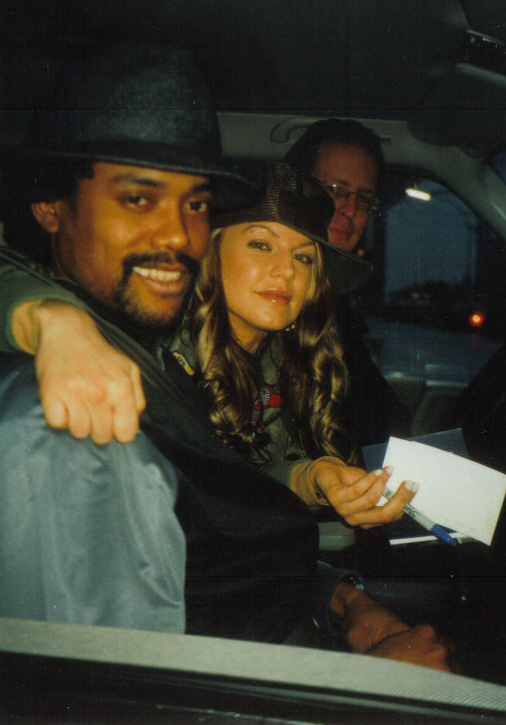
"I Gotta Feeling" by the Black Eyed Peas is the best-selling digital single in the U.S., with over 8.7 million downloads sold.

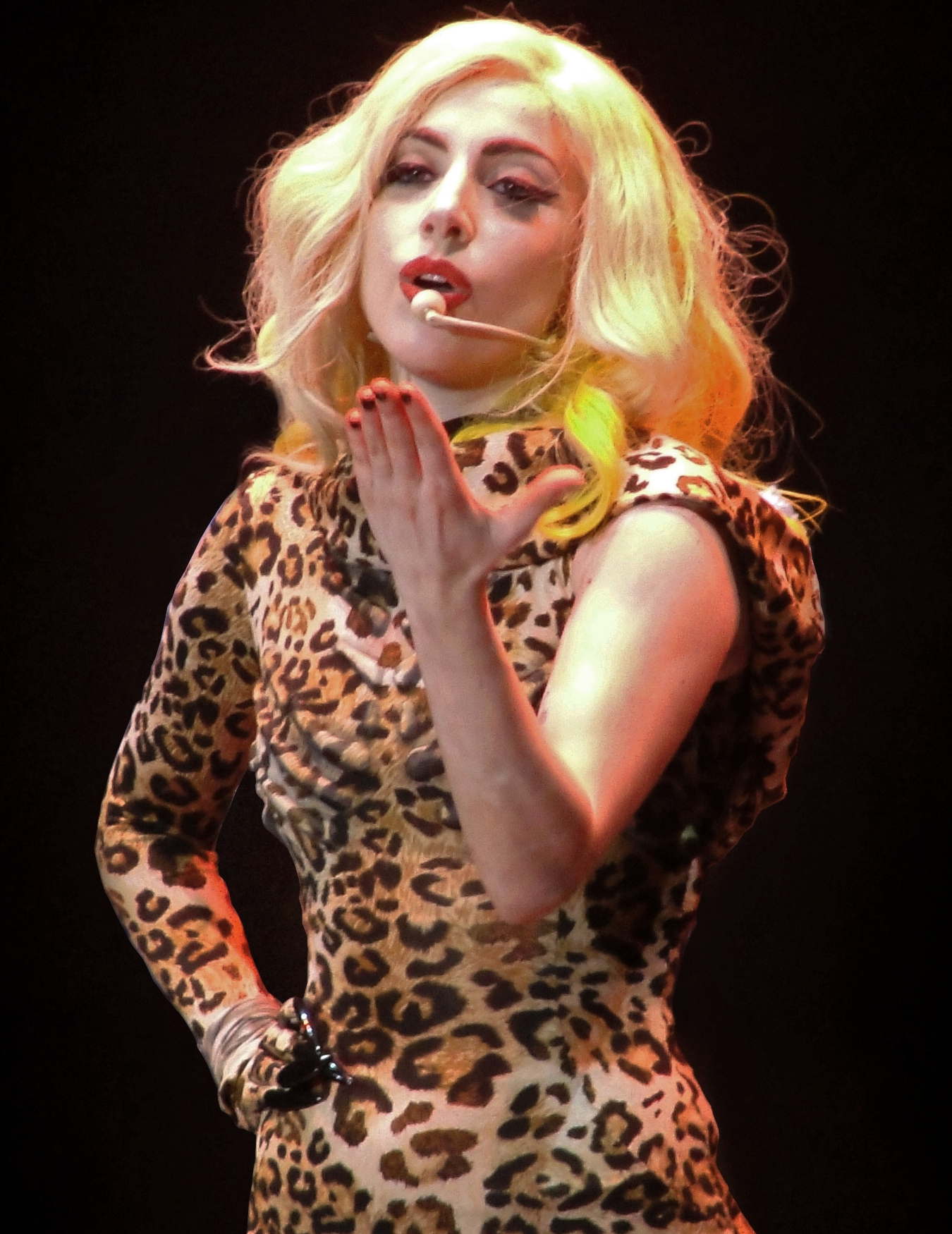
Lady Gaga is the first artist to have two 7-million-selling digital singles.

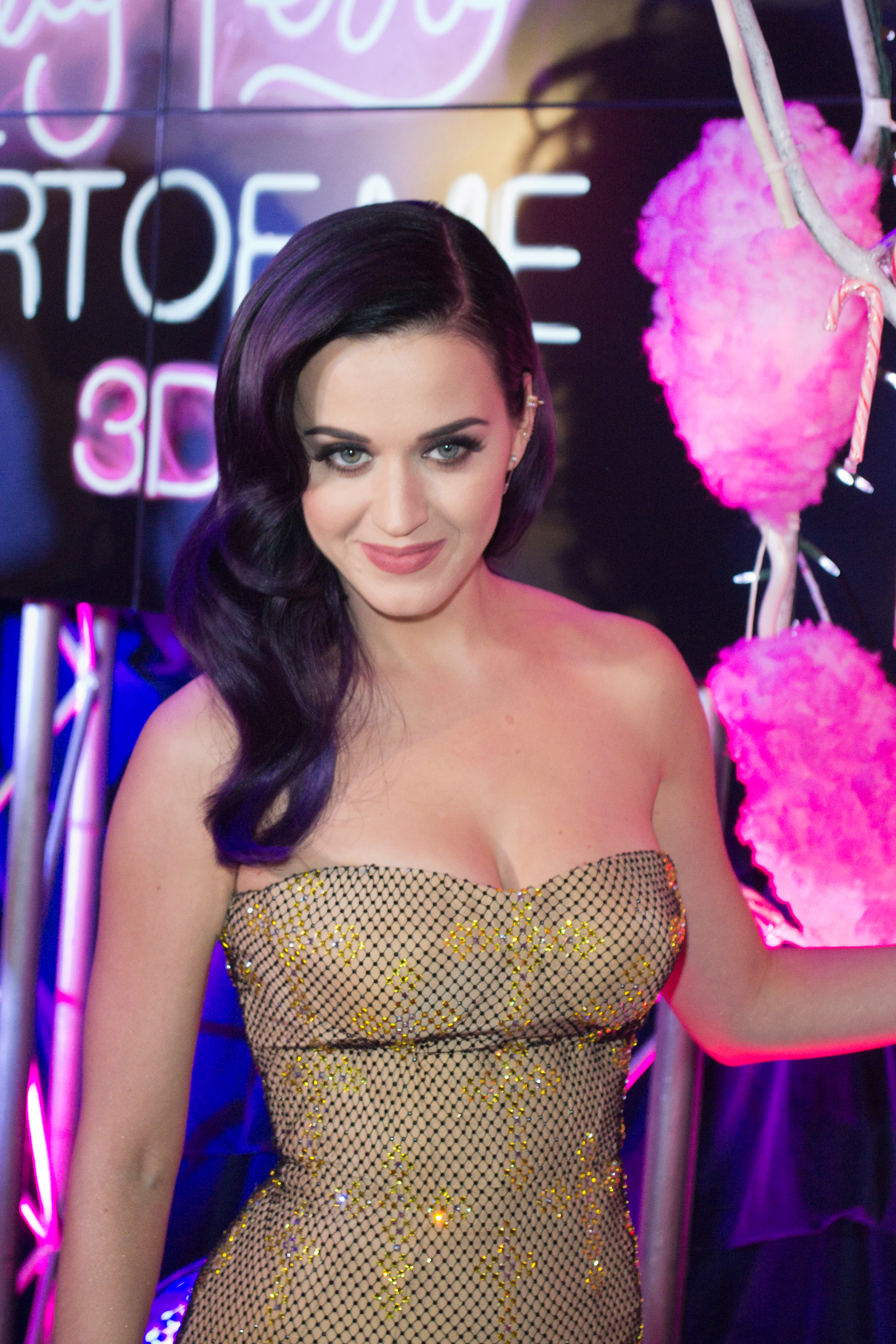
Katy Perry is the first artist to have three 6-million-selling digital singles.

Song	Artist(s)	Release year	Reported sales (million)	No. of times Platinum
"I Gotta Feeling"	The Black Eyed Peas	2009	8.7	15×
"Rolling in the Deep"	Adele	2010	8.4	8×
"Radioactive"	Imagine Dragons	2012	8.2	16×
"Uptown Funk"	Mark Ronson featuring Bruno Mars	2014	8.1	11×
"Party Rock Anthem"	LMFAO featuring Lauren Bennett and GoonRock	2011	8.1	10×
"Somebody That I Used to Know"	Gotye featuring Kimbra	2011	7.9	14×
"Cruise"	Florida Georgia Line	2012	7.6	14×
"Call Me Maybe"	Carly Rae Jepsen	2011	7.6	10×
"Poker Face"	Lady Gaga	2008	7.5	10×
"Lose Yourself"	Eminem	2002	7.4	13×
"Firework"	Katy Perry	2010	7.2	12×
"Just Dance"	Lady Gaga featuring Colby O'Donis	2008	7.2	11×
"Don't Stop Believin'"	Journey	1981	7.0	18×
"Just the Way You Are"	Bruno Mars	2010	7.0	21×
"Low"	Flo Rida featuring T-Pain	2007	7.0	10×
"Happy"	Pharrell Williams	2013	6.9	11×
"Boom Boom Pow"	The Black Eyed Peas	2008	6.9	10×
"I'm Yours"	Jason Mraz	2008	6.8	13×
"We Are Young"	fun. featuring Janelle Monáe	2011	6.8	10×
"Tik Tok"	Kesha	2009	6.8	12×
"Need You Now"	Lady Antebellum	2009	6.7	12×
"Moves like Jagger"	Maroon 5 featuring Christina Aguilera	2011	6.7	10×
"Viva la Vida"	Coldplay	2008	6.6	5×
"Love the Way You Lie"	Eminem featuring Rihanna	2010	6.5	13×
"Blurred Lines"	Robin Thicke featuring T.I. and Pharrell Williams	2013	6.5	10×
"Hey, Soul Sister"	Train	2009	6.4	11×
"Roar"	Katy Perry	2013	6.4	15×
"Sexy and I Know It"	LMFAO	2011	6.4	8×
"Party in the U.S.A."	Miley Cyrus	2009	6.3	15×
"Dark Horse"	Katy Perry featuring Juicy J	2013	6.3	11×
"Thrift Shop"	Macklemore & Ryan Lewis featuring Wanz	2013	6.2	10×
"Love Story"	Taylor Swift	2008	6.2	8×
"Sail"	Awolnation	2010	6.1	10×
"Grenade"	Bruno Mars	2010	6.1	16×
"Thinking Out Loud"	Ed Sheeran	2014	6.0	18×
"All of Me"	John Legend	2013	6.0	14×
"Fuck You / Forget You"	CeeLo Green	2010	6.0	7×
"Someone like You"	Adele	2011	6.0	5×
"Apologize"	Timbaland featuring OneRepublic	2007	6.0	4×

== See also ==
- RIAA certification
- List of highest-certified music artists in the United States
- List of highest-certified digital singles in the United States
- List of best-selling singles
- List of best-selling singles of 2014 in the United States
- List of best-selling albums in the United States
- List of Spotify streaming records
