= List of highest-certified music artists in the United States =

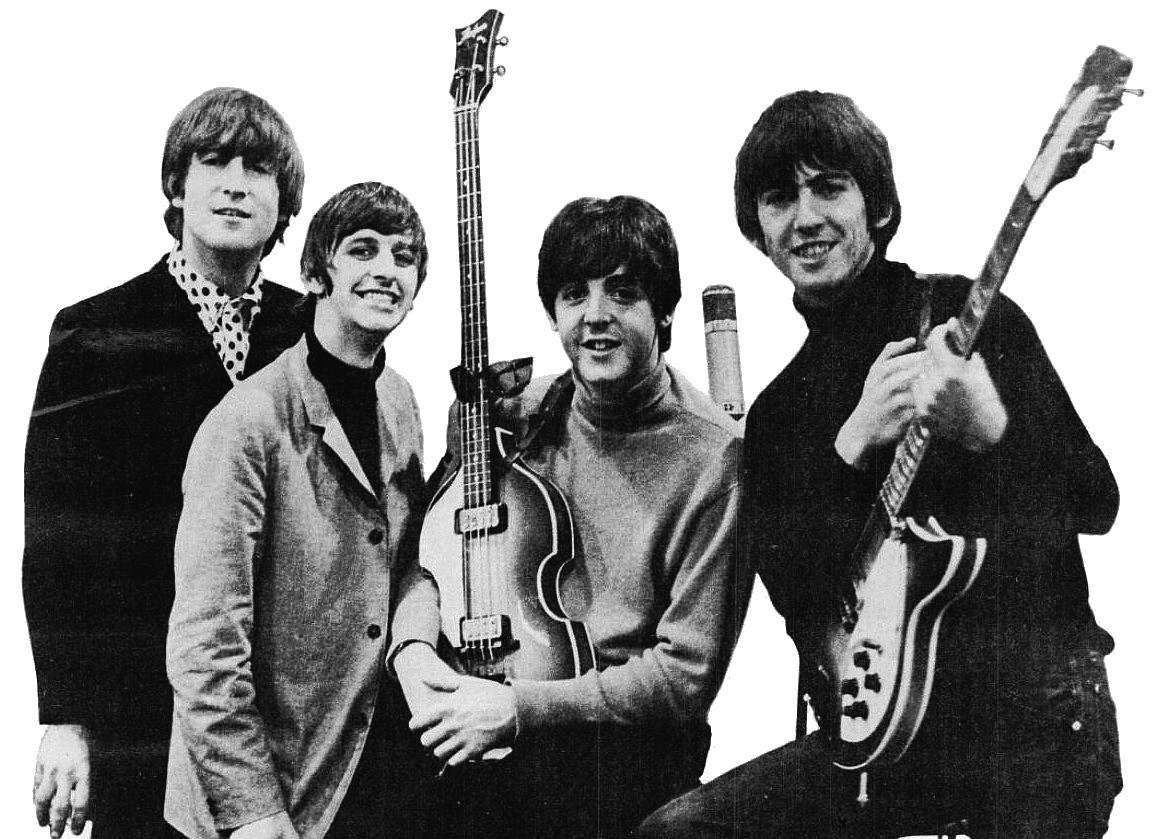
The Beatles is the highest-certified album band in the United States with a total of 183 million certified album-equivalent units.

This is the list of the highest-certified music artists in the United States based on certifications of albums and digital singles (but not physical singles) by the Recording Industry Association of America (RIAA). RIAA certifications are based on wholesale shipments rather than retail sales. Since 2016, the RIAA album certification has also included on-demand audio/video streams (1,500 streams = 1 album unit) and track sale equivalent (10 track sales = 1 album unit). Additionally, awards are presented only if and when a record company applies for certification. Therefore, the total certified units for a given artist may be incomplete or out of date.

The RIAA began its certifications in 1958, therefore, popular artists from earlier eras are generally not represented on this list. As of January 20, 2026, the Beatles is the highest-certified band in the United States with a total of 183 million certified album-equivalent units. Garth Brooks is the highest-certified solo artist and Taylor Swift is the highest-certified female artist. Meanwhile, Drake remains the highest-certified digital singles artist, with 276 million certified units as a lead artist.

== Top 100 certified music artists ==
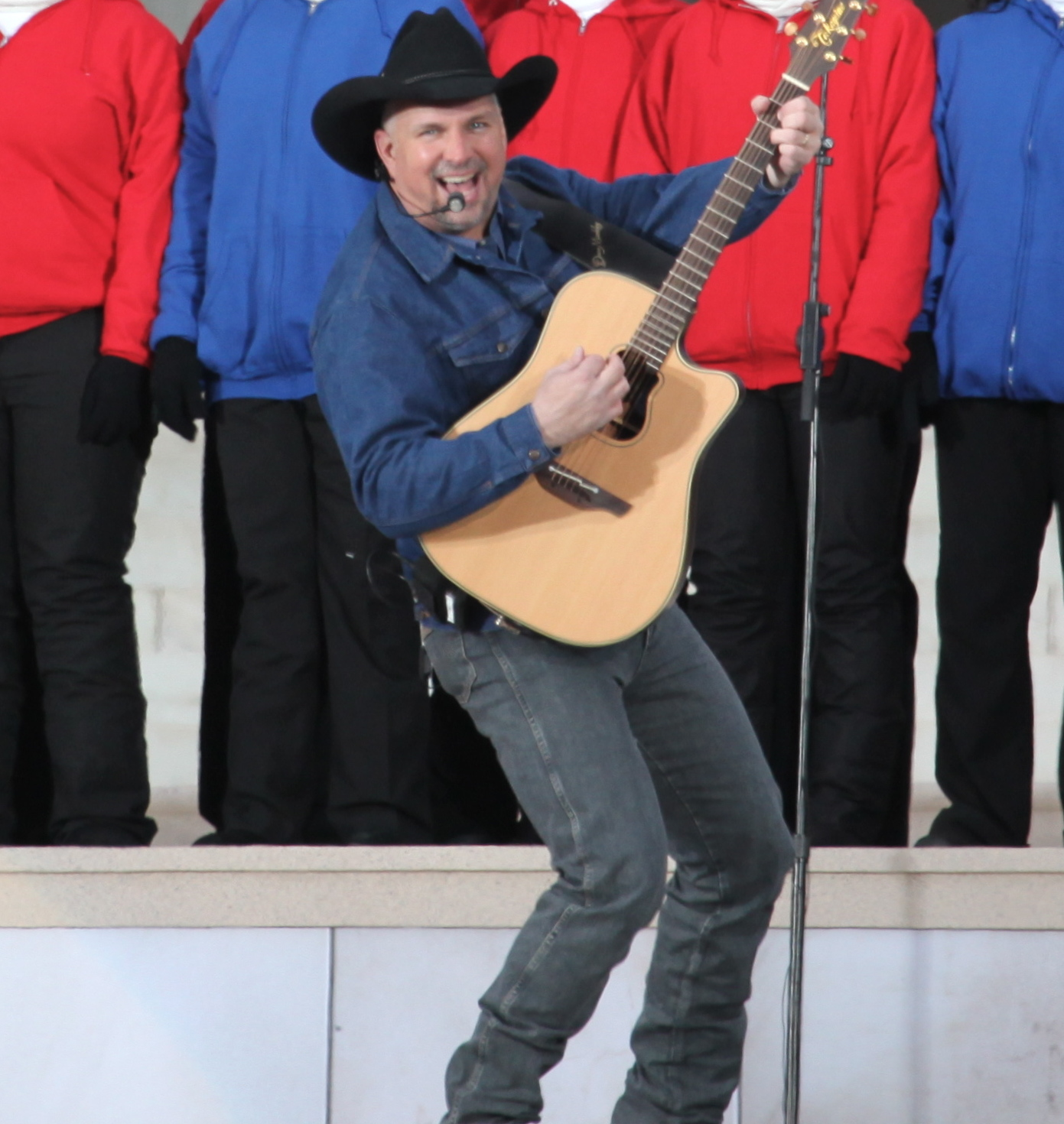
Garth Brooks

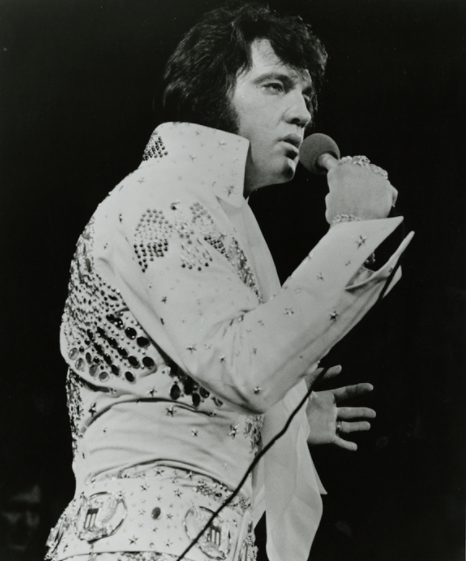
Elvis Presley

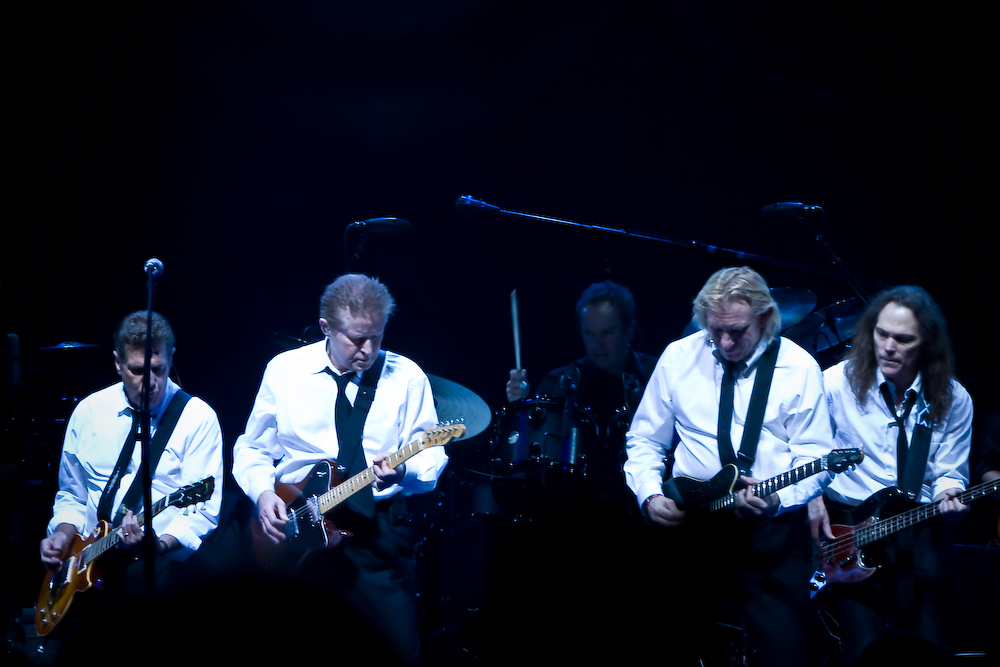
Eagles

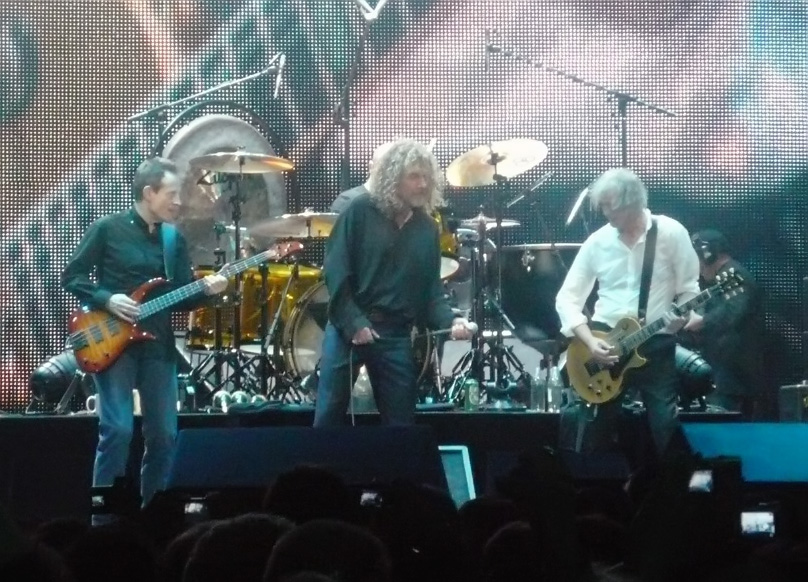
Led Zeppelin

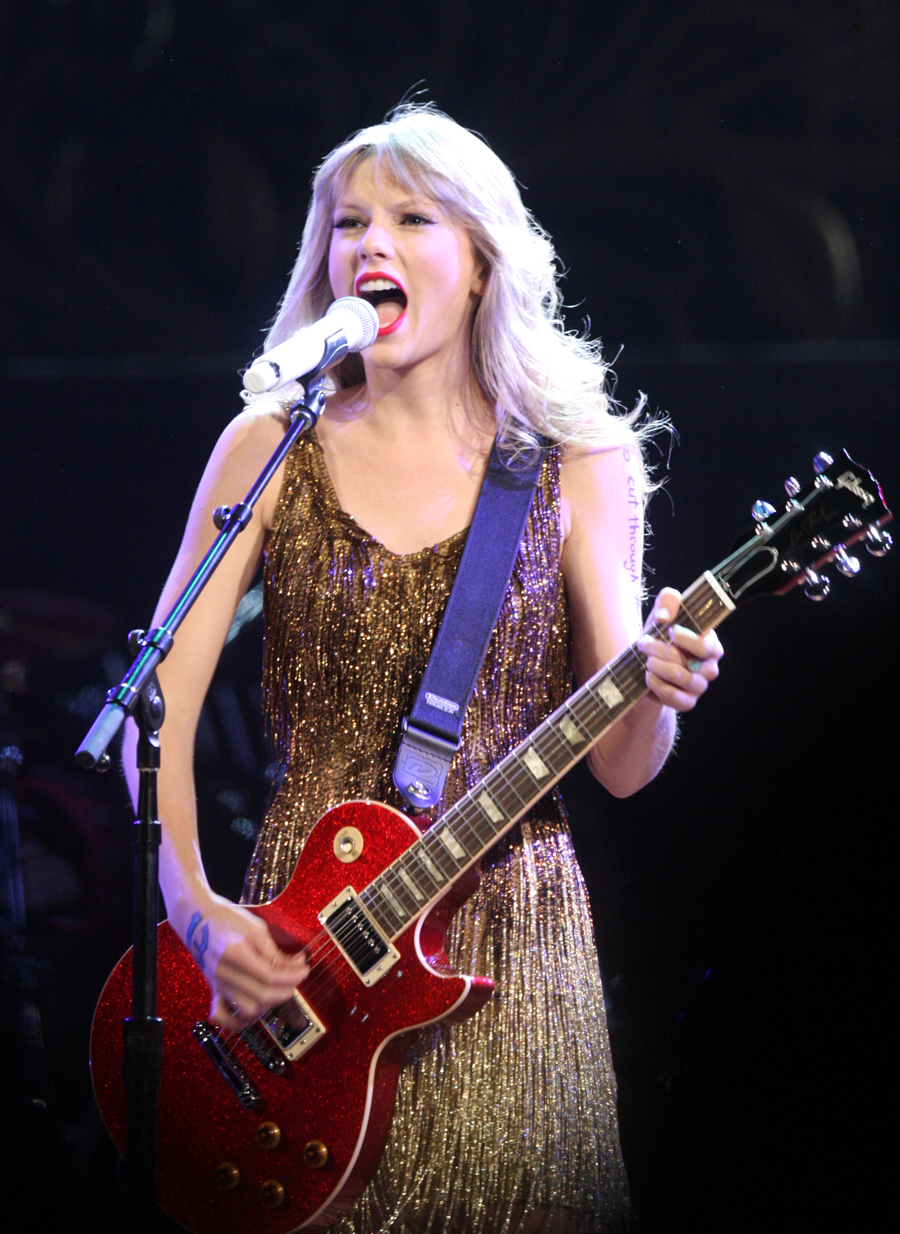
Taylor Swift

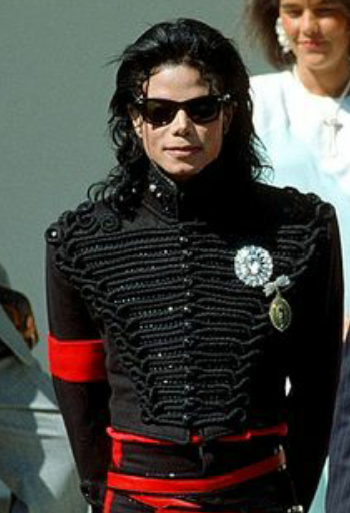
Michael Jackson

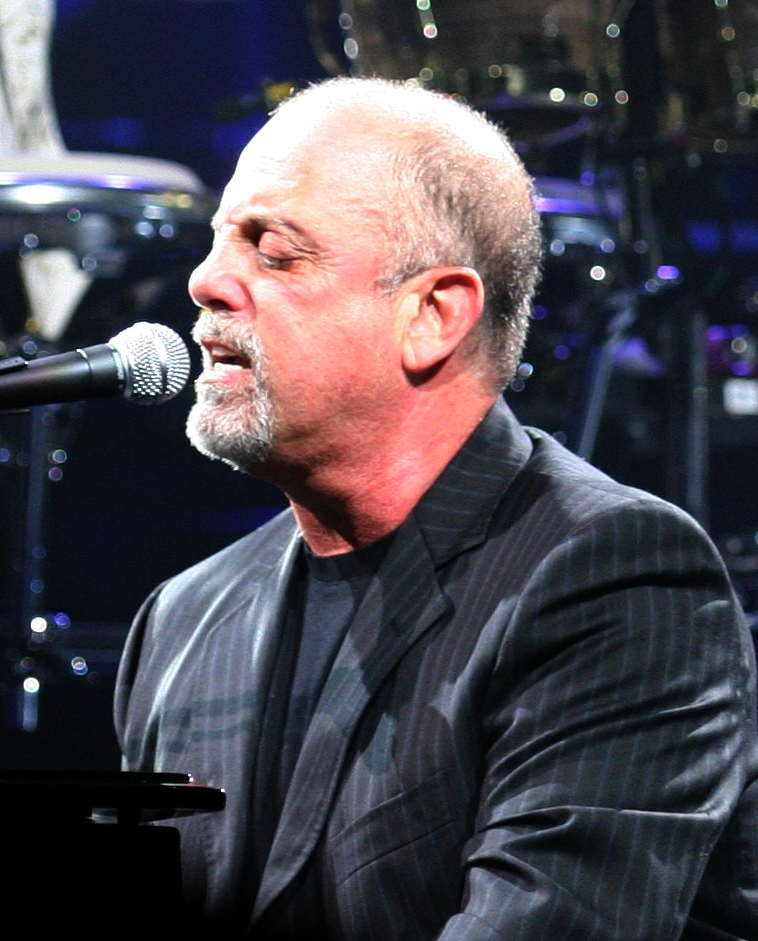
Billy Joel

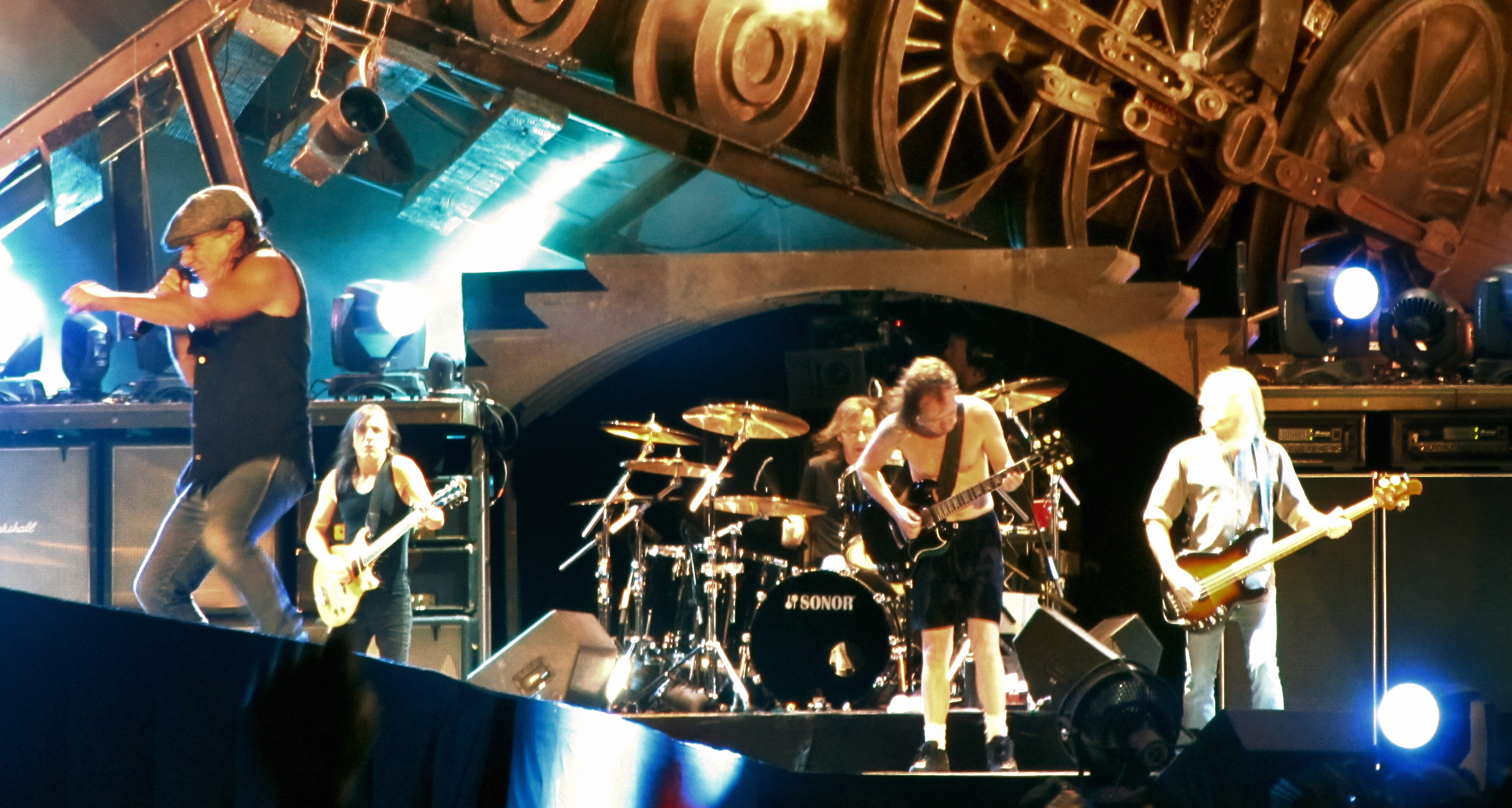
AC/DC

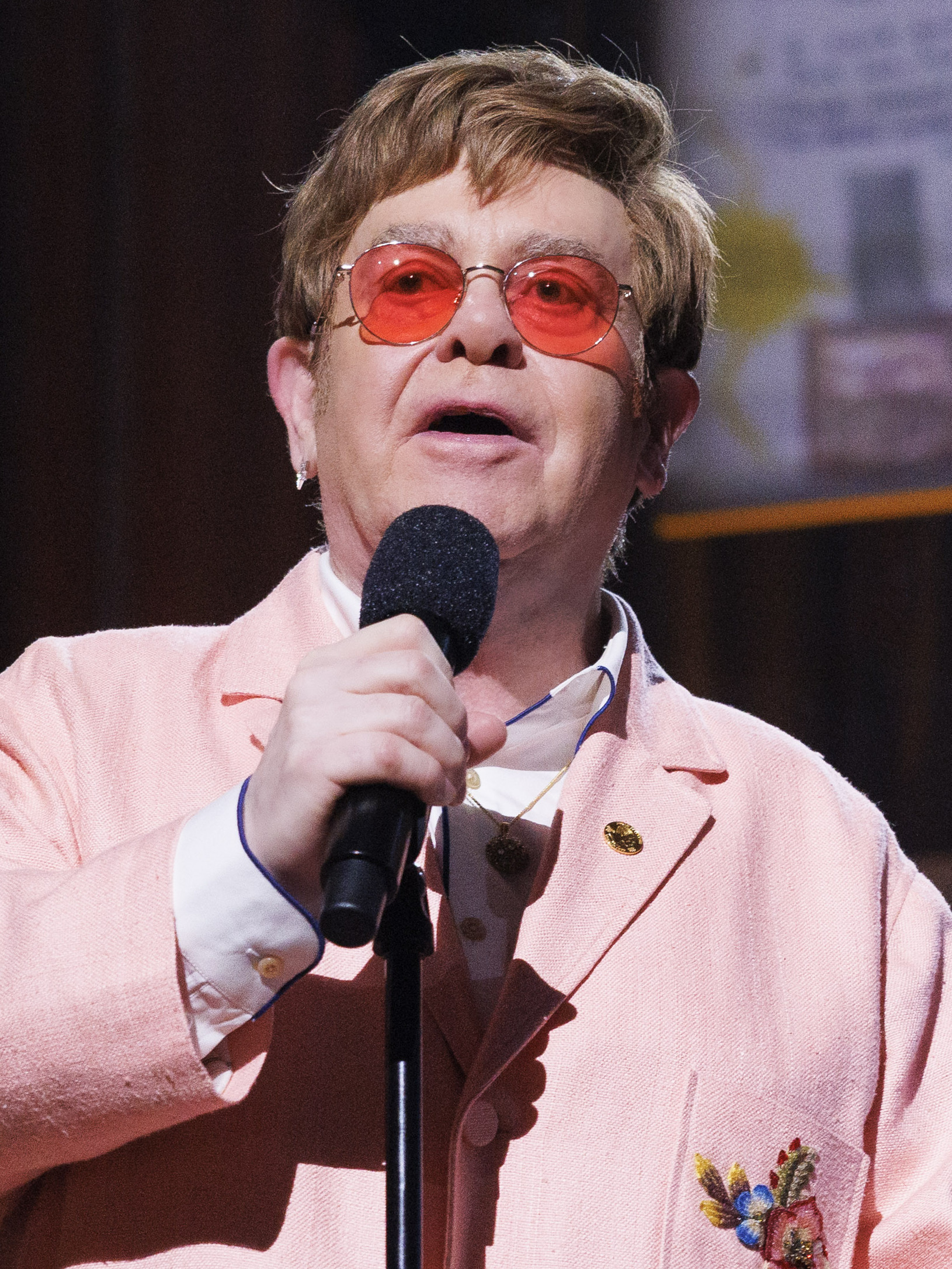
Elton John

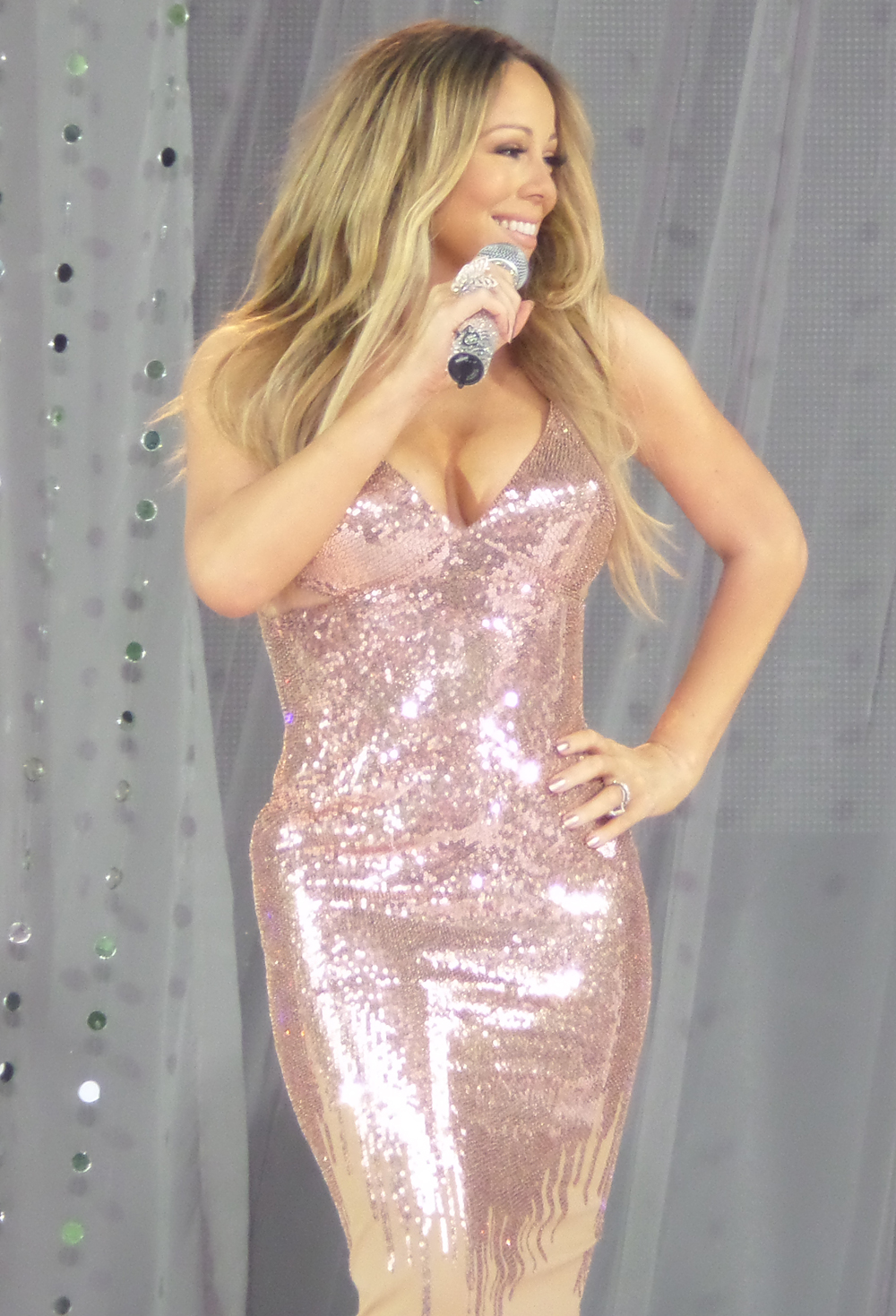
Mariah Carey

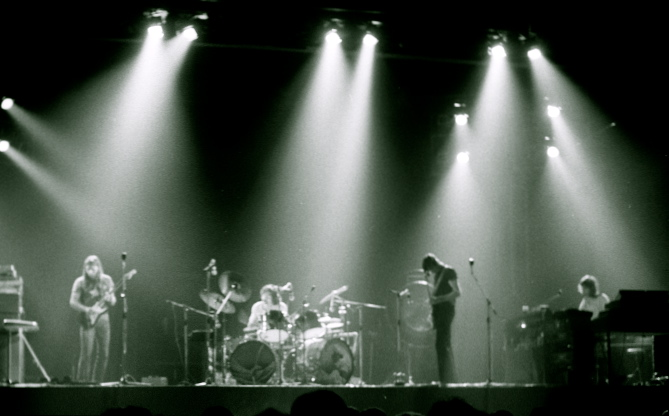
Pink Floyd

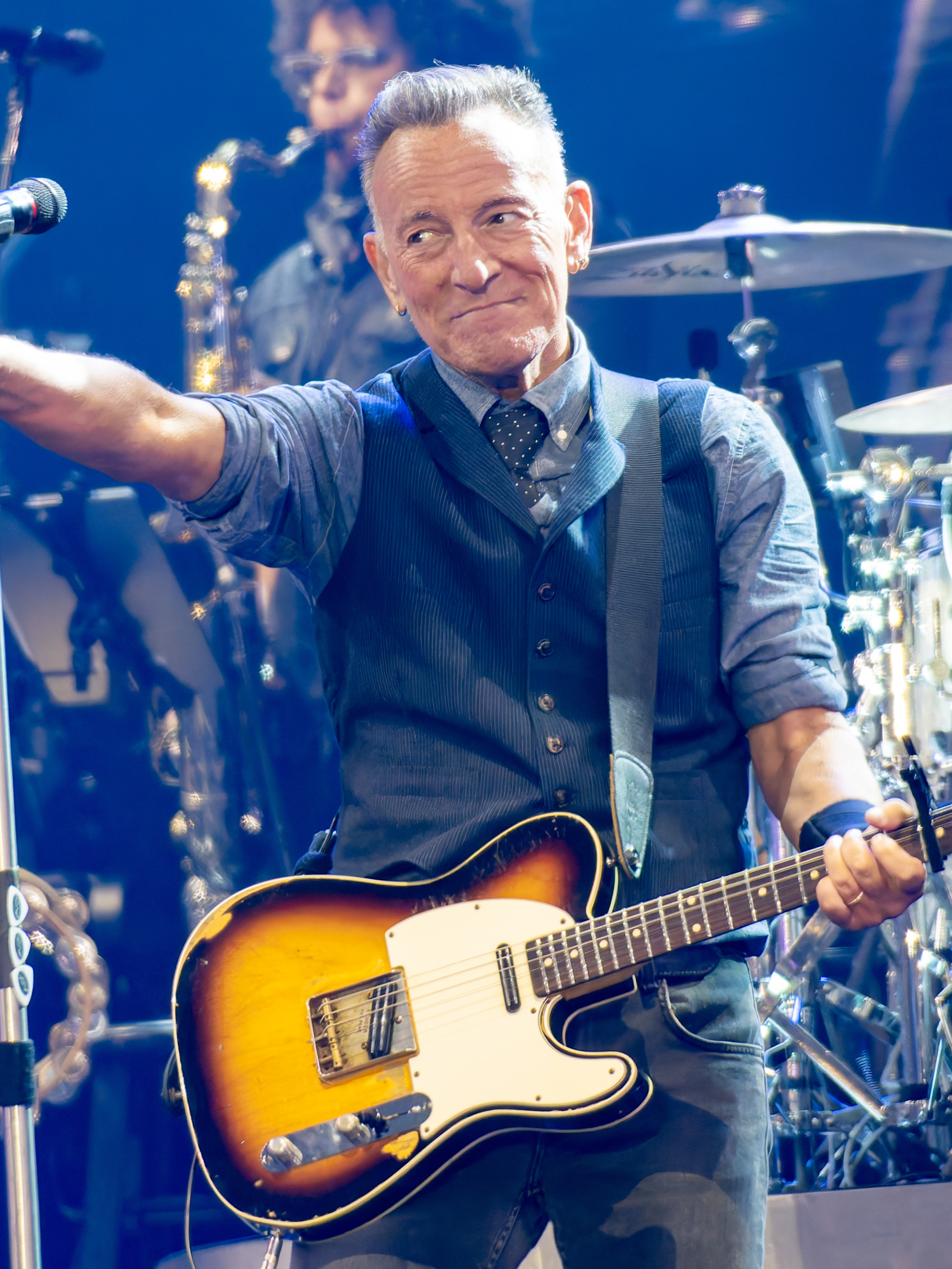
Bruce Springsteen

The following is a list of 100 highest-certified artists in the United States based on album-equivalent units, which include physical album shipments, digital album downloads, as well as individual song downloads and streams. However, sales of physical singles are not counted for album-equivalent units, which do not favor artists with a large catalog of physical singles such as Elvis Presley and Madonna. Artists with album certifications prior to 2016 also do not get benefit of the inclusion of individual song downloads and streams. The highest-certified music artists do not necessarily mean the highest-selling music artists, due to the fact that certifications are not automatic and record companies have to apply. The RIAA's figures may also differ with Luminate and Billboard's ones due to different weighting ratios of streaming. The RIAA counts 1,500 streams as one album unit (regardless of free or paid streams, audio or video streams), while Billboard counts 1,250 premium audio streams, 3,750 ad-supported streams, or 3,750 video streams as one album unit. As of January 2, 2026, Billboard counts 2,500 ad-supported or 1,000 premium on-demand official audio and video streams as one album unit.

List of 100 artists with the highest-certified album-equivalent units as of November 30, 2025
Rank	Units (millions)	Name	Nat.	Active
1	200	Garth Brooks	US	1980s–2020s
2	183	The Beatles	UK	1960s–1970s^{d}
3	146.5	Elvis Presley	US	1950s–1970s^{†}
4	120	Eagles	US	1970s–2020s
5	112.5	Led Zeppelin	UK	1960s–1980s^{d}
6	110	Taylor Swift	US	2000s–2020s
7	90	Michael Jackson	US	1970s–2000s^{†}
8	89	Billy Joel	US	1970s–2020s
9	84	AC/DC	Australia	1970s–2020s
10	81	Elton John	UK	1960s–2020s
11	76	Mariah Carey	US	1990s–2020s
12	75	Pink Floyd	UK	1960s–2010s^{d}
13	71	Bruce Springsteen	US	1970s–2020s
13	71	Metallica	US	1980s–2020s
15	69.5	Aerosmith	US	1970s–2020s
15	69.5	George Strait	US	1980s–2020s
17	68.5	Barbra Streisand	US	1960s–2010s
18	66.5	The Rolling Stones	UK	1960s–2020s
19	65.5	Madonna	US	1980s–2020s
20	62	Whitney Houston	US	1980s–2010s^{†}
21	61.5	Eminem	US	1990s–2020s
22	57.5	Fleetwood Mac	UK	1960s–2010s
23	56.5	Van Halen	US	1970s–2020s^{d}
24	53	Celine Dion	Canada	1990s–2020s
25	52.5	Journey	US	1970s–2020s
26	52	U2	Ireland	1970s–2010s
27	49.5	Neil Diamond	US	1960s–2020s
28	49	Alabama	US	1970s–2020s
29	48	Kenny G	US	1980s–2020s
29	48	Shania Twain	Canada	1990s–2020s
31	47.5	Drake	Canada	2000s–2020s
31	47.5	Kenny Rogers	US	1950s–2000s^{†}
33	44.5	Alan Jackson	US	1980s–2020s
33	44.5	Bob Seger & the Silver Bullet Band	US	1960s–2020s
33	44.5	Guns N' Roses	US	1980s–2020s
36	43.5	Santana	US	1960s–2020s
7	108	Queen	UK	1970s–2020s
38	41	Reba McEntire	US	1970s–2020s
38	41	Bon Jovi	US	1980s–2020s
40	40	Eric Clapton	UK	1960s–2020s
40	40	Tim McGraw	US	1990s–2020s
42	39	Chicago	US	1960s–2020s
43	38.5	Britney Spears	US	1990s–2020s
43	38.5	Simon & Garfunkel	US	1960s–2010s^{d}
45	38	Foreigner	US	1970s–2020s
45	38	Rod Stewart	UK	1960s–2020s
47	37	Backstreet Boys	US	1990s–2020s
47	37	Beyoncé	US	2000s–2020s
49	36.5	Tupac Shakur	US	1990s^{†}
50	36	Bob Dylan	US	1960s–2020s
51	35.5	Def Leppard	UK	1970s–2020s
52	35	Kenny Chesney	US	1990s–2020s
53	34.5	Dave Matthews Band	US	1990s–2020s
54	34	Green Day	US	1980s–2020s
54	34	The Doors	US	1960s–1970s^{d}
55	33.5	Jay-Z	US	1990s–2010s
55	33.5	John Denver	US	1960s–1990s^{†}
55	33.5	Phil Collins	UK	1970s–2020s
58	33	James Taylor	US	1960s–2020s
58	33	The Chicks	US	1980s–2020s
58	33	Usher	US	1990s–2020s
61	32	R. Kelly	US	1990s–2010s
62	31.5	Pearl Jam	US	1990s–2020s
62	31.5	Tom Petty and the Heartbreakers	US	1970s–2010s^{†}
62	31.5	Willie Nelson	US	1950s–2020s
65	31	Boston	US	1970s–2010s
66	30.5	Linkin Park	US	1990s–2020s
67	30	Creedence Clearwater Revival	US	1960s–1970s^{d}
67	30	Linda Ronstadt	US	1960s–2010s
69	29.75	Ozzy Osbourne	UK	1960s–2020s^{†}
70	29.5	Kanye West	US	2000s–2020s
71	29	Rihanna	Barbados	2000s–2020s
72	28.5	Lynyrd Skynyrd	US	1960s–2020s
73	28	Adele	UK	2000s–2020s
73	28	Bee Gees	UK/Australia	1960s–2010s^{d}
73	28	Mannheim Steamroller	US	1970s–2010s
73	28	Michael Bolton	US	1980s–2020s
73	28	NSYNC	US	1990s–2020s
73	28	Nirvana	US	1980s–1990s^{d}
79	27.5	Barry Manilow	US	1970s–2020s
79	27.5	Brooks & Dunn	US	1990s–2010s
79	27.5	John Mellencamp	US	1970s–2020s
79	27.5	Red Hot Chili Peppers	US	1980s–2020s
83	27	Boyz II Men	US	1990s–2020s
83	27	Frank Sinatra	US	1930s–1990s^{†}
83	27	Luther Vandross	US	1960s–2000s^{†}
86	26.5	Enya	Ireland	1980s–2010s
86	26.5	Steve Miller Band	US	1960s–2010s
88	26	Janet Jackson	US	1980s–2010s
88	26	Outkast	US	1990s–2010s
88	26	Rush	Canada	1970s–2010s^{d}
91	25.5	Faith Hill	US	1990s–2010s
92	25	Creed	US	1990s–2010s
92	25	Lil Wayne	US	1990s–2020s
92	25	Mötley Crüe	US	1980s–2010s
92	25	Toby Keith	US	1990s–2020s^{†}
92	25	ZZ Top	US	1970s–2020s
97	24.5	REO Speedwagon	US	1970s–2010s
97	24.5	The Carpenters	US	1960s–1980s^{d}
98	24	Justin Bieber	Canada	2000s–2020s
98	24	Nickelback	Canada	1990s–2020s
98	24	Vince Gill	US	1970s–2010s

Notes:

^† Deceased
^d Disbanded

== Top 50 certified digital singles artists ==
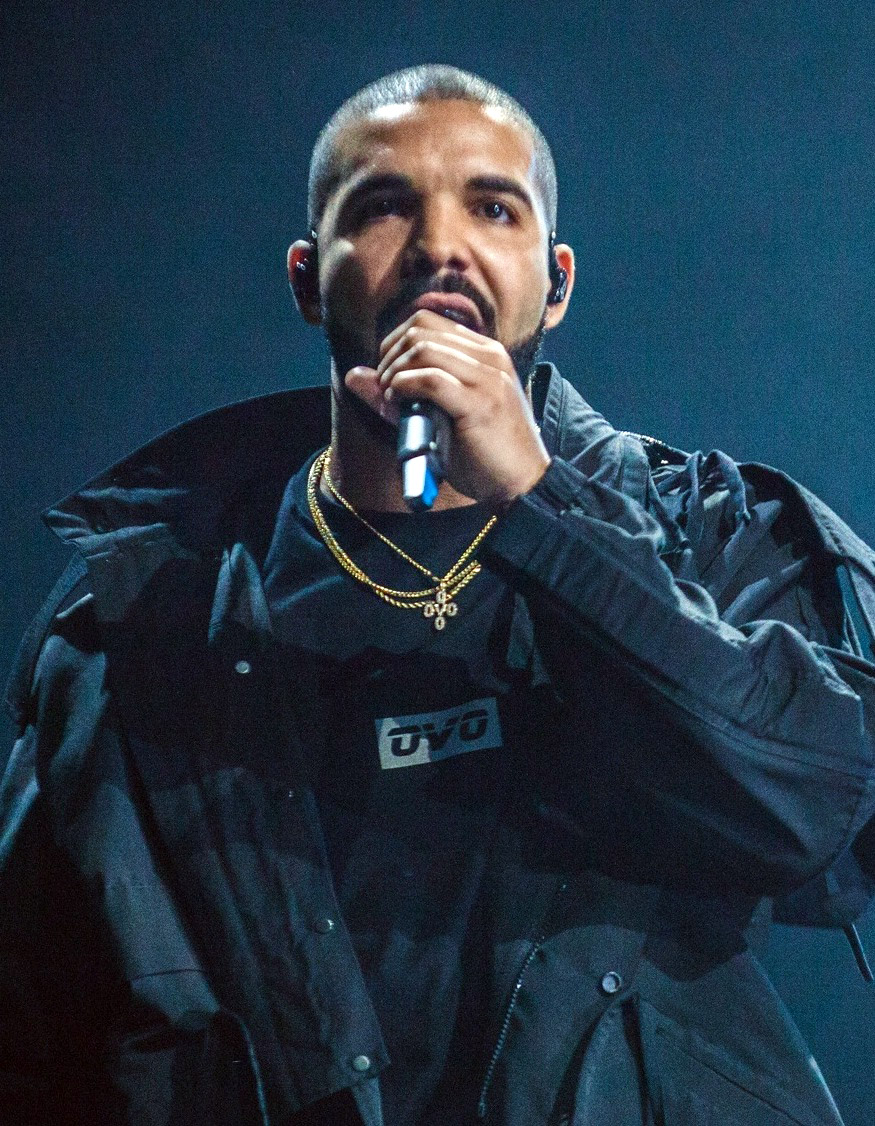
Drake

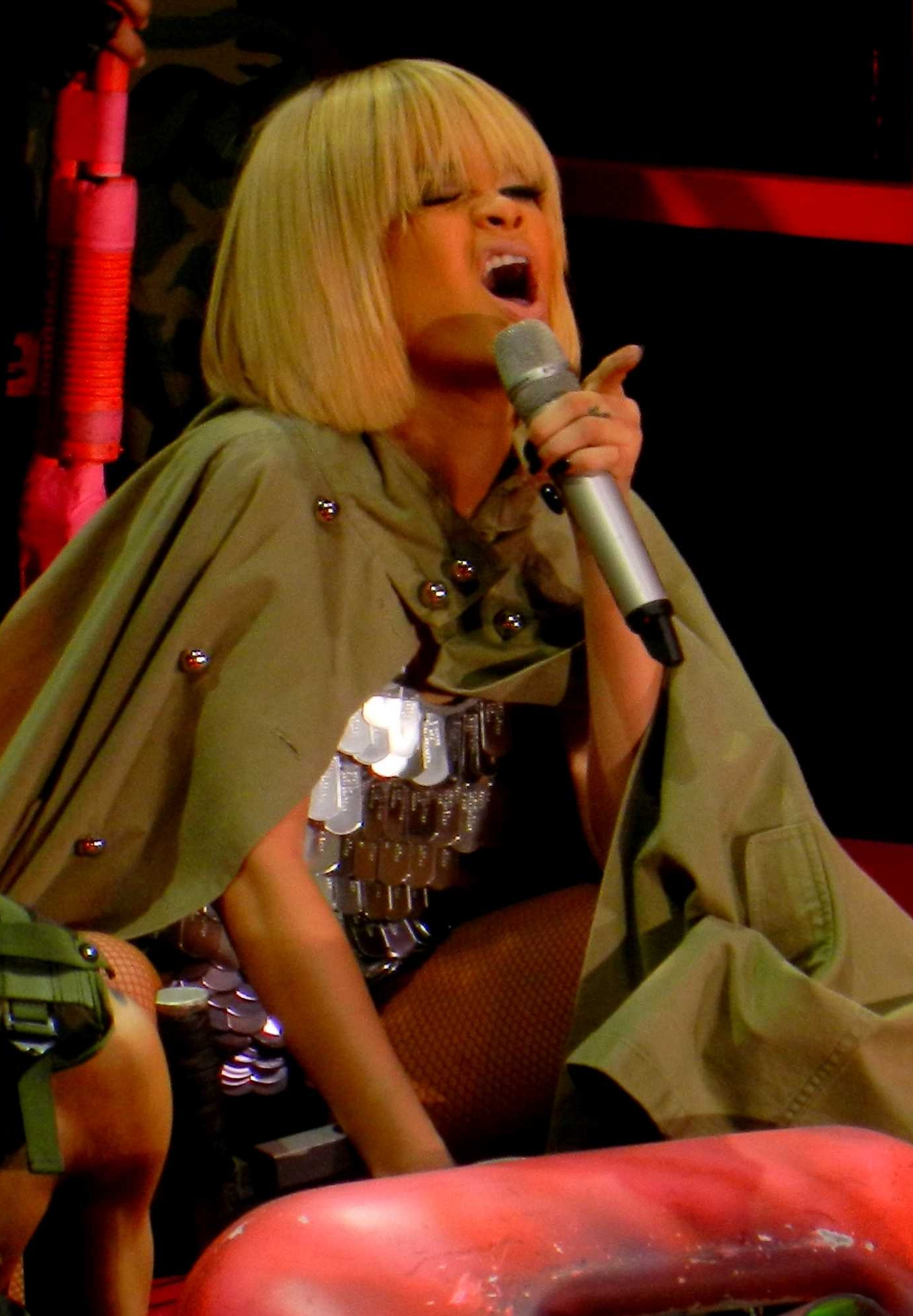
Rihanna

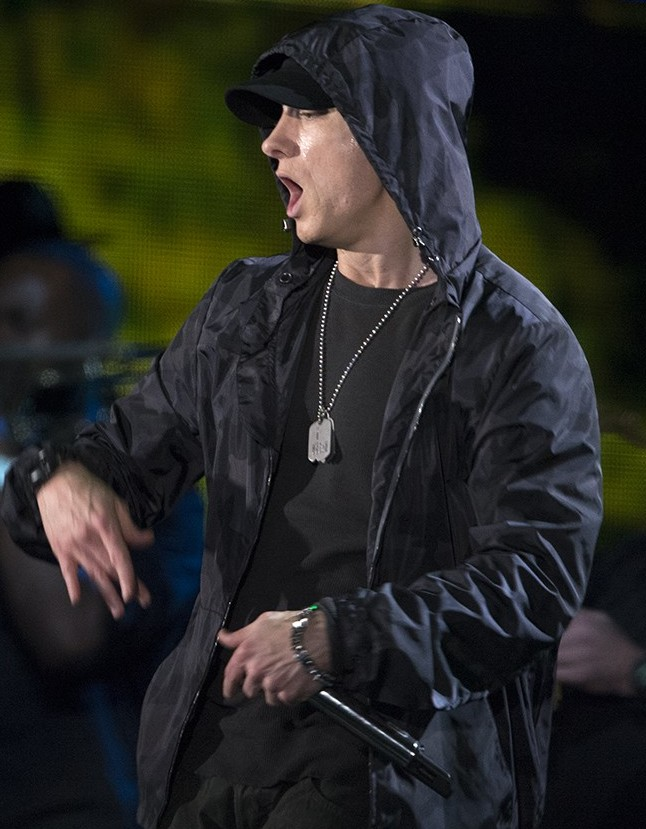
Eminem

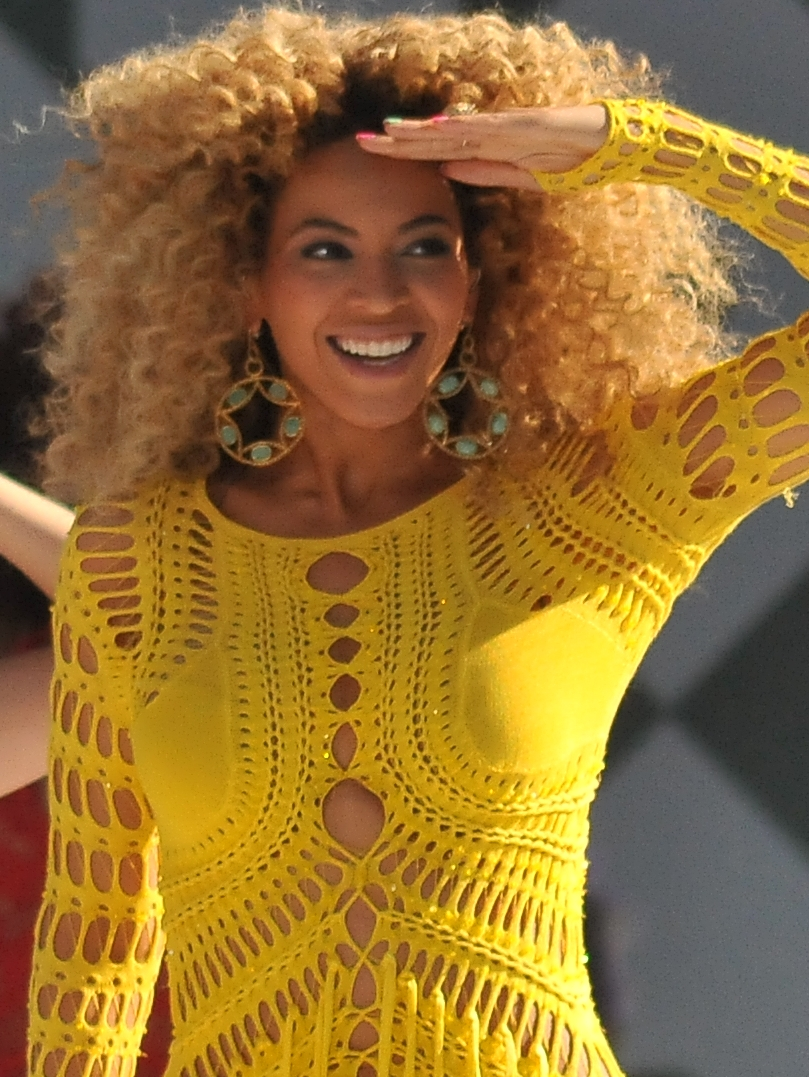
Beyoncé

The following is a list of 50 highest-certified digital singles artists in the United States, based on song downloads and streams. As album sales suffered in the 21st century, the RIAA introduced Digital Single Award in 2004 to better recognize "artists' commercial success in a transformative music marketplace". Streams were added as part of singles certification in 2013, with 150 audio/video streams being equal to one download. The RIAA does not count certified units of featured artists in their official ranking.

List of 50 artists with the highest-certified digital singles as of October 18, 2025
Rank	Units (millions)	Name	Nat.	Active
1	350	Drake	Canada	2000s–2020s
2	234	Kanye West	US	2000s–2020s
3	216	Morgan Wallen	US	2010s-2020s
4	200.5	Rihanna	Barbados	2000s–2020s
5	167	Eminem	US	1990s–2020s
6	161.5	Beyoncé	US	2000s–2020s
6	161.5	Future	US	2000s–2020s
8	147.5	Luke Combs	US	2010s–2020s
9	145	Post Malone	US	2010s–2020s
10	141.5	Chris Brown	US	2000s—2020s
11	141	Ariana Grande	US	2010s–2020s
11	141	Travis Scott	US	2000s–2020s
13	137.5	Taylor Swift	US	2000s–2020s
14	132	The Weeknd	Canada	2010s–2020s
15	128.5	Justin Bieber	Canada	2000s–2020s
16	121.5	Katy Perry	US	2000s–2020s
16	121.5	SZA	US	2010s-2020s
18	120.5	Bruno Mars	US	2000s–2020s
19	111.5	Imagine Dragons	US	2000s–2020s
20	109	YoungBoy Never Broke Again	US	2010s–2020s
21	105.5	Rod Wave	US	2010s–2020s
22	103.5	Ed Sheeran	UK	2000s–2020s
23	102	Luke Bryan	US	2000s–2020s
24	96.5	J. Cole	US	2000s–2020s
25	95	Lil Wayne	US	1990s–2020s
26	91	Lil Baby	US	2010s–2020s
27	87.5	Maroon 5	US	2000s–2020s
28	85	Lil Uzi Vert	US	2010s–2020s
29	84.5	Chris Stapleton	US	2000s–2020s
30	84	Juice Wrld	US	2010s^{†}

Notes:

^† Deceased
^d Disbanded

== See also ==
- List of best-selling music artists
- List of best-selling albums in the United States
- List of best-selling singles in the United States
