= Start Hill =

Hamlet in England

Coordinates: 51.871°N 0.206°E

- Location within Essex
- Civil parish: Great Hallingbury
- District: Uttlesford
- Shire county: Essex
- Region: East
- Country: England
- Sovereign state: United Kingdom
- Police: Essex
- Fire: Essex
- Ambulance: East of England

Start Hill is a hamlet on the B1256 road, in the civil parish of Great Hallingbury, in the Uttlesford district, in the county of Essex, England. It is near the town of Bishop's Stortford.

== Location ==
Start Hill is located on the B1256 road to the east of the town of Bishop's Stortford and junction 8 of the M11 motorway. The A120 road passes to the north of Start Hill. It is about 3 miles away from London Stansted Airport and is the location of one of the National Express coach depots.

== Notable people ==
- Singer Charli XCX grew up in Start Hill.
