= List of best-selling singles of 2014 in the United States =

This chart includes the 10 best-selling songs of 2014. According to Official Charts, "Happy" by Pharrell Williams was the best selling song of 2014 with 6.45 million copies sold in the United States. "Happy" was also the Billboard number one song of 2014. This is the fifth time in the past seven years that singer Katy Perry has had a song in the year-end top 10 best selling songs. She's the only artist who is able to make that claim. "Happy" and Idina Menzel's "Let It Go" are both songs from animated movies. "Happy" is from Despicable Me 2, and "Let It Go" is from Frozen.

Songs written in bold are songs that were released before January 1, 2014.

This chart is only for the United States.

== List of best-selling songs ==
Artist	Single	Released	Sales (in millions)	Source
Pharrell Williams	**"Happy"**	11/21/2013	6.45	
John Legend	**"All of Me"**	8/21/2013	4.67	
Katy Perry	**"Dark Horse"**	12/17/2013	4.43	
Meghan Trainor	"All About That Bass"	06/30/2014	4.36	
Iggy Azalea ft. Charli XCX	"Fancy"	02/17/2014	3.97	
Jason Derulo ft. 2 Chainz	"Talk Dirty"	01/07/2014	3.96	
DJ Snake ft. Lil Jon	**"Turn Down for What"**	12/18/2013	3.45	
Taylor Swift	"Shake It Off"	08/18/2014	3.43	
Idina Menzel	**"Let It Go"**	11/25/2013	3.37	
Sam Smith	"Stay with Me"	04/14/2014	3.34	

== Albums ==
According to Billboard, the best-selling album was 1989, by Taylor Swift. It sold 3.66 million copies in the US. It topped the Frozen Soundtrack album on the last week of December. Frozen's album sold 3.53 million copies. This is the second time Swift has earned the top selling album of a calendar year. She did it previously back in 2009 with her second studio album, Fearless, which made 3.22 million that year.

Albums written in bold were released before January 1, 2014.

This chart is only for the United States.

=== List of best-selling albums ===
Artist	Single	Released	Sales (in millions)	Source
Taylor Swift	1989	10/27/2014	3.66	
Various Artists	**Frozen (soundtrack)**	11/25/2013	3.53	
Sam Smith	In the Lonely Hour	05/26/2014	1.21	
Pentatonix	That's Christmas to Me	10/21/2014	1.14	
Beyoncé	**Beyoncé (album)**	12/13/2013	0.87	
Barbra Streisand	Partners	09/16/2014	0.85	
Lorde	**Pure Heroine**	09/27/2013	0.84	
One Direction	Four	11/17/2014	0.814	
