= POP2 =

POP2 and similar names may refer to:

- POP-2, a programming language developed around 1970
- Post Office Protocol (POP) version 2, a 1985 email exchange protocol
- Prince of Persia 2: The Shadow and the Flame, a 1993 video game
- POP2, a gene related to the enzyme 4-aminobutyrate—pyruvate transaminase
- Pop 2 (mixtape), a 2017 mixtape by Charli XCX
- Pop2! The Second 20 Hits, a 2009 album in the Erasure discography
- Pop 2! The Exploding Musical Mind of Dana Countryman, a 2014 album by Dana Countryman
- Punk Goes Pop Volume Two, a 2009 album of punk pop music
