= Spicy (Herve Pagez and Diplo song) =

Single by Herve Pagez and Diplo featuring Charli XCX
- Released: 30 May 2019
- Genre: EDM; synth-pop
- Length: 2:38
- Label: Mad Decent
- Songwriters: Spice Girls; Richard Stannard; Matt Rowe; Charlotte Aitchison; Emmanuel Valere; Joel Jaccoulet
- Producers: Herve Pagez; Diplo

Herve Pagez singles chronology
"In Those Jeans" (2017)	"Spicy" (2019)

Diplo singles chronology
"Give Dem" (2019)	"Spicy" (2019)	"JustYourSoul" (2019)

Charli XCX singles chronology
"Blame It on Your Love" (2019)	"Spicy" (2019)	"Dream Glow" (2019)

Music video
- "Spicy" on YouTube

"Spicy" is a song by French musician Herve Pagez and American producer Diplo, featuring vocals by British singer Charli XCX. The song was released on 30 May 2019 by the Mad Decent record label and heavily interpolates the Spice Girls's song "Wannabe". Therefore, the Spice Girls are credited as songwriters for the track, alongside Charli XCX, Emmanuel Valere, Joel Jaccoulet and "Wannabe" co-writers Matt Rowe and Richard Stannard. "Spicy" was produced by Pagez and Diplo.

== Charts ==
Chart (2019)	Peak position
Belgium (Ultratip Bubbling Under Wallonia)	16
Belgium Dance (Ultratop Wallonia)	48
France (SNEP)	87
New Zealand Hot Singles (RMNZ)	22
Sweden Heatseeker (Sverigetopplistan)	17
US Hot Dance/Electronic Songs (Billboard)	18
US Pop Airplay (Billboard)	33

== Release history ==
Region	Date	Format	Version	Label	Ref.
Various	30 May 2019	Digital download; streaming	Original	Mad Decent	
Italy	14 June 2019	Contemporary hit radio	Original	Sony	
Various	11 October 2019	Digital download; streaming	Remixes EP	Mad Descent	
