= Brat Tour =

2024–2025 concert tour by Charli XCX

- Tour by Charli XCX
- Promotional poster for the 2024 UK arena tour dates
- Location: Asia; Europe; North America; Oceania
- Associated albums: Brat
- Start date: 27 November 2024
- End date: 15 August 2025
- No. of shows: 36
- Supporting acts: Shygirl; Finn Keane

Charli XCX tour chronology
- Sweat (2024); Brat Tour (2024–2025); Music, Fashion, Film Tour (2026)

The Brat Tour (also referred to as the Brat Arena Tour for the arena dates) was the fourth solo concert tour by British singer-songwriter Charli XCX, in support of her sixth studio album Brat (2024). It began in Manchester, England, on 27 November 2024, and concluded in Gwacheon, South Korea, on 15 August 2025. British singer and DJ Shygirl served as the opening act for the UK leg, while British producer and artist Finn Keane was the opening act for the US leg.

== Background ==
Charli XCX released her sixth studio album Brat on 7 June 2024. It became her highest-charting album on the Billboard 200, and her biggest commercial success to date. Met with critical acclaim upon release, the album was dubbed by various outlets as "one of the biggest pop culture moments of the year". The style of album cover and the specific shade of green became a viral sensation after a "Brat generator" tool surfaced online that allowed users to replicate the cover with their own custom text, which was used during the presidential campaign of Kamala Harris in the United States, during the 2024 United Kingdom general election, and to promote the success of the Ultra Low Emission Zone scheme in London.

Promotional poster for Brat Live shows and Partygirl sets

To promote the album, Charli XCX announced two sets of live performances and appearances. Brat Live, which would see performances of the upcoming record, and Partygirl, which would replicate her previous Brooklyn-based Boiler Room warehouse set. Brat shows took place in Barcelona (as part of Primavera Sound), New York City, Chicago, Los Angeles, Roskilde (as part of the Roskilde Festival), and Gdynia (as part of Open'er). Partygirl sets were booked in Brooklyn, Barcelona, London, Mexico City, São Paulo, Pilton (as part of Glastonbury), and Ibiza.

A solo four-show tour of the United Kingdom, originally dubbed as the Brat 2024 Arena Tour, was announced on 3 April 2024 to commence in November. An additional co-headlining arena tour of North America alongside Australian singer-songwriter Troye Sivan, titled Sweat, was announced on 17 April 2024. The Brat Tour was later expanded into 2025, visiting selected indoor arenas and music festivals throughout Oceania, Europe, and North America.

== Set list ==
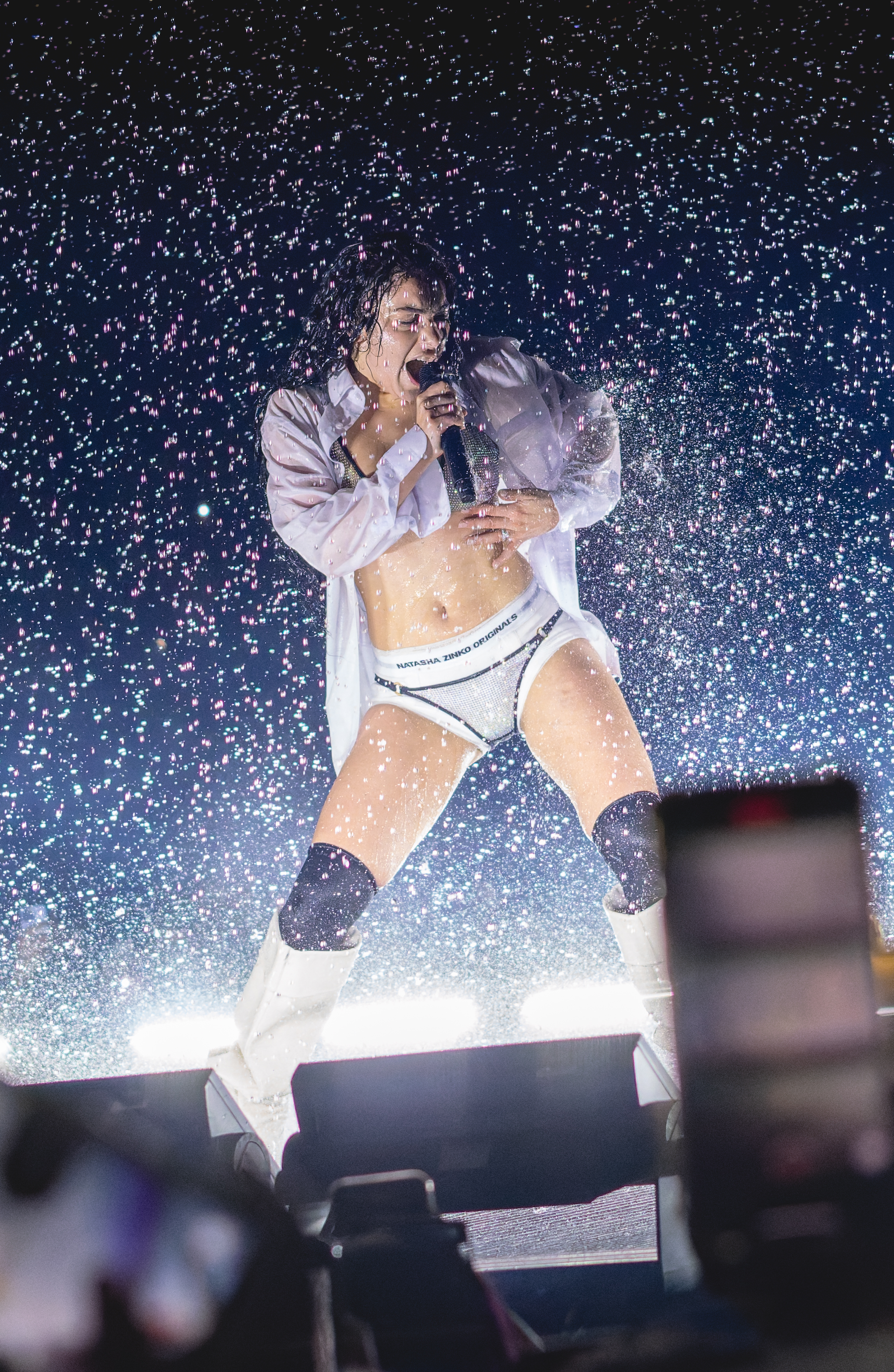
Charli XCX performing in Birmingham in 2024

The following set list is obtained from the 27 November 2024 show in Manchester. It is not intended to represent all dates throughout the tour.

Act I

1. "365 (Remix)" (Contains elements from "Club Classics", "Everything Is Romantic", and "Von Dutch (A. G. Cook remix)")
2. "360"
3. "Von Dutch"
4. "Rewind"

Act II

5. "I Might Say Something Stupid"
6. "Club Classics" (Contains elements from "Unlock It")
7. "Unlock It"
8. "Talk Talk"
9. "Apple"

Act III

10. "So I"
11. "So I (Remix)"
12. "Spring Breakers"
13. "Girl, So Confusing (Remix)"

Act IV

14. "Everything Is Romantic" (Contains elements from "Everything Is Romantic (Remix)" and "Track 10")
15. "Speed Drive"
16. "Sympathy Is a Knife"
17. "Guess (Remix)"
18. "365"

Encore

19. "Party 4 U"
20. "Vroom Vroom"
21. "Track 10"
22. "I Love It" (Contains elements from "365")

=== Alterations ===
- During the show in London, Charli was joined onstage by Caroline Polachek for "Everything Is Romantic" and "Welcome to My Island", and by Robyn and Yung Lean for "360" and "Dancing on My Own".
- During the first show in Indio, Troye Sivan, Lorde, and Billie Eilish joined Charli onstage to perform "Talk Talk", "Girl, So Confusing", and "Guess", respectively.
- During the second show in Indio, Addison Rae joined Charli onstage to perform "Von Dutch".
- During the second show in Brooklyn, Bb Trickz joined Charli onstage to perform "Club Classics".

== Tour dates ==
List of 2024 concerts
Date (2024)	City	Country	Venue
27 November	Manchester	England	Co-op Live
28 November	London	England	The O_{2} Arena
29 November	Birmingham	England	bp pulse LIVE
2 December	Glasgow	Scotland	OVO Hydro

List of 2025 concerts
Date (2025)	City	Country	Venue
February 6 (Note: These concerts were part of St Jerome's Laneway Festival.)	Auckland	New Zealand	Western Springs Stadium
February 8	Brisbane	Australia	Brisbane Showgrounds
February 9	Sydney	Australia	Centennial Park
February 14	Melbourne	Australia	Flemington Racecourse
February 15	Adelaide	Australia	Bonython Park
February 16	Perth	Australia	Wellington Square
April 5 (Note: This concert was part of AXE Ceremonia.)	Mexico City	Mexico	Parque Bicentenario
April 6 (Note: This concert was part of Tecate Pa'l Norte.)	Monterrey	Mexico	Parque Fundidora
April 12 (Note: These concerts were part of Coachella Valley Music & Arts Festival)	Indio	United States	Empire Polo Club
April 19	Indio	United States	Empire Polo Club
April 22	Austin	United States	Moody Center ATX
April 23	Austin	United States	Moody Center ATX
April 26	Minneapolis	United States	Target Center
April 28	Rosemont (Note: Labeled as Chicago in promotional material.)	United States	Allstate Arena
April 30	New York City (Note: Labeled as Brooklyn in promotional material.)	United States	Barclays Center
May 1	New York City	United States	Barclays Center
May 3	New York City	United States	Barclays Center
May 4	New York City	United States	Barclays Center
May 31 (Note: This concert was part of Orange Warsaw Festival.)	Warsaw	Poland	Służewiec Racecourse
June 7 (Note: This concert was part of We Love Green.)	Paris	France	Bois de Vincennes
June 12 (Note: This concert was part of Primavera Sound Porto.)	Porto	Portugal	Parque da Cidade
June 14 (Note: This concert was part of LIDO Festival.)	London	England	Victoria Park
June 15 (Note: This concert was part of Parklife.)	Manchester	England	Heaton Park
June 17	Malahide	Ireland	Malahide Castle
June 18 (Note: This concert was part of Belsonic.)	Belfast	Northern Ireland	Ormeau Park
June 28 (Note: This concert was part of Glastonbury Festival.)	Pilton	England	Worthy Farm
July 2 (Note: This concert was part of Roskilde Festival.)	Roskilde	Denmark	Dyrskueplads
August 6 (Note: This concert was part of Sziget Festival.)	Budapest	Hungary	Óbudai-Sziget
August 7 (Note: This concert was part of Øyafestivalen.)	Oslo	Norway	Tøyenparken
August 8 (Note: This concert was part of Way Out West.)	Gothenburg	Sweden	Slottsskogen
August 10 (Note: This concert was part of Flow Festival.)	Helsinki	Finland	Suvilahti
August 15 (Note: This concert was part of One Universe Festival.)	Gwacheon	South Korea	Seoul Grand Park
