= Talk Talk (Charli XCX song) =

2024 song by Charli XCX

Single by Charli XCX featuring Troye Sivan

from the album Brat and It's Completely Different but Also Still Brat
- Language: English; Spanish; French
- Released: 12 September 2024
- Genre: Balearic house
- Length: 2:53
- Label: Atlantic
- Songwriters: Charlotte Aitchison; Alexander Cook; Ross Birchard; Troye Mellet; Brett McLaughlin; Kaelyn Behr; Kevin Hickey
- Producers: A. G. Cook; Hudson Mohawke; Zhone; Novodor; Styalz Fuego

Charli XCX singles chronology
"Apple" (2024)	"Talk Talk" (2024)	"Party 4 U" (2025)

Troye Sivan singles chronology
"Honey" (2024)	"Talk Talk (remix)" (2024)	"She's the Best" (2026)

Lyric video
- "Talk Talk featuring Troye Sivan" on YouTube

"Talk Talk" (stylized in sentence case) is a song by British singer Charli XCX. It was first released on 7 June 2024 as the fifth track on her sixth studio album, Brat, and was written about her husband George Daniel. A revamped Balearic house inspired remix of the song, featuring Australian singer-songwriter Troye Sivan and an uncredited spoken word portion by English singer Dua Lipa, was released on 12 September 2024 as a single from Brat and It's Completely Different but Also Still Brat, marking the third collaboration between Charli XCX and Sivan.

== Original version and background ==
The original iteration of "Talk Talk", which appeared as an album track on Brat, was written by Charli XCX and producers A. G. Cook and Hudson Mohawke, and was released alongside the rest of the album by Atlantic Records on 7 June 2024. The original version has been described as a synth-pop track. Discussing the song in a video posted to her TikTok, Charli XCX stated that the song was inspired by an incident at the 2020 NME Awards, during which she was attracted to her future husband George Daniel but had not yet begun dating him. After tiring of texting Daniel, she went to follow him into the toilet, got halfway, but thought better of it. After releasing Brat, Charli XCX released remixes of the Brat tracks "360" (with Robyn and Yung Lean), "Von Dutch" (with Addison Rae and Cook, as well as with Skream and Benga), "Girl, So Confusing" (with Lorde), and "Guess" (with Billie Eilish).

== Remix ==
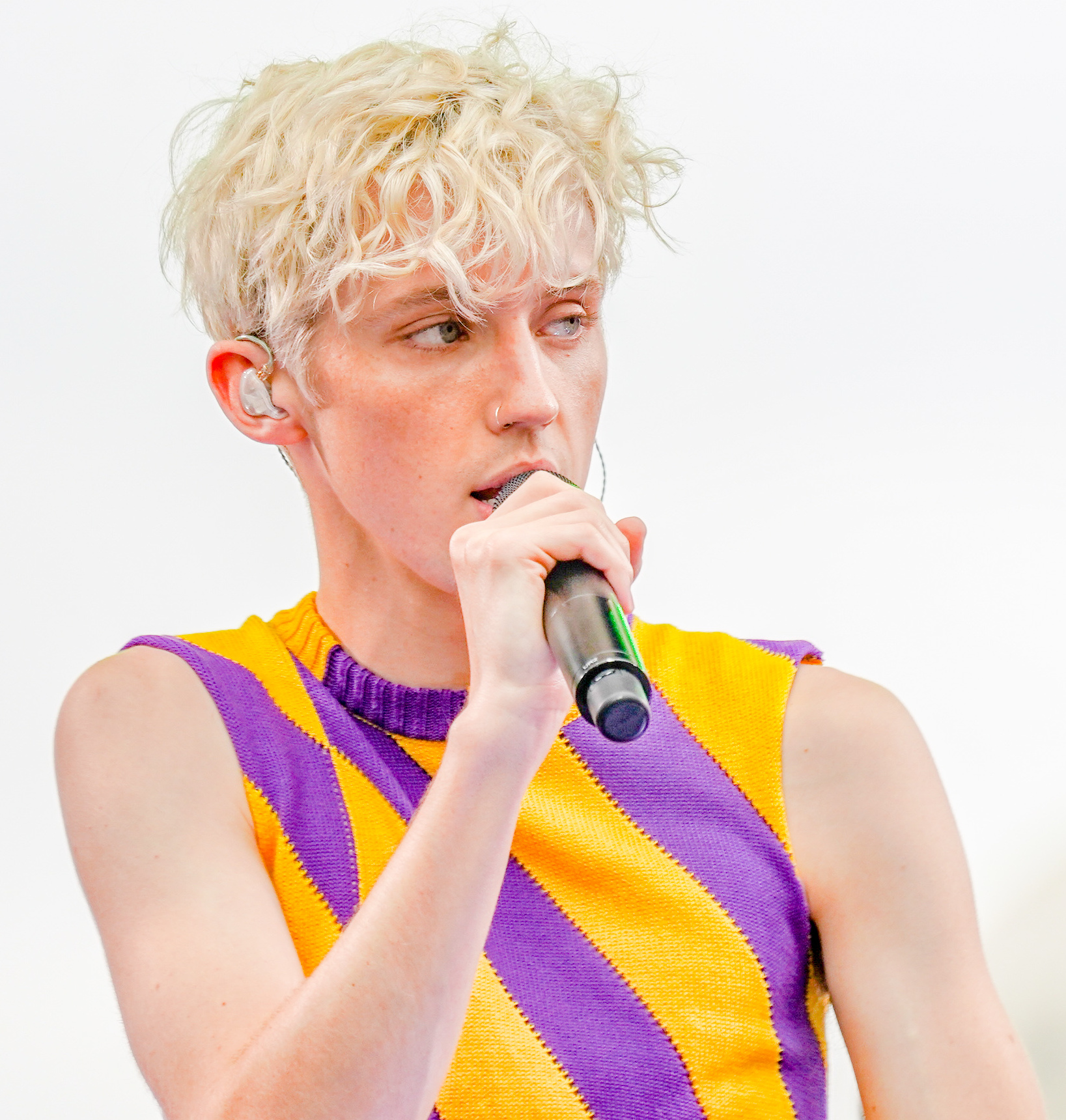
The remix of "Talk Talk" features frequent collaborator Troye Sivan.

A "Talk Talk" remix with Sivan was teased by both artists on social media prior to the official announcement, with Charli XCX posting a video to Twitter featuring her and Sivan dancing and lip-syncing to the new version of the song. Dua Lipa's involvement was also teased when Charli XCX shared a voice note from Lipa on her private Instagram account, and the song's producers tagged Lipa and Sivan on their stories. Brat and It's Completely Different but Also Still Brat, the remix album of Brat, was announced on 12 September 2024 alongside the release of "Talk Talk" with Sivan, which was sent to Italian radio the same day. The song is the third collaboration between the two artists following "1999" and "2099", both from Charli XCX's self-titled third studio album, Charli (2019), and its release coincided with the beginning of their co-headlining Sweat tour which began a few days later on 14 September, where it was performed as the concert's encore. Sivan also joined Charli XCX to perform the song during her Coachella 2025 set. Lipa speaks French and Spanish on the track. Dazed described the remix as a "Balearic house inspired club banger."

In an interview with Billboard, Sivan explained that Charli XCX chose "Talk Talk" as the song for him to feature on, and stated that she had originally sent him the song while she was working on it for Brat. He explained that she encouraged him and his "Rush" collaborators Leland, Kaelyn Behr, Kevin "Zhone" Hickey, and Kevin Novodor, to use the original track as a "seed" to expand, and experiment with to create his own interpretation of the track, which led to the creation of an almost entirely new song which Sivan felt was akin to "sampling" the original version. Sivan expressed that Charli XCX asked him to create a "two minute pop song rather than a six minute club song", and that he enjoyed "taking the scissors" to the original track and working collaboratively with Charli XCX and her team to produce the remix.

== Reception ==
In a positive review of the song, Emily G. Fallas-Chacon of The Harvard Crimson called the remix "a pop classic". She commented that "while [Charli XCX and Troye] being unapologetically themselves with satisfying vocals, both artists open the space up for both new and old fans to indulge in the pleasures the remix has to offer", giving the song 4 stars. Tom Breihan of Stereogum stated that the remix is a "complete reworking of the original track that barely sounds anything like the original". Referring to the song as a "slamming house banger", he remarked on how the remix lacks the "incandescent hook" of the original version, expressing that "it's got none of the nervous vulnerability of the original 'Talk Talk'. Instead this one is just about being really excited to fuck".

== Charts ==
=== Weekly charts ===
Weekly chart performance for "Talk Talk"
Chart (2024)	Peak position
Australia (ARIA)	42
Australia Dance (ARIA)	2
Ireland (IRMA)	62
New Zealand Hot Singles (RMNZ)	6

Weekly chart performance for "Talk Talk featuring Troye Sivan"
Chart (2024)	Peak position
Canada Hot 100 (Billboard)	66
Global 200 (Billboard)	91
Ireland (IRMA)	30
Latvia Airplay (TopHit)	3
Lithuania Airplay (TopHit)	65
New Zealand Hot Singles (RMNZ)	5
South Korea BGM (Circle)	197
UK Singles (Official Charts)	24
UK Dance (Official Charts)	4
US Billboard Hot 100	74
US Hot Dance/Electronic Songs (Billboard)	5

=== Monthly charts ===
Monthly chart performance for "Talk Talk featuring Troye Sivan"
Chart (2024)	Peak Position
Latvia Airplay (TopHit)	11
Lithuania Airplay (TopHit)	76

=== Year-end charts ===
2024 year-end chart performance for "Talk Talk featuring Troye Sivan"
Chart (2024)	Position
US Hot Dance/Electronic Songs (Billboard)	22

== Certifications ==
Region	Certification	Certified units/sales
Canada (Music Canada)	Platinum	80,000^{‡}
New Zealand (RMNZ)	Gold	15,000^{‡}
United Kingdom (BPI)	Silver	200,000^{‡}
^{‡} Sales+streaming figures based on certification alone.
