= Quenlin Blackwell =

American media personality and model (born 2001)

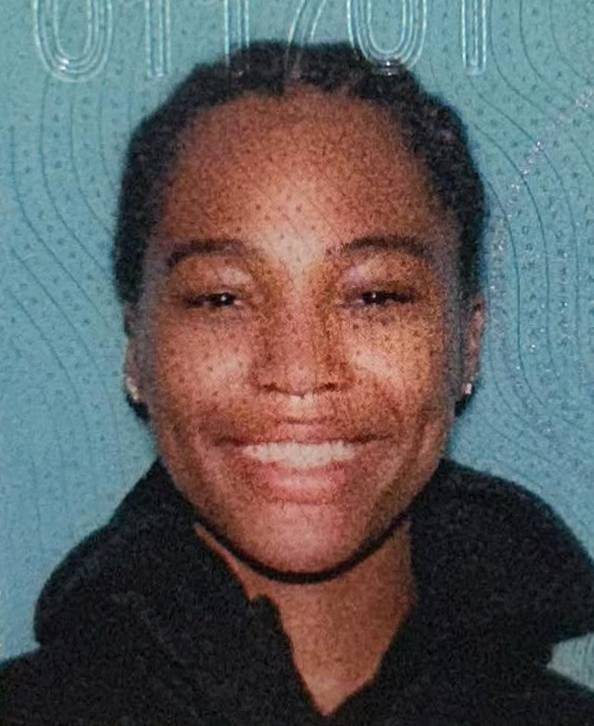
- Driver's license photo of Blackwell, c. 2023
- Born: Quenlin Riquera Blackwell; January 17, 2001 (age 25); Dallas, Texas U.S.
- Other name: Quen Blackwell
- Education: Allen High School
- Occupations: YouTuber; Model; Actress
- Years active: 2013–present

TikTok information
- Page: quenblackwell
- Years active: 2019–present
- Genre: Talk
- Followers: 13.5 million

YouTube information
- Channel: Quenlin Blackwell
- Years active: 2014–present
- Genres: Comedy; Talk
- Subscribers: 3.56 million
- Views: 390.8 million
- Last updated: 23 July 2026

Quenlin Riquera Blackwell (born January 17, 2001) is an American model and comedian. She first found success on Vine as a teenager in the mid-2010s with comedic videos before shifting to other social media platforms such as YouTube, Twitter, and TikTok. As of 2025, she hosts the YouTube interview series Feeding Starving Celebrities.

== Early life ==
Quenlin Riquera Blackwell was born on January 17, 2001 in Dallas, Texas. She was raised in a predominantly white suburb of Dallas after she moved from Cincinnati, where the rest of her family is from, when she was about three years old. She has described the move as "traumatic" and her upbringing in Texas as alienating, stating that she had to "constantly convince" her friends at the time "why [she] deserved their consideration". As a child, her father was in prison. She started a YouTube channel when she was eight years old and began posting videos online at age nine. She participated in cheerleading and attended Allen High School in Allen, Texas.

== Career ==
=== 2015–2023: Beginnings ===
In 2015, when she was 14 years old, Blackwell started posting comedic videos on the video sharing platform Vine, where she gained over 500 thousand followers in the mid-2010s. Blackwell gained an online following after she posted a video of herself falling while performing a cheerleading stunt, which received more than five million views in one day. Many of her other Vine videos involved similar physical comedy, including her falling off of a hoverboard and strumming a guitar with her hair; she retrospectively described it as "freak content". When Blackwell was 17 years old, she moved to Los Angeles, California.

Following the shutdown of Vine, she became popular on Twitter and YouTube. A screenshot from a 2018 Twitter video of Blackwell screaming, paired side-by-side with a photo of reality television personality Ms. Juicy staring blankly ahead, became a popular meme on Twitter in May 2019 to depict users trying to explain things to their mothers. She began posting vlog–style videos on TikTok in 2019. A video on the platform of her crying over accidentally purchasing a couch for $100,000 and asking for donations went viral in October 2022 before she soon revealed that it was a prank, which received backlash online.

By 2023, she had more than eight million followers on TikTok and more than one million subscribers on YouTube. Blackwell starred in the music video for SG Lewis and Lucky Daye's song "Feed the Fire" in November 2020. In February 2021, Blackwell signed with United Talent Agency. Also in 2021, she was nominated as Breakout Creator at the 11th Streamy Awards and participated in the YouTube Originals reality competition series No. 1 Chicken, hosted by YouTuber FaZe Rug. She was one of the hosts of YouTube's Coachella livestream in April 2022 and modeled for the lingerie brand Savage X Fenty's December 2022 campaign. She launched the clothing brand Riquera in December 2023.

=== 2024–present: Rise to prominence ===
In March 2024, she made her runway debut walking for Off-White during Paris Fashion Week. She appeared alongside other Internet personalities in the music video for "360" by British singer Charli XCX in May 2024. Blackwell was featured as an onstage guest during Charli XCX's performance of her songs "Von Dutch" and "Guess" at the 67th Annual Grammy Awards. She signed with Creative Artists Agency in October 2024, by which point she had amassed more than ten million followers on TikTok and more than two million on Instagram.

As of 2025, she hosts the YouTube series Feeding Starving Celebrities, which features her cooking for colleagues and friends such as Larray, Lil Nas X, Lil Yachty, PinkPantheress, Addison Rae, and the Sturniolo Triplets. Throughout 2025, she modeled in various high profile campaigns for Stella McCartney, Glossier, Old Navy, Chanel, Charlotte Tilbury, and the sunglasses brand Elisa Johnson. In October 2025, she walked the runway at the Victoria's Secret Fashion Show, which was received positively on social media. In November 2025, she hosted GQ Men of the Year. Blackwell hosted the 2026 Vanity Fair Oscars Party 2026 dressed by Chanel. In October 2026, Blackwell once again walked the Victoria's Secret Fashion Show and notably closed the PINK section.

In 2026, she became a MAC ambassador with her first MAC campaign for MAC x Sephora and later went on to create her own MAC lip combo. She became the face of several other campaigns including Hennessy, Youth To The People, Pinterest, Balenciaga, and Old Navy. In August 2026, Blackwell joined the Nike family and is expected to front several Nike campaigns in the next year. She is confirmed to have a bespoke contract with Chanel. In November 2026, she was starred in Tommy Hilfiger’s 2026 global holiday campaign.

She was a guest star in Rachel Sennott's HBO series I Love LA, which premiered in November 2025.

== In the media ==
In 2025, Blackwell was included on Time, The Hollywood Reporter, and Rolling Stone's respective lists of the most influential content creators online. For InStyle, Moises Mendez II wrote that Blackwell had "cement[ed] herself among the internet's it girls" by 2025. She was named in Variety’s 2025 Young Hollywood Impact Report and Complex’s Top 50 Innovators.

In 2026, Blackwell was named as the “Next Big Thing” by The Hollywood Reporter. Blackwell was also named in Time100 Creators list, Vanity Fair’s feature titled “The New Late Night”, Harper’s Bazaar “How Do You Make Art in 2026” in their April Issue and in Variety’s 10 Creators to Watch list and Rolling Stone’s 25 Most Influential Creators list.

She has also been on the cover of several fashion magazines including Highsnobiety, Dazed, Paper, Complex, The Perfect, Homme Girls, Greatest, Interlope and The Cut . She has also been featured in Interview,Cosmopolitan, Vogue Italia, Los Angeles, The Face Magazine, Wonderland and Flaunt Magazine to name a few.

== Personal life ==
Blackwell came out as bisexual in 2018. She was diagnosed with OCD at age 15. She has also stated that she suffered from anorexia, which, according to her, worsened in 2018 after she received hate online for an unintelligible tweet about her parents' skincare brand.

In October 2020, a then-19-year-old Blackwell and the then-41-year-old American record producer Diplo posted videos about living with one another, which fans online decried as Diplo grooming Blackwell, though both denied that they had a relationship beyond being friends. Diplo clarified that Blackwell was renting a property from him and that there was no romantic relationship between the pair.

== Filmography ==
=== Television ===
Year	Title	Role	Notes	Ref.
2021	The D'Amelio Show	Self	Guest appearance	
2021	No. 1 Chicken	Self	Contestant	
2025	I Love LA	Self	Guest role; Episode: "Upstairses"	

=== Music videos ===
Year	Title	Artist	Ref.
2020	"Feed the Fire"	SG Lewis and Lucky Daye	
2024	"360"	Charli XCX	
2024	"90s Baby"	JT	
2025	"Ran Out"	JT	
2026	"Homewrecker"	sombr	
