= Matt Benns =

New Zealand hairstylist

Matt Benns is a New Zealand hairstylist. He has worked with Lorde, Beyoncé, Kim Kardashian, Billie Eilish, and Charli XCX, styling her hair for her Brat and Sweat tours.
