= Apple (song) =

2024 single by Charli XCX

Single by Charli XCX

from the album Brat
- Released: 2 August 2024
- Genre: Electropop; synth-pop
- Length: 2:31
- Label: Atlantic; Warner
- Songwriters: Charlotte Aitchison; George Daniel; Linus Wiklund; Jonnali Parmenius
- Producers: Charlotte Aitchison; George Daniel; Linus Wiklund; A. G. Cook

Charli XCX singles chronology
"Guess" (2024)	"Apple" (2024)	"Talk Talk" (2024)

Lyric video
- "Apple" on YouTube

"Apple" is a song by British singer Charli XCX from her sixth studio album, Brat (2024). It was written by Charli XCX, George Daniel, Linus Wiklund and Noonie Bao, and produced by Charli XCX, A. G. Cook, Daniel, and Wiklund. The song was released to Italian radio through Warner Records on 2 August 2024, as the fifth single from the album and subsequently in the United States on 10 September. The electropop and synth-pop song touches upon themes of intergenerational trauma and her connection with her family, featuring some idiomatic expressions with the fruit apple.

Critics commended the song for being an energetic and catchy song. Commercially, the song managed to peak inside the top-ten in the United Kingdom and Ireland, while also charting inside the top-twenty in Australia and top-forty in five other countries. In the United States, it peaked at number 51 and 12 on the Pop Airplay chart. It went viral on TikTok shortly afterwards, spawning a dance craze on the platform. "Apple" earned a Grammy Award nomination for Best Pop Solo Performance at the 67th Annual Grammy Awards. The song was also included in both the setlists of the Sweat and Brat Tour (2024).

== Background and composition ==
"Apple"
A 15-second sample of "Apple" by Charli XCX, where the snippet of the track that is accompanied by the viral dance trend is heard, the song blends retro 80's electro, pop and synth-pop with pulsating beats.

"Apple" was teased on 8 September 2023, after Charli XCX uploaded a photo of her notebook, displaying the lyrics to a track called "The Apple". The track was again previewed on 2 April 2024 in a voice memo sent to her fans, which confirmed "Apple" to be part of her 2024 album, Brat. The song initially impacted Italian radio on 2 August 2024, as the album's third single and later it was serviced to U.S. radio on 10 September.

An electropop track, "Apple" utilises retro 1980s electropop and synth-pop while keeping a prominent pop sound. Meaghan Garvey, writing for Pitchfork, saw "the sweetness" of the French musician and DJ Breakbot as inspiration of the track.

Lyrically, in the song, Charli XCX takes a bite from a metaphorical apple, determines it to be rotten, and has an overwhelming urge to flee the scene. The track addresses Charli XCX's relationship with her parents and intergenerational trauma, where "Apple" is used as a metaphor symbolizing both family connection and the nature of trauma. In its lyrics, XCX also makes the usage of idiomatic expressions, such as the apple does not fall far from the tree and rotten to the core. As noted by Jackson Greer from Plugged In, Charli XCX returns to the topic of mental health by appropriating an apple core as a symbol of generational trauma passed down through her family. She sings, "I think the apple’s rotten right to the core/From all the things passed down/From all the apples coming before."

== Critical reception ==
"Apple" received mostly positive reviews from music critics. Meaghan Garvey of Pitchfork found the track's fruit allegory "curious", but wrote that she had never had a Charli XCX lyric "bounce around" her head in "the way that lines from 'Apple' have". Gio Santiago of Resident Advisor wrote that the track "would have no issues turning an empty dance floor into a sweaty sauna" and Ludovic Hunter-Tilney of the Financial Times opined that the track paid tribute to "the sound of the 1980s". Writing for No Ripcord, Joe Rivers wrote that it "might seem jaunty and almost throwaway at first, but its lyrics about her relationship with her parents and how she sometimes wants to run away while also recognising their shared traits are truly universal." Austin Saalman of Under the Radar praised it for being "infectious" and for "serv[ing] as somewhat more accessible entries, with Charli once again exploring the same shock of inspiration that surely gave way to 2014’s immortal 'Boom Clap'." Alexis Yi from The Tech commended its "light touch and comical lyrical stylings, like the way Charli pronounces 'airport' to sound like 'apple'." Paolo Ragusa of Consequence of Sound noted that the song "evokes a bubblegum flair, but almost surprisingly, this conventional sound feels out of place compared to the more haywire, unpredictable tracks."

== Commercial performance ==
In the United Kingdom, "Apple" debuted at number sixty-four on the UK Singles Chart following its virality on TikTok on the issue of 12 July 2024. In its fourth week, the song jumped to number 14, until it peaked at number 8 the following week; it remained at its peak position for another week, inside the top-ten for three weeks and inside the top-twenty for ten weeks in total. "Apple" became the album's highest-charting single at the time it peaked - it was surpassed later by "Sympathy Is a Knife" (which peaked at number seven). In Ireland, "Apple" became the album's first top-ten single, reaching number 9 on the Irish Singles Chart. In Australia, the song debuted and peaked at number 18 on the ARIA Singles Chart, where it remained in its peak position for three weeks. It debuted alongside XCX and Billie Eilish's "Guess" (which reached the pole position) becoming the highest-peaking singles of the album. On the US Billboard Hot 100 chart, the song peaked at number 51, whilst on the Pop Airplay chart it peaked at number 12, becoming XCX's second song from Brat to peak inside the top-twenty.

== Recognition and cover versions ==
The song went viral on TikTok shortly after release after New York-based actress and content creator Kelley Heyer uploaded a dance to the platform. Performing the dance involves body rolls, placing hands on hips, holding an imaginary apple above the performer's head, and pretending to drive a car. By 28 June, Charli XCX had filmed herself performing the dance alongside Troye Sivan, while similar videos had been filmed by various celebrities. In addition, a version of the dance was produced by #AmishTikTok content creators, who substituted operating a horse and buggy for driving a car. Charli XCX later uploaded footage of her abortively trying to convince her then-fiancé George Daniel to perform the dance.

In August 2024, Griff performed a dream-pop version of the track for Like a Version, a series for Triple J. NME described her take as "sparkly and glittery" and wrote that the track had "a heavy emphasis on dreamy synths and wavy cymbals". In an interview for Triple J, Griff stated that she had been moved to cover the track as she had found the album inspirational. On 12 August 2024, Upsahl performed an acoustic cover of "Apple" for SiriusXM Hits 1.

The song entered both Exclaim! and NPR lists of Best Songs of 2024, with the former claiming that: "This song about inherent vice (parents just don't understand) is the jagged, melodic piece of candy at the bottom of BRAT's handbag. The appeal of "Apple" is elementary, bounding with full sound and Charli XCX's most in-ha-mood cadence. An accessible anomaly on the record, it was the natural choice to soundtrack both Charli's siege of the mainstream and a peyote-button-cute dance trend even your dad can do. Plus, her obligatory automotive dream." The song earned a Grammy Award nomination for Best Pop Solo Performance at the 67th Annual Grammy Awards, becoming her first in that category. The song has also been nominated for a Musikförläggarnas pris in the category of Song of the Year.

=== Year-end lists ===
Publication	Accolade	Rank	Ref.
Exclaim!	20 Best Songs of 2024	16	
NPR	124 Best Songs of 2024	—N/a	

== Remix ==
"Apple featuring the Japanese House"

Remix by Charli XCX featuring the Japanese House

from the album Brat and It's Completely Different but Also Still Brat
- Released: 11 October 2024
- Genre: Synth-pop; dream pop
- Length: 2:37
- Label: Atlantic
- Songwriters: Charlotte Aitchison; Amber Bain; Jonnali Parmenius
- Producers: Charli XCX; George Daniel; Linus Wiklund; A. G. Cook

Audio video
- "Apple featuring the Japanese House" on YouTube

In October 2024, at Charli XCX's instruction, her fans announced that the Japanese House would feature on a remix of the song for Brat and It's Completely Different but Also Still Brat. It was released on 11 October 2024 along with the remix album.

== Charts ==
=== Weekly charts ===
Weekly chart performance for "Apple"
Chart (2024–2025)	Peak position
Australia (ARIA)	18
Austria (Ö3 Austria Top 40)	74
Canada Hot 100 (Billboard)	37
Canada CHR/Top 40 (Billboard)	12
Czech Republic Singles Digital (ČNS IFPI)	85
Estonia Airplay (TopHit)	129
Global 200 (Billboard)	30
Greece International (IFPI)	50
Iceland (Tónlistinn)	37
Ireland (IRMA)	9
Latvia Airplay (LaIPA)	18
Lithuania (AGATA)	47
Lithuania Airplay (TopHit)	61
Netherlands (Single Top 100)	90
New Zealand (Recorded Music NZ)	22
Philippines (Philippines Hot 100)	86
Portugal (AFP)	115
Singapore (RIAS)	28
Sweden (Sverigetopplistan)	75
Switzerland (Schweizer Hitparade)	93
UK Singles (Official Charts)	8
US Billboard Hot 100	51
US Adult Pop Airplay (Billboard)	34
US Hot Dance/Electronic Songs (Billboard)	2
US Hot Dance/Pop Songs (Billboard)	2
US Pop Airplay (Billboard)	12

=== Year-end charts ===
2024 year-end chart performance for "Apple"
Chart (2024)	Position
US Hot Dance/Electronic Songs (Billboard)	12

2025 year-end chart performance for "Apple"
Chart (2025)	Position
Canada CHR/Top 40 (Billboard)	52
US Hot Dance/Pop Songs (Billboard)	12
US Pop Airplay (Billboard)	37

== Certifications ==
Certifications for "Apple"
Region	Certification	Certified units/sales
Australia (ARIA)	Gold	35,000^{‡}
Austria (IFPI Austria)	Gold	15,000^{‡}
Canada (Music Canada)	Platinum	80,000^{‡}
New Zealand (RMNZ)	Platinum	30,000^{‡}
Poland (ZPAV)	Platinum	50,000^{‡}
United Kingdom (BPI)	Platinum	600,000^{‡}
^{‡} Sales+streaming figures based on certification alone.

== Release history ==
Release history for "Apple"
Region	Date	Format	Label	Ref.
Italy	2 August 2024	Radio airplay	Warner	
United States	10 September 2024	Contemporary hit radio	Warner	
