= Tess McMillan =

American model

Tess McMillan is an American model.

McMillan is from Texas. She was found on Instagram by photographer Heather Hazzan.

Tessa is a painter. In October 2023, she had the first solo exhibition of her work, titled "Find Me Where You Left Me".

In 2024, she appeared in the music video for the Charli XCX song 360.
