= Brat and It's Completely Different but Also Still Brat =

2024 remix album by Charli XCX

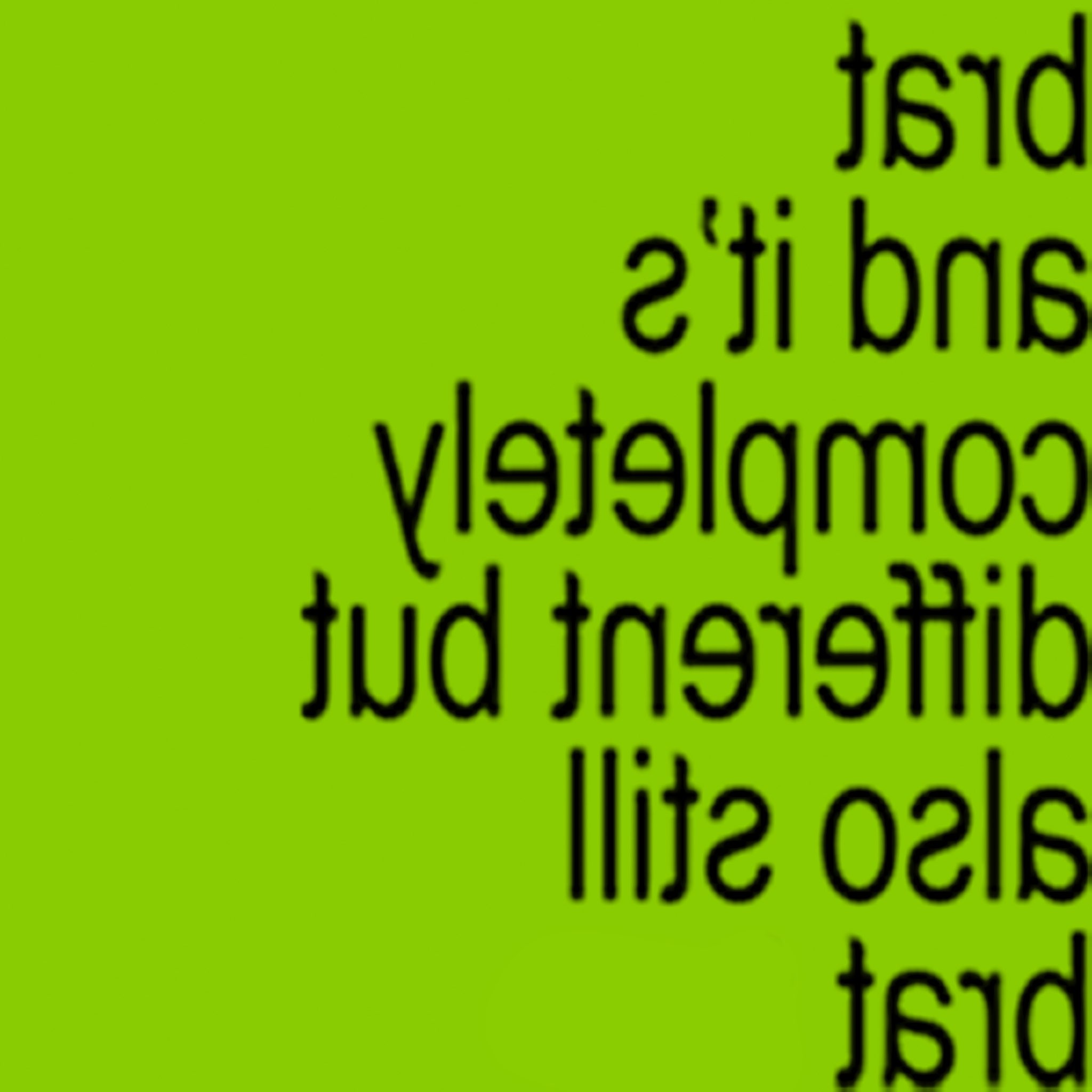

Remix album by Charli XCX
- Released: 11 October 2024
- Genre: Electropop
- Length: 50:28
- Languages: English; Spanish; French
- Label: Atlantic
- Producers: A. G. Cook; Bon Iver; the Dare; Finneas; Finn Keane; George Daniel; the Japanese House; Jason Lader; Jon Hopkins; Julian Casablancas; Novodor; Styalz Fuego; TimFromTheHouse; Toby Wincorn; Zhone

Charli XCX chronology
Brat (2024)	Brat and It's Completely Different but Also Still Brat (2024)	Wuthering Heights (2026)

Singles from Brat and It's Completely Different but Also Still Brat
- 1. "Guess" Released: 1 August 2024; 2. "Talk Talk" Released: 12 September 2024; 3. "Everything Is Romantic" Released: 3 October 2025

Brat and It's Completely Different but Also Still Brat (alternatively titled Brat and It's Completely Different) (Note: Only used on certain vinyl pressings and Billboard) (Note: The Brat and It's Completely Different release of the album only contains the version of disc 1 with the "Spring Breakers" remix; the standard tracks are omitted from this release.) is the first remix album by British singer Charli XCX, released on 11 October 2024 by Atlantic Records. The album contains remixes of seventeen out of eighteen tracks from the deluxe version of her sixth studio album, Brat and It's the Same but There's Three More Songs So It's Not (2024), but also features the original tracks, thereby serving as a double album.

The featured artists on the album are Robyn, Yung Lean, BB Trickz, Ariana Grande, the 1975, Jon Hopkins, Troye Sivan, Addison Rae, Caroline Polachek, Bladee, Lorde, the Japanese House, Tinashe, Julian Casablancas, Bon Iver, Shygirl, Billie Eilish, Kesha, and A. G. Cook. Cook and Finn Keane primarily handled production, with George Daniel, and featured guests Bon Iver, Casablancas, and the Japanese House, among others, contributing additional production work.

Upon release, the record received acclaim from music critics, who considered it an innovative companion piece to the original album for featuring largely unreleased lyrics, going beyond a simple remix album. The track "Guess", featuring Billie Eilish, received a nomination for the Grammy Award for Best Pop Duo/Group Performance.

== Background ==
Charli XCX released her sixth studio album Brat on 7 June 2024 to critical acclaim. A variety of remixes of its songs were released throughout its album cycle before the announcement of a remix album, starting with the release of the "Von Dutch" remix with A. G. Cook and Addison Rae, on 22 March 2024. Subsequent remixes of album tracks, such as "Girl, So Confusing" with Lorde and "Guess" with Billie Eilish, fueled rumours of a "remix concept".

== Release and promotion ==
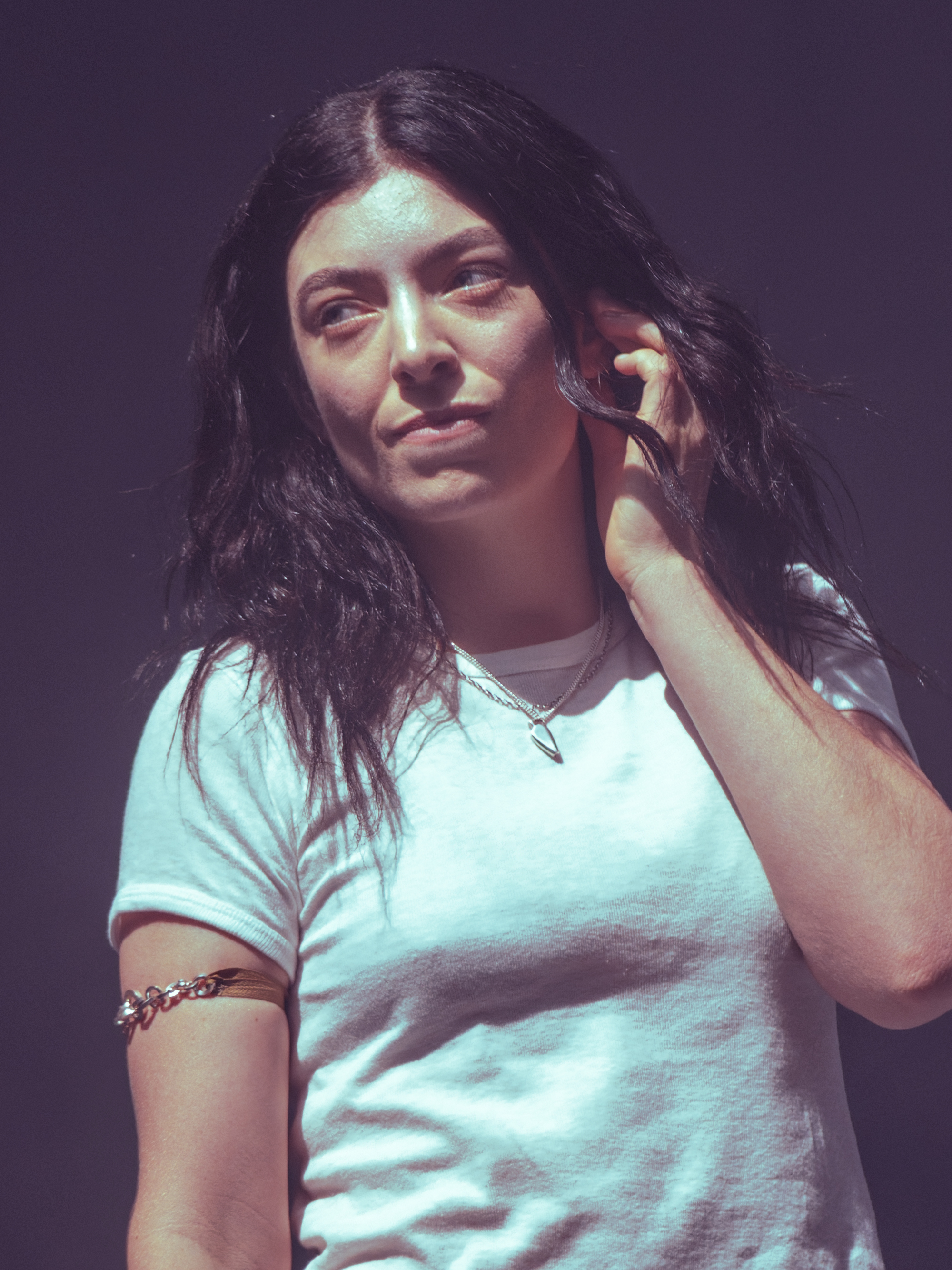
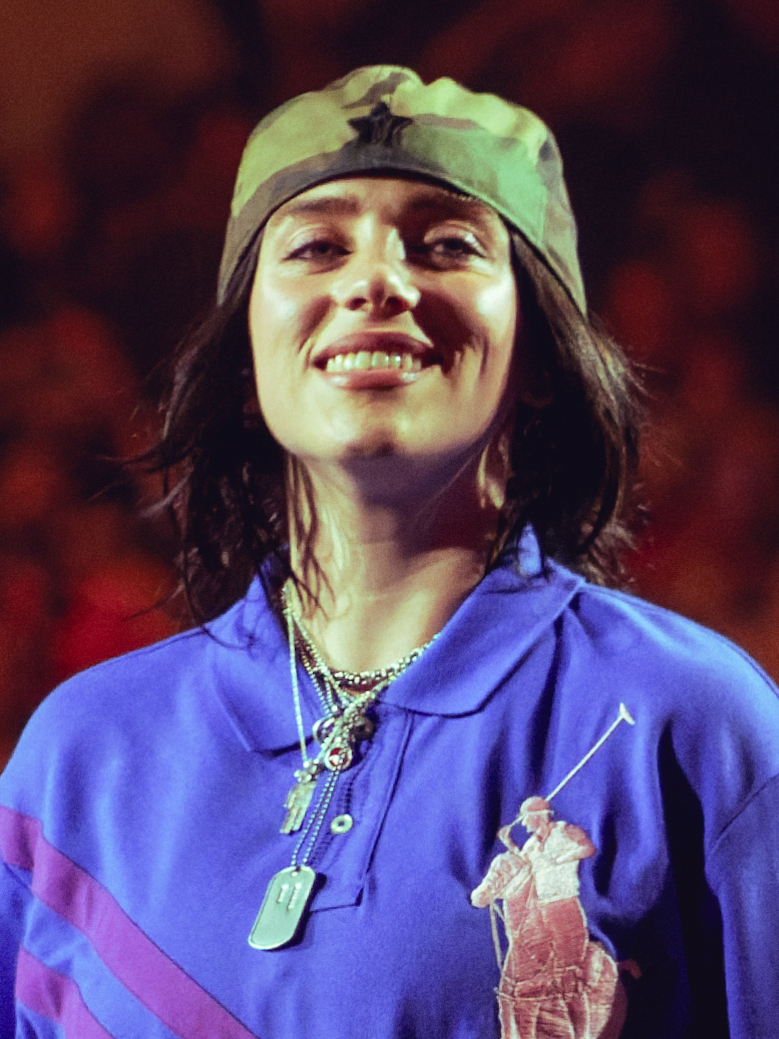
Lorde (left) and Billie Eilish (right) are among the artists featured on the album.

Brat and It's Completely Different but Also Still Brat was announced along with the release of Troye Sivan's remix of "Talk Talk" on 12 September 2024. On the same day, Rolling Stone announced that the remix album is set to be released on 11 October 2024. The remixes featuring Billie Eilish and Lorde are part of the album's track list, along with the remixes featuring Addison Rae, Yung Lean, and Robyn that were released as part of the rollout of its original tracks. Skream and Benga's remix of "Von Dutch", however, did not make the cut. The timing of the album's release also coincided with Charli XCX and Sivan's Sweat concert tour.

The album cover was posted with the caption "Brat and it's completely different but also still brat – out oct 11" on several of Charli XCX's social media accounts. These postings also included a link to pre-order the album within various streaming sites. The track list for the album was officially confirmed on 7 October 2024 when Charli XCX gave a fan the track list during her performance on the Sweat Tour in Orlando, and encouraged them to share it online after the show. She later confirmed this on her social media. The album is sold as a double cassette, double CD, double LP and previously a triple LP. Kesha's remix of "Spring Breakers" was added to the tracklist on 14 October 2024, three days after the album's original release.

Prior to the album's release, billboards appeared around the US, Europe, and Japan teasing new collaborations, confirming BB Trickz, Bon Iver, Julian Casablancas, Tinashe, Shygirl, The 1975, Jon Hopkins, The Japanese House, Bladee, Caroline Polachek, and Ariana Grande for the album. To accompany the album's release, an installation at the Storm King Art Center in New Windsor, New York was available for special viewing. Select fans were invited to the unveiling on 10 October 2024.

== Critical reception ==
Professional ratings
Aggregate scores
Source	Rating
AnyDecentMusic?	8.4/10
Metacritic	88/100
Review scores
Source	Rating
AllMusic	4/5 stars
Clash	9/10
The Daily Telegraph	4/5 stars
The Guardian	5/5 stars
The Line of Best Fit	7/10
NME	5/5 stars
Pitchfork	8.0/10
Rolling Stone	4/5 stars
Slant Magazine	4/5 stars
The Times	4/5 stars

The album received rave reviews from music critics. According to the review aggregator Metacritic, Brat and It's Completely Different but Also Still Brat received "universal acclaim" based on a weighted average score of 88 out of 100 from 12 critic scores. The review aggregator site AnyDecentMusic? compiled 8 reviews and gave the album an average of 8.4 out of 10.

Concluding the review for AllMusic, Heather Phares declared, "Much more than a victory lap, Brat and It's Completely Different but Also Still Brat enriches the Brat listening experience and the understanding of Charli XCX's artistry. Fans know she's deserved this level of acclaim for years, but the creativity and generosity on display here is more proof that it's high time mainstream finally caught up to her."

Caitlin Chatterton of Clash awarded the album a score of 9 out of 10, praising its innovative sound and artistic direction. Rachel Aroesti from The Guardian described it as a testament to Charli XCX's "unstoppable" creative phase, giving the album a perfect score of 5 out of 5.

Writing for Rolling Stone, Rob Sheffield expressed that "the Brat remix isn't just a piece of promo product—it's an ass-kicking party album in its own right", extending the phenomenon of "Brat Summer" into autumn. Similarly, Slant Magazine's Sal Cinquemani felt XCX created a "self-reflexive reaction to her success with a companion piece that's just as relevant—and just as reflective of the zeitgeist—as its parent album.

The Daily Telegraph gave a mostly positive review, highlighting the star power of the album's many collaborators, but questioned if the myriad features was a "cynical marketing ploy [...] designed to go viral".

=== Year-end lists ===
Select 2024 year-end rankings for Brat and It's Completely Different but Also Still Brat
Publication/critic	Accolade	Rank	Ref.
The Atlantic	10 Best Albums of 2024	2	
Dazed	20 Best Albums of 2024	2	
The Guardian	50 Best Albums of 2024	1	
The New York Times: Jon Pareles	Jon Pareles' Best Albums of 2024	1	
Stereogum	50 Best Albums of 2024	1	

== Commercial performance ==
The album's vinyl re-release debuted at number 8 on the US Billboard Top Album Sales and number 5 on the Top Dance Albums charts selling 8,000 copies.

== Track listing ==
Brat and It's Completely Different but Also Still Brat disc one track listing
No.	Title	Writer(s)	Remixer(s)	Length
1.	"360" (featuring Robyn and Yung Lean)	Charlotte Aitchison; Alexander Guy Cook; Henry Walter; Finn Keane; Omer Fedi; Blake Slatkin; Robin Carlsson; Jonatan Leandoer	Cook	2:09
2.	"Club Classics" (featuring BB Trickz)	Aitchison; George Daniel; Tim Nelson; Belize Kazi	Daniel; TimFromTheHouse	2:54
3.	"Sympathy Is a Knife" (featuring Ariana Grande)	Aitchison; Keane; Jonathan Shave; Grande	Keane	2:34
4.	"I Might Say Something Stupid" (featuring the 1975 and Jon Hopkins)	Aitchison; Mike Lévy; Matthew Healy; Daniel; Hopkins	Daniel; Hopkins	4:10
5.	"Talk Talk" (featuring Troye Sivan)	Aitchison; Cook; Ross Birchard; Troye Mellet; Brett McLaughlin; Kaelyn Behr; Kevin Hickey; Adam Novodor	Cook; Zhone; Novodor; Styalz Fuego	2:53
6.	"Von Dutch" (A. G. Cook remix; featuring Addison Rae)	Aitchison; Keane; Cook; Rae	Cook	2:37
7.	"Everything Is Romantic" (featuring Caroline Polachek)	Aitchison; Pablo Díaz-Reixa; Cook; Jasper Harris; Jae Deal; Marlon Barrow; Polachek	Keane	3:23
8.	"Rewind" (featuring Bladee)	Aitchison; Walter; Cook; Benjamin Reichwald	Cook	2:42
9.	"So I" (featuring A. G. Cook)	Aitchison; Keane; Shave; Cook	Cook	4:39
10.	"Girl, So Confusing" (featuring Lorde)	Aitchison; Cook; Ella Yelich-O'Connor; James Stack	Cook	3:25
11.	"Apple" (featuring the Japanese House)	Aitchison; Daniel; Linus Wiklund; Noonie Bao; Amber Bain	Daniel; the Japanese House	2:37
12.	"B2B" (featuring Tinashe)	Aitchison; Lévy; Cook; Fedi; Keane; Tinashe Kachingwe	Keane	2:33
13.	"Mean Girls" (featuring Julian Casablancas)	Aitchison; Cook; Birchard; Casablancas; Herbie Hancock	Cook; Casablancas; Jason Lader	3:46
14.	"I Think About It All the Time" (featuring Bon Iver)	Aitchison; Cook; Keane; Shave; Justin Vernon; Bonnie Raitt	Bon Iver	3:20
15.	"365" (featuring Shygirl)	Aitchison; Cook; Walter; Keane; Fedi; Slatkin; Blane Muise; Mark Archer; Chris Peat	Keane; Toby Wincorn	2:01
16.	"Guess" (featuring Billie Eilish)	Aitchison; Harrison Patrick Smith; Dylan Brady; Billie Eilish O'Connell; Finneas O'Connell	The Dare; Finneas	2:23
Total length:				48:06

Brat and It's Completely Different but Also Still Brat digital reissue disc one / Brat and It's Completely Different vinyl version
No.	Title	Writer(s)	Producer(s)	Length
17.	"Spring Breakers" (featuring Kesha)	Aitchison; Cook; Keane; Shave; Kesha Sebert	Keane	2:22
Total length:				50:28

=== Notes ===
- As with the original Brat, track titles are stylised in sentence case; featured credits are not enclosed within parentheses and are stylised in all lowercase.
- "Talk Talk featuring Troye Sivan" features uncredited additional vocals from Dua Lipa.
- Disc 2 mirrors the track listing of Brat and It's the Same but There's Three More Songs So It's Not.

=== Samples and interpolations ===
Note that these only apply to the remixes and not the original tracks.

- "Club Classics" contains an interpolation of the original version of "365".
- "So I" contains samples of "Beautiful" and "WWW", and contains an interpolation of "Xcxoplex", all written and performed by A. G. Cook, and additionally contains a sample of "OOH", written by Sophie and performed by Jaide Green.
- "I Think About It All the Time" contains an interpolation of "Nick of Time", written and performed by Bonnie Raitt.
- "365" contains a sample of "Frequency", written by Chris Peat and Mark Archer, and performed by Altern-8.
- Both versions of "Guess" interpolate "Technologic", written by Thomas Bangalter, Guy-Manuel de Homem-Christo and performed by Daft Punk.
- Both versions of "Spring Breakers" contain an interpolation of "Everytime", written by Britney Spears and Annet Artani, and performed by Spears.

== Personnel ==
Performers

- Charli XCX – vocals
- A. G. Cook – remixing (tracks 1, 5, 6, 8, 10, 13)
- Robyn – vocals (track 1)
- Yung Lean – vocals (track 1)
- George Daniel – remixing (tracks 2, 4)
- TimFromTheHouse – remixing (track 2)
- BB Trickz – vocals (track 2)
- Finn Keane – remixing (tracks 3, 7, 12, 15, 17)
- Ariana Grande – vocals (track 3)
- Jon Hopkins – remixing (track 4)
- The 1975 – vocals (track 4)
- Dua Lipa – background vocals (track 5)
- Troye Sivan – vocals (track 5)
- Novodor – remixing (track 5)
- Styalz Fuego – remixing (track 5)
- Zhone – remixing (track 5)
- Addison Rae – vocals (track 6)
- Bladee – vocals (track 8)
- Lorde – vocals (track 10)
- The Japanese House – remixing, vocals (track 11)
- Tinashe – vocals (track 12)
- Julian Casablancas – remixing, vocals (track 13)
- Jason Lader – remixing (track 13)
- Bon Iver – remixing, vocals (track 14)
- Toby Wincorn – remixing (track 15)
- Shygirl – vocals (track 15)
- The Dare – remixing (track 16)
- Finneas – remixing (track 16)
- Billie Eilish – vocals (track 16)
- Kesha – vocals (track 17)

Technical

- Idania Valencia – mastering
- Randy Merrill – mastering (track 5)
- Geoff Swan – mixing (tracks 1, 2, 4, 6–9, 11, 14, 15)
- Tom Norris – mixing (tracks 3, 5, 10, 13)
- Bart Shoudel – mixing, vocal engineering (track 12)
- Cirkut – vocal engineering (tracks 1, 8)
- George Daniel – vocal engineering (track 2)
- Jon Shave – vocal engineering (tracks 3, 9)
- Finn Keane – vocal engineering (tracks 3, 11, 14)
- A. G. Cook – vocal engineering (tracks 5, 9, 10, 13–15)
- Hudson Mohawke – vocal engineering (track 13)
- Matt Cahill – mixing assistance (tracks 1, 2, 4, 6–9, 11, 14, 15)
- Tyler Beans – engineering assistance (track 13)

== Charts ==
=== Weekly charts ===
Weekly chart performance for Brat and It's Completely Different but Also Still Brat
Chart (2024–2025)	Peak position
Croatian International Albums (HDU)	6
Danish Albums (Hitlisten)	10
Finnish Albums (Suomen virallinen lista)	28
Japanese Download Albums (Billboard Japan)	75
Lithuanian Albums (AGATA)	19
New Zealand Albums (RMNZ)	1
Norwegian Albums (VG-lista)	5
Scottish Albums (Official Charts)	4
Swedish Albums (Sverigetopplistan)	19
UK Albums (Official Charts)	40
UK Dance Albums (Official Charts)	10
US Top Album Sales (Billboard)	8
US Top Dance Albums (Billboard)	5

=== Year-end charts ===
Year-end chart performance for Brat and It's Completely Different but Also Still Brat
Chart (2025)	Position
Swedish Albums (Sverigetopplistan)	63

== Certifications ==
Certifications for Brat and It's Completely Different but Also Still Brat
Region	Certification	Certified units/sales
Denmark (IFPI Danmark)	Platinum	20,000^{‡}
New Zealand (RMNZ)	Platinum	15,000^{‡}
^{‡} Sales+streaming figures based on certification alone.

== Release history ==
Release dates and formats for Brat and It's Completely Different but Also Still Brat
Region	Release date	Format(s)	Edition	Label	Ref.
Various
Various	11 October 2024	Digital download; streaming; CD; vinyl LP	Standard	Atlantic	
Various	28 February 2025	Vinyl LP	Brat and It's Completely Different	Atlantic	
