= Girl, So Confusing =

2024 song by Charli XCX

Song by Charli XCX

from the album Brat
- Released: 7 June 2024
- Genre: Indie dance
- Length: 2:54
- Label: Atlantic
- Songwriters: Charlotte Aitchison; Alexander Guy Cook
- Producer: A. G. Cook

Lyric video
- "Girl, So Confusing" on YouTube

"Girl, So Confusing" (stylized in sentence case) is a song by the British singer Charli XCX from her sixth studio album, Brat (2024). She wrote the song with the English producer A. G. Cook, who also assisted in its production, and released it through Atlantic Records. A glitch-influenced indie dance song, "Girl, So Confusing" is built on talk-sing Auto-Tune vocals and a throbbing bassline. It deals with Charli XCX's strained relationship with another female musician.

Upon its release, fans and critics speculated about the subject of the song; many believed it to be about the Japanese-British singer Rina Sawayama, the Welsh singer Marina Diamandis, or the New Zealand singer Lorde. Charli XCX later confirmed in a profile interview with Billboard that Lorde served as the muse behind the track's subject.

A remix featuring Lorde was released on 21 June 2024. It builds on the original track's lyrics and provides an answer from Lorde, who discusses her own insecurities. The remix received universal acclaim from music critics, with many praising its lyrics and themes. It featured prominently on year-end listicles; Exclaim! and The Independent placed the remix at the top spot on their respective lists. Commercially, the remix charted in the top 40 in New Zealand and the United Kingdom, and peaked in mid-tier positions in Australia, Canada, and the United States. It received a platinum certification from Music Canada (MC).

== Background ==
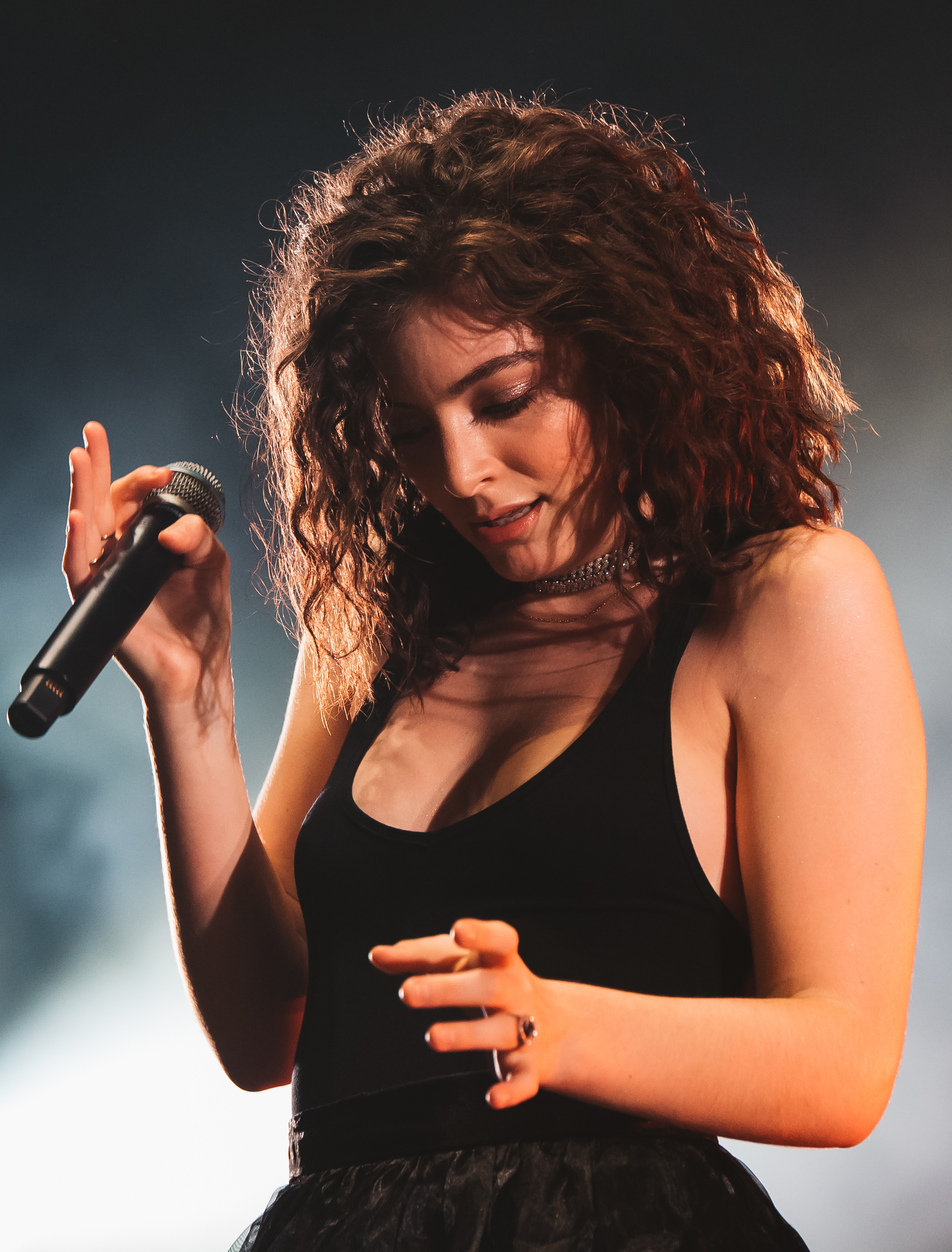
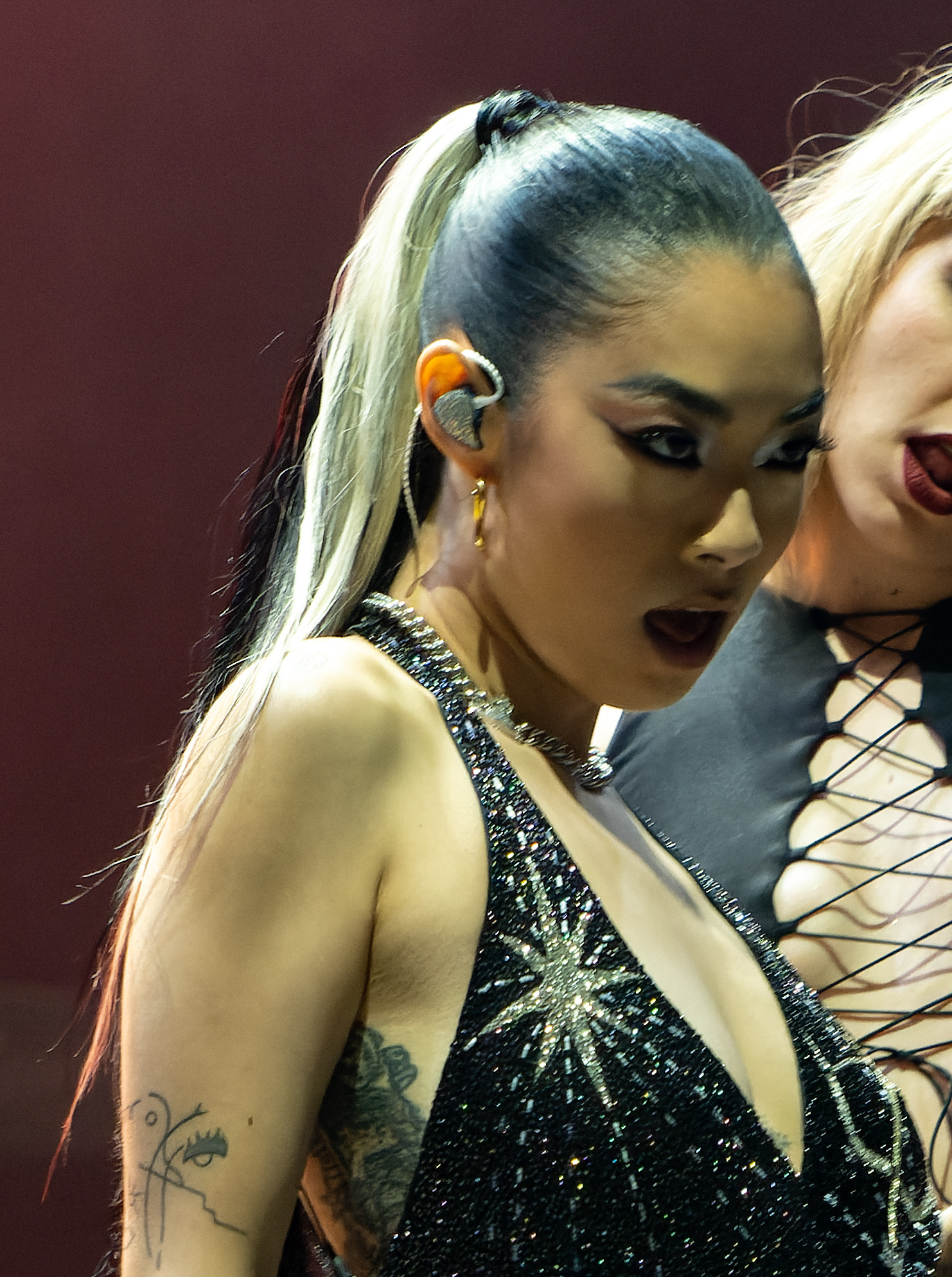
"Girl, So Confusing" was speculated by fans and critics to be about Marina Diamandis (left), Lorde (middle), and Rina Sawayama (right).

Charli XCX first teased "Girl, So Confusing" in a February 2024 interview with The Face. Shaad D'Souza then wrote that the track was "sure to send Deuxmoi and Discord servers into overdrive" as it "finds Charli singing about the fraught relationship she has with an unnamed female artist". She later clarified on her TikTok account that Brat did not contain any "diss tracks", with the exception of the album's lead single, "Von Dutch" (2024). The singer wrote the song as a way to explore the nuanced and complex relationships female pop artists are expected to maintain between one another in the limelight.

=== Speculation ===
Upon the release of Brat, Out's Mey Rude reported about fans' speculations that the song may be about the Japanese-British singer Rina Sawayama, the Welsh singer Marina Diamandis or the New Zealand singer Lorde. Charli XCX and Sawayama collaborated on the 2022 song "Beg for You", from Charli XCX's fifth studio album, Crash (2022). The following year, the pair's relationship was reported to be damaged due to a feud between Sawayama and the 1975 frontman Matty Healy. At the time, Charli XCX was engaged to the 1975's drummer George Daniel, whom she has since married. The "girl" in the track's title was speculated to be a reference to Sawayama's second studio album, Hold the Girl (2022).

=== Feud and resolution with Marina Diamandis ===
Charli XCX and Diamandis collaborated in 2013 on "Just Desserts", a standalone single used to promote Diamandis' the Lonely Hearts Club Tour, with Charli XCX performing as an opening act. In 2016, Charli XCX released a series of fruit-themed photos, shot by photographer Charlotte Rutherford, for an advertisement campaign with British fragrance company Impulse. Diamandis, who had previously worked with Rutherford, wrote on Charli XCX's Instagram account, "That Froot looks familiar!", which became a meme phrase. Charli XCX responded, stating that she did not use Diamandis' artwork for inspiration on the advertisement campaign as she was unaware of the illustrations, but confessed that after seeing the images, they shared similarities with Diamandis' photoshoot. In a comment posted on Charli XCX's private Instagram account, 360_brat, in 2023, Charli XCX stated that she felt "really hurt and upset and confused" by Diamandis' decision to respond publicly to the situation, further leading speculations that the subject of "Girl, So Confusing" was Diamandis.

However, upon the album's release and the remix of "Girl, So Confusing", Marina wrote on X, "This is beautiful. Just cried listening to it. It's so courageous and human to make work about this topic, and it's so healing to listen to it." Charli XCX responded to the post with: "Aww Marina!! Tumblr girls rise!" and Marina replied: "Crying <3 <3 <3". Rolling Stone suggested this showed that they had reconciled over their fallout on Instagram.

=== Comparison with Lorde ===
Lorde experienced mainstream success after releasing her debut single, "Royals", and debut album, Pure Heroine, in 2013. The artist's aesthetic and physical features were compared by media outlets to those of Charli XCX, who also released her debut album, True Romance, that same year and achieved mainstream success with her 2012 collaboration "I Love It" with Swedish synth-pop duo Icona Pop. In a May 2024 interview with Rolling Stone UK, Charli XCX revealed she had initially been envious of Lorde and her commercial success with "Royals" and compared her physical features with those of Lorde. However, she confessed that their different musical styles had assured her that they were "two completely different people" and that she thought this way due to insecurities about her own work.

== Composition and lyrics ==
"Girl, So Confusing" has been described as a glitch-influenced indie dance song built on talk-sing Auto-Tune vocals and a throbbing bassline. The New York Times writer Lindsay Zoladz wrote that the production had a "strobe-lit beat", while Pitchfork's Meaghan Garvey called the song "sparkly" and "scuzzy". Charli XCX's vocals were compared to those of American-French singer Uffie by PopMatters editor Nick Malone, describing them as having a "husky timbre" before changing into "unimaginably catchy spirals." Hannah Mylrea of NME compared its production to Charli XCX's 2017 hyperpop mixtape, Pop 2. Consequence writer Paolo Ragusa noted that the pitched-up "Girl!" vocal samples sound "chipper and deflated". According to Ryan Bulbeck of Renowned for Sound, the song incorporates fuzzy synths and pitched backing vocals.

Upon release, the song was widely discussed by media outlets, due to its subject matter. The lyric, "Think you should come to my party / And put your hands up" was interpreted to be a response to Lorde's 2013 single, "Team", where she sings, "I'm kind of over gettin' told to throw my hands up in the air / So there". The line "You're all about writing poems" was viewed as a reference to Lorde's poetic songwriting and Melodrama track, "Writer in the Dark" (2017). Exclaim! described the song as being a "bit petty, a bit sweet, bravely embarrassing, and combative". During an interview with Matt Rogers and Bowen Yang for their Las Culturistas podcast, Charli XCX affirmed that while she respects the growing companionship between female artists in pop music, she also sees the nuances between said relationships: "I don't think you become a bad feminist if you maybe don't see eye to eye with every single woman. That's not the nature of human beings. There's a competitiveness between us. There's envy. There's camaraderie. There's all of these different dynamics."

== Commercial performance ==
"Girl, So Confusing" peaked at number 28 on the UK Singles Chart. The track charted for five weeks. It debuted at number 63 on the US Billboard Hot 100 and charted for two weeks. It peaked at number 3 on the Hot Dance/Electronic Songs chart and placed at number 17 on its year-end chart. On the Billboard auxiliary Dance/Electronic Streaming Songs and Dance/Electronic Digital Song Sales charts, the track peaked at number two, behind American DJ Marshmello and American singer Kane Brown's 2024 collaboration "Miles on It". It became the highest-charting single for both artists. In the Canadian Hot 100, the track peaked at number 57 and charted for two weeks. The track peaked at number 50 on the ARIA Charts. It peaked at number 59 on the Billboard Global 200 chart. In New Zealand, the song peaked at number 24. It received a platinum certification from Music Canada (MC) for sales of 80,000 units.

== Lorde remix ==
"Girl, So Confusing featuring Lorde (Note: The remix was originally titled "The Girl, So Confusing version with Lorde".)" (remix)

Promotional single by Charli XCX and Lorde

from the album Brat and It's Completely Different but Also Still Brat
- Released: 21 June 2024
- Length: 3:26
- Label: Atlantic
- Songwriters: Charlotte Aitchison; Ella Yelich-O'Connor; Alexander Guy Cook
- Producer: A. G. Cook

Audio video
- "Girl, So Confusing featuring Lorde" on YouTube

=== Background and release ===
Charli XCX attempted communication with Lorde for a collaboration for almost a year but was unsuccessful in meeting with the singer to write material. In a Billboard interview, she stated that this "spoke to the narrative of the song itself." A day before releasing Brat, Charli XCX sent Lorde a voice note explaining that she was the inspiration behind the song. She revealed to New Zealand radio DJ Zane Lowe on his Apple Music 1 show that she was prepared for Lorde to "never speak to her again." Due to time zone differences between Charli XCX and Lorde, who resides in New Zealand, she heard the song before receiving Charli XCX's message. Lorde replied instantly, however, apologising for her actions and suggested that she feature on a remix of the track. Charli XCX revealed that the remix took three days to materialise.

Upon the release of Brat, Lorde praised the album on her Instagram Stories, revealing it was the "only album [she's] ever pre-saved". On 11 June 2024, Lorde attended Charli XCX's show at the Brooklyn Paramount Theater. Charli XCX announced a collaboration with Lorde on 20 June 2024 by hiring a team of house painters who painted Lorde's name on a white wall located in Greenpoint, Brooklyn. A remix of the track with Lorde was released the following day. The remix was included as the tenth track on her first remix album, Brat and It's Completely Different but Also Still Brat. The two performed the remix at Charli XCX and Troye Sivan's Sweat show in Madison Square Garden in September 2024, at the Coachella music festival in April 2025, and during Lorde's Ultrasound World Tour date at the Kia Forum in October 2025.

Lorde stated that writing her verse for the remix led her to feel "deep empathy" for Charli XCX, but "misunderstood" with a sense of urgency to "make it right" between the two. The singer also credits Charli XCX for opening a "channel" between them and allowing her to say things she had not said before. After the remix was released, Charli XCX posted a screenshot of Lorde's text message in which she sent Charli XCX the entirety of her verse, to which the latter replied, "Fucking hell".

=== Themes and lyrical interpretation ===
The remix expands on the original track's discussion of complex and competitive dynamics within female friendships, jealousy, insecurities, and rivalry, and provides an answer from Lorde, who explores her struggles with body image, disordered eating, and self-confidence on her verse. Lorde's verse was described by critics as "honest", "vulnerable", and "cathartic". Clash declared the remix an "inversion" of the original, calling it a "celebration of female energy and a condemnation of the aspects that keep women apart." Similarly, Exclaim! noted that the remix reframed the original track's "nervy monologue into a healing and surprisingly affecting dialogue between two left-field pop stars who've been pitted against one another" since their adolescent years. The lyrics were described by The New York Times as being "mutually messy risk-taking, honest reckoning with the fun-house mirrors of fame and conflict resolution you can dance to."

=== Critical reception ===
Upon release, the song received universal acclaim from music critics, many of whom praised the song's lyrics and themes, calling it one of the most important pop culture moments of the year. Vulture's Jason P. Frank and Alejandra Gularte wrote that Lorde's verse "fits directly into the world of Brat" due to its honesty. Jeremy D. Larson of Pitchfork awarded the song its Best New Track distinction, calling it a "meeting of the minds, two great pop stars being vulnerable and self-aware while making a watershed moment in pop in the process." Clash writer Robin Murray called it a milestone and revelatory, awarding it a 9 out of 10 score. The New York Times editor Lindsay Zoladz called it a refreshing moment, while Exclaim!'s Kaelen Bell selected it as one of the publication's staff picks, stating that it was a "watershed moment" amid the "anodyne therapy and straining empowerment" prevalent in the "last decade of pop music". Similarly, Derrick Rossignol of Uproxx awarded the song its Best New Pop distinction, while The Guardian writer Alim Kheraj called it the year's most powerful pop moment.

The track was further praised by music critics following the release of Brat's remix album, Brat and It's Completely Different but Also Still Brat. AP News, Dazed, and DIY ranked the song as the best song from the remix album. Billboard ranked it fifth in their song ranking of the remix album, with Katie Bain stating that the track helped to "draw out the true confessions of big stars like Ariana Grande and the 1975's Matty Healy." The remix won the 2024 Popjustice £20 Music Prize, a prize which recognises the best British pop single of the year. The remix ranked at number one in a readers poll published by Pitchfork. In May 2025, the collaboration won the award for Single of the Year at the New Zealand 2025 Aotearoa Music Awards.

Select year-end rankings for "Girl, So Confusing featuring Lorde"
Critic/Organization	Rank	Published year
Business Insider	1	2024
Exclaim!	1	2024
The Independent	1	2024
The New York Times (Note: The remix's placement is based on Lindsay Zoladz's year-end list. She is one of three music critics who published their year-end lists with The New York Times.)	2	2024
The Guardian	3 (Note: The remix shares the position with three other Charli XCX songs: "Guess" featuring Billie Eilish, "360", and "Von Dutch".)	2024
Consequence	3	2024
NME	4	2024
Billboard	6	2024
Pitchfork	9	2024
Rolling Stone	9	2024

Select mid-decade rankings for "Girl, So Confusing featuring Lorde"
Critic/Organization	Rank	Published year
Paste	16	2024
Pitchfork	25	2024

== Charts ==
=== Weekly charts ===
Weekly chart performance for "Girl, So Confusing"
Chart (2024–2025)	Peak position
Australia (ARIA)	50
Australia Dance (ARIA)	3
Ireland (IRMA)	25
UK Singles (Official Charts)	28
US Hot Dance/Electronic Songs (Billboard)	24

Weekly chart performance for "Girl, So Confusing featuring Lorde"
Chart (2024)	Peak position
Australia (ARIA)	50
Canada Hot 100 (Billboard)	57
Global 200 (Billboard)	59
Greece International (IFPI)	99
New Zealand (Recorded Music NZ)	24
US Billboard Hot 100	63
US Hot Dance/Electronic Songs (Billboard)	3

=== Year-end charts ===
2024 year-end chart performance for "Girl, So Confusing featuring Lorde"
Chart (2024)	Position
US Hot Dance/Electronic Songs (Billboard)	17

== Certifications ==
Region	Certification	Certified units/sales
Canada (Music Canada)	Platinum	80,000^{‡}
New Zealand (RMNZ)	Platinum	30,000^{‡}
United Kingdom (BPI)	Gold	400,000^{‡}
^{‡} Sales+streaming figures based on certification alone.
