= Dana Marlowe =

US social entrepreneur and activist

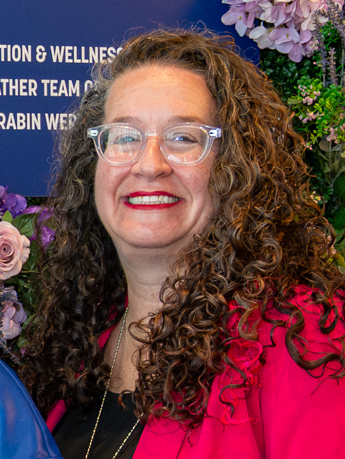
- Marlowe in 2025
- Born: Manhattan, New York, U.S.
- Education: Rochester Institute of Technology (A.A.S.); Rochester Institute of Technology (B.S.); The University of Texas at Austin (M.A.)
- Occupations: Social entrepreneurship (CEO), philanthropy
- Years active: 2015–present
- Known for: I Support the Girls, women rights activism, Accessibility Partners
- Spouse: Preston Blay
- Website: isupportthegirls.org

Dana Marlowe is an American social entrepreneur, philanthropist, women rights activist and disability advocate. She is best known for founding I Support the Girls, an American nonprofit organization with the main focus on providing homeless and vulnerable women with hygiene products. Marlowe is founder of Accessibility Partners, a private IT consultancy in the area of technological accessibility for people with disabilities. She is also a frequent commentator on social issues and feminism in media outlets.

== Early biography ==
Dana Marlowe was born to a middle-class Jewish family in Manhattan and brought up in Rockland County, New York. At the age of 12, Marlowe lost her father who suffered from brain cancer. She graduated from Rochester Institute of Technology where she received a B.S. degree in Professional & Technical Communication and an A.A.S. in Sign Language Interpreting. Continuing her studies at The University of Texas at Austin, she graduated with master's degree in Interpersonal & Organizational Communication. While still at Rochester Institute of Technology, Marlowe worked as a sign-language interpreter.

== Career ==
While still on maternity leave in 2009, Marlowe launched Accessibility Partners, a private IT firm specializing in counsel training, and other services to organizations and businesses to accommodate people with disabilities, placing particular emphasis on equal access to technology usage. The company's clients include the Library of Congress, Amazon and the Kennedy Center.

=== I Support the Girls ===
The charity started accidentally: Marlowe didn't know what to do with her supply of bras and decided to donate them. Once she realized there was no specific charity dedicated to female undergarments, she founded I Support the Girls in July 2015. The nonprofit's initial focus was on donating bras to homeless and economically disadvantaged women and girls as well as of hygiene products intended for women and people who are experiencing homelessness, poverty, are refugees and evacuees of natural disasters. In her tenure as the Executive Director and Founder at I Support the Girls, Dana Marlowe visited many shelters and facilitated creation of new affiliations in the US and abroad involving more women to philanthropic activity. As of October 2019, the organization had 58 affiliates in the US, Australia, Canada, Philippines, Pakistan, Thailand and more. According to a number of sources including The Washington Post and The New York Times, the organization supported female federal employees during 2018–19 United States federal government shutdown and is still active during COVID-19 pandemic.

== Personal life ==
Marlowe and her husband Preston Blay live in Silver Spring, Maryland. They have two sons. Micah Blay (17) and Riley Blay(14)
