= BB Trickz =

Spanish rapper (born 2000)

- Born: Belize Ainoa Nicolau Kazi; 28 April 2000 (age 26); Barcelona, Catalonia, Spain
- Genres: Drill, pop rap, dembow
- Occupation: Rapper
- Instrument: Vocals
- Years active: 2023–present
- Labels: Virgin; Sony Spain; Columbia

Belize Ainoa Nicolau Kazi (born 2000), known professionally as BB Trickz (stylized in sentence case), is a Spanish rapper. She began rapping in 2023, releasing her first two extended plays (EPs)—Trickstar and Sadtrickz—that year. Her music is known for its humorous and provocative lyrics and its influences from American hip hop styles such as sample drill.

== Life and career ==
Belize Ainoa Nicolau Kazi was born in 2000 and raised in Barcelona. She worked as a child model, starring in an advertisement for Nesquik and appearing on the cover of ESO books, and as a child singer in the group Oh!Cake & The Cookie. She is Spanish, from Catalonia; her mother is Canadian of Bengali descent and works as an acupuncturist and practitioner of traditional Chinese medicine and her father, who she spent less time with growing up, is a DJ and record producer who goes by An Der Beat and plays Brazilian funk music. She has said that she was bullied while in school.

In September 2022, Kazi decided to start rapping professionally under the name BB Trickz—derived from Beatrix, the name of the protagonist from the 2003 film Kill Bill, which Kazi's mother allowed her to watch as a child as a birthday present. A snippet of her song "Bambi" posted to TikTok in February 2024 went viral. She released "Missionsuicida", her debut single, on 15 April 2023 with an accompanying music video. The song samples the theme song of the television series Law & Order: Special Victims Unit and gained popularity on TikTok, as did her follow-up single "Bambi". Soon after, it was announced that she had been signed to Virgin Music Group. Her debut extended play (EP), Trickstar, was released nine days later through Virgin, with its beats all downloaded from YouTube. Her first live performance was at Rolling Loud in Portugal in July 2023. She appeared in Veeze's music video for his song "Overseas Baller", released in August 2023. She released Sadtrickz, her second EP, on 29 November 2023 through Sony Music. She was featured on the remix to "Club Classics" on Charli XCX's remix album Brat and It's Completely Different but Also Still Brat, released on October 11 2024.

In April 2025, Kazi appeared on a Spanish-language podcast where she said she could learn from Donald Trump and Adolf Hitler.

== Musical style ==
BB Trickz makes drill music that takes influence from American hip hop music, including sample drill, in songs that are usually around 90 seconds long. According to her, she does not write her lyrics and primarily freestyles. Her inspirations include rappers Cash Cobain, Shawny Binladen and singer Amy Winehouse. Shaad D'Souza, for Dazed, wrote that she was an "acid-tongued lyricist" whose music was defined by its provocative and humorous nature, while Elliot Hoste, for the same magazine, wrote that both her visual and musical styles were "playful" with "a deft sense of humour". Interview's Julian Ribeiro described her lyrics as "raunchy". Nestor Parrondo, for GQ España, described BB Trickz's rapping voice as a whisper, while ABC contrasted the "humor" and "provocation" of her music with her "small figure" and "shyness". She has been called the Spanish version of American rapper Ice Spice due to similarities in their sound. She has also been accused by critics and social media users of appropriating her urbano aesthetic.

== Discography ==
=== Extended plays ===
Title	Details	Peak chart positions
Title	Details	SPA
Trickstar	Released: April 24, 2023; Label: Virgin Spain; Format: Digital download, streaming	25
Sadtrickz	Released: November 29, 2023; Label: Sony Spain; Format: Digital download, streaming	-
80’z	Released: April 8, 2025; Label: Sony Spain; Format: Digital download, streaming	-
lechita	Released: October 1, 2025; Label: Sony Spain; Format: Digital download, streaming	-
DepresionTrickz (with Depresión Sonora)	Released: October 9, 2025; Label: Sony Spain; Format: Digital download, streaming	-
sugarhiii	Released: June 11, 2026; Label: Columbia Records; Format: Digital download, streaming	-

=== Singles ===
List of singles as lead artist, showing year released and album title
Title	Year	Album
"Missionsuicida"	2023	Trickstar
"Bambi"	2023	Non-album singles
"Gra"	2023	Non-album singles
"Viva España!!!"	2023	Non-album singles
"Charlie Brown"	2023	Non-album singles
"Lil Peep"	2023	Sadtrickz
"Soy la Más Mala de España" (with Bryant LR)	2024	Non-album singles
"Jálale Alv" (with Kevin AMF)	2024	Non-album singles
"Trickstar" (with El Baby R)	2024	Non-album singles
"Yo Soy el Más Chulo de España" (with Omar Montes and Tino JJ and featuring El Baby R)	2024	Non-album singles
"Pharrell" (with Karrahbooo)	2024	Non-album singles
"Miss Rackz"	2024	Non-album singles
"I wonder"	2024	Non-album singles
"Not A Pretty Girl"	2025	80z
"Super"	2025	80z
"Maldita" (with Yeri Mua)	2025	De Chava (Deluxe)
"Le Le"	2026	Sugarhiii
"A la mala"	2026	Sugarhiii
"Poonte perritaa"	2026	Non-album singles
"Algo bien" (with Chapo 240)	2026	Non-album singles
"Las mias son peluche" (with Fusil Ametrallalo)	2026	Non-album singles

=== Other charted songs ===
Title	Year	Peak chart positions			Album
Title	Year	NZ Hot	US Bub.	US Dance	Album
"Club Classics" (Charli XCX featuring BB Trickz)	2024	7	13	8	Brat and It's Completely Different but Also Still Brat

=== Guest appearances ===
List of non-single guest appearances, with other performing artists, showing year released and album name
Title	Year	Other artist	Album
"Skater Dater"	2024	Eyedress, Elvia	Vampire in Beverly Hills
"Club Classics"	2024	Charli XCX	Brat and It's Completely Different but Also Still Brat
"BB Belt" (Remix)	2024	Ice Spice	Y2K! : I'm Just A Girl (Deluxe)
"Boss Babies"	2025	Theodora	Méga BBL
"Joven y Salvaje"	2026	Benny Blanco	Hermoso
