= Guess (song) =

2024 single by Charli XCX

Single by Charli XCX featuring Billie Eilish

from the album Brat and It's Completely Different but Also Still Brat
- Released: 1 August 2024
- Recorded: July 2024
- Genre: Electroclash; hyperpop
- Length: 2:23
- Label: Atlantic
- Songwriters: Charlotte Aitchison; Billie Eilish O'Connell; Harrison Patrick Smith; Dylan Brady; Finneas O'Connell
- Producer: The Dare

Charli XCX singles chronology
| "360" (2024) | "Guess" (2024) | "Apple" (2024) |

Billie Eilish singles chronology
| "Birds of a Feather" (2024) | "Guess" (2024) | "Chihiro" (2025) |

Music video
- "Guess featuring Billie Eilish" on YouTube

"Guess" is a song by British singer Charli XCX from Brat and It's the Same but There's Three More Songs So It's Not, the deluxe edition of her sixth studio album, Brat (2024). A remix version featuring American singer-songwriter Billie Eilish was released on 1 August 2024 as a single from Brat and It's Completely Different but Also Still Brat, the remix album of Brat. Released alongside a music video from which 10,000 items of underwear were donated to I Support the Girls, the remix marked the first studio collaboration by Eilish in several years and was the fourth remix from Brat.

"Guess" received positive reviews from critics and entered the top of the UK Singles Chart, and at number twelve on the Billboard Hot 100. It also topped the Billboard Hot Dance/Electronic Songs chart, as well as the charts in Australia, Ireland, Lithuania, and New Zealand, and peaked within the top ten of the charts in Canada, Norway, and Sweden. The song became Charli XCX's first UK number one as a solo artist. The remix received a nomination for Best Pop Duo/Group Performance at the 67th Annual Grammy Awards and won the 2025 Brit Award for Song of the Year.

== Original version and background ==
The original version of "Guess" was released on 10 June 2024 through Atlantic Records as the seventeenth track of the deluxe version of her sixth studio album, Brat. It was produced by the Dare and co-written with Dylan Brady of 100 Gecs, and interpolates Daft Punk's 2005 song "Technologic". "Guess" makes references to guessing the colour of her underwear and cunnilingus. Upon release, the song was described as "extremely horny" by Kaelen Bell of Exclaim!

In May 2024, Eilish stated in an interview with Zane Lowe that she had been in a studio for the first time in several years and had recorded a collaboration with an artist she was a huge fan of. She also mentioned that she had previously resisted such collaborations due to nervousness. Charli XCX had previously expressed an interest in collaborating with Eilish as early as 2017, though the pair were unable to find an appropriate song.

On 31 July 2024, Charli XCX shared a post with the artwork of the remix, asking followers to guess based on the cover showing just the lower profiles of both artists. The singer is seen wearing a white mini-skirt while the collaborator wears baggy jeans and several rings on their hand. Based on the details, fans quickly figured out the featured artist to be Eilish. That same day, fans shared pictures of flyers asking people to call a phone number that plays a snippet of the remix.

== Release and music video ==
Charli XCX and Billie Eilish in the music video for the song

On 31 July, Charli XCX confirmed the remix with Eilish and announced the release for the following day. It is the fifth remix of a Brat track, following "Girl, So Confusing" with Lorde, "360" with Yung Lean and Robyn, "Von Dutch" with Skream and Benga, and "Von Dutch" with Addison Rae. Eilish's verse features a little extra bass, which Anna Gaca of Pitchfork interpreted as representing Eilish "spott[ing] the girl she likes and her heart's pounding". An accompanying music video directed by Aidan Zamiri was released alongside the remix. According to Zamiri, the video was filmed on 28 July 2024, only four days ahead of its release. The video starts in a house party hosted by Charli XCX, where Eilish appears driving a skiploader through the wall. The two then walk on a street where panties are falling from the sky before climbing a pile of them.

"There's people for every style. Just because somebody is experiencing homelessness doesn't mean that they don't prefer to wear a thong."

— Dana Marlowe talking to BBC Newsbeat in August 2024

The video ends with a message that the undergarments not worn in the video would be donated to I Support the Girls, an American charity which distributes underwear and period products to women suffering domestic violence, homelessness, and hardship. The charity later stated that it had received 10,000 pairs, much of which was "sexy", and its founder Dana Marlowe stated that they welcomed such a donation on the grounds that it was important to them to encourage choice.

== Reception ==
The song was received positively. Marcus Wratten of PinkNews described the song as "super-sapphic", while Talecia Vescio of Junkee Media wrote that the song served "cunt". Robin Murray of Clash wrote that the song's "seismic, system shaking, Earth shuddering electronics [revel] in Millennial tropes – French touch and electroclash – while also pirouetting to the future [and] remaining loyal to her hyper pop fantasies". In addition, Anna Gaca of Pitchfork described the track as "a cheeky, bikini, high-rise, hipster remix" of the original, and the track's release elicited reactions from Amelia Dimoldenberg, Julia Fox, Adam Lambert, Suki Waterhouse, Addison Rae, Daisy Edgar-Jones, and Rita Ora.

One fan described Eilish's lyrics "Charli likes boys but she knows I'd hit it" as "predatory" and accused her of queerbaiting, prompting an angry response from Eilish's brother Finneas O'Connell. Many fans interpreted a whispered lyric at the end of the track, "You wanna guess what me and Billie have been textin' about? (You've been disrespectful)/ Still tryin' to guess the password to my Google Drive (Are you obsessed with me?)/ You wanna guess the address of the party we're at (You know you're not invited)", to be a jab at Taylor Swift, because her album The Tortured Poets Department had obstructed both Charli XCX's Brat and Eilish's Hit Me Hard and Soft from the top of the UK Albums Chart and Billboard 200, respectively.

Critics' year-end rankings of "Guess (Remix)"
| Publication | List | Rank | Ref. |
|---|---|---|---|
| Hot Press | 50 Best Tracks of 2024 | 19 | |
| Slant Magazine | The 50 Best Songs of 2024 | 11 | |
| The Guardian | The 20 Best Songs of 2024 | 3 | |
| The Quietus | Tracks of the Year 2024 | 5 | |

== Accolades ==
Awards and nominations for "Guess featuring Billie Eilish"
| Year | Award | Category | Result | Ref. |
|---|---|---|---|---|
| 2024 | MTV Europe Music Awards | Best Collaboration | Nominated | |
| 2024 | MTV Video Music Awards | Song of Summer | Nominated | |
| 2024 | Musa Awards | International Collaboration of the Year | Nominated | |
| 2024 | UK Music Video Awards | Best Dance/Electronic Video – UK | Nominated | |
| 2024 | UK Music Video Awards | Best Production Design in a Video | Nominated | |
| 2025 | Grammy Awards | Best Pop Duo/Group Performance | Nominated | |
| 2025 | Art Directors Guild Awards | Excellence in Production Design for a Music Video or Webseries | Nominated | |
| 2025 | Brit Awards | Song of the Year | Won | |
| 2025 | MTV Video Music Awards | Video for Good | Won | |
| 2025 | MTV Video Music Awards | Best Direction | Nominated | |
| 2025 | MTV Video Music Awards | Best Art Direction | Nominated | |
| 2025 | MTV Video Music Awards | Best Editing | Nominated | |

== Charts ==
=== Weekly charts ===
2024 chart performance for "Guess"
| Chart | Peak position |
|---|---|
| Belgium (Ultratop 50 Flanders) | 45 |
| New Zealand Hot Singles (Recorded Music NZ) | 28 |
| Singapore (RIAS) | 11 |
| South Africa (TOSAC) | 32 |
| United Arab Emirates (IFPI) | 17 |
| US Hot Dance/Electronic Songs (Billboard) | 16 |

2025 chart performance for "Guess"
| Chart | Peak position |
|---|---|
| New Zealand (Recorded Music NZ) | 35 |

Weekly chart performance for "Guess" remix
| Chart (2024–2025) | Peak position |
|---|---|
| Argentina Hot 100 (Billboard) | 100 |
| Australia (ARIA) | 1 |
| Austria (Ö3 Austria Top 40) | 3 |
| Belgium (Ultratop 50 Flanders) | 38 |
| Brazil Streaming (Brasil Hot 100) | 46 |
| Canada Hot 100 (Billboard) | 9 |
| Croatia (Billboard) | 12 |
| Croatia International Airplay (Top lista) | 29 |
| Croatian International Albums (HDU) 7-inch vinyl | 21 |
| Czech Republic Singles Digital (ČNS IFPI) | 5 |
| Denmark (Tracklisten) | 8 |
| Finland (Suomen virallinen lista) | 11 |
| France (SNEP) | 53 |
| Germany (GfK) | 14 |
| Global 200 (Billboard) | 3 |
| Greece International (IFPI) | 10 |
| Hungary (Single Top 40) | 30 |
| Iceland (Tónlistinn) | 8 |
| Ireland (IRMA) | 1 |
| Israel (Mako Hitlist) | 49 |
| Italy (FIMI) | 49 |
| Japan Hot Overseas (Billboard Japan) | 9 |
| Latvia Streaming (LaIPA) | 1 |
| Lithuania (AGATA) | 1 |
| Luxembourg (Billboard) | 8 |
| Netherlands (Single Top 100) | 14 |
| New Zealand (Recorded Music NZ) | 1 |
| Norway (VG-lista) | 9 |
| Poland (Polish Streaming Top 100) | 9 |
| Portugal (AFP) | 7 |
| Romania Airplay (TopHit) | 190 |
| Slovakia Singles Digital (ČNS IFPI) | 11 |
| South Korea BGM (Circle) | 113 |
| South Korea Download (Circle) | 118 |
| Spain (PROMUSICAE) | 36 |
| Sweden (Sverigetopplistan) | 7 |
| Switzerland (Schweizer Hitparade) | 5 |
| UK Singles (Official Charts) | 1 |
| US Billboard Hot 100 | 12 |
| US Hot Dance/Electronic Songs (Billboard) | 1 |
| US Hot Dance/Pop Songs (Billboard) | 3 |

=== Monthly charts ===
Monthly chart performance for "Guess"
| Chart (2024) | Peak position |
|---|---|
| Czech Republic (Singles Digitál Top 100) | 22 |
| Lithuania Airplay (TopHit) | 35 |
| Panama (PRODUCE) | 190 |
| Slovakia (Singles Digitál Top 100) | 25 |

=== Year-end charts ===
2024 year-end chart performance for "Guess"
| Chart (2024) | Position |
|---|---|
| Australia (ARIA) | 100 |
| Global 200 (Billboard) | 189 |
| UK Singles (OCC) | 73 |
| US Hot Dance/Electronic Songs (Billboard) | 9 |

2025 year-end chart performance for "Guess"
| Chart (2025) | Position |
|---|---|
| Australia (ARIA) | 73 |
| Global 200 (Billboard) | 166 |
| US Hot Dance/Pop Songs (Billboard) | 7 |

== Certifications ==
Certifications for "Guess"
| Region | Certification | Certified units/sales |
|---|---|---|
| Canada (Music Canada) | 3× Platinum | 240,000^{‡} |
| New Zealand (RMNZ) | 2× Platinum | 60,000^{‡} |
^{‡} Sales+streaming figures based on certification alone.

Certifications for "Guess" (remix)
| Region | Certification | Certified units/sales |
|---|---|---|
| Australia (ARIA) | Platinum | 70,000^{‡} |
| Austria (IFPI Austria) | Gold | 15,000^{‡} |
| Belgium (BRMA) | Gold | 20,000^{‡} |
| Denmark (IFPI Danmark) | Gold | 45,000^{‡} |
| New Zealand (RMNZ) | Gold | 15,000^{‡} |
| France (SNEP) | Gold | 100,000^{‡} |
| Poland (ZPAV) | 2× Platinum | 100,000^{‡} |
| Portugal (AFP) | Gold | 5,000^{‡} |
| Spain (Promusicae) | Gold | 30,000^{‡} |
| United Kingdom (BPI) | Platinum | 600,000^{‡} |
^{‡} Sales+streaming figures based on certification alone.

== Release history ==
Release dates and formats for "Guess"
| Region | Date | Format(s) | Version | Label | Ref. |
|---|---|---|---|---|---|
| Various | 1 August 2024 | Digital download; streaming | Remix featuring Billie Eilish | Atlantic | |
| Various | 11 November 2024 | 7-inch vinyl | Original | Atlantic | |

== See also ==
- List of Billboard number-one dance songs of 2024
