= 360 (song) =

2024 single by Charli XCX

Single by Charli XCX

from the album Brat
- Released: 10 May 2024
- Genre: Synth-pop; electropop; hyperpop; dance-pop; electroclash
- Length: 2:13
- Label: Atlantic
- Songwriters: Charlotte Aitchison; Alexander Guy Cook; Blake Slatkin; Finn Keane; Henry Walter; Omer Fedi
- Producers: A. G. Cook; Cirkut

Charli XCX singles chronology
"Von Dutch" (2024)	"360" (2024)	"Guess" (2024)

Music video
- "360" on YouTube

"360" is a song by British singer Charli XCX. It was released on 10 May 2024 through Atlantic Records as the fourth single from her sixth studio album, Brat, wherein it was included as the opening track. Featuring minimalist electropop and hyperpop production by A. G. Cook and Cirkut and deadpan singing by Charli XCX, its boastful, tongue-in-cheek lyrics make references to her musical career, her reverence in the music industry, and her friends Julia Fox and Gabbriette. Its Aidan Zamiri-directed music video stars an ensemble cast of online "it girl" influencers, models, and actresses, including Fox, Gabbriette, Rachel Sennott, and Chloë Sevigny, and begins with a skit in which they meet at dinner to find a "new hot Internet girl".

"360" was critically lauded for its catchiness and memorable lyrical catchphrases—the latter of which, particularly "I'm so Julia", were the subjects of Internet memes, merchandising, and critical analysis—and nominated for the Grammy Award for Record of the Year. Its music video received similar praise, winning the UK Music Video Award for Video of the Year and earning nominations for an MTV Video Music Award, an MTV Europe Music Award, and the Grammy Award for Best Music Video. "360" peaked at number 11 on the UK Singles Chart and on the Irish Singles Chart and at number 41 on the Billboard Hot 100.

Charli XCX performed "360" live throughout her co-headlining tour with Troye Sivan, Sweat, and on her solo Brat Tour. She also performed it on an episode of Saturday Night Live that she hosted and during a surprise set in Times Square. It was remixed by Aminé and covered by Tourist and Blossoms, both for BBC Radio 1, while an official remix of "360" featuring Swedish singer Robyn and Swedish rapper Yung Lean was released on 31 May 2024. Critics commended it for Robyn's verses but some criticised it for its underutilisation of Robyn.

== Release and promotion ==
"360" was released through Atlantic Records on 10 May 2024. It was the second single from Charli XCX's sixth studio album, Brat, after "Von Dutch" and the album's fourth pre-release following the promotional single release for her songs "Club Classics" and "B2B". Brat was released on 7 June 2024, with "360" as its opening track.

Charli XCX premiered "360" during a pop-up event in early May 2024 in Greenpoint, Brooklyn, where she danced to the song on top of an SUV in front of a wall painted the same shade of green as Brat's cover art. It later became known as the "brat wall" and, in June 2024, was painted to read, "I'm your fav reference", a lyric from "360". T-shirts and keychains based on the lyrics of "360" were sold on Charli XCX's website starting in July 2024.

== Composition ==
"360"
A 20-second snippet of the chorus of "360". Charli XCX rap-sings in a deadpan tone over a minimal electropop beat.

"360" is a hyperpop, synth-pop, electropop, dance-pop, and electroclash song. It was produced by Charli XCX's longtime collaborator A. G. Cook with Canadian record producer Cirkut and written by Charli XCX, Blake Slatkin, and Omer Fedi. Cook stated that the song was made "really quickly" due to Charli XCX having a clear vision for it. It has minimalist, synth-led production and Charli XCX rap-sings on it in a deadpan tone with slightly pitch-raised vocals. Written in common time in the key of C major, it runs for two minutes and 13 seconds at 120 beats per minute.

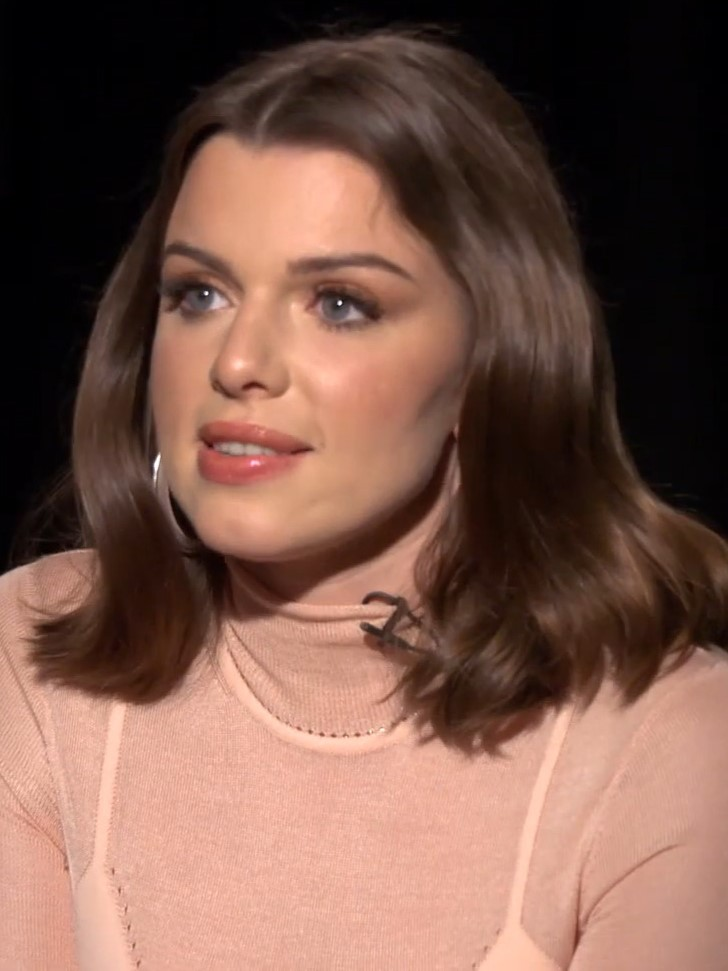
The chorus of "360" references actress Julia Fox (pictured)—who also appeared in the song's music video—with its lyric "I'm everywhere, I'm so Julia". The phrase became a popular Internet meme.

Carrie Battan of The New Yorker described the lyrics of "360" as "an assemblage of vague ideas about glamour and celebrities that listeners can disappear into"; The Daily Beast's Coleman Spilde jokingly referred to the song as a "hot girl hymn" due to its focus on "the subject of hotness". The song opens with the lyric "I went my own way and I made it/I'm your favorite reference, baby", which Hannah Mylrea of NME detailed as Charli XCX expressing "self-confidence, celebration and the knowledge of the place [she] holds in the musical landscape" and which Laura Snapes of The Guardian called "indicative of her cult status" and her "wealth of lore". She describes herself as "666 with a princess streak", which Grace Robins-Somerville of Paste wrote typified the most common definition of a "brat" as "badly behaved" and "not afraid to cause a scene" and which Brittany Allen of Literary Hub joked was "invok[ing] the devil". She also "venomously" sings in another verse, "If you love it, if you hate it/I don't fucking care what you think". Spilde wrote that the lyric was Charli XCX's way of expressing that "she couldn't be more tired of critics conflating her ego-inflated persona with the quality of her music".

Its further lyrics reference several of Charli XCX's colleagues and friends: Cook ("You gon' jump if A. G. made it"); model Gabbriette ("Call me Gabbriette, you're so inspired")—the lead singer of the disbanded punk rock band Nasty Cherry, which Charli XCX formed for the Netflix docuseries I'm with the Band: Nasty Cherry, and wife to Matty Healy, who is bandmates in the 1975 with Charli XCX's husband George Daniel—and, in the song's chorus, actress Julia Fox ("I'm everywhere, I'm so Julia"), who rose to prominence for her role in the 2019 film Uncut Gems and her highly publicised relationship with Kanye West. In a 2023 interview with Fox, Charli XCX told her that the lyric "I'm so Julia" was "about how [Fox] started every trend of 2022". The song contains an interpolation of Ciara and Missy Elliott's "1, 2 Step".

Matthew Kim, for The Line of Best Fit, wrote that the confident lyrics of "360" "sound less like re-affirmations of [Charli XCX's] greatness and more like attempts to convince herself of it" within the context of Brat, which he called "easily the most insecure, dark album Charli has ever released". Abigail Firth, for Dork, also wrote that the "cocky and cunty" atmosphere of "360" is shown to "serve as a facade" based on the insecurities she expresses throughout the rest of the album.

== Reception and impact ==
Jason P. Frank of Vulture and Thom Donovan of American Songwriter both praised "360" as "one of the best pop songs of the year", with Frank calling it a "sonic sugar rush" and Donovan writing that it "may be her best yet". For Paste's review of Brat, Eric Bennett named "360" "an all-timer in [Charli XCX's] catalog already" due to its "simple but thrilling beat", over which Charli XCX "absolutely floats" with an "icy, disaffected cool". Meaghan Garvey of Pitchfork, in a positive review of Brat, opined that "360" was Charli XCX's "best pure pop tune in ages", with Billboard's Kyle Denis referring to it as a "delicious pure-pop opener" and Andrew Unterberger, also for Billboard, calling it "impressively kinetic". For The Daily Beast, Coleman Spilde wrote that "360" was "a lyrical masterclass in hotness" and "an intensive on vanity so hyper-focused that it could be taught at the Learning Annex". For The New York Times, Lindsay Zoladz acclaimed "360" as "wryly funny", "deliriously catchy", and "endlessly quotable". Elle's Natalie Zannikos called "360" "an absolute electro-pop ear-worm" whose instrumental opening had a "sort of inescapable catchiness" comparable to that of a ringtone.

In a review of Brat, Rolling Stone's Brittany Spanos called "360" and "Club Classics", the second track on Brat, a "one-two punch" of "bouncy ragers" that were reminiscent of "classic club hits, the kind that don't do more than tell you to free your mind and keep dancing". Describing it as an "it-girl anthem", Lucas Martins of Beats Per Minute complimented "360" on its "watertight groove", its "undeniably catchy hook", and its lyrics, which, he wrote, "show Charli unafraid to revel in her impact". Dakota West Foss of Sputnikmusic also called its hook "catchy" and "cutesy". For The Independent, Olivia Petter called "360" an "undisputed banger ... that make[s] you want to wriggle and bop into the wee hours". Emily Bootle wrote for i that the song's lyrics "I'm so Julia" and "666 with a princess streak" were among the most memorable on Brat and contained tongue-in-cheek millennial irony. Rod Liddle called "360" a "cute modern pop song" by which he was "taken for a moment" in his review of Brat for The Spectator. In a negative review of Brat for the World Socialist Web Site, Nick Barrickman wrote that "360" and its references to Fox showed Charli XCX to be "as arrogant and selfish as multimillionaire and billionaire celebrities like Beyoncé or Taylor Swift".

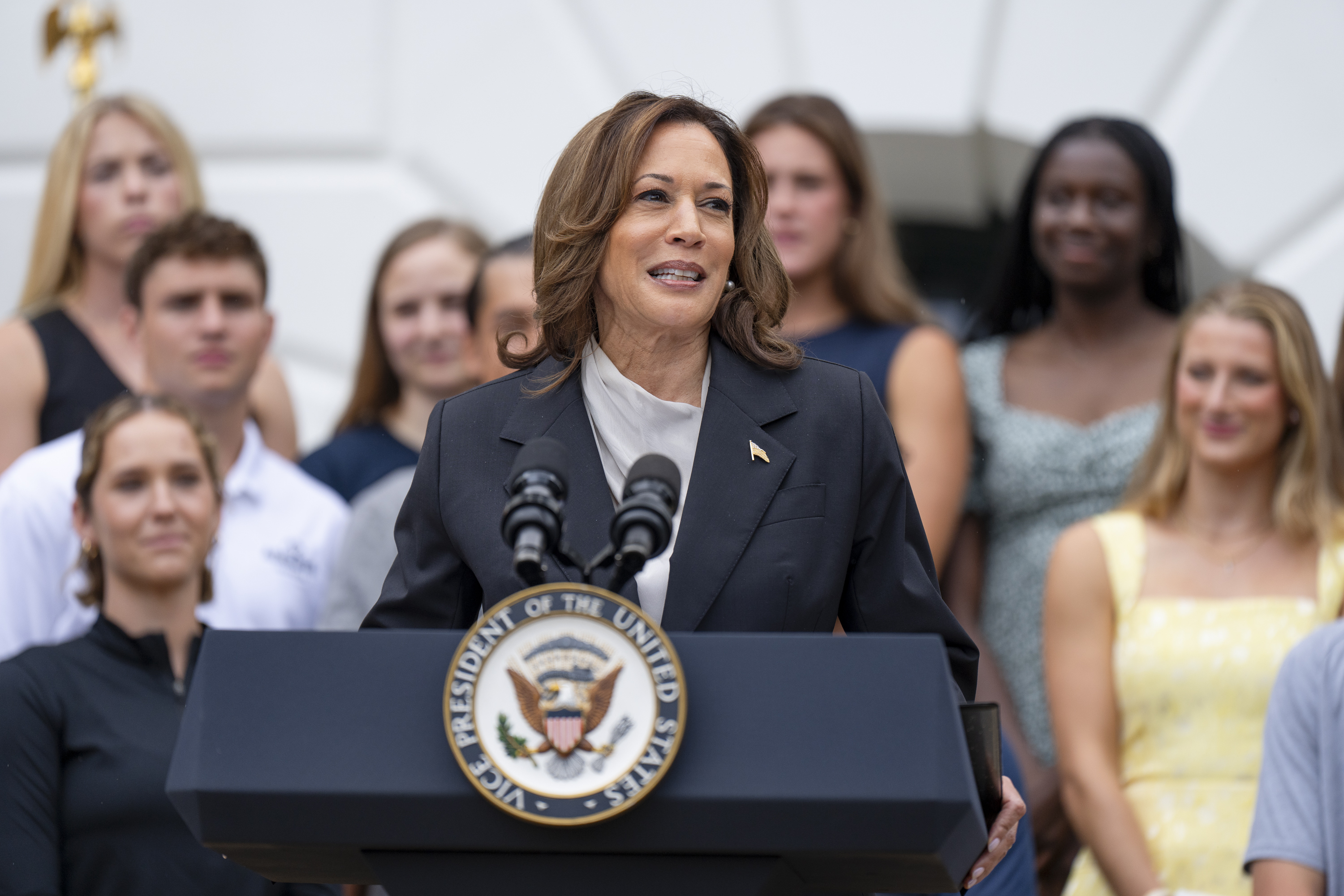
During her 2024 U.S. presidential campaign, Brat-themed memes surrounding Kamala Harris (pictured), including a viral TikTok montage of her set to "360", became popular online.

Following the song's release, "I'm so Julia" became an Internet meme and a popular marketing phrase. "360" was used in a viral TikTok video edit of then–U.S. vice president Kamala Harris, made by George Washington University student Aly McCormick following Harris's presidential campaign announcement in July 2024. It was based around her "You think you just fell out of a coconut tree?" speech and replaced the song's lyric "I'm so Julia" with "I'm so Kamala"; it had more than one and a half million views by late July. A remix of "360" featuring audio from the "coconut tree" speech also went viral on TikTok and gained over one million likes by August 2024. "360" soundtracked a Marc Jacobs advertisement starring Gabbriette, model Alex Consani, and singer Clairo, among others, in August 2024. The American Heart Association praised the song in September 2024 for being the right tempo at which to perform CPR on someone who has collapsed.

Entertainment Weekly named "360" the second-best song of 2024, with Lester Fabian Brathwaite writing for the publication that it "lit the match of Brat summer" and had a "propulsive beat" and "memorable lyrics". Stereogum, Billboard, and Complex also included it on their lists of the best songs of the year. It was nominated for the Grammy Award for Record of the Year at the 67th Annual Grammy Awards.

== Live performances ==
Charli XCX performed "360" on her co-headlining 2024 U.S. tour with Troye Sivan, Sweat. She also performed it on her solo 2024–2025 Brat Tour. She also performed the song as the host and musical guest on Saturday Night Live on 16 November. Fox, whom Charli XCX asked to appear on the episode two weeks prior, introduced Charli XCX for her performance of the song, in which she performed the song wearing a Lou Reed t-shirt in front of a lime green screen. She performed "360" again during a surprise live performance in Times Square later that month. She included the song in the set list of her fifth solo concert tour, the Music, Fashion, Film Tour (2026-2027).

== Commercial performance ==
"360" peaked at number 11 on the UK Singles Chart and on the Irish Singles Chart. As of 2024, "360" is Charli XCX's 12th most commercially successful song on the UK Singles Chart. It debuted at number 73 on the Billboard Hot 100 following Brat's release, becoming the first song from the album to appear on the chart, and peaked at number 41 for the week dated 17 August 2024, the same week that the remix version of Charli XCX's song "Guess" featuring Billie Eilish debuted on the chart. Its American chart success coincided with the announcement of Harris's presidential campaign and Charli XCX tweeting "Kamala IS Brat". It also became her first top-ten entry on Billboard's Pop Airplay chart since 2014, when her song "Boom Clap" topped the chart, and peaked at number two on Billboard's Hot Dance/Electronic Songs chart, where it became her highest peak on the chart as a lead artist in June 2024. It debuted at number 70 on the Canadian Hot 100 for the week dated 22 June 2024. It also peaked at number 24 on the ARIA Charts for the week dated 9 August 2024.

== Music video ==
=== Synopsis ===
The accompanying satirical music video for "360" begins with a nearly two-minute skit. Charli XCX is seen walking down a hall with "Spring Breakers" playing as she gets invited by Gabbriette to Skyferrori's Trattoria, a fictional restaurant referencing the username of Twitter user @skyferrori. Upon entering through the back door, she finds a group of models, actresses, and influencers, including Gabbriette, Julia Fox, Rachel Sennott, Chloe Cherry, Salem Mitchell, and Richie Shazam, all having dinner in order to pick a "new hot Internet girl" to fulfill a prophecy that would prevent their extinction. Charli XCX suggests Fox, to which Sennott replies, "Charli, that's literally Julia Fox," and Charli XCX then picks a waitress, played by Instagram user @randomcontrol, at the restaurant instead. The women start giving instructions to the waitress on how to be a hot internet girl, with Fox and Charli XCX describing it as a "je ne sais quoi situation", Gabbriette, who is hitting a vape, telling her she needs to be "really hot in, like, a scary way", and Shazam saying she has to be "known, but at the same time unknowable", before Charli XCX turns around and begins performing the song.

The music video for "360" ends with (clockwise) Hari Nef, Quenlin Blackwell, Chloë Sevigny, Charli XCX, Peri Rosenzweig, Isamaya Ffrench, Tess McMillan, Gabbriette, and Alex Consani all striking poses in the street.

Between several match cuts, Charli XCX appears in various locations: at a gym, where she pours herself a glass of wine in a white tank top with no bra on while she stands on a vibration plate and is accompanied by Sennott and Fox, who are unenthusiastically lifting weights and taking selfies; in a hospital hallway, where she straddles an old man in a gurney next to Gabbriette and Alex Consani, both of whom are posing smoking cigarettes and posing next to her; in a photo booth next to actress Hari Nef and influencer Blizzy McGuire; and in the street, where influencers Emma Chamberlain and Quenlin Blackwell apathetically observe a car accident they just caused. Make-up artist Isamaya Ffrench also appears in the video. Toward the end, Chloë Sevigny exits a black Porsche 992 convertible and tosses a cigarette into a garbage can, lighting its contents on fire, as she and Charli XCX strut down the street. The video ends with Sevigny, Charli XCX, and several other girls, including Tess McMillan, posing at the end of the street. The video also features appearances from Cook, Anna Collins—the sister of photographer Petra Collins, who photographed Charli XCX's campaign for Skims—Matisse Andrews, Sakura Bready, Peri Rosenzweig, and Niki Takesh. The video's cast also consists of multiple transgender women, including Nef, Consani, and McGuire.

The video's aesthetic was described as "sleek" and comparable to a fashion photoshoot by Léa Zetlaoui of Numéro. Matthew Velasco of W described the video cast as "a Mount Rushmore of reining [sic] internet cool girls". Time's Cady Lang wrote that Charli XCX had "summoned an Avengers-level cadre of 'It girls'" for the video, while Thom Waite of Dazed compared the video to a "parallel-universe production of Euphoria or a 2020s it girl twist on Girls".

=== Filming and production ===
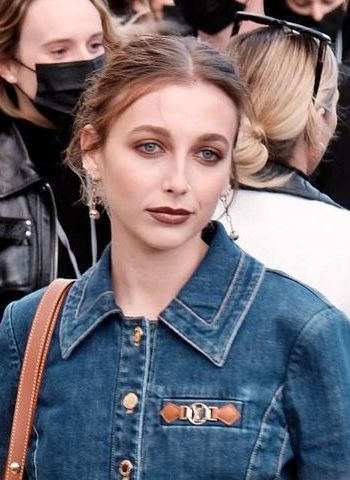
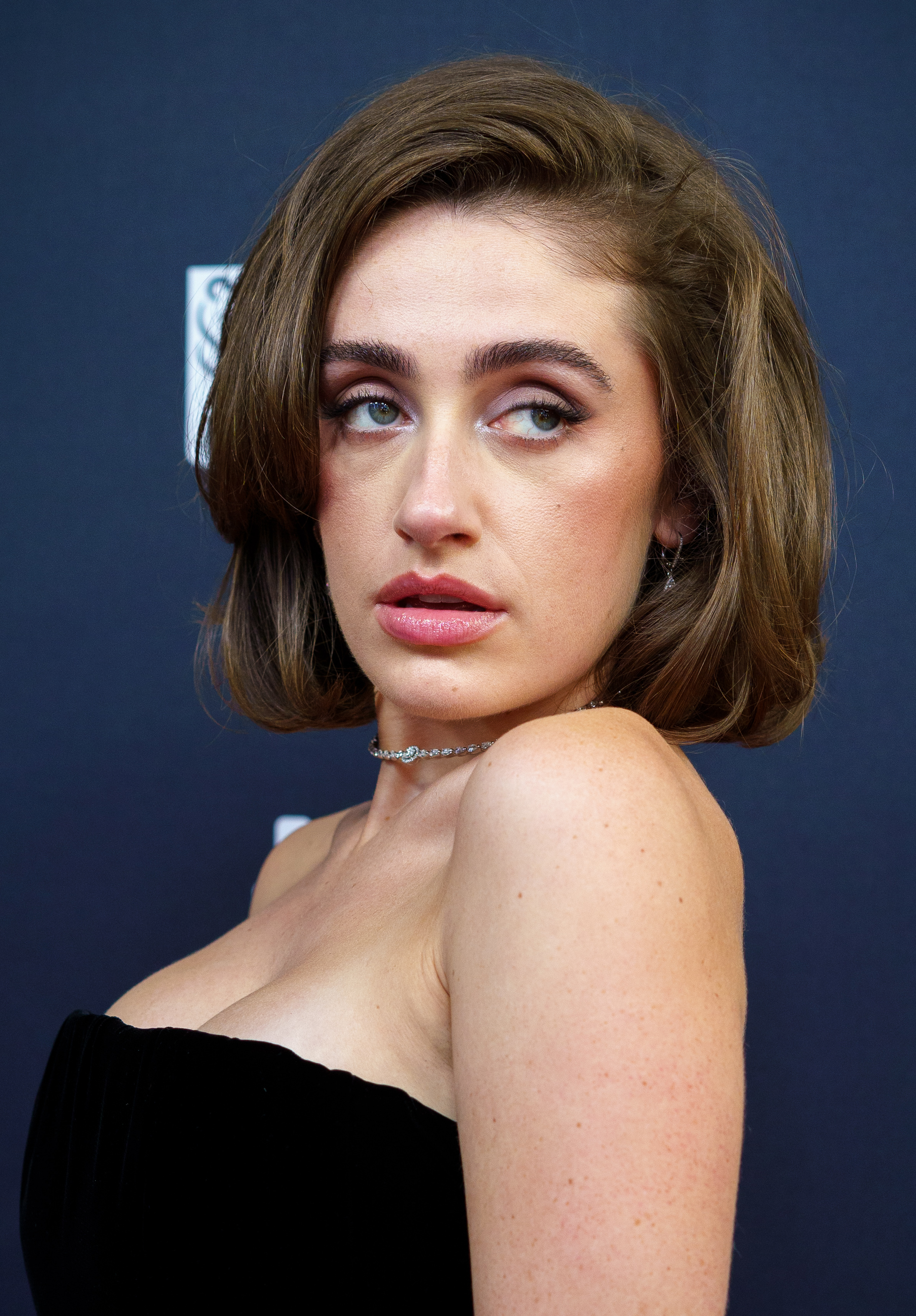
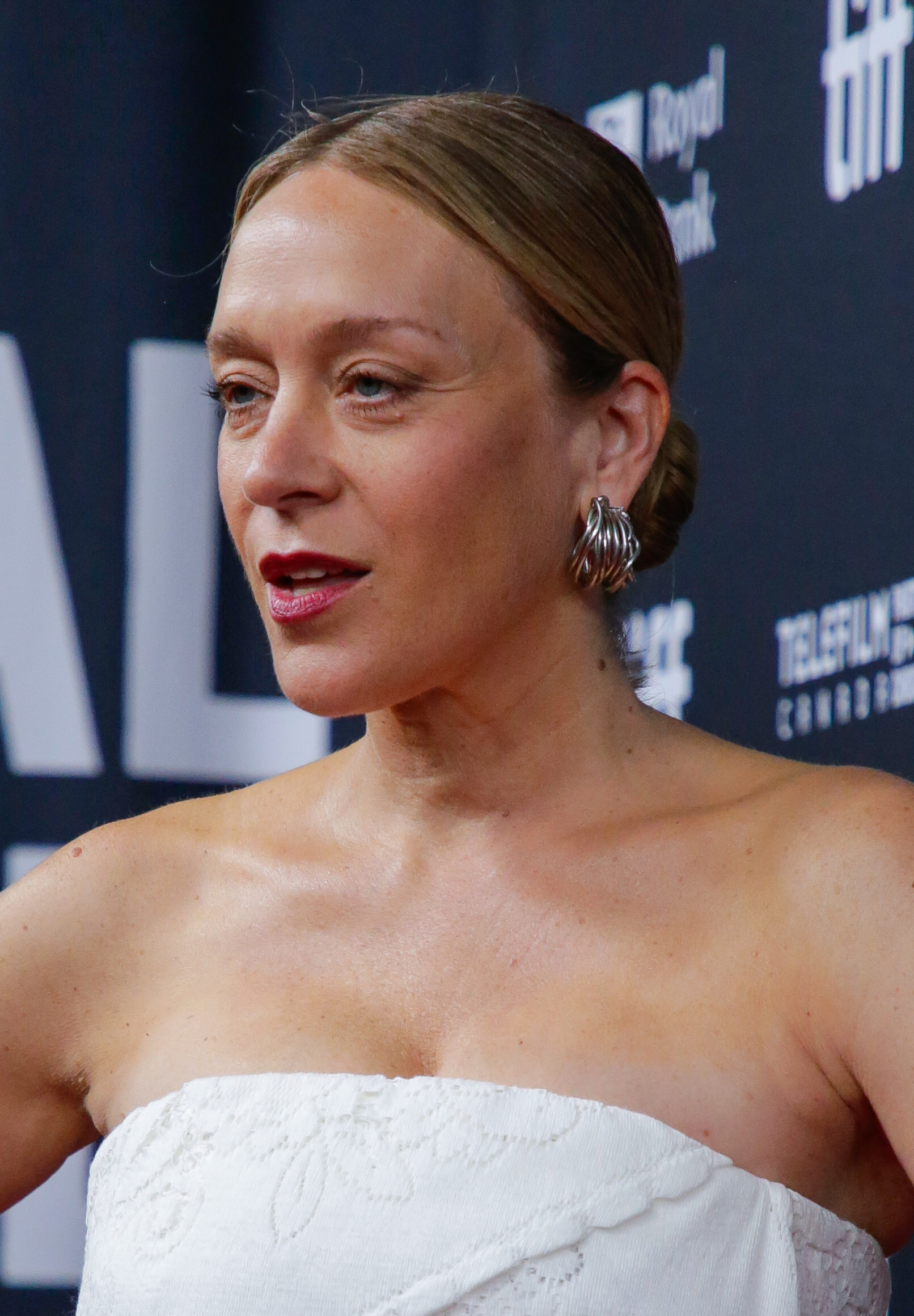
The music video for "360" stars a cast of influencers, actresses, and models, including (from left to right) Emma Chamberlain, Rachel Sennott, and Chloë Sevigny. The cast was picked by Charli XCX based on women she thought "embodied the personality" of the song.

A promotional teaser for the "360" music video was released days prior to its premiere. Charli XCX hosted a screening for the video at Brain Dead Studios in West Hollywood. The music video was written and directed by Aidan Zamiri and filmed from 11 to 12 March 2024. Charli XCX cast women who she "felt embodied the personality of the record" to star in the video and described its concept as a play on their public images, which she stated were occasionally positive but often reduced to "those girls on the Internet who just vape". Sevigny appeared in it in between filming for the Netflix series Monsters: The Lyle and Erik Menendez Story and had not been familiar with Charli XCX until then. After a mutual friend between her and Charli XCX direct messaged her about the song and music video treatment, she agreed to make a cameo when she found out Sennott, who she was "in love with", would be in it. According to Sevigny, she was instructed by Zamiri to "just act really bratty". Styling was done by Chris Horan, Charli XCX's stylist since 2021. He based each of the women's looks in the video, including an Yves Saint Laurent jumpsuit worn by Charli XCX, on elevated, "hot and bitchy" versions of their personal style, which he observed on their Instagram accounts. Brands featured in the video include Dion Lee, Knwls, Courrèges, Eytys, Vacquera, and Marni, the last of which was also worn by Charli XCX at the 2024 Met Gala. Art direction for the video was done by Grace Surnow.

=== Critical reception ===
In an opinion piece on Brat for British Vogue, Mahoro Seward wrote in July 2024 that "everything that has unfolded since the first minute of Aidan Zamiri's masterful music video for '360'"—which he likened to "a vignette of what The Last Supper would have looked like if Jesus and his disciples were modern-day It-girls"—"amounts to a watershed moment in pop cultural history". For Pitchfork's review of Brat, Meaghan Garvey wrote that the video "feels heavy-handed but not unearned". The Observer's Kate Mossman wrote that the video "locates [Charli XCX] at the cutting edge of internet culture" and "is almost designed to make people like me [Mossman] feel old". Olivia Petter of The Independent deemed the music video for "360" the introduction to the "brat identity", which she wrote was "fundamentally a celebration and interrogation of girlhood in all its complexities", and Lindsay Zoladz of The New York Times called it "instantly iconic". Brathwaite deemed the music video "further proof of [the song's] undeniability", while Devon Chodzin of Stereogum wrote that the video "elevates '360' from celebrity braggadocio to a paean to influence". Léa Zetlaoui, writing for Numéro, who named "360" one of the best music videos of 2024, wrote that Charli XCX's "show of self-confidence and individuality" in the video turned her "into a new icon of pop culture". The A.V. Club's Drew Gillis wrote that "360" was "a pretty standard music video" that "does land one coup with the appearance of Chloë Sevigny".

Social media users and critics compared its ensemble cast to that in Taylor Swift's 2015 music video for her song "Bad Blood", with Rhian Daly of NME opining that it "felt so much more cutting-edge and exciting" than "Bad Blood". Marisa Aron, Atlantic's VP of marketing, called "360" "one of the most talked about music videos" of 2024. It was listed as one of the best music videos of 2024 by Creative Review, Billboard Philippines, and HuffPost UK. It won the awards for Video of the Year and Best UK Pop Video at the UK Music Video Awards and was nominated at the Grammy Awards for Best Music Video, at the MTV Europe Music Awards for Best Video, and at the MTV Video Music Awards for Best Art Direction.

== Covers and remixes ==
The indie rock band Blossoms (pictured in 2022) performed a cover of "360" for BBC Radio 1's Live Lounge.

The closing track of Brat, "365", is a remix of "360", which was originally produced by Cook for a DJ set at a nightclub. Nia Archives performed a remix of "360" at Glastonbury Festival 2024. American rapper Aminé released his own remix of "360", titled "360.5" based on the titles of his mixtapes OnePointFive and TwoPointFive and featuring humorous lyrics over the song's original instrumental. It was released in July 2024 with a music video of Aminé on vacation in Ischia. Also that month, British indie rock duo Wet Leg performed a cover of "360" at Truck Festival. For BBC Radio 1, British record producer Tourist performed a piano cover of the song for the station's Piano Sessions series, with elements of the melody from the Artful Dodger song "Movin' Too Fast", in August 2024. On BBC Radio 1's Live Lounge in October 2024, the indie pop band Blossoms performed a jangle pop and new wave cover of "360", which ended with a cover of Stardust's 1998 single "Music Sounds Better with You" performed by Rick Astley. An unofficial mashup of "360" with the Fleetwood Mac song "Dreams" was shared online by both Fleetwood Mac guitarist Lindsey Buckingham and by Charli XCX on her TikTok account. In 2026, composer and cellist Peter Gregson released an instrumental version, arranged for cello and string quartet, as part of the soundtrack for the fourth season of the television show Bridgerton.

=== Robyn and Yung Lean remix ===
"360 featuring Robyn and Yung Lean (Note: The remix was originally titled "The 360 Remix with Robyn and Yung Lean" in sentence-case with the artist's names spelled in lowercase.)"

Promotional single by Charli XCX featuring Robyn and Yung Lean

from the album Brat and It's Completely Different but Also Still Brat
- Released: 31 May 2024
- Length: 2:09
- Label: Atlantic
- Songwriters: Charlotte Aitchison; Robin Carlsson; Jonatan Aron Leandoer Håstad; Alexander Guy Cook; Finn Keane; Blake Slatkin; Henry Walter; Omer Fedi
- Producers: A. G. Cook; Cirkut

Lyric video
- "360 featuring Robyn and Yung Lean" on YouTube

Charli XCX recorded a remix of "360" featuring Swedish singer Robyn and Swedish rapper Yung Lean during her trip to Stockholm. Charli XCX personally asked Robyn to perform on the remix. Robyn said, "I was so happy she did that. We had dinner six months before she released that album and had time to talk about it before it all kind of went crazy." Yung Lean and Charli XCX had been friends prior to releasing the remix. It was released on 31 May 2024, one week before Brat's release. It was the second Brat remix to be released, following a remix of "Von Dutch" featuring Cook and Addison Rae. The "360" remix was included as the opening track of the remix album Brat and It's Completely Different but Also Still Brat. The remix features braggadocios and retrospective lyrics from all three artists about their musical careers.

Callum Foulds of The Line of Best Fit called the remix of "360" "delightfully whimsical" and Karen Gwee of NME called it "a showcase of Swedish excellence". Billboard's Katie Bain ranked it 13th out of the 16 remixes on the album and remarked that it shared the "head-bobbing bubbliness" of the original but turned it "into a breezy, frothy group hang". Paste's Andy Steiner reviewed Robyn's verses positively, writing that her verse was delivered "with the confidence of someone who's met her own Brat moment with aplomb", and Andrew Unterberger similarly praised Robyn singing "I started so young, I didn't even have e-mail/Now my lyrics on your booby" as the remix's best lyric. Stereogum named it the best song of the week of its release, with Danielle Chelosky writing that it "sounds like friends having fun, not at all forced or insincere" and praising Yung Lean's "effortlessly magnetic intonations", Robyn's "charming" verses, and Charli XCX's "monotone rap". Conversely, Sal Cinquemani of Slant Magazine wrote that the remix of "360" "largely wasted" Robyn's contribution to the song and criticised it as "cluttered". Jason P. Frank, for Vulture, picked the original "360" as the better version of the song, adding that Robyn getting less time than Yung Lean was "a little disappointing" considering that "Robyn has been inspiring Charli for years".

== Personnel ==
Credits derived from Apple Music.

- Charli XCX – vocals, songwriting
- A. G. Cook – songwriting, production
- Blake Slatkin – songwriting
- Cirkut – songwriting, production, vocal recording
- Finn Keane – songwriting, additional production
- Idania Valencia – mastering
- Randy Merrill – mastering
- Manny Marroquin – mixing
- Omer Fedi – songwriting

== Charts ==
=== Weekly charts ===
Weekly chart performance for "360"
Chart (2024–2025)	Peak position
Australia (ARIA)	24
Australia Dance (ARIA)	1
Canada Hot 100 (Billboard)	42
Canada CHR/Top 40 (Billboard)	15
Canada Hot AC (Billboard)	23
Global 200 (Billboard)	35
Greece International (IFPI)	74
Ireland (IRMA)	11
Japan Hot Overseas (Billboard Japan)	18
Latvia Airplay (TopHit)	28
Lithuania (AGATA)	86
New Zealand (Recorded Music NZ)	33
Portugal (AFP)	100
Slovakia Airplay (ČNS IFPI)	54
South Korea BGM (Circle)	170
Sweden Heatseeker (Sverigetopplistan)	3
UK Singles (Official Charts)	11
US Billboard Hot 100	41
US Adult Pop Airplay (Billboard)	35
US Hot Dance/Electronic Songs (Billboard)	2
US Hot Dance/Pop Songs (Billboard)	3
US Pop Airplay (Billboard)	7

Chart performance for "360 featuring Robyn and Yung Lean"
Chart (2024)	Peak position
New Zealand Hot Singles (RMNZ)	22

Chart performance for "360 (Arr. for Cello Obligato and String Quartet)"
Chart (2026)	Peak position
New Zealand Hot Singles (RMNZ)	14

=== Monthly charts ===
Monthly chart performance for "360"
Chart (2024)	Peak position
Latvia Airplay (TopHit)	39

=== Year-end charts ===
2024 year-end chart performance for "360"
Chart (2024)	Position
Australia Dance (ARIA)	10
UK Singles (OCC)	100
US Hot Dance/Electronic Songs (Billboard)	6

2025 year-end chart performance for "360"
Chart (2025)	Position
Canada Hot AC (Billboard)	85
US Hot Dance/Pop Songs (Billboard)	10

== Certifications ==
Certifications for "360"
Region	Certification	Certified units/sales
Australia (ARIA)	Platinum	70,000^{‡}
Canada (Music Canada)	2× Platinum	160,000^{‡}
France (SNEP)	Gold	100,000^{‡}
New Zealand (RMNZ)	Platinum	30,000^{‡}
Poland (ZPAV)	Platinum	50,000^{‡}
United Kingdom (BPI)	Platinum	600,000^{‡}
^{‡} Sales+streaming figures based on certification alone.

== Release history ==
Release dates and formats for "360"
Region	Date	Format(s)	Version	Label	Ref.
Various	10 May 2024	Digital download; streaming	Original	Atlantic	
Various	31 May 2024	Digital download; streaming	Robyn and Yung Lean remix	Atlantic	
Various	8 November 2024	7-inch single	Original	Atlantic	

== See also ==
- List of Billboard number-one dance songs of 2024
