= Von Dutch (song) =

2024 single by Charli XCX

Single by Charli XCX

from the album Brat
- A-side: "The Von Dutch Remix with Addison Rae and A. G. Cook" (Note: The remix was originally titled "The Von Dutch Remix with Addison Rae and A. G. Cook" in sentence-case with the artist's names spelled in lowercase. It was later changed to "Von Dutch A. G. Cook Remix featuring Addison Rae" on digital outlets ahead of Brat release, maintaining the initial title's type of stylization.) (double A-side)
- B-side: "??????"
- Released: 29 February 2024
- Genre: EDM; electroclash; electropop; dance-pop
- Length: 2:45
- Label: Atlantic
- Songwriters: Charlotte Aitchison; Finn Keane
- Producer: Finn Keane

Charli XCX singles chronology
"In the City" (2023)	"Von Dutch" (2024)	"360" (2024)

Music video
- "Von Dutch" on YouTube

"Von Dutch" (stylised in sentence case) is a song by British singer Charli XCX. It was released on 29 February 2024 through Atlantic Records. Written by Charli XCX alongside its producer Finn Keane, the track serves as the lead single from her sixth studio album, Brat. The song and its remix version received a Grammy Award nomination for Best Dance Pop Recording and Best Remixed Recording, respectively, winning the former award. "Von Dutch" was also used as the official theme song for WWE's 2025 Royal Rumble wrestling event.

== Background and composition ==
Charli XCX teased the song on her social media pages before making videos on TikTok featuring a 20-second snippet of the chorus. One of these videos featured American singer Addison Rae, whom Charli XCX collaborated with on her 2023 track "2 Die 4".

The song was written by Charli XCX and Finn Keane, who also handled production. Keane had previously produced several tracks from her 2017 mixtapes Number 1 Angel and Pop 2, "Official" from her 2019 album Charli, and "Speed Drive" from the soundtrack to the 2023 film Barbie. It is a throwback to Charli XCX's teenage years, during when she released music on Myspace and "first began thinking her taste was cool". It was written about embracing being an object of gossip or obsession, with the title referring to the cult status of the fashion brand Von Dutch, and features Charli XCX "sing-chanting over a blaring synth-anchored electropop beat". The song was mixed by Tom Norris.

== Critical reception ==
Ahead of its release, The Face's Shaad D'Souza called the single a "perfect introduction to her acidic, freewheeling new mode ... the song plays like bravura tweets fired off after a glass of champagne". Pitchfork gave it the distinction of Best New Track, with Anna Gaca describing it as "made of helium and hydraulics, ... with its heart in the club and its ass on a Harley ... another chapter in the singer-producer's gleeful participatory parody of celebrity culture". Gio Santiago of Resident Advisor gave the track an "RA Recommends" stamp, noting "'Von Dutch' is a true and chaotic return to form ... a supercharged blast of dance pop, club and electroclash". Billboard's Kyle Denis described the song as "delightfully rambunctious". The song won the award for Best Dance Pop Recording at the 67th Annual Grammy Awards in 2025.

== Music video ==
Directed by Torso and filmed at the Charles de Gaulle and Paris–Le Bourget airports in the Paris area, the music video's terminal scene was shot in Hall M of Charles de Gaulle's Terminal 2E, while the cabin and wing scenes were shot on the Boeing 747-100 and Airbus A380, respectively, displayed on the tarmac of the Musée de l'air et de l'espace at Le Bourget. The video is depicted from the point of view of a paparazzo chasing Charli XCX through an airport terminal into the cabin of the 747. She spars with the camera, pushes it down boarding stairs, then climbs up the landing gear onto the wing of the A380. The video ends with Charli XCX deliberately falling off the plane's wing into a baggage cart, then lying on a moving luggage conveyor belt, staring deeply into the camera.

The music video was nominated at the MTV Video Music Awards for Best Cinematography.

== Track listing ==
- Digital download
1. "Von Dutch" – 2:44
- USB
1. "Von Dutch" – 2:44
2. "The Von Dutch Remix with Addison Rae and A. G. Cook" – 2:37
3. "Edit" – 3:40
4. "Voice Note to Addison 20231108" – 1:39
- 7" vinyl

Side A

1. "Von Dutch" – 2:44
2. "The Von Dutch Remix with Addison Rae and A. G. Cook" – 2:37

Side B

1. "??????" – 3:40
- Digital download
1. "Von Dutch Remix with Skream and Benga" (Note: The remix was originally titled "The Von Dutch Remix with Skream and Benga" in sentence-case with the artist's names spelled in lowercase.) – 4:41

== Charts ==
=== Weekly charts ===
Weekly chart performance for "Von Dutch"
Chart (2024)	Peak position
Australia (ARIA)	77
Australia Dance (ARIA)	5
Ireland (IRMA)	34
New Zealand Hot Singles (RMNZ)	6
UK Singles (Official Charts)	26
US Bubbling Under Hot 100 (Billboard)	17
US Hot Dance/Electronic Songs (Billboard)	7

=== Year-end charts ===
Year-end chart performance for "Von Dutch"
Chart (2024)	Position
Australia Dance (ARIA)	46
US Hot Dance/Electronic Songs (Billboard)	15

== Certifications ==
Certifications for "Von Dutch"
Region	Certification	Certified units/sales
Australia (ARIA)	Gold	35,000^{‡}
Canada (Music Canada)	2× Platinum	160,000^{‡}
France (SNEP)	Gold	100,000^{‡}
New Zealand (RMNZ)	Platinum	30,000^{‡}
Poland (ZPAV)	Gold	62,500^{‡}
United Kingdom (BPI)	Platinum	600,000^{‡}
^{‡} Sales+streaming figures based on certification alone.

== Addison Rae and A. G. Cook remix ==
"Von Dutch A. G. Cook Remix featuring Addison Rae"

Promotional single by Charli XCX, Addison Rae and A. G. Cook

from the album Brat and It's Completely Different but Also Still Brat
- A-side: "Von Dutch" (double A-side)
- B-side: "??????"
- Released: 22 March 2024
- Genre: Electropop; hyperpop; EDM
- Length: 2:37
- Label: Atlantic
- Songwriters: Charlotte Aitchison; Addison Rae Easterling; Finn Keane
- Producer: A. G. Cook

Audio video
- "Von Dutch A. G. Cook Remix featuring Addison Rae" on YouTube

On 22 March 2024, XCX released a remix of "Von Dutch", which featured additional vocal contributions from American singer Addison Rae and updated production from English producer and longtime collaborator A. G. Cook. The song was released as the first promotional single from the Brat remix album, Brat and It's Completely Different but Also Still Brat. The remix marked the second time XCX and Rae have collaborated, after the song "2 Die 4", which appeared on Rae's extended play, AR (2023).

Flisadam Pointer of Uproxx described the remix as a "sweat-inducing" "fuzz frenzy of Charli XCX's best electronic and pop sensibilities riddled with nostalgic references". The Line of Best Fit's Tyler Damara Kelly described Cook's production as "idiosyncratic", also adding that the remix preserves the energy of "Von Dutch". It received a nomination for Best Remixed Recording at the 67th Annual Grammy Awards.

=== Live performances ===
XCX and Rae performed the track together during the Sweat tour, at Madison Square Garden, New York City on September 23, 2024. They performed the track together again during XCX's Coachella 2025 weekend two festival set on April 19, 2025. Rae then included the song in the setlist of her debut concert tour, The Addison Tour, in 2025, and XCX joined Rae on stage during the October 22, 2025, show at the Greek Theatre in Los Angeles.

=== Charts ===
Chart performance for "Von Dutch A. G. Cook Remix featuring Addison Rae"
Chart (2024)	Peak position
New Zealand Hot Singles (RMNZ)	25

== Release history ==
Release history for "Von Dutch"
Region	Date	Format	Version	Label	Ref.
Various	29 February 2024	Digital download; streaming	Original	Atlantic	
Italy	1 March 2024	Radio airplay	Original	Warner	
Various	15 March 2024	7-inch vinyl	Original; Addison Rae and A. G. Cook remix	Atlantic	
Various	22 March 2024	USB	Original; Addison Rae and A. G. Cook remix	Atlantic	
Various	22 March 2024	Digital download; streaming	Addison Rae and A. G. Cook remix	Atlantic	
Various	8 April 2024	Digital download; streaming	Skream and Benga remix	Atlantic	
