= List of awards and nominations received by Charli XCX =

Charli XCX awards and nominations
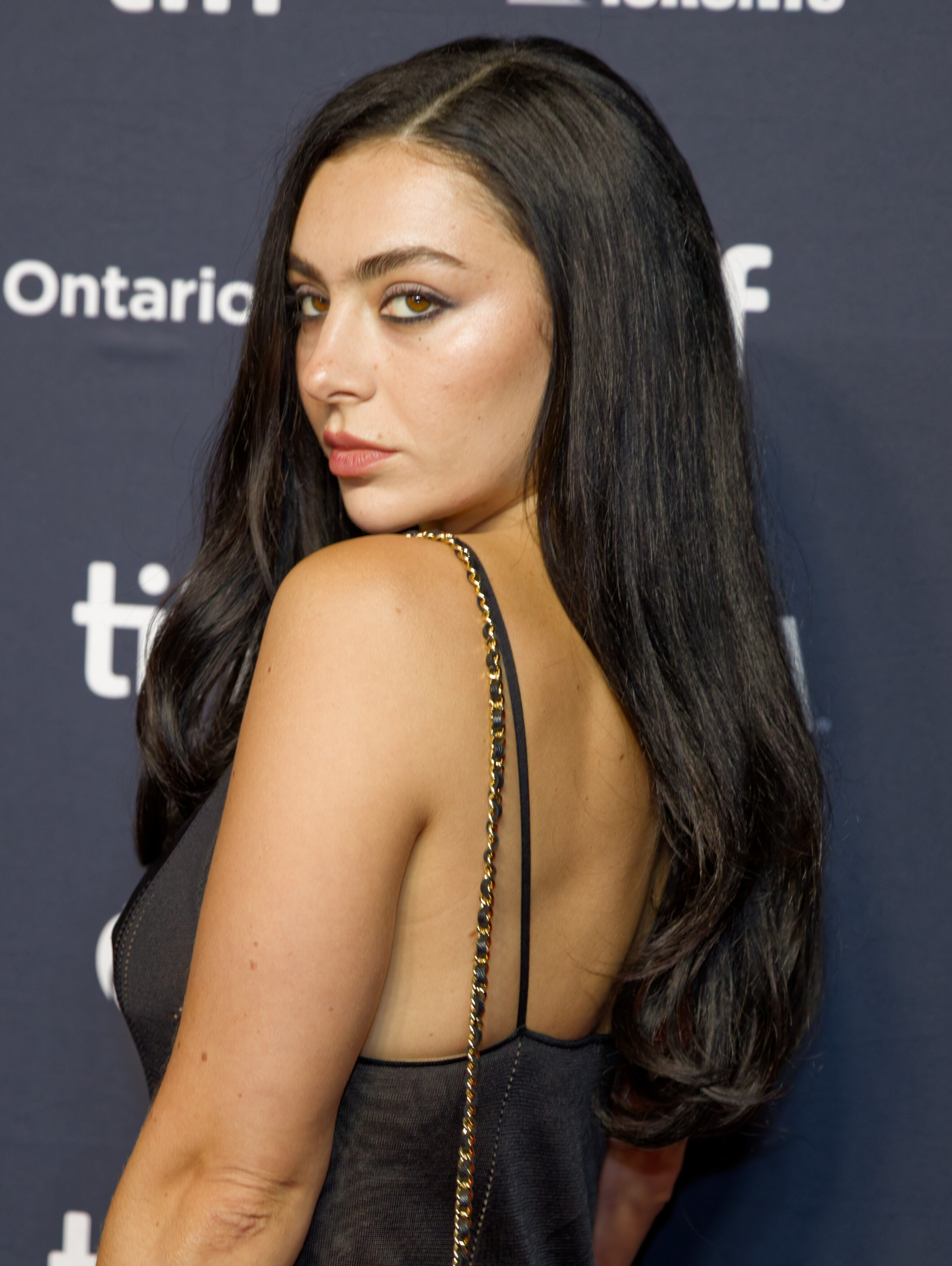
- Charli XCX in 2025
Awards and nominations
Award	Wins	Nominations
Billboard Music Awards	3	6
Brit Awards	5	10
Grammy Awards	3	10
MTV Video Music Awards	1	15
MTV Europe Music Awards	0	9
MTV Italian Music Awards	0	1
NME Award	2	3
Teen Choice Awards	1	5
WDM Radio Awards	0	1
YouTube Music Awards	1	1

Totals (Note: Certain award groups do not simply award one winner. They acknowledge several different recipients, have runners-up, and have third place. Since this is a specific recognition and is different from losing an award, runner-up mentions are considered wins in this award tally. For simplification and to avoid errors, each award in this list has been presumed to have had a prior nomination.)
- Wins: 68
- Nominations: 199

Charli XCX is a British singer, songwriter, and actress who has received numerous accolades throughout her career. Her recognitions include three Grammy Awards, three Billboard Music Awards, five Brit Awards, an MTV Video Music Award and nine MTV Europe Music Award nominations.

She rose to prominence in 2012 with the Icona Pop collaboration "I Love It", the song reached top 10 in United States and Europe and was nominated for Top Dance/Electronic Song at the Billboard Music Awards. In 2014 she achieved commercial success with "Fancy", a collaboration with Australian rapper Iggy Azalea, the song received several awards and nominations worldwide including two nominations for the Grammy Awards as Record of the Year and Best Pop Duo/Group Performance, won the Billboard Music Award for Top Rap Song and got four nominations at the 2014 MTV Video Music Awards, including Video of the Year and Best Pop Video. The same year she released "Boom Clap", a song for the 2014 romance film The Fault in Our Stars, the track became her first solo top-ten single on the Billboard Hot 100, received a nomination for the MTV Video Music Award for Best New Artist and was one of the ten music videos shortlisted for the Brit Award for British Video of the Year, though it was not one of the five nominees. Her breakthrough during the year resulted in nominations for MTV Europe Music Award for Best New Act and Best Push Act.

In 2015, she began working alongside producers from the UK collective PC Music developing a more experimental sound and image and achieving critical success with her subsequent projects. She released several EPs and mixtapes and received two UK Music Video Award nominations for her 2017 single "Boys", alongside multiple wins and nominations at the NME Awards winning Best British Female Artist in 2016 and Best Track for "Boys" in 2018 and receiving nominations for Best Mixtape for Pop 2 and two for Best British Solo Artist in 2017 and 2018.

Her fourth and sixth studio albums How I'm Feeling Now (2020) and Brat (2024) both received critical acclaim and were shortlisted for the Mercury Music Prize for Album of the Year. For the latter, she was the most awarded artist at the 2025 Brit Awards, including Artist of the Year and Album of the Year.

== Awards and nominations ==
Organizations	Year	Work	Category	Result	Ref.
American Music Awards	2014	"Fancy" (with Iggy Azalea)	Single of the Year	Nominated	
American Music Awards	2025	Herself	Favorite Dance/Electronic Artist	Nominated	
American Music Awards	2025	Brat	Best Pop Album	Nominated	
American Music Awards	2025	Brat	Album of the Year	Nominated	
American Music Awards	2026	Wuthering Heights	Favorite Soundtrack	Nominated	
Aotearoa Music Awards	2025	"Girl, So Confusing featuring Lorde" (with Lorde)	Single of the Year	Won	
ARIA Music Awards	2014	"Fancy" (with Iggy Azalea)	Song of the Year	Nominated	
ARIA Music Awards	2024	Brat	Most Popular International Artist	Nominated	
ASCAP Pop Music Awards	2015	"Fancy" (with Iggy Azalea)	Most Performed Songs	Won	
ASCAP Pop Music Awards	2020	"Señorita"	Most Performed Songs	Won	
ASCAP Pop Music Awards	2024	Herself	Global Impact Award	Won	
ASCAP Rhythm & Soul Music Awards	2015	"Fancy" (with Iggy Azalea)	Award-Winning Song	Won	
Attitude Awards	2017	Herself	Best Music Act	Won	
BBC Radio 1 Dance Awards	2025	Brat	Dance Album Project	Won	
BET Hip-Hop Awards	2014	"Fancy" (with Iggy Azalea)	Best Hip-Hop Video	Nominated	
BET Hip-Hop Awards	2014	"Fancy" (with Iggy Azalea)	People's Champ Award	Nominated	
Billboard Music Awards	2014	"I Love It" (with Icona Pop)	Top Dance/Electronic Song	Nominated	
Billboard Music Awards	2015	"Fancy" (with Iggy Azalea)	Top Hot 100 Song	Nominated	
Billboard Music Awards	2015	"Fancy" (with Iggy Azalea)	Top Streaming Song (Audio)	Nominated	
Billboard Music Awards	2015	"Fancy" (with Iggy Azalea)	Top Rap Song	Won	
Billboard Music Awards	2024	Herself	Top Dance/Electronic Artist	Won	
Billboard Music Awards	2024	Brat	Top Dance/Electronic Album	Won	
Billboard Women in Music	2014	Herself	Hitmaker Award	Won	
Billboard Women in Music	2024	Herself	Powerhouse Award	Won	
Billboard.com Mid-Year Awards	2014	"Fancy" (with Iggy Azalea)	Favorite No. 1 Hot 100 Song	Won	
Billboard.com Mid-Year Awards	2014	"Fancy" (with Iggy Azalea)	Best Music Video	Won	
BreakTudo Awards	2022	Herself	Global Artist	Nominated	
BreakTudo Awards	2024	"Apple"	Anthem of the Year	Nominated	
BreakTudo Awards	2025	Herself	International Female Artist	Nominated	
Brit Awards	2015	"Boom Clap"	British Video	Eliminated	
Brit Awards	2020	Herself	British Female Solo Artist	Nominated	
Brit Awards	2023	Herself	British Pop/R&B Act	Nominated	
Brit Awards	2024	Herself	British Pop Act	Nominated	
Brit Awards	2025	Herself	British Pop Act	Nominated	
Brit Awards	2025	Herself	British Dance Act	Won	
Brit Awards	2025	Herself	Artist of the Year	Won	
Brit Awards	2025	Herself	Songwriter of the Year	Won	
Brit Awards	2025	Brat	Album of the Year	Won	
Brit Awards	2025	"Guess" (with Billie Eilish)	Song of the Year	Won	
British LGBT Awards	2021	Herself	Celebrity Ally	Nominated	
CD Shop Awards	2025	Brat	Western Music Award	Won	
Clio Awards	2025	"Charli xcx Brat Wall in Brooklyn"	Out of Home	Gold	
Clio Awards	2025	Brat	Album Launch/Artist Promotion Integrated Campaign	Gold	
Clio Awards	2025	Brat	Album Launch/Artist Promotion Integrated Campaign	Gold	
Clio Awards	2025	Brat	Packaging	Silver	
Clio Awards	2025	Brat	Digital/Mobile	Silver	
Clio Awards	2025	Brat and It's Completely Different but Also Still Brat	Events/Activation	Silver	
Clio Awards	2025	"360"	Music Videos	Silver	
Clio Awards	2025	"360"	Direction	Silver	
Clio Awards	2025	"Von Dutch"	Editing	Silver	
Clio Awards	2025	Herself	Social Good	Silver	
Clio Awards	2025	"Apple"	Viral Post	Silver	
Clio Awards	2025	"Charli xcx Brat & Dress to Impress (Roblox)"	Partnerships, Sponsorships & Collaborations	Bronze	
Clio Awards	2025	"Charli XCX Remix Album Fan Experience Live from Storm King Art Center"	Partnerships, Sponsorships & Collaborations	Bronze	
Clio Awards	2025	"Charli xcx Brat Generator"	Websites	Bronze	
Capricho Awards	2014	"Fancy" (with Iggy Azalea)	Best International Hit	Nominated	
Capricho Awards	2014	"Fancy" (with Iggy Azalea)	Best International Video	Nominated	
City of Hope's 11th Annual Songs of Hope	2016	Herself	Vanguard Award	Won	
Danish Music Awards	2024	Brat	International Album of the Year	Won	
Dork Readers’ Poll	2025	Herself	Most Anticipated Album for 2026	Pending	
Electronic Music Awards	2023	"Out Out" (with Joel Corry, Jax Jones and Saweetie)	Best Use of Sample	Nominated	
Electronic Music Awards	2023	"Hot in It" (with Tiësto)	Remix of the Year	Nominated	
GAFFA Awards (Sweden)	2019	Herself	Best International Solo Artist	Nominated	
GAFFA Awards (Sweden)	2019	"1999" (with Troye Sivan)	Best International Hit	Nominated	
GAFFA Awards (Sweden)	2021	Herself	Best International Solo Artist	Nominated	
GAFFA Awards (Sweden)	2021	How I'm Feeling Now	Best International Album	Nominated	
GQ Awards	2019	Herself	Woman of the Year	Won	
Gay Times Honours 500	2019	Herself	Allyship in Music	Won	
Gotham TV Awards	2025	Overcompensating	Breakthrough Comedy Series	Nominated	
Grammy Awards	2015	"Fancy" (with Iggy Azalea)	Record of the Year	Nominated	
Grammy Awards	2015	"Fancy" (with Iggy Azalea)	Best Pop Duo/Group Performance	Nominated	
Grammy Awards	2025	"360"	Record of the Year	Nominated	
Grammy Awards	2025	"360"	Best Music Video	Nominated	
Grammy Awards	2025	Brat	Album of the Year	Nominated	
Grammy Awards	2025	Brat	Best Dance/Electronic Album	Won	
Grammy Awards	2025	Brat	Best Recording Package	Won	
Grammy Awards	2025	"Apple"	Best Pop Solo Performance	Nominated	
Grammy Awards	2025	"Guess" (with Billie Eilish)	Best Pop Duo/Group Performance	Nominated	
Grammy Awards	2025	"Von Dutch"	Best Dance Pop Recording	Won	
Grammy Awards	2027	Music, Fashion, Film	Best Alternative Music Album	Pending	
Grammy Awards	2027	Wuthering Heights	Best Compilation Soundtrack for Visual Media	Pending	
Grammy Awards	2027	"House" (with John Cale)	Best Song Written for Visual Media	Pending	
Ivor Novello Awards	2023	Herself	Visionary Award	Won	
Ivor Novello Awards	2025	Brat	Best Album	Nominated	
Ivor Novello Awards	2025	Herself	Songwriter of the Year	Won	
Hollywood Music Video Awards	2025	"360"	Best Marketability	Won	
Hungarian Music Awards	2025	Brat	Foreign Electronic Album or Recording of the Year	Nominated	
International Dance Music Awards	2015	"Fancy" (with Iggy Azalea)	Best Rap/Hip-Hop/Trap Dance Track	Nominated	
iHeartRadio Music Awards	2014	"I Love It" (with Icona Pop)	Best Lyrics	Nominated	
iHeartRadio Music Awards	2015	Herself	Renegade	Nominated	
iHeartRadio Music Awards	2015	"Fancy" (with Iggy Azalea)	Song of the Year	Nominated	
iHeartRadio Music Awards	2015	"Fancy" (with Iggy Azalea)	Best Collaboration	Nominated	
iHeartRadio Music Awards	2023	"Hot In It" (with Tiësto)	Dance Song of the Year	Nominated	
iHeartRadio Music Awards	2025	"360"	Dance Song of the Year	Won	
iHeartRadio Music Awards	2025	"Apple" Girl Dance (with Troye Sivan)	Favorite Tour Tradition	Nominated	
iHeartRadio Music Awards	2025	Sweat (with Troye Sivan)	Favorite Tour Style	Nominated	
iHeartRadio Music Awards	2025	Girl So Confusing	Favorite Surprise Guest	Nominated	
iHeartRadio Music Awards	2025	Brat	Dance Album of the Year	Won	
Kids Choice Awards	2015	"Fancy" (with Iggy Azalea)	Favorite Song	Nominated	
Kids Choice Awards	2025	"Apple"	Favorite Viral Song	Nominated	
Mercury Prize	2020	How I'm Feeling Now	Album of the Year	Nominated	
Mercury Prize	2024	Brat	Album of the Year	Nominated	
MTV Europe Music Awards	2014	Herself	Best New Act	Nominated	
MTV Europe Music Awards	2014	Herself	Best Push Act	Nominated	
MTV Europe Music Awards	2015	Herself	Best World Stage Performance	Nominated	
MTV Europe Music Awards	2018	Herself	Best World Stage Performance	Nominated	
MTV Europe Music Awards	2022	"Samsung Superstar Galaxy Concert Charli XCX - Roblox"	Best Metaverse Performance	Nominated	
MTV Europe Music Awards	2024	Herself	Best Pop	Nominated	
MTV Europe Music Awards	2024	Herself	Biggest Fans	Nominated	
MTV Europe Music Awards	2024	Herself	Best UK & Ireland Act	Nominated	
MTV Europe Music Awards	2024	"360"	Best Video	Nominated	
MTV Europe Music Awards	2024	"Guess" (with Billie Eilish)	Best Collaboration	Nominated	
MTV Italian Music Awards	2015	Herself	Best New Artist	Nominated	
MTV Video Music Awards	2014	"Boom Clap"	Best New Artist	Nominated	
MTV Video Music Awards	2014	"Fancy" (with Iggy Azalea)	Video of the Year	Nominated	
MTV Video Music Awards	2014	"Fancy" (with Iggy Azalea)	Best Female Video	Nominated	
MTV Video Music Awards	2014	"Fancy" (with Iggy Azalea)	Best Art Direction	Nominated	
MTV Video Music Awards	2014	"Fancy" (with Iggy Azalea)	Best Pop Video	Nominated	
MTV Video Music Awards	2022	Charli XCX - Roblox	Best Metaverse Performance	Nominated	
MTV Video Music Awards	2024	"360"	Best Art Direction	Nominated	
MTV Video Music Awards	2024	"Von Dutch"	Best Cinematography	Nominated	
MTV Video Music Awards	2024	"Guess" (with Billie Eilish)	Song of Summer	Nominated	
MTV Video Music Awards	2024	"Apple"	Best Trending Video	Nominated	
MTV Video Music Awards	2025	"Guess" (with Billie Eilish)	Video For Good	Won	
MTV Video Music Awards	2025	"Guess" (with Billie Eilish)	Best Direction	Nominated	
MTV Video Music Awards	2025	"Guess" (with Billie Eilish)	Best Art Direction	Nominated	
MTV Video Music Awards	2025	"Guess" (with Billie Eilish)	Best Editing	Nominated	
MTV Video Music Awards	2025	Herself	Best Pop	Nominated	
MTV Video Music Awards	2026	"SS26"	Best Pop Video	Nominated	
MTV Video Music Awards	2026	"SS26"	Best Art Direction	Nominated	
MTV Video Music Awards	2026	Music, Fashion, Film	Best Long Form Video	Nominated	
MTV Video Music Awards	2026	"Camera"	Song of Summer	Nominated	
mtvU Woodie Awards	2012	Herself	Breaking Woodie	Nominated	
mtvU Woodie Awards	2015	Herself	Woodie of the Year	Nominated	
mtvU Woodie Awards	2015	"Shake It Off"	Cover Woodie	Nominated	
Much Music Video Awards	2014	"Fancy" (with Iggy Azalea)	International Video of the Year – Artist	Nominated	
Music Producers Guild Awards	2025	Brat	Album of the Year	Nominated	
Music Week Awards	2023	Herself	Artist Marketing Campaign	Nominated	
Music Week Awards	2025	Herself	Artist Marketing Campaign	Won	
Music Week Awards	2025	Herself	PR Campaign	Won	
Music Week Awards	2025	Charli XCX x H&M x Warner Music	Music & Brand Partnership	Nominated	
Musikförläggarnas Pris	2015	"Boom Clap"	Best Song	Nominated	
m-v-f- Awards	2024	"Guess" (with Billie Eilish)	Best Music Video	Nominated	
NME Awards	2015	"Fancy" (with Iggy Azalea)	Dancefloor Filler	Won	
NME Awards	2016	Herself	Best British Female Artist	Won	
NME Awards	2017	Herself	Best British Solo Artist	Nominated	
NME Awards	2017	"After the Afterparty"	Best Track	Nominated	
NME Awards	2018	"Boys"	Best Track	Won	
NME Awards	2018	"Boys"	Best Video	Nominated	
NME Awards	2018	Herself	Best British Solo Artist	Nominated	
NME Awards	2018	Pop 2	Best Mixtape	Nominated	
NME Awards	2020	Herself	Best British Solo Act	Nominated	
NME Awards	2020	Herself	Best Solo Act in the World	Nominated	
NME Awards	2020	"Gone" (feat. Christine and the Queens)	Best Collaboration	Nominated	
NME Awards	2022	"Good Ones"	Best Song In The World	Nominated	
NME Awards	2022	"Good Ones"	Best Song By A UK Artist	Nominated	
NewNowNext Awards	2014	Herself	Best New Musician	Nominated	
P3 Guld Music Awards	2013	"I Love It" (with Icona Pop)	Best Song	Won	
P3 Guld Music Awards	2025	"360" (with Robyn and Yung Lean)	Best Song Quote	Nominated	
People's Choice Awards	2015	Herself	Favorite Breakout Artist	Nominated	
Pollstar Concert Industry Awards	2025	Sweat (with Troye Sivan)	Pop Tour of the Year	Nominated	
Pollstar Concert Industry Awards	2025	Herself	New Headliner of the Year	Nominated	
Popjustice £20 Music Prize	2014	"Boom Clap"	Best British Pop Single	Nominated	
Popjustice £20 Music Prize	2017	"Boys"	Best British Pop Single	Nominated	
Popjustice £20 Music Prize	2019	"Blame It on Your Love" (with Lizzo)	Best British Pop Single	Nominated	
Popjustice £20 Music Prize	2020	"forever"	Best British Pop Single	Nominated	
Popjustice £20 Music Prize	2022	"Good Ones"	Best British Pop Single	Nominated	
Popjustice £20 Music Prize	2024	"The girl, so confusing version with Lorde"	Best British Pop Single	Won	
Queerty Awards	2014	"Fancy" (with Iggy Azalea)	Earworm of the Year	Nominated	
Queerty Awards	2020	"Gone" (with Christine and the Queens)	Anthem	Nominated	
Queerty Awards	2025	"Talk Talk" (with Troye Sivan)	Anthem	Nominated	
Project U'S You've Done Quite Well Awards	2017	Herself	Music Person of the Year	Nominated	
Project U'S You've Done Quite Well Awards	2017	"Boys"	International Song of the Year	Nominated	
Project U'S You've Done Quite Well Awards	2017	"Boys"	Best Music Video	Nominated	
Radio Disney Music Awards	2015	Herself	Best New Artist	Won	
Rober Awards Music Prize	2011	Herself	Most Promising New Artist	Nominated	
Rober Awards Music Prize	2017	"Boys"	Best Music Video	Nominated	
Rober Awards Music Prize	2017	Herself	Best Pop Artist	Nominated	
Rober Awards Music Prize	2017	"3AM (Pull Up)" (with MØ)	Floorfiller of the Year	Nominated	
Rober Awards Music Prize	2018	"Out of My Head" (with Tove Lo & Alma)	Floorfiller of the Year	Nominated	
Rober Awards Music Prize	2019	"Gone" (with Christine and the Queens)	Floorfiller of the Year	Nominated	
Rober Awards Music Prize	2020	Herself	Best Electronic Artist	Nominated	
Rolling Stone UK Awards	2024	Herself	The Artist Award	Nominated	
Rolling Stone UK Awards	2024	Brat	The Album Award	Nominated	
Rolling Stone UK Awards	2024	"Guess" (with Billie Eilish)	The Song of the Year Award	Nominated	
SESAC Pop Awards	2014	"I Love It" (with Icona Pop)	Songwriter of the Year	Won	
SESAC Pop Awards	2014	"I Love It" (with Icona Pop)	Song of the Year	Won	
SESAC Pop Awards	2017	"Same Old Love"	Song of the Year	Won	
SESAC Pop Awards	2017	Herself	Songwriter of the Year	Won	
South Bank Sky Arts Awards	2025	Brat	Popular Music	Nominated	
Teen Choice Awards	2013	"I Love It" (with Icona Pop)	Choice Single: Group	Nominated	
Teen Choice Awards	2014	"Boom Clap"	Choice Love Song	Nominated	
Teen Choice Awards	2014	"Fancy" (with Iggy Azalea)	Choice R&B/Hip-Hop Song	Won	
Teen Choice Awards	2014	"Fancy" (with Iggy Azalea)	Choice Summer Song	Nominated	
Teen Choice Awards	2014	"Fancy" (with Iggy Azalea)	Choice Single: Female	Nominated	
The Daily Californian Art Awards	2020	"Ringtone (remix)" (with 100 gecs)	Song of the Year	Runner-up	
UK Music Video Awards	2014	"Fancy" (with Iggy Azalea)	Best Styling	Nominated	
UK Music Video Awards	2016	"Hand in the Fire" (feat. Mr. Oizo)	Best Animation	Nominated	
UK Music Video Awards	2017	"Boys"	Best Pop Video - UK	Nominated	
UK Music Video Awards	2017	"Boys"	Vevo Must See Award	Nominated	
UK Music Video Awards	2024	"360"	Video of the Year	Won	
UK Music Video Awards	2024	"360"	Best Pop Video - UK	Won	
UK Music Video Awards	2024	"360"	Best Styling in a Video	Nominated	
UK Music Video Awards	2024	"360"	Best Colour Grading in a Video	Nominated	
UK Music Video Awards	2024	"Von Dutch"	Best Pop Video - UK	Nominated	
UK Music Video Awards	2024	"Von Dutch"	Best Editing in a Video	Nominated	
UK Music Video Awards	2024	"Guess" (with Billie Eilish)	Best Dance/Electronic Video - UK	Nominated	
UK Music Video Awards	2024	"Guess" (with Billie Eilish)	Best Production Design in a Video	Nominated	
UK Music Video Awards	2025	"Party 4 U"	Best Pop Video – UK	Nominated	
UK Music Video Awards	2026	"Camera"	Best Pop Video – UK	Pending	
UK Music Video Awards	2026	"Camera"	Best Performance in a Video	Pending	
UK Music Video Awards	2026	"Wink Wink"	Best Pop Video – UK	Pending	
UK Music Video Awards	2026	"Wink Wink"	Best Colour Grading in a Video	Pending	
UK Music Video Awards	2026	"Residue" (with A. G. Cook)	Best Dance/Electronic Video – UK	Pending	
UK Music Video Awards	2026	"Rock Music"	Best Rock Video – UK	Pending	
UK Music Video Awards	2026	"SS26"	Best Styling in a Video	Pending	
UK Music Video Awards	2026	"House" (with John Cale)	Best Cinematography in a Video	Pending	
UK Music Video Awards	2026	"House" (with John Cale)	Best Editing in a Video	Pending	
Variety Hitmakers Awards	2020	Herself	Innovator of the Year	Won	
Variety Hitmakers Awards	2024	Herself	Hitmaker of the Year	Won	
Video Prisma Awards	2024	"Von Dutch"	Best Video International	Won	
Video Prisma Awards	2024	"Von Dutch"	Best Cinematography International	Nominated	
Video Prisma Awards	2024	"Von Dutch"	Best Production Design International	Nominated	
WDM Radio Awards	2018	"Dirty Sexy Money" (with David Guetta, Afrojack and French Montana)	Best Trending Track	Nominated	
WSJ. Innovator Awards	2024	Herself	Music Innovator	Won	
Webby Awards	2025	"Von Dutch"	Video & Film: Best Music Video	Nominated	
Webby Awards	2025	The BRAT Interview - Apple Music	Video & Film: Interview or Talk Show	Nominated	
World Music Awards	2014	"Fancy" (with Iggy Azalea)	World's Best Song	Nominated	
World Music Awards	2014	"Fancy" (with Iggy Azalea)	World's Best Video	Nominated	
YouTube Music Awards	2015	Herself	50 Artists to Watch	Won	
Žebřík Music Awards	2014	Herself	Best International Discovery	Nominated	
