= Music, Fashion, Film Tour =

2026-2027 concert tour by Charli XCX

- Tour by Charli XCX
- Location: Europe; North America; South America
- Associated album: Music, Fashion, Film
- Start date: 11 September 2026
- End date: 24 February 2027
- Legs: 2
- No. of shows: 19
- Supporting acts: Underscores; Audrey Hobert
- Producer: Live Nation
- Website: https://www.charlixcx.com/tour

Charli XCX concert chronology
- Brat Tour (2024-2025); Music, Fashion, Film Tour (2026-2027)

The Music, Fashion, Film Tour is the ongoing fifth concert tour by British singer Charli XCX, in support of her eighth studio album, Music, Fashion, Film (2026). The tour began on 11 September 2026 in Philadelphia, Pennsylvania, and is scheduled to conclude on 24 February 2027, in Paris, France. Underscores will perform as the opening act during the North American leg, while Audrey Hobert will serve as the opening act during the European leg.

== Background ==
On 8 June 2026, Charli XCX announced the first dates of the North American leg of the tour. Tickets went on sale four days later, with presales available through Live Nation hours before the general sale. On 13 June 2026, she confirmed dates in her native United Kingdom, which are yet to be revealed.

A portion of the tickets were sold for US$25, dubbed "Angel Tickets", with seat locations assigned at random. Additionally, 50% of the profits from tickets in the first five rows of each venue will be donated to the Transgender Law Center.

On 11 September 2026, the European leg of the tour was announced, with Audrey Hobert confirmed as its opening act.

Charli was announced as a headliner for the Brazilian, Chilean and Argentine editions of Lollapalooza, as well as Colombia’s Estéreo Picnic festival, on October 8.

== Setlist ==
This setlist is from the formal opening night of the tour on September 11, 2026 in Philadelphia. It may not represent the entire show.

1. "Rock Music"
2. "Yeah"
3. "Apple"
4. "Wink Wink"
5. "Persona"
6. "Card Declined"
7. "I'm Afraid"
8. "Track 10"
9. "Girl, So Confusing (remix)"
10. "Pink Diamond"
11. "House"
12. Surprise Song #1
13. "Dying for You"
14. "Club Classics"
15. "365 (remix)"
16. "360"
17. "Sympathy Is a Knife"
18. "Von Dutch"
19. Surprise Song #2
20. "Guess (remix)"
21. "If You Take Away the Music Then What Has She Got?"
22. "2007"
23. "Camera"
24. "Party 4 U"
25. "Vroom Vroom"
26. "Playboy Bunny"
27. "Magic Metal Montana"
28. "SS26"
29. "No One Lasts Forever"

=== Surprise songs ===
- 11 September 2026 - Philadelphia: "Stay Away" and "Do It" with Underscores
- 14 September 2026 - New York City: "Next Level Charli" and "Unlock It" with Kim Petras
- 15 September 2026 - New York City: "Next Level Charli" and "Roll with Me"
- 21 September 2026 - Toronto: "Grins"
- 24 September 2026 - Boston: "Silver Cross"
- 28 September 2026 - Washington: "Next Level Charli"
- 6 October 2026 - Atlanta: "Anthems"
- 14 October 2026 - San Diego: "Silver Cross"
- 17 October 2026 - Inglewood: "Boom Clap" with Chappell Roan and "Stateside" with PinkPantheress
- 18 October 2026 - Inglewood: "Constant Repeat" and "Nicole Kidman" with Adéla
- 23 October 2026 - Paradise: "Everything is Romantic" and "Do It" with Underscores

== Dates ==
List of 2026 concerts
| Date (2026) | City | Country | Venue | Opening act |
|---|---|---|---|---|
| 11 September | Philadelphia | United States | Xfinity Mobile Arena | Underscores |
| 14 September | New York City (Note: Labelled as Brooklyn in promotional material.) | United States | Barclays Center | Underscores |
| 15 September | New York City | United States | Barclays Center | Underscores |
| 21 September | Toronto | Canada | Scotiabank Arena | Underscores |
| 24 September | Boston | United States | TD Garden | Underscores |
| 28 September | Washington, D.C. | United States | Capital One Arena | Underscores |
| 6 October | Atlanta | United States | State Farm Arena | Underscores |
| 14 October | San Diego | United States | Viejas Arena | Underscores |
| 17 October | Inglewood (Note: Labelled as Los Angeles in promotional material.) | United States | Kia Forum | Underscores |
| 18 October | Inglewood | United States | Kia Forum | Underscores |
| 23 October | Paradise (Note: Labelled as Las Vegas in promotional material.) | United States | MGM Grand Garden Arena | Underscores |

List of 2027 concerts
| Date (2027) | City | Country | Venue | Opening act |
|---|---|---|---|---|
| 13 February | Dublin | Ireland | 3Arena | Audrey Hobert |
| 15 February | Glasgow | Scotland | OVO Hydro | Audrey Hobert |
| 17 February | Manchester | England | Co-op Live | Audrey Hobert |
| 19 February | London | England | The O_{2} Arena | Audrey Hobert |
| 20 February | London | England | The O_{2} Arena | Audrey Hobert |
| 22 February | Amsterdam | Netherlands | Ziggo Dome | Audrey Hobert |
| 24 February | Paris | France | Accor Arena | Audrey Hobert |
| 12-14 March (Note: Part of Lollapalooza. Charli's headlining dates will be confirmed later.) | Santiago | Chile | Parque O’Higgins | —N/a |
| 12-14 March | Buenos Aires | Argentina | Hippodromo de San Isidro | —N/a |
| 19-20 March (Note: Part of Festival Estéreo Picnic. Charli's headlining date will be confirmed later.) | Bogotá | Colombia | Parque Simón Bolívar | —N/a |
| 21 March (Note: Part of Lollapalooza Brazil.) | São Paulo | Brazil | Autódromo de Interlagos | —N/a |

== Cancelled Shows ==
List of cancelled shows
| Date (2026) | City | Country | Venue | Reason |
|---|---|---|---|---|
| 21 October | Glendale | United States | Desert Diamond Arena | Illness and Voice loss |
