= No One Lasts Forever =

Song by Charli XCX featuring David Cronenberg

from the album Music, Fashion, Film
- Released: 24 July 2026
- Genre: Synth-pop; hyperpop; spoken word
- Length: 5:42; 3:06 (vinyl version)
- Label: Atlantic
- Songwriters: Charlotte Aitchison; Alexander Guy Cook; Finn Keane
- Producers: Charli XCX; A. G. Cook; Finn Keane

"No One Lasts Forever" is a song by British singer and songwriter Charli XCX featuring Canadian film director David Cronenberg, marking the only collaboration on the album. It was released on 24 July 2026, under exclusive license to Atlantic Records, as the final track from her seventh studio album, Music, Fashion, Film. At 5 minutes and 42 seconds in length, it is Charli XCX's longest studio recording to date.

== Background ==
Cronenberg's collaboration comes from an hour-long conversation he and Charli XCX had in 2025. "I went to Toronto to sit down with him, and record him", she said in an interview with Triple J, "We chose the parts that felt most related to the song, but the entire conversation itself is so interesting".

== Composition and lyrics ==
The first half of the song consists of Charli XCX struggling with her identity and expectations put upon her after achieving huge success with her last album Brat and its remix album Brat and It's Completely Different but Also Still Brat (2024), while the second half is a spoken word monologue by Cronenberg talking about the legacy of art, specifically the legacy of his films. Cronenberg also speaks heavily about death, with his wife Carolyn Zeifman dying in 2017, and a near death experience. The last minute of the track consists of the line, "They are dead, they are gone, no one lasts forever", on a loop, with his vocals eventually overlaying on each other, creating an echo effect in the background.

== Promotion ==
Charli XCX teased an "unexpected collaboration" on the album, with her saying "I’d bet money on you not guessing". On 7 July 2026, this unexpected collaboration was revealed to be Cronenberg.

== Critical reception ==
Writing for GQ, Jack King called the song "haunted" and said, "There have already been plenty of attempts to close the door on Brat, but perhaps this is finally the moment that she is able to let go". Anna Gaca of Pitchfork said the song was "a crazy memento mori", with an outro that "echoes morbidly through the overflow of [the song]". Paolo Ragusa, writing for Consequence of Sound, called the song "a meditation on mortality" and said "It’s the album’s central trick rendered as pure sound: two versions of the same statement, neither one quite lining up, both true at once. 'Oblivion is freedom', Cronenberg says, and Charli doesn’t argue with him or comfort us out of it. She just lets the two tracks drift". Grace Somerville, reviewing for Paste, said the song was "the glitchiest, most hyperpop song on her Schrödinger’s rock record".

Ellise Shafer of Variety heavily praised Cronenberg's monologue on the track, saying that it "Gets to the heart of what the album is really about" and that "Beyond just his art, it’s his life experience that makes him credible to speak these words and they bring all of us back down to earth". John Wohlmacher, writing for Beats Per Minute, said the song "presents itself as this bubbly, sapphire synth-pop tune with existentialist chorus, and it’s all fun and games until it suddenly enters this final spiral, which is a recording of a conversation between Cronenberg and Charli". Wohlmacher personally complimented Cronenberg's voice saying "I love how raspy and withered his voice is here, while Charli’s is boosted into this inaudible, distorted hum that’s totally depersonalised".

== Live performances ==
Charli XCX performed "No One Lasts Forever" as the opening song of her four-track set for BBC Music at Maida Vale Studios, released on 5 August 2026. She also included the song in the set list of her fifth solo concert tour, the Music, Fashion, Film Tour (2026-2027).
