= Camera (Charli XCX song) =

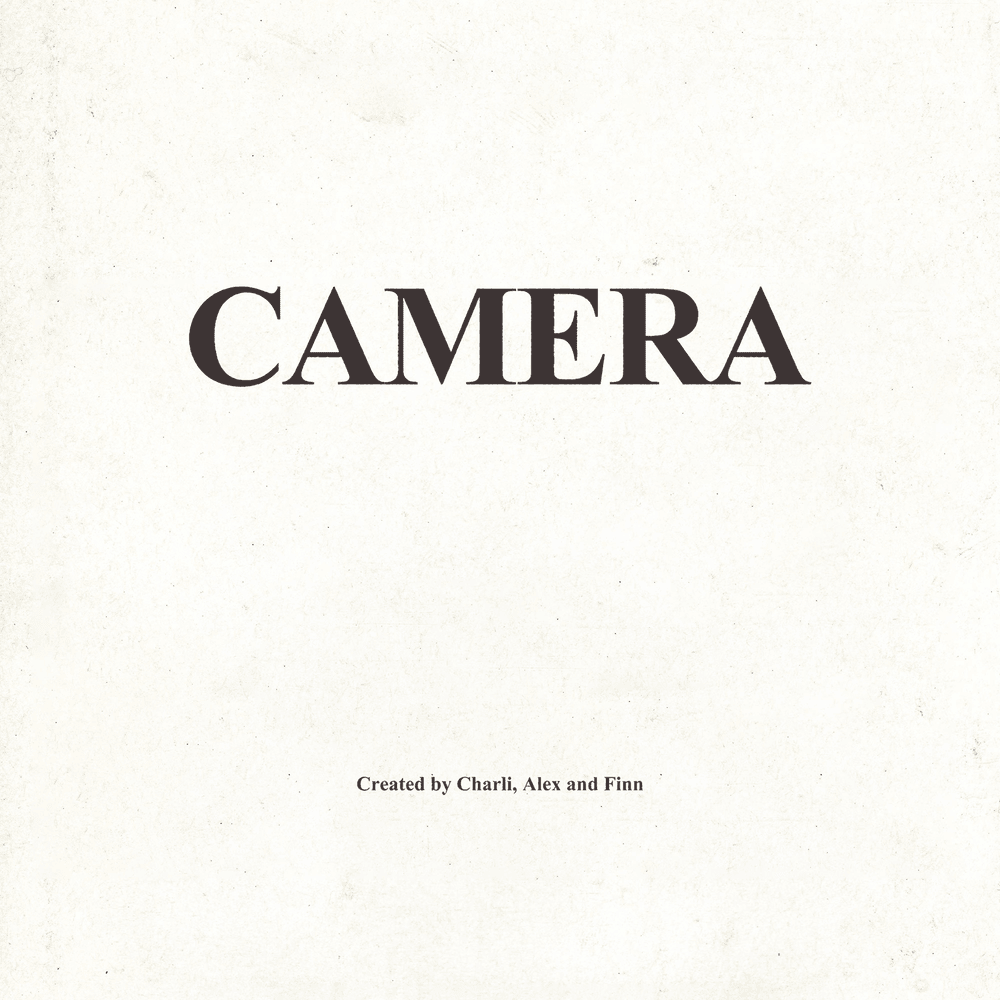

Single by Charli XCX

from the album Music, Fashion, Film
- B-side: "If You Take Away the Music Then What Has She Got"
- Released: 21 July 2026
- Genre: Electronic
- Length: 2:31
- Label: Atlantic
- Songwriters: Charlotte Aitchison; Finn Keane
- Producers: A. G. Cook; Finn Keane

Charli XCX singles chronology
| "Wink Wink" (2026) | "Camera" (2026) | "Danceteria Afterhours" (2026) |

Music video
- "Camera" on YouTube

"Camera" is a song by British singer and songwriter Charli XCX. It was released on 21 July 2026, under exclusive license to Atlantic Records, as the fourth and final single from her eighth studio album, Music, Fashion, Film. Written by Charli and Finn Keane as well as produced by Keane and A. G. Cook, the song explores Charli XCX's relationship with acting and filmmaking as part of the album's overarching concept. It was accompanied by a black-and-white, one take music video directed by Aidan Zamiri and starring French actor Vincent Cassel.

== Background and promotion ==
Charli xcx previewed "Camera" during intimate performances in New York City and London ahead of its release. Following "Rock Music", "SS26", and "Wink Wink", it was released on 21 July 2026, as the fourth single from her eighth studio album, Music, Fashion, Film. The B-side track "If You Take Away the Music Then What Has She Got" was released simultaneously with "Camera".

== Composition ==
"Camera" was written by Charli XCX and Finn Keane. The track was produced and mixed by A. G. Cook and Keane, with Charli XCX, Cook, and Keane serving as executive producers. Charli XCX provided the lead vocals, while Ruairi O'Flaherty mastered the recording.

An electronic track that has elements of rock, "Camera" features glitching guitar synths. Natalie Michie of W and Tiarna of Dazed viewed "Camera" as the chapter representing the "film" aspect of Music, Fashion, Film, with the former interpreting its lyrics as an exploration of performance, artistic identity, and Charli XCX's uncertainty over pursuing acting alongside music.

== Music video ==
A black-and-white music video directed by Aidan Zamiri and featuring French actor Vincent Cassel was released simultaneously with "Camera". Presented as a one take, it stars Cassel as an actor repeatedly attempting to film a climactic desert shootout while technical failures interrupt each attempt. Charli XCX makes several appearances as the film's director, accompanying the camera on a moving dolly throughout the shoot.

== Personnel ==
Credits were adapted from Tidal.

- Charli XCX – lead vocals, executive producer, songwriter
- A. G. Cook – producer, executive producer, mixing
- Finn Keane – producer, executive producer, songwriter, mixing
- Ruairi O'Flaherty – mastering

== Charts ==
=== Weekly charts ===
Weekly chart performance
| Chart (2026) | Peak position |
|---|---|
| Australia (ARIA) | 72 |
| Canada Hot 100 (Billboard) | 67 |
| Estonia Airplay (TopHit) | 65 |
| Global 200 (Billboard) | 112 |
| Ireland (IRMA) | 41 |
| Japan Hot Overseas (Billboard Japan) | 13 |
| Netherlands (Single Tip) | 29 |
| New Zealand Hot Singles (RMNZ) | 4 |
| UK Singles (Official Charts) | 21 |
| US Billboard Hot 100 | 75 |
| US Hot Rock & Alternative Songs (Billboard) | 19 |

=== Monthly charts ===
Monthly chart performance
| Chart (2026) | Peak position |
|---|---|
| Estonia Airplay (TopHit) | 73 |

== Release history ==
Release dates and formats
| Region | Date | Format | Label | Ref. |
|---|---|---|---|---|
| Various | 21 July 2026 | Digital download; streaming | Atlantic | |
| Italy | 31 July 2026 | Radio airplay | Warner | |
| Various | 7 August 2026 | 7-inch single | Atlantic | |
