= Sympathy Is a Knife =

2024 song by Charli XCX

Song by Charli XCX

from the album Brat
- Released: 7 June 2024
- Studio: Sleeper Sounds (London)
- Genre: Synth-pop
- Length: 2:31
- Label: Atlantic
- Songwriters: Charlotte Aitchison; Finn Keane; Jonathan Christopher Shave
- Producers: Charli XCX; Finn Keane

Lyric video
- "Sympathy Is a Knife" on YouTube

"Sympathy Is a Knife" (stylized in sentence case) is a song by the British singer Charli XCX from her sixth studio album, Brat (2024), released through Atlantic Records. She wrote and produced it with Finn Keane, while Jon Shave provided additional songwriting. A synth-pop track driven by synthesisers and vocoded vocals, it was written about self-comparison, paranoia, insecurities, and suicidal ideation.

Upon its release, fans speculated that the track was written about Taylor Swift and her relationship with Matty Healy of the 1975. This speculation was amplified by Swift reissuing her album The Tortured Poets Department (2024) in the United Kingdom a week after Brat's release, blocking it from reaching number one on the UK Albums Chart. Following this, the audience at Charli XCX's DJ set in São Paulo chanted "Taylor is dead!", which she condemned. She also later debunked the speculation of the track's subject, expressing that the track was written about anxiety, insecurities, and situational self-doubt, and Swift later praised Charli XCX in an interview with Vulture.

A remix version featuring Ariana Grande was released on 11 October 2024, from the remix album Brat and It's Completely Different but Also Still Brat. As opposed to the original version, the remix deals with the pitfalls of being in the public eye. The remix, as well as the original version, received positive reviews from critics. Many publications believed the remix was one of the album's best, and the original version was included in Consequence's list of the best songs of 2024. Both versions charted in various countries; the original received a gold certification from Music Canada (MC). Charli XCX included the song in the setlists of her Sweat tour with Troye Sivan and solo Brat Tour throughout 2024 and 2025, and performed it on Saturday Night Live in November 2024.

== Background ==
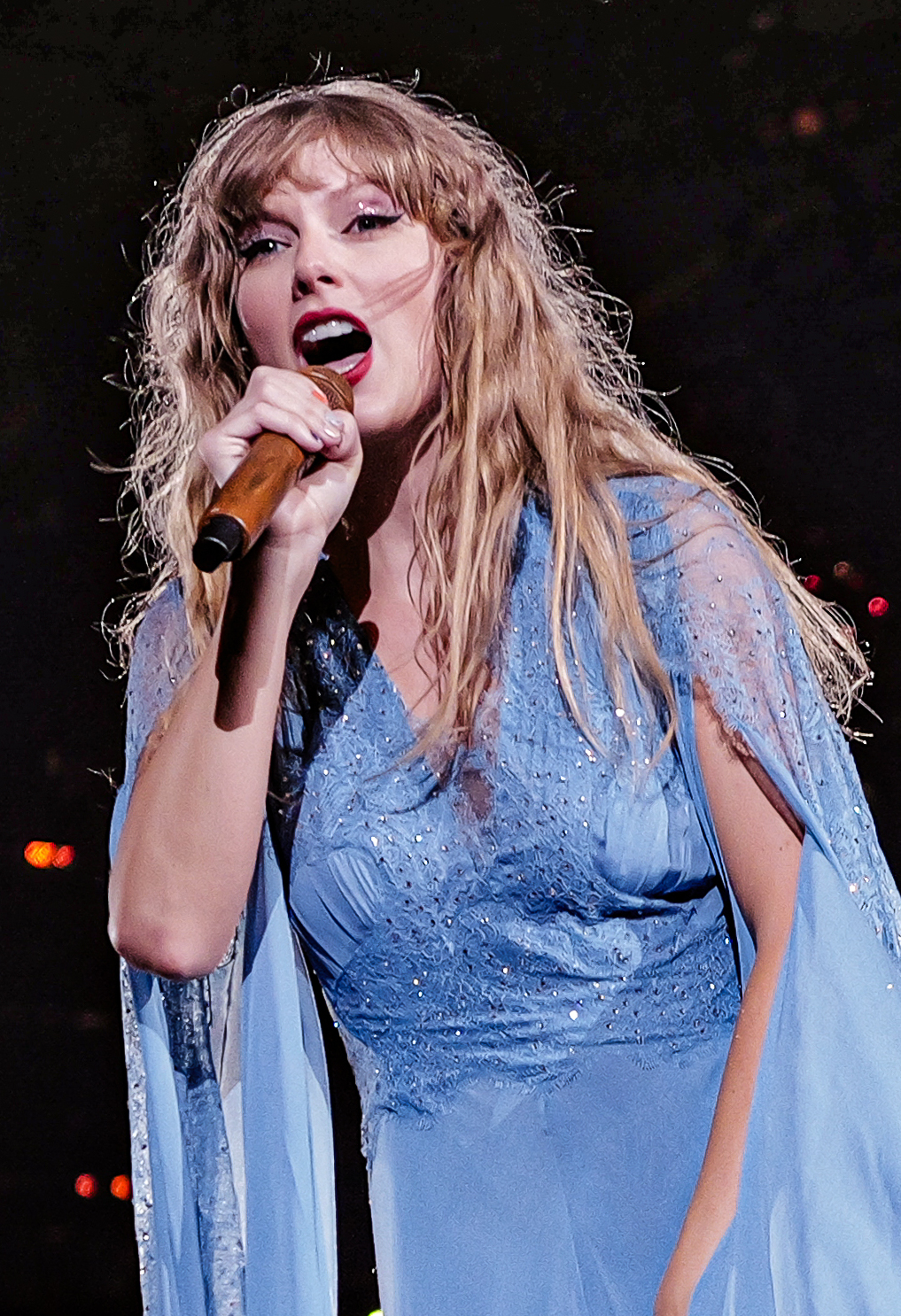
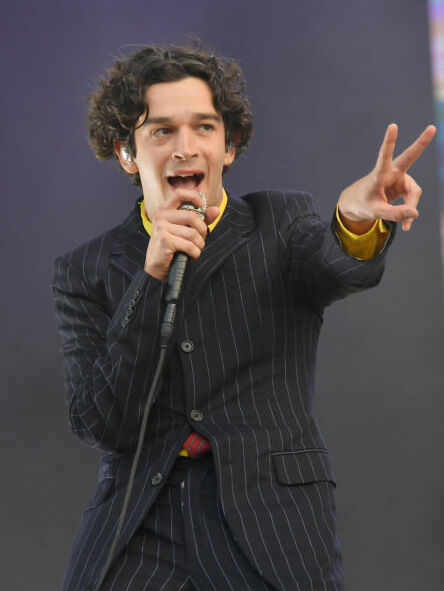
"Sympathy Is a Knife" was speculated by fans to be about the relationship between Taylor Swift (left) and Matty Healy (right).

Upon the release of Charli XCX's sixth studio album, Brat, fans speculated that "Sympathy Is a Knife" was written about the American singer-songwriter Taylor Swift and her ex-boyfriend, Matty Healy of the 1975. The two women had previously performed together, with Charli XCX appearing on the 1989 World Tour in 2015 and as an opening act for the 2018 Reputation Stadium Tour. Though there had been no public feud between Charli XCX and Swift prior to the song's release, fans thought that the mention of Charli XCX's then-fiancé George Daniel, also of the 1975, meant it was written about Swift's relationship with Healy. Despite the speculation, Charli XCX confirmed that there were no "diss tracks" on Brat, and denied that it was written about Swift. The week following Brat's release, Swift released a reissue of her album The Tortured Poets Department (2024), only available in the United Kingdom, which fans thought was an intentional effort to block Brat from reaching number one on the UK Albums Chart.

During a DJ set Charli XCX was playing at in São Paulo during June 2024, the audience chanted "A Taylor morreu!" (Portuguese for 'Taylor is dead!'). She later criticised the people who chanted the phrase on her Instagram story, by asking her fans to stop, and saying that she "will not tolerate it". In an August 2024 interview with Vulture, she expressed that "people are gonna think what they want to think" and stated that "Sympathy Is a Knife" is about her anxiety, insecurities, and wanting to avoid situations that make her feel self-doubt. In the same interview, Swift lauded Charli XCX's musical sensibilities, called her writing "surreal and inventive, always", and that she enjoys seeing the results of Charli XCX's hard work. She further praised Charli XCX's ability to "[take] a song to places you wouldn't expect it to go" and the fact that "she's been doing it consistently for over a decade".

The track "Actually Romantic" from Swift's 2025 studio album The Life of a Showgirl was perceived by fans as a response to "Sympathy Is a Knife". Characterized as a diss track targeting Charli XCX, critics generally criticized the song's narrative as unmerited and the sound ineffective.

== Recording ==
"Sympathy Is a Knife" was recorded at Sleeper Sounds in London. It was written and produced by Charli XCX and Finn Keane, while Jon Shave provided additional songwriting. Idania Valencia and Randy Merrill mastered the track at Sterling Sound in Edgewater, New Jersey, while Tom Norris handled the track's mixing. Keane and Shave engineered Charli XCX's vocals.

== Release and live performances ==
"Sympathy Is a Knife" is the third track on Brat, which was released by Atlantic Records on 7 June 2024. It was released alongside a lyric video. Charli XCX included the track in her set list of the Sweat tour with Troye Sivan throughout 2024 and 2025. She performed "Sympathy Is a Knife" alongside "360" on Saturday Night Live in November 2024. She included the song in the set lists of her solo concert tours, the Brat Tour (2024-2025) and the Music, Fashion, Film Tour (2026-2027).

== Music and lyrics ==
"Sympathy Is a Knife" is 2 minutes and 31 seconds long. It was classified as a synth-pop track by publications. Its energetic production is dominated by synthesisers and hand claps. Charli XCX's vocals are vocoded, and the stuttering beat is paired alongside distorted bass and drum machines. The track features a "raw" sound, one that was compared to the work of Camila Cabello by PopMatters's Nick Malone. For Dork, Abigail Firth called the synthesisers "jolting" and described the track as a "heavier, more arresting" version of Charli XCX's 2019 song "Gone". Meaghan Garvey from Pitchfork said that the "buzzsaw synths and modulated banshee howls sound most like the Charli we've known". The Skinny writer Rho Chung believed that the track marks the beginning of the album's twist. Ryan Bulbeck, writing for Renowned for Sound, said the track has "deeper lyrics that dive into Charli's fears and concerns", and believed the track is "one of many on [Brat] to meld club bangers with reflective and at times incredibly personal lyricism". According to Jake Viswanath of Bustle, it was seen as a representation of one of the central themes of its parent album, as it deals with the singer's "complicated emotions about other women".

The lyrics of "Sympathy Is a Knife" reference paranoia and comparing herself to somebody else. It is an introspective track that comments on Charli XCX's insecurities and suicidal ideation. It also reflects on her conflicted feelings and having a "voice in her head telling her she's not enough". The lyric "Don't wanna see her backstage at my boyfriend's show / fingers crossed behind my back / I hope they break up quick" was interpreted as being about Swift and Healy's relationship. Though, Charli XCX praises the song's character, singing, "'Cause I couldn't even be her if I tried / I'm opposite, I'm on the other side". Dakota West Foss from Sputnikmusic believed that the song's character "suspiciously matches Taylor Swift's description". Paste's Eric Bennett thought that the song's lyrics are darker compared to other songs from the album.

== Reception ==
Upon its release, "Sympathy Is a Knife" was received positively by critics. Chung called the track a "shockingly honest banger". For The A.V. Club, staff writer and news editor Drew Gillis said that the "meat" of Brat is within Charli XCX's "own insecurity", and used lyrics from "Sympathy Is a Knife" as an example. Malone praised the album's engineering, saying, "Who wouldn't want their music to sound this juicy?", and gave the song's "dense and decadent" synth lines as an example. Bennett compared the track to the fellow album track "Girl, So Confusing", but said it "hits much harder". Brittany Spanos from Rolling Stone called it "the first of several tracks that see her baring some of her most conflicted emotions over beats that never lose their energy". Writing for Under the Radar, Austin Saalman thought it was a standout from Brat. Consequence ranked the track 53rd in their list of the best songs of 2024. The track ranked 35th in a year-end readers poll published by Pitchfork.

"Sympathy Is a Knife" peaked at number 56 on the UK singles chart, charting for two weeks. It peaked at number 10 on the Billboard Hot Dance/Electronic Songs chart. On the Billboard auxiliary Dance/Electronic Songs chart, it peaked at number seven. The track additionally peaked at number 18 in New Zealand and number 21 in Australia. It received a platinum certification from Music Canada for sales of 80,000 units.

== Charts ==
Chart performance for "Sympathy Is a Knife"
| Chart (2024) | Peak position |
|---|---|
| Australia (ARIA) | 21 |
| New Zealand (Recorded Music NZ) | 18 |
| Spain (PROMUSICAE) | 81 |
| UK Singles (OCC) | 56 |
| US Hot Dance/Electronic Songs (Billboard) | 10 |

== Certifications ==
| Region | Certification | Certified units/sales |
|---|---|---|
| Canada (Music Canada) | Platinum | 80,000^{‡} |
| New Zealand (RMNZ) | Gold | 15,000^{‡} |
^{‡} Sales+streaming figures based on certification alone.

== Ariana Grande remix ==
"Sympathy Is a Knife featuring Ariana Grande"

Remix by Charli XCX featuring Ariana Grande

from the album Brat and It's Completely Different but Also Still Brat
- Released: 11 October 2024
- Length: 2:34
- Label: Atlantic
- Songwriters: Charlotte Aitchison; Ariana Grande; Finn Keane; Jonathan Christopher Shave
- Producers: Charli XCX; Finn Keane

Audio video
- "Sympathy Is a Knife featuring Ariana Grande" on YouTube

Charli XCX announced the remix album of Brat, titled Brat and It's Completely Different but Also Still Brat, on 12 September 2024. On 6 October, she revealed a sample of the lyrics from the "Sympathy Is a Knife" remix on her social media, alongside a link to pre-order the album. Ariana Grande shared the same lyrics to her Instagram story, hinting at a collaboration. In an interview with Zane Lowe for Apple Music 1, Charli XCX opened up about her relationship with Grande and how the rollout of Brat changed her as a person. The remix with Grande in particular made her realise that one is "only really knowledgeable about [one's] own position", a feeling she thought was more known by Grande than herself. Brat and It's Completely Different but Also Still Brat was released through Atlantic Records on 11 October 2024, with the "Sympathy Is a Knife" remix serving as its third track. The day before the album's release, Charli XCX performed the remix version at Storm King Art Center for a listening party.

=== Composition and lyrics ===
As opposed to the original version of "Sympathy Is a Knife", the remix with Grande deals with being in the public eye and takes in the themes of public perception and scrutiny from the public, press, and faux friends. Carson Mlnarik of Nylon described the remix as "more confident, albeit exasperated, perspective" than the original. Over a "synth-y, glitchier, and handclap-driven" instrumental, the artists exchange verses about rumours and how they refuse to address them, a stance that was compared to Grande's "Yes, And?", released earlier in 2024. Critics specifically found the line "It's a knife when you're so pretty they think it must be fake / It's a knife when they dissect your body on the front page" to be reminiscent of the track. The track contains sharp synthesisers and chopped-up vocals. On the song, the two trade lines about the betrayals they experienced in the music industry. In its final 30 seconds, its sounds become distorted, like a "radio signal drawing listeners into the dilemma by creating a sense of discord", according to Bain. Phares said it showcases Charli XCX and Grande "finding solidarity in dealing with impossible demands and beauty standards". NME's Aneesa Ahmed said it reflects "the influence of post-Brat mega-fame".

=== Critical reception ===
The remix version with Grande received positive critical reviews. AllMusic's Heather Phares said that Grande's appearance "feels perfectly natural". Rob Sheffield, writing for Rolling Stone, believed that Grande "fits right into" the track. P. Claire Dodson, for Teen Vogue, said the track is "an appropriate remix for Grande to jump on". In a ranking of the songs from Brat and It's Completely Different but Also Still Brat, Solomon Pace-McCarrick from Dazed ranked the track second. He named it a standout from the remix album and considered it "the first true anthem from Brat autumn". DIY's Lisa Wright also ranked it second, writing, "it's the one that feels the most hot off the presses", and said it is "underscored by a fellow star who's been through that wringer many times over". For Billboard, Katie Bain considered it the third best track on the remix album. She called it the album's most anticipated song and praised its harmonies. Maria Sherman of the Associated Press considered it the fourth best. Andy Steiner of Paste believed that it leans too much into the "'fame is prison'-type narrative", and criticised Grande's use of "unspecific language and kiss offs". Despite this, she praised its production, writing that "the piercing synths and chopped-up vocals give it a necessary anxious edge".

=== Commercial performance ===
The remix version peaked at number seven on the UK Singles Chart and charted for 12 weeks. It charted for two weeks on the Billboard Hot 100, debuting at number 36. Charting for 29 weeks, it peaked at number two on the Hot Dance/Electronic Songs chart. On the auxiliary Dance/Electronic Streaming Songs chart, it peaked at number one, and peaked at number two on the Dance/Electronic Digital Song Sales chart. In the Canadian Hot 100, the track charted for two weeks, peaking at number 38.

=== Charts ===
==== Weekly charts ====
Weekly chart performance for "Sympathy Is a Knife featuring Ariana Grande"
| Chart (2024) | Peak position |
|---|---|
| Austria (Ö3 Austria Top 40) | 49 |
| Canada (Canadian Hot 100) | 37 |
| France (SNEP) | 173 |
| Germany (GfK) | 70 |
| Global 200 (Billboard) | 20 |
| Greece International (IFPI) | 34 |
| Ireland (IRMA) | 7 |
| Lithuania Airplay (TopHit) | 21 |
| Netherlands (Single Top 100) | 95 |
| New Zealand Hot Singles (RMNZ) | 1 |
| Portugal (AFP) | 41 |
| Sweden (Sverigetopplistan) | 61 |
| Switzerland (Schweizer Hitparade) | 91 |
| UK Singles (OCC) | 7 |
| US Billboard Hot 100 | 36 |
| US Hot Dance/Electronic Songs (Billboard) | 2 |
| US Hot Dance/Pop Songs (Billboard) | 6 |

==== Monthly charts ====
Monthly chart performance for "Sympathy Is a Knife featuring Ariana Grande"
| Chart (2024) | Peak Position |
|---|---|
| Lithuania Airplay (TopHit) | 78 |

==== Year-end charts ====
Year-end chart performance for "Sympathy Is a Knife featuring Ariana Grande"
| Chart (2024) | Position |
|---|---|
| US Hot Dance/Electronic Songs (Billboard) | 28 |

=== Certifications ===
| Region | Certification | Certified units/sales |
|---|---|---|
| United Kingdom (BPI) | Gold | 400,000^{‡} |
^{‡} Sales+streaming figures based on certification alone.

== Personnel ==
=== Original version ===
Credits are adapted from the liner notes of Brat.

- Charli XCX – songwriting, production, vocals
- Finn Keane – songwriting, production, vocal engineering
- Jon Shave – songwriting, vocal engineering
- Tom Norris – mixing
- Idania Valencia – mastering
- Randy Merrill – mastering

=== Remix version ===
Credits are adapted from Tidal.

- Charli XCX – songwriting, production, executive producer, vocals
- Ariana Grande – songwriting, featured vocals
- Finn Keane – songwriting, production, remixing, vocal engineer
- Jon Shave – songwriting, vocal engineering
- Tom Norris – mixing
- Idania Valencia – mastering
