= Music, Fashion, Film =

- Standard edition cover

Studio album by Charli XCX
- Released: 24 July 2026
- Studio: Rue Boyer (Paris)
- Genres: Pop; electronic rock
- Length: 30:05
- Label: Atlantic
- Producers: A. G. Cook; Finn Keane

Charli XCX chronology
Wuthering Heights (2026)	Music, Fashion, Film (2026)

Singles from Music, Fashion, Film
- 1. "Rock Music" Released: 8 May 2026; 2. "SS26" Released: 21 May 2026; 3. "Wink Wink" Released: 26 June 2026; 4. "Camera" Released: 21 July 2026

Music, Fashion, Film is the eighth studio album by the British singer-songwriter Charli XCX, released on 24 July 2026 and distributed through Atlantic Records. A pop album, it features production by her longtime collaborators A. G. Cook and Finn Keane, who both co-wrote the album with Charli XCX.

The album was preceded by the release of four singles, all of which have accompanying music videos; the lead single "Rock Music", followed by "SS26", "Wink Wink" and "Camera". A film of the same name accompanies the album, which includes visuals for all 11 songs, as well as behind-the-scenes footage of the album's creation.

Upon release, Music, Fashion, Film received acclaim from music critics, who praised its lyrical honesty and experimental production. It topped the charts in Australia, Belgium (Flanders), Hungary, New Zealand, Scotland, and the United Kingdom, while reaching the top ten in multiple countries including Austria, Germany, Ireland, Finland, the Netherlands, Sweden, Switzerland, and the United States. To further promote the album, Charli XCX embarked on the eponymous fifth concert tour from September 2026 to February 2027. The album received a nomination for Best Alternative Music Album at the 69th Annual Grammy Awards.

== Background and development ==
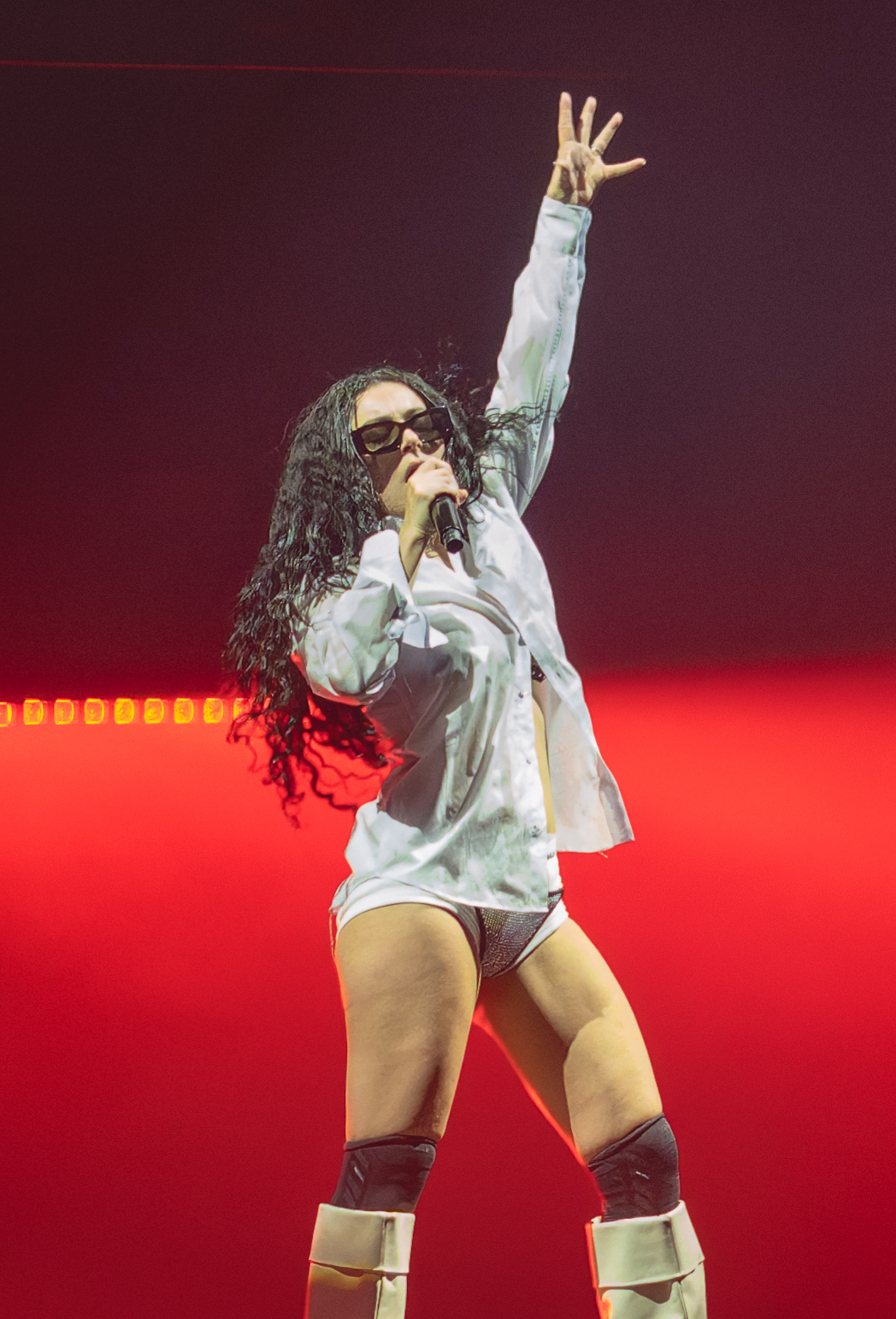
Charli XCX performing during her Brat Tour in November 2024

After receiving universal critical acclaim for her sixth studio album Brat (2024), Charli XCX saw her project spawning a viral Internet trend for its lime-green cover art and aesthetic dubbed as Brat Summer. Continuing this cultural phenomenon, she co-headlined the Sweat tour with Australian singer Troye Sivan and released her first remixed album, Brat and It's Completely Different but Also Still Brat, on 11 October 2024 which featured various artists.

Charli XCX soon struggled with exhaustion and a lack of creative inspiration that made her feel like she "wouldn't be able to make music anymore". She was then asked by director Emerald Fennell, in December 2024, to record a song for her 2026 film adaptation of Wuthering Heights (1847). Charli XCX "immediately felt inspired" after reading the screenplay and worked on several tracks throughout 2025, with frequent collaborator Finn Keane. Described as a "world that felt undeniably raw, wild, sexual, gothic, [and] British," she noted this "collection of songs is an album" and wondered if it fit into her discography, but ultimately decided that it did not matter.

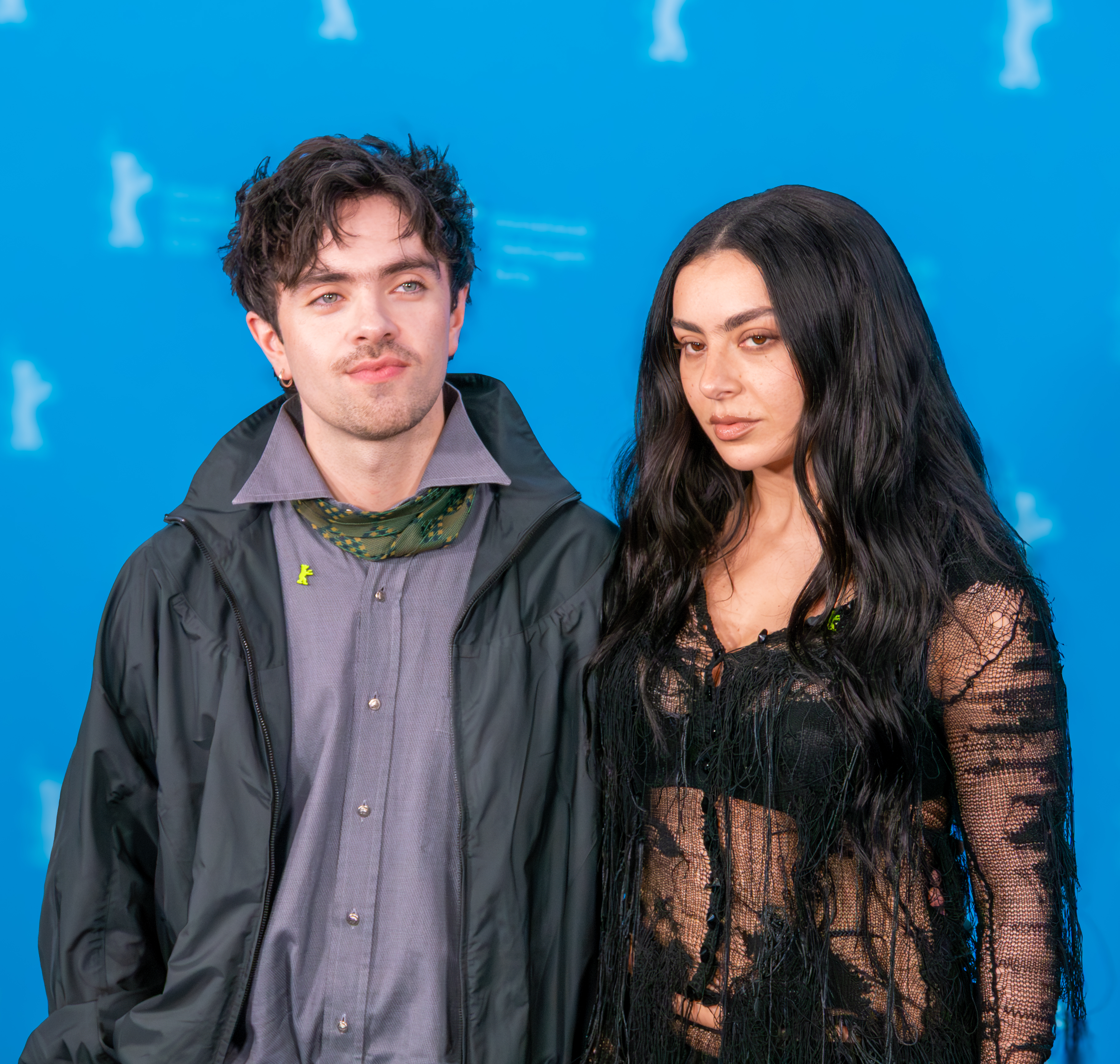
Aidan Zamiri and Charli XCX at the 76th Berlin International Film Festival in February 2026

Brat and its songs were later nominated for nine Grammy Awards at its 67th annual ceremony, with Charli XCX winning three of them, including Best Dance/Electronic Album. She then sent Scottish filmmaker Aidan Zamiri a message about her Brat success and headspace, which he read to Vanity Fair: "This feeling of having just almost got everything [she] could have wanted, and what that felt like on kind of a human level." It served as the basis for the film titled The Moment, with Charli XCX in the lead role and directed by Zamiri; it premiered at multiple festivals. (Note: The film was shown at the Sundance and Berlin International Film Festival.) After releasing her soundtrack album for Wuthering Heights on 13 February 2026, she spoke to American influencer Quenlin Blackwell about potentially quitting music and embracing acting.

Two months later, American singer Sky Ferreira suggested on social media that Charli XCX used her unreleased old demos and based tracks like "Chains of Love" and "Altars" from the Wuthering Heights project on her material without proper acknowledgment. Charli XCX's management responded to Ferreira's claims on 6 April, stating, "All relevant parties were consulted [while] songwriting credits and splits were determined and agreed collectively in writing, with reference to documented timelines and contributions." In the same press release, they added that Charli XCX was filming in Kyoto, Japan, at the time for an untitled Takashi Miike film, and she was wrapping up her upcoming studio album. She then uploaded a black and white image of herself wearing headphones to Instagram on 15 April, with the caption stating, "I love making things." Confirmed to be music-related by Charli XCX herself, she spent ten days at Rue Boyer Studios, in 2025 in Paris, France, with record producers A. G. Cook and Finn Keane.

== Themes and composition ==
Music, Fashion, Film has been described as a pop album featuring guitars influenced by "Daft Punk-inspired" electronic rock. Beginning with "Rock Music" as the lead single, it incorporates prominent distorted guitar instrumentation and Auto-Tune sounds, while maintaining the pop-oriented style characteristic of Charli XCX's work. Its lyrics continue her conversational and provocative approach, including references to nightlife, friendship, and self-aware humour. The next track, "SS26" was mainly inspired by the rock music genre, opening with light guitar lines and subdued electronic drum sounds before shifting into a more distorted sound, with a subtle dance element. It also references online backlash and cancel culture through lines such as "I was hacked, it got taken out of context, obviously". "Camera" has elements of rock through this electronic track where it explores the vulnerability of stardom. Lyrically, it tones down towards a confession by Charli XCX surrounded by glitchy guitar synths which embraces her true-self.

"Wink Wink" is a pop-rock song driven by a mid-tempo beat, clangy guitar riffs and searing synthesiser lines. It is opened with a spoken-word catalogue of provocative behaviour while adopting a tongue-in-cheek tone, with Charli XCX claiming she is "not a bad girl anymore", a statement immediately undermined by the closing "wink, wink".

"Magic Metal Montana" appeared with an "unexpected tempo" in production where Charli XCX straightforwardly wrote this post-rock track as a platonic love letter to her close friend and producer Cook. This penultimate song details their work relationship with the line "We make music, we talk that way", as well as smaller details about his taste with "You like old things, magic, metal and Montana".

== Promotion and release ==
"I'd never met either of them until the shoot. [...] A type of surreal cultural compendium assembled to document yet another form of art. I wanted to be a fly on the wall watching this unfold, but [...] the album cover allows me the birds-eye view of that moment in time. Improvisation was key."

— Cale, discusses being featured on the album cover art with Jacobs and Scorsese, to Rolling Stone.

Charli XCX uploaded a teaser video on 7 May 2026, showcasing an electric guitar being crushed by a stiletto heel. This was confirmed to be her lead single titled "Rock Music", and was released the next day alongside a music video directed by Zamiri. A black seven-inch vinyl was then produced on 9 May, that exclusively included a B-side track called "I Keep On Thinking Bout You Every Single Day and Night" with its respective video only being shared through Instagram, on her alternative account. Charli XCX soon began teasing lyrics on a Substack post, which led to her second single release of "SS26" on 21 May. Its music video was shown the same day, directed by Torso, depicting a fashion runway show in Paris with Charli XCX presenting a series of designer looks. Two days later, she dropped another B-side song titled "Playboy Bunny", with a limited vinyl and video release. She explained her reasoning about the subsequent B-side releases, stating, "They're paired together, these two songs, are because, in ways, they're totally opposite from each other, and that is [k]ind of the main point of them." The singer also added "[the songs] are never gonna go on streaming", but may potentially change in the near future. Nevertheless, "I Keep On Thinking Bout You Every Single Day and Night" was interpolated in the outro of "Card Declined" on the album itself.

Music, Fashion, Film was announced as Charli XCX's eighth studio album on 1 June 2026, and released on 24 July. The record contains eleven tracks with a total runtime of 30 minutes and 5 seconds. Its greyscale cover artwork, photographed by Zamiri, features Welsh singer John Cale, American fashion designer Marc Jacobs and filmmaker Martin Scorsese, whom Nick Reilly for Rolling Stone UK described as "three cultural greats representing each aspect" of music, fashion, and film. All three men were present for the photoshoot, which took place in a "random kitchen" at Charli XCX's request. An expanded edition of the album subtitled B-Sides Edition containing all three B-sides was released for purchase exclusively on the iTunes Store on 26 July.

A week later, Charli XCX revealed her fifth solo concert tour of the same name on 8 June 2026, beginning with four festival performances (Lollapalooza on 31 July; Outside Lands on 7 August; and Reading and Leeds Festivals on 28 and 29 August, respectively). The tour is planned to consist of an additional fourteen concerts across the United States and Canada from 11 September to 23 October, all with American musician Underscores as the supporting act. Further dates in the United Kingdom are planned.

== Critical reception ==
Professional ratings
Aggregate scores
Source	Rating
AnyDecentMusic?	8.0/10
Metacritic	81/100
Review scores
Source	Rating
AllMusic	4/5 stars
Consequence	A−
The Daily Telegraph	2/5 stars
DIY	5/5 stars
The Guardian	5/5 stars
The Independent	3/5 stars
The Line of Best Fit	9/10
Pitchfork	8.2/10
Rolling Stone	4/5 stars
The Skinny	3/5 stars

According to the review aggregator Metacritic, Music, Fashion, Film received "universal acclaim" based on a weighted average score of 81 out of 100 from twenty-seven critic scores. The review aggregator site AnyDecentMusic? compiled twenty-nine reviews and gave the album a weighted average score of 7.9 out of 10, based on their assessment of the critical consensus.

Writing for The Guardian, Laura Snapes labelled the album, following Brat, "another gorgeously astute and disarmingly deep album about the instability of identity – not just as a vanguard songwriter striving for evolution, but how much we can ever know one another, or even ourselves". Caryn Ganz of Rolling Stone called it a "brilliant, catchy, often very funny look at the machinery of fame". Ben Tipple of DIY described Music, Fashion, Film as a "sister album" to Brat, calling it a "candid, introspective triumph" that offers an "autobiographical snapshot of Charli as she is now". Writing for AllMusic, Heather Phares hailed the album as being "inquisitive and invigorated", writing that Charli XCX's feelings "run just as deep" as they did on Brat. Phares described the album's "raw and spontaneous" impressions as resulting in some of Charli XCX's "most daring and thought-provoking music". Anna Gaca of Pitchfork described the album as being "intentionally, imperfectly human", and "full of little somatic thrills—doubled vocal harmonies, sharp dynamic contrasts". Gaca wrote that the album resembles the quasi-vérité style of How I'm Feeling Now, and acknowledges the "identity hazard of being the pop star".

Michael Hoffman of The Line of Best Fit dubbed Music, Fashion, Film "Charli xcx’s most fully realised statement as an artist", where the singer is "proving herself to herself". Hoffman suggested that the track "Camera" serves as a thesis for the album, displaying "the willingness to be a beginner again, to suck a little, to let the camera expose rather than soften, but ultimately using the camera to escape her persona as Charli xcx". Conversely, Paolo Ragusa of Consequence suggested that the track "Persona" serves as the album's "thematic crux", where Charli XCX "confronts her pop star persona directly", describing it as a "particularly poignant offering that puts Charli’s inner war in perspective". Ragusa wrote that the album is "maybe [Charli XCX's] most honest one", which is the sound of the singer "trying to figure it out while the tape still rolls".

In less favourable reviews, Roisin O'Connor of The Independent found the album's sound and themes "confusing and often contradictory", suggesting some of the lyrics exploring insecurity felt "like a hangover from Brat", while Poppie Platt of The Daily Telegraph described the lyrics as "cringeworthy, surface-level platitudes" and the production as "distorted synths drown[ing] out any semblance of emotional clarity". In a review for The Skinny, Joe Creely felt that Music, Fashion, Film's moments of "pure magic" are primarily limited to its singles, while criticising the tracks "Persona" and "2007" as "lacking in definition". Creely wrote that the album "comes to life in fits and starts", and suggested that it is a "higher profile version of the mixtapes of experimentation" that the singer was putting out "in the mid-2010s".

== Commercial performance ==
In the United Kingdom, Music, Fashion, Film debuted at number one on the UK Albums Chart, becoming Charli XCX's fourth number-one album in the country. It opened with 22,322 album-equivalent units, consisting of 15,050 physical copies, 1,762 digital downloads, and 5,510 sales-equivalent streams. She became the first British female artist to chart two number-one albums in the same year, previously topping the chart with Wuthering Heights (2026) in February. The album also topped the UK Vinyl Albums Chart. In Australia, the album charted at number one on the ARIA Top 50 Albums chart, while also topping the vinyl albums chart.

In the United States, Music, Fashion, Film debuted at number three on the Billboard 200, with 78,000 album-equivalent units earned in its first week, becoming her fourth top-ten album in the country. Of that total, 57,000 were pure album sales, while 21,000 were streaming-equivalent units. Charli XCX became the only woman to have at least two debuts in the top ten of the Billboard 200 in 2026, following Wuthering Heights which debuted and peaked at number eight in February. Music, Fashion, Film became her first album to peak at number one on the US Billboard Top Album Sales chart.

== Track listing ==
All tracks are written by Charlotte Aitchison, A. G. Cook, and Finn Keane, except "Camera", "I'm Afraid", and "I Keep on Thinking Bout You Every Single Day and Night" (Aitchison, Keane), and "Magic Metal Montana" (Aitchison, Cook). All tracks are produced by A. G. Cook and Finn Keane.

No.	Title	Length
1.	"Rock Music"	1:55
2.	"SS26"	2:48
3.	"Card Declined"	3:28
4.	"Camera"	2:31
5.	"2007"	2:04
6.	"I'm Afraid"	2:11
7.	"Yeah"	2:17
8.	"Wink Wink"	2:03
9.	"Persona"	2:37
10.	"Magic Metal Montana"	2:31
11.	"No One Lasts Forever" (featuring David Cronenberg)	5:42
Total length:		30:05

iTunes Store B-Sides Edition bonus tracks
No.	Title	Length
1.	"I Keep on Thinking Bout You Every Single Day and Night"	1:31
2.	"Playboy Bunny"	2:06
3.	"If You Take Away the Music Then What Has She Got?"	2:08
Total length:		35:50

=== Notes ===
- The outro of "Card Declined" contains a rock arrangement of "I Keep On Thinking Bout You Every Single Day and Night".
- Vinyl editions omit David Cronenberg's appearance on "No One Lasts Forever", which shortens the track down to 3:06, bringing the total album length to 27:21.
- The additional content available on the B-Sides Edition is listed under a second disc, and it also includes the music videos for tracks 1–3, presented as tracks 4–6.

== Personnel ==
The credits are adapted from Tidal.

- Charli XCX – vocals, executive production
- A. G. Cook – production, mixing, executive production
- Finn Keane – production, mixing, executive production
- Ruairi O'Flaherty – mastering
- David Cronenberg – featured vocals on "No One Lasts Forever"

== Charts ==
=== Weekly charts ===
Weekly chart performance
Chart (2026)	Peak position
Australian Albums (ARIA)	1
Austrian Albums (Ö3 Austria)	4
Belgian Albums (Ultratop Flanders)	1
Belgian Albums (Ultratop Wallonia)	4
Canadian Albums (Billboard)	6
Croatian International Albums (HDU)	2
Danish Albums (Hitlisten)	17
Dutch Albums (Album Top 100)	3
Finnish Albums (Suomen virallinen lista)	5
French Albums (SNEP)	15
German Albums (Offizielle Top 100)	6
German Pop Albums (Offizielle Top 100)	1
Greek Albums (IFPI)	2
Hungarian Albums (MAHASZ)	1
Irish Albums (Official Charts)	3
Italian Albums (FIMI)	15
Japanese Download Albums (Billboard Japan)	52
Japanese Western Albums (Oricon)	22
Lithuanian Albums (AGATA)	12
New Zealand Albums (RMNZ)	1
Norwegian Albums (IFPI Norge)	34
Polish Albums (ZPAV)	3
Portuguese Albums (AFP)	7
Scottish Albums (Official Charts)	1
Spanish Albums (PROMUSICAE)	4
Swedish Albums (Sverigetopplistan)	10
Swiss Albums (Schweizer Hitparade)	3
UK Albums (Official Charts)	1
US Billboard 200	3
US Top Rock & Alternative Albums (Billboard)	2

=== Monthly charts ===
Monthly chart performance
Chart (2026)	Position
Croatian International Vinyl Albums (HDU)	2

== Release history ==
List of release dates, editions, and formats
Date	Format(s)	Edition	Label	Ref.
24 July 2026	CD; cassette tape; digital download; streaming; vinyl	Standard	Atlantic	
26 July 2026	Digital download	B-Sides	Atlantic	
