= Finn Keane =

British songwriter and record producer

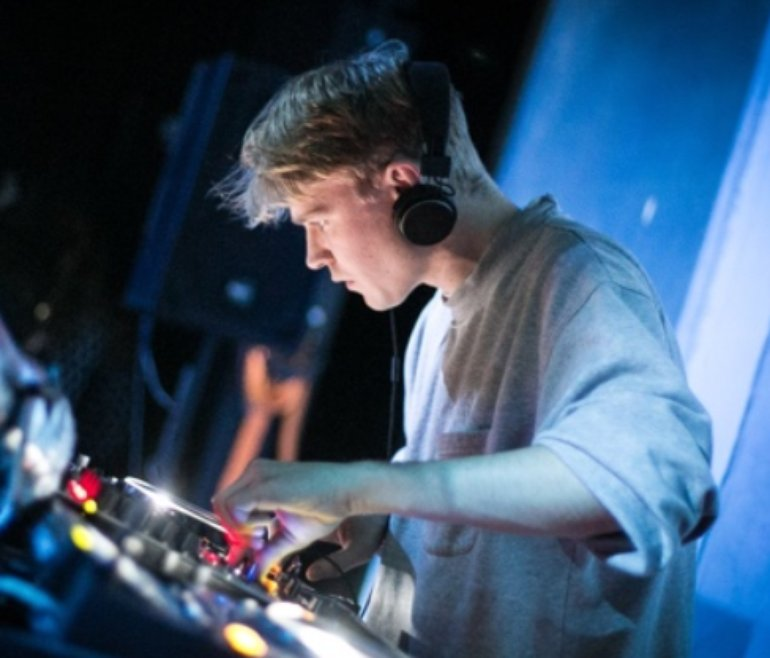
- Keane performing in 2020

Background information
- Genres: Electronic; hyperpop; avant-pop; bubblegum bass
- Occupations: Record producer; DJ; musician; songwriter
- Years active: 2013–present
- Label: PC Music
- Member of: Thy Slaughter

Finn Keane, previously known as Easyfun (stylised in all caps and formerly as easyFun), is a British songwriter and record producer. He is known for his frequent collaborations with Charli XCX, his releases on experimental pop label PC Music, and his work with the label's founder A. G. Cook in the duo Thy Slaughter. His work with Charli XCX has earned him two Grammy Award nominations: Album of the Year for Brat and Best Dance Pop Recording for "Von Dutch", of which he won the latter.

== Career ==
=== 2013–2015: Career beginnings ===
Keane's first release in 2013, originally under the name Easyfun, was a five-track self-titled EP with an early version of what would become PC Music's signature sound of bubblegum pop, futuristic riffs and chaotic arrangements. Pitchfork later described the album as a "gaseous and disorienting beat tape that sounded a little like a methed-out take on TNGHT’s permanently in-the-red hip-hop experiments."

Keane also joined the collaborative project Thy Slaughter with PC Music founder A. G. Cook in 2014, releasing their debut single, "Bronze", as part of PC Music Volume 1. Cook and Keane did not release any further music under the Thy Slaughter name for the following nine years.

=== 2016–2024: Songwriting and production, EPs, Thy Slaughter return and Brat ===
Cook and Keane eventually started the collaboration easyFX as part of a Columbia Records deal with PC Music. Under this name, the two worked together to write and produce songs for Columbia to assign to its emerging artists. This project was later dropped when management at Columbia changed and PC Music lost its supporters within the label.

Hannah Diamond released her single "Invisible" in October 2019, co-produced by Keane and Cook. In 2022, Keane produced Bree Runway's single "That Girl". Keane has songwriting and production credits on Charli XCX's mixtapes Number 1 Angel and Pop 2 and her album Charli.

In August 2023, Keane released two EPs named Acoustic and Electric. Pitchfork gave Electric a score of 7.1/10, calling its songs "works of unadulterated nostalgia" and "a surprisingly emotional experience" with "deep, shuddering bass notes and unashamedly romantic melodies", and included the EP in a list of the best pop music of 2023.

In June 2023, Charli XCX released the Keane-produced single "Speed Drive" as part of Barbie the Album, the soundtrack of the 2023 film Barbie. Keane also reunited with Cook in a return for Thy Slaughter that year, releasing the album Soft Rock on 1 December 2023. This followed the singles "Sentence" and "If I Knew", as well as the release of singles "Lost Everything" and "Reign" on 16 November that year which were used to announce the album. "Lost Everything" was co-written by the late Sophie and Ellie Rowsell. This was one of the final releases from the PC Music label before it pivoted solely to archival releases.

Keane worked with Cook and George Daniel on the production for Charli XCX's 2024 album Brat. Keane has stated that in producing the album he tried to "make the strongest and most confident music" he could, and noted that he and Charli XCX had created "Speed Drive" and "Von Dutch" in one day.

=== 2024–present: EasyGroup lawsuit and The Finn Keane Album ===
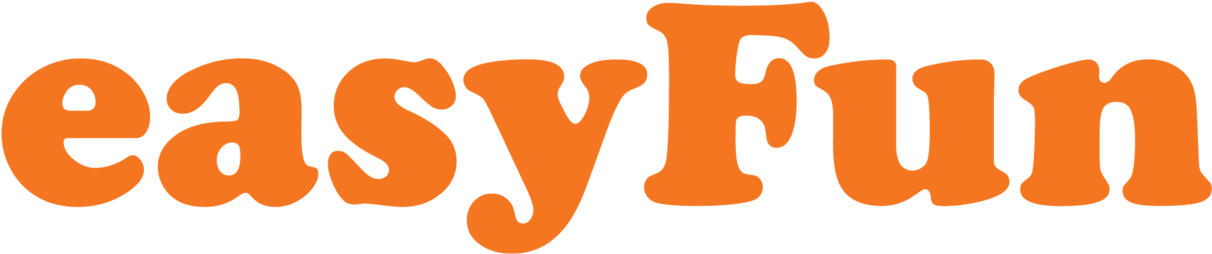
Keane's logo prior to the EasyGroup lawsuit

EasyJet's logo

In October 2023, EasyJet's parent company EasyGroup sued the music label PC Music and its founder, Cook, for "mimic[ing] easyGroup’s famous branding to create instant brand recognition for his ‘DJing business." The lawsuit initially resulted in only the cover for Keane's album Deep Trouble being changed; it had originally depicted people leaving an aircraft which bore the text "easyFun" after a water landing, but was changed to a computer-generated image of water with Easyfun's logo at its base. However in October 2024, Keane announced The Finn Keane Album, which was to be a compilation album of his previous work, released a remix of his song "Laplander" and stated that he would fully leave the Easyfun moniker behind. On the same day as this announcement, Willow Kayne released her Keane-produced single "I’ve Got This All Under Control", featuring "synthesizers, fast-paced percussion, and a prominent bassline" according to Dork. He fully retired the name at PC Music's Halloween event, Pop Crypt II, in London.

In 2025, "Von Dutch" won best dance pop recording and Brat won best dance/electronic album at the 67th Annual Grammy Awards. Keane accepted the award for "Von Dutch" on behalf of Charli XCX.

== Discography ==
=== Compilation albums ===
Year	Title	Release date	Label
2024	The Finn Keane Album	1 November 2024	PC Music

=== EPs ===
Year	Title	Release date	Label
2013	Debut EP	25 June 2013	PC Music
2015	Deep Trouble	26 February 2015	PC Music
2023	Electric	11 August 2023	PC Music
2023	Acoustic	13 October 2023	PC Music

=== Singles ===
Year	Title	Release date	Label
2016	"Monopoly" (featuring Noonie Bao)	15 November 2016	PC Music
2017	"Blink"	28 July 2017	PC Music
2018	"Be Your USA" (featuring Iiris)	25 May 2018	PC Music
2022	"Audio"	21 April 2022	PC Music
2023	"Audio (All I Ever Got)"	28 September 2023	PC Music
2023	"Sentence" / "If I Knew" (with A. G. Cook, as Thy Slaughter)	26 October 2023	PC Music
2023	"Lost Everything" / "Reign" (with A. G. Cook, as Thy Slaughter)	16 November 2023	PC Music
2024	"Laplander" (Finn Keane remix)	17 October 2024	PC Music

== Songwriting and production credits ==
Year	Title	Artist(s)	Album	Credits	Writer(s)	Producer(s)
2016	"Got My Chad"	GFOTY	VIPOTY	Co-writer/co-producer	GFOTY, A. G. Cook, Keane	Cook, Keane
2016	"Fade Away"	Hannah Diamond	Reflections	Co-writer/co-producer	Hannah Amond, Cook, Keane	Cook, Keane
2016	"Make Believe"	Hannah Diamond	Reflections	Co-writer/co-producer	Hannah Amond, Cook, Keane	Cook, Keane
2017	"3AM (Pull Up)" (feat. MØ)	Charli XCX	Number 1 Angel	Co-writer/co-producer	Charlotte Aitchison, Cook, Keane, Karen Marie Ørsted	Cook, Keane
2017	"Emotional"	Charli XCX	Number 1 Angel	Co-producer	Aitchison, Patrik Berger	Cook, Keane
2017	"Stranger"	Iiris	Non-album single	Co-writer	Iiris, Keane, Max Doohan	ProVerb
2017	"Midnight Vibes"	RahRah Q	Non-album single	Co-writer	Keane, RahRahQ, Brandon Skeie, Miya Folick, Lil Data	David Gamson
2017	"Backseat" (feat. Carly Rae Jepsen)	Charli XCX	Pop 2	Co-writer/co-producer	Aitchison, Cook, Keane, Carly Rae Jepsen	Keane, Cook
2017	"Femmebot" (feat. Dorian Electra & Mykki Blanco)	Charli XCX	Pop 2	Co-writer/co-producer	A. G. Cook, David Gamson, Keane, Francisca Hall, Michael Quattelbaum Jr.	Cook, David Gamson, Keane
2017	"Porsche" (feat. MØ)	Charli XCX	Pop 2	Co-producer	Charlotte Aitchison, Cook, Henry Allen, Cassia O'Reilly, Karen Marie Ørsted	Cook, Keane, King Henry
2018	"Be My Anime"	Rat Boy	Civil Disorder	Co-producer	Rat Boy, L Devine	Keane, Rat Boy
2018	"You Say"	Sarah Close	And Now, We're Shining	Co-writer/producer	Sarah Close, Christy "Zee" Zakarias, Jerker Hansson, Keane	Keane
2018	"Apps" (feat. Robokid)	Sakima	Non-album single	Producer	SAKIMA, Robokid	Keane
2018	"Let You Love Me"	Rita Ora	Phoenix	Co-writer/co-producer	Rita Ora, Fred Gibson, Keane, Linus Wiklund, Noonie Bao, Ilsey Juber	Fred Again, Keane
2019	"Sick Thoughts"	Lou Bliss	Non-album single	Co-writer/producer	Melissa Faith Storwick, James Yami Bell, Keane, Lou Bliss	Keane
2019	"Blame It On Your Love" (feat. Lizzo)	Charli XCX	Charli	Co-writer/additional production	Aitchison, Noonie Bao, Lizzo, Sasha Sloan, StarGate, Keane	StarGate, Keane (add.), Cook (add.)
2019	"Official"	Charli XCX	Charli	Co-writer/co- producer	Aitchison, Cook, Noonie Bao, Berger, Keane	Cook, Keane, Berger
2019	"Not Ready for Love"	TCTS	Non-album single	Co-writer	Keane, Gracey, Samuel O'Neill	TCTS
2019	"LA & The Parties"	Lost Kings	Lost Angeles EP	Co-writer	Luh Kel, Keane, Nick Shanholtz, Paul Jacobs, Robert Abisi	Lost Kings
2019	"Invisible"	Hannah Diamond	Reflections	Co-writer/co- producer	Amond, Cook, Keane, Thomas Carrell, Christopher Mason	Cook, Keane
2020	"Airhead"	A. G. Cook	Apple	Co-writer	Cook, Hayden Dunham, Keane	Cook
2020	"Girl On My Throne" (feat. Casey MQ)	Oklou	Galore	Co-writer	Marylou Mayniel, Casey Manierka, Cook, Keane	Casey MQ, Florian Le Prise, Oklou (co.), Cook (add.)
2020	"Little Nokia"	Bree Runway	2000and4Eva	Co-writer/producer	Brenda Mensah, Chloe Tighe, Keane	Keane
2021	"Want"	MNDR	Hell To Be You Baby	Co-writer	Amanda Warner, Keane, Peter Wade Keusch	MNDR, Peter Wade, Babydaddy
2021	"Gone"	MNDR	Hell To Be You Baby	Co-writer	Amanda Warner, Keane, Peter Wade Keusch, Scott Hoffman, Tom Stafford	MNDR, Peter Wade, Babydaddy
2021	"You For Me" (feat. Rita Ora)	Sigala	Non-album single	Co-writer	Cook, Aitchison, Keane, Joakim Jarl, Madison Love, Rita Sahatçiu Ora, Bruce Fielder	Sigala, Jarly, Neave Applebaum
2021	"Sad Song"	Gracey	Fragile EP	Producer	Finlay Dow Smith, Grace Barker, Jonny Write	Keane, Starsmith
2022	"Into My Arms"	Hyd	Non-album single	Producer	Nick Cave	Keane
2022	"Somebody Like You"	Bree Runway	Non-album single	Co-writer/co-producer	Brenda Mensah, Keane, Klahr, Levi Gordon, Liohn	Keane, Liohn, Klahr, Levi Gordon
2022	"Co1n"	LVL1	Play	Co-writer/producer	Emilio Martín, Keane, Guillermo Rodriguez Moracho, Luthien Barrea Barroso	Keane
2022	"Lonely Heart" (feat. Gracey)	Europa	Non-album single	Additional production	Timucin Lam, Martin Solveig, Josh Grimmet, Ethan Shore, Grace Barker	Jax Jones, Martin Solveig, Goodboys (add.), Neave Applebaum (add.), Keane (add.), Mark Ralph (add.)
2022	"So Clear"	Hyd	Clearing	Co-writer/co-producer	Hyd, Keane, Sophie	Keane, Sophie, Cook (add.)
2022	"Breaking Ground"	Hyd	Clearing	Co-writer/producer	Hyd, Keane	Keane, Cook (add.)
2022	"Chlorophyll"	Hyd	Clearing	Co-writer/co-producer	Hyd, Keane	Thy Slaughter
2022	"Archive Mami"	Bree Runway	WOAH, WHAT A BLUR!	Co-writer/producer	Bree Runway, Keane, Richard Zastenker	Keane
2022	"Breee!"	Bree Runway	WOAH, WHAT A BLUR!	Co-writer/co-producer	Bree Runway, Keane, Klahr, Richard Zastenker, Atia "Ink" Boggs	Liohn, Klahr, Keane
2022	"FWMM"	Bree Runway	WOAH, WHAT A BLUR!	Co-writer/co-producer	Bree Runway, Keane, Klahr, Liohn, Trey Campbell	Liohn, Klahr, Keane
2022	"That Girl"	Bree Runway	WOAH, WHAT A BLUR!	Co-writer/producer	Bree Runway, Keane, Richard Zastenker	Keane
2023	"Speed Drive"	Charli XCX	Barbie the Album	Co-writer/producer	Charli XCX, David James Parker, Keane, Ewart Everton Brown, Fabian Peter Torsson, Frans Joakim Ahlund, Klas Frans Åhlund, Michael Chapman, Nicholas Chinn, Patrik Knut Arve, Sylvia Robinson, Troy Rami	Keane
2023	"Automatic"	Birdy	Portraits	Additional production	Birdy, Gabe Simon, Mark Crew, Dan Priddy	Gabe Simon, Mark Crew, Dan Priddy, Keane (add.)
2023	"Impossible"	Hannah Diamond	Perfect Picture	Co-writer	Hannah Amond, David Gamson, Alexander Guy Cook, Keane, Nate Campany	David Gamson
2023	"Think Of Us" (with GRACEY)	The Chainsmokers	Summertime Friends	Co-writer/co-producer	Alex Pall, Andrew Taggart, Keane, Grace Barker	The Chainsmokers, Keane
2024	"Ride or Die"	Baby Queen	TBA	Co-producer	Baby Queen, King Ed	King Ed, Keane
2024	"360"	Charli XCX	Brat	Co-writer/additional production	Cook, Blake Slatkin, Aitchison, Keane, Henry Walter, Omer Fedi	Cook, Cirkut, Keane (add.)
2024	"Sympathy Is a Knife"	Charli XCX	Brat	Co-writer/co-producer	Aitchison, Keane, Jonathan Christopher Shave	Charli XCX, Keane
2024	"Von Dutch"	Charli XCX	Brat	Co-writer/producer	Aitchison, Keane	Keane
2024	"So I"	Charli XCX	Brat	Co-writer	Aitchison, Keane, Shave	Cook, Jon Shave
2024	"I Think About It All the Time"	Charli XCX	Brat	Co-writer/co-producer	Cook, Aitchison, Keane, Shave	Cook, Keane
2024	"Spring Breakers"	Charli XCX	Brat	Co-writer/co-producer	Cook, Aitchison, Keane, Shave	Cook, Keane, Shave
2024	"Just Like That"	Bree Runway	TBA	Co-writer/co-producer	Brenda Mensah, Keane, Richard Zastenker	Keane, Johannes Klahr, Richard Zastenker
2024	"If You Get It You Get It"	Bimini	TBA	Co-writer/co-producer	Bimini, Keane, Grace Barker, Matt Rad	Matt Rad, Keane
2024	"Control"	Bimini	TBA	Co-writer/co-producer	Bimini, Keane, Matt Rad, Sarah Boe	Matt Rad, Keane
2024	"2BadGyalz"	Bree Runway	TBA	Co-producer	Brenda Mensah	Raf Riley, Keane
2024	"So Tru"	Confidence Man	3AM (LA LA LA)	Co-writer/additional production	Janet Planet, Sugar Bones, Reggie Goodchild, Ina Wroldsen, Keane	Reggie Goodchild, Keane (add.)
2024	"I've Got This All Under Control"	Willow Kayne	The Zenosyne	Co-writer/co-producer	Keane, James Murray, Mustafa Omer, Willow Kayne	Mojam, Keane
2025	"Cupid's Bow"	Olly Alexander	Polari	Additional production	Olly Alexander, Danny L Harle	Danny L Harle, Keane (add.)
2025	"Dizzy"	Olly Alexander	Polari	Additional production	Olly Alexander, Danny L Harle	Danny L Harle, Keane (add.)
2025	"House" (feat. John Cale)	Charli XCX	Wuthering Heights	Co-writer/producer	Aitchison, Keane, John Cale, Nathan Klein	Keane
2025	"Chains of Love"	Charli XCX	Wuthering Heights	Co-writer/producer	Aitchison, Keane, Justin Raisen	Keane, Raisen
2025	"Precious"	Jae Stephens	TOTAL SELLOUT	Co-writer/producer	Stephens, Keane, Marlon Roudette	Keane
2026	"Wall of Sound"	Charli XCX	Wuthering Heights	Co-writer/producer	Aitchison, Keane	Keane
2026	"Rock Music"	Charli XCX	Music, Fashion, Film	Co-writer/producer	Aitchison, Cook, Keane	Cook, Keane
2026	"SS26"	Charli XCX	Music, Fashion, Film	Co-writer/producer	Aitchison, Cook, Keane	Cook, Keane
2026	"Card Declined"	Charli XCX	Music, Fashion, Film	Co-writer/producer	Aitchison, Cook, Keane	Cook, Keane
2026	"Camera"	Charli XCX	Music, Fashion, Film	Co-writer/producer	Aitchison, Keane	Cook, Keane
2026	"2007"	Charli XCX	Music, Fashion, Film	Co-writer/producer	Aitchison, Cook, Keane	Cook, Keane
2026	"I'm Afraid"	Charli XCX	Music, Fashion, Film	Co-writer/producer	Aitchison, Keane	Cook, Keane
2026	"Yeah"	Charli XCX	Music, Fashion, Film	Co-writer/producer	Aitchison, Cook, Keane	Cook, Keane
2026	"Wink Wink"	Charli XCX	Music, Fashion, Film	Co-writer/producer	Aitchison, Keane	Cook, Keane
2026	"Persona"	Charli XCX	Music, Fashion, Film	Co-writer/producer	Aitchison, Cook, Keane	Cook, Keane
2026	"Magic Metal Montana"	Charli XCX	Music, Fashion, Film	Co-producer	Aitchison, Cook	Cook, Keane
2026	"No One Lasts Forever" (featuring David Cronenberg)	Charli XCX	Music, Fashion, Film	Co-writer/producer	Aitchison, Cook, Keane	Cook, Keane
2026	"Burning Heart"	Carly Rae Jepsen	Day and Night	Co-writer	Jepsen, Pontus Winnberg, Vincent Pontare, Keane	Magnus Lidehäll, Pontare
2026	"Sweettooth"	Jennie	Fallen Angel	Co-writer/producer	Jennie, Tyler Spry, Sam Homaee, Keane, Johnathan Bach, Jelli Dorman, Bibi Bourelly, Alexis Kesselman	Spry, Homaee, Keane

=== Remixes ===
Year	Title	Artist(s)
2015	"I.D.L"	Life Sim (with A. G. Cook, as Thy Slaughter)
2017	"Taker"	K.I.D
2017	"No Sleeep"	Janet Jackson
2018	"Wildfire"	Slow Magic
2019	"Comme si"	Christine and the Queens
2019	"1999"	Charli XCX, Troye Sivan
2021	"Beautiful Superstar"	A. G. Cook
2021	"4Runner"	Rostam
2022	"Demonic"	Namasenda, La Zowi (with A. G. Cook, as Thy Slaughter)
2024	"Sympathy Is a Knife"	Charli XCX, Ariana Grande
2024	"Everything is Romantic"	Charli XCX, Caroline Polachek
2024	"B2b"	Charli XCX, Tinashe
2024	"365"	Charli XCX, Shygirl, Toby Wincorn
2024	"Spring Breakers"	Charli XCX, Kesha
2025	"Sugar Free Venom"	F5ve, Kesha
