= Magic Metal Montana =

Song by Charli XCX

from the album Music, Fashion, Film
- Released: 24 July 2026
- Genre: New wave; post-rock
- Length: 2:31
- Label: Atlantic
- Songwriters: Charlotte Aitchison; Alexander Guy Cook
- Producers: Charli XCX; A. G. Cook

"Magic Metal Montana" is a song by British singer and songwriter Charli XCX. It was released on 24 July 2026, under exclusive license to Atlantic Records, as the penultimate track from her seventh studio album, Music, Fashion, Film. The new wave and post-rock song is a platonic love letter to her producer, A. G. Cook, who has produced on every project since Number 1 Angel (2017).

== Composition and lyrics ==
"Magic Metal Montana" has been described as a new wave and post-rock track. In the song, Charli XCX straightforwardly details her creative connection with Cook with the line "We make music, we talk that way", as well as smaller details about his taste with "You like old things, magic, metal and Montana" and "Drink some whiskey, but not really / You don’t drink, so I’ll drink for two". However, she then states that she would "cry if you died". Heavy reference to her late collaborator SOPHIE is mentioned in lines like "I’d be nothing without you/I think you taught me, I think I taught you".

== Critical reception ==
The Fader called the song "a heartfelt ode to friend and collaborator A. G. Cook" and said "This almost diaristic portrait of her friendship with Cook is both a straightforward look at an enduring relationship, and a more broad mediation on friendship itself. Overall, it's just very, very sweet". Vulture said the track was "both the silliest song on an intentionally casual album and one of the record’s surprisingly moving apexes" and said the song was written in "Charli's trademark non-rhyming lilt, curtly describing their working relationship". Jason Frank, writing for Vulture, also said "Charli attempting to get across how much she cares about Cook takes on an epic, artful function. She’s contending with the very real possibility of loss as time continues to pass by and is realizing that the art she and Cook have made together isn’t enough. She needs to tell him how she feels. The song is blunt and not particularly pretty or high-concept, but that’s what makes it great". Variety said "her trademark effervescent melodies shine through" and said the song "features her effortless melody lines and sparkling synth flourishes". Beats Per Minute said the instrumentals of the piece reminded them of The Strokes and said the lyrics were "earnest and passionate commitment" and that "It’s such a cool track, once more using artistic elements for meta narration".
