= Wink Wink =

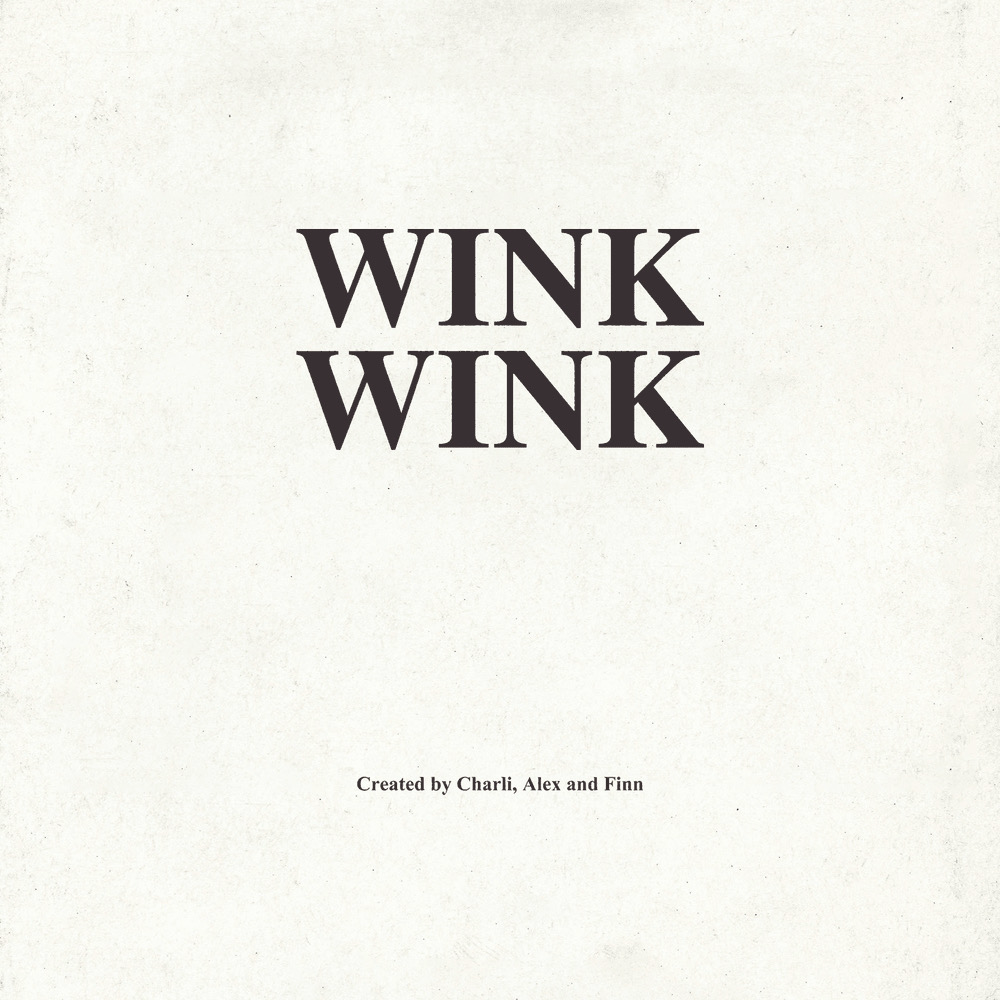

Single by Charli XCX

from the album Music, Fashion, Film
- Released: 26 June 2026
- Genre: Pop rock; electropop; alternative rock; hyperpop; pop
- Length: 2:03
- Label: Atlantic
- Songwriters: Charlotte Aitchison; Finn Keane
- Producers: A. G. Cook; Finn Keane

Charli XCX singles chronology
"SS26" (2026)	"Wink Wink" (2026)	"Camera" (2026)

Music video
- "Wink Wink" on YouTube

"Wink Wink" is a song by British singer and songwriter Charli XCX. It was released on 26 June 2026, under exclusive license to Atlantic Records, as the third single from her eighth studio album, Music, Fashion, Film. A pop rock, electropop, alternative rock, hyperpop, and pop song, Charli XCX wrote the track along with Finn Keane, who produced it with A. G. Cook. It reached number 57 on the UK Singles Chart.

== Background and promotion ==
Following the releases of "Rock Music" and "SS26", "Wink Wink" was released on 26 June 2026, serving as the third single from Charli XCX's seventh studio album, Music, Fashion, Film. She described the track as "final piece in the Music, Fashion, Film rollout". A week earlier of the song's release, Charli XCX posted a caption "Something horny is coming" on her social media.

== Composition ==
"Wink Wink" was co-written by Finn Keane, who produced the song along with A. G. Cook; both also mixed it, executively producing the song with Charli XCX. "Wink Wink" was mastered by Ruairi O'Flaherty. An electropop, hyperpop, pop, and pop-rock song, it is driven by a mid-tempo beat, clangy guitar riffs and searing synthesiser lines. Although Charli XCX denied that her Music, Fashion, Film was a rock album, "Wink Wink" draws on influences beyond dance music, featuring its alt-rock sound.

Opening with a spoken-word catalogue of provocative behaviour, "Wink Wink" adopts a tongue-in-cheek tone. Its chorus has Charli XCX claiming she is "not a bad girl anymore", a statement immediately undermined by the closing "wink, wink". The song adopts a lighter, more ironic tone than "SS26" and "Rock Music".

== Music video ==
The accompanying music video for "Wink Wink" was directed by Aidan Zamiri, whose previous collaboration with Charli included an A24 mockumentary, The Moment (2026). It was released on June 25, 2026, and filmed near Charli XCX's hometown of Start Hill, Essex earlier that month. Opening with Charli XCX lying in a field and eating berries beneath a cloudy sky, the video shows her writing in a diary while singing about having changed before she performs a series of household chores, including washing windows, doing laundry, and washing dishes. As the chorus begins, the scenes become increasingly suggestive by singing "Here's the truth, and I gotta be honest / I'm not a bad girl anymore, I promise."

== Critical reception ==
Stereogum's Chris DeVille and Tom Breihan described "Wink Wink" as a tongue-in-cheek song with sexually suggestive lyrics, interpreting its repeated insistence that Charli XCX is "not a bad girl anymore" as contradicting the message that "people can change". Bill Pearis of BrooklynVegan highlighted the song's "catchy chorus" and compared its structure and style to the French band the Teenagers's 2008 song "Homecoming". Melodic Magazine author Georgia Knowlden described "Wink Wink" as a "playful detour" that builds anticipation for the album and compared it to Charli XCX's "Guess" (2024) while calling them more "provocative". Nina Corcoran of Pitchfork called the song a contender for 2026 song of the summer.

== Personnel ==
Credits were adapted from Tidal.

- Charlotte Aitchison – lead vocals, songwriter, executive producer
- Alexander Guy Cook – producer, executive producer, mixing
- Finn Keane – producer, songwriter, executive producer, mixing
- Ruairi O'Flaherty – mastering

== Charts ==
Chart performance
Chart (2026)	Peak position
Estonia Airplay (TopHit)	85
Ireland (IRMA)	67
Italy Airplay (EarOne)	51
Lithuania Airplay (TopHit)	159
New Zealand Hot Singles (RMNZ)	6
UK Singles (Official Charts)	57
US Bubbling Under Hot 100 (Billboard)	23
US Hot Rock & Alternative Songs (Billboard)	38

== Release history ==
Release dates and formats
Region	Date	Format	Label	Ref.
Various	26 June 2026	Digital download; streaming	Atlantic	
Italy	10 July 2026	Radio airplay	Warner	
