= Aidan Zamiri =

Scottish filmmaker

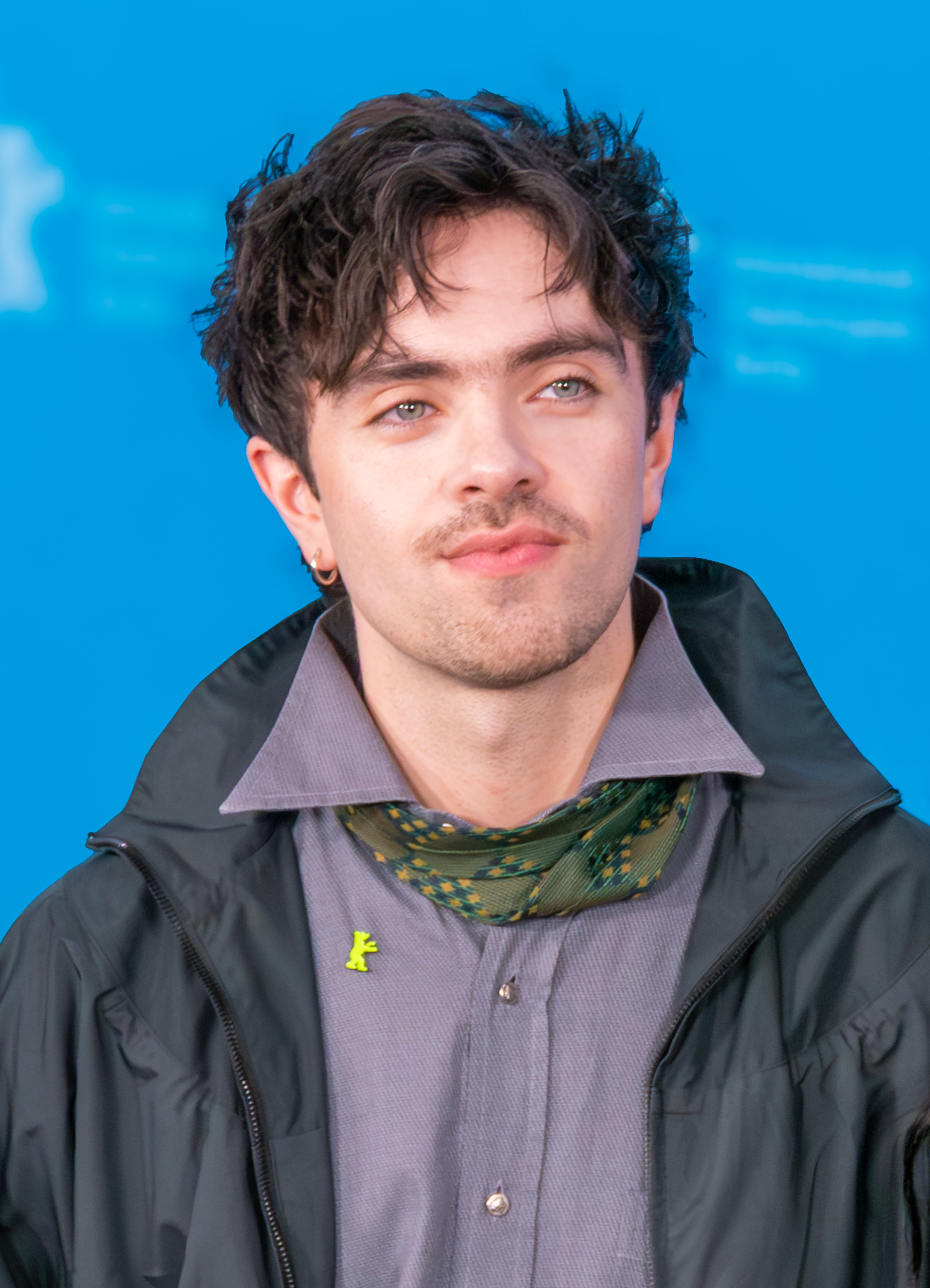
- Zamiri in 2026
- Born: Aidan O'Rourke; November 11, 1995 (age 31)
- Education: Central Saint Martins
- Occupations: Photographer; film director
- Years active: 2020–present

Aidan O'Rourke, known professionally as Aidan Zamiri, is a Scottish photographer and filmmaker. A graduate of Central Saint Martins, Zamiri studied graphic design at the university but quickly moved behind the camera. He is known for his creative partnerships with musicians Caroline Polachek, FKA Twigs, Charli XCX and actor Timothée Chalamet, among others. This work has included music videos, advertising campaigns, fashion photography and package design for his various clients.

Zamiri's film directorial debut, The Moment (2026), is a mockumentary film documenting the rehearsal process leading up to Charli XCX's Brat 2024-25 arena tour.

== Early life ==
Zamiri grew up in a suburb of Glasgow. His mother is Iranian and his father is Scottish-Irish. He attended Mearns Castle high School and then Central Saint Martins, where he studied graphic design, graduating in 2017. He chose Zamiri as his professional name as it is his grandmother's maiden name and easier to search than O'Rourke.

== Career ==
One of Zamiri's first jobs behind the camera was to document Victoria Beckham's travels with her family across Europe and the Middle East. He is known for directing numerous music videos, including the videos for the songs "360" and "Guess" by Charli XCX, "Birds of a Feather" by Billie Eilish and "Sum Bout U" by 645AR featuring FKA Twigs.

Zamiri has directed and photographed ad campaigns for Nike, Google and Converse, and magazine spreads featuring Timothée Chalamet and Linda Evangelista, among others.

He also shot the album covers for Sega Bodega's Romeo and Dennis albums, PinkPantheress' Heaven knows and Caroline Polachek's Desire, I Want to Turn Into You.

Zamiri first met Chalamet in 2024, the actor contacted him as he wanted Zamiri to shoot his Rolling Stone cover after seeing his music videos online. They quickly became close friends, with Chalamet describing him as a "creative partner". They have worked together on Chalamet's press tours for the films A Complete Unknown (2024) and Marty Supreme (2025).

In 2026, Zamiri made his feature directorial debut with The Moment, a mockumentary film surrounding Charli XCX preparing for her Brat Tour and satirizing the cultural phenomenon Brat Summer. He first met the musician in 2022 at Polachek's birthday party.

== Awards and honors ==
In 2024, Zamiri won Video of the Year and Best Pop Video for 360 at the UK Music Video Awards.

== Filmography ==
=== Film ===
- The Moment (2026) – as director and co-screenwriter, with Bertie Brandes
- Untitled Takashi Miike film (TBA) - as producer

=== Music videos ===
- "Party" by Planet 1999 (2020) – co-directed with Eamonn Freel
- "All of My Love" by RAYE & Young Adz (2020)
- "So When You Gonna..." by Dream Wife (2020)
- "Sum Bout U" by 645AR featuring FKA Twigs (2020)
- "Slime" by Shygirl (2020) – co-directed with Shygirl
- "Moonrise" by Ultra Caro (2021) – also editor
- "Over U" by Ultra Caro (2021) – also editor
- "Ride the Dragon" by FKA Twigs (2022)
- "Meta Angel" by FKA Twigs (2022) – also editor
- "Jealousy" by FKA Twigs featuring Rema (2022)
- "Darjeeling" by FKA Twigs featuring Jorja Smith & Unknown T (2022) – also editor
- "Bliss" by Yung Lean featuring FKA Twigs (2022) – also co-editor, with Jack Foster
- "Papi Bones" by FKA Twigs featuring Shygirl (2022) – also co-editor, with Jack Foster
- "Oh My Love" by FKA Twigs (2022) – also co-editor, with Jack Foster
- "Honda" by FKA Twigs featuring Pa Salieu (2022) – also co-editor, with Jack Foster
- "Which Way" by FKA Twigs featuring Dystopia (2022) – also editor
- "Thank You Song" by FKA Twigs (2022) – also editor
- "Picture in My Mind" by PinkPantheress featuring Sam Gellaitry (2022)
- "Sugar" by Obongjayar (2022)
- "Pamplemousse" by FKA Twigs (2022) – co-directed with Yuma Burgess
- "Greatest Hits" by Jockstrap (2022)
- "Jetski" by Tiberius B (2023)
- "HHB" by Tiberius B (2023)
- "Victorious" by Yung Lean & Bladee (2023)
- "Capable of Love" by PinkPantheress (2023)
- "360" by Charli XCX (2024) – also writer
- "Guess" by Charli XCX featuring Billie Eilish (2024)
- "Birds of a Feather" by Billie Eilish (2024)
- "Forever Yung" by Yung Lean (2025)
- "Residue" by A. G. Cook (2026)
- "Rock Music" by Charli XCX (2026)
- "Wink Wink'' by Charli XCX (2026)
- ”Camera” by Charli XCX (2026)
- ”Innocent Smile” By Skepta featuring Suggs and Chase & Status (2026)
