= Party 4 U =

2025 single by Charli XCX

Single by Charli XCX

from the album How I'm Feeling Now
- Released: 13 May 2025
- Recorded: May 2017 – 2020
- Genre: Pop; hyperpop; electronic pop
- Length: 4:57 (album version); 3:01 (radio edit)
- Label: Atlantic
- Songwriters: Charlotte Aitchison; Alexander Guy Cook
- Producer: A. G. Cook

Charli XCX singles chronology
"Talk Talk" (2024)	"Party 4 U" (2025)	"Everything Is Romantic" (2025)

Music video
- "Party 4 U" on YouTube

"Party 4 U" (stylised in all lowercase) is a song by the British singer and songwriter Charli XCX from her fourth studio album, How I'm Feeling Now (2020). She wrote the song with its producer A. G. Cook. "Party 4 U" is a pop, hyperpop, and electronic pop track that incorporates echoing synths and crescendoing composition. The lyrics describe hosting a party for a person who never arrives.

"Party 4 U" resurged in popularity in early 2025 after going viral on TikTok, leading Atlantic Records to release it as a single to US contemporary hit radio on 13 May 2025. A music video was released on 15 May 2025, coinciding with the fifth anniversary of How I'm Feeling Now. It was listed as one of the best music videos of the year by multiple publications and received a nomination at the UK Music Video Awards. A 7-inch vinyl of the song was released on 18 April 2026, as part of Record Store Day.

Critics generally praised "Party 4 U" for its composition and Charli XCX's vocal performance. Commercially, the track reached number 42 on the Billboard Global 200 and the top twenty in Ireland, Malaysia, the Philippines, Singapore and the United Kingdom. Charli XCX included it on the set lists of Crash: The Live Tour (2022–2023) the Brat Tour (2024–2025), and the Music, Fashion, Film Tour (2026-2026), and performed it at several other events. The song was featured in the film Bottoms (2023) and the television series Overcompensating (2025).

== Production and initial release ==
Charli XCX started recording "Party 4 U" in May 2017, and completed recording its first part in the same year. It was intended to appear on her fourth mixtape, Pop 2 (2017), but it was excluded from the track listing. "Party 4 U" became a fan favourite track after she performed it at a concert in Tokyo in May 2017, with snippets from the song appearing in her subsequent live shows and online videos. Charli XCX completed "Party 4 U" during the recording sessions of her fourth studio album, How I'm Feeling Now, in 2020, which she conceived during the COVID-19 lockdowns. She wrote the song with its producer A. G. Cook, who additionally played synthesisers and provided drum programming. It was mastered by Stuart Hawkes, and mixed by Geoff Swan with assistance from Niko Battistini.

In April 2020, Charli XCX announced that How I'm Feeling Now would be released on 15 May of that year, and that "Party 4 U" would be included on the album. She described the final version of the song as "euphoric and sad at the same time". This contrasts with earlier versions of the track, which Angus Truskett from ABC Australia described as more uptempo with EDM trap-style beat drops. Atlantic Records released the album to critical acclaim; "Party 4 U" is the ninth track. It was originally intended to serve as the closing track.

== Music and lyrics ==
"Party 4 U"
A sample of "Party 4 U", featuring rapidly pulsing synths and minimalistic, crescendoing beats

"Party 4 U" is four minutes and fifty-six seconds long. It is a pop, hyperpop, and electronic pop song, featuring crescendoing beats, Auto-Tuned vocals, and a "dreamy" atmosphere. The second verse showcases a fast-paced rhythm. Near the end of "Party 4 U", the song features a glitch effect as Charli XCX sings "party on-party on you, party on you" repeatedly over minimalistic beats and rapidly pulsing synths. The song's outro features crowd noises that were recorded at the end of Charli XCX's 2019 Brixton Academy concert in London during the Charli Live Tour (2019-2020). She revealed that "Party 4 U" was not selected as the album's closing track because she thought that it was "too traditional" due to the outro's crowd noises sounding "like an emotional goodbye".

Charli XCX described "Party 4 U" as being about "throwing a party for someone who doesn't come—the yearning to see someone but they're not there". The song's party-inspired lyrical imagery includes pink balloons, purple pills, a pool, and a "DJ with your favorite tunes". Paste's Andy Steiner wrote that the lyrics describe a narrator who feels lonely despite being surrounded by crowds. Cosmopolitan's Samantha Olson viewed the second verse as reflecting the narrator's sadness over her lover's absence at the party and an emotional disconnect between them, while the bridge conveys the anxiety of realising that their relationship has come to a conclusion. Charli XCX sings in the final verse, "I wish you'd get here, kiss my face/ Instead you're somewhere far away/ My nervous energy will stay/ I hope you realize one day".

== Critical reception ==
Critics generally praised "Party 4 U" for its composition and Charli XCX's vocal performance. Truskett described the song as a "shimmering, slow-burn anthem drenched in yearning and euphoria". Atwood Magazine's Danielle Holian praised the production and lyrics, adding that the song features Charli XCX "at her most restrained, and somehow, her most cutting, sonically." Business Insider's Callie Ahlgrim lauded Charli XCX's vocal control, tone, and how "her voice melt[s] into the larger soundscape without getting lost in it"; in 2020, she considered it one of her best songs. Courtney Larocca from the same publication commended Charli XCX's vocals and the song's "warm and fuzzy" atmosphere. Both Ahlgrim and Larocca considered "Party 4 U" one of How I'm Feeling Now's best tracks. Consequence's editorial staff similarly regarded it as one of the album's essential tracks. Steiner wrote that "Party 4 U" contained some of Charli XCX's most intricate songwriting, considering it the fourth-best track in her discography in 2023.

== Resurgence and commercial performance ==
"Party 4 U" began to resurge in popularity and streaming in February 2025 after going viral on the online video platform TikTok, where users posted videos of themselves singing the song's second verse. As a result of the resurgence, US on-demand streams for "Party 4 U" more than doubled from January to February 2025, according to Luminate Data. On 19 February, the track entered the US Spotify Viral 100 chart at number 80, marking the highest new entry. In response, Charli XCX tweeted, "It's p[retty] crazy that this song is suddenly getting love in this kinda way. I know this song means so much to so many [fans]". A new TikTok trend began in April 2025, where users shared their feelings and interpretations on the repeated "party on you" part of the track. Atlantic Records released "Party 4 U" as a single to contemporary hit radio in the United States on 13 May 2025. A 7-inch vinyl of the song, featuring an etched B-side, was released on 18 April 2026, as part of Record Store Day.

"Party 4 U" peaked at number 42 on the Billboard Global 200 chart dated 31 May 2025. It reached the national charts of Ireland (8), Singapore (12), the United Kingdom (19), Australia (25), Canada (46), and the United States (55). The track also peaked at number 7 on the Sweden Heatseeker chart, number 13 on Billboard's Philippines Hot 100 chart, number 14 on IFPI's Official Philippines Chart, number 17 on the Malaysia International chart, number 71 on the Lithuania Airplay chart, number 88 on the Greece International chart, and number 121 on the Portuguese Singles Chart. "Party 4 U" received platinum certifications in Canada from Music Canada and in New Zealand from Recorded Music NZ, as well as a gold certification in the United Kingdom from the British Phonographic Industry.

== Music video ==
On 14 May 2025, Charli XCX shared a clip of herself running down an empty street while holding pink balloons and announced that the music video for "Party 4 U" would be released the next day, coinciding with the fifth anniversary of How I'm Feeling Now's release. The video was directed by Mitch Ryan, based on an original concept by Charli XCX. The video begins with Charli XCX in a polka dot dress inside a house on the morning after a party, where balloons and an abandoned birthday cake are shown. Charli XCX picks up her bag and walks barefoot along a rural road, before emptying the bag and smoking a cigarette. She removes her dress and continues walking in a white bra and underwear. Upon encountering a billboard of herself, she tears it apart, throws black paint over it, and sets it on fire. The video is intercut with close-up shots of Charli XCX's face.

Vulture's Jason P. Frank described the video as "evocative", while Olson deemed it "stunningly vulnerable". Holian praised the video's novelty and compared it to a "time capsule cracked open at just the right moment." Slant Magazine listed it as the second-best music video of 2025, with Sal Cinquemani adding that it demonstrated both the song's "timelessness" and changing strategies for releasing and marketing songs and music videos. Dazed listed the video as the eighth-best music video of 2025, while Spin picked it as the twentieth-best. The music video was nominated for Best Pop Video – UK at the 2025 UK Music Video Awards.

== Live performances and other usage ==
In 2021, Charli XCX performed "Party 4 U" at three live shows in support of How I'm Feeling Now, located in Los Angeles, New York City, and London. She later included the track in the set list of her third solo concert tour, Crash: The Live Tour (2022–2023). Charli XCX performed "Party 4 U" at her Boiler Room set in New York City in February 2024. The official footage of the performance was released the following month. She played the song at BBC Radio 1's Big Weekend festival in Luton in May 2024. The following month, she also performed it at the Primavera Sound 2024 festival in Barcelona. Charli XCX added "Party 4 U" to the set list of her fourth solo concert tour, the Brat Tour (2024–2025). She also included the song in the set list of her fifth solo concert tour, the Music, Fashion, Film Tour (2026-2027).

"Party 4 U" was featured in the final scene of the film Bottoms (2023). Atwood Magazine's Julia Dzurillay deemed it a "seamless inclusion to a film for and about the LGBTQ community". The track was also featured at the end of the fourth episode of the television series Overcompensating (2025). Benito Skinner, the series creator, described "Party 4 U" as the "song that sums up Overcompensating".

== Personnel ==
Credits are adapted from the liner notes of How I'm Feeling Now.

- Charli XCX – songwriter, recording engineer, engineer, vocals, background vocals
- A. G. Cook – songwriter, producer, engineer, drum programmer, synthesisers, background vocals
- Stuart Hawkes – mastering engineer
- Geoff Swan – mixing engineer
- Niko Battistini – assistant mixing engineer

== Charts ==
=== Weekly charts ===
Weekly chart performance for "Party 4 U"
Chart (2025–2026)	Peak position
Australia (ARIA)	25
Canada Hot 100 (Billboard)	46
Canada CHR/Top 40 (Billboard)	17
Croatian International Albums (HDU) 7-inch vinyl	18
Global 200 (Billboard)	42
Greece International (IFPI)	88
Ireland (IRMA)	8
Lithuania Airplay (TopHit)	71
Malaysia International (RIM)	17
New Zealand Catalogue Singles (RMNZ)	6
Philippines (IFPI)	14
Philippines (Philippines Hot 100)	13
Portugal (AFP)	121
Singapore (RIAS)	12
Sweden Heatseeker (Sverigetopplistan)	7
UK Singles (Official Charts)	19
US Billboard Hot 100	55
US Adult Pop Airplay (Billboard)	40
US Pop Airplay (Billboard)	12

=== Year-end charts ===
Year-end chart performance for "Party 4 U"
Chart (2025)	Position
Canada (Canadian Hot 100)	86
Canada CHR/Top 40 (Billboard)	55
Global 200 (Billboard)	193
Philippines (Philippines Hot 100)	42
US Pop Airplay (Billboard)	46

== Certifications ==
Certifications for "Party 4 U"
Region	Certification	Certified units/sales
Canada (Music Canada)	Platinum	80,000^{‡}
New Zealand (RMNZ)	Platinum	30,000^{‡}
United Kingdom (BPI)	Gold	400,000^{‡}
^{‡} Sales+streaming figures based on certification alone.

== Release history ==
Release dates and formats for "Party 4 U"
Region	Date	Format(s)	Label	Ref.
United States	13 May 2025	Contemporary hit radio	Atlantic	
Various	18 April 2026	7-inch vinyl	Atlantic	
