= SS26 (song) =

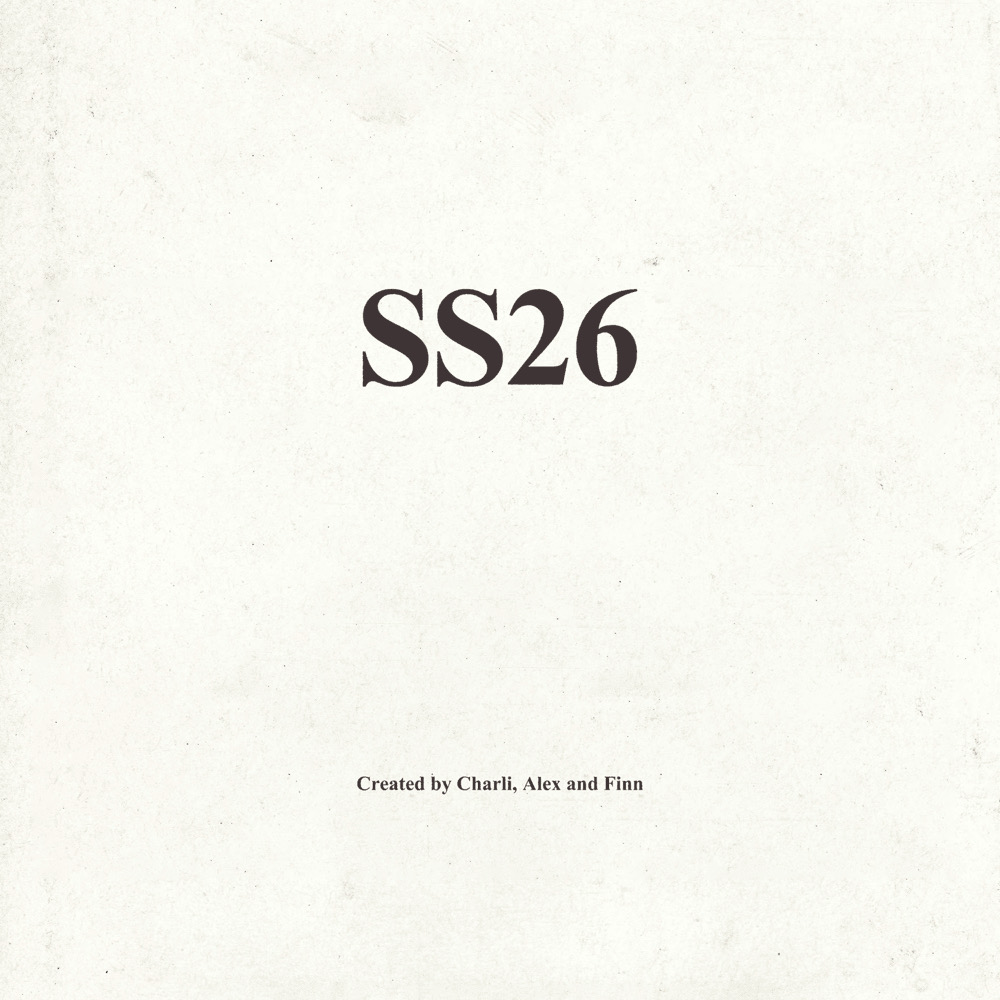

Single by Charli XCX

from the album Music, Fashion, Film
- B-side: "Playboy Bunny"
- Released: 21 May 2026
- Genre: Pop
- Length: 2:48
- Label: Atlantic
- Songwriters: Alexander Guy Cook; Charlotte Aitchison; Finn Keane
- Producers: A. G. Cook; Finn Keane

Charli XCX singles chronology
"Rock Music" (2026)	"SS26" (2026)	"Wink Wink" (2026)

Music video
- "SS26" on YouTube

"SS26" (acronym for "Spring, Summer 2026") is a song by British singer and songwriter Charli XCX. It was released on 21 May 2026, through Atlantic Records, as the second single from her eighth studio album, Music, Fashion, Film. A pop song inspired by rock music, combining dark and dance elements, she wrote it with Alexander Guy Cook and Finn Keane, who also produced the track. It reached number forty three on the UK Singles Charts.

== Background and promotion ==
Charli XCX's preceding single, "Rock Music", sparked some controversy. Addressing the reaction, she described the song as simultaneously "funny, earnest, sincere, and joyful", later adding that she was "not trying to repel people away or convince people into liking me". During this period, she also released the B-side "I Keep on Thinking Bout You Every Single Day and Night". Shortly before the song's release, she shared footage from recording sessions in Paris alongside her collaborators, A.G. Cook and Finn Keane. Charli XCX teased "SS26" through a post on her Substack, sharing part of the song's lyrics.

During the Music, Fashion, Film interview with Nicky Reardon, Charli XCX discussed the song's meaning, saying: "It's funny. I think everybody thinks that that song is about the end of the world or something. Or the state of the world... It's actually not. That's not at all what that song is about. It's kind of about persona, in a way. It's about how I think now, more than ever - we, as in all of us, anyone who is kind of on the internet, not even necessarily putting out music or work in any kind of way, but just if you're on the internet - there is this sort of level of persona... this level of feeling like you need to be on the right side of every single conversation and not get things wrong and apologize for things, how big or small, that you've done... to ultimately lead you towards some kind of moral sanctuary that will still not actually ever be enough... So the song is actually kind of talking about my experience with that. And talking about all of the sort of things that I could maybe utilize to help me to be more morally 'pure', which would be, like, stop smoking cigarettes..."

== Composition ==
"SS26" has been described as a pop song. It was mainly inspired by rock music, opening with "simple guitar lines" and subdued electronic drum sounds before shifting into a more distorted sound with "subtle, bouncing synths", according to Tom Skinner of NME. Combining dark themes and dance elements, it references online backlash and cancel culture through lines such as "I was hacked, it got taken out of context, obviously".

== Music video ==
Prior to the music video's release, Charli XCX livestreamed a 30-minute "Pre Show" on YouTube, where she tried on outfits and highlighted pieces from designers she had recently worn publicly. The music video for "SS26" was released along with the single's release. Directed by Torso, the music video depicts Charli XCX walking through Paris fashion runways in a series of designer looks and features cameos from a number of fashion personalities including Carine Roitfeld, Anthony Vaccarello, Farida Khelfa, and Lucien Pagès.

== Critical reception ==
Anthony Fantano labeled "SS26" as one of the best releases of the week. He praised its lyrics and refrain, while criticizing its lack of a climax and minimal use of bass guitar and drums.

== Charts ==
=== Weekly charts ===
Weekly chart performance
Chart (2026)	Peak position
Estonia Airplay (TopHit)	81
Guatemala Anglo Airplay (Monitor Latino)	15
Ireland (IRMA)	75
Japan Hot Overseas (Billboard Japan)	19
New Zealand Hot Singles (RMNZ)	2
UK Singles (Official Charts)	43
US Bubbling Under Hot 100 (Billboard)	3
US Hot Rock & Alternative Songs (Billboard)	43

=== Monthly charts ===
Monthly chart performance
Chart (2026)	Peak position
Estonia Airplay (TopHit)	90

== Release history ==
Release dates and formats
Region	Date	Format	Label	Ref.
Various	21 May 2026	Digital download; streaming	Atlantic	
Various	23 May 2026	7-inch single	Atlantic	
