= Rock Music (song) =

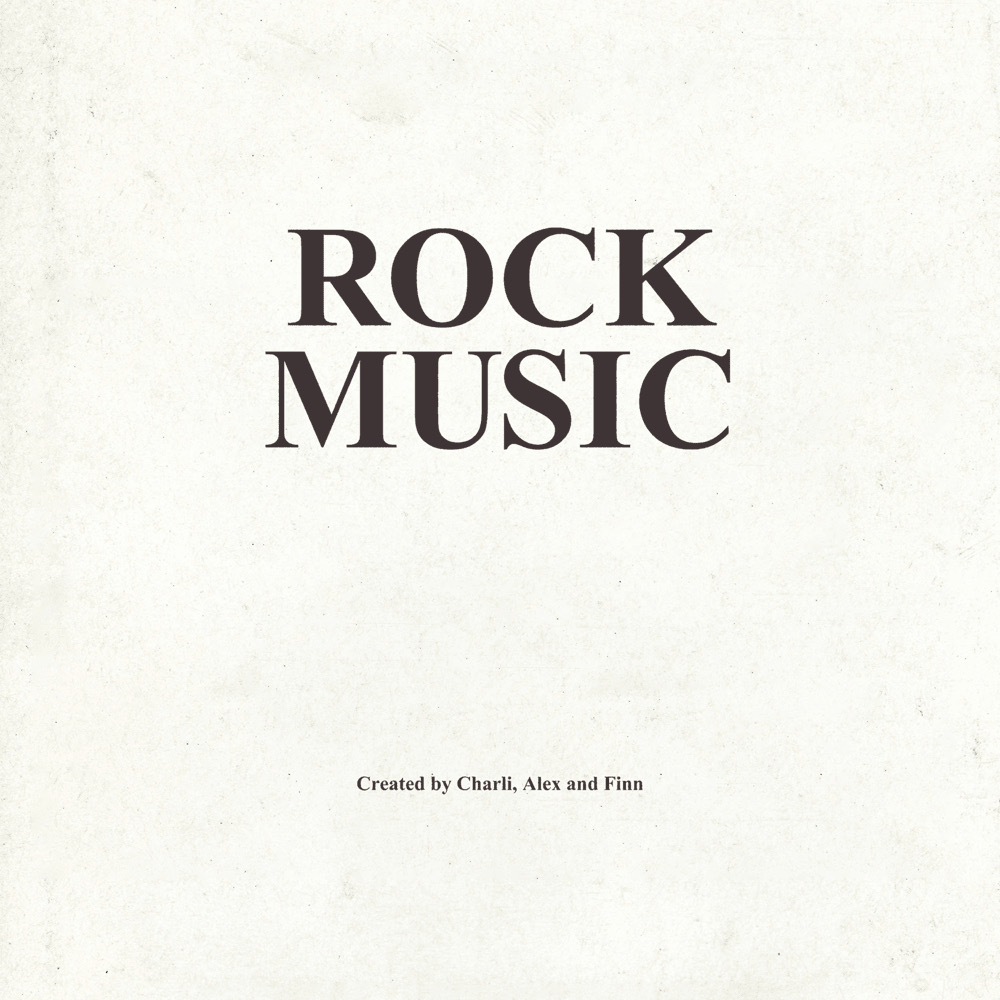

Single by Charli XCX

from the album Music, Fashion, Film
- B-side: "I Keep On Thinking Bout You Every Single Day and Night"
- Released: 8 May 2026
- Recorded: October 2025
- Studio: Rue Boyer (Paris)
- Genre: Hyperpop
- Length: 1:55
- Label: Atlantic
- Songwriters: Alexander Guy Cook; Charlotte Aitchison; Finn Keane
- Producers: A. G. Cook; Finn Keane

Charli XCX singles chronology
"Always Everywhere" (2026)	"Rock Music" (2026)	"SS26" (2026)

Music video
- "Rock Music" on YouTube

"Rock Music" is a song by British singer and songwriter Charli XCX. It was released on 8 May 2026, under exclusive license to Atlantic Records, as the lead single from her eighth studio album, Music, Fashion, Film. A hyperpop song, Charli XCX wrote the track along with its producers A. G. Cook and Finn Keane. It peaked at number 36 on the UK Singles Chart.

== Background and concept ==
In February 2026, Charli XCX released a companion record for Emerald Fennell's adaptation of Wuthering Heights (1847), which included contributions from John Cale and Sky Ferreira. During that time, she was also participating in multiple film productions, including Daniel Goldhaber's Faces of Death remake, Gregg Araki's I Want Your Sex, and the mockumentary, The Moment, in which she stars. She also released a 7" single for her song "Party 4 U", taken from her fourth studio album, How I'm Feeling Now (2020).

Charli first hinted at the project's direction in an April interview with British Vogue, which previewed the lyric "I think the dance floor is dead, so now we're making rock music." She explained that making another dance-oriented album "would have felt really hard, really sad," and said she was interested in expanding the possibilities of her musical perspective. Charli XCX later clarified on Instagram that she was not making a conventional rock album, sharing a studio clip and describing "Rock Music" as "not actually rock music". She explained that the song originated while she was staying in an apartment above a studio in Paris, and recalled waking up with an idea for the track that amused both her and her collaborators, leading them to create "Rock Music."

== Promotion ==
"A video of me making a song called 'rock music' that is not actually rock music which is funny because i never said i was making a rock album. love you xx"

— Charli XCX, talking about "Rock Music"

On 1 May, Charli XCX shared a video through Instagram, which featured the then unreleased song recorded in October 2025, at Rue Boyer Studios in Paris. In the post, she wrote: "It would be cool if we had a song that was called 'Rock Music'". The song features collaborations from A. G. Cook and Finn Keane who co-wrote and produced the song, and will be the lead single of her seventh studio album, Music, Fashion, Film. "Rock Music" was listed in BBC Radio 1's playlist on 8 May.

== Composition ==
Focusing on hyperpop production, "Rock Music" incorporates prominent distorted guitar instrumentation and Auto-Tune sounds, while maintaining the pop-oriented style characteristic of Charli XCX's work. Its lyrics continue her conversational and provocative approach, including references to nightlife, friendship, and self-aware humor. Despite its title and retro-styled guitar elements, "Rock Music" was described by Billboard as being closer in style to electronic acts such as French duo Daft Punk than to traditional rock music. However, Ethan Millman of The Hollywood Reporter believed the song was heavily influenced by rock music.

== Music video ==
The music video for "Rock Music" was teased a day before of the song's official release. Filmed in black-and-white, it was directed by Scottish filmmaker Aidan Zamiri, who also directed a music video of her 2024 single "Guess", and collaborated with her in The Moment. The music video opens with Charli XCX throwing a television set from a hotel window, incorporating imagery associated with rock music culture including smashed guitars, crowds headbanging, and piles of cigarettes. At the ending, it interrupts the song with a frozen image that is suddenly overtaken by a crowd bursting into a mosh pit.

Charli XCX stated that its music video was developed simultaneously with the song, explaining that "the song ideas informed the video, and the video ideas informed the song" during a making process. Her husband, George Daniel, makes a cameo and plays the drums.

== Reception ==
Professional ratings
Review scores
Source	Rating
The Guardian	4/5 stars

In a review for The Guardian, Alexis Petridis compared Charli XCX's deadpan vocal delivery with LCD Soundsystem's 2002 single "Losing My Edge" and described it as "funny, infernally catchy and chaotic". DIY's Sara Jamieson viewed the song as a stylistic shift away from the dancefloor-centered sound of Brat (2024) in favor of a rougher musical direction. Shaad D'Souza of Pitchfork interpreted "Rock Music" as both a playful provocation and a sincere artistic statement, and highlighted its distorted guitar chords and self-aware tone. The author also drew attention to lyrics encouraging risk-taking, such as "Maybe jump off the stage / I hope they catch you today / But if they don't, it's OK".

One of the lyrics, "I think the dancefloor is dead, so now we're making rock music", caused several controversies through online media. American singer Madonna, who released her fifteenth studio album, Confessions II, the same year, seemingly replied to the lyrics with the caption—"If your Dance floor feels dead / Maybe you're playing the wrong music". Charli XCX later addressed its reactions, stating: "I'm not gonna explain where I was coming from with 'Rock Music' but all I know is that things can be funny, earnest, sincere, and joyful all at the same time." She concluded that she was "not trying to repel people away" from the song.

== Charts ==
Chart performance
Chart (2026)	Peak position
Canada Hot 100 (Billboard)	95
Ireland (IRMA)	55
Japan Hot Overseas (Billboard Japan)	14
New Zealand Hot Singles (RMNZ)	4
UK Singles (Official Charts)	36
US Billboard Hot 100	86
US Hot Rock & Alternative Songs (Billboard)	26

== Release history ==
Release dates and formats
Region	Date	Format	Label	Ref.
Various	8 May 2026	7-inch single; digital download; streaming	Atlantic	
Italy	8 May 2026	Radio airplay	Warner	
