= Charli XCX discography =

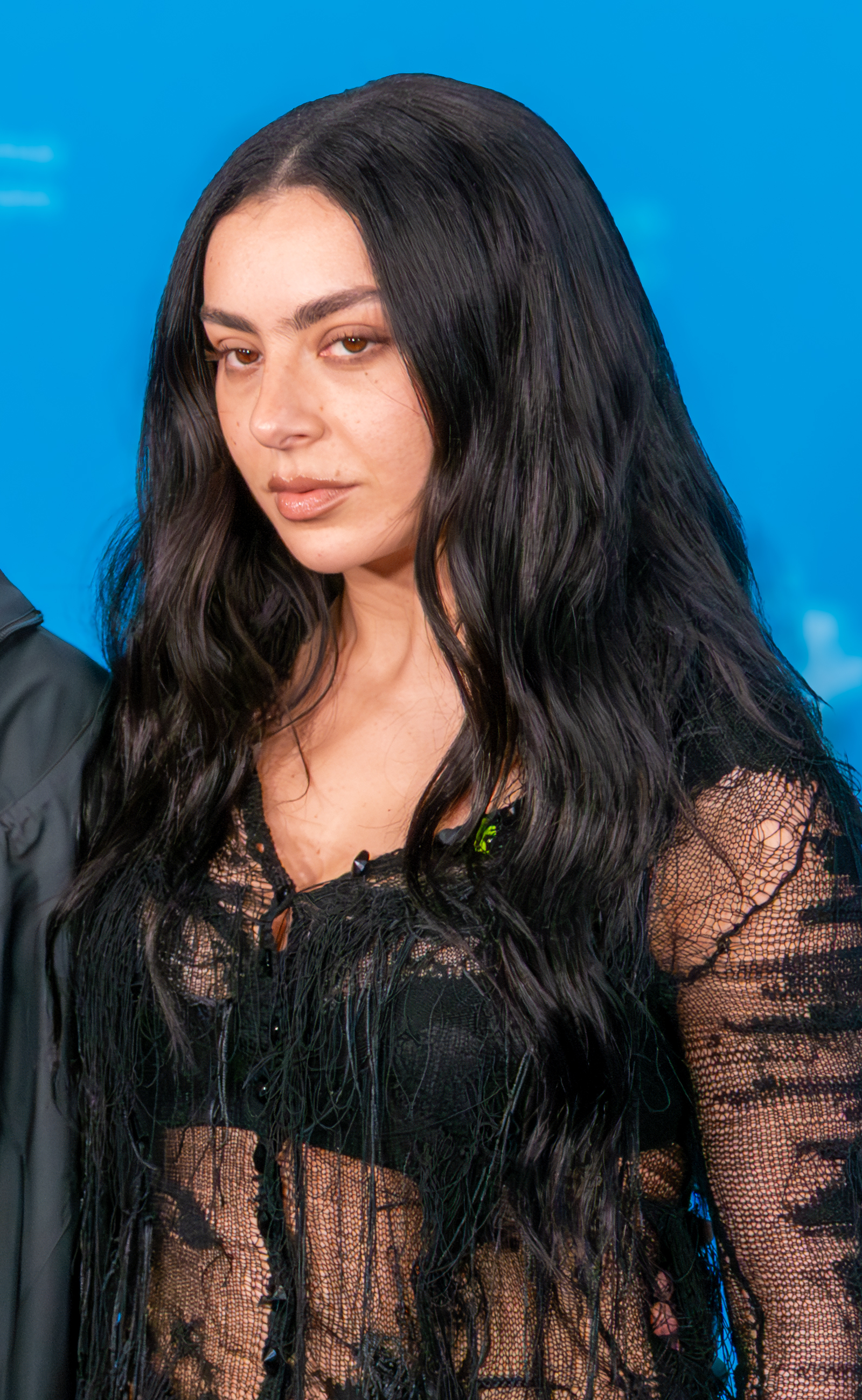
- Charli XCX in 2026
- Studio albums: 8
- EPs: 3
- Soundtrack albums: 2
- Live albums: 1
- Compilation albums: 1
- Singles: 70
- Music videos: 48
- Promotional singles: 24
- Mixtapes: 4
- Remix: 1
- DJ mix albums: 2

British singer Charli XCX has released eight studio albums (or nine including her limited-circulation debut 14), four mixtapes, three extended plays, one live album, two soundtrack albums, one remix album, two DJ mixes, 70 singles (18 as a featured artist), 24 promotional singles, and 48 music videos. In 2007, Charli XCX began recording her debut album on a loan granted by her parents. Titled 14, after her age at the time, it received only a restricted public release. Two singles, "!Franchesckaar!" and double A-side "Emelline" / "Art Bitch", were released under Orgy Music towards the end of 2008. In June 2012, Charli XCX released her first mixtape, titled Heartbreaks and Earthquakes, a one-track file comprising eight songs. Her second mixtape, titled Super Ultra, was released in November of the same year. Charli XCX's major-label debut album, True Romance, was released in April 2013, and peaked at number 85 on the UK Albums Chart. While failing to appear on any main album charts internationally, the album reached number five on the Heatseekers Albums chart in the United States and number 11 on the ARIA Hitseekers chart in Australia. The album spawned five singles with "Stay Away", "Nuclear Seasons", "You're the One", "You (Ha Ha Ha)", and "What I Like". In 2012, Charli XCX was featured on Icona Pop's "I Love It", which peaked at number one in the UK and reached the top 10 in various countries, including the US, Ireland, Canada, and Germany.

"SuperLove" was released as a stand-alone single in December 2013, peaking at number 62 on the UK Singles Chart. In 2014, Charli XCX released the single "Boom Clap" for the soundtrack to the film The Fault in Our Stars. The song was an international success, peaking at number six on the UK Singles Chart, number eight on the US Billboard Hot 100 and reaching the top 10 in Australia, Canada, and New Zealand. "Boom Clap" was later included on Charli XCX's second album, Sucker, released in December 2014. The album charted at number 15 in her native UK, number 28 in the United States, and entered the top 50 in several other countries including Austria, Saudi Arabia, Singapore, Belgium, France, Ireland, and Switzerland. Sucker also spawned the top-40 UK single "Break the Rules" and the top-10 UK single "Doing It" featuring British singer Rita Ora. Also in 2014, Charli XCX was featured on Iggy Azalea's "Fancy", which topped the US Billboard Hot 100 and charted in the top 10 in several countries including the UK, Canada, Ireland, and Australia.

In 2016, Charli XCX released the Vroom Vroom EP, which, while not a commercial success, signalled a move for the singer into more experimental electronic territory. In promotion of her third studio album (dubbed by fans as "XCX World"), she released the top-40 hits "After the Afterparty" and "Boys". After the album leaked, however, the project was scrapped. In 2017, Charli XCX released two more experimental mixtapes, Number 1 Angel, and Pop 2, both of which received critical acclaim.

In September 2019, she released her third album Charli, which debuted at number 14 in the United Kingdom, number 42 in the United States, and entered the top 50 in Australia, Canada, Ireland, New Zealand, and Spain. The album's lead single "1999" peaked at number 13 in the UK. She followed up Charli with How I'm Feeling Now, an album recorded in six weeks during the COVID-19 lockdowns in 2020. The album debuted at number 33 in the UK and received critical acclaim.

Charli XCX released her fifth album Crash in March 2022, her last album with Asylum, before ultimately renewing her contract in 2023 with Atlantic. Crash became her most commercially successful album to that point, topping the charts in the UK, Australia, and Ireland, and becoming her first top 20 in the United States, Belgium, and Germany. It also spawned the top-40 single "Beg for You".

In June 2024, Charli XCX released her sixth album, Brat, with Atlantic; it was well received both critically and commercially, becoming her most successful album to date within just a month of its release. Brat peaked at number one in the UK, Australia, Croatia, Ireland, and New Zealand, and reached the top ten in 14 other countries, including the United States, where it marked Charli XCX’s highest debut on the Billboard 200 at number three.

Wuthering Heights is Charli XCX's second soundtrack album and seventh studio album. Created for the film Wuthering Heights (2026), it was released on 13 February 2026 by Atlantic Records, the same day as the film's theatrical release. The album's lead single, "House" featuring the Welsh musician John Cale, was released on 10 November 2025. Wuthering Heights spawned three further singles: "Chains of Love" on 13 November 2025, "Wall of Sound" on 16 January 2026 and "Always Everywhere" on the same day as the album.

Charli XCX officially announced her eighth album, Music, Fashion, Film on 1 June 2026. The album was released on 24 July 2026. "Rock Music", the album's lead single, was released on 8 May 2026. "SS26" was released on 27 May 2026 as the second single off the album, "Wink Wink" on 26 June 2026 as the third, and "Camera" on 21 July 2026 as the fourth.

== Albums ==
=== Studio albums ===
List of studio albums, with selected details, chart positions, sales, and certifications
Title	Album details	Peak chart positions										Sales	Certifications
Title	Album details	UK	AUS	AUT	CAN	FRA	GER	IRE	NZ	SWI	US	Sales	Certifications
True Romance	Released: 12 April 2013; Label: Asylum, Atlantic; Formats: CD, LP, digital download, streaming	85	— (Note: "True Romance" did not enter the ARIA Albums Chart, but peaked at number 11 on the ARIA Hitseeker Albums chart.)	—	—	—	—	—	—	—	— (Note: "True Romance" did not enter the Billboard 200 chart, but peaked at number five on the Heatseekers Albums chart.)	UK: 6,302; US: 12,000	
Sucker	Released: 15 December 2014; Label: Asylum, Atlantic; Formats: CD, LP, digital download, streaming	15	53	44	—	42	57	17	—	33	28	UK: 50,804; US: 28,907	BPI: Silver
Charli	Released: 13 September 2019; Label: Asylum, Atlantic; Formats: CD, LP, digital download, streaming	14	7	73	50	92	91	21	26	54	42	UK: 31,359; US: 13,200	
How I'm Feeling Now	Released: 15 May 2020; Label: Asylum, Atlantic; Formats: CD, LP, digital download, streaming	33	37	—	—	—	100	27	40	—	85	UK: 15,960	
Crash	Released: 18 March 2022; Label: Asylum, Atlantic; Formats: CD, LP, digital download, streaming, cassette	1	1	9	16	53	19	1	2	19	7	UK: 80,600; US: 19,000	BPI: Silver
Brat	Released: 7 June 2024; Label: Atlantic; Formats: CD, LP, digital download, streaming, cassette	1	1	7	2	16	5	1	4	7	3	UK: 608,992	BPI: 2× Platinum; ARIA: Gold; BVMI: Gold; IFPI AUT: Gold; MC: 2× Platinum; RMNZ: 2× Platinum; SNEP: Platinum
Music, Fashion, Film	Released: 24 July 2026; Label: Atlantic; Formats: CD, LP, digital download, streaming, cassette	1	1	4	6	15	6	3	1	3	3	UK: 22,322	
"—" denotes a recording that did not chart or was not released in that territory.

=== Remix albums ===
List of remix albums with selected details, certifications and peak chart positions
Title	Album details	Peak chart positions								Sales	Certifications
Title	Album details	UK	DEN	FIN	LIT	NOR	NZ	SWE	US Dance	Sales	Certifications
Brat and It's Completely Different but Also Still Brat (Note: In most territories, including Australia, the United States, and originally the United Kingdom, the chart data for Brat and It's Completely Different but Also Still Brat was combined with that of Brat, causing it to chart under the latter title.)	Released: 11 October 2024; Labels: Atlantic; Formats: CD, LP, digital download, streaming, cassette	40	10	28	19	5	1	19	5	UK: 7,289	IFPI DEN: Gold; RMNZ: Platinum

=== Live albums ===
List of live albums, with selected details
Title	Album details
Live from Austin (Note: Originally released as Live at Emo's.)	Released: 10 July 2020; Label: Warner, Asylum; Format: Digital download, streaming

=== DJ mix albums ===
List of DJ mix albums, with selected details
Title	Album details
Boiler Room: Charli XCX, How I'm Feeling Now, May 2020 (DJ Mix)	Released: 25 September 2020; Label: Warner, Asylum; Format: Streaming
NYE 2022	Released: 23 December 2021; Label: Warner, Asylum; Format: Streaming

=== Compilation albums ===
List of compilation albums, with selected details
Title	Album details
Number 1 Angel / Pop 2	Released: 20 April 2018; Label: Asylum, Atlantic; Format: LP

=== Mixtapes ===
List of mixtapes, with selected details and chart positions
Title	Mixtape details	Peak chart positions						
Title	Mixtape details	UK	AUS	CAN	GER	NZ Heat.	SCO	US
Heartbreaks and Earthquakes	Released: 12 June 2012; Format: Digital download, streaming	—	—	—	—	—	—	—
Super Ultra	Released: 7 November 2012; Format: Digital download, streaming	—	—	—	—	—	—	—
Number 1 Angel	Released: 10 March 2017; Formats: Digital download, LP, cassette, streaming; Label: Asylum	37	74	67	—	6	7	175
Pop 2	Released: 15 December 2017; Formats: LP, digital download, cassette, streaming; Label: Asylum	—	—	—	78	—	6	—
"—" denotes a recording that did not chart or was not released in that territory.

=== Soundtrack albums ===
List of soundtrack albums, with selected details and peak chart positions
Title	Album details	Peak chart positions										Sales
Title	Album details	UK	AUS	AUT	CAN	FRA	GER	IRE	NZ	SWI	US	Sales
Bottoms (Original Motion Picture Score) (with Leo Birenberg)	Released: 25 August 2023; Format: CD, digital download, streaming; Label: Milan	—	—	—	—	—	—	—	—	—	—	
Wuthering Heights	Released: 13 February 2026; Format: CD, LP, digital download, streaming, cassette; Label: Atlantic	1	4	2	14	19	5	4	4	2	8	UK: 21,071
"—" denotes a recording that did not chart or was not released in that territory.

== Extended plays ==
List of extended plays, with selected details and chart positions
Title	EP details	Peaks
Title	EP details	US Dance
iTunes Festival: London 2012	Released: 10 September 2012; Format: Digital download, streaming; Label: Warner	—
Spotify Sessions	Released: 5 June 2015; Format: Streaming; Label: Atlantic	—
Vroom Vroom	Released: 26 February 2016; Format: Digital download, LP, streaming; Label: Vroom Vroom	2
"—" denotes a recording that did not chart or was not released in that territory.

== Singles ==
=== As lead artist ===
List of singles as lead artist, with selected chart positions and certifications, showing year released and album name
Title	Year	Peak chart positions										Certifications	Album
Title	Year	UK	AUS	AUT	CAN	FRA	GER	IRE	NZ	SWI	US	Certifications	Album
"!Franchesckaar!"	2008	—	—	—	—	—	—	—	—	—	—		14
"Emelline" / "Art Bitch"	2008	— (Note: "Emelline" / "Art Bitch" did not chart on the UK Singles Chart, but peaked at number 14 on the UK Independent Singles Chart.)	—	—	—	—	—	—	—	—	—		Non-album single
"Stay Away"	2011	—	—	—	—	—	—	—	—	—	—		True Romance
"End of the World" (with Alex Metric)	2011	—	—	—	—	—	—	—	—	—	—		Open Your Eyes
"Nuclear Seasons"	2011	—	—	—	—	—	—	—	—	—	—		True Romance
"You're the One"	2012	—	—	—	—	—	—	—	—	—	—		True Romance
"You (Ha Ha Ha)"	2013	—	—	—	—	—	—	—	—	—	—		True Romance
"What I Like"	2013	—	—	—	—	—	—	—	—	—	—		True Romance
"SuperLove"	2013	62	—	—	—	—	—	—	—	—	—		Non-album single
"Boom Clap"	2014	6	9	26	8	15	36	8	7	33	8	BPI: Platinum; ARIA: 2× Platinum; BVMI: Gold; MC: 3× Platinum; RIAA: 3× Platinum; RMNZ: Platinum	The Fault in Our Stars (Music from the Motion Picture) and Sucker
"Break the Rules"	2014	35	10	6	69	13	4	46	31	13	91	BPI: Silver; ARIA: Platinum; BVMI: Gold; MC: Gold; RIAA: Gold; RMNZ: Gold	Sucker
"Doing It" (featuring Rita Ora)	2015	8	68	—	—	165	—	23	—	—	—	BPI: Silver	Sucker
"Famous"	2015	176	75	—	—	—	—	—	—	—	—		Sucker
"After the Afterparty" (featuring Lil Yachty)	2016	29	30	—	—	—	—	44	— (Note: "After the Afterparty" did not enter the NZ Top 40 Singles Chart, but peaked at number seven on the NZ Heatseekers Singles Chart.)	—	— (Note: "After the Afterparty" did not enter the Billboard Hot 100, but peaked at number 36 on the Pop Digital Song Sales chart.)	BPI: Gold; ARIA: Platinum	Non-album singles
"Boys"	2017	31	60	—	60	159	—	55	— (Note: "Boys" did not enter the NZ Top 40 Singles Chart, but peaked at number one on the NZ Heatseeker Singles Chart.)	—	— (Note: "Boys" did not enter the Billboard Hot 100, but peaked at number 10 on the Bubbling Under Hot 100 chart.)	BPI: Silver; MC: Gold; RIAA: Gold; RMNZ: Gold	Non-album singles
"Out of My Head" (featuring Tove Lo and Alma)	2017	—	—	—	—	—	—	—	— (Note: "Out of My Head" did not enter the NZ Top 40 Singles Chart, but peaked at number six on the NZ Heatseeker Singles Chart.)	—	—		Pop 2
"5 in the Morning"	2018	—	—	—	—	—	—	—	— (Note: "5 in the Morning" did not enter the NZ Top 40 Singles Chart, but peaked at number seven on the NZ Heatseeker Singles Chart.)	—	—		Non-album singles
"Focus" / "No Angel"	2018	—	—	—	—	—	—	—	— (Note: "Focus" did not enter the NZ Top 40 Singles Chart, but peaked at number 32 on the NZ Hot Singles Chart.)	—	—		Non-album singles
"Girls Night Out"	2018	—	—	—	—	—	—	—	—	—	—		Non-album singles
"1999" (with Troye Sivan)	2018	13	18	—	—	—	—	28	— (Note: "1999" did not enter the NZ Top 40 Singles Chart, but peaked at number 10 on the NZ Hot Singles Chart.)	—	— (Note: "1999" did not enter the Billboard Hot 100, but peaked at number 23 on the Pop Digital Song Sales chart.)	BPI: Platinum; ARIA: 2× Platinum; RMNZ: Platinum	Charli
"Blame It on Your Love" (featuring Lizzo)	2019	70	—	—	—	—	—	67	— (Note: "Blame It on Your Love" did not enter the NZ Top 40 Singles Chart, but peaked at number 16 on the NZ Hot Singles Chart.)	—	—	MC: Gold	Charli
"Dream Glow" (with BTS)	2019	61	77	—	— (Note: "Dream Glow" did not enter the Billboard Canadian Hot 100, but peaked at number 17 on the Hot Canadian Digital Song Sales chart.)	—	—	63	— (Note: "Dream Glow" did not enter the NZ Top 40 Singles Chart, but peaked at number seven on the NZ Hot Singles Chart.)	89	— (Note: "Dream Glow" did not enter the Billboard Hot 100, but peaked at number six on the Bubbling Under Hot 100 chart.)		BTS World: Original Soundtrack
"Gone" (with Christine and the Queens)	2019	58	—	—	— (Note: "Gone" did not enter the Billboard Canadian Hot 100, but peaked at number 50 on the Hot Canadian Digital Song Sales chart.)	—	—	56	— (Note: "Gone" did not enter the NZ Top 40 Singles Chart, but peaked at number 10 on the NZ Hot Singles Chart.)	—	—		Charli
"Bricks" (with Tommy Genesis)	2019	—	—	—	—	—	—	—	—	—	—		Non-album single
"Forever"	2020	—	—	—	—	—	—	—	— (Note: "Forever" did not enter the NZ Top 40 Singles Chart, but peaked at number 38 on the NZ Hot Singles Chart.)	—	—		How I'm Feeling Now
"Claws"	2020	—	—	—	—	—	—	—	— (Note: "Claws" did not enter the NZ Top 40 Singles Chart, but peaked at number 25 on the NZ Hot Singles Chart.)	—	—		How I'm Feeling Now
"I Finally Understand"	2020	—	—	—	—	—	—	—	—	—	—		How I'm Feeling Now
"Spinning" (with No Rome and the 1975)	2021	94	—	—	—	—	—	81	— (Note: "Spinning" did not enter the NZ Top 40 Singles Chart, but peaked at number 38 on the NZ Hot Singles Chart.)	—	—		Non-album single
"Xcxoplex" (with A. G. Cook)	2021	—	—	—	—	—	—	—	—	—	—		Apple vs. 7G
"Good Ones"	2021	44	94	—	—	—	—	32	— (Note: "Good Ones" did not enter the NZ Top 40 Singles Chart, but peaked at number nine on the NZ Hot Singles Chart.)	—	—	BPI: Silver; MC: Gold	Crash
"New Shapes" (featuring Christine and the Queens and Caroline Polachek)	2021	— (Note: "New Shapes" did not chart on the UK Singles Chart, but peaked at number 100 on the Official Singles Midweek Chart 100)	—	—	—	—	—	90	— (Note: "New Shapes" did not enter the NZ Top 40 Singles Chart, but peaked at number 39 on the NZ Hot Singles Chart.)	—	—		Crash
"Beg for You" (featuring Rina Sawayama)	2022	24	—	—	—	—	—	33	— (Note: "Beg for You" did not enter the NZ Top 40 Singles Chart, but peaked at number 10 on the NZ Hot Singles Chart.)	—	—	BPI: Silver; MC: Gold	Crash
"Baby"	2022	—	—	—	—	—	—	—	—	—	—		Crash
"Every Rule"	2022	—	—	—	—	—	—	—	—	—	—		Crash
"Used to Know Me"	2022	70	—	—	—	—	—	57	— (Note: "Used to Know Me" did not enter the NZ Top 40 Singles Chart, but peaked at number 20 on the NZ Hot Singles Chart.)	—	—		Crash
"Hot in It" (with Tiësto)	2022	24	—	—	81	—	76	27	— (Note: "Hot in It" did not enter the NZ Top 40 Singles Chart, but peaked at number eight on the NZ Hot Singles Chart.)	—	—	BPI: Gold; MC: Gold; RMNZ: Gold	Drive
"Hot Girl"	2022	—	—	—	—	—	—	—	—	—	—		Bodies Bodies Bodies
"Speed Drive"	2023	9	22	47	44	—	82	7	22	89	73	BPI: Gold; MC: Gold; RMNZ: Gold	Barbie the Album
"In the City" (with Sam Smith)	2023	41	—	—	—	—	—	47	— (Note: "In the City" did not enter the NZ Top 40 Singles Chart, but peaked at number eight on the NZ Hot Singles Chart.)	—	—		Non-album single
"Von Dutch"	2024	26	77	—	—	—	—	34	— (Note: "Von Dutch" did not enter the NZ Top 40 Singles Chart, but peaked at number six on the NZ Hot Singles Chart.)	—	— (Note: "Von Dutch" did not enter the Billboard Hot 100, but peaked at number 17 on the Bubbling Under Hot 100 chart.)	BPI: Platinum; ARIA: Gold; MC: 2× Platinum; RMNZ: Platinum; SNEP: Gold	Brat
"360"	2024	11	24	—	42	—	—	11	33	—	41	BPI: Platinum; ARIA: Platinum; MC: 2× Platinum; RMNZ: Platinum; SNEP: Gold	Brat
"Guess" (featuring Billie Eilish)	2024	1	1	3	9	53	14	1	1	5	12	BPI: Platinum; ARIA: Platinum; IFPI AUT: Gold; RMNZ: Gold; SNEP: Gold	Brat and It's Completely Different but Also Still Brat
"Apple"	2024	8	18	74	37	—	—	9	22	93	51	BPI: Platinum; ARIA: Gold; IFPI AUT: Gold; MC: Platinum; RMNZ: Platinum	Brat
"Talk Talk" (featuring Troye Sivan)	2024	24	42	—	66	—	—	30	— (Note: "Talk Talk" did not enter the NZ Top 40 Singles Chart, but peaked at number five on the NZ Hot Singles Chart.)	—	74	BPI: Silver	Brat and It's Completely Different But Also Still Brat
"Party 4 U"	2025	19	25	—	46	—	—	8	— (Note: "Party 4 U" did not enter the NZ Top 40 Singles Chart, but peaked at number six on the NZ Catalogue Singles Chart.)	—	55	BPI: Gold; MC: Platinum; RMNZ: Platinum	How I'm Feeling Now
"Everything Is Romantic" (featuring Caroline Polachek)	2025	—	—	—	—	—	—	—	— (Note: "Everything Is Romantic" did not enter the NZ Top 40 Singles Chart, but peaked at number 10 on the NZ Hot Singles Chart.)	—	— (Note: "Everything Is Romantic" did not enter the Billboard Hot 100, but peaked at number 25 on the Bubbling Under Hot 100 chart.)	BPI: Silver; RMNZ: Gold	Brat and It's Completely Different But Also Still Brat
"Chains of Love"	2025	12	55	—	72	—	—	15	— (Note: "Chains of Love" did not enter the NZ Top 40 Singles Chart, but peaked at number 4 on the NZ Hot Singles Chart.)	—	87	BPI: Silver	Wuthering Heights
"Rock Music"	2026	36	—	—	95	—	—	55	— (Note: "Rock Music" did not enter the NZ Top 40 Singles Chart, but peaked at number 4 on the NZ Hot Singles Chart.)	—	86		Music, Fashion, Film
"SS26"	2026	43	—	—	—	—	—	75	— (Note: "SS26" did not enter the NZ Top 40 Singles Chart, but peaked at number 2 on the NZ Hot Singles Chart.)	—	— (Note: "SS26" did not enter the Billboard Hot 100, but peaked at number 3 on the Bubbling Under Hot 100 chart.)		Music, Fashion, Film
"Wink Wink"	2026	57	—	—	—	—	—	67	— (Note: "Wink Wink" did not enter the NZ Top 40 Singles Chart, but it peaked at number 6 on the NZ Hot Singles Chart.)	—	— (Note: "Wink Wink" did not enter the Billboard Hot 100, but peaked at number 23 on the Bubbling Under Hot 100 chart.)		Music, Fashion, Film
"Camera"	2026	21	72	—	67	—	—	41	— (Note: "Camera" did not enter the NZ Top 40 Singles Chart, but peaked at number 4 on the NZ Hot 40 Singles Chart.)	—	75		Music, Fashion, Film
"Danceteria Afterhours" (with Madonna)	2026	22	— (Note: "Danceteria Afterhours" did not enter the Australian Singles Chart Top 100, but debuted at number 20 on the Australian Dance Singles Chart.)	—	—	—	—	—	— (Note: "Danceteria Afterhours" did not enter the NZ Top 40 Singles Chart, but peaked at number 14 on the NZ Hot 40 Singles Chart.)	—	—		Non-album single
"—" denotes a recording that did not chart or was not released in that territory.

=== As featured artist ===
List of singles as featured artist, with selected chart positions and certifications, showing year released and album name
Title	Year	Peak chart positions										Certifications	Album
Title	Year	UK	AUS	CAN	FRA	GER	IRE	NZ	SWE	SWI	US	Certifications	Album
"Lost in Space" (Starkey featuring Charli XCX)	2011	—	—	—	—	—	—	—	—	—	—		Space Traitor Vol. 2
"I Love It" (Icona Pop featuring Charli XCX)	2012	1	3	9	18	3	8	9	2	10	7	BPI: 3× Platinum; ARIA: 7× Platinum; BVMI: 3× Gold; GLF: Platinum; IFPI SWI: Platinum; MC: 3× Platinum; RIAA: 5× Platinum; RMNZ: 4× Platinum	Icona Pop and This Is... Icona Pop
"Illusions Of" (J£zus Million featuring Charli XCX)	2013	—	—	—	—	—	—	—	—	—	—		Double Denim Vol. 1
"Fancy" (Iggy Azalea featuring Charli XCX)	2014	5	5	1	21	51	12	1	23	52	1	BPI: Platinum; ARIA: 4× Platinum; BVMI: Gold; GLF: Platinum; MC: 3× Platinum; RIAA: 9× Platinum; RMNZ: 3× Platinum	The New Classic
"Drop That Kitty" (Ty Dolla Sign featuring Charli XCX and Tinashe)	2015	—	—	—	187	—	—	—	—	—	—		Non-album single
"Hand in the Fire" (Mr. Oizo featuring Charli XCX)	2015	—	—	—	124	—	—	—	—	—	—		All Wet
"Crazy Crazy" (Yasutaka Nakata featuring Charli XCX and Kyary Pamyu Pamyu)	2017	—	—	—	—	—	—	—	—	—	—		Digital Native
"1 Night" (Mura Masa featuring Charli XCX)	2017	—	—	—	—	—	—	—	—	—	—		Mura Masa
"Love Gang" (Whethan featuring Charli XCX)	2017	—	—	—	—	—	—	—	—	—	—		Non-album single
"Dirty Sexy Money" (David Guetta and Afrojack featuring Charli XCX and French Montana)	2017	35	18	90	22	46	41	26	82	52	—	BPI: Silver; ARIA: Platinum; RMNZ: Platinum; SNEP: Gold	7
"Girls" (Rita Ora featuring Cardi B, Bebe Rexha and Charli XCX)	2018	22	52	72	138	69	26	— (Note: "Girls" did not enter the NZ Top 40 Singles Chart, but peaked at number one on the NZ Heatseeker Singles Chart.)	66	54	— (Note: "Girls" did not enter the Billboard Hot 100, but peaked at number three on the Bubbling Under Hot 100 chart.)	BPI: Gold; ARIA: Gold; RMNZ: Gold	Phoenix
"Bitches" (Tove Lo featuring Charli XCX, Icona Pop, Elliphant and Alma)	2018	—	—	—	—	—	—	—	—	—	—		Blue Lips
"Spicy" (Herve Pagez and Diplo featuring Charli XCX)	2019	—	—	—	87	—	—	— (Note: "Spicy" did not enter the NZ Top 40 Singles Chart, but peaked at number 22 on the NZ Hot Singles Chart.)	—	—	—		Non-album single
"XXXTC" (Brooke Candy featuring Charli XCX and Maliibu Miitch)	2019	—	—	—	—	—	—	—	—	—	—		Sexorcism
"Flash Pose" (Pabllo Vittar featuring Charli XCX)	2019	—	—	—	—	—	—	—	—	—	—		111
"Ringtone" (Remix) (100 gecs featuring Charli XCX, Rico Nasty and Kero Kero Bonito)	2020	—	—	—	—	—	—	—	—	—	—		1000 Gecs and the Tree of Clues
"Drama" (Remix) (Bladee and Mechatok featuring Charli XCX)	2021	—	—	—	—	—	—	—	—	—	—		Good Luck (Deluxe Edition)
"Out Out" (Joel Corry and Jax Jones featuring Charli XCX and Saweetie)	2021	6	31	69	109	20	2	— (Note: "Out Out" did not enter the NZ Top 40 Singles Chart, but peaked at number 27 on the NZ Hot Singles Chart.)	88	32	—	BPI: Platinum; ARIA: Gold; BVMI: Gold; IFPI SWI: Platinum; MC: Platinum; RIAA: Gold; RMNZ: Platinum; SNEP: Gold	Another Friday Night
"—" denotes a recording that did not chart or was not released in that territory.

=== Promotional singles ===
Title	Year	Peak chart positions								Certifications	Album
Title	Year	AUS	CAN	IRE	NZ	SPA	US	US Dance	WW	Certifications	Album
"Cloud Aura" (featuring Brooke Candy)	2012	—	—	—	—	—	—	—	—		Super Ultra and True Romance
"London Queen"	2014	—	—	—	—	—	—	—	—		Sucker
"Gold Coins"	2014	—	—	—	—	—	—	—	—		Sucker
"Breaking Up"	2014	—	—	—	—	—	—	—	—		Sucker
"Vroom Vroom"	2015	—	—	—	—	—	—	—	—	BPI: Silver	Vroom Vroom
"Trophy"	2016	—	—	—	—	—	—	—	—		Vroom Vroom
"After the Afterparty" (VIP Mix) (featuring Raye, Stefflon Don and Rita Ora)	2017	—	—	—	—	—	—	—	—		Non-album single
"Unlock It" (featuring Kim Petras and Jay Park)	2017	—	—	—	—	—	—	—	—		Pop 2
"I Got It" (featuring Brooke Candy, Cupcakke, and Pabllo Vittar)	2017	—	—	—	—	—	—	—	—		Pop 2
"Cross You Out" (featuring Sky Ferreira)	2019	—	—	—	— (Note: "Cross You Out" did not enter the NZ Top 40 Singles Chart, but peaked at number 36 on the NZ Hot Singles Chart.)	—	—	—	—		Charli
"Warm" (featuring Haim)	2019	—	—	—	—	—	—	—	—		Charli
"February 2017" (featuring Clairo and Yaeji)	2019	—	—	—	— (Note: "February 2017" did not enter the NZ Top 40 Singles Chart, but peaked at number 40 on the NZ Hot Singles Chart.)	—	—	—	—		Charli
"2099" (featuring Troye Sivan)	2019	—	—	—	—	—	—	—			Charli
"Click" (No Boys Remix) (featuring Kim Petras and Slayyyter)	2019	—	—	—	—	—	—	—	—		Charli
"We Are Born to Play" (Galantis featuring Charli XCX)	2020	—	—	—	—	—	—	—	—		Super Nintendo World
"Enemy"	2020	—	—	—	— (Note: "Enemy" did not enter the NZ Top 40 Singles Chart, but peaked at number 31 on the NZ Hot Singles Chart.)	—	—	—	—		How I'm Feeling Now
"Von Dutch" (Remix) (with A. G. Cook featuring Addison Rae)	2024	—	—	—	— (Note: "Von Dutch A.G. Cook Remix featuring Addison Rae" did not enter the NZ Top 40 Singles Chart, but peaked at number 25 on the NZ Hot Singles Chart.)	—	—	—	—		Brat and It's Completely Different but Also Still Brat
"Club Classics"	2024	—	—	—	— (Note: "Club Classics" did not enter the NZ Top 40 Singles Chart, but peaked at number 12 on the NZ Hot Singles Chart.)	97	—	11	199	BPI: Silver; MC: Gold; RMNZ: Gold	Brat
"B2B"	2024	—	—	96	—	—	—	19	—	BPI: Silver; MC: Gold; RMNZ: Gold	Brat
"360" (Remix) (featuring Robyn and Young Lean)	2024	—	—	—	— (Note: "360 Remix featuring Robyn and Yung Lean" did not enter the NZ Top 40 Singles Chart, but peaked at number 22 on the NZ Hot Singles Chart.)	—	—	—	—		Brat and It's Completely Different but Also Still Brat
"Girl, So Confusing" (Remix) (featuring Lorde)	2024	50	57	—	24	—	63	3	59		Brat and It's Completely Different but Also Still Brat
"House" (featuring John Cale)	2025	—	—	—	— (Note: "House" did not enter the NZ Top 40 Singles Chart, but peaked at number 21 on the NZ Hot Singles Chart.)	—	—	—	—		Wuthering Heights
"Wall of Sound"	2026	—	—	—	— (Note: "Wall of Sound" did not enter the NZ Top 40 Singles Chart, but peaked at number 19 on the NZ Hot Singles Chart.)	—	—	—	—		Wuthering Heights
"—" denotes a recording that did not chart or was not released in that territory.

== Other charted and certified songs ==
List of other charted songs and certified, showing year released, selected chart positions, certifications, and originating album
Title	Year	Peak chart positions										Certifications	Album
Title	Year	UK	AUS	CAN	IRE	NLD	NZ	SWE	US	US Dance	WW	Certifications	Album
"3AM (Pull Up)" (featuring MØ)	2017	—	—	—	—	—	— (Note: "3AM (Pull Up)" did not enter the NZ Top 40 Singles Chart, but peaked at number nine on the NZ Heatseekers Chart.)	—	—	—	—		Number 1 Angel
"911" (A. G. Cook Remix) (Lady Gaga featuring A. G. Cook and Charli XCX)	2021	—	—	—	—	—	— (Note: "911 (A. G. Cook Remix)" did not enter the NZ Top 40 Singles Chart, but peaked at number 34 on the NZ Hot Singles Chart.)	—	—	14	—		Dawn of Chromatica
"Crash"	2022	—	—	—	—	—	— (Note: "Crash" did not enter the NZ Top 40 Singles Chart, but peaked at number 27 on the NZ Hot Singles Chart.)	—	—	—	—		Crash
"Constant Repeat"	2022	—	—	—	—	—	— (Note: "Constan Repeat" did not enter the NZ Top 40 Singles Chart, but peaked at number 28 on the NZ Hot Singles Chart.)	—	—	—	—		Crash
"Yuck"	2022	—	—	—	—	—	— (Note: "Yuck" did not enter the NZ Top 40 Singles Chart, but peaked at number 29 on the NZ Hot Singles Chart.)	—	—	—	—		Crash
"2 Die 4" (Addison Rae featuring Charli XCX)	2023	—	—	—	67	—	— (Note: "2 Die 4" did not enter the NZ Top 40 Singles Chart, but peaked at number 13 on the NZ Hot Singles Chart.)	—	—	—	—		AR
"Sympathy Is a Knife"	2024	56	21	—	—	—	18	—	—	10	—	MC: Platinum; RMNZ: Gold	Brat
"I Might Say Something Stupid"	2024	—	—	—	—	—	—	—	—	18	—		Brat
"Talk Talk"	2024	47	42	—	62	—	— (Note: "Talk Talk" did not enter the NZ Top 40 Singles Chart, but peaked at number 6 on the NZ Hot Singles Chart.)	—	— (Note: "Talk Talk" did not enter the Billboard Hot 100, but peaked at number 3 on the Bubbling Under Hot 100 chart.)	5	—	MC: Platinum; RMNZ: Gold	Brat
"Everything Is Romantic"	2024	54	—	—	42	—	— (Note: "Everything Is Romantic" did not enter the NZ Top 40 Singles Chart, but peaked at number 13 on the NZ Hot Singles Chart.)	—	—	14	—	BPI: Silver; MC: Gold	Brat
"Rewind"	2024	—	—	—	—	—	—	—	—	20	—		Brat
"So I"	2024	—	—	—	—	—	—	—	—	26	—		Brat
"Girl, So Confusing"	2024	28	—	—	25	—	—	—	—	24	—	BPI: Gold; MC: Platinum; RMNZ: Platinum	Brat
"Mean Girls"	2024	—	—	—	—	—	—	—	—	21	—		Brat
"I Think About It All the Time"	2024	—	—	—	—	—	—	—	—	30	—		Brat
"365"	2024	63	91	—	28	—	— (Note: "365" did not enter the NZ Top 40 Singles Chart, but peaked at number 38 on the NZ Hot Singles Chart.)	—	— (Note: "365" did not enter the Billboard Hot 100, but peaked at number nine on the Bubbling Under Hot 100 chart.)	8	131	BPI: Gold; MC: Platinum; RMNZ: Gold	Brat
"Guess"	2024	—	—	—	—	—	— (Note: "Guess" did not enter the NZ Top 40 Singles Chart, but peaked at number 28 on the NZ Hot Singles Chart.)	—	—	16	—	MC: 3× Platinum; RMNZ: 2× Platinum	Brat and It's the Same but There's Three More Songs So It's Not
"Spring Breakers"	2024	—	—	—	—	—	—	—	—	30	—		Brat and It's the Same but There's Three More Songs So It's Not
"Club Classics" (featuring BB Trickz)	2024	—	—	—	—	—	— (Note: "Club Classics" did not enter the NZ Top 40 Singles Chart, but peaked at number seven on the NZ Hot Singles Chart.)	—	— (Note: "Club Classics" did not enter the Billboard Hot 100, but peaked at number 13 on the Bubbling Under Hot 100 chart.)	8	—		Brat and It's Completely Different but Also Still Brat
"Sympathy Is a Knife" (Remix) (featuring Ariana Grande)	2024	7	—	37	7	95	— (Note: "Sympathy Is a Knife" did not enter the NZ Top 40 Singles Chart, but peaked at number one on the NZ Hot Singles Chart.)	61	36	2	20	BPI: Gold	Brat and It's Completely Different but Also Still Brat
"I Might Say Something Stupid" (featuring the 1975 and Jon Hopkins)	2024	—	—	—	—	—	—	—	—	13	—		Brat and It's Completely Different but Also Still Brat
"Rewind" (featuring Bladee)	2024	—	—	—	—	—	—	—	—	16	—		Brat and It's Completely Different but Also Still Brat
"So I" (featuring A. G. Cook)	2024	—	—	—	—	—	—	—	—	19	—		Brat and It's Completely Different but Also Still Brat
"B2B" (featuring Tinashe)	2024	—	—	—	—	—	—	—	—	14	—		Brat and It's Completely Different but Also Still Brat
"Mean Girls" (featuring Julian Casablancas)	2024	—	—	—	—	—	—	—	—	17	—		Brat and It's Completely Different but Also Still Brat
"I Think About It All the Time" (featuring Bon Iver)	2024	—	—	—	—	—	—	—	—	18	—		Brat and It's Completely Different but Also Still Brat
"365" (featuring Shygirl)	2024	—	—	83	—	—	— (Note: "365" did not enter the NZ Top 40 Singles Chart, but peaked at number eight on the NZ Hot Singles Chart.)	—	— (Note: "365" did not enter the Billboard Hot 100, but peaked at number 3 on the Bubbling Under Hot 100 chart.)	6	—		Brat and It's Completely Different but Also Still Brat
"Spring Breakers" (featuring Kesha)	2024	—	—	—	—	—	—	—	—	20	—		Brat and It's Completely Different but Also Still Brat
"Dying for You"	2026	24	—	—	18	—	— (Note: "Dying for You" did not enter the NZ Top 40 Singles Chart, but peaked at number 7 on the NZ Hot Singles Chart.)	—	— (Note: "Dying for You" did not enter the Billboard Hot 100, but peaked at number 12 on the Bubbling Under Hot 100 chart.)	—	—		Wuthering Heights
"Always Everywhere"	2026	33	—	91	48	—	— (Note: "Always Everywhere" did not enter the NZ Top 40 Singles Chart, but peaked at number 9 on the NZ Hot Singles Chart.)	—	— (Note: "Always Everywhere" did not enter the Billboard Hot 100, but peaked at number 1 on the Bubbling Under Hot 100 chart.)	—	191		Wuthering Heights
"Out of Myself"	2026	—	—	—	—	—	— (Note: "Out of Myself" did not enter the NZ Top 40 Singles Chart, but peaked at number 17 on the NZ Hot Singles Chart.)	—	—	—	—		Wuthering Heights
"Card Declined"	2026	—	—	—	—	—	— (Note: "Card Declined" did not enter the NZ Top 40 Singles Chart, but peaked at number 10 on the NZ Hot 40 Singles Chart.)	—	—	—	—		Music, Fashion, Film
"2007"	2026	100	—	—	—	—	— (Note: "2007" did not enter the NZ Top 40 Singles Chart, but peaked at number 8 on the NZ Hot 40 Singles Chart.)	—	—	—	—		Music, Fashion, Film
"Yeah"	2026	—	—	—	—	—	— (Note: "Yeah" did not enter the NZ Top 40 Singles Chart, but peaked at number 11 on the NZ Hot 40 Singles Chart.)	—	—	—	—		Music, Fashion, Film
"—" denotes a recording that did not chart or was not released in that territory.

== Guest appearances ==
List of non-single guest appearances, with other performing artists, showing year released and album name
Title	Year	Other artist(s)	Album
"Your Eyes"	2010	Ocelot	No Requests
"Smile"	2013	Benga	Chapter II
"Float On"	2013	Danny Brown	Old
"Just Desserts"	2013	Marina and the Diamonds	none
"Kingdom"	2014	Simon Le Bon	The Hunger Games: Mockingjay – Part 1
"Diamonds"	2015	Giorgio Moroder	Déjà Vu
"Rollercoaster"	2015	Bleachers	Terrible Thrills Vol. 2
"Oz vs. Eden"	2015	Lawrence Rothman	none
"Banshee"	2016	Santigold	99¢
"For U"	2016	Miike Snow	iii
"No Fun"	2016	none	Vinyl: The Essentials: Best of Season 1
"Explode"	2016	none	The Angry Birds Movie: Original Motion Picture Soundtrack
"Deadstream" (Rostam Version)	2017	Jim-E Stack, Rostam	It's Jim-ee
"I'm a Dream"	2017	BC Unidos	Bicycle
"Don't Delete the Kisses" (Charli XCX x Post Precious remix)	2018	Wolf Alice, Post Precious	Don't Delete the Kisses (Remixes)
"Moonlight"	2018	Lil Xan	Total Xanarchy
"100 Bad" (Charli XCX remix)	2018	Tommy Genesis	Tommy Genesis
"If It's Over"	2018	MØ	Forever Neverland
"Playboy Style"	2018	Clean Bandit, Bhad Bhabie	What Is Love?
"Miss U"	2019	none	13 Reasons Why: Season 3
"Charger" (Charli XCX rework)	2021	Elio	Elio and Friends: The Remixes
"911" (Charli XCX and A. G. Cook remix)	2021	Lady Gaga	Dawn of Chromatica
"Welcome to My Island" (George Daniel and Charli XCX remix)	2023	Caroline Polachek	none
"2 Die 4"	2023	Addison Rae	AR

== Songwriting credits ==
List of songs written or co-written for other artists, showing year released and album name
Title	Year	Artist(s)	Album
"So Alive"	2014	Neon Jungle	Welcome to the Jungle
"OctaHate"	2014	Ryn Weaver	The Fool
"Say Fuck It"	2014	Buckcherry	Fuck
"When I Find Love Again"	2014	James Blunt	Moon Landing (Apollo Edition)
"Boyfriend Material"	2014	Bella Thorne	Jersey
"Beg for It" (featuring MØ)	2014	Iggy Azalea	Reclassified
"OK"	2015	Madeon	Adventure
"Classic Man" (featuring Roman GianArthur)	2015	Jidenna	Wondaland Presents: The Eephus
"Same Old Love"	2015	Selena Gomez	Revival
"Boys & Girls" (featuring Pia Mia)	2016	will.i.am	Non-album single
"I, U, Us"	2016	Raye	Second
"Jealous"	2016	AlunaGeorge	I Remember
"Drum"	2016	MØ	Non-album singles
"Blow You Up" (featuring AlunaGeorge and Less Is Moore)	2016	Yogi	Non-album singles
"Bang Bang" (featuring R. City, Selah Sue and Craig David)	2016	DJ Fresh and Diplo	Non-album singles
"Gravity"	2017	Blondie	Pollinator
"Tonight" (featuring Laurie Anderson)	2017	Blondie	Pollinator
"Phases"	2017	Alma and French Montana	Non-album singles
"OMG" (featuring Quavo)	2017	Camila Cabello	Non-album singles
"Dance for Me" (featuring MØ)	2018	Alma	Heavy Rules Mixtape
"Moments Noticed"	2018	Jim-E Stack	It's Jim-ee - EP
"Be Right Here" (featuring Goldn)	2018	Kungs and Stargate	Non-album singles
"My Sex" (featuring Mykki Blanco, Pussy Riot and MNDR)	2018	Brooke Candy	Non-album singles
"Tears & Tantrums"	2018	XYLØ	Non-album singles
"Hurts Like Hell" (featuring Offset)	2018	Madison Beer	Non-album singles
"Cool 3D World"	2018	Tommy Cash	¥€$
"Someone New"	2019	Astrid S	Trust Issues
"Girls Like Us"	2019	Twice	Fancy You
"Señorita"	2019	Shawn Mendes and Camila Cabello	Shawn Mendes (Deluxe) and Romance
"Win"	2019	Nasty Cherry	Season 1
"Live Forever"	2019	Nasty Cherry	Season 1
"Repeat"	2020	Karen	Repeat EP
"We Lost the Summer"	2020	TXT	Minisode1: Blue Hour
"Six Six Six"	2021	Nasty Cherry	The Movie
"Her Body"	2021	Nasty Cherry	The Movie
"You For Me"	2021	Sigala and Rita Ora	Every Cloud
"Genjitsu Camera"	2021	Kalen Anzai	Anti Heroine
"Friends"	2023	The Japanese House	In the End It Always Does
"No Body"	2023	Easyfun	Electric
"Heavy"	2023	Thy Slaughter	Soft Rock
"Bullets"	2023	Thy Slaughter	Soft Rock
"Britpop"	2024	A. G. Cook	Britpop
"Lucifer"	2024	A. G. Cook	Britpop
"Block"	2024	Brooke Candy	Candyland
"Bluest Flame"	2025	Selena Gomez and Benny Blanco	I Said I Love You First
"Gabriela"	2025	Katseye	Beautiful Chaos
"Real Friends"	2025	XO	Fashionably Late
"Dread"	2025	A. G. Cook	The Moment (The Score)
"Don't Want Your Love"	2026	Illenium and Ellie Goulding	Odyssey
"Burial"	2026	Anne Hathaway	Mother Mary: Greatest Hits
"Holy Spirit"	2026	Anne Hathaway	Mother Mary: Greatest Hits
"Dark Cradle"	2026	Anne Hathaway	Mother Mary: Greatest Hits
"Blue Flame"	2026	Anne Hathaway	Mother Mary: Greatest Hits
"Cut Ties"	2026	Anne Hathaway	Mother Mary: Greatest Hits
"Anybody"	2026	Skrillex and ISOxo	Soma
"Bel Air"	2026	Katseye	Wild

== Music videos ==
=== As lead artist ===
List of music videos as lead artist, showing year released and director(s)
Title	Year	Director
"Nuclear Seasons"	2011	Ryan Andrews
"You're the One"	2012	Dawn Shadforth
"You're the One" (remix) (featuring The Internet, Mike G)	2012	Ryan Andrews, Claire Boyd
"So Far Away"	2012	Ryan Andrews
"Cloud Aura" (featuring Brooke Candy)	2012	Ryan Andrews
"You (Ha Ha Ha)"	2013	Ryan Andrews
"What I Like"	2013	Ryan Andrews
"Take My Hand"	2013	Ryan Andrews
"SuperLove"	2013	Ryan Andrews
"Boom Clap"	2014	Sing J. Lee
"Break the Rules"	2014	Marc Klasfeld
"Breaking Up"	2014	BRTHR
"Doing It" (featuring Rita Ora)	2015	Adam Powell
"Famous"	2015	Eric Wareheim
"Vroom Vroom"	2016	Bradley & Pablo
"After the Afterparty" (featuring Lil Yatchy)	2016	Diane Martel
"Boys"	2017	Charli XCX, Sarah McColgan
"5 in the Morning"	2018	Bradley & Pablo
"1999" (featuring Troye Sivan)	2018	Charli XCX, Ryan Staake
"Blame It On Your Love" (featuring Lizzo)	2019	Bradley & Pablo
"Gone" (featuring Christine and the Queens)	2019	Colin Solal Cardo
"2099" (featuring Troye Sivan)	2019	Bradley & Pablo
"White Mercedes"	2019	Colin Solal Cardo
"Forever"	2020	Dan Streit
"Claws"	2020	Charlotte Rutherford
"Spinning"	2021	Karlos Velásquez
"Good Ones"	2021	Hannah Lux Davis
"New Shapes" (featuring Christine and the Queens, Caroline Polachek)	2021	Imogene Strauss, Luke Orlando, Terrence O'Connor
"Beg for You" (featuring Rina Sawayama)	2022	Nick Harwood
"Baby"	2022	Imogene Strauss, Luke Orlando
"Every Rule"	2022	Imogene Strauss, Luke Orlando
"Used to Know Me"	2022	Alex Lill
"Hot In It" (with Tiësto)	2022	Hannah Lux Davis
"Speed Drive"	2023	Ramez Silyan
"Von Dutch"	2024	Torso
"360"	2024	Aidan Zamiri
"Guess" (featuring Billie Eilish)	2024	Aidan Zamiri
"Party 4 U"	2025	Mitch Ryan
"House"	2025	Mitch Ryan
"Chains of Love"	2025	C Prinz
"Always Everywhere"	2026	Mitch Ryan
"Rock Music"	2026	Aidan Zamiri
"I Keep On Thinking Bout You Every Single Day and Night"	2026	Aidan Zamiri
"SS26"	2026	Torso
"Playboy Bunny"	2026	Henry Redcliffe
"Wink Wink"	2026	Aidan Zamiri
"Camera"	2026	Aidan Zamiri
"If You Take Away The Music Then What Has She Got?"	2026	Aidan Zamiri

=== Guest appearances ===
List of other artists' music videos starring Charli XCX, showing year released and director(s)
Year	Title	Role	Artist	Director
2026	"Residue"	Herself	A. G. Cook	Aidan Zamiri

== Footnotes ==
Notes for albums and songs

Notes for peak chart positions
