= You (Ha Ha Ha) =

Single by Charli XCX

from the album True Romance
- Released: 8 February 2013
- Genre: Electropop; dance-pop; futurepop
- Length: 3:06
- Label: Warner Music UK
- Songwriters: Charlotte Aitchison; Derwin Dicker; Jocke Åhlund
- Producer: Ahlund

Charli XCX singles chronology
"Cloud Aura" (2012)	"You (Ha Ha Ha)" (2013)	"What I Like" (2013)

Music video
- "You (Ha Ha Ha)" on YouTube

"You (Ha Ha Ha)" is a song by British singer Charli XCX from her debut studio album, True Romance (2013). It was released as the album's fourth single in February 2013, along with several remixes. A music video for the song was released on YouTube on 10 January 2013.

== Composition ==
You (Ha Ha Ha) relies heavily on a sample of Gold Panda's single "You". The sample provides "psychedelic loops" to the track, that contains "maddening trance and haunted-house echoes" and "aural flourishes". The sound of the single has been described as a "combination of UK electro and saccharine vocals". It is set in the key of C Minor.

== Critical reception ==
In its list of the best songs of 2013, Pitchfork ranked "You (Ha Ha Ha)" at number 61. It praised the Gold Panda sample, saying that it "could even make Tumblr’s weird pop elite attempt a shimmy." In its review of the album for the same magazine, Marc Hogan called the track "gorgeously bitter". The song was also said to be "vindictive and catchy" by AllMusic, who named it as a highlight of the album. Meanwhile, when reviewing True Romance, Art Ivan of Tiny Mix Tapes found the song to be "a relatively unremarkable, straight pop song that still pushes things along, especially after the self-sustaining 'Nuclear Seasons'.” When presenting the music video, Marc Hogan of Spin said that the new single "wonderfully emphasizes the pure-pop joy and street-cool swagger that lurks behind the hypnotic shadows on tracks by the likes of not only Panda, but also current Charli collaborator Clams Casino[...]"

The track appeared in many year-end lists of the best songs of 2013. Spin included the single at number 31, comparing it to Charli XCX's previous single "I Love It" as "subtler, sharper, sleeker [and] more vicious." It was also ranked 33rd in similar lists by Consequence of Sound and 40th in the annual Village Voice's Pazz and Jop poll.

== Music video ==
The video for "You (Ha Ha Ha)" was uploaded to Charli XCX's official YouTube channel on 10 January 2013. Pitchfork writer Carrie Battan said of the video that it "centers around a now very fashionable early-90s rave aesthetic and features lots of girls with platform shoes and candy-colored hair partying in a gun factory." As of July 2021, the video has over 10 million views.

After the release of the video, Charli shared a hand-written statement on her Twitter account defending the video and its firearm imagery, as it was released in the weeks after the Sandy Hook Elementary School shooting:

"Myself, my friends + the director, Ryan Andrews shot the video in October, so I’ve been waiting for a while to put it out, + now it’s out there. [...] The idea is to make lipstick, not war, but I’d like to say sorry if anyone has mistaken this video for advocating violence. I’m swapping bullets for lipstick + firing out shots of love with my kick ass girl gang from outerspace!"

== In popular culture ==
The song was featured in the 2014 movie Vampire Academy, and was present in one of its trailers. The song was also used in a commercial for JBL Pulse Wireless Bluetooth Speaker. Finally, in Spring 2013, the track was included in Perez Hilton's compilation Pop-up #2 alongside other artists like Sky Ferreira, Bastille and Tegan and Sara.

== Track listing ==
- Digital EP
1. "You (Ha Ha Ha)" — 3:06
2. "You (Ha Ha Ha) [Instrumental]" — 3:06
3. "You (Ha Ha Ha) [BURNS' Violet Cloud Version]" — 5:04
4. "You (Ha Ha Ha) [Goldroom Remix]" — 6:45
5. "You (Ha Ha Ha) [Melé Remix]" — 3:59
6. "You (Ha Ha Ha) [MS MR Remix]" — 3:46
