= Wuthering Heights (soundtrack) =

2026 Soundtrack album by Charli XCX

Soundtrack album / studio album by Charli XCX
- Released: 13 February 2026
- Recorded: 2025
- Studios: Laurelvale (Los Angeles); ARM (Los Angeles); Ahata Sound (Los Angeles); Rue Boyer (Paris); Abbey Road (London); Air-Edel (London)
- Length: 34:34
- Label: Atlantic
- Producers: Finn Keane; Nathan Klein; Justin Raisen; Lewis Pesacov

Charli XCX chronology
Brat and It's Completely Different but Also Still Brat (2024)	Wuthering Heights (2026)	Music, Fashion, Film (2026)

Singles from Wuthering Heights
- 1. "House" Released: 10 November 2025; 2. "Chains of Love" Released: 13 November 2025; 3. "Wall of Sound" Released: 16 January 2026; 4. "Always Everywhere" Released: 13 February 2026

Wuthering Heights is the soundtrack to the 2026 film of the same name and the seventh studio album by the British singer and songwriter Charli XCX, released on 13 February 2026 by Atlantic Records, the same day as the film's theatrical release. The album's lead single, "House" featuring the Welsh musician John Cale, was released on 10 November 2025 and served as a significant departure from the sound of Charli XCX's previous album, Brat (2024). Wuthering Heights spawned three further singles: "Chains of Love" on 13 November 2025, "Wall of Sound" on 16 January 2026 and "Always Everywhere" on the same day as the album.

Work on the album began in December 2024, when the film's writer and director Emerald Fennell approached Charli XCX to compose a song for its soundtrack. Inspired by the screenplay, Charli XCX wrote several songs with frequent collaborator Finn Keane and decided to make a full companion album for the film, which she and Keane recorded during the Brat Tour throughout 2025.

== Background ==
Throughout the release and touring for her 2024 album Brat, Charli XCX struggled with exhaustion and a lack of creative inspiration that made her feel like she "wouldn't be able to make music anymore". In December 2024, Emerald Fennell messaged Charli XCX to record a song for her film adaptation of Wuthering Heights (1847). Charli XCX "immediately felt inspired" after reading Fennell's screenplay and worked on several tracks with frequent collaborator Finn Keane, later suggesting to Fennell that she create a full concept album for the film with songs that were "connected to the world [Fennell] was creating". Describing the musical style of the album as an "elegant and brutal sound palette" that "couldn't be more different from Brat", Charli XCX wanted the album to reflect "a world that felt undeniably raw, wild, sexual, gothic, [and] British". She created most of the album with Keane, with the pair writing and recording songs in rented studio spaces throughout 2025 while she was on the Brat Tour.

While writing "House", Charli was inspired by Todd Haynes's 2021 documentary film The Velvet Underground, in which the Velvet Underground band member John Cale said that the group's songs needed to be "elegant and brutal". In mid-2024, she asked Cale for feedback on the music she had been working on for the album, and after taking an interest in "House", he recorded the spoken word poem featured in the song. In April 2026, following the release of Wuthering Heights, American singer-songwriter Sky Ferreira, who is featured on the track "Eyes of the World", accused Charli XCX of using her old demos for the soundtrack without credit. Charli XCX's management has denied the claims.

== Composition ==
After multiple reviews found similarities between the second Wuthering Heights single "Chains of Love" and her debut album True Romance (2013), (Note: As discussed by Eddie Fu of Consequence, Tom Breihan of Stereogum, Konstantinos Pappis of Our Culture Mag and Sal Cinquemani of Slant Magazine) Charli XCX tweeted that "the Wuthering Heights album is 100% a sister of True Romance". The lyrics were noted for focusing more on the novel's "vibe" than on its plot, using motifs such as attraction, devotion and absence. Helen Brown of The Independent summarised that the soundtrack "leans hard, at times, into the script's BDSM vibe", while Alexis Petridis of The Guardian stated that no knowledge of the novel is required to understand the songs.

The opening track "House" featuring John Cale, noted for its noisy and distorted instrumentation, was described as a gothic rock, (Note: As discussed by Adam England of NME, Paolo Ragusa of Consequence, Jillian Giandurco of Nylon and Natoli Ibrahim of Exclaim!) industrial rock, and neoclassical dark wave song. In his review of the song, Petridis called it "powerful, striking and rewarding", comparing it to the industrial music of Nine Inch Nails and saying that it "[bore] almost no relation in sound or mood to the contents of Brat". Music critics considered the other tracks on Wuthering Heights to more closely resemble Charli XCX's past music due to their electronic sound and heavily autotuned vocals, while noting the prominence of strings. (Note: As discussed by Petridis, Harry Tafoya of Pitchfork, John Murphy of MusicOMH, Michael Savio of Slant Magazine and Josh Korngut of Exclaim!) "Wall of Sound" lacks any percussion and is built around increasingly intense string arrangements. "Dying for You", according to Petridis, "marries the dynamics of a rave breakdown to occasionally atonal strings". Multiple reviewers considered it the most straightforward pop song on the soundtrack. "Always Everywhere" and "Chains of Love" are synth-pop ballads, with the latter receiving comparisons to 1980s music.

"Out of Myself" draws on "walls of violins and doomy synths". Robin Murray of Clash considered its lyrics to go beyond the Wuthering Heights universe and form a metaphor for Charli's relationship with songwriting. "Open Up" is the shortest song and also lacks percussion. Its sparse, echoey vocals were described as "ghostly". "Seeing Things", built around staccato strings, is "almost baroque pop". Its lyrics discuss "madness and visions". Josh Korngut of Exclaim! compared "Altars" to Gwen Stefani's "Cool". It lyrically references Harry Nilsson's "One". "Eyes of the World" featuring Sky Ferreira is a power ballad noted for its "dramatic" quality. (Note: As discussed by Murphy, Korngut, Tanatat Khuttapan of The Line of Best Fit and Jon Dolan of Rolling Stone) "My Reminder" features Europop influences. The closing track "Funny Mouth" was variously described as trip hop, alt-pop and electronica, with Murphy noting "atonal strings". Petridis considered its production a callback to "House". Harry Tafoya of Pitchfork opined that it "sounds far more like a lost Vulnicura cut than anything on Brat", while Murray saw similarities between the opening synths and Angelo Badalamenti's Twin Peaks theme.

== Release ==
On 6 November 2025, Charli XCX posted a short clip of a new song titled "House" featuring a spoken word poem by Welsh musician John Cale of the Velvet Underground. The song was released as the album's lead single on 10 November, alongside a music video directed by Mitch Ryan. The second single, "Chains of Love", was released on 13 November, with a music video later released on 17 November. "Wall of Sound" was released without prior announcement as the album's third single on 16 January 2026. Charli XCX announced the album's track list on 28 January 2026. "Always Everywhere" and its music video were released on 13 February 2026, the same day as the album.

== Critical reception ==
Professional ratings
Aggregate scores
Source	Rating
AnyDecentMusic?	7.8/10
Metacritic	82/100
Review scores
Source	Rating
Clash	8/10
Exclaim!	8/10
The Guardian	4/5 stars
The Independent	5/5 stars
The Line of Best Fit	7/10
MusicOMH	4/5 stars
Pitchfork	7.4/10
Rolling Stone	4/5 stars
Slant Magazine	3.5/5 stars

On Metacritic, which uses a weighted average out of 100 to reviews from mainstream publications, Wuthering Heights received a score of 82, indicating "universal acclaim". Lillian Hingley, a Postdoctoral Researcher in English Literature at the University of Oxford, noted the soundtrack's unique experimentation and adaptation of elements from Emily Brontë's novel and highlighted the album's interrogation of the concept of self. Hingley concluded by describing the album as "a productive, imaginative, beautiful haunting".

=== Individual songs ===
The soundtrack's lead single "House" was highlighted as one of the best songs released that week by staff members at The Fader and Stereogum, while the second single "Chains of Love" was featured in Rolling Stone's "Songs You Need to Know". In June 2026, the track "Dying for You" was named by Billboard staff as one of 50 Best Songs of 2026 So Far, ranking at number 19.

== Commercial performance ==
Wuthering Heights debuted at number one on the UK Albums Chart dated 20 February 2026, selling 21,071 units in its first week and earning Charli XCX her third number-one album in the United Kingdom.

In the United States, the album debuted at number eight on the Billboard 200, selling 51,000 album-equivalent units in its first week, including 26,000 in pure sales and 24.85 million streams. The album also debuted at number one on the US Soundtrack Albums chart, marking Charli XCX's first number one album in the United States.

== Track listing ==
Wuthering Heights track listing
No.	Title	Writer(s)	Producer(s)	Length
1.	"House" (featuring John Cale)	Charlotte Aitchison; John Cale; Finn Keane; Nathan Klein	Keane; Klein	3:18
2.	"Wall of Sound"	Aitchison; Keane	Keane	2:24
3.	"Dying for You"	Aitchison; Keane; Justin Raisen	Keane	3:02
4.	"Always Everywhere"	Aitchison; Keane; Raisen; Lewis Pesacov	Keane; Raisen; Pesacov	3:03
5.	"Chains of Love"	Aitchison; Keane; Raisen	Keane; Raisen	2:50
6.	"Out of Myself"	Aitchison; Keane	Keane	2:19
7.	"Open Up"	Aitchison; Keane	Keane	1:26
8.	"Seeing Things"	Aitchison; Keane; Raisen	Keane	2:30
9.	"Altars"	Aitchison; Raisen	Keane	2:56
10.	"Eyes of the World" (featuring Sky Ferreira)	Aitchison; Keane; Raisen; Ferreira	Keane; Raisen^{[a]}	3:43
11.	"My Reminder"	Aitchison; Raisen	Keane; Raisen^{[a]}	3:33
12.	"Funny Mouth"	Aitchison; Keane; Joe Keery	Keane	3:33
Total length:				34:34

Note

- ^{^[a]} signifies an additional producer.

== Personnel ==
Credits were adapted from Tidal.

=== Musicians ===
- Charli XCX – vocals
- John Cale – featured vocals (track 1)
- Sky Ferreira — featured vocals (track 10)
- Phoebe Little – additional vocals (1)
- Becky Knight – cello (1)
- Gareth Murphy – string orchestration (2–10, 12)
- Amy Tress – violin (2–10, 12)
- Eloisa-Fleur Thom – violin (2–10, 12)
- Jenny Sacha – violin (2–10, 12)
- Max Baillie – violin (2–10, 12)
- Raja Halder – violin (2–10, 12)
- Sara Trickey – violin (2–10, 12)
- Warren Zielinski – violin (2–10, 12)
- Clifton Harrison – viola (2–10, 12)
- Laurie Anderson – viola (2–10, 12)
- Meghan Cassidy – viola (2–10, 12)
- Ashok Klouda – cello (2–10, 12)
- Jonathan Byers – cello (2–10, 12)
- Stephanie Tress – cello (2–10, 12)
- Dominic Worsley – double bass (2–10, 12)
- Lucy Shaw – double bass (2–10, 12)

=== Technical ===
- Dustin Boyer – engineering (1)
- Nick Taylor – engineering (2–12)
- Luke Buneo – engineering assistance (2–4, 6, 8, 9, 11, 12)
- Zach Anderson – engineering assistance (2–4, 6, 8, 9, 11, 12)
- Tom Ashpitel – engineering assistance (2, 6, 7, 12)
- Tom Norris – mixing
- Idania Valencia – mastering

== Charts ==
Chart performance for Wuthering Heights
Chart (2026)	Peak position
Australian Albums (ARIA)	4
Austrian Albums (Ö3 Austria)	2
Belgian Albums (Ultratop Flanders)	5
Belgian Albums (Ultratop Wallonia)	4
Canadian Albums (Billboard)	14
Croatian International Albums (HDU)	1
Danish Albums (Hitlisten)	16
Dutch Albums (Album Top 100)	6
Finnish Albums (Suomen virallinen lista)	19
French Albums (SNEP)	19
German Albums (Offizielle Top 100)	5
German Pop Albums (Offizielle Top 100)	1
Greek Albums (IFPI)	3
Hungarian Albums (MAHASZ)	8
Irish Albums (Official Charts)	4
Italian Albums (FIMI)	25
Lithuanian Albums (AGATA)	10
New Zealand Albums (RMNZ)	4
Norwegian Albums (IFPI Norge)	14
Polish Albums (ZPAV)	8
Portuguese Albums (AFP)	8
Scottish Albums (Official Charts)	1
Spanish Albums (Promusicae)	5
Swedish Albums (Sverigetopplistan)	13
Swiss Albums (Schweizer Hitparade)	2
UK Albums (Official Charts)	1
US Billboard 200	8
US Soundtrack Albums (Billboard)	1

== Release history ==
Release history
Region	Date	Format(s)	Label	Ref.
Various	13 February 2026	Cassette tape; CD; digital download; streaming; vinyl	Atlantic	
