= Pierre (song) =

2015 song by Ryn Weaver

Song by Ryn Weaver

from the album The Fool
- Released: June 16, 2015
- Genre: Indie pop
- Length: 3:23
- Label: Mad Love; Interscope
- Songwriters: Aryn Wüthrich; Michael Angelakos; Benjamin Levin; Ryan Tedder
- Producers: Blanco; Angelakos

"Pierre" is a song recorded by American singer-songwriter Ryn Weaver. It is the third track on her debut studio album, The Fool, which was released on June 16, 2015, through Interscope Records.

== Commercial performance ==
"Pierre" saw little commercial success after its initial release in 2015. In 2021, interest was revitalized in the song after it went viral on the social media platform TikTok, leading to its debut on the global Spotify Viral 50 chart at number eight. "Pierre" has been used to soundtrack multiple trends on the platform, such as the #PerfectDrink challenge in which users attempt creating a drink by the end of a 45-second clip of the song.

"Pierre" found notable success in the British Isles. It first charted in Ireland, reaching number 30 in its seventh week on the IRMA singles chart. In the United Kingdom, the song debuted at number 50 in the first week of March 2021, spending four weeks on the UK Singles Chart.

== Critical reception ==
"Pierre" received generally favorable reviews from critics. Time complimented the track's "vibrant" songwriting, describing it as a "[yarn] about flings with tantalizing details that never give the full story". The Guardian described it as "EDM fueled stomp-pop", and Brooke Pawling Stennett of The Young Folks wrote that it was "as addicting as the smell of the ocean".

== Live performances ==
Weaver previewed the track in early 2015 at live events like Coachella before its June release date. A live, stripped rendition of the song with orchestral accompaniment was released through YouTube on May 28, 2015. This performance would later appear on the Target version and international releases of The Fool as the 'Siren Sessions' version.

== Charts ==
Chart (2021)	Peak position
Ireland (IRMA)	30
UK Singles (OCC)	50

== Certifications ==
Region	Certification	Certified units/sales
New Zealand (RMNZ)	Gold	15,000^{‡}
United Kingdom (BPI)	Silver	200,000^{‡}
^{‡} Sales+streaming figures based on certification alone.
