= Super Ultra =

Mixtape by Charli XCX
- Released: 7 November 2012
- Length: 24:00
- Label: Self-released
- Producers: J£zus Million; Art of Noise; Giraffage; Sinjin Hawke; Baths; Jackson; How to Dress Well; Jakwob

Charli XCX chronology
Heartbreaks and Earthquakes (2012)	Super Ultra (2012)	True Romance (2013)

Singles from Super Ultra
- 1. "Cloud Aura" Released: 31 October 2012

Super Ultra is the second mixtape by British singer Charli XCX, independently released on 7 November 2012. It was made available for free online streaming and download via YouTube, SoundCloud, and her official website.

== Promotion ==
Charli XCX released her second mixtape, Super Ultra, on 7 November 2012, which included the lead single "Cloud Aura" featuring Brooke Candy alongside remixes and songs built around production from artists such as Baths, Sinjin Hawke, and Jakwob. The accompanying music video for "Cloud Aura", directed and recut by Ryan Andrews, was released in the same month. It combines black-and-white found footage from various films and television programs, including The Hills, Casablanca, Carrie, and Here Comes Honey Boo Boo. It also features Lauren Conrad and Zooey Deschanel.

== Critical reception ==
Professional ratings
Review scores
Source	Rating
Pitchfork	5.0/10

Miles Raymer of Pitchfork called it "an interesting, if not always successful experiment" with "a few bright moments", concluding that it is "a compelling argument for letting these kind of pop stars off the leash". Consequence felt that the mixtape has a "manic stride" and described it as "a candy-coated hit of molly, a pupil-dilating emotional explosion, a puzzling burst of Grimes-y weirdo soul".

== Track listing ==
Super Ultra track listing
No.	Title	Writer(s)	Producer(s)	Length
1.	"Cloud Aura" (featuring Brooke Candy)	Charlotte Aitchison; Brooke Candy	J£zus Million	2:45
2.	"Moments in Love"	Aitchison	Art of Noise	1:40
3.	"Velvet Dreaming (Luv)"	Aitchison	Giraffage	3:35
4.	"Dance 4 U"	Aitchison	Sinjin Hawke	3:45
5.	"Glow"	Aitchison	Baths	2:55
6.	"Heatwave"	How to Dress Well; Aitchison	Jackson	2:13
7.	"Cold Nites" (remix)	Aitchison; Brooke Candy	How to Dress Well; Forest Swords; Rodaidh McDonald	3:36
8.	"Forgiveness"	Aitchison	Jakwob	3:35
Total length:				24:00

Notes

- "Cloud Nites" (Remix) is a remix of an original song by How to Dress Well.
