= Ryan Andrews (director) =

Award-winning British feature film/music video director

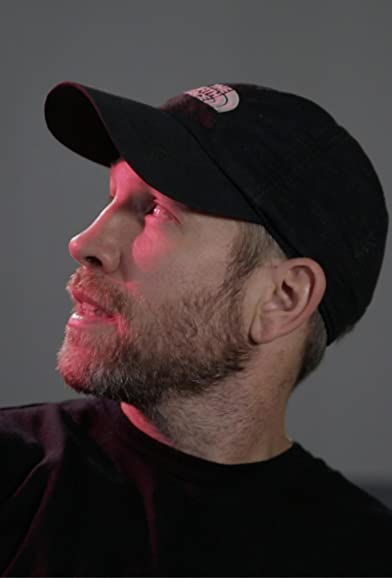
- Ryan Andrews (2023)
- Born: Ryan Andrews; 8 October 1981 (age 44); Ceredigion, Wales
- Education: London Film School
- Occupations: Film director; music video director; production designer
- Spouse: Samantha Chapman
- Website: directorryanandrews.me

Ryan Andrews (born 8 October 1981) is a Welsh film director and writer. He is best known for directing the film Elfie Hopkins, and music videos for Charli XCX, Olivia Holt and numerous other pop artists.

== Career ==
Andrews grew up in New Quay, Ceredigion, Wales.

Andrews directed a short film titled Jerusalem. It is named for the work of the same name by artist William Blake, and is based on an unsuccessful exhibit held by the artist in Soho, London in 1809. The short examines how Blake was largely unrecognized and criticized during his time. Jerusalem stars Ray Winstone as William Blake, and Amanda Drew as his wife Catherine Blake. The screenplay was written by Philippa Goslett. The film was exhibited in the Tate Briton as part of the William Blake retrospective.

Andrews later directed a mini-series titled BeastHunters, which premiered on BBC Comedy upon its online launch. It stars James Corden, Jaime Winstone, and Robert Llewellyn.

Andrews' first feature film, Elfie Hopkins, was theatrically released in 2012 in the UK. It was released in the US in 2013 under the alternative title of Elfie Hopkins: Cannibal Hunter. Elfie Hopkins is a horror film surrounding a young aspiring detective who investigates her cannibalistic neighbors. For the film, Andrews chose to expand on the theme of cannibalism from his previous short film Little Munchkin. It was also inspired by Andrews' childhood dream of being a vampire hunter. The film stars Jaime Winstone and her father Ray Winstone. It was filmed in Ceredigion, Wales, where Andrews grew up.

Between 2012 and 2019 Andrews directed various music videos for different musicians. His most frequent collaborator has been Charli XCX, for whom he has directed ten music videos in total. After being approached by Warner Bros. and Atlantic Records, Andrews worked as Charli's visual director for several years — directing the music videos associated with her album True Romance. He has described his work with Charli as "taking Tumblr and internet art to the mainstream". Andrews has also directed music videos for Banks, Transviolet, Olivia Holt, Martine McCutcheon, and Jetta, among others. He directed the visuals for Little Mix's 2017 Glory Days tour. His commercial work includes brands such as Urban Outfitters, Red Bull Catwalk, Elliss and collaborations with I-D Magazine, Hunger Magazine and other leading editorials.

In 2022 Andrews directed the science fiction short film titled Hiraeth., The film was written by Stephen Laughton. Starring Olivia Ross and Jonathan Forbes, and tells the fictional story of a crewed mission to Europa. The film won multiple awards, including best director at SSFFF and best screenplay at Rhode Island International Film Festival Vortex Sci-Fi and Fantasy Award.

In 2023 Andrews wrote and director the cosmic horror short "Water", co-written by Stephen Laughton, starring Gethin Anthony, Olivia Ross and Tom Canton. Water premiered at Chicago Horror Film Festival in 2024.

== Filmography ==
=== Feature films ===
Director

- Elfie Hopkins (2012)
- One Night (2026)

Production designer

Year	Title	Notes	Ref.
2005	Mrs Henderson Presents	Assistant role	
2009	Gangster Exchange		

=== Short films ===
Director

Year	Title	Notes	Ref.
2003	Fangula		
2009	Family Picnic	Featured in the BBC Two series Made in Wales	
2010	Jerusalem		
2010	Little Munchkin		
2011	I'm Your Man	Fashion film for i-D Magazine	
2012	Black	Fashion films for brand Sorapol	
2012	White	Fashion films for brand Sorapol	
2015	Astrid Andersen x A$AP Ferg – Water	Fashion film for brand Astrid Andersen	
2016	Love Birds		
2016	Elliss	Fashion film for brand Elliss	
2022	Hiraeth	Award Winning Short Film	
2023	"Water"	Cosmic Horror short film	

=== Television ===
Director

Year	Title	Notes	Ref.
2010	BeastHunters	Two-part miniseries for BBC Comedy	

=== Music videos ===
Director

Year	Title	Artist(s)	Ref.
2007	"Boogaloo"	Dead Residents and Optimas Prime	
2008	"Scumbongo"	Dead Residents	
2011	"Nuclear Seasons"	Charli XCX	
2012	"You're the One (Odd Future's The Internet feat. Mike G Remix)"	Charli XCX	
2012	"So Far Away (Princess Video Remix)"	Charli XCX	
2012	"Cloud Aura"	Charli XCX (featuring Brooke Candy)	
2013	"Work"	Banks (featuring Lil Silva)	
2013	"You (Ha Ha Ha)"	Charli XCX	
2013	"Waking Up Dead"	Eyes on Film	
2013	"What I Like"	Charli XCX	
2013	"Live in the Speaker"	Mercedes	
2013	"Take My Hand"	Charli XCX	
2013	"The Legendary Children"	I Am a Camera	
2013	"SuperLove"	Charli XCX	
2013	"SuperLove (Yeasayer Remix)"	Charli XCX	
2013	"SuperLove (Canblaster Remix)"	Charli XCX	
2015	"Angel Eyes"	Bo Rocha	
2015	"Mojito"	Kayla	
2016	"New Bohemia"	Transviolet	
2016	"I Heard Love"	IV Rox	
2016	"History"	Olivia Holt	
2017	The Glory Days Tour visuals	Little Mix	
2017	"Say I'm Not Alone"	Martine McCutcheon	
2018	"Hangin'"	Jetta	
2018	"Losing Control"	Jetta	
2018	"Fool"	Jetta	
2019	"A Lot to Give"	Iris Gold	

=== Awards ===
2009 Won, BBC - It's My Shout, Best Director

2022 Won, SSFFF Award BEST DIRECTOR (Short Film) for Hiraeth. The Machine

2022 Berlin Sci-fi Film fest Nominated, Best Short Film. Hiraeth. The Machine

2022 Won, LASCIFI, Leviathan Award - Platinum Leviathan Award for Best Short Film for Hiraeth. The Machine

2022 Won Lonely Wolf International Film Festival, Festival Award Best Sci-Fi/Fantasy Film of the Year for Hiraeth. The Machine

2022 Nominated, Lonely Wolf International Festival Award Outstanding Achievement in Production Design for Hiraeth. The Machine

2022 Norwich Film Festival, UK Nominated, Best Short Film Best East Anglian Short for Hiraeth. The Machine

2022 Won Roma Short Film Festival, Best Sci Fi Best Sci Fi for Hiraeth (2022)The Machine

2022 Sydney Science Fiction Film Festival Nominated, SSFFF Award Best Short Film for Hiraeth. The Machine

2022 Tokyo International Film Festival Nominated, Short Films Main Competition Best Sci Fi for Hiraeth. The Machine

|
