= Chains of Love (Charli XCX song) =

Single by Charli XCX

from the album Wuthering Heights
- Released: 13 November 2025
- Genre: Synth-pop; electropop
- Length: 2:50
- Label: Atlantic
- Songwriters: Charlotte Aitchison; Finn Keane; Justin Raisen
- Producers: Finn Keane; Justin Raisen

Charli XCX singles chronology
"House" (2025)	"Chains of Love" (2025)	"Wall of Sound" (2026)

Music video
- "Chains of Love" on YouTube

"Chains of Love" is a song by British singer Charli XCX. It was released to the public on 13 November 2025 through Atlantic Records with an accompanying music video released four days later. Produced in collaboration with British songwriter and producer Finn Keane (formerly known as Easyfun), the song is the second single of her soundtrack album, Wuthering Heights (2026).

== Background ==
In late 2024, Charli XCX was approached by British filmmaker Emerald Fennell to write a song for her upcoming film adaptation of Wuthering Heights (1847). Rather than composing one piece, Charli XCX and her collaborator Finn Keane created multiple compositions inspired by the screenplay and film's aesthetic, ultimately developing into a full twelve-track companion album for the film. Work on the album was done throughout 2025, where the two would rent out studios on the road during Charli XCX's touring schedule.

== Release and promotion ==
On 13 November 2025, Charli XCX announced the release "Chains of Love", the second single from her soundtrack album Wuthering Heights. Four days later, she would announce the release of her music video for the song.

== Critical reception ==
"Chains of Love" was featured in Rolling Stone's "Songs You Need to Know".

== Charts ==
=== Weekly charts ===
Weekly chart performance
Chart (2025–2026)	Peak position
Australia (ARIA)	55
Canada Hot 100 (Billboard)	72
Costa Rica Anglo Airplay (Monitor Latino)	11
Czech Republic Singles Digital (ČNS IFPI)	77
Estonia Airplay (TopHit)	79
Germany Airplay (BVMI)	87
Global 200 (Billboard)	96
Greece International (IFPI)	38
Ireland (IRMA)	15
Japan Hot Overseas (Billboard Japan)	18
Lithuania (AGATA)	76
Lithuania Airplay (TopHit)	31
New Zealand Hot Singles (RMNZ)	4
Norway (VG-lista)	79
Peru Anglo Airplay (Monitor Latino)	12
Slovakia Singles Digital (ČNS IFPI)	74
Sweden Heatseeker (Sverigetopplistan)	1
UK Singles (Official Charts)	12
US Billboard Hot 100	87

=== Monthly charts ===
Monthly chart performance
Chart (2025)	Peak position
Lithuania Airplay (TopHit)	47

== Certifications ==
Certifications for "Chains of Love"
Region	Certification	Certified units/sales
United Kingdom (BPI)	Silver	200,000^{‡}
^{‡} Sales+streaming figures based on certification alone.
