= Ryn Weaver =

American pop singer

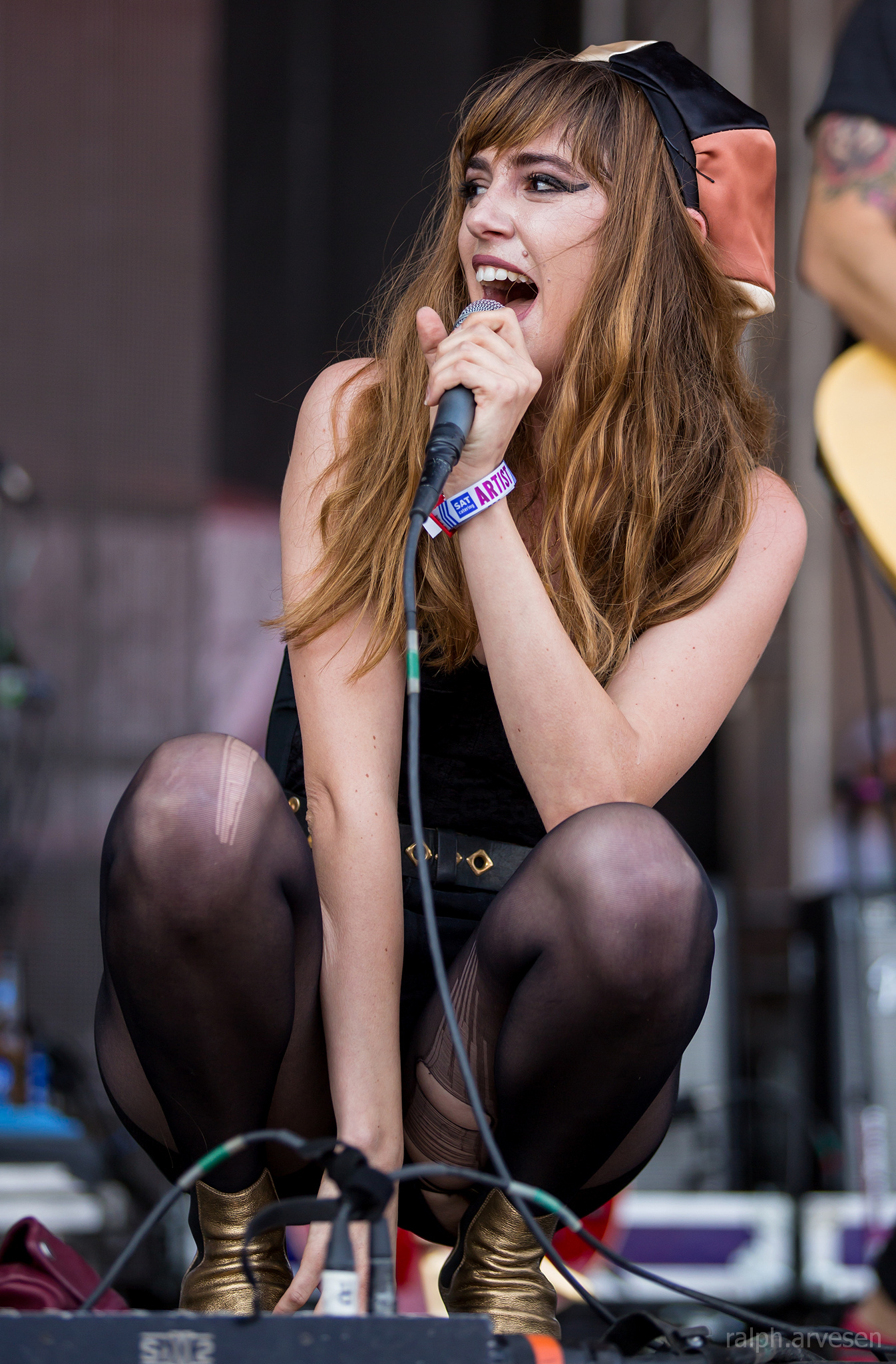
- Weaver performing in 2015

Background information
- Also known as: Aryn Wüthrich
- Born: Erin Wüthrich; August 10, 1992 (age 34); Encinitas, California, U.S.
- Origin: San Diego, California, U.S.
- Genres: Pop; synth-pop; indie pop; alternative pop
- Occupations: Singer; songwriter
- Years active: 2013–present
- Labels: Mad Love; Interscope; Neon Gold

Aryn Wüthrich (née Erin Wüthrich; born August 10, 1992), better known under her stage name Ryn Weaver, is an American pop singer-songwriter who first garnered attention with the single "OctaHate" in June 2014, with Billboard calling the single a viral sensation. Her debut studio album, The Fool, followed in 2015. She has also co-written songs for other artists, including JoJo's "When Love Hurts" (2015), and BTS and Charli XCX's "Dream Glow" (2019).

== Early life ==
Ryn Weaver was born as Erin Wüthrich in Encinitas, California, to Maxwell "Max" Wüthrich, an architect, and Cynthia (née Weaver). She has Irish, Swiss, German, and Ukrainian ancestry. She has three brothers; Parker, Taylor, and Christopher. Weaver has stated that at a young age she chose to change the spelling of her name, Erin, to Aryn, claiming the original spelling was "ordinary and didn't suit [her]". The rest of her stage name, Weaver, is her mother's maiden name. She spent years learning different art forms including musical theater, painting, acting as well as music at Canyon Crest Academy in San Diego. Weaver moved to New York City for college to pursue her acting career where she attended New York University's Tisch School of the Arts before dropping out. She then moved back to California.

== Career ==
Weaver met producer Benny Blanco briefly in New York. A few years later they reconnected at Blanco's birthday party through a mutual friend in Los Angeles. Blanco signed Weaver to his imprint under Interscope Records, Friends Keep Secrets.

On June 21, 2014, Weaver posted her single "OctaHate" on her SoundCloud account and within hours it received attention from many artists including Charli XCX, Charlie Puth, Harry Styles, Jessie Ware and Hayley Williams of Paramore. The song also reached number one on Billboard Emerging Artists Chart on June 25, 2014.

On August 12, 2014, Weaver's debut EP, Promises was released as a digital download. Weaver's debut studio album, entitled The Fool, was released on June 16, 2015, through Mad Love and Interscope Records. It sold 13,800 units in its first week. Weaver performed at Lollapalooza on August 1, 2015. She performed at Billboard's first ever Hot 100 Festival on August 23, 2015.

On September 14, 2018, Neon Gold released Weaver's demo single titled "Reasons Not to Die". This was her first song in three years since The Fool.

Weaver released a single titled "Odin St." on June 16, 2025—the 10th anniversary of The Fool—and confirmed she's working on a sophomore album. This was followed by a second single, “Rorschach Baby”, released on August 8, 2025.

== Discography ==
=== Studio albums ===
List of studio albums, with selected chart positions
Title	Details	Peak chart positions		
Title	Details	US	US Alt.	US Digital
The Fool	Released: June 16, 2015; Label: Interscope, Mad Love; Format: CD, digital download, LP	30	7	8

=== Extended plays ===
Title	Details	Peak chart positions	
Title	Details	US	US Heat
Promises	Release date: August 8, 2014; Label: Interscope, Friends Keep Secrets; Formats: CD, digital download, EP	105	1

=== Singles ===
Title	Year	Peak chart positions		Certifications	Album
Title	Year	US Bubbling Under	US Pop	Certifications	Album
"OctaHate"	2014	3	27	RIAA: Gold	The Fool
"Promises"	2015	—	—	—	The Fool
"Odin St"	2025	—	—	—	TBA
"Rorschach Baby"	2025	—	—	—	TBA

=== Promotional singles ===
Title	Year	Album
"The Fool"	2015	The Fool
"Travelling Song"	2015	The Fool
"Reasons Not to Die" (Demo)	2018	NGX: Ten Years of Neon Gold

=== Other charted songs ===
Title	Year	Peak chart positions		Certifications	Album
Title	Year	IRE	UK	Certifications	Album
"Pierre"	2015	30	50	BPI: Silver; RIAA: Gold	The Fool

=== Songwriting ===
List of songs written or co-written for other artists, showing year released and album name
Title	Year	Artist(s)	Album
"When Love Hurts"	2015	JoJo	III
"Naked"	2016	Wilder Green	Non-album single
"Dream Glow"	2019	BTS & Charli XCX	BTS World (Original Soundtrack)
"Honeybee"	2019	The Head and the Heart	Living Mirage
"Let Me Know"	2020	Winona Oak	Closure (EP)
"Just for Me"	2021	Saint Jhn with SZA	Space Jam: A New Legacy
"Rage"	2022	The Big Pink	The Love That's Ours

== Filmography ==
Title	Year	Role	Notes
SIRENS	2013	Sara (as Aryn Wuthrich)	Short Film (18min)
Kill Her, Not Me	2013	Margo (as Aryn Wuthrich)	Feature Film (1hr 23min)
CSI: Crime Scene Investigation	2013	Sheila / Detoxing Woman (as Aryn Wuthrich)	Television Series (2000–2015) 13x22 – "Skin in the Game"
The Adventures of Lewis & Clark	2013	E-Wuth (as Erin Wuthrich)	Web Series (2013) 1x02 – "Get Real Laid" 1x04 – "Casting for the Couch"
The Bright Side	2013	Hazel Kelly (as Aryn Wuthrich) Performer: "So Far" "Start to Begin" "Crossfire" "Mr. Brightside" "Shadows for Sunshine"	Short Film (36min)
At the Maple Grove	2014	Noelle (as Aryn Wuthrich)	Feature Film (1hr 50min)
The Tonight Show Starring Jimmy Fallon	2015	Herself – Musical Guest Performer: "Promises" Writer: "When Love Hurts" "Promises"	Television Series (2014- ) 2x171 – "Vince Vaughn/Jim Gaffigan/Ryn Weaver" 3x055 – "Harrison Ford/Seth MacFarlane/JoJo"
Late Show with David Letterman	2015	Herself – Musical Guest	Television Series (1993–2015) 22x77 – "Amanda Peet/Simon Helberg/Ryn Weaver"
Charli XCX: The F-Word and Me	2015	Herself	Television Documentary (45min)
