= SuperLove =

Single by Charli XCX
- Released: 2 December 2013
- Recorded: 2013
- Genre: Electropop; glo-fi
- Length: 3:12
- Label: Asylum
- Songwriters: Charlotte Aitchison; Patrik Berger
- Producer: Patrik Berger

Charli XCX singles chronology
"What I Like" (2013)	"SuperLove" (2013)	"Fancy" (2014)

Music video
- "SuperLove" on YouTube

"SuperLove" is a song by British singer Charli XCX, released as a single on 2 December 2013. Although the song was originally announced as the lead single from Charli XCX's then-untitled second studio album, it ultimately was not included on 2014's Sucker. The single reached number 62 on the UK Singles Chart, becoming Charli XCX's first solo entry on the chart.

== Background ==
According to Charli XCX, "SuperLove" is a song about "running away and falling in love with someone and it being really dangerous and bad for you but still amazing, romantic and wonderful [...] 'SuperLove' is the best drug and this song is about overdosing on it and falling in real deep."

After being announced by Charli XCX that the song would not appear on her sophomore studio album Sucker, a track listing was released online by Warner Music Group of the Japanese edition of the album, which featured "SuperLove" along with two other bonus tracks. This track listing was later changed, removing "SuperLove" and including the European bonus track "Red Balloon".

== Critical reception ==
Robert Copsey of Digital Spy gave "SuperLove" four out of five stars, stating that the track "more than lives up to its ambitious billing. 'You're whisky, wasted and beautiful dancing through the fire/ You're such a vision to see,' she sings over a jaunty guitar line, swirling electronics and addictive cheerleader claps before unleashing a tongue-twister of a chorus that immediately knocks you over the head and commands you to dance along and given Charli's current ambitious mindset, who are we to argue with her?". Following the release of her 2022 album Crash, Consequence ranked the song as Charli XCX's eighth best song.

== Music video ==
The accompanying music video for "SuperLove", directed by Ryan Andrews, was filmed in Tokyo and premiered on 26 September 2013, months before the digital single release. The video shows Charli XCX performing the song in a room covered in multi-coloured lights and dancing with robots.

== Track listings ==
- Digital download
1. "SuperLove" – 3:13
- Digital download – Remixes
1. "SuperLove" (Yeasayer Remix) – 3:53
2. "SuperLove" (Canblaster Remix) – 3:15
3. "SuperLove" (Mike Mago Remix) – 3:05

== Charts ==
Chart performance for "SuperLove"
Chart (2013)	Peak position
CIS Airplay (TopHit)	177
UK Singles (Official Charts)	62

== Release history ==
Release dates and formats for "SuperLove"
Region	Date	Format(s)	Label	Ref.
Ireland	2 December 2013	Digital download – Remixes	Asylum	
United Kingdom	2 December 2013	Digital download – Remixes	Asylum	
Ireland	6 December 2013	Digital download	Asylum	
United Kingdom	8 December 2013	Digital download	Asylum	
