= Wuthering Heights (2026 film) =

2026 film by Emerald Fennell

- Theatrical release poster
- Directed by: Emerald Fennell
- Screenplay by: Emerald Fennell
- Based on: Wuthering Heights by Emily Brontë
- Produced by: Emerald Fennell; Josey McNamara; Margot Robbie
- Starring: Margot Robbie; Jacob Elordi; Hong Chau; Shazad Latif; Alison Oliver; Martin Clunes; Ewan Mitchell
- Cinematography: Linus Sandgren
- Edited by: Victoria Boydell
- Music by: Anthony Willis (score); Charli XCX (songs)
- Production companies: MRC; LuckyChap Entertainment; Lie Still
- Distributed by: Warner Bros. Pictures
- Release dates: January 28, 2026 (Grauman's Chinese Theatre); February 13, 2026 (United Kingdom and United States)
- Running time: 136 minutes
- Countries: United Kingdom; United States
- Language: English
- Budget: $80 million
- Box office: $241.7 million

Wuthering Heights (stylized with quotation marks) is a 2026 romantic period drama film produced, written and directed by Emerald Fennell. Loosely based on the 1847 novel by Emily Brontë, the film is a reinterpretation intended by Fennell to "recreate the feeling of a teenage girl reading this book for the first time". Margot Robbie and Jacob Elordi respectively star as Catherine Earnshaw and Heathcliff, alongside Hong Chau, Shazad Latif, Alison Oliver, Martin Clunes, and Ewan Mitchell in supporting roles.

Wuthering Heights premiered at the Grauman's Chinese Theatre in Los Angeles, California on January 28, 2026, and was released in the United Kingdom and United States by Warner Bros. Pictures on February 13. The film received mixed reviews from critics, but it was a box office success, grossing $242 million worldwide against a production budget of $80 million.

== Plot ==
In 19th-century England Mr. Earnshaw returns to his estate of Wuthering Heights on the Yorkshire Moors with a young boy he rescued off the streets, whom he introduces to his daughter, Cathy, and her companion, Nelly Dean. Cathy becomes protective of the boy and names him "Heathcliff". As time goes on, the pair become inseparable.

By the time Cathy and Heathcliff have reached adulthood, Wuthering Heights has fallen into disrepair due to Mr. Earnshaw's worsening alcoholism and gambling habits. Cathy plans to court her new neighbor, wealthy textile merchant Edgar Linton, to escape Wuthering Heights' bleak environment and help bring the lowly servant Heathcliff into high society, though Heathcliff is jealous and disapproves. The situation becomes more complicated when Cathy and Heathcliff begin to realise that they have fallen in love with each other, although Cathy initially shuns the idea of becoming romantically involved with Heathcliff and continues to pursue Edgar.

One day Cathy sprains her ankle while spying on Edgar and his ward, Isabella, and is taken in at their home for six weeks to heal. Edgar is smitten by Cathy and proposes marriage, which she accepts. While expressing to Nelly her guilt over choosing Edgar over Heathcliff, Cathy implies Nelly would not understand because she "never loved anyone" and no one loves her. Provoked, Nelly bitterly manipulates Cathy into saying that marrying Heathcliff would degrade her, so that it would be secretly overheard by him outside. Heathcliff leaves before he hears Cathy confess her love for him and her belief in their connection, wrongly believing that Cathy does not care for him, and then leaves Wuthering Heights, riding away secretly. By the next day, Cathy has changed her mind about marrying Edgar, but it is too late as Heathcliff has already left. Cathy is devastated by his departure and initially refuses to accept that he could have left her.

A year later Cathy has given up hope that Heathcliff will come back and decides to go through with the marriage to Edgar after all. After the wedding, she lives a lavish lifestyle with her husband at their home, Thrushcross Grange, but secretly longs to be reunited with Heathcliff again. In time, Cathy becomes pregnant with Edgar's child. Soon after Cathy learns of her pregnancy, Heathcliff finally returns, five years after his departure, and is now well-groomed and wealthy. Rather than being happy to see Cathy, he is bitter and angry over her decision to marry Edgar and considers marrying Isabella to make Cathy jealous. He purchases Wuthering Heights from Mr. Earnshaw, who dies soon after. Following this, Heathcliff consoles Cathy and they reconnect, beginning an intense romantic and sexual affair.

After Cathy realizes Nelly knew Heathcliff was listening when Cathy said marrying him would degrade her, she tries to banish Nelly from the Grange. Nelly then reveals the affair to Edgar, who forbids Cathy from seeing Heathcliff. Cathy later reveals her pregnancy to Heathcliff, who claims to not mind before having sex with her. He offers to kill Edgar, which Cathy rejects, and she dismisses him. Furious, Heathcliff enters into a loveless, BDSM relationship with Isabella, who understands Heathcliff's motivations and agrees to elope with him. Following the marriage, Heathcliff degrades Isabella and treats her like a dog, which Nelly witnesses when she visits them at Wuthering Heights.

Depressed over Heathcliff marrying Isabella, Cathy locks herself in her room and starves herself. Heathcliff tries to stay connected to Cathy by secretly sending her love letters while she is isolated and growing weaker, but Nelly intercepts them, letting Cathy think Heathcliff has abandoned her. Her pregnancy eventually results in a miscarriage which becomes septicemic. When Nelly realizes how serious Cathy's situation is, she returns to Wuthering Heights to rescue Isabella and to reveal to Heathcliff that Cathy is dying. Heathcliff frantically rides to the Grange on horseback, only to find when he arrives that Cathy has already died. Heathcliff then holds Cathy's dead body and begs her to drive him insane and not give him peace as long as he should live.

== Cast ==
- Margot Robbie as Catherine "Cathy" Earnshaw
  - Charlotte Mellington as young Cathy
- Jacob Elordi as Heathcliff
  - Owen Cooper as young Heathcliff
- Hong Chau as Nelly Dean
  - Vy Nguyen as young Nelly
- Shazad Latif as Edgar Linton
- Alison Oliver as Isabella Linton
- Martin Clunes as Mr. Earnshaw
- Ewan Mitchell as Joseph
- Amy Morgan as Zillah
- Jessica Knappett as Mrs. Burton
- Millie Kent as Jane
- Vicki Pepperdine as Sister Mercy
- Paul Rhys as Heathcliff's father

== Production ==
=== Development and casting ===
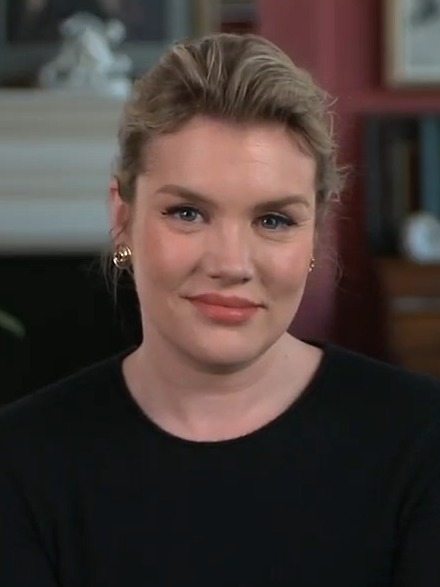
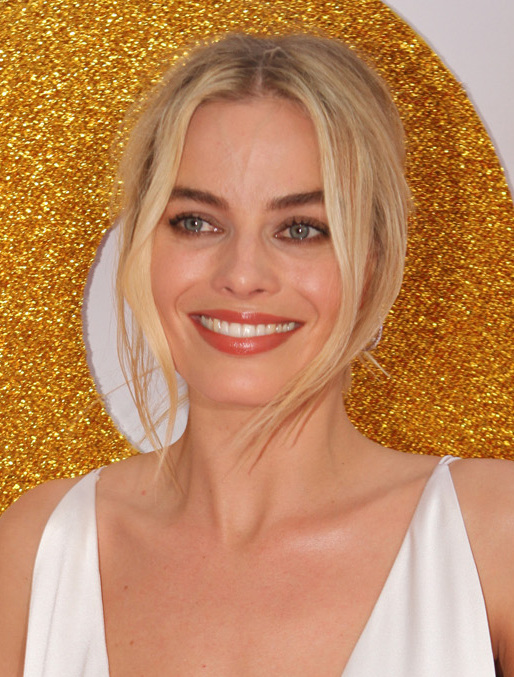
Writer–director Emerald Fennell and actress Margot Robbie also produced the film.

In July 2024, filmmaker Emerald Fennell announced that she would write and direct an adaptation of the 1847 novel Wuthering Heights by Emily Brontë. In September 2024, Margot Robbie and Jacob Elordi were cast as Catherine Earnshaw and Heathcliff, respectively, with Robbie also producing under her label LuckyChap Entertainment alongside financer MRC. Robbie previously produced Fennell's Promising Young Woman (2020) and Saltburn (2023), the latter of which starred Elordi. For her approach to adapting Brontë's novel, Fennell decided against a faithful retelling of its story, stating that her main intention was to "try and recreate the feeling of a teenage girl reading this book for the first time".

A bidding war in October led Netflix to bid $150 million for the distribution rights. Warner Bros. Pictures, with whom LuckyChap has a first-look deal and made Barbie (2023), ultimately won the rights with a significantly lower offer of $80 million after granting Fennell and Robbie's wishes for the film to have a theatrical release and a significant marketing campaign.

Elordi had been contemplating taking a hiatus from acting before Fennell offered him the lead role without having to audition. The decision to cast a white actor as the racially ambiguous Heathcliff, described as a "dark-skinned gipsy" or "Lascar" in the novel, sparked controversy, though Heathcliff provenance is never clearly stated, a "China princess" is cited in the novel as a possible mother and he is called a "Spanish castaway", more to generate confusion about the mysteryous byronic hero, and manifest the remoteness of the village by showing how little they know of the world, than to state an actual ethnicity. In September 2025, Fennell defended her decision to cast the Basque-ascending actor Elordi, stating that he "looked exactly like the illustration of Heathcliff on the first book that I read." In November 2024, Hong Chau, Alison Oliver (who starred in Saltburn), and Shazad Latif joined the cast. In March 2025, Charlotte Mellington, Owen Cooper, and Vy Nguyen (all three making their film debuts) were announced as playing young Catherine, Heathcliff, and Nelly.

=== Filming ===
Principal photography took place in the United Kingdom during 50 days, from mid-January to late March 2025. Swedish cinematographer Linus Sandgren shot the film using 35mm and VistaVision cameras, marking his second collaboration with Fennell following Saltburn (2023). Sandgren framed the film in the 1.85:1 aspect ratio, using 3-perf 35mm Aaton Penelopes as the main cameras, plus a pair of Beaumont 8-perf VistaVision cameras for wides and landscapes.

Filming occurred at Sky Studios Elstree, with location shooting on Bridestones Moor above the Pennine town of Todmorden, West Yorkshire, and the Yorkshire Dales including the valleys of Arkengarthdale and Swaledale, the village of Low Row, and the Yorkshire Dales National Park. During the first week of filming, Elordi accidentally gave himself a second degree burn when he stepped back against a steaming hot brass knob while taking a shower and had to go to the hospital.

=== Music ===
Anthony Willis composed the score for the film, after having worked with Fennell on Saltburn, with Charli XCX contributing an album of original songs. The lead single, "House" featuring Welsh musician John Cale, was released on November 10, 2025, alongside a music video directed by Mitch Ryan. A second song, "Chains of Love", was released on November 13, coinciding with the film's theatrical trailer, which also featured the song. Two further singles were released, "Wall of Sound" on January 16, 2026, and "Always Everywhere" on February 13, the same day as the album.

=== Influences ===
In preparation for creating Wuthering Heights, Fennell rewatched some of her "favorite 'love stories', ones that challenged, subverted, even obliterated the conventions of the genre". The films listed by Fennell as influences for Wuthering Heights were Random Harvest (1942), A Matter of Life and Death (1946), Far from the Madding Crowd (1967), Donkey Skin (1970), The Night Porter (1974), Bram Stoker's Dracula (1992), Crash (1996), Romeo + Juliet (1996), The End of the Affair (1999), Romance (1999), Bluebeard (2009), The Handmaiden (2016), and The Beguiled (2017).

== Marketing ==
The film's first trailer and poster, the latter of which paid homage to Gone with the Wind (1939), were released online on September 3, 2025, after promotional billboards appeared in multiple cities, including New York City, London, and Los Angeles. The film's title treatment was designed by Chips, a design studio based in Brooklyn, New York. It is based on a poster from an earlier adaptation, Wuthering Heights (1920), starring Milton Rosmer.

The film's title is stylized with quotation marks. Fennell stated that "any adaptation of a novel" should be enclosed in quotation marks: "The thing for me is that you can't adapt a book as dense and complicated and difficult as this book. I can't say I'm making Wuthering Heights. It's not possible. What I can say is I'm making a version of it." On January 20, 2026, Elordi and Robbie were announced as the cover stars of Vogue Australia's February 2026 issue.

== Release ==
=== Theatrical ===
On January 28, 2026, Wuthering Heights had its world premiere at the Grauman's Chinese Theatre. Wuthering Heights was released in the United States and the United Kingdom on February 13, 2026, on the eve of Valentine's Day. It is slated to release in IMAX cinemas.

=== Home media ===
Wuthering Heights was released on digital streaming on March 31, 2026, and on 4K Ultra HD Blu-ray, Blu-ray, and DVD on May 5, 2026.

== Reception ==
=== Box office ===
Wuthering Heights grossed $84 million in the United States and Canada, and $158 million in other territories, for a worldwide total of $242 million. Variety estimated the film would turn a profit of around $40 million for Warner Bros.

In the United States and Canada, Wuthering Heights was released alongside Crime 101, Good Luck, Have Fun, Don't Die, and Goat, and was projected to gross $50–55 million from 3,600 theaters in its four-day opening weekend. The film grossed $11 million on its first day, including $3 million in previews. It went on to debut at $37.5 million over the four-day Presidents' Day weekend, topping the box office but finishing below expectations. In its second weekend, the film grossed $14.2 million domestically, finishing second place behind Goat.

=== Critical response ===
Metacritic review
breakdown (unweighted)

Positive
23 (39%)
Mixed
29 (49%)
Negative
7 (12%)

Wuthering Heights was met with mixed reviews from critics. On the review aggregator website Rotten Tomatoes, 57% of 357 critics' reviews are positive, with an average rating of 6.1/10. The website's consensus reads: "Liberally adapting Emily Brontë's classic story with a heavy dose of carnality and chic stylization, Emerald Fennell's Wuthering Heights might not be the stuff of high literature but it is a visually vibrant pleasure." Metacritic, which uses a weighted average, assigned the film a score of 55 out of 100, based on 59 critics, indicating "mixed or average" reviews. Audiences polled by CinemaScore gave the film an average grade of "B" on an A+ to F scale.

David Sims of The Atlantic called Wuthering Heights a "heaving, rip-snortingly carnal good time". By contrast, Peter Bradshaw of The Guardian described the film as "an emotionally hollow, bodice-ripping misfire". Mick LaSalle of the San Francisco Chronicle concluded, "Fennell boxes herself in. By giving Cathy and Heathcliff an intense sex life, she gets them ready for the next step, but there can't be [one], because this is Wuthering Heights. [...] So she gives away all the story's power of spiritual and sexual longing without gaining a thing." Barry Hertz of The Globe and Mail stated that "no amount of meticulously composed shots trained on aspic-entombed prawns or freakishly large glazed strawberries can distract from the gaping holes in absolutely everything else on the screen, including its frequently drenched stars". Sarah Chihaya of The Nation wrote that the film ignored "the novel's very real and present concerns with class, race, and heredity". Caryn James of the BBC wrote, "Fennell drops in some comic moments, and at times dares to be over the top. [...] but its excesses are a small price to pay for such ambition. However much Fennell toys with the details – and why not? the book still exists – she captures the essential enduring passion of Wuthering Heights and its class-bound time."

=== Accolades ===
Award	Date of ceremony	Category	Recipient(s)	Result	Ref.
American Music Awards	May 25, 2026	Best Soundtrack	Wuthering Heights (Charli XCX)	Nominated	
Astra Midseason Movie Awards	June 30, 2026	Best Actress	Margot Robbie	Nominated	
Astra Midseason Movie Awards	June 30, 2026	Best Supporting Actress	Alison Oliver	Nominated	
Golden Trailer Awards	May 28, 2026	Best Drama TV Spot	"Greatest" (Warner Bros. Pictures / Giaronomo LLC)	Nominated	
Golden Trailer Awards	May 28, 2026	Best Original Score	"Dream" (Warner Bros. Pictures / Wild Card Creative Group)	Nominated	
Golden Trailer Awards	May 28, 2026	Best Romance	"Drive Me Mad" (Warner Bros. Pictures / Seismic Productions)	Nominated	
Golden Trailer Awards	May 28, 2026	Best Romance	"Everything" (Warner Bros. Pictures / Wild Card Creative Group)	Won	
Golden Trailer Awards	May 28, 2026	Best Teaser	"Everything" (Warner Bros. Pictures / Wild Card Creative Group)	Nominated	
Golden Trailer Awards	May 28, 2026	Best Viral Campaign for a Feature Film	Social Campaign (Warner Bros. Pictures / Buddha Jones)	Nominated	
Golden Trailer Awards	May 28, 2026	Most Original Trailer	"Everything" (Warner Bros. Pictures / Wild Card Creative Group)	Won	
Grammy Awards	February 7, 2027	Best Song Written for Visual Media	“House” – Charli XCX,John Cale & Charlotte Aitchison	Pending	
Grammy Awards	February 7, 2027	Best Compilation Soundtrack for Visual Media	Charli XCX	Pending	
Guild of Music Supervisors Awards	February 28, 2026	Best Music Supervision in a Trailer (Film)	Deric Berberabe and Jordan Silverberg ("Official Teaser")	Nominated	
Hollywood Music in Media Awards	November 18, 2026	Best Music Supervision – Film	Nicolette Di Dia	Nominated	
Hollywood Music in Media Awards	November 18, 2026	Best Original Song – Feature Film	"House" – Charlotte Aitchison, John Cale, Finn Keane, and Nathan Klein	Nominated	
World Soundtrack Awards	October 10, 2026	Best Original Song	"House" – Charlotte Aitchison, John Cale, Finn Keane, and Nathan Klein	Nominated	
