= The Fool (Ryn Weaver album) =

Studio album by Ryn Weaver
- Released: June 16, 2015
- Recorded: 2014–15
- Genre: Indie pop
- Label: Mad Love; Interscope
- Producer: Michael Angelakos; Benny Blanco; Cashmere Cat

Ryn Weaver chronology
Promises (2014)	The Fool (2015)

Singles from The Fool
- 1. "OctaHate" Released: August 8, 2014; 2. "Promises" Released: August 25, 2015

The Fool is the debut studio album by American singer and songwriter Ryn Weaver. It was released on June 16, 2015, by Mad Love and Interscope Records. The debut single, "OctaHate", was released on August 8, 2014. The album was made available to stream for free at the iTunes Store on June 9, 2015.

== Background and promotion ==
The Fool features production by Benny Blanco and Michael Angelakos, whom Weaver also worked with in the writing of the album. She also worked with British singer-songwriter Charlotte Aitchison, better known by her moniker Charli XCX on the album's first single, "OctaHate". Other contributors include Norwegian producer and musician Cashmere Cat, English musician Charlotte OC and OneRepublic frontman, Ryan Tedder.

Lyrically, The Fool explores topics of romantic relationships, family relationships, self-discovery and self-doubt. On the overlying theme of the album, Weaver stated the following:

The record poses the question: Is it foolish to settle for what you always thought you wanted as a 22-year-old woman, or is it foolish to go and leave what’s so beautiful, stable, and certain? I think that’s a question a lot of young women have these days, especially coming from a generation of girls who — in my opinion— have less of a road map. It’s not just about being a woman: It’s about being a modern human and about fear of commitment.

Weaver performed her song "Promises" from the album on the Tonight Show with Jimmy Fallon on June 19, 2015.

== Singles ==
"OctaHate" was released as the debut single on June 21, 2014, and impacted Top 40 radio on February 24, 2015. The song peaked at number 27 on the Billboard Pop Songs chart. The original music video for "OctaHate" was taken down, and replaced by a new one on May 14, 2015. During an interview with NY Mag, Weaver talked about why she took down the original. She claims the video wasn't executed properly and chose to create a new one because she "wanted people to understand [her] cohesive vision." The new music video for "OctaHate" was inspired by the 1966 film Daisies by director Věra Chytilová. Weaver explained, "For the second one, we ripped a page from this '60s Czech film called Daisies — this feminist, absurdist piece. In this scene, they talk about how the whole world is spoiled and how as a result, they should spoil themselves," — a theme which can be seen mirrored in the music video.

"Promises" was released on August 25, 2016, to Top 40 radio as the second single from the album.

=== Promotional singles ===
Although not announced as an official single, "The Fool" was made available on iTunes on April 10, 2015, shortly after the album was made available for pre-order. The song was premiered the previous day on BBC Radio 1. A music video for the song was released on May 7, 2015. Weaver stated that the music video was inspired by Studio Ghibli, the animation film studio which features many works by Japanese director Hayao Miyazaki. Also speaking on the video, she explained, "I wanted to touch on the shifting power dynamic within relationships in a surrealist, psychedelic medium... I've come to realize that my own empowerment has the tendency to result in emasculation and a new dependency that only heightens my fear of commitment."

== Critical reception ==
Professional ratings
Aggregate scores
Source	Rating
Metacritic	65/100
Review scores
Source	Rating
AllMusic	3.5/5 stars
Billboard	3.5/5 stars
The Guardian	4/5 stars
Pitchfork	4.9/10
PopMatters	7/10 stars
Rolling Stone	3/5 stars
Spin	7/10

Upon its release, The Fool received generally positive to mixed reviews from critics. At Metacritic, which assigns a normalized rating out of 100 to reviews from mainstream critics, The Fool received an average score of 65, based on 13 reviews. Writing for Consequence of Sound, Lyndsey Havens stated that the album "spins on like a series of diary entries", while comparing Weaver's vocals to those of Florence Welch and Imogen Heap. In a mixed review, Pitchfork's Miles Raymer claimed that the album had nothing close to "matching the intense pop rush" of her debut single "OctaHate".

On a positive note, Jon Parales of the New York Times highlighted the album's experimental tone, saying that Weaver channeled Stevie Nicks while also noting the track "Travelling Song" as the best track of the album, stating "It’s ardent, musically confident and openly careerist."

== Commercial performance ==
The Fool sold 13,800 units in its first week. It debuted and peaked at number 30 on the Billboard 200.

== Track listing ==
Standard edition
No.	Title	Writer(s)	Producer(s)	Length
1.	"Runaway"	Aryn Wüthrich; Michael Angelakos; Benjamin Levin; Jacob Troth	Benny Blanco; Angelakos	4:04
2.	"OctaHate"	Wüthrich; Charlotte Aitchison; Angelakos; Levin; Magnus Høiberg	Blanco; Angelakos; Cashmere Cat	3:24
3.	"Pierre"	Wüthrich; Angelakos; Levin; Ryan Tedder	Blanco; Angelakos; Tedder	3:22
4.	"Stay Low"	Wüthrich; Angelakos; Levin	Blanco; Angelakos	3:36
5.	"Sail On"	Wüthrich; Angelakos; Levin; Jennifer Decilveo	Blanco; Angelakos	3:49
6.	"The Fool"	Wüthrich; Angelakos; Levin	Blanco; Angelakos	3:49
7.	"Promises"	Wüthrich; Angelakos; Levin	Blanco; Angelakos	3:52
8.	"Free"	Wüthrich; Angelakos; Levin; Jennifer Decilveo; Giana Shabestari	Blanco; Angelakos; Decilveo	3:27
9.	"Traveling Song"	Wüthrich; Angelakos; Levin	Blanco; Angelakos	3:14
10.	"Here Is Home"	Wüthrich; Angelakos; Levin; Decilveo; Charlotte O'Connor	Blanco; Angelakos	4:20
11.	"New Constellations"	Wüthrich; Angelakos; Levin; Høiberg	Blanco; Angelakos; Cashmere Cat	4:38
Total length:				41:35

Target, Canadian and Australian bonus tracks
No.	Title	Producer(s)	Length
12.	"OctaHate" (Cashmere Cat Remix)	Cashmere Cat^{[a]}	4:21
13.	"Pierre" (Siren Sessions Version)		3:17

British deluxe edition
No.	Title	Length
14.	"The Fool" (Twoinchpunch remix)	2:33
15.	"Promises" (Live)	3:54
16.	"OctaHate" (Live)	3:41

== Personnel ==
Credits adapted from the liner notes of The Fool.

- Aryn Wüthrich – vocals
- Michael Angelakos – instrumentation, production, programming (all tracks); executive production
- Mike Bader – assistant engineer (tracks 1, 8, 10)
- Benny Blanco – instrumentation, production, programming (all tracks); executive production
- Nick Brown – drums (tracks 1, 8, 10)
- Cashmere Cat – instrumentation, production, programming (tracks 2, 11)
- Jennifer Decilveo – additional production (track 8)
- Matty Green – assistant engineer to mixer
- Seif "Mageef" Hussain – production coordination
- Andrew "McMuffin" Luftman – A&R, production coordination
- Phil Peterson – strings (track 8)
- Chris Sclafani – additional production (tracks 1, 8, 10); bass (track 8); mandolin (track 3); engineering
- Mark "Spike" Stent – mixing
- Geoff Swan – assistant engineer to mixer
- Eryck Bry – mixing

== Charts ==
Chart (2015)	Peak position
US Billboard 200	30
US Alternative Albums	7
US Digital Albums	8

== Release history ==
Region	Date	Format(s)	Label	Ref.
United States	June 16, 2015	CD; digital download	Interscope; Mad Love	
Australia	September 4, 2015	CD; digital download	Interscope; Mad Love	
New Zealand	September 4, 2015	CD; digital download	Interscope; Mad Love	
United Kingdom	September 4, 2015	CD; digital download	Interscope; Mad Love	
