= OctaHate =

Single by Ryn Weaver

from the album The Fool
- Released: August 8, 2014
- Recorded: 2014; Matzah Ball Studio (New York, NY); Mega House Studio (Venice, LA); Blackbird Studio (Nashville, TN)
- Genre: Indie pop; electropop
- Length: 3:26
- Label: Interscope; Friends Keep Secrets; Universal; Virgin EMI
- Songwriters: Aryn Wüthrich; Charlotte Aitchison; Michael Angelakos; Benjamin Levin; Magnus Høiberg
- Producers: Benny Blanco; Angelakos; Cashmere Cat

Ryn Weaver singles chronology
"OctaHate" (2014)	"The Fool" (2015)

"OctaHate" is the debut single by American singer-songwriter Ryn Weaver, taken from her debut EP, Promises (2014), as well as debut studio album, The Fool (2015). It was released by Interscope and Friends Keep Secrets Records on August 8, 2014. The song's lyrics, which do not contain the title, were written by Weaver and fellow singer Charli XCX, while production was handled by Benny Blanco, Michael Angelakos of Passion Pit and Cashmere Cat.

== Music video ==
The original music video for "OctaHate" was taken down, and replaced by a new one on May 14, 2015. During an interview with New York, Weaver talked about why she took down the original. She claims the video was made on a small budget and wasn't executed properly so she chose to create a new one because she "wanted people to understand [her] cohesive vision." The new music video for "OctaHate" was inspired by the 1966 film Daisies by director Věra Chytilová. Weaver explained, "For the second one, we ripped a page from this '60s Czech film called Daisies—this feminist, absurdist piece. In this scene, they talk about how the whole world is spoiled and how as a result, they should spoil themselves," a theme which can be seen mirrored in the music video.

== Live performances ==
Ryn made her live TV debut with a performance of "OctaHate" on the Late Show with David Letterman on January 15, 2015.

== Critical reception ==
Chris Deville from Stereogum praised the song saying, "Even at a time when it seems like every upstart on SoundCloud is pushing sparkly pan-genre synthpop, 'OctaHate' stood out for its sleek exterior and the effortless manner in which it swung from playful sway to magnificent sweep." The song was also given a positive review by Michelle Geslani of Consequence of Sound saying, "'OctaHate' is as catchy as a pop number can possibly hope to be. Between the twinkling xylophones, airtight melodies, and frothy beats, Weaver already sounds radio-ready, just in time for summer."

== Charts ==
Chart (2014–15)	Peak position
US Bubbling Under Hot 100 (Billboard)	3
US Pop Airplay (Billboard)	27
US Billboard Twitter Emerging Artists	1

== Certifications ==
Region	Certification	Certified units/sales
United States (RIAA)	Gold	500,000^{‡}
^{‡} Sales+streaming figures based on certification alone.
