= House (Charli XCX song) =

Single by Charli XCX featuring John Cale

from the album Wuthering Heights
- Released: 10 November 2025
- Genre: Spoken word; neoclassical darkwave; gothic rock; industrial rock
- Length: 3:18
- Label: Atlantic
- Songwriters: Charlotte Aitchison; John Cale; Finn Keane; Nathan Klein
- Producers: Finn Keane; Nathan Klein

Charli XCX singles chronology
"Everything Is Romantic" (2025)	"House" (2025)	"Chains of Love" (2025)

John Cale singles chronology
"Shark-Shark" (2024)	"House" (2025)

Music video
- "House" on YouTube

"House" is a song by British singer Charli XCX, featuring Welsh musician John Cale. It was released on 10 November 2025 through Atlantic Records as the lead single from her soundtrack album, Wuthering Heights (2026). The song marks a significant departure from the electronic sound of her previous album Brat (2024), incorporating gothic rock and industrial rock elements. It received a nomination in the category of Best Song Written for Visual Media at the 69th Annual Grammy Awards.

== Background and composition ==
Charli XCX began working on the soundtrack in December 2024 after director Emerald Fennell approached her to compose a song for her film adaptation of Emily Brontë's novel Wuthering Heights (1847). Inspired by Todd Haynes's 2021 documentary The Velvet Underground, Charli XCX was particularly struck by John Cale's description of the Velvet Underground's sound as needing to be both "elegant and brutal". "House" has been described as spoken word, neoclassical darkwave, gothic rock, and industrial rock.

After writing the initial version of "House" with producer Finn Keane while on the Brat Tour in Austin, Charli XCX reached out to Cale to collaborate. Cale recorded a spoken word poem for the track, which Charli XCX described as "something that only John could do... it made me cry." Cale would later appear on the cover art for Charli XCX's 2026 studio album Music, Fashion, Film, alongside Marc Jacobs and Martin Scorsese.

The song is noted for its "noisy and distorted instrumentation", drawing comparisons to Nine Inch Nails and featuring lush, gothic orchestral arrangements alongside industrial rock elements.

== Critical reception ==
"House" received acclaim from critics. Alexis Petridis of The Guardian called the song "powerful, striking and rewarding", noting it "bore almost no relation in sound or mood to the contents of Brat". Paolo Ragusa of Consequence described it as "goth rock", while several critics highlighted its "elegant and brutal" sonic palette.

== In popular culture ==
Following its release, "House" quickly became associated with a TikTok trend consisting of users sharing unsettling situations. The trend, though having no widely agreed name, is commonly searched for as "I think I'm gonna die in this house trend" due to that part of the song playing in the videos.

== Music video ==
An accompanying music video, directed by Mitch Ryan, was released alongside the single.

== Accolades ==
In 2026, the song was nominated for the World Soundtrack Awards in the Best Original Song category.

== Personnel ==
Credits adapted from official release.

- Charli XCX – vocals
- John Cale – featured vocals, spoken word
- Finn Keane – production
- Nathan Klein – production

== Charts ==
Weekly chart performance for "House"
Chart (2026)	Peak position
US Hot Rock & Alternative Songs (Billboard)	30

== Release history ==
Release dates and formats for "House"
Region	Date	Format(s)	Label	Ref.
Various	10 November 2025	Digital download; streaming	Atlantic	
