= You're the One (Charli XCX song) =

- UK release cover

Single by Charli XCX

from the EP You're the One and the album True Romance
- Released: 12 June 2012
- Recorded: 2011
- Genre: New wave; electropop; witch house
- Length: 3:15
- Label: Warner Music
- Songwriters: Charlotte Aitchison; Patrik Berger
- Producer: Patrik Berger

Charli XCX singles chronology
"I Love It" (2012)	"You're the One" (2012)	"Cloud Aura" (2012)

Music video
- "You're the One" on YouTube

"You're the One" is a song by British singer Charli XCX. It was released on 12 June 2012, under Warner Music, and the third single from her debut EP of the same name, and her debut studio album, True Romance (2013).

== Background ==
Charli XCX wrote the song while working in Sweden. Producer Patrik Berger sent her two beats, one of which became Icona Pop's "I Love It" and the other of which became "You're the One". Having just fallen in love, Charli XCX wrote the song to be "about super amazing orgasmic love". The song first appeared in 2011 under the title "In the Dark", in a demo form on the official promotional album sampler of True Romance. When performed for Gigwise in May 2012, it appeared under a second title "Dancing in the Dark". A CD single was released for promotional purposes in a cardboard sleeve.

== Critical reception ==
B. David Zarley from The Line of Best Fit praised the song, describing it as "goth pop combines pop song craft and approachability with a drenching layer of dark luxuriousness", and said it "shifts from clipped vocals and pallbearer shuffling verses to a lofting, romantic hook; the entire thing is a microcosm of the microgenre, vivisected and labelled and easily consumable." John Murphy from MusicOMH said the song "will threaten to take up residence in your brain for months on end", and described it as "an [excellent] real pop nugget". Billboard placed "You're the One" 16th on its list of the best songs of 2012, commenting that Charli XCX "released a string of dazzle pop singles this year, none quite as fluttering as this synth-laden love song."

== Music video ==
Charli XCX with her army of children in a warehouse scene.

The video for "You're the One" was uploaded to Charli XCX's official YouTube channel on July 3, 2012. It was directed by Dawn Shadforth. The video switches between three different scenes: Charli XCX and an army of children in a warehouse, featuring a large "XCX" on the wall; Charli XCX in a room featuring red light-up hearts and heart-shaped balloons; and Charli XCX performing on a small stage in front of a cloudy backdrop.

=== Odd Future's The Internet Remix video ===
Charli XCX in the style of a GIF. This picture showcases the visual effects used in the video.

A video was also made for the remix by The Internet (credited as Odd Future's The Internet) featuring Mike G, which appeared on the You're the One EP. It features short, brightly-colored clips of Charli XCX in the style of GIF images.

The video was directed by Claire Boyd and Ryan Andrews. Andrews has directed the music videos for several of Charli XCX's tracks, including "Cloud Aura" and "So Far Away". He explained that his work with Charli XCX uses a visual style that represents how she "developed herself through Twitter and Tumblr".

== Track listing ==
- CD single / Digital download
  - "You're the One" – 3:15

== Credits and personnel ==
- Lead vocals – Charli XCX
- Producer – Patrik Berger
- Sound Mixers – Rich Costley
- Lyrics – Charlotte Aitchison, Patrik Berger

== Charts ==
Chart (2012)	Peak position
US Hot Singles Sales (Billboard)	10
US Dance Singles Sales (Billboard)	5

== You're the One (EP) ==
You're the One (EP) is the first extended play by British singer Charli XCX. Three versions of the EP were released with varying track lists. The EP includes Charli XCX's two singles released exclusively in the UK in 2011; "Stay Away" and "Nuclear Seasons". Preceding the album's release in Australia, the title track was released digitally as the EP's lead single in that territory.

=== Track listing ===
US edition
No.	Title	Writer(s)	Producer(s)	Length
1.	"You're the One"	Charlotte Aitchison; Patrik Berger	Berger	3:17
2.	"You're the One" (Blood Orange remix)	Aitchison; Berger	Berger	4:15
3.	"Nuclear Seasons"	Aitchison; Justin Raisen; Ariel Rechtshaid	Rechtshaid	3:46
4.	"Nuclear Seasons" (Balam Acab remix)	Aitchison; Raisen; Rechtshaid	Rechtshaid	4:46
Total length:				16:04

UK edition
No.	Title	Writer(s)	Producer(s)	Length
1.	"You're the One"	Aitchison; Berger	Berger	3:16
2.	"So Far Away"	Aitchison; Paul White; Todd Rundgren	Rundgren; White	3:23
3.	"You're the One" (Odd Future's The Internet remix; featuring Mike G)	Aitchison; Berger; Mike Griffin	Berger	2:59
4.	"You're the One" (Blood Orange remix)	Aitchison; Berger	Berger	4:16
5.	"You're the One" (St. Lucia remix)	Aitchison; Berger	Berger	4:21
Total length:				18:15

Australian edition
No.	Title	Writer(s)	Producer(s)	Length
1.	"You're the One"	Aitchison; Berger	Berger	3:16
2.	"Stay Away"	Aitchison; Raisen; Rechtshaid	Rechtshaid	3:51
3.	"Nuclear Seasons"	Aitchison; Raisen; Rechtshaid	Rechtshaid	3:44
4.	"Nuclear Seasons" (Balam Acab remix)	Aitchison; Raisen; Rechtshaid	Rechtshaid	4:46
5.	"You're the One" (Blood Orange remix)	Aitchison; Berger	Berger	4:16
6.	"You're the One" (Odd Future's The Internet remix; featuring Mike G)	Aitchison; Berger; Griffin	Berger	2:59
Total length:				22:52

== Release history ==
Region	Date	Label	Format
United States	12 June 2012	IAMSOUND Records	Digital download
United Kingdom	14 September 2012	Asylum Records; Atlantic Records	Digital download
Australia	21 September 2012	Warner Music	Digital download
Australia	28 September 2012	Warner Music	CD
