= True Romance (Charli XCX album) =

Studio album by Charli XCX
- Released: 12 April 2013
- Recorded: 2010–2012
- Genres: Pop; synth-pop; dark wave; goth pop
- Length: 47:02
- Labels: Asylum; Atlantic
- Producers: Joakim Åhlund; Patrik Berger; Blood Diamonds; J£zus Million; Ariel Rechtshaid; Dimitri Tikovoi; Paul White

Charli XCX chronology
| Super Ultra (2012) | True Romance (2013) | Sucker (2014) |

Singles from True Romance
- 1. "Stay Away" Released: 15 May 2011; 2. "Nuclear Seasons" Released: 20 November 2011; 3. "You're the One" Released: 12 June 2012; 4. "You (Ha Ha Ha)" Released: 8 February 2013; 5. "What I Like" Released: 3 April 2013

True Romance is the debut studio album by British singer Charli XCX, released on 12 April 2013 by Asylum and Atlantic Records. Originally scheduled for release to would be on 12 April 2012, the album's release was delayed for exactly 1 year and had been in the making since 2010 when Charli XCX met with producer Ariel Rechtshaid in Los Angeles. To promote the album's release, Charli XCX embarked on a tour throughout the United Kingdom in April 2013.

== Background and recording ==
In 2010, Charli XCX was signed to Asylum Records. She then flew out to Los Angeles to meet producers, and found it "wasn't working out" for her until she met with American producer Ariel Rechtshaid. They had a two-hour session and wrote the song "Stay Away". She also began working with Swedish producer Patrik Berger; he sent her two beats, and she quickly wrote songs for each, one of which became "I Love It" and the other of which became "You're the One". She stated that she did not end up releasing "I Love It" herself as she could not reconcile it with her sound but, in 2012, Swedish duo Icona Pop re-recorded the song and released it as a single featuring her vocals. The song became an international hit, hitting number 1 in Charli XCX's home country and climbing to number seven on the Billboard Hot 100 in 2013.

The title of True Romance was named after Tony Scott's 1993 film of the same name, written by Quentin Tarantino. Charli XCX explained the meaning behind of it, saying: "Every corner of my own romantic history is explored on this record, so for me, it's very raw, it's very honest, and it's very true." The majority of True Romance's tracks were previously released on her extended play (EP) titled You're the One, as well as through the Heartbreaks and Earthquakes and Super Ultra mixtapes.

== Composition ==
True Romance is a pop, synth-pop, dark wave, and goth pop album.

"You're the One" has been compared to Siouxsie and the Banshees's 1991 song "Kiss Them for Me" and Charli agreed: "At the time, I was listening to a lot of dark pop, so I was inspired by a lot of the deep bass sounds. Sure, Siouxsie is there, too. We just kind of rolled with it." Charli XCX said for Coupdemain magazine that her preferred song of the album is "What I Like": "just because all the lyrics are cute". She also stated that "What I Like" is "about me unashamedly celebrating having a boyfriend and being in love. It's about being so happy with someone, like they're your partner in crime. It's about not caring about anything else but them."

== Release and promotion ==
True Romance was released on 12 April 2013, to digital and in CD format by Asylum and Atlantic Records. (Note: In other territories, the album was released by different recording labels: Warner Music Group in Netherland, Canada, Australia, Germany, and Brazil; Iamsound in the United States.) The LP edition was released on 13 August.

In May and November 2011, Charli XCX released the singles, "Stay Away" and "Nuclear Seasons". She gained attention from the music website Pitchfork where she earned "Best New Track" accolades for both. "You're the One" was issued as the album's third single on 12 June 2012, through Iamsound Records. Its music video was directed by Dawn Shadforth and the EP of the same name followed in July. She released its remixed versions by Mike G from Odd Future and Deadboy in August, and performed the track at Bestival 2012 in September. That month, a music video directed by Ryan Andrews for "So Far Away" was unveiled.

Through BBC Radio 1, Charli XCX premiered the song "You (Ha Ha Ha)" in December. Its music video was premiered in January 2013. Charli XCX released the song on 4 February, making it the album's fourth single. On 3 April, True Romance's fifth single titled "What I Like" was released alongside an Andrews-directed music video. The standard edition of the album became available to stream via Pitchfork in full six days later. She also held a three-day UK tour in support of the album, which began at Old Blue Last on 17 April. Same day, "What I Like"'s remix version featuring Danny Brown was unveiled.

== Critical reception ==
Professional ratings
Aggregate scores
| Source | Rating |
|---|---|
| AnyDecentMusic? | 7.1/10 |
| Metacritic | 76/100 |
Review scores
| Source | Rating |
| AllMusic | 4/5 stars |
| Fact | 3.5/5 stars |
| The Guardian | 4/5 stars |
| MusicOMH | 3/5 stars |
| NME | 6/10 |
| Pitchfork | 8.3/10 |
| PopMatters | 7/10 |
| Rolling Stone | 3.5/5 stars |
| Slant Magazine | 2.5/5 stars |
| Spin | 7/10 |

True Romance received generally positive reviews from music critics. On Metacritic, which assigns a normalised rating out of 100 to reviews from mainstream publications, the album received an average score of 76, based on 18 reviews.

Pitchfork's Marc Hogan wrote that Charli XCX "pull[s] from moody 80s synth-pop, sassy turn-of-the-millennium girl groups, and state-of-the-art contemporary producers to create something distinctive and immediately memorable", concluding that she "stamps her personality across the entire project, and True Romance suggests she'll be worth following for a while." Rebecca Nicholson of The Guardian found the album to be "surprisingly oddball and packed with production quirks that often resemble a smoothed-off Grimes", adding that "while there's still the odd remnant of Marina-lite pop, this sounds like an imminent star steadily staking a claim to her own turf."

Heather Phares of AllMusic noted that Charli XCX "has a flair for combining a wide array of pop culture sources into something fresh and familiar, as well as a fondness for strong female characters." Phares continued, "Since quite a few of these songs were already road-tested, it's not surprising that this is a strong debut, but just how consistently catchy and personal True Romance is might raise a few eyebrows." Spin's Puja Patel viewed True Romance as "a strident departure from those frivolities so far as solid, true-to-aim songwriting is concerned, but the divergence and a touch of the silliness remains: Goth, she is not. Dramatic? A bit. Complicated? Like every budding pop starlet. Defiant? Absolutely." Despite stating that the album "is confusing at times and will most definitely require multiple listens", Enio Chiola of PopMatters opined that Charli XCX is "the fun pop you don't have to be embarrassed about listening to, and she's definitely worth focusing your attention. True Romance is certainly the true beginning of an illustrious career." Lauren Martin of Fact commented, "Love, lust and longing are chronicled and dissected in True Romance through online relationships being gradually given tangible, tactile form, setting Charli up as a young pop star to be reckoned with." Rolling Stone critic Will Hermes described True Romance as "the pop-album equivalent of a wicked Tumblr".

In a mixed review, Nick Levine of NME felt that although the album "begins strongly" with "Nuclear Seasons" and "You (Ha Ha Ha)", the songs eventually "become samey and Charli [...] shoves some kind of speak-rap into almost every track", concluding, "At the moment, her music is best consumed in blog-sized chunks, not as a stodgy 48-minute album." Similarly, John Murphy of MusicOMH expressed that "[t]here's much to enjoy on True Romance, although it's probably best sampled in small doses as it doesn't hang together that successfully over the course of an album." Paula Mejia of Consequence of Sound dismissed the album as "a valiant attempt that doesn't do much more than provide the soundtrack for 'getting ready to go out' songs on tinny laptop speakers." Slant Magazine's Kevin Liedel criticised the album as "a little too slickly produced and self-aware to deliver the kind of spontaneous creativity or carefree chic that Charli XCX aims for", while dubbing its music "almost incidental, a postscript to the larger brand, confirming that whoever 'Charli XCX' actually is, she's more product than artist."

== Commercial performance ==
True Romance debuted at number 85 on the UK Albums Chart, selling 1,241 copies in its first week. By February 2015, the album had sold 6,302 copies in the United Kingdom. In the United States, it entered the Heatseekers Albums chart at number five, and fell to number 22 the following week. The album had sold 12,000 copies in the US as of May 2014. True Romance debuted and peaked at number 11 on the ARIA Hitseekers chart in Australia.

== Track listing ==
Standard edition
| No. | Title | Writer(s) | Producer(s) | Length |
|---|---|---|---|---|
| 1. | "Nuclear Seasons" | Charlotte Aitchison; Ariel Rechtshaid; Justin Raisen | Rechtshaid | 4:38 |
| 2. | "You (Ha Ha Ha)" | Aitchison; Jocke Åhlund; Gold Panda | Åhlund; Mark "Spike" Stent^{[a]} | 3:08 |
| 3. | "Take My Hand" | Aitchison; Rechtshaid; Raisen | Rechtshaid | 4:26 |
| 4. | "Stay Away" | Aitchison; Rechtshaid | Rechtshaid | 3:48 |
| 5. | "Set Me Free (Feel My Pain)" | Aitchison; Rechtshaid; Dimitri Tikovoi | Tikovoi; Rechtshaid | 3:53 |
| 6. | "Grins" | Aitchison; Michael Tucker | Blood Diamonds; Dan Aslet^{[a]} | 3:53 |
| 7. | "So Far Away" | Aitchison; Todd Rundgren; Paul White | White; Aslet^{[a]} | 3:21 |
| 8. | "Cloud Aura" (featuring Brooke Candy) | Aitchison; Joseph Zucco; Candy | J£zus Million; Aslet^{[a]} | 2:44 |
| 9. | "What I Like" | Aitchison; Zucco | J£zus Million; Aslet^{[a]} | 3:02 |
| 10. | "Black Roses" | Aitchison; Rechtshaid; Raisen | Rechtshaid | 3:28 |
| 11. | "You're the One" | Aitchison; Patrik Berger | Berger; Rechtshaid^{[b]} | 3:15 |
| 12. | "How Can I" | Aitchison; Rechtshaid; Raisen | Rechtshaid | 3:55 |
| 13. | "Lock You Up" | Aitchison; Rechtshaid | Rechtshaid | 3:31 |
| Total length: | | | | 47:02 |

Digital deluxe edition
| No. | Title | Length |
|---|---|---|
| 14. | "You (Ha Ha Ha)" (Burns' Violet Cloud version) | 5:04 |
| 15. | "You're the One" (Odd Future's The Internet remix; featuring Mike G) | 2:59 |
| 16. | "You (Ha Ha Ha)" (Goldroom remix) | 6:45 |
| 17. | "Stay Away" (T. Williams remix) | 5:18 |
| 18. | "You're the One" (Blood Orange remix) | 4:16 |
| 19. | "You (Ha Ha Ha)" (MS MR remix) | 3:46 |
| 20. | "Nuclear Seasons" (Balam Acab remix) | 4:46 |
| 21. | "You're the One" (Climbers remix) | 3:20 |
| 22. | "Stay Away" (Salem's Angel remix) | 5:01 |
| 23. | "Nuclear Seasons" (Hackman remix) | 4:34 |
| 24. | "You're the One" (Loadstar remix) | 5:03 |
| 25. | "You're the One" (St. Lucia remix) | 4:21 |
| 26. | "You (Ha Ha Ha)" (Lindstrøm remix; pre-order only) | 7:21 |
| 27. | "Nuclear Seasons" (Night Plane remix; pre-order only) | 4:44 |
| 28. | "You (Ha Ha Ha)" (Melé remix; pre-order only) | 3:59 |
| 29. | "You're the One" (Deadboy remix; pre-order only) | 5:12 |
| Total length: | | 2:06:31 |

Notes

- ^{^a} signifies a vocal producer.
- ^{^b} signifies an additional producer.
- On the digital edition and vinyl repress of the album, "Set Me Free" is titled "Set Me Free (Feel My Pain)".
- "You (Ha Ha Ha)" samples "You" by Gold Panda.
- "So Far Away" samples "A Dream Goes On Forever" and "An Elpee's Worth of Toons" by Todd Rundgren.

== Personnel ==
Credits were adapted from the liner notes.

=== Musicians ===
- Charli XCX – vocals
- Tom Boddy – additional programming (track 2); album remixes
- Andrew Wilkinson – additional programming (tracks 2, 6)
- Dimitri Tikovoi – programming (track 5)
- Louise Burns – additional vocals (track 6)
- Brooke Candy – vocals (track 8)
- Hal Ritson – additional keyboards, programming (track 9)
- Richard Adlam – additional keyboards, programming (track 9)
- Miriam Stockley – additional backing vocals (track 9)

=== Production and design ===
- Ariel Rechtshaid – production (tracks 1, 3–5, 10, 12, 13); additional production (track 11)
- Rich Costey – mixing (tracks 1, 4, 11)
- Chris Kasych – mixing assistance, Pro Tools engineering (tracks 1, 4, 11)
- Jocke Åhlund – production (track 2)
- Mark "Spike" Stent – vocal production (track 2); mixing (tracks 2, 3, 5)
- Matty Green – mixing assistance (tracks 2, 3, 5)
- David Emery – mixing assistance (track 3)
- Dimitri Tikovoi – production (track 5)
- Blood Diamonds – production (track 6)
- Dan Aslet – vocal production (tracks 6–9); mixing (track 8)
- Neil Comber – mixing (tracks 6, 7, 9, 10, 12)
- Paul White – production (track 7)
- J£zus Million – production (tracks 8, 9); mixing (track 8)
- Patrik Berger – production (track 11)
- Dave Bascombe – mixing (track 13)
- Stuart Hawkes – mastering
- Jeremy Cooper – editing
- Andy Hayes – design
- Dan Curwin – photography

== Charts ==
2013 weekly chart performance
| Chart (2013) | Peak position |
|---|---|
| Australian Hitseekers Albums (ARIA) | 11 |
| UK Albums (Official Charts) | 85 |
| US Heatseekers Albums (Billboard) | 5 |

2023 weekly chart performance
| Chart (2023) | Peak position |
|---|---|
| Australian Vinyl Albums (ARIA) | 17 |
| Hungarian Albums (MAHASZ) | 15 |
| Scottish Albums (Official Charts) | 7 |
| US Top Album Sales (Billboard) | 36 |

== Release history ==
Release history and formats
| Region | Date | Format | Label | Ref. |
|---|---|---|---|---|
| Ireland | 12 April 2013 | CD; digital download | Asylum; Atlantic | |
| Various | 13 August 2013 | LP | Iamsound | |
