= Nuclear Seasons =

Single by Charli XCX

from the album True Romance and the EP You're the One
- Released: 20 November 2011
- Recorded: 2011
- Genre: Dark wave; synth-pop; electropop; lo-fi
- Length: 4:42 (album version); 3:42 (single version)
- Label: This Is Music; Atlantic UK; Warner UK
- Songwriters: Charlotte Aitchison; Justin Raisen; Ariel Rechtshaid
- Producer: Rechtshaid

Charli XCX singles chronology
"Stay Away" (2011)	"Nuclear Seasons" (2011)	"I Love It" (2012)

Music video
- "Nuclear Seasons" on YouTube

"Nuclear Seasons" is a song by British singer Charli XCX taken from her debut extended play (EP), You're the One (2012), and was later included on her debut studio album, True Romance (2013). It was released as the EP's second single on 21 October 2011 through This Is Music, Atlantic, and Warner Music UK. "Nuclear Seasons" was written by Charli XCX, Justin Raisen, and Ariel Rechtshaid, while the latter produced the song.

== Composition ==
Musically, "Nuclear Seasons" is a slow-burning dark wave, synth-pop, electropop and lo-fi song with low-lying synths, industrial textures, and a shadowy atmosphere. The album version of the song contains a minute-long intro (a sample of "Grins", another song appearing on True Romance) where Charli XCX repeats the refrain “No one lives forever.” According to Peter Tabakis of Pretty Much Amazing, the song "forms the sonic and thematic outline for each song to come." The song's 80's-influenced vocal melody has been described as the centerpiece of its "lavish, if busy, production", which features flourishes of synths rings, electronic buzzes, and pattering and crashing beats. Lyrically, "Nuclear Seasons" compares taking shelter from the "literal and figurative fallout of a breakup" to surviving a nuclear fallout. Its lyrics speak of things such as burning cars and falling through the clouds, which according to Art Ivan of Tiny Mix Tapes, depicts what a rapture would look and sound like. In an interview with Rolling Stone, Charli XCX stated the song "reflects a state of cultural decay." Charli XCX specifically notes what she sees as a decay in youth culture, stating "I don't feel like there's anything for people to really grab onto these days. There's no movement to speak of." While reviewing True Romance, Kevin Liedel of Slant Magazine called the song a "K-pop-esque opus" which showed one of only a few moments of genuine spontaneity.

== Critical reception ==
Joe Rivers of No Ripcord gave the song a positive review, saying: "It makes you wonder why Charli XCX isn't all over commercial radio; it's a catchy, well-constructed pop song that manages to pack a lot in without conforming to the Guetta/Harris dance-pop template, instead injecting an effortless, swaggering cool."

== Music video and usage in media ==
The video for "Nuclear Seasons" was uploaded to her channel on YouTube on 22 November 2011. The video has a witch house vibe, and was directed by Ryan Evans, with effects by Crim3s. "Nuclear Seasons" was Charli XCX's first official video, not including the Salem remix video for "Stay Away". The song is featured on a sneak peek for the Swim 2013 collection for Victoria's Secret and was featured on the season six episode "High Infidelity", of Gossip Girl. The song is featured in the opening credits for the film Two Night Stand (2014), starring Miles Teller and Analeigh Tipton.The single cover is shown as a poster in a scene of season six from British series Skins.

== Track listing ==
- CD single
1. "Nuclear Seasons" — 3:44
- Digital EP
1. "Nuclear Seasons" — 3:44
2. "Nuclear Seasons" (Hackman Remix) — 4:35
3. "Nuclear Seasons" (Night Plane Remix) — 4:45
4. "Nuclear Seasons" (Night Plane Extended Remix) — 7:01

== Personnel ==
- Charli XCX – vocals
- Ariel Rechtshaid – production, mixing
- Howle Weinberg – mastering
