= Bertie Brandes =

British screenwriter and culture writer

- Born: January 5, 1990 (age 36)
- Education: Queen Mary University
- Occupations: Screenwriter, writer

Bertie Brandes (born 5 January 1990) is a British writer and screenwriter. She wrote the screenplay for the A24 film The Moment (2026) with Aidan Zamiri. Brandes is also known for founding the satirical feminist magazine Mushpit and for her journalism in publications such as VICE, GQ, The Times, The Telegraph and The Guardian.

Brandes's work has been described as "challeng[ing] the unrealistic representation of women in the media" by i-D magazine and "an experimental and satirical approach to magazine-making" by AnOther magazine, with It's Nice That describing her as "leading London’s independent print army".

== Career ==
=== Film ===
Brandes was revealed in January 2025 as a writer of the screenplay for The Moment, a mockumentary following a pop star preparing for her first arena tour. The film is directed by Aidan Zamiri and stars Charli XCX, Alexander Skarsgård, Rosanna Arquette, Isaac Cole Powell, Kate Berlant, Rish Shah, and Jamie Demetriou. The film is produced by A24 and Studio365, and began filming in London in March 2025.

=== Journalism ===
Brandes began her writing career as UK fashion editor for VICE and has written on fashion, feminism, and culture for publications such as VICE, GQ, The Times, The Fence, The Telegraph, The Face and The Guardian.

In 2011, Brandes founded the satirical feminist magazine Mushpit with Charlotte Roberts. Initially conceived as a zine, it evolved into a biannual magazine known for parodying glossy women's publications while engaging with political and social issues. Mushpit's influence on the emergence of the UK zine movement was recognised in 2018 with a D&AD Pencil award. The magazine was also featured in the Somerset House exhibition Print! Tearing It Up, which celebrated the resurgence of British independent publishing.

Mushpit creative director Richard Turley later founded Civilization and Nuts, with Brandes contributing to both. In an interview with Interview Magazine, Turley described working with Brandes as "always a journey".

== Notable works ==
- The Moment (2025) – Co‑screenwriter
- Mushpit (2011–2018) – Co‑founder and editor
- Body Moves, Shadow Moves (2024) – Zine
- “Robin Thicke’s New Video Is Horrible, Misogynist Bullshit” (2013) – Critique of the “Blurred Lines” video published in VICE
