= Brat Summer =

2024 cultural phenomenon

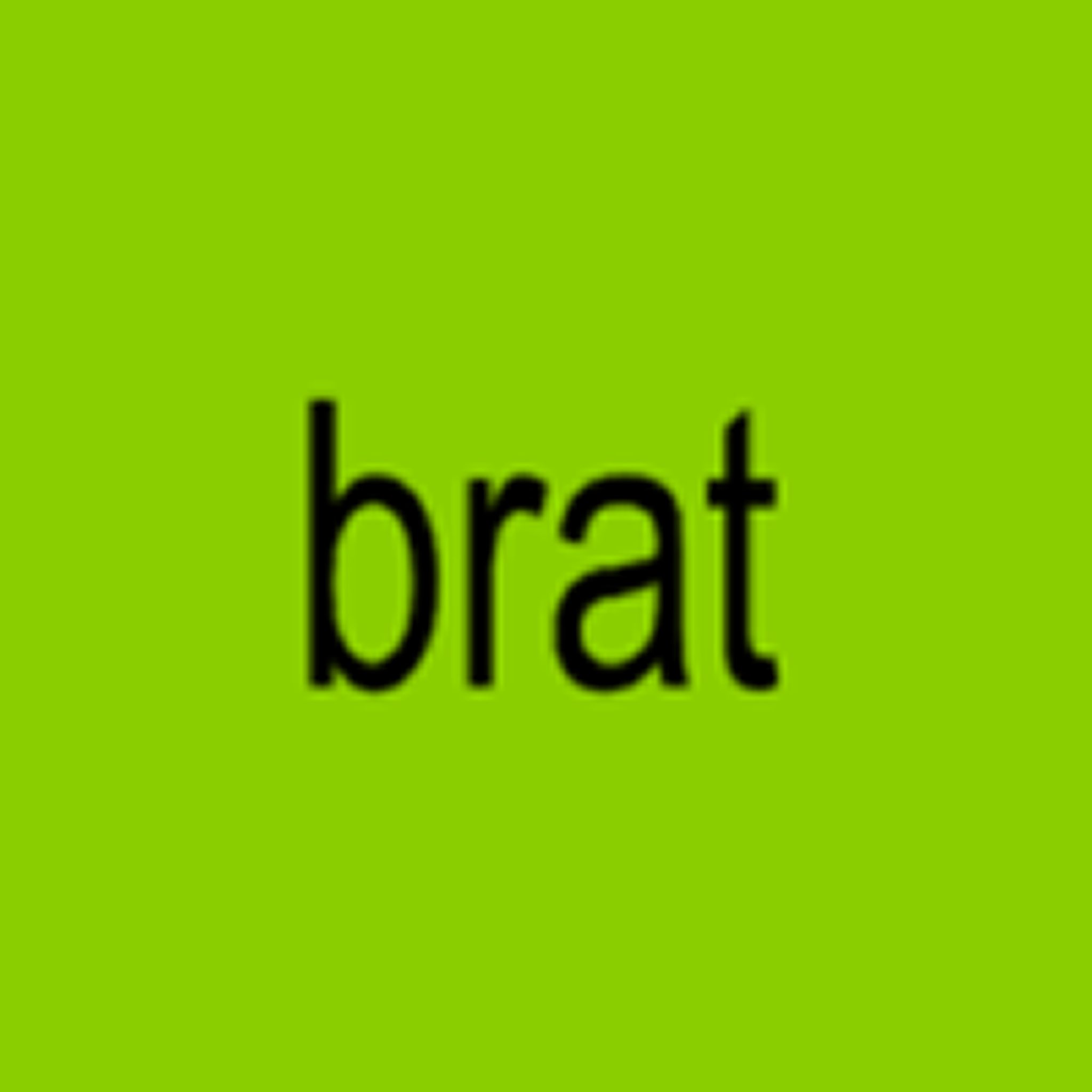
Cover art for Brat

The British singer Charli XCX's sixth studio album, Brat, sparked a cultural phenomenon dubbed Brat Summer following its release on June 7, 2024.

== Background and origin ==
=== Promotion of Brat ===
Much of Brat's virality was due to its heavy promotion. In the weeks leading up to the album's release, a wall in Greenpoint, Brooklyn, (called the "brat wall" by fans) was painted and repainted with the album's signature green color and various messages. Over the summer, its messages changed frequently in line with the album's promotional cycle, such as the lyrics from the song "360" (2024) or the name of its accompanying remix album.

After the album's cover art started to gain traction online, Charli XCX and Atlantic Records created a website called "Brat Generator", allowing users to make images with custom text in the same style as the cover. As noted by Hofstra Chronicle, the website's simple user interface helped parodies of the cover go viral. Brandon Davis, head of A&R at Atlantic Records, also believed that the website helped expand the album's "cultural cachet".

=== Aesthetics ===
Charli XCX has stated that while the aesthetics associated with Brat Summer can be "quite luxury", she mainly characterized it as "trashy": "Just, like, a pack of cigs, and, like, a Bic lighter, and, like, a strappy white top. With no bra. That's, like, kind of all you need." CNN Style's Leah Dolan opined that the movement was "about messy, imperfect self-acceptance" at its core.

== Usage in politics ==
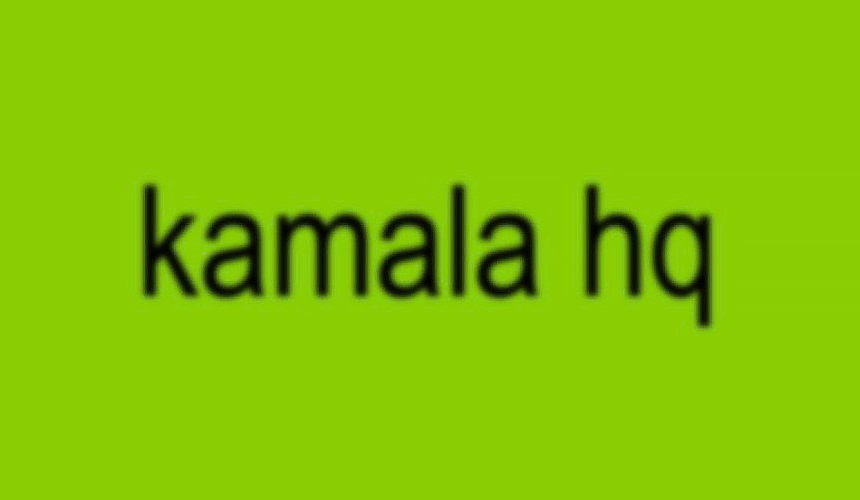
Banner picture of Kamala HQ

After then-US president Joe Biden announced he would not seek re-election in 2024 and endorsed Kamala Harris as the Democratic nominee, Charli XCX tweeted "kamala IS brat" on Twitter. Shortly after, the official Biden–Harris campaign account rebranded itself as "Kamala HQ", updating its banner to mimic the Brat album cover. While Charli XCX clarified that her tweet was not a formal endorsement, she added that she was "happy to help prevent democracy from failing forever."

"Brat" edits of Harris went viral on TikTok and Instagram, with users pairing clips of remarks such as "I love Venn diagrams" and "you think you just fell out of a coconut tree?" with Charli XCX's music. Ryan Long, who helped popularize the meme format, felt that Harris "does such a good job at embodying what people call 'Brat summer.' The way she presents herself, she's happy, laughing, she'll dance. She is like a walking content farm."

BBC felt that the campaign's adoption of the movement helped Harris appeal to younger voting demographics, "who now, thanks in part to Charli XCX, see her as the 'cool girl' option."

== Reception and legacy ==
Lucy Hancock of Elle praised the movement as "the perfect piece of feminist punk commentary. It trolled and mocked the mainstream media by challenging conventional ideas of what is culturally 'important.' This weird lurid green moment in culture has catapulted us all into the embrace of chaos."

In November 2024, Collins Dictionary named "brat" the 2024 Word of the Year, defining the term as "a confident, independent, and hedonistic attitude". A blog post by the dictionary called it a "fitting" term for the year, where "hedonism and anxiety have combined to form an intoxicating brew."

Despite Charli XCX declaring that Brat Summer was "over" in September 2024, it experienced a resurgence after the 2025 Coachella Valley Music and Arts Festival, where Charli XCX performed alongside guest appearances by Troye Sivan, Lorde, Billie Eilish, and Addison Rae. The show's setlist featured multiple tracks from Brat, as well as onstage text reading "Please don't let it be over" in all capitals, seemingly re-embracing the phenomenon.

In 2026, Charli XCX produced and starred in the mockumentary film The Moment, which satirized Brat Summer. Her character, a fictionalized version of herself, confesses to feeling burdened by the phenomenon, describes Brat Summer as "cringe", and states she wishes to destroy Brat and "let it die".
