= The Moment (2026 film) =

2026 mockumentary film

- Theatrical release poster
- Directed by: Aidan Zamiri
- Written by: Aidan Zamiri; Bertie Brandes
- Story by: Charli XCX
- Produced by: Charli XCX; David Hinojosa
- Starring: Charli XCX; Rosanna Arquette; Kate Berlant; Jamie Demetriou; Hailey Benton Gates; Isaac Powell; Alexander Skarsgård
- Cinematography: Sean Price Williams
- Edited by: Bill Sneddon; Neal Farmer
- Music by: A. G. Cook
- Production companies: 2AM; Studio365; Good World
- Distributed by: A24 (United States); Universal Pictures (United Kingdom)
- Release dates: January 23, 2026 (Sundance); January 30, 2026 (United States); February 20, 2026 (United Kingdom)
- Running time: 103 minutes
- Countries: United Kingdom; United States
- Language: English
- Budget: $4 million
- Box office: $5.2 million

The Moment is a 2026 mockumentary film directed by Aidan Zamiri, who co-wrote it with Bertie Brandes from an original idea by Charli XCX. The film stars Charli XCX, Rosanna Arquette, Kate Berlant, Jamie Demetriou, Hailey Benton Gates, Isaac Powell, and Alexander Skarsgård.

The Moment premiered at the 2026 Sundance Film Festival on January 23, 2026, and was released in the United States by A24 on January 30. The film received mixed reviews from critics.

== Plot ==
In September 2024, at the tail end of the Brat Summer phenomenon and the apex of her fame, British pop artist Charli XCX prepares to begin rehearsals for her arena tour debut while still regularly promoting the Brat album. Despite the fact that she and her team find it "cringe", she is forced to continue the album cycle by her label, Atlantic Records, who have a vested interest in maintaining Brat's cultural relevance by forging several brand deals. One of these is a Brat credit card under Howard Stirling, a failing bank company, which grants fans a free ticket to the tour upon signup. Before a launch event for the credit card, Charli expresses her disdain for the deal and refuses to promote it on social media.

Tammy Pitman, an Atlantic executive, is convinced to license the production of an Amazon Music concert film documenting the Brat Tour, directed by Johannes Godwin, a pretentious filmmaker whose work Charli finds objectifying of women. He insists upon watching rehearsals, much to the dismay of Charli and her close friend and creative director, Celeste. Johannes takes over creative control, aiming to sanitize the original concept of the tour into something more family-oriented, butting heads with Celeste who tries to keep intact the original vision she and Charli had worked on. Spread thin by the continued promotion of Brat, rehearsals for the tour, and Johannes's disrespect, Charli takes a sudden vacation to Ibiza which her assistant previously booked without her permission.

Tensions between Celeste and Johannes continue to rise, the latter convincing Tammy to give him further creative control under the guise of Celeste being difficult to work with. In Ibiza, Charli attends an appointment for a holistic facial from Maria, a cold woman who insults her and says she should stop everything to have a child, before arbitrarily deciding Charli is too combative to continue. Later, Charli happens upon media personality Kylie Jenner and confesses that many have been telling her to "slow down". Kylie gravely advises her that when people are growing sick of her, she should "go even harder". With two weeks left until the first tour date, an emboldened Charli argues with her managers over the phone, rashly deciding to post about the Howard Stirling deal as to quickly fund Johannes's expensive vision and smooth out the production.

The next day, an exhausted Celeste watches as Johannes completely revamps the entire visual presentation of the tour. Charli returns from vacation and is displeased with Johannes's direction, but forced to continue as her own money is being used for it. His vision features several spectacular set pieces, including a giant lighter and cigarette, trite monologues, flashy costumes and makeup, and suspending Charli in midair with a harness. As Charli begins to have severe doubts about the tour's quality, Celeste is fired after voicing concerns about Charli's mental health. Mid-rehearsal, Tammy, along with Atlantic's legal team, rush in to confront Charli and her team, informing them that not only did Charli's post falsely advertise the benefits of the credit card, many of her fans committed fraud for those benefits, effectively both voiding the deal and bankrupting Howard Stirling. Facing severe backlash on social media, Charli disappears.

Six days later, while in a meeting with Atlantic, Charli's managers and assistant realize she hasn't been seen or heard from since the Howard Stirling controversy. Fearing that she may be dead, they rush to her London home and are relieved to find she had simply taken another break. Once again returning to rehearsal, Charli records a lengthy voice message apologizing to Celeste, admitting that she has grown tired of Brat following its extreme popularity despite her desire to be widely liked by others. She says that despite the tour being completely mutated from its original vision, she has decided to perform anyway as its poor quality will force the album cycle to be over. The film ends with a trailer for Johannes's bastardized Brat Live! concert film.

== Cast ==
- Charli XCX as a fictionalized version of herself
- Rosanna Arquette as Tammy Pitman
- Kate Berlant as Molly Jean Bush
- Jamie Demetriou as Tim Potts
- Hailey Benton Gates as Celeste Moreau Collins
- Isaac Powell as Lloyd Randall
- Alexander Skarsgård as Johannes Godwin
- Rish Shah as Jamie Singh
- Trew Mullen as Ana De Courcey
- Kylie Jenner as a fictionalized version of herself
- Rachel Sennott as a fictionalized version of herself
- Arielle Dombasle as Maria
- Mel Ottenberg as a fictionalized version of himself
- Richard Perez as Morgh Gutierrez
- Tish Weinstock as Josette
- Michael Workéyè as Josh Campbell
- Julia Fox as a fictionalized version of herself
- Shygirl as a fictionalized version of herself
- A. G. Cook as a fictionalized version of himself
- Anthony Fantano as a fictionalized version of himself

== Production ==
=== Development ===
In September 2024, during her Sweat concert tour, British singer Charli XCX sent her collaborator Aidan Zamiri a message, which he later dubbed "word vomit" and said about it: "It almost felt like a diary entry of, 'This is how I feel right now.' This feeling of having just almost got everything she could have wanted, and what that felt like on kind of a human level." The message served as the basis for The Moment. Zamiri and Bertie Brandes finished the screenplay in a few months with input from the singer. In January 2025, it was announced Charli XCX had joined the cast of the film, with Zamiri directing from the screenplay he wrote alongside Brandes. Charli XCX and David Hinojosa will produce the film under their Studio365 and 2AM banners, respectively, while A24 will distribute.

Charli XCX described the film as "a 2024 period piece". She stated that the film was "not a tour documentary or a concert film in any way", but that the idea was formed from "being pressured to make one." In addition, she noted that while the film was a work of fiction, the film was "the realest depiction of the music industry that [she had] ever seen." She previously told Anna Peele of Vanity Fair that a tour documentary was one project that she had turned down during this period, feeling that the market was already saturated with similar projects. Describing its plot, Zamiri stated that the film explores what would have happened if the singer had made "entirely different choices" around her sixth studio album Brat (2024).

=== Casting ===
In March 2025, Alexander Skarsgård, Trew Mullen, Rosanna Arquette, Isaac Cole Powell, Kate Berlant, Rish Shah and Jamie Demetriou joined the cast of the film. In October 2025, it was reported that Kylie Jenner, Rachel Sennott, Arielle Dombasle, Hailey Benton Gates, Mel Ottenberg, Richard Perez, Tish Weinstock, Michael Workéyè, Shygirl, and the score composer A. G. Cook were also part of the cast. Regarding her role in the film, Charli XCX described it as "sort of a hell version of myself." Skarsgård was revealed to be playing "one of the villains or antagonists of the film."

=== Filming ===
Principal photography began in March 2025, in London. Jenner was later photographed on set on April 14.

=== Music ===
A. G. Cook, Charli XCX's friend and frequent collaborator, composed the score for the film. He released "Dread" on December 12, 2025, as the first single from the soundtrack. The song heavily samples Charli XCX's 2012 single "I Love It". The second single, "Offscreen", was released on January 15, 2026. The third single, "Residue" was released on January 27, 2026. It was accompanied by a music video, released the same day, starring Charli XCX, Jenner and "legions of [Charli's] clones". The full soundtrack was released on January 30, 2026 via A24 Music. In addition to Cook's score, "Bitter Sweet Symphony" by the Verve plays during the final scene.

== Release ==
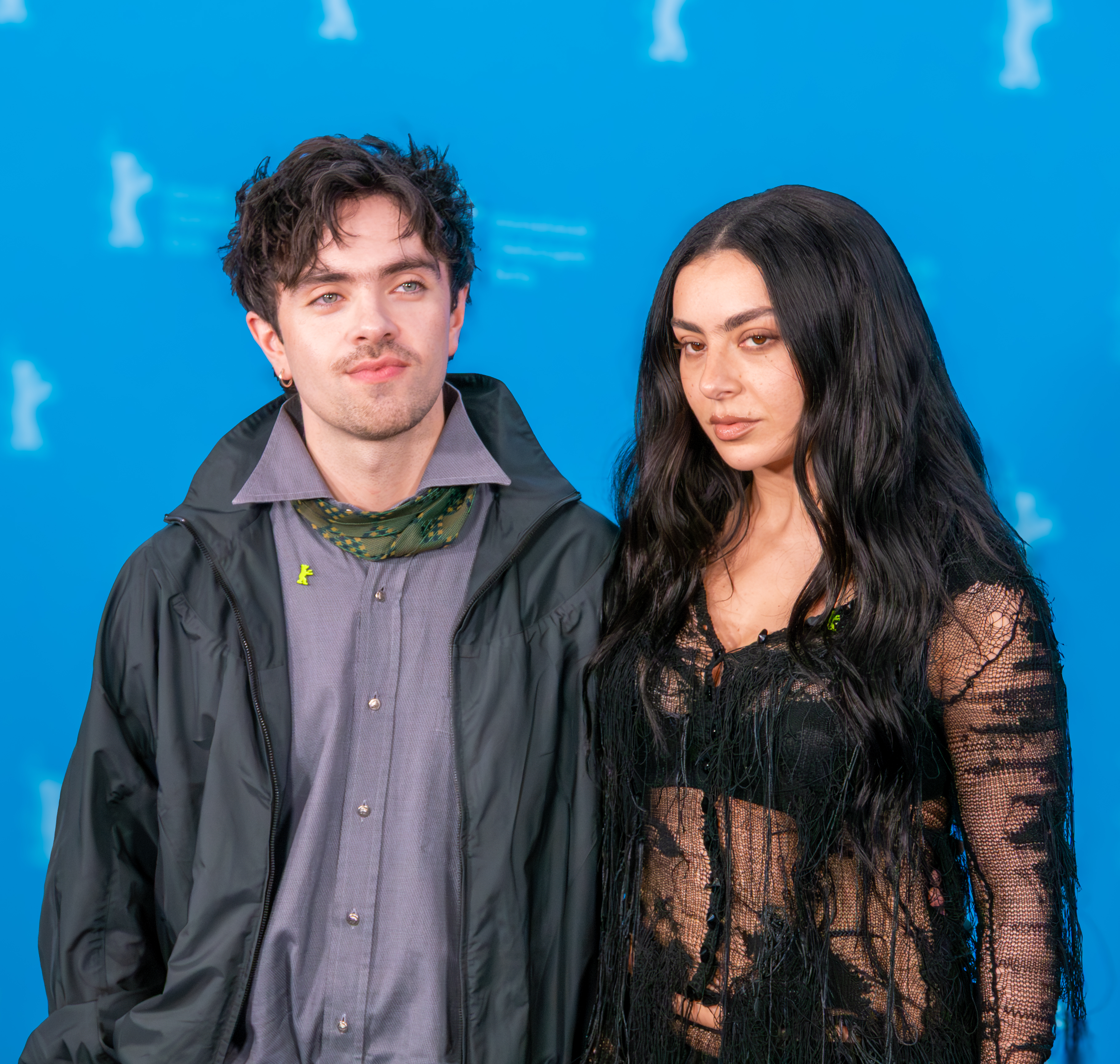
Aidan Zamiri and Charli XCX at the 76th Berlin International Film Festival

On December 9, 2025, it was announced that The Moment would have its world premiere at the 2026 Sundance Film Festival on January 23, 2026, and was released in the United States on January 30, 2026. The film had its international premiere at the Panorama section of the 76th Berlin International Film Festival.

The film debuted at four theaters in New York and Los Angeles as a limited release during the weekend commencing January 31, 2026, and expanded to more theaters for the United States' general wide release commencing February 6, 2026.

== Reception ==
=== Box office ===
The Moment became A24's fastest-selling limited release to date. Following the film's premiere at the Sundance Film Festival the previous week, more than 50 screenings sold out across key markets. The film attracted a predominantly younger audience, with the majority of ticket buyers under the age of 35. Tickets for Alamo Drafthouse screenings featuring a livestreamed question-and-answer session with Charli XCX and Aidan Zamiri also sold out and began appearing on secondary resale websites and Reddit. More than 70% of the film's premium large-format screenings had sold out ahead of its wide release on February 6. During its nationwide expansion the following weekend, The Moment played in more than 500 locations across North America. Its four-screen debut was the third-largest limited opening of the previous five years, behind Marty Supreme and Asteroid City. During the expansion, the film outperformed several other releases, including Marty Supreme and Hamnet. It grossed approximately $1.7 million at the domestic box office during the weekend, with a per-theater average of roughly $3,000. This represented an increase of nearly 300% over its debut weekend, when it grossed approximately $425,000 from four locations. The film was expected to expand further and had grossed approximately $2.2 million domestically to date.

=== Critical response ===
On the review aggregator website Rotten Tomatoes, 67% of 147 critics' reviews are positive, with an average rating of 6.1/10. The website's consensus reads: "Satirizing Brat Summer and the pitfalls of pop stardom, The Moment is a mockumentary that could've used sharper barbs, but Charli XCX acquits herself well as a presence that can bind even an unwieldy movie together." On Metacritic, the film has a weighted average score of 53 out of 100 based on 36 critics, which the site labels as "mixed or average" reviews.

In a B-graded review, Gregory Ellwood of The Playlist found the film to be less a conventional mockumentary than an anxiety-driven alternate-timeline drama that gradually builds genuine tension and deconstructs the Brat phenomenon. He praised Charli XCX and Skarsgård, but thought the film is overly long and not consistently funny given its mockumentary positioning. Adrian Horton of The Guardian published a mixed review, praising its core concept and execution, including its cinematography, visual palette, and Cook's score. However, she criticized the film as shallow and inert, with "defanged" satire, muddled themes, limited comedic payoff, and a lead performance that she deemed less effective than the supporting cast.

The Hollywood Reporter gave a negative review, describing it as a "muddled mockumentary" that was "more fan service than funny." Owen Gleiberman of Variety also wrote a negative review. He praised Charli XCX's screen presence and the film's early observational depiction of the pop-industry apparatus around her, but criticized its subdued mockumentary approach, implausible central premise, and a poorly articulated late plotline that he argued undermined the satire.

For Screen Rant, the film is a "horribly misguided mockumentary" and an "unmitigated disaster" that fails both as comedy and as character drama. The film was criticized as shapeless, low-stakes, poorly directed, and built on implausible conflicts and underdeveloped satire.
