= Richard Turley =

Richard Turley may refer to:

- Richard E. Turley Jr. (born 1956), American historian and genealogist
- Richard Marggraf Turley (born 1970), British literary critic, poet and novelist
- Richard Turley (graphic designer), English creative director and graphic designer
