= Blink Twice =

2024 film by Zoë Kravitz

- Theatrical release poster
- Directed by: Zoë Kravitz
- Written by: Zoë Kravitz; E.T. Feigenbaum
- Produced by: Bruce Cohen; Tiffany Persons; Garret Levitz; Zoë Kravitz; Channing Tatum
- Starring: Naomi Ackie; Channing Tatum; Christian Slater; Simon Rex; Adria Arjona; Kyle MacLachlan; Haley Joel Osment; Geena Davis; Alia Shawkat
- Cinematography: Adam Newport-Berra
- Edited by: Kathryn J. Schubert
- Music by: Chanda Dancy
- Production companies: Metro-Goldwyn-Mayer Pictures; Free Association; this is important; Bold Choices
- Distributed by: Amazon MGM Studios (United States); Warner Bros. Pictures (International)
- Release dates: August 8, 2024 (DGA Theater); August 23, 2024 (United States)
- Running time: 102 minutes
- Country: United States
- Language: English
- Budget: $20 million
- Box office: $48.1 million

Blink Twice is a 2024 American psychological thriller film directed and produced by Zoë Kravitz (in her directorial debut) from a script she wrote with E.T. Feigenbaum. The film stars Naomi Ackie, Channing Tatum, Christian Slater, Simon Rex, Adria Arjona, Haley Joel Osment, Kyle MacLachlan, Geena Davis, and Alia Shawkat. It tells the story of a group of people invited to the private island of a billionaire tech mogul as something strange and sinister happens with the attendees.

Blink Twice premiered at the DGA Theater in Los Angeles on August 8, 2024, and was released in the United States on August 23 by Amazon MGM Studios. The film grossed $48 million worldwide on a $20 million production budget, and received generally positive reviews from critics.

== Plot ==
Animal-themed nail artist and cocktail waitress Frida works an exclusive gala with her friend, Jess. There, billionaire tech mogul Slater King invites both of them to his private island. Upon arrival, Slater's assistant Stacy confiscates their phones. Also on the island are Slater's friends and business partners Vic, Cody, Tom, and Lucas. The other women invited consist of Sarah, Camilla, and Heather. The women are treated lavishly, including potent hallucinogens. Frida clashes with Sarah over Slater's intentions while Jess notices lapses in her memory. The local workers sport the same snake tattoo, and Frida has strange encounters with a maid who seems to recognize her and calls her "Red Rabbit".

Slater's therapist, Rich, visits and receives a red gift bag. During a night of partying, Jess is bitten by a snake. Later, Frida shuts down Jess's pleas to flee the island. The next morning, Frida finds a hut with dozens of red gift bags. She encounters the maid, who convinces her to drink snake venom, causing fleeting flashbacks of disturbing events. At breakfast, Frida realizes that Jess is missing, but the other women don't remember her. Suspicious of their memory lapses, the women go to the hut. They find bottles of perfume made from an indigenous flower whose scent can erase memories. Discerning that the snake venom is an antidote to the flower's effects, Frida persuades Sarah to drink some, at which point Sarah's memory begins to return. They realize that the women were brought to the island to be systematically raped and sexually assaulted by the men.

Sarah and Frida give the other women the antidote. Frida finds their broken phones in Slater's office. Frida finds photos of other women and men with red gift bags, revealing that Slater invites guests to rape women and wipe out their memories. The men are given the perfume to use when they leave the island. Frida's memories fully return, and she recalls the men brutally raping the women every night and wiping away their memories with the perfume. They killed Jess because her memories could not be erased, as she was bitten by the snake and had venom in her system.

That night, Frida and Sarah attempt to maintain the façade at dinner, whilst preparing for their escape. Frida has a memory of Slater setting up Rich to rape her the same night he was on the island; Slater assures him Frida will not remember the assault. Camilla and Heather's memories return, and they are horrified by their experiences. Camilla stabs Tom to death while Heather badly injures Vic before being fatally shot by Stan, Slater's security guard. Slater kills Camilla, and the men hide in Slater's villa, where he mocks a perfumed and confused Lucas for doing nothing while being complicit in their crimes.

Stacy attacks Frida, preferring to be ignorant of the truth, which forces Frida to stab her to death. Stan chases Frida but is bludgeoned to death by Sarah, who takes his gun. Cody is ordered to go out and look for the women but is shot and killed by Sarah. In the villa, Lucas is shot in a trap Frida and Sarah set for Slater. Afterward, Slater traps Frida in the villa. It is revealed that Frida was on the island the year before, was raped and assaulted by Slater, and bit off Vic's pinky finger before her memories were wiped. The maid recognized Frida from her red rabbit fingernails, hence her naming earlier.

When Slater leaves the villa to search for Sarah, Frida laces his vape with the perfume. He returns with Sarah and, just as he attempts to kill her, takes a puff. The effects make him forget the previous events and panic upon seeing the bodies. Slater slips and knocks himself unconscious as the villa catches fire. Frida and Sarah escape, leaving Vic to die but saving Slater.

Some time later, Rich encounters a disorientated Slater at another gala. Frida is now married to Slater and CEO of his company, using vape juice made from the flower to keep him confused. She has Rich removed from the gala as she is recognized for her accomplishments.

== Cast ==
- Naomi Ackie as Frida, an animal-themed nail artist and cocktail waitress
- Channing Tatum as Slater King, a billionaire tech mogul
- Alia Shawkat as Jess, Frida's best friend
- Christian Slater as Vic, Slater's business partner
- Simon Rex as Cody, a private chef and Slater's childhood friend
- Adria Arjona as Sarah, a reality show star
- Haley Joel Osment as Tom, a former child star
- Liz Caribel as Camilla, an aspiring app developer
- Levon Hawke as Lucas, a rising employee of Slater's company
- Trew Mullen as Heather, a lawyer and stoner
- Geena Davis as Stacy, Slater's personal assistant
- Kyle MacLachlan as Rich, Slater’s therapist
- Cris Costa as Stan, Slater's security guard
- María Elena Olivares as badass maid
- Saul Williams as emcee
- Tiffany Persons as interviewer
- Aaron Himelstein as asshole manager
- Zoë Kravitz as swanky stewardess

== Production ==
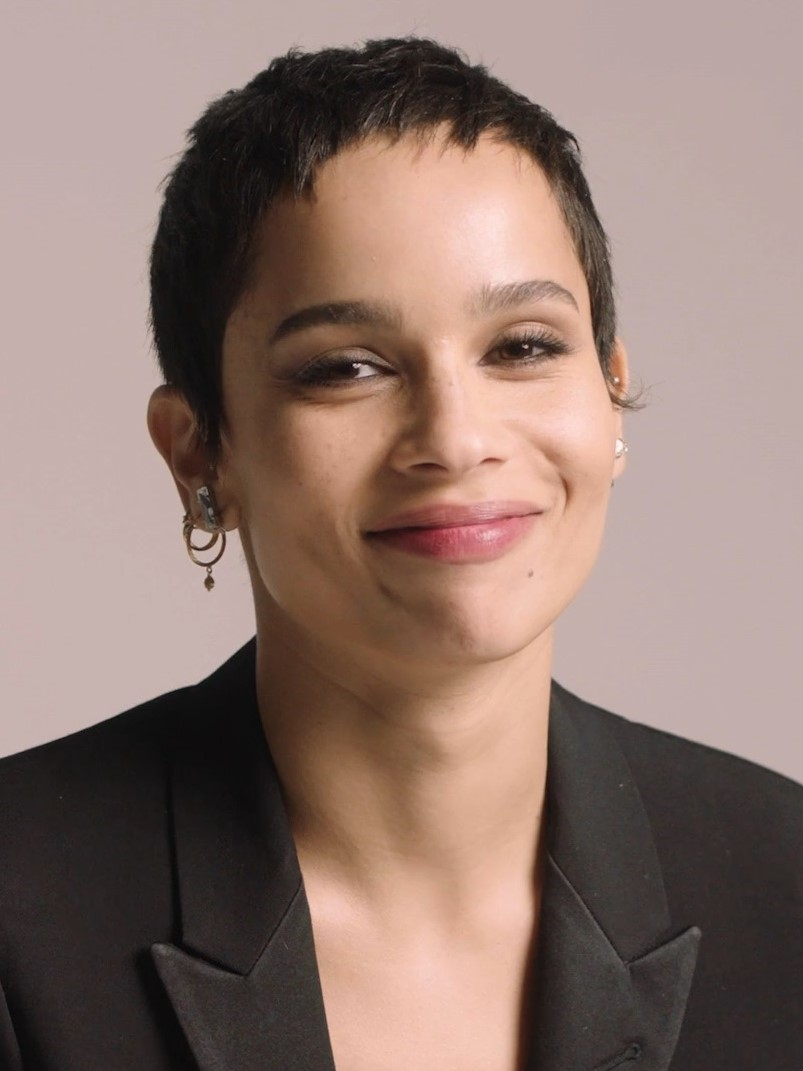
Writer-director Zoë Kravitz

Zoë Kravitz started writing Blink Twice under the working title Pussy Island in 2017. In June 2021, Kravitz announced that she would make her directorial debut with the film from a script co-written with E.T. Feigenbaum. Channing Tatum signed on to star and at the Cannes Film Market, MGM won the distribution rights as Naomi Ackie was cast as Frida, the film's lead role. The rest of the cast was announced from May to June 2022, with Jordan Harkins and Stacy Perskie joining the film as executive producers.

Filming began on June 23, 2022, with production occurring in Yucatán and Quintana Roo, Mexico. In January 2024, the film's title was changed from Pussy Island to Blink Twice; Kravitz explained that issues formed with the Motion Picture Association (MPA) "not wanting to put it on a poster, or a billboard, or a kiosk; movie theaters not wanting to put it on a ticket" but also mentioned, "Interestingly enough, after researching it, women were offended by the word, and women seeing the title were saying, 'I don't want to see that movie,' which is part of the reason I wanted to try and use the word, which is trying to reclaim the word, and not make it something that we're so uncomfortable using. But we're not there yet. And I think that's something I have the responsibility as a filmmaker to listen to."

=== Music ===
Blink Twice (Original Motion Picture Soundtrack)

Film score by Chanda Dancy
- Released: August 23, 2024
- Genres: Electronic; orchestral
- Length: 18:28
- Label: Lakeshore Records
- Producer: Chanda Dancy

Chanda Dancy chronology
Lawmen: Bass Reeves (Original Series Soundtrack) (2023)	Blink Twice (Original Motion Picture Soundtrack) (2024)

The film score was composed by Chanda Dancy, who got involved after a music supervisor at MGM sought her out. Dancy and Kravitz collaborated by sending each other clips of sounds they would hear in the wild, and had a number of inspirations ranging from gagaku to Igor Stravinsky's compositions to Indonesian drumming to the theme song from Fantasy Island. The soundtrack album was released digitally on August 23, 2024, through Lakeshore Records, with its first two tracks released by ComingSoon.net the previous day. The film additionally features songs like LCD Soundsystem's "Dance Yrself Clean", James Brown's "People Get Up and Drive Your Funky Soul", and "Ain't Nobody" by Rufus and Chaka Khan. Dancy's score was shortlisted for Best Original Score at the 97th Academy Awards.

All tracks are written by Chanda Dancy.

Blink Twice (Original Motion Picture Soundtrack) track listing
No.	Title	Length
1.	"Lizard Eyes"	0:57
2.	"A Partita"	1:28
3.	"Tag"	1:05
4.	"Remembering"	1:57
5.	"The Pool"	2:13
6.	"Spa Day"	1:05
7.	"The Snake"	2:25
8.	"Koolaid on the Cult Robe"	2:08
9.	"Hide and Seek"	1:15
10.	"Frantic"	1:45
11.	"Fire"	2:05

== Release ==
Blink Twice premiered at the DGA Theater in Los Angeles on August 8, 2024, and it was released in the United States by Amazon MGM Studios on August 23, 2024, with Warner Bros. Pictures releasing the film internationally on August 21, 2024. On August 21, Amazon issued a trigger warning for the film on Twitter for "mature themes and depictions of violence – including sexual violence", which Variety noted was rare for a studio to do but part of a growing trend in Hollywood beyond MPA ratings. The warning was also attached before theatrical screenings and streaming prints.

== Reception ==
=== Box office ===
Blink Twice has grossed $23.1 million in the United States and Canada, and $23.3 million in other nations and territories, for a worldwide total of $46.4 million.

In the United States and Canada, Blink Twice was released alongside The Crow and The Forge, and was projected to gross $7–8 million from 3,067 theaters in its opening weekend. The film made $2.9 million on its first day, including an estimated $820,000 from Thursday night previews. It went on to debut to $7.3 million, finishing fourth at the box office. The film made $4.8 million in its second weekend.

=== Critical response ===
On the review aggregator website Rotten Tomatoes, 75% of 221 critics' reviews are positive, with an average rating of 6.7/10. The website's consensus reads: "A bold and memorable debut that thrusts Zoë Kravitz into the turf of directors to watch, Blink Twice is a live wire of a film." Metacritic, which uses a weighted average, assigned the film a score of 66 out of 100, based on 45 critics, indicating "generally favorable" reviews. Audiences polled by CinemaScore gave the film an average grade of "B–" on an A+ to F scale, while those at PostTrak gave the film an overall positive score of 74% (including an average of 3 out of 5 stars), with 50% saying they would definitely recommend it.

Time Out's Ian Freer described the film as "one of the wildest rides of 2024", stating, "It's a film about the abuses of power, the dangers of being a woman in a man's world and the importance of female solidarity, but is never didactic, just gripping. In short, Blink Twice is both brainfood and a blast." Writing for The Atlantic, Shirley Li labeled the film "a sharp and exciting debut with a strong emotional point of view", while Peter Travers praised it as a promising directorial debut despite its predictability. Wendy Ide of The Guardian rated the film 4 out of 5 stars, lauding it as "slickly efficient", "highly entertaining", and "visually rich". She notes that while some elements of the screenplay may not withstand rigorous scrutiny, the "glorious savagery" of the final act more than compensates for it. Filmmaker Malcolm Washington cited it as one of his favorite films of 2024. Likewise, Mick LaSalle of San Francisco Chronicle declared Blink Twice "one of the most interesting and satisfying movies of 2024", commending Kravitz's "precise directorial hand" and the "smart and imaginative script".

In a review for RogerEbert.com, Peyton Robinson gave the film 1 out of 4 stars, stating that it fails to meaningfully engage with its themes about "the sinister capabilities of rich white men." She criticizes the writing as a "chop shop of buzzwords" that lacks depth and nuance, merely calling out issues without exploring them, making it "an affirmation of a tired, simple narrative toolbox being sold as unflinching feminist grit." Robinson describes the film's humor as "unfunny" and ineffective, stating it doesn't earn laughs or manage serious topics with intelligence. She praises the performances, especially Tatum's and Ackie's, but ultimately concludes that the film is a "homespun exploitation" with a "pretentious conclusion", lacking the courage needed for impactful storytelling. Robinson's review for Blink Twice aligns with Ross McIndoe of Slant Magazine, who noted that the film "has thoughts about the danger that men can pose", but criticized it for offering only a surface-level understanding of these dynamics. Brooks Eisenbise of Chicago Reader called it "clumsy and overworked yet valiant endeavor" and asserted that as a thriller, "it's a cliched and badly paced mess."

Odie Henderson of The Boston Globe argued that while the film attempts a feminist message, "it's ultimately just a slasher movie with a bunch of one-dimensional Final Girls." He notes that the plot unravels upon closer examination, and its slow pacing allows ample time to reflect on it while still in the theater, failing to maintain the brisk pacing necessary to suspend disbelief. Henderson notes that the film's initial half presents a series of repetitive scenes where characters engage in drinking, substance use, and poolside lounging, and contends that Kravitz's reliance on these sequences fails to provide any visual intrigue or meaningful character development, making the film look like "a boring reality TV show."

=== Accolades ===
Award	Date of ceremony	Category	Recipient(s)	Result	Ref.
Astra Film Awards	December 8, 2024	Best First Feature	Zoë Kravitz	Nominated	
Austin Film Critics Association Awards	January 6, 2025	Best First Film	Zoë Kravitz	Nominated	
Black Reel Awards	February 10, 2025	Outstanding Independent Film	Blink Twice	Nominated	
Black Reel Awards	February 10, 2025	Outstanding Director	Zoë Kravitz	Nominated	
Black Reel Awards	February 10, 2025	Outstanding First Screenplay	Zoë Kravitz	Nominated	
Black Reel Awards	February 10, 2025	Outstanding Lead Performance	Naomi Ackie	Nominated	
Black Reel Awards	February 10, 2025	Outstanding Breakthrough Performance	Naomi Ackie	Nominated	
NAACP Image Awards	February 22, 2025	Outstanding Breakthrough Creative (Motion Picture)	Zoë Kravitz	Nominated	
San Diego Film Critics Society Awards	December 9, 2024	Best First Feature (Director)	Zoë Kravitz	Won	
