= Trew Mullen =

American actress

Trew Mullen is an American actress.

== Filmography ==
- Callback (Upcoming film)
- The Moment (2026)
- Blink Twice (2024)
