= Nuts (fashion magazine) =

- Categories: Fashion
- First issue: September 2023

Nuts is an experimental magazine founded by Richard Turley.

== History ==
The magazine's title was inspired by the colloquial use of the word, to mean something mad. It shares its title with the defunct British lad mag of the same name, which Turley considered to be a personification of the early 2000s, while the modern Nuts is a personification of the 2020s. He noted that the shared title was meant to draw attention to "the distance between those two points, this sort of collapse and rebuild, the similar obsessions (bodies, sexuality, power, titillation, humour) expressed very, very differently."

It is published by Food, a creative agency co-founded by Turley. While the magazine is focused on clothing and fashion, it does not contain advertisements or luxury brand collaborations. The clothes featured are primarily mainstream apparel instead of luxury clothing, and the photographs were predominantly taken by stylists and models, rather than fashion photographers.

The photographs are drum scanned by hand to create a "uniform, flattened black-and-white" appearance across them. The technique was adopted partly to reduce the cost of printing, and was inspired by the Whole Earth Catalog and Japanese photo books. It is printed on non-glossy paper. Each issue is around 400 pages and its size has been compared to a phone book. Several publications emphasized the magazine's physicality, which is shaped by its broad, lightweight pages and large size. The first issue of Nuts was published in September 2023.

== Reception ==
The Guardian's Alex Rayner described it as an "exciting and intriguing publication, which looks both new, while also echoing Hal Fischer’s Gay Semiotics photo books from the 1970s, Apartamento's documentary-style reportage, and the best, most free-form seconds from 1990s and early 2000s editions of British style mags." Laird Borrelli-Persson of Vogue wrote that "Like a shell contains a nut, so Nuts hold contradictions", describing its core takeaway as "Seek and you shall find style that exists outside the boundaries drawn by the industry."

Jeremy Leslie of magCulture called it "a brilliant sleight of hand: a fashion mag that isn't a fashion mag. For both its physicality and its abstract conceptualism, it sits well next to Turley’s last self-published project, Civilization."
