= Fancam =

Fan-created video montages for social media

An edit of Wikipe-tan, featuring numerous images of the animated character paired alongside music by Starmoon

A fancam, also known as fan edit or edit is a fan-made montage video of a celebrity or film set to music. The New York Times calls the videos "unofficial trailers" often going viral. Some focus on specific, overlooked character traits and others, called thirst edits, highlight the sex appeal of actors.

Subjects of fancams have been animated characters like Snoopy, business executives, music artists like Ed Sheeran, and TV shows such as Succession. Fancams of Pedro Pascal inspired a 2023 Saturday Night Live sketch.

== History ==
In 1975, a fan named Kandy Fong created a slide show of Star Trek outtakes in which she performed a live parody folk song called "What Do Your Do With A Drunken Vulcan?" while showing photos from the show. The New York Times calls her creation the earliest fan edit.

When a popular fan edit showed Kendall Roy from Succession acting helpless as the song "Thursday Girl" by Mitski played in the background. Mitski said it was “the best thing that's happened” to her on the internet.

== Usage in K-pop ==
In K-pop terminology, a fancam is a full focus on a specific K-pop idol in a K-pop group. One of the major fancams to go viral was Hani of K-pop girl group EXID dancing to Up & Down. In 2020, K-pop fans spammed fancams under far-right movements such as #WhiteLivesMatter tweets.
