= Brat (album) =

2024 studio album by Charli XCX

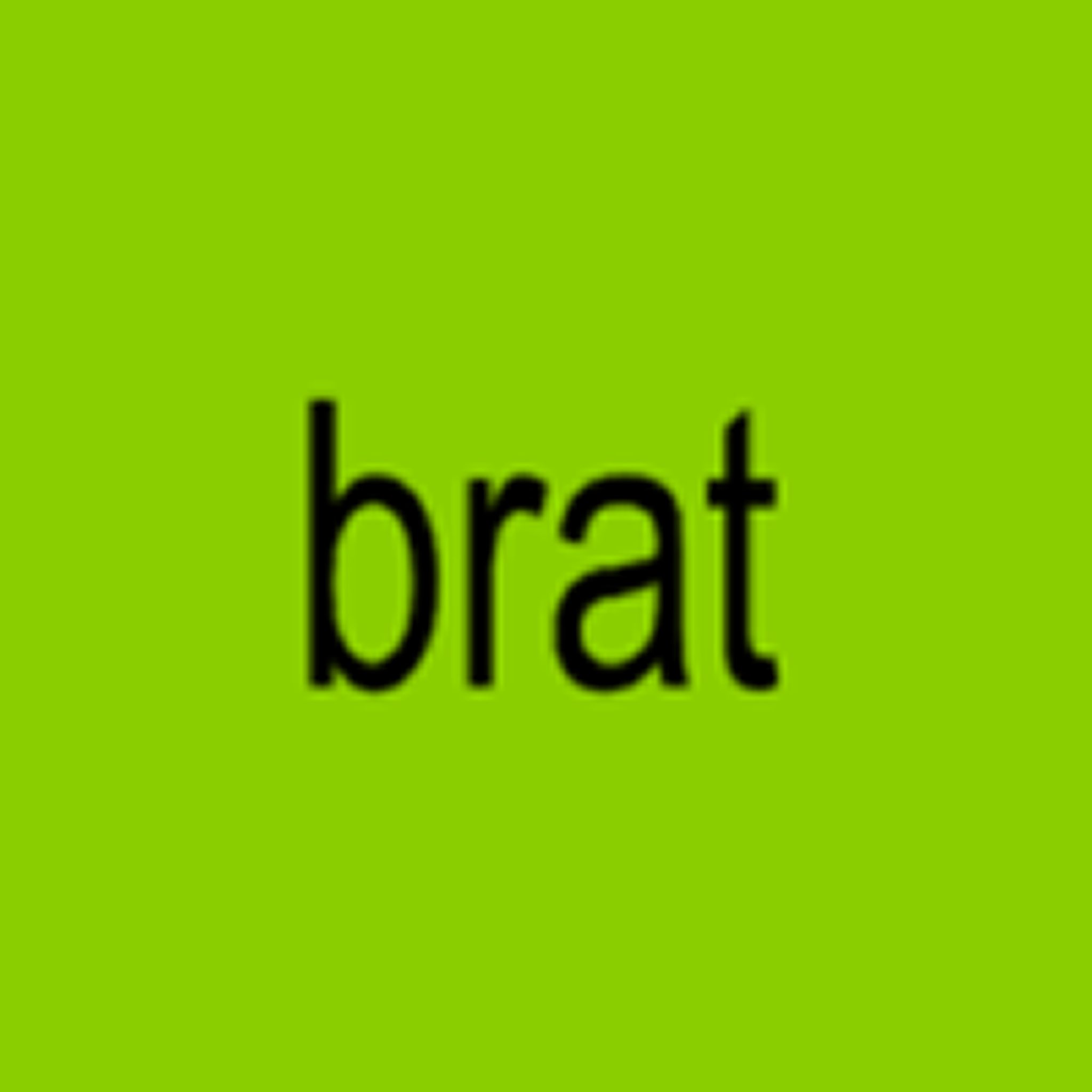
- Standard edition cover

Studio album by Charli XCX
- Released: 7 June 2024
- Recorded: 2023–2024
- Studios: Sleeper Sounds (London); Henson (Hollywood); Westlake (West Hollywood); A2F (Miami); Larrabee (North Hollywood); The Nest (Southampton)
- Genres: Electropop; synth-pop; club-pop; hyperpop; dance; electroclash
- Length: 41:23
- Label: Atlantic
- Producers: A. G. Cook; Cirkut; George Daniel; Charli XCX; Gesaffelstein; Finn Keane; Hudson Mohawke; El Guincho; Jon Shave; Linus Wiklund; Omer Fedi

Charli XCX chronology
Bottoms (2023)	Brat (2024)	Brat and It's Completely Different but Also Still Brat (2024)

Alternative cover
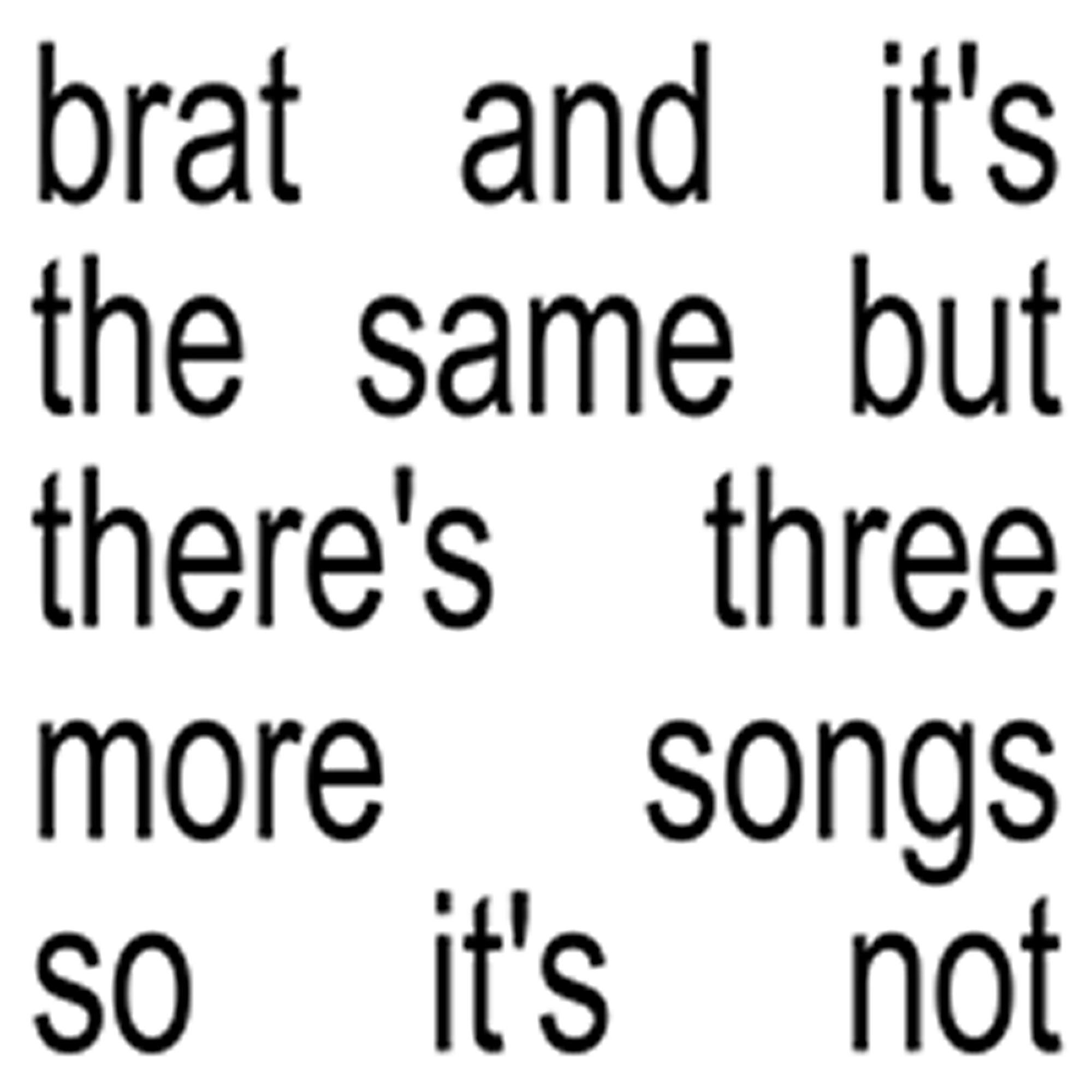
- Deluxe edition cover

Singles from Brat (Note: The remixed versions of "Guess", "Talk Talk" and "Everything Is Romantic" were also released as singles during the Brat era.)
- 1. "Von Dutch" Released: 29 February 2024; 2. "360" Released: 10 May 2024; 3. "Apple" Released: 2 August 2024

Brat is the sixth studio album by British singer Charli XCX, released on 7 June 2024 through Atlantic Records. It features production by Charli XCX, her longtime executive producer A. G. Cook, Finn Keane, Cirkut, her partner George Daniel, and others. The album draws influence from the 2000s English rave music scene, with a more aggressive club sound than her previous album, Crash (2022).

Commercially, Brat peaked at number one in the UK, Australia, Croatia, Ireland and New Zealand, and reached the top ten in 14 other countries, including the United States, where it marked Charli XCX's highest debut on the Billboard 200 (number three). A deluxe edition, Brat and It's the Same but There's Three More Songs So It's Not, was released on 10 June 2024. A remix album, titled Brat and It's Completely Different but Also Still Brat, featuring 20 guest artists, was released on 11 October 2024.

According to Metacritic, which compiles scores from music critics, Brat is the highest-rated album of 2024 and was the 16th-highest-rated album on the website at the time. The album was shortlisted for the Mercury Prize for 2024 Album of the Year. The cover art and aesthetic originated the cultural phenomenon Brat Summer, and were adopted by U.S. vice president Kamala Harris's 2024 presidential campaign after Charli XCX tweeted about the candidate; however, Charli XCX later stated that she was not being political and the tweet was not meant to be a political endorsement. Brat and its songs were nominated for nine Grammy Awards at the 67th annual ceremony, including Album of the Year, winning three of them, including Best Dance/Electronic Album. During 2024–2025, Charli XCX embarked on the Sweat tour with collaborator Troye Sivan, and the solo Brat Tour in support of the album.

== Background and release ==
Brat is Charli XCX's sixth studio album and first after renewing her contract with Atlantic Records in early 2023. In September 2023, Charli XCX shared a snippet on Instagram of her recording the track "Club Classics." It was announced on 28 February 2024, a day before the release of the lead single "Von Dutch". On 22 February, during her Boiler Room warehouse set, Charli XCX debuted snippets of tracks identified as "Spring Breakers" and "365". She was joined onstage by Addison Rae and Julia Fox; a "Von Dutch" remix with Rae and A. G. Cook, was released on 22 March. On 6 March, she premiered "So I" at the Billboard Women in Music event. "Club Classics" and "B2B" were released on 3 April as a two-pack promotional single.

After teasing the song for a few days, on 29 April, Charli XCX announced the release of the next single, "360". It was released on 10 May alongside its music video, which was teased earlier that day, and was described by her as her "best music video ever". The video features multiple "it girls", including Gabbriette, Chloë Sevigny, Julia Fox, and Rachel Sennott. A remix of "360" soon followed, featuring Swedish artists Robyn and Yung Lean, which was released on 31 May. During her 1 June headlining set at Barcelona's Primavera Sound festival, she debuted two unreleased songs live, "365" and "Everything Is Romantic".

Brat was released on 7 June 2024. A deluxe edition, titled Brat and It's the Same but There's Three More Songs So It's Not, was released on 10 June, containing three additional songs. On 21 June, a remix version of "Girl, So Confusing" featuring New Zealand singer Lorde was released. On 1 August 2024, a remix version of "Guess" from the deluxe edition was released featuring singer Billie Eilish. The following day, "Apple" was released to Italian radio as the album's third single. On 12 September, a "Talk Talk" remix featuring singer Troye Sivan was released along with the announcement of a remix album titled Brat and It's Completely Different but Also Still Brat which was released on 11 October 2024.

== Composition ==
Brat channels the illegal London rave scene, where Charli XCX started performing as a teenager. She called it her "most aggressive and confrontational record", but also her most vulnerable. She also stated that Brat "is probably the closest album to [her 2017 mixtape] Pop 2 in its ethos". Its music has been described variously by journalists as electropop, synth-pop, club-pop, hyperpop, electroclash, and dance. Charli XCX told Billboard's Katie Bain that Brat is produced from a tight collection of sounds to create "this unique minimalism that is very loud and bold". The Face's Shaad D'Souza compared the album's sound to 2000s-era Ministry of Sound compilations The Annual and Rihanna's 2010 album Loud, calling the lyrics "shady and bratty, but tender and heartbreaking".

Charli XCX has confirmed that track "Girl, So Confusing" explores her contentious relationship with a fellow female artist. Listeners speculated that the track was about Marina Diamandis, Rina Sawayama, or Lorde, the latter of whom the track was later confirmed to be written about. Lorde then appeared on the song's remix version. "Sympathy Is a Knife" alludes to another similar situation; the song has been speculated to be about her relationship with Taylor Swift, as well as Charli XCX's perception of her relationship with the 1975's lead singer Matty Healy.

"Rewind" was written as a direct response to the success of "Speed Drive" from Barbie the Album. "Mean Girls", a song partially inspired by actress and model Julia Fox as well as podcast host Dasha Nekrasova, focuses on society's "fascination with mean girls". The Face called the track "So I" "a knotty exploration of her grief about [the death of] Sophie". "Apple" was written with inspiration from the writing style of Charli XCX's close friend and collaborator Caroline Polachek. "I Think About It All the Time" sees Charli XCX contemplating motherhood after meeting her friend and collaborator Noonie Bao's baby. In an interview before Brat's release, she said: "am I less of a woman if I don't have a kid? Will I feel like I've missed out on my purpose in life? I know we're not supposed to say that, but it's this biological and social programming."

Brat's deluxe version adds three new songs. "Hello Goodbye" was described as "crush-addled". On "Guess", Charli XCX challenges a subject to guess the colour of her underwear, which critics called "unapologetically flirty and suggestive". "Spring Breakers" suggests that Charli XCX's edginess bars her from music industry events such as the Grammy Awards.

== Artwork and marketing ==
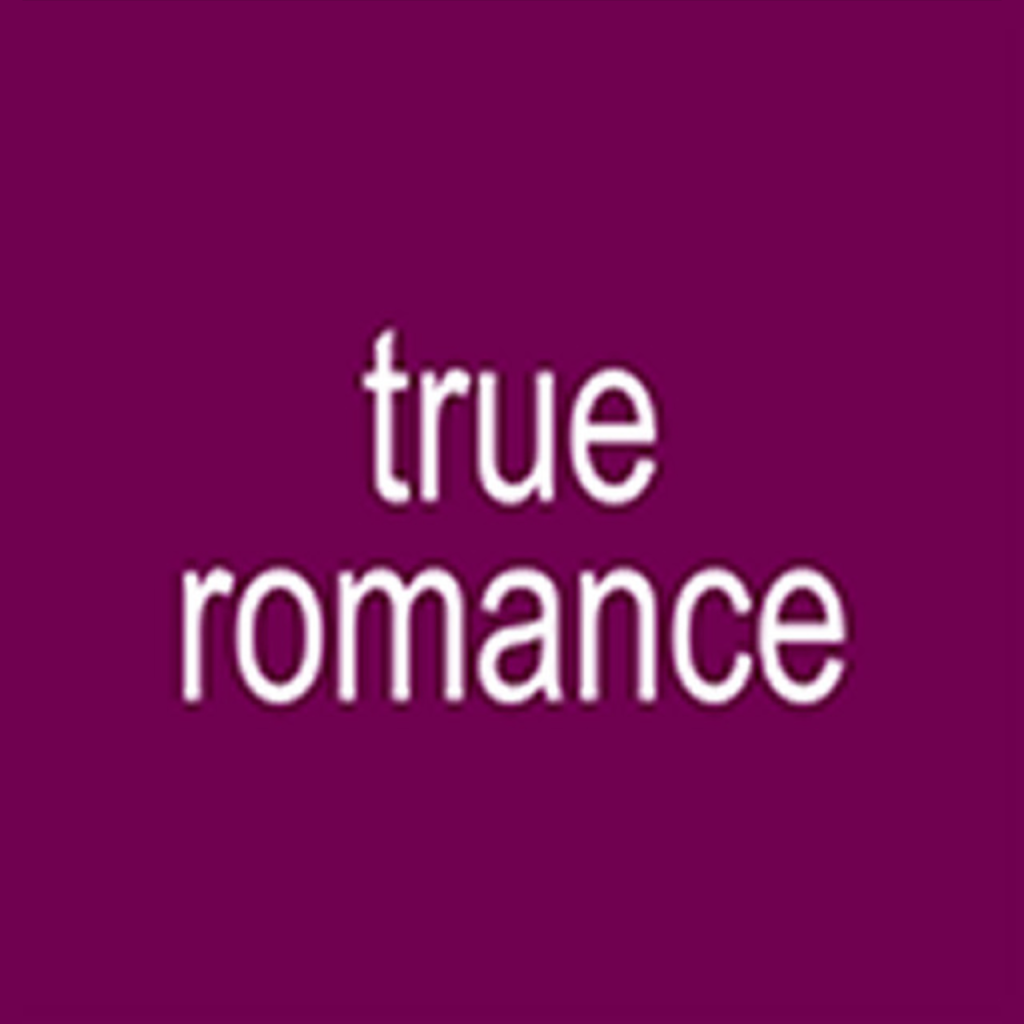
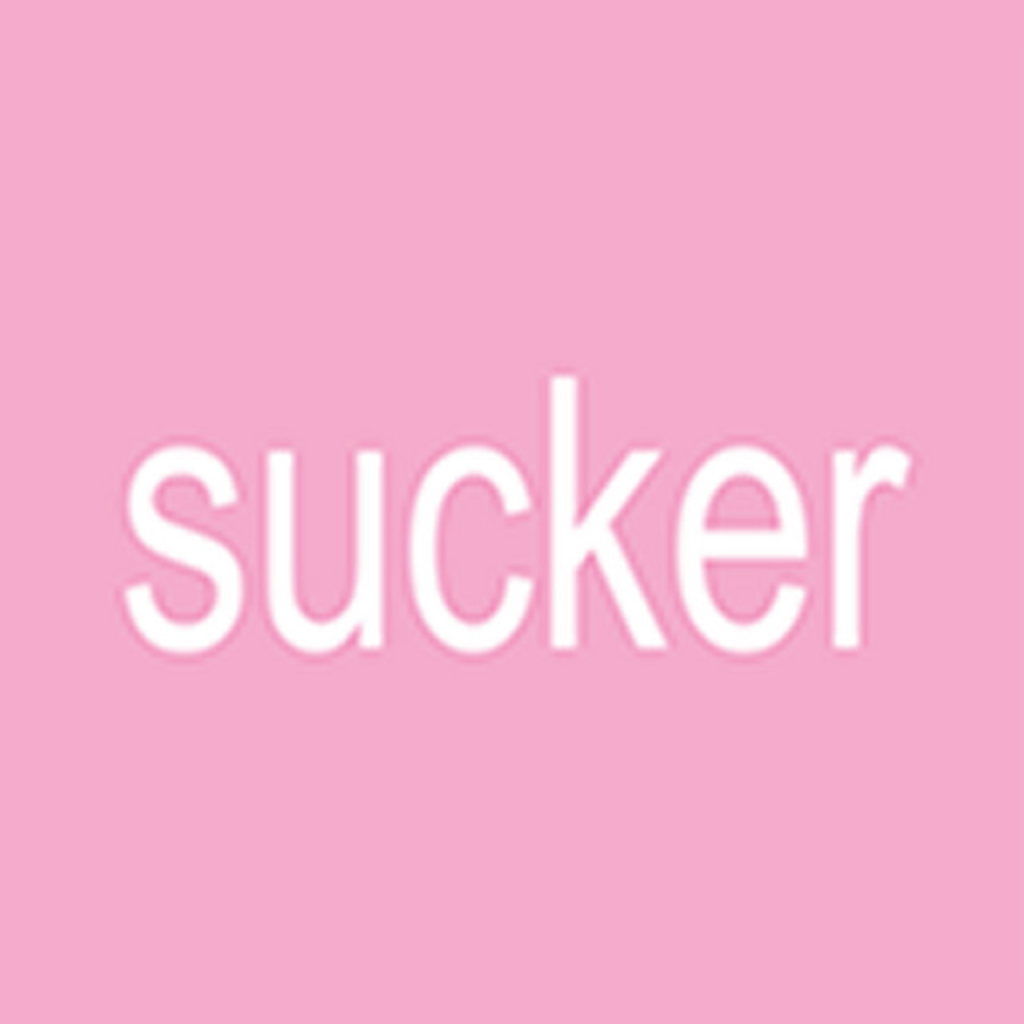
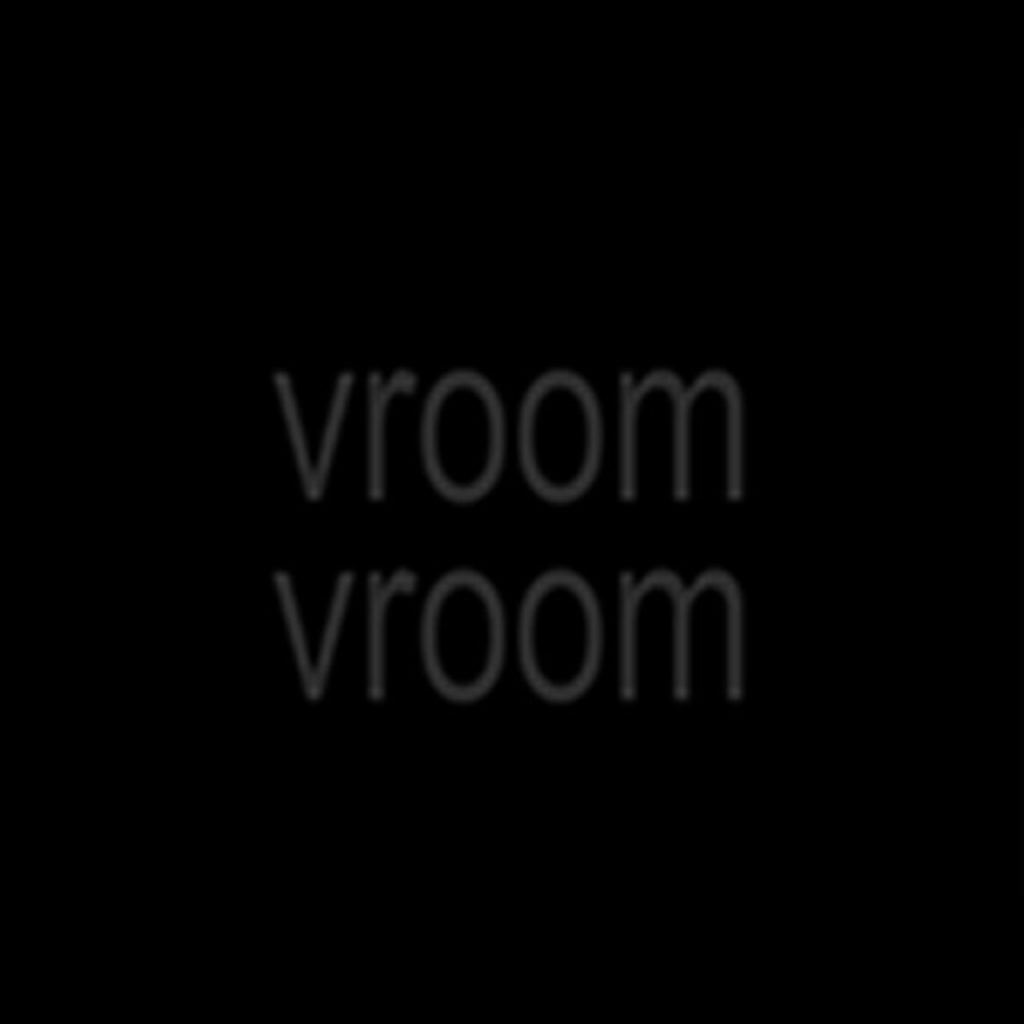
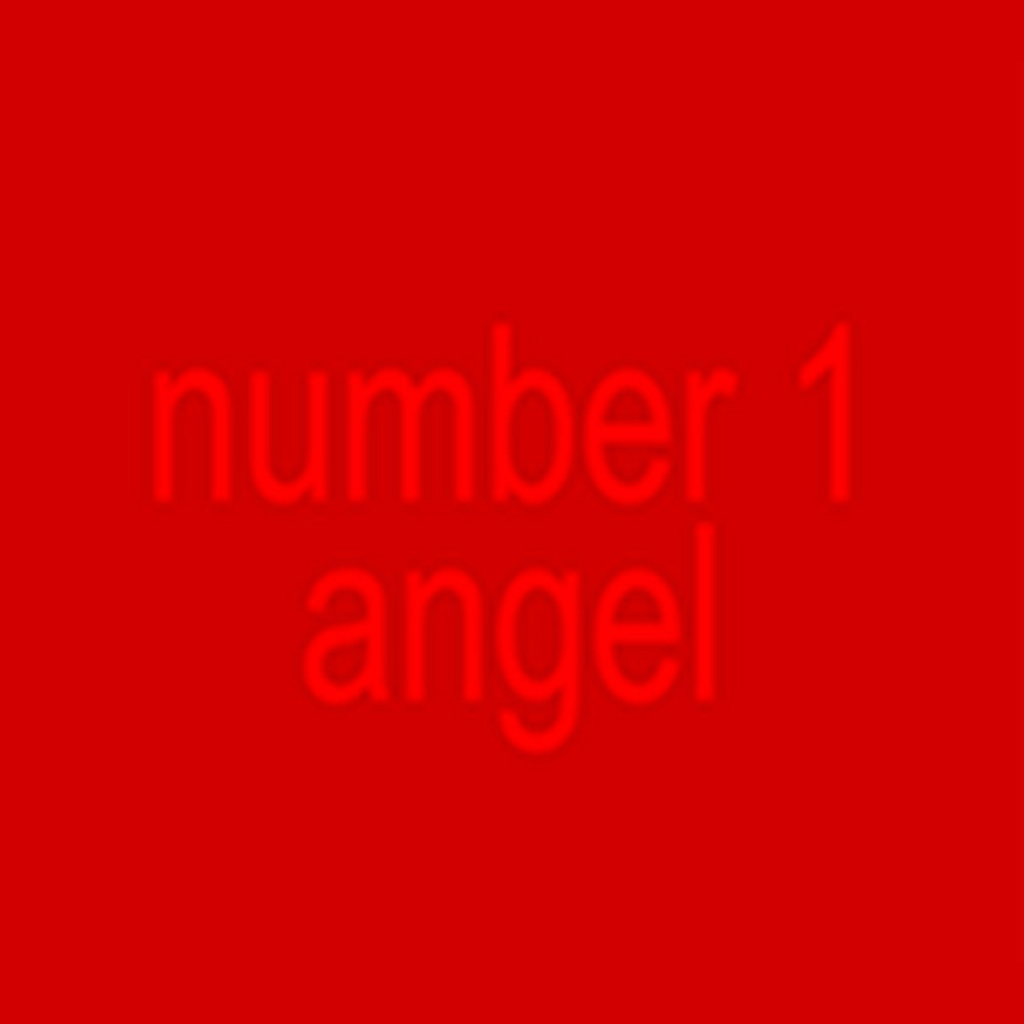
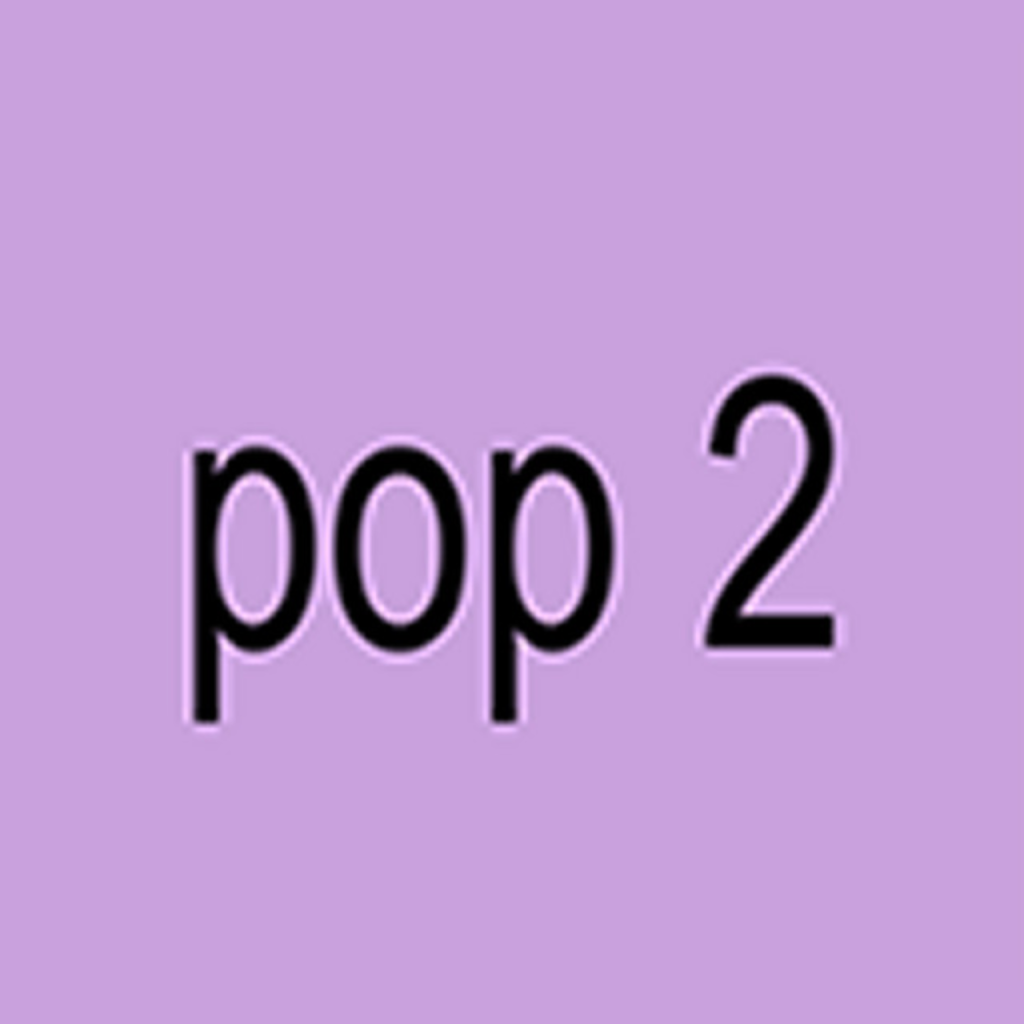
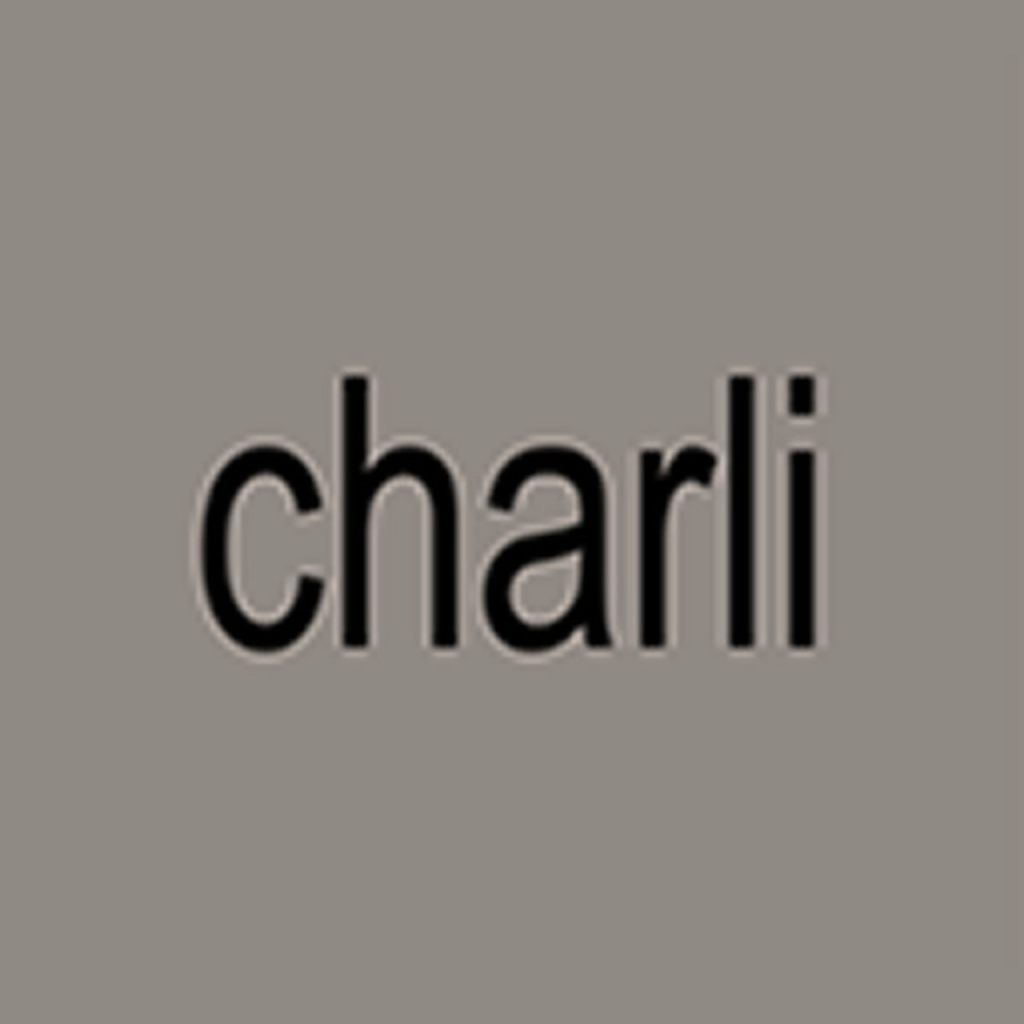
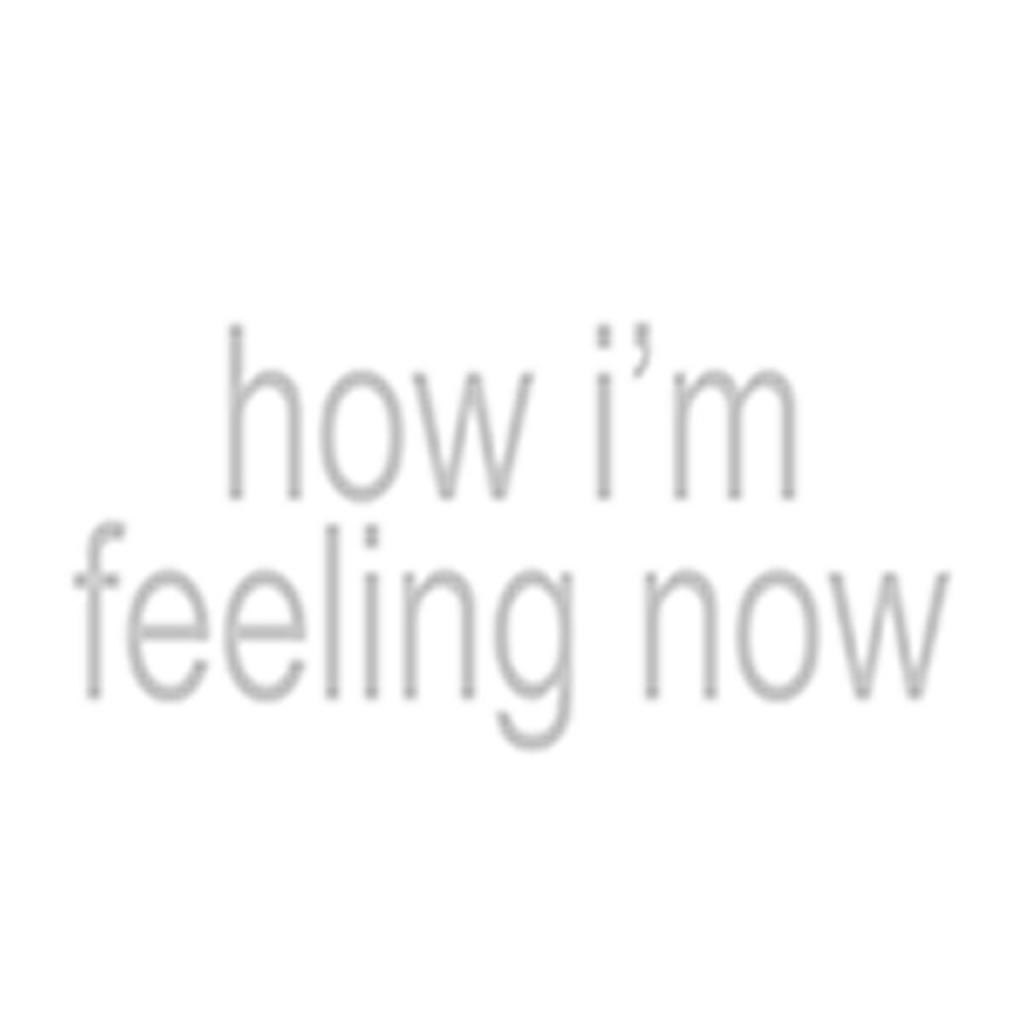
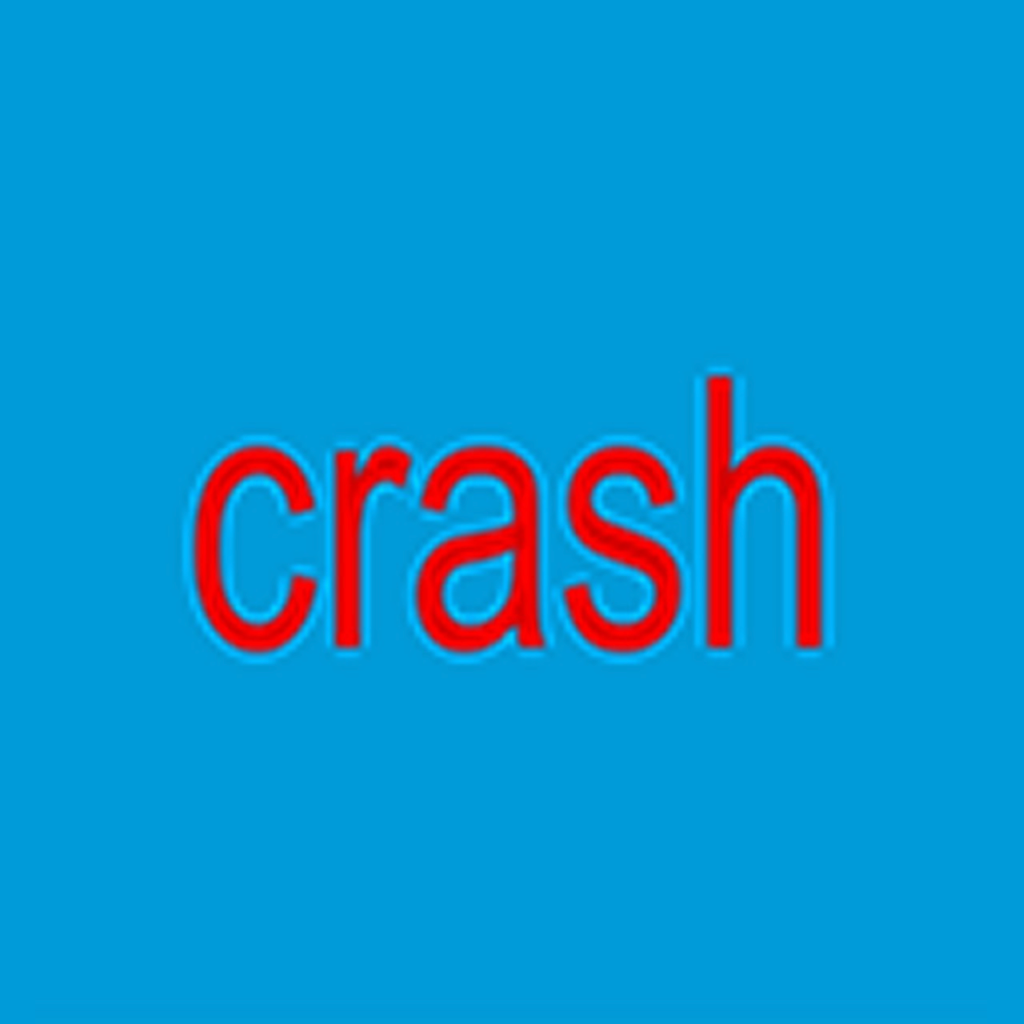
Anticipating the release of Brat, the cover art of Charli XCX's discography was updated across streaming platforms to match its appearance. On 9 May 2025 (the day "Party 4 U" became a single), the original icon of How I'm Feeling Now returned to represent its fifth anniversary. The original covers for the remaining albums returned on 30 June 2025.

Brat's artwork and packaging was designed by New York City–based studio Special Offer, Inc. The cover is a lime green square with the title in lowercase imposed in Arial font. In a cover story interview for Vogue Singapore, Charli XCX told Chandreyee Ray that criticism led her to question why fans feel "ownership over female artists" so much so that they demand their photograph be on all their work; she had previously called it "misogynistic and boring" on Twitter. Of the album cover's colour—which is Pantone 3507C—she said that she had noticed that the colour green was heavily oversaturated in the media and fashion, and added: "I wanted to go with an offensive, off-trend shade of green to trigger the idea of something being wrong. I'd like for us to question our expectations of pop culture—why are some things considered good and acceptable, and some things deemed bad? I'm interested in the narratives behind that and I want to provoke people. I'm not doing things to be nice". Kristin Robinson of Billboard claimed that Charli XCX had been "inspired by a 1990s neon rave flyer and the title credits to Gregg Araki's 2007 comedy, Smiley Face".

Despite its simple appearance, the album cover's design underwent a five-month development process, maintaining a green square with text. Designer Brent David Freaney selected the colour after examining around 500 shades, aiming for an off-putting, garish effect. The final shade resonated with Charli XCX's vision of bold irreverence. The typography, based on Arial, was chosen for its non-"precious" feel. While considering various Swiss typefaces, Freaney wanted to surpass Helvetica. The text, slightly stretched to "give it a personality", is awkwardly placed to be neither small and tasteful nor large and loud, creating an opinion-less aesthetic.

In the weeks leading up to Brat's release, a wall in Greenpoint, Brooklyn—which fans called the "brat wall"—was painted and repainted with the album's signature green colour and various messages. Over the summer, its messages changed frequently in line with the album's promotion cycle. The first message was "i'm your fav reference"—a lyric from the single "360"—before it was repainted to read simply "brat". On 10 June, when Brat's deluxe edition was released, the wall was changed to white with the message "brat and it's the same but there's three more songs so it's not". By the middle of June, the wall remained white but changed its message to "lorde", indicating Lorde's possible involvement with future releases pertaining to Brat, which soon appeared in the remix version of "Girl, So Confusing". The final message of the Brat wall—"ok bye!" in the album's signature green—was painted on 1 July.

During her performance at Coachella 2025 in April 2025, Charli XCX projected a new version of the cover on screen with scribbles on the letters, which would be shown on streaming services and later modified with brown, metallic rust the next month. It has been linked to a possible announcement of the end to the Brat era. On the album's first anniversary on 7 June 2025, the cover was once again changed similar to the original cover, only with the text reading "forever <3". On 30 June, the cover was changed back to the original version.

Timeline of Brat's covers on streaming services

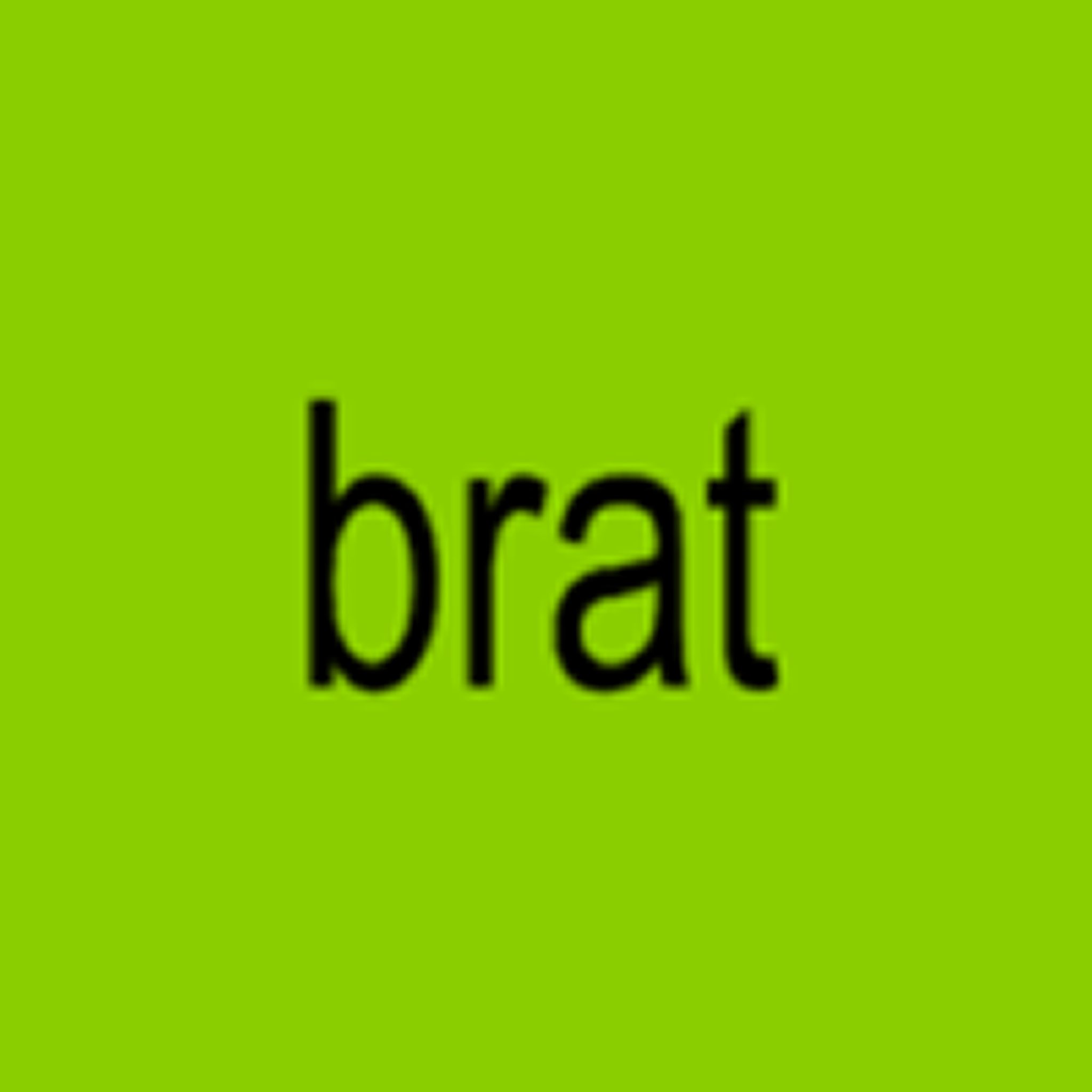
June 2024 – April 2025

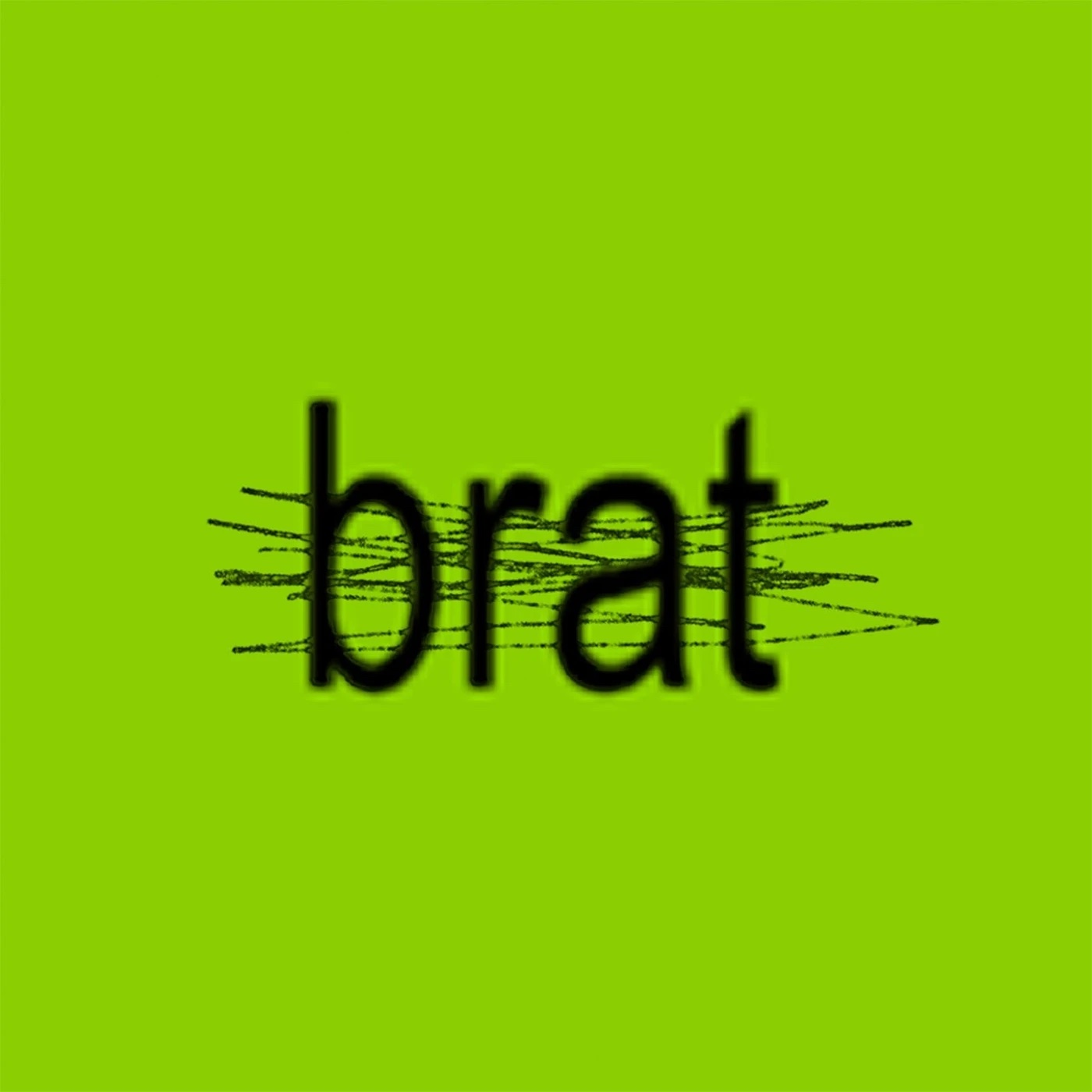
April 2025

May 2025

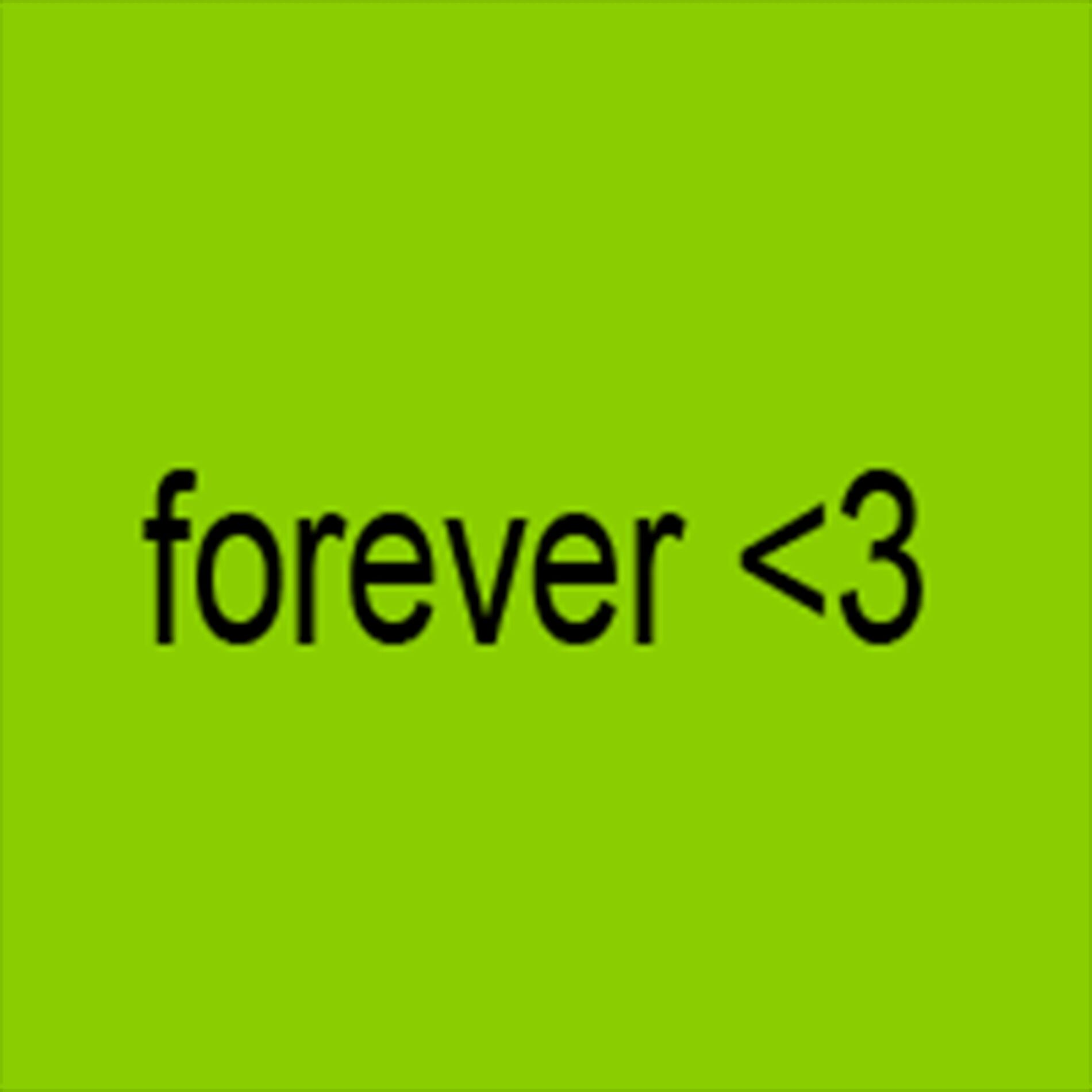
June 2025

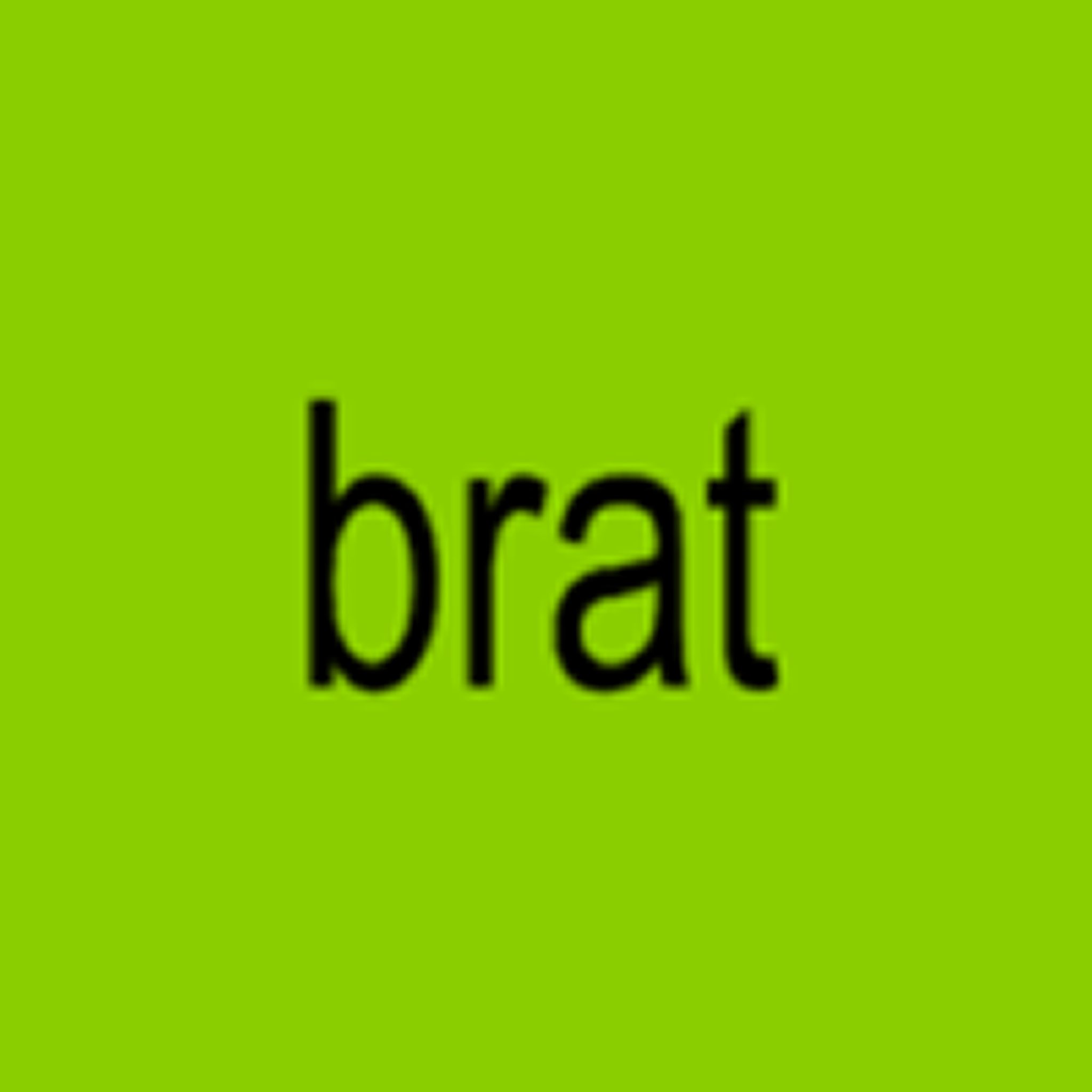
June 2025 – present

== Critical reception ==
Professional ratings
Aggregate scores
Source	Rating
AnyDecentMusic?	8.7/10
Metacritic	95/100
Review scores
Source	Rating
AllMusic	4.5/5 stars
Exclaim!	9/10
The Guardian	5/5 stars
The Independent	4/5 stars
The Line of Best Fit	9/10
NME	4/5 stars
Paste	9.0/10
Pitchfork	8.6/10
Rolling Stone	4/5 stars
Slant Magazine	4/5 stars

Brat was met with widespread critical acclaim. According to the review aggregator Metacritic, Brat received "universal acclaim" based on a weighted average score of 95 out of 100 from 25 critic scores. The website's report reads, "Critics have embraced the album's rave-influenced sound that eliminates some of the accessibility (and guest stars) of prior album Crash in favor of a rawer, grittier, and more sophisticated sound that is no less fun. Club classic, indeed".

Critics praised Charli XCX's emotional vulnerability and several declared Brat to be one of her best albums, with Laura Snapes of The Guardian calling it a masterpiece. Sal Cinquemani of Slant Magazine described the album as "bratty and brash" but "frequently vulnerable". Brittany Spanos of Rolling Stone wrote that Brat was a "hyperpop rollercoaster of post-Saturn return, early-thirties anxieties, and It-girl bravado". Ben Tipple from DIY saw the album as a manifestation of Charli XCX's rave roots, dubbing it "an unmistakable representation of her very core; an exhilarating ode to the multiple facets of club culture".

Meaghan Garvey of Pitchfork lauded the album as "substantial in new ways for Charli" and gave it the distinction of Best New Music. Pitchfork also recognised "Von Dutch" and the "Girl, So Confusing" remix as Best New Tracks upon their respective releases. Writing for Paste, Eric Bennett praised the album and described it as "messy and vulnerable—in a way Charli's work has lacked over the last decade". Bojana Jovanović of Vogue Adria characterised the album as "complex, quality and made smartly enough for people to search for a deeper meaning in it. Is this the most contemporary and the most complete pop album at the moment? Charli XCX certainly made an album that left a strong impression on many, and based on the critical reception, it will certainly leave a mark in the history of music". PopMatters said "Brat is next-level Charli XCX, a miracle and an instant classic."

Brat was the most awarded album on 2024 year-end rankings by critics, with at least 22 declaring Brat the number-one best, including Jon Pareles and those for Billboard, Entertainment Weekly, The Guardian, NME, and Rolling Stone, among others.

== Accolades ==
Awards and nominations for Brat
Award	Year	Category	Result	Ref.
Mercury Prize	2024	Album of the Year	Nominated	
ARIA Music Awards	2024	Best International Artist	Nominated	
Danish Music Awards	2024	International Album of the Year	Won	
Billboard Music Awards	2024	Top Dance/Electronic Album	Won	
Grammy Awards	2025	Album of the Year	Nominated	
Grammy Awards	2025	Best Dance/Electronic Album	Won	
Grammy Awards	2025	Best Recording Package	Won	
Brit Awards	2025	British Album of the Year	Won	
Ivor Novello Awards	2025	Best Album	Nominated	
American Music Awards	2025	Album of the Year	Nominated	
American Music Awards	2025	Favorite Pop Album	Nominated	
CD Shop Awards	2025	Western Music Award	Won	

Decade's-best listings for Brat
Publication	List	Rank	Ref.
Paste	The 100 Best Albums of the 2020s So Far (2024)	15	
Pitchfork	The 100 Best Albums of the 2020s So Far (2024)	7	
Rolling Stone	The 250 Greatest Albums of the 21st Century So Far	35	

== Commercial performance ==
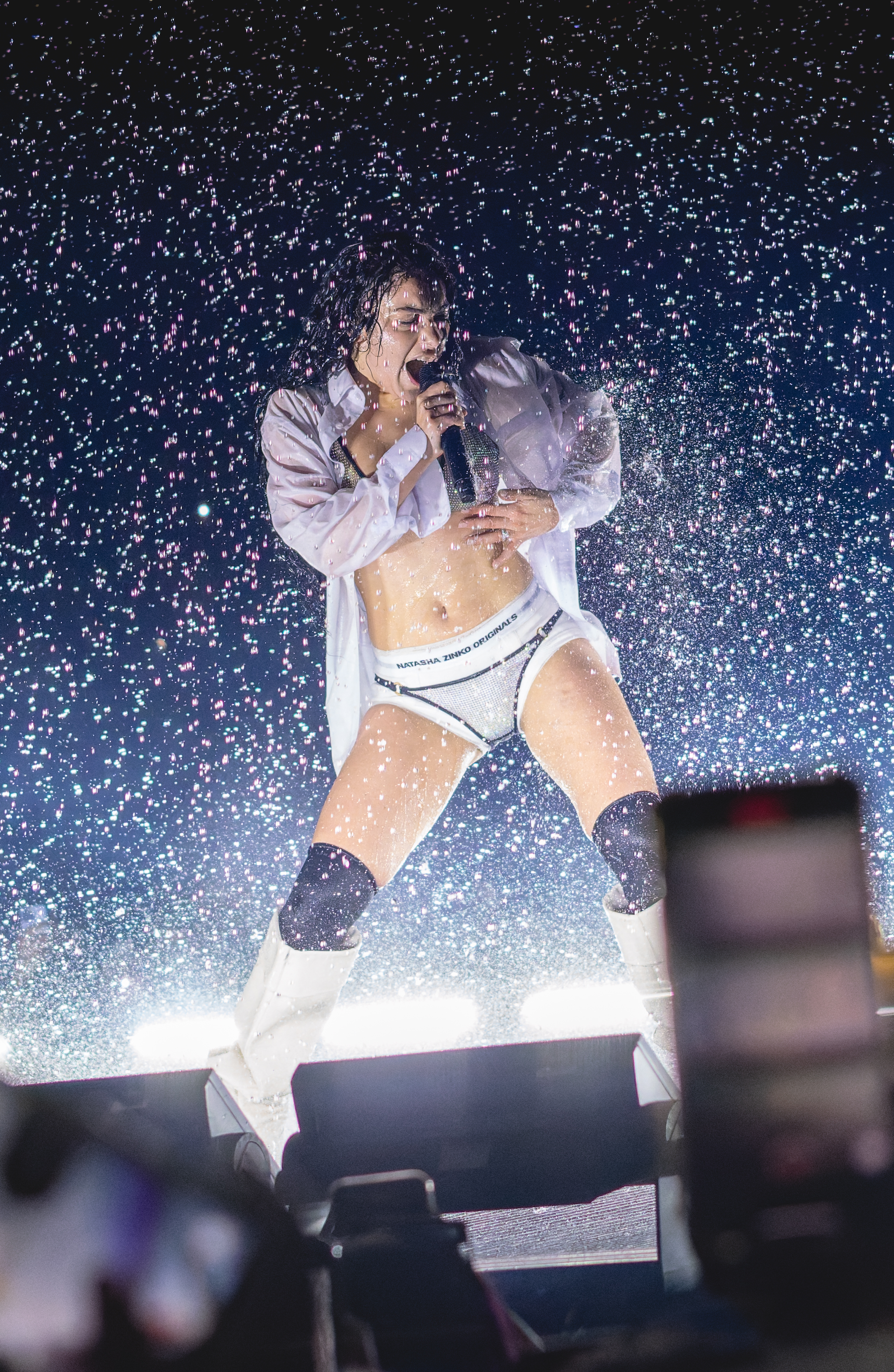
Charli XCX performing on the Brat Tour in Birmingham, 2024

In the United Kingdom, Brat debuted at number two (selling 27,234 units) on the UK Albums Chart, earning Charli XCX her second top ten charting album and her biggest opening week sales in the country. This sparked discussion among media outlets who noted Taylor Swift appeared to be forcing her most recent album, The Tortured Poets Department, to remain in the number one position by releasing a new, UK-only variant of the album in the same week that Brat was released. As of February 2025, Brat has sold over 300,000 units in the country earning it a platinum certification. After releasing the remix album Brat and It's Completely Different but Also Still Brat, the album reached the top of the charts in UK, marking Charli XCX's second number one album in the UK after Crash (2022). In Australia, Brat debuted at number three on the ARIA Charts. It peaked at number one following the release of Brat and It's Completely Different but Also Still Brat, becoming her second consecutive number one album on the chart after Crash.

In the US, Brat debuted at number three on the Billboard 200 with 77,000 album-equivalent units sold on its opening week, consisting of 40,000 pure album sales. With this feat, it became Charli XCX's highest-charting album in the country. It also earned Charli XCX her highest first week overall sales and her biggest streaming week ever with 46.72 million streams. Following the release of the remix album Brat and It's Completely Different but Also Still Brat, the album later returned to its number three peak on its nineteenth week, selling a further 105,000 equivalent units with 57,000 pure album sales, earning the album its biggest sales week on the chart. The album also peaked at number one on the Dance/Electronic Albums chart, becoming her second top-ten record project on the chart after Vroom Vroom (2016), while all of its tracks charted on the Hot Dance/Electronic Songs.

== Cultural Impact ==
=== Subversive branding ===
People's Sadie Bell linked the album cover with the nature of the album, which Charli XCX called "confrontational". Dubbed the "Brat summer" trend, the style of album cover and the specific shade of green became a viral sensation after a "Brat generator" tool surfaced online that allowed users to replicate the cover with their own custom text. The London Eye landmark was lit up in lime green on the day of the album's release. National Geographic acknowledged the album and the "brat girl" persona in a Brat-themed article discussing rebellious female icons throughout history, including Cleopatra, Wu Zetian, Lucrezia Borgia, Georgiana Cavendish, and George Sand.

=== Lexicographical recognition ===
On 31 October 2024, "brat" was named the word of the year by the Collins English Dictionary, and on 11 December, Forbes named the "Brat summer" as one of the biggest pop culture moments in 2024. Despite having previously teased the end of the Brat era (see § Artwork and marketing), Charli XCX told Vanity Fair's Anna Peele in October 2025 that she doesn't "really get to decide when it's over or not. I think that's up to the world. It will eventually exist as a relic. I don't think people will forget it. On the other hand, it's not fucking New Wave."

=== Use in political endorsements ===
Charli
(@charli_xcx)
tweeted:

kamala IS brat

22 July 2024

As part of their 2024 United Kingdom general election campaign, the Green Party of England and Wales posted a replica of the album cover to social media that read "vote green" instead of "brat". Mayor of London Sadiq Khan received a mixed response when replicating the cover on his Instagram to promote the success of the Ultra Low Emission Zone scheme.

After Joe Biden decided to withdraw from the 2024 U.S. presidential election, the official Biden-Harris campaign profile renamed itself "Kamala HQ" and changed its banner picture in imitation of the album cover, replacing "brat" with "kamala hq". This occurred after Charli XCX tweeted about Harris on X (formerly Twitter), saying "kamala IS brat". Charli XCX later stated that although not meant as an explicit endorsement, she was "happy to help prevent democracy from failing forever". Multiple TikTok videos have shown edits of songs from the album with footage of Harris in the background. Some analysts suggested the connection between the campaign and album would create enthusiasm among young voters. On Real Time with Bill Maher in October, Van Jones made reference to the album in a negative assessment of Harris' campaign, stating it had gone from "brat to flat".

== Track listing ==
Brat – standard edition track listing
No.	Title	Writer(s)	Producer(s)	Length
1.	"360"	Charlotte Aitchison; Alexander Guy Cook; Henry Walter; Finn Keane; Omer Fedi; Blake Slatkin	Cirkut; A. G. Cook; Keane^{[a]}	2:13
2.	"Club Classics"	Aitchison; George Daniel	Daniel; Cook^{[a]}	2:33
3.	"Sympathy Is a Knife"	Aitchison; Keane; Jonathan Christopher Shave	Keane; Charli XCX	2:31
4.	"I Might Say Something Stupid"	Aitchison; Mike Lévy	Gesaffelstein; Bart Schoudel^{[v]}	1:49
5.	"Talk Talk"	Aitchison; Cook; Ross Matthew Birchard	Hudson Mohawke; Cook^{[a]}	2:41
6.	"Von Dutch"	Aitchison; Keane	Keane	2:44
7.	"Everything Is Romantic"	Aitchison; Pablo Díaz-Reixa	El Guincho; Cook; XCX; Jasper Harris^{[a]}; Marlonwiththeglasses^{[a]}; Jae Deal^{[a]}	3:23
8.	"Rewind"	Aitchison; Walter; Cook	Cirkut; Cook	2:48
9.	"So I"	Aitchison; Keane; Shave	Shave; Cook	3:31
10.	"Girl, So Confusing"	Aitchison; Cook	Cook	2:54
11.	"Apple"	Aitchison; Daniel; Linus Wiklund; Noonie Bao	Daniel; Wiklund; Cook; XCX	2:31
12.	"B2B"	Aitchison; Lévy	Gesaffelstein; Fedi; Cook; Schoudel^{[v]}	2:58
13.	"Mean Girls"	Aitchison; Cook; Birchard	Cook; Hudson Mohawke	3:09
14.	"I Think About It All the Time"	Aitchison; Cook; Keane; Shave	Cook; Keane	2:15
15.	"365"	Aitchison; Cook; Walter	Cook; Cirkut	3:23
Total length:				41:23

Brat and It's the Same but There's Three More Songs So It's Not – deluxe edition track listing
No.	Title	Writer(s)	Producer(s)	Length
16.	"Hello Goodbye"	Aitchison; Cook	Cook	3:39
17.	"Guess"	Aitchison; Harrison Patrick Smith; Dylan Brady	The Dare	2:22
18.	"Spring Breakers"	Aitchison; Cook; Keane; Shave	Cook; Keane; Shave	2:23
Total length:				49:46

Brat – Japanese physical edition track listing
No.	Title	Writer(s)	Producer(s)	Length
16.	"Talk Talk" (featuring Troye Sivan)	Aitchison; Cook; Birchard; Troye Mellet; Brett McLaughlin; Kaelyn Behr; Kevin Hickey; Adam Novodor	Cook; Zhone; Novodor; Styalz Fuego	2:53
Total length:				44:16

Notes

- All tracks are stylised in sentence case.
- ^{^[a]} signifies an additional producer.
- ^{^[v]} signifies a vocal producer.
- "Talk Talk" (featuring Troye Sivan) features uncredited additional vocals from Dua Lipa.

Samples and interpolations

- "360" contains an uncredited interpolation of "1, 2 Step" (2004), written by Ciara Harris, Melissa Elliott and Phalon Alexander, and performed by Ciara.
- "Spring Breakers" contains an interpolation of "Everytime" (2003), written by Britney Spears and Annet Artani, and performed by Spears.

== Personnel ==
- Charli XCX – vocals, executive production, design, layout
- Randy Merrill – mastering
- Idania Valencia – mastering (tracks 1–5, 7–18)
- Manny Marroquin – mixing (tracks 1, 8)
- Tom Norris – mixing (tracks 2, 3, 5, 6, 10, 13)
- Bart Schoudel – mixing, vocal engineering (tracks 4, 12)
- Gesaffelstein – mixing (tracks 4, 12)
- Geoff Swan – mixing (tracks 7, 9, 11, 14–18)
- Cirkut – vocal engineering (tracks 1, 8)
- George Daniel – vocal engineering (tracks 2, 11)
- Jon Shave – vocal engineering (tracks 3, 9)
- Finn Keane – vocal engineering (tracks 3, 14)
- A. G. Cook – vocal engineering (tracks 5, 7, 10, 13, 14, 16), executive production
- Ashley Jacobson – vocal recording (track 6)
- Hudson Mohawke – vocal engineering (track 13)
- Matt Cahill – mixing assistance (tracks 7, 9, 11, 14–18)
- Darin Lewis – promotion, listener, approvals
- Special Offer – design, layout
- Imogene Strauss – design, layout

== Charts ==
=== Weekly charts ===
Weekly chart performance for Brat
Chart (2024)	Peak position
Australian Albums (ARIA)	1
Australian Dance Albums (ARIA)	1
Austrian Albums (Ö3 Austria)	5
Belgian Albums (Ultratop Flanders)	3
Belgian Albums (Ultratop Wallonia)	6
Canadian Albums (Billboard)	2
Croatian International Albums (HDU)	1
Danish Albums (Hitlisten)	9
Dutch Albums (Album Top 100)	4
Finnish Albums (Suomen virallinen lista)	11
French Albums (SNEP)	15
German Albums (Offizielle Top 100)	5
Greek Albums (IFPI)	26
Hungarian Albums (MAHASZ)	11
Icelandic Albums (Tónlistinn)	8
Irish Albums (Official Charts)	1
Italian Albums (FIMI)	15
Japanese Download Albums (Billboard Japan)	50
Japanese Top Albums Sales (Billboard Japan)	42
Lithuanian Albums (AGATA)	7
New Zealand Albums (RMNZ)	1
Norwegian Albums (VG-lista)	9
Polish Albums (ZPAV)	10
Portuguese Albums (AFP)	5
Scottish Albums (Official Charts)	2
Spanish Albums (Promusicae)	2
Swedish Albums (Sverigetopplistan)	12
Swiss Albums (Schweizer Hitparade)	7
UK Albums (Official Charts)	1
UK Dance Albums (Official Charts)	1
US Billboard 200	3
US Top Dance Albums (Billboard)	1

=== Year-end charts ===
Year-end chart performance for Brat
Chart (2024)	Position
Australian Albums (ARIA)	18
Australian Dance Albums (ARIA)	1
Austrian Albums (Ö3 Austria)	43
Belgian Albums (Ultratop Flanders)	36
Belgian Albums (Ultratop Wallonia)	151
Canadian Albums (Billboard)	57
Croatian International Albums (HDU)	7
Danish Albums (Hitlisten)	75
Dutch Albums (Album Top 100)	41
French Albums (SNEP)	101
German Albums (Offizielle Top 100)	72
Hungarian Albums (MAHASZ)	76
Icelandic Albums (Tónlistinn)	93
New Zealand Albums (RMNZ)	18
Polish Albums (ZPAV)	91
Swiss Albums (Schweizer Hitparade)	59
UK Albums (Official Charts)	8
US Billboard 200	65
US Top Dance Albums (Billboard)	1

Chart (2025)	Position
Australian Albums (ARIA)	13
Austrian Albums (Ö3 Austria)	34
Belgian Albums (Ultratop Flanders)	35
Belgian Albums (Ultratop Wallonia)	113
Canadian Albums (Billboard)	38
Croatian International Albums (HDU)	20
Danish Albums (Hitlisten)	80
Dutch Albums (Album Top 100)	50
French Albums (SNEP)	83
German Albums (Offizielle Top 100)	79
Hungarian Albums (MAHASZ)	35
New Zealand Albums (RMNZ)	14
Polish Albums (ZPAV)	85
Spanish Albums (PROMUSICAE)	59
Swiss Albums (Schweizer Hitparade)	65
UK Albums (Official Charts)	18
US Billboard 200	24
US Top Dance Albums (Billboard)	1

== Certifications ==
Certifications for Brat
Region	Certification	Certified units/sales
Australia (ARIA)	Gold	35,000^{‡}
Austria (IFPI Austria)	Gold	7,500^{‡}
Canada (Music Canada)	2× Platinum	160,000^{‡}
France (SNEP)	Platinum	100,000^{‡}
Germany (BVMI)	Gold	75,000^{‡}
Italy (FIMI)	Gold	25,000^{‡}
New Zealand (RMNZ)	2× Platinum	30,000^{‡}
Poland (ZPAV)	Gold	10,000^{‡}
Portugal (AFP)	Platinum	7,000^{‡}
Spain (Promusicae)	Platinum	40,000^{‡}
United Kingdom (BPI)	2× Platinum	600,000^{‡}
^{‡} Sales+streaming figures based on certification alone.
