= Richard Turley (graphic designer) =

English graphic designer

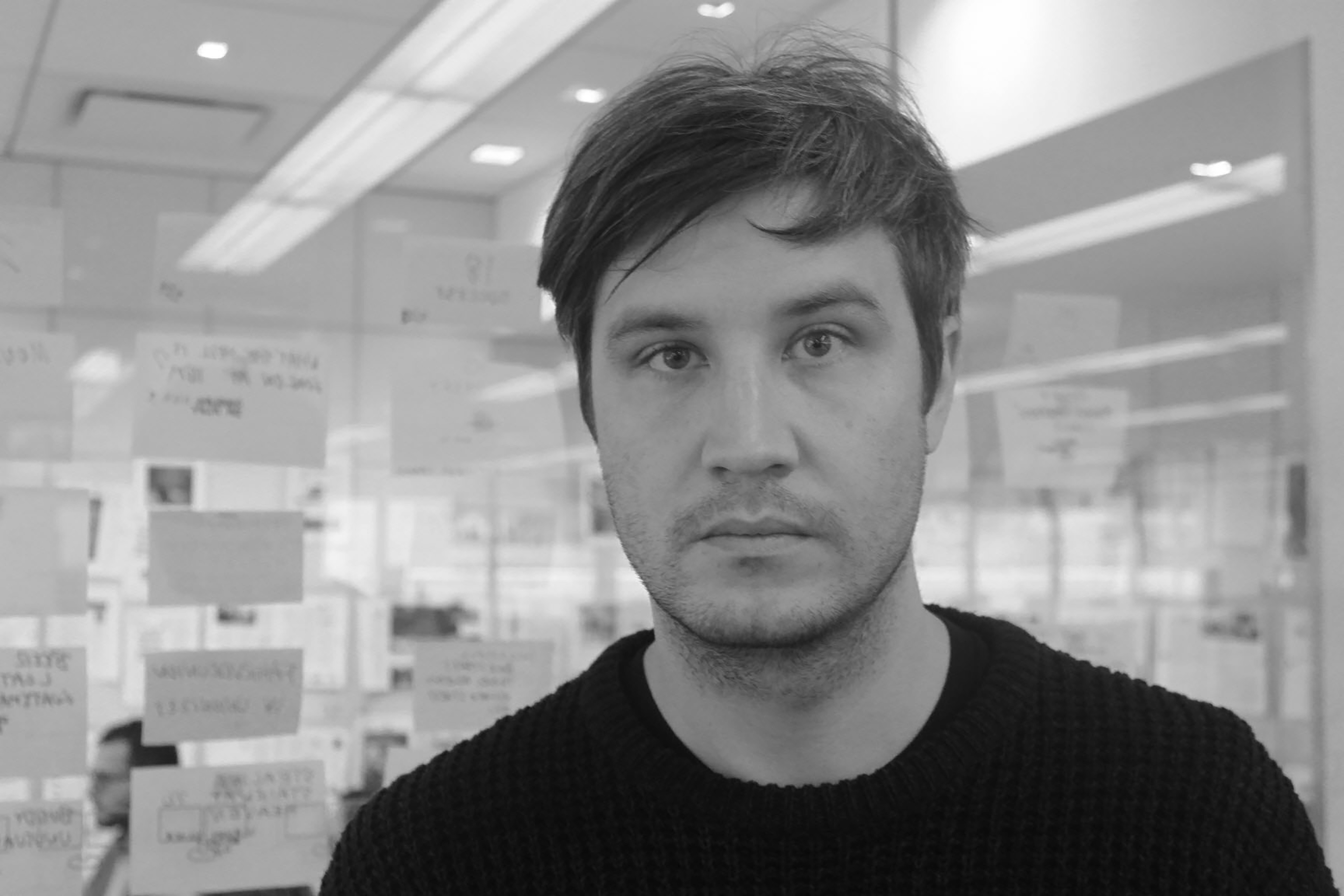
- Turley in 2022
- Education: Liverpool School of Art and Design
- Known for: Graphic designer and art director
- Notable work: MTV; Bloomberg Businessweek; Civilization; Interview; G2; Food

Richard Turley is an English creative director and graphic designer. He is the creative director of Life and the co-founder of Civilization magazine. Turley became well known for his work redesigning the visual strategies of Bloomberg Businessweek, MTV, and Interview.

== Early life and education ==
Turley attended the Liverpool School of Art and Design where he graduated with a Bachelor of Arts. While at the University of Liverpool, he designed the university's student paper Shout. He is a member of Alliance Graphique Internationale.

== Career ==
Turley worked at the marketing department of London-based newspaper The Guardian before moving to the creative department. Between 2003 and 2005, he worked with creative director Mark Porter as senior designer during a major redesign of The Guardian. He later served as the art director of G2, The Guardian's magazine with editors Kath Viner and Ian Katz.

=== Bloomberg Businessweek: 2010–2014 ===
Cover of "The Hedge Fund Myth", in Bloomberg Businessweek

In 2011, Turley was appointed as the creative designer of Bloomberg Businessweek. During his tenure, Turley completely redesigned Businessweek, in favor of a more avant-garde style than the publication had previously been known for. Turley and editor Josh Tyrangiel began to develop an experimental visual aesthetic for the magazine, that looked like "it had been assembled from PowerPoint clip art by some sales manager on a cocaine bender." The redesign drew attention for its provocative style and visual appeal. Designer George Lois described the redesigned look as "the best consistent set of covers in 40 years."

Many of Turley's covers drew attention for their provocative and controversial designs. A story on the UAL/Continental Airlines merger drew controversy for Turley's cover depicting two airplanes having sex. Turley's cover of a Businessweek article titled "The Hedge Fund Myth" drew controversy for its phallic imagery illustrating the divide between expectations and reality in hedge fund returns. Alexander Nazaryan of The Atlantic questioned whether the hedge fund cover and others like it ran the risk of overshadowing the reporting they illustrated. Bloomberg published an article explaining the design process of "The Hedge Fund Myth"'s cover.

Turley was named the Hottest Creative Player in the 2011 Adweek Hotlist. He was ranked #46 on The Verge 50 list in 2013. In 2014, The Atlantic published a tribute to Turley's work, showcasing some of his best Businessweek covers.

Turley was commissioned to design the cover of the 2013 edition of American Illustration's annual magazine.

=== MTV, Wieden+Kennedy: 2014–2017 ===
In 2014, Turley left Businessweek to serve as MTV's first senior vice president of visual storytelling and deputy editorial director. In 2015, Turley created "MTV No Chill", a multi-platform project which ran on the channel between 6-8pm. As part of No Chill, MTV content was edited and remixed with short form videos, sketches and graphics. Turley developed an experimental approach to producing content for MTV that incorporated social media and internet culture. The resulting look was described by some as "being eyefucked by bullshit."

Turley became the executive creative director of content and editorial design at Wieden+Kennedy in 2016. Turley launched the WKTV channel in 2017. While at Wieden+Kennedy, Turley led a redesign of Formula One's logo and branding. The redesign included the creation of new typefaces, and a new logo which replaced one adopted in 1994. Turley cited Franco Grignani and The Designers Republic as creative influences on the redesign, which was inspired by the aesthetics of the videogame Wipeout. Manufacturing company 3M claimed that the redesigned F1 logo bore similarities to the logo for its Futuro sock brand, and may have infringed on its copyright. Formula One agreed to not use the logo on therapeutic or orthopedic products so as to avoid confusion with Futuro, and 3M withdrew their opposition to the trademark.

Turley designed a special edition of ‘’'SUP Magazine’’ in 2015. He designed covers and parody ads for Esquire's special edition of the political satire magazine Spy. The issue, which ran during the 2016 US Presidential Election, lampooned political events and figures such as Donald Trump, as well as Hillary and Bill Clinton.

Turley designed a special magazine section for culture magazine 032c. The section dealt with the impact that the alt-right's distortion of facts had on absurdity and reality in discourse, stating that it had given people a license to become "Nonsense Warriors". In early 2017, Turley designed a cover for Darcie Wilder's literally show me a healthy person. The mock-up enraged publisher Giancarlo DiTrapano, and the cover was never used. He also worked on other publications, such as Mushpit and Good Trouble in 2017.

=== Interview, Civilization magazine: 2018-2020 ===
Turley became the editorial director of Interview magazine when it was relaunched in 2018, taking over from Fabien Baron. He works with creative director Mel Ottenberg.

Turley co-founded Civilization magazine with Mia Kerin and Lucas Mascatello in 2018. Turley had previously worked with Mascatello at MTV, and approached him with the idea of starting their own newspaper. The magazine was inspired by the decline of print media, and. Civilization is a print-only broadsheet which focuses on life and culture in New York. Fashion designer Junya Watanabe collaborated with Turley to use content and imagery from Civilization on Watanabe's Spring 2020 Collection.

The publication has developed a cult following due to its personalized, unorthodox style. Dazed described the magazine as a "anarchic countercultural diary." Civilization launched a personalized mail art campaign during the 2020 COVID-19 lockdowns as a way to reach out to New York residents. Civilization also produces Civilization Radio, a segment on Montez Press Radio.

The sixth issue of Civilization—released in May 2022—garnered attention because most of its contents were generated through artificial intelligence (AI), featuring computer-generated texts that have been described as spanning "hate lists, girl texts, break-up DMs, Butt2butt, emotional affairs and Fentanyl Strips." Writing for Dazed, Günseli Yalcinkaya felt that the edition "perfectly conveys the feeling of being terminally online", and regarded it as a "glorious brain dump of images and information; an aggressively text-based assault on the senses in the shape of a Dadaist broadsheet." Turley said the issue was an attempt to "make something horrible, based, repellent", and cited Lou Reed's 1975 album Metal Machine Music as an inspiration. In an interview, he explained the theme behind the issue's chaotic structure:

Playing with the idea of words as images and trying to blend it together so you can start or finish at any point without taking any specific message from any of it. Forgetting all ideas that words have to mean something. Like playing a record at the wrong speed. Like that feeling of watching a video backwards. Just sensation. [...] It‘s an issue about feeling something, then nothing. It‘s about feeling something, then feeling it again, then nothing. Feeling something like a lot of people all at once. A crowd. A crowd with no clear identity, no clear message. It‘s about being unsure if the message that‘s being sent is the same one you‘re receiving.

Turley was included in Jens Müller's The History of Graphic Design. Vol. 2: 1960–Today (2018). He designed the 57th Annual Design and Art Direction collection in 2019. That year, he designed the ad campaign for Rhizome's 7x7 conference at the New Museum. He described the campaign, which made use of analogue advertising methods like brochures, posters and artwork, as "an exploded magazine".

In 2019, Turley designed a window campaign for retailer Barneys New York while it was filing for Chapter 11 bankruptcy. The campaign was noted for its unorthodox approach of frankly relating the store's financial difficulties. The campaign featured window designs with tongue-in-cheek slogans such as "NOT CLOSED" and "THE EMPEROR HAS CLOTHES". Turley stated that he wanted "to encourage them to be a little bit more vulnerable and out front."

Turley designed the branding of Good Buys, a non-profit fashion fundraiser, in 2020.

=== 2022-present ===
In 2022, the designer founded the creative agency Food with Nick Farnhill and Iain Tait; with offices in London and New York City. Turley described Food as a response against a years-old trend in the creative industry that he identified as "duplicative" and "formulaic", driven by a management focus on brand strategy over the creative process, resulting in works that are largely reworkings of other designs. Food's first production was the zine Softie for British fashion brand Mulberry, released on the occasion of the opening of its Wooster Street flagship store in New York City.

In 2023, Turley launched Nuts, described as an "anti-fashion magazine" by Vogue. Nuts is published through Food, and was inspired by Turley and Tait's work with fashion brands. The magazine is published in a black-and-white, pulp format with issues running several hundred pages in length.

In 2024, Turley and Julia Schäfer designed the zine Offal using Microsoft Word, as part of the Offal art project. Turley described the decision to use Word as "a good example of kind of cutting off your nose to spite your face or, tie one hand behind your back, because if you can’t use the tools in the way that they need to be used or that they’re requiring to be used, then you’ve at least got a better chance of there being a different outcome at the other end. It's Nice That described the final product as a "jarring" collection "[served] up in a terrine-like form for our consumption."

Turley has also designed the alt-literature magazine Heavy Traffic.

== Style and influences ==
Turley's design style is characterized by bold typography and irreverent designs, as well as his characteristic disregard for grid design. His work has been described as provocative, often incorporating risky or subversive imagery. Turley said that his work is "really...about making myself laugh [...] I’d hope that there’s a bit of naughtiness and cheekiness. I like work that just feels a bit wrong."

Many of Turley's designs incorporate and remix pop cultural memes and internet culture. He described his process of recontextualizing and reusing media as "appropriation culture." In an interview with Oliviero Toscani, Turley said "we’re living in this sort of mood board dress-up culture where bunches of coded references are yoked together—the 'creativity' coming from the uniqueness of those references, or the inventiveness with which they’re combined."

Turley has cited designers like Tibor Kalman, East Village Other, and Oz. His work has also been influenced by alternative and underground publications and zines of the 1960s and 1970s.

== Awards ==
Turley has been awarded thirty five D&AD awards, and 4 Yellow Pencil awards from D&AD. He has won eight awards for Creative Design from the Type Directors Club. He has also earned several awards from the Art Directors Club of New York.

Businessweek won several awards for design under Turley. He received a Creative Review "Studio of the Year" award in 2012 for his work in the magazine's art department. That year, the publication won the Gold Award for "Magazine of the Year" from the Society of Publication Designers. It was also named Magpile's "Magazine of the Year" in 2013.

== Exhibitions ==
Turley's work has been shown in exhibitions including the 2012 "Designs of the Year" show at the Design Museum in London and "Graphic Design Now" at the Walker Art Center, Minneapolis. In 2019 Turley's work was featured alongside Jimmy Turrell's work at the "Unforsaken" exhibition at The Book Club in Shoreditch.

== Speaking engagements ==
Turley has given talks at AIGA Pittsburgh, the Walker Art Center's "Insight Design Lecture", RGD Ontario's "DesignThinkers" conference, Offset Festival, ModMag New York edition, and QVED's conference in Munich. He was featured on Gestalten.tv and It's Nice That's "Nicer Tuesdays" talks.
