= Civilization (magazine) =

Broadsheet magazine based in New York

- Issue #1, Volume #1, cover dated April 2018
- Founder: Richard Turley
- First issue: 2018
- Country: United States
- Based in: New York City
- Website: www.civilizationnyc.com

Civilization is a broadsheet magazine founded by Richard Turley in 2018. The magazine covers life and culture in New York City and is known for its chaotic, anachronistic, print-focused design. It has developed a cult following.

== History ==
=== Founding and format ===
The magazine was created by Richard Turley, Mia Kerin and Lucas Mascatello in 2018. It was inspired by the decline of print newspapers and magazines in favor of more transient and immaterial digital media. Turley felt that many surviving publications had shifted their focus away from New York to broader topics, creating a lack of publications that actually focused on city life. In an interview with Print, the editors stated that they created the magazine out of the belief that "[print] is a form that can still hold us in its grip and just because the current selection of magazines is so meager in its ambition, that we should remind ourselves what magazines can do. How they can make us feel."

The 16-page magazine is designed around a broadsheet newspaper format with large, bold text and images as a way of contrasting the small text of phone screens and digital displays. Pages are interspersed with text collages, cartoons, feature boxes, and abstract lists. Each issue's content is based around loosely connected concepts and aesthetics, rather than the structure of more typical, journalistic publications. Issues include question-and-answer style interviews and other abstract pieces about life in New York City. It is inspired by the disordered and unpredictable nature of social media, and the chaos of the city.

The editors originally considered several possible names for the magazine, including "Bored," "Motherfucker", and "Fame Whores of Hedge Fund City". They eventually chose the title Civilization, because of its "grandeur" and "pomposity", it provides a satirical contrast to the magazine's topics, which "focus often on the ephemera of life and the more extreme, depraved areas of the city and our society." It is intended to have a casual, naturalistic and occasionally lurid tone similar to podcasts and chatrooms.

The artwork for the first issue was made by Kurt Woerpel and the logo was designed by Paul Barnes. The mascot for the publication wears a pair of Converse sneakers and has been alternately described as a "moody [...] daemon" and "a squishy, cartoon putti".

=== Publishing history ===
The publication's first issue was published in April 2018, and the second issue was released later that year. The third issue was published in September 2019, followed by the fourth issue in 2020, and the fifth issue in March 2021.

The publication also sells custom t-shirts with segments of the magazine printed on them. Content and imagery from Civilization was used by fashion designer Junya Watanabe for his Spring 2020 Collection.

Civilization launched a personalized mail art campaign in response to the 2020 COVID-19 lockdowns, as the editors felt that mailing letters was a more interactive and tactile medium. The campaign was inspired by correspondence artist Ray Johnson, who pioneered the use of mail and postcards as an artistic medium. Alex Needham of The Guardian wrote that unlike the magazine, the letter campaign "no longer expresses a cacophony, but intimacy, one person trying to reach another across the divide."

The sixth issue of Civilization was released in May 2022, and was based around the concept of "unlikable, repellent, horrible, ugly" and "unswerving negativity". The issue had a deliberately crowded and fragmented aesthetic, and over half of the issue was AI-generated. Turley explained this decision as a way to include the "collective consciousness" represented by artificial intelligence, which is trained on a multitude of people's fears and insecurities.

Civilization produces Civilization Radio, a bi-monthly radio segment on NTS Radio.

== Reception ==
The magazine has developed a cult following and been well received by critics. In an article for GQ, Rachel Tasjihan suggested that some of the magazine's appeal stemmed from its physicality and niche circulation. Benjamin Hart of Intelligencer praised the magazine's anachronistic design and diverse content that "includes everything from a digressive diary by internet darling Darcie Wilder to a pictorial chronicle of a house party to a history of the radical left-wing group Weather Underground’s accidental 1970 bomb explosion in Greenwich Village."

Writing for Dazed, Thomas Gorton described the debut issue as "a scattershot yet all-encompassing approach to capturing the intensity of life in New York, a brutal, beautiful brain dump that draws you into its pages." Ruby Boddington of It's Nice That wrote that the first issue's busy design forces readers' eyes to move around the page to process its ideas.

A review of the fifth issue in Magculture by Jeremy Leslie praised its absurdist tone, high word count, and design, which culminates in a "centrefold cosmic imagining of New York in 2021. Multiple reference points and diversions pull the reader through a quasi-religious mapping of the internal and external experience of being a New Yorker today."

Günseli Yalcinkaya of Dazed commented that the sixth issue "evokes the same sensation as falling deep into a web wormhole".
