= Rina Sawayama discography =

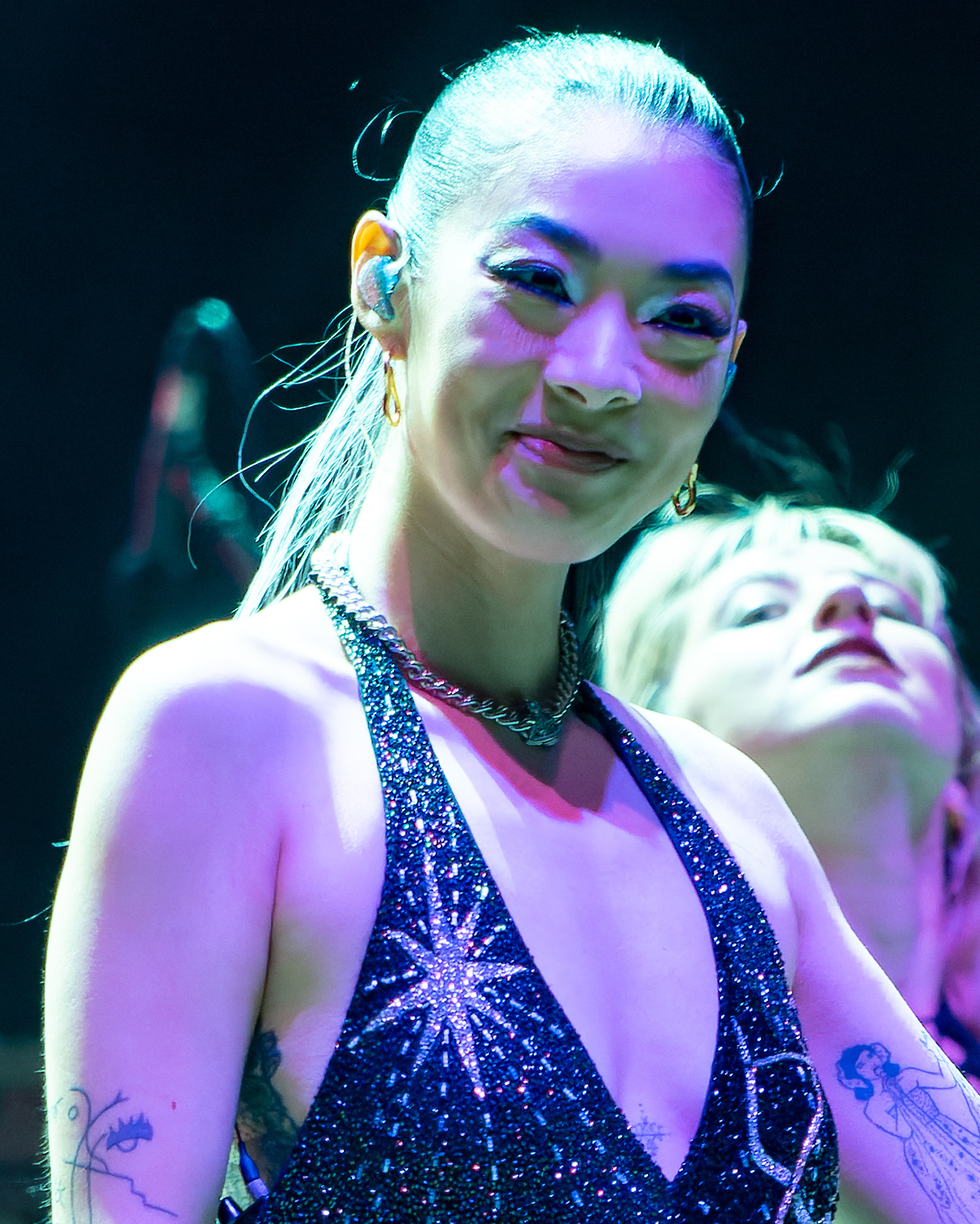
- Sawayama performing at Primavera Sound in 2022
- Studio albums: 2
- EPs: 1
- Live albums: 1 (Note: The live album Live at the Roundhouse was exclusively released as a bonus CD when purchasing select copies of Hold the Girl from Rough Trade. It features 19 tracks recorded live from Sawayama's Dynasty Tour show on 17 November 2021, at the Roundhouse in London.)
- Singles: 26
- B-sides: 1
- Music videos: 19 (Note: 19, including videos as a featured artist. 17 as the lead artist.)
- Remix EPs: 1

Japanese singer-songwriter Rina Sawayama has released two studio albums, one live album, one extended play, one remix EP and 26 singles.

Sawayama made her debut in April 2013 with the single "Sleeping in Waking". Her first extended play, Rina, was released in October 2017, generating the singles "Tunnel Vision", "Cyber Stockholm Syndrome", "Alterlife" and "Ordinary Superstar".

Sawayama's debut studio album, Sawayama, was released in April 2020, peaking at #80 on the UK Albums Chart and supported by the singles "STFU!", "Comme des Garçons (Like the Boys)", "XS", "Chosen Family", "Bad Friend" and "Lucid".

Her second studio album, Hold the Girl, was released in September 2022, with the singles "This Hell", "Catch Me in the Air", its title track, "Phantom", "Hurricanes" and "Frankenstein". The album reached #1 on the Scottish Albums Chart. A CD package of Hold the Girl was released exclusively at Rough Trade, with the second disc "Live at the Roundhouse" serving as Sawayama's first live album. The album was recorded during the Dynasty Tour show in London at the Roundhouse.

== Albums ==
=== Studio albums ===
List of albums with selected details and chart positions
Title	Details	Peak chart positions									Sales
Title	Details	JPN	JPN Hot	AUS	IRE	SCO	UK	UK Indie	US	US Indie	Sales
Sawayama	Released: 17 April 2020; Label: Dirty Hit; Formats: LP, CD, cassette, digital download, streaming	166	— (Note: Sawayama did not enter the Billboard Japan Hot 100 albums chart, but peaked at number 65 on the Billboard Japan Download Albums chart.)	—	—	24	80	5	— (Note: Sawayama did not enter the Billboard 200, but peaked at number six on the Top Heatseekers chart and number 82 on the Current Album Sales chart.)	43	UK: 30,990
Hold the Girl	Released: 16 September 2022; Label: Dirty Hit; Formats: LP, CD, cassette, digital download, streaming	36	29	12	5	1	3	2	166	23	UK: 13,961
"—" denotes items which were not released in that country or failed to chart.

=== Live albums ===
List of live albums with selected details
Title	Details
Live at the Roundhouse	Released: 16 September 2022; Label: Dirty Hit; Format: CD

== Extended plays ==
=== Studio EPs ===
List of extended plays with selected details and chart positions
Title	Details	Peak chart positions
Title	Details	JPN Dig.
Rina	Released: 27 October 2017; Label: Self-released (Note: Initially, the EP was self-released, but it was later reissued under Dirty Hit after Sawayama signed with them.); Formats: Digital download, streaming, 12" vinyl	40

=== Remix EPs ===
Title	Details
Sawayama Remixed	Released: 27 November 2020; Label: Dirty Hit; Formats: 12" vinyl

== Singles ==
=== As lead artist ===
Title	Year	Peak chart positions			Album
Title	Year	JPN Hot	NZ Hot	UK Down.	Album
"Sleeping in Waking" / "Who?"	2013	—	—	—	Non-album singles
"Terror" (as Riina) (Note: Stylized in all caps.)	2013	—	—	—	Non-album singles
"Tunnel Vision" (solo or with Shamir)	2015	—	—	—	Rina
"Where U Are"	2016	—	—	—	Non-album singles
"This Time Last Year"	2016	—	—	—	Non-album singles
"Cyber Stockholm Syndrome"	2017	—	—	—	Rina
"Alterlife"	2017	—	—	—	Rina
"Valentine (What's It Gonna Be)"	2018	—	—	—	Non-album single
"Ordinary Superstar"	2018	—	—	—	Rina
"Cherry"	2018	—	—	—	Non-album singles
"Flicker"	2018	—	—	—	Non-album singles
"STFU!"	2019	—	—	—	Sawayama
"Comme des Garçons (Like the Boys)" (solo or Brabo remix featuring Pabllo Vittar)	2020	—	—	—	Sawayama
"XS" (solo or remix featuring Bree Runway)	2020	—	—	—	Sawayama
"Chosen Family" (Note: "Chosen Family" with Elton John was included in Elton's 2021 studio album The Lockdown Sessions, as well as Sawayama (Deluxe Edition).) (solo or with Elton John)	2020	—	24	62	Sawayama
"Bad Friend"	2020	—	—	—	Sawayama
"Dance in the Dark" (Spotify Singles)	2020	—	—	—	Sawayama Remixed
"Lucid"	2020	—	—	—	Sawayama (Note: "Lucid" was only featured on the deluxe edition of Sawayama.)
"Enter Sandman"	2021	—	—	—	The Metallica Blacklist
"Follow Me" (with Pabllo Vittar)	2022	—	—	—	Non-album single
"This Hell"	2022	— (Note: "This Hell" did not enter the Billboard Japan Hot 100 chart, but peaked at number eight on the Billboard Japan Hot Overseas Songs chart.)	—	50	Hold the Girl
"Catch Me in the Air"	2022	— (Note: "Catch Me in the Air" did not enter the Billboard Japan Hot 100 chart, but peaked at number 13 on the Billboard Japan Hot Overseas Songs chart.)	—	—	Hold the Girl
"Hold the Girl"	2022	91	—	—	Hold the Girl
"Phantom"	2022	—	—	—	Hold the Girl
"Hurricanes"	2022	—	—	—	Hold the Girl
"Frankenstein"	2022	—	—	—	Hold the Girl
"Eye for an Eye"	2023	— (Note: "Eye for an Eye" did not enter the Billboard Japan Hot 100 chart, but peaked at number 13 on the Billboard Japan Hot Overseas Songs chart.)	—	—	John Wick: Chapter 4
"I'm Free" (with Paris Hilton)	2024	— (Note: "I'm Free" did not enter the Billboard Japan Hot 100 chart, but peaked at number 16 on the Billboard Japan Hot Overseas Songs chart.)	—	—	Infinite Icon
"—" denotes items which were not released in that country or failed to chart.

=== As featured artist ===
Title	Year	Peak chart positions								Certifications	Album
Title	Year	UK	IRE	MLT	NZ Hot	POL	SVK	US Dance	WW Excl. US	Certifications	Album
"Beg for You" (Charli XCX featuring Rina Sawayama)	2022	24	33	3	10	15	32	10	195	BPI: Silver	Crash
"Eve, Psyche & the Bluebeard's Wife" (Remix) (Le Sserafim featuring Rina Sawayama)	2023	—	—	—	—	—	—	—	—		Non-album single
"Kiss Me" (Empress Of featuring Rina Sawayama)	2023	—	—	—	—	—	—	—	—		For Your Consideration
"—" denotes items which were not released in that country or failed to chart.

== Other charted songs ==
Title	Year	Peak chart positions		Album
Title	Year	Japan Hot OS	US Dance	Album
"Free Woman" (Clarence Clarity Remix) (Lady Gaga featuring Rina Sawayama)	2021	—	20	Dawn of Chromatica
"Imagining" (featuring Amaarae)	2023	17	—	Hold the Girl: Bonus Edition
"—" denotes items which were not released in that country or failed to chart.

== Music videos ==
=== As lead artist ===
Title	Year	Director(s)	Associated album	Ref.
"Sleeping in Waking"	2013	Jack Greeley-Ward	Non-album single	
"Tunnel Vision"	2015	Arvida Byström	Rina	
"Where U Are"	2016	Ali Kurr, Rina Sawayama	Non-album single	
"Cyber Stockholm Syndrome"	2017	Anoushka Seigler	Rina	
"Ordinary Superstar"	2018	Can Evgin	Rina	
"Cherry"	2018	Isaac Lock	Non-album singles	
"Cherry" (Piano Version)	2019	Jake Gabbay	Non-album singles	
"STFU!"	2019	Ali Kurr, Rina Sawayama	Sawayama	
"Comme des Garçons (Like the Boys)"	2020	Eddie Whelan	Sawayama	
"XS"	2020	Ali Kurr	Sawayama	
"Bad Friend"	2020	Ali Kurr	Sawayama	
"Lucid"	2020	Dave Ferner, Ksenia Kulakova	Sawayama	
"Follow Me" (with Pabllo Vittar)	2022	Lauren Kessler	Non-album single	
"This Hell"	2022	Ali Kurr	Hold the Girl	
"Hold the Girl"	2022	Ali Kurr	Hold the Girl	
"Hurricanes"	2022	Ali Kurr	Hold the Girl	
"Frankenstein"	2022	Jak Payne	Hold the Girl	

=== As featured artist ===
Title	Year	Director(s)	Associated album	Ref.
"Beg for You" (Charli XCX featuring Rina Sawayama)	2022	Nick Harwood	Crash	
"Kiss Me" (Empress Of featuring Rina Sawayama)	2023	India Harris	For Your Consideration	
