= List of Rina Sawayama live performances =

Rina Sawayama live performances
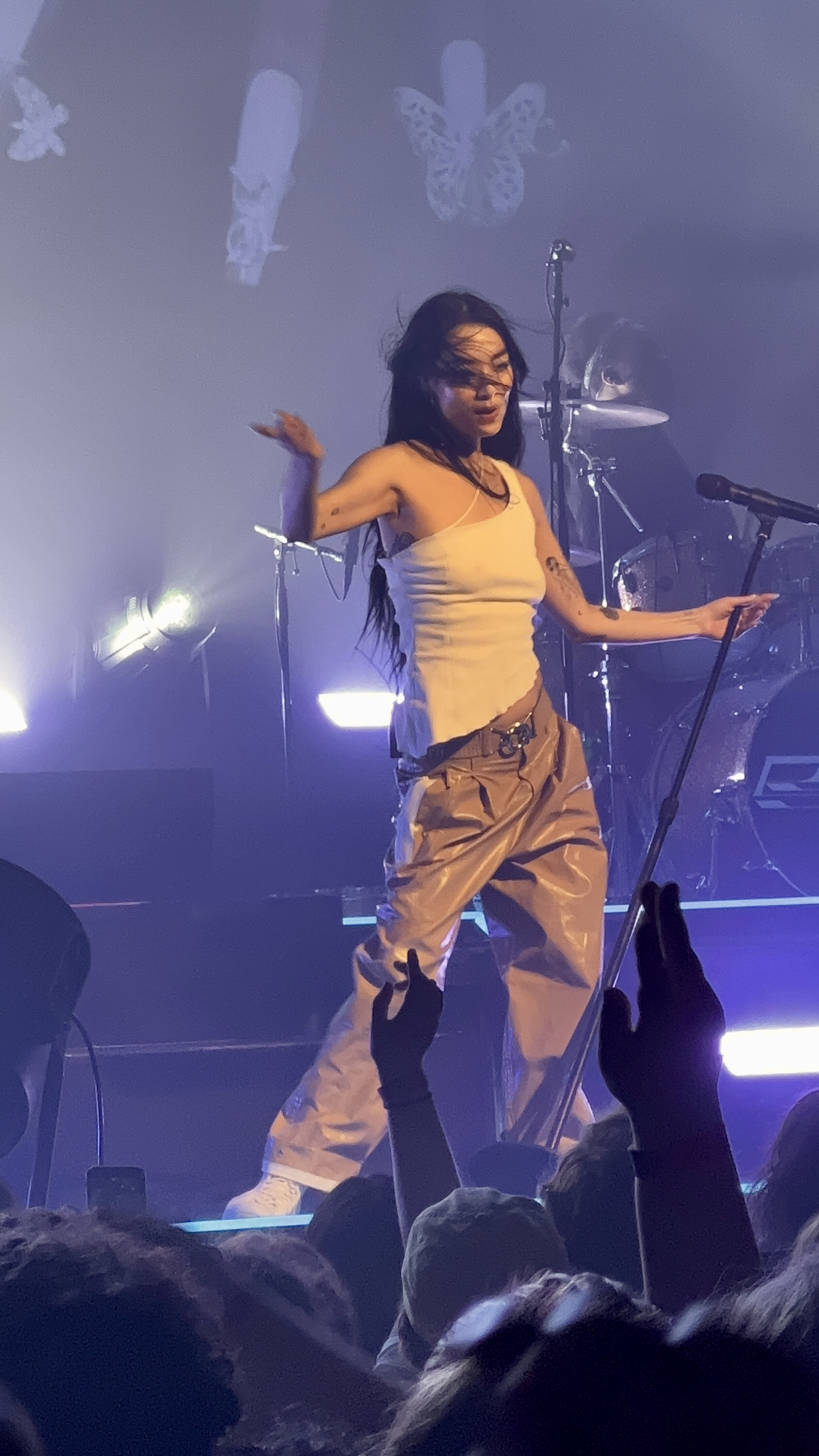
- Sawayama performing for The Dynasty Tour in Minneapolis (2022)
- Headlining tours: 4
- Supporting tours: 2
- Music festivals: 26
- One-off concerts: 12
- Television shows: 6
- Radio shows: 4
- Award ceremonies: 3

Since her debut in 2013, Japanese singer-songwriter Rina Sawayama has embarked on four concert tours. She has performed at 26 music festivals, twelve one-off concerts, six television shows, four radio shows and three award ceremonies, reaching 22 countries across four different continents.

Sawayama began her live career with a November 2017 performance at London's Pickle Factory, a venue with a capacity of 150. She later performed more shows in London, as well as in New York City and Los Angeles, before beginning her first official tour in 2018, the Ordinary Superstar Tour. The tour supported Sawayama's debut extended play Rina, visiting 5 major North American cities, and London.

In 2019, Sawayama began performing in music festivals and joined as a support act on Charli XCX's Charli Live Tour in the United Kingdom. In January 2020, Sawayama announced The Dynasty Tour in support of her debut album Sawayama (2020), which would've seen her perform in the United States, Canada and the UK between April and May 2020, but the tour was postponed due to the COVID-19 pandemic. The tour eventually took place between November 2021 and May 2022.

In May 2022, shortly after concluding The Dynasty Tour, Sawayama announced the first leg of the Hold the Girl Tour in support of her second studio album, Hold the Girl (2022), consisting of shows in the United Kingdom and Ireland. Later legs of the tour would visit the United States, Australasia, Japan and mainland Europe. Between June and October 2023, Sawayama embarked on the Hold the Girl: Reloaded Tour, a revamped version of the previous one.

== Tours ==
=== Headlining ===
Title	First date	Last date	Associated album	Continent(s)	Opening acts
Ordinary Superstar Tour	12 September 2018	19 October 2018	Rina	Europe; North America	Bubble T; Clarence Clarity; Dorian Electra; Oh Annie Oh; S4U
The Dynasty Tour	8 November 2021	13 May 2022	Sawayama	Europe; North America	Ama Jones; Hana
Hold the Girl Tour	12 October 2022	27 February 2023	Hold the Girl	Asia; Europe; North America; Oceania	Adam Kraft; Alex Chapman; DJ Coleslaw; Empress Of; Joesef; Lauren Aquilina; Sans Soucis; Tom Rasmussen
Hold the Girl Reloaded Tour	9 June 2023	9 October 2023	Hold the Girl	North America	Anais Chantal; Empress Of; Magdalena Bay; Tom Rasmussen

=== Supporting ===
Title	Headlining artist	First opening date	Last opening date	Continent(s)
Palo Santo Tour	Years & Years	5 December 2018		Europe
Charli Live Tour	Charli XCX	27 October 2019	31 October 2019	Europe

== Ordinary Superstar Tour ==
Ordinary Superstar Tour
- Tour by Rina Sawayama
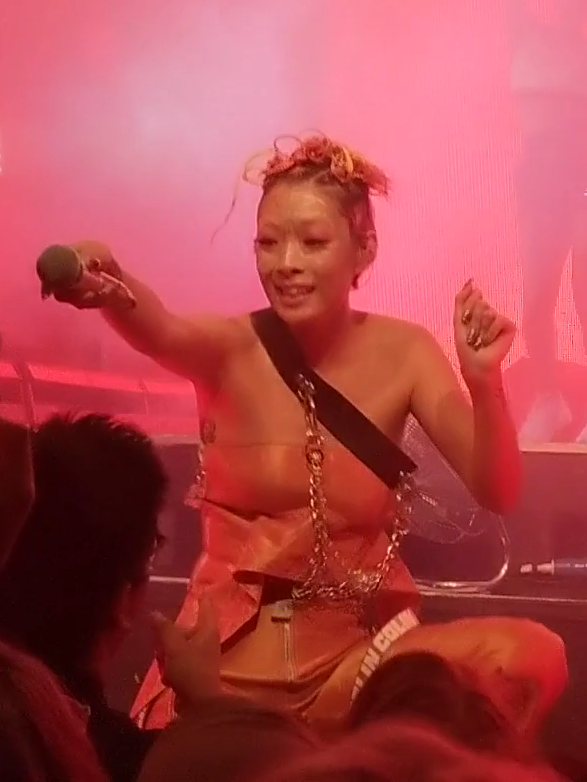
- Sawayama in London, England on 19 October 2018
- Location: Europe; North America
- Associated album: Rina
- Start date: 12 September 2018
- End date: 19 October 2018
- No. of shows: 7

Rina Sawayama concert chronology
- Ordinary Superstar Tour (2018); The Dynasty Tour (2022)

The Ordinary Superstar Tour was Rina Sawayama's debut concert tour, in support of her debut EP Rina. The tour began in New York City on 12 September 2018 and concluded in London on 19 October 2018, visiting 5 major cities in North America.

=== Set list ===
This set list is from the tour's final show on 19 October 2018 in London, England. It is not intended to represent all shows from the tour.

1. "Alterlife"
2. "10-20-40"
3. "Valentine (What's It Gonna Be?)"
4. "Time Out" (interlude)
5. "Dynasty"
6. "Where U Are"
7. "Tunnel Vision"
8. "Play on Me"
9. "How We Were Then"
10. "Take Me As I Am"
11. "Cherry"
12. "Ordinary Superstar"
13. "Flicker" (encore)
14. "Cyber Stockholm Syndrome" (encore)

=== Shows ===
Date (2018)	City	Country	Venue	Opening act(s)
12 September	New York	United States	Elsewhere	Bubble T Dorian Electra
13 September	New York	United States	Bowery Ballroom	Clarence Clarity; Dorian Electra
14 September	Chicago	United States	Subterranean	Dorian Electra
15 September	Toronto	Canada	The Velvet Underground	Dorian Electra
18 September	Los Angeles	United States	Teragram Ballroom	Clarence Clarity; Dorian Electra
20 September	San Francisco	United States	Rickshaw Stop	Dorian Electra
19 October	London	England	Heaven	Oh Annie Oh; S4U

== The Dynasty Tour ==
The Dynasty Tour
- Tour by Rina Sawayama
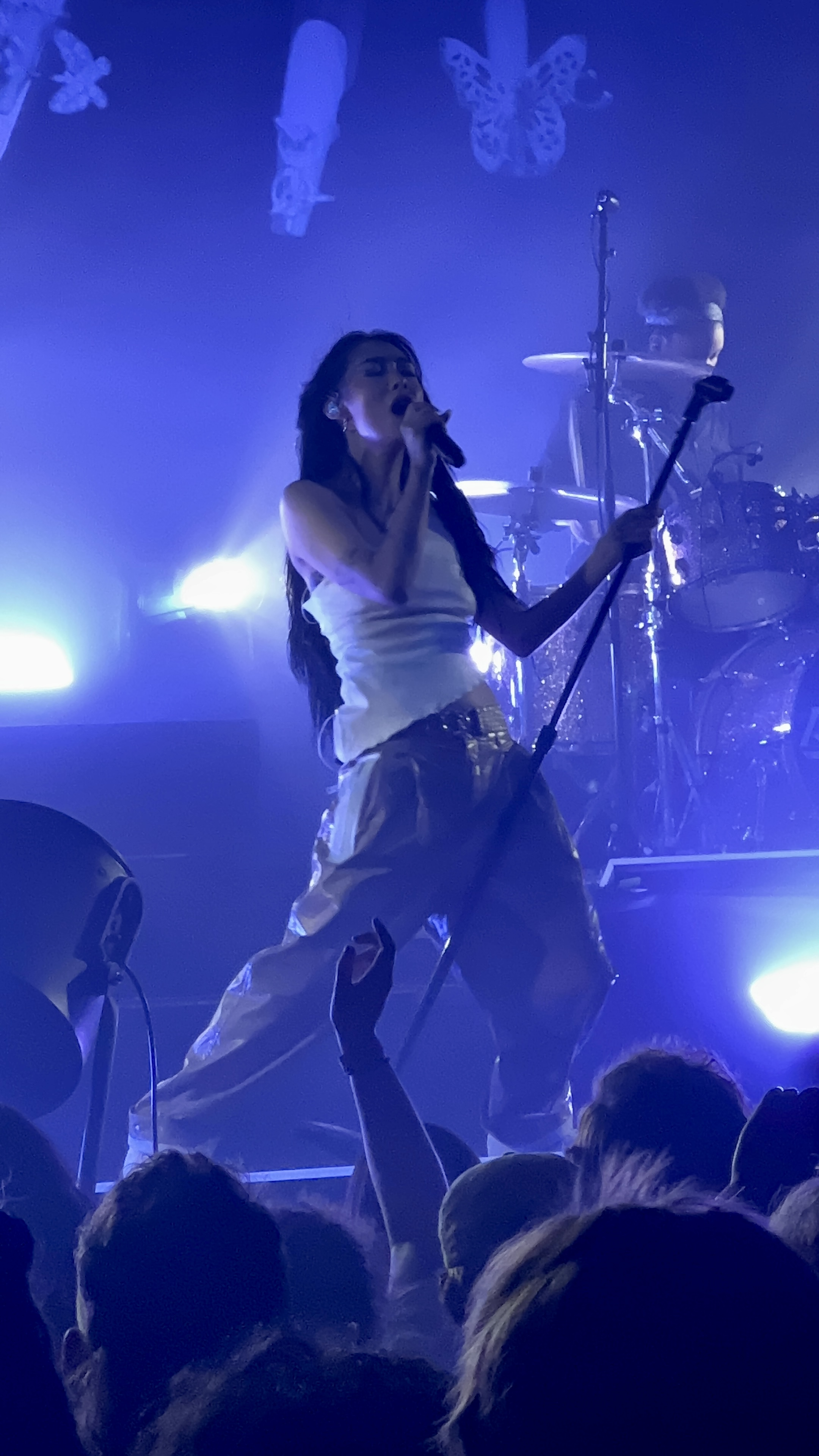
- Sawayama in Minneapolis, Minnesota on 29 April 2022
- Location: Europe; North America
- Associated album: Sawayama
- Start date: 8 November 2021
- End date: 13 May 2022
- Legs: 2
- No. of shows: 25

Rina Sawayama concert chronology
- Ordinary Superstar Tour (2018); The Dynasty Tour (2022); Hold the Girl Tour (2022–23)

The Dynasty Tour was Rina Sawayama's second concert tour, in support of her debut album, Sawayama. The tour began in Dublin, Ireland on 8 November 2021 and concluded in New York City on 13 May 2022. (Note: There were two shows in New York on 13 May 2022. The first being a regular Dynasty Tour show at Terminal 5, followed by an afterparty at Webster Hall, where Sawayama performed a 4-track setlist.)

The tour was original planned to take place in 2020, but was postponed several times due to the COVID-19 pandemic. It consisted of two legs; the first in the UK and Ireland, and the second in the United States. In between the two legs, the tour would've visited mainland Europe, but this leg was cancelled due to the later breakout of the virus's Omicron variant.

=== Set list ===
This set list is from the concert on 9 November 2021 in Manchester, England. It is not intended to represent all shows from the tour.

1. "Dynasty"
2. "STFU!"
3. "Comme des Garçons (Like the Boys)"
4. "Akasaka Sad"
5. "Snakeskin"
6. "Cyber Stockholm Syndrome"
7. "Paradisin'"
8. "Love Me 4 Me"
9. "Bad Friend"
10. "Fuck This World"
11. "Who's Gonna Save U Now?"
12. "Tokyo Love Hotel"
13. "Chosen Family"
14. "Cherry"
15. "XS" (encore)
16. "Lucid" (encore)
17. "Free Woman" (Lady Gaga cover) (encore)

=== Shows ===
Date	City	Country	Venue	Opening act(s)
Leg 1 – Europe
8 November 2021	Dublin	Ireland	The Academy	Hana
9 November 2021	Manchester	England	Albert Hall	Ama Jones; Hana
11 November 2021	Leeds	England	Beckett Students' Union	Ama Jones; Hana
13 November 2021	Glasgow	Scotland	SWG3	Ama Jones; Hana
15 November 2021	Birmingham	England	O_{2} Institute Birmingham	Ama Jones; Hana
16 November 2021	London	England	Electric Brixton	Ama Jones; Hana
17 November 2021 (Note: This show was filmed for a livestream titled The Dynasty Tour Experience.)	London	England	Roundhouse	Ama Jones; Hana
Leg 2 – North America
9 April 2022	Los Angeles	United States	The Fonda Theatre	Hana
11 April 2022	San Francisco	United States	Warfield Theatre	Hana
12 April 2022	San Francisco	United States	Warfield Theatre	Hana
16 April 2022 (Note: The shows on 16 and 23 April 2022 were part of Coachella.)	Indio	United States	Empire Polo Club	—N/a
19 April 2022	Seattle	United States	Neptune Theatre	Hana
20 April 2022	Portland	United States	Roseland Theater	Hana
23 April 2022 (Note: The shows on 16 and 23 April 2022 were part of Coachella.)	Indio	United States	Empire Polo Club	—N/a
26 April 2022	Denver	United States	Ogden Theatre	Hana
29 April 2022	Minneapolis	United States	First Avenue	Hana
30 April 2022	Chicago	United States	Riviera Theatre	Hana
2 May 2022	Toronto	Canada	History	Hana
3 May 2022	Montreal	Canada	Corona Theatre	Hana
5 May 2022	Boston	United States	Royale	Hana
6 May 2022	Washington, D.C.	United States	The Howard	Hana
7 May 2022	Philadelphia	United States	The Fillmore at the Theater of the Living Arts	Hana
8 May 2022	New York	United States	Brooklyn Steel	Hana
9 May 2022	New York	United States	Brooklyn Steel	Hana
13 May 2022 (Note: There were two shows in New York on 13 May 2022. The first being a regular Dynasty Tour show at Terminal 5, followed by an afterparty at Webster Hall, where Sawayama performed a 4-track setlist.)	New York	United States	Terminal 5	Hana
13 May 2022	New York	United States	Webster Hall	Chopstix; Girlboss Today; Hana; Thelimitdoesnotexist

=== Cancelled shows ===
Date	City	Country	Venue	Intended support act	Reason
11 March 2022	Amsterdam	Netherlands	Melkweg Oude Zaal	Hana	COVID-19 pandemic in Europe
19 March 2022	Paris	France	La Gaîté Lyrique	Hana	COVID-19 pandemic in Europe
20 March 2022	Brussels	Belgium	Botanique Orangerie	Hana	COVID-19 pandemic in Europe
22 March 2022	Amsterdam	Netherlands	Melkweg Oude Zaal	Hana	COVID-19 pandemic in Europe
23 March 2022	Berlin	Germany	Lido	Hana	COVID-19 pandemic in Europe

== Hold the Girl Tour ==
Hold the Girl Tour
- Tour by Rina Sawayama
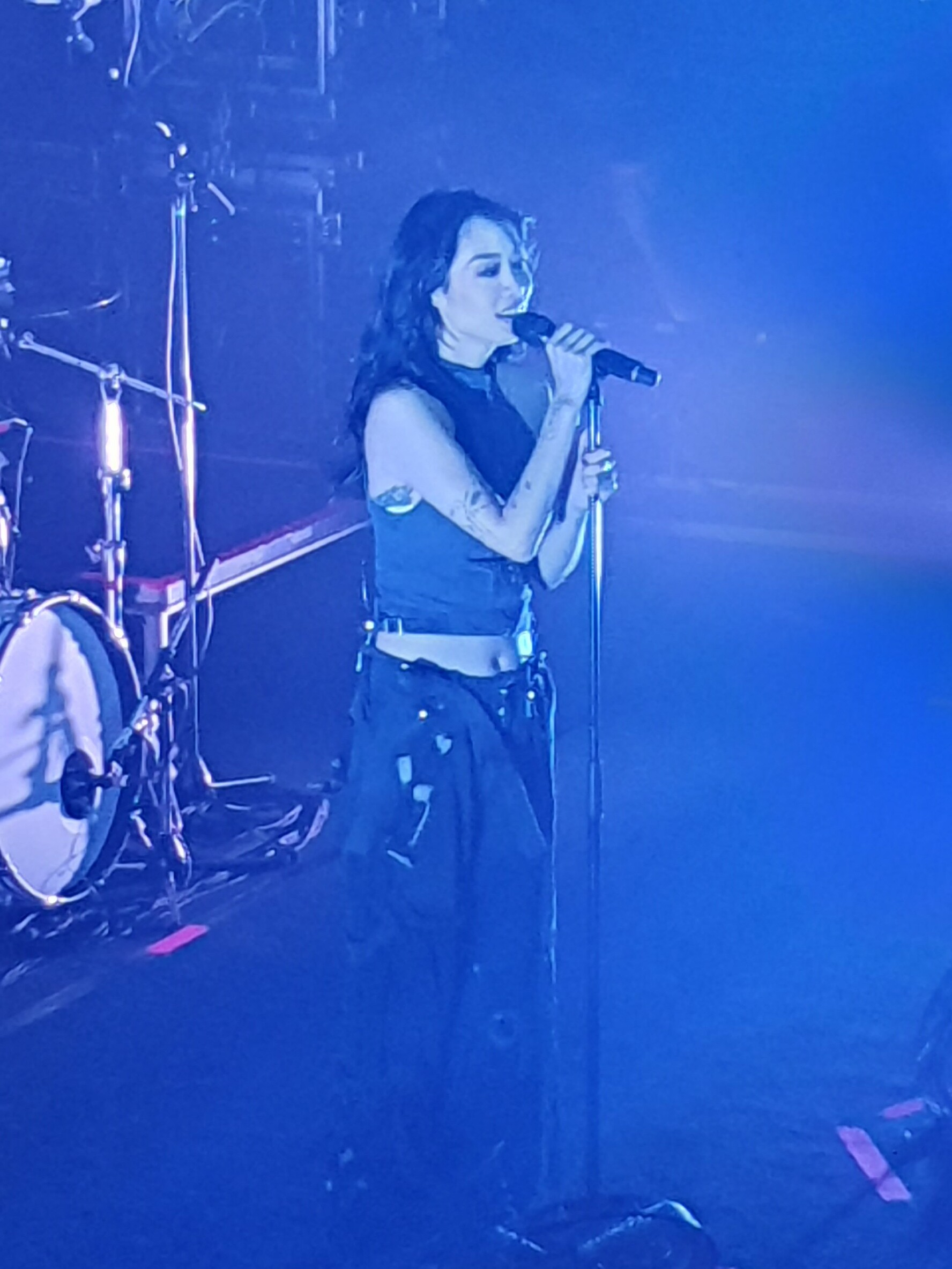
- Sawayama in Auckland, New Zealand on 9 January 2023
- Location: Europe; North America; Oceania; Asia
- Associated album: Hold the Girl
- Start date: 12 October 2022
- End date: 27 February 2023
- Legs: 5
- No. of shows: 41

Rina Sawayama concert chronology
- Dynasty Tour (2022); Hold the Girl Tour (2022–23); Hold the Girl Reloaded Tour (2023)

The Hold the Girl Tour was the third concert tour by Rina Sawayama, launched in support of her second studio album, Hold the Girl. The tour began in Glasgow, Scotland on 12 October 2022 and concluded on 27 February 2023 in Oslo, Norway after 5 legs.

=== Set list ===
1. "Minor Feelings"
2. "Hold the Girl"
3. "Catch Me in the Air"
4. "Hurricanes"
5. "Your Age"
6. "Imagining"
7. "STFU!"
8. "Frankenstein"
9. "Holy (Till You Let Me Go)"
10. "Bad Friend"
11. "Send My Love to John"
12. "Phantom"
13. "To Be Alive"
14. "Lucid"
15. "Beg for You"
16. "Comme des Garçons (Like the Boys)"
17. "XS"
18. "This Hell" (encore)

=== Shows ===
Date	City	Country	Venue	Support act
Leg 1 – Europe
12 October 2022	Glasgow	Scotland	SWG3	Tom Rasmussen
13 October 2022	Glasgow	Scotland	SWG3	Tom Rasmussen
15 October 2022	Dublin	Ireland	Olympia Theatre	Tom Rasmussen
16 October 2022	Dublin	Ireland	Olympia Theatre	Tom Rasmussen
18 October 2022	Nottingham	England	Rock City	Joesef; Tom Rasmussen
20 October 2022	Manchester	England	Manchester Academy 1	Joesef; Tom Rasmussen
21 October 2022	Birmingham	England	O_{2} Academy Birmingham	Joesef; Tom Rasmussen
23 October 2022	Brighton	England	Brighton Dome	Joesef; Tom Rasmussen
24 October 2022	Cardiff	Wales	Great Hall of Cardiff University	Joesef; Tom Rasmussen
26 October 2022	London	England	O_{2} Academy Brixton	Joesef; Tom Rasmussen
Leg 2 – North America
1 November 2022	New York	United States	Avant Gardner (great hall)	--
11 November 2022	Dallas	United States	South Side Ballroom	Lauren Aquilina
12 November 2022	Austin	United States	Emo's	Lauren Aquilina
13 November 2022	Houston	United States	White Oak Music Hall (downstairs)	Lauren Aquilina
16 November 2022	Phoenix	United States	The Van Buren	Lauren Aquilina
18 November 2022	San Diego	United States	SOMA (mainstage)	Lauren Aquilina
19 November 2022	Los Angeles	United States	Hollywood Palladium	Lauren Aquilina
21 November 2022	Oakland	United States	Fox Theatre	Adam Kraft
23 November 2022	Los Angeles	United States	Hollywood Palladium	Alex Chapman
28 November 2022 (Note: The show on 28 November 2022 was originally scheduled for 2 November 2022, but was postponed due to Sawayama sustaining a vocal injury.)	New York	United States	Avant Gardner (great hall)	—N/a
29 November 2022 (Note: The show on 29 November 2022 was originally scheduled for 5 November 2022, but was postponed due to Sawayama sustaining a vocal injury.)	Silver Spring	United States	The Fillmore	—N/a
30 November 2022 (Note: The show on 30 November 2022 was originally scheduled for 6 November 2022, but was postponed due to Sawayama sustaining a vocal injury.)	Charlotte	United States	The Fillmore	—N/a
2 December 2022 (Note: The show on 2 December 2022 was originally scheduled for 4 November 2022, but was postponed due to Sawayama sustaining a vocal injury.)	Boston	United States	Roadrunner	DJ Coleslaw
Leg 3 – Oceania
9 January 2023	Auckland	New Zealand	The Powerstation	—N/a
10 January 2023	Melbourne	Australia	170 Russell	—N/a
12 January 2023	Sydney	Australia	UNSW Roundhouse	—N/a
13 January 2023	Melbourne	Australia	170 Russel	—N/a
14 January 2023	Brisbane	Australia	The Triffid	—N/a
Leg 4 – Asia
17 January 2023	Nagoya	Japan	Diamond Hall	—N/a
18 January 2023	Osaka	Japan	Zepp Osaka Bayside	—N/a
20 January 2023	Tokyo	Japan	Tokyo Garden Theater	—N/a
Leg 5 – Europe
10 February 2023 (Note: The show on 10 February 2023 was part of the BRITs Week concert series. The entire performance was acoustic.)	London	England	Lafayette	—N/a
14 February 2023	Brussels	Belgium	Ancienne Belgique	Empress Of
15 February 2023	Paris	France	Olympia	Empress Of
16 February 2023	Zürich	Switzerland	Volkshaus	Empress Of
18 February 2023	Milan	Italy	Fabrique	Sans Soucis
19 February 2023	Munich	Germany	Muffathalle	Empress Of
21 February 2023	Utrecht	Netherlands	TivoliVredenburg (Ronda)	Empress Of
23 February 2023	Warsaw	Poland	Klub Stodoła	Empress Of
24 February 2023	Berlin	Germany	Huxleys Neue Welt	Empress Of
26 February 2023	Stockholm	Sweden	Berns Salonger	Empress Of
27 February 2023	Oslo	Norway	Rockefeller Music Hall	Empress Of

=== Cancelled shows ===
Date	City	Country	Venue	Intended support act	Reason
8 November 2022	Atlanta	United States	The Eastern	Lauren Aquilina	Strained vocals
9 November 2022	Nashville	United States	Marathon Music Works	Lauren Aquilina	Strained vocals

== Hold the Girl: Reloaded Tour ==
Hold the Girl: Reloaded Tour
- Tour by Rina Sawayama
- Location: North America
- Associated album: Hold the Girl
- Start date: 9 June 2023
- End date: 9 October 2023
- No. of shows: 14

Rina Sawayama concert chronology
- Hold the Girl Tour (2022–23); Hold the Girl: Reloaded Tour (2023)

The Hold the Girl: Reloaded Tour was the fourth concert tour by British and Japanese singer Rina Sawayama, and the second tour in support of the Hold the Girl album.

The 2023 North American tour began on 9 June in North Adams, Massachusetts and concluded on 9 October in New Orleans, Louisiana. It is based on the original Hold the Girl Tour, but was given revamped costumes and stage designs.

=== Shows ===
Date (2023)	City	Country	Venue	Support act
9 June	North Adams	United States	Massachusetts Museum of Contemporary Art	—N/a
10 June (Note: The show on 10 June 2023 was part of the Governors Ball Music Festival.)	New York	United States	Flushing Meadows–Corona Park	—N/a
16 June (Note: The show on 16 June 2023 was part of Bonnaroo Music Festival.)	Manchester	United States	Great Stage Park	—N/a
4 August (Note: The show on 4 August 2023 was part of the Osheaga Festival.)	Montreal	Canada	Parc Jean-Drapeau	—N/a
6 August (Note: The show on 6 August 2023 was part of the Lollapalooza festival.)	Chicago	United States	Grant Park	—N/a
9 August	Toronto	Canada	History	Magdalena Bay; Tom Rasmussen
10 August	Toronto	Canada	History	Magdalena Bay; Tom Rasmussen
11 August	New York	United States	The Rooftop at Pier 17	Magdalena Bay
22 September (Note: The show on 22 September 2023 was part of the Twilight Concert Series.)	Salt Lake City	United States	Gallivan Center	Anais Chantal; Empress Of; Tom Rasmussen
24 September	Las Vegas	United States	Downtown Las Vegas	—N/a
26 September	Denver	United States	Fillmore Auditorium	Empress Of Tom Rasmussen
28 September	Seattle	United States	Paramount Theatre	Empress Of Tom Rasmussen
6 October	Bentonville	United States	The Momentary	Empress Of Tom Rasmussen
9 October	New Orleans	United States	House of Blues	Empress Of Tom Rasmussen

== Broadcast performances ==
Air date	Programme	City	Country	Ref.
26 October 2020	The Tonight Show Starring Jimmy Fallon	New York	United States	
15 March 2021	Brits 2021 Rising Star Session	London	England	
19 April 2021	Tiny Desk (Home) Concert	Unknown		
19 May 2022	The Tonight Show Starring Jimmy Fallon	New York	United States	
27 July 2022 (Note: Filmed on 19 April 2022.)	Live on KEXP	Seattle	United States	
18 September 2022	Sunday Brunch	London	England	
27 September 2022	Live Lounge	London	England	
30 October 2022 (Note: Filmed on 29 October 2022.)	Strictly Come Dancing	Borehamwood	England	
31 October 2022	Late Night with Seth Meyers	New York	United States	
6 December 2022	The Graham Norton Show	London	England	

== Other performances ==
Date	Event	City	Country	Venue	Opening act(s)	Ref.
2 November 2017	—N/a	London	England	The Pickle Factory	—N/a	
1 February 2018	Mexico 66 SD launch party	Tokyo	Japan	Wall&Wall	—N/a	
2 March 2018	by:Larm	Oslo	Norway	Design og arkitektur Norge	—N/a	
28 March 2018	—N/a	London	England	The Borderline	—N/a	
24 April 2018	—N/a	New York	United States	Mercury Lounge	Molly Soda	
25 April 2018	—N/a	New York	United States	Mercury Lounge	K Rizz	
30 April 2018	School Night	Los Angeles	United States	Bardot	—N/a	
1 May 2018	—N/a	Los Angeles	United States	Moroccan Lounge	Zsela	
17 May 2018	The Great Escape	Brighton and Hove	England	Coalition	—N/a	
18 May 2018	The Great Escape	Brighton and Hove	England	Wagner Hall	—N/a	
25 May 2018	—N/a	London	England	The Garage	—N/a	
5 December 2018	Palo Santo Tour (Note: On this date, Sawayama appeared as the opening act for Years & Years.)	London	England	The O_{2} Arena	Astrid S Kiki's House of Tea	
27 March 2019	AMP London	London	England	Moth Club	Georgia; Suzi Wu	
26 May 2019	All Points East	London	England	Victoria Park	—N/a	
8 June 2019	Pride Rocks PGH	Pittsburgh	United States	Pennsylvania Lottery Stage	—N/a	
28 June 2019	LadyLand	New York	United States	Brooklyn Mirage	—N/a	
3 August 2019	Brighton Pride	Brighton and Hove	England	Preston Park	—N/a	
27 October 2019	Charli Live Tour (Note: On these dates, Sawayama appeared as the opening act for Charli XCX.)	Glasgow	Scotland	SWG3	—N/a	
28 October 2019	Charli Live Tour	Birmingham	England	O_{2} Institute Birmingham	—N/a	
30 October 2019	Charli Live Tour	Manchester	England	Albert Hall	—N/a	
31 October 2019	Charli Live Tour	London	England	O_{2} Brixton Academy	Brooke Candy	
2 December 2020	Attitude Awards	London	England	Roundhouse	—N/a	
19 November 2021	Gay Times Honours	London	England	Magazine London	—N/a	
2 March 2022	NME Awards	London	England	O_{2} Brixton Academy	—N/a	
18 March 2022	Crash album release show (Note: This was a Charli XCX concert. Sawayama joined Charli onstage to perform their duet, Beg for You together. The performance was livestreamed on Amazon Music.)	London	England	Edition	—N/a	
29 May 2022	BBC Radio 1's Big Weekend	Coventry	England	War Memorial Park	—N/a	
1 June 2022	Primavera Sound	Barcelona	Spain	Poble Espanyol	—N/a	
2 June 2022	Primavera Sound	Sant Adrià de Besòs	Spain	Platja del Fòrum i Parc de la Pau	—N/a	
10 June 2022	Primavera Sound	Póvoa de Varzim	Portugal	Parque da Cidade	—N/a	
24 June 2022	British Summer Time	London	England	Hyde Park	—N/a	
26 June 2022	Mother Pride Block Party	Dublin	Ireland	National Museum of Ireland – Decorative Arts and History	—N/a	
30 June 2022	Roskilde Festival	Roskilde	Denmark	Darupvej	—N/a	
22 July 2022	Latitude Festival	Wangford with Henham	England	Henham Park	—N/a	
20 August 2022	Summer Sonic Festival	Tokyo	Japan	Zozo Marine Stadium	—N/a	
21 August 2022	Summer Sonic Festival	Osaka	Japan	Maishima Sports Island	—N/a	
3 September 2022	Electric Picnic	Stradbally	Ireland	Stradbally Hall	—N/a	
14 September 2022	Hold the Girl album release show	London	England	Pryzm	—N/a	
15 September 2022	Hold the Girl album release show	London	England	Electrowerkz	—N/a	
18 September 2022	Hold the Girl album release show	London	England	Village Underground	—N/a	
29 June 2023	Roskilde Festival	Roskilde	Denmark	Darupvej	—N/a	
6 July 2023	Mad Cool	Madrid	Spain	Valdebebas	—N/a	
8 July 2023	NOS Alive	Algés	Portugal	Passeio Marítimo de Algés	—N/a	
25 August 2023	Leeds Festival	Leeds	England	Bramham Park	—N/a	
27 August 2023	Reading Festival	Reading	England	Little John's Farm	—N/a	
9 September 2023	Lollapalooza	Berlin	Germany	Olympiapark Berlin	—N/a	
