= Hold the Girl =

2022 studio album by Rina Sawayama

- Standard cover (Note: The artwork for the single "Hold the Girl" is used as the album cover in digital and CD formats since 2023.)

Studio album by Rina Sawayama
- Released: 16 September 2022
- Genres: Pop; dance-pop; alternative pop
- Length: 46:04
- Label: Dirty Hit
- Producers: Rina Sawayama; Lauren Aquilina; Paul Epworth; Clarence Clarity; Stuart Price; Marcus Andersson

Rina Sawayama chronology
Sawayama Remixed (2020)	Hold the Girl (2022)

Singles from Hold the Girl
- 1. "This Hell" Released: 18 May 2022; 2. "Catch Me in the Air" Released: 27 June 2022; 3. "Hold the Girl" Released: 27 July 2022; 4. "Phantom" Released: 25 August 2022; 5. "Hurricanes" Released: 12 September 2022; 6. "Frankenstein" Released: 27 October 2022; 7. "Imagining" Released: 8 December 2023

Hold the Girl is the second studio album by Japanese and British singer Rina Sawayama. It was released on 16 September 2022 by Dirty Hit. The album was preceded by five singles: "This Hell", "Catch Me in the Air", "Hold the Girl", "Phantom", and "Hurricanes". "Frankenstein" and "Imagining" were released as singles following the album's release. The album, recorded between 2020 and 2021, features production from collaborators including Paul Epworth, Clarence Clarity, Stuart Price, and Marcus Andersson. Clarity also produced much of Sawayama's debut album Sawayama (2020).

Hold the Girl received critical acclaim upon its release and charted at number three on the UK Albums Chart, becoming the highest-charting album by a Japanese-born solo artist in the history of the chart. It also became Sawayama's first charting album on the US Billboard 200 and peaked at number one on the Scottish Albums Chart. The album was supported by the Hold the Girl Tour (2022–23) and the Hold the Girl: Reloaded Tour (2023). Sawayama also promoted the album via performances on The Graham Norton Show, Strictly Come Dancing and Late Night with Seth Meyers.

== Composition ==
Sawayama has named Kelly Clarkson, the Corrs, Paramore, and Sugababes as artists who influenced Hold the Girl, as well as Taylor Swift's 2020 album Folklore. Variety's Thania Garcia described Hold the Girl as "an evolution in [Sawayama's] style that will meld influences from across the pop spectrum". In a September 2023 interview with BBC News, Sawayama revealed that she was sexually groomed by a school teacher when aged 17. This heavily influenced the lyrical meaning behind Hold the Girl, particularly the album track "Your Age". Sawayama received sex and relationship therapy for the trauma.

Musically, Hold the Girl is produced, performed, and recorded in a wide variety of genres. Primarily a pop record, specifically styled under the dance-pop and alternative pop subgenres. It also contains elements of 1990s alternative rock, pop rock, soft rock, Europop, trance, industrial, country pop, hi-NRG, pop punk, Eurotrance, stadium rock, Britpop, disco, R&B, hyperpop, J-pop, house, Eurodance, electronic, UK garage, techno, folk and psychedelic music.

=== Songs ===
The album's lead single "This Hell", a country pop song with "glam rock riffs", was called a "thrilling empowerment anthem" by Paste's Jade Gomez, who suggested its first lyric, "Let's go girls", nods Shania Twain's similar introduction in her 1999 song "Man! I Feel Like a Woman!". The author affirmed that the song introduces Sawayama's approach on country music. Sawayama reflected that the genre "represents comfort, brilliant storytelling and authentic expression of the writer's reality"; she dubbed the song "euphoric and tongue-in-cheek". She worked with Paul Epworth in "This Hell", a collaboration she had "dream[ed]" of doing, and they finished the track in one day. According to Sawayama, the track was written as a response to "human rights that are being taken away from minorities at a rapid rate in the name of traditional religious beliefs", particularly the rights of the LGBT community; Sawayama stated: "When the world tells us we don't deserve love and protection, we have no choice but to give love and protection to each other. This hell is better with you". The song references gay icons, namely Britney Spears, Whitney Houston and Diana, Princess of Wales, and criticises the paparazzi's "cruelty" towards them.

Writing for Rolling Stone UK, Hannah Ewens stated that the album's title track presents Sawayama singing with 2000s R&B vocals and "opens like a holy gesture to Madonna's 'Like a Prayer' and becomes an emotional dancefloor filler". Rob Sheffield of the American edition of the same publication likened the track to Lady Gaga. The author described "Catch Me in the Air" as a celebration of Sawayama's relationship with her mother, written like a "Corrs song as if pitched to Gwen Stefani". The singer herself stated that she "wanted to write about this weird relationship with single parents. You do catch each other in the air". The seventh track, "Your Age", is a "mix of bhangra and electro-warp sound effects". The ninth track, "Frankenstein" is a "tense and tetchy indie track featuring the singer begging someone to therapise her, to 'put me together, make me better'", and featuring a "digital 'hey, hey, hey' chant halfway between AC/DC and the Village People".

== Promotion ==
Before an official announcement, Sawayama's second record was listed among the most anticipated albums of 2022 by Stereogum and DIY. In May 2022, Sawayama began advertising a forthcoming release through social media content and pamphlets with "blood-red" background and the text "Rina is going to hell" in all caps. The same month, she released lead single "This Hell", and announced Hold the Girl, a release date of 2 September and an accompanying tour beginning on 12 October. Following the announcement, the album was named one of Vulture's "36 Albums We Can't Wait to Hear This Summer".

The singer performed "This Hell" in The Tonight Show Starring Jimmy Fallon on 19 May and during the BBC Radio 1's Big Weekend on 29 May. A music video for the song, directed by Ali Kurr, premiered on 15 June. A second single, "Catch Me in the Air", was issued on 27 June. The album's title track was released as the third single on 27 July; the same day, she announced that the album was pushed back to 16 September due to "production issues" and that a fourth single would be made available before the date. Kurr also directed the music video for "Hold the Girl", which was released on 3 August. The fourth single, "Phantom", was released on 25 August. The fifth single, "Hurricanes", was released on 12 September, four days before the album's release.

The album's second concert tour, the Hold the Girl Reloaded Tour was announced in March 2023, and took place across North America between June and October 2023.

== Reception ==
Professional ratings
Aggregate scores
Source	Rating
AnyDecentMusic?	8.1/10
Metacritic	84/100
Review scores
Source	Rating
AllMusic	4.5/5 stars
Clash	9/10
DIY	5/5 stars
Exclaim!	7/10
Financial Times	4/5 stars
The Independent	4/5 stars
NME	5/5 stars
Pitchfork	6.5/10
The Skinny	4/5 stars
Slant Magazine	3.5/5 stars

Hold the Girl received universal critical acclaim upon its release. At Metacritic, which assigns a normalised rating out of 100 based on reviews from mainstream critics, the album received a score of 84 out of 100, based on reviews from 20 critics, indicating "universal acclaim". The album was rated an 8.1 out of 10 on the aggregator AnyDecentMusic?.

Reviewing the album for AllMusic, Neil Z. Yeung called it "one of those albums where each of the vastly different songs could be a hit and, no matter how many times it's been spun, a moment of pause is needed to fully absorb just how good it really is," and claimed it as, "the sound of an artist taking their rightful place on the pop throne." Writing for Pitchfork, Cat Zhang called the album "decidedly more earnest and weighty" than its predecessor and likened it to "an attempt to merge the full-throated spectacle of Born This Way with the surviving-through-trauma emotionality of Chromatica". Zhang additionally opined that the myriad of "genre mash-ups and key changes" mean that "almost every song strives to be Sawayama's 'Bohemian Rhapsody'" but the album's "constant pivots make it hard to track its central concept: revisiting and empathizing with a younger self".

Hannah Mylrea of NME called the record "the best British pop album of the year", complimenting Sawayama's "laser-precision melodies and hooks", "distinctive lyricism" and "impressive level of intimacy" in spite of the "high-octane" tracklist.

== Commercial performance ==
Hold the Girl debuted at number three on the UK Albums Chart; the highest-charting album by a Japanese-born solo artist in the history of the chart, and Sawayama's highest-charting album to date, with sales of 13,961 (of which 7,148 were vinyl copies). In the United States, the album debuted at number 166 on the US Billboard 200, making it her first entry on the chart.

== Track listing ==
Hold the Girl track listing
No.	Title	Writer(s)	Producer(s)	Length
1.	"Minor Feelings"	Rina Sawayama; Lauren Aquilina; Vixen Jamieson	Clarence Clarity; Barney Lister	2:00
2.	"Hold the Girl"	Sawayama; Jonny Lattimer; Barney Lister	Sawayama; Lister	4:05
3.	"This Hell"	Sawayama; Aquilina; Jamieson; Paul Epworth	Clarity; Epworth	3:56
4.	"Catch Me in the Air"	Sawayama; Grace Barker; Oscar Scheller; Stuart Price; Adam Crisp	Sawayama; Clarity; Price	3:35
5.	"Forgiveness"	Sawayama; Lattimer; Richard Cooper; Crisp	Sawayama; Clarity; Price	4:20
6.	"Holy (Til You Let Me Go)"	Sawayama; Nate Campany; Christopher Lyon; Price	Sawayama; Price; David Balfe	3:19
7.	"Your Age"	Sawayama; Aquilina; Marcus Andersson	Sawayama; Clarity; Andersson; Aquilina	2:54
8.	"Imagining"	Sawayama; Aquilina; Jamieson; Crisp	Sawayama; Clarity; Price	3:32
9.	"Frankenstein"	Sawayama; Aquilina; Epworth	Clarity; Epworth	3:12
10.	"Hurricanes"	Sawayama; Crisp	Sawayama; Clarity; Price	3:22
11.	"Send My Love to John"	Sawayama; Aquilina; Andersson	Andersson; Aquilina; Jonathan Gilmore^{[a]}	3:25
12.	"Phantom"	Sawayama; Aquilina; Jamieson; Crisp	Sawayama; Clarity; Price	4:25
13.	"To Be Alive"	Sawayama; Aquilina; Andersson	Sawayama; Price; Andersson; Aquilina	3:54
Total length:				46:00

Hold the Girl – Japanese CD edition (bonus track)
No.	Title	Writer(s)	Producer(s)	Length
14.	"Flavour of the Month"	Sawayama; Lattimer; Cooper	Sawayama; Clarity	2:34
Total length:				48:34

Hold the Girl – 2023 digital bonus edition (bonus tracks)
No.	Title	Writer(s)	Producer(s)	Length
14.	"Imagining" (featuring Amaarae)	Sawayama; Aquilina; Jamieson; Crisp	Sawayama; Clarity; Price	3:32
15.	"Flavour of the Month"	Sawayama; Lattimer; Cooper	Sawayama; Clarity	2:33
Total length:				52:05

Hold the Girl – Rough Trade LP edition bonus CD (Live at Roundhouse, London)
No.	Title	Length
1.	"Dynasty"	3:49
2.	"STFU!"	3:34
3.	"Comme des Garçons (Like the Boys)"	3:35
4.	"Akasaka Sad"	3:18
5.	"Snakeskin"	3:12
6.	"Cyber Stockholm Syndrome"	3:14
7.	"Paradisin'"	2:52
8.	"Love Me 4 Me"	4:04
9.	"Bad Friend"	3:16
10.	"Fuck This World (Interlude)"	1:57
11.	"A Message from Zarah Sultana"	1:06
12.	"Who's Gonna Save U Now?"	3:21
13.	"Tokyo Love Hotel"	2:56
14.	"Chosen Family"	4:26
15.	"Catch Me in the Air"	3:34
16.	"Cherry"	3:37
17.	"XS"	3:24
18.	"Lucid"	1:47
19.	"Free Woman" (remix; Lady Gaga featuring Rina Sawayama and Clarence Clarity)	3:09

Notes

- ^{^[a]} signifies an additional producer
- All tracks vocal produced by Cameron Gower Poole.
- "Minor Feelings" contains a sample from 2019 British film Rocks.

== Personnel ==
=== Musicians ===
- Rina Sawayama – vocals, programming
- Clarence Clarity – synthesizer, guitar, programming
- Paul Epworth – synthesizer, drum programming
- Vixen Jamieson – guitar
- Matt Tong – drums on "Frankenstein"

=== Technical ===
- Rina Sawayama – executive production
- Clarence Clarity – production
- Paul Epworth – production
- Riley MacIntyre – engineering
- Cameron Gower Poole – engineering, vocal production
- Evie Clark-Yospa – engineering
- Jonathan Gilmore – engineering
- Joseph Rodgers – engineering
- Stuart Price – production
- Robin Schmidt – mastering
- Geoff Swan – mixing

=== Artwork ===
- Chester Lockhart – creative direction, design, layout
- Samuel Burgess-Johnson – design, layout
- Thurstan Redding – photography

== Charts ==
Chart performance for Hold the Girl
Chart (2022)	Peak position
Australian Albums (ARIA)	12
Belgian Albums (Ultratop Flanders)	76
Dutch Albums (Album Top 100)	73
Irish Albums (Official Charts)	5
Japanese Albums (Oricon)	36
Japanese Hot Albums (Billboard Japan)	29
Scottish Albums (Official Charts)	1
Spanish Albums (Promusicae)	41
UK Albums (Official Charts)	3
UK Independent Albums (Official Charts)	2
US Billboard 200	166
US Heatseekers Albums (Billboard)	2
US Top Alternative Albums (Billboard)	17
US Independent Albums (Billboard)	23

== Release history ==
Release dates and formats for Hold the Girl
Region	Date	Format(s)	Edition	Label	Ref.
Various	16 September 2022	Cassette; CD; digital download; LP record; streaming	Standard	Dirty Hit	
Japan	16 September 2022	CD	Japanese	Dirty Hit	
Various	8 December 2023	Digital download; streaming	Bonus	Dirty Hit	
