= Roadrunner (venue) =

Concert venue in Boston, US

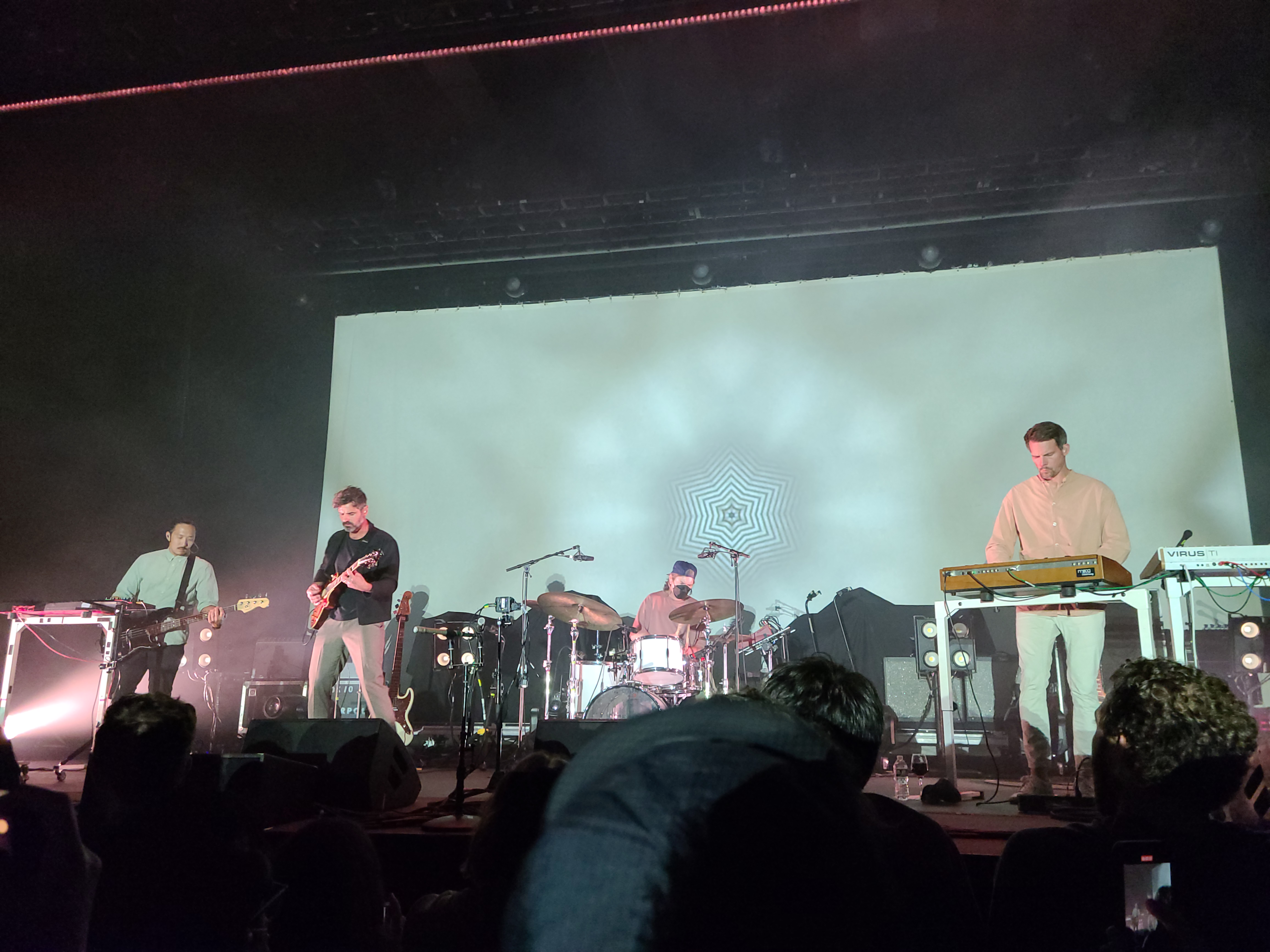
- Tycho performing at the Roadrunner (2022)
- Interactive map of Roadrunner
- Address: 89 Guest St; Boston, MA; United States
- Location: Brighton
- Coordinates: 42.356647°N 71.143932°W
- Operator: Anschutz Entertainment Group
- Seating type: General admission
- Capacity: 3,500
- Public transit: Framingham/Worcester Line at Boston Landing station

Construction
- Groundbreaking: April 1, 2019
- Opened: March 14, 2022

Website
- https://roadrunnerboston.com/

The Roadrunner is a concert venue in the Brighton neighborhood of Boston, Massachusetts. Since its opening on March 15, 2022, the Roadrunner has been the largest general admission concert venue in New England, with a capacity of 3,500. The venue is named after Jonathan Richman's song "Roadrunner".

== History ==
In October 1976, American rock band The Modern Lovers released the song "Roadrunner". Written by Jonathan Richman, the song details the freedom he feels while driving alone, specifically in Boston suburbs. Richman has described the song as an ode to Massachusetts Route 128. Elsewhere, it has been described as "one of the most magical songs in existence" and has had a significant influence on the culture of Massachusetts, with it even being proposed as the official rock song of the state.

On April 1, 2019, construction began on a new venue at 89 Guest Street. After significant delays caused by the COVID-19 pandemic, the venue was opened on March 15, 2022, with a concert by American bluegrass artist Billy Strings. It was given the name Roadrunner as a tribute to Jonathan Richman's song.

In February 2025, the venue is set to host the Something in the Way Fest, featuring over 25 artists on Run for Cover Records. The event will introduce a temporary second stage.

== Size ==
With a capacity of 3,500, the venue is the largest general admission concert venue in New England.

The entire venue is 50,000 square feet (approximately 4,645 square meters) in total. Standing at 60 feet wide, the stage itself has been labeled "arena-sized".

== Transportation and parking ==
The Roadrunner is located at Boston Landing station, part of the MBTA's Framingham/Worcester Line. Alternatively, the Green Line train stops at the Allston Street and Harvard Avenue stations, which, when walking, are approximately 15 minutes away from the venue.

There is no parking area for cars at the Roadrunner, though the venue lists 71, 40, and 80 Guest Street as recommended parking garages.

== Concerts ==
Date	Headliner(s)	Opening act(s)	Event/Tour	Ref.
March 15, 2022	Billy Strings	—N/a	Venue inauguration	
March 17, 2022	Khruangbin	Nubya Garcia	Casa Surreal Tour	
March 18, 2022	Khruangbin	Nubya Garcia	Casa Surreal Tour	
March 19, 2022	Tom Misch	Joel Culpepper	NA Tour 2022	
March 29, 2022	JoJo	Tanerélle, Lindsey Lomis	JoJo Tour 2022	
March 20, 2022	Dropkick Murphys	Jesse Ahern, Jim Lindberg, The Rumjacks	St. Patrick's Day Tour 2022	
March 24, 2022	Bleachers	Charly Bliss	Strange Desire live	
March 25, 2022	Bleachers	Charly Bliss	Gone Now live	
July 26, 2022 (Note: The concerts on July 26 and July 27, 2022, were originally scheduled for March 21 and March 22, 2022, but were rescheduled due to a run-in with COVID-19.)	Mitski	The Weather Station	Laurel Hell Tour	
July 27, 2022	Mitski	The Weather Station	Laurel Hell Tour	
September 29, 2022	Japanese Breakfast	Yo La Tengo	Jubilee Tour	
December 2, 2022 (Note: Rina Sawayama's Hold the Girl Tour was originally scheduled for November 4, 2022, but was postponed when the artist sustained a vocal injury.)	Rina Sawayama	DJ Coleslaw	Hold the Girl Tour	
December 17, 2022	Foals	Glove, Inner Wave	Life Is Yours Tour	
May 9, 2023	Sabrina Carpenter	Blu DeTiger	Emails I Can't Send Tour	
September 22, 2023	Tegan and Sara	Carlie Hanson	Crybaby Tour 2023	
November 29, 2023	Andrew McMahon in the Wilderness	Michigander, Wildermiss	New Friends Tour	
February 18, 2024 (Note: The concert on February 18, 2024, was originally scheduled for November 13, 2023, but was rescheduled, due to an unspecified "admin issue".)	S Club	—N/a	The Good Times Tour	
October 11, 2024	Dayseeker	Alpha Wolf, Catch Your Breath, Kingdom of Giants	Dark Sun Protocol	
August 24, 2024	Something Corporate	Zac Clark, Hidden in Plain View	Out of Office Tour	
October 13, 2024	Fontaines D.C.	Been Stellar	Romance Tour	
October 16, 2024	Declan McKenna	Vlad Holiday	Live in Concert: USA & CA '24	
October 26, 2024	Okean Elzy	—N/a	The Lighthouse Tour 2024	
October 28, 2024	Clairo	Alice Phoebe Lou	Charm Tour	
October 29, 2024	Clairo	Alice Phoebe Lou	Charm Tour	
October 30, 2024	Clairo	Alice Phoebe Lou	Charm Tour	
June 6, 2025	Jack's Mannequin	Yoke Lore	The MFEO Tour	
September 12, 2025	Ethel Cain	9Million	The Willoughby Tucker Forever Tour	
September 18, 2025	Garbage	Starcrawler	Happy Endings tour	
June 12, 2026	Killswitch Engage	Machine Head, Iron Regan, Havok	This Consequence Tour	
