= Rina Sawayama =

Japanese-British singer-songwriter (born 1990)

- リナ・サワヤマ
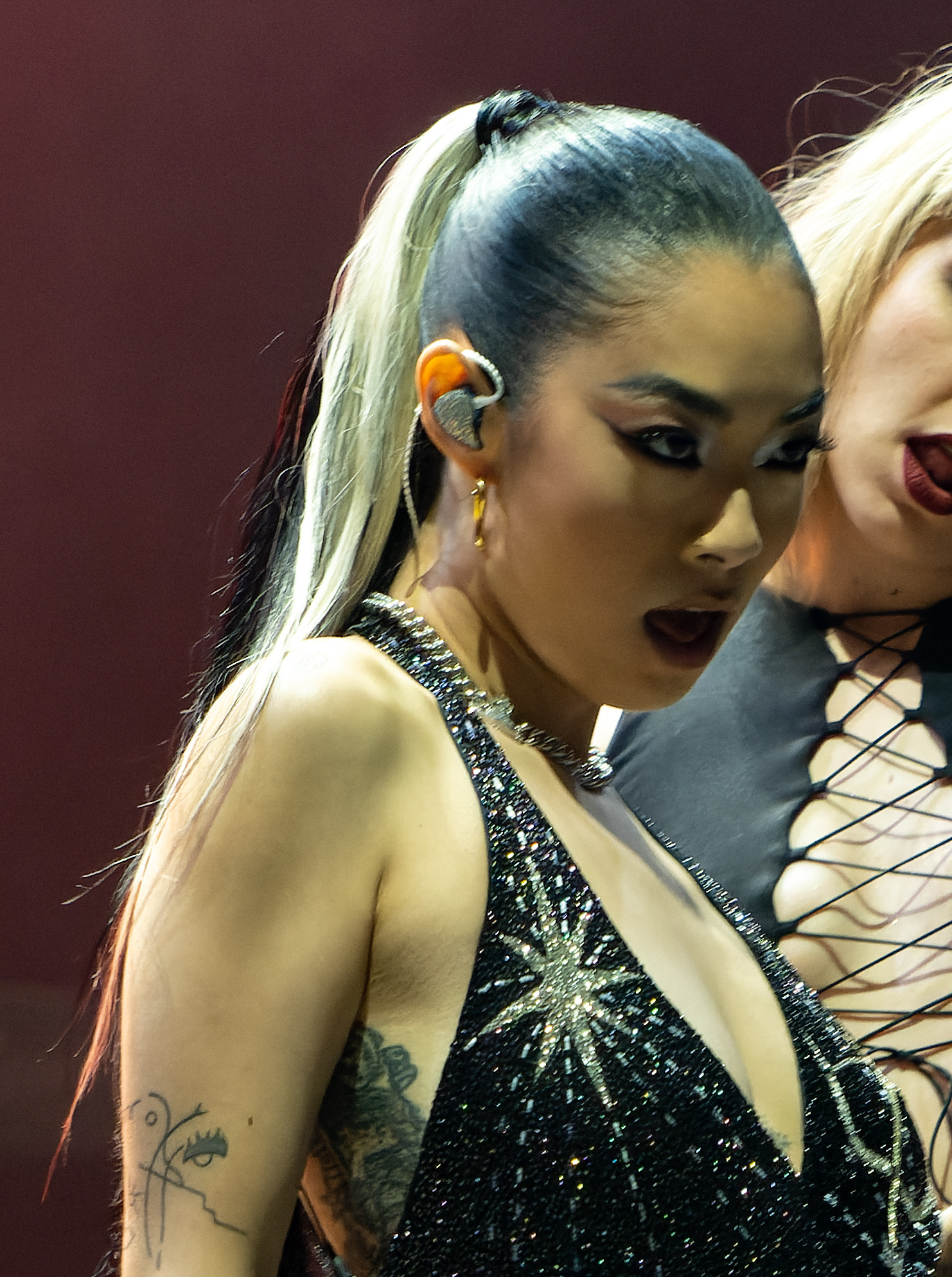
- Sawayama performing at Primavera Sound in 2022
- Born: 16 August 1990 (age 36); Niigata, Japan
- Education: Magdalene College, Cambridge (BA)
- Occupations: Singer; actress; model
- Years active: 2013–present
- Works: Discography; live performances
- Musical career
- Origin: London, England
- Genres: Pop; rock; R&B
- Instruments: Vocals; guitar; harmonica; flute
- Labels: Dirty Hit; Make Mine; House of Us; The Vinyl Factory; 88rising; 12Tone; Different
- Website: rina.online

Rina Sawayama (Japanese: リナ・サワヤマ; born 16 August 1990) is a Japanese and British singer, actress, and model. Born in Niigata, Japan, she emigrated to London with her parents at the age of five. In 2017, she self-released her debut extended play, Rina. After signing to Dirty Hit in 2020, she released her debut studio album, Sawayama, to critical acclaim. Her second studio album, Hold the Girl, was released on 16 September 2022. Known for her musical versatility, and integration of feminism into her craft, Sawayama has also modelled for fashion campaigns, and made her film acting debut in the action film John Wick: Chapter 4 (2023).

== Early life ==
Sawayama was born on 16 August 1990 in Niigata, Japan. She lived there until the age of five when her family moved to London, where she was raised and currently resides. She has indefinite leave to remain (ILR) in the UK. According to Sawayama, the family's plan was to return to Japan when she turned ten, but they chose to stay in London. Due to her inability to communicate in English, Sawayama struggled to understand her teachers and peers. She eventually connected with others through pop music. While she began adjusting to her life in London, Sawayama attempted to "preserve" her Japanese culture by indulging in it which she said included listening to musical acts such as Hikaru Utada and Morning Musume. Her parents divorced when she was 10 years old, and Sawayama remained with her mother in London.

At the age of 16, she began posting music covers on Myspace, and during sixth form she formed a hip hop group called Lazy Lion. In a September 2023 interview with BBC News, Sawayama said that she had been sexually groomed by a school teacher when she was 17. She subsequently underwent sex and relationship therapy for the trauma. Sawayama went on to cover the experience in second studio album, Hold the Girl, particularly in the song "Your Age".

Sawayama attended Magdalene College, Cambridge where she studied politics, psychology and sociology. She graduated from the university with a degree in political science.

== Career ==
=== 2013–2016: Early career ===
Sawayama began her solo career in February 2013, with the single "Sleeping in Waking", produced by Justin "Hoost" Tailor. A 7-inch vinyl of the single, featuring a new song titled "Who?" as the B-side, was released in April 2013 through UK label Make Mine. Later that year, she released the single "Terror" on Halloween under the stage name of "Riina". Sawayama would later reveal in a 2021 Billboard interview that the reason she used only her first name is because her last name was "an inconvenience".

In June 2015, she released a music video, directed by Arvida Byström, to her track "Tunnel Vision". In 2016, she released the single "Where U Are", with an accompanying music video co-directed by Alessandra Kurr. The single explored human interaction with digital media, with Sawayama explaining: "Online, you can present your best edited self [and] your overheating phone substitutes human warmth. Weirdest of all – you're together, but also very alone." The song has been described as "nostalgic greatness… ultra-sweet and shimmering pop", and "90s R&B pop perfection".

=== 2017–2020: Rina and Sawayama ===
In March 2017, her single "Cyber Stockholm Syndrome" premiered on The Fader. Sawayama described the genesis of the themes of the track as: "the digital world can offer vital support networks, voices of solidarity, refuge, escape. That's what 'Cyber Stockholm Syndrome' is about: pessimism, optimism, anxiety, and freedom."

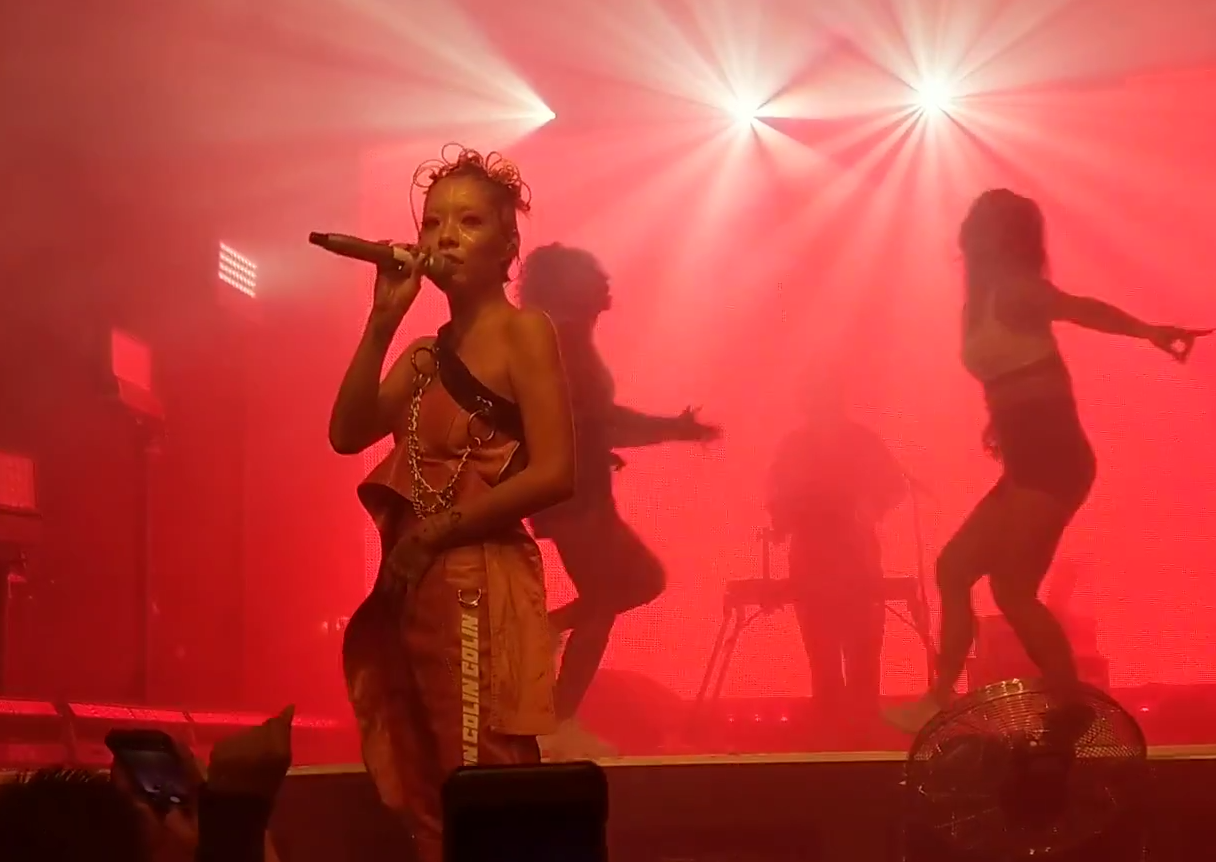
Sawayama at Heaven nightclub in 2018

In 2017, the singles "Alterlife" and "Tunnel Vision", a duet with Shamir, were released, followed by her debut EP, Rina. Sawayama was then an unsigned artist, and Rina was released independently; she confirmed on Twitter that she worked for two to three years to save money to release the EP. The Guardian deemed the EP "bracing and modern", stating that Sawayama had proven "she can shepherd pop into the future, too". Pitchfork ranked Rina in its list of best pop and R&B albums of the year. In 2018, Sawayama released the single "Valentine" on Valentine's Day. The music video for the track "Ordinary Superstar" was released in June 2018. In August 2018, Sawayama released the track "Cherry", in which she explores her sexual identity. Sawayama embarked on her Ordinary Superstar Tour across the UK, the US and Canada in late 2018. In 2019, she performed as the supporting act for Charli XCX's tour across the UK. That same year, she acted in the comedy series Turn Up Charlie.

In 2020, after signing to Dirty Hit records, Sawayama released the singles "STFU!", a nu-metal, heavy metal, pop and avant-pop song, and "Comme des Garçons (Like the Boys)", a "homage to early 2000s dance tracks", both from her then-upcoming debut album. A third single, the rock and 2000s R&B-inspired "XS", was released on 2 March. The following month, Sawayama released another single from the album titled "Chosen Family". Her debut album, Sawayama, was released on 17 April to widespread critical acclaim. In June 2020, she released a cover of "Dance in the Dark" by Lady Gaga as part of Spotify's Singles series. The song was recorded in Sawayama's home studio, her version replacing the Europop sound of the original song with nu-metal-influenced electropop. The album and aforementioned song was primarily produced by Clarence Clarity.

In late July 2020, Sawayama made a public tweet about her ineligibility to be nominated for major British music awards, such as the Mercury Prize and Brit Awards, due to the fact that she does not hold British citizenship. The hashtag "#SawayamaIsBritish" became trending on Twitter in the UK shortly after. Sawayama's movement gained major support from Elton John online, who wrote that he was "happy to hear that the [BPI] are reviewing the rules that led to Rina Sawayama's well-deserved album being snubbed from this year's [Mercury Prize] list of nominees." The British Phonographic Industry (BPI) later changed the rules to allow anyone who had remained in the UK, including her, to be eligible. On 26 October 2020, Sawayama made her television debut performing the song "XS" on The Tonight Show Starring Jimmy Fallon. The following month, she released a song titled "Lucid", produced by BloodPop. On 4 December 2020, a deluxe version of Sawayama was released.

=== 2021–present: Hold the Girl and acting ===
In April 2021, Sawayama released an updated version of her song "Chosen Family", as a duet with Elton John. In August 2021, Sawayama was included on Newsweek Japan "100 Japanese people respected by the world" list. Sawayama contributed a cover of the Metallica song "Enter Sandman" to the charity tribute album The Metallica Blacklist, released in September 2021. On 3 September 2021, a remix version of Lady Gaga's "Free Woman" by Clarence Clarity and Sawayama appeared on Gaga's remix album Dawn of Chromatica.

Sawayama started working on her second studio album in 2021. In November 2021, she embarked on the first leg of The Dynasty Tour in support of Sawayama. She featured on the single "Beg for You" by Charli XCX, released on 27 January 2022 and later on "Follow Me" by Brazilian drag queen Pabllo Vittar, released on 31 March of the same year. On 16 May, Sawayama announced that her second studio album, Hold the Girl, would release in September 2022. Its lead single "This Hell" was released on 18 May. "Catch Me in the Air" was released as the second single from the album on 27 June. The title track "Hold the Girl" was released as the album's third single on 27 July. On 25 August, "Phantom" was released as another single from the album. On 12 September, the final single from the album, titled "Hurricanes", was released.

Sawayama made her film acting debut in the fourth installment in the John Wick film series. The film was released in March 2023, receiving positive reviews. Sawayama also released the song "An Eye for An Eye", which appears in the film. She is expected to reprise her role in a spin-off film, for which production is scheduled for April 2026.

== Other ventures ==
=== Modelling career ===
Sawayama is signed to Anti-Agency and Elite Model Management. In 2017, she was chosen for Versus x Versace's fall/winter campaign. She has also starred in campaigns for Jourdan Dunn's Missguided, and wrote and performed an original track titled "Play on Me" for Nicola Formichetti's MAC x Nicopanda. In September 2021, she walked the runway for Balmain to celebrate the ten-year anniversary of Olivier Rousteing being the head of the French House. Sawayama was featured on the cover of British Vogue in June 2023.

=== Collaborations ===
In 2016, Sawayama collaborated with Taiwanese visual artist, John Yuyi, on a visual series critiquing East Asian, including Japanese, beauty standards. Subsequently, she was profiled in Vogue. In the interview, Sawayama described the genesis of the idea and collaboration: "For a lot of women in Japan, these are the expectations people put on them, from anime culture, kawaii culture… that can really put women at a disadvantage, objectifying and infantilising them." Sawayama has worked with Nicola Formichetti for MAC x Nicopanda. Formichetti also directed the music video for Sawayama's track "Ordinary Superstar". The genesis of the partnership was outlined in i-D.

== Artistry ==
Sawayama has said that she began singing after her family engaged heavily in karaoke and first sang "Automatic" by Hikaru Utada in front of her parents as its music video aired on television. She cited Utada as the reason she "started doing music." She has mentioned Madonna as a "huge inspiration" to her. Sawayama also frequently cites Lady Gaga as an inspiration and began using her vocal technique bel canto after researching her singing techniques. She has been described by music critics as a soprano. She listed Aretha Franklin, Beyoncé, Janelle Monáe, Alicia Keys and Karen O as vocalists she admires. At the age of twelve, Sawayama convinced her father to give her a guitar after she began listening to Avril Lavigne and taught herself to play chords on it. She subsequently began writing songs after doing so. Other influences Sawayama cite include: Christina Aguilera, Britney Spears, Evanescence, Sugababes, NSYNC, Justin Timberlake, Kylie Minogue, Limp Bizkit, Destiny’s Child, Girls Aloud, Pink, Ringo Sheena and Taylor Swift, among others.

== Feminism ==
Scholars June Kuoch and Allegro Wang said of Sawayama's craft that it challenges, "the white hegemonic masculine gaze" through Sawayama's lyrics, performances and delivery. Sawayama's incorporation of feminist themes is a recognition that, "pop music is a distinctly feminized genre and therefore, is imbued with the politics and positionality of women within a song or album’s respective moment in culture and history".

Sawayama has been vocal about the importance of feminism in the music industry, noting that "misogyny and abuse in the music industry" is rampant following complications regarding the ownership of her masters and therefore release of new music in the year 2023 and onward.

In 2017, Sawayama criticized pop-star Madonna for casting East Asian women as nail salon employees, noting that Madonna chose to portray them as, "silent stereotypical accessories to her overpriced skin care line".

On the music industry’s competitive nature, Sawayama has commented, "it's silly" that female musicians are pitted against one another, and would prefer the industry to be an all-inclusive space.

== Public image and personal life ==
In August 2018, Sawayama came out during an interview with Broadly, declaring: "I've always written songs about girls. I don't think I've ever mentioned a guy in my songs, and that's why I wanted to talk about it." She identifies as pansexual.

In July 2020, she signed an open letter to the UK Equalities minister Liz Truss calling for a ban on all forms of LGBT+ conversion therapy.

In a September 2022 interview with Them, Sawayama mentioned that she has IBS.

In 2017, Sawayama was ranked in The Guardian's "18 for '18" list as well as Dazed's "100 people shaping culture in 2017" list. Lady Gaga described Sawayama as "an experimental pop visionary who refuses to play by the rules".

In September 2025, Sawayama joined the "No Music for Genocide" boycott to geo-block her music from music streaming platforms in Israel in protest of the Gaza genocide.

== Filmography ==
=== Film ===
Year	Title	Role	Notes	Ref.
2023	John Wick: Chapter 4	Shimazu Akira	Film debut	
TBA	Caine	Shimazu Akira	Filming	

=== Television ===
Year	Title	Role	Notes	Ref.
2019	Turn Up Charlie	Layla Valentine	2 episodes	
TBA	Prodigies	Hana	Recurring role	

== Discography ==
- Sawayama (2020)
- Hold the Girl (2022)

== Awards and nominations ==
Organisation	Year	Category	Nominated work	Result	Ref.
AIM Independent Music Awards	2021	International Breakthrough	Herself	Nominated	
AIM Independent Music Awards	2022	Innovator Award	Herself	Won	
AIM Independent Music Awards	2023	Best Independent Album	Hold the Girl	Nominated	
Attitude Awards	2020	Breakthrough Award	Herself	Won	
Best Art Vinyl	2022	Best Vinyl Art	Hold the Girl	Nominated	
BRIT Awards	2021	Rising Star	Herself	Nominated	
BRIT Awards	2023	Best New Artist	Herself	Nominated	
BreakTudo Awards	2021	Asian Star	Herself	Nominated	
British LGBT Awards	2021	Best Music Artist	Herself	Nominated	
Critics' Choice Super Awards	2024	Best Actress in an Action Movie	John Wick: Chapter 4	Nominated	
Denmark Gaffa Awards	2021	Best International New Act	Herself	Nominated	
Denmark Gaffa Awards	2021	Best International Solo Act	Herself	Nominated	
Denmark Gaffa Awards	2021	Best International Album	Sawayama	Nominated	
Denmark Gaffa Awards	2022	Best International New Act	Herself	Nominated	
Gay Times Honours	2021	British Excellence in Music	Herself	Won	
Golden Indie Music Awards	2020	Asian Songwriter Award	Herself	Nominated	
GLAAD Media Awards	2021	Outstanding Breakthrough Artist	Sawayama	Nominated	
GLAAD Media Awards	2023	Outstanding Music Artist	Hold the Girl	Nominated	
Independent Music Companies Association	2020	European Independent Album of the Year	Sawayama	Nominated	
Libera Awards	2023	Best Pop Record	Hold the Girl	Nominated	
MTV Video Music Awards	2022	Video for Good	"This Hell"	Nominated	
Music Week Awards	2021	Artist Marketing Campaign	Herself	Nominated	
Music Week Awards	2023	Artist Marketing Campaign	Herself	Nominated	
Music Week Women In Music Awards	2021	New Artist	Herself	Won	
NME Awards	2022	Best Solo Act in the World	Herself	Nominated	
NME Awards	2022	Best Solo Act from the UK	Herself	Nominated	
NME Awards	2022	Best Live Act	Herself	Won	
NME Awards	2022	Best Collaboration	"Chosen Family" (with Elton John)	Nominated	
Popjustice £20 Music Prize	2022	Best British Pop Single	"This Hell"	Nominated	
Rober Awards Music Prize	2020	Best New Artist	Herself	Won	
Rober Awards Music Prize	2020	Best Pop Artist	Herself	Nominated	
Rober Awards Music Prize	2020	Song of the Year	"XS"	Nominated	
Rober Awards Music Prize	2020	Best Music Video	"Bad Friend"	Nominated	
The Daily Californian Art Awards	2020	Best International Album	Sawayama	Won	
Vogue Japan	2019	Women of the Year	Herself	Won	

== Tours ==
=== Headlining ===
- Ordinary Superstar Tour (2018)
- The Dynasty Tour (2021–2022)
- Hold the Girl Tour (2022–2023)
- Hold the Girl Reloaded Tour (2023)

=== Supporting ===
- Palo Santo Tour (with Years & Years) (2018)
- Charli Live Tour (with Charli XCX) (2019)
