= Rina (EP) =

EP by Rina Sawayama
- Released: 27 October 2017
- Genre: Pop; R&B; avant-pop; avant-garde
- Length: 24:53
- Producer: Clarence Clarity; Justin Tailor

Rina Sawayama chronology
Rina (2017)	Sawayama (2020)

Singles from Rina
- 1. "Cyber Stockholm Syndrome" Released: 17 March 2017; 2. "Alterlife" Released: 21 September 2017; 3. "Tunnel Vision" Released: 24 October 2017; 4. "Ordinary Superstar" Released: 5 June 2018

Rina (stylised in all caps) is the debut extended play by Japanese singer-songwriter Rina Sawayama. Also described as a mini-album, Rina was independently released on 27 October 2017. Sawayama funded the album herself, working "2–3 jobs at a time for years" to save enough to release the EP. Sawayama promoted the album through the Ordinary Superstar Tour in 2018.

== Critical reception ==
Professional ratings
Review scores
Source	Rating
The Guardian	4/5 stars
The Line of Best Fit	8.5/10

Rachel Aroesti of The Guardian called the EP "nostalgic" and capable of "shepard[ing] pop into the future." She praised "Alterlife" as a highlight and called it a "double-speed power ballad, replete with twinkling synths and an industrial guitar riff" and compared it to Grimes' 2015 album Art Angels. She also compared "Ordinary Superstar" to Britney Spears and Hannah Montana, with the former exerting heavy influence over the EP as a whole. Saam Idelji-Tehrani of The Line of Best Fit also praised Rina, saying "Although Sawayama's mini-album is one laced with nostalgia, she intelligently uses 90s pop and R&B as a canvas to paint 21st Century missives on internet addiction, alter-ego dependence and the gratification found through web-based validation." Idelji-Tehrani compared "Take Me As I Am" to "NSYNC-inspired power pop" and "Cyber Stockholm Syndrome" to Butterfly-era Mariah Carey.

In their list of the Top 20 Best Pop and R&B albums of 2017, Pitchfork ranked the album at number 19 and praised Sawayama for her wide array of influences including experimental J-pop, Neptunes, Britney Spears, and synthwave, saying she has "a knack for them all". Dazed also ranked Rina as the 10th best album of 2017.

== Track listing ==
All songs were written by Rina Sawayama and Clarence Clarity, except where noted. All production was done by Clarence Clarity, except where noted.

Rina track listing
No.	Title	Writer(s)	Producer(s)	Length
1.	"Ordinary Superstar"			3:47
2.	"Take Me as I Am"			3:26
3.	"10-20-40"			3:15
4.	"Tunnel Vision" (featuring Shamir)	Sawayama; Justin Tailor; Shamir Bailey	Tailor	3:36
5.	"Time Out" (Interlude)			1:00
6.	"Alterlife"			4:04
7.	"Through the Wire" (Interlude)	Sawayama; Tailor	Tailor	2:03
8.	"Cyber Stockholm Syndrome"	Sawayama; Clarity; Tailor	Clarity; Tailor	3:42
Total length:				24:53

== Charts ==
Chart (2017)	Peak position
Japan Download Albums (Billboard Japan)	40
