= Lucid (song) =

2020 single by Rina Sawayama

Single by Rina Sawayama

from the album Sawayama (Deluxe)
- Written: 2018
- Released: 25 November 2020
- Genre: House; dance-pop
- Length: 3:38
- Label: Dirty Hit
- Songwriters: BloodPop; Lauren Aquilina; Rina Sawayama
- Producer: BloodPop

Rina Sawayama singles chronology
"Dance in the Dark" (2020)	"Lucid" (2020)	"Beg for You" (2022)

Music video
- "Lucid" on YouTube

"Lucid" (stylised in all caps) is a song by Japanese-British singer-songwriter Rina Sawayama, released on 25 November 2020 as the sixth overall and first single from the deluxe edition of her debut studio album Sawayama. Sawayama first teased a collaboration with BloodPop on 2 October 2020, Tweeting out "BloodPop X Rina Sawayama Coming Soon" alongside a Polaroid picture with the words "Lucid Mix" written on it.

== Background and composition ==
The dance-pop song is about "living a different life through dreaming". It was written by Sawayama and Lauren Aquilina in 2018 on the floor of the singer's apartment from a beat sent to them by BloodPop. The song has been described as "Gaga-esque" and garnered comparisons to the singer's 2020 album Chromatica, also produced by BloodPop.

== Music video ==
The video was directed by Dave Ferner and Ksenia Kulakova, and was filmed at MARS Studios, owned by Bild Studios, in London, with all staff observing COVID-19 protocols during production. The video was filmed using a virtual production set, with scenes created in Blender and filmed using an LED projection screen.

== In popular culture ==
The song was used in the third episode of the Netflix series Heartstopper and subsequently appeared on the Heartstopper: Official Mixtape released by Spotify.
