= XS (song) =

2020 single by Rina Sawayama

Single by Rina Sawayama

from the album Sawayama
- Released: 2 March 2020
- Recorded: 2019
- Genre: Avant-pop; electropop; pop rock; R&B
- Length: 3:21
- Label: Dirty Hit
- Songwriters: Kyle Shearer; Chris Lyon; Nate Campany; Rina Sawayama
- Producers: Kyle Shearer; Chris Lyon; Valley Girl

Rina Sawayama singles chronology
"Comme des Garçons (Like the Boys)" (2020)	"XS" (2020)	"Chosen Family" (2020)

Bree Runway singles chronology
"Damn Daniel" (2020)	"XS" (2020)	"Gucci" (2020)

Music video
- "XS" on YouTube

"XS" is a song by Japanese singer-songwriter Rina Sawayama, released on 2 March 2020, as the third single from her debut studio album, Sawayama, via the label Dirty Hit. An avant-pop, electropop, pop rock, and R&B tune with bubblegum pop influences, its lyrics criticise capitalism in the face of climate change.

"XS" received critical acclaim for its anti-capitalist lyrics and drew comparisons to the music of the 1990s and 2000s. It was also included on several end-of-year song lists in 2020. A remix featuring English singer Bree Runway was released on 10 July 2020.

== Background and composition ==
Sawayama said in a statement that "XS" is a song that "mocks capitalism in a sinking world":

"Given that we all know global climate change is accelerating and human extinction is a very real possibility within our lifetime it seemed hilarious to me that brands were still coming out with new makeup palettes every month and public figures were doing a gigantic house tour of their gated property in Calabasas in the same week as doing a ‘sad about Australian wild fires’ Instagram post. I mean I’m guilty of turning a blind eye too, because otherwise it makes me depressed. We’re all hypocrites because we are all capitalists, and it’s a trap that I don’t see us getting out of. I wanted to reflect the chaos of this post-truth climate change denying world in the metal guitar stabs that flare up like an underlying zit between the 2000s R&B beat that reminds you of a time when everything was alright."

"XS" is a 1990s- and 2000s-inspired pop, avant-pop, electropop, R&B-nu metal, pop rock, and R&B song with "upbeat bubblegum pop vibes". It is composed in the key of D minor with a tempo of 117 beats per minute. "XS" begins with an "eerie" buildup of violins, while a "shredding" guitar riff appears before and after the chorus. The song's use of acoustic guitars drew comparisons to Justin Timberlake's "Like I Love You".

== Reception ==
"XS" was well-received. While reviewing Sawayama's second album Hold the Girl, Cat Zhang of Pitchfork named "XS" her debut album's best song, commenting that "[the song] was intended as arch anti-capitalist critique in an age of climate crisis, but its luxe vision was a better sell for being the rich, not eating them; Sawayama whispered 'excess' as if it were the name of a designer perfume, the scent of 'more' intoxicating."

"XS" was listed on several end-of-year lists from 2020, including those from Billboard, DIY, NME, and Slate.

Critics' rankings for "XS"
Publication	Accolade	Rank	Ref.
Billboard	The 20 Best LGBTQ Songs of 2020	—N/a	
Billboard	The 30 Best Pop Songs of 2020: Staff Picks	—N/a	
Dazed	The 20 best tracks of 2020	4	
DIY	DIY's Tracks of 2020	8	
The Guardian	The 20 Best Songs of 2020	10	
The Line of Best Fit	The Best Songs of 2020 Ranked	3	
NME	The 50 best songs of 2020	7	
Our Culture Mag	The 25 Best Songs of 2020	18	
Slate	The Best Albums of 2020 Plus Best Songs	—N/a	

== Music video ==
The music video for "XS" was uploaded on YouTube on 17 April 2020, the same day as Sawayama's self-titled debut album was released. It currently has over 11 million views, making it the most-viewed video on Sawayama's channel. It was directed by Ali Kurr, who had also previously directed the music video for her other single, "STFU!".

In the video, Sawayama portrays a "QVC-like" "robotic" saleswoman who attends a shopping channel broadcast to promote a beverage named "RINA Water", which consists 99% of 24-karat gold and 1% of plasma. Later it is revealed that the liquid is extracted from a creature which is chained in an underground factory.

== Live performance ==
On 26 October 2020, Sawayama gave her first televised performance ever on The Tonight Show Starring Jimmy Fallon, where she performed "XS".

== Track listing ==
- Digital download/streaming
1. "XS" – 3:21
- Digital download/streaming – Bree Runway Remix
1. "XS" (Bree Runway Remix) – 3:22
