= Sawayama =

2020 studio album by Rina Sawayama

- Digital cover. The cover of the physical edition features the title on the image's upper side.

Studio album by Rina Sawayama
- Released: 17 April 2020
- Recorded: 2018–2019
- Studios: Heavy Duty Studios (Los Angeles); DH00270 (London); Shelter Studios (London)
- Genres: Pop; nu metal; rock; R&B; dance-pop
- Length: 43:34
- Languages: English; Japanese
- Labels: Dirty Hit; Avex Trax
- Producers: Clarence Clarity; Chris Lyon; Bram Inscore; Danny L Harle; Rina Sawayama; Jonathan Gilmore; Kyle Shearer

Rina Sawayama chronology
Rina (2017)	Sawayama (2020)	Sawayama Remixed (2020)

Singles from Sawayama
- 1. "STFU!" Released: 22 November 2019; 2. "Comme des Garçons (Like the Boys)" Released: 17 January 2020; 3. "XS" Released: 2 March 2020; 4. "Chosen Family" Released: 3 April 2020; 5. "Bad Friend" Released: 15 April 2020

Sawayama is the debut studio album by Japanese and British singer Rina Sawayama. It was released on 17 April 2020 by Dirty Hit. The follow-up to her self-released debut EP Rina (2017), it received widespread acclaim from music critics, specifically towards the wide variety of music genres used, as well as its Y2K nostalgia and "intelligent" nature. Described by Sawayama herself as being "about family and identity", she lyrically explores personal experiences from both her childhood and adulthood.

Sawayama was primarily produced by Clarence Clarity and written by Sawayama, with additional work from musicians such as Danny L Harle, Kyle Shearer, Jonathan Gilmore, Bram Inscore and Lauren Aquilina among others. Musically, the album is influenced by 2000s mainstream pop, nu metal, rock, R&B, and dance-pop among other genres.

== Background and composition ==
Sawayama was recorded in London and Los Angeles. The artist herself stated in a press release that the album "is about family and identity. It's about understanding yourself in the context of two opposing cultures (for me British and Japanese), what "belonging" means when home is an evolving concept, figuring out where you sit comfortably within and awkwardly outside of stereotypes, and ultimately trying to be ok with just being you, warts and all."

Musically, Sawayama is produced, performed and recorded in a wide variety of genres. Primarily influenced by 2000s mainstream pop, nu metal, rock, R&B, and dance-pop, it also was noted by critics to include elements of arena rock, EDM, avant-pop, hyperpop, electro, art pop, house, hair metal, hip-hop, experimental, synth-pop, bubblegum pop, emo pop, grunge, industrial, dubstep, country pop, pop rock, gospel, glam rock, trap, trip hop, folk, J-pop and electro-dub.

== Promotion ==
=== Singles ===
"STFU!" was released as the lead single to the then-unannounced album on 21 November 2019. It is a nu metal track and represents a change in direction for Sawayama. The song premiered alongside the music video, which was co-directed by Ali Kurr and Sawayama herself. The single was met with critical acclaim, achieving a score of 82 on the website Album of the Year (based on both Critic and User reviews). It was inspired by "a cascade of microaggressions" with a message that "Asian women should not be cast as quiet and subservient."

"Comme des Garçons (Like the Boys)" was released as the second single to the album, along with the album pre-order, on 17 January 2020. It is a dance track written about female empowerment and the "rejection of traditional masculinity" by gay men. A remix of the track was released a month later, on 21 February 2020, featuring Brazilian drag queen Pabllo Vittar and a new mix by Brabo. A music video featuring the original mix of the song was released on 26 February 2020.

"XS" was released as the album's third official single on 2 March 2020. Sawayama stated that the track "is a song that mocks capitalism in a sinking world. Given that we all know global climate change is accelerating and human extinction is a very real possibility within our lifetime it seemed hilarious to me that brands were still coming out with new makeup palettes every month and public figures were doing a gigantic house tour of their gated property in Calabasas in the same week as doing a 'sad about Australian wildfires' Instagram post." This song received positive reviews, with Sofia Meyers of Euphoria stating that "if this is the direction she is going in, we're all in for what's next." A music video for the track was released on 17 April 2020. On 10 July 2020, the remix of the song came out in collaboration with the musician Bree Runway, with the difference that the introduction is a little different from the original and the verse from Bree Runway replaces the second from the original version.

"Chosen Family" was released as the album's fourth single on 3 April 2020. Prior to the single's release, Sawayama leaked its chords and lyrics so that fans create their own versions of the track. She also released a video featuring her favourite fan made versions of the track as well as a tutorial of how to play the song on the guitar.

"Bad Friend" was released as the fifth single from the record on 15 April 2020, two days before the album's release. Sawayama herself has described the track as her favourite from the album and stated that it was written after she found out through social media that her formerly close friend had just had a baby. The music video was released in May.

=== Tour ===
In January 2020, Sawayama announced through her social media The Dynasty Tour, her second concert series, with dates in North America and Europe. Due to safety concerns over the COVID-19 pandemic, the tour dates were rescheduled to 2021. The tour began on 8 November 2021, in Dublin, Ireland, and concluded on 13 May 2022, in New York City. American singer and DJ Hana and London-based singer Ama Jones served as opening acts for the first leg of the tour.

== Critical reception ==
Professional ratings
Aggregate scores
Source	Rating
AnyDecentMusic?	8.3/10
Metacritic	89/100
Review scores
Source	Rating
AllMusic	4/5 stars
Clash	9/10
Consequence of Sound	A−
DIY	4/5 stars
The Independent	4/5 stars
The Line of Best Fit	9/10
NME	5/5 stars
Pitchfork	7.7/10
Q	5/5 stars
Rolling Stone	4/5 stars

Sawayama garnered widespread critical acclaim from music critics and listeners alike. At Metacritic, which assigns a normalised rating out of 100 based on reviews from mainstream critics, the album received a score of 89 out of 100, based on reviews from 14 critics, indicating "universal acclaim". The album was rated an 8.3 out of 10 on the aggregator AnyDecentMusic?.

The Line of Best Fit writer Erin Bashford called it a "deftly intelligent record [that] takes personal and musical themes, and presents them in a way that doesn't feel like it's ever been done before". She also praised Sawayama's "strong and emotional vocals" and "tak[ing] motifs and styles from every genre and era and curat[ing] something that feels futuristic", summing up her review by stating "Rina Sawayama is one-of-a-kind, and her debut album certainly isn't going to be quiet about that". NME complimented Sawayama for being "an exciting first step from an artist unafraid to push pop into new realms". Writing for Pitchfork, Katherine St. Asaph described Sawayama as "a Y2K flashback that’s as reverent of Evanescence and Korn as it is of Britney and Christina." In June 2020, Elton John called the album "the strongest album of the year so far" and regarded the song "Bad Friend" as one that "Madonna would die for." Tom Hull was less impressed, giving it a B-minus and saying the "music aims for arena rock, sometimes with a bit of dissonance, but that doesn't help either."

=== Year-end lists ===
Select rankings for Sawayama
Publication	Accolade	Rank	Ref.
Billboard	Top 50 Best Albums of 2020	20	
Consequence of Sound	The 50 Best Albums of 2020	13	
Gigwise	The Gigwise 51 Best Albums of 2020	1	
The Guardian	The 50 best albums of 2020	3	
The Line of Best Fit	The Best Albums of 2020 Ranked	1	
The New York Times	Best Albums of 2020 (Jon Caramanica's list)	2	
NME	The 50 Best Albums of 2020	7	
Paste	The 50 Best Albums of 2020	8	
The Skinny	Top 10 Albums of 2020	5	
USA Today	The 10 best albums of 2020	2	

== Track listing ==
Sawayama – standard edition
No.	Title	Writer(s)	Producer(s)	Length
1.	"Dynasty"	Rina Sawayama; Adam Crisp	Sawayama; Clarence Clarity; Jonathan Gilmore	3:08
2.	"XS"	Sawayama; Nathaniel Campany; Kyle Shearer; Christopher Lyon	Sawayama; Clarity; Valley Girl; Lyon	3:21
3.	"STFU!"	Sawayama; Crisp	Clarity	3:23
4.	"Comme des Garçons (Like the Boys)"	Sawayama; Nicole Morier; Bram Inscore	Inscore	3:01
5.	"Akasaka Sad"	Sawayama; Crisp	Sawayama; Clarity	3:02
6.	"Paradisin'"	Sawayama; Crisp	Sawayama; Clarity	3:06
7.	"Love Me 4 Me"	Sawayama; Morier; Inscore	Clarity	3:12
8.	"Bad Friend"	Sawayama; Jonny Lattimer	Sawayama; Gilmore; Shearer	3:28
9.	"Fuck This World (Interlude)"	Sawayama; Crisp	Sawayama; Clarity	2:45
10.	"Who's Gonna Save U Now?"	Sawayama; Lattimer; Richard Cooper	Sawayama; Clarity	3:21
11.	"Tokyo Love Hotel"	Sawayama; Lauren Aquilina; Oscar Scheller	Clarity	4:27
12.	"Chosen Family"	Sawayama	Danny L Harle	4:08
13.	"Snakeskin"	Sawayama; Crisp; Lattimer	Sawayama; Clarity	3:12
Total length:				43:34

Sawayama – Japanese edition (bonus track)
No.	Title	Writer(s)	Producer(s)	Length
14.	"Tokyo Takeover"	Sawayama; Justin Tailor	Sawayama	3:27
Total length:				47:01

Deluxe edition bonus disc
No.	Title	Writer(s)	Producer(s)	Length
1.	"Lucid"	Sawayama; Aquilina; Michael Tucker	BloodPop	3:38
2.	"Chosen Family" (with Elton John) (vinyl and non-Japanese digital reissue)	Sawayama; Harle; Lattimer	Harle	4:40
3.	"We Out Here"	Sawayama; Crisp	Clarity	2:57
4.	"Bees & Honey"	Sawayama; Morier; Inscore	Inscore	1:47
5.	"Love It If We Made It" (The 1975 cover)	Matthew Healy; George Daniel; Adam Hann; Ross MacDonald	Clarity	4:04
6.	"XS" (live)	Sawayama; Campany; Shearer; Lyon	Sawayama; Gilmore	3:43
7.	"STFU!" (acoustic)	Sawayama; Crisp	Joseph Rodgers	3:33
8.	"Bad Friend" (acoustic)	Sawayama; Lattimer	Rodgers	3:29
9.	"Chosen Family" (acoustic)	Sawayama	Rodgers	4:06
10.	"Comme des Garçons (Like the Boys)" (Brabo Remix) (featuring Pabllo Vittar)	Sawayama; Morier; Inscore; Phabullo Silva	Inscore	3:42
11.	"XS" (Remix) (featuring Bree Runway)	Sawayama; Campany; Shearer; Lyon; Brenda Mensah	Sawayama; Shearer; Lyon; Clarity; Valley Girl	3:23
12.	"Bad Friend" (Dream Wife Remix)	Sawayama; Lattimer	Sawayama; Shearer; Gilmore; Ryan Harvey; Clarity	4:14
Total length:				1:26:57

Japanese CD deluxe edition bonus track
No.	Title	Writer(s)	Length
13.	"Bad Friend" (End of the World Remix)	Sawayama; Lattimer	3:14
Total length:			1:33:38

Japanese deluxe edition bonus Blu-ray Disc
No.	Title	Length
1.	"XS" (Music Video)	3:39
2.	"STFU!" (Music Video)	6:20
3.	"Comme des Garçons (Like the Boys)" (Music Video)	3:04
4.	"Bad Friend" (Music Video)	3:39
5.	"Lucid" (Extended Reality Video)	4:12
6.	"Bad Friend" (End of the World Remix)	3:15
7.	"Chosen Family (with Elton John)" (Music Video)	4:46
8.	"Chosen Family" (Live Performance Video)

- As of April 2024, "Tokyo Takeover", "Chosen Family (with Elton John)", and "Love It If We Made It" have been removed region-wide from digital releases of the album.

Sample credit

- "Snakeskin" samples Japanese video game Final Fantasy IV's "Fanfare", composed by Nobuo Uematsu (1991).

== Personnel ==
Credits adapted from the album's liner notes.

Musicians

- London Community Gospel Choir – choir vocals (1, 8, 10)
- Adam Hann – additional guitars (1, 2, 10)
- Freddy Sheed – additional drums (1, 2, 10)

Artwork

- Ben Ditto – creative direction
- Hendrik Schneider – photography
- Samuel Burgess-Johnson – layout
- Jack Westall – "Remixed" artwork

Technical

- Spike Stent – mixing (1–5, 7, 8, 10, 11)
- Tim Rowkins – mixer (2, 6, 9, 12, 13)
- Robin Schmidt – mastering
- Joseph Rodgers – additional engineering (1, 2, 8, 10)
- Jonathan Gilmore – additional engineering (1, 2, 10)
- Chloe Kraemer – additional engineering (7)

== Charts ==
Chart performance for Sawayama
Chart (2020–2021)	Peak position
Australian Vinyl Albums (ARIA)	20
Japan Download Albums (Billboard Japan)	65
Scottish Albums (Official Charts)	24
UK Albums (Official Charts)	80
UK Independent Albums (Official Charts)	5
US Top Current Album Sales (Billboard)	82
US Heatseekers Albums (Billboard)	6
US Independent Albums (Billboard)	43

== Sawayama Remixed ==
Sawayama Remixed

Remix album / Extended play by Rina Sawayama
- Released: 27 November 2020
- Length: 19:09
- Languages: English; Japanese
- Label: Dirty Hit
- Producers: Clarence Clarity; Jonathan Gilmore; Valley Girl; Ran Harvey; Bram Inscore; Chris Lyon; Rina Sawayama; Kyle Shearer

Rina Sawayama chronology
Sawayama (2020)	Sawayama Remixed (2020)	Hold the Girl (2022)

Singles from Sawayama Remixed
- 1. "Dance in the Dark" Released: 29 June 2020

Sawayama Remixed is a remix extended play by Japanese-British singer-songwriter Rina Sawayama. The limited edition set was released on 12-inch vinyl on 27 November 2020 via Rough Trade. The remixes of "XS" and "Comme des Garçons (Like the Boys)" had previously been released as singles earlier in the year and Sawayama's cover of "Dance in the Dark" was released as part of her Spotify Singles series.

=== Track listing ===
No.	Title	Writer(s)	Producer(s)	Length
1.	"Dance in the Dark" (Lady Gaga cover)	Fernando Garibay; Stefani Germanotta	Clarence Clarity	3:45
2.	"Love It If We Made It" (The 1975 cover)	Adam Hann; George Daniel; Ross MacDonald; Matty Healy	Clarity	4:04
3.	"Comme des Garçons (Like the Boys)" (Pabllo Vittar remix)	Rina Sawayama; Bram Inscore; Nicole Morier	Bram Inscore	3:42
4.	"XS" (Remix) (featuring Bree Runway)	Sawayama; Chris Lyon; Kyle Shearer; Nate Campany; Bree Runway	Shearer; Lyon; Clarity; Valley Girl	3:23
5.	"Bad Friend" (Dream Wife remix)	Sawayama; Jonny Lattimer	Sawayama; Shearer; Jonathan Gilmore; Ryan Harvey; Clarity	4:14
Total length:				19:09

== Release history ==
Release formats for Sawayama
Country	Date	Format	Version	Label	Ref.
Various	17 April 2020	Digital download; streaming; vinyl; CD	Standard	Dirty Hit	
Various	26 November 2020	cassette	Standard	Dirty Hit	
Various	27 November 2020	Vinyl	Remixes	Dirty Hit	
Various	4 December 2020	Digital download; streaming	Deluxe	Dirty Hit	
Various	4 December 2020	LP	Deluxe	Dirty Hit	
Japan	3 August 2022	CD; CD/Blu-ray	Deluxe	Avex Trax	
