= Arvida Byström =

Swedish artist (born 1991)

- Born: 4 October 1991 (age 34); Stockholm, Sweden
- Website: arvidabystrom.se

Arvida Byström (born 4 October 1991) is a Swedish photographer, model, and musician.

== Early life ==
Arvida Byström was born on 4 October 1991, near Stockholm. She grew up in Värmdö Municipality.

== Art and photography ==
Byström started taking pictures at age 12 with a digital camera, and took a lot of selfies to "know the truth about how the world sees you". Initially inspired by Tumblr, she started posting pictures on her account and taking part in a community of female artists questioning femininity and gender standards, using a so-called "girly" aesthetic and "girly coded stuff". Byström also took pictures about period-related things in the series There Will Be Blood, published in Vice, on 17 May 2012.

Byström then moved to London to become more independent. She made her first fashion series for Monki and created her own gallery space, GAL, with fellow photographer and friend Hanna Antonsson. Through GAL they curated emerging artists for one night shows. In spite of this, Byström still positioned herself as being more a part of popular culture than the art world.

As a member of the female collective The Ardorous, Byström presented some of her photographs in Babe – a book published in May 2015, including the work of 30 other female artists, curated by Petra Collins.

The same year, Byström took part in the exhibition Girls at Night on the Internet, curated by Grace Miceli, together with artists such as Collins, Molly Soda and Maggie Dunlap. The show dealt with the misrepresentation of young artists in the art world and showcased their work.

Byström created a performance with the artist Maja Malou Lyse, which was called Selfie stick Aerobics, a tutorial aimed to teach participants how to take better selfies while accepting their bodies to make them feel beautiful.

In 2017 Byström and Molly Soda released a book about Instagram censorship, called Pics or It Didn't Happen: Images Banned From Instagram.
