= Bad Friend (song) =

2020 single by Rina Sawayama

- End of the World Remix Cover

Single by Rina Sawayama

from the album Sawayama
- Released: 15 April 2020
- Recorded: October 2019
- Genre: Electropop; synth-pop
- Length: 3:28
- Label: Dirty Hit
- Songwriters: Rina Sawayama; Jonny Lattimer
- Producers: Rina Sawayama; Kyle Shearer; Jonathan Gilmore

Rina Sawayama singles chronology
"Chosen Family" (2020)	"Bad Friend" (2020)	"Dance in the Dark" (2020)

Music video
- "Bad Friend" on YouTube

"Bad Friend" is a song by Japanese singer-songwriter Rina Sawayama, released on 15 April 2020 as the fifth single from her debut studio album Sawayama, just two days before the album's release. A remix by End of the World was released on 20 November 2020. An electropop and synth-pop track, Sawayama stated that "Bad Friend" was written after she found out through social media that her formerly close friend had just had a baby.

== Composition ==
"Bad Friend" is a "gospel-laden" electropop and synth-pop ballad. It takes inspiration from "Bush-era pop" and the vocal manipulation styles of Imogen Heap. Channelling "the same heart-on-sleeve emotion as Stripped-era Christina Aguilera" the song features a choral bridge described as a "take 'em to church moment". The song indirectly references Carly Rae Jepsen's 2012 hit single "Call Me Maybe" when she discusses "singing our hearts out to Carly" in the summer of 2012. According to Sawayama, "Bad Friend" is about a deteriorating friendship during a trip to Tokyo and "how Westerners come to Tokyo and have a great time but can be very disrespectful to Japanese people". This ties the song in with the rest of the album's themes of family and cultural identity.

== Critical reception ==
Pitchfork placed the song at number 38 on their list of 100 best songs of 2020, with Dani Blum writing that on "Bad Friend", "Sawayama gives friend breakups their own ballad" while a "sense of shame courses through the track, undercutting her excuses". Blum felt that "relief doesn't come easy, but once it does, the song softens and shines". Elton John characterized "Bad Friend" as a "song that Madonna would die for", while simultaneously dubbing its parent album as the "strongest album of the year by far".

== Music video ==
The "Bad Friend" official music video was released in May 2020. The film noir-inspired visual was directed by Ali Kurr stars Sawayama in drag as an older Japanese businessman drowning his sorrows in a bar. There he meets another man who he befriends, but later ends up fighting.

== Track listing ==
Digital download

1. "Bad Friend" – 3:28

Digital download – End of the World remix

1. "Bad Friend" (End of the World Remix) – 3:15
