= Dance in the Dark =

2010 single by Lady Gaga

Single by Lady Gaga

from the EP The Fame Monster
- Released: July 26, 2010
- Studio: Metropolis (London)
- Genre: Europop
- Length: 4:49
- Label: Streamline; KonLive; Cherrytree; Interscope
- Songwriters: Lady Gaga; Fernando Garibay
- Producer: Fernando Garibay

Lady Gaga singles chronology
"Alejandro" (2010)	"Dance in the Dark" (2010)	"Born This Way" (2011)

Audio video
- "Dance in the Dark" on YouTube

"Dance in the Dark" is a song by American singer Lady Gaga from her third extended play (EP), The Fame Monster (2009)—the reissue of her debut studio album, The Fame (2008). She co-wrote the track with its producer Fernando Garibay. The lyrics are about a woman who prefers to have sex in the dark as she is insecure in her body. Having met such women while working on the MAC AIDS Fund, Gaga said that the song is not about freedom, but rather the assurance that she understood their feelings. A Europop track, it contains retro and new wave music influences, and begins with a stuttering introduction. It includes a spoken interlude, where Gaga lists famous dead people.

Interscope Records intended "Dance in the Dark" to be the third single from The Fame Monster, but Gaga insisted on "Alejandro", which was released in April 2010. Some months later, "Dance in the Dark" was issued to Australian and French radio, making it the EP's fourth and final single. Critics praised the song for its chorus and theme, although some found it a formulaic production. Retrospective reviewers ranked the song as one of Gaga's best. "Dance in the Dark" reached the top ten of charts in Poland, Hungary and Czech Republic, as well as the US Dance/Electronic Digital Song. It was nominated for a Grammy Award for Best Dance Recording.

Gaga performed "Dance in the Dark" as the opening song of the Monster Ball Tour. In the first leg of the tour, Gaga appeared behind a scrim-lit screen, and in the revamped shows, she performed it on a set reminiscent of a New York City night scene. Other events where she performed the song include the 2010 BRIT Awards—dedicated to Gaga's close friend, Alexander McQueen, who had committed suicide a few days earlier—and her Las Vegas residency, Enigma. A remix of the song appeared on her album The Remix (2010).

== Background and release ==
Lady Gaga and Fernando Garibay wrote and arranged "Dance in the Dark"; they were also responsible for instrumentation. Garibay solely handled programming, and served as the main producer, with Gaga co-producing with him. Jonas Westling, Dan Parry and Christian Delano were the recording and tracking engineers. The song was recorded at Metropolis Studios in London.

Gaga told the Los Angeles Times that the inspiration behind "Dance in the Dark" came from an intimate experience between two people in a bedroom. The song is about a girl who prefers to have sex in the dark as she feels self-conscious about her body. Gaga explained, "She doesn't want her man to see her naked. She will be free, and she will let her inner animal out, but only when the lights are out." While working on the Mac AIDS Fund, she realized that women her age do not express such insecurities, fearing that their boyfriends would not love them if they did so. Gaga added that she herself struggled with issues of body image and self-doubt.

All of these new things entering my life are changing the way I view my purpose, but 'Dance in the Dark' in particular is about me wanting to live—but also, the song isn't called 'Dance in the Light'. I'm not a gospel singer trying to cross people over. What I'm saying is, 'I get it. I feel you, I feel the same way, and it's OK.' I hope and pray that I can inspire some sort of change in people subliminally through the show. They're singing 'Dance in the Dark,' but they're dancing and they're free, they're letting it out. But the songs are not about freedom, they're about [the fact that] I get it. I feel the way you feel.

— Gaga, Los Angeles Times, 2009

"Dance in the Dark" was released as a promotional single from the extended play (EP) The Fame Monster—the reissue of Gaga's debut studio album, The Fame (2008)—on November 9, 2009, when it became available to purchase on iTunes Store in Belgium. According to MTV, Interscope Records initially planned "Dance in the Dark" as the EP's third single, but Gaga preferred "Alejandro", which was released on April 20, 2010. Universal Music Group issued "Dance in the Dark" to Australian and French radio, on July 26 and August 25, 2010, respectively, making it the EP's fourth and final single. In March of that year, Gaga released her first remix album entitled The Remix, which included the Monarchy Stylites rendition of the song.

== Music and lyrics ==
"Dance in the Dark"
A 28-second sample of "Dance in the Dark", where Gaga sings the interlude. The song, described as Europop, has influences of retro and new wave music in its composition, and features Gaga singing in a synth-like voice.

"Dance in the Dark" is a Europop track which infuses influences of retro and new wave music in its composition. Author Robin James in the book Resilience & Melancholy: Pop Music, Feminism, Neoliberalism recognized synth-pop elements in the song, which was influenced by Depeche Mode's "Strangelove" (1987). Paul Lester of the BBC and Tony Hardy of Consequence called it an R&B production; Hardy also found dance elements in the song.

"Dance in the Dark" begins with a stuttering introduction and orgasmic groans, followed by Gaga singing the song. Musicologist Alexandra Apolloni found that "Dance in the Dark" was one of many songs where Gaga uses a "technologically-imposed vocal stutter". (Note: Other examples include tracks "Poker Face", "Starstruck", "Paper Gangsta" and "Telephone".) She cited author Daniel Goldmark's opinion that using stutter in American popular music was a way to demonstrate abnormality. For Apolloni, such vocal instabilities complement moments where "bodily vocal labor is audible", a result of Gaga physically manipulating her voice. Apolloni saw moments of "vocal ugliness and abjection" in the song, which she interpreted as Gaga vocally expressing pain and pleasure, eliciting a "'real' (albeit totally performed) non-technological body".

Sal Cinquemani from Slant Magazine noted influences from 1980s music in "Dance in the Dark", writing, "The song isn't a cautionary tale per se, but a call to arms to misfits everywhere." Analyzing the song's music, Michael Cragg of The Guardian found it "a glorious juxtaposition of textures: the harsh, stuttering vocal meshing with that glacial riff, while the processed vocals of the verses burst into the sunshine of the chorus". He wrote about its "robotic" spoken interlude, which he believed is "eventually washed away by a warm synthetic breeze". The interlude references famous dead people: Marilyn Monroe, Judy Garland, Sylvia Plath, JonBenét Ramsey, Liberace, Jesus, Stanley Kubrick, and Diana, Princess of Wales.

The lyrics of the song refer to vampires and werewolves: "Run run her kiss is a vampire grin/The moon lights her way while she's howlin' at him". Gaga explained that the lines conveyed how people rely on external motivations to cope with internal anxiety: "She doesn't feel free without the moon". Gaga said the song discusses self-insecurity common among men and women at any age. Sociologist Mathieu Deflem believed the lyrics "I'm a free bitch, baby!" exemplified Gaga's response to sexism in her music where she confirms her strength as a woman.

== Critical reception and accolades ==
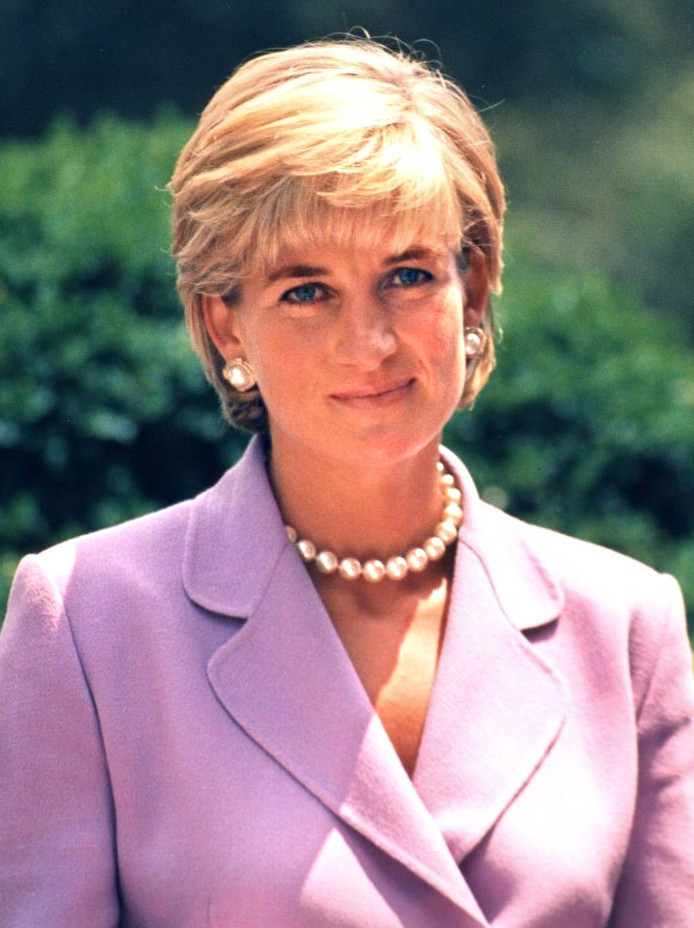
Critics noted the interlude name-checking famous dead people, including Diana, Princess of Wales (pictured in 1997).

"Dance in the Dark" received mixed to positive reviews from music critics. Some called it "campy", single-worthy and an album highlight. Praise focused on the song's suitability for workout, and extravagant and club-friendly production. Reviewers also positively compared Gaga to Madonna and noted the references to famous people. Michael Hubbard of MusicOMH highlighted the spoken-word lyrics referencing Princess Diana: "You will never fall apart Diana, you're still in our hearts / Never let you fall apart / Together we'll dance in the dark." Nick Levine from Digital Spy found that the song "makes you want to dance with your top off in a grotty German bondage basement".

"Dance in the Dark" received a nomination for Best Dance Recording at the 53rd Annual Grammy Awards. The song was ranked as one of Gaga's best by the Official Charts Company, Rolling Stone, The Guardian, Vulture and Glamour. (Note: Attributed to multiple references) It was cited as a "cult favorite" by Vulture. The song's chorus—called "one of Gaga's most lustrous" by Rolling Stone and "deliciously outrageous, sky-scraping" by Vulture—was praised for "pierc[ing] through the mesh of synths like a laser". Other plaudits focused on the song's theme. Glamour argued that its topic about body insecurities and sound (describing it as "one of Gaga's brightest efforts: booming and industrial yet incredibly haunting") made it her most emotionally impactful song to date. Elena Gorgan of Softpedia believed Gaga, through the song, was unafraid of pushing boundaries and changing what people view as "normal".

Some reviews were less enthusiastic, calling the song "slightly too disposable" and finding the dance and R&B production formulaic. Adam White of The Independent liked the beginning, but found that the song "gradually declines into something more middle-of-the-road than it first appears". Hubbard added that "after a stuttering intro of orgasmic groans it becomes a little bit Gaga-by-numbers, which is a shame given the standard of the early tracks".

== Chart performance ==
In late 2009, "Dance in the Dark" charted on the Hungarian Mahasz Single Top 10 lista, the UK Singles Chart and the Canadian Hot 100 at number 9, number 89 and number 88, respectively, for one week. The song debuted at number 43 on the Australian Singles Chart, later peaking at number 24. It entered the French Digital Singles Chart at number 40 and peaked at number 30. In the US, "Dance in the Dark" peaked at number 22 on the Bubbling Under Hot 100 Singles chart in August 2010 and number 9 on Hot Dance/Electronic Digital Songs in October 2010. It reached number two on the Polish Dance Top 50 in October 2010.

== Live performances ==
Gaga performed "Dance in the Dark" as the opening song of the Monster Ball Tour (2009–2011). During the original 2009 leg of the tour, the show began as Gaga appeared behind a giant, green laser-lit video screen featuring scrim lights, in a futuristic silver jeweled jumpsuit with bulbs on it. Wearing matching eye makeup and a mask, she sang "Dance in the Dark" while surrounded by dancers in white balaclavas and jumpsuits. The scrim was lifted during the performance.

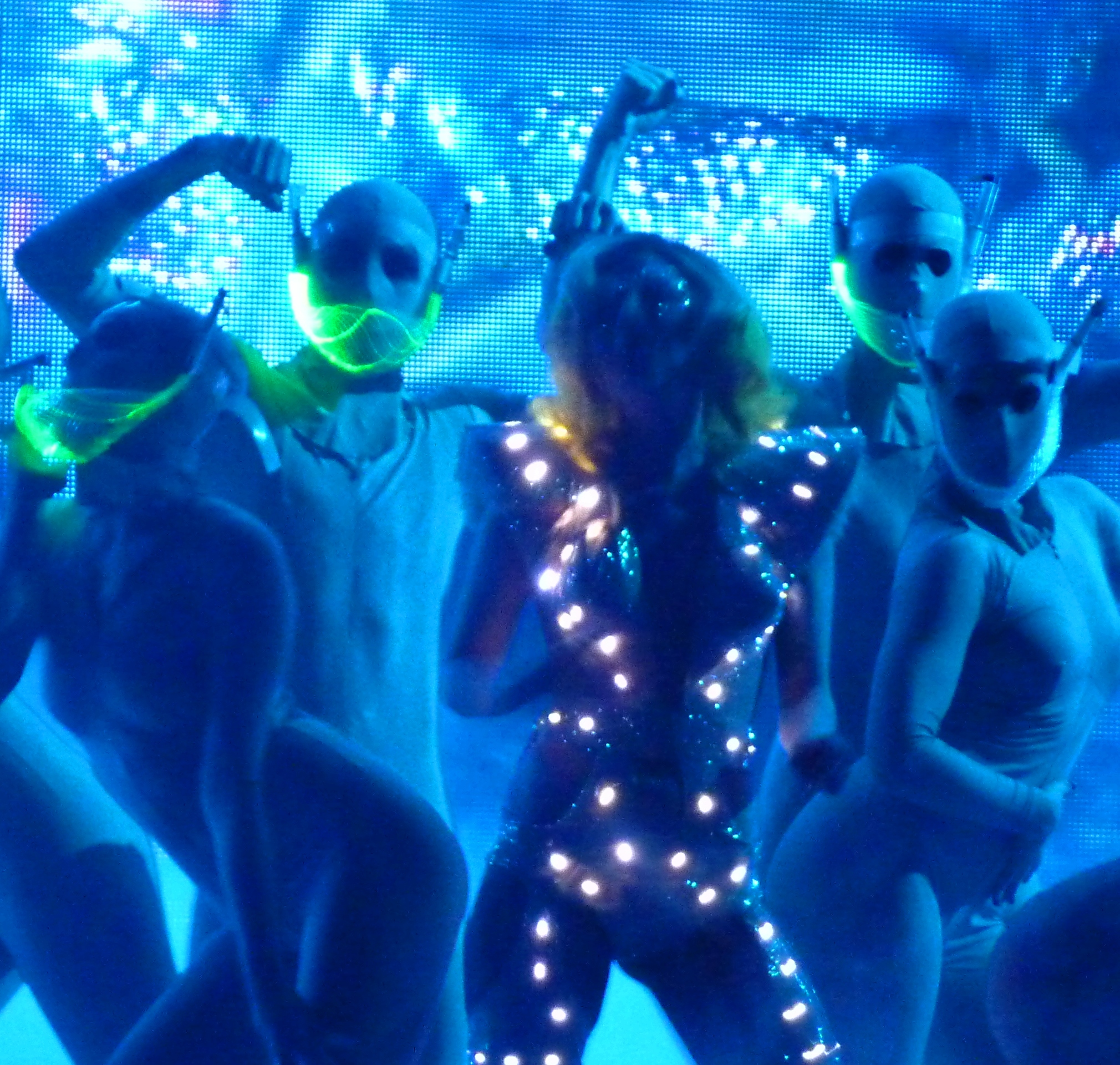
Gaga performing "Dance in the Dark" during the original version of the Monster Ball Tour (2009)

"Dance in the Dark" was again the opening song in the revamped 2010–2011 shows of the Monster Ball Tour. Gaga performed the song in a set reminiscent of a New York City night scene, with flickering neon signs displaying the words "ugly", "sexy" and "liquor", fire escape stairwells and a broken yellow taxi. For Katrin Horn, a postdoctoral fellow in American studies, the "Dance in the Dark" performance helped highlight a recurring theme in Gaga's work from the tour's beginning—"pop culture's obsession with both decay and beauty, or more precisely the decay of beauty"—as the song is dedicated to famous dead people who had struggled with their reputation when they were alive.

Gaga sang "Telephone", the second single from The Fame Monster, and "Dance in the Dark" at the Brit Awards on February 16, 2010, at Earls Court Exhibition Centre. Inspired by the recent death of her friend, fashion designer Alexander McQueen, she changed the concept of her performance at the last minute to pay tribute to him. Gaga said, "I wanted to do a very, very forward performance, something that I felt was a true representation of the future." Her performance of "Dance in the Dark", described as more restrained compared to her previous ones by The Wall Street Journal, began as she got up from her piano while the disco groove of the song was heard. Wearing a lace bodysuit and a large bouffant wig, Gaga took to a giant keytar and performed a techno rendition of the track. In 2015, Liv Moss of Official Charts Company called it one of the "biggest, best and weirdest" performances in the history of Brit Awards. The following year, Daniel Welsh of HuffPost UK cited it as one of Gaga's 15 most memorable performances on television.

Gaga sang "Dance in the Dark" on her 2018–2020 Las Vegas residency show, Enigma. The song was preceded by an interlude, which introduced her alien counterpart, named Enigma. Gaga was sent through a future simulation by the character, and reappeared on stage in a fluorescent green jacket to perform "Dance in the Dark". The song was performed on piano at select dates of The Mayhem Ball tour (2025–2026). The Arts Desk's Thomas H. Green, who found the song's album version cheesy, opined that the live, stripped-down "Dance in the Dark" became "emotionally alive", and a fierce middle finger to gaslighting.

== Credits and personnel ==
Credits adapted from the liner notes of The Fame Monster.

Recording and postproduction locations

- Recorded at Metropolis Studios, London, Englandand Paradise Studios, Hollywood, Los Angeles, California
- Audio mixing at Sarm Studios, London, England
- Audio mastering at Oasis Mastering, Burbank, California

Personnel

- Lady Gaga – producer, instrumentation and arrangement
- Fernando Garibay – co-producer, instrumentation, programming and arrangement
- Jonas Westling – recording engineer
- Dan Parry – recording engineer
- Christian Delano – recording engineer
- Robert Orton – mixer
- Gene Grimaldi – mastering engineer

== Charts ==
=== Weekly charts ===
Weekly chart performance for "Dance in the Dark"
Chart (2009–2011)	Peak; position
Australia (ARIA)	24
Belgium (Ultratop 50 Flanders)	33
Belgium (Ultratop 50 Wallonia)	48
Canada Hot 100 (Billboard)	88
CIS Airplay (TopHit)	49
Czech Republic (Rádio – Top 100)	10
France Airplay (SNEP)	24
France Digital (SNEP)	30
Hungary (Single Top 40)	9
Poland Dance (ZPAV)	38
Poland (Polish Airplay New)	2
Russia Airplay (TopHit)	62
Scottish Singles Sales (Official Charts)	65
UK Singles (Official Charts)	89
Ukraine Airplay (TopHit)	35
US Bubbling Under Hot 100 (Billboard)	22
US Dance/Electronic Digital Songs (Billboard)	9

=== Year-end charts ===
2011 year-end chart performance for "Dance in the Dark"
Chart	Position
Ukraine Airplay (TopHit)	172

== Certifications ==
Certifications for "Dance in the Dark"
Region	Certification	Certified units/sales
Australia (ARIA)	Platinum	70,000^{‡}
^{‡} Sales+streaming figures based on certification alone.

== Release history ==
Release dates and formats
Region	Date	Format(s)	Label(s)	Ref.
Belgium	November 9, 2009	Digital download (Note: as a promotional single)	Universal	
Australia	July 26, 2010	Contemporary hit radio	Universal	
France	August 25, 2010	Radio airplay	Universal	

== Rina Sawayama cover ==
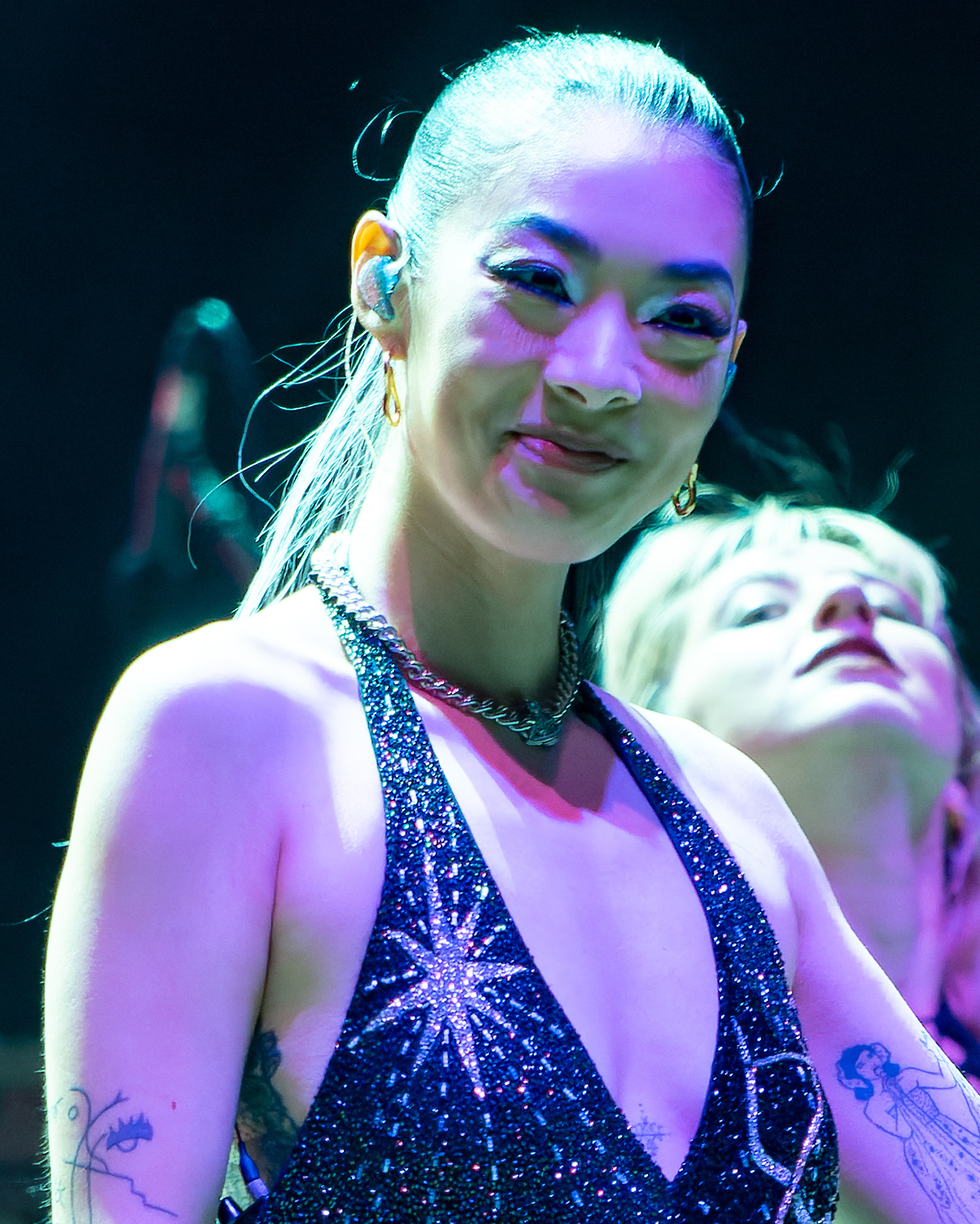
Japanese-British singer Rina Sawayama (pictured in 2022) covered the song in 2020.

On June 29, 2020, Japanese-British singer-songwriter Rina Sawayama released a cover of "Dance in the Dark" as part of Spotify's Spotify Singles series. Produced by Clarence Clarity, the song was included in Sawayama's remix EP Sawayama Remixed (2020). Due to the COVID-19 pandemic, Sawayama recorded her cover at her home studio, instead of Electric Lady Studios in New York City, where Spotify Singles are generally recorded. It is an electropop track with influences of nu metal.

Robin Murray of Clash and Brendan Wetmore of Paper Mag reviewed the song positively. Murray described Sawayama's take on the original as "seismic". Wetmore opined that "Sawayama's voice somehow rivals even Lady Gaga's level of theatricality". He felt that her rendition was "almost painting a picture of an animated Disney love story", because of "how much the track evokes the feeling of listening to pop's greatest hitmakers of the late '90s, the golden era of the Disney ballad."

== Literary sources ==
- Apolloni, Alexandra (2014). "Starstruck: On Gaga, Voice, and Disability". In Iddon, Martin; Marshall, Melanie L. (eds.). Lady Gaga and Popular Music: Performing Gender, Fashion, and Culture. Routledge Studies in Popular Music. Routledge. pp. 190–208. ISBN 978-1-134-07987-2.
- Burns, Lori; Woods, Alyssa; Lafrance, Marc (March 2015). "The Genealogy of a Song: Lady Gaga's Musical Intertexts on The Fame Monster (2009)". Twentieth-Century Music. 12 (1). Cambridge University Press: 3–35. doi:10.1017/S1478572214000176. S2CID 194128676.
- Deflem, Mathieu (2017). "The Sex of Lady Gaga". Lady Gaga and the Sociology of Fame: the Rise of a Pop Star in an Age of Celebrity. Palgrave Macmillan. pp. 169–188. ISBN 978-1-137-58468-7.
- Horn, Katrin (2017). "Taking Pop Seriously: Lady Gaga as Camp". Women, Camp, and Popular Culture: Serious Excess. Palgrave Macmillan. pp. 193–252. ISBN 978-3-319-64845-3.
- Goldmark, Daniel (2006). "Stuttering in American Popular Song, 1890–1930". In Lerner, Neil William; Straus, Joseph Nathan (eds.). Sounding off: theorizing disability in music. Routledge. pp. 91–106. ISBN 978-0-203-96142-1.
- James, Robin (2015). "(Little) Monsters & Melancholics". Resilience & Melancholy: Pop Music, Feminism, Neoliberalism. John Hunt Publishing. pp. 133–173. ISBN 978-1-782-79461-5.
