= Comme des Garçons (Like the Boys) =

2020 single by Rina Sawayama

Single by Rina Sawayama

from the album Sawayama
- Released: 17 January 2020
- Genre: Disco; dance; funk; house; electro house; synth-pop
- Length: 3:01
- Label: Dirty Hit
- Songwriters: Bram Inscore; Nicole Morier; Rina Sawayama
- Producer: Bram Inscore

Rina Sawayama singles chronology
"STFU!" (2019)	"Comme des Garçons (Like the Boys)" (2020)	"XS" (2020)

Music video
- "Comme des Garçons (Like the Boys)" on YouTube

"Comme des Garçons (Like the Boys)" is a song by Japanese singer Rina Sawayama. It was released on 17 January 2020 as the second single from her debut studio album Sawayama through the record label Dirty Hit. The song blends genres such as disco, dance, funk, electro house and synth-pop into a "clubby" record. The song also received a music video.

On 21 February, a remix of the song, featuring Brazilian singer and drag queen Pabllo Vittar was released.

== Background ==
When discussing the track's lyrical content, Sawayama stated, "When I was writing this song I wanted on one hand to lyrically explore the idea of people having to adopt negative male tropes to appear confident, whilst on the other sonically paying homage to the early 2000s dance tracks that made me feel confident. The idea that the socially acceptable version of confidence is in acting "like the boys," otherwise as a woman you get called a bitch - but in the club, we reclaim the word "bitch" as a sign of ultimate confidence ("yes bitch," "work bitch"). I wanted to sit these two together and make a club fashion banger that makes you feeling like THAT bitch whoever you are". The track was originally inspired by a conversation about "the arrogance of would-be presidential hopeful Beto O’Rourke".

== Composition ==
"Comme des Garçons (Like the Boys)" is a "pulsating" and "couture-wielding" disco, dance, funk, house, electro house and synth-pop track which features lo-fi production, influences of Eurodance, "fat" bass, "bouncy" synths, a "glitzy" beat and a tempo of 119 beats per minute. Lyrically, it is a "chill celebration of true confidence" and criticizes the social expectation "how people, regardless of gender, are often expected to only express confidence in conventionally masculine ways".

The production of the remix, handled by Brazilian DJ Brabo, is "infectious" and features a "club-ready" beat and "experimental" synths, as well as a bridge from Vittar.

== Critical reception ==
Uproxx placed "Comme des Garçons (Like the Boys)" at number 36 on its list of 50 best songs of 2020, writing that on the song "[Sawayama] flexes her pop star reflexes on this massive house cut, which will live on well past 2020." Consequence named it the 37th best song of the year and praised the lyrical content.

== Music video ==
On 26 February 2020, the music video for "Comme des Garçons" premiered on YouTube. Directed by Eddie Whelan, the video is "90s-inspired" and shows the singer "dressed in stereotypically male clothing [...] being scanned and examined in a space-age lab, before transforming into a high fashion look and being literally propped up by throngs of men surrounding her in a multicolored landscape". Sawayama explained the idea behind it, stating, "We wanted to make a music video that’s got humour, movement and is essentially a fashion film that combined the visual worlds of Hype Williams, Hiroyuki Nakano, and Boris Vallejo".

== Track listing ==
- Digital download
1. "Comme des Garçons (Like the Boys)" – 3:01
- Digital download – Brabo Remix
1. "Comme des Garçons (Like the Boys)" [Brabo Remix] (featuring Pabllo Vittar) – 3:42
2. "Comme des Garçons (Like the Boys)" – 3:01
3. "STFU!" – 3:23
