= STFU! =

2019 single by Rina Sawayama

Single by Rina Sawayama

from the album Sawayama
- Released: 22 November 2019
- Genre: Nu metal; heavy metal; hard rock; arena rock; avant-pop
- Length: 3:23
- Label: Dirty Hit
- Songwriters: Adam Crisp; Rina Sawayama
- Producer: Clarence Clarity

Rina Sawayama singles chronology
"Flicker" (2018)	"STFU!" (2019)	"Comme des Garçons (Like the Boys)" (2020)

Music video
- "STFU!" on YouTube

"STFU!" (an abbreviation for "shut the fuck up") is a song by Japanese singer-songwriter Rina Sawayama. It was released as the lead single from her debut studio album, Sawayama on 22 November 2019 for digital download and streaming. It is a nu metal, heavy metal, hard rock, arena rock, and avant-pop track with pop influences. Its lyricism criticizes microaggressions against Asian people. "STFU!" received positive reviews from music critics, who praised its aggressive tone and the shift in genre and direction. Rolling Stone listed the song as the 20th best song of 2020.

== Background ==
According to Sawayama, the track was inspired by "early 2000s pop-rock and nu-metal; [...] No Doubt, Limp Bizkit, t.A.T.u. and Evanescence". She also added that she "was really itching to do something that was inspired by like N.E.R.D. or Evanescence or like t.A.T.u., or some of the heavier Britney stuff" and that her goal with the track was to "shock people because [she]'d been away for a while".

== Composition and lyrical themes ==
"STFU!" was noted by critics as a departure from the 2000s-inspired pop and R&B sound of Sawayama's previous works. Sonically, it's an "aggressive", "riotous" blend of nu metal, heavy metal, hard rock, arena rock, and avant-pop with "sugary" pop influences, and instrumentation consisting of "screeching", "frantic" guitars, "thrashing" drums, and a "headbanging" beat. According to Rolling Stone's Rob Sheffield, it combines "two totally different strains of Y2K-era radio — Britney-Backstreet teen disco and Korn-esque nu metal". Lyrically, it is a "riposte to racism" which "confronts the fetishized stereotypes Asian women are subjected to everyday [sic]".

== Music video ==
=== Release and synopsis ===
The music video for the song premiered on 21 November 2019. Directed by Sawayama and Alesandra "Ali" Kurr, it was inspired by the artist's experiences with stereotypes of Asian people. It begins with Sawayama on a date with a man (played by British comedian Ben Ashenden) having a conversation. The man asks Sawayama numerous questions, including whether or not she had visited the Wagamama restaurant at Heathrow Airport, why she sings in English and doesn't make J-pop music, as well as compares her to Sandra Oh and Lucy Liu and reveals that he's working on a "new-age Memoirs of a Geisha".

== Accolades ==
Critics' rankings for "STFU!"
Publication	Accolade	Rank	Ref.
Dazed	The 20 best tracks of 2019	12	
Los Angeles Times	The 50 best songs of 2020	—N/a	
Noisey	The 100 Best Songs of 2020	50	
Rolling Stone	The 50 Best Songs of 2020	20	

== Release history ==
Region	Date	Format	Label	Ref.
Various	22 November 2019	Digital download; streaming	Dirty Hit	
