= Hostyle Gospel discography =

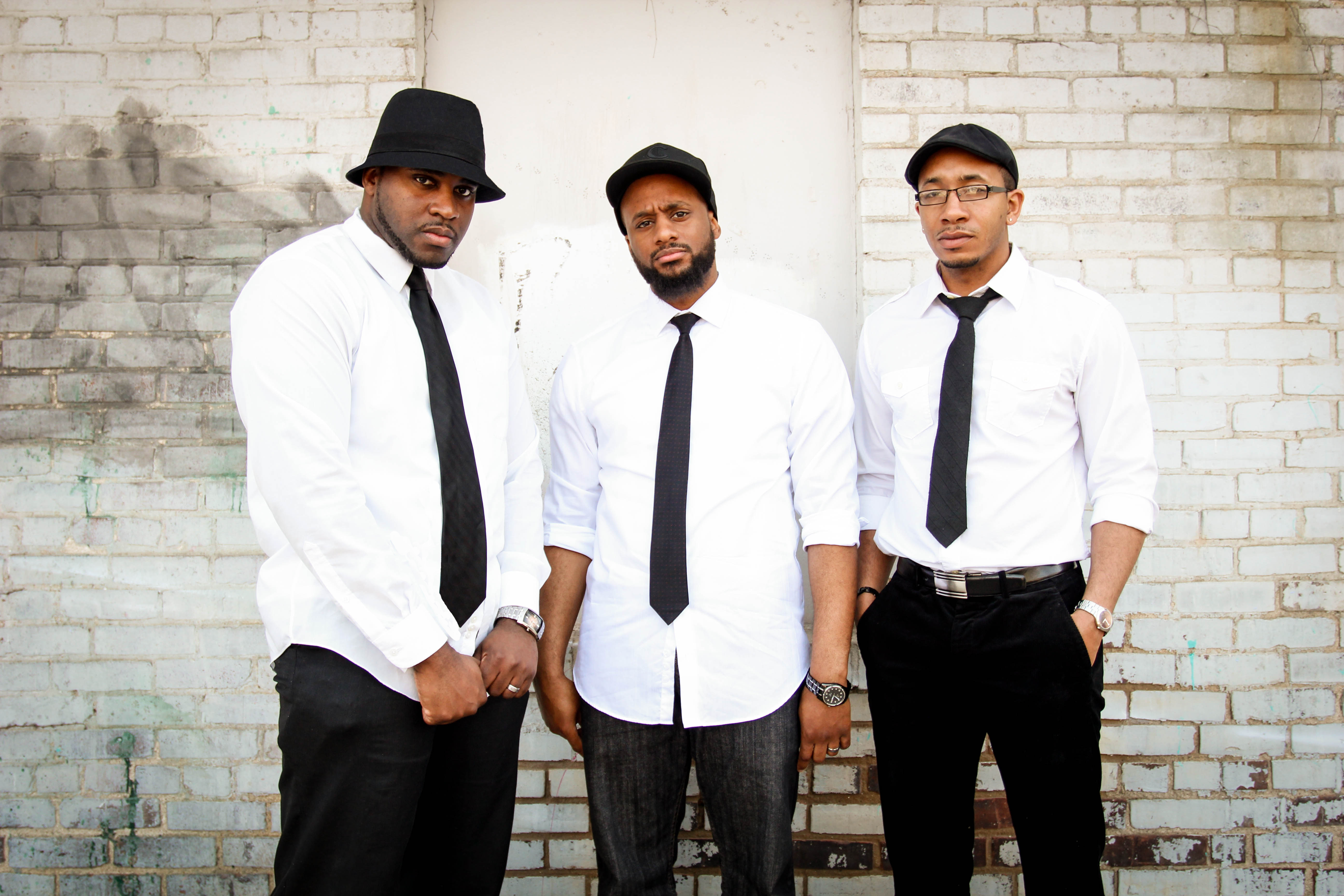
- Studio albums: 4
- Singles: 7
- Music videos: 4
- Mixtapes: 3

The discography of Hostyle Gospel, an American Christian hip hop group, consists of three studio albums, three mixtapes and four music videos.

== Discography ==
=== Studio albums ===
Year	Album details
2007	Let Me At Em: Released: 2007; Label: Hostyle Gospel Ministries; Format: CD, digital download
2011	Immortal Combat: Released: 2011; Label: Hostyle Gospel Ministries; Format: CD, digital download
2013	Desperation: Released: 2013; Label: Hostyle Gospel Ministries; Format: CD, digital download
2016	Hostyle Takeover: Released: 2016; Label: Hostyle Gospel Ministries; Format: CD, digital download

=== Singles ===
List of singles, showing year released and album name
Title	Year	Album
"Mean Mug"	2007	Let Me At Em
"Coming Back Again"	2011	Immortal Combat
"Monsters"	2013	Desperation
"Break"	2013	Desperation
"Skittles & Iced Tea"	2016	Hostyle Takeover
"Clap"	2016	Hostyle Takeover
"I Am Not The One"	2020	I Am Not The One

=== Mixtapes ===
Year	Title
2008	Jesus Side Riders: Released: 2008; Label: Hostyle Gospel Ministries
2008	Five Star Generals: Released: 2008; Label: Hostyle Gospel Ministries
2012	The Calm: Released: 2012; Label: Hostyle Gospel Ministries

== Videography ==
=== Music videos ===
Title	Year	Director
"Mean Mug"	2007	Hostyle Gospel Ministries
"Coming Back Again"	2011	H David
"Monsters" (featuring Lamorax)	2013	H David
"Break"	2013	FlyShotz
