= A.J. Crew =

American hip-hop artist and producer

A. J. Crew
- Born: July 1, 1990 (age 36); Toledo, Ohio, U.S.
- Genre: Hip-hop
- Occupations: Artist, record producer
- Years active: 2009–present
- Labels: A. J. Crew Recordings, Downtown Records, Deluxe Pain
- Website: ajcrew.com

A. J. Crew is an American hip-hop artist and producer, born and raised in Toledo, Ohio. He is known for his work with Skhye Hutch, Naledge (of Kidz in the Hall fame) and charitable efforts towards furthering Sickle Cell Anemia research. He previously attended Columbia College Chicago and Roosevelt University.

== Early life ==
Crew was born July 1, 1990, in Toledo, Ohio and grew up on the South End of the city. He was raised by his mother, attended E.L. Bowsher High School and graduated in the year 2008. It was then that he decided to move to Chicago, Illinois, to pursue music. He was diagnosed with sickle cell disease at age 8.

== Career ==
Crew started his career in 2009. Upon his arrival to Chicago, Illinois, he attended Columbia College Chicago where he met Austin Neely, and together they released a street album, "Nightmares & Daydreams". The album was released on September 1, 2009, via RubyHornet.com, Dope Couture and Soundscape Studios, with owner Michael Kolar serving as executive producer. The Chicago Reader featured a review of said album with Miles Raymer writing, "...on the album in question, Crew shows a lot of potentials - he's got a talent for punch lines and a way of mixing long lyrical with short chopped lines."

In 2009, He worked with Grammy award-winning Rhymefest on "Destiny & Desire", a song from his first mixtape, "Nightmares & Daydreams". On May 1, 2013, A.J. released "The Reality Of It All", The project features a collaboration with Naledge from the indie hip-hop duo, Kidz in the Hall, entitled, "Nah Mean?". In 2017, he was featured in The Thing I Am a hip-hop musical by Steve Bannon based on Shakespeare's Coriolanus and it was produced and realised by NowThis.

He was invited by Converse to record at OutKast’s legendary Stankonia Studios in Atlanta, Georgia as a part of their global Rubber Tracks initiative. One of the songs recorded during these sessions was "Vibes", a song that appears on his 2018 project "Excuses." The single was also released by Converse and Amoeba Music on 7" vinyls distributed at Amoeba Music in Hollywood, California during a show Crew performed at for the Converse Rubber Tracks campaign in 2016.

In 2018, he featured on Rafters by Clarence Clarity, the song was reviewed by Anthony Fantano of The Needle Drop.

In 2022, he featured on PATIENT ROLE by Basic Printer for their album, HAHA YEAH.

== Discography ==
Albums

Title	Album details
Nightmares & Daydreams	Label: self-released; Released: September 1, 2009; Format: Digital download
Excuses	Label: self-released; Released: February 16, 2018; Format: CD, Digital download, streaming

Singles

Title	Album	Details
TxtMsgAlrt!; Destiny & Desire (feat. Rhymefest)	Nightmares & Daydreams	Released: 2009; Format: Digital download
Nah Mean? (feat. Naledge)	The Reality of It All	Released: 2012; Format: Digital download
Don't Ask Me (Crafty); Y.F.U. (feat. G-Scott)	The Reality of It All	Released: 2013; Format: Digital download
Who Knew?	-	Released: 2014; Format: Digital download, streaming
Young Santiago	-	Released: 2016; Format: Digital download, streaming; Note: non-album single
The Word	Excuses.	Released: 2016; Format: Digital download, streaming
Bout That; You Ain't Coming Round Here	-	Released: 2017; Format: Digital download, streaming; Note: non-album single
Have You Ever	Excuses.	Released: 2017; Format: Digital download, streaming
Expensive (feat. Iridas); Long Hair Freestyle	Excuses.	Released: 2018; Format: Digital download, streaming
Find Me; The What; Compassion; All Yo Friends; Chopped; Send It Back; Time Again; What You Want; 6pm in Santa Monica; Floating; Same Side; Dreams; Everything Same; Wylin; Psycho Man; On God; No One Cares (The World Could End); You’re Not Mine; Weedz (feat. Nyaze Vincent); All the Power of the Sun; Summertime (Demo); Ghost Me; When I Die; Flowers (feat. Kristofer Bryant)		Released: 2019; Format: Digital download, streaming; Note: non-album singles

Guest appearances

Song title	Artist	Details
Never Gets Old - Rap Remix (feat. Allan Kingdom, Casey Veggies & A.J. Crew)	Penguin Prison	Label: Downtown Records; Released: 2015; Format: CD, Digital download, streaming
Useless (feat. A.J. Crew)	ANGELZ	Label: self-released; Released: 2015; Format: Digital download, streaming
Don't Lie (feat. A.J. Crew & Troy Joe)	AR Ferdinand	Label: WUBADUBDUB; Released: 2017; Format: Digital download, streaming
Rafters (with A.J. Crew)	Clarence Clarity	Label: Deluxe Pain; Released: 2018; Format: Digital download, streaming
You and Me (feat. A.J. Crew)	Pxy.Hwy	Label: self-released; Released: 2019; Format: Digital download, streaming
100k Bracelet (feat. A.J. Crew)	Carlos Figz	Label: self-released; Released: 2019; Format: Digital download, streaming
PATIENT ROLE (Feat A.J. Crew)	Basic Printer	Label: self-released; Released: 2019; Format: CD, Digital download, streaming

Mixtapes

- The Reality Of It All

EPs

- A

Production discography

- Demarco Castle - "XL (Excel)" ("On The Road To Glory: My Story")

== Charity work ==
In February 2012, Crew launched a "Still Waiting" campaign to spread awareness and raise funds for Sickle Cell Anemia research and donated half of the proceeds from promotional single, "Still Waiting", to the Sickle Cell Disease Association of America. He was interviewed by The Torch about his charity work the same year.
