= Hold the Girl (song) =

- Standard cover (Note: This artwork is used as the Hold the Girl album cover in digital and CD formats since 2023.)

Single by Rina Sawayama

from the album Hold the Girl
- Written: September 2020
- Released: 27 July 2022
- Recorded: Late 2020
- Genre: Dance-pop, R&B, UK garage, eurodance
- Length: 4:05
- Label: Dirty Hit
- Songwriters: Rina Sawayama; Jonny Lattimer
- Producers: Rina Sawayama; Clarence Clarity

Rina Sawayama singles chronology
"Catch Me in the Air" (2022)	"Hold the Girl" (2022)	"Phantom" (2022)

Music video
- "Hold the Girl" on YouTube

"Hold the Girl" is a song by Japanese singer Rina Sawayama from her second studio album of the same name (2022). It was released through Dirty Hit on 27 July 2022 as the third single from the album.

== Background and release ==
In May 2022, Sawayama announced her second studio album, Hold the Girl was set for release on 2 September 2022. She then proceeded to release the singles "This Hell" and "Catch Me in the Air" in May and June, respectively. On July 21, Sawayama posted teasers for the title track on TikTok, with the caption "single out next week". Three days later, on July 24, Sawayama announced that "Hold the Girl" would release three days later on Wednesday, July 27. On the day of the song's release, she announced that the album would be pushed back from 2 September to 16 September due to "production issues", however promised a fourth single would be published before then.

== Composition ==
"Hold the Girl" is a "typically ambitious, multi-faceted pop song, addressing both the trauma and catharsis of moving forward in life. The song was written in late 2020 after an intense therapy session." Writing for Rolling Stone UK, Hannah Ewens wrote that "Hold the Girl" sees Sawayama singing with 2000s R&B vocals and "opens like a holy gesture to Madonna's 'Like a Prayer' and becomes an emotional dancefloor filler".

== Music video ==
An accompanying music video for "Hold the Girl" was released on 3 August 2022 and sees Sawayama "stuck in a time loop within the bounds of a 19th century farmhouse until she finally breaks free."

== Personnel ==
- Rina Sawayama – performer, songwriter
- Jonny Lattimer – songwriter
- Barney Lister – producer
- Clarence Clarity – producer

== Charts ==
Chart performance for "Hold the Girl"
Chart (2022)	Peak position
Japan (Japan Hot 100)	91
