= Better Luck Next Time =

Better Luck Next Time may refer to:

- "Better Luck Next Time" (The Outer Limits), a 1999 episode
- Better Luck Next Time (band), an American pop punk band
  - Better Luck Next Time (Better Luck Next Time album) (2006)
- Better Luck Next Time (EP), by Midwxst (2022)
- Better Luck Next Time (Sundara Karma album) (2023)
- "Better Luck Next Time", a song by Irving Berlin used in the musical Top Hat (2011)
- "Better Luck Next Time", a song by Kelsea Ballerini (2019)
- "Better Luck Next Time", a song by Oingo Boingo, on the soundtrack for the film The Last American Virgin (1982)
