= Oblivion! =

EP by Sundara Karma
- Released: 1 April 2022
- Genre: Future pop; emo; pop rock
- Length: 17:35
- Label: AWAL; Chess Club
- Producer: Clarence Clarity

Sundara Karma chronology
Kill Me (2020)	Oblivion! (2022)	Better Luck Next Time (2023)

Singles from Oblivion!
- 1. "Godsend" Released: 17 September 2021; 2. "Oblivion!" Released: 10 February 2022; 3. "All These Dreams" Released: 15 March 2022

Professional ratings
Review scores
Source	Rating
DIY	4.5/5 stars
Dork	4/5 stars
Gigwise	6/10 stars

Oblivion! is the fifth extended play by British indie rock band Sundara Karma. The EP was released on 1 April 2022 through Chess Club Records. It is the band's second EP that was produced by Clarence Clarity, after the first being their 2020 EP, Kill Me.

== Style and composition ==
Oblivion! stylistically has a combination of future pop, pop rock and '00s emo sounds. Frontman Oscar Pollock said he "wanted to take pop rock to a maximalist and super saccharine place" for the EP's production. During the making, he had been revisiting music from around 2003 and felt nostalgic about it at the time. Both Oblivion! and Kill Me were done in the same headspace Pollock was in that he described them as "siblings".

== Track listing ==
Oblivion! track listing
No.	Title	Length
1.	"Oblivion!"	3:20
2.	"Everytime"	3:10
3.	"Desire"	3:39
4.	"All These Dreams"	3:03
5.	"Godsend"	4:22
Total length:		17:35
