= Coming Back Again =

Coming Back Again may refer to:

- "Coming Back Again", a song by the Cat Empire on their 2023 album Where the Angels Fall
- "Coming Back Again", a song by Clay Walker on his 2003 album A Few Questions
- "Coming Back Again", a song by Hostyle Gospel on their 2011 album Immortal Combat
- "Coming Back Again", a song by Kings of Leon on their 2013 album Mechanical Bull
- "Coming Back Again", a song by the Tea Party on their 2004 album Seven Circles
