= Chapter Six =

Chapter Six refers to a sixth chapter in a book.

Chapter Six, Chapter 6, or Chapter VI may also refer to:

== Music ==
- Chapter 6 (band), a professional a cappella ensemble from Illinois, USA
- Chapter 6: Couples Therapy, the seventh studio album by American recording artist Syleena Johnson released in 2014
- Chapter VI (album), an album by Candlemass released in 1992
- "Chapter Six" (Kendrick Lamar song)", a song by Kendrick Lamar from Section.80

== Television ==
- "Chapter 6" (American Horror Story)
- "Chapter 6" (Eastbound & Down)
- "Chapter 6" (House of Cards)
- "Chapter 6" (Legion)
- "Chapter 6" (Star Wars: Clone Wars), an episode of Star Wars: Clone Wars
- "Chapter 6" (Uncoupled)
- "Chapter 6: Crime Seen", an episode of A Murder at the End of the World
- "Chapter 6: From the Desert Comes a Stranger", an episode of The Book of Boba Fett
- "Chapter 6: The Prisoner", an episode of The Mandalorian
- "Chapter Six" (Boston Public)
- "Chapter Six: An Exorcism in Greendale", an episode of Chilling Adventures of Sabrina
- "Chapter Six: Faster, Pussycats! Kill! Kill!", an episode of Riverdale
- "Chapter Six: Listen With Your Ears, React With Your Face", an episode of Barry
- "Chapter Six: Mama Said", an episode of Katy Keene
- "Chapter Six: Straight Potential", an episode of Special
- Episodes of Stranger Things:
  - "Chapter Six: The Monster", season 1
  - "Chapter Six: The Spy", season 2
  - "Chapter Six: E Pluribus Unum", season 3
  - "Chapter Six: The Dive", season 4
  - "Chapter Six: Escape from Camazotz", season 5

== Other uses ==
- Chapter VI of the Constitution of Australia
- Chapter VI of the United Nations Charter, the chapter on pacific settlement of disputes
