= Hostyle Takeover =

Studio album by Hostyle Gospel
- Released: October 14, 2016
- Genre: Hip hop, christian hip hop, crunk, christian rap, hardcore hip hop, gangsta rap, gospel
- Length: 49:17
- Label: Hostyle Gospel Ministries
- Producer: Big Job, Proverb, Tone Jonez

Hostyle Gospel chronology
Desperation (2013)	Hostyle Takeover (2016)

Hostyle Takeover is the fourth album from Hostyle Gospel. Hostyle Gospel Ministries released the project on October 14, 2016. The Christian hip hop group worked with Tone Jonez, Lamorax, John Givez, Gemstones, Fred Lynch, Marty B, Laquisha Burries and Jonathan Jackson on the production on this album.

Hostyle Gospel is very forthright when talking about their faith on this project and they make sure that it's conveyed that they are representing God in their music. The group also addresses social issues, their marriages, grief and hardship in their lives on this project.

== Reception ==
Specifying in a nine star review by Cross Rhythms, Lins Honeyman responds, "Hostyle Gospel's success lies in an ability to offer up some truly creative and challenging wordplay delivered with technical brilliance and stylistic diversity.

Professional ratings
Review scores
Source	Rating
Cross Rhythms	9/10 stars

== Track listing ==
No.	Title	Writer(s)	Producer(s)	Length
1.	"Intro"	Raynard Glass, Demetrius Morton, Fontaine Pizza,	Hostyle Gospel Ministries	1:33
2.	"Dream" (featuring Tone Jonez)	Raynard Glass, Demetrius Morton, Fontaine Pizza		3:14
3.	"Straight Snap"	Raynard Glass, Demetrius Morton, Fontaine Pizza	Proverb	3:08
4.	"No Justice No Peace"	Raynard Glass, Demetrius Morton, Fontaine Pizza		3:52
5.	"Proverb feat. Lamorax" (featuring Lamorax)	Raynard Glass, Demetrius Morton, Fontaine Pizza, Lamorax	Hostyle Gospel Ministries	3:13
6.	"Red Letters" (featuring Fred Lynch)	Hostyle Gospel Ministries		5:16
7.	"Clap" (featuring Gemstones)	Raynard Glass, Demetrius Morton, Fontaine Pizza, Gemstones		4:23
8.	"They Don’t Know feat" (featuring Lamorax & Marty)	Hostyle Gospel Ministries		4:21
9.	"Big Job"	Hostyle Gospel Ministries		1:18
10.	"Skittles & Iced Tea" (featuring John Givez)	Hostyle Gospel Ministries		4:05
11.	"Number One" (featuring Jonathan Jackson)	Hostyle Gospel Ministries		4:23
12.	"King Soloman"	Hostyle Gospel Ministries		1:18
13.	"My Block" (featuring Laquisha Burries)	Hostyle Gospel Ministries		4:29
14.	"Angel" (featuring Tone Jonez)	Hostyle Gospel Ministries		4:44
Total length:				49:17

=== Music videos ===
- "Skittles & Iced Tea" (featuring John Givez)
- "Clap" (Gemstones)

== Personnel ==
=== Performance ===
- Hostyle Gospel - primary artists

==== Featured artists ====
- John Givez
- Gemstones
- Lamorax
- Tone Jonez
- Fred Lynch

=== Production and engineering ===
- Fontaine Pizza - engineer, producer
- Raynard Glass - engineer, producer
- Demetrius Morton - producer
- King Son - producer
