= Ulfilas' Alphabet =

Studio album by Sundara Karma
- Released: 1 March 2019
- Recorded: July–August 2018
- Studio: RAK Studios
- Genre: Art rock; indie pop
- Length: 54:28
- Label: RCA
- Producer: Stuart Price; Alex Robertshaw

Sundara Karma chronology
Youth Is Only Ever Fun in Retrospect (2017)	Ulfilas' Alphabet (2019)	Kill Me (2020)

Singles from Ulfilas' Alphabet
- 1. "Illusions" Released: 9 October 2018; 2. "One Last Night on This Earth" Released: 1 November 2018; 3. "The Changeover" Released: 17 December 2018; 4. "Higher States" Released: 13 February 2019; 5. "Little Smart Houses" Released: 20 February 2019

Ulfilas' Alphabet is the second studio album by English band Sundara Karma. It was released on 1 March 2019 under RCA Records.

Stylistically, the album has been described as a dramatic departure from their previous album, Youth Is Only Ever Fun in Retrospect. The album has been described as having an eclectic range of influences from art rock, indie pop and elements of new rave throughout the record, marking a major departure from the band's pop rock and indie rock-oriented sound. Critically, the album has been nearly universally acclaimed, with critics praising the album's range of influences, relevance, ambition, and confidence. Commercially, the album reached the Top 30 in the Official Charts, although it did not chart as well as their debut album.

The album spawned five singles ahead of the release, including "Illusions", "One Last Night on This Earth", and "Higher States". It was produced by Stuart Price, and Everything Everything member, Alex Robertshaw.

== Background and recording ==
Ulfilas' Alphabet was recording during Summer 2018 at RAK Studios in West London, where the band recruited Alex Robertshaw from Everything Everything for producing the album. In describing the choice to recruit Robertshaw for producing, frontman Oscar Pollock said that Robertshaw "brought his Eurorack, which is full of different modular synthesisers and I think that bought a whole different element to it. We put everything from drums and guitars through it so that was a new thing we didn’t have on the first record."

The album was first announced on 9 October 2018 in correlation with the release of their lead off single, "Illusions".

== Artwork and title ==
The album cover features two skeletons dancing on a colored background with an array of colours inverting from the center of the cover. The title references Ulfilas, a 4th-century CE bishop and missionary, who is credited with the translation of the Bible into Gothic, and with developing the Gothic alphabet.

== Music and composition ==
Shannon Cotton, writing for Gigwise described Ulifilas' Alphabet as "ripping up" the rule book to rewrite their own, describing the sound as far more experimental album than their 2017 debut, Youth Is Only Ever Fun in Retrospect, which was described more indie rock-oriented. In the interview with Gigwise, the band felt that album was more eclectic of sounds, while Cotton described the sounds are influences of new rave on tracks such as "Higher States" to folk rock on "A Song For My Future Self".

When writing and orchestrating a sound for the album, Pollock said that he "[tends] not to think about what I'm writing when I write". Pollock joked that he "can write a folk song and then next it could be dubstep, but I think it’s good to not judge those things".

== Release and promotion ==
=== Singles ===
Five singles were released on Ulifas' Alphabet four of which were released prior to the release of the album. "Illusions", "One Last Night on This Earth", and "The Changeover" came out in 2018, while "Higher States" and "Little Smart Houses" were released in 2019.

=== Music videos ===
Oscar Pollock also was charged with the music videos for the album. Pollock described the processes of directing the music videos as an exciting and fascinating experience saying that he was "so happy that I’ve been able to do them, it’s something I’ve always really wanted to do and over the past three years I’ve been getting more and more obsessed with film and I find it a really fascinating world. I love to merge film and music in all of the stuff we do, that’s why it’s nice to do music videos to have a bridge into that world, but yeah I’m still cutting my teeth, it’s so much fun, I’m really enjoying it."

== Critical reception ==
Professional ratings
Aggregate scores
Source	Rating
AnyDecentMusic?	7.5/10
Metacritic	81/100
Review scores
Source	Rating
AllMusic	4/5 stars
DIY	4/5 stars
Dork	5/5 stars
Evening Standard	4/5 stars
The Line of Best Fit	8/10
NME	4/5 stars
Q	4/5 stars
The Skinny	3/5 stars

Ulifas' Alphabet was critically acclaimed by contemporary music critics upon release. On review aggregator website, Metacritic, Ulifas' Alphabet has an average critic score of 81 out of 100, indicating "universal acclaim" based on six critics. On AnyDecentMusic?, Ulifas' Alphabet has an average score of 7.5 out of 10 based on seven contemporary music critic scores.

== Track listing ==
Ulfilas' Alphabet track listing
No.	Title	Length
1.	"A Song for My Future Self"	3:32
2.	"One Last Night on This Earth"	3:44
3.	"Greenhands"	3:54
4.	"Symbols of Joy & Eternity"	3:33
5.	"Higher States"	4:18
6.	"The Changeover"	4:46
7.	"Illusions"	5:05
8.	"Little Smart Houses"	3:38
9.	"Duller Days"	3:46
10.	"Sweet Intentions"	3:36
11.	"Rainbow Body"	4:43
12.	"Ulfilas' Alphabet"	5:20
13.	"Home (There Was Never Any Reason to Feel So Alone)"	4:33
Total length:		54:28

== Personnel ==
The following individuals were credited with the recording, composition, and mastering of the album.

Sundara Karma

- Ally Baty – guitar
- Dom Cordell – bass
- Haydn Evans – drums
- Matt Maltese – piano
- Oscar Pollock – guitar, vocals

Recording and mastering

- Duncan Fuller – engineer
- Kaines – producer, programming
- Oscar Pollock – artwork, composer, design, group member, guitar, vocals
- Stuart Price – mixing, producer, programming
- Sundara Karma – primary artist
- Josie Wright – artwork, design
- Tim Young – mastering

== Charts ==
Chart performance for Ulfilas' Alphabet
Chart (2019)	Peak position
UK Albums (OCC)	28
