= On the Road to Glory My Story =

On the Road to Glory: My Story

Mixtape by Gemstones
- Released: 2010

Gemstones chronology
The Testimony of Gemstones (2008)	On the Road to Glory: My Story (2010)	Troubles of the World

Singles from On the Road to Glory: My Story
- 1. "My Hood" Released: May 22, 2010

On the Road to Glory: My Story is the 2010 album from Gemstones.

== Track listing ==
#	Title	Producer(s)	Feature guest(s)
1	"Intro" (Chris Ellington)		
2	"Faded Pictures"	Darnell Beasley	
3	"Won't Be Long"	Darnell Beasley	
4	"Heartbeat Of The World"	Awol	
5	"All I Dream Of"	Soundtrakk	
6	"New Day"	Panama	
7	"Deeds"	Darnell Beasley	Rob Jones
8	"Crazy"	Stanley Meeks	
9	"Where Would I Be"	Stanley Meeks	Sa'alek
10	"Tired"	Bmfitf	
11	"XL (Excel)"	A.J. Crew	Sa'alek
12	"Bush"	Darnell Beasley	Trishaun Colman
13	"Grateful"	Darnell Beasley	Liam Pepol
14	"You"	Darnell Beasley	
15	"R.I.P St. Nic"	Corey (Keys) Martin & Yrhynest	
16	Running		
17	"17"		
18	"My Hood"		
19	"Chances of Heaven"	Stanley Meeks	
20	"Stones"	Darnell Beasley	
21	"Dear God"	Emergency	Shayla G, Hi-Money ransum, Dat Bizness, B. Sport

== Release history ==
Region	Date
United States	August 22, 2010
