= Think: Peace =

THINK: PEACE

Studio album by Clarence Clarity
- Released: 4 October 2018
- Genres: R&B, synth-pop, new wave
- Length: 39:07
- Label: Deluxe Pain

Clarence Clarity chronology
No Now (2015)	THINK: PEACE (2018)

Singles from Think: Peace
- 1. "Vapid Feels Are Vapid / Same" Released: 10 November 2016; 2. "Fold 'Em" Released: 13 April 2017; 3. "W€ CHANG€" Released: 18 July 2017; 4. "Naysayer Godslayer" Released: 24 August 2017; 5. "Next Best Thing" Released: 18 September 2018; 6. "Adam & the Evil" Released: 3 October 2018

Think: Peace (stylised as THINK: PEACE) is the second album by English musician Clarence Clarity. It was released on 4 October 2018 on Clarity's own Deluxe Pain label.

== Background ==
In 2016, a year after the release of Clarity's debut album, he released the Same EP, an EP consisting of the same track, "Same", repeated five times onto his SoundCloud; he also released the single "Vapid Feels Are Vapid". The following year, he began releasing more singles with minimal to no advertising, such as "Fold 'Em" and "Naysayer Godslayer", the latter of which featured the vocals of Rina Sawayama on the chorus, whom Clarity had executive produced the mini album Rina for that same year. He stated in that same year that he was working on an album under the name Leave Earth.

In September 2018, the album's new title was revealed to be Think: Peace, and would be released on 4 October on his own Deluxe Pain label. Upon the release of the album, Leave Earth was revealed to be a playlist of singles released from 2016 to 2018 instead, including the single versions of tracks featured on the album. On 14 October, just over a week after the album's release, Clarity released the album's instrumentals onto his Bandcamp.

== Composition ==
Reviewers noted that Think: Peace's sound was stripped back production-wise, and contained more traditional compositions compared to Clarity's previous effort, No Now, with a wider audience appeal. The songs often feature sounds of genres rooted in the 80s, such as synth-pop and new wave, while carrying over the R&B sound featured heavily in No Now. Many of the songs featured on the album are remixed versions of previously released singles, with several tracks featuring portions of other singles, such as "Naysayer, Magick Obeyer" featuring the last chorus of "Adam & the Evil" rather than the last chorus of the single "Naysayer Godslayer".

== Track listing ==
All tracks are written by Clarence Clarity.

No.	Title	Length
1.	"CC-Wave"	0:40
2.	"Adam & the Evil*"	2:27
3.	"W€ CHANG£"	3:19
4.	"Naysayer, Magick Obeyer"	4:38
5.	"Vapid Feels Ain't Vapid"	4:01
6.	"Next Best Thing"	3:16
7.	"Fold 'Em/Silver Lake Reservoir" (featuring Shadi)	5:07
8.	"Tru(e) Love"	5:20
9.	"SAME?"	3:38
10.	"Law of Fives"	3:08
11.	"2016"	3:27
Total length:		39:01
