= Kill Me (EP) =

EP by Sundara Karma
- Released: 24 November 2020
- Recorded: June – July 2020
- Genre: Experimental pop; hyperpop
- Label: AWAL; Chess Club
- Producer: Clarence Clarity

Sundara Karma chronology
Ulfilas' Alphabet (2019)	Kill Me (2020)	Oblivion! (2022)

Singles from Kill Me
- 1. "Kill Me" Released: 1 October 2020; 2. "Artiface" Released: 26 October 2020

Kill Me is the fourth extended play released by British indie rock band Sundara Karma. The EP was released on 24 November 2020 through Chess Club Records.

== Background and recording ==
Following touring in support of their sophomore album, Ulfilas' Alphabet, lead singer Oscar Pollock took most of 2020 off from music. Pollock told NME in an October 2020 interview that he "got to a point where I felt lost within myself". Pollock further explained that he spent much of 2020 coping with existentialism and depression. Pollock stated that ahead of the release of the EP, which was recorded throughout 2020, that it "seems to have resolved".

The entire album was recorded and produced during the worldwide COVID-19 pandemic. The songs were recorded by the band in their personal studio, while the production by Clarence Clarity was undertaken via phone calls and e-mail.

== Style and composition ==
Oscar Pollock told NME that the EP is more expansive than the traditional guitar-driven tracks found in their first two studio albums. "[It is] vaster and less emo. I was saying over a year ago that I was ready to move on from ‘Ulfilas’ Alphabet’, and I had a bunch of songs kicking around. But, if I don't get given a deadline, I'll just let songs rot on a hard drive".

== Critical reception ==
Professional ratings
Aggregate scores
Source	Rating
Album of the Year	67/100
Review scores
Source	Rating
DIY	4/5 stars
Dork	4/5 stars
Riot	4/10

Kill Me was met with mixed reviews by contemporary music critics. On review aggregator website, Album of the Year, Kill Me has an average rating of 67 out of 100. Stephen Ackroyd, writing for Dork magazine, gave the album a positive review, saying that the EP, "is a collection of tracks that sends Sundara streaming into the starlight". Ackroyd further praised Clarence Clarity's production work on the album. Ackroyd summarized the EP as an exciting preamble of what could come on the band's third full-length album.

Writing for DIY magazine, Emma Swann gave the album four stars out of five. Swann called the album a sprawling album that can get lost at times, especially with Clarity's production. However, Swann said that because of the band's "knack for a hook, and love of a big chorus is what keeps 'Kill Me' from descending into total chaos".

Ben Kitto, writing for Riot Magazine, was critical of the EP calling it "turgid". Kitto further critiqued the production of the record saying that "the production doesn’t do the dragging, bombastic drum line the justice it thinks it does. Meanwhile, Pollock’s vocal is less dynamic and inimitable, and more one-note. And the mess of the rest of the production drowns it out anyway." Kitto gave Kill Me a four out of ten rating.

== Track listing ==
All music is composed by Oscar Pollock, Dom Cordell, Ally Baty, and Haydn Evans.

No.	Title	Length
1.	"Kill Me"	3:41
2.	"O Stranger"	3:22
3.	"Your Touch"	5:09
4.	"Artifice"	4:28
5.	"Lifelines"	4:25
Total length:		21:05
