= Better Luck Next Time (Sundara Karma album) =

Studio album by Sundara Karma
- Released: 27 October 2023
- Genre: Indie rock; alternative rock
- Length: 30:35
- Label: Is Right
- Producer: Rich Turvey

Sundara Karma chronology
Oblivion! (2022)	Better Luck Next Time (2023)

Better Luck Next Time is the third and final studio album by English band Sundara Karma, released on 27 October 2023 through Is Right Records. It was produced by Rich Turvey and preceded by the single "Friends of Mine", "Baby Blue" and "Wishing Well". The band toured the UK in support of the album in November and December 2023.

== Background ==
A press release called the album's sound a "departure" from the "electro-pop elements" present on their 2022 EP Oblivion!, with DIY calling the single "Friends of Mine" a return to the "euphoric, guitar-driven sound" of the band's debut, Youth Is Only Ever Fun in Retrospect (2017).

== Critical reception ==
Professional ratings
Review scores
Source	Rating
DIY	4/5 stars
Dork	4/5 stars

Mia Smith of DIY felt that the band's "third could well act as a rallying cry for 2010s indie kids", calling it "like a hug from a warm blanket. Albeit one that smells faintly of dark fruits cider". Dork's Emma Quin described it as "an energetic release well worth listening to" and wrote that it "extends [the band's] legacy, feeling vibrant, boyish and tender" as it "reliv[es] memories of nights out, friendships and relationships".

== Track listing ==
All tracks are written by Oscar Pollock, except where noted.

Better Luck Next Time track listing
No.	Title	Length
1.	"Baby Blue"	2:54
2.	"Friends of Mine"	3:26
3.	"Miss Again" (Pollock, Fred Macpherson)	3:39
4.	"Wishing Well"	3:51
5.	"Violence to the Spirit"	3:21
6.	"Sounds Good to Me" (Pollock, Joe Janiak)	2:46
7.	"Pain + Pleasure" (Pollock, Janiak)	3:26
8.	"Okay I'm Lonely"	3:19
9.	"Better Luck Next Time"	3:53
Total length:		30:35
