= Loveblood =

EP by Sundara Karma
- Released: 4 November 2016
- Genres: New wave; heartland rock; indie rock
- Length: 16:34
- Label: Sony Music

Sundara Karma chronology
EP II (2015)	Loveblood (2016)	Youth Is Only Ever Fun in Retrospect (2017)

Loveblood is the third extended play by the British indie rock band Sundara Karma. The EP was released on 4 November 2016.

The EP contained the four lead singles ahead of their debut studio album, Youth Is Only Ever Fun in Retrospect: "Loveblood", "Olympia", "She Said", and "A Young Understanding". Additionally, the extended play consisted of the song, "The Night".

== Track listing ==
All lyrics are written by Oscar Pollock; all music is composed by Pollock, Dom Cordell, Ally Baty, and Haydn Evans.

No.	Title	Length
1.	"Loveblood"	4:05
2.	"Olympia"	4:12
3.	"She Said"	3:44
4.	"A Young Understanding"	4:04
5.	"The Night"	0:29
Total length:		16:34
