= Higher States =

Single by Sundara Karma

from the album Ulfilas' Alphabet
- Released: 24 January 2019
- Recorded: July–August 2018
- Studio: RAK Studios
- Genre: Art rock; new rave; indie pop
- Length: 4:18
- Label: RCA
- Producer(s): Stuart Price; Alex Robertshaw

Sundara Karma singles chronology
"The Changeover" (2018)	"Higher States" (2019)	"Little Smart Houses" (2019)

Music video
- "Higher States" on YouTube

"Higher States" is a song by English band Sundara Karma. It was released as the third single from their second studio album, Ulfilas' Alphabet, on 24 January 2019.

== Artwork ==
The album cover features a snake in a spiral. The cover received criticism due to the similarities to Vampire Weekend's single cover for "Harmony Hall/2021" which also features a spiral snake. Coincidentally, both singles were released on 24 January 2019.

== Composition ==
Oscar Pollock described the track as their "rapid firearm", specifically saying that "all songs are equal, but some songs are more equal than others. This song is our equaliser, our rapid firearm. It’s invasive like a blazing probe and has more drops than Diplo."

== Critical reception ==
Sam Taylor, writing for Dork praised the track, calling "Higher States" "a 10/10 banger".

Will Oliver, writing for the music webzine, We All Want Someone To Shout For, said "Higher States" had the band's expected "eccentric vibe". He summarized the track as "a more pop-friendly Wild Beasts".

== Music video ==
On 13 February 2019, the band released the music video to "Higher States". Frontman, Oscar Pollock edited and directed the music video. In orchestrating the music video, Pollock described himself as a "mad scientist". Pollock said that "I wanted to edit the video as well as direct it and it was ALL CONSUMING! I’m really not the most skilled editor and because I wanted the video to have an extremely fast pace it took me like 1 hour to do 5 seconds of footage. I was a wreck by the end of it. I did it all on my laptop and if you saw me during that period I Iooked like a mad scientist or something… grizzly stuff but I'm super happy with how it turned out!"

Clash magazine said of the music video "has a cinematic quality" and that "the results are brash, eye-catching, and certainly thought-provoking."

== Credits and personnel ==
The following individuals were credited with the recording, composition, and mastering of the track.

Sundara Karma

- Ally Baty — Guitar
- Dom Cordell — Bass
- Haydn Evans — Drums
- Matt Maltese — Piano
- Oscar Pollock — Guitar, vocals

Recording and Mastering

- Duncan Fuller — Engineer
- Kaines — Producer, Programming
- Stuart Price — Producer
- Oscar Pollock — Artwork, Composer, Design, Group Member, Guitar, Vocals
- Stuart Price — Mixing, Producer, Programming
- Sundara Karma — Primary Artist
- Josie Wright — Artwork, Design
- Tim Young — Mastering
