= Catch Me in the Air =

Single by Rina Sawayama

from the album Hold the Girl
- Released: 27 June 2022
- Recorded: Fall 2020
- Genre: Pop rock
- Length: 3:35
- Label: Dirty Hit
- Songwriters: Rina Sawayama; Grace Barker; Oscar Scheller; Adam Crisp; Stuart Price
- Producers: Clarence Clarity; Stuart Price

Rina Sawayama singles chronology
"This Hell" (2022)	"Catch Me in the Air" (2022)	"Hold the Girl" (2022)

Audio video
- "Catch Me in the Air" on YouTube

"Catch Me in the Air" is a song by Japanese singer Rina Sawayama from her second studio album, Hold the Girl (2022). It was released through Dirty Hit on 27 June 2022 as the second single from the album.

== Background and release ==
"Catch Me in the Air" was debuted at SWG3 in Glasgow, Scotland in November 2021 during Sawayama's debut album tour as a teaser for her yet-to-be-announced second album. The album, Hold the Girl, was announced in May 2022, with a release date of 2 September 2022. The lead single, "This Hell", was followed by "Catch Me in the Air" in June 2022. In an interview with Zane Lowe, Sawayama noted that "Catch Me in the Air" was inspired by the music of Gwen Stefani.

== Composition ==
"Catch Me in the Air" uses a key change for a "lifting" effect. The song is a tribute to her mother, who raised Sawayama as a single parent. It was written during the pandemic. When Sawayama debuted the song during the Sawayama tour at Glasgow's SWG3, she told the crowd: “I wrote this song because, in these unprecedented times, I am touring my first record at the same time as finishing my second record. I thought that the first record was really personal – and it was – but this new record is even more personal. This song, I wrote it about my mum, who is a single mum. You know how intense that relationship is – they feel like a sister or a brother. I felt throughout my life that my mum and I have caught each other when we’re falling.”

== Credits ==
- Rina Sawayama – performer, songwriter
- Stuart Price – songwriter, producer
- Clarence Clarity – producer
- Grace Barker – songwriter
- Oscar Scheller – songwriter
- Adam Crisp – songwriter

== Charts ==
Chart performance for "Catch Me in the Air"
Chart (2022)	Peak position
Japan Hot Overseas (Billboard Japan)	13
