= Soul Rebel (John Givez album) =

Studio album by John Givez
- Released: August 28, 2015
- Genre: Christian hip hop, Christian R&B, contemporary R&B, neo soul,
- Length: 56:19
- Label: Kings Dream
- Producer: Anthony Cruz, Dav D, DJ Rek, Jruckers, Lere, Major, Kerry Marshall, Ruslan, Wontel

Soul Rebel is the second studio album from John Givez. Kings Dream Entertainment released the album on August 28, 2015. He worked with Anthony Cruz, Dav D, DJ Rek, Jruckers, Lere, Major, Kerry Marshall, Ruslan, and Wontel, in the production of this album.

== Critical reception ==
Professional ratings
Review scores
Source	Rating
New Release Today	3.5/5 stars

Awarding the album three and a half stars at New Release Today, Dwayne Lacy states, "Soul Rebel will make you uncomfortable, but will also make you take notice." Isaac Borquaye, reviewing the album for Premier Gospel, says, "it did not disappoint." Writing a review from Wade-O Radio, Aubrey McKay writes, "Soul Rebel is musically insane...It's innovative, intelligent and well thought out."

== Track listing ==
No.	Title	Producer(s)	Length
1.	"Intro (Lude)"	Jruckers	1:35
2.	"Elementary Trill"	Anthony Cruz and Ruslan	3:42
3.	"2004"	DJ Rek and Wontel	5:34
4.	"Da Art of Storytellin', pt. 5"	Jruckers and Lere	3:48
5.	"Playaz Inheritance" (featuring Kiki and Kyra De'nae)	Jruckers and Dav D	5:21
6.	"Johnny Law (Green Light)" (featuring Gracy Breslin)	Anthony Cruz	5:19
7.	"Am / Pm" (featuring Beleaf)	Anthony Cruz	2:58
8.	"A Playaz Change of Heart" (featuring JGivens)	Jruckers and DJ Rek	5:01
9.	"Chapter 29"	Jruckers and DJ Rek	3:31
10.	"Sandman (Song)" (featuring Ruslan)	DJ Rek and Kerry Marshall	4:29
11.	"Ride for Me?" (featuring Kiki)	DJ Rek and Anthony Cruz	3:54
12.	"Generation (Y)"	Major	3:14
13.	"Will Not Be Televised"	Jruckers and Lere	3:29
14.	"Outro (Lude)"	Jruckers	1:26
15.	"Rebel Credits"	Anthony Cruz	2:58
Total length:			56:19

== Chart performance ==
Chart (2015)	Peak position
US Christian Albums (Billboard)	7
US Independent Albums (Billboard)	19
US Top Rap Albums (Billboard)	10
