= Melody Fall =

Italian pop punk band

- Origin: Turin, Italy
- Genres: Pop punk
- Years active: 2003 – present
- Labels: Pan Music Production; Universal Music (Ita); Radtone Music (Jap); Band(B&)Recordings (US)
- Members: Fabrizio Panebarco (Vocals/Guitar); PierAndrea Palumbo (Bass/Vocals); Davide Pica (Guitar); Andrea Bessone (Drums)
- Past members: Marco Ferro (Drums)
- Website: Official band website

Melody Fall (often shortened to MF) is an Italian pop punk band, that formed in 2003 in Turin.

== History ==
In January 2005, Fabrizio Pan (Vocals, Guitar), PierAndrea Palumbo (Bass, backing vocals) and Marco Ferro (Drums) were in their first year of high school in Turin. They wanted to play music like pop punk bands Blink-182, Sum 41 and New Found Glory. They formed a band called Ducks 33, and started to play in Turin at band contests and schools. After a year of shows, they became more well-known, and decided to record a demo.

Andrea Fusini, an Italian producer, saw the band at a show in July 2005 and decided to produce an EP for them, Melody Fall EP. Guitarist Davide Pica was added to the lineup around the start of the recording process, and the band decided to change their name to Melody Fall. The EP wasn't released at first in Italy. European interest for the band arrived only after the release, and good sales of the EP in Japan with Radtone Records. Just two months later, the band signed with Wynona Records, and toured Italy, Europe and Japan.

In February 2007, the band released their debut album, Consider Us Gone. The album was released in Europe and Japan. A European tour with The New Story followed. Consider Us Gone Sold more than 60,000 copies in Japan, and 30,000 in Europe. The shared the stage with bands such as Strung Out, The Appleseed Cast, and Dust Box.

The band signed with Universal Music in late 2007. In February 2008, the band released a self-titled album, their first with Universal. It was their first album where Pan sang in Italian. They played at the most important Festival of Italian Music, "58° Festival di Sanremo" with more than 10 million viewers.

On 17 May 2008, the band released a split album with American pop punk band Better Luck Next Time called Hybrid. It was released on Radtone Music, and was available only in Japan. The band continued to tour.

In 2010 the second full-length album called Into the Flesh hit the stores, with a new Label in Italy (Nunflower, distributed by Universal) and Japan (Radtone Music). Into the Flesh became Melody Fall's highest selling album with more than 80,000 copies. After Into the Flesh came a new European tour.

In 2012, the band produced a full-length album called Virginal Notes. The album mixed metal, rap, melodic and scream voice, rather than pop punk. It featured a cover song by Mike Shinoda "Remember The Name". In 2012, the band went on tour with Forever the Sickest Kids. The band then paused for 2 years.

Ferro left the band, replaced by Andrea Bessone. Meanwhile, Pan, created a new Label called "Pan Music Production". He became the producer of the band and recorded, mixed, and mastered their fifth album The Shape of Pop Punk to come. The Album was released in Japan in 2014 with Radtone Records. A new market opened in 2015... they toured in China. A 14 date tour earned the band the chance to release their album there. Meanwhile, Pier left the band to grow wine.

In 2016 they toured again Japan for the third time. In 2017 they made a come back in Italy with the "POPPUNK.IT" tour. It was the 10 years anniversary of Consider Us Gone.

== Discography ==
=== Albums ===
- Consider Us Gone (2007)
- Melody Fall (2008)
- Hybrid (2009)
- Into the Flesh (2010)
- Virginal Notes (2012)
- The Shape of Pop-Punk to Come (2014)
- 10 Years (2016)
- The Middle Age of the Dinosaurs (2018)

=== EPs ===
- Melody Fall EP (2006)

=== Splits ===
- Hybrid (2008)

=== Singles ===
| Year | Title | Chart Positions | | | Album |
| Year | Title | ITA Singles Chart | ITA Rock Chart | ITA Airplay | Album |
|---|---|---|---|---|---|
| 2008 | "Ascoltami" | 34 | 17 | 90 | Melody Fall |
| 2008 | "I'm So Me/Salvami" | 62 | 50 | 157 | Melody Fall |
