= Blind Elephant =

Studio album by Gemstones
- Released: May 5, 2015
- Genre: Christian hip hop
- Length: 50:18
- Label: Malaco, Xist
- Producer: J.R., RavO, Stanley Meeks

Gemstones chronology
Troubles of the World (2009)	Blind Elephant (2015)

Blind Elephant is the second studio album by Gemstones. Malaco Records alongside Xist Music released the album on May 5, 2015.

== Background ==
He worked with J.R., RavO (Raven-Tiffany Alishia McGriff), and Stanley Meeks.

== Critical reception ==
Professional ratings
Review scores
Source	Rating
New Release Today	3.5/5 stars
Rapzilla	3/5 stars

Awarding the album three and a half stars from New Release Today, Kevin McNeese states, "Blind Elephant is an album that fans have waited a long time for. While lyrically he didn't disappoint, I definitely think the mixing and production could have been better." Richard Spadine, giving the album three stars at Rapzilla, writes, "Contrary to the hype, Blind Elephant is simply a good album. Not a magnum opus, but an impressive, if uneven effort from an artist still in the process of defining himself."

== Track listing ==
No.	Title	Writer(s)	Length
1.	"Quick Go In" (featuring RavO)	Demarco Lamonte Castle, Raven-Tiffany Alishia McGriff	3:04
2.	"Believe"	Castle, Cardell Hardiman, Stanley Meeks, Mark Whitaker, Luther Riley Woodruff	4:35
3.	"Lyrical Miracle"	Castle, McGriff	3:46
4.	"Press Harder"	Castle, Hardiman, Whitaker, Woodruff	4:19
5.	"New World"	Castle, David James Miller, Courtney Orlando Peebles	4:25
6.	"Mama"	Castle, Peebles	3:39
7.	"Temple"	Castley, McGriff, Stanley Meeks, Thomas Michael Morris	5:11
8.	"Selfish" (featuring Precious)	Castle, Hardiman, Meeks, Whitaker, Woodruff	5:28
9.	"Almost Home"	Castle, Marcus A. Davis	4:08
10.	"Don't Let Me Fall" (featuring Annie Castle)	Castle, Meeks, Morris	3:42
11.	"Circles"	Castle, Peebles	3:16
12.	"Rapture" (featuring Demya)	Castle, Peebles	4:45
Total length:			50:18

== Chart performance ==
Chart (2015)	Peak position
US Christian Albums (Billboard)	20
US Heatseekers Albums (Billboard)	14
US Independent Albums (Billboard)	36
US Top Rap Albums (Billboard)	24
