= No Now =

NO NOW

Studio album by Clarence Clarity
- Released: 2 March 2015
- Recorded: 2013–15
- Length: 1:02:24
- Label: Bella Union
- Producer: Clarence Clarity

Clarence Clarity chronology
NO NOW (2015)	Think: Peace (2018)

Singles from No Now
- 1. "Meadow Hopping, Traffic Stopping, Death Splash" Released: 26 Jan 2015; 2. "Will to Believe" Released: 9 Mar 2015

No Now (stylized as NO NOW) is the debut studio album by English musician Clarence Clarity. It was released on 2 March 2015 on the Bella Union label.

== Background ==
Clarity had gained notability among the music community for his previous releases, 2013's Save †hyself EP and 2014's Who Am Eye EP, both of which featured tracks that reappeared on No Now.

No Now was Clarity's first full-length album under the Clarence Clarity name. In an interview with DIY Magazine he stated that "I just wanted to make it the biggest, boldest statement that I could possibly make." He claimed that the LP took years to create and that his previous EPs were "bitesize [sic] clarity".

Clarity expressed in the press release for the album that the album was his "bubble of clarity", and that it was "the exorcism of everything I’ve ever learned. It’s all left me now – no more human condition left to give. This is the album I’ve had to make. And now I can bow out ungracefully – Creator and destroyer of my own worlds."

== Reception ==
The Guardian gave the album praise, saying it sounded "like funk played by a swarm of bees" and that it was "almost as good as Clarence Clarity thinks it is," also drawing comparison to much of Prince's output. Consequence of Sound drew a similar comparison, stating "We've seen shades of his messianic act before. Prince is one touchstone, both for his larger-than-life persona and his willingness", calling No Now a "rollercoaster of an album". DIY gave it 4 stars, claiming Clarence is "currently without an equal" and describing his music as polarizing.

== Track listing ==
All tracks are written by Clarence Clarity.

No.	Title	Length
1.	"Become Death"	0:58
2.	"Will to Believe"	4:10
3.	"Alive in the Septic Tank"	3:14
4.	"Buck-Toothed Particle Smashers" (featuring Kill J)	3:37
5.	"Hit Factory of Sadness"	1:19
6.	"Off My Grid"	4:15
7.	"Those Who Can't, Cheat"	4:05
8.	"Let's Shoot Up"	3:59
9.	"Bloodbarf"	2:44
10.	"Tathāgatagarbha (Note: Whilst this track sounds like pure silence, it actually consists of an extremely quiet voice reciting "kill" as a text to speech voice recites mysterious coordinates backwards.)"	0:23
11.	"Meadow Hopping, Traffic Stopping, Death Splash"	3:05
12.	"Porn Mountain"	4:33
13.	"One Hand Washes the Other"	3:16
14.	"The Cute"	2:09
15.	"1-800-WORSHIP"	4:30
16.	"The Gospel Truth"	3:43
17.	"No Now"	1:31
18.	"Cancer™ in the Water"	3:26
19.	"With No Fear"	6:05
20.	"Now I Am"	1:13
Total length:		62:24

Japanese bonus tracks (Note: It is unknown if these tracks were actually released alongside the album in Japan, even to the album's creator, Clarence Clarity. He eventually released them online as a free download due to this confusion.)
No.	Title	Length
21.	"Once in the Styx"	3:57
22.	"Spinner"	3:28
Total length:		69:50
