= Five Star Generals =

Album by Hostyle Gospel

Mixtape by Hostyle Gospel
- Released: 2008
- Genre: Hip hop, Christian hip hop, crunk, Christian rap, hardcore hip hop, gangsta rap
- Label: Hostyle Gospel Ministries
- Producer: King Son, Proverb, Big Job

Hostyle Gospel chronology
| Five Star Generals (2008) | The Calm (2012) |

Five Star Generals is the third mixtape by the Christian hip hop group Hostyle Gospel, released by Hostyle Gospel Ministries in 2008.

== Reception ==
Professional ratings
Review scores
| Source | Rating |
|---|---|
| Journal of Gospel | 4/5 stars |

In a four star review by Journal of Gospel, Bob Marovich wrote, "Five Star Generals is well produced and engineered. Of course the language on Five Star Generals is metaphorical, but there's no denying the group's tough-talking, no-holds-barred stance. These guys aren't playing around. They have fashioned themselves into spiritual superheroes declaring all-out street war on the demons who have encircled and imprisoned Christians. These guys have God's back, and visa versa."

A review in Louder Than The Music said, "Five Star Generals hooks and lyrics were more forceful and came across as angry in some of their tracks."

== Track listing ==
| No. | Title | Length |
|---|---|---|
| 1. | "Intro" |
| 2. | "The Boss" |
| 3. | "Dey Know" |
| 4. | "Get the Oil on Him" |
| 5. | "The Slave and the Master" |
| 6. | "Get Buck" |
| 7. | "Every Nose Remix" |
| 8. | "Forever" |
| 9. | "Dream On" |
| 10. | "He Dont Get a Thing" |
| 11. | "A Milli" |
