= Flame (Sundara Karma song) =

Single by Sundara Karma

from the album Youth Is Only Ever Fun in Retrospect
- B-side: "Flame (Roosevelt remix)"
- Released: 4 June 2015; 11 November 2016 (re-issue)
- Recorded: January–February 2015
- Genre: Indie rock; pop rock
- Length: 3:46
- Label: Sony Music; Chess Club
- Songwriter(s): Joe Janiak; Oscar Pollock
- Producer(s): Nick Watson

Sundara Karma singles chronology
"Loveblood" (2015)	"Flame" (2015)	"Vivienne" (2015)

Music video
- "Flame" on YouTube

"Flame" is a song by English band Sundara Karma. It was originally released on 4 June 2015 as a standalone single, and re-released on 11 November 2016 as the lead single for their debut studio album, Youth Is Only Ever Fun in Retrospect on Sony Music via RCA imprint Chess Club Records.

== Critical reception ==
In 2015 review, George O'Brien praised the track, calling the track "punchy", and the band "picking up where they left off" with their first extended play.

== Music video ==
The original music video came out on 7 July 2015. The second music video for the re-released single came out on 26 December 2016.

== In other media ==
"Flame" appears in the EA Sports FIFA 18 soundtrack.

== Track listing ==
All music is composed by Sundara Karma; except where otherwise noted

No.	Title	Music	Length
1.	"Flame"	Ally Baty; Dom Cordell; Haydn Evans; Matt Maltese; Oscar Pollock	3:46
2.	"Flame (Roosevelt remix)"	Marius Lauber; Pollock	4:42

== Credits and personnel ==
The following individuals were credited with the recording, composition, and mastering of the track.

Sundara Karma

- Ally Baty — Guitar
- Dom Cordell — Bass
- Haydn Evans — Drums
- Matt Maltese — Piano
- Oscar Pollock — Guitar, vocals

Recording and mastering

- Lucas Donaud — Artwork, design
- Jasmine Igoe — Photography
- Emma Viola Lilja — Photography
- Phil Smithies — Photography
- Nick Watson — Mastering
