= Youth Is Only Ever Fun in Retrospect =

Debut studio album by English band Sundara Karma

Studio album by Sundara Karma
- Released: 6 January 2017
- Genre: Indie rock; new wave; synth-pop; pop rock
- Length: 47:30
- Label: Sony Music; Chess Club

Sundara Karma chronology
Loveblood (2016)	Youth Is Only Ever Fun in Retrospect (2017)	Ulfilas' Alphabet (2019)

Singles from Youth Is Only Ever Fun in Retrospect
- 1. "A Young Understanding" Released: 26 February 2016; 2. "She Said" Released: 23 August 2016; 3. "Olympia" Released: 20 October 2016; 4. "Flame" Released: 11 November 2016; 5. "Happy Family" Released: 16 December 2016

Professional ratings
Aggregate scores
Source	Rating
Metacritic	67/100
Review scores
Source	Rating
Clash Mag	8/10
The Line of Best Fit	8/10

Youth Is Only Ever Fun in Retrospect is the debut studio album by English band Sundara Karma. It was released in January 2017 under Chess Club Records. In 2020, the album was certified Silver in the UK after achieving sales of over 60,000.

== Track listing ==
No.	Title	Length
1.	"A Young Understanding"	4:03
2.	"Loveblood"	3:47
3.	"Olympia"	4:11
4.	"Happy Family"	6:02
5.	"Flame"	3:48
6.	"Lose the Feeling"	4:13
7.	"She Said"	3:44
8.	"Vivienne"	3:49
9.	"Be Nobody"	2:50
10.	"Deep Relief"	3:42
11.	"Watching From Great Heights"	2:57
12.	"The Night"	4:24
Total length:		47:30

== Charts ==
Chart	Peak position
UK Albums (OCC)	24

== Accolades ==
Publication	Accolade	Rank	Ref.
Gigwise	Top 51 Albums of 2017	37	
