= Skittles & Iced Tea =

Single by Hostyle Gospel featuring John Givez
- Released: April 19, 2016
- Recorded: 2016
- Genre: Christian hip hop
- Length: 4:06
- Label: Hostyle Gospel Ministries
- Songwriter(s): Hostyle Gospel, John Givez
- Producer(s): Hostyle Gospel Ministries

Hostyle Gospel featuring John Givez singles chronology
"Break" (2013)	"Skittles & Iced Tea" (2016)	"Clap" (2016)

Music video
- "Skittles & Iced Tea" on YouTube

"Skittles & Iced Tea" is a single by Christian hip hop artist Hostyle Gospel featuring John Givez, released on April 19, 2016. The idea of the "Skittles & Iced Tea" song came from the Trayvon Martin/George Zimmerman case. Martin was shot and killed on the way home from a local store to buy Skittles and iced tea. This song represents the freedom, liberty, justice and everything else that the constitution stands for.

== See also ==
- Killing of Trayvon Martin
