= Immortal Combat (album) =

Studio album by Hostyle Gospel
- Released: January 11, 2011
- Genres: Hip hop, Christian hip hop, crunk, Christian rap, hardcore hip hop, gangsta rap
- Length: 1:15:00
- Label: Hostyle Gospel Ministries
- Producers: King Son, Proverb, Big Job, King Soloman, Samuel Shaw

Hostyle Gospel chronology
Let Me At Em (2007)	Immortal Combat (2011)	Desperation (2013)

Immortal Combat is the second album from Hostyle Gospel. Hostyle Gospel Ministries released the project on January 11, 2011. Hostyle Gospel Ministries worked with Samuel Shaw and Jarrett Johnson on the production of this album.

== Reception ==
Professional ratings
Review scores
Source	Rating
Cross Rhythms	6/10 stars
Louder Than The Music	4/5 stars
Holy Culture	4.7 stars on a 10 point scale

Specifying in a six-star review (out of 10) by Cross Rhythms, Steve Hayes responds, "The album moves across hip-hop territory through Midwest, east, west, old skool and beyond." Jono Davies, indicating in a four star review from Louder Than The Music, realizing, "If you're looking for an album that is dynamic, with interesting lyrics and pounding beats that would fit on any mainstream hip hop album, Immortal Combat might be an album worth trying." Neil Christian, writes in a 4.7 out of 10 stars review from Holy Culture, replying, "what Hostyle Gospel has done, is create an album cover that personifies the album’s theme. You already know what the message is without hearing a single bar of the album. The image of four guys, dressed in khakis, hoisting the cross with heavy exertion on their faces, immediately conveys the idea that we are in a war. We are in a war against the world and the secular music industry that is promoting sin heavily. We are in a war against sin and against our flesh."

== Track listing ==
No.	Title	Length
1.	"Welcome to the show"	5:10
2.	"Thanks for comin’ out"	3:24
3.	"Move"	4:46
4.	"Coming Back Again"	4:06
5.	"King Soloman’s Letter"	1:48
6.	"Tell a Story"	3:33
7.	"Get Yo C’s Up"	3:21
8.	"War zone"	4:02
9.	"Get Yo Bible Out"	3:40
10.	"Pass The Mic"	4:07
11.	"Proverbs Letter"	1:58
12.	"Somebody’s Father"	3:46
13.	"Souljas"	3:44
14.	"Give It to Me Now"	3:29
15.	"Big Job’s Letter"	1:02
16.	"Christian VIP"	4:39
17.	"DHB"	4:50
18.	"Tell Satan It’s On"	4:09
19.	"Immortal Combat"	1:21
20.	"Calling Out to You"	4:07
21.	"Glory"	3:58
Total length:		1:15:00

=== Music Videos ===
- "Coming Back Again" featuring Jarrett Johnson from Chapter 6 (band)

== Personnel ==
=== Performance ===
- Hostyle Gospel - primary artists

==== Featured artists ====
- Jarrett Johnson from Chapter 6 (band)

=== Production and engineering ===
- Fontaine Pizza - engineer, producer
- Raynard Glass - engineer, producer
- Demetrius Morton - producer
- King Son - producer
- Samuel Shaw - producer

=== Wardrobe ===
- Leslie Leyhe - wardrobe
- Tim Leyhe - wardrobe

=== Packaging ===
- Yolanda Glass - photography
- Omari Thomas - graphic Design
