= The Torch (St. John's University) =

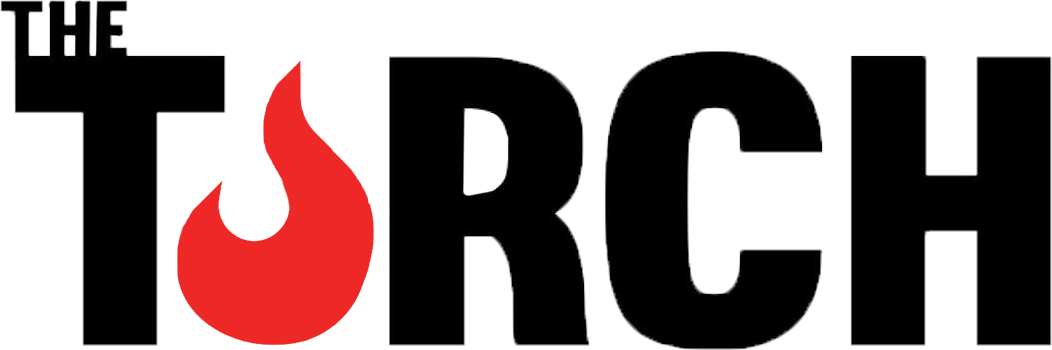
- Type: Weekly student newspaper
- Format: Broadsheet
- Editor-in-chief: Dayra Santana
- Managing editor: Jillian Ortiz
- Founded: 1922; 104 years ago
- Language: English
- Headquarters: St. John's University; 8000 Utopia Parkway O'Connor B-Level; Queens, New York 11439
- Website: torchonline.com

The Torch is the official student-run newspaper of St. John's University in Queens, New York. Founded in 1922 and published in 1925, the paper had shifted in and out of financial control of the University before ultimately being fully independent since 1980. In 1988, The Torch was inducted into the Associated Collegiate Press Hall of Fame after being awarded several awards from various collegiate newspaper organizations. During the 2006–2007 academic year, The Torch won several awards from the New York Press Association and American Scholastic Press Association, including second place in General Excellence from the NYPA.

== History ==
For a period of time in the 20th century, The Torch was not the only publication at St. John's, with St. John's News being published in 1937. On September 28, 1960, St. John's News began publishing as The Downtowner and eventually was discontinued some time in the 1980s.

After the 2005–2006 academic year, The Torch was awarded four awards from the American Scholastic Press Association, including "Most Outstanding University Newspaper", scoring 970 points out of a possible 1000. It was the first batch of awards the newspaper had won since the early 1990s. Despite the newspaper's apparent success under then Editor-in-Chief Albert Silvestri, Pasqualina and the editors of The Torch felt the need to execute drastic design changes for the upcoming academic year.

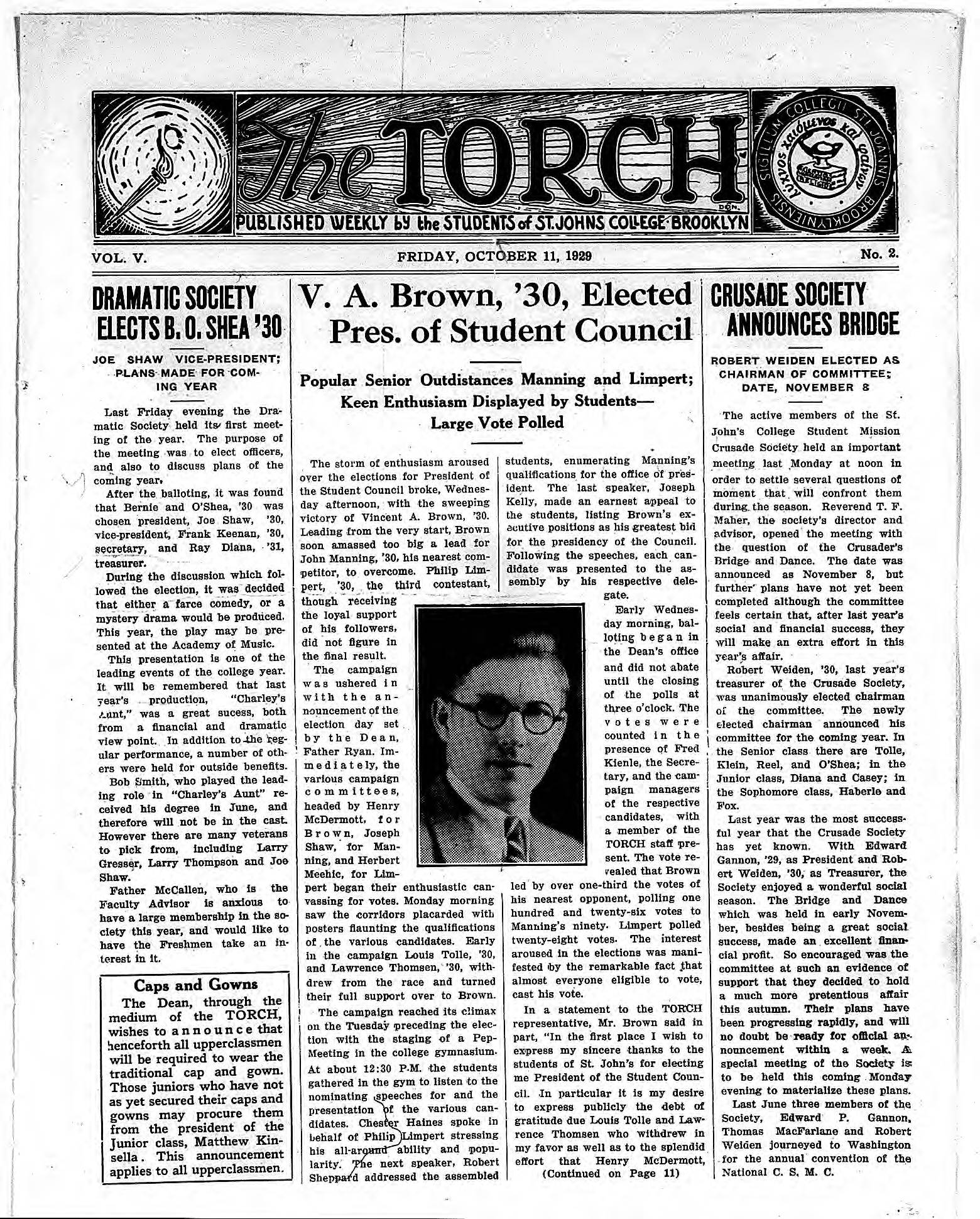
The front page of the October 11, 1929 issue of the Torch.

In January 2006, The Torch featured a cover asking a then-poignant question on the University's campus: "Would you want St. John's University to host The Vagina Monologues?" The campus remained divided on the question throughout the remainder of the Spring semester and the controversy garnered attention from major New York newspapers, including the New York Post. In April of the same year, The Torch featured a cover story concerning the University's decision to invite rapper Ludacris to perform on campus. Then Editor-in-Chief Stephen Pasqualina criticized the University for the decision in his opinion column, "The Brazen Word", explaining "The audacious hypocrisy of this University's administration is beyond words." The University, perhaps agreeing that the decision was inconsistent with their January one, decided to not invite Ludacris to campus. The Ludacris controversy again garnered major media attention, as several local community newspapers, the New York Post, and XXL featured stories on the University's "rap flap." The decision to renege on the Ludacris invitation immediately preceded the Don Imus-Rutger's women's basketball team controversy, which put rappers like Ludacris under fire for their lyrical vulgarity.

That same month, The Torch won seven awards, including four from the New York Press Association. The awards included 2nd place for General Excellence, 1st place for Design, 2nd place for Sport Coverage, and Pasqualina's column won 1st place among collegiate newspaper columns in New York. The American Scholastic Press Association awarded the newspaper with "First Place with Special Merit", as the newspaper earned 980 out of a possible 1000 points for overall excellence. The Association also awarded the paper "Best Overall Photography" for their 2006 Courtside edition, an annual Torch publication exclusively covering men's and women's basketball at the University. Christopher Lauto's work as Layout Editor also garnered the paper a national cover design award from the prestigious national membership organization for college student journalists, the Associated Collegiate Press.

On July 3, 2006, The Torch debuted its new masthead, which features a "T" written in Hoefler text font with two flames located in the top right corner of a red box. The masthead was designed by Nick Nisco, who was, at the time, a graphic design student at the Fashion Institute of Technology. In addition to the masthead changes, the newspaper made changes regarding paper stock and printing services, employing the services of Five Star Printing located in Jamaica, NY. The newspaper also debuted a completely revamped layout, featuring more color photographs, more student-produced cartoons, and an apparent emphasis on white/negative space. Central to the improvement in appearance was, according to Pasqualina, tighter kerning rules, making the text on the page take up less space than it had in years past.

A few front covers of The Torch from the 2006–2007 production year.

Gregory Leporati was elected during March 2007 and formally brought on board in April. His managerial board consisted of mostly fresh faces, which made the first two issues of their reign a learning process. Leporati, a Senior English major at St. John's, began his career at The Torch during the second semester of his freshman year (2005–2006), during which he became a staff writer. When Michael E. Cunniff became Editor-in-Chief in April 2012, one of the first improvements he made in the newspaper was the creation of the Lifestyle section. The section combined the Features and Entertainment section – the latter previously known as Inferno - under one name. The section had a different feel from the rest of the paper and evolved over the course of the Editorial Board's tenure.

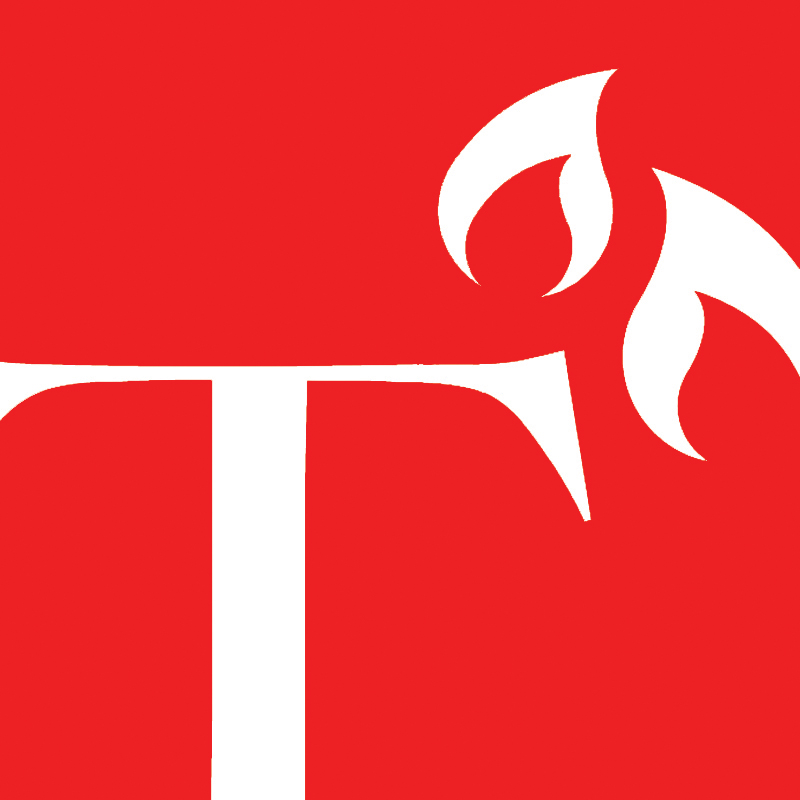
A retired Torch logo.

In October 2012, Rev. Donald J. Harrington, C.M., President of the University took the stand in the federal trial of disgraced St. John's ex-dean Cecilia Chang. The Torch reported that according to court transcripts, Harrington testified that he met with Chang two or three times a year and "wasn't real comfortable" with gifts that he received while on trips to Asia from potential donors. On November 6, 2012, Cecilia Chang was found dead in her Jamaica Estates home from apparent suicide. The Torch covered the development in its special 2012 Election issue. A week later, Harrington sat down for an exclusive interview with The Torch where he went into more detail about his stopover trips in Hawaii and his relationship with Chang.
