= I Am Not the One =

Single by Hostyle Gospel
- Released: January 3, 2020
- Recorded: 2019
- Genre: Christian hip hop
- Length: 4:47
- Label: Hostyle Gospel Ministries
- Songwriter(s): Hostyle Gospel

Hostyle Gospel singles chronology
"Clap" (2016)	"I Am Not the One" (2020)

"I Am Not the One" is a 2020 single released by Christian hip hop group Hostyle Gospel on January 3, 2020. The single "challenges the world's point of view that looked at Christians as weak because of grace and mercy that they give to people, and change it to motivating fellow believers to operate in the power of their calling."

== Reception ==
Professional ratings
Review scores
Source	Rating
Louder Than The Music	"

Jono Davies from Louder Than The Music gave the album 5 stars out of 5, calling the track "solid" and talking about how the "energy" was the "biggest draw" to the track. He also discussed the "pulse-pounding rhythms and raw lyrics" and how the group "ignit[ed] a fire of passion for God across America".
