= Let Me At Em =

Studio album by Hostyle Gospel
- Released: May 30, 2007
- Genre: Hip hop, Christian hip hop, crunk, Christian rap, hardcore hip hop, gangsta rap
- Length: 57:36
- Label: Hostyle Gospel Ministries
- Producer: King Son, Proverb, Big Job

Hostyle Gospel chronology
Let Me At Em (2007)	Immortal Combat (2011)

Let Me At Em is the first album by the Christian hip hop group Hostyle Gospel. Hostyle Gospel Ministries released this project on May 30, 2007.

== Reception ==
Professional ratings
Review scores
Source	Rating
Cross Rhythms	8/10 stars

In an eight star review by Cross Rhythms, David Ashley wrote, "Listen carefully and the beats are innovative and quite a break from the ordinary." The Let Me At Em album gave fans a first look at the group's signature sound described as battle music.

== Track listing ==
No.	Title	Length
1.	"Intro"	2:10
2.	"Mean Mug"	3:21
3.	"Live and Die in the Name"	3:27
4.	"Hollywood"	4:11
5.	"Champs"	4:01
6.	"Top of the Mountain"	4:23
7.	"Let Me At Em"	3:13
8.	"Freestyle"	0:25
9.	"Castdown Castaway"	4:10
10.	"Tomorrow Never Comes"	3:43
11.	"Battlefield Chronicles"	4:13
12.	"Armed Robbery Pt.2"	3:07
13.	"Cold World"	3:33
14.	"How Many Days"	4:44
15.	"Jesus Invented Crunk"	3:52
16.	"Let Me At Em (Extended Studio Track)"	5:03
Total length:		57:36

=== Music videos ===
- "Mean Mug"
