= Clarence Clarity =

British singer-songwriter and record producer

- Born: Adam Mark Crisp; 30 May 1985 (age 41); London, England
- Genres: Glitch pop; experimental pop; hyperpop; alternative R&B; electropop; wonky
- Instruments: Voice; synthesiser; guitar; bass; drums
- Years active: 2002–present
- Labels: Bella Union; Deluxe Pain; 37 Adventures
- Website: clarenceclarity.com

Adam Mark Crisp (born c. 1985), known by the stage name Clarence Clarity, is an English singer, songwriter, producer and musician. He has been praised for his unique, eclectic pop sound which was described by The Guardian as "funk played by a swarm of bees". In addition to his own music he has produced for acts including Rina Sawayama, Dorian Electra, and Sundara Karma.

== Background ==
Crisp was born in London and raised in Yateley and Fleet, Hampshire. He played with several bands and under several aliases prior to Clarence Clarity, mostly known for his releases with the band Elle Milano from the mid-to-late 2000s, and his work under the name Entrepreneurs until the early 2010s. Elle Milano broke up in 2008 after the death of Crisp's mother, while the Entrepreneurs name was retired in favour of Clarence Clarity.

Early into his career as Clarence Clarity, Crisp was noted for his high degree of anonymity, preferring not to talk about his previous work and giving false and absurd information in press releases, such as stating that he was from Fiji, that he ate mud or that he was 7 feet tall; this misinformation led to rumours, such that his music was a new Jai Paul project. When asked about this by The Guardian, he replied with "I've got a musical history, and I suppose I don't want to have to justify why certain things in the past haven't taken off. I've wiped the slate clean a couple of times. It all feels necessary to have got here." Despite the similarity, Crisp has stated that his stage name was not overtly influenced by the meme template 'Sudden Clarity Clarence'.

== Career ==
=== Early career: 2002–2012 ===
==== Psirens: 2002–2004 ====
Psirens was a band formed in 2002 by Crisp and James Headley. It quickly splintered into several other bands, and was soon retired as a project.

==== Elle Milano: 2004–2008 ====
Elle Milano was formed in 2004, as one of the bands formed from the members of Psirens. It consisted of Crisp, Headley, and Chloe Dunford. They released an EP, three singles, and their only album Acres Of Dead Space Cadets on Brighton Electric. After the release of Acres in 2008, the band went on tour, but cancelled most of the shows early into the tour. Soon after, the band announced their split, releasing a final EP off-label onto their Myspace.

==== Entrepreneurs, The Premarital Sect, The Super-Ego and FOE: 2008–2012 ====
Following the disbanding of Elle Milano, Crisp began producing electronica under the name Entrepreneurs. Under Entrepreneurs, he began working with the label Stella Mortos, releasing the double A-side single "Hunting Roger Rabbit / Six Severed Hates". On 10 August 2010, he released the EP Uv Been Robbed (Joking, But Not) independently on Bandcamp. He released another double A-side, "Bubblegunk / Fuck Tactics", on London label Fear & Records in 2011.

Crisp produced music with vocalist Hannah Lou Clark under the name FOE, providing production for her 2012 album, Bad Dream Hotline. Around this time he was also involved in a punk band, The Premarital Sect, and produced hip-hop instrumentals under the name The Super-Ego using Ableton Live. He also mastered 7" single "Good Girl / Amazing Discovery" for Surrey six-piece Wildeflower in 2012.

=== Clarence Clarity: 2012–present ===
His first release under the name "Clarence Clarity" was 4GODSLUV in 2012, and he subsequently released his debut EP Save †hyself on the 37 Adventures label in late 2013. In December 2014, Clarity released his second EP, Who Am Eye, now on the Bella Union label. The EP cover featured his face (albeit with a distorted mouth), serving as the first time he had shown his face under the name. In March 2015, he released his first full-length album, No Now, and also performed a session at Maida Vale Studios for Huw Stephens on BBC Radio 1. In 2016, Clarity released a single with Pizza Boy, "Splitting Hairs", and the SAME EP, which consists of the titular track "SAME" repeated 5 times.

During 2017, Clarity helped produce Rina Sawayama's debut mini-album, Rina. He also began releasing singles with minimal or no advertising, such as "Fold 'Em" and "Naysayer Godslayer". He continued this trend into 2018, as it was revealed that he was working on a project which was widely believed to be called Leave Earth. In September 2018, the album title was revealed to be labelled Think: Peace, and was released independently on his Deluxe Pain label on 4 October 2018. This album featured many of the previously released singles in remixed forms. Clarity also revealed that Leave Earth was actually a compilation playlist consisting of all his singles released from 2016 to 2018, and continued to release singles for this playlist in pairs up until 31 December that year, finishing by releasing "Leave Earth" and "Sob Story".

In March 2020, Clarity released an ambient album, Dead Screen Scrolls, as a pay-what-you-want on Bandcamp; only an hour prior announcing an album was to be released for the first Bandcamp Friday (where all processing fees were to be waived for a day). Later in 2020, on 5 June, Clarity announced that he was releasing the mixtape Aerobic Exercise for the next 24 hours only, donating the proceeds to charity as it was a Bandcamp Friday. He would later put the mixtape back up for purchase permanently, alongside a second mixtape, Your Wrong, to coincide with the Bandcamp Friday in February 2021.

Clarity was the primary producer of Rina Sawayama's debut album, Sawayama which released in April 2020 to critical acclaim. Later that year, he also co-produced the songs "Iron Fist" and "Give Great Thanks" for Dorian Electra's second album My Agenda, and produced the entirety of Sundara Karma's fourth EP, Kill Me.

During a Reddit AMA in 2019, Clarity announced the title of his next album would be Midieval Europe. He also said that the project would be much shorter than his previous albums. In an April 2021 interview with Sonemic, Clarity stated that the project would not be titled Midieval Europe and that it would be released in three parts: an extended play followed by an album and another extended play. The first of these, Vanishing Act I: No Nouns, released in September 2021. Additionally in 2021, Clarity produced Rina Sawayama's cover of the song "Enter Sandman" for the charity compilation The Metallica Blacklist, and collaborated with her on a remix of the Lady Gaga song "Free Woman" for Gaga's remix album, Dawn of Chromatica.

In 2022, Clarity provided production for Sundara Karma's fifth EP, Oblivion! He also released the instrumentals to Vanishing Act I on 17 March, and released the sequel to his 2021 mixtape Your Wrong, titled Your Wrong To, to coincide with that May's Bandcamp Friday.

Clarity's third studio album Vanishing Act II: Ultimate Reality, a sequel to 2021's Vanishing Act I, released on 4 October 2024.

== Discography ==
=== Studio albums ===
Title	Album details
No Now	Released: 2 March 2015; Label: Bella Union; Formats: Digital download / CD / 12" Vinyl
Think: Peace	Released: 4 October 2018; Label: Deluxe Pain; Formats: Digital download
Vanishing Act II: Ultimate Reality	Released: 4 October 2024; Label: Deluxe Pain; Formats: Digital download

=== Mixtapes ===
Title	Mixtape Details
Dead Screen Scrolls (Ambient Works, Vol. 1)	Released: 20 March 2020; Label: Deluxe Pain; Formats: Digital download
Aerobic Exorcise	Released: 5 June 2020; Label: Self-Released; Formats: Digital download
Your Wrong	Released: 5 February 2021; Label: Self-Released; Formats: Digital download
Your Wrong To	Released: 6 May 2022; Label: Self-Released; Formats: Digital download
Your3 Wrong	Released: 3 August 2023; Label: Self-Released; Formats: Digital download

=== Extended plays ===
Title	EP Details
Save Thyself	Released: 17 September 2013; Label: 37 Adventures; Formats: Digital download, 12" Single
Who Am Eye	Released: 2 December 2014; Label: Bella Union; Formats: Digital download, 12" Single
Vanishing Act I: No Nouns	Released: 23 September 2021; Label: Deluxe Pain; Formats: Digital download

=== Compilations ===
Title	Compilation Details
Leave Earth (2016-2018)	Released: 31 December 2018; Label: Deluxe Pain / Self-Released; Formats: Digital download

=== Singles ===
Title	Year	Album
"4GODSLUV"	2012	Non-album singles
"KADYクソPERRY"	2012	Non-album singles
"Alive in the Septic Tank"	2013	Save Thyself
"The Gospel Truth"	2013	Save Thyself
"Those Who Can't, Cheat"	2014	Who Am Eye
"Buck-Toothed Particle Smashers" (ft. Kill J)	2015	No Now
"Will to Believe"	2015	No Now
"Cancer™ In The Water" (A.J. Crew edit)	2016	Non-album singles
"Splitting Hairs" (ft. Pizza Boy)	2016	Non-album singles
"Vapid Feels Are Vapid"	2016	Think:Peace
"Same"	2016	Think:Peace
"Now I Am Become Death" (Vocal Version)	2016	Non-album singles
"W€ CHANG€"	2017	Think: Peace
"Fold 'Em" (ft. Shadi)	2017	Think: Peace
"Naysayer Godslayer"	2017	Think: Peace
"Next Best Thing"	2018	Think: Peace
"Adam & The Evil" (ft. Pizza Boy)	2018	Think: Peace
"Your Secrets" (with Kai Whiston)	2018	Kai Whiston Bitch
"Rafters" (ft. A.J. Crew)	2018	Leave Earth
"1985"	2018	Leave Earth
"Telenovela"	2018	Leave Earth
"Del Rey Dreamhouse"	2018	Leave Earth
"Untrust In Us Together"	2018	Leave Earth
"Anthropic Principles"	2018	Leave Earth
"Bipolar Rainbows"	2018	Leave Earth
"Deafening Red"	2018	Leave Earth
"Sob Story"	2018	Leave Earth
"Leave Earth"	2018	Leave Earth

=== Songwriting and production credits ===
Title	Year	Artist	Album
"Ballad for the Brainkeepers"	2012	FOE	Bad Dream Hotline
"Mother May I?"	2012	FOE	Bad Dream Hotline
"Jailhouse"	2012	FOE	Bad Dream Hotline
"Tyrant Song"	2012	FOE	Bad Dream Hotline
"A Handsome Stranger Called Death"	2012	FOE	Bad Dream Hotline
"Get Money"	2012	FOE	Bad Dream Hotline
"The Black Lodge"	2012	FOE	Bad Dream Hotline
"Genie in a Coke Can"	2012	FOE	Bad Dream Hotline
"Ode to Janey Lou"	2012	FOE	Bad Dream Hotline
"Dance & Weep"	2012	FOE	Bad Dream Hotline
"Cold Hard Rock"	2012	FOE	Bad Dream Hotline
"Bad Dream Hotline"	2012	FOE	Bad Dream Hotline
"Valentine (What's It Gonna Be?)"	2018	Rina Sawayama	Non-album single
"Ordinary Superstar"	2018	Rina Sawayama	Rina
"Cyber Stockholm Syndrome"	2018	Rina Sawayama	Rina
"Alterlife"	2018	Rina Sawayama	Rina
"10-20-40"	2018	Rina Sawayama	Rina
"Take Me as I Am"	2018	Rina Sawayama	Rina
"Time Out (Interlude)"	2018	Rina Sawayama	Rina
"Cherry"	2018	Rina Sawayama	Non-album singles
"Flicker"	2018	Rina Sawayama	Non-album singles
"Mannequin"	2018	HMLTD	Hate Music Last Time Delete EP
"Apple of My Eye"	2018	HMLTD	Hate Music Last Time Delete EP
"Thirsty (For Love)"	2020	Dorian Electra	Non-album single
"Dynasty"	2020	Rina Sawayama	Sawayama
"XS"	2020	Rina Sawayama	Sawayama
"STFU!"	2020	Rina Sawayama	Sawayama
"Akasaka Sad"	2020	Rina Sawayama	Sawayama
"Paradisin'"	2020	Rina Sawayama	Sawayama
"Fuck This World (Interlude)"	2020	Rina Sawayama	Sawayama
"Snakeskin"	2020	Rina Sawayama	Sawayama
"Give Great Thanks"	2020	Dorian Electra	My Agenda
"Kill Me"	2020	Sundara Karma	Kill Me
"O Stranger"	2020	Sundara Karma	Kill Me
"YOUR TOUCH"	2020	Sundara Karma	Kill Me
"Artifice"	2020	Sundara Karma	Kill Me
"Lifelines"	2020	Sundara Karma	Kill Me
"Minor Feelings"	2022	Rina Sawayama	Hold the Girl
"This Hell"	2022	Rina Sawayama	Hold the Girl
"Catch Me in the Air"	2022	Rina Sawayama	Hold the Girl
"Forgiveness"	2022	Rina Sawayama	Hold the Girl
"Your Age"	2022	Rina Sawayama	Hold the Girl
"Imagining"	2022	Rina Sawayama	Hold the Girl
"Frankenstein"	2022	Rina Sawayama	Hold the Girl
"Hurricanes"	2022	Rina Sawayama	Hold the Girl
"Phantom"	2022	Rina Sawayama	Hold the Girl
"Flavour of the Month"	2022	Rina Sawayama	Hold the Girl
"Symphony"	2023	Dorian Electra	Fanfare
"Freak Mode"	2023	Dorian Electra	Fanfare
"anon"	2023	Dorian Electra	Fanfare
"Wanna Be a Star"	2023	Dorian Electra	Fanfare
"Catch Me (Beautiful Fall)"	2023	twst	TWST0002 (Off-World)

=== Remixes ===
Title	Year	Artist
"Faith"	2014	I Break Horses
"Ladders"	2015	Archive
"Midnight Sun"	2015	Kate Boy
"Heartbreak Hi"	2016	Avec Sans
"Gone"	2019	Charli XCX and Christine and the Queens
"Free Woman"	2021	Lady Gaga, Rina Sawayama
"Unstoppable"	2022	Sia
