= This Hell =

Single by Rina Sawayama

from the album Hold the Girl
- Released: 18 May 2022
- Genre: Country pop; alt-pop; soft rock
- Length: 3:56
- Label: Dirty Hit
- Songwriters: Rina Sawayama; Paul Epworth; Vic Jamieson; Lauren Aquilina
- Producers: Clarence Clarity; Paul Epworth

Rina Sawayama singles chronology
"Follow Me" (2022)	"This Hell" (2022)	"Catch Me in the Air" (2022)

Music video
- "This Hell" on YouTube

"This Hell" is a song by Japanese singer Rina Sawayama from her second studio album, Hold the Girl (2022). It was released through Dirty Hit on 18 May 2022 as the lead single from the album. A country pop, alt-pop, and soft rock tune with a synth-rock groove and glam rock influences, "This Hell" was written by Sawayama, Paul Epworth, Vic Jamieson, and Lauren Aquilina, and produced by Clarence Clarity and Epworth.

== Background ==
In April 2020, Sawayama released her debut album, Sawayama. However, due to the COVID-19 pandemic, the Dynasty Tour was postponed twice. Sawayama teased her second album in late 2021, saying "Next year, late summer", and played a new song called "Catch Me in the Air" while announcing she was finishing her "even more personal" second album. On 16 May 2022, Sawayama announced her second album, Hold the Girl. On the 17th, one day after, she announced the lead single "This Hell" would release the day after. "This Hell" is the first solo song by Sawayama since "Lucid" was released in 2020.

== Composition ==
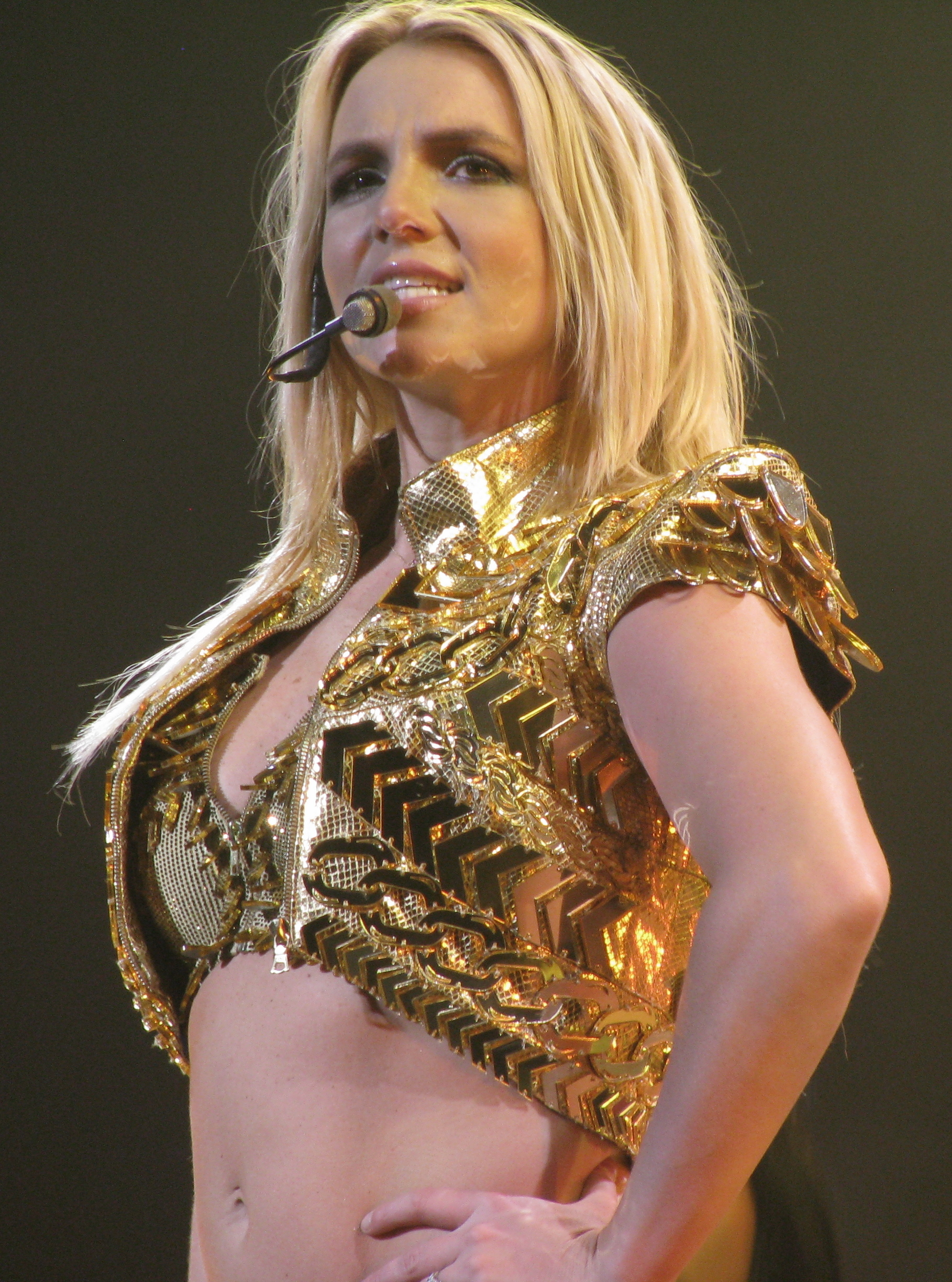
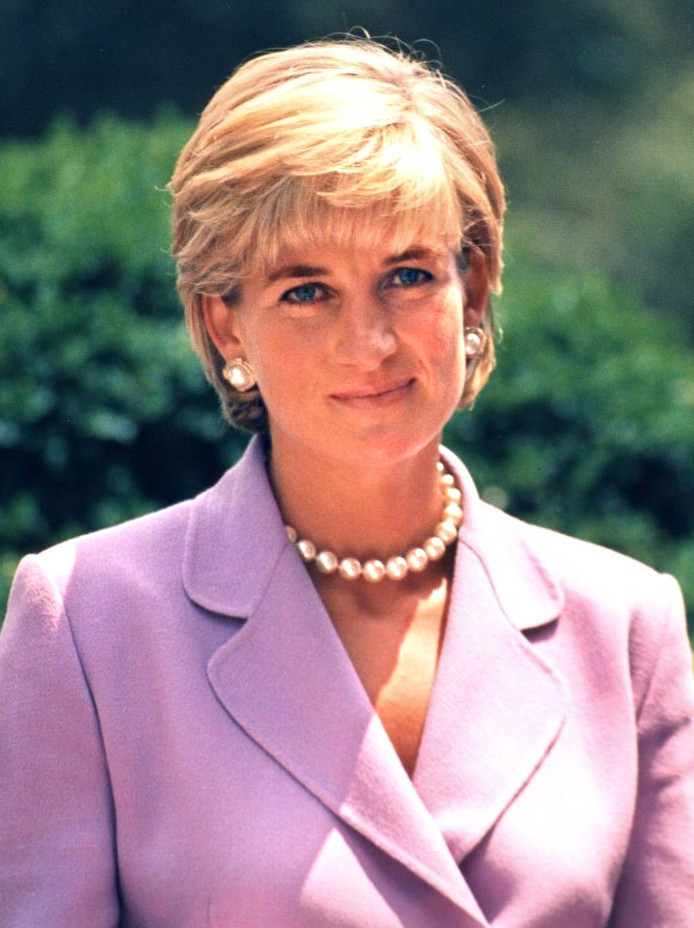
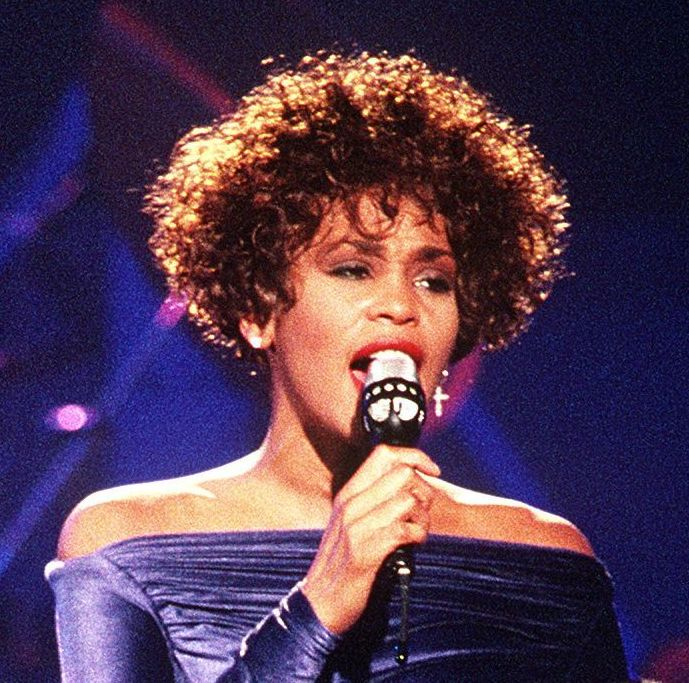
"This Hell" name-checks gay icons such as Britney Spears (left), Princess Diana (center), and Whitney Houston (right).

"This Hell" is a country pop, alt-pop, and soft rock track with a synth-rock groove and glam rock influences. It was produced by Paul Epworth and Clarence Clarity, and written by Sawayama alongside Vic Jamieson, Epworth, and Lauren Aquilina.

Sawayama has noted Dolly Parton and Kacey Musgraves as inspirations for "This Hell", as well as Shania Twain, whom Sawayama has described as "the queen of country pop".

Sawayama wrote "This Hell" while reflecting about attacks against LGBT people, which are often motivated by religious beliefs, stating, "When the world tells us we don't deserve love and protection, we have no choice but to give love and protection to each other". The song contains a guitar solo which was described as "over-the-top" by NPR. The singer makes references to some gay icons such as Britney Spears, Princess Diana, and Whitney Houston, and references Shania Twain’s "Man! I Feel Like a Woman!" with the beginning line, "Let's go, girls", as well as Paris Hilton's signature catchphrase "that's hot". Sawayama stated that she "put in as many iconic pop culture moments as I can, but the song is more than that."

Upon the song's release, Sawayama posted on Twitter that she "wanted to write a western pop song that celebrated COMMUNITY and LOVE in a time where the world seemed hellish."

== Music video ==
A music video for "This Hell" was described as "glitzy" by NME. The visual, directed by Ali Kaur, depicts the singer marrying two people in a lavish wedding, all while drinking, line-dancing, and playing air guitar. Adrian Garro for Rock Cellar Magazine noted that the video was released during gay pride month.

== Live performances ==
Sawayama performed "This Hell" on The Tonight Show Starring Jimmy Fallon. On October 30, 2022, Sawayama performed the song on British television dance contest Strictly Come Dancing.

== Personnel ==
- Rina Sawayama – performer, songwriter
- Paul Epworth – producer, songwriter
- Clarence Clarity – producer
- Lauren Aquilina – songwriter
- Vic Jamieson – songwriter

== Critical response ==
"This Hell" received critical acclaim. Rolling Stone listed "This Hell" as one of the best songs of 2022, placing it at number 15, and wrote: "Artists from other genres dabbling in country music is nothing new, but Sawayama does it better than nearly anyone here, proving she's just trying to have a good time — while also inspiring change." Billboard ranked named the 68th best song of the year.

== Charts ==
Chart performance for "This Hell"
Chart (2022)	Peak position
Japan Hot Overseas (Billboard Japan)	8

== Gyarupi remix ==
On April 12, 2024, a remix of "This Hell" featuring South Korean-Japanese rapper Chanmina was released exclusively on Spotify as part of their Spotify singles series. In regard to LGBT rights in Japan, Spotify partnered with Asahi Breweries for a campaign for awareness of same-sex marriage.
