= Clap (Hostyle Gospel song) =

Single by Hostyle Gospel featuring Gemstones
- Released: June 8, 2016
- Recorded: 2016
- Genre: Christian hip hop
- Length: 5:28
- Label: Hostyle Gospel Ministries
- Songwriter(s): Hostyle Gospel, Gemstones
- Producer(s): Tone Jonez

Hostyle Gospel featuring Gemstones singles chronology
"Skittles & Iced Tea" (2016)	"Clap" (2016)	"I Am Not The One" (2020)

Music video
- "Clap" on YouTube

"Clap" is the second single released by Christian hip hop artist Hostyle Gospel featuring Gemstones, released on June 8, 2016. "The track "Clap" was produced by Tone Jonez (Lecrae, This'l)." The concept encourage Christian believers to applaud through the form of clap no matter what they are facing in their lives. Gospel Music Historian, Bob Marovich, described the group lyrics as "strapped with their bible as a holy weapon they chant infectiously at demons.” The groups stated that "We are given so many reasons to be defeated and hold our heads low, but it is in those times when we are at our bottom, all alone that we have to "Clap" for and encourage ourselves. Wherever we may end up, we are able to "Clap" your way through".
