= Better Luck Next Time (band) =

American pop punk band

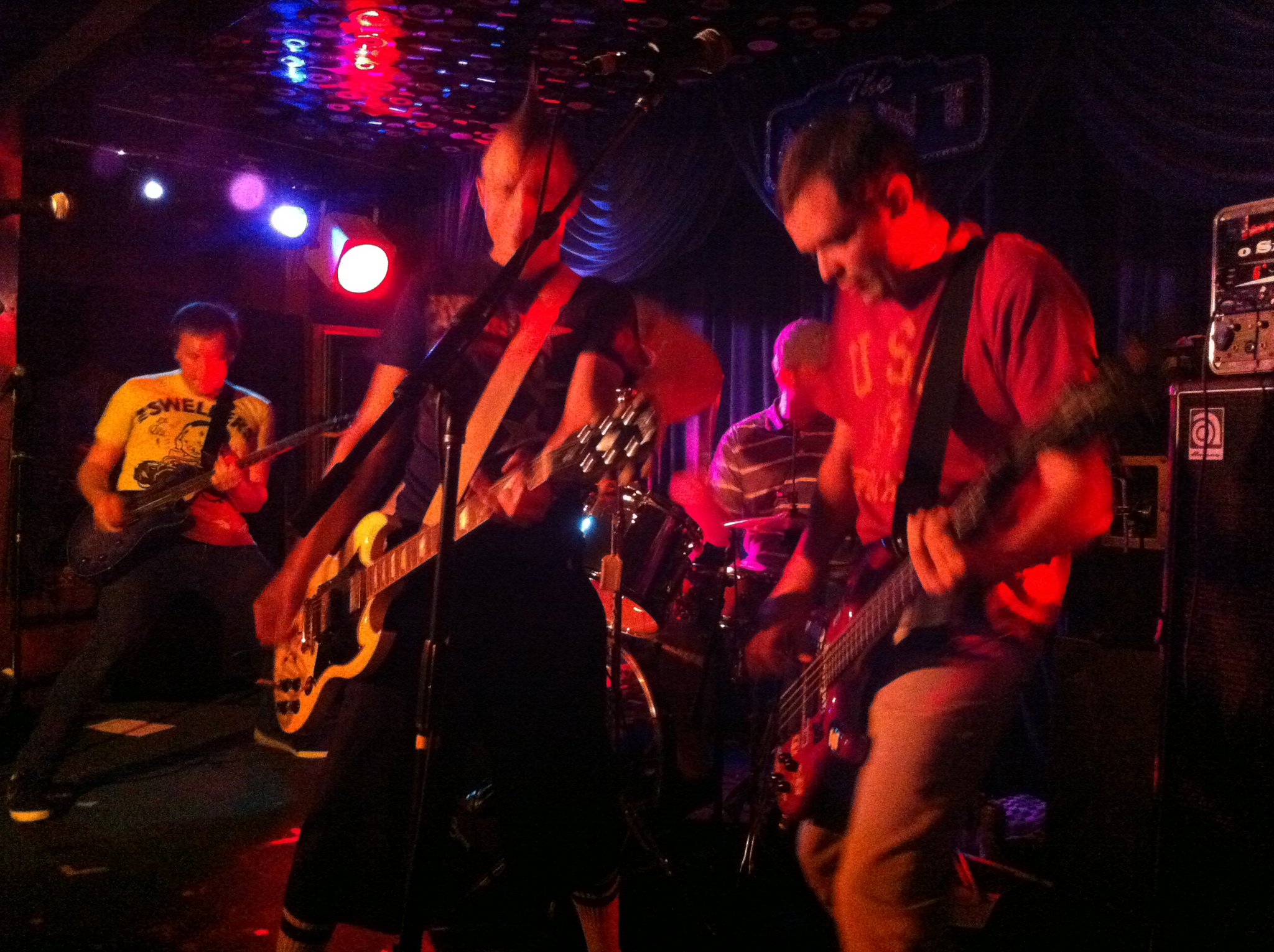
- Left to right: Travis, Brian, Chris, and Matt in 2011

Background information
- Origin: Los Angeles, California, United States
- Genres: Pop punk
- Years active: 2003 - 2014
- Labels: World Records (US); Kid Tested Records (US); InYa Face Records (Japan); Enemy One Records (Brazil)
- Members: Brian Bortoli; Matt Fuzzo; Travis Garrecht; Chris Lucas
- Past members: Leston Derrick; Danny Cassese; Joseph John; John Holzer
- Website: www.blnt.us

Better Luck Next Time (often shortened to BLNT) is a 4-piece American pop punk band from Los Angeles, California, United States. They have released four albums and one split EP since forming in 2003. Their fourth album, We'll Take it From Here, was released on October 16, 2013.

== History ==
=== Formation (2003–2005) ===
Better Luck Next Time was formed in 2003 by original members Brian Bortoli, Matt Fuzzo, Chris Lucas, and Leston Derrick. The band came to be when Brian was added to the line-up of Snapout (the current project of Matt, Chris, Leston, and John). The addition of Brian brought forth a change in musical style, thus the name Snapout was dropped and changed to Better Luck Next Time. The name Better Luck Next Time originated from Brian's ongoing attempts to further his musical career. The band decided to keep Better Luck Next Time a 4-piece and continued on without John. Both Leston and Brian were original lead singers, with both members switching off lead roles and often singing duets. Months after their formation, the band recorded their first demo CD in their practice studio after turning it into a fully functional recording studio. The demo featured four songs, all of which would later be re-recorded on the album Third Time's A Charm.

=== Third Time's A Charm (2005–2006) ===
The band decided to put together an album of all their material to that point, which ultimately became their debut album Third Time's A Charm. The title was intended to go hand-in-hand with the name of the band, Better Luck Next Time. Before recording started, they parted ways with Leston. Brian took over the role as sole lead vocalist going forward. The band held auditions to find a replacement lead guitarist, which led them to Danny Cassese. Just like their demo CD, Third Time's A Charm was recorded, engineered, and produced entirely by themselves. Following the recording, Danny decided to leave the band. In an attempt to fill the lead guitarist position, the band reached out to former Snapout guitarist, John.

Third Time's A Charm was self-released by the band in December 2005. It was sold at shows and through their website. Soon after the album was released, they decided to add a keyboard player to the band to give it a more dynamic sound. After only 1 audition, 5th member Joseph John was added to the line-up. Third Time's A Charm caught the attention of InYa Face Records in Tokyo, Japan, who signed the band and released it as a self-titled album in 2006. In October 2006, the band toured Japan for the first time, headlining @UNITED Vol. 2 – Tokyo's Melodic Attack in Shibuya at Club Quattro. The album hit Japanese Billboard at No. 19 on the Top 50 Charts, and was later declared the best selling foreign punk/emo record of 2006 in Japan. In September 2006, Better Luck Next Time was chosen as 1 of 10 local bands out of 2,500 in Southern California given the chance to play KROQ-FM's Inland Invasion, in which they placed 2nd. The winner was determined by the number of votes submitted by the station listeners. The song submitted for the contest was "T.G.I. Goodbye," in which a music video was also made.

=== Start From Skratch (2007–2008) ===
Following the International success of Third Time's A Charm, Better Luck Next Time headed back into the studio to record their second album, Start From Skratch, in early 2007. Once again, the album would be recorded, engineered, and produced solely by themselves in their own studio. This time around, however, the album was taken to Scottsdale, AZ, where it was mixed by Ryan Greene (formerly of Motor Studios in San Francisco, California). The title Start From Skratch, as well as the artwork, acts as a direct follow-up to Third Time's A Charm. The album was released in Japan in August 2007. Prior to its release, the band was invited to play one of Japan's largest festivals, Punkspring 2007. The festival consisted of 17 bands including NOFX, New Found Glory, and Jimmy Eat World. In October 2007, just months after the release of Start From Skratch, they headed back to Japan for another tour in support of the album with the Mad Caddies. The tour covered such areas of Japan as Tokyo, Osaka, and Nagoya.

The international success of both albums sparked attention from the American market. The band signed to World Records in early April 2008; the label released Start From Skratch on April 15, 2008. Just 2 months later in July 2008, World Records released a re-issue of Third Time's A Charm. The re-issue featured additional keyboard parts that were recorded by Joseph John and then added in. The re-issue was also re-mixed and re-mastered. Both albums featured bonus tracks as well.

=== Hybrid (2008) ===
After their return to the United States in support of Start From Skratch, the band was approached to do a split EP called Hybrid with the Italian pop punk band Melody Fall. The EP consisted of eight songs; four from Better Luck Next Time, and four from Melody Fall. Each band covered 3 songs, as well as performed an original of their own. The EP was released in Japan in May 2008 and proved to be popular amongst Japanese fans. In November 2008, World Records released Hybrid nationwide in a limited run of only 600 copies.

=== A Lifetime of Learning (2009–2011) ===
Upon the release of Hybrid in the United States, the decision was made to continue Better Luck Next Time as a four-piece again without the keyboards being present in the line-up. At the beginning of 2009, the band started writing their third album A Lifetime Of Learning. Instead of doing it entirely by themselves as they had done in the past, the band hired Steve Kravac (Blink-182, Less Than Jake, MxPx) to record, engineer, produce, and mix. The album was tracked and mixed at Gourmet Sound in Encino, California (which is owned by both Steve Kravac and guitarist Greg Hetson of Bad Religion). A summer tour with The Vandals and the Voodoo Glow Skulls was scheduled in Japan supporting the release of the album, however Brian fell ill to a rare occurrence known as Meckel's diverticulum and Better Luck Next Time was forced to cancel. A Lifetime of Learning was released in Japan in December 2009 with a rescheduled tour in January 2010.

The nationwide release of A Lifetime of Learning was delayed several times, mainly due to uncertainty with the label/distributor. In April 2010, Better Luck Next Time announced they had signed with Kid Tested Records for the distribution of the album. The US release contains several songs as they were in pre-production form, as well as demo versions of songs off the band's previous albums Third Time's A Charm and Start From Skratch. A Lifetime of Learning released in the United States on May 3, 2011.

=== We'll Take It From Here (2011–2014) ===
After the US release of A Lifetime of Learning, the band weighed over their options and approach to their fourth album. This would be the first album with lead guitarist Travis Garrecht. In late 2010, the band wrote and recorded four new songs in demo form, however they were never released. They later decided to make two of them available as a teaser for upcoming material via the internet (one of which would later be re-recorded for the new album). After the demo, the band decided that they wanted to revert to their DIY roots going forward, meaning they would record, engineer, produce, and mix on their own once again.

In 2011, Better Luck Next Time started writing their fourth album. Recording and production took place in late 2011, and rolled over into 2012. This period would prove to be a very difficult time for Brian, as he was going through a lot of personal struggles throughout the entire process of the album's production. Much of his hardships are reflected directly on the record as a result. The band was also unsure of distribution due to the delays A Lifetime Of Learning faced. It was decided that this album would be self-released, very much on the same lines of how the band did Third Time's A Charm.

On July 16, 2013, the band announced that the title would be We'll Take it From Here. The album released exactly three months later on October 16 in both Japan and the United States.

On December 20, 2014, the band announced that they made a new song called "All My Favorite Bands" off ReverbNation on the b-side of the album We'll Take It From Here. The band has been inactive since then.

== Members ==
Current

- Brian Bortoli - Vocals, Guitar (2003–present)
- Matt Fuzzo - Bass (2003–present)
- Travis Garrecht - Lead Guitar (2010–present)
- Chris Lucas - Drums (2003–present)

Former

- Leston Derrick - Vocals, Guitar (2003–2005)
- Danny Cassese - Lead Guitar (2005)
- Joseph John - Keyboards (2006–2008)
- John Holzer - Lead Guitar (2005–2010)

== Discography ==
=== Albums ===
- Third Time's a Charm (2005)
- Start from Skratch (2007)
- A Lifetime of Learning (2009)
- We'll Take it From Here (2013)

=== Splits ===
- Hybrid (2008)

=== DVDs ===
- Twisted TV DVD released April 24, 2007 on Go-Kart Films. — contains the music video for the song "T.G.I. Goodbye."

=== Compilations ===
- Pop Punk Loves You 3 — released March 27, 2007 on Wynona Records in Italy
