= Sundara Karma =

British rock band

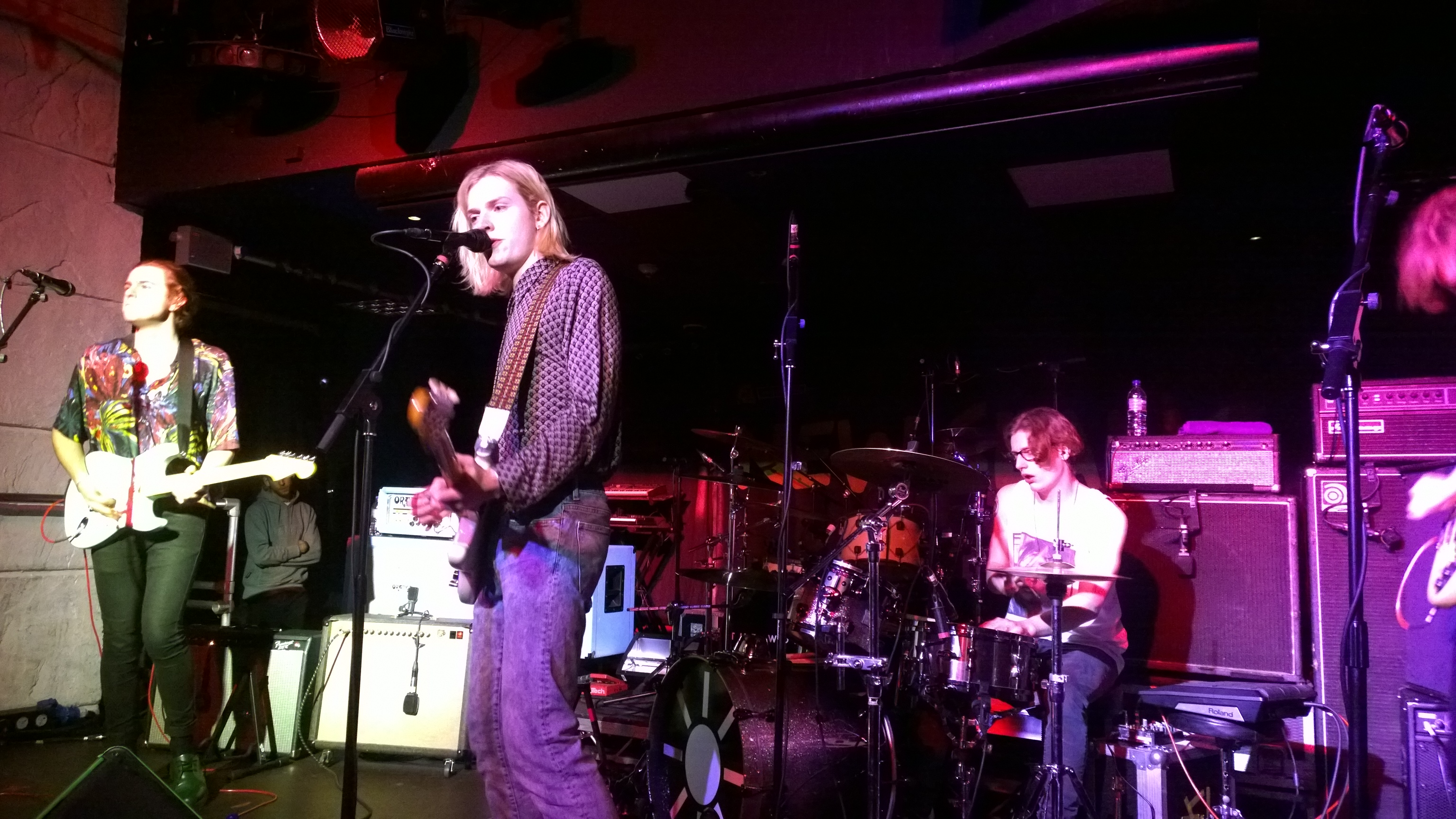
- Sundara Karma playing Hippodrome, Kingston Upon Thames in 2015

Background information
- Origin: Reading, Berkshire, England
- Genres: Indie pop, alternative rock, indie rock
- Years active: 2011–2024
- Labels: Is Right Records, Chess Club/RCA
- Past members: Oscar Pollock; Dom Cordell; Ally Baty; Haydn Evans
- Website: www.sundarakarma.com

Sundara Karma were an English rock band formed in 2011 in Reading, Berkshire. The band consisted of lead vocalist, guitarist and songwriter Oscar Pollock, lead guitarist Ally Baty, bassist Dom Cordell and drummer Haydn Evans. The band's name is derived from Hindi words, meaning "Beautiful Karma".

== History ==
=== 2011–2016: Formation and early years ===
Sundara Karma was formed in 2011 when its members were teenagers attending secondary school. In 2013, after uploading an early demo to SoundCloud, the band was offered the opportunity to be the opening support act for several prominent artists. Over the next three years, the band embarked on extensive tours across the United Kingdom and Europe, while also releasing music that would later be included on their debut album, Youth Is Only Ever Fun in Retrospect.

=== 2017–2018: Youth is Only Ever Fun In Retrospect ===
In January 2017, Sundara Karma released their debut album titled Youth Is Only Ever Fun in Retrospect via Sony Music and Chess Club. It peaked at number 24 on the UK Albums Chart and received Silver Certification from British Phonographic Industry. In May 2017, they announced an upgrade to their debut album via social media, adding the tracks "Explore", "Lakhey", and "Another Word For Beautiful" to the original track listing.

=== 2019–2020: Ulfilas' Alphabet and Kill Me ===
On 1 March 2019, Sundara Karma released their second studio album, Ulfilas' Alphabet, under RCA Records. Ulfilas' Alphabet was produced by Stuart Price and Alex Robertshaw. The album peaked at number 28 on the UK Albums Chart. Ulfilas' Alphabet received positive reviews from The Guardian, NME, Dork, DIY and others.

In May 2020, the band shared three singles titled "Today, Tomorrow, Yesterday", "Invade Safe Space" and "Vision Sick" via SoundCloud. These were unreleased songs from the recording of their 2019 album Ulfilas’ Alphabet.

On 1 October 2020, Sundara Karma released their single "Kill Me" via Chess Club Records.

On 24 October 2020, they released their EP "Kill Me" consisting of 5 songs, including the song of the same name released at the start of the month.

=== 2021–2024: Oblivion!, Better Luck Next Time, and disbandment ===
On 17 September 2021, nearly a year after their fourth EP, the band premiered the single "Godsend". In February 2022, it was followed by the release of the title track off their fifth EP, Oblivion!. The EP was released on 1 April 2022.

On 27 October 2023, the band released Better Luck Next Time, the group's first studio album in over four years. The album has been described as a "departure of sound compared to the electro-pop elements" present on Oblivion. The album received positive reviews from DIY and Dork. Better Luck Next Time peaked at number 13 on the UK Albums Chart, making it the band's first top 20 album in the UK.

On 23 September 2024, the band announced that they would "step away from making music as Sundara Karma", and the following day announced Live for the Last Time, a series of four farewell concerts. The group disbanded following their final concert on 8 December 2024 at O2 Forum Kentish Town.

== Members ==
- Oscar Pollock – vocals, rhythm and acoustic guitar, piano, keyboard, synthesizer (2011–2024)
- Dom Cordell – bass, backing vocals (2011–2024)
- Ally Baty – guitar, keyboard, synthesizers, backing vocals (2011–2024)
- Haydn Evans – drums (2011–2024)

== Discography ==
=== Studio albums ===
List of studio albums, with selected details, chart positions and certifications
Title	Details	Peak chart positions	Certifications
Title	Details	UK	Certifications
Youth Is Only Ever Fun in Retrospect	Released: 6 January 2017; Label: Sony Music/Chess Club; Format: CD, digital download, vinyl	24	BPI: Silver
Ulfilas' Alphabet	Released: 1 March 2019; Label: RCA; Format: CD, digital download, vinyl	28	
Better Luck Next Time	Released: 27 October 2023; Label: Is Right Records; Format: CDr, digital download, vinyl, cassette	-	

=== EPs ===
List of EPs, with selected details
Title	Details
EP I	Released: 23 February 2015; Format: 10", digital download
EP II	Released: 27 November 2015; Format: 10", digital download
Loveblood	Released: 4 November 2016; Format: 7", digital download
Kill Me	Released: 24 November 2020; Format: 10", digital download
Oblivion!	Released: 1 April 2022; Format: Digital download

=== Singles ===
Title	Year	Certifications	Album/EP
"Cold Heaven"	2014		Non-album singles
"Indigo Puff"	2014		Non-album singles
"Loveblood"	2015		EP I
"Flame"	2015	BPI: Silver	Youth Is Only Ever Fun in Retrospect
"Vivienne"	2015		EP II
"A Young Understanding"	2016		Youth Is Only Ever Fun in Retrospect
"She Said"	2016	BPI: Silver	Youth Is Only Ever Fun in Retrospect
"Olympia"	2016		Youth Is Only Ever Fun in Retrospect
"Happy Family"	2016		Youth Is Only Ever Fun in Retrospect
"Explore"	2017		Non-album single
"Illusions"	2018		Ulfilas’ Alphabet
"One Last Night on This Earth"	2018		Ulfilas’ Alphabet
"The Changeover"	2018		Ulfilas’ Alphabet
"Higher States"	2019		Ulfilas’ Alphabet
"Little Smart Houses"	2019		Ulfilas’ Alphabet
"Today, Tomorrow, Yesterday"	2020		Non-album singles
"Invade Safe Space"	2020		Non-album singles
"Vision Sick"	2020		Non-album singles
"Kill Me"	2020		Kill Me
"Godsend"	2021		Oblivion!
"Oblivion!"	2022		Oblivion!
"All These Dreams"	2022		Oblivion!
"Friends of Mine"	2023		Better Luck Next Time
"Baby Blue"	2023		Better Luck Next Time
"Wishing Well"	2023		Better Luck Next Time
