= John Givez =

American rapper

- Also known as: Juan Dando
- Born: John Lawrence Givens; Oceanside, California, U.S.
- Genres: Hip hop; Christian hip-hop; R&B; neo soul; soul; funk
- Occupations: Singer; songwriter; rapper; poet; producer
- Instruments: Vocals; guitar
- Years active: 2012–present
- Label: Interscope

John Lawrence Givens (born August 29), known professionally as John Givez and sometimes Juan Dando, is an American musician, who plays hip hop, R&B, soul, funk and neo soul music. He is cousins with fellow rapper JGivens. John has released two studio albums, Four Seasons in 2013, Soul Rebel in 2015, while both releases charted on the Billboard magazine charts. His most recent album Reintroducing, released in 2022, marked a notable departure from his established sound, featuring a stronger R&B influence. Soul Rebel is often considered his most complete and defining project.

== Early life ==
Givens was born, John Lawrence Givens, on August 29, 1992, in Oceanside, California, where he grew up, the son of John Sr., and Ann Givens, while his parents are originally from Columbia, South Carolina.

== Music career ==
John Givez music career started in 2013, with the studio album, Four Seasons, that was released on November 12, 2013, with Kings Dream Entertainment. The album was his breakthrough release upon the Billboard magazine charts, where it placed at No. 46 on the Gospel Albums chart. His subsequent studio album, Soul Rebel, was released on August 28, 2015, from Kings Dream Entertainment. This album charted on three Billboard magazine charts, where it placed on the Christian Albums chart at No. 7, Independent Albums chart at No. 19, and Rap Albums at No. 10.

He was also a member of the groups Cousin Neighbor (with JGivens) and Dream Junkies (with Beleaf and Ruslan). He was also featured on several songs on Asaiah Ziv's EP, Hipsavvy: The Introduction, which were Hipsavvy Cypher, Versace Dreams and Jumpman [After The Rain]. In 2016, John was featured on Lecrae's Church Clothes 3 track Misconceptions 3, in which he traded bars with Lecrae. In April 2016, John collaborated with the hardcore Christian rap group Hostyle Gospel to release a single titled Skittles & Iced Tea about the Trayvon Martin/George Zimmerman legal case.

In late 2016, Givez announced he had parted ways with his previous label, King's Dream Entertainment. In 2017, has since released the singles "2 dolla mic" and "Johnny's Cookout" as well as music videos for songs "a selfish demo" and "After hours". On April 27, 2017, John announced he would be releasing a new mixtape during the summer titled "Side A". On February 1, 2019, John released the EP titled "...To Jalisa".

== Discography ==
Albums

List of Albums, with selected chart positions
Title	Album details	Peak chart positions			
Title	Album details	US CHR	US IND	US RAP	US GOS
Four Seasons	Released: November 12, 2013; Label: Kings Dream; CD, digital download, streaming	–	–	–	46
Soul Rebel	Released: August 28, 2015; Label: Kings Dream; CD, digital download, streaming	7	19	10	
Tha Collection Tape, Vol.1	Released: March 27, 2020; Label: Tha Side; digital download, streaming	–	–	–	–

Mixtapes

List of mixtapes with selected details
Title	Details
The Little Engine That Could	Released: August 10, 2012; Label: Self-released; Formats: digital download
Mind Over Matter	Released: December 3, 2012; Label: Kings Dream; Formats: digital download
...To Jalisa	Released: February 1, 2019; Label: Tha Side; Formats: digital download, streaming
