= Desperation (Hostyle Gospel album) =

Studio album by Hostyle Gospel
- Released: August 13, 2013
- Genre: Hip hop, Christian hip hop, Crunk, Christian Rap, hardcore hip hop, gangsta rap, Gospel
- Length: 50:45
- Label: Hostyle Gospel Ministries
- Producer: King Son, Proverb

Hostyle Gospel chronology
Immortal Combat (2011)	Desperation (2013)	Hostyle Takeover (2016)

Desperation is the third album from Hostyle Gospel. Hostyle Gospel Ministries released the project on August 13, 2013. Hostyle Gospel Ministries worked with Blessing Adeoye Jr., Chivas Hemphill (Chevaltron-X), Scott Degroot, Joel Elam, Lamorax and Sene on the production of this album.

A group member said, "The idea behind this album was to show how broken this world we live in is and how we need a Savior to save us."

== Reception ==
Specifying in a seven star review by Cross Rhythms, Tony Cummings responds, "If you want your spiritual declarations shouted at you and you recognize that all of us are involved in an all-out spiritual battle there's much here on the group's third album to inspire you." Willis Fedd, writes in an 8.3 review from 1truthonline, replying, "Over all this a good album. With it only spanning 12 tracks it allows the listener to stay focused on the message. Lyrically, Hostyle Gospel gives great spiritual references and their delivery is on point. Their music production has definitely increased since their last album and it makes you excited to see what they have in store next." Bob Marovich, indicating in a three star review from The Journal of Gospel Music, recognizing "The album is peppered with fist-pumping, pep rally style chants designed to fire up a crowd to join Hostyle Gospel in taking up the fight."

Professional ratings
Review scores
Source	Rating
Cross Rhythms	7/10 stars
1truthonline	8.3 stars on a 10 point scale
Journal of Gospel Music	3/5 stars

== Track listing ==
No.	Title	Writer(s)	Producer(s)	Length
1.	"Intro" (featuring Blessing Adeoye Jr.)	Raynard Glass, Demetrius Morton, Fontaine Pizza, Blessing Adeoye	Hostyle Gospel Ministries	2:44
2.	"Praise"	Raynard Glass, Demetrius Morton, Fontaine Pizza	King Son	4:42
3.	"Hold On"	Raynard Glass, Demetrius Morton, Fontaine Pizza	Proverb	4:44
4.	"That Life" (featuring Joel Elam (J.Welz))	Raynard Glass, Demetrius Morton, Fontaine Pizza, J.Welz	Roc The Producer, Hostyle Gospel Ministries	3:51
5.	"Monsters" (Lamorax)	Raynard Glass, Demetrius Morton, Fontaine Pizza, Lamorax	Hostyle Gospel Ministries	3:39
6.	"You"	Hostyle Gospel Ministries	King Son	4:39
7.	"Break"	Raynard Glass, Demetrius Morton, Fontaine Pizza	King Son	5:04
8.	"Turn It Up"	Hostyle Gospel Ministries	King Son	3:21
9.	"Nowhere / Pop" (featuring Chevaltron-X)	Hostyle Gospel Ministries, Chevaltron-X	King Son, Proverb	6:06
10.	"Foreigners" (featuring Scott Degroot)	Hostyle Gospel Ministries, Scott Degroot	King Son	3:47
11.	"Rock"	Hostyle Gospel Ministries	Proverb	3:30
12.	"Touch the Sky" (featuring Sene')	Hostyle Gospel Ministries, Sene'	King Son	4:27
Total length:				50:45

=== Music videos ===
- "Monster" (featuring Lamorax)
- "Break"

== Personnel ==
=== Performance ===
- Hostyle Gospel - primary artists

==== Featured artists ====
- Blessing Adeoye Jr.
- Joel Elam
- Lamorax
- Chivas Hemphill (Chevaltron-X)
- Scott Degroot
- Sene

=== Production and engineering ===
- Fontaine Pizza - engineer, producer
- Raynard Glass - engineer, producer
- Demetrius Morton - producer
- King Son - producer

=== Packaging ===
- Hdavid Garcia - Photography and Graphic Design
