= Hostyle Gospel =

American poet

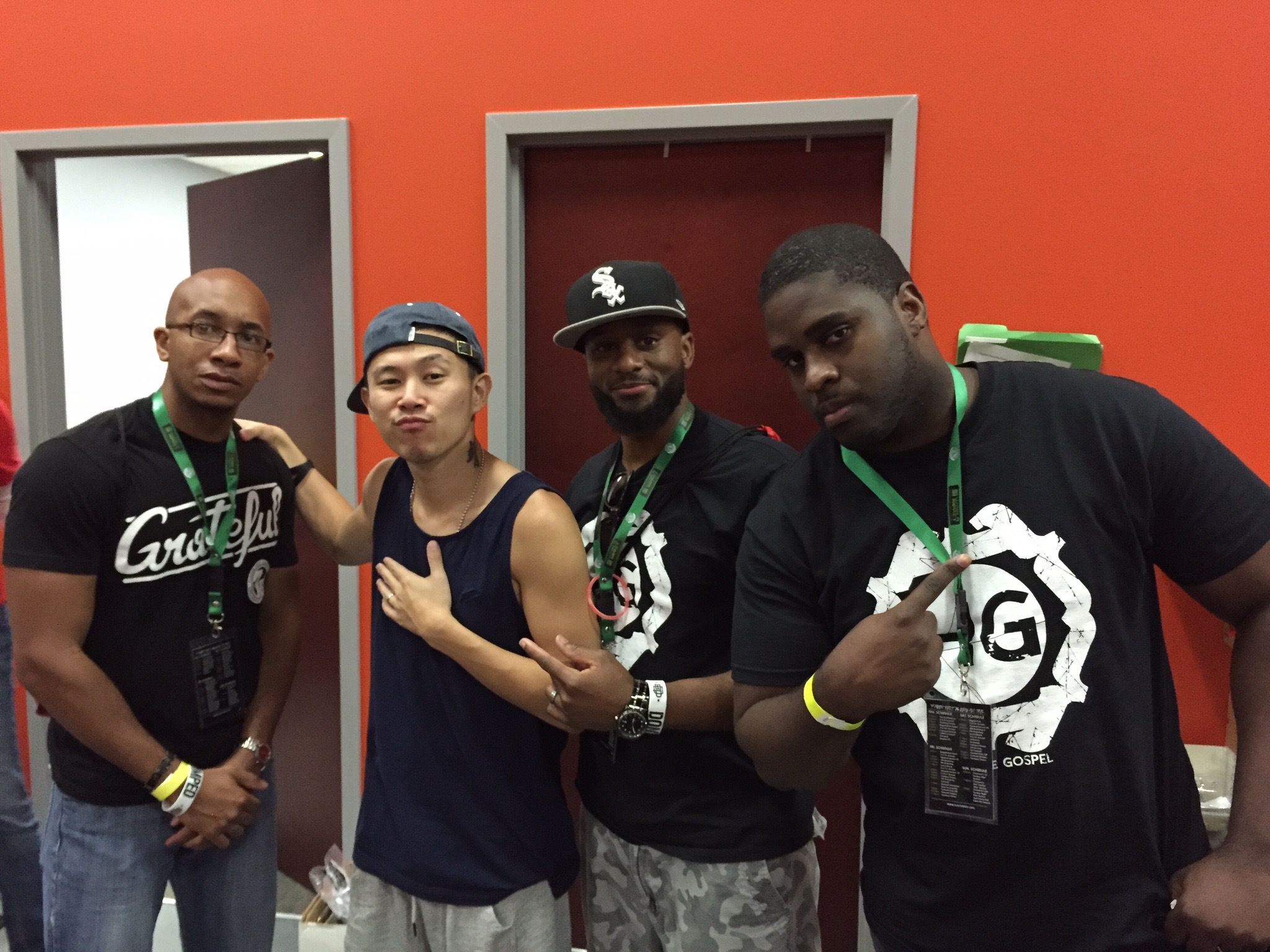
- King Soloman (left), MC Jin, Proverb and Big Job (right) at the Flavor Fest Urban Leadership Conference 2014

Background information
- Also known as: Hostile Gospel, HG, Elite M.O.C.
- Origin: Champaign, Illinois, United States
- Genres: Christian hip hop, hardcore hip hop, crunk
- Years active: 2003–present
- Label: Hostyle Gospel Ministries
- Members: King Solomon Proverb; Big Job; Teckniek; Kamikaze; Hdavid Garcia
- Website: www.hgbooking.com

Hostyle Gospel is an American Christian hip hop group from Champaign, Illinois. Its members include Demetrius Morton (King Soloman), Raynard Glass (Proverb), and Fontaine Pizza (Big Job). Hostyle Gospel is best known for their aggressive Christian rap style. The group is also known for creating their own sound called Christian battle music, which also can be referred to as Christian war music or The Hostyle Gospel sound.

== History ==
=== Formation and Early Successes (2003–2015) ===
Hostyle Gospel was formed in 2003 from a central Illinois group known as Elite M.O.C. It originally only had two members: Raynard Glass and Demetrius Morton. However, Fontaine Pizza joined the band in 2005. It also has several other members who work on music production, graphic design, and website management.

In 2013, Hostyle Gospel got together with the Champaign School of Music and hosted the Family Rock Jam Session for the Community of Champaign/Urbana. The event was the first Christian hip hop performance for an educational program in a Champaign community. After the success of the Family Rock Jam Session, the group made their on-air and debut radio broadcast on 97.9 Jamz WJWZ with their single Break. Later that year, Hostyle Gospel's album Desperation was featured in the gospel magazine Gospel Synergy in a list of new artists and new music to watch out for. On October 11, Hostyle Gospel performed with Christian rappers KB (rapper), Da' T.R.U.T.H., MC Jin at Flavor Fest Urban Leadership Conference 2014 in Tampa, Florida. In 2015. Hostyle Gospel performed on Bobby Jones Present. Bobby Jones interviewed the group and talked about his views of Christian hip hop and how he felt that the music could be a useful tool for bring people closer to Jesus Christ.

=== 2016–2018: Freedom, Liberty, Justice and Collaborations ===
On April 19, 2016 Hostyle Gospel teamed up with Christian Rapper John Givez and released a single titled Skittles & Iced Tea that talked about the Trayvon Martin/George Zimmerman case. The song addressed the importance of Freedom, Liberty, Justice and human rights for Americans. The group also teamed up with hip hop artist Gemstones and released a single entitled "Clap" which debuted on June 8, 2016. On October 14, 2016 Hostyle Gospel released their fourth studio album entitled Hostyle Takeover to great reviews. The album features Gemstones, John Givez, Fred Lynch and with beat production from Tone Jonez. According to a 2018 article by Jesus Wired, Gemstones wasn't the first choice to be on their 2016 single "Clap". The group disclosed that MC Jin was their first choice for the song. However, MC Jin had other obligations so they decided to go with Gemstones.

=== 2019–present: Triumphant Anthem ===
On August 12, 2019 the group talked to Thrive Global about the groups opinions on political topics. Hostyle Gospel opposed Christians speaking out on political topics unless political officials misrepresent the country. In that same interview, the group talked about why they chose to make an aggressive song like Skittles and Iced Tea. Big Job explained that the group hated how the young black and brown people were being mistreatment in America and felt that it was their job to try to stop some of the bleeding that the country was experiencing at that moment. In an interview with Elna Govendor on praverb.net, Big Job explained Hostyle Gospel's lack of excitement about award shows. He convey that "award shows are for people, not God. At award shows, people are expected to judge individuals on their art, which they put their blood, sweat and tears into — all to get praise from others, whose opinions shouldn’t matter anyway."

Hostyle Gospel has released four studio albums, four mixtapes and has worked with many of the top names in the Christian industry. The group is also being guided and mentored by Christian rap legend Fred Lynch from the Christian hip hop group P.I.D.

The group released a single entitled I Am Not The One on January 3, 2020. The song was rated a 5 star by Jono Davies from Louder Than The Music and was praised for its "pulse-pounding rhythms, raw lyrics and for igniting a fire of passion for God all across America."

In late 2020, Hostyle Gospel collaborated with Reach Records rapper 1K Phew and indie rapper Joe Glass III to release a single called June 98. The track was a reference to 1998 Chicago Bull's Championship team and Inspiration by Michael Jordan's quote from the ESPN The Last Dance (miniseries) film “They can’t win unless we quit!”, which was a celebration of the Bulls’ second defeat of the Utah Jazz.

== Reception ==
In 2013, the group's album Desperation received a review of 3/5 from gospel music historian, Bob Marovitch, of the Journal of Gospel Music. Marovitch described the group as "a no-nonsense battle axe who loves the world and its people enough to help them mightily". On October 23, 2014, Brain Magazine (fr) released an article praising the group for being one of the benchmarks for how true Christian rappers should record music and conduct themselves in the music industry. In 2014 at the Flavor Fest 2014 Conference, Hostyle Gospel was interviewed live on the #1 syndicated Christian hip hop radio show, Jam The Hype with Chris Chicago. Their single Break was debuted and the group also talked about their future plans and projects. In 2015 their Desperation album brought the group international success. Cross Rhythms picked Hostyle Gospel's "Praise", "Turn It Up" and "Rock" to be featured on 101.8FM Cross Rhythms City Radio station in the UK.

== Members ==
- Proverb – vocalist
- King Soloman – vocalist
- Big Job – vocalist
- Teckniek – Back Up Rapper
- Hdavid Garcia – Drummer
- Kamikaze – Dancer
- King Son – Main Producer

== Discography ==
=== Studio albums ===
- Let Me At Em (2007)
- Immortal Combat (2011)
- Desperation (2013)
- Hostyle Takeover (2016)

== Filmography ==
=== Television ===
Title	Year	Role	Network
Bobby Jones Gospel	2015	themselves	The Impact Network
