= Demarco Castle =

American rapper

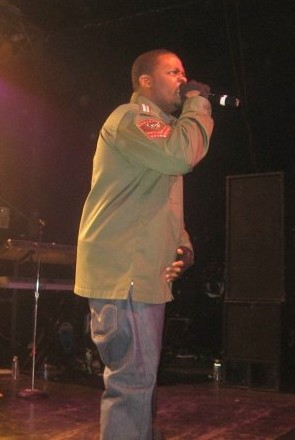
- Castle performing in 2008
- Born: Demarco Lamonte Castle; June 20, 1981 (age 45)
- Other names: Gemstones; Gemini
- Spouse: Annie E. Castle (m. 2009)
- Musical career
- Origin: Chicago, Illinois, U.S.
- Genres: Hip hop; Christian hip hop
- Occupations: Singer; rapper; songwriter
- Years active: 2001–present
- Labels: Malaco; Xist; Bahari; 1st and 15th

Demarco Lamonte Castle (born June 20, 1981), also known as Gemstones, is an American singer and rapper from Chicago. He is most well known for his affiliation with fellow Chicago artist Lupe Fiasco.

Formerly under the stage name Gemini, Castle began his hip hop career through Lupe Fiasco's Atlantic Records imprint, 1st and 15th Entertainment, where he was set to release his debut album, Troubles of the World, in early 2009. The album has since been delayed indefinitely due to his departure from mainstream hip hop and the discontinuation of 1st and 15th Entertainment. After a brief hiatus, Castle returned to the underground hip hop scene and has since signed to Xist Music as he pursues a career in Christian hip hop. Under his new label, Castle released his debut album, Blind Elephant, in 2015.

== Early life ==
Castle was raised in Jeffrey Manor/ South C on Chicago's South Side. Castle derives from a family where music was a heavy influence, sounds of R&B, jazz and even funk all influenced Castle's musical development. As a student in Bowen High School's visual and performing and arts program, Castle excelled and learned to develop his outstanding musical talents.

After graduation from Bowen, Castle met the then-unknown rappers Lupe Fiasco and Stack Bundles. Fiasco who had his own record company, 1st and 15th Entertainment, was tremendously impressed by Castle's rapping and singing abilities and in 2001 he decided to sign Castle to his label.

== Career ==
=== 2001–2007: Gemini at 1st and 15th Entertainment ===
In 2001, Castle was signed to Lupe Fiasco's label imprint, 1st and 15th Entertainment, performing under the stage name of Gemini. Castle's first mainstream hip hop exposure came in September 2006 with the release of Lupe Fiasco's highly anticipated debut album Lupe Fiasco's Food & Liquor. Out of the sixteen tracks on the album Castle was featured on five of them, including standout tracks "He Say She Say" and "Pressure" also featuring Jay-Z. Later in 2006, Castle was given the opportunity of headlining the soundtrack for the MTV special "My Block: Chicago", where he released a video for his debut single "Got What You Need".

With the attention gained from Lupe Fiasco's Food & Liquor and his appearance on "MTV's My Block", Castle released the fifth part of the popular Fahrenheit 1st and 15th mixtape series, which had mainly been headlined by Lupe Fiasco. The mixtape, titled Untamed Beast, featured Lupe Fiasco only once and primarily focused on Castle as he demonstrated his singing and rapping abilities. The mixtape was moderately successful in furthering Castle's exposure to hip hop listeners across the United States.

In 2007, Castle released the single "We On", featuring Lupe Fiasco and Pooh Bear, as the first single from his debut album Troubles of the World. The single was largely successful, generating considerable interest for Castle worldwide. Following the release of "We On", Castle was featured a number of times, both rapping and singing, on Lupe Fiasco's second full-length album Lupe Fiasco's The Cool. Castle was featured on "Dumb it Down", the first single from the project. In support of the album Fiasco embarked on a nationwide tour, where Castle served as one of the featured artist on the sold out venture. During this time Castle was featured in prominent hip hop magazines such as The Source and XXL.

=== 2007–2008: Name Change to GemStones ===
In 2007, Castle was forced to change his stage name from Gemini to GemStones due to legal technicalities. The name change was seen a significant transition period for Castle as he lost weight, cut off his trademark braids and changed the content of his music away from gangsta rap, focusing more on personal struggles. Castle admitted that his lifestyle didn't match that which he portrayed in his lyrics in regards to gang violence, drug dealing and treatment of women. Castle expressed concerns that his music would not have been accepted if it hadn't have reflected popular lyrical content of crime and materialism.

In 2008, in advance of his debut album, Troubles of the World, Castle released the sixth part of the Fahrenheit 1st and 15th mixtape series, The Testimony of GemStones. The mixtape was remarkably successful and demonstrated Castle as a changed artist from his past music as Gemini.

With the release of his second highly successful mixtape, Castle was highlighted as a "Hip Hop Act to Watch" as his debut album, Troubles of the World, was set to release with much anticipation early in 2009.

=== 2009–2013: Leaving 1st and 15th Entertainment ===
After the death of his best friend, Reginald "St. Nic" Coleman, Castle delayed the release of Troubles of the World and stepped away from music. During his time away from music Castle married and began focusing his life on Christianity, later announcing that he planned to drop the name Gemstones and leave hip hop in favor of pursuing gospel music.

As Castle began to spread rumors of his return to hip hop, he expressed his desire to leave 1st and 15th Entertainment shortly before Lupe Fiasco discontinued the label in November 2009. Castle made his return to hip hop with the release of two independently released mixtapes under the name Gemstones (no longer stylized as GemStones). The first, On the Road to Glory: My Story, was released August 22, 2010, and the second, Elephant in the Room, was released November 2, 2012.

=== 2013–present: Xist Music ===
In 2013, Castle signed to Christian record label Xist Music where he later released his debut album, Blind Elephant, on May 5, 2015, after it had been delayed numerous times. The album was met with mixed reviews as it had garnered a moderate amount of interest yet left some fans disappointed by the long delays and heavily religious lyrical content.

While under Xist Music, Castle has collaborated with a number of Christian hip hop artists including rap group Hostyle Gospel where he was featured on the track "Clap", which debuted on June 8, 2016.

== Discography ==
Studio Albums

- 2009: Troubles of the World (unreleased)
- 2015: Blind Elephant

Mixtapes

- 2006: Fahrenheit 1st and 15th Vol. V: Untamed Beast
- 2008: Fahrenheit 1st and 15th Vol. VI: The Testimony of GemStones
- 2010: On the Road to Glory My Story
- 2012: Elephant in the Room

=== Guest appearances ===
- 2009: "We Miss You" (with Busta Rhymes, & JellyRoll) on Back on My B.S.
