= Chapter 6 (band) =

American all-male a cappella ensemble

Chapter 6 is an American professional, all-male, a cappella, vocal ensemble which predominantly tours the United States. Composed of six vocalists and one arranger, Chapter 6 is the only vocal ensemble to win both the International Championship of Collegiate A Cappella (2001) and The National Harmony Sweepstakes (2004). Chapter 6 was featured on American Idol Season 7 in conjunction with bandmate Luke Menard's “Top 16” run.

Having received numerous A cappella Community Awards, including “Favorite Jazz Group,” Chapter 6 emerged from the collegiate entertainment industry, where The Association for the Promotion of Collegiate Activities’ audiences named the band "Entertainer of the Year" (2005), at the same time the band broke the all-time booking record for the National Association of Campus Activities. Prior to landing an agent, Chapter 6 made its start as the premiere a cappella ensemble at Millikin University in Decatur, Illinois before winning its first competition in 2000.

Since 2004, Chapter 6 has performed in theatrical pops programs with a variety of major metropolitan symphony orchestras in association with the Symphonic Pops Consortium and Maestro Jack Everly.

Their self-produced albums include two collegiate recordings and three professional recordings: “A cappella 101” (1999), “Chapter 6: Live” (2001), “ChristmasTime” (2002), “Swing Shift” (2004) and “With the Windows Down” (2008). Their "Wizard of Oz Medley” earned them a Contemporary A Cappella Recording Award (2005).

In 2008, the band made its Asian debut in Hong Kong.

Chapter 6, based in Illinois, is: Chuck Bosworth, Mark Grizzard, Jarrett Johnson, Luke Menard, John Musick, Nathan Pufall, and A.D. Stonecipher. Luke Menard was in the top 24 for American Idol Season 7, and made it to the top 16 before being eliminated.
