= Bree Runway discography =

Discography

- EPs: 4
- Singles: 16
- Music videos: 15
- Mixtapes: 1

British rapper and singer-songwriter Bree Runway has released four extended plays (EPs) and 16 singles (including two as a featured artist). She released her debut mixtape titled 2000and4Eva, via EMI Records in November 2020. After splitting from the label in 2023, she's released music independently since 2024.

== Mixtapes ==
List of mixtapes, with selected details
Title	Mixtape details
2000and4Eva	Released: 6 November 2020; Label: EMI; Format: Digital download, streaming

== Extended plays ==
List of extended plays, with selected details
Title	Extended play details
RNWY 01	Released: 25 November 2015; Label: Self released; Format: Digital download
Bouji	Released: 9 May 2016; Label: Self released; Format: Digital download
Be Runway	Released: 16 August 2019; Label: Virgin EMI; Format: Digital download, streaming
Woah, What a Blur!	Released: 8 December 2022; Label: Virgin EMI; Format: Digital download, streaming
+233 Worldwide!	Released: 17 April 2025; Label: Free Runway; Format: Digital download

== Singles ==
=== As lead artist ===
List of singles as lead artist, with selected details
Title	Year	Peak chart positions	Album
Title	Year	NZ Hot	Album
"Butterfly"	2016	—	Non-album singles
"What Do I Tell My Friends?"	2017	—	Non-album singles
"2ON"	2019	—	Be Runway
"Big Racks" (featuring Brooke Candy)	2019	—	Be Runway
"All Night"	2019	—	Be Runway
"Apeshit"	2020	—	2000and4Eva
"Damn Daniel" (with Yung Baby Tate)	2020	—	2000and4Eva
"Gucci" (with Maliibu Miitch)	2020	—	2000and4Eva
"Little Nokia"	2020	—	2000and4Eva
"ATM" (Note: "ATM" featuring Missy Elliott is included on 2000and4Eva whilst the solo "Breemix" version was released as a standalone single.) (solo or featuring Missy Elliott)	2020	—	2000and4Eva
"Hot Hot"	2021	—	Non-album singles
"Space Ghost Coast to Coast" (with Glass Animals)	2021	—	Non-album singles
"Pressure"	2022	—	Non-album singles
"Somebody Like You"	2022	—	Non-album singles
"That Girl"	2022	—	Woah, What a Blur!
"Be the One" (with Khalid)	2023	32	Non-album singles
"Just Like That"	2024	—	Non-album singles
"Pawz"	2024	—	Non-album singles
"2BadGyalz"	2024	—	Non-album singles
"Hot Like!"	2025	—	Non-album singles
"Bags of Yen"	2026	—	Non-album singles

=== As featured artist ===
Title	Year	Album
"Word of Mouth" (Metroplane featuring Bree Runway)	2018	non-album singles
"XS" (Remix) (Rina Sawayama featuring Bree Runway)	2020	Sawayama (Note: "XS (Remix)" is included on the deluxe edition of Sawayama as well as the Sawayama Remixed EP.)
"Slight Werk" (Honey Dijon featuring Bree Runway)	2026	The Nightlife

== Guest appearances ==
List of non-single guest appearances, with other performing artists, showing year released and album name
Title	Year	Other artist(s)	Album
"Swing"	2019	Brooke Candy	Sexorcism
"The Vibe"	2021	Amorphous	Things Take Shape
"Babylon" (Bree Runway and Jimmy Edgar Remix)	2021	Lady Gaga	Dawn of Chromatica
"Fancy" (Remix)	2022	Amaarae	The Angel You Don't Know (Vinyl Edition)
"Nocturnal" (Unlocked)	2024	Flo	Access All Areas: Unlocked
"Starkilla"	2025	Amaarae, Starkillers	Black Star

== Music videos ==
List of music videos, showing year released and directors
Title	Year	Director(s)	Ref.
"Butterfly"	2016	Bree Runway	
"What Do I Tell My Friends?"	2017	Fred Rowson	
"2ON"	2019	Fred Rowson	
"Big Racks" (featuring Brooke Candy)	2019	Fred Rowson	
"All Night"	2019	Tash Tung	
"Apeshit"	2020	Will Hooper	
"Damn Daniel" (with Yung Baby Tate)	2020	Gemma Yin	
"Gucci" (with Maliibu Miitch)	2020	Tash Tung	
"Gucci" (Dance Video)	2020	Unknown	
"Little Nokia"	2020	Ali Kurr	
"ATM" (featuring Missy Elliott)	2021	Lucrecia Taormina	
"Hot Hot"	2021	Jocelyn Anquetil	
"Pressure"	2022	Nadira Amrani	
"Somebody Like You"	2022	Claire Arnold	
"Somebody Like You" (Orchestral Version)	2022	Unknown	
"That Girl"	2022	Ruth Hogben	
"Be The One" (with Khalid)	2023	Zachary Bailey	
"Just Like That"	2024	Pietro Biz Biasia	

=== Guest appearances ===
List of music videos with cameo appearances, showing year released and artists
Year	Title	Artist(s)	Ref.
2021	"Have Mercy"	Chlöe	
