= Baby Tate discography =

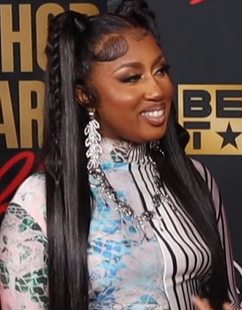
- Baby Tate in 2022
- Studio albums: 1
- EPs: 9
- Singles: 18
- Music videos: 9
- Mixtapes: 2

American rapper Baby Tate, formerly known as Yung Baby Tate, has released one studio album, nine extended plays (EPs), two mixtape and 25 singles (including eight as a featured artist), four promotional singles, and nine solo music videos.

== Albums ==
=== Studio albums ===
List of studio albums with details
Title	Details
Girls	Released: February 5, 2019; Label: Self-released; Format: Digital download, streaming

== Mixtapes ==
List of mixtapes with details
Title	Details
Mani/Pedi	Released: September 30, 2022; Label: Warner Records; Format: Digital download, streaming
Tate Tuesday, Vol. 1	Released: October 29, 2024; Label: Warner Records; Format: Digital download, streaming

== Extended plays ==
List of extended plays with details
Title	Details
ROYGBIV	Released: November 10, 2015; Label: Self-released; Format: Digital download
Xmas	Released: December 6, 2016; Label: Self-released; Format: Digital download
Cuddy Buddy	Released: February 12, 2018; Label: Self-released; Format: Digital download, streaming
Boys	Released: May 8, 2018; Label: Self-released; Format: Digital download, streaming
Summer Lover	Released: July 17, 2018; Label: Self-released; Format: Digital download, streaming
After the Rain	Released: December 4, 2020; Label: Self-released; Format: Digital download, streaming
Hey, Mickey! (Full Pack)	Released: February 24, 2023; Label: Streamcut; Format: Digital download, streaming
Slut Him Out (Bundle)	Released: March 17, 2023; Label: Warner Records; Format: Digital download, streaming
Sexploration: The Muscial	Released: October 27, 2023; Label: Warner Records; Format: Digital download, streaming

== Singles ==
=== As lead artist ===
Title	Year	Peak chart positions							Certification	Album
Title	Year	US Bub.	US R&B/HH	US Rap	CAN	IRE	NZ Hot	WW	Certification	Album
"B.B.L.U."	2016	—	—	—	—	—	—	—		Non-album single
"Hey, Mickey!"	2016	5	40	—	70	69	—	134	RIAA: Gold	Hey, Mickey! (Full Pack)
"Bob"	2017	—	—	—	—	—	—	—		Boys
"Been in My Bag"	2017	—	—	—	—	—	—	—		Non-album single
"Pretty Girl" (solo or featuring Killumantii and Mulatto)	2018	—	—	—	—	—	—	—		Girls
"Back Up"	2018	—	—	—	—	—	—	—		Non-album singles
"Too Long"	2018	—	—	—	—	—	—	—		Non-album singles
"That Girl"	2018	—	—	—	—	—	—	—		Non-album singles
"Hallelujah"	2019	—	—	—	—	—	—	—		Non-album singles
"Camp"	2019	—	—	—	—	—	—	—		Non-album singles
"Don't Want It"	2020	—	—	—	—	—	—	—		Non-album singles
"He Wanna" (featuring B.K. Habermehl)	2020	—	—	—	—	—	—	—		Non-album singles
"Damn Daniel" (with Bree Runway)	2020	—	—	—	—	—	—	—		2000and4Eva
"B.O.M.B.S"	2020	—	—	—	—	—	—	—		Non-album singles
"Hey Ladies"	2020	—	—	—	—	—	—	—		Non-album singles
"Rainbow Cadillac"	2020	—	—	—	—	—	—	—		After the Rain
"I Am" (featuring Flo Milli)	2021	—	— (Note: "I Am" did not enter the Hot R&B/Hip-Hop Songs chart, but peaked at number 15 on the R&B/Hip-Hop Digital Song Sales chart.)	— (Note: "I Am" did not enter the Hot Rap Songs chart, but peaked at number 9 on the Rap Digital Song Sales chart.)	—	—	29	—	RIAA: Gold	After the Rain
"Kim" (with Tkay Maidza)	2021	—	—	—	—	—	—	—		Last Year Was Weird, Vol. 3
"Dirty Girl" (with Siena Liggins)	2021	—	—	—	—	—	—	—		Ms. Out Tonight
"Eenie Meenie"	2021	—	—	—	—	—	—	—		After the Rain (Deluxe)
"Ooo That's My Type" (with Marian Hill)	2021	—	—	—	—	—	—	—		Why Can't We Just Pretend?
"Poof Be Gone" (with KyleYouMadeThat and Yvette featuring Cheerlebridee)	2021	—	—	—	—	—	—	—		Non-album single
"Pedi"	2021	—	—	—	—	—	—	—		Mani/Pedi
"What's Love"	2022	—	—	—	—	—	—	—		Mani/Pedi
"Slut Him Out" (solo or featuring Kali)	2022	—	—	—	—	—	—	—		Mani/Pedi
"Dancing Queen"	2022	—	—	—	—	—	—	—		Mani/Pedi
"Yasss Queen"	2022	—	—	—	—	—	—	—		Mani/Pedi
"Ain't No Love" (featuring 2 Chainz)	2022	—	—	—	—	—	—	—		Mani/Pedi
"Hey Mickey!" (solo or with Saweetie)	2023	—	—	—	—	—	—	—		Non-album single
"Jersey"	2023	—	—	—	—	—	—	—		Sexploration: The Musical
"Grip"	2024	—	—	—	—	—	—	—		Sexploration: The Musical
"Butter" (with Prof and Ghosttown)	2024	—	—	—	—	—	—	—		Non-album singles
"Fine" (with Izye)	2025	—	—	—	—	—	—	—		Non-album singles
"—" denotes a recording that did not chart or was not released in that territory.

=== As featured artist ===
List of singles as featured artist, showing year released, peak chart positions, certifications, and album title
Title	Year	Peak chart positions				Certification	Album
Title	Year	US	CAN	IRE	NZ Hot	Certification	Album
"Rainfall" (Flwr Chyld featuring Baby Tate)	2016	—	—	—	—		Non-album singles
"Tang 'Em Up" (Miracle Whip featuring Yung Baby Tate)	2018	—	—	—	—		Non-album singles
"Georgia Peach" (S'bortè featuring Baby Tate)	2018	—	—	—	—		Non-album singles
"Stupid" (Ashnikko featuring Baby Tate)	2019	— (Note: "Stupid" did not enter the US Billboard Hot 100, but peaked at number one on the Bubbling Under Hot 100 chart.)	63	93	29	RIAA: Gold; MC: Gold; RMNZ: Gold	Hi, It's Me
"Don't Waste My Time" (Handsome Habibi featuring Baby Tate)	2020	—	—	—	—		Non-album singles
"So Messed Up (Remix)" (La Lana featuring Baby Tate)	2020	—	—	—	—		Non-album singles
"Love Thing" (Malia Civetz featuring Baby Tate)	2020	—	—	—	—		The Flip
"Feel It" (Georgia featuring Baby Tate)	2020	—	—	—	—		Non-album single
"Surround Sound" (JID featuring 21 Savage and Baby Tate)	2022	40	27	—	6	RIAA: 2× Platinum; RMNZ: 2× Platinum	The Forever Story
"Want Not a Need" (Kidd Kenn featuring Baby Tate)	2022	—	—	—	—		Grown
"Come First" (Vedo and OG Parker featuring Baby Tate)	2022	—	—	—	—		Non-album singles
"Sailor Moon 2.0" (LAYA featuring Baby Tate)	2022	—	—	—	—		Non-album singles
"ATM" (Nono featuring Baby Tate)	2023	—	—	—	—		Non-album singles
"Bow" (MFS featuring Baby Tate)	2023	—	—	—	—		Non-album singles
"Picky" (Leaf featuring Baby Tate)	2024	—	—	—	—		Dreamgirl
"Awesome" (Sophie Powers featuring Baby Tate)	2024	—	—	—	—		Glitch: Lvl 1
"—" denotes a recording that did not chart or was not released in that territory.

=== Promotional singles ===
List of promotional singles, showing year released, peak chart positions, and album title
Title	Year	Album
"Wild Girl" (featuring BbyMutha)	2019	Girls
"Never Lonely" (featuring Jozzy)	2020	Insecure
"Do Me Like That" (featuring Buddy)	2020	Insecure

== Guest appearances ==
List of non-single guest appearances, showing year released, other artist(s) featured, and album name
Title	Year	Other artist(s)	Album
"Cardi"	2017	Omarthegroove	Before It Gets Better
"Drop It Off"	2018	iSwear Cartier	The Cartier Tape, Vol. 1
"All This"	2018	Preme Fein	N.W.O.
"Thots in the Lot"	2018	GodIsMikey	Are You a Believer?
"Too Young"	2018	The Backpack Kid	SwagPack Kid
"Highlight"	2019	Space Campp	Written in the Stars
"Don't Hit Me Right Now"	2019	Dreamville, Bas, Cozz, Guapdad 4000, Buddy	Revenge of the Dreamers III
"Like We"	2020	Krewella, Alaya	Zer0
"Flick! (Stacey)"	2020	Jean Deaux	Watch This!
"Dirty Girl"	2021	Siena Liggins	Ms. Out Tonight
"Might As Well Have Coal"	2022	LVRN	Home For the Holidays, Vol.2

== Music videos ==
List of music videos, with directors, showing year released
Title	Year	Director(s)
"Orange"	2016	N/A
"What I Want"	2018	ATLVenture Films
"Back Up"	2018	Brix
"Pretty Girl"	2018	ATLVenture Films
"Beckham"	2018	Something to Say Productions
"Bad Girl"	2019	Unkle Luc
"Pretty Girl (Remix)" (featuring Killumantii and Mulatto)	2019	Des Gray
"Wild Girl" (featuring BbyMutha)	2019	Ben Hype
"Mean Girl" (featuring Queen Key and Asian Doll)	2019	Nfluence and Creedlife
"Rainbow Cadillac"	2020	Jacob Hale
"Cold"	2020	Aries Purnell
