= Paperwhite =

Paperwhite may refer to:

- Paperwhite (band), an American synthpop group
- Kindle Paperwhite, an e-book reader
- Narcissus papyraceus or Paperwhite, a perennial bulbous plant
- Narcissus tazetta or Paperwhite, a perennial ornamental plant
