= 100% (EP) =

EP by Monogem
- Released: May 19, 2017
- Length: 23:34
- Language: English
- Label: Monogem (self-released)
- Producer: Peter Joel Dyer; Scott Michael Smith

Monogem chronology
Monogem (2015)	100% (2017)	So Many Ways (2019)

Singles from 100%
- 1. "Gone" Released: October 9, 2015; 2. "Take It Slow" Released: April 22, 2016; 3. "Wild" Released: January 20, 2017; 4. "100%" Released: April 25, 2017

100% is the second extended play by Mexican-American singer and songwriter Monogem, which was released on May 19, 2017. The EP was supported by four singles: "Gone", "Take It Slow", "Wild", and "100%".

== Release and promotion ==
=== Singles ===
At the end of 2015, Monogem released a single titled "Gone". On April 22, 2016, she released another single, "Take It Slow", which features a "slinking beat, ethereal synths, and the singer's smokey alto".

A year later on January 20, 2016, the single "Wild" was released. The single also included a music video featuring Matthew RC Taylor and Coco Arquette, the daughter of Courteney Cox. The music video includes "a dreamy and colorful story about... two young teenagers getting wild in their own unique way". The video was released on March 29, 2017.

"100%" was released as the last single from the EP.

=== Remix ===
Monogem released a remixed version of her second extended play that features producers Zach Nicita, Paperwhite, Jamie Prado and ELIS.

== Track listing ==
100% track listing
No.	Title	Writer(s)	Length
1.	"Realize"		1:51
2.	"100%"	Neara Aurora Russell; Jennifer Hirsh	3:45
3.	"Wild"	Harlan Alexander Silverman; Jennifer Hirsh; Peter Joel Dyer	3:36
4.	"Take It Slow"	Jennifer Hirsh; Peter Joel Dyer; Nate Lotz	3:29
5.	"Talk"		4:15
6.	"I Am"		3:07
7.	"Gone"	Jennifer Hirsh; Peter Joel Dyer; Scott Michael Smith	3:37
Total length:			23:34

100% (The Remixes) track listing
No.	Title	Length
1.	"I Am" (Zach Nicita Remix)	3:22
2.	"Gone" (Paperwhite Remix)	3:31
3.	"Wild" (Jamie Prado Remix)	3:28
4.	"I Am" (Elis Remix)	3:06
Total length:		13:45

== Release history ==
Release dates and formats for 100%
Region	Date	Format(s)	Version	Label	Ref.
Various	May 19, 2017	streaming; digital download	Original	Monogem	
Various	September 24, 2017	streaming; digital download	Remix	Monogem	
