= Monogem (EP) =

EP by Monogem
- Released: February 3, 2015
- Genre: R&B; synthpop; electronic; soul
- Length: 18:37
- Language: English
- Label: Monogem (self-released)

Monogem chronology
Monogem (2015)	100% (2017)

Singles from Monogem
- 1. "Follow You" Released: June 2, 2013; 2. "Wait and See" Released: March 31, 2014; 3. "Stay With Me" Released: September 20, 2014; 4. "The Glow" Released: January 20, 2015

Monogem is the debut self-titled extended play by Mexican-American singer and songwriter Monogem, which was released worldwide on February 3, 2015. The album was supported by four singles: Follow You, Wait and See, Stay With Me, and The Glow.

== Background ==
After leaving in Top 15 in season eleven of American Idol, Jennifer Hirsh re-evaluated her music and sound. She draws inspiration from electronic dance music such as Grimes and James Blake. She later contacted her high school friend and producer, Scott Michael Smith. Together, Smith mixed Hirsh's soul-filled vocals, modern rhythms, giving rise to Hirsh's alter ego, Monogem.

== Release and promotion ==
Monogem announced a limited edition bone white vinyl for her debut extended play through Turntable Kitchen, a subscription service. The second single, "Wait and See", was placed on Top 13 for BuzzFeed’s Perfect Pop Songs from 2015.

=== Singles ===
On June 2, 2013, Monogem release her debut single called "Follow You" through SoundCloud, then later on through other platforms. A year later, Monogem released two singles: "Wait and See" on March 31, 2014; and "Stay With Me" on September 20, 2014.

== Track listing ==
Monogem track listing
No.	Title	Writer(s)	Length
1.	"Wait and See"	Jennifer Hirsh; Samuel Langford Hindes	3:35
2.	"Follow You"		3:46
3.	"Stay With Me"		3:35
4.	"Silhouette"		3:04
5.	"The Glow"		4:37
Total length:			18:37

== Release history ==
Release dates and formats for 100%
Region	Date	Format(s)	Version	Label	Ref.
Various	February 3, 2015	streaming; digital download	Standard	MONOGEM	
Various	May 6, 2015	vinyl	Standard	Turntable Kitchen	
