= Garzena =

Garzena is an Italian surname. Notable people with the surname include:

- Bruno Garzena (born 1933), Italian footballer
- Edoardo Garzena (1900–1984), Italian boxer
- Víctor García Garzena (1913–1986), Chilean lawyer

== See also ==
- Gardena (disambiguation)
