= Gardenia (disambiguation) =

Gardenia is a genus of about 250 species of flowering plants

Gardenia may also refer to:

== Arts, entertainment, and media ==
=== Fictional entities ===
- Gardenia, a character in Pokémon Diamond and Pearl
- Gardenia, a fictional city from the popular TV show Winx Club

=== Music ===
- "Gardenia" (Iggy Pop song), 2016
- "Gardenia" (Kyuss song), 1995
- Gardenia (album), 2021 by Monogem
- "Gardenia" (Malice Mizer song), 2001
- "Gardenia", a song by Mandy Moore, from the album Wild Hope
- "Gardenia", a song by Stephen Malkmus and the Jicks, from the album Real Emotional Trash

=== Other arts, entertainment, and media ===
- Gardenia (film), a 1979 film starring Martin Balsam
- Gardenia, a play by John Guare
- Gardenia, an international stage performance tour profiled in the 2014 documentary film Before the Last Curtain Falls

== Other uses ==
- Gardenia, Belize, a village in the Belize District
- Gardenia Foods, a Singaporean baked-goods company
- MV Gardenia - a number of motor vessels named Gardenia
- Vincent Gardenia (1920–1992), Italian-American actor of stage, film, and television

== See also ==
- Gardena (disambiguation)
- Gardenian, a Swedish band
