= Gaudentia =

Gaudentia is a feminine given name.

== People with the given name ==
- Gaudentia Kabaka (born 1949), Tanzanian politician
- Gaudentia Krohne (born 1972), Namibian politician

== See also ==
- Gardena (disambiguation)
