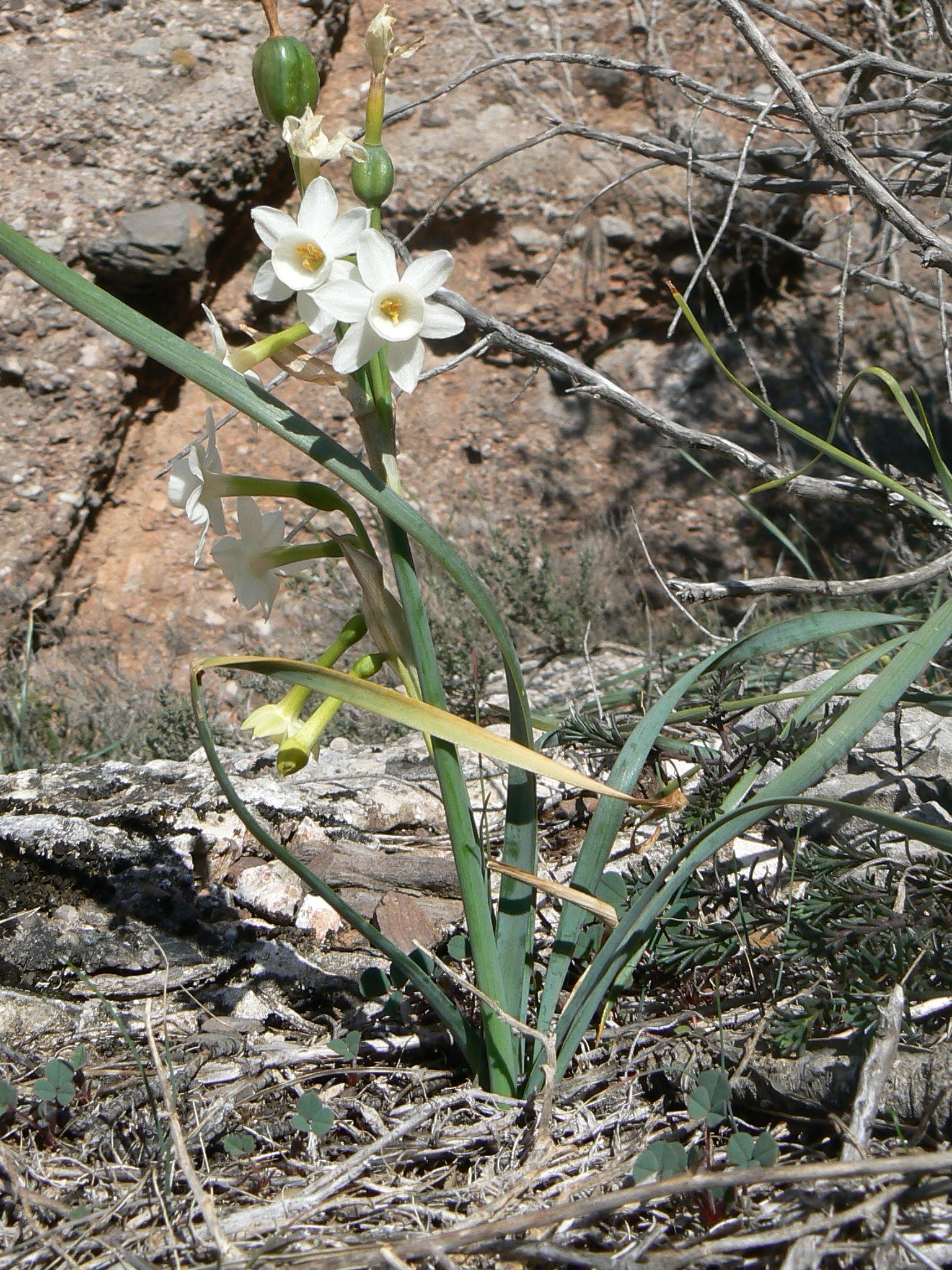

Scientific classification
- Kingdom: Plantae
- Clade: Tracheophytes
- Clade: Angiosperms
- Clade: Monocots
- Order: Asparagales
- Family: Amaryllidaceae
- Subfamily: Amaryllidoideae
- Genus: Narcissus
- Species: N. dubius

Binomial name
- Narcissus dubius Gouan
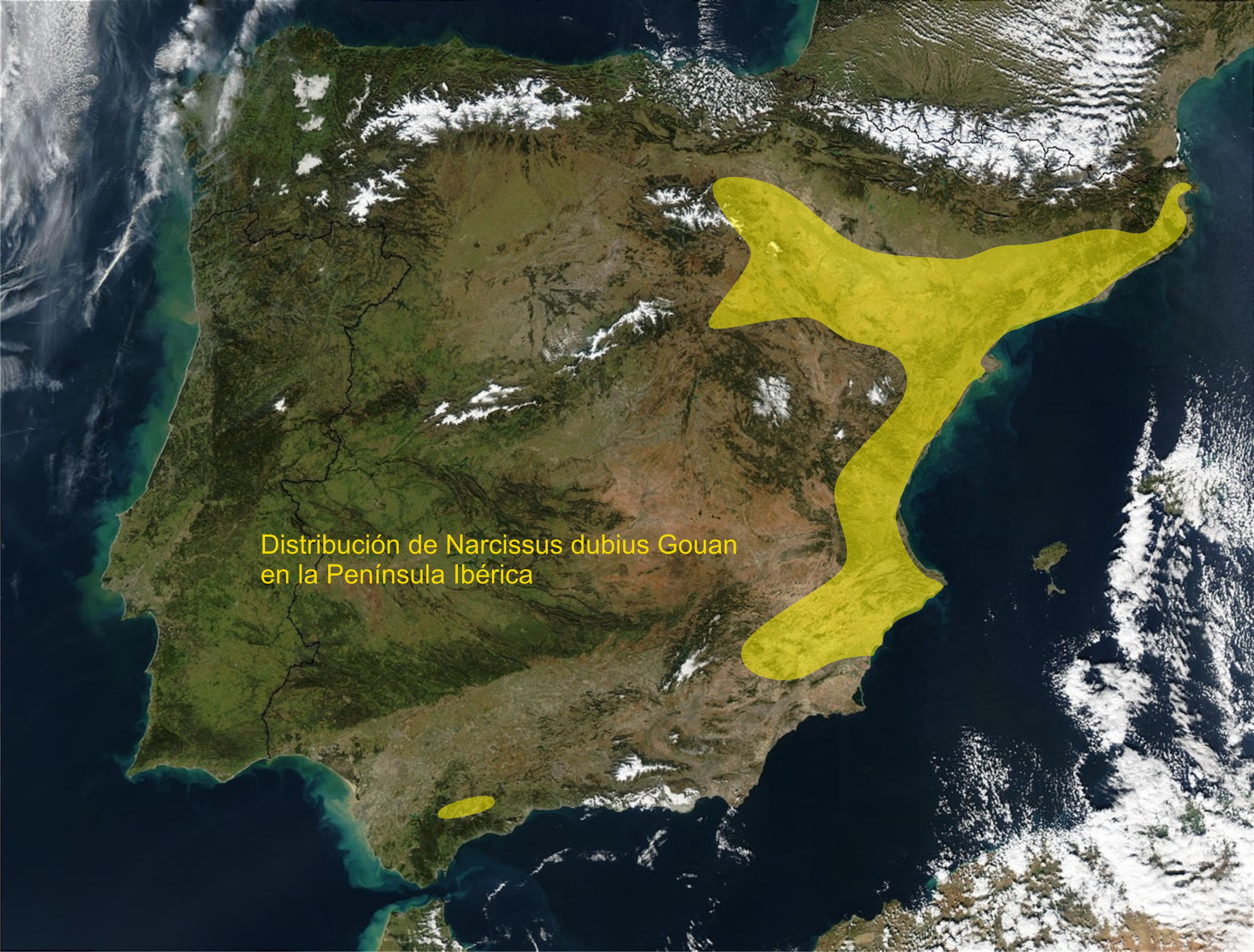
- Distribution range

Synonyms
- List: Narcissus humilis Heynh.; Helena pumila Haw.; Hermione dubia (Gouan) Haw.; Hermione micrantha Jord. & Fourr.; Narcissus assoanus var. pallens (Freyn ex Willk.) Fern.Casas; Narcissus dubius var. micranthus (Jord. & Fourr.) Asch. & Graebn.; Narcissus glaucifolius Pourr.; Narcissus humilis Heynh.; Narcissus linnaeanus subsp. dubius (Gouan) Rouy; Narcissus micranthus (Jord. & Fourr.) Rouy; Narcissus pallens Freyn ex Willk.; Narcissus pallidus Poir.; Narcissus pumilus Delile; Narcissus requienii var. pallens (Freyn ex Willk.) A.Fern.; Narcissus tazetta subsp. dubius (Gouan) K.Richt.; Narcissus tazetta subsp. micranthus (Jord. & Fourr.) K.Richt.; Queltia pallida (Poir.) Salisb.

= Narcissus dubius =

Species of daffodil

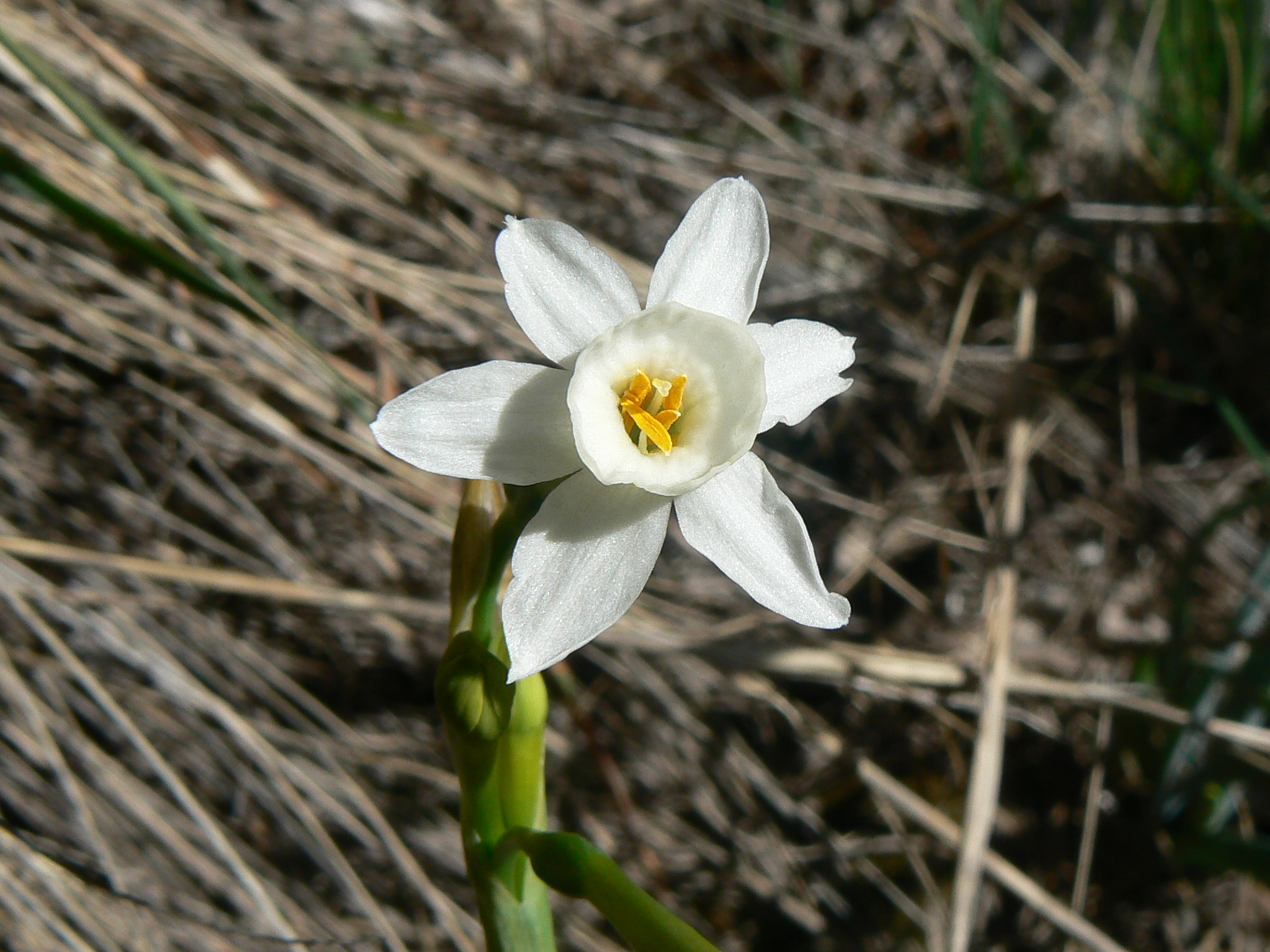

Narcissus dubius (Spanish: meados de zorro) is a species of the genus Narcissus (daffodils) in the family Amaryllidaceae. It is classified in Section Tazettae and is native to northeastern Spain.

== Description ==
Narcissus dubius is a bulbous plant with completely white petals and trumpet, and produces up to six flowers per umbel. Genetic studies indicate that it may be a hybrid of Narcissus assoanus and Narcissus papyraceus. Its range spans Spain and France.

It may be confused with the closely related species Narcissus tazetta, which has a yellow trumpet. Narcissus dubius may also be mistaken for Narcissus papyraceus, which is similar in appearance but twice as large.

== Taxonomy ==
Narcissus dubius was described in 1773 by French botanist and Ichthyology Antoine Gouan in his book Illustrationes et Observationes Botanicae 22. It has 25 pairs of chromosomes.
