= Blue Gardenia =

Blue Gardenia may refer to:

- The Blue Gardenia, a 1953 film
- Blue Gardenia (song), a song for the film above, written by Bob Russell and Lester Lee, which became a jazz standard, performed by Nat King Cole, Dinah Washington, and others
- Blue Gardenia (album), a 2001 album by Etta James

== See also ==
- Gardenia
- Gardenia (disambiguation)
