= Omeretta the Great =

American rapper (born 1996)

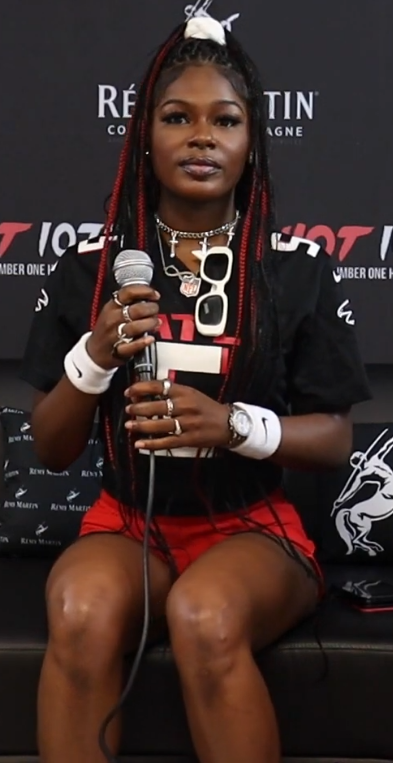
- Omeretta the Great in 2022

Background information
- Born: Amaria Williams; June 20, 1996 (age 30); Atlanta, Georgia, U.S.
- Genres: Rap
- Occupation: Rapper
- Years active: 2016–present

Amaria Williams, better known by her artistic name Omeretta the Great (born June 20, 1996), is an American rapper. She has become famous for songs such as "Sorry Not Sorry" and "Mr. Right". She was also a cast member of the first part of season 10 of Love & Hip Hop: Atlanta.

== Biography ==
=== Early life ===
Omeretta was born on June 20, 1996 in Atlanta, Georgia, and grew up in Atlanta's Zone 3. Her father died while she was young and experienced hardships in childhood due to this. She began showing talent in the arts at age 7, began rapping at age 12, and started to release songs online at 13. She attended Savannah State University in Savannah, but left the school to support her family financially while also pursuing her rap career. Her inspirations in music included T.I., Rihanna, Young Jeezy, Lil Wayne, Eminem, and Tupac.

=== Career ===
She initially garnered attention after being reposted by Nicki Minaj after she competed in an online contest hosted by Minaj. She released her debut album, Black Magic: A Dose of Reality, in 2016, through her own label Omeretta Records. This would be followed by C2z3, Vol. 1 in 2017 and Trapped in 2018. She released the album Welcome to the Jungle in 2019, which includes collaborations with YFN Lucci.

Omeretta was a participant in the 10th season of Love & Hip Hop: Atlanta in 2021. She left after the first part of the 10th season as she felt they focused more on the drama on the show versus her progression as a musical artist.

Omeretta released the EP Emotional Gangsta in 2022. Her song "Sorry Not Sorry" became viral and a source of debate among Atlanta-based artists such as T.I. and Latto due to lyrics outlining the differences between the city of Atlanta and various suburbs. The song was later remixed by Latto (with a collaboration with Omeretta) and was featured at the Balmain fashion show. She signed with Sparta Distribution, a subsidiary of 300 Entertainment, that year. She has also collaborated with Nathaniel The Great, Trap Main, SLiC CheauxLove, Maya B, Paris Heart, Lil Donald, and Killumantii.

She performed at South by Southwest in 2022, later followed up by a performance at the Strength of a Woman Festival, created by Mary J. Blige. She appeared at CultureCon and Rolling Loud that same year.

In 2023, she released the single "Put It on Da Floor (RettaMix)".

=== Personal life ===
As of 2022, Omeretta the Great is engaged to Ta'Byron Smith.

Omeretta has also expressed interest in becoming part of the fashion industry, seeing Rihanna as an inspiration in that realm.

== Discography ==
=== Albums ===
- Black Magic: A Dose of Reality (2016)
- C2z3, Vol. 1 (2017)
- Trapped (2018)
- Welcome to the Jungle (2019)

=== EPs ===
- Emotional Gangsta (2022)
