= Love & Hip Hop: Atlanta season 10 =

Season of television series

Love & Hip Hop: Atlanta
- Season 10
- Cover used by the iTunes Store
- Starring: Rasheeda & Kirk Frost; Yung Baby Tate; Sierra Gates; Erica Mena & Safaree; Omeretta the Great; Spice; Yandy & Mendeecees Harris; Joc & Kendra; Scrappy & Bambi
- No. of episodes: 29

Release
- Original network: VH1
- Original release: July 5, 2021 – November 21, 2022

Season chronology
- ← Previous; Season 9

The tenth season of the reality television series Love & Hip Hop: Atlanta aired on VH1 from July 5, 2021 until November 21, 2022. The season was primarily filmed in Atlanta, Georgia. It is executive produced by Mona Scott-Young and Stephanie R. Gayle for Monami Productions and Lashan Browning, Donna Edge-Rachell, Paris Bauldwin, Daniel Wiener and Jamail Shelton for New Group Productions. Sitarah Pendelton and Phakiso Collins are executive producers for VH1.

The series chronicles the lives of several women and men in the Atlanta area, involved in hip hop music. It consists of 29 episodes, including a two-part reunion special hosted by Claudia Jordan.

== Production ==
Filming for season ten of Love & Hip Hop: Atlanta began in February 2021.

On June 7, 2021, VH1 announced the show's return for a tenth season, which premiered on July 5, 2021. It saw the promotion of Kirk Frost, Erica Mena and Safaree to the main cast, and the addition of rappers Yung Baby Tate and Omeretta the Great, along with Love & Hip Hop: New York's Yandy Smith-Harris and Mendeecees Harris. Karlie Redd, Scrappy and Joc were demoted to supporting cast, along with new cast member Renni Rucci, Rasheeda and Kirk's son Ky Frost, Yandy's foster daughter Infinity and her mother-in-law Judy Harris, Karlie's daughter Jasmine, Joc's son Amoni, Sierra's boyfriend Eric and Spice's boyfriend Justin Budd. The season was preceded by the special Love & Hip Hop Atlanta: Inside the A.

On July 11, 2022, VH1 announced that additional episodes would air from August 8, 2022.

== Synopsis ==
The past ten years might have been one wild ride, but 2020 served up more than anyone could imagine. Now we're able to work harder, live harder, and fight to make change for the better. We're standing up for ourselves and our future. Embracing new love, new faces and going places we've never gone before.

— Rasheeda, opening monologue

== Cast ==
=== Part 1 ===
Starring

- Rasheeda (11 episodes)
- Kirk Frost (12 episodes)
- Yung Baby Tate (7 episodes)
- Sierra Gates (9 episodes)
- Erica Mena (11 episodes)
- Safaree Samuels (10 episodes)
- Omeretta the Great (4 episodes)
- Spice (5 episodes)
- Yandy Smith Harris (11 episodes)
- Mendeecees Harris (11 episodes)

Also starring

- Bambi Benson (8 episodes)
- Yung Joc (7 episodes)
- Lil Scrappy (7 episodes)
- BK Brasco (3 episodes)
- Karlie Redd (9 episodes)
- Kelsie Frost (3 episodes)
- Ky Frost (5 episodes)
- Infinity Gilyard (4 episodes)
- Shirleen Harvell (3 episodes)
- Renni Rucci (4 episodes)
- Jasmine Ellis (6 episodes)
- Momma Dee (5 episodes)
- Judy Harris (2 episodes)
- Erica Dixon (5 episodes)
- Eric Whitehead (4 episodes)
- Justin Budd (3 episodes)
- Amoni Robinson (4 episodes)

=== Part 2 ===
Starring

- Rasheeda (12 episodes)
- Kirk Frost (12 episodes)
- Spice (15 episodes)
- Erica Mena (12 episodes)
- Safaree Samuels (12 episodes)
- Sierra Gates (15 episodes)
- Yandy Smith Harris (9 episodes)
- Mendeecees Harris (10 episodes)
- Yung Joc (13 episodes)
- Kendra Robinson (13 episodes)
- Lil Scrappy (11 episodes)
- Bambi Benson (12 episodes)

Also starring

- Renni Rucci (9 episodes)
- Karlie Redd (13 episodes)
- Shekinah Anderson (13 episodes)
- Eric Whitehead (10 episodes)
- Rich Dollaz (6 episodes)
- Momma Dee (9 episodes)
- Meda Montana (12 episodes)
- Lil Mendeecees (5 episodes)
- Mimi Faust (2 episodes)

Lamar Odom, Guapdad 4000, Shaggy, Trick Daddy and Queen Naija appear in guest roles. Love & Hip Hop: Hollywood's Brittany B., Love & Hip Hop: Miami's Trick Daddy and Love & Hip Hop: New York's Jonathan Fernandez and Cyn Santana make crossover appearances.

== Episodes ==
No. overall	No. in season	Title	Original release date	US viewers (millions)
Part 1
152	1	"The New Normal"	July 5, 2021	0.95
Yandy and Mendeecees move to Atlanta. Yung Baby Tate enjoys her viral success. Erica and Bambi compare their marital issues. Sierra and BK meet up. guest stars: Ralph (Yandy's dad), Lakisha (Yandy's cousin), Taylor (Yung Baby Tate's friend), Courtney (Yung Baby Tate's best friend), Floss (Yung Baby Tate's friend), Chrystel (Yung Baby Tate's friend), Karter, Camille "Fat Kim" (Sierra's sister), Quinn (Yung Baby Tate's manager); Kirk, Yung Baby Tate, Erica, Safaree, Omeretta, Yandy and Mendeecees are added to the opening credits, replacing departing cast members Mimi, Scrapp, and Stevie J. Karlie, Joc and Scrappy are demoted to the supporting cast. Although credited, Omeretta and Spice do not appear.
153	2	"Good Trouble"	July 12, 2021	0.84
Yandy organizes a protest after the murder of Breonna Taylor. Omeretta the Great attempts to resolve her issues with her mother. Rasheeda and Kirk try to end a family drama. guest stars: Karter, Kirk Jr., Ciara (Kirk Jr.'s girlfriend), Amina (Ky's girlfriend), Tamika Palmer (Breonna Taylor's mother), Lisa (Erica's sister), Tony (the Frost's accountant), Mysonne Linen (co-founder, Until Freedom), Sean Ali (Muhammad Ali's cousin), Akilah (Omeretta's mother), Tamika Mallory, Porsha Williams; Ky and Kelsie join the supporting cast. Although credited, Sierra, Safaree and Spice do not appear.
154	3	"Oh, Baby!"	July 19, 2021	0.62
Karlie introduces her new relationship to the group. Yung Baby Tate visits her man in Los Angeles. Erica announces her pregnancy to Safaree. Yandy reunites with her adopted daughter Infinity to work out their issues. guest stars: Lamar Odom, Guapdad 4000, Lil Mendeecees, Aasim, Brittany B., Infinity; Although credited, Sierra and Omeretta do not appear.
155	4	"Blast From The Past"	July 26, 2021	0.71
Tensions between Infinity and Mendeecees resurface. Yung Baby Tate and Guap's relationship breaks down. Rasheeda confronts her older sister. Erica reveals the gender of her baby. guest stars: Dr. Jackie Walters, MD (Erica's OB/GYN), Quinn (Yung Baby Tate's manager), Guapdad 4000, Karter, Aasim, Lil Mendeecees, Skylar, Omere, Allison (Rasheeda's aunt), Marie (Rasheeda's grandmother), Cheryl "Boobie" (Rasheeda's sister), Safire; Infinity joins the supporting cast. Although credited, Sierra, Omeretta and Spice do not appear.
156	5	"A Ruff Road"	August 2, 2021	0.73
Kirk and Safaree travel to New York to honor late rapper DMX. Renni Rucci is about to begin her tour. Omeretta and her mother try to resolve their issues. Sierra is confronted by her twin sisters. guest stars: Zoe Dupree (Renni Rucci's wardrobe stylist/road manager), Hollywood (Renni Rucci's friend), Don Pressure (Omeretta the Great's brother), Khadijah (Omeretta the Great's sister), Kim (Sierra's mother), Jodi (Sierra's best friend), Al Capone (Kirk's best friend), Wheelie Wayne (Kirk's close friend), Coyshea (Kirk's close friend), Jackie (Renni Rucci's mother), Cour'don, D'Couri, Akilah (Omeretta the Great's mother), Aminah (Omeretta's cousin), Shirley (Safaree's mother), Christopher (Kirk's son), Annette (Christopher's girlfriend), Laylah (Christopher's daughter), Maleni (Christopher's daughter), Camille "Fat Kim" (Sierra's sister), Caleia (Sierra's sister); Renni Rucci joins the supporting cast. Although credited, Rasheeda, Yung Baby Tate, Erica, Spice, Yandy and Mendeecees do not appear.
157	6	"Shape Up or Ship Out"	August 9, 2021	0.73
Karlie invites her daughter to a boat trip with Lamar and the others. Safaree's mom visits him and Erica at the house. Yandy and Mendeecees sit down with Infinity. guest stars: Safire, Lil Mendeecees, Lamar Odom, Kendra (Joc's fiancee), Cheryl "Boobie" (Rasheeda's sister), Simone (Rasheeda's niece), Shirley (Safaree's mother); Jasmine joins the supporting cast. Although credited, Yung Baby Tate and Omeretta do not appear.
158	7	"See You at the Crossroads"	August 16, 2021	0.79
Spice introduces her new man to the group. Omeretta makes peace with her mother. Joc has a heart to heart with his son Amoni. Safaree storms out of his baby shower, reducing Erica to tears. guest stars: Shaggy, Justin "JBudd" (Spice's boyfriend), Khadijah (Omeretta the Great's sister), Wanda Cooper Jones (Ahmaud Arbery's mother), Mysonne Linen (co-founder, Until Freedom), Lil Mendeecees, Nausaun Linen (Mysonne Linen's son), Tamika Mallory, Tarique Ryans (Tamika Mallory's son), Akilah (Omeretta the Great's mother), Nicholas, Nicholatoy, Amoni; Although credited, Yung Baby Tate does not appear.
159	8	"Excess Baggage"	August 23, 2021	0.71
Yandy and Mendeecees decide to renew their vows and invite the group to Dubai. Yung Baby Tate goes on a date with a girl. Erica deals with a break in at home. Rasheeda thinks she might be pregnant. Joc's resolution with his son ends up in flames as emotions boil over. guest stars: Trick Daddy, Floss (Yung Baby Tate's friend), Queen Naija, Fatima (Amoni's mother), Yada, Eric (Sierra's boyfriend), Amoni cameo: Erica Dixon Although credited, Omeretta and Spice do not appear.
160	9	"Mama Drama"	August 30, 2021	0.76
Momma Dee visits the crew in Dubai and escalates the tensions between Yandy and Mendeeces' mother Judy. Jasmine brings her new man onto the trip, angering Karlie. Renni confronts her mother. Rasheeda takes a pregnancy test. guest stars: Eric (Sierra's boyfriend), Kory "KP" (Jasmine's boyfriend), Hollywood (Renni Rucci's friend), Zoe Dupree (Renni Rucci's wardrobe stylist/road manager), Emani, D'Couri, Cour'don, Jackie (Renni Rucci's mom); Judy joins the supporting cast. Although credited, Yung Baby Tate, Erica, Safaree, Omeretta and Spice do not appear.
161	10	"For Better or For Worse"	September 6, 2021	0.73
Yandy and Mendeecees renew their vows. Sierra and Eric's relationship deepens. Back in Atlanta, Erica is dealing with her pregnancy alone. guest stars: Lil Mendeecees, Jonathan (Yandy's friend), CeeCee (Bambi's mom); Eric joins the supporting cast. Although credited, Yung Baby Tate, Safaree, Omeretta and Spice do not appear.
162	11	"Face the Music"	September 13, 2021	0.77
Spice's television appearance gets her in trouble with her man. Things get worse between Renni Rucci and her mother. guest stars: Nicholatoy, Nicholas, Hollywood (Renni Rucci's friend), Breland, Xylo, Safire, Courtney (Yung Baby Tate's best friend), Brittany B., Taylor (Yung Baby Tate's friend), Charlamagne tha God, King (Spice's co-manager), Stacia Mac (Spice's co-manager), Shaggy, Sean Paul, Wendy Williams, Jackie (Renni Rucci's mom), Deanna (Erica's business partner/friend), Adamma (Safaree's lawyer); Justin joins the supporting cast. Although credited, Rasheeda, Kirk, Sierra, Omeretta, Yandy and Mendeecees do not appear.
163	12	"Old Wounds"	September 20, 2021	0.73
Erica begins divorce proceedings. Yandy opens her shop. Joc and Amoni mend things. Rasheeda and Kirk confront their staff for stealing food. guest stars: Randall Kessler (Erica's attorney), Varmar (assistant manager), Ciara (Kirk Jr.'s girlfriend), Kirk Jr., Kendra (Joc's fiancee), Dr. C.H. Braddy (senior pastor), Fatima (Amoni's mother) cameo: Cyn Santana, Jonathan Amoni joins the supporting cast. Although credited, Yung Baby Tate, Omeretta and Spice do not appear.
164	13	"Family Over Everything"	September 27, 2021	0.68
Scrappy deals with his mental health issues. Spice mends things with Justin. Rasheeda and Kirk fire their children after a brawl at their event. guest stars: Amina (Ky's girlfriend), Ciara (Kirk Jr.'s girlfriend), Kirk Jr., Lil Mendeecees cameo: Kendra
Part 2
165	14	"Get Off My Joc"	August 8, 2022	0.76
Joc and Kendra plan their wedding, but secrets in the dark threaten their upcoming nuptiuals. Renni announces her engagement to her man in jail. Sierra reconsiders her relationship with Eric. guest stars: Meda (Spice's friend), Yemi Alade (Nigerian singer/songwriter), Michael (choreographer), Justin "JBudd" (Spice's boyfriend), Fenise (Spice's sister), Stacia Mac (Spice's friend), Amir (Joc's son), Jubi (Joc's cousin), Amoni (Joc's son), Chino (Joc's best man); Joc, Kendra, Scrappy and Bambi are added to the opening credits, replacing departing cast members Yung Baby Tate and Omeretta. Although credited, Yandy, Scrappy and Bambi do not appear.
166	15	"Taste of Your Own Meda-cine"	August 15, 2022	0.62
Spice's friend exposes Joc about their relationship. Sierra wonders if she should tell Kendra. Rasheeda clashes with her father on his impending visit. guest stars: Meda (Spice's friend), Shirleen (Rasheeda's mother), Sina, Omere, Skylar, Lil Mendeecees, Lakisha (Yandy's cousin), Laura (Yandy's mother), Shaggy, Reco Chapple (designer), Ebony (Joc's sister), Harold (Rasheeda's father); Although credited, Erica, Safaree, Mendeecees, Scrappy and Bambi do not appear.
167	16	"I Do, Do You?"	August 22, 2022	0.72
Renni's mom gets into a car accident. Kendra and Joc struggle to make it down the aisle. guest stars: Chino (Joc's best man), Reco Chapple (designer), Phyllis (Kendra's mom), D'Couri (Renni's daughter), Rayon-Brittney (Renni's sister), Damarion & Isaiah (Rayon's sons), Sir Malcolm (Renni's brother), Camille "Fat Kim", Clydaria, Caleia (Sierra's sisters), Kim (Sierra's mother), Justin "JBudd" (Spice's boyfriend), Alex (Joc's ex-wife), Michael (Kendra's brother); Although credited, Scrappy and Bambi do not appear.
168	17	"Heirs to the Throne"	August 29, 2022	0.65
Kendra and Joc finally get married, but rumors swirl that he got another woman pregnant. Momma Dee and Bambi struggle to bury the hatchet. Spice refuses to collaborate with Karlie. guest stars: Kountry "Drip" Wayne (Joc's friend), Phyllis (Kendra's mom), Jasmine (Karlie's daughter), Keisha (founder/CEO Legacy Records), Sir Malcom (Renni's brother)
169	18	"Baby Bump in the Road"	September 5, 2022	0.70
Spice is nominated for a Grammy. Sierra gets robbed. Bambi and Erica try to help Kendra get the bottom of Joc and Meda's relationship. guest stars: Fenise (Spice's sister), Meda (Spice's friend), Angela Hamilton (Spice's mom), Tracy (Eric's mom), Kim (Sierra's mother); Although credited, Rasheeda, Kirk, Safaree, Yandy and Mendeecees do not appear.
170	19	"Graci Under Fire"	September 12, 2022	0.59
Bambi and Erica confront Meda at Spice's fashion show. Sierra moves into a new house. guest stars: Kim (Sierra's mother), Veronica (Sierra's realtor), Nicky (Sierra's interior designer), Justin "JBudd" (Spice's boyfriend); Meda joins the supporting cast. Although credited, Rasheeda, Kirk, Yandy, Mendeecees, Joc and Kendra do not appear.
171	20	"Heart Of The Matter"	September 19, 2022	0.67
Mendeecees encourages Yandy to mend her relationship with Lil Mendeecees' mother. Joc and Kendra seek spiritual advice. guest stars: Shasha (Mendeecees' cousin), Dr. C.H. Braddy (senior pastor), Omere, Skylar, Chino (Joc's best man), Ebony (Joc's sister), Kim (Sierra's mother); Lil Mendeecees joins the supporting cast. Although credited, Rasheeda, Kirk, Spice, Erica, Safaree, Scrappy and Bambi do not appear.
172	21	"Who's Your Daddy?"	September 26, 2022	0.52
Sierra and Eric are engaged. Safaree asks for a DNA test. Rasheeda's father visits. Renni's mother dies. guest stars: Popeye Caution (artist), Jodi (Sierra's best friend), Harold (Rasheeda's father), Andrea Bentley (pastor); Although credited, Yandy does not appear.
173	22	"Carpe DM'd"	October 3, 2022	0.59
Rasheeda and her father attempt to bond. Momma Dee and Bambi continue to clash. Kendra confronts Meda. guest stars: Harold (Rasheeda's father), Karter, Ky, CJ, Justin "JBudd" (Spice's boyfriend); Although credited, Erica, Safaree, Sierra, Yandy and Mendeecees do not appear.
174	23	"Salty Spice"	October 10, 2022	0.57
Meda throws Spice a party, where the cast are forced together for the first time. guest stars: Chino (Joc's best man), Justin "JBudd" (Spice's boyfriend)
175	24	"Show-Down Girls"	October 17, 2022	0.64
Mendeecees tries to get Yandy to bury the hatchet with his baby mama Samantha. The cast head to Vegas for Grammy week where Karlie has a video shoot. guest stars: DeMarco (producer), Samantha (Lil Mendeeces' mother), Mario (Samantha's fiancé), Justin "JBudd" (Spice's boyfriend); Although credited, Rasheeda, Kirk, Joc, Kendra and Scrappy do not appear.
176	25	"Thirsty Thots"	October 24, 2022	0.55
Momma Dee stirs up more drama. Yandy reunites Samantha up with her cousin Kisha. Erica discovers Safaree is dating someone new. guest stars: Kisha (Yandy's cousin), Samantha (Lil Mendeeces' mother), Mario (Samantha's fiancé), Ralph (Yandy's dad), Laura (Yandy's mother), Kimbella (Safaree's "friend"), Justin "JBudd" (Spice's boyfriend); Although credited, Joc and Kendra do not appear
177	26	"Tears & Loathing In Las Vegas"	October 31, 2022	0.51
Safaree brings his new girl to Shekinah's event. Fights break out at Karlie's pool party. guest stars: Ms. Vicky (Joc's mom), Takwaime (Joc's brother), Dr. C.H. Braddy (senior pastor), Kimbella (Safaree's "friend"), Justin "JBudd" (Spice's boyfriend); Mimi returns as a supporting cast member. Although credited, Erica, Yandy and Mendeecees do not appear.
178	27	"No Scrapp Left Behind"	November 7, 2022	0.55
Spice loses on Grammy Night. Scrappy and Momma Dee have an intense showdown. Erica and Safaree's divorce is finalised. guest stars: Michael (Kendra’s brother), Phyllis (Kendra’s mom), Justin “JBudd” (Spice’s boyfriend); Although credited, Yandy and Mendeecees do not appear.
179	28	"Reunion – Part 1"	November 14, 2022	0.57
After a year of filming, the cast come back together for the first time and discuss the drama that went down this season. host: Claudia Jordan
180	29	"Reunion – Part 2"	November 21, 2022	0.53
The reunion continues as old wounds are reopened and feuds are restarted. host: Claudia Jordan guest stars: Harold Buckner

== Webisodes ==
=== Check Yourself ===
Love & Hip Hop Atlanta: Check Yourself, which features the cast's reactions to each episode, was released weekly with every episode on digital platforms.

=== Bonus scenes ===
Deleted scenes from the season's episodes were released weekly as bonus content on VH1's official website.
