= Gucci (Bree Runway and Maliibu Miitch song) =

Single by Bree Runway and Maliibu Miitch

from the album 2000and4Eva
- Released: 23 July 2020
- Recorded: 2020
- Genre: Trap
- Length: 3:01
- Label: Virgin EMI
- Songwriter(s): Brenda Mensah; Victor May; Disco Rick; Moon Willis; Cleveland Bell
- Producer(s): Moon Willis

Bree Runway singles chronology
"XS (Remix)" (2020)	"Gucci" (2020)	"Little Nokia" (2020)

Maliibu Miitch singles chronology
"Let's Be Honest" (2020)	"Gucci" (2020)

"Gucci" is a song by British rapper and singer-songwriter Bree Runway and American rapper Maliibu Miitch, released on 23 July 2020 as the third single from Runway's debut mixtape, 2000AND4EVA, which was released on November 6, 2020 via EMI Records.

== Background ==
Runway announced the single on her social media on 19 July 2020. The single was revealed alongside its cover art and a countdown timer towards the song's release by having fans enter the song's title into her website as a password. In anticipation of the single's release, Runway would tweet behind the scenes stills of the music video and lyrics of the song.

The single follows Runway's previous two releases "Apeshit" and "Damn Daniel", the latter being a collaboration with Yung Baby Tate which were both released earlier in 2020. All singles are included on Runway's debut mixtape, 2000and4Eva, which delves into "unlocking more of herself". When reflecting on the mixtape, Runway states; "I’ve had to face myself head on during lockdown. A lot of those sad times and moments I’m scared of will pop up here."

== Music video ==
Instead of focusing on the pain, I chose to be excellent and luxurious. I chose to adore my skin and celebrate my African features, and to ooze opulence. I'm a special diamond, and although sometimes the world wants to rob me of that perception, I refuse to forget, and I hope everyone listening and watching feels and channels that energy. We're special. Don't you ever forget.

—Bree Runway talking about Gucci's music video

A music video, directed by Tash Tung, was shot in isolation due to the COVID-19 pandemic and was released alongside the song on 23 July 2020. Miitch and Runway shot their respective parts of the video separately. The video consists of Runway being inside a diamond that a miner discovered whilst Miitch appears on a screen which Runway poses with in a white background.

Runway sports various glamorous outfits throughout the video which she states has a deeper meaning in an interview with Paper, "being Black is a joy and my biggest blessing". Despite being "heavily reminded of the pain, the lack of privilege and trauma attach to my complexion," Runway views the song as an empowerment anthem and has decided to continue being "her Black and excellent self".

A dance video was announced on 17 August 2020 via Runway's social media accounts. The video was released the following day.

== Critical reception ==
Sandra Song of Paper praised the song stating that the song is a, "powerful yet playful anthem that's celebratory with plenty of cheek".

The song would be featured on i-D magazine's "The Best New Music" playlist.
