= Savoir Adore =

American pop-rock group duo

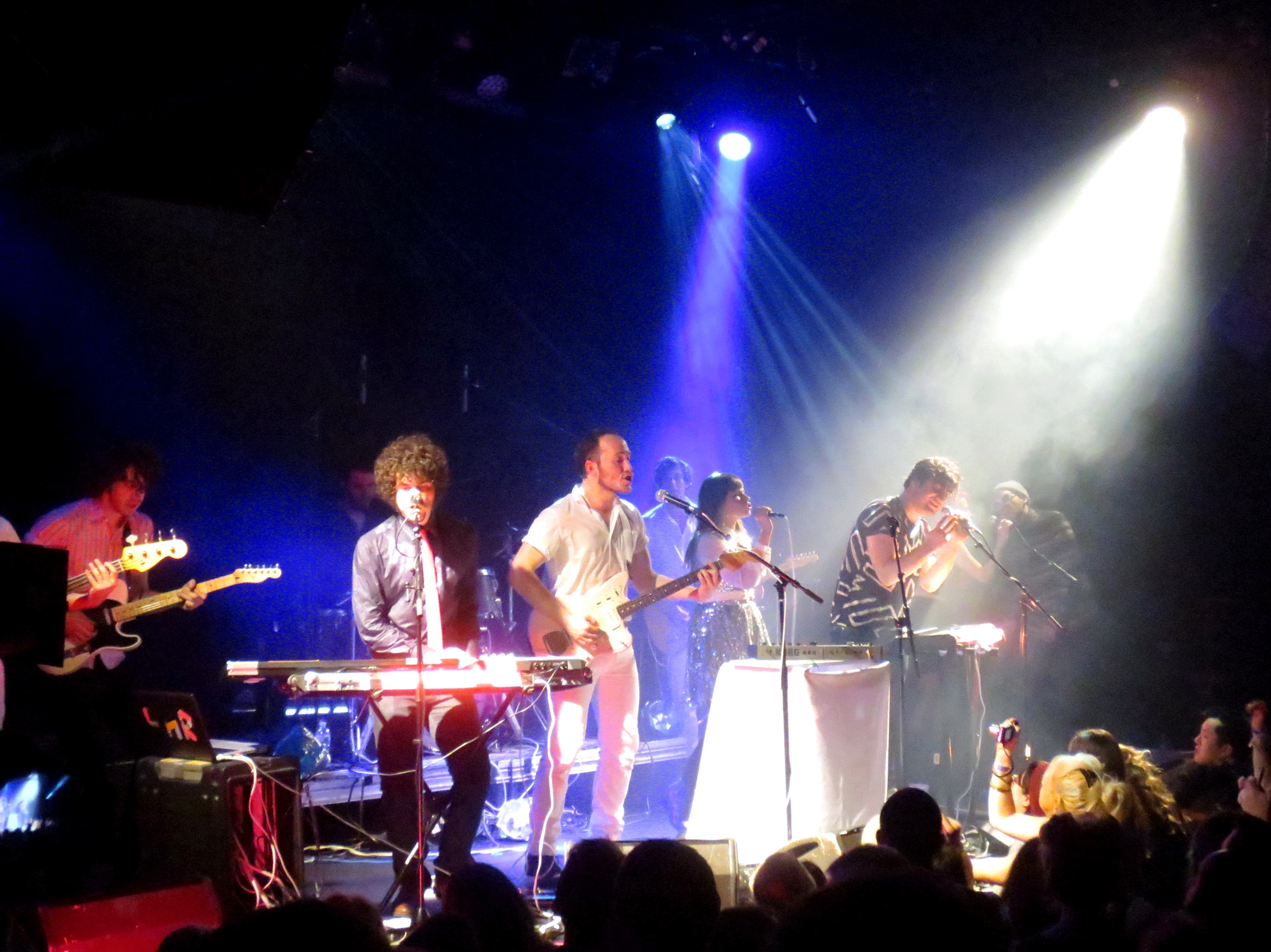

Background information
- Origin: Brooklyn, New York
- Genres: Synthpop; indie pop; dream pop; indie rock
- Years active: 2009–present
- Labels: Cantora Records; Neon Gold; Nettwerk
- Members: Paul Hammer; Lauren Zettler
- Past members: Deidre Muro
- Website: savoiradore.com

Savoir Adore is a pop-rock group duo from Brooklyn, New York City, United States initially consisting of Paul Hammer and Deidre Muro. In 2014, Deidre Muro left the band while Hammer worked with a guest vocalist. Hammer began collaborating with Lauren Zettler shortly after, and she became a permanent member. As of June 2020 the band has released five albums, several EPs, numerous singles and a number of remixes albums. They also have done an international tour.

== Career ==
Paul Hammer is the son of Jan Hammer and Ivona Reich; he developed an interest in music at an early age. A multi-instrumentalist, he recorded his first album 19 in 2004 with the help of his father.

Hammer met Muro during a song writing club at New York University. They challenged themselves "to write and record an EP in one weekend" that did not involve any acoustic instruments. One of the first experimental pieces they wrote together prompted the name Savoir Adore. After signing to the Cantora label, they released the EP The Adventures of Mr. Pumpernickel and the Girl with Animals in her throat on May 6, 2008. Although the group recorded its unique work as a pair, the dual vocalists rounded out their sound in concert with a three-piece backup band. in 2009 they released a full-length debut album, In the Wooded Forest, that described as a mix of "electro-pop and indie-rock". It was supported by the singles "We Talk Like Machines" (May 2009) and "Bodies" (2010). In 2011 they released the single "Dreamers" through Neon Gold.

For their second album, the duo launched a Kickstarter campaign and self-released the album Our Nature in October 2012. The band signed with the Popular label in the UK and Nettwerk in North America, which saw Our Nature, receive a general release on June 4, 2013. Their single "Pop Goes the World" (a cover of the 1987 song by Men Without Hats) was released on February 22, 2012 and was featured on a commercial for Tide Pods. In 2013, Muro married David Perlick-Molinari of French Horn Rebellion.

After the tour in support of Our Nature, the Muro and Hammer partnership dissolved in 2014. Hammer decided to continue to project and collaborate with other vocalists. For the album he worked with Leah Hayes, Lauren Zettler and Winslow Bright. In August 2016 the band released The Love That Remains. In the first half of 2016 a new live-band was formed consisting of Hammer, Alex Foote (guitars), Ben Marshall (drums), Andrew Pertes (bass) and Lauren Zettler (vocals/keyboards). The release was preceded by the single "Giants".

== Discography ==
Studio albums
Year	Title
2009	In the Wooded Forest
2012	Our Nature
2016	The Love That Remains
2019	Full Bloom
2020	Image Tapes Vol. 1.

Extended plays (EPs)
Year	Title
2008	The Adventures of Mr. Pumpernickel and the Girl With Animals in Her Throat
2010	Bodies
2010	We Talk Like Machines
2012	Dreamers
2016	The Love That Remains - Acoustic
2019	Full Bloom (Acoustic)

Singles
Year	Title
2010	Loveliest Creature
2016	Giants
2016	Paradise Gold
2017	Too Late
2018	Slow Motion
2018	When the Summer Ends
2018	Black and Blue
2019	Body Heat

Remixes albums
Year	Title
2014	Our Nature: The Remixes
2016	Paradise Gold Remixes
2018	When the Summer Ends (Remixes)

== Usage in media ==
Their single Dreamers was featured as a soundtrack in Konami's video game Pro Evolution Soccer 2013. The group recognises the impact it has made on their popularity as Paul Hammer said "That's honestly such a huge part of what brought us down to South America and to Brazil" and "[Dreamers] is a song that did a lot for us. [...] We started travelling around the world, we got to play for a lot more people and we got our first bigger record deals which really did so much for us".
