= List of ships named Gardenia =

A number of ships have been named Gardenia, after the plant.

- USS Gardenia, a former lighthouse tender in service 1917–19
- HMS Gardenia a Flower-class corvette in service 1940–42
- MV Gardenia (1978), a Cypriot ferry in service 2002–12
- MV Gardenia (2008), a Tanzanian oil tanker in service in 2012
