= Be Runway =

EP by Bree Runway
- Released: 16 August 2019
- Recorded: Spring 2019
- Genres: Pop; R&B
- Length: 13:44
- Label: Virgin EMI
- Producers: Fat Max Gsus; 808Charmer; Kilian & Jo; Moon Willis

Bree Runway chronology
Bouji (2016)	Be Runway (2019)	2000and4Eva (2020)

Singles from Be Runway
- 1. "2ON" Released: 24 May 2019; 2. "Big Racks" Released: 5 July 2019; 3. "All Night" Released: 21 August 2019

Be Runway is the third extended play by British singer and rapper Bree Runway, released on 16 August 2019 through Virgin EMI Records. It is her first extended play released under a major label and features a guest appearance from Brooke Candy. Singles "2ON" and "Big Racks" featuring Brooke Candy were previously released in anticipation for the EP.

== Background and promotion ==
"2ON" served as the lead single and was released on 24 May 2019 alongside its music video. Runway explained the meaning of the song on a Twitter post released the same day as the song. She stated "Every day we are told that we could be better, prettier, brighter – as if there’s something wrong with us in the first place? When I was younger, I couldn’t hack the amount of shade thrown at my skin tone from the playgrounds, to the boys at the bus stops after school that were equally as black to every TV show, every music video, every movie that insinuated MY black was not beautiful!”. The song would be featured on Paper Magazine's Top 50 Songs of 2019 List. "Big Racks" featuring American rapper Brooke Candy was released as the second single from the album on 5 July. The accompanying music video would receive praise for its inclusion of touching upon racial discrimination in the workplace. On 2 August Bree Runway announced the EP's release date as well as the cover art and tracklist. The EP was released on 16 August 2019. A music video for "All Night" was released on 21 August.

=== Artwork ===
In an interview, Bree discussed the artwork for the EP stating, "(the) cover is half white and half black and that in itself is a message. I want you to be free and be yourself. The darker side of it (represents) the lengths people will go to become lighter and also to become more acceptable socially and in our workplaces. For the EP, I looked at the lengths we would go to damage ourselves because of society".

== Track listing ==
Be Runway
No.	Title	Lyrics	Music	Producer(s)	Length
1.	"2ON"	Brenda Mensah	Max Grahn	Fat Max Gsus	2:55
2.	"X2C"	Mensah	808Charmer; Johannes Burger; Kilian Wilke; Moon Willis	808Charmer; Killian & Jo; Willis	2:20
3.	"All Night"	Mensah	Levi Gordon; 808Charmer; Burger; Wilke; Willis	808Charmer; Killian & Jo; Willis	3:39
4.	"Big Racks" (featuring Brooke Candy)	Mensah	Gordon; Willis	Willis	3:05
5.	"Relevant"	Mensah	Willis	Willis	1:45
Total length:					13:44

== Credits and personnel ==
Credits adapted from Tidal and organized in alphabetical order by surname.

- Johannes Burger - songwriting (2, 3)
- Brooke Candy - featured artist (4), additional vocals (4)
- Levi Gordon - songwriting (3)
- Max Grahn - songwriting (1)
- Fat Max Gsus - production,(1) songwriting (1)
- Michael Ilbert - mixing (1)
- Kilian & Jo - production (2)
- Dave Kutch - mastering (all tracks)
- Imani McFarlane - additional vocals (5)
- Todd Oliver-Fisherman - guitar (3)
- Will Reeves - mixing (3, 4)
- Raf Riley - mixing (2, 5), associated performer (4)
- Bree Runway - lead vocals, (all tracks) songwriting (all tracks)
- Kilian Wilke - songwriting (2, 3)
- Moon Willis - production (2, 3, 4, 5), songwriting (2, 3, 4, 5)
- 808Charmer - production (2, 3), songwriting (2, 3)

== Release history ==
Region	Date	Format	Label	Ref.
Various	16 August 2019	Digital download; streaming	Virgin EMI	
