= Paperwhite (band) =

American dream pop and synthpop musical duo

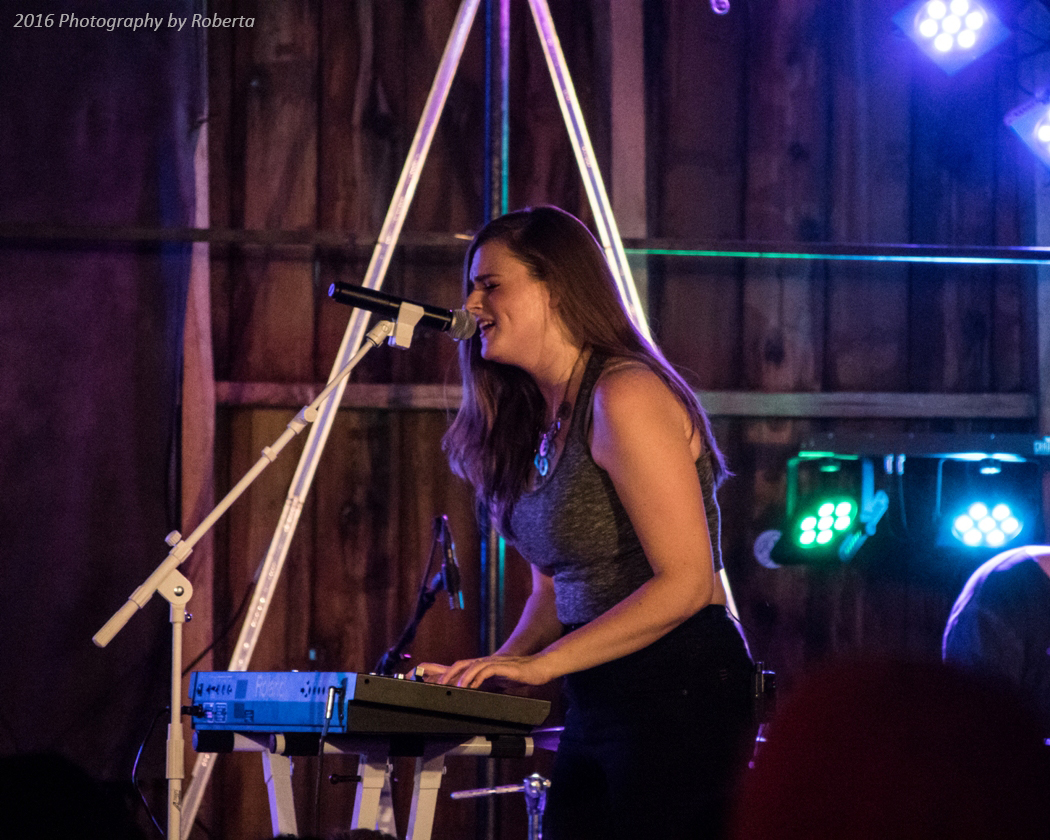

Background information
- Origin: Brooklyn, New York City, United States
- Genres: Dream pop; synthpop
- Years active: 2014–present
- Labels: Independent
- Members: Ben Marshall; Katie Marshall
- Website: paperwhitemusic.com

Paperwhite is an American dream pop and synthpop musical duo based in New York City, comprising siblings Ben & Katie Marshall.

== History ==
Ben & Katie Marshall grew up near Philadelphia, Pennsylvania. Although they had written many songs together as teenagers, they decided to form a band in 2013 after Katie, a singer-songwriter, graduated from the Berklee College of Music, where Ben had also studied. Ben is also the drummer for the band Savoir Adore. The duo took the name Paperwhite from the flower species narcissus papyraceus, also known as paperwhites; Katie worked at a florist during her years at Berklee and had written a song called "Paperwhites". Ben adopted the role of co-writing, producing, arranging and providing backing vocals to their music, while Katie focused on songwriting and singing.

Paperwhite based themselves in Brooklyn, New York City and released their debut single, "Got Me Goin'", in January 2014, the same month as their first live show. They produced remixes for Deidre & the Dark ("Skeleton") and Fickle Friends ("Swim"). The duo premiered the single "Take Me Back" in July 2014 to positive reviews from Stereogum and Complex magazine's Pigeons & Planes blog. Their song "Pieces" was premiered on The Guardian's music blog in October 2014, and Spin magazine's website streamed Paperwhite's debut EP, Magic, in November 2014. The duo performed at music festival SXSW in early 2015 and released "Get Away" on November 30, 2015. The music blog Vehlinggo said that Get Away was "genetically predisposed to make listeners dream big."

Billboard premiered the band's single "Unstoppable" on February 2, 2016, describing it as "starlit" and noting that Paperwhite had previously earned the title "Most Blogged Artist" twice on Hype Machine. Unstoppable was mastered by Chris Zane (St. Lucia, Passion Pit). Oblivious Pop stated that Unstoppable "hits you full force with a cosmic rush" and went on to say: "This duo keeps proving time and time again that they are fighting for the top spot, and with a smash this big they are miles in the lead."

BuzzFeed named Paperwhite's single Wanderlust one of the 22 Most Summer-Ready Pop Songs of 2016. The band released their latest single, Only Us, on May 12, 2017. It was picked up on Spotify's New Music Friday playlist. The blog, GoingSolo, called it "super summery" and "a feast of dreamy synth stabs, bold melodies and pounding electronic percussions"

Paperwhite initially drew inspiration from pop music of the 1980s for their output, as well as from acts such as Aphex Twin, Daft Punk, Depeche Mode, Marvin Gaye, Postal Service, Tears for Fears, and Stevie Wonder. Contemporary artists that the band have cited as influences include ASTR, Beyoncé, Broods, Chvrches, Kate Boy, and Janelle Monáe. Nylon magazine described their sound as "hazy pop".

== Discography ==
=== Extended plays ===
- Magic (2014)
- Escape (2016)
- Reach (2025)

=== Singles ===
- "Got Me Goin'" (2014)
- "Take Me Back" (2014)
- "Pieces" (2014)
- "Galaxy" (2014)
- "Get Away" (2015)
- "Unstoppable" (2016)
- "Wanderlust" (2016)
- "Human Nature" (2017)
- "Only Us" (2017)
- "Loop" (2018)
- "Count On You" (2018)
- "Waiting for You" (2020)
- "Carry On" (2020)
- "Unfold" (2024)
- "By Your Side" (2025)
- "This Feeling" (2025)

=== Remixes ===
- Animals – "Ceilings"
- Deirdre & the Dark – "Skeleton"
- Fickle Friends – "Swim"
- Luxley – "Spirit"
- The Night VI – "Sienna"
- Nova – "Lovelife"
- Ryan Star – "World I Used to Know"
