= Monogem =

American singer

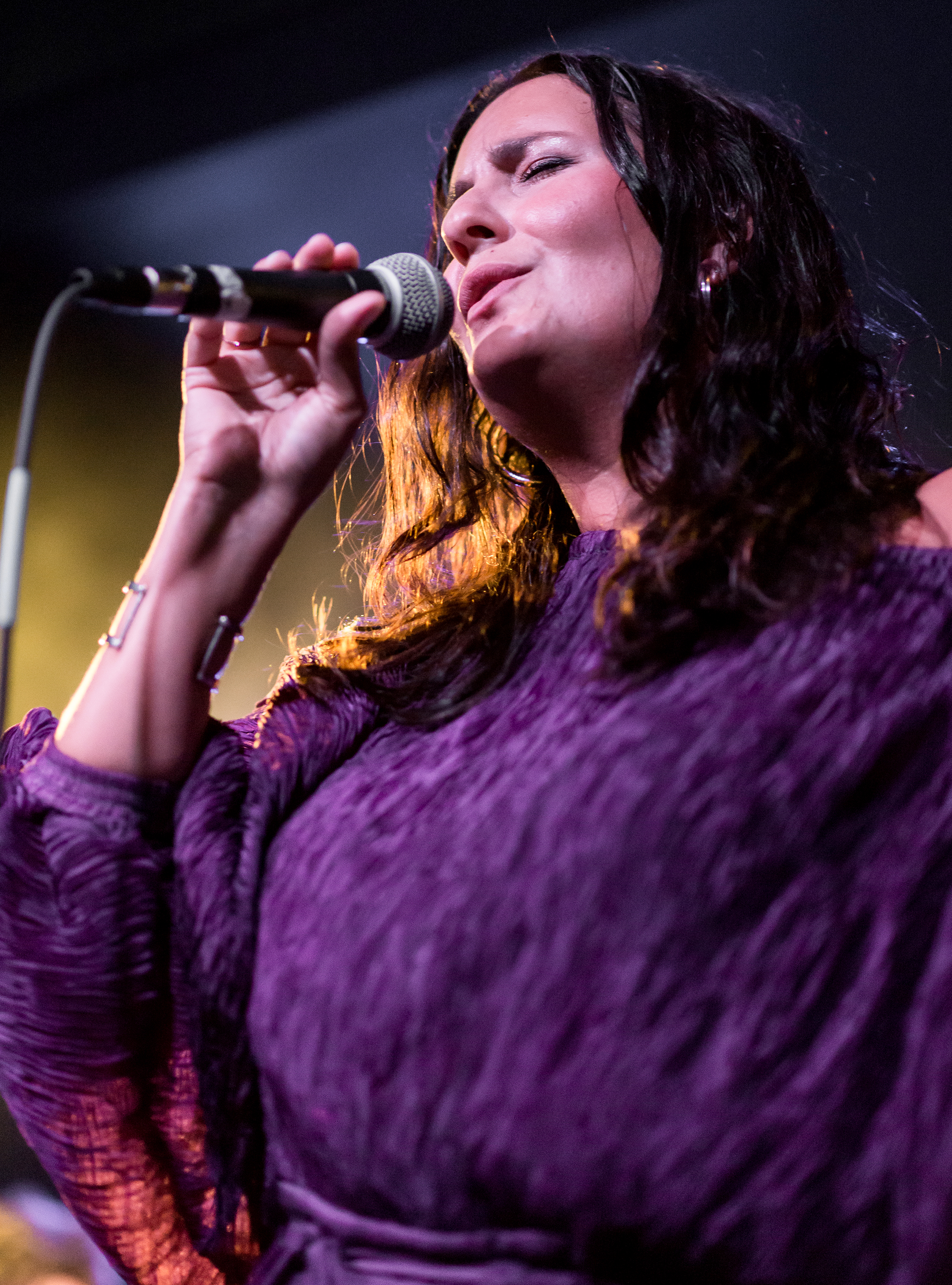
- Monogem performing live at The Echo in 2017
- Born: Jennifer Ashley Hirsh; June 25, 1986 (age 40); Agoura Hills, California, U.S.
- Education: Berklee College of Music
- Occupations: Singer; songwriter
- Years active: 2012–present
- Spouse: Jason Melvin (m. 2014)
- Children: 1
- Musical career
- Origin: Los Angeles, California, U.S.
- Genres: R&B; EDM; soul; pop; latin
- Instruments: Vocals; Piano
- Label: MONOGEM
- Website: monogem.com

Jennifer Ashley Hirsh Melvin (born June 25, 1986), known professionally as Monogem (stylized in all caps), is an American singer-songwriter. She appeared on season eleven of American Idol as a contestant, where she placed fifteenth. Her debut album, Gardenia (2021), was released independently.

In 2015, she released her self-titled debut extended play, Monogem. She later released her second extended play, 100% (2017). Two years later, she released her third extended play, So Many Ways (2019).

== Early life and education ==
Jennifer Ashley Hirsh was born and raised in Agoura Hills, California. She is of Mexican descent with her family coming from Guadalajara, Mexico. She graduated from Berklee College of Music where she studied Brazilian music.

== Musical career ==
=== 2012–2015: American Idol & Monogem ===
In 2012, Hirsh auditioned for the eleventh season of American Idol in Houston, Texas. In the semi-final round, she performed Adele's "One and Only", but was not one of the five highest female vote-getters. The judges selected her to be in the Wild Card round, and she performed "Oh! Darling" by The Beatles. Eventually, she was eliminated and did not advance to the Top 13, which she ended up in 15th place.

American Idol season 11 performances and results
Round	Theme	Song	Original artist(s)	Result
Audition	Auditioner's Choice	"You've Really Got a Hold on Me"	The Miracles	Advanced
Hollywood (Part 1)	First Solo	"Up to the Mountain"	Patty Griffin	Advanced
Hollywood (Part 2)	Group Performance	"Hold On, I'm Comin'"	Sam & Dave	Advanced
Hollywood (Part 3)	Second Solo	"Georgia on My Mind"	Ray Charles	Advanced
Las Vegas	Songs from the 1950s	"Sealed with a Kiss"	The Four Voices	Advanced
Final Judgement	Final Solo	"Baby I Love You"	Aretha Franklin	Advanced
Top 25	Personal Choice	"One and Only"	Adele	Wild Card
Wild Card	Personal Choice	"Oh! Darling"	The Beatles	Eliminated

After American Idol, Hirsh began her music career under the name of the Monogem Ring. She explained the name which is a leftover glow from one of the exploded supernova stars.

In 2013, Monogem released her debut single called, "Follow You". In 2014, she released two more singles named: "Wait and See" and "Stay With Me". A year later, she released a single called "The Glow" on January 20, 2015. They were included in Monogem's self-titled debut extended play, Monogem, on February 3, 2015. On October 9, 2015, Monogem released another single named: "Gone".

=== 2016–2020: 100% & So Many Ways ===
On April 22, 2016, a single named "Take It Slow" was released. A year later, a single called "Wild" (2017) was released. On March 29, 2017, a music video for "Wild" was released, starring Matthew RC Taylor and Coco Arquette. On April 25, 2017, another single called "100%" was released by Monogem. The four singles from October 2015 to April 2017, were included in Monogem's sophomore EP called, 100%, which was released on May 19, 2017.

After two years, three singles were released in 2019. The first single was from 2019 and is called, "Lean" which was released on May 15, 2019. On June 28, 2019, "So Many Ways" was released by Monogem, with a music video. And "Soy Lo Que Soy" was released on September 19, 2019. In the same year, a third EP named, So Many Ways was released on October 18, 2019.

In 2020, Monogem released two singles for her upcoming debut album. "Paraíso" was released on May 29, 2020; with "Bésame Mucho" being released on November 20, 2020.

=== 2021–present: Gardenia ===
On May 20, 2021, Monogem returned with another single named, "Sólo Amor" with a lyric video. On July 15, the second single for 2021 was released named "Dame La Fuerza", joined with a music video. "Magia", the lead single for Monogem's debut album, was released on August 26. Following the release of her single "Magia", Hirsh revealed in the accompanying visual video that she was expecting her first child with her husband, Jason Melvin.

Hirsh released her debut album named, Gardenia, on September 2, 2021. The debut album included one of the tracks from th So Many Ways EP, "Soy Lo Que Soy". The album's title was named in honor of Hirsh's grandmother, whose favorite flower was the gardenia. Hirsh made an announcement throughout on her social media, that she gave birth to her son in September 2021.

Monogem is currently working on a reimagined version of her debut album.

== Discography ==
Monogem discography
- Studio albums: 1
- EPs: 3
- Singles: 18

=== Studio album ===
Title	Details	Ref.
Gardenia	Released: September 2, 2021; Label: MONOGEM; Format: Digital download, streaming, vinyl	

=== Extended plays ===
List of extended plays, with selected details
Title	Details	Ref.
Monogem	Released: February 3, 2015; Label: MONOGEM; Format: Digital download, streaming	
100%	Released: May 19, 2017; Label: MONOGEM; Format: Digital download, streaming	
So Many Ways	Released: October 18, 2019; Label: MONOGEM; Format: Digital download, streaming	

=== Singles ===
List of singles, showing the year released, and album name
Title	Year	Album
"Follow You"	2013	Monogem
"Wait and See"	2014	Monogem
"Stay With Me"	2014	Monogem
"The Glow"	2015	Monogem
"Gone"	2015	100%
"Take It Slow"	2016	100%
"Wild"	2017	100%
"100%"	2017	100%
"Get You High"	2018	—N/a
"Shade"	2018	—N/a
"Lean"	2019	So Many Ways
"So Many Ways"	2019	So Many Ways
"Soy Lo Que Soy"	2019	So Many Ways
"Paraíso"	2020	Gardenia
"Bésame Mucho"	2020	Gardenia
"Sólo Amor"	2021	Gardenia
"Dame La Fuerza"	2021	Gardenia
"Magia"	2021	Gardenia

=== As a featured artist ===
Title	Year	Album	Ref.
"The End (El Final)" Plus (featuring Monogem & Nige Hood)	2022	—N/a	
"Body Breathe" LP Globbi (featuring Monogem)	2022	Light Places	
"Vale La Pena" Tim Hox & Monogem	2023		

=== Guest appearances ===
List of guest appearances, with year released, other artist(s), and album name
Title	Year	Album	Ref.
"Better With You" LENNO & Bee’s Knees (featuring Monogem)	2016	Good Thing	
"Old School" Bee's Knees (featuring Monogem)	2016	Variety Pack	
"Bank" Qveen Herby (featuring Monogem & Maliibu Miitch)	2017	EP 2	

== Filmography ==
=== Television ===
List of television credits
Year	Title	Role	Notes	Ref.
2012	American Idol (season 11)	Herself/Contestant	15th place	

=== Music videos ===
- "Wait and See" (2015)
- "Wild" (2017)
- "Get You High" (2018)
- "So Many Ways" (2019)
- "Soy Lo Que Soy" (2019)
- "Dame La Fuerza" (2021)
- "Feeling Myself" (2023)
