= Girls (Yung Baby Tate album) =

Studio album by Yung Baby Tate
- Released: February 5, 2019
- Genre: R&B
- Length: 39:19; 51:29 (deluxe)
- Label: Self-released
- Producer: Tate Farris

Yung Baby Tate chronology
Summer Lover (2018)	Girls (2019)	After the Rain (2020)

Deluxe edition cover

Singles from Girls
- 1. "Pretty Girl" Released: April 3, 2018; 2. "That Girl" Released: November 13, 2018

Girls is the debut studio album by American rapper Yung Baby Tate (later known as Baby Tate). It was self-released on February 5, 2019. The album was preceded by the singles "Pretty Girl" and "That Girl". On June 25, 2019, a deluxe version was released with four bonus tracks.

== Release and promotion ==
On April 3, 2018, Tate released "Pretty Girl", the lead single from the album. The song was re-released as a remix featuring Killumantii and Mulatto on January 16, 2019. On November 13, 2018, Tate released "That Girl" as the second single from the album. Girls, along with its tracklist and release date, was officially announced by Tate via Twitter on January 22, 2019.

A short film was released on January 29, 2019 to accompany the album and was directed by Christian Cody, who also shot the album cover. The deluxe edition of Girls was teased by Tate on her social medias in May and June 2019. The release date and cover were officially revealed by Tate via Twitter on June 18, 2019.

== Critical reception ==
Professional ratings
Review scores
Source	Rating
Pitchfork	6.8/10

Girls received a favorable review from Michelle Kim of Pitchfork. Kim gave the album a 6.8, she noted that on Girls, Tate "flexes all her modes, too, delivering silky R&B vocals, sassy bubblegum-popping bars, and pop-punky chants."

== Track listing ==
All tracks written and produced by Tate Farris.

Girls track listing
No.	Title	Length
1.	"New Girl"	5:12
2.	"That Girl"	4:30
3.	"Pretty Girl Remix" (featuring Killumantii and Latto)	3:24
4.	"Bad Girl"	3:30
5.	"Cozy Girl"	3:08
6.	"Wild Girl" (featuring BbyMutha)	3:13
7.	"Freaky Girl"	2:57
8.	"Play Girl"	3:54
9.	"Lover Girl" (featuring Baby Rose)	3:47
10.	"Flower Girl"	3:08
11.	"Hot Girl" (featuring Kari Faux)	2:42
Total length:		39:19

Deluxe edition bonus tracks
No.	Title	Length
12.	"Play Girl" (UNIIQU3 Remix)	3:56
13.	"Rich Girl"	2:48
14.	"Mean Girl" (featuring Queen Key and Asian Doll)	4:22
15.	"Girl"	1:04
Total length:		51:29

== Release history ==
Region	Date	Format(s)	Label	Ref.
Various	February 5, 2019	Streaming; digital download	Self-released	
Various	June 25, 2019	Streaming; digital download (Deluxe release)	Self-released	
