= Gardenia (album) =

Studio album by Monogem
- Released: September 2, 2021
- Genre: R&B; latin; pop; soul
- Length: 40:25
- Language: Spanish; English
- Label: MONOGEM (self-released)
- Producer: Kyle Patrick; Will Snyder

Monogem chronology
| So Many Ways (2019) | Gardenia (2021) |

Singles from Gardenia
- 1. "Paraíso" Released: May 29, 2020; 2. "Bésame Mucho" Released: November 20, 2020; 3. "Sólo Amor" Released: May 20, 2021; 4. "Dame La Fuerza" Released: July 15, 2021; 5. "Magia" Released: August 26, 2021

Gardenia is the debut studio album by Mexican-American singer and songwriter Monogem, which was released worldwide on September 2, 2021. The album was supported by five singles: Paraíso, Bésame Mucho, Sólo Amor, Dame La Fuerza, and Magia.

== Release and promotion ==
Monogem announced the album through her social medias, via Instagram and Twitter, alongside its art cover and title. In January 2022, Monogem announced a limited edition vinyl for the debut album through Qrates, a vinyl record pressing company. One of Monogem's songs, "Soy Lo Que Soy", was featured in Netflix's comedy drama series, Rebelde; season one, episode five. The single, "Paraíso", was also featured in HBO Max's comedy drama, Generation; season one, episode five.

=== Singles ===
"Paraíso" was released on May 29, 2020, as the first single from the album. Monogem did a cover of "Bésame Mucho", by Consuelo Velázquez, which was released as the second single on November 20, 2020. This single is considered to be an ode to Monogem's grandmother, Hortencia, which she always plays on repeat.

On May 20, 2021, a third single named, "Sólo Amor", was released with a lyric video. A fourth single named, "Dame La Fuerza", was released on July 15, 2020, joined with a music video.

"Magia", which was chosen to be the lead single for the debut album, was released on August 26, 2020, with a music video. Following the release of her lead single, Hirsh revealed in the music video that she was expecting her first child with Jason Melvin.

== Track listing ==
All tracks are written by Monogem, Kyle Patrick and Will Snyder.

Gardenia track listing
| No. | Title | Writer(s) | Length |
|---|---|---|---|
| 1. | "Hasta El Jardín (Intro)" | | 0:39 |
| 2. | "Soy Lo Que Soy" | Sarah Oreck | 3:49 |
| 3. | "Sin Palabras" | | 3:09 |
| 4. | "Sólo Amor" | | 3:09 |
| 5. | "Dame La Fuerza" | | 2:54 |
| 6. | "Paraíso" | | 3:52 |
| 7. | "Te Espero Aquí" | | 4:12 |
| 8. | "Gardenia (Interlude)" | | 2:10 |
| 9. | "Bésame Mucho" | Consuelo Velázquez | 4:36 |
| 10. | "Pasó Y Se Fue" | | 4:34 |
| 11. | "Tangerine Sky" | | 3:42 |
| 12. | "Magia" | | 3:20 |
| Total length: | | | 40:25 |

Notes

- Soy Lo Que Soy was added to the debut album from the third extended play: So Many Ways.

== Personnel ==
Credits adapted from the album's liner notes of Gardenia.

=== Musicians ===
- Monogem – vocals (all tracks)
- Adam Tressler – guitar (track 2)
- Adam Christgau – drums, percussion (track 2)
- Guillermo E. Brown – guitar (track 5)
- Hailey Niswanger – alto saxophone (track 10)

=== Production ===
- Kyle Patrick – producer (all tracks)
- Will Snyder – producer (all tracks)
- Joe LaPorta – mastering (all tracks)
- Jared Hirshland – co-mastering (tracks 6, 9)
- Tim Latham – mixing (tracks 1–9, 11, 12)
- Ryan Gilligan – mixing (track 8)

=== Artwork ===
- Nehal Joshi – design
- Jenna Johns – photography

== Release history ==
Release dates and formats for Gardenia
| Region | Date | Format(s) | Label | Ref. |
|---|---|---|---|---|
| Various | September 2, 2021 | streaming; digital download | MONOGEM | |
| Various | January 18, 2022 | vinyl | Qrates | |
