= Maliibu Miitch =

American rapper from North Carolina

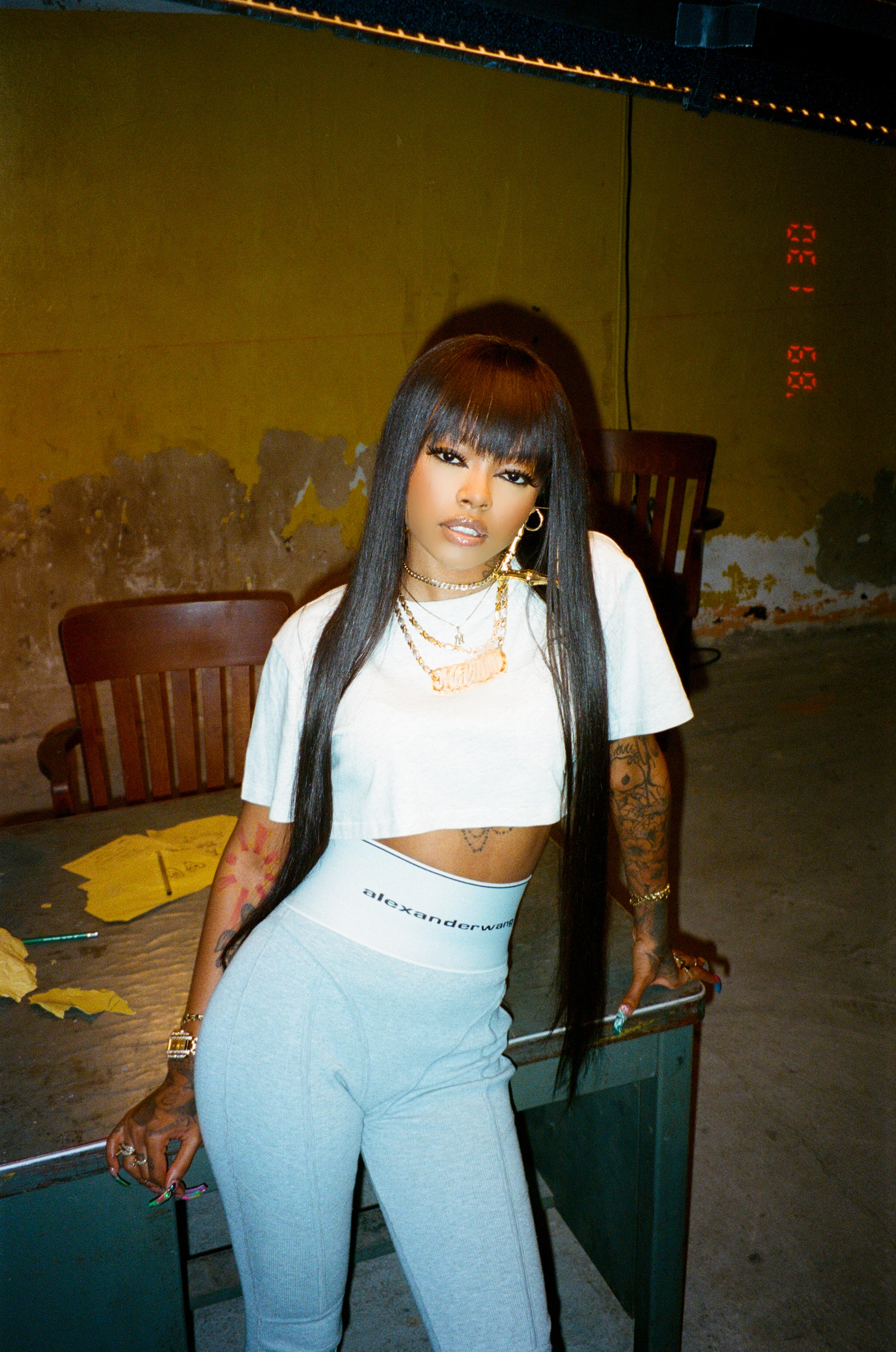
- Roberts in 2018

Background information
- Born: Jennifer Jade Roberts; March 4, 1991 (age 35); Charlotte, North Carolina, U.S.
- Origin: New York City, New York, U.S.
- Genres: Hip hop; gangsta rap
- Occupations: Rapper; singer; songwriter
- Instrument: Vocals
- Years active: 2009–present
- Labels: Atlantic, Island, Def Jam
- Formerly of: Malibu N Helene
- Website: maliibumiitchofficial.com

Jennifer Jade Roberts (born March 4, 1991), known professionally as Maliibu Miitch, is an American rapper, singer, and songwriter. Born in Charlotte, North Carolina and raised in New York City, Roberts started rapping in 2009. Prior to her solo career, she was a member of the hip hop duo Malibu N Helene.

In 2013, the duo released their debut EP titled, Hood Foreign and signed to Def Jam/Island Records a year later. In 2015, they released two singles: "Figure8" (produced by Mustard) and "Starin' at It" (produced by Dem Jointz). In 2017, she released a mixtape titled Maliibu Miitch Top 5. In 2018, Roberts pursued a solo career with the release of her debut single titled "Give Her Some Money" under Atlantic Records that was produced by Hitmaka.

== Early life ==
Maliibu's mother, Venessa White, was born in Charlotte, North Carolina and raised in New York City, New York. It was there that she met Maliibu's father, Brett Roberts, who was a Vietnamese adopted from Vietnam when he was a child. When Maliibu was 3 years old, her mother left Charlotte to move to New York City with her other two siblings.

Maliibu began modeling at 17 years old but quickly picked up rapping. In 2011 Maliibu made it into Jim Jones Hustle In the Morning music video which fueled her desire to rap even more.

== Career ==
In 2009, Maliibu Miitch picked up rapping, and started freestyling in ciphers around her neighborhood in the South Bronx. What started as a hobby for the then 18-year-old rapper ended up helping her land her first record deal in 2011 with Ruff Ryders CEO Darin "Dee" Dean. The deal was co-signed by producer Swizz Beatz.

In 2013, at the age of 21, Maliibu Miitch went independent and started her own label and all-female cooperation. Later that year, she released her debut extended play through Empire, titled Hood Foreign, after her company.

In 2014, Maliibu Miitch signed her second deal, which would become her first major label deal at Island Records. There, she teamed up with a female singer, releasing two singles in 2015: "Figure8," produced by DJ Mustard, and "Starin At It," produced by Dem Jointz. After taking a two-year break from music, Roberts returned in 2017 with her EP, "Top 5," and singles "Gwapamole" and "4 AM".

Within a couple of months, Maliibu Miitch once again landed another deal, this time with Atlantic Records. This was her second major recording deal, but her first-ever solo deal. She released the single, "Give Her Some Money," produced by Hitmaka in 2018. She is currently working with Entertainment One Music to release her debut album.

== Influences ==
Maliibu cites her mother, Lil' Kim, Lauryn Hill, Rihanna, 50 Cent, Jay-Z, Nicki Minaj, Foxy Brown and Jadakiss as her style and rap influences.

== Discography ==
Maliibu Miitch discography
- EPs: 1
- Singles: 13

=== Extended plays ===
Title	Details	Ref.
Hood Foreign	Released: September 3, 2013; Label: Hood Foreign; Format: streaming & digital download	

=== Singles ===
Title	Year	Album
"Ko8e"	2016	Non-album singles
"Hello"	2016	Non-album singles
"4 AM"	2017	Non-album singles
"Gwapamole"	2017	Non-album singles
"The Count"	2017	Non-album singles
"Give Her Some Money"	2018	Non-album singles
"Bum Bitch"	2018	Non-album singles
"Celine"	2019	Non-album singles
"Double O"	2020	Non-album singles
"Let's Be Honest"	2020	Non-album singles
"Gucci" (with Bree Runway)	2020	2000and4Eva
"I Like What I Like"	2021	Non-album singles
"Dangerous" (with THEMXXNLIGHT)	2022	Non-album singles

=== As a featured artist ===
Title	Year	Album	Ref.
"Bank" Qveen Herby (featuring Monogem & Maliibu Miitch)	2017	EP 2	
"XXXTC" Brooke Candy (featuring Charli XCX & Maliibu Miitch)	2019	Sexorcism	
"Poppin" On The Hunt (featuring Maliibu Miitch)	2020	Non-album singles	
"Like That" Adrian Gamboa (featuring Maliibu Miitch)	2022	Non-album singles	
"Bow Your Head" Cult of Y (featuring Maliibu Miitch)	2023	W.I.P.	
"T'd Up" 22Gz (featuring Maliibu Miitch)	2024	Growth & Development II DELUXE	
