= 2000and4Eva =

Mixtape by Bree Runway
- Released: 6 November 2020
- Recorded: Winter 2019–early 2020
- Genre: Hip-hop; trap; pop
- Length: 21:45
- Label: EMI; UMG
- Producer: Johannes Klahr; Liohn; Moon Willis; Raf Riley; Easyfun; Fat Max Gsus; Kilian & Jo

Bree Runway chronology
Be Runway (2019)	2000and4Eva (2020)	Woah, What a Blur! (2022)

Singles from 2000and4Eva
- 1. "Apeshit" Released: 5 March 2020; 2. "Damn Daniel" Released: 30 April 2020; 3. "Gucci" Released: 23 July 2020; 4. "Little Nokia" Released: 23 September 2020; 5. "ATM" Released: 5 November 2020

2000and4Eva (stylised in all caps) is the debut mixtape by British rapper and singer-songwriter Bree Runway. It was released on 6 November 2020 via EMI Records and UMG, and was supported by the singles "Apeshit", "Damn Daniel", "Gucci", "Little Nokia" and "ATM". 2000and4Eva features guest appearances from Missy Elliott, Yung Baby Tate, Maliibu Miitch and Rico Nasty, as well as production from musicians such as EasyFun and Raf Riley, among others. The mixtape expands upon the electronic infused hip-hop and trap-pop sound of its predecessor Be Runway (2019) while expanding into different genres such as rock, reggae, and dance.

== Background ==
Initially referred to as an EP, Runway would disclose in an interview with DIY Magazine in July 2020 that the EP would delve into "unlocking more of herself". When reflecting on the project, Runway states; "I've had to face myself head on during lockdown. A lot of those sad times and moments I’m scared of will pop up here." Runway expressed her challenges with the COVID-19 pandemic, having to cancel a video shoot for "Damn Daniel" and later creating "quarantine" music videos for the song as well as the next single "Gucci". Plans for a headlining tour would also be cancelled due to the pandemic. Despite this, sessions for the project would be recorded in isolation at Runway's house.

2000and4Eva was first teased on 27 October 2020, where Runway posted a teaser video on her social media accounts, revealing the title of the mixtape. The official cover art and track list were revealed a day later, with the omitting of the feature for the song "ATM". The feature would later be revealed as American musician Missy Elliott.

== Composition ==
Musically, 2000and4Eva is primarily a hip-hop and trap-pop mixtape that features elements of rock, reggae, dance, as well as music critics from NPR describing the record as "destructive pop-rap".

The opening track and first single, "Apeshit", has been described as "dynamic in its clean and precise ability to conjoin two different sounds" and "ultimately bungee[ing] between climatic build-ups and dancefloor breakdowns". The chorus of the song has been described as "calm, with synthy piano strokes and blaring guitar strums" while the verses of the songs "shift into a high energy vogue-style dance beat". The second track, "Little Nokia", has been described as a "predominantly rock song with elements of a sci-fi film's soundtrack" and "embellished with roaring guitars that play as a seamless contrast against Bree's slick vocals and seeping harmonies". The third track "ATM", featuring Missy Elliott, is described as an "energetic and bass-heavy collaboration full of confidence and memorable one-liners." "Damn Daniel", a collaboration with Yung Baby Tate, has been described as "90's black-girl pop" with "modern day rap". Lyrically, "Damn Daniel" consists of a back and forth of Runway and Tate rapping from the perspective of "nostalgic sitcom alter egos". The fifth track, "Rolls Royce" is described as "reggae-infused" and Maliibu Miitch collaboration, "Gucci" is a "powerful yet playful anthem that's celebratory with plenty of cheek." "4 Nicole Thea & Baby Reign" is described as "sombre" and where "hurting and healing find its way to the work". Lyrically, the song is a tribute to late YouTube star Nicole Thea and her unborn child, with Runway promising to see them in the afterlife. The eighth track, "No Sir (Freestyle)" is "halfway between a rap and rock track".

== Release and promotion ==
The lead single, "Apeshit", was released on 5 March 2020 and drew immediate comparisons to Missy Elliott, who would later co-sign the track on Twitter.

The second single, "Damn Daniel", a collaboration with American singer and rapper Yung Baby Tate, was released on 30 April 2020 alongside a music video. The song first premiered on DJ Annie Mac's Future Sounds show on BBC Radio 1 as the "Hottest Record in the World".

On 19 July 2020, Bree Runway announced the release of the third single, "Gucci" with American rapper Maliibu Miitch. The single was revealed alongside its cover art by having fans enter the song's title into her website as a password. The song was released on 23 July 2020.

"Little Nokia" was released as the mixtape's fourth single on 23 September 2020, alongside a music video.

"ATM" featuring American rapper Missy Elliott was released as the record's fifth and final single on 5 November 2020, a day before its official release. Runway would perform "ATM" alongside album track "Rolls Royce" for Vevo's DSCVR series on 9 November 2020. A music video for "ATM" was released on 11 January 2021. A solo version subtitled the "Breemix" was released on 25 January 2021, alongside a live performance video.

== Critical reception ==
Professional ratings
Review scores
Source	Rating
Clash	8/10
DIY	4/5 stars
NME	4/5 stars
Tom Hull – on the Web	B+

Timi Sotire of NME described the mixtape as a "bold, belligerent yet vulnerable debut from a versatile pop star-in-waiting", while also noting that it "forcefully challenges the white supremacy that has historically underpinned the music industry's manufacturing of the 'popstar'." Aaron Williams of Uproxx noted that Runway's "electro-influenced blend of hip-hop and pop is a sure mood booster for these troubled times," referring to the COVID-19 pandemic. Elle Evans of Clash described the mixtape as a "fiery and undaunted statement" and wrote that by "creating a bold, dynamic and cohesive body of work, [2000and4Eva] only solidifies Bree Runway's rise to fame." Time magazine would later name "Little Nokia" the fourth best song of 2020.

== Track listing ==
Credits adapted from Tidal.

2000and4Eva track listing
No.	Title	Lyrics	Music	Producer(s)	Length
1.	"Apeshit"	Brenda Mensah	Richard "Liohn" Zastenker; Johannes Klahr; Levi Gordon; Moon Willis; Rafael Greifer	Liohn; Klahr; Willis; Raf Riley	2:40
2.	"Little Nokia"	Mensah; Cleo Tighe	Finn Keane	Easyfun	2:19
3.	"ATM" (featuring Missy Elliott)	Mensah; Melissa Elliott	Zastenker; Klahr; Fat Max Gsus	Liohn; Klahr; Fat Max Gsus	3:08
4.	"Damn Daniel" (with Yung Baby Tate)	Mensah; Tate Farris	Zastenker; Klahr	Liohn; Klahr	2:53
5.	"Rolls Royce"	Mensah	Willis	Willis	2:18
6.	"Gucci" (with Maliibu Miitch)	Mensah; Maliibu Miitch	Willis; Cleveland Bell; Ricky Taylor; Victor May	Willis	3:01
7.	"4 Nicole Thea & Baby Reign"	Mensah	Willis	Willis	1:16
8.	"No Sir" (Freestyle)	Mensah	Johannes Burger; Kilian Wilke	Kilian & Jo	1:33

Bonus track
No.	Title	Lyrics	Music	Producer(s)	Length
9.	"Little Nokia" (remix featuring Rico Nasty)	Mensah; Tighe; Maria Kelly	Keane; Malik Foxx	Easyfun	2:36
Total length:					21:45

== Release history ==
Region	Date	Format	Label	Ref.
Various	6 November 2020	Digital download; streaming	EMI	
