= Scott Michael Smith =

Scott Michael Smith (born June 28, 1984) is an Emmy and two time Grammy Award-winning audio engineer, record producer, and multi-instrumentalist based in Los Angeles, California. Smith has worked with John Mayer, Fink, Colbie Caillat, Katy Perry, Monogem, Carole King, and Weezer amongst many others. Smith has worked extensively in film and television music as well. Some of Smith's score work includes The Handmaid's Tale, It Chapter 2, The Invisible Man, Mank and the Academy Award-winning film The Revenant.

Smith was born in West Hills, California and grew up in Agoura Hills, California. He's a graduate of Berklee College of Music in Boston. Upon moving back to Los Angeles, Smith was hired as an engineer at the Village Recorder Studios. Here he worked with artists such as Smokey Robinson, Jose Gonzales, The Secret Sisters, Keith Emerson, Grizzly Bear, The Dandy Warhols, Nas, Rodrigo y Gabriella, Melody Gardot, and Steve Earle. Smith has also joined with the electro-pop artist, Monogem, but later on left.
