= Gardena =

Gardena may refer to one of the following

== Places ==
- Gardena, California, a city
- Gardena, North Dakota, a city
- Gardena, Idaho, an unincorporated community
- Gardena Pass, a high mountain pass in South Tyrol, Italy
- Val Gardena, a valley in the Dolomites of northern Italy, best known as a skiing area.

== Other uses ==
- Gardena (company), a German manufacturer of gardening tools
- Gardena (bug) a genus of thread-legged bug
- HC Gardena, the Italian name of the ice hockey team HC Gherdëina

== See also ==
- Gardenia (disambiguation)
