= Bree Runway =

British singer and rapper (born 1992)

- Born: Brenda Wireko Mensah; 18 November 1992 (age 33); Hackney, London, England
- Genres: Pop; hyperpop; hip hop; R&B
- Occupations: Singer; songwriter; rapper
- Years active: 2015–present
- Labels: EMI Records (former); Free Runway Records (current)
- Website: breerunwaymusic.com

Brenda Wireko Mensah (born 18 November 1992), known professionally as Bree Runway, is a British singer and rapper. She signed to EMI Records (former) in 2018 and subsequently released her first commercial EP Be Runway (2019), followed by her debut mixtape, 2000and4Eva (2020), which spawned the single "ATM" featuring Missy Elliott. Runway won the award for Best New International Act at the 2021 BET Awards, and was nominated for the 2022 Brit Award for Rising Star.

== Early life ==
Mensah was born on 18 November 1992 in Hackney, where she was raised. She is of Ghanaian descent. She resided on a street given the nickname "Murder mile" due to high rates of crime and conflict. Runway views her upbringing and experiences as her having to have "thick skin", resilience and "having instilled a fight in me" which she is thankful for. At the age of 9, Runway experienced bullying and colourism which caused her to bleach her skin and have a negative chemical reaction to the product. Runway credits those moments as shaping her both as a person and an artist. Runway discussed the positive shift in attitude regarding her skin when she went to a college in South London where she met model Leomie Anderson who encouraged Runway to take pictures of herself and "take charge of our situations".

In an interview, she disclosed that she was only interested in music at school but never thought of herself as a musician. She enrolled in a Music technology subject which taught her the basics of music production. As a result, Runway started making beats and freestyling with her friends. Runway discussed that she purchased a "DIY home studio" setup with her first pay cheque which was where she was singing over self-produced beats and writing her own songs. Earlier material such as RNWY 01 was recorded with her DIY setup and explained that the self-sufficiency taught her what musical sound she wanted to pursue. Runway revealed that Former First Lady of the United States, Michelle Obama, once visited her school where she performed for her and was told to keep pursuing a musical career and that she wanted to see her performing at the White House to which Runway responded "Invite me then!".

== Career ==
=== 2015–2019: Career beginnings and Be Runway ===
Bree Runway made her solo debut with the self-released EPs titled RNWY 01 and Bouji being released in November 2015 and May 2016 respectively. Runway commercially released her debut single "Butterfly" in November 2016. A music video was released alongside the song, which was shot in Dubai, by model Leomie Anderson and directed by Runway herself.

On 21 September 2017, Bree Runway released "What Do I Tell My Friends?" which debuted alongside a music video. The video would gather major attention, being her first to pass over one hundred thousand views, and praise due to its serious message of exploitation of young females in the fashion industry. Bree Runway was featured on British electronic duo Metroplane's single "Word of Mouth" which was released in February 2018.

Bree Runway signed to Virgin EMI Records in 2018. In May 2019, she released the single "2ON" as her major-label debut. The track would later be included on Paper's critics list of the Top 50 Songs of 2019. Car company Toyota would also use the track in an advertisement for their C-HR Leave Ordinary Behind campaign. In July 2019, the single "Big Racks" featuring Brooke Candy was released. Bree Runway released her major-label debut EP Be Runway on 16 August 2019 which was preceded by singles "2ON" and "Big Racks" featuring Brooke Candy. A video for the track "All Night" was released five days later, making it the third and final single from the EP.

=== 2020–2022: 2000and4Eva and Woah, What a Blur! ===
On 5 March 2020, Bree Runway released the single "Apeshit" which was met with critical acclaim and drew immediate comparisons to Missy Elliott who would later co-sign the track on Twitter. A censored version of the song titled, "Ain't It", was included on the FIFA 21 VOLTA Football soundtrack. During April 2020, Bree Runway was featured on the cover of Issue 87 of British magazine Notion. On 28 April 2020, Runway announced that her next single would be titled "Damn Daniel" and would be a collaboration with American singer and rapper Baby Tate. The single was released on 30 April, alongside a "quarantine edition" music video. The song was featured on Annie Mac's Future Sounds show on BBC Radio 1 as the "Hottest Record in the World" on 30 April.

On 10 July 2020, Bree Runway was featured on a remix of Rina Sawayama’s single "XS". In July 2020, Bree Runway released the single "Gucci" with American rapper Maliibu Miitch. She also released the single "Little Nokia" in September 2020, which would later go onto be ranked the fourth best song of 2020 by Time. In October 2020, Bree Runway was the cover star for the DIY issue of British magazine Hunger. In October 2020, Runway announced the release of her debut mixtape, 2000and4Eva, which was released on 6 November 2020 via Virgin EMI Records. The mixtape's release was preceded and supported by the singles; "Apeshit", "Damn Daniel", "Gucci", "Little Nokia" and "ATM". A music video for the mixtape's fifth single, "ATM" featuring Missy Elliott, was released on 11 January 2021. A solo version of the song, subtitled the "Breemix", was released on 25 January 2021.

On 28 March 2021, Bree Runway announced the release of the single, "Hot Hot", which was released on 31 March 2021. On 20 May 2021, "Space Ghost Coast to Coast", a collaboration with English band Glass Animals was released. In the beginning of September 2021, she was featured on the Jimmy Edgar remix of "Babylon" by Lady Gaga off her remix album Dawn of Chromatica, as well as in the music video for "Have Mercy" by Chlöe. In December 2021, Runway made her debut award show performance at the 2021 MOBO Awards, where she performed "Hot Hot" and teased a new single "Pressure". "Pressure" was released on 7 February 2022. The following month, "Somebody Like You" was released, which served as the second of three releases. On 27 September 2022, Runway announced the release of the single "That Girl", which was released on 29 September. The song served as the lead single from her fourth EP, Woah, What a Blur!, which was released on 8 December 2022.

=== 2023–present: Split from EMI and "Free Runway" ===
In February 2023, Runway was the main support act for Lizzo's The Special Tour during select European dates. She released the single "Be the One" with Khalid in April. By July, Runway announced she had parted ways with EMI & Universal and that she would continue to release music as an independent artist.

June 2024 saw the release of "Just Like That", Runway's first single as an independent artist. She opened up about her experience being signed the aforementioned labels in an interview with Vogue.

== Artistry ==
I always feel the need to correct people anytime they call me an R&B sensation. I’ve said it before, and I’ll repeat it. I’m not R&B. I need to keep reinforcing this because the world is so obsessed with labelling people and putting them in boxes that sometimes people lose who they are, and then they start obsessing and put themselves in a box. Then people don’t feel comfortable stepping out and being who they are because this is what they are being told is how they should be, and it’s so wrong.

— Bree Runway on genre categorization

Bree Runway has expressed her sound as "genre-bending" as well as "genre fluid" with her material experimenting with a multitude of genres including; pop, trap, dance, R&B, rock, and hyperpop. Despite being signed to a major label, Runway revealed that she is entirely in charge of her creative process. Runway explains that she tries to study genres that she doesn't listen to on a daily basis quoting that there is "inspiration everywhere". When discussing Runway's sound, she emphasizes her disapproval with genre labelling, rejecting the labels of a rapper or an "R&B sensation" and claiming that―if she weren't Black―she wouldn't be labelled as such, while insisting on being dubbed a "popstar".

She cites Foxy Brown, Lil' Kim, Britney Spears, Madonna, Missy Elliott, Pharrell, Kelis and the Neptunes as her biggest influences.

== Discography ==
Mixtapes

- 2000and4Eva (2020)

== Awards and nominations ==
Award	Year	Category	Nominee(s)	Result	Ref.
BBC	2020	Sound of 2021	Herself	Nominated	
BET Awards	2021	Best New International Act	Herself	Won	
Brit Awards	2022	Rising Star	Herself	Nominated	
MOBO Awards	2020	Video of the Year	"Apeshit"	Nominated	
MOBO Awards	2021	Video of the Year	"Hot Hot"	Nominated	
MOBO Awards	2021	Best Female Act	Herself	Nominated	
Music Video Festival	2021	Revelation in Direction	"ATM" (with Missy Elliott)	Nominated	
NME Awards	2022	Best New Act in the World	Herself	Nominated	
NME Awards	2022	Best New Act from the UK	Herself	Nominated	
Popjustice £20 Music Prize	2018	Best British Pop Single	"Word of Mouth" (with Alex Metric)	Nominated	
Popjustice £20 Music Prize	2020	Best British Pop Single	"Damn Daniel" (with Yung Baby Tate)	Nominated	
Popjustice £20 Music Prize	2021	Best British Pop Single	"Hot Hot"	Nominated	
Rated Awards	2021	Female Artist of the Year	Herself	Nominated	
UK Music Video Awards	2021	Best Hip Hop/Grime/Rap Video - UK	"ATM" (with Missy Elliott)	Nominated	

== Tours ==
Supporting

- Lizzo – The Special Tour (2023)
