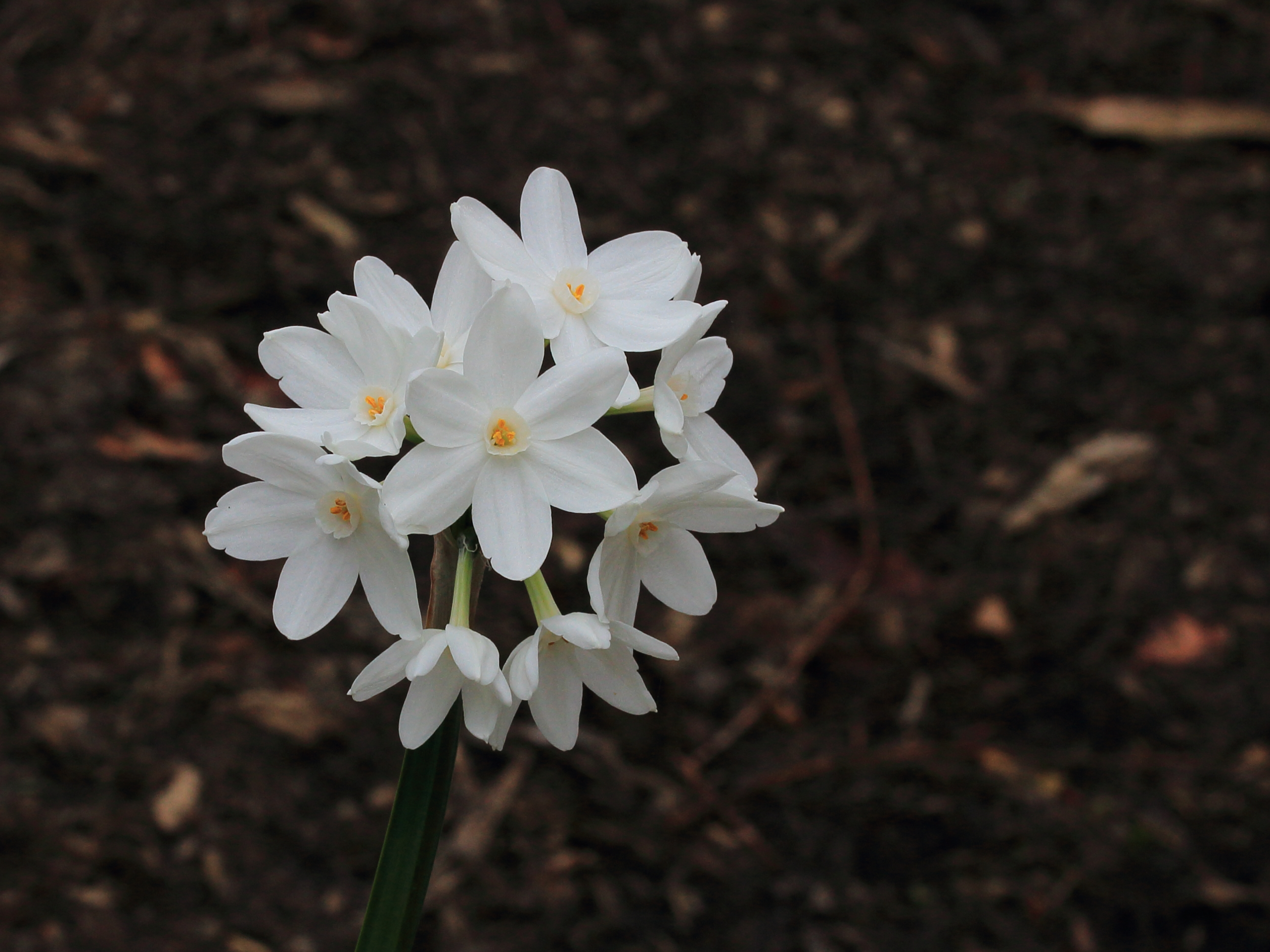
- Paperwhite, Narcissus papyraceus

Scientific classification
- Kingdom: Plantae
- Clade: Tracheophytes
- Clade: Angiosperms
- Clade: Monocots
- Order: Asparagales
- Family: Amaryllidaceae
- Subfamily: Amaryllidoideae
- Genus: Narcissus
- Species: N. papyraceus

Binomial name
- Narcissus papyraceus Ker-Gawl.
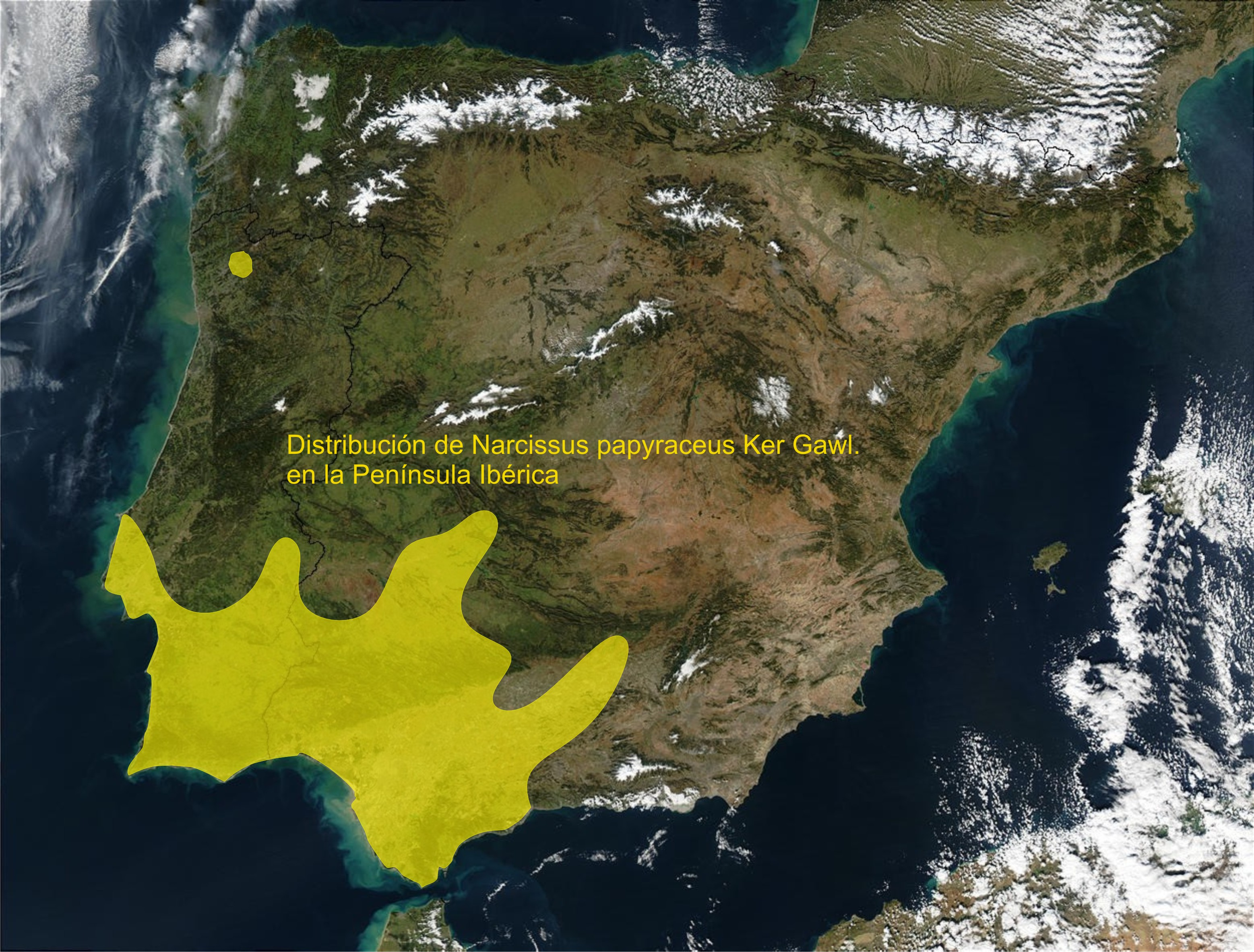
- Distribution in Spain and Portugal

= Narcissus papyraceus =

Paperwhite

Species of daffodil

Narcissus papyraceus (from papyrus and aceus; meaning paper-like), one of a few species known as paperwhite, is a perennial bulbous plant native to the Mediterranean region, from Greece to Portugal plus Morocco and Algeria. The species is considered naturalized in the Azores, Corsica, Texas, California and Louisiana. The white flowers are borne in bunches and are strongly fragrant. It is frequently grown as a house plant, often forced to flower at Christmas.

Paperwhites are part of the genus Narcissus which includes plants known as daffodils.

== Description ==
The stems are mid-green and grow upright. Mature height is usually 1–1.5 ft (30–45 cm), though this varies by variety. Several white flowers are borne at the top of each stem and are strongly scented.

== Cultivation ==
Many cultivars are available and are easy to force into bloom indoors. Unlike other Narcissus species, paperwhites do not require chilling to promote bloom. The bulbs begin to grow as soon as they are planted, with flowers appearing in 3–4 weeks.

Narcissus papyraceus thrives in moist, peat moss based potting mix. Plants can also be grown in containers of water. Cool temperatures between 50–65 °F (10–18 °C) and indirect light will help to prolong the bloom time.

== Gallery ==
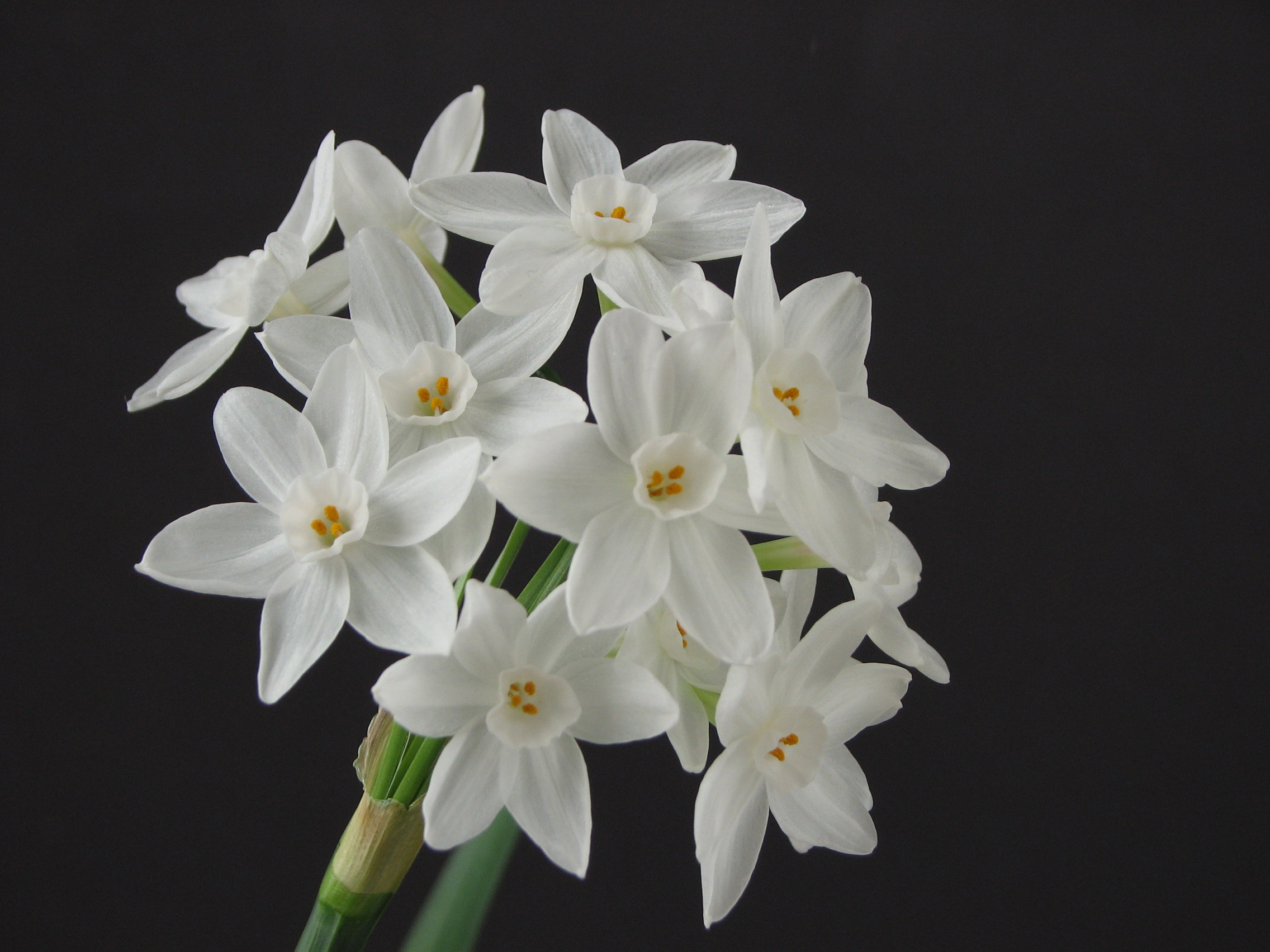
Narcissus papyraceus 'Paperwhite'

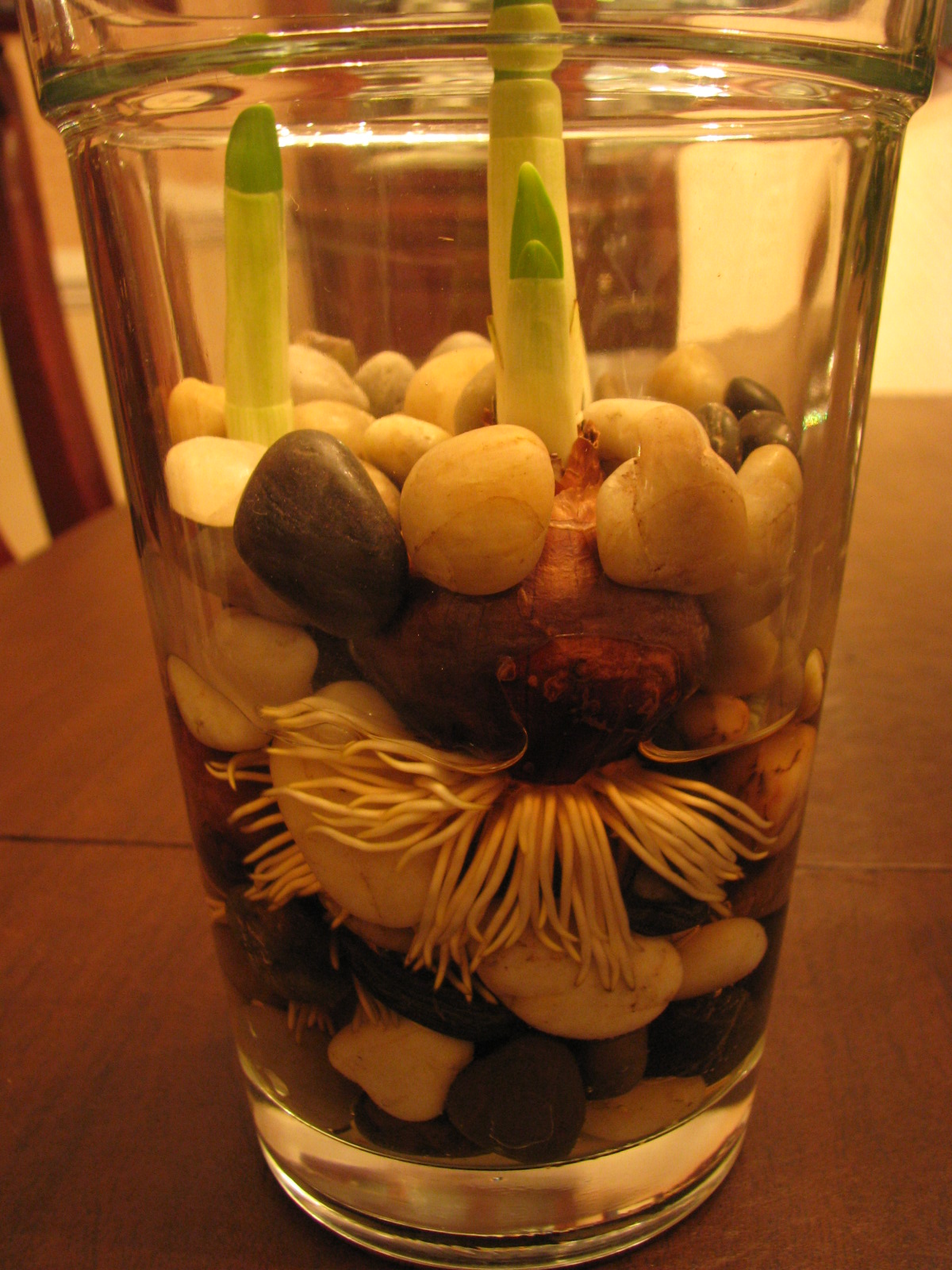
Paperwhite bulbs being induced to bloom indoors.
