= Baby Tate (rapper) =

American rapper and singer (born 1996)

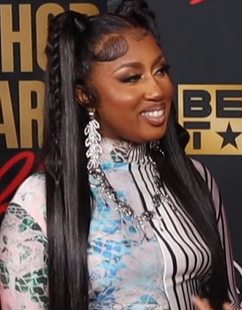
- Baby Tate at the 2022 BET Hip Hop Awards

Background information
- Also known as: Yung Baby Tate
- Born: Tate Sequoya Farris; May 13, 1996 (age 30); Atlanta, Georgia, U.S.
- Genres: Hip-hop; R&B; pop
- Occupations: Rapper; singer; songwriter; record producer
- Works: Discography
- Years active: 2015–present
- Labels: Warner; Raedio
- Parents: David Ryan Harris (father); Dionne Farris (mother)
- Website: babytate.com

Tate Sequoya Farris (born May 13, 1996), known professionally as Baby Tate (formerly known as Yung Baby Tate), is an American rapper, singer, songwriter, and record producer. The daughter of singer Dionne Farris, she released her debut project, ROYGBIV, in 2015. She has since garnered significant attention for the successful viral single "I Am" featuring Flo Milli and the EP After the Rain, among others. Her song "Beckham" was featured in the pilot episode of Euphoria in 2019. In 2021, she signed a record deal with Warner Records and released her major label debut single, "Pedi", on October 29, 2021. She dropped her EP Baby Tate Presents: Sexploration the Musical on October 27, 2023.

== Early life ==
Tate Sequoya Farris was born in 1996 in Decatur, Georgia, to singers Dionne Farris and David Ryan Harris. She had no contact with her father while growing up, but her mother supported her musical ambitions. She started dancing and playing piano at an early age, and began producing her own beats by age 13.

== Career ==
Under the name Yung Baby Tate, she released the EP ROYGBIV in November 2015 and the Christmas-themed EP YBTXMAS in December 2016. In early 2019, she released a short film produced in conjunction with her upcoming album. Her debut full-length album Girls was released in February 2019 to positive reviews. XXL named the album as one of the best hip-hop projects of 2019.

In July 2019, Yung Baby Tate released a cover of Nicki Minaj's "Megatron". In 2020, she announced that she had signed a recording contract with Issa Rae's record label Raedio and released two singles from the soundtrack of the television series Insecure. On April 30, 2020, the single "Damn Daniel" was released in collaboration with British rapper Bree Runway. On December 4, 2020, she released her sixth EP, After the Rain which included the singles "Rainbow Cadillac" and "I Am" featuring Flo Milli. A deluxe edition was released on May 21, 2021, and was preceded by the single "Eenie Meenie".

The recording artist simplified her stage name to Baby Tate in late 2021. In July 2021, Tate joined the tenth season of the VH1 reality television series, Love & Hip Hop: Atlanta. In 2022, Baby Tate toured as an opening act with Charli XCX on the North American leg of Crash: The Live Tour.

In September 2024, Yung Baby Tate was featured as a collaborating artist on Prof's single 'Butter' alongside electronic band Ghost Town. The music video premiered on YouTube on October 4, 2024 and has garnered 927K views.

== Influences ==
She lists Nicki Minaj, Migos, Future, Gucci Mane, CeCe Peniston, her mother Dionne Farris, and RuPaul's Drag Race as influences.

== Personal life ==
Baby Tate identifies as pansexual.

== Discography ==
- Girls (2019)
