= Dream House (Empress Of album) =

Studio album by Empress Of
- Released: September 18, 2026
- Recorded: 2025–2026
- Studio: Bell Choir Studios (Los Angeles)
- Genres: electronic, alternative, dream pop, synth pop, trip-hop, baroque pop
- Length: 29:05
- Labels: Giant Music; Major Arcana
- Producers: Empress Of; Cecile Believe; Dave Sitek; Leclair; Nick León; Romil Hemnani; Matt Cohn; Finn Wigan

Empress Of chronology
| For Your Consideration (2024) | Dream House (2026) |

Singles from Dream House
- 1. "Dream House" Released: Mar 27, 2026; 2. "Wild Storm" Released: June 26, 2026; 3. "SYW" Released: August 7, 2026; 4. "HandsOn" Released: August 28, 2026; 5. "Blue Light" Released: September 17, 2026

Dream House is the fifth studio album by Honduran-American musical artist Empress Of, released September 18, 2026 via American independent label, Giant Music and her subsidiary imprint, Major Arcana jointly.

Dream House was preceded by the promotional release of its title track on March 27, 2026, followed by four remaining singles; "Wild Storm" on June 26, while "SYW" featuring Canadian musical artist, Cecile Believe and "HandsOn" were released within the month of August 2026 respectively. The album features additional guest appearances by Rodriguez's mother, Reyna Dubon and British musician and producer, Blood Orange on the album's fifth single, "Blue Light" released September 17, 2026.

== Background ==
Dream House primarily centers around Rodriguez's personal struggles and experiences following the loss of her childhood family home in Altadena, California, which had served as the residence of her mother Reyna, along with other immediate family for over three decades. The property was destroyed during the Eaton Fire, one of the major fires of the 2025 Southern California wildfires, which devastated several communities throughout the Greater Los Angeles area and San Diego County. The wildfires resulted in thirty-one fatalities and the displacement of over 200,000 residents across the state; the latter including Reyna and her immediate family.

Following the wildfires, Rodriguez temporarily stepped away from music professionally to prioritize supporting her family and assist surrounding communities affected by the disaster. During this period, she actively participated in local relief efforts and volunteered alongside community organizations, supporting displaced residents around Altadena.

In the midst of this difficult period, a community-driven GoFundMe campaign organized by her close friends and fellow musicians, Juliana Ronderos and Martha Brown (known professionally as Banoffee) successfully raised funds that exceeded its set goal in order to help Rodriguez's family recover from the loss of their home and secure the finances to put toward rebuilding on the same plot of land. The lived experiences of collective survival, displacement and rebuilding would ultimately influence and become the central focus and overall concept of the album.

== Composition and release ==
Professional ratings
Review scores
| Source | Rating |
|---|---|
| Le Devoir | 3.5/5 stars |
| Dork | 4/5 stars |
| The Guardian | 4/5 stars |
| Pitchfork | 6.4/10 |
| PopMatters | 5/10 |
| Stereoboard | 3/5 stars |

Several months after the wildfires, once Rodriguez felt comfortable enough to ease back into songwriting, she quickly discovered that processing her family's hardships artistically was more difficult than expected, but ultimately necessary in order to move past the experience. Her earliest efforts produced discarded material she deemed emotionally too raw and overwhelming to move forward with, as it largely reflected the sadness she felt in the immediate aftermath. After allowing herself the space to properly grieve, Rodriguez would gradually embrace a more optimistic perspective, choosing to look towards the future than dwell on the past as the thematic direction she wanted to pursue.

The album's initial concept would begin to take shape following a piano-and-vocal led idea Rodriguez recorded on her phone while on a retreat in Norway shortly after the natural disaster—expressing the desire to "build a dream" for her mother. This idea of creating a new beginning would later evolve into the album's title track and expand throughout the project, ultimately establishing the central theme of Dream House. While the voice memo served as the initial spark for the project, Rodriguez would credit working with songwriter and producer Mike Sabath, who encouraged her to write candidly about her experiences, despite her reservations following earlier attempts. "I owe Mike so much because he really opened my heart to being able to write more music after that experience," she recounted in an interview with writer Sydney Gore's Substack column, Nobody's Home.

Soon after, she began assembling a group of songwriters and producers based in Los Angeles, whom she trusted enough to provide a safe space for her to be vulnerable creatively, while detailing her experiences on record. Among her closest collaborator was singer-songwriter-producer and PC Music associate Cecile Believe, who served as the album's main co-writer, contributing to the lion's share of its tracks. Other principal collaborators included former BROCKHAMPTON member Romil Hemnani, Canadian electronic producer and singer Jessy Lanza; emerging songwriter Leclair, known for his work with Diplo, BTS, Jennie and Hemnani's former bandmate, Kevin Abstract and multi-platinum engineer and producer Matt Cohn, whose credits include the likes of The Weeknd, SZA, Charli XCX, Phoebe Bridgers and Soccer Mommy, as well as the soundtrack for 2019 film Uncut Gems. The group also included previous collaborators Nick León and Nate Campany, who both worked on her 2024 album For Your Consideration.

Additional contributions also came from burgeoning Florida R&B artist Q Marsden, as well as established musicians Stella Mozgawa and Dave Sitek, members of the indie rock bands Warpaint and TV on the Radio respectively. Rodriguez's longtime friend and musical peer, Dev Hynes also contributed to the project remotely from New York.

While Rodriguez would begin the writing and recording for Dream House in the middle of 2025, Reyna would also begin taking on the responsibilities of the reconstruction of her house in Altadena, securing permits and materials as the project's contractor, inspiring her daughter even further to craft music based around their shared experience.

In May 2025, Rodriguez was announced as one of the opening support acts for the North American leg of the Ultrasound World Tour, an international arena tour led by New Zealand singer Lorde, in promotion her fourth studio album Virgin, with Rodriguez's involvement alongside English singer-songwriter The Japanese House successfully embarked on throughout the fall of 2025. A week prior to her first appearance on the tour, Rodriguez would release her collaboration with Sabath—a personal ode to music itself called, "Blasting Through the Speakers" on October 2, 2025 as a standalone single. Following the tour, Rodriguez would continue to write and record new material once back home in Los Angeles, all the way into the new year.

In 2026, following several months of recording and pre-production, Rodriguez would share the album's title track, "Dream House" as a single on March 27, 2026. Having accumulated enough material over the past year, she had originally intended to release the project as an EP around this time. However, as the reconstruction of her family's home progressed, she found renewed inspiration in witnessing the rebuilding process, prompting her to reconsider the EP's direction and move beyond the devastation that had initially shaped it.

Rodriguez's change of heart was also informed by feedback from close friends and colleagues, with whom she privately shared the unreleased material. While many responded positively to the songs, some felt most of the material leaned too heavily into a sombre, dour tone and questioned the collection's lack of eccentricity and more upbeat elements characterized in her earlier work. Others raised concerns about its cohesion and how effectively the songs conveyed the project's overarching concept when heard out of sequence, with one undisclosed peer remarking that they "lacked a story". After carefully considering the feedback given, Rodriguez decided to expand the material into a full-length album rather than proceed with the EP. In the process, initial single, "Blasting Through the Speakers" would be abandoned and left off of the project, along with all of the associated visual material photographed for the EP before construction began, as she felt it placed too much emphasis on the immediate devastation and no longer reflected the more hopeful shift in direction the project had since taken.

The decision was significant enough that she would cancel a UK and European tour scheduled for that spring, which included a pair of high profile appearances in London and Dublin respectively; performing at LGBTQ+ music festival Mighty Hoopla and opening for American pop singer Addison Rae at Irish Museum of Modern Art in order to complete the album. The expanded format allowed Rodriguez to develop a more substantial narrative, weaving her mother's experiences into a broader, multi-generational account of the rebuilding process. This perspective was further developed through continued songwriting and the addition of brief reprises and interludes, including spoken-word passages recorded by Reyna.

Once the record was fully completed, Dream House was officially announced as Rodriguez's fifth studio album through the release of the project's second and lead single, "Wild Storm" on June 26, 2026. The single was accompanied by a music video directed by filmmaker Mitch deQuilettes. Shot on location in Altadena, the video features aerial footage of Rodriguez performing the song on the roof of her nearly completed home, backdropped against the surrounding neighbourhood, offering an intimate and up-close look at the aftermath of the disaster and the community's resilience through their collective rebuilding efforts.

A few months following the album's announcement, Rodriguez continued its rollout with the third single, “SYW” featuring Cecile Believe released August 7, 2026, accompanied by its music video shot on location in Mexico City, directed by Magaly Ugarte de Pablo. The fourth single, "HandsOn" followed a few weeks later on August 28, while its official video would arrive the following week on September 4th, 2026. "Blue Light" featuring Blood Orange was subsequently released on September 17, 2026 one day before the album's arrival, serving as its fifth and final promotional single.

To mark the album's arrival, she performed a special release show on September 30, 2026 at Music Hall of Williamsburg in Brooklyn, New York. The famed venue held particular significance for Rodriguez, having previously hosted the release celebration of her debut album Me in 2015, highlighting an important location and achievement in her career. Additionally, The show also carried a bittersweet significance, taking place as the venue approached its impending closure and demolition following redevelopment plans and the non-renewal of its lease after nearly 20 years of operation.

== Critical reception ==
Upon its release, Dream House was generally well received by critics and fans alike, with many praising Rodriguez's ability to frame her personal tragedy through such a positive and uplifting lens. Writing for The Guardian, Laura Snapes would highlight this contrast, describing the album as "amazingly airy, free and open-hearted" despite the "violent loss behind the record". She further notes the shift in tone from Rodriguez's previous album, stating that the direct approach of For Your Consideration, "softens" on this project "to a humid atmosphere that’s bright with hope".

Felicity Newton of Dork magazine also offered a glowing review summarizing "Dream House could easily have become overwhelmingly heavy. Instead, there's joy in sharing it." underscoring its blend of orchestral strings, club-oriented electronics and pop sensibilities, while Flood Magazine's Taila Lee commended the emotional continuity of Rodriguez's work, mentioning that while her sound had undergone numerous transformations over the past decade, it has remained "grounded" even through "the literal uprooting of her home".

While the album was met with a majority of favourable reception, some were more critical in their assessments; primarily citing its relatively short runtime (the shortest of her full-length discography) in relation to its 14-track listing, leading to questioning over the development of some songs. On Stereoboard, Jack Butler-Terry expressed that the album's 28-minute duration occasionally left ideas "not being fully fleshed out", pointedly described as "a theme that pervades the album". Nevertheless, applauding its overall scope, vision and vulnerability, he ultimately deduced Dream House "may not [be] her strongest work, but it may just be her most important."

Elise Soutar of Pitchfork would also offer a mixed review, similarly praising Rodriguez's songwriting ability, acknowledging that "she can spin pop transcendence out of thin air", but argued that the album lacked the individuality of her earlier work. Criticizing what she described as a tendency to smooth over complex emotions into "undercooked alt-pop sketches", Soutar pointed to the Hynes-assisted track, "Blue Light" as an example of Rodriguez's seemingly detached vocal delivery. She concluded that despite the deeply personal subject matter, the album's songs lacked the distinctive qualities that had previously set Rodriguez's electro-pop apart from her contemporaries, suggesting they "could be sung by any stock singer in her place."

== Track listing ==
Dream House track listing
| No. | Title | Writer(s) | Producer(s) | Length |
|---|---|---|---|---|
| 1. | "Wild Storm" | Lorely Rodriguez | Empress Of; Dave Sitek; Ciel Eckhart-Lee^{[a]} | 2:49 |
| 2. | "Blue Light" (featuring Blood Orange) | Rodriguez; Jamison Baken; Romil Hemnani; Devonté Hynes; Caila Thompson-Hannant | Empress Of; Hemnani; Cecile Believe^{[a]}; Leclair^{[a]}; Q Marsden^{[a]} | 3:08 |
| 3. | "We Have Walls" | Rodriguez; Baken; Thompson-Hannant | Empress Of; Leclair | 0:42 |
| 4. | "SYW" (featuring Cecile Believe) | Rodriguez; Baken; Thompson-Hannant | Empress Of; Leclair | 2:47 |
| 5. | "I Pray 4 U" | Rodriguez; Jessy Lanza | Empress Of; Lanza | 3:01 |
| 6. | "Missing Out On" | Rodriguez; Matt Cohn | Empress Of; Cohn | 2:11 |
| 7. | "I'm Always Home With You" | Rodriguez; Baken; Hemnani; Thompson-Hannant | Empress Of; Hemnani; Cecile Believe^{[a]}; Leclair^{[a]}; Q Marsden^{[a]} | 0:38 |
| 8. | "Waiting" | Rodriguez | Empress Of; Ciel Eckhart-Lee^{[z]} | 1:20 |
| 9. | "Machete" | Rodriguez; Baken; Thompson-Hannant; Finn Wigan | Empress Of; Wigan | 2:37 |
| 10. | "HandsOn" | Rodriguez; Cohn; Nick León; Thompson-Hannant | Empress Of; Cohn; León | 2:49 |
| 11. | "Nunca Tuve Miedo" | Rodriguez; Nate Campany; Cohn; León | Empress Of; Cohn; León | 0:40 |
| 12. | "Trainsong" | Rodriguez; Campany; Cohn; León | Empress Of; Cohn; León | 2:46 |
| 13. | "Welcome to the House" | Rodriguez; Baken; Hemnani; Thompson-Hannant | Empress Of; Hemnani; Cecile Believe^{[a]}; Leclair^{[a]}; Q Marsden^{[a]} | 0:40 |
| 14. | "Dream House" | Rodriguez; Stella Mozgawa; Thompson-Hannant | Empress Of; Cecile Believe; Mozgawa^{[a]} | 2:54 |
| Total length: | | | | 29:05 |

=== Notes ===
- ^{^[a]} signifies a additional producer

== Personnel ==
- Lorely Rodriguez – lead vocals, executive production, writing, synthesizer (all tracks)
- Reyna Dubon – spoken word (tracks 3,7,11,13)
- Jamison "Leclair" Baken – production (track 3,4,7), additional production (tracks 2,7,13), writing (tracks 2,3,4,7,9,13), cello (tracks 2,4)
- Nate Campany – writing (tracks 11,12)
- Matt Cohn – production (track 10), writing (tracks 6, 10,11, 12)
- Ciel Eckhard-Lee – engineering, additional production (tracks 1,8)
- Sage Eckhard-Lee – violin, viola (tracks 1,8)
- Romil Hemnani – production (tracks 2,7,13), writing (tracks 2,7)
- Dev Hynes – vocals, writing (track 2)
- Sarah Johnston – spoken word (track 7)
- Jessy Lanza – production, writing (track 5)
- Nick León – production, writing (tracks 10,11,12)
- Q Steven Marsden – additional production (tracks 2,7), piano (track 2)
- Stella Mozgawa – additional production, writing (track 14)
- Dave Sitek – production (track 1)
- Caila Thompson-Hannant – vocals (track 4), backing vocals (track 9), production (track 7,14), additional production (tracks 2,7,13), vocal production (track 5), writing (tracks 2,3,4,7,9,10,13,14)
- Evan Vidar – piano (tracks 3,8)
- Finn Wigan – production, writing (track 9)

Technical & Visual

- Geoff Swan – mixing
- Matt Cahill – mixing assistant
- Joe LaPorta – mastering
- Luca Ruscica – engineering (tracks 3,8)
- Julian Klincewicz – photography
- Brandon Mosquera – photography assistant
- Chris Horan – styling
- Saman Celine Mehrian – styling assistant
- lan Scott Dorey – hair
- Hooks De Jesús – makeup
- Isabelle J. Lange – styling assistant
- Zach Pacheco – calligraphy
- Hernán Ayala Tirado – album layout & design
