= For Your Consideration (Empress Of album) =

Studio album by Empress Of
- Released: March 22, 2024
- Length: 31:36
- Labels: Major Arcana; Giant Music
- Producers: Billboard; Casey MQ; Nick León; Nick Sylvester; Umru; Valley Girl

Empress Of chronology
Save Me (2022)	For Your Consideration (2024)	Dream House (2026)

Singles from For Your Consideration
- 1. "Kiss Me" Released: September 25, 2023; 2. "Femenine" Released: December 1, 2023; 3. "What's Love" Released: January 23, 2024; 4. "Preciosa" Released: March 1, 2024

Alternative cover
- "For Your Consideration (Deluxe)"

For Your Consideration is the fourth studio album by Honduran-American singer-songwriter Empress Of, released via her independent imprint, Major Arcana, with additional marketing and distribution by American independent label, Giant Music on March 22, 2024.

For Your Consideration is notable as Rodriguez's first full-length album not released through respective American and British record labels, Terrible and XL, parting ways with both of her longtime labels and going independent shortly after the release of her third album, I'm Your Empress Of in 2020. The album is also her first to include featured artists, with guest appearances by Japanese-British singer-songwriter, Rina Sawayama and American indie pop band, MUNA on the record's first and third singles, "Kiss Me" and "What's Love" respectively.

Nearly eight months after its initial release, a deluxe version of For Your Consideration was released October 4, 2024, featuring a previously unreleased track, "Loud", along with two alternative versions of songs from the album and four remixes/edits by producers Umru, Maffalda, Von Boch and Florentino respectively.

== Background and singles ==
Written over the course of 2022 into 2023, the catalyst for the album, was sparked by a short-lived romance Rodriguez was involved in, with an undisclosed film director in Los Angeles who ended their relationship in the midst of his film's "For Your Consideration" campaign for The Oscars, claiming to be unemotionally available to focus on their relationship and his career simultaneously.

Heartbroken, Rodriguez would head to the studio later that day to write the album's opener and title track, "For Your Consideration" detailing the experience. The song would give her the opportunity to explore broader themes within Hollywood for the album. Writing and recording for the album, would take place between Rodriguez's hometown of L.A., Miami and Montreal respectively, to collaborate with a slew of songwriters and producers including Nick León, Umru, Billboard, Casey MQ, Cecile Believe, Nick Sylvester and Valley Girl.

In between touring as the opener for Rina Sawayama during 2023, the two would go on to collaborate on the album's lead single, "Kiss Me" released September 25, 2023, near the end of Sawayama's North American Hold the Girl Reloaded Tour followed up by the album's second single "Femenine", on December 1, 2023.

Rodriguez officially announced For Your Consideration on January 23, 2024, alongside the release of the third single "What's Love" featuring MUNA. The album's fourth single, "Precoisa" would arrive March 1, 2024, a few weeks prior to the album's release.

== Critical reception ==
Professional ratings
Aggregate scores
Source	Rating
AnyDecentMusic?	8/10
Metacritic	85/100
Review scores
Source	Rating
Clash	9/10
DIY	4/5 stars
Dork	5/5 stars
The Line of Best Fit	7/10
Pitchfork	8.3/10
The Skinny	4/5 stars
Slant Magazine	4/5 stars

At Metacritic, which assigns a normalized rating out of 100 to reviews from mainstream critics, For Your Consideration received an average score of 85 from 6 reviews, indicating "universal acclaim"

Writing for Clash, Joshua Khan praised both the album and Rodriguez's growth as an artist since her debut stating "Whereas 2015’s ‘Me’ was a requiem for doomed romances, ‘[For Your Consideration]’ "is a bolder exploration of pop’s electronic soundscapes that shuffles turntablism and low-key escapism into chromatic highs that linger on the lips for weeks." and highlights the versatility and vulnerable nature of her songwriting ability, concluding his review with "If her latest is any proof, Rodriguez is finally comfortable with herself – not just as a writer who excels at leaving melodies on your tongue, but as a lover, a dancer, and her own shooting star."

Upon its release, Pitchfork awarded For Your Consideration with their accolade of "Best New Music" and was further characterized by writer, Eric Torres as "the most intricate Empress Of album to date" for its "dazzling showcase for Rodriguez’s unexpected vocal and production approach as she experiences the peaks and valleys of heated romance." and bolsters the eclectic roster of producers and songwriters who contributed to the album, such as Casey MQ, Umru, Cecile Believe, and Nick León for "help[ing] map out the album’s mischievously unpredictable backdrops"

== Track listing ==
For Your Consideration
No.	Title	Writer(s)	Producer(s)	Length
1.	"For Your Consideration"	Lorely Rodriguez; Casey Manierka-Quaile; Kyle Shearer; Nate Campany	Valley Girl	3:00
2.	"Lorelei"	Rodriguez; Mathieu Jomphe-Lepine	Billboard	3:00
3.	"Preciosa"	Rodriguez; Ana Mancebo; Nick León	León	2:53
4.	"Kiss Me" (featuring Rina Sawayama)	Rodriguez; Sawayama; BJ Burton; Shearer; Campany	Valley Girl; Billboard	3:21
5.	"Femenine"	Rodriguez; Nick Sylvester; Dee Mad; Mancebo	Sylvester	3:03
6.	"What Type of Girl Am I?"	Rodriguez; Manierka-Quaile; Campany	Casey MQ	2:33
7.	"Cura"	Rodriguez; León; Mancebo	León	2:33
8.	"Fácil"	Rodriguez; Jaan Umru Rothenberg; Jarina De Marco	Umru	2:36
9.	"Sucia"	Rodriguez; Cecile Believe; Rothenberg; De Marco	Umru	2:27
10.	"Baby Boy"	Rodriguez; Manierka-Quaile; Shearer; Campany	Valley Girl	3:01
11.	"What's Love" (featuring Muna)	Rodriguez; Adam Mark Crisp; Shearer; Campany; Catherine Gavin	Shearer	3:09
Total length:				31:36

Deluxe edition
No.	Title	Writer(s)	Producer(s)	Length
1.	"Loud"	Rodriguez; Jomphe-Lepine	Billboard	2:19
2.	"Femenine (Maffalda Remix)" (featuring Urias)	Rodriguez; Sylvester; Dee Mad; Mancebo; Arthur Pampolin Gomes; Lorena Urias Martins da Silva	Maffalda; Sylvester	2:54
3.	"Cura (Von Boch Remix)"	Rodriguez; León; Mancebo; Philip von Boch Scully	Von Boch; León	3:07
4.	"Preciosa (Florentino Megamix)"	Rodriguez; Ana Mancebo; Nick León; Yeshe Johann Bahamon Beesley	Florentino; León	3:58
5.	"Sucia (Umru Liturgy)"	Rodriguez; Cecile Believe; Rothenberg; De Marco	Umru	3:19
6.	"What's Love (Piano Version)"	Rodriguez; Crisp; Shearer; Campany; Gavin	Evan Vidar	3:20
7.	"Baby Boy (Acoustic Version)"	Rodriguez; Manierka-Quaile; Shearer; Campany	Mikey Freedom Hart	2:59
Total length:				22:00

== Personnel ==
- Lorely Rodriguez – lead vocals, executive production, writing (all tracks), creative direction
- BJ Burton – writing (track 4)
- Nate Campany – production (tracks 1,4,10,11), writing (tracks 1,4,6,10,11)
- Aroldo "V1fro" Contreras – additional production (tracks 3,7)
- Adam Mark Crisp – writing (track 11)
- Catherine Hope Gavin – vocals, writing (track 11)
- Nick León – production, writing (tracks 3,7)
- Mathieu Jomphe-Lepine - production, writing (track 2), additional production (track 4)
- Wissem "Dee Mad" Larfaoui – writing (track 5)
- Ana Mancebo – writing (tracks 3,5,7)
- Casey Manierka-Quaile – production (track 6), writing (tracks 1,6,10), additional production (tracks 1,10)
- Jarina De Marco – writing (tracks 8,9)
- Josette Maskin – vocals (track 11)
- Naomi McPherson – vocals, vocal production (track 11)
- Jaan Umru Rothenberg – production, writing (tracks 8,9)
- Rina Sawayama – vocals, writing (track 4)
- Kyle Shearer – production, writing (tracks 1,4,10,11)
- Nick Sylvester – production, writing (track 5)
- Caila Thompson-Hannant – writing (track 9)

Technical & Visual

- Geoff Swan – mixing
- Matt Cahill – mixing assistant
- Joe LaPorta - mastering
- Bethany Vargas – photography, creative direction
- Chris Horan - styling
- Greer Heavrin - styling assistant
- Saman Celine Mehrian - styling assistant
- Antoine Martinez - hair
- Edwin Monzon - body paint
- Marla Vazquez - makeup
- Stephanie Cappiello - set design
- Hernán Ayala Tirado - album layout & design
- Elena Awbrey - management
