= Feminine (disambiguation) =

Feminine, or femininity, normally refers to qualities associated with women.

Feminine or femininity may also refer to:

== Language ==
- Feminine (grammar), a grammatical gender
- Feminine cadence, a final chord falling in a metrically weak position
- Feminine rhyme, a rhyme that matches two or more syllables at the end of lines with the final syllable unstressed

== Entertainment and art ==
=== Music ===
- "Feminine", a song by Swift from Thoughts Are Thought (1999)
- "Feminine #3", mixed media art by Doren Robbins, American poet, prose poet, fiction writer, essayist, mixed media artist, and educator (2000)
- "Femininity", song from the musical comedy Oh, Captain! (1953)
- "Femininity" (song)", song from the film Summer Magic (1963)
- "Femininity", song by Eric Benét from True to Myself (1996)
- "Femininity", song by John Frusciante from Smile from the Streets You Hold (1997)
- "Femininity", song by Cheyne, Australian singer, songwriter and producer from Something Wicked This Way Comes (2004)
- "Femininity", song and music video by Charlene Choi and Gillian Chung (2021)

=== Film and video ===
- Femininity (film), 2020 Iranian feature documentary film
- Femininity, 2024 video art by Samantha Nye, American video artist and painter

=== Literature ===
- Feminine Endings, a musicological feminist work by Susan McClary published in 1991
- The Feminine Mystique, 1957 book by Betty Friedan, American feminist writer and activist
- Femininity (book), 1984 book by Susan Brownmiller, American journalist, author and feminist activist

=== Other uses ===
- "Femininity", a publicity theme of the All-American Girls Professional Baseball League

== See also ==
- "Femenine" (1974), composition for chamber ensemble by Julius Eastman, American minimalist composer
- "Femenine" (2023), song by Empress Of, American singer, songwriter, musician, and record producer
- Female (disambiguation)
- Male (disambiguation)
- Masculine (disambiguation)
