= Male (disambiguation) =

Male, in biology, is the half of a sex system that produces sperm cells.

Male may also refer to:

== Gender ==
- Male, the gender of men and boys
  - Man, a male adult
  - Boy, a young male person, usually a child or adolescent
  - Masculinity, attributes associated with men and boys

== Art and entertainment ==
- Male (film), a 2015 Indian film
- Male (Foetus album), a 1992 live album by Foetus
- Male (Natalie Imbruglia album), a 2015 studio album by Natalie Imbruglia
- Male (band), a German band
- Il Male, an Italian satirical magazine published in Italy between 1978 and 1982

== Places ==
- Malé, the capital of the Maldives
  - Malé Island, the island the city is on
- Malé, Italy, a municipality in the province of Trento, Italy
- Małe, Łódź Voivodeship, a village in central Poland
- Małe, Pomeranian Voivodeship, a village in northern Poland
- Mâle, Orne, a village in France
- Male, Belgium, a quarter in Bruges
- Male, Vikramgad, a village in India
- Male (woreda), a woreda in Ethiopia
- Male, Mauritania, a town in Mauritania
- Malé, a village and part of Brtnice in the Czech Republic

== People named Male ==
- Male (surname) (including a list of people with the name)
- Male Rao Holkar (1745–1767), Maharaja of Indore
- The Malês, as in the Malê revolt
- Male Sa'u (born 1987), Japanese professional rugby union footballer

== Other uses ==
- Masculine gender, in languages with grammatical gender
- Male connector, in hardware and electronics
- Male language, several languages
- Maale people, an ethnic group of Ethiopia
- Medium-altitude long-endurance unmanned aerial vehicle, an unmanned aerial vehicle
- malE, a bacterial gene encoding maltose-binding protein

== See also ==
- Female (disambiguation)
- Male and Female (disambiguation)
- Masculine (disambiguation)
- Feminine (disambiguation)
- Mail (disambiguation)
- Mele
