= Empress Of =

American singer-songwriter (born 1989)

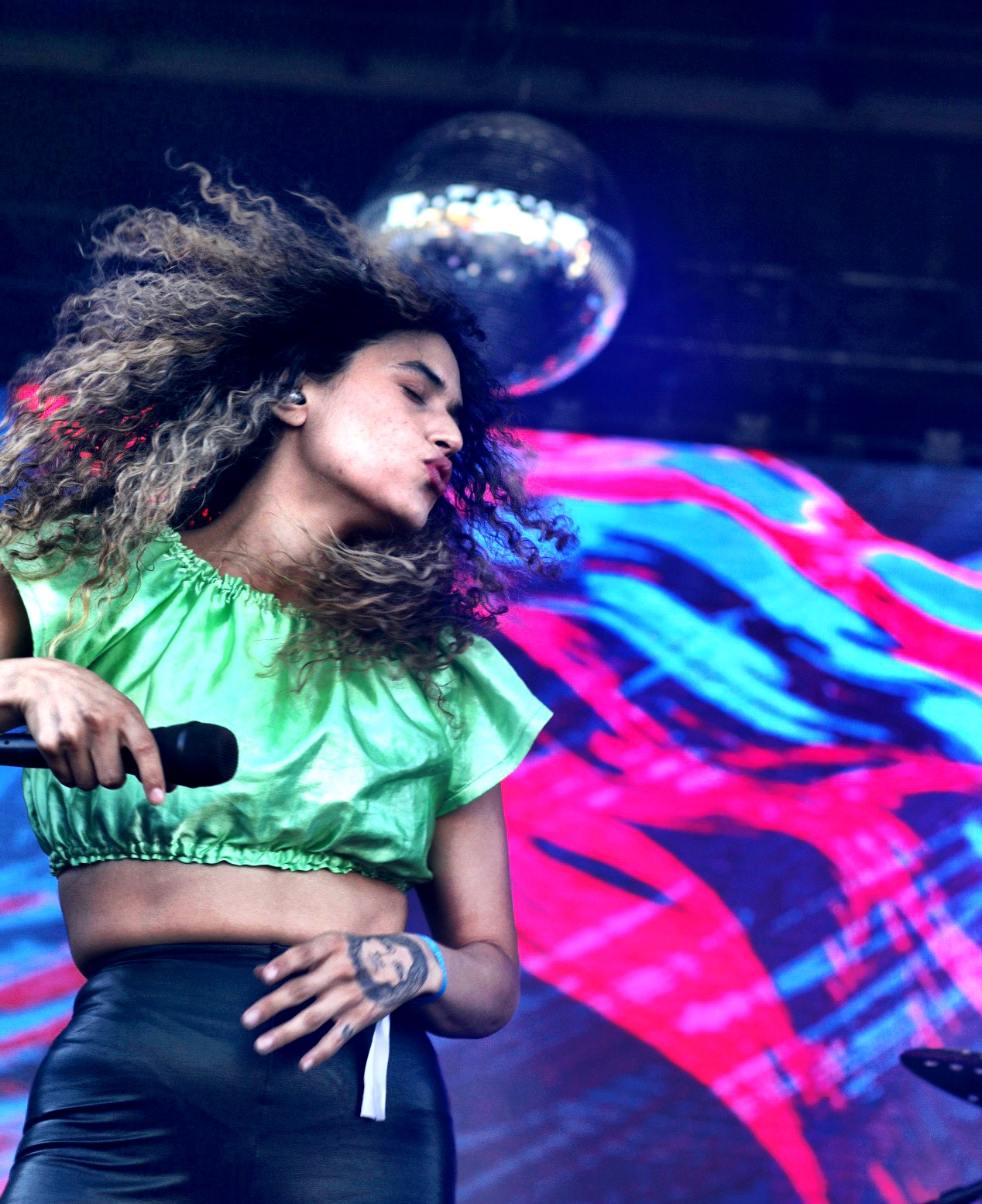
- Empress Of performing in 2019

Background information
- Born: Lorely Rodriguez; October 19, 1989 (age 37)
- Origin: Los Angeles, California, U.S.
- Education: Berklee College of Music
- Genres: Dream pop; alternative R&B; synth-pop; electronica; experimental
- Occupations: Singer; songwriter; musician; record producer
- Years active: 2011–present
- Labels: Major Arcana; Giant Music; Terrible; XL; Double Denim; No Recordings; Big Love
- Website: empressof.com

Lorely Rodriguez (born October 19, 1989), known professionally as Empress Of, is a Honduran-American singer, songwriter, musician, and record producer based in Los Angeles, California.

To date, she has released five studio albums; her critically acclaimed debut, Me (2015), Us (2018), I'm Your Empress Of (2020) via XL Recordings and Terrible Records and For Your Consideration (2024), jointly through her own independent imprint, Major Arcana and American independent label, Giant Music. Her fifth studio album, Dream House was released on September 18, 2026.

Over the course of her career, Rodriguez has toured and collaborated with the likes of Dev Hynes, Jim-E Stack, Lorde, Rina Sawayama, Carly Rae Jepsen, Caroline Polachek, Maggie Rogers, Amber Mark and performed internationally at a series of high-profile music festivals, such as Coachella, Pitchfork Music Festival, Outside Lands, Corona Capital, Primavera Sound and Capitol Hill Block Party.

== Career ==
=== 2011–2016: Early releases, Systems and Me ===
After graduating with a sound engineering degree from Boston's Berklee College of Music in 2011, Rodriguez moved to New York City and quickly broke into the local music scene performing with Celestial Shore, a Brooklyn-based experimental rock band, along with American musician, Sam Owens, but soon left the group to focus on her own music.

In 2012, Rodriguez initially gained attention for anonymously releasing a series of one minute-long demos (via YouTube) prefaced only by a solid color entitled "Colorminutes". Her first 7" single, "Champagne", was released soon after on November 5, 2012, through a limited run via No Recordings.

Rodriguez's stage name was inspired by a tarot card reading she did with a friend. "The first card he pulled out was an Empress card and I was like, 'It's me, I am Empress'", she recounts in an interview with Noisey. "The Empress card is connected to fertility and mothering and strength. It's kind of nice to have those feelings."

On April 2, 2013, her bilingual four-track EP, Systems was released via Double Denim and Terrible Records in the UK and North America respectively. Following her EP's release, Rodriguez performed extensively, showcasing at SXSW, Iceland Airwaves and Pitchfork's Summer Music Festival, and toured as a support act for the likes of Jamie Lidell, Jungle, Kimbra, and Florence and the Machine.

In 2013, Rodriguez signed to British independent label, XL Recordings via a joint deal through Terrible and began to work on material for her debut album, while residing in Brooklyn. A few weeks into writing, finding New York's environment was negatively effecting her efforts thus far, she embarked on a retreat to Valle de Bravo, a secluded village in Mexico. The isolation of the trip allowed Rodriguez to be fully introspective and truly begin the writing and pre-production for her debut at the end of 2013. Upon her return to New York, she would complete the rest of the album over the course of the following year.

On April 14, 2015, "Water Water", the first single from her unannounced debut full-length, was released via XL/Terrible. A Spanish version of the track, "Agua Agua", was released on June 8, 2015, exclusively via SoundCloud. The alternative version, meant as a way for Rodriguez's mother to connect and listen to her daughter's music.

On June 20, 2015, the album's second single, "Kitty Kat", was released alongside the announcement of her debut album, Me. Two more singles would follow shy of the album's release; "How Do You Do It" and "Standard" in September 2015, before its eventual arrival on September 11, 2015, via XL Recordings and Terrible. In the midst of Me's rollout, Rodriguez would also release a cover of Katy Perry's hit song "Hot n Cold" on August 31, 2015, via SoundCloud for Rookie Magazine's "Theme Song" series.

The album met critical acclaim from mainstream critics and peaked at number five on Billboard's Top Dance/Electronic Albums chart upon its release. A majority of publications praised Rodriguez's intensely personal and more direct approach to her songwriting and experimental production, in contrast to the layered opaqueness of her earlier work. Following its release, Rodriguez toured the UK and North America throughout the fall of 2015 in promotion of the album, with then-Awful Records artist, ABRA and North America with Canadian electronic duo, Purity Ring respectively.

The video for the album's fifth single, "Icon", was released on November 16, 2015, via Urban Outfitters' "UO Video Series".

"Woman is a Word", a b-side from the album, was released on March 14, 2016. It was later added to a deluxe version of Me released as a limited edition cassette during her 2016 UK & European Tour via XL/Terrible.

=== 2017–2019: Us ===
After the release of Me, Rodriguez moved back to Los Angeles from New York, with the goal of collaborating with musical contemporaries, while also being closer to family and reconnecting with her hometown roots.

Rodriguez released a standalone single, "Go to Hell", on July 12, 2017, via Terrible. It was co-written with former Chairlift vocalist Caroline Polachek. She also featured on two singles for Los Angeles producers, DJDS with the Billboard-charting "Why Don't You Come On" featuring El Paso R&B singer, Khalid; and a cover of Lana Del Rey's Lust for Life single, "Love" released on August 29, 2017, and December 1, 2017, respectively, through Loma Vista Recordings for their third studio album, Big Wave More Fire.

On April 11, 2018, the double single "Trust Me Baby / In Dreams" premiered on Zane Lowe's Apple Music Beats 1 radio show and released via Terrible. The former was co-produced by Cole M.G.N.

On August 20, 2018, Rodriguez's announced her second studio album, Us, which was released on October 19, 2018, via XL/Terrible. The album's second single, "When I'm With Him", was released on August 22, 2018. The song would later be featured on the soundtrack of the video game eFootball Pro Evolution Soccer 2020.

The album's third and fourth singles, "Love For Me" and "I Don't Even Smoke Weed", were released on September 26 and October 18, 2018, respectively, prior to the album's release. She featured on the title track of Khalid's debut EP, Suncity, which was also released on October 19, 2018, via RCA Records.

With the release of Us, Rodriguez embarked on an international headlining tour with opening support from Colombian electronic duo, Salt Cathedral on the North American leg of the tour, and a string of summer music festivals including Sideways, Primavera Sound and Meow Wolf Vortex Music Festival, throughout 2019. She concluded the year featuring on Australian producer, Kito's single, "Wild Girl", released on September 27, 2019, via UMG Recordings, and touring as the support act for Maggie Rogers' Heard It in a Past Life and Lizzo's Cuz I Love You Too North American fall tours.

=== 2020–2021: I'm Your Empress Of and becoming independent with Major Arcana ===
On April 12, 2020, Rodriguez released her third studio album, I'm Your Empress Of, via XL Recordings and Terrible. The album was preceded by the single, "Give Me Another Chance", released and premiered March 3. 2020 via Zane Lowe's Apple Music Beats 1 radio show. Due to the 2020 COVID-19 crisis, no touring or live performances could be done to promote the album.

During 2020, Rodriguez founded and announced the start of her own record label, Major Arcana, via partnering with US-based artist management company, mtheory. The announcement marked the fulfilment of her contracts with XL Recordings and Terrible Records, thus allowing all future releases to be fully independent under her own brand.

On October 27, 2020, Rodriguez released her first single via Major Arcana, "You've Got To Feel", featuring Grammy-nominated singer/songwriter Amber Mark, while subsequently releasing another single, "Broken", for the soundtrack of the Amazon Prime Video series The Wilds on Nov 20, 2020.

During 2021, Rodriguez was featured on American singer/producer MNDR's single "Love in Reverse", released March 31, 2021, from her second studio album, Hell To Be You Baby, via Watersound Records.

On April 30, 2021, Rodriguez announced partnering with an Ad Council-backed national campaign called "Sound It Out Together". The purpose of the campaign was to highlight youth mental health and create an outlet for adolescents of color, to express their emotions and experiences through music. With assistance from professional songwriters (Rodriguez, KAMAUU, Lauren Jauregui and Tobe Nwigwe respectively), the subjects discussed by the artists and children were turned into fully-produced songs and released as a compilation EP for the campaign via Mass Appeal. Rodriguez's involvement included the single, "One Breath", a collaboration with a 14-year-old girl named Marianne on their shared experience of both being first-generation Latin Americans and balancing that duality or double consciousness through daily life.

=== 2022–2024: Save Me and For Your Consideration ===
On April 8, 2022, Rodriguez premiered "Save Me", the first single from her third EP of the same name, which was released on June 24, 2022, via her independent imprint, Major Arcana.

The announcement of the EP, produced by Rodriguez with additional production from frequent collaborator, BJ Burton and Johan Lennox, was made through the release of the second single, "Dance for You", on May 25, 2022. On June 7, 2022, Rodriguez was announced as the main support for Carly Rae Jepsen's "So Nice" North American tour, which proceeded during the fall of 2022.

A remix EP of "Dance for You" was released on November 18, 2022, featuring remixes/edits of the single by Blue Hawaii, DJ Kirby, DJ Python, Nick León and Sassy 009.

In 2023, Rodriguez provided tour support as the opening act for Japanese–British singer, Rina Sawayama throughout the European leg of her "Hold the Girl World Tour" during February 2023 and the remaining North American leg during the fall of 2023.

During the latter half of that tour, the two would release the collaborative single "Kiss Me" on September 25, 2023, from Rodriguez's then-unannounced fourth studio album, via Major Arcana and Giant Music respectively.

The album's second single, "Femenine", was released on December 1, 2023, with an accompanying music video directed by famed American dancer and choreographer, Ryan Heffington.

On January 23, 2024, Rodriguez announced her fourth studio album, For Your Consideration, which was released on March 22, 2024, via Major Arcana and Giant Music. The album was preceded by third and fourth singles, "What's Love" featuring American indie pop group, MUNA and "Preciosa" released January 24 and March 1. 2024 respectively. Upon its release, For Your Consideration was received favourably, based on the album receiving an average score of 85 from 6 reviews on aggregator website, Metacritic, indicating "universal acclaim", including being awarded as Pitchfork's "Best New Music", who described the album as her "most intricate to date".

Around this time, Rodriguez would also feature on the song, "4evA" (alongside American producer, "Kingdom") by Grenadian-British electronic musical artist, Shygirl off her fourth EP, Club Shy released February 9, 2024 via Because Music. and provide additional vocals on Austrian producer and musical artist, salute's debut album, TRUE MAGIC released July 12, 2024 via Ninja Tune on the songs, "one of those nights" and the album's lead single, "system" released February 9, 2024.

To build anticipation for For Your Consideration, Rodriguez embarked on a pair of promotional in-store appearances at record stores, Rough Trade and Amoeba Music in New York and Los Angeles within the week of its release. Promotion for the album would extend further into a series of smaller nightclub residencies in North America, at Elsewhere in New York City, The Drake Underground in Toronto and El Rey Theatre in Los Angeles during the spring of 2024.

On May 14, 2024, Rodriguez officially announced her headlining world tour with shows in North America, Mexico, UK and Europe, which proceeded throughout the fall of 2024.

On July 24, 2024, American record label, Sub Pop announced a tribute album in honor of the late American singer-songwriter, Margo Guryan, entitled Like Someone I Know: A Celebration Of Margo Guryan. released November 8. 2024 (marking the third anniversary since Guryan's passing), the album features re-imagined covers of Guryan's first and only studio album, 1968's Take a Picture by several contemporary musical artists including Rodriguez, Clairo, Frankie Cosmos, TOPS, and Kate Bollinger. Rodriguez's cover of "Someone I Know" was released alongside the announcement as the album's lead single.

A deluxe version of For Your Consideration was announced by Rodriguez on September 5, 2024, after teasing a remix of "Femenine" by Brazilian DJ, Maffalda, featuring Brazilian singer/songwriter and model, Urias on social media the week prior. Released incrementally before the start of her 2024 North American tour, the first half of the deluxe (including four remixes by DJ's/producers, Maffalda, Umru, Von Boch and Florentino respectively) arrived September 13, 2024, with Maffalda's remix released the following day of the announcement as a single on September 6, 2024. The remaining half of the deluxe (additionally featuring the b-side, "Loud" and alternative versions of "What's Love" and Baby Boy" from the album) was released October 4, 2024.

=== 2025–present: Dream House ===
At the beginning of 2025, Rodriguez was directly impacted by the Southern California wildfires that took place in January, following the loss of her maternal family home in the natural disaster, which ultimately displaced her mother, as well over 150,000 residents in the Greater Los Angeles area and San Diego County.

On May 8, 2025, Rodriguez was revealed as one of the opening acts for the North American leg of New Zealand musical artist, Lorde on her Ultrasound World Tour, which commenced through the fall of 2025, in support of her fourth studio album, Virgin. Alongside with Rodriguez, the tour's remaining support acts included, Blood Orange, The Japanese House, Nilufer Yanya, Chanel Beads, Jim-E Stack, and Oklou. A few days following the tour announcement, "Tomas", a single by Mexican singer-songwriter, Girl Ultra featuring Rodriguez and produced by Canadian musical duo, Chromeo would be released, May 13, 2025, via Big Dada. The single would later appear on Girl Ultra and Chromeo's collaborative album, RRRomeo released October 9, 2026 via Big Dada.

A week prior to her first appearance on the Ultrasound tour, Rodriguez would drop the single, "Blasting Through the Speakers"; co-written and produced by American songwriter, Mike Sabath on October 2, 2025.

Several months later, another single "Dream House"; co-written by Warpaint drummer Stella Mozgawa and produced by Canadian musician Cecile Believe would arrive on March 27, 2026. On June 26, 2026, Dream House was revealed as the title of her fifth studio album, alongside the release of the second single, "Wild Storm".

Although initially presumed to be the album's lead single, "Blasting Through the Speakers" was ultimately left off the final track listing and considered a standalone release. Released on September 18, 2026 via Major Arcana and Giant Music, Dream House features guest appearances by Believe, Dev Hynes and Rodriguez's mother, Reyna Dubon, with the former featured on the album's third single, “SYW” released August 7, 2026. The fourth single, "HandsOn" would follow a few weeks later on August 28, 2026, before concluding the project's release cycle with Hynes' collaboration, "Blue Light" (the fifth and final single) a day prior of the album's release on September 17, 2026.

Just ahead of the holiday season, Rodriguez also released an Apple Music exclusive cover of the 1950 Christmas classic "Frosty the Snowman" on November 13, 2026, as part of the platform's Carols Covered playlist. Her rendition would be heavily influenced by Scottish rock band, Cocteau Twins' version from their 1993 EP, Snow.

== Musical style ==
=== Influences ===
Lorely's first experiences with music were listening to her father's cassette tapes of the Beatles and Pet Shop Boys. She cites Julee Cruise, Elizabeth Fraser of the Cocteau Twins, the Zombies, and the Beach Boys as some of her musical inspirations.

== Personal life ==
Rodriguez is a first-generation Honduran American. She was raised by her mother, Reyna, in the Los Angeles metropolitan area. Her father, Adán, is one of the original pianists and founding members of the Honduran Latin music ensemble, Banda Blanca.

She is a 2007 YoungArts alumnus. She has a degree from Berklee College of Music in Boston.

== Discography ==
=== Studio albums ===
- Me (2015)
- Us (2018)
- I'm Your Empress Of (2020)
- For Your Consideration (2024)
- Dream House (2026)

=== Extended plays ===
- Systems (2013)
- Tristeza (2014)
- Save Me (2022)

=== Mixtapes ===
- Colorminutes (2013)

== Singles ==
=== As lead artist ===
| Title | Year | Album |
|---|---|---|
| "Champagne" | 2012 | Non-album singles |
| "Realize You" | 2013 | Non-album singles |
| "Water Water" | 2015 | Me |
| "Kitty Kat" | 2015 | Me |
| "How Do You Do It" | 2015 | Me |
| "Standard" | 2015 | Me |
| "Icon" | 2015 | Me |
| "Woman Is a Word" | 2016 | Non-album singles |
| "Go to Hell" | 2017 | Non-album singles |
| "Trust Me Baby" | 2018 | Us |
| "When I'm with Him" | 2018 | Us |
| "Love for Me" | 2018 | Us |
| "I Don't Even Smoke Weed" | 2018 | Us |
| "Call Me" | 2020 | The Turning (Original Motion Picture Soundtrack) |
| "Give Me Another Chance" | 2020 | I'm Your Empress Of |
| "Love Is a Drug" | 2020 | I'm Your Empress Of |
| "You've Got to Feel" (featuring Amber Mark) | 2020 | Non-album single |
| "Broken" | 2020 | The Wilds (Amazon Original Soundtrack) |
| "One Breath" | 2021 | Sound It Out - EP via "Sound It Out Together" Campaign |
| "Save Me" | 2022 | Save Me |
| "Dance for You" | 2022 | Save Me |
| "Turn the Table" (w/ Jim-E Stack) | 2022 | Save Me |
| "Kiss Me" (featuring Rina Sawayama) | 2023 | For Your Consideration |
| "Femenine" | 2023 | For Your Consideration |
| "What's Love" (featuring MUNA) | 2024 | For Your Consideration |
| "Preciosa" | 2024 | For Your Consideration |
| "Someone I Know" (Margo Guryan cover) | 2024 | Like Someone I Know: A Celebration of Margo Guryan |
| "Femenine" (Maffalda Remix featuring Urias) | 2024 | For Your Consideration (Deluxe) |
| "Little Secret" | 2025 | The Buccaneers: Season 2 (Apple TV+ Official Series Soundtrack) |
| "Blasting Through the Speakers" | 2025 | Non-album single |
| "Dance of the Sugar Plum Fairy" (credited as Lorely Rodriguez) | 2025 | Oh. What. Fun. (Original Motion Picture Soundtrack) |
| "Dream House" | 2026 | Dream House |
| "Wild Storm" | 2026 | Dream House |
| "SYW" (featuring Cecile Believe) | 2026 | Dream House |
| "HandsOn" | 2026 | Dream House |
| "Blue Light" (featuring Blood Orange) | 2026 | Dream House |
| "Frosty the Snowman"  Music Exclusive | 2026 | Non-album single |

=== As featured artist ===
| Title | Year | Peak chart positions | | | Album |
| Title | Year | US Dance/Elec. | US | Dance/Mix Show | Album |
|---|---|---|---|---|---|
| "Create Your Love" (Amateur Best featuring Empress Of) | 2013 | — | — | — | Double Denim Vol. 1 |
| "The Way That You Like" (Pional featuring Empress Of) | 2016 | — | — | — | When Love Hurts |
| "Reformer" (Darkstar featuring Empress Of) | 2016 | — | — | — | Made to Measure |
| "Best to You" (Blood Orange featuring Empress Of) | 2016 | — | — | — | Freetown Sound |
| "Stonefist" (Remix) (Health and Boys Noize featuring Empress Of) | 2017 | — | — | — | DISCO3+ |
| "Why Don't You Come On" (DJDS featuring Khalid & Empress Of) | 2017 | 30 | — | — | Big Wave More Fire |
| "Love" (DJDS featuring Empress Of) | 2017 | — | — | — | Big Wave More Fire |
| Zombie Conqueror (Dirty Projectors featuring Empress Of) | 2018 | — | — | — | Lamp Lit Prose |
| "Suncity" (Khalid featuring Empress Of) | 2018 | — | 88 | — | Suncity |
| "Red Wine" (MØ featuring Empress Of) | 2018 | — | — | — | Forever Neverland |
| "Naughty" (Tommy Genesis featuring Empress Of) | 2018 | — | — | — | Tommy Genesis |
| "Connect" (Toro y Moi featuring Empress Of) | 2019 | — | — | — | Smartbeats |
| "Wild Girl" (Kito featuring Empress Of) | 2019 | — | — | 28 | Non-album singles |
| "Tennis Fan" (Banoffee featuring Empress Of) | 2019 | — | — | — | Look at Us Now Dad |
| "Note to Self" (Jim-E Stack featuring Empress Of) | 2020 | — | — | — | EPHEMERA |
| "Love In Reverse" (MNDR featuring Empress Of) | 2021 | — | — | — | Hell To Be You Baby |
| "Vacío" (Jarina De Marco featuring Empress Of) | 2021 | — | — | — | Vacío |
| "take me back" (Isomonstrosity featuring Empress Of & Bryce Dessner) | 2022 | — | — | — | Isomonstrosity |
| "Wild N Sweet" (Jam City featuring Empress Of) | 2023 | — | — | — | Jam City Presents EFM |
| "Highway" (Lewis OfMan featuring Empress Of) | 2023 | — | — | — | Cristal Medium Blue |
| "4evA" (Shygirl featuring Empress Of & Kingdom) | 2024 | — | — | — | Club Shy |
| "side by side [rebirth]" (Logic1000 featuring Empress Of) | 2024 | — | — | — | mother :;~ rebirth |
| "one of those nights" (salute featuring Empress Of) | 2024 | — | — | — | TRUE MAGIC |
| "With Me" (TRY featuring Empress Of) | 2024 | — | — | — | Chapter Two |
| "Galina" (Allie X featuring Empress Of) | 2024 | — | — | — | Girl with No Face (Deluxe) |
| "Tomás" (Girl Ultra featuring Chromeo & Empress Of) | 2025 | — | — | — | RRRomeo |

=== Remixes ===
| Title | Year | Artist(s) | Album |
|---|---|---|---|
| "bodyache" (Empress Of Remix) | 2015 | Purity Ring | Non-album single |
| "Romeo" (Empress Of Remix) | 2016 | Chairlift | Non-album single |
| "Genghis Khan" (Empress Of Remix) | 2016 | Miike Snow | Genghis Khan (Remixes) |
| "How Do You Do It" (Empress Of Remix) | 2016 | Empress Of | Me (Limited Edition - Cassette) |
| "Never Enough" (Empress Of Remix) | 2017 | Oyinda | Non-album single |
| "Ta Que Tiembla" (Empress Of Remix) | 2020 | Buscabulla | Regresa Remixes |
| "Johnny" (Empress Of Remix) | 2020 | Tei Shi | Die 4 Ur Love (Deluxe) |
| "Man's World" (Empress Of Remix featuring Pabllo Vittar) | 2021 | MARINA | Man's World (Remixes) |
| "Cherub" (Empress Of Remix) | 2023 | Coco & Clair Clair | Sexy (Deluxe) |
| "Mutations" (Empress Of Remix) | 2024 | Nilüfer Yanya | My Method Actor - The Remixes |

== Songwriting & production discography ==
List of songs co-written, featuring production involvement, recorded performance and/or role served for other artists outside of featured appearances; showing year released, album name and all songwriters credited
| Track | Year | Artist(s) | Album | Credit(s) | | | | |
| Track | Year | Artist(s) | Album | Writing | Production | Performance | Role/Instrumentation | Songwriter(s) |
|---|---|---|---|---|---|---|---|---|
| "Waves at Night" | 2012 | Moons | Bloody Mouth | | | Yes | Lead vocals (uncredited feature) | Patrick Canaday |
| "Dark Still" | 2012 | Celestial Shore | Non-album single | Yes | | Yes | Vocals | Sam Owens, Greg Albert, Max Almario, Lorely Rodriguez |
| "Xtra Life" | 2012 | Celestial Shore | Celestial Shore/Shopping; Spree Split Tape | Yes | | Yes | Vocals, guitar | Sam Owens, Greg Albert, Max Almario, Lorely Rodriguez |
| "Tick Tock" | 2012 | Celestial Shore | Celestial Shore/Shopping; Spree Split Tape | Yes | | Yes | Vocals, guitar | Sam Owens, Greg Albert, Max Almario, Lorely Rodriguez |
| "Growing Old" | 2012 | Celestial Shore | Celestial Shore/Shopping; Spree Split Tape | Yes | | Yes | Vocals, guitar | Sam Owens, Greg Albert, Max Almario, Lorely Rodriguez |
| "Don't Fall" | 2012 | Celestial Shore | Celestial Shore/Shopping; Spree Split Tape | Yes | | Yes | Vocals, guitar | Sam Owens, Greg Albert, Max Almario, Lorely Rodriguez |
| "Stairs Under Stars" | 2013 | Celestial Shore | 10x | | | Yes | Additional vocals | Owens, Albert, Almario |
| "Sleep" | 2013 | Celestial Shore | 10x | | | Yes | Additional vocals | Owens, Albert, Almario |
| "Car Car" | 2013 | Celestial Shore | 10x | | | Yes | Additional vocals | Owens, Albert, Almario |
| "Swimmer's Sinking Feeling" | 2013 | Celestial Shore | 10x | | | Yes | Additional vocals | Owens, Albert, Almario |
| "Even After" | 2013 | Celestial Shore | 10x | | | Yes | Additional vocals | Owens, Albert, Almario, Stephen Biedrzyck |
| "Die for Us" | 2013 | Celestial Shore | Non-album single | Yes | | Yes | Vocals, synthesizer | Owens, Albert, Almario, Rodriguez |
| "Creation Myth" | 2014 | Celestial Shore | Enter Ghost | | | Yes | Additional vocals | Owens, Albert, Almario |
| "Trouble" | 2014 | Celestial Shore | Enter Ghost | | | Yes | Additional vocals | Owens, Albert, Almario |
| "Gimme Gimme" | 2017 | IGBO | Indigo Green Brown Orange | Co | | Yes | Backing vocals | Benjamin Julia, Sylvester Onyejiaka, Rodriguez |
| "The Foundation" | 2017 | IGBO | Indigo Green Brown Orange | No | | Yes | Backing vocals | Julia, Onyejiaka |
| "Right Now" (featuring Syd) | 2018 | Dirty Projectors | Lamp Lit Prose | No | | Yes | Additional vocals | David Longstreth |
| "You're Gonna Miss Me" (Turntable Orchestra cover) | 2018 | Michael Austin | Bring Down The Walls | No | Yes | Yes | Producer, synth, programming, engineering, editing | Hippie Torrales, Paul Scott |
| "Blueprint" | 2019 | Lafawndah | Ancestor Boy | | | Yes | Additional synth | Yasmine Dubois, Nate Donmoyer, João Pais Filipe, Jeremiah James, Valentina Magaletti, Amanda Warner, Nick Weiss |
| "Don't Close The Door" | 2020 | Denai Moore | Modern Dread | Yes | | No | | Denai Moore, Alex Robertshaw, Tom A.D Fuller, Rodriguez |
| "system" | 2024 | salute | TRUE MAGIC | Yes | | Yes | Additional vocals | Felix Nyajo, Samuel Knowles, Adam Smith, Calia Thompson-Hannant, Adam 'Baz' Kaye, Rodriguez |
| "Renegade (We Never Run)" (featuring Jarina De Marco) | 2024 | Raja Kumari & Stefflon Don | Arcane League of Legends: Season 2 | Co | | No | | Svetha Yallapragada Rao, Stephanie Victoria Allen, Jarina De Marco, Adrianne Gonzalez, Sebastien Najand, Rodriguez |
| "What Would We Do" | 2025 | Emily Kokal | The Buccaneers: Season 2 (Apple TV+ Official Series Soundtrack) | No | No | Yes | Synth | Emily Kokal |
| "system" (Karma Kid Remix) | 2025 | salute | TRUE MAGIC, DELUXE | Yes | | Yes | Main vocals (unlisted feature) | Nyajo, Knowles, Smith, Thompson-Hannant, Kaye, Rodriguez |
