= Trust Me Baby / In Dreams =

Single by Empress Of

from the album Us
- Released: April 11, 2018
- Recorded: 2017
- Genre: Latin pop; electropop; alternative R&B; art pop
- Length: 6:31
- Label: Terrible
- Songwriter(s): Lorely Rodriguez
- Producer(s): Lorely Rodriguez, Cole M.G.N

Empress Of singles chronology
"Go To Hell" (2017)	"Trust Me Baby / In Dreams" (2018)	"When I’m with Him" (2018)

"Trust Me Baby / In Dreams" is a double A-side single by American musician Empress Of, released on April 11, 2018, through Terrible Records. with "Trust Me Baby" later appearing on her second studio album, Us (2018). The two songs prominently feature Rodriguez singing in both Spanish and English, fluidly switching between the two languages, in the same vein of her 2013 EP Systems.

"Trust Me Baby" was co-produced by LA producer and former Ariel Pink touring guitarist, Cole M.G.N.

== Track listing ==
Digital download
No.	Title	Writer(s)	Producer(s)	Length
1.	"Trust Me Baby"	Lorely Rodriguez	Rodriguez; Cole M.G.N^{[a]}	3:18
2.	"In Dreams"	Rodriguez	Rodriguez	3:13
Total length:				6:31

Notes

- ^{^[a]} signifies a co-producer.
