= Us (Empress Of album) =

Studio album by Empress Of
- Released: October 19, 2018
- Label: Terrible, XL
- Producer: Lorely Rodriguez, Dev Hynes, DJDS, Pional, Cole M.G.N.

Empress Of chronology
Me (2015)	Us (2018)	I'm Your Empress Of (2020)

Singles from Us
- 1. "Trust Me Baby" Released: April 11, 2018; 2. "When I'm with Him" Released: August 22, 2018; 3. "Love for Me" Released: September 24, 2018; 4. "I Don't Even Smoke Weed" Released: October 17, 2018

Professional ratings
Aggregate scores
Source	Rating
Metacritic	74/100
Review scores
Source	Rating
AllMusic	3.5/5 stars
Clash	7/10
DIY	4/5 stars
Pitchfork	6.3/10
Slant Magazine	4/5 stars

Us is the second studio album by American singer-songwriter and producer Empress Of, released on October 19, 2018 via XL Recordings and Terrible Records. The album was preceded by the double A-side single "Trust Me Baby / In Dreams", released on April 11, 2018, and three promotional singles: "When I'm with Him", released on August 22; "Love for Me", released on September 24; and "I Don't Even Smoke Weed", released on October 17.

"When I'm with Him" is part of the soundtrack of eFootball PES 2020.

== Track listing ==
All tracks are written by Lorely Rodriguez unless otherwise specified.

No.	Title	Writer(s)	Length
1.	"Everything to Me"		2:47
2.	"Just the Same"		3:41
3.	"Trust Me Baby"		3:18
4.	"Love for Me"		3:19
5.	"I Don't Even Smoke Weed"		3:26
6.	"Timberlands"	Lorely Rodriguez; Georgia Barnes	3:21
7.	"I've Got Love"		3:17
8.	"All for Nothing"	Rodriguez; Andrew Sarlo	3:12
9.	"When I'm with Him"	Dan Nigro; Rodriguez	3:13
10.	"Again"		3:01
