= Mawle =

Mawle is a surname. Notable people with the surname include:

- Henry Mawle (1871–1943), British cricketer
- Joseph Mawle (born 1974), British actor
- Norman Mawle (1897–1971), British World War I flying ace

== See also ==
- Male (surname)
- Mawe (disambiguation)
- Pawle
