= Feminine ending =

Feminine ending, in grammatical gender, is the final syllable or suffixed letters that mark words as feminine.

Feminine ending may also refer to:

- Feminine ending, in meter, a line of verse that ends with an unstressed syllable. See Masculine and feminine endings
- Feminine ending or feminine cadence, a term in music theory for a phrase or movement that ends in an unstressed note or weak cadence
- Feminine Endings, a 1991 feminist critique by musicologist Susan McClary
- A Feminine Ending, a 2008 play by Sarah Treem
- Feminine Endings, a 2008 short novel by Neil Gaiman

== See also ==
- Feminine (disambiguation)
- Feminine rhyme
