= Go to Hell (Empress Of song) =

Single by Empress Of
- Released: July 12, 2017
- Recorded: 2017
- Genre: Synth pop; indie pop; art pop
- Length: 3:10
- Label: Terrible
- Songwriter(s): Lorely Rodriguez, Caroline Polachek
- Producer(s): Lorely Rodriguez

Empress Of singles chronology
"Woman Is A Word" (2016)	"Go to Hell" (2017)	"Trust Me Baby / In Dreams" (2018)

"Go to Hell" is a song by American singer Empress Of. The track was co-written with Caroline Polachek in Echo Park, Los Angeles, and produced solely by Rodriguez. It was digitally released as a single on July 12, 2017, through Terrible Records.

Lyrically, the song is about an incident that negatively affected Rodriguez but now causes her to "laugh with joy" every time she hears it. Rodriguez addresses her detractors over a tropical beat with "gauzy, tinkling synths" that is accentuated by handclaps.

== Critical reception ==
Eugenie Johnson of DIY gave it a positive review, stating that, "as a statement of intent and a declaration of self-confidence and empowerment, it doesn’t get much stronger than this." In writing for Pitchfork, Quinn Moreland praises Rodriguez in recognizing her own ability, calling the song "a universal reminder that the transformation of pain into satisfaction may not be immediate, but once the wounds scab over, the freedom calls for celebration." The Fader's Leah Mandel opined it as "best kind of kiss-off—one that takes heartbreak and anger and twists it into self-empowerment and pop gold."
