= Masc =

Masc or MASc may refer to:

- Masc (band), a South Korean boy band
- "Masc" (song), by Doja Cat
- Masc. ('masculine') as an abbreviation used in the context of grammatical gender
- Masculinity, or having male characteristics
- Master of Applied Science (MASc), a kind of academic degree
- Masc (film), a British drama

== See also ==
- Masculine (disambiguation)
