= Male and Female (disambiguation) =

Male and Female is a 1919 silent film directed by Cecil B. DeMille.

Male and Female may also refer to:

- Male and Female: A Study of the Sexes in a Changing World, a 1949 book by Margaret Mead

== See also ==
- Biological sex, male and female collectively
- Gender, male and female collectively
- Hermaphrodite, both male and female
- Intersex, both male and female
- Dioecious, having both male and female, instead of one or the other or neither
- Male
- Female
- Gender of connectors and fasteners
- XY sex-determination system
- Male (disambiguation)
- Female (disambiguation)
