= Female (disambiguation) =

Female is the biological sex of an ovum-producing organism.

Female may also refer to:

== Gender ==
- Female, the gender of women and girls
  - Woman, a female adult
  - Girl, a young female person, usually a child or adolescent
  - Femininity, attributes associated with women and girls

== Arts and entertainment ==
- Female (novel), a 1933 novel by Donald Henderson Clarke
- Female (1933 film), starring Ruth Chatterton
- Female (2005 film), a Japanese film compilation
- Female (song), 2017, by Keith Urban
- "Female", a poem by Patti Smith from her 1972 book Seventh Heaven
- The Female (The Boys), fictional character

== Other uses ==
- Feminine gender, a grammatical class of nouns in many languages
- Female connector, in hardware and electronics, a type of connector, often but not always a "jack"

== See also ==
- Male (disambiguation)
- Male and Female (disambiguation)
- Masculine (disambiguation)
- Feminine (disambiguation)
