= Save Me (Empress Of EP) =

EP by Empress Of
- Released: June 24, 2022
- Genre: electronic; future house; synth-pop; dance-pop; dream pop; avant-pop
- Label: Major Arcana
- Producer: Lorely Rodriguez; BJ Burton; Johan Lennox

Empress Of chronology
I'm Your Empress Of (2020)	Save Me (2022)	For Your Consideration (2024)

Singles from Save Me
- 1. "Save Me" Released: April 8, 2022; 2. "Dance For You" Released: May 25, 2022; 3. "Turn the Table" Released: June 23, 2022

Save Me is the third EP by Honduran-American singer-songwriter and producer, Empress Of released June 24, 2022 via her independent label, Major Arcana. The EP was preceded by three singles, Save Me, Dance For You and Turn the Table with Jim-E Stack released April 8, May 25, and June 23, 2022, respectively.

== Critical reception ==
Save Me was favourably received upon its release. Fran Gonzalez of Madrid-based dod Magazine, offered a fairly positive review opining it as "a collection of fierce and scathing tracks where [Rodriguez] does not hesitate to bring out her most sexual side" and further praising Rodriguez's uncanny songwriting and production on the latter half of the EP, stating "The last blows of Save Me exhibit a treatment of electronics quite unusual to date in Rodriguez's range of resources, revealing us from more exotic and calm flashes of 'Kept Up' to more syncopated and dark textures of 'Cry for Help'".

Writing for Pitchfork, Hannah Jocelyn offered a more reserved and mixed review stating, "Save Me represents an opportunity to consolidate [Rodriguez's] sound while exploring less intense territory". Jocelyn further highlights the single, "Dance for You" as "the EP's most accomplished composition" but criticized certain repetitive song structures and lyrical motifs saying, "Almost every song climaxes with a section alternating between a synth riff and a title drop—each effective on their own, but noticeable when clumped together."

== Track listing ==
No.	Title	Writer(s)	Producer(s)	Length
1.	"Save Me"	Lorely Rodriguez; BJ Burton; Johan Lennox	Empress Of; Burton; Lennox	3:18
2.	"Dance for You"	Rodriguez; Burton	Empress Of; Burton	3:21
3.	"Turn the Table" (featuring Jim-E Stack)	Rodriguez; James Harmon Stack	Empress Of	2:51
4.	"Kept Up"	Rodriguez	Empress Of	2:37
5.	"Cry for Help"	Rodriguez; Andy Sennett; John Rocca	Empress Of	2:50
Total length:				14:59

=== Notes ===
- "Cry for Help" contains a sample of "Melodies of Love", written by John Rocca and Andy Sennett, as performed by Pink Rhythm.

== Personnel ==
- Lorely Rodriguez – vocals, synthesizer, production, writing
- BJ Burton – production, writing (track 1,2)
- Johan Lenox – production, string arrangements (track 1)
- Yasmeen Al-Mazeedi – violin, orchestra (track 1)
- John Rocca – writing (track 5)
- Andy Sennett – writing (track 5)
- Jim-E Stack – writing (track 3)

Technical

- Robin Schmidt - mastering
- Geoff Swan – mixing
- Alexa Hernandez - makeup
- Chris Horan - styling
- Natalia Mantini – cover photo
- Hair by Mya - hair
