= Kiss Me (Empress Of song) =

2023 song by Empress Of

Single by Empress Of featuring Rina Sawayama

from the album For Your Consideration
- Released: September 25, 2023
- Recorded: 2022
- Length: 3:21
- Label: Major Arcana; Giant Music
- Songwriter(s): Lorely Rodriguez; Rina Sawayama; BJ Burton; Kyle Shearer; Nate Campany
- Producer(s): Valley Girl

Empress Of singles chronology
"Turn The Table" (2022)	"Kiss Me" (2023)	"Femenine" (2023)

Rina Sawayama singles chronology
"Eve, Psyche & the Bluebeard's Wife" (2023)	"Kiss Me" (2023)	"I'm Free" (2024)

"Kiss Me" is a song by Honduran-American singer-songwriter Empress Of featuring Japanese singer Rina Sawayama. It was released on September 25, 2023, as the lead single from the former's fourth studio album For Your Consideration via her independent label Major Arcana and American independent label Giant Music.

It premiered as the "Hottest Record" on Clara Amfo's BBC Radio 1's Future Sounds radio program. The song debuted live during a headline performance at the Lower Third in London, England on August 22, 2023.

"Kiss Me" is also notable as Rodriguez's first release not to feature any of her own music production. Instead, it was produced and co-written by American music producers and songwriters Valley Girl with additional writing by long-time collaborator BJ Burton.

== Music video ==
The music video, directed by India Rose Harris features stylized shots of Rodriguez and Sawayama performing the song intercut between two locations, a countryside glade dressed as angels to a more sultry atmosphere within a dreamy ballroom. The video was filmed in the United Kingdom.
