= I'm Your Empress Of =

Studio album by Empress Of
- Released: April 3, 2020
- Genres: Avant-pop; dance-pop; dream pop; R&B
- Length: 33:21
- Labels: Terrible; XL
- Producers: Lorely Rodriguez; BJ Burton (exec.); Jim-E Stack; Mikey Freedom Hart

Empress Of chronology
Us (2018)	I'm Your Empress Of (2020)	Save Me (2022)

Singles from I'm Your Empress Of
- 1. "Give Me Another Chance" Released: March 3, 2020; 2. "Love Is a Drug" Released: April 3, 2020

Professional ratings
Aggregate scores
Source	Rating
AnyDecentMusic?	7.9/10
Metacritic	82/100
Review scores
Source	Rating
AllMusic	3.5/5 stars
Beats Per Minute	80%
Dork	4/5 stars
Exclaim!	8/10
Gigwise	8/10
The Independent	5/5 stars
The Line of Best Fit	8/10
NME	5/5 stars
Paste	8.2/10
Pitchfork	7.4/10

I'm Your Empress Of is the third studio album by American singer-songwriter and producer Empress Of, released via Terrible Records and XL Recordings on April 3, 2020. The album's first single "Give Me Another Chance" premiered on March 3, 2020, via Zane Lowe's Beats 1 radio show.

== Composition ==
On her third album, Empress Of crafts "breathtaking" avant-pop, "energetic" dance-pop, dream pop, and "funky" R&B. It also shows a Chicago house-inspired wonky pop style.

== Track listing ==
All tracks written by Empress Of, except for "Hold Me Like Water", written alongside Mikey "Ex Reyes" Hart.

I'm Your Empress Of
No.	Title	Producer(s)	Length
1.	"I'm Your Empress Of"	Empress Of; BJ Burton	1:45
2.	"Bit of Rain"	Empress Of; Burton	3:30
3.	"Void"	Empress Of; Burton	3:09
4.	"Love Is a Drug"	Empress Of; Burton	2:40
5.	"U Give It Up"	Burton; Jim-E Stack	3:29
6.	"Should've"	Empress Of; Burton	2:20
7.	"Give Me Another Chance"	Empress Of; Burton	2:40
8.	"What's the Point"	Empress Of; Burton	2:28
9.	"Maybe This Time"	Empress Of; Burton	2:56
10.	"Not the One"	Empress Of; Burton	3:11
11.	"Hold Me Like Water"	Burton; Ex Reyes	2:54
12.	"Awful"	Empress Of; Burton	2:21
