= Pawle =

Pawle may refer to:

- James and Janet Pawle, characters in Village of the Damned, a 1960 British science fiction film
- John Pawle (1915–2010), English sportsman, stockbroker, and painter
- Lennox Pawle (1872–1936), English stage and film actor

== See also ==
- Mawle
