= Horrid Red =

US musical group

- Origin: San Francisco, California, U.S.
- Genres: Post-punk; new wave; dark wave
- Years active: 2010 –present
- Labels: Terrible
- Members: Bunker Wolf; Edmund Xavier; Clay Ruby

Horrid Red is a rock band formed in 2010 in San Francisco, California. It features German vocalist Bunker Wolf, as well as instrumentalists Edmund Xavier and Clay Ruby. The band has released four studio albums: Celestial Joy (2011), Nightly Wreaths (2012), Gold of Days (2014), and Radiant Life (2020).

Described as a post-punk and dark wave band, Horrid Red "mixes dark new-wave with a pop sensibility," incorporating a "noirish krautrock and fuzz-wreathed songcraft." The band cites Cabaret Voltaire, Savage Republic, The Fall, Public Image Ltd. and Can as influences. The band's lyrics are sung in German.

== Members ==
- Bunker Wolf - vocals
- Edmund Xavier - instruments
- Clay Ruby - instruments

== Discography ==
Studio albums

- Celestial Joy (2011)
- Nightly Wreaths (2012)
- Gold of Days (2014)
- Radiant Life (2020)

EPs

- Empty Lungs (2010)
- Pink Flowers (2011)
- Silent Party (2011)
- Banquet in Blue (2012)
- Who Made the World (2013)
