= Me (Empress Of album) =

Studio album by Empress Of
- Released: September 11, 2015
- Genres: Electropop, UK garage, alternative pop, house, dream pop
- Labels: Terrible; XL
- Producer: Lorely Rodriguez

Empress Of chronology
| Systems (2013) | Me (2015) | Us (2018) |

Singles from Me
- 1. "Water Water" Released: April 14, 2015; 2. "Kitty Kat" Released: July 20, 2015; 3. "How Do You Do It" Released: September 2, 2015; 4. "Standard" Released: September 3, 2015

Me is the debut studio album by American singer and songwriter Lorely Rodriguez, known professionally as Empress Of. It was released on September 11, 2015, by XL Recordings and Terrible Records. Finding her residence of New York stifling to her creative process, Rodriguez embarked on a solo writing retreat to Mexico which granted her the introspection she was seeking. Work on the album continued for a further two years, culminating in a direct approach to her lyrics and production.

Me is noted for its electronic and alternative R&B sound, a departure from the "hazy, dreamy" style that previously characterized her music. The album received critical acclaim from contemporary music reviewers, who applauded Rodriguez's revelatory themes and immediate, energetic nature of her music; Me was further spotlighted in several year-end lists. Four singles preceded the album's release: "Water Water", "Kitty Kat", "How Do You Do It" and "Standard". Rodriguez embarked on the Me & You Tour in late 2015 with Abra in support of the album.

== Background ==
In 2012, Lorely Rodriguez began anonymously uploading her first recordings onto YouTube: a collection of minute-long snippets designated with a single color. These demos, dubbed Colorminutes, were produced day-to-day as an exercise for Rodriguez to hone her technical proficiency and creative discipline. Upon adopting the stage name Empress Of, a few became the basis for her first release "Champagne", which garnered the attention of Terrible Records. She released her first EP Systems through the label in April 2013 and later signed a joint deal with XL Recordings for her debut studio album. The album's opener, "Everything is You", was written subsequently after on a dilapidated piano that her Brooklyn apartment housed.

Rodriguez found herself with writer's block after initial recording sessions for Me, which took place in a Williamsburg studio: "When I listen to the demos I made [there], they sound like a windowless room in a basement in New York,"–her residence at the time–"I didn't want to tour [that]. I wanted to tour "me," because I will always be the person I am, but that windowless room in a basement was only a moment in my life."

Much of the discarded material fixated on critiquing "capitalism, and Starbucks, and condos. And how every apartment has rats," further reiterating her ambivalence against touring a record about "hating New York". Rodriguez was encouraged by her manager to leave the city, and she began contacting friends over her predicament, to which one offered his parents' empty vacation house in Mexico. Rodriguez left for the writing retreat in December 2013, leaving behind four jobs as a nanny and music teacher, to the secluded village of Valle de Bravo on Lake Avándaro. She exited a relationship right before her trip, though the lack of an internet connection left her with only the music on her iTunes: a mix that her ex-boyfriend sent for Christmas that included Aphex Twin, Chet Baker and Animal Collective.

== Writing and development ==
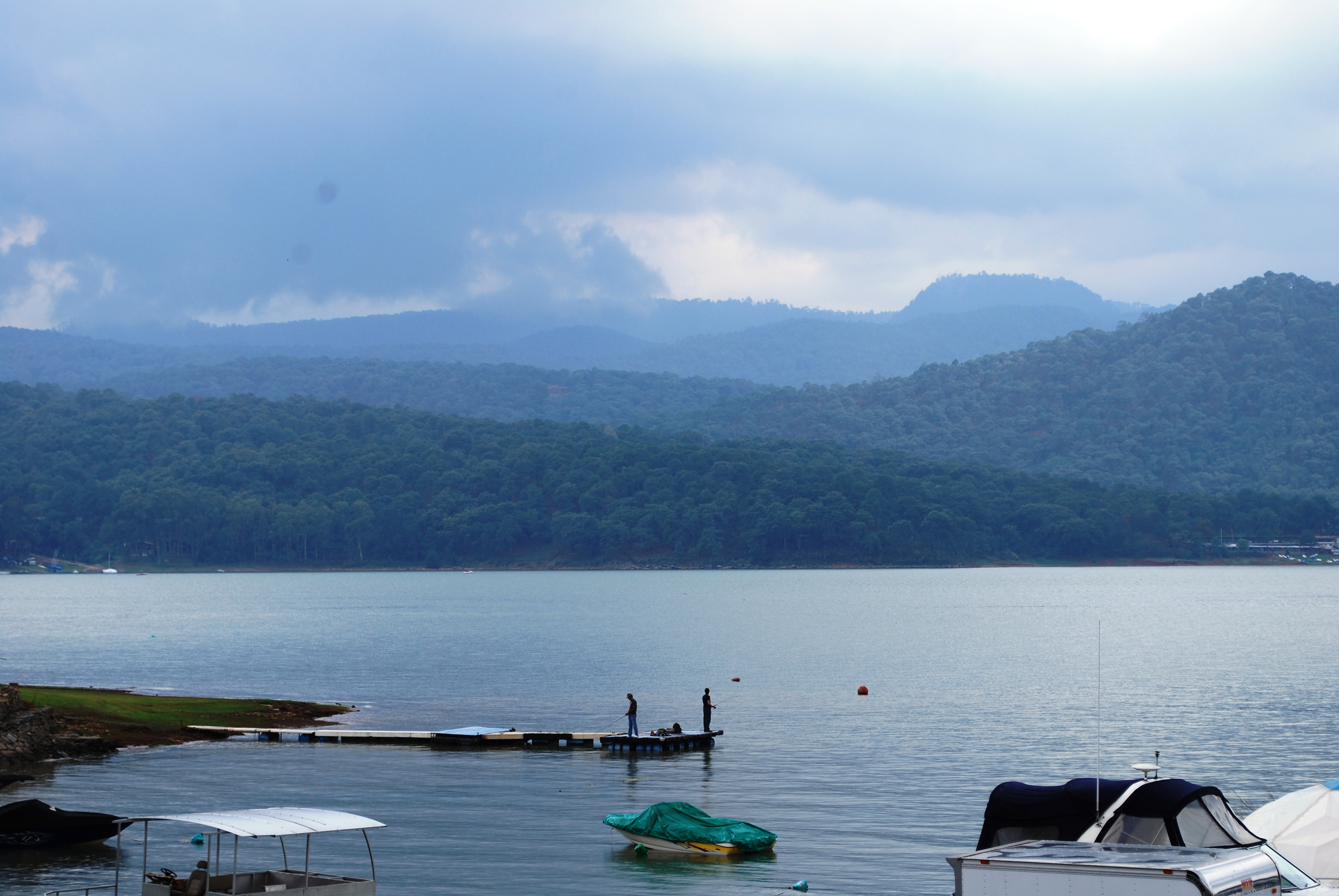
Rodriguez initially produced Me with Lake Avándaro in view.

Rodriguez credits "driving [herself] crazy" as making the album's production possible. Me was written during Valle de Bravo's low season for tourism, which induced a state of paranoia due to the isolation. This condition was further exacerbated by the pressure of contractual obligations, causing her to feel like she was "writing against the clock" during the retreat. Being detached from her everyday life in New York made for a perspective that "highlighted everything" and brought clarity to themes she wanted to explore, which she compared to hypnotism: "[W]hen I turned the mic on, a lot of what I said was much more direct. [...] I was [hypnotized] once and I got so in a daze that my subconscious was talking. Someone would ask me a question and this person in me would just spit something out. [...] So writing without distractions was like that, it just came out. To me it was a little shocking but also really comforting."

Me encompasses a "wide range of emotions" as Rodriguez sought to hone her songwriting craft and "get [her] point across through words", angling her focus away from purely "textures and sounds." She stated that the record's biggest takeaway is the idea that "it's hard to be comfortable with yourself […] When you're in New York there are so many distractions, there are so many people you can go to and forget that you have these insecurities." Rodriguez portrays Me as a "selfish" record, centered around reflection, growth and self-prioritization. The album begins with "Everything is You", which expresses a consuming "uncertainty" when one "[questions their] independence within a relationship."

"I wanted the first track to be about being in love and about giving. But it's like, where's the 'me' in that? The rest of the record is about me finding myself. When you love someone so much that you don't even know who you are, that can be a problem—and I had that problem."

Producing entirely on her laptop, Rodriguez worked for ten hours a day; filling white boards and composition notebooks with elaborate to-do lists. "Need Myself" was the first song to be written on the retreat, sang over a beat made minutes before, "almost like a meditation" in trying to deal with her solitude. The song is lyrically about picking apart an "old toxic relationship with an unresponsive partner". "Threat" was written after developing a fear of intruders by the third week, causing her to relocate her studio bedside from its former lakeview window. She began sleeping with a machete under her bed after a "really scary" conversation with the cleaning lady, concerned knowing that Rodriguez was spending time at the vacation house alone.

Rodriguez was visited once during her period of isolation, where she and her friends participated in recreational drug use. Despite feeling like "they had rocketed to another planet", the night ultimately became "parched" and "confusing" due to failure to purchase potable water. The experience would later amalgamate on "Water Water", which was written "furiously" on New Year's Eve and is thematically encircled with the scarcity of water itself. "Standard" further interrogates the implications of privilege and class divide, recounting the poverty she witnessed in Mexico: "I would pass families on the side of the road selling firewood for pennies when a couple of weeks ago I was in N.Y. buying $4 coffee. I put myself in their shoes." Her experience as a struggling artist in New York is reflected in the song: "[N]ot being born super wealthy, being from a working-class family. It was fucking hard. [...] "Standard" [came] out of [seeing] how divided it is. There are almost moments of envy in there, like I wish I had it easy. But then there are moments of 'I know what it means to work for what you want from almost nothing.'"

The album's closer, "Icon", was written about taking adderall in order to finish the album's production. "To Get By" was the final track to be completed for the record, where she reached a breaking point after nitpicking its details back and forth with her manager: "Knowing when to stop working on this record was probably the hardest thing about making it. Working alone, no one is telling you what's good enough or what's finished."

== Recording and composition ==
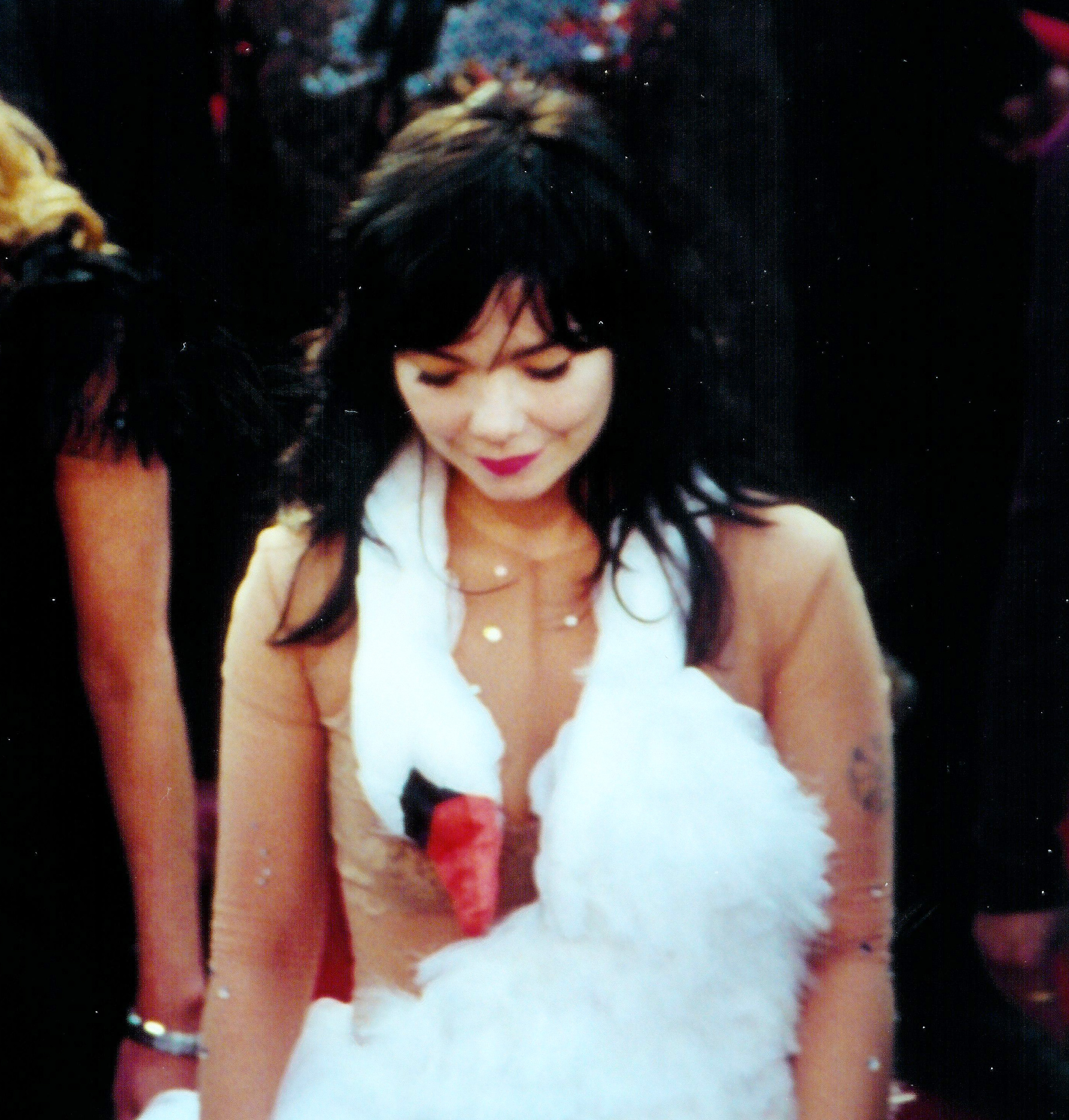
Rodriguez counts Björk as one of her influences, citing broadcasts of her swan dress as initiating her own musical discovery.

Me is a departure from Rodriguez's heavily reverbed approach to her debut EP Systems (2013), which she felt like she was hiding behind: "All of the music I was obsessed with at that time was hazy, hazy New York and hazy emotions, everything was hiding behind a texture. It was really nice but I realized how hard it is to connect with haze. I couldn't connect with an audience when I was drowned in textures." After leaving Mexico in early-2014, Rodriguez spent the next nine months fleshing out the ideas she developed, working between Montreal, New York and Los Angeles. The resulting product amalgamates electronic music and alternative R&B in a minimalist and experimental style.

In writing for The New York Times, Jon Pareles states that "[the tracks] are as clean-lined and skeletal as a blueprint under plexiglass," further complimenting Rodriguez's musical progression: "Empress Of distilled her music, ruthlessly making every sound earn its place and, as a result, making each song more focused and tenacious." Stephen Carlick of Exclaim! noted that Rodriguez "demonstrates her versatility early on" with "Everything is You" and "Water Water": "the former is a sparse and snapping ode to new love, buoyed by hi-hat rolls and cooed gently in her lilting alto; the latter is a pulsing, reverb-splashed anthem".

Because her vocals are "the only organic thing on the record", Rodriguez felt the desire to "bring as much life" into them as she could, which lead to it being recorded at Electric Ladyland Studios: "It was Jimi Hendrix' microphone that he bought in the '60s for his studio! [...] He sang into it, like, his spit is on it. Adele recorded 21 on it. Arcade Fire recorded Reflektor. So it's like…I just wanted that to be very real. Vocals are really important on the record. They're the message. I just wanted to do it—no bullshitting." In an interview with The Deli, Rodriguez revealed that Me was made in Logic Pro with the Apollo Twin Duo interface from Universal Audio, further employing SoundToys plug-ins and the Native Instruments Maschine from which a majority of its bass and drum sounds originate.

== Title and artwork ==
Rodriguez contemplated the album's title for months before settling on Me. She sent potential titles to her manager, emailed as subject lines which were met with dismissal. Her faith in his judgment led her to choosing a title of a subtle nature to reflect the album's message: "Sometimes people have album titles that are so grandiose, magical, mysterious or whatever, but I wanted something simple, direct and personal." It was inspired by Björk's Debut (1993), which Rodriguez calls "brilliant" as she was fond of titles that "mark the beginning of something". Me was picked as the title a month before the record was finalized.

Pitchfork compares the "stark" artwork to that of Horses (1975) by Patti Smith, signifying "lyrically raw" content. The album cover developed from different avenues as Rodriguez did "everything under the sun", including having her head 3D printed. These concepts were rejected as they all "looked like something else and only represented a point in time", later relating to the universality of personal trials: "I know that when I'm older I'll still struggle with some of the things that a 24-year-old woman struggles with. [...] That isn't a 3-D rendered sculpture or some type of pastel, goth thing. It's just a black and white photo that someone took in 15 minutes. I wasn't wearing makeup. I borrowed the shirt." Rodriguez stated that the artwork is about "being nervous about exposing myself", which reflected her emotions at the time of the photoshoot as she did not know the photographer.

== Release ==
Me was preceded by four singles: "Water Water", "Kitty Kat", "How Do You Do It", and "Standard". The album was announced on July 20, 2015, upon the release of the second single "Kitty Kat".

On March 14, 2016, Empress Of released a new single titled "Woman Is a Word". In May 2016, it was revealed that Me would be re-released on cassette with bonus tracks, to be sold on tour in June. The bonus tracks would include "Woman Is a Word", a Spanish version of "Water Water" entitled "Agua Agua", and exclusive new remixes. "Agua Agua" was first shared by Rodriguez via SoundCloud in June 2015.

== Critical reception ==
Professional ratings
Aggregate scores
| Source | Rating |
|---|---|
| Metacritic | 82/100 |
Review scores
| Source | Rating |
| AllMusic | 3.5/5 stars |
| The Guardian | 4/5 stars |
| musicOMH | 4/5 stars |
| The New York Times | Favorable |
| Pitchfork | 8.2/10 |
| Vice (Expert Witness) | (1-star Honorable Mention) |

Pitchfork reviewed the album positively, awarding it Best New Music.

=== Year-end lists ===
| Publication | Accolade | Rank |
|---|---|---|
| Pitchfork | The 50 Best Albums of 2015 | 37 |
| Noisey | The 50 Best Albums of 2015 | 29 |
| Pretty Much Amazing | The 50 Best Albums of 2015 | 20 |
| Under the Radar | Top 100 Albums of 2015 | 74 |
| The Line of Best Fit | The 50 Best Albums of 2015 | N/A |
| Pigeons & Planes | Best Albums of 2015 | 22 |
| The 405 | The 30 Best Albums of 2015 | 22 |
| Gorilla vs. Bear | Albums of 2015 | 30 |
| Time Out New York | The 25 Best Albums of 2015 | 7 |

== Track listing ==
All tracks are written by Lorely Rodriguez.

| No. | Title | Length |
|---|---|---|
| 1. | "Everything Is You" | 3:46 |
| 2. | "Water Water" | 3:41 |
| 3. | "Standard" | 3:39 |
| 4. | "How Do You Do It" | 3:43 |
| 5. | "To Get By" | 2:57 |
| 6. | "Kitty Kat" | 2:25 |
| 7. | "Need Myself" | 4:00 |
| 8. | "Make Up" | 3:40 |
| 9. | "Threat" | 3:27 |
| 10. | "Icon" | 3:34 |

Cassette bonus tracks
| No. | Title | Length |
|---|---|---|
| 11. | "Woman Is a Word" | 3:17 |
| 12. | "Agua Agua" | 3:40 |
| 13. | "How Do You Do It" (Empress Of Remix) | 3:39 |
| 14. | "Icon" (The Range Remix) | 4:17 |

== Charts ==
| Chart (2015) | Peak position |
|---|---|
| US Heatseekers Albums (Billboard) | 9 |
| US Top Dance Albums (Billboard) | 5 |
