= Samantha Nye =

American artist (born 1980)

- Born: 1980 (age 45–46); Hollywood, Florida, U.S.
- Education: School of the Museum of Fine Arts at Tufts; Columbia University School of the Arts
- Employer: Kutztown University of Pennsylvania
- Awards: Guggenheim Fellowship (2023)
- Website: samanthanye.com

Samantha Nye (born 1980) is an American video artist and painter. A 2023 Guggenheim Fellow, her work focuses on body image in elderly women and non-binary people.

== Early life and career ==
Samantha Nye was born in 1980 in Hollywood, Florida, and raised in Miami, where she was "steeped in a South Beach aesthetic". She originally worked as a child model and actor, and she once unsuccessfully auditioned for The All-New Mickey Mouse Club by performing the Rick Astley song "Never Gonna Give You Up". She recalled creating early works focused on "goddess" imagery in high school, reflecting an early interest in representations of the body and identity.

She studied at the School of the Museum of Fine Arts at Tufts, where she obtained a BFA in 2010. In 2018, she obtained her MFA in painting from Columbia University School of the Arts. During her early artistic development, Nye became interested in figurative painting and the representation of the human body, which would later become central to her work. Her time at the School of the Museum of Fine Arts at Tufts University emphasized interdisciplinary approaches, allowing her to work across painting, video, and installation. While completing her MFA at Columbia University, Nye further developed narrative-driven work that explored identity, relationships, and embodied experience, themes that continue throughout her artistic practice.

== Art career ==
In 2013, she started her "Visual Pleasure/Jukebox Cinema" series of scopitone video installations, later using some of them for her master's thesis. In March 2021, she had her first solo show at the Museum of Fine Arts, Boston: a nightclub-like installation called My Heart's in a Whirl where a screen plays remakes of scopitone videos featuring nonbinary and trans people and elderly women. Boston Art Review called My Heart’s in a Whirl one of their "Favorite Art Happenings of 2021".

Her video Army of Love, which explores themes of intimacy and care within marginalized communities, was featured in the 2022 Dutch exhibition Come Alive, The Power of Pleasure. In 2023, she was awarded a Guggenheim Fellowship in Film and Video. In November 2024, the New Yorker reported that for her newest video project, she was doing a "lesbian takeover" of the Belvedere Guest House for Men in Cherry Grove, New York; titled Femininity, it required a casting call involving a few dozen middle-aged to elderly queer women.

In 2019, she started a series of paintings called Attractive People, Doing Attractive Things in Attractive Places—Double Your Pleasure—Double Your Pleasure; named after Slim Aarons' remark about his own photographs, they are inspired by Aarons' poolside photographs and depict elderly nude queer women. She also worked with Todd Stong for the 2025 joint exhibition Split Fountain, where she did three oil paintings of nude women. Nye is lesbian. She works at Kutztown University of Pennsylvania as an assistant professor of art and design.

== Themes and style ==
Nye’s work focuses on representations of the body, particularly in relation to aging, gender, and queer identity. Her practice often centers on elderly women and non-binary individuals, groups that are frequently underrepresented in visual culture.

Her work draws on personal experiences, including relationships with older women in her community, which inform her interest in intimacy, care, and intergenerational connection.

Through both painting and video, she challenges conventional ideas of beauty and desirability by presenting bodies in non-idealized and emotionally complex ways.

== Selected works ==
- My Heart’s in a Whirl (2021)
- Army of Love (video)
- Femininity (video project)
- Attractive People, Doing Attractive Things in Attractive Places—Double Your Pleasure—Double Your Pleasure (painting series, 2019–)
- Split Fountain (with Todd Stong, 2025)

== Personal life ==
Nye is based in Philadelphia, where she continues her artistic practice and teaching. Her identity as a lesbian has been discussed in relation to her artistic practice, particularly in her focus on queer relationships and representation.
