= Male, Vikramgad =

Village in Maharashtra

Male
- village
- Location in Maharashtra, India Male (India)
- Coordinates: 19.6961724°N 73.0954953°E
- Country: India
- State: Maharashtra
- District: Palghar
- Taluka: Vikramgad
- Elevation: 51 m (167 ft)

Population (2011)
  - Total: 886
- Time zone: UTC+5:30 (IST)
- 2011 census code: 551841

Male is a village in the Palghar district of Maharashtra, India. It is located in the Vikramgad taluka.

== Demographics ==
According to the 2011 census of India, Male has 194 households. The effective literacy rate (i.e. the literacy rate of population excluding children aged 6 and below) is 73.24%.

Demographics (2011 Census)
	Total	Male	Female
Population	886	425	461
Children aged below 6 years	120	62	58
Scheduled caste	0	0	0
Scheduled tribe	652	310	342
Literates	561	289	272
Workers (all)	456	244	212
Main workers (total)	268	161	107
Main workers: Cultivators	143	81	62
Main workers: Agricultural labourers	74	43	31
Main workers: Household industry workers	1	0	1
Main workers: Other	50	37	13
Marginal workers (total)	188	83	105
Marginal workers: Cultivators	64	29	35
Marginal workers: Agricultural labourers	76	29	47
Marginal workers: Household industry workers	4	2	2
Marginal workers: Others	44	23	21
Non-workers	430	181	249
