= Blasting Through the Speakers =

Single by Empress Of
- Released: October 2, 2025
- Recorded: 2025
- Genre: electronic, dance-pop, synth-pop, club, future house
- Length: 2:46
- Label: Major Arcana; Giant Music
- Songwriters: Lorely Rodriguez; Mike Sabath
- Producers: Rodriguez, Sabath

Empress Of singles chronology
"Little Secret" (2025)	"Blasting Through the Speakers" (2025)

"Blasting Through the Speakers" is a song by Honduran-American musical artist, Empress Of, released on October 2, 2025, via her independent imprint, Major Arcana and American independent label, Giant Music.

The single coincided ahead of her appearance as the opening act for New Zealand singer, Lorde during the North American portion of her Ultrasound World Tour throughout October 2025, alongside main support, British musical artists, The Japanese House and Blood Orange on select dates.

According to reports, the song made its live debut several months prior, during a performance at The Getty Center in July 2025. The music video, directed by film producer and photographer, Hex Hudosh, was released a few weeks later on October 20, 2025.

== Background ==
Written and produced by Rodriguez and American songwriter, Mike Sabath, Blasting Through the Speakers was created after an extended break from songwriting by Rodriguez in 2025, following the Southern California wildfires, which impacted and displaced over 150,000 residents within the Greater Los Angeles area and San Diego County at the beginning of that year in January.

The loss of her childhood family home to the Eaton Fire in Altadena, would cause Rodriguez to shift her focus from music and prioritize helping her family and assist in local community relief efforts for those effected.

In the single's press release, Rodriguez stated "After the fires in Altadena, I couldn’t make music for some time. I was afraid to go there. When I made this song, it felt like music was a friend I hadn’t talked to in a while, but was always there to pick up the phone".
