= Femininity (film) =

2019 Iranian documentary film directed by Mohsen Ostad Ali

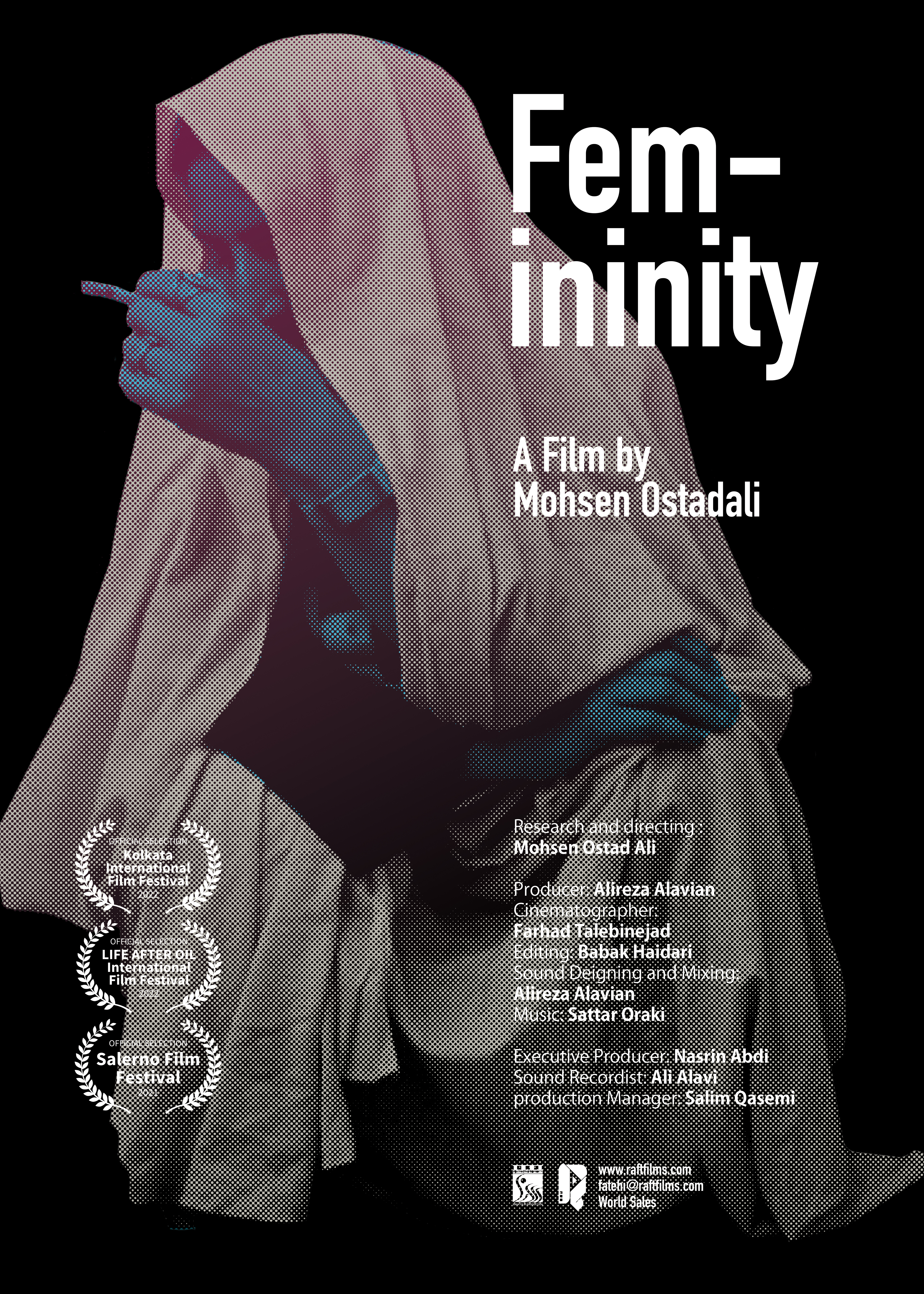
- Official poster
- Persian: زنانگی
- Directed by: Mohsen Ostad Ali
- Written by: Mohsen Ostad Ali
- Produced by: Alireza Alavian
- Cinematography: Farhad Talebinezhad
- Edited by: Babak Heidari
- Music by: Sattar Oraki
- Production company: Sana Production
- Distributed by: Raft Films
- Release date: 19 December 2019 (Cinéma Vérité)
- Running time: 84 minutes
- Country: Iran
- Language: Persian

Femininity (Persian: زنانگی, romanized: Zananegi); is a 2019 Iranian feature documentary film written and directed by Mohsen Ostad Ali and produced by Ostad Ali and Alireza Alavian under the Sana Production banner. The film is set in Tehran's only night shelter for homeless women and follows five residents—Sanaz, Saeedeh, Tala, Ladan, and Behesht—as they struggle to rebuild their lives amid trauma, addiction, and social stigma. It has been described by critics as an intimate, humanistic portrayal of marginalized women in Iran, focusing on resilience and solidarity.

== Synopsis ==
Femininity takes place in a women's night shelter in southern Tehran, the only such center open to homeless women in the city. The film follows five women—Sanaz, Saeedeh, Tala, Ladan, and Behesht—each with a distinct story, but united by their shared space and desire for change. Through a raw, observational style, Ostad Ali explores their attempts to overcome past abuse, drug addiction, and social exclusion, revealing moments of empathy and quiet transformation.

== Production ==
The documentary was written, directed, and produced by Sana Production. Cinematography was by Farhad Talebinezhad, editing by Babak Heidari, and the original score composed by Sattar Oraki. Sound mixing was handled by Alireza Alavian. International distribution is managed by Raft Films.

== Festivals and awards ==
Femininity premiered at the Cinéma Vérité in Tehran in December 2019, where it won the Special Jury Prize. It later screened at several international festivals, including:

Festival	Year	Country	Category / Award	Recipient(s)	Result
Cinéma Vérité	2019	Iran	Special Jury Prize	Mohsen Ostad Ali	Won
Salerno Film Festival	2021	Italy	Best Documentary	Mohsen Ostad Ali	Nominated
Kolkata International Film Festival	2022	India	Golden Royal Bengal Tiger Award – Best Film	Mohsen Ostad Ali	Nominated
Life After Oil International Film Festival	2022	Italy	Valentina Pedicini Award – Best Human Rights Feature	Mohsen Ostad Ali	Won
Regards d’Iran Festival	2023	France	Silver Jury Prize	Mohsen Ostad Ali	Won

== Reception ==
Festival catalogs and international reviewers praised the film for its empathetic treatment of marginalized subjects and minimalist visual style. Asian Movie Pulse highlighted its “humanistic power and quiet emotional rhythm,” while Iranian critics cited it as one of the most significant independent documentaries of the decade.
