= Thoughts Are Thought =

Studio album by Swift
- Released: 1999
- Genre: Nu metal, alternative metal
- Length: 41:08
- Label: Blackbird Productions; Tribunal Records
- Producer: Jamie King

Swift chronology
Thoughts Are Thought (1999)	Waging War (2002)

Thoughts Are Thought is the debut album by American nu metal band Swift, released in 1999 on Blackbird Productions, and was rereleased in 2003 through Tribunal Records. It was re-released with bonus content on an enhanced CD featuring the video for the song "Titanic".

The album was released on vinyl for the first time in 2024.

== Track listing ==
1. "Diamond" – 4:27
2. "Titanic" – 3:38
3. "Younge" – 3:32
4. "Perhaps" – 3:36
5. "Why" – 3:23
6. "Swell Guy" – 3:12
7. "Whack It" – 3:20
8. "Feminine" – 3:45
9. "Enjoy the Silence" (Depeche Mode Cover) – 12:02

== Credits ==
- Gary Forsyth - vocals
- Mikey Gentle - guitar
- Billy Deal - bass
- Jamie King - drums
