= Male language =

Male language is the name of two unrelated languages:

- Male language (Ethiopia), an Omotic language spoken in southern Ethiopia
- Male language (Papua New Guinea), a Madang language
- Malê language, also known as Hote
- Malé dialect of Maldivian
