= Oyinda =

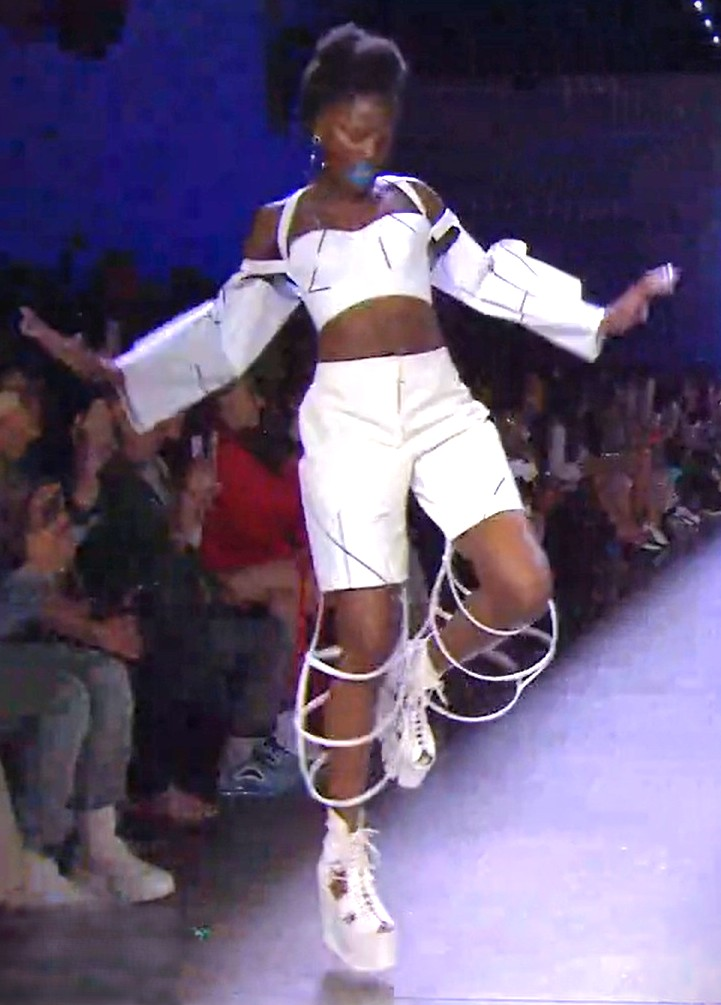
- Oyinda dances on the New York Fashion Week 2020 runway, modeling for Chromat

Background information
- Origin: London, England
- Genres: R&B; electronic soul
- Occupations: Singer; songwriter; record producer
- Instruments: Vocals; piano
- Years active: 2014–present
- Website: oyinda.com

Oyinda is an English singer, songwriter and record producer, based in New York City. According to Clash, she "specialises in emotive, husky, down beat pop music. There's an R&B side to her delivery, with Oyinda seeming to pour her being into each word." Her first two singles, "Rush of You" and "What Still Remains", were released in 2014. Rolling Stone named her one of Lollapalooza's "50 Must-See Acts" in 2014, calling her "R&B's best kept secret."

== Education ==
Oyinda earned a degree from Berklee College of Music in 2013.

== Music career ==
=== 2014: "Rush of You" ===
Released early in 2014 and digitally on 24 July 2014, Oyinda's debut single was "Rush of You". Oyinda both produced and handled vocals. About "Rush of You", The 405 wrote, "The plush, electro sequenced track bridges delicate harmonies and deft hypnotic production akin to a more poppy version of Young Fathers." The magazine DIY wrote that the single consists of "track circuits barely-there, showy guitar solos and looped, flickering vocals on a journey that's led by thumping piano notes (think Massive Attack with an even greater freedom to roam) and the Londoner's glue-like vocals. They piece together a heady mix of drifting ideas... This song is devoted to her masterful sense of control."

=== 2014: "What Still Remains" ===
"The self-produced 'What Still Remains' is a ballad that drags its feet over the debris of the broken relationship, singing mournfully... as it picks it way through gravelly distortion and fragments of piano. Right where you think Oyinda's going to dive headfirst into an anthemic chorus, she reels back, letting a wash of strings take over as she hushes her way through the hook, and leaving you with the feeling there's so much more to come."
—Abeano

Her second single, "What Still Remains", was released on 9 April 2014. Clash described her vocal delivery as "a devastating performance... a hushed, moody vocal take matched against a gossamer arrangement."

The single was released again in September 2014. Pigeons and Planes called the track a "blend of string instruments and pulsating electronic elements similar to bringing together the old world with the new—paired with her nostalgia-drenched vocals." DIY wrote that "Beyond synth sobs and fatal chimes, there's a simple but affecting string line breaking out in the background.This being her second track to date, the Nigerian singer's already proving a dab hand at making emotionally-led pop sound like something vital, not just an exercise in expression."

=== 2014: Lollapalooza ===
Her first significant gig was at Lollapalooza on 3 August 2014, where she was an opening act in Chicago. Rolling Stone named her one of Lollapalooza's "50 Must-See Acts", calling her "R&B's best kept secret."

== Musical style ==
Oyinda's music has been described as R&B and electronic soul. Clash wrote that she "specialises in emotive, husky, down beat pop music. There's an R&B side to her delivery, with Oyinda seeming to pour her being into each word."

== Discography ==
=== Extended plays ===
| Title | Details |
|---|---|
| Before the Fall | Released: 14 November 2014; Label: Self-released; Format: Digital download |
| Restless Minds | Released: 10 June 2016; Label: Blood & Honey; Format: Digital download |
| Oyinda EP | Released: 28 November 2016; Label: Turntable Kitchen; Format: 7" |

=== Singles ===
| Title | Year | Album |
|---|---|---|
| "Rush of You" | 2014 | Before the Fall |
| "What Still Remains" | 2014 | Before the Fall |
| "The Devil's Gonna Keep Me" | 2014 | Before the Fall |
| "Never Enough" | 2016 | Restless Minds |
| "Serpentine" | 2017 | Restless Minds |
| "Flatline" | 2017 | Restless Minds |
