= Q Marsden =

American rapper

- Born: Q Marsden; Broward County, Florida, U.S.
- Genres: R&B; reggae; soul; acoustic pop
- Occupations: Singer; record producer; songwriter
- Years active: 2018–present
- Label: Columbia
- Father: Steven Marsden

Q Steven Marsden, known mononymously as Q, is an American singer and record producer from Broward County, Florida.

== Early life ==
His father, legendary Jamaican dancehall producer Steven Marsden, gave him the first name Q wanting to give his son a unique name believing that he was destined for greatness. During his childhood, Marsden sang in a church choir and visited his father at a recording studio.

== Career ==
In March 2018, Q released a compilation of short songs entitled Thoughts. This was followed in August 2019, by his debut album titled Forest Green which contained elements from soul and acoustic pop. In June 2021, he released the "Director's Cut" edition of his The Shave Experiment album which included five new tracks.

2023 saw the release of his sophomore album Soul,PRESENT, followed by the EP Hello, Everyday Changes. In August of 2026, he released his 4th full-length album "DO YOU SEE ME?".

== Discography ==
Albums

- Forest Green (2019)
- Soul,PRESENT (2023)
- DO YOU SEE ME? (2026)

Deluxe albums

- The Shave Experiment (Director's Cut) (2021)

Mixtapes

- 10 songs (2025)

EPs

- The Shave Experiment (2020)

Compilation albums

- Thoughts (2018)
