= Masculine (disambiguation) =

Masculine or masculinity, normally refer to qualities positively associated with men.

Masculine may also refer to:

- Masculine (grammar), a grammatical gender
- Masculine cadence, a final chord occurring on a strong beat in music
- Masculine rhyme, on a single stressed syllable at the end of a line of poetry

== See also ==
- Male (disambiguation)
- Female (disambiguation)
- Feminine (disambiguation)
