= Femenine =

2023 song by Empress Of

Single by Empress Of

from the album For Your Consideration
- Released: December 1, 2023
- Recorded: 2022
- Genre: House
- Length: 3:03
- Label: Major Arcana; Giant Music
- Songwriters: Lorely Rodriguez; Nick Sylvester; Dee Mad; Ana Manecebo; Nick Sylvester

Empress Of singles chronology
"Kiss Me" (2023)	"Femenine" (2023)	"What's Love" (2024)

"Femenine" is a song by Honduran-American musical artist, Empress Of released December 1, 2023 via her independent label, Major Arcana, and American independent label Giant Music respectively.

"Femenine" was produced and co-written by American music producer and songwriter Nick Sylvester, with additional writing by French producer and DJ Dee Mad and Spanish-American singer/songwriter, Ana Mancebo. The song serves as the second single from Empress Of's fourth studio album, For Your Consideration which was released March 22, 2024.

Emma Madden, writing for Harper's Bazaar, called "Femenine" "a house banger", noting that it "mirrors exactly where [Empress Of is] at—empowered, embodied, wholly self-realized—while manifesting exactly what she wants in a partner: subservience."

The "Femenine" music video was directed by American dancer and choreographer Ryan Heffington.
