= Male (surname) =

Male is a surname. Notable people with the surname include:

- Adri van Male (1910–1990), Dutch football goalkeeper
- Arthur Male (1870–1946), Australian politician
- Carolyn Male (born 1966), Australian politician
- Chris Male (born 1972), English former footballer
- Émile Mâle (1862–1954), French art historian
- Francis Male, Australian rugby league player
- George Male (1910–1998), English footballer
- Inoke Male (born 1963), former Fijian rugby union player and former head coach
- Job Male (1808–1891), first Mayor of Plainfield, New Jersey
- Kitty van Male (born 1988), Dutch field hockey player
- Ossie Male (1893–1975), Welsh rugby union player
- Tim Male (born 1979), British rower
