= Urias (singer) =

Brazilian singer-songwriter (born 1994)

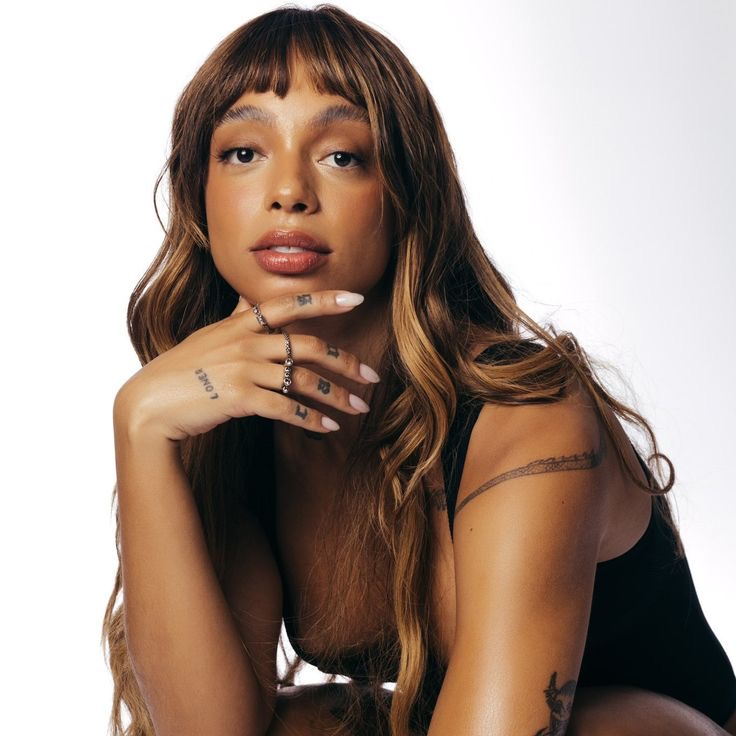
- Urias in 2024

Background information
- Born: Lorena Urias Martins da Silva; May 8, 1994 (age 32)
- Origin: Uberlândia, Minas Gerais, Brazil
- Genres: R&B; pop; electronic
- Occupations: singer; songwriter; musician; model; dancer
- Years active: 2018–present
- Label: Mataderos Projects

Lorena Urias Martins da Silva (born May 8, 1994), better known as Urias, is a Brazilian singer, songwriter, dancer and model. Urias gained national and international recognition in 2019, when she released the single "Diaba".

As a trans woman, she is a strong advocate for the rights of transgender people and the LGBTQIA+ community. As a model, she has participated in São Paulo Fashion Week several times.

== Career ==
Born and raised in Uberlândia, Minas Gerais, Brazil, Urias began to develop her artistic side as a child. Through dance and theatre, she fell in love with fashion and dreamed of a future career in music. While still in her hometown, she became great friends with Brazilian singer and drag queen Pabllo Vittar, many years before gaining notoriety.

In 2018, she started posting covers on her YouTube channel, her first official releases being "Ice Princess", by African-American rapper and singer Azealia Banks, and "Você Me Vira a Cabeça", by Brazilian samba singer Alcione in 2018. Soon after, Urias would sign to Brazilian label and management company Mataderos Projects.

In 2019, Urias released her original debut single "Diaba", whose music video garnered millions of views on YouTube and won Best Art Direction at the Berlin Music Video Awards (BMVA), where she competed with big names such as Dua Lipa and The Chemical Brothers. The song would go on to be a part of her self-titled debut EP released on December 10, 2019.

Her second EP Fúria, Pt. 1 was released on May 28, 2021, after being publicized through social media. This project included the first part of the singer's future debut album of the same name. Five songs were released, along with three music videos.

On January 14, 2022, with eight more tracks, in addition to those on the EP, Urias officially released her debut studio album Fúria, which reached number 1 on the iTunes Brazil album chart. The entire aesthetic of the album would follow the black and white style.

In May 2022, Urias released her third EP Her Mind, Pt. 1, where she sang in English, Spanish and Portuguese. The second part of the project was released soon after on November 17, 2022. The full album was released in June 2023 and features a fusion of genres such as electronic pop, alternative R&B, and elements of Latin and Afro-Brazilian music.

A deluxe version of Her Mind, titled Blossom Edition, was released in November 2023 and included three unreleased tracks: "Rolling", "Trip", and "Suave", as well as a remix of the song "Ultimate One" featuring American rapper Cakes da Killa.

In 2026, her album Carranca won the Latin Grammy award for Best Portuguese Language Rock or Alternative Album.

== Discography ==
=== Studio albums ===
- Fúria (2022)
- Her Mind (2023)
- Carranca (2025)

== Filmography ==
Year	Title	Role	Notes
2024	Encantado's	Self	Season 2 – Episode 4: "Intendente x Broadway – Via Taquara"

== Awards and nominations ==
Organization	Year	Category	Nominated work	Result	Ref.
Berlin Music Video Awards	2020	Best Art Direction	"Diaba"	Won	
Latin Grammy Awards	2026	Best Portuguese Language Rock or Alternative Album	Carranca	Won	
MTV MIAW Awards Brazil	2020	Video of the Year	"Diaba"	Nominated	
MTV MIAW Awards Brazil	2022	Black Star Rising	Urias	Nominated	
Multishow Brazilian Music Awards	2022	New Artist of the Year	Urias	Nominated	
Multishow Brazilian Music Awards	2022	Album Cover of the Year	Fúria	Nominated	
M-V-F Awards	2021	Best Editing	"Racha"	Won	
