= Terrible (label) =

American record label

- Founded: 2009
- Founder: Chris Taylor; Ethan Silverman
- Distributor: Independent
- Country of origin: U.S.
- Location: Los Angeles, California
- Official website: terrible.today

Terrible (formerly Terrible Records) is a Los Angeles-based record label and artist management company founded by Chris Taylor and Ethan Silverman in 2009. Originally based in Brooklyn, New York, the label operated as a joint venture imprint of XL Recordings and Beggars Group respectively. It was distributed by Universal Music Group. After a short stint as a imprint with Interscope, Terrible Records is now distributed independently via Stem Distribution. Over the past 4 years Ethan Silverman's focus shifted toward management. His current management roster includes Claud, Sir Chloe, Petey, Exum, The Slaps, Mila Degray, Kali, Liam Benzvi and more.

The label was created in an attempt to spend more time working with and giving exposure to upcoming artists through the release of a number of 7" and 10" EPs. Taylor also released his own solo material (under the moniker CANT) on the label. His solo debut album, Dreams Come True was released on September 13, 2011, via Terrible.

"Terrible Records" logo (2009-2021)

== Roster ==
Current
- Claud
- Liam Benzvi
- Petey
- Sir Chloe
- Exum
- Mila Degray
- Kali
- The Slaps

Former

- Alaska Reid
- Hubert Lenoir
- Jack Ladder
- Kirin J. Callinan (Terrible / XL)
- Kraus
- Billy Uomo
- Cryogeyser
- Dear-God
- Class Actress
- Blood Orange (Terrible / Domino)
- DROOL
- CANT (Terrible / Warp)
- Chairlift (Terrible / Columbia / Young Turks)
- Del Water Gap
- Empress Of (Terrible / XL)
- Kindness (Terrible / Female Energy / Polydor)
- Le1f (Terrible / XL)
- Moses Sumney
- Public Access T.V.
- Ramona Lisa
- Regal Degal
- Sick Feeling
- Solange
- Toulouse
- Twin Shadow
- The Hellp
- Sitcom

== Discography ==
- TR001: Arthur Russell/CANT – "Come to Life"/"Ghosts" (2009)
- TR002: Acrylics – All of the Fire (2009)
- TR003: Class Actress – Journal of Ardency (2010)
- TR004: Twin Shadow/Violens – "Number Four" (2010)
- TR005: Twin Shadow – Forget (2010)
- TR006: Blood Orange – "Blood Orange" (2011)
- TR007: Chairlift – "Amanaemonesia" (2011)
- TR008: CANT – Dreams Come True (2011)
- TR009: Kindness – "Cyan" (2011)
- TR010: Horrid Red – Celestial Joy (2011)
- TR011: Kindness – World, You Need a Change of Mind (2011)
- TR012: Kirin J. Callinan – "WIIW/Thighs" (2012)
- TR013: Solange – "Losing You" (2012)
- TR014: Horrid Red – Nightly Wreaths (2012)
- TR015: Solange – True (2013)
- TR016: Empress Of – Systems (2013)
- TR017: Diamond Terrifier – The Subtle Body Wears a Shadow (2013)
- TR018: Forces – Forces (2013)
- TR019: Kirin J. Callinan – Embracism (2013)
- TR021: Regal Degal – Pyramid Bricks (2014)
- TR022: Ramona Lisa – Arcadia (2014)
- TR024: Le1f – Hey (2014)
- TR026: Porches – "Ronald Paris House" (2014)
- TR028: Sick Feeling – Suburban Myth (2015)
- TR031: Regal Degal – Not Now (2015)
- TRxxx: Petey - Lean Into Life (2021)
- TRxxx: The Hellp - Vol. 1 (2021)
- TRxxx: The Hellp - Enemy (2021)
- TRxxx: The Hellp - Enemy Remixed (2021)
