= A. G. Cook discography =

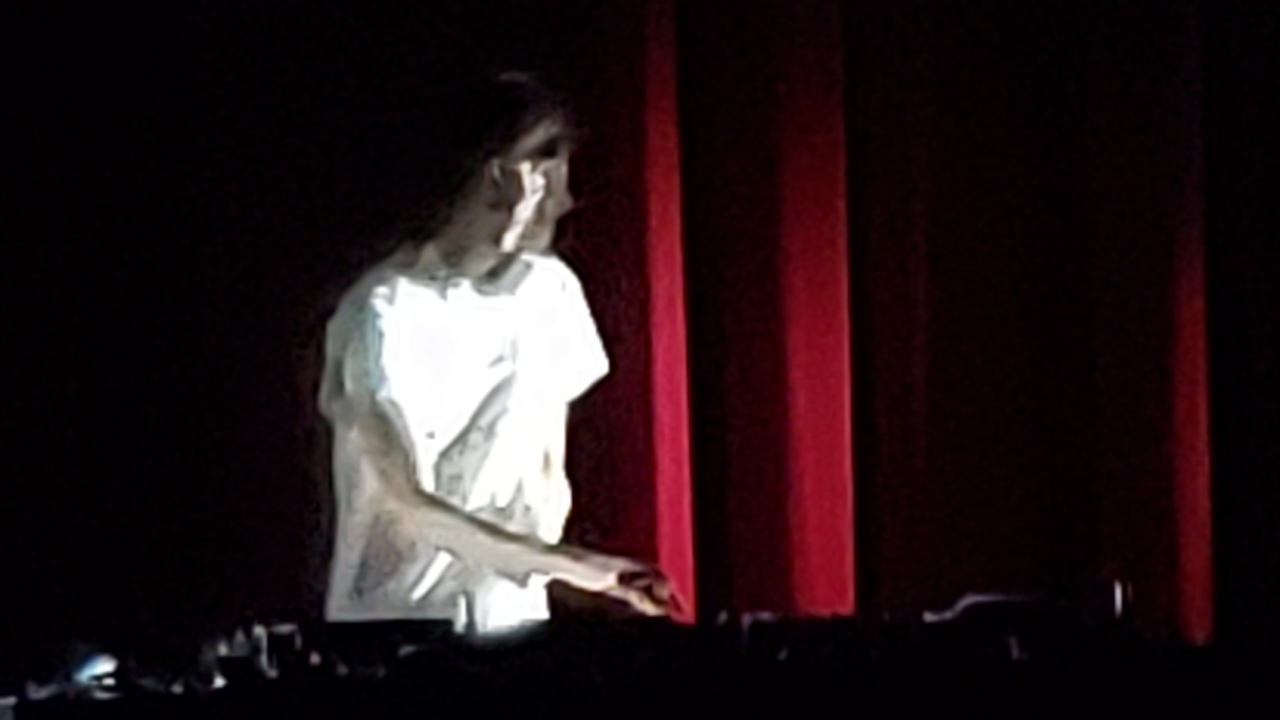
- Cook performing at the Fox Oakland Theatre in 2022
- Studio albums: 3
- EPs: 1
- Singles: 16

English producer A. G. Cook has released three studio albums, one remix album, one mixtape, one extended play and 15 singles. In 2012, he released the classical style piano album Disklavier Concert 1, with fellow labelmate Danny L Harle, Spencer Noble and Tim Phillips, under the moniker "Dux Consort". In 2013, Cook released the album Lifestyle with labelmate Danny L Harle, under the moniker "Dux Content". He also released his debut EP Nu Jack Swung that same year, but did not release a full-length solo project until 2020, with his two debut studio albums, 7G and Apple.

Cook is perhaps best known for his work with British singer Charli XCX, for whom he has produced many tracks. He also executive-produced her albums Charli (2019), How I'm Feeling Now (2020), Brat (2024), and Music, Fashion, Film (2026). Cook has also produced for the likes of Beyoncé, Hikaru Utada, Jónsi, Caroline Polachek, Hannah Diamond, Li Yuchun, among others.

== Albums ==
=== Studio albums ===
Title	Details
7G	Released: 12 August 2020; Label: PC Music; Formats: CD, digital download, streaming
Apple	Released: 18 September 2020; Label: PC Music; Formats: LP, digital download, streaming
Soft Rock (with Finn Keane as Thy Slaughter)	Released: 1 December 2023; Label: PC Music; Formats: Digital download, streaming
Britpop	Released: 10 May 2024; Label: New Alias; Formats: Digital download, streaming

=== Remix albums ===
Title	Details
Apple vs. 7G	Released: 28 May 2021; Label: PC Music; Formats: Digital download, streaming

=== Soundtrack albums ===
Title	Details
The Moment (The Score)	Released: 30 January 2026; Label: A24 Music; Formats: Digital download, streaming

== Extended plays ==
Title	Details
Nu Jack Swung	Released: 31 July 2013; Label: PC Music; Formats: Digital download
Airhorn (as DJ Lifeline)	Released: 10 June 2020; Label: N/A; Formats: Digital download

== Singles ==
Title	Year	Album
"Keri Baby" (featuring Hannah Diamond)	2014	PC Music, Vol. 1
"Beautiful"	2014	PC Music, Vol. 1
"Drop FM" (featuring Hannah Diamond)	2015	Non-album single
"Superstar"	2016	PC Music, Vol. 2
"Money on a Gold Plate" / "Cos I Love U"	2017	Month of Mayhem
"Lifeline"	2019	Apple
"Oh Yeah"	2020	Apple
"Xxoplex"	2020	Apple
"Beautiful Superstar"	2020	Apple
"Beautiful Superstar" (Easyfun Remix)	2021	Apple vs. 7G
"Oh Yeah" (Caroline Polachek Remix)	2021	Apple vs. 7G
"2021" (Umru Remix)	2021	Apple vs. 7G
"The Darkness" (Remix featuring Sarah Bonito and Hannah Diamond)	2021	Apple vs. 7G
"Xcxoplex" (with Charli XCX)	2021	Apple vs. 7G
"Being Harsh" (Oklou cover)	2021	Apple vs. 7G
"Windows" (No Rome Remix)	2021	Apple vs. 7G
"AFK" (with Ö, as AFK)	2022	Hypernormality
"Beautiful" (2023 Edit)	2023	Non-album single
"Sentence" / "If I Knew" (with Easyfun, as Thy Slaughter)	2023	Soft Rock
"Lost Everything" / "Reign" (with Easyfun, as Thy Slaughter)	2023	Soft Rock
"Silver Thread Golden Needle"	2024	Britpop
"Britpop"	2024	Britpop

== Other charted songs ==
Title	Year	Peak chart positions		Album
Title	Year	NZ Hot	US Dance	Album
"911" (A. G. Cook Remix)	2021	34	14	Dawn of Chromatica

== Remixes ==
Title	Year	Artist(s)
"Odyssey, Pt. 2"	2013	Dreamtrak
"B. M. W."	2013	BOY MTN, Karmelloz
"Heaven"	2013	DJ DJ Booth
"Skeleton"	2013	Yola Fatoush
"Show Me"	2014	Zinc
"Repeat Pleasure"	2014	How to Dress Well
"Doing It"	2015	Charli XCX, Rita Ora
"Moteur Action"	2015	Yelle (with Sophie)
"I.D.L"	2015	Life Sim (with Easyfun; as Thy Slaughter)
"Sticky Drama"	2016	Oneohtrix Point Never
"Me4U"	2017	Danny L Harle, Morrie
"Whaaat 85"	2017	TRONICBOX
"Fior di Latte"	2018	Phoenix
"Money Machine"	2019	100 gecs
"So Hot You're Hurting My Feelings"	2019	Caroline Polachek
"Scaredofthedark"	2020	William Crooks
"Claws"	2020	Charli XCX
"La vita nuova"	2020	Christine and the Queens, Caroline Polachek
"Planet's Mad"	2020	Baauer
"Party"	2021	Planet 1999 (with Baseck)
"The Darkness"	2021	A. G. Cook, Sarah Bonito, Hannah Diamond
"Describe"	2021	Perfume Genius
"Spinning"	2021	No Rome, Charli XCX, the 1975
"fall"	2021	Oklou
"galore"	2021	Oklou
"911"	2021	Lady Gaga (with Charli XCX)
"Kinney"	2021	Rostam
"Lost But Never Alone"	2021	Oneohtrix Point Never
"Face My Fears"	2022	Hikaru Utada
"Beg for You"	2022	Charli XCX, Rina Sawayama, Vernon
"Demonic"	2022	Namasenda, La Zowi (with Easyfun; as Thy Slaughter)
"Stop Making This Hurt"	2022	Bleachers
"Lights"	2022	Max Tundra
"3D"	2023	Jungkook, Jack Harlow
"Spalarkle (Alys)"	2023	Felicita, Caroline Polachek
"360"	2024	Charli XCX, Yung Lean, Robyn
"Talk Talk"	2024	Charli XCX, Troye Sivan
"Von Dutch"	2024	Charli XCX, Addison Rae
"Rewind"	2024	Charli XCX, Bladee
"So I"	2024	Charli XCX
"Girl, So Confusing"	2024	Charli XCX, Lorde
"Mean Girls"	2024	Charli XCX, Julian Casablancas
"Yippee-Ki-Yay"	2025	Kesha, T-Pain

== Other appearances ==
Title	Year	Album
"What I Mean"	2014	Non-album single
"Bubs" (with Oneohtrix Point Never)	2014	Non-album single
"Windowlicker"	2017	Month of Mayhem
"Oh Yeah (Live at Appleville)"	2020	Appleville (Golden Ticket)
"Today (Live at Appleville)"	2020	Appleville (Golden Ticket)
"Xxoplex (Moshpit Edit)"	2020	Appleville (Golden Ticket)
"Gold Leaf (Supersaw Edit)"	2020	Appleville (Golden Ticket)
"Slow Yeah"	2020	Appleville (Golden Ticket)
"Oracle Icicle"	2020	Pop Caroler's Songbook
"Glasswurx"	2020	Pop Caroler's Songbook
"The Art of the Muses OST"	2022	Away from Keyboard [file not found]

== Songwriting and production credits ==
=== Albums ===
As executive producer

Year	Title	Artist
2017	Number 1 Angel	Charli XCX
2017	Pop 2	Charli XCX
2018	¥€$	Tommy Cash
2019	Charli	Charli XCX
2019	Reflections	Hannah Diamond
2020	How I'm Feeling Now	Charli XCX
2020	Shiver	Jónsi
2020	Big Bunny	Alaska Reid
2021	Unlimited Ammo	Namasenda
2023	Disenchanter	Alaska Reid
2024	Brat	Charli XCX
2026	Music, Fashion, Film	Charli XCX

=== Tracks ===
Year	Title	Artist(s)	Album	Credits	Writer(s)	Producer(s)
2013	"Pink and Blue"	Hannah Diamond	Non-album single	Co-writer/producer	Hannah Diamond, Cook	Cook
2014	”Build It Up”	Kero Kero Bonito	Non-album single	Co-writer	Cook, Jamie Bulled, Gus Lobban, Sarah Bonito	Kero Kero Bonito
2014	"Hey QT"	QT	Non-album single	Co-writer/co-producer	Sophie Xeon, Cook	SOPHIE, Cook
2014	"Don't Wanna / Let's Do It"	GFOTY	Non-album single	Co-writer/producer	GFOTY, Cook	Cook
2014	"Attachment"	Hannah Diamond	Non-album single	Producer	Hannah Diamond	Cook
2014	"Every Night"	Hannah Diamond	Non-album single	Co-writer/producer	Hannah Diamond, Cook	Cook
2015	"Hi"	Hannah Diamond	Non-album single	Co-writer/producer	Hannah Diamond, Cook	Cook
2015	"Real Love"	Chris Lee (Li Yuchun)	Non-album single	Co-writer/producer	Chris Lee (Li Yuchun), Cook	Cook
2015	"Only You"	Chris Lee (Li Yuchun)	Non-album single	Co-writer/producer	Chris Lee (Li Yuchun), Cook	Cook
2015	"USA"	GFOTY	Non-album single	Co-writer/producer	GFOTY, Cook	Cook
2016	"All the Love I Had"	GFOTY	VIPOTY	Co-writer/producer	GFOTY, Cook	Cook
2016	"Amazing"	GFOTY	VIPOTY	Co-writer/producer	GFOTY, Cook	Cook
2016	"Got My Chad"	GFOTY	VIPOTY	Co-writer/co-producer	GFOTY, Cook, EASYFUN	Cook, EASYFUN
2016	"Poison"	GFOTY	VIPOTY	Co-writer/producer	GFOTY, Cook	Cook
2016	"Mr. E"	GFOTY	Call Him A Doctor	Co-writer/co-producer	GFOTY, Cook, Johnny White	Cook, Johnny White
2016	"Blown"	GFOTY	Call Him A Doctor	Co-writer/co-producer	GFOTY, Cook, Johnny White	Cook, Johnny White
2016	"Lemsip"	GFOTY	Call Him A Doctor	Co-writer/co-producer	GFOTY, Cook, Johnny White	Cook, Johnny White
2016	"Snakes + Ladders"	GFOTY	Call Him A Doctor	Co-writer/co-producer	GFOTY, Cook, Johnny White	Cook, Johnny White
2016	"The Argument"	GFOTY	Call Him A Doctor	Co-writer/co-producer	GFOTY, Cook, Johnny White	Cook, Johnny White
2016	"Wood U"	GFOTY	Call Him A Doctor	Co-writer/co-producer	GFOTY, Cook, Johnny White	Cook, Johnny White
2016	"You Don't"	GFOTY	Call Him A Doctor	Co-writer/co-producer	GFOTY, Cook, Johnny White	Cook, Johnny White
2016	"Call Him A Doctor"	GFOTY	Call Him A Doctor	Co-writer/co-producer	GFOTY, Cook, Johnny White	Cook, Johnny White
2016	"Heaven"	GFOTY	Call Him A Doctor	Co-writer/co-producer	GFOTY, Cook, Johnny White	Cook, Johnny White
2016	"Paradise" (feat. Hannah Diamond)	Charli XCX	Vroom Vroom EP	Co-writer	Sophie Xeon, Charlotte Aitchison, Noonie Bao, Cook, Martin Stilling	SOPHIE
2016	"After the Afterparty" (feat. Lil Yachty)	Charli XCX	Non-album single	Vocal producer	Charlotte Aitchison, Miles McCollum, Rachel Keen, Fred Gibson, Sophie Xeon, Mikkel Eriksen, Tor Hermansen, Eyelar Mirzazadeh	StarGate, FRED, SOPHIE (add.), Cook (voc.)
2017	"Dreamer" (feat. Starrah & Raye)	Charli XCX	Number 1 Angel	Co-writer/producer	Charlotte Aitchison, Cook, Brittany Hazzard, Rachel Keen	Cook
2017	"3AM (Pull Up)" (feat. MØ)	Charli XCX	Number 1 Angel	Co-writer/co-producer	Charlotte Aitchison, Cook, Finn Keane, Karen Marie Ørsted	Cook, EASYFUN
2017	"Blame It On U"	Charli XCX	Number 1 Angel	Co-writer/producer	Charlotte Aitchison, Cook, Noonie Bao	Cook
2017	"Emotional"	Charli XCX	Number 1 Angel	Co-producer	Charlotte Aitchison, Patrik Berger	Cook, EASYFUN
2017	"White Roses"	Charli XCX	Number 1 Angel	Co-writer/producer	Charlotte Aitchison, Cook, Noonie Bao	Cook
2017	"Drugs" (feat. ABRA)	Charli XCX	Number 1 Angel	Co-writer/producer	Charlotte Aitchison, Cook, Gabrielle Mirville	Cook
2017	"Lipgloss" (feat. cupcakKe)	Charli XCX	Number 1 Angel	Co-writer/co-producer	Charlotte Aitchison, Cook, Elizabeth Harris	Cook, SOPHIE, Life Sim
2017	"Month of Mayhem"	GFOTY	Month of Mayhem	Co-writer/producer	GFOTY, Cook	Cook
2017	"Dirty Sexy Money" (feat. Charli XCX & French Montana)	David Guetta & Afrojack	Non-album single	Co-writer	Karim Kharbouch, Nick Van De Wall, Noonie Bao, Cook, David Guetta, Charlotte Aitchison	David Guetta, Afrojack, Skrillex (co.)
2017	"Backseat" (feat. Carly Rae Jepsen)	Charli XCX	Pop 2	Co-writer/co-producer	Charlotte Aitchison, Cook, Finn Keane, Carly Rae Jepsen	Cook, EASYFUN
2017	"Out of My Head" (feat. Tove Lo & ALMA)	Charli XCX	Pop 2	Co-writer/co-producer	Charlotte Aitchison, Sophie Xeon, Cook, Ebba Tove Nilsson, Alma-Sofia Miettinen	Cook, SOPHIE
2017	"Lucky"	Charli XCX	Pop 2	Co-writer/co-producer	Charlotte Aitchison, Cook, Nicolas Petitfrère	Cook, Ö
2017	"Tears" (feat. Caroline Polachek)	Charli XCX	Pop 2	Co-writer/producer	Charlotte Aitchison, Cook, Caroline Polachek	Cook
2017	"I Got It" (feat. Brooke Candy, cupcakKe & Pabllo Vittar)	Charli XCX	Pop 2	Co-writer/co-producer	Charlotte Aitchison, Cook, Jesse Shatkin, Pablo Bispo, Rodrigo Gorky, Arthur Marques, Jesse St. John Geller, Phabullo da Silva, Elizabeth Harris	Cook, umru
2017	"Femmebot" (feat. Dorian Electra & Mykki Blanco)	Charli XCX	Pop 2	Co-writer/co-producer	Cook, David Gamson, Finn Keane, Francisca Hall, Michael Quattelbaum Jr.	Cook, David Gamson, EASYFUN
2017	"Delicious" (feat. Tommy Cash)	Charli XCX	Pop 2	Co-writer/producer	Charlotte Aitchison, Cook, Tomas Tammemets	Cook
2017	"Unlock It" (feat. Kim Petras & Jay Park)	Charli XCX	Pop 2	Co-writer/co-producer	Charlotte Aitchison, Cook, Kim Petras, Park Jae-beom	Cook, Life Sim
2017	"Porsche" (feat. MØ)	Charli XCX	Pop 2	Co-writer/co-producer	Charlotte Aitchison, Cook, Henry Allen, Cassia O'Reilly, Karen Marie Ørsted	Cook, EASYFUN, King Henry
2017	"Track 10"	Charli XCX	Pop 2	Co-writer/co-producer	Charlotte Aitchison, Cook, Mikkel Eriksen, Tor Hermansen, Noonie Bao, Sasha Sloan	Cook, StarGate, Life Sim, Lil Data
2017	"My Song"	GFOTY	GFOTYBUCKS	Co-writer/producer	GFOTY, Cook	Cook
2017	"Believe"	GFOTY	GFOTYBUCKS	Co-writer/producer	GFOTY, Cook	Cook
2017	"Don't Wanna / Let's Do It" (Bucks Mix)	GFOTY	GFOTYBUCKS	Co-writer/producer	GFOTY, Cook	Cook
2017	"Tongue"	GFOTY	GFOTYBUCKS	Co-writer/producer	GFOTY, Cook	Cook
2017	"Unbreak My Heart"	GFOTY	GFOTYBUCKS	Co-writer/producer	GFOTY, Cook	Cook
2017	"Red Silver Blue"	GFOTY	GFOTYBUCKS	Co-writer/producer	GFOTY, Cook	Cook
2017	"Huge"	GFOTY	GFOTYBUCKS	Co-writer/producer	GFOTY, Cook	Cook
2017	"Mysterious GFOTY"	GFOTY	GFOTYBUCKS	Co-writer/producer	GFOTY, Cook	Cook
2017	"Christmas Day"	GFOTY	GFOTYBUCKS	Co-writer/producer	GFOTY, Cook	Cook
2017	"Lemsip" (Bucks Mix)	GFOTY	GFOTYBUCKS	Co-writer/producer	GFOTY, Cook	Cook
2017	"All the Small Things"	GFOTY	GFOTYBUCKS	Co-writer/producer	GFOTY, Cook	Cook
2017	"Lover"	GFOTY	GFOTYBUCKS	Co-writer/producer	GFOTY, Cook	Cook
2017	"Drown Her"	GFOTY	GFOTYBUCKS	Co-writer/producer	GFOTY, Cook	Cook
2017	"It's All Coming Back to Me Now"	GFOTY	GFOTYBUCKS	Co-writer/producer	GFOTY, Cook	Cook
2017	"Kiss"	GFOTY	GFOTYBUCKS	Co-writer/producer	GFOTY, Cook	Cook
2017	"Nobody Does It Better"	GFOTY	GFOTYBUCKS	Co-writer/producer	GFOTY, Cook	Cook
2017	"Friday Night"	GFOTY	GFOTYBUCKS	Co-writer/producer	GFOTY, Cook	Cook
2018	"Pussy Money Weed"	Tommy Cash	Non-album single	Producer	Tommy Cash	Cook
2018	"Mood"	Carlie Hanson	Non-album single	Co-writer/producer	Carlie Hanson, Leland, Cook	Cook
2018	"Focus"	Charli XCX	Non-album single	Co-writer/co-producer	Charlotte Aitchison, Cook, Jack & Coke	Cook, Jack & Coke
2018	"Little Molly"	Tommy Cash	Non-album single	Co-producer	Tommy Cash	felicita, Cook, Tommy Cash
2018	"MONA LISA" (feat. Rick Owens)	Tommy Cash	¥€$	Co-writer/producer	Tommy Cash, Rick Owens, Cook	Cook
2018	"X-RAY"	Tommy Cash	¥€$	Additional producer	Tommy Cash, Danny L Harle, Caroline Polachek	Danny L Harle, Cook (add.)
2018	"HORSE B4 PORSCHE"	Tommy Cash	¥€$	Co-writer/producer	Tommy Cash, Cook	Cook
2018	"DOSTOYEVSKY"	Tommy Cash	¥€$	Co-writer/producer	Tommy Cash, Cook	Cook
2018	"COOL 3D WORLD"	Tommy Cash	¥€$	Co-writer/producer	Tommy Cash, Charlotte Aitchison, Cook	Cook
2019	"Next Level Charli"	Charli XCX	Charli	Co-writer/producer	Charlotte Aitchison, Cook	Cook
2019	"Gone" (with Christine and the Queens)	Charli XCX	Charli	Co-writer/co-producer	Charlotte Aitchison, Cook, Noonie Bao, Linus Wiklund, Héloïse Letissier, Nicolas Petitfrère	Cook, Lotus IV, Ö, Baseck (add.)
2019	"Cross You Out" (feat. Sky Ferreira)	Charli XCX	Charli	Co-writer/co-producer	Charlotte Aitchison, Cook, Noonie Bao, Linus Wiklund,	Cook, Lotus IV
2019	"Click" (feat. Kim Petras & Tommy Cash)	Charli XCX	Charli	Co-writer/co-producer	Charlotte Aitchison, Cook, Jaan Umru Rothenburg, Theron Thomas, Tommy Cash, Dylan Brady	Cook, umru, Dylan Brady, Ö (add.)
2019	"Warm" (feat. HAIM)	Charli XCX	Charli	Co-writer/producer	Charlotte Aitchison, Cook, Este Haim, Danielle Haim, Alana Haim	Cook
2019	"Thoughts"	Charli XCX	Charli	Co-writer/producer	Charlotte Aitchison, Cook	Cook
2019	"Blame It On Your Love" (feat. Lizzo)	Charli XCX	Charli	Additional producer	Charlotte Aitchison, Noonie Bao, Lizzo, Sasha Sloan, StarGate, Finn Keane	StarGate, Finn Keane (add.), Cook (add.)
2019	"White Mercedes"	Charli XCX	Charli	Additional producer	Charlotte Aitchison, Andrew Wotman, Ali Tamposi, Nathan Perez	Watt, Happy Perez, Cook (add.)
2019	"Silver Cross"	Charli XCX	Charli	Co-writer/producer	Charlotte Aitchison, Cook	Cook
2019	"I Don't Wanna Know"	Charli XCX	Charli	Co-writer/producer	Charlotte Aitchison, Cook	Cook
2019	"Official"	Charli XCX	Charli	Co-writer/co-producer	Charlotte Aitchison, Cook, Noonie Bao, Patrik Berger, Finn Keane	Cook, EASYFUN, Patrik Berger
2019	"Shake It" (feat. Big Freedia, cupcakKe, Brooke Candy & Pabllo Vittar)	Charli XCX	Charli	Co-writer/co-producer	Charlotte Aitchison, Cook, Nicolas Petitfrère, Elizabeth Harris, Freddie Ross Jr., Pabllo Vittar, Rodrigo Gorsky, Pablo Bispo, Arthur Marques, Zebu, Maffalda	Cook, Ö
2019	"February 2017" (feat. Clairo & Yaeji)	Charli XCX	Charli	Co-writer/co-producer	Charlotte Aitchison, Claire Cottrill, Katherine Yaeji Lee, Charles Teiller, Alexandre Teiller, Caroline Beatrix Maurin, Cook	Planet 1999, Cook
2019	"2099" (feat. Troye Sivan)	Charli XCX	Charli	Co-writer/co-producer	Charlotte Aitchison, Cook, Troye Sivan, Nicolas Petitfrère	Cook, Ö
2019	"Ocean of Tears"	Caroline Polachek	Pang	Additional producer	Caroline Polachek, Nathaniel Campany, Kyle Shearer	Caroline Polachek, Danny L Harle, Valley Girl, Cook (add.)
2019	"Hey Big Eyes"	Caroline Polachek	Pang	Co-producer	Caroline Polachek	Caroline Polachek, Cook
2019	"Reflections"	Hannah Diamond	Reflections	Co-writer/producer	Hannah Diamond, Cook	Cook
2019	"Invisible"	Hannah Diamond	Reflections	Co-writer/co-producer	Hannah Diamond, Cook, Finn Keane, Thomas Carrell, Christopher Mason	Cook, EASYFUN
2019	"Love Goes On"	Hannah Diamond	Reflections	Co-writer/producer	Hannah Diamond, Cook	Cook
2019	"Never Again"	Hannah Diamond	Reflections	Co-writer/producer	Hannah Diamond, Cook	Cook
2019	"True"	Hannah Diamond	Reflections	Co-writer/producer	Hannah Diamond, Cook	Cook
2019	"Concrete Angel"	Hannah Diamond	Reflections	Producer	Gareth Emery, Christina Novelli	Cook
2019	"The Ending"	Hannah Diamond	Reflections	Co-writer/producer	Hannah Diamond, Cook	Cook
2019	"Shy"	Hannah Diamond	Reflections	Co-writer/producer	Hannah Diamond, Cook	Cook
2019	"Fade Away"	Hannah Diamond	Reflections	Co-writer/co-producer	Hannah Diamond, Cook, Finn Keane	Cook, EASYFUN
2019	"Make Believe"	Hannah Diamond	Reflections	Co-writer/co-producer	Hannah Diamond, Cook, Finn Keane	Cook, EASYFUN
2019	"24/7"	Namasenda	Non-album single	Co-writer/co-producer	Namasenda, Robokid, Cook, Rebecca Scheja, Fiona Fitzpatrick	Robokid, Cook
2019	"Bricks"	Tommy Genesis & Charli XCX	Non-album single	Producer	Charlotte Aitchison, Genesis Mohanraj	Cook
2020	"Dare (AM)"	Namasenda	Non-album single	Co-writer/producer	Namasenda, Cook	Cook
2020	"Dare (PM)"	Namasenda	Non-album single	Co-writer/producer	Namasenda, Cook	Cook
2020	"pink diamond"	Charli XCX	how i'm feeling now	Co-writer/co-producer	Charlotte Aitchison, Dijon Duenas, Cook	Dijon, Cook
2020	"forever"	Charli XCX	how i'm feeling now	Co-writer/co-producer	Charlotte Aitchison, Cook, BJ Burton	Cook, BJ Burton
2020	"7 years"	Charli XCX	how i'm feeling now	Co-writer/co-producer	Charlotte Aitchison, Cook, BJ Burton	Cook, BJ Burton
2020	"detonate"	Charli XCX	how i'm feeling now	Co-writer/producer	Charlotte Aitchison, Cook	Cook
2020	"i finally understand"	Charli XCX	how i'm feeling now	Additional producer	Charlotte Aitchison, Benjamin Keating	Palmistry, Cook (add.), Mechatok (add.)
2020	"c2.0"	Charli XCX	how i'm feeling now	Co-writer/producer	Charlotte Aitchison, Cook, Dylan Brady, Umru Rotherberg, Theron Thomas, Tommy Cash	Cook
2020	"party 4 u"	Charli XCX	how i'm feeling now	Co-writer/producer	Charlotte Aitchison, Cook	Cook
2020	"visions"	Charli XCX	how i'm feeling now	Co-writer/co-producer	Charlotte Aitchison, Cook, BJ Burton	Cook, BJ Burton
2020	"girl on my throne" (feat. Casey MQ)	Oklou	Galore	Co-writer/additional producer	Marylou Mayniel, Casey Manierka, Finn Keane, Cook	Casey MQ, Florian Le Prise, Oklou (co), Cook (add.)
2020	"Exhale"	Jónsi	Shiver	Co-writer/co-producer	Jónsi, Cook	Cook, Jónsi
2020	"Shiver"	Jónsi	Shiver	Co-producer	Jónsi	Cook, Jónsi, Nicolas Petitfrère (add.)
2020	"Cannibal" (with Elizabeth Fraser)	Jónsi	Shiver	Co-producer	Jónsi, Elizabeth Fraser	Cook, Jónsi, Nicolas Petitfrère (add.)
2020	"Wildeye"	Jónsi	Shiver	Co-writer/co-producer	Jónsi, Cook	Cook, Jónsi, Nicolas Petitfrère (add.)
2020	"Sumarið sem aldrei kom"	Jónsi	Shiver	Co-producer	Jónsi	Cook, Jónsi, Nicolas Petitfrère (add.)
2020	"Kórall"	Jónsi	Shiver	Co-writer/co-producer	Jónsi, Cook	Cook, Jónsi, Nicolas Petitfrère (add.), Jack Armitage (add.)
2020	"Salt Licorice" (with Robyn)	Jónsi	Shiver	Co-producer	Jónsi	Cook, Jónsi
2020	"Hold"	Jónsi	Shiver	Co-writer/co-producer	Jónsi, Cook	Cook, Jónsi
2020	"Swill"	Jónsi	Shiver	Co-producer	Jónsi	Cook, Jónsi
2020	"Grenade"	Jónsi	Shiver	Co-producer	Jónsi	Cook, Jónsi
2020	"Beautiful Boy"	Jónsi	Shiver	Co-producer	Jónsi	Cook, Jónsi
2020	"Crickets"	Cecile Believe	Plucking a Cherry From The Void	Co-writer/additional producer	Cecile Believe, Cook	Cecile Believe, Cook (add.)
2020	"Living My Life Over (Extreme Vocal Edit)"	Cecile Believe	Plucking a Cherry From The Void	Additional producer	Cecile Believe	Cecile Believe, Cook (add.)
2020	"Big Bunny"	Alaska Reid	Big Bunny	Producer	Alaska Reid	Cook
2020	"Warm"	Alaska Reid	Big Bunny	Additional producer	Alaska Reid, Max Hershenow	Max Hershenow, Cook (add.)
2020	"Oblivion"	Alaska Reid	Big Bunny	Co-writer/co-producer	Alaska Reid, Cook, Rodaidh McDonald	Cook, Rodaidh McDonald
2020	"Quake"	Alaska Reid	Big Bunny	Co-writer/producer	Alaska Reid, Cook	Cook
2020	"Boys From Town"	Alaska Reid	Big Bunny	Co-writer/additional producer	Alaska Reid, Tom Stafford, Cook	Tom Stafford, Cook (add.)
2020	"Amber"	Alaska Reid	Big Bunny	Additional producer	Alaska Reid, Max Hershenow	Max Hershenow, Cook (add.)
2021	"Mold"	Jónsi	Shiver	Co-writer/co-producer	Jónsi, Cook	Cook, Jónsi
2021	"Mermaid Tears (Midnight)"	Alaska Reid	Oblivion Tears	Producer	Alaska Reid	Cook
2021	"Oblivion (Midnight)"	Alaska Reid	Oblivion Tears	Co-writer/producer	Alaska Reid, Cook, Rodaidh McDonald	Cook
2021	"In Your Arms"	AlexMaax	Constant Touch EP	Co-producer	Max Hershenow	Cook, AlexMaax
2021	"Bad Moon Rising"	Minotaur Jr.	Non-album single	Producer	John Fogerty	Cook
2021	"Feel the Pain"	Alaska Reid	Non-album single	Producer	Joseph Donald Mascis Jr.	Cook
2021	"You For Me" (feat. Rita Ora)	Sigala	Non-album single	Co-writer	Cook, Charlotte Emma Aitchison, Finn Keane, Joakim Jarl, Madison Love, Rita Sahatçiu Ora, Sigala	Sigala, Jarly, Neave Applebaum
2021	"Black Ops 2"	Namasenda	Unlimited Ammo	Co-writer/co-producer	Naomi Namasenda, Dylan Brady, Cook	Dylan Brady, Cook
2021	"Demonic" (feat. La Zowi)	Namasenda	Unlimited Ammo	Producer	Naomi Namasenda, Peter Hjerpe, Dennis Solander Sule	Cook
2021	"Banana Clip" (feat. Mowalola)	Namasenda	Unlimited Ammo	Co-producer	Peter Hjerpe, Dennis Solander Sule, Naomi Namasenda, Mowalola Ogunlesi	Yemi, Cook
2021	"Vvolvo"	Namasenda	Unlimited Ammo	Co-writer/producer	Naomi Namasenda, Cook	Cook
2021	"☆" (feat. Oklou)	Namasenda	Unlimited Ammo	Co-writer/co-producer	Naomi Namasenda, Marylou Maniel, Dylan Brady, Cook	Dylan Brady, Cook
2021	"Steel" (feat. Hannah Diamond)	Namasenda	Unlimited Ammo	Co-writer/producer	Naomi Namasenda, Hannah Diamond, Oscar Pollock, Cook	Cook
2021	"Unlimited Ammo"	Namasenda	Unlimited Ammo	Producer	Naomi Namasenda	Cook
2021	"Finish Him" (feat. Joey LaBeija)	Namasenda	Unlimited Ammo	Co-writer/co-producer	Cook, Naomi Namasenda, Joey LaBeija	Life Sim, Cook
2021	"No Regrets"	Namasenda	Unlimited Ammo	Co-writer/producer	Naomi Namasenda, Cook, Suffy Baala	Cook
2021	"On My Mind"	Namasenda	Unlimited Ammo	Co-writer/producer	Naomi Namasenda, Victoria Alkin, Louise Lindberg, Cook	Cook
2021	"Snow"	Namasenda	Unlimited Ammo	Co-writer	Naomi Namasenda, Leonard Nagel, Cook	Stahl
2021	"Clouds"	Namasenda	Unlimited Ammo	Co-writer/producer	Naomi Namasenda, Elsa Levahn, Cook	Cook
2021	"Shots Fired"	Namasenda	Unlimited Ammo	Co-writer/co-producer	Naomi Namasenda, Cecile Thompson-Hannant, Cook	Baseck, Cook
2021	"No Shadow"	Hyd	Hyd	Co-writer/producer	Hayden Dunham, Cook, Caroline Polachek, Nicolas Petitfrère	Cook
2021	"Skin 2 Skin"	Hyd	Hyd	Co-writer/co-producer	Hayden Dunham, Caroline Polachek, Cook	Caroline Polachek, Cook
2021	"The One"	Hyd	Hyd	Co-writer/co-producer	Hayden Dunham, Cook, Umru Rothenberg	Cook, umru
2021	"The Look On Your Face"	Hyd	Hyd	Co-writer/producer	Hayden Dunham, Cook	Cook
2022	"One Last Kiss"	Hikaru Utada	Bad Mode	Co-producer	Hikaru Utada	Hikaru Utada, Cook
2022	"Kimi ni Muchū (君に夢中)"	Hikaru Utada	Bad Mode	Co-producer	Hikaru Utada	Hikaru Utada, Cook
2022	"Crash"	Charli XCX	Crash	Co-writer/co-producer	Charlotte Aitchison, George Daniel, Cook, Waylon Rector	George Daniel, Cook
2022	"Every Rule"	Charli XCX	Crash	Co-writer/co-producer	Charlotte Aitchison, Cook	Cook, Daniel Lopatin, Matt Cohn (add.)
2022	"What You Think About Me"	Charli XCX	Crash	Co-writer/producer	Charlotte Aitchison, Waylon Rector, Cook	Cook
2022	"All Up in Your Mind"	Beyoncé	Renaissance	Co-writer/co-producer	Beyoncé Knowles, Jabbar Stevens, Cherdericka Nichols, Michael Tucker, Cook, Mike Dean, Larry Griffin Jr., Jameil Aossey	Beyoncé, BAH, BloodPop (co), Cook (co), Mike Dean (co), Symbolyc One (co), Jameil Aossey (co), The-Dream (add.)
2022	"Trust"	Hyd	Clearing	Co-writer/co-producer	Hyd, Caroline Polachek, SOPHIE, Cook	SOPHIE, Cook
2022	"Fallen Angel	Hyd	Clearing	Co-writer/co-producer	Hyd, Danny L Harle, SOPHIE, Cook	SOPHIE, Cook
2022	"So Clear"	Hyd	Clearing	Additional producer	Hyd, Easyfun, SOPHIE	Easyfun, SOPHIE, Cook (add.)
2022	"Oil + Honey"	Hyd	Clearing	Co-writer/co-producer	Hyd, Cook, Alex Somers, Jónsi	Cook, Alex Somers, Jónsi
2022	"Breaking Ground"	Hyd	Clearing	Additional producer	Hyd, Easyfun	Easyfun, Cook (add.)
2022	"Chlorophyll"	Hyd	Clearing	Co-producer	Hyd, Easyfun	Thy Slaughter
2022	"The Real You"	Hyd	Clearing	Co-writer/co-producer	Hyd, SOPHIE, Cook, John Roberts	SOPHIE, Cook
2022	"Bright Light"	Hyd	Clearing	Co-writer/producer	Hyd, Cook	Cook
2022	"Only Living for You"	Hyd	Clearing	Co-writer/co-producer	Hyd, SOPHIE, Cook	SOPHIE, Cook
2023	"Welcome To My Island"	Caroline Polachek	Desire, I Want to Turn Into You	Additional producer	Caroline Polachek, Dan Nigro, James Stack	Caroline Polachek, Dan Nigro, Danny L Harle, Jim-E Stack, Cook (add.)
2023	"Lick the Light Out" (feat. Madonna)	Christine and the Queens	Paranoïa, Angels, True Love	Additional producer	Héloïse Letissier, Darren King, Joseph Bishara, Mike Dean	Christine and the Queens, Mike Dean, Cook (add.)
2023	"Make Me Cry"	Astra King	First Love	Co-writer/additional producer	Astra King, Cook	Astra King, Cook (add.)
2023	"French Fries"	Alaska Reid	Disenchanter	Producer	Alaska Reid, Max Hershenow	Cook
2023	"Dogs & Girls"	Alaska Reid	Disenchanter	Co-producer	Alaska Reid	Alaska Reid, Cook
2023	"She Wonders"	Alaska Reid	Disenchanter	Producer	Alaska Reid	Cook
2023	"Leftover"	Alaska Reid	Disenchanter	Producer	Alaska Reid	Cook
2023	"Palomino"	Alaska Reid	Disenchanter	Co-writer/producer	Alaska Reid, Cook, Waylon Rector	Cook
2023	"Back To This"	Alaska Reid	Disenchanter	Co-writer/producer	Alaska Reid, Cook	Cook
2023	"Always"	Alaska Reid	Disenchanter	Producer	Alaska Reid, Max Hershenow	Cook
2023	"Seeds"	Alaska Reid	Disenchanter	Producer	Alaska Reid	Cook
2023	"Airship"	Alaska Reid	Disenchanter	Co-producer	Alaska Reid	Alaska Reid, Cook
2023	"Gold ~また逢う日まで~"	Hikaru Utada	Non-album single	Co-producer	Hikaru Utada	Hikaru Utada, Cook
2023	"Audio"	Easyfun	Electric	Co-writer/additional producer	Finn Keane, Cook	Easyfun, Cook (add.)
2023	"HARDPAIN"	Easyfun	Electric	Additional producer	Finn Keane	Easyfun, Cook (add.)
2023	"No Body"	Easyfun	Electric	Co-writer	Cook, Charlotte Aitchison, Finn Keane, Noonie Bao, Patrik Berger	Easyfun
2023	"Yes No Okay"	Charli XCX	Bottoms (Original Motion Picture Score)	Co-writer/co-producer	Charlotte Emma Aitchison, Cook, George Bedford Daniel	Cook, George Bedford Daniel
2023	"School Fight"	Charli XCX & Leo Birenberg	Bottoms (Original Motion Picture Score)	Co-writer/co-producer	Charlotte Emma Aitchison, Cook, George Bedford Daniel	Leo Birenberg, Cook, George Bedford Daniel
2023	"Lockers"	Charli XCX & Leo Birenberg	Bottoms (Original Motion Picture Score)	Co-writer/co-producer	Charlotte Emma Aitchison, Cook, George Bedford Daniel	Cook, George Bedford Daniel
2023	"Mr. G"	Charli XCX & Leo Birenberg	Bottoms (Original Motion Picture Score)	Co-writer/co-producer	Charlotte Emma Aitchison, Cook, George Bedford Daniel	Cook, George Bedford Daniel
2023	"Teaching Each Other"	Charli XCX & Leo Birenberg	Bottoms (Original Motion Picture Score)	Co-writer	Charlotte Emma Aitchison, Cook, George Bedford Daniel, Leo Birenberg	Leo Birenberg
2023	"Josie at Juvie"	Charli XCX & Leo Birenberg	Bottoms (Original Motion Picture Score)	Co-writer/co-producer	Charlotte Emma Aitchison, Cook, George Bedford Daniel	Cook, George Bedford Daniel
2023	"Car Wash"	Charli XCX & Leo Birenberg	Bottoms (Original Motion Picture Score)	Co-writer/co-producer	Charlotte Emma Aitchison, Cook, George Bedford Daniel	Cook, George Bedford Daniel
2023	"All Night"	Charli XCX & Leo Birenberg	Bottoms (Original Motion Picture Score)	Co-writer/co-producer	Charlotte Emma Aitchison, Cook, George Bedford Daniel	Cook, George Bedford Daniel
2023	"Be With"	Charli XCX & Leo Birenberg	Bottoms (Original Motion Picture Score)	Co-writer/co-producer	Charlotte Emma Aitchison, Cook, George Bedford Daniel	Cook, George Bedford Daniel
2023	"The Final Fucking Hour"	Charli XCX & Leo Birenberg	Bottoms (Original Motion Picture Score)	Co-writer/co-producer	Charlotte Emma Aitchison, Cook, George Bedford Daniel	Cook, George Bedford Daniel
2023	"Pineapple Juice"	Charli XCX & Leo Birenberg	Bottoms (Original Motion Picture Score)	Co-writer/co-producer	Charlotte Emma Aitchison, Cook, George Bedford Daniel	Cook, George Bedford Daniel
2023	"Final Face-Off"	Charli XCX & Leo Birenberg	Bottoms (Original Motion Picture Score)	Co-writer/co-producer	Charlotte Emma Aitchison, Cook, George Bedford Daniel	Cook, George Bedford Daniel
2023	"Dream (Alternate Fight Sequence)"	Charli XCX & Leo Birenberg	Bottoms (Original Motion Picture Score)	Co-writer/co-producer	Charlotte Emma Aitchison, Cook, George Bedford Daniel	Cook, George Bedford Daniel
2023	"Perfect Picture"	Hannah Diamond	Perfect Picture	Co-writer	Hannah Amond, David Gamson, Cook	David Gamson
2023	"Impossible"	Hannah Diamond	Perfect Picture	Co-writer	Hannah Amond, David Gamson, Cook, Finn Keane, Nate Campany	David Gamson
2023	"Everything I Want"	Ilsey	From the Valley	Co-writer/producer	Ilsey Juber, Cook	Cook
2023	"Hana"	Fujii Kaze	Non-album single	Producer	Fujii Kaze	Cook
2023	"How to Stay With You"	Troye Sivan	Something to Give Each Other	Co-writer/co-producer	Cook, Leland, Oscar Görres, Troye Sivan Mellet	Oscar Görres, Cook
2023	"In the City"	Charli XCX & Sam Smith	Non-album single	Co-writer/co-producer	Charlotte Aitchison, Cook, Ilya Salmanzadeh, Omer Fedi, Sam Smith	Cook, Charli XCX, George Daniel, ILYA, Omer Fedi
2023	"IV. Deer in the Headlights"	Lecx Stacy	A Glint in the Holocene!	Additional producer	Lecx Stacy	Lecx Stacy, Cook (add.)
2024	"何色でもない花 (A Flower of No Color)"	Hikaru Utada	Non-album single	Co-producer	Hikaru Utada	Hikaru Utada, Cook
2024	"Spring Is Coming With A Strawberry In The Mouth"	Caroline Polachek	Desire, I Want to Turn Into You (Everasking Edition)	Co-producer	Caroline Polachek, Roger Doyle, Elena López	Caroline Polachek, Cook
2024	"Obsessed"	horsegiirL	Non-album single	Co-producer	horsegiirL, Tom Demac	Cook, BAUGRUPPE90, Tom Demac
2024	"Addicted to You (Re-Recording)"	Hikaru Utada	Science Fiction	Co-producer	Hikaru Utada	Hikaru Utada, Cook
2024	"Hikari (Re-Recording)"	Hikaru Utada	Science Fiction	Co-producer	Hikaru Utada	Hikaru Utada, Cook
2024	"Starburned and Unkissed"	Caroline Polachek	I Saw The TV Glow (Original Soundtrack)	Co-writer/producer	Caroline Polachek, Cook	Cook
2024	"360"	Charli XCX	BRAT	Co-writer/co-producer	Charlotte Aitchison, Cook, Henry Walter, Finn Keane, Omer Fedi, Blake Slatkin	Cirkut, Cook, Finn Keane (add.)
2024	"Club classics"	Charli XCX	BRAT	Co-producer	Charlotte Aitchison, George Daniel	Cook, George Daniel
2024	"Talk talk"	Charli XCX	BRAT	Co-writer/additional production	Charlotte Aitchison, Cook, Ross Matthew Birchard	Hudson Mohawke, Cook (add.)
2024	"Everything is romantic"	Charli XCX	BRAT	Co-producer	Charlotte Aitchison, Pablo Díaz-Reixa	Cook, Charli XCX, El Guincho, Jasper Harris (add.), Jae Deal (add.), Marlonwiththeglasses (add.)
2024	"Rewind"	Charli XCX	BRAT	Co-writer/co-producer	Charlotte Aitchison, Henry Walter, Cook	Cook, Cirkut
2024	"So I"	Charli XCX	BRAT	Co-producer	Charlotte Aitchison, Finn Keane, Jon Christopher Shave	Cook, Jon Shave
2024	"Girl, so confusing"	Charli XCX	BRAT	Co-writer/producer	Charlotte Aitchison, Cook	Cook
2024	"Apple"	Charli XCX	BRAT	Co-producer	Charlotte Aitchison, George Daniel, Linus Wiklund, Noonie Bao	Cook, Charli XCX, George Daniel, Linus Wiklund
2024	"B2b"	Charli XCX	BRAT	Co-writer/co-producer	Charlotte Aitchison, Mike Lévy	Cook, Gesaffelstein, Omer Fedi
2024	"Mean girls"	Charli XCX	BRAT	Co-writer/co-producer	Charlotte Aitchison, Cook, Ross Matthew Birchard	Cook, Hudson Mohawke
2024	"I think about it all the time"	Charli XCX	BRAT	Co-writer/co-producer	Charlotte Aitchison, Cook, Finn Keane, Jon Christopher Shave	Cook, Finn Keane
2024	"365"	Charli XCX	BRAT	Co-writer/co-producer	Charlotte Aitchison, Cook	Cook, Cirkut
2024	"Hello goodbye"	Charli XCX	Brat and it's the same but there's three more songs so it's not	Co-writer/producer	Charlotte Aitchison, Cook	Cook
2024	"Spring breakers"	Charli XCX	Brat and it's the same but there's three more songs so it's not	Co-writer/co-producer	Charlotte Aitchison, Cook, Finn Keane, Jon Shave	Cook, Finn Keane, Jon Shave
2024	"Feelin' Go(o)d"	Fujii Kaze	Non-album single	Producer	Fujii Kaze	Cook
2024	"Block"	Brooke Candy	CANDYLAND	Co-writer/additional production	Cook, Brooke Candy, Charlotte Aitchison, Dylan Brady, Gigi Grombacher, Jesse Saint John	Dylan Brady, Cook (add.)
2024	"UFO"	f5ve	Sequence 01	Co-writer/co-producer	Cook, BloodPop, Mark Johns	Cook, BloodPop, Nömak
2024	"Hottie"	Tommy Cash	HIGH FASHION	Co-writer/co-producer	Tomas Tammemets, Cook, Jaan Umru Rothenberg	Cook, umru
2024	"HIGH FASHION"	Tommy Cash	HIGH FASHION	Co-writer/co-producer	Tomas Tammemets, Cook, Jaan Umru Rothenberg, Naomi Abergel	Cook, umru
2025	"thank you for recording"	Oklou	choke enough	Co-writer/co-producer	Marylou Mayniel, Caila Thompson-Hannant, Casey Manierka-Quaile, Cook	Oklou, Casey MQ, Cook
2025	"ict"	Oklou	choke enough	Co-writer/co-producer	Marylou Mayniel, Casey Manierka-Quaile, Cook	Oklou, Casey MQ, Cook
2025	"Magic Clock"	f5ve	Sequence 01	Co-writer/co-producer	Cook, BloodPop, Count Baldor, Emyli, Naomie Abergel	Cook, BloodPop
2025	"Saiko"	yeule	Evangelic Girl Is a Gun	Co-writer/co-producer	Nat Ćmiel, Kin Leonn, Cook	Nat Ćmiel, Kin Leonn, Cook
2025	"Dull"	Turnstile	NEVER ENOUGH	Additional production	Turnstile	Brendan Yates, Cook (add.), Will Yip (add.)
2026	"Rock Music"	Charli XCX	Music, Fashion, Film	Co-writer/co-producer	Cook, Charlotte Aitchison, Finn Keane	Cook, Keane
2026	"SS26"	Charli XCX	Music, Fashion, Film	Co-writer/co-producer	Cook, Charlotte Aitchison, Finn Keane	Cook, Keane
2026	"Card Declined"	Charli XCX	Music, Fashion, Film	Co-producer	Aitchison, Keane	Cook, Keane
2026	"Camera"	Charli XCX	Music, Fashion, Film	Co-producer	Aitchison, Keane	Cook, Keane
2026	"2007"	Charli XCX	Music, Fashion, Film	Co-writer/producer	Aitchison, Cook, Keane	Cook, Keane
2026	"I'm Afraid"	Charli XCX	Music, Fashion, Film	Co-producer	Aitchison, Keane	Cook, Keane
2026	"Yeah"	Charli XCX	Music, Fashion, Film	Co-writer/producer	Aitchison, Cook, Keane	Cook, Keane
2026	"Wink Wink"	Charli XCX	Music, Fashion, Film	Co-producer	Aitchison, Keane	Cook, Keane
2026	"Persona"	Charli XCX	Music, Fashion, Film	Co-writer/co-producer	Aitchison, Cook, Keane	Cook, Keane
2026	"Magic Metal Montana"	Charli XCX	Music, Fashion, Film	Co-writer/co-producer	Aitchison, Cook	Cook, Keane
2026	"No One Lasts Forever" (featuring David Cronenberg)	Charli XCX	Music, Fashion, Film	Co-writer/co-producer	Aitchison, Cook, Keane	Cook, Keane

== Mixes ==
Year	Title	Publisher
2012	"ILLAMASQUA 彩る MIX BY A. G. COOK"	Logo Magazine
2013	"CON/HAL x LOGO MIX BY A. G. COOK"	Logo Magazine
2013	"Radio Tank Mix: A. G. Cook"	Tank Magazine
2013	"Personal Computer Music"	DIS Magazine
2013	"A. G. COOK / CC MIX"	Creamcake
2014	"LUCKYME x RINSE 32 (ft A. G. COOK)"	LuckyMe Records
2014	"PC Music x DISown Radio (ft. A. G. Cook, GFOTY, Danny L Harle, Lil Data, Nu New Edition and Kane West)"	PC Music
2015	"A. G. Cook Boiler Room SXSW Mix"	Dailymotion × Ray-Ban
2015	"A. G. Cook and Life Sim - Xtreme Mixology"	PC Music
2018	"A. G. Cook - Hollywood Ambient"	NTS Radio Liminal Takeover
2018	"A. G. Cook - 05:00 05:05"	
2020	"A. G. Cook b2b umru at Square Garden"	Part of 100 gecs's Square Garden virtual music festival
2020	"Xperimental Traktor"	Club Quarantine × Namasenda Takeover
2020	"A. G. Cook - Secret Sky Acoustic EDM Set"	Live performance as part of Porter Robinson's Secret Sky virtual music festival
2021	"Dream Logic"	SoundCloud exclusive
