= PC Music discography =

Recordings catalog

The following is a comprehensive list of releases from British pop and electronic music record label PC Music.

== Releases ==
Year	Artist	Release	Type	Release date	Cat. number
2013	GFOTY	Bobby	Single^{^{[a]}}	June 25, 2013	pc-s1
2013	easyFun	easyFun EP	EP	June 25, 2013	pc-r1
2013	Princess Bambi	Less Love More Sex	Single^{^{[a]}}	June 23, 2013	pc-s2
2013	Dux Content	Like You	Single^{^{[a]}}	July 4, 2013	pc-s3
2013	Danny L Harle	Broken Flowers	Single^{^{[a]}}	July 15, 2013	pc-s4
2013	A. G. Cook	Nu Jack Swung	EP^{^{[a]}}	July 31, 2013	pc-r2
2013	Hannah Diamond	"Pink and Blue"	Single	October 30, 2013	pc-s5
2013	Dux Content	Lifestyle	Album^{^{[a]}}	November 28, 2013	pc-r3
2014	A. G. Cook featuring Hannah Diamond	Keri Baby	Single	January 14, 2014	pc-s6
2014	Maxo	Snow Other	Single^{^{[a]}}	February 9, 2014	pc-s7
2014	Hannah Diamond	Attachment	Single	April 23, 2014	pc-s8
2014	Lipgloss Twins	Wannabe	Single	April 23, 2014	pc-s9
2014	A. G. Cook	Beautiful	Single	June 4, 2014	pc-s10
2014	Tielsie	Palette	Single^{^{[a]}}	July 1, 2014	pc-s11
2014	GFOTY	Don't Wanna / Let's Do It	Single	July 9, 2014	pc-s12
2014	Kane West	Western Beats	EP	September 1, 2014	pc-r4
2014	Thy Slaughter	Bronze	Single	September 3, 2014	pc-s13
2014	Danny L Harle	In My Dreams	Single	October 8, 2014	pc-s14
2014	Lil Data	Sup	EP	October 22, 2014	pc-r5
2014	Hannah Diamond	Every Night	Single	November 24, 2014	PC001
2014	Spinee	Pretty Green	Single^{^{[a]}}	December 15, 2014	pc-s15
2015	A. G. Cook featuring Hannah Diamond	Drop FM	Single	February 19, 2015	pc-s16
2015	easyFun	Deep Trouble	EP	February 26, 2015	pc-r6
2015	Various Artists	PC Music Volume 1	Compilation	May 2, 2015 (Digital download, streaming); February 17, 2018 (Double LP (first edition)); December 14, 2018 (CD, double LP (second edition))	PCVOL1
2015	Dux Content	Snow Globe	Single^{^{[a]}}	June 1, 2015	pc-s17
2015	Life Sim	IDL	Single	September 10, 2015	PC002
2015	Hannah Diamond	Hi	Single	November 2, 2015	PC003
2015	Danny L Harle	Broken Flowers	EP	November 20, 2015	PC004
2015	Chris Lee (Li Yuchun)	Real Love / Only You	Single	December 14, 2015	PC005
2016	GFOTY	VIPOTY	EP	March 29, 2016	PC006
2016	Lipgloss Twins	Doodle	Single	April 14, 2016	pc-s18
2016	Danny L Harle featuring Caroline Polachek	Ashes of Love	Single	May 6, 2016	PC007
2016	A. G. Cook	Superstar	Single	July 13, 2016	PC008
2016	Danny L Harle featuring Carly Rae Jepsen	Super Natural	Single	August 16, 2016	PC009
2016	Hannah Diamond	Fade Away	Single	October 7, 2016	PC010
2016	felicita	a new family	EP	October 21, 2016	PC011
2016	GFOTY	Call Him A Doctor	EP	October 25, 2016	pc-r7
2016	easyFun featuring Noonie Bao	Monopoly	Single	November 15, 2016	PC012
2016	Various Artists	PC Music Volume 2	Compilation	November 18, 2016 (Digital download, streaming); February 17, 2018 (Double LP (first edition)); December 14, 2018 (CD, double LP (second edition))	PCVOL2
2016	Hannah Diamond	Make Believe	Single	December 22, 2016	PC013
2017	felicita	ecce homo	EP^{^{[a]}}	March 13, 2017	pc-r8
2017	Danny L Harle featuring Morrie	Me4U	Single	April 28, 2017	PC014
2017	Danny L Harle	1UL	Single	May 10, 2017	PC015
2017	Danny L Harle featuring Morrie	Me4U (A. G. Cook Remix)	Remix	May 17, 2017	PC014R
2017	Danny L Harle	1UL EP	EP	May 19, 2017	PC016
2017	Various Artists	Month of Mayhem	Compilation	July 28, 2017 (Digital download, streaming); December 14, 2018 (Picture disc double LP)	PC017
2017	GFOTY	Tongue	Single	November 19, 2017	PC018
2017	GFOTY	GFOTYBUCKS	Compilation	November 18, 2017 (Digital download, streaming, zine + CD)	PC019
2017	Hannah Diamond	Soon I won't see you at all	Mix^{^{[b]}}	December 13, 2017	pc-r9
2018	Tommy Cash	Pussy Money Weed	Single	January 23, 2018	PC020
2018	Danny L Harle featuring Clairo	Blue Angel	Single	February 8, 2018	PC021
2018	GFOTY	GFOTYBUCKS: RED CUPS	Remix EP	April 6, 2018	PCR10
2018	easyFun featuring Iiris	Be Your USA	Single	May 25, 2018	PC022
2018	Tommy Cash	Little Molly	Single	May 30, 2018	PC023
2018	felicita featuring Caroline Polachek	marzipan	Single	July 3, 2018	PC024
2018	felicita	coughing up amber / shook	Single	July 26, 2018	PC025
2018	felicita	hej!	Album	August 3, 2018	PC026
2018	Hannah Diamond	True	Single	November 16, 2018	PC027
2018	umru	search result	EP	November 23, 2018	PC028
2019	Lil Data	Burnnn	Single	February 8, 2019	PC029
2019	Lil Data	Folder Dot Zip	Compilation	February 16, 2019 (Digital download, streaming, USB album)	PC030
2019	A. G. Cook	Lifeline	Single	August 28, 2019	PC031
2019	Hannah Diamond & Danny L Harle	Part Of Me	Single	September 17, 2019	PC032
2019	Planet 1999	Spell	Single	September 5, 2019	PC033
2019	Hannah Diamond	Invisible	Single	October 30, 2019	PC034
2019	Hannah Diamond	Love Goes On	Single	November 13, 2019	PC035
2019	Hannah Diamond	Reflections	Album	November 22, 2019 (Digital download, streaming); December 19, 2019 (LP, deluxe LP); November 15, 2020 (Deluxe CD)	PC036
2019	Hannah Diamond	Reflections Instrumentals	Album^{^{[c]}}	November 22, 2019	—
2019	Namasenda	24/7	Single	December 3, 2019	PC037
2020	Planet 1999	Party	Single	January 22, 2020	PC038
2020	Hannah Diamond featuring Bladee	Love Goes On (Palmistry Remix)	Remix	February 20, 2020	PC035R
2020	Planet 1999	Replay	Single	February 14, 2020	PC039
2020	Planet 1999	Devotion	EP	March 6, 2020	PC040
2020	Hannah Diamond	Reflections Remixes	Remix EP	April 22, 2020	PC036R
2020	Namasenda	Dare AM	Single	April 29, 2020	PC041AM
2020	Namasenda	Dare PM	Single	April 29, 2020	PC041PM
2020	A. G. Cook	7G	Album	August 12, 2020 (Digital download, streaming); October 7, 2021 (CD)	PC042
2020	A. G. Cook	Oh Yeah	Single	August 20, 2020	PC0APPLE1
2020	A. G. Cook	Xxoplex	Single	September 3, 2020	PC0APPLE2
2020	A. G. Cook	Beautiful Superstar	Single	September 17, 2020; January 18, 2021 (LP)	PC0APPLE3
2020	A. G. Cook	Apple	Album	September 18, 2020 (Digital download, streaming); January 18, 2021 (LP)	PC0APPLE
2020	Various Artists	Appleville (Golden Ticket)	Compilation^{^{[c]}}	September 22, 2020	—
2020	Various Artists	Pop Crypt (Skeleton Key)	Compilation^{^{[c]}}	November 1, 2020	—
2020	Namasenda	Wanted	Single	November 12, 2020	PC043
2020	caro♡	hide me here	Single	November 25, 2020	PC044
2020	Various Artists	Pop Caroler's Songbook	Compilation^{^{[c]}}	November 1, 2020	—
2021	Planet 1999	Devotion (Deluxe)	EP	January 6, 2021 (Digital download, streaming); January 14, 2021 (CD + comic)	PC040D
2021	caro♡	sad song 77	Single	January 13, 2021	PC045
2021	Astra King	Silver	Single	March 5, 2021	PCX12
2021	Namasenda	Wanted (Kamixlo Remix)	Remix	March 9, 2021	PC043R
2021	A. G. Cook	Today (Dream Mix)	Single^{^{[a]}}	March 10, 2021	PCX13
2021	A. G. Cook	Dream Logic	Mix^{^{[a]}}	March 13, 2021	PCX14
2021	Namasenda	Wanted (Remixes)	Remix EP	March 22, 2021	PC043RR
2021	A. G. Cook	Beautiful Superstar (easyFun Remix)	Remix	April 9, 2021	PC0AXG1
2021	A. G. Cook	Oh Yeah (Caroline Polachek Remix)	Remix	April 16, 2021	PC0AXG2
2021	A. G. Cook	2021 (umru Remix)	Remix	April 22, 2021	PC0AXG3
2021	caro♡	heart in 2	Single	April 23, 2021	PC046
2021	A. G. Cook	The Darkness (Remix) (with Sarah Bonito & Hannah Diamond)	Remix	April 29, 2021	PC0AXG4
2021	A. G. Cook	Xcxoplex (with Charli XCX)	Remix	May 6, 2021	PC0AXG5
2021	A. G. Cook	Being Harsh (Oklou Cover)	Remix	May 20, 2021	PC0AXG6
2021	A. G. Cook	Windows (No Rome Remix)	Remix	May 27, 2021	PC0AXG7
2021	A. G. Cook	Apple vs. 7G	Remix album	May 28, 2021	PC0AXG
2021	caro♡	over u	Single	July 1, 2021	PC0CARO1
2021	Namasenda featuring La Zowi	Demonic	Single	July 22, 2021	PC0NAMA1
2021	caro♡	20k feet under	Single	August 5, 2021	PC0CARO2
2021	Namasenda featuring Mowalola	Banana Clip	Single	August 19, 2021	PC0NAMA2
2021	caro♡	Heartbeats/Heartbreaks	Album	September 3, 2021 (Digital download, streaming); April 4, 2022 (LP)	PCMCARO1
2021	Hyd	No Shadow	Single	September 9, 2021	PC0HYD1
2021	Namasenda featuring Joey LaBeija	Finish Him	Single	September 16, 2021	PC0NAMA3
2021	Hyd	Skin 2 Skin	Single	September 24, 2021	PC0HYD2
2021	umru featuring Tommy Cash & 645AR	check1	Single	October 1, 2021	PC0UMRU1
2021	Namasenda	No Regrets	Single	October 7, 2021	PC0NAMA4
2021	Hyd	The Look On Your Face	Single	October 14, 2021	PC0HYD3
2021	Namasenda	Unlimited Ammo	Mixtape	October 28, 2021 (Digital download, streaming); January 25, 2023 (LP); January 30, 2023 (CD)	PCMNAMA1
2021	Hyd	Hyd	EP	November 5, 2021 (Digital download, streaming); November 19, 2021 (LP); March 6, 2023 (CD)	PCMHYD1
2021	caro♡	20k feet under (Petal Supply Remix)	Remix	November 25, 2021	–
2021	caro♡	marseille (Simili Gum Remix)	Remix	November 25, 2021	–
2021	caro♡	heart in 2 (Cecile Believe Remix)	Remix	December 16, 2021	–
2021	caro♡	over u (Himera Remix)	Remix	December 16, 2021	–
2021	caro♡	Live at Pop Crypt	EP	December 30, 2021	PCMCARO2
2022	caro♡	Heartbeats/Heartbreaks Remixes	Remix EP	January 6, 2022	PCMCARO1R
2022	AFK	AFK	Single	January 13, 2022	PC0Ö1
2022	umru featuring Petal Supply & Rebecca Black	heart2	Single	January 20, 2022	PC0UMRU2
2022	Hyd	Into My Arms	Single	January 26, 2022	PC0HYD4
2022	Ö	Good Things on the Way	Single	February 11, 2022	PC0Ö2
2022	umru featuring Tony Velour, Fraxiom & Hannah Diamond	all i need	Single	February 18, 2022	PC0UMRU3
2022	Hannah Diamond	Staring at the Ceiling	Single	February 25, 2022	PC0HD1
2022	Ö	Hypernormality	EP	March 11, 2022	PCMÖ1
2022	umru	comfort noise	EP	March 25, 2022 (Digital download, streaming); November 23, 2022 (LP); March 6, 2023 (Deluxe CD)	PCMUMRU1
2022	Planet 1999	crush	Single	March 31, 2022	PC0PLNT1
2022	Namasenda	Unlimited Ammo : Infinity	Remix album	April 8, 2022	PCMNAMA1R
2022	easyFun	Audio	Single	April 21, 2022	PC0EASY1
2022	felicita featuring Kero Kero Bonito	Cluck	Single	May 13, 2022	PC0FEL1
2022	Various Artists	PC Music Volume 3	Compilation	May 13, 2022 (Digital download, streaming); June 20, 2022 (CD); August 1, 2022 (Double LP)	PCMVOL3
2022	Planet 1999	dune	Single	May 26, 2022	PC0PLNT2
2022	umru	heart2 (Lunice Remix)	Remix	June 16, 2022	PC0UMRUR1
2022	umru	honest (Himera Remix)	Remix	June 16, 2022	PC0UMRUR2
2022	Planet 1999	this is our music ♫	EP	June 24, 2022	PCMPLNT1
2022	Hyd	Afar	Single	July 14, 2022	PC0HYD5
2022	umru	honest (Jane Remover Remix)	Remix	July 21, 2022	PC0UMRUR3
2022	umru	check1 (six impala Remix)	Remix	July 21, 2022	PC0UMRUR4
2022	umru	comfort noise (Music Inspired by the Motion Picture)	Remix album	August 5, 2022 (Digital download, streaming); March 6, 2023 (Deluxe CD)	PCMUMRUR1
2022	felicita featuring YoungQueenz	Beast	Single	August 18, 2022	PC0FEL2
2022	Hyd	So Clear	Single	September 8, 2022	PC0HYD6
2022	Hyd	Breaking Ground	Single	September 29, 2022	PC0HYD7
2022	Hyd	Fallen Angel	Single	October 21, 2022	PC0HYD8
2022	Hyd	CLEARING	Album	November 11, 2022 (Digital download, streaming); March 6, 2023 (CD); March 11, 2023 (LP)	PCMHYD2 / PC0HYD9
2022	Hyd	So Clear (umru corrosion)	Remix	November 29, 2022	PC0HYDR1
2022	Holly Waxwing	Sister Species	Single	December 1, 2022	PC0HOL1
2022	Various Artists	Away From Keyboard [file not found]	Compilation^{^{[c]}}	December 11, 2022	–
2023	Holly Waxwing	Merry Christmas Mr. Lawrence	Single	December 15, 2022	PCX15
2023	Holly Waxwing	Meridians	Single	February 9, 2023	PC0HOL2
2023	umru & Warpstr	GROUNDBREAKER	Single	February 21, 2023	PC0UMRU4
2023	felicita featuring OhEm	Riff Raff	Single	March 2, 2023	PC0FEL3
2023	Holly Waxwing	Softcorners	Single	March 7, 2023	PC0HOL3
2023	Holly Waxwing	The New Pastoral	Album	March 10, 2023	PCMHOL1
2023	felicita featuring Caroline Polachek	Spalarkle (Alys)	Single	March 30, 2023	PC0FEL4
2023	DJ Warlord	Mystery Leopard Spins Tracks At Local Nightclub	EP^{^{[c]}}	April 7, 2023	PCX16
2023	felicita	Spalarkle	Album	May 5, 2023	PCMFEL1
2023	Astra King	Make Me Cry	Single	June 15, 2023	PC0KING1
2023	Astra King	First Love	EP	July 8, 2023	PCMKING1
2023	Hannah Diamond	Affirmations	Single	July 13, 2023	PC0HD2
2023	A. G. Cook	Beautiful (2023 Edit)	Single	July 28, 2023	PCX17
2023	caro♡	from the heart <3	Single	August 3, 2023	PC0CARO3
2023	EASYFUN	ELECTRIC	EP	August 11, 2023	PCMEASY1
2023	Hannah Diamond	Perfect Picture	Single	August 17, 2023	PC0HD3
2023	POBBLES	Another Pobbles Christmas	EP	August 20, 2023 (Digital download)^{^{[c]}} December 14, 2023 (Digital download, streaming)	PCX18
2023	caro♡	4ever1	Single	August 24, 2023	PC0CARO4
2023	caro♡	wild at ♡	Album	September 8, 2023	PCMCARO3
2023	Hannah Diamond	Poster Girl	Single	September 14, 2023	PC0HD4
2023	EASYFUN	Audio (All I Ever Got)	Single	September 28, 2023	PC0EASY2
2023	Hannah Diamond	Perfect Picture	Album	October 6, 2023 (Digital download, streaming); December 2, 2023 (LP)	PCMHD1
2023	EASYFUN	ACOUSTIC	EP	October 13, 2023	PCMEASY2
2023	Thy Slaughter	Sentence / If I Knew	Single	October 26, 2023	PC0THY1
2023	felicita	Spalarkle	Album	October 30, 2023 (Bonus tracks)	PCMFEL1B
2023	GRRL	Honeybee	Single	November 9, 2023	PC0GRRL1
2023	Thy Slaughter	Lost Everything / Reign	Single	November 16, 2023	PC0THY2
2023	Thy Slaughter	Soft Rock	Album	December 1, 2023 (Digital download, streaming); January 26, 2024 (CD, cassette); March 1, 2024 (LP)	PCMTHY1

Notes

All releases are available on streaming services, except the following with these notations:

- ^{^[a]} signifies a SoundCloud exclusive release
- ^{^[b]} signifies a YouTube exclusive release
- ^{^[c]} signifies a Bandcamp exclusive release
