= Thy Slaughter =

British musical duo

- Origin: United Kingdom
- Genres: Pop; experimental pop; electropop
- Years active: 2013–present
- Label: PC Music
- Members: A. G. Cook; Finn Keane
- Website: softrock.pcmusic.info

Thy Slaughter is a British musical duo formed in 2014 that consists of producers A. G. Cook and Finn Keane (formerly Easyfun) under Cook's label PC Music. In 2014, the duo released only one original song, "Bronze", which appeared on the label's debut compilation album the next year. They did not release any new music until their 2023 debut album Soft Rock, less than a month prior to the label switching to archival releases only.

The project was described by Stereogum as "faux-metal" in 2015. Clash said in 2023 that Thy Slaughter "revels in lawless pop futurism, embodying a truly boundary-less approach to neon-tinted sonic art," with "rock and pop aspects". Cook has cited rock bands such as Pixies, Nirvana, and the Strokes as influences for the project as well as Prince and Daft Punk.

== History ==
Keane has stated that he was friends with Cook since they were teenagers, with music being an "integral part" of that friendship.

=== 2013–2015: "Bronze", remixes and live performances ===
In 2014, the duo released their first song, "Bronze". This was included on PC Music Volume 1 the following year. Cook has since described the song as a "one-off", but has stated that it began to convince him to involve himself in "band music". Pitchfork pointed out the similarity of song's artwork to "a medallion unearthed from the ruins of ancient Greece or Rome", noting that this could be a "cheeky nod" at the label's perceived futurism, also noting the song's "escalating synth melody", "chirpy lyrical pleas" and the "brutal digital cave-in" at the end of the song. Dork described it as "a chirping, giddy slice of glee that wastes no time in introducing syrupy vocals and playful instrumentals before a burst of industrial doom."

The pair performed a short set at PC Music's Pop Cube in May 2015, featuring Dev Hynes on guitar. They released a few remixes, but did not release any more new music until 2023.

=== 2019–2024: Soft Rock ===
Cook has stated that though they had collaborated frequently on other projects since "Bronze", "it wasn't until 2019 that we realised [Thy Slaughter] might be an ideal vehicle for the sort of music that we wanted to hear."

The band released the double single consisting of songs "Sentence" and "If I Knew" in 2023, with vocals from Keane and Alaska Reid respectively. Thy Slaughter performed in September and October 2023 at events in Los Angeles and London to mark PC Music's tenth anniversary. The duo then announced their debut album, Soft Rock, in November, releasing a second double single of the songs "Lost Everything" and "Reign". "Lost Everything" features contributions from the late Sophie when work on the song began in 2016, as well as writing and vocals from Ellie Rowsell when the song was finished in 2022. The album was released on 1 December that year, in the final month before PC Music switched to archival releases, deliberately intended to mark a decade of the PC Music label. It featured vocals from Charli XCX, Caroline Polachek and Alaska Reid. The album's title was intended as a "contradiction", representing its music which contrasts the "sweet and sentimental" with the "ugly and disorienting". Dork said the album "stay[ed] true to PC Music's enduring legacy, but it constantly toy[ed] with expectations as well", and that it featured "live guitars, Nirvana-inspired imperfections, and twisting moments of industrial fear." Cook has referred to Soft Rock as "the perfect PC Music album."

Both Cook and Keane produced several songs on Charli XCX's 2024 album Brat as well as its remix album Brat and It's Completely Different but Also Still Brat. The duo played as Thy Slaughter at the PC Music Halloween event Pop Crypt II: Day & Night in October 2024, alongside Polachek and Reid.
