= Attachment (song) =

Single by Hannah Diamond
- Released: 23 April 2014
- Length: 4:19
- Label: PC Music
- Songwriters: Alexander Guy Cook; Hannah Amond
- Producer: A. G. Cook

Hannah Diamond singles chronology
"Keri Baby" (2014)	"Attachment" (2014)	"Every Night" (2014)

"Attachment" is a song by the English singer Hannah Diamond, released as a non-album single on 23 April 2014 through PC Music. It was written and produced by A. G. Cook. It later appeared on PC Music's first compilation album, PC Music Volume 1 (2015).

== Background ==
Hannah Diamond was one of the first members of PC Music, formed by A. G. Cook in 2013. She released her debut single, "Pink and Blue", that same year. Earlier in 2014, Diamond appeared as a feature in Cook's single "Keri Baby".
