= Every Night (Hannah Diamond song) =

Single by Hannah Diamond
- Released: 24 November 2014
- Genre: Dance-pop; synth-pop; hyperpop
- Length: 3:32
- Label: PC Music
- Songwriters: Alexander Guy Cook; Hannah Amond
- Producer: A. G. Cook

Hannah Diamond singles chronology
"Attachment" (2014)	"Every Night" (2014)	"Hi" (2015)

Audio video
- "Every Night" on YouTube

"Every Night" is a song by the English singer Hannah Diamond, released as a non-album single on 24 November 2014 through PC Music. Diamond joined PC Music in 2013 and released two solo singles before "Every Night". It was written by A. G. Cook and Diamond and produced by Cook. Critics described it as dance-pop and synth-pop, with Diamond's child-like vocals accompanied by pulsating beats. "Every Night" was PC Music's first commercially available single and later appeared on their first compilation album, PC Music Volume 1 (2015). It became Diamond's first song to appear on a Billboard chart.

== Background ==
Hannah Diamond was one of the first members of PC Music, formed by A. G. Cook in 2013. She released her debut single, "Pink and Blue", that same year. In 2014, Diamond appeared as a feature in Cook's single "Keri Baby" and released her second solo single, "Attachment". "Every Night" was her third solo single. It was written by Cook and Diamond. Additionally, Cook produced it.

== Composition ==
"Every Night" (2014)
Diamond's child-like vocals are accompanied by pulsating beats.

Critics described the song as dance-pop, synth-pop, and hyperpop. Sooanne Berner of Dazed called it a "pop banger", while Spin's Dan Weiss wrote that it is a "pop anthem". Trevor Anderson of Billboard compared its "bubbly, electronic vibe" to "All About That Bass" by Meghan Trainor and "Call Me Maybe" by Carly Rae Jepsen, while Alex Chapman of Interview felt its production was similar to La Bouche's. Stereogum's Tom Breihan compared it to Gina G's "Ooh Aah... Just a Little Bit". Chapman said that it is simultaneously "adorable and danceable", describing its vibe as "bright and sunny", while Exclaim!'s Sarah Murphy called it "sunshine-y".

Critics described the beat as pulsating. Colin Joyce of Pitchfork added that the song is built on a sweet synth loop, while The Guardian's Ben Beaumont-Thomas felt the synths were J-pop-like. Noah Simon of The Line of Best Fit said the song contains "vibrant, bubbly synths" and "stocky drum sounds". According to DIY, the song contains "thudding Ibiza-ready pads and enough hooks to break the internet". Tobias Norström of Café described the song as "pure adrenaline". Pitchfork's Chal Ravens noted the song's usage of the supersaw waveform. Jia Tolentino of the same website also noted its "pastel jelly-bean melodies".

Diamond's vocals are child-like and staccato while supported by "oh-ooh-oh" harmonies. Simon described Diamond's performance as "robotic yet emotionally resonant" while presenting "crafty vocal chopping". According to Joyce, its lyrics describe how physical attraction can influence romantic relations. He felt that the lyrics are "a little more bizarre and self-reflexive than your typical tale of romantic pining", while Angus Finlayson of Resident Advisor wrote that there is a "surprising complexity beneath the cutesy delivery", as the song shows romance as a bewildering loop. Rolling Stone's Jon Dolan described the song as "tween-dream surrealism".

== Release and reception ==
"Every Night" was released on 24 November 2014 through PC Music. It was the label's first commercially available single on iTunes. Within two weeks, "Every Night" received almost 200,000 plays on SoundCloud, and became Diamond's first song to appear on a Billboard chart, reaching number 28 on the Emerging Artists chart. It later appeared on PC Music's first compilation album, PC Music Volume 1 (2015).

Pitchfork gave it their "Best New Track" accolade. The Line of Best Fit's Laurence Day described it as "melodic, infectious and abrasive", while Sarah Murphy of Exclaim! wrote that it is a "frustratingly catchy tune". Ryan Bassil of Vice said that it is more bold, confident, and universal when compared to Diamond's earlier songs; he called it "the sound of falling for someone". Trevor Anderson of Billboard wrote that it was the song that most captured pop music's essence that year, while Finlayson said that it "[satisfies] in the way that pop has always satisfied, no more and no less". Simon said that the song is "as PC Music as you can get", "[providing] that cathartic, PC Music pop bliss". Beaumont-Thomas described it as "the smartest dumb music out there". A Beat writer felt it was unexciting, comparing it negatively to another PC Music single, "Hey QT". The Forty-Five's Sophie Walker named it the 44th best hyperpop song of all time.
