= Beautiful (A. G. Cook song) =

Single by A. G. Cook
- Released: 4 June 2014
- Genre: Hyperpop
- Length: 3:47
- Label: PC Music
- Songwriter: Alexander Guy Cook
- Producer: A. G. Cook

A. G. Cook singles chronology
"Keri Baby" (2014)	"Beautiful" (2014)	"Drop FM" (2015)

"Beautiful" (2014)
"Beautiful" is an extreme, high-pitched take on pop music. Its repeated hook touches on the concept of eternity, a common motif in PC Music's songs.

"Beautiful" is a song by the English producer A. G. Cook. It was released on 4 June 2014 through PC Music. It later appeared on PC Music's compilation album PC Music Volume 1 (2015). In December 2014, Rustie released a remix of the song. In 2023, A. G. Cook released an edit of the song.

Cook said that "Beautiful" is "quite a chaotic, stream of consciousness track, tying together a bunch of styles and references using a very straightforward vocal hook". He said the song "[plays]" with the balance of songwriting and production and sort of destabilising that balance or not taking the art form too seriously".

It was named one of the best tracks of the year by Pitchfork and Fact. Tiny Mix Tapes named it one of the best songs of the decade. NME named it one of PC Music's essential tracks. The Forty-Five's Sophie Walker named it the 23rd best hyperpop song of all time.

In 2020, Cook released the song "Beautiful Superstar" as a single from his second studio album Apple; the song title is a reference to "Beautiful" and his 2016 single "Superstar".
