= Perfect Picture (album) =

Studio album by Hannah Diamond
- Released: 6 October 2023
- Genre: Hyperpop
- Length: 40:37
- Label: PC Music
- Producer: David Gamson; Guy Sigsworth

Hannah Diamond chronology
Reflections (2019)	Perfect Picture (2023)

Singles from Perfect Picture
- 1. "Staring at the Ceiling" Released: 24 February 2022; 2. "Affirmations" Released: 13 July 2023; 3. "Perfect Picture" Released: 17 August 2023; 4. "Poster Girl" Released: 14 September 2023

Perfect Picture is the second studio album by the English singer and visual artist Hannah Diamond. It was released on 6 October 2023 via PC Music, one of the final releases on the label before its closure at the end of 2023.

The album was made in collaboration with American musician David Gamson, whom she met in 2016 when PC Music traveled to Los Angeles for their Pop City event.

It was supported by the singles "Staring at the Ceiling", "Affirmations", the album's title track, and "Poster Girl".

== Release ==
On 24 February 2022, she released "Staring At The Ceiling", the lead single for an upcoming album. More than a year later, a new single was released under the title of "Affirmations". In mid-August, the title track "Perfect Picture" was released on 17 August and came with the announcement of the album of the same title.

This was followed by "Poster Girl" in mid-September. The announcement was met with accusations that Diamond copied Swedish singer Zara Larsson's cover art for the album of the same name. Diamond addressed this, stating that "there is no joy to be found in using someone else’s experience", and affirmed the legacy and influence her own photography and art from PC Music have had on culture.

== Tour ==
Diamond will embark on a tour supporting the album in North America, Canada and Europe from October through to December 2023. The tour was announced on 28 July after the release of the single Affirmations. On 24 August she announced the dates for Barcelona and Berlin. The last update to date took place in 30 August when she announced shows in Warsaw and Helsinki.

== Critical reception ==
Professional ratings
Aggregate scores
Source	Rating
Metacritic	78/100
Review scores
Source	Rating
Clash	8/10
DIY	4/5 stars
The Line of Best Fit	9/10
Pitchfork	7.8/10
Slant Magazine	4/5 stars

Perfect Picture received a score of 78 out of 100 on review aggregator Metacritic based on 7 critics' reviews, indicating "generally favorable reviews". Steve Erickson of Slant Magazine wrote that "lyrically, the songs on Perfect Picture find [Diamond] in a constant state of anxiety about her looks and public perception" and she "constructs a world of exaggerated femininity without drowning in irony". DIY's Otis Robinson called it "the pinnacle of today's hyperpop yet steers away from its once abrasive nature towards a well-rounded, rebooted version: one where all that Hannah is and can be is indeed made picture perfect". Peyton Toups, reviewing the album for Pitchfork, wrote that it "embraces a blurrier resolution where pitch-shifted vocals glitch in and out of static and punchy, arpeggiated synths leap into massive choruses".

Matthew Kent of The Line of Best Fit felt that Perfect Picture is more successful at capturing who Diamond is as an artist than her previous work and "speaks volumes to her work across the digital landscape cementing her status as a cult icon behind both the camera and a microphone". Reviewing the album for Clash, Bryson Edward Howe commented that it "still evokes the half-remembered sound of worn-out Spice Girls cassettes, coated in the same plastic gloss as the posters adorning bedroom walls, but navigates a more complex interplay between the different brands of nostalgia within a typically kaleidoscopic soundscape".

The Guardian ranked it the 46th best album of 2023.

== Track listing ==
All music is composed by Hannah Amond and David Gamson.

Perfect Picture track listing
No.	Title	Lyrics	Length
1.	"Perfect Picture"	Hannah Amond; David Gamson; Alexander Guy Cook	2:49
2.	"Affirmations"	Amond; Gamson; Nate Campany	3:34
3.	"Poster Girl"	Amond; Gamson; Oscar Pollock	3:43
4.	"Want You to Know"	Amond; Gamson; Kesha Sebert; Miriam Nervo; Olivia Nervo	3:24
5.	"Impossible"	Amond; Gamson; Cook; Finn Keane; Campany	3:27
6.	"Flashback"	Amond; Gamson; Sigsworth	3:41
7.	"No FX"	Amond; Gamson; Cecile Believe	3:35
8.	"Lip Sync"	Amond; Gamson; Believe; Marcus Andersson	3:11
9.	"Staring at the Ceiling"	Amond; Gamson; Jennifer Decilveo	3:43
10.	"Twisted"	Amond; Gamson; Believe	3:16
11.	"Divisible by Two"	Amond; Gamson; Believe	3:35
12.	"Unbreakable"	Amond; Gamson; Pollock	2:33
Total length:			40:37

Notes

- "Want You to Know" interpolates an unreleased demo titled "Do You Wanna Know", performed by Kesha.

== Personnel ==
- Hannah Diamond – vocals, artwork
- David Gamson – production (all tracks), mixing (tracks 4–6, 11, 12)
- Guy Sigsworth – production (6)
- Stuart Hawkes – mastering
- Clint Gibbs – mixing (1–3, 7, 8, 10)
- Geoff Swan – mixing (9)

== Charts ==
Chart performance for Perfect Picture
Chart (2023)	Peak position
UK Album Downloads (OCC)	69

== Release history ==
Release history and formats for Perfect Picture
Region	Date	Format	Label	Ref.
Various	6 October 2023	Digital download; streaming	PC Music	
Various	2 December 2023	LP	PC Music	
