= PC Music Volume 2 =

Compilation album by various artists
- Released: 18 November 2016
- Genres: Hyperpop; Electropop; synth-pop
- Length: 38:08
- Label: PC Music

PC Music chronology
PC Music Volume 1 (2015)	PC Music Volume 2 (2016)	Month of Mayhem (2018)

PC Music Volume 2 is the second compilation album by British record label PC Music, released on 18 November 2016.

== Composition ==
Described as an electropop, synth-pop, and "house-fueled" album, PC Music Volume 2 features the group's trademark "marriage of pop hooks, rubbery synths, and beguiling female vocals," as well as "a mix of styles appropriated from both the dance underground and Top 40". Many of the songs feature an "allergy" to the polyrhythms typical in dance music, like on "Super Natural" "where beats, hand claps, and screamingly dense Eurodance keyboards are all pulsing at you as one".

=== Songs ===
The opener "Fade Away" has been described as "immensely satisfying trance-pop".

"Super Natural" features Canadian singer Carly Rae Jepsen, a choice that was noted for breaking the mould in comparison to the "often metallicized" and manipulated vocals usually present on PC Music songs.

GFOTY's song "Poison" introduced nu-rave and industrial elements to the label's sound.

"A New Family" by Felicita features "horror-film whispers emerging from underneath the sort of crunchy torrent of sound favored by so-called post-club producers."

Hannah Diamond's "Hi" was praised for its "restrained" sound and proving "that PC Music wheelhouse is far larger than just chrome-painted dance pop."

== Critical reception ==
Professional ratings
Aggregate scores
Source	Rating
Metacritic	79/100
Review scores
Source	Rating
The Guardian	5/5 stars
The Line of Best Fit	7/10
Pitchfork	6.2/10
Resident Advisor	3.5/5

PC Music Volume 2 received a score of 79 out of 100 from review aggregate site Metacritic, indicating "generally favourable reviews". Rachel Aroesti of The Guardian gave the collection a perfect score, and said that following the hype of Volume 1 "this second compilation provides an opportunity to appreciate the music on its own terms – and it feels more beautiful and progressive than ever before." Grand Rindner of The Line of Best Fit praised the album for expanding upon the collective's signature sound in new directions. Rich Juzwiak of Spin praised it for being "more mature, less obnoxious, and much more deserving of the early hype PC Music received" and "actual songs" as opposed to its irony-laden predecessor.

Conversely, Thea Ballard of Pitchfork felt "worn out" by the compilation, but singled out "Only You" and "Broken Flowers" as highlights.

== Track listing ==
No.	Title	Artist	Length
1.	"Fade Away"	Hannah Diamond	4:15
2.	"Super Natural" (featuring Carly Rae Jepsen)	Danny L Harle	3:43
3.	"Superstar"	A. G. Cook	4:51
4.	"Monopoly" (featuring Noonie Bao)	Easyfun	3:10
5.	"Poison"	GFOTY	2:46
6.	"A New Family"	Felicita	3:50
7.	"Hi"	Hannah Diamond	3:24
8.	"Broken Flowers"	Danny L Harle	3:23
9.	"Only You"	Chris Lee	2:59
10.	"IDL"	Life Sim	5:53
