= Keri Baby =

Single by A. G. Cook featuring Hannah Diamond
- Released: 23 April 2014
- Length: 2:08
- Label: PC Music
- Songwriters: Alexander Guy Cook; Hannah Amond
- Producer: A. G. Cook

A. G. Cook singles chronology
"Keri Baby" (2014)	"Beautiful" (2014)

Hannah Diamond singles chronology
"Pink and Blue" (2013)	"Keri Baby" (2014)	"Attachment" (2014)

"Keri Baby" is the debut single by the English producer A. G. Cook featuring English singer Hannah Diamond. It was released through PC Music on 23 April 2014. The single later appeared on PC Music's first compilation album, PC Music Volume 1. It was written by both Cook and Diamond and produced by Cook. The songs instrumentation was described by Dazed as "springy, restless, and ridiculously overloaded". It was listed as one of the best songs of the year by Brooklyn Magazine, DMY, and Dazed.

== Background ==
Hannah Diamond was one of the first members of PC Music, formed by A. G. Cook in 2013. She released her debut single, "Pink and Blue", that same year. Earlier in 2014, Diamond appeared as a feature in Cook's single "Keri Baby".
