= Hannah Diamond =

British musician and artist (born 1991)

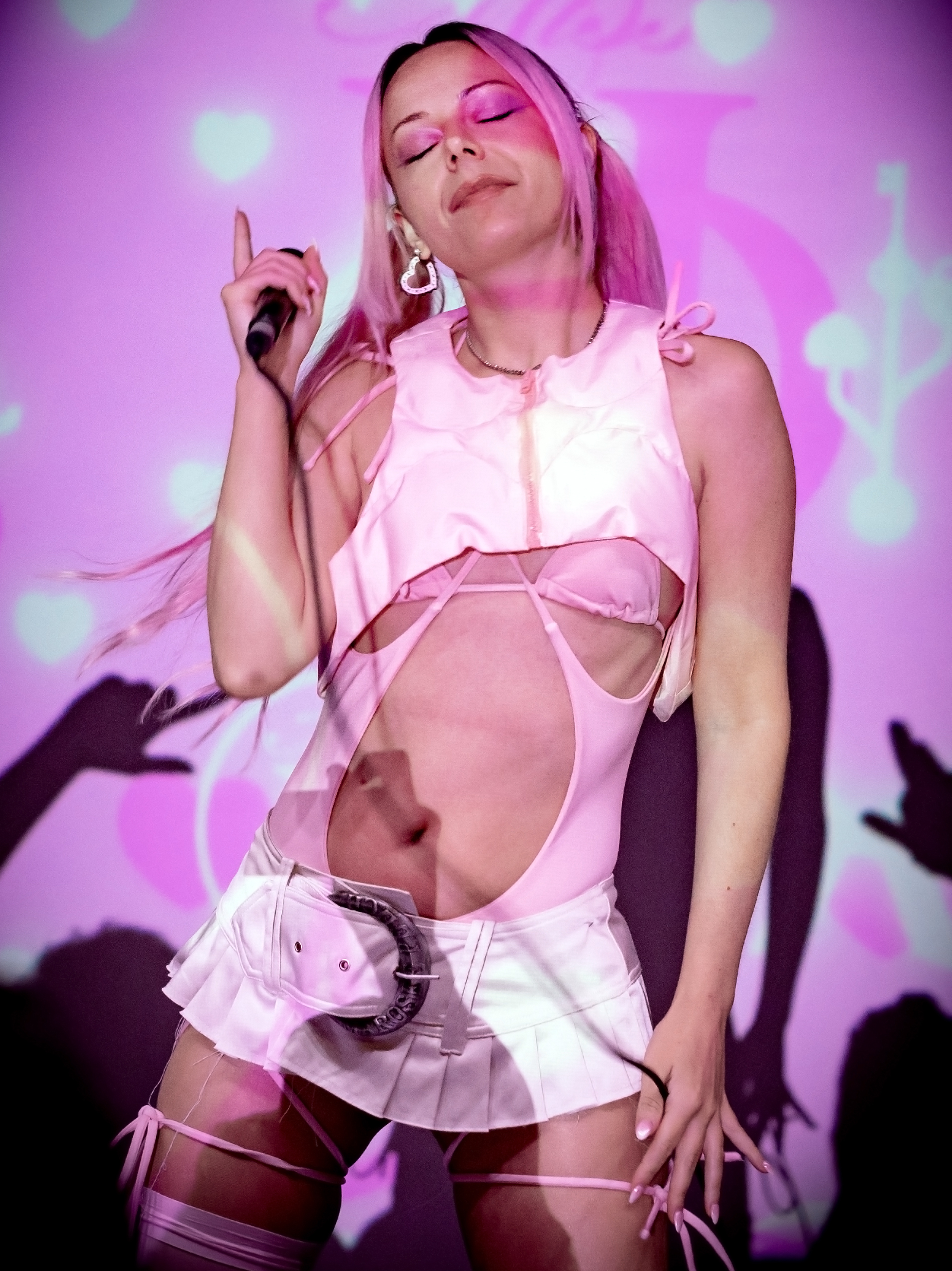
- Diamond performing at the Moroccan Lounge in Los Angeles, 2023

Background information
- Born: Hannah Marie Amond; 20 June 1991 (age 35); Norwich, England
- Genres: Pop; trance; hyperpop; bubblegum bass
- Occupations: Singer; songwriter; photographer; visual artist
- Instrument: Vocals
- Years active: 2012–present
- Label: PC Music
- Website: studio.hannahdiamond.com

Hannah Marie Amond (born 20 June 1991), known professionally as Hannah Diamond, is an English singer, songwriter, photographer, and visual artist. She has recorded on A.G. Cook's PC Music label since 2013, beginning with her debut single "Pink and Blue". Her music and visual art employs an aesthetic of hyperreality and heavily produced cuteness in tension with sincerity.

Diamond released her debut studio album, Reflections, in November 2019, followed by her second studio album, Perfect Picture, in October 2023. She also works as a photographer, producing visual artwork and promotional materials for herself as well as other artists and publications.

== Music career ==
=== 2012–2015: Beginnings ===
Diamond met GFOTY through a friend, and GFOTY introduced her to A. G. Cook. After a vocalist failed to show up to a session with Cook, the two worked on their first musical collaboration. In 2012, they recorded Diamond's first solo song, titled "Attachment". Diamond released her debut single "Pink and Blue" through PC Music in October 2013. The song resembles a lullaby, with a harshly synthetic quality. The attention received by "Pink and Blue" helped to introduce the fledgling label, and it placed 5th on Fact's list of "The 100 best tracks of the decade so far".

The following January, Diamond appeared on A. G. Cook's "Keri Baby". The song toyed with the idea of Diamond as an MP3 file or a digital entity on a screen. Diamond made her first live performance in April, at Basement in London. She released "Attachment" as her second single later that month. "Attachment" is a melancholy ballad about modern relationships, with a high-pitched melody backed by farcical harmonies.

"Every Night" (2014)
Diamond's singing is exaggeratedly innocent and infantilised.

Diamond's third solo single "Every Night" was released in November 2014 and became PC Music's first single available through the iTunes Store. The song discusses feelings of desire and showcases a more bold personality than Diamond's earlier songs. Her vocals are childlike and staccato, supported by "oh-ooh-oh" harmonies. The production drew comparisons to La Bouche and "Call Me Maybe" by Carly Rae Jepsen. "Every Night" received nearly 200,000 plays on SoundCloud within two weeks, and it became Diamond's first song to appear on a Billboard chart, reaching 28th on the Emerging Artists chart.

March 2015 saw Diamond head to the US to play the PC Music showcase at the Empire Garage in Austin, Texas as part of SXSW. Her performance was very well received with The Guardian calling it a "well-crafted performance, as much about the aesthetic and choreography as the camp songs" and according to Flavorwire was the one "who impressed the most." On 8 May 2015, Diamond performed as part of a PC Music show at BRIC House in Brooklyn, New York as part of the Red Bull Music Academy Festival. The show was billed as the premiere of Pop Cube, "a multimedia reality network". In November 2015, Diamond released her song "Hi" with a music video made in conjunction with i-D magazine. With the resources to produce her first music video, she chose 'Hi' as a way to wrap up her earlier material and serve as a good introduction to her next phase. Diamond had begun recording a full-length album, originally planned for release in 2015.

=== 2016–2021: Reflections ===
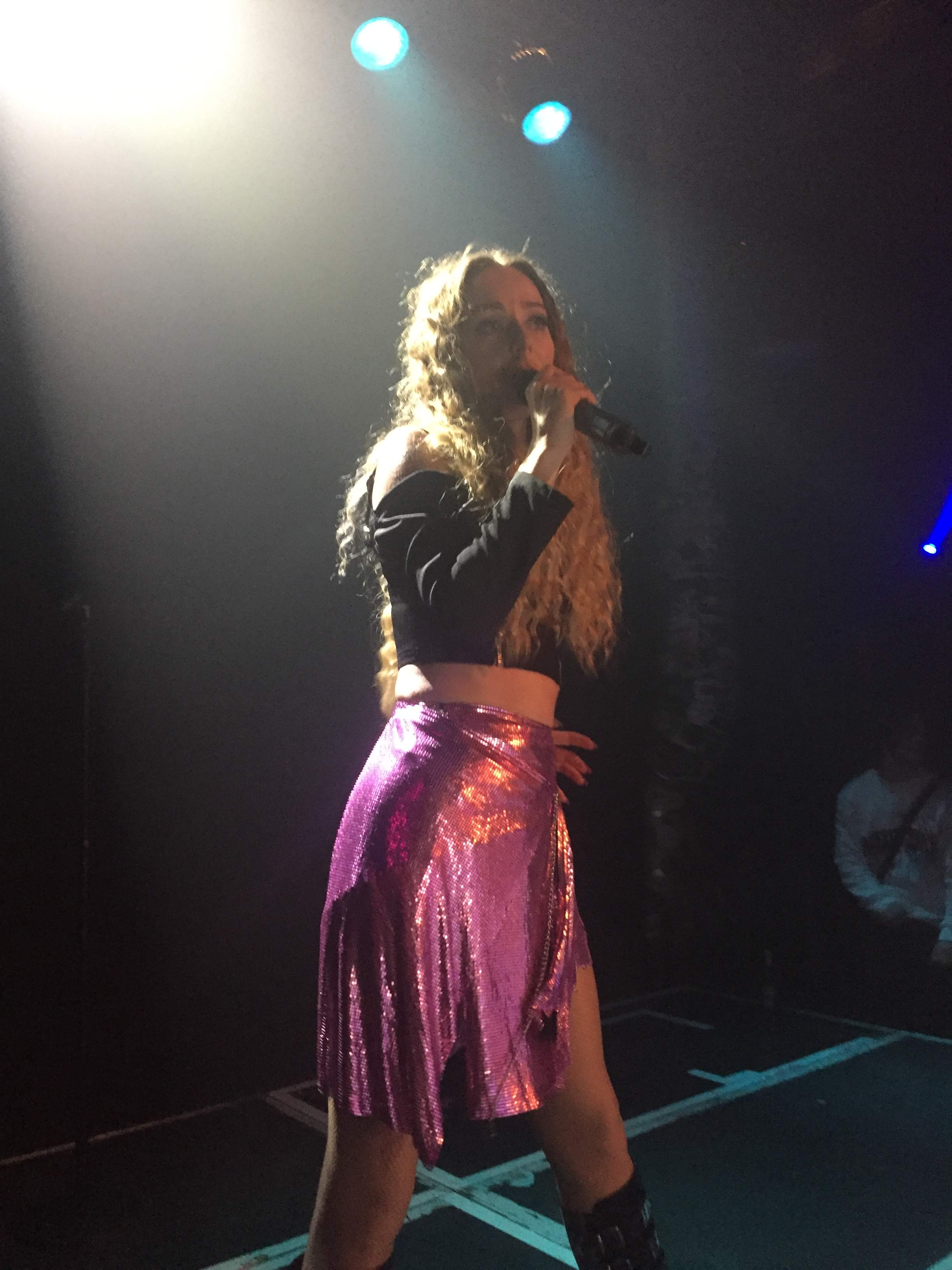
Hannah Diamond performing in Amsterdam in February 2020

February 2016 saw Hannah Diamond collaborate with Charli XCX on a new track titled "Paradise", which featured on XCX's Vroom Vroom EP, the first release on XCX's label Vroom Vroom Recordings. According to the singer, the label will combine her "love for bubblegum pop with mystery and darkness." In October that year, Diamond released the new single "Fade Away" with a lyric video via PC Music. On 22 December 2016, Diamond released a free single, "Make Believe", which was produced by easyFun and A.G. Cook.

On 13 December 2017, she released a new mix, Soon I won't see you at all, which contains three new tracks, one of which is a cover of "Concrete Angel" by Gareth Emery. It was made available on YouTube for streaming with a link to a ZIP file of the mix in the description. On 16 November 2018, Diamond released "True", which is the lead single from her debut album Reflections.

On 17 September 2019, Diamond released the song "Part of Me" with Danny L Harle. Just over a month later, on 30 October, Diamond released the single "Invisible" with its accompanying music video. With this release, she also announced the release date for Reflections and revealed the album artwork. On 13 November, Diamond released another single leading up to the release of her album, titled "Love Goes On". The song was released with an accompanying music video. On 31 October, she announced her first headlining tour "The Invisible Tour", which was set to begin on 4 December, but she added new dates on 1, 4, and 28 November. Her debut album Reflections was released on November 22, and the tracklist was revealed the day before. On 5 February 2020, she announced that she would be the opening act in 4 shows for Carly Rae Jepsen's Dedicated Tour. The Reflections remix album was released in April 2020, and the vinyl was released in early 2020.

In 2020, Diamond featured on the remix for 100 gecs' "xXXi_wud_nvrstøp_ÜXXx" alongside Estonian rapper Tommy Cash, and appeared on A. G. Cook's two 2020 albums 7G and Apple. In 2021, Diamond appeared on the Danny L Harle single, "Boing Beat", from his debut album Harlecore, and featured on the remix for A. G. Cook's "The Darkness", alongside Sarah Bonito of Kero Kero Bonito. She appeared on labelmate Namasenda's debut Unlimited Ammo mixtape in October 2021, and designed much of the project's single and album artwork.

=== 2022–present: Perfect Picture ===
Diamond begun teasing a second album in mid-2021 via social media. After debuting a new song at PC Music's Pitchfork Music Festival London showcase and previewing it on TikTok, Diamond released the single "Staring at the Ceiling" on 24 February 2022. A year later, she released "Affirmations" as the second single from the album. "Perfect Picture" was released as the third single on 17 August. The same day, her second album with the same name was announced for release on 6 October.

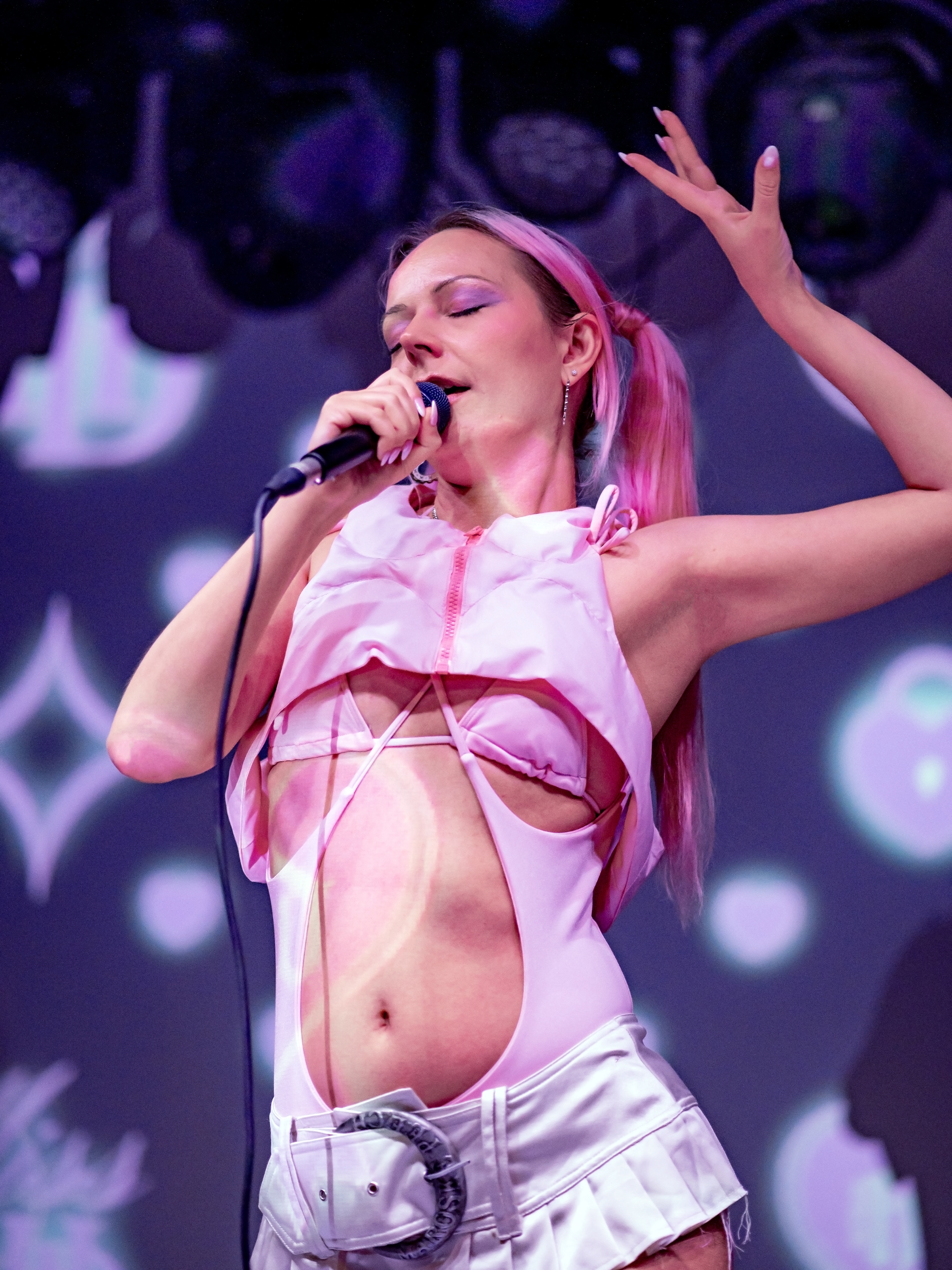
Hannah Diamond performing at the Moroccan Lounge in October 2023

The fourth single, "Poster Girl", was released on 14 September 2023. The announcement was met with accusations that Diamond copied Swedish singer Zara Larsson's cover art for the album of the same name. Diamond addressed this, stating that "there is no joy to be found in using someone else's experience", and affirmed the legacy and influence her own photography and art from PC Music have had on culture.

Perfect Picture marked a departure from the hopeless sound presented on Reflections, with Pitchfork author Peyton Toups writing "As Diamond steers away from the icy, sad-girl trappings of her earlier work, she morphs into a more upbeat, motivational pop star".

== Visual artistry ==
Growing up, Diamond followed the work of fashion photographers such as Mert and Marcus, David LaChapelle, and Nick Knight. She studied fashion communication and styling, and her early work focused on internet celebrities. She is a member of Diamond Wright, which has made promotional images for QT, latex clothing brand Meat, and PC Music artist Princess Bambi. In 2015, she shot Charli XCX in global commercial campaigns for Boohoo and Lynx Impulse. Before the founding of PC Music, Diamond worked with Cook on marketing material for makeup brand Illamasqua. She has also done work as co-editor and director of photography for LOGO Magazine.

She cited the futuristic visuals for TLC's "Waterfalls" music video as influential for their emphasis on technology. Diamond's music is often inspired by high-definition imagery and fashion campaigns. Cook describes her as an artist "in control of [her] own image", noting Diamond's involvement in producing the promotional material. Her cover artwork uses heavy photo retouching to produce unnatural, hyperreal versions of herself. The covers show Diamond in front of empty, one-dimensional spaces. Her outfits are influenced by London streetwear, and she is known for wearing her trademark pastel pink puffer jacket. January 2016 saw Diamond feature on the cover of OKgrl, a new online platform created by stylist Louby Mcloughlin & DVTK, the ex digital directors of fashion brand Kenzo. Diamond has also spent time designing typefaces, including a new font which was featured in the lyric video for her song, "True".

As a photographer, Diamond's work includes a 2018 cover feature for DIY, featuring Years & Years' Olly Alexander. Diamond shot Sophia Webster's Spring/Summer 2019 campaign, the cover feature of the second issue of the French magazine Jalouse, which features Migos rapper Offset, and a L'Officiel editorial for Charli XCX promoting her new album Charli.

In 2020, Diamond took over a creative director position for UK alt-pop band Sundara Karma. Along with the band's frontman Oscar Pollock, she co-directed the music video for their single "Kill Me", In addition to making a series of promotional graphics, including the single artwork. Shots from their visual collaboration were featured on the cover of DIY magazine in 2019.

== Discography ==
Hannah Diamond discography
- Studio albums: 2
- EPs: 2
- Singles: 14

=== Studio albums ===
Title	Album details
Reflections	Released: 22 November 2019; Label: PC Music; Formats: LP, CD, digital download, streaming
Perfect Picture	Released: 6 October 2023; Label: PC Music; Formats: LP, digital download, streaming

=== Extended plays ===
Title	EP details
Reflections Remixes	Released: 22 April 2020; Label: PC Music; Formats: Digital download, streaming
Reflections Hard Drive	Released: 24 November 2020; Label: PC Music; Formats: Digital download

=== Singles ===
==== As lead artist ====
Title	Year	Album
"Pink and Blue"	2013	Non-album single
"Attachment"	2014	PC Music Volume 1
"Every Night"	2014	PC Music Volume 1
"Hi"	2015	PC Music Volume 2
"Fade Away"	2016	Reflections
"Make Believe"	2016	Reflections
"True"	2018	Reflections
"Part of Me" (with Danny L Harle)	2019	Non-album single
"Invisible"	2019	Reflections
"Love Goes On"	2019	Reflections
"The Darkness" (Remix) (with A. G. Cook and Sarah Bonito)	2021	Apple vs. 7G
"Staring at the Ceiling"	2022	Perfect Picture and PC Music Volume 3
"Affirmations"	2023	Perfect Picture
"Perfect Picture"	2023	Perfect Picture
"Poster Girl"	2023	Perfect Picture

==== As featured artist ====
Title	Year	Album
"Keri Baby" (A. G. Cook featuring Hannah Diamond)	2014	PC Music Volume 1
"Drop FM" (A. G. Cook featuring Hannah Diamond)	2015	Non-album single
"All I Need" (Umru, Fraxiom, and Tony Velour featuring Hannah Diamond)	2022	Comfort Noise
"Angel" (Donatachi featuring Hannah Diamond)	2025	Non-album single

=== Other appearances ===
Title	Year	Other artist(s)	Album
"Close Your Eyes"	2013	A. G. Cook	Nu Jack Swung
"What I Mean"	2014	A. G. Cook	Non-album single
"Paradise"	2016	Charli XCX	Vroom Vroom
"Out Of My Head REMIX"	2017	A. G. Cook, Mykki Blanco, Dorian Electra, Tommy Cash	Non-album single
"Cool 3D World"	2018	Tommy Cash	¥€$
"xXXi_wud_nvrstøp_ÜXXx (Remix)"	2020	100 Gecs, Tommy Cash	1000 gecs and the Tree of Clues
"Acid Angel"	2020	A. G. Cook	7G
"DJ Every Night"	2020	A. G. Cook	7G
"Alright"	2020	A. G. Cook	7G
"The Darkness"	2020	A. G. Cook	Apple
"Acoustic Angel"	2020	—N/a	Appleville (Golden Ticket)
"Where Are You Christmas?"	2020	—N/a	Pop Caroler's Songbook
"Boing Beat"	2021	Danny L Harle, MC Boing	Harlecore
"Play With My Heart"	2021	—N/a	Tetris Beat - Essentials, Vol. 1
"Steel"	2021	Namasenda	Unlimited Ammo
"Candyboy (Hannah Diamond's Shine)"	2021	Casey MQ	Babycasey: Ultra
"Better Than That"	2021	Erika de Casier, caro♡	The Sensational Remixes
"Kiss"	2022	Himera	Sharing Secrets
"Always and Forever"	2024	Sophie	Sophie

== Tours ==
=== Headlining ===
- The Invisible Tour (2019–2020)
- Affirmations Tour (2023)

=== Opening act ===
- Carly Rae Jepsen – The Dedicated Tour (2020)
