= Planet 1999 =

French band

- Origin: London, England
- Genres: Shoegaze; synth-pop; dream pop; bedroom pop
- Years active: 2018–present
- Label: PC Music
- Members: Caroline Beatrix Maurin; Alexandre Teiller; Charles Teiller
- Website: https://www.planet1999.com/

Planet 1999 is a French synth-pop and shoegaze band based in London. The group consists of members Caro, Alex, and Charles, who also operate as solo acts under the names ultra caro, DJ Kit (formerly City Links), and Ultralove, respectively. They were the first band to be signed to the record label PC Music. They also occasionally act as songwriters and record producers for other artists.

Alex described the defining characteristics of their music as a "minimalistic shoegaze loop with over-processed vocals on top of it." The band has cited many shoegaze and krautrock artists as their inspirations. Often featured in Planet 1999's visuals is a mascot named Zippy which was designed by artist Leomi Sadler.

== History ==
Alex and Charles are brothers and previously have made music together. Caro was born in Marseille but grew up further east along the coast and made music mostly on her own. They met after Caro attended a psychedelic rock concert in Paris and found a flyer from Charles and Alex saying they were looking for a singer. Together they formed the now defunct Dead Sea group with Julien Moreno. They were signed to PIAS Recordings, and released a handful of singles, as well as an EP titled Colorate in May 2018.

In late 2018, Caro, Alex and Charles emailed A. G. Cook, head of record label PC Music, and after meeting with him were eventually signed to the label.

Cook introduced Charli XCX to Planet 1999's music which led to them co-producing Charli XCX's song "February 2017" and Nasty Cherry's "What Do You Like In Me?". Planet 1999 also composed the score to the Netflix series about Nasty Cherry's come up.

Planet 1999 released their debut single "Spell" in September 2019. In November 2019, they performed at fellow PC Music artist Hannah Diamond's concert in Paris during The Invisible Tour. In early 2020, Planet 1999 released two more singles, "Party" and "Replay", "Party" was accompanied by a video featuring their mascot Zippy. Later in the year they released their EP "Devotion" in March 2020. The group has named artists Cocteau Twins, Hannah Diamond, Frank Ocean, Croatian Amor, and Uli K as some of the biggest inspirations for the project. In January 2021, they released a deluxe version of the EP, featuring 3 new remixes. This came with a CD release.

In August 2020, the band was featured on the song "Everyday, Everynight" by Anamanaguchi.

In November 2020, Caro began releasing solo material under the moniker ultra caro (formerly caro♡). She released her debut album Heartbeats/Heartbreaks in September 2021. It was released alongside a Bandcamp exclusive bonus demo album titled the lost logic files vol.1. A remix EP was released in January 2022, featuring remixes from PC Music affiliates Lil Data, Cecile Believe, Himera, Count Baldor, and more.

In May 2021, Planet 1999 produced for Australian singer Banoffee's single "Tapioca Cheeks". Charles also produced multiple tracks off of her Tear Tracks album. They additionally announced a European 2022 tour with Anamanaguchi.

Planet 1999 unveiled details of their upcoming EP This Is Our Music in late March 2022, additionally releasing the lead single from the EP, "crush". The EP released in June 2022. Alex also created his own record label, City Links Recordings.

Caro released her second studio album Wild at ♡ in September 2023. It was supported by the singles "From the Heart <3" and "4ever1". It was again released alongside a Bandcamp exclusive bonus demo album titled the lost logic files vol.2.

== Discography ==
=== As a band ===
==== EPs ====
Devotion (2020)

No.	Title	Length
1.	"Spell"	2:15
2.	"Party"	2:50
3.	"Awake"	2:03
4.	"Replay"	2:54
5.	"Haze"	0:59
6.	"Night"	2:03
7.	"Devotion"	2:40
Total length:		15:42

Devotion Deluxe (2021)

No.	Title	Length
8.	"Awake" (Dinamarca Remix)	2:52
9.	"Night" (DJ Lostboi Remix)	4:20
10.	"Party" (A. G. Cook x Baseck Remix)	8:00
Total length:		30:52

This Is Our Music ♫ (2022)

No.	Title	Length
1.	"Z:/"	0:08
2.	"i<3u"	1:36
3.	"dune"	2:29
4.	"crush"	2:28
5.	"gold"	2:33
6.	"()-( : > )-<={|"	0:35
Total length:		9:51

==== Singles ====
- "Spell" (2019)
- "Party" (2020)
- "Replay" (2020)
- "Everyday, Everynight" (2020) (with Anamanaguchi)
- "crush" (2022)
- "dune" (2022)

==== Remixes ====
- Orchin – "dRiVe" (2020)
- Banoffee – "This Is For Me [baby blue]" (2020)

==== Other songs ====
- “May (Radish)” (2021)

=== As solo artists ===
==== ultra caro ====
===== Albums =====
Heartbeats/Heartbreaks (2021)

All tracks written and produced by Caroline Beatrix Maurin. All tracks are stylized in all lowercase, with the exception of "4U".

No.	Title	Length
1.	"Le Grand Bleu"	1:46
2.	"Hide Me Here"	3:23
3.	"Moonrise"	1:33
4.	"Over U"	4:16
5.	"Heart in 2"	4:10
6.	"Wild at Heart"	4:06
7.	"Drop in the Ocean"	4:57
8.	"Sad Song 33"	3:11
9.	"4U"	3:11
10.	"7 Waves"	2:30
11.	"Sad Song 77"	2:50
12.	"Marseille"	3:07
13.	"20K Feet Under"	2:43
14.	"Do You Believe in Forever"	1:29
Total length:		43:02

Wild at ♡ (2023)

All tracks written and produced by Caroline Beatrix Maurin. All tracks are stylized in all lowercase.

No.	Title	Length
1.	"Behind the Clouds"	3:08
2.	"4ever1"	2:38
3.	"Under the Stars"	1:49
4.	"Dreamersofdreams"	3:28
5.	"Running w Wolves"	2:36
6.	"Comet"	3:12
7.	"In2u"	3:21
8.	"Wildatheart Reload"	0:49
9.	"Dive Like a Dove"	2:47
10.	"In2 the Wild"	4:25
11.	"From the Heart <3"	4:14
Total length:		32:31

===== Singles =====
All tracks are stylized in all lowercase.

- "Hide Me Here" (2020)
- "Sad Song 77" (2021)
- "Heart in 2" (2021)
- "Over U" (2021)
- "20K Feet Under" (2021)
- "From the Heart <3" (2023)
- "4ever1" (2023)

===== Guest appearances =====
- GUTTERRING – "cool" from BODYLEPSIS (2022)

===== Remixes =====
- Silly Boy Blue – "The Riddle" (2021)
- A. G. Cook – "Drink Blood" (2021)
- Namasenda – "Steel" (2021) (featuring Hannah Diamond)
- Erika de Casier – "Better Than That" (2021) (co-remix with Hannah Diamond)
- Wave Racer – "Look Up To Yourself" (2022)

== Songwriting and production credits ==
List of songs co-written and/or featuring production involvement from each individual member of Planet 1999
Title	Year	Lead artist	Album	Credit(s)		Member(s)			Notes
Title	Year	Lead artist	Album	Writing	Production	Caro	Alex	Charles	Notes
"What Do You Like In Me"	2019	Nasty Cherry	Non-album single	Yes	Yes	Yes	Yes	Yes	Also mixers
"February 2017"	2019	Charli XCX	Charli	Yes	Co	Yes	Yes	Yes	Featuring Clairo & Yaeji, co-produced with A. G. Cook
"Tapioca Cheeks"	2021	Banoffee	Tear Tracks		Yes	Yes	Yes	Yes	
"Enough"	2021	Banoffee	Tear Tracks		Yes			Yes	Charles is credited as 'Ultralove'
"I Hate It"	2021	Banoffee	Tear Tracks		Yes			Yes	Charles is credited as 'Ultralove'
"Money"	2021	Banoffee	Tear Tracks		Yes			Yes	Charles is credited as 'Ultralove'
"Tears"	2021	Banoffee	Tear Tracks		Yes			Yes	Charles is credited as 'Ultralove'
"Unspoken"	2022	Tessa Dixson	Unspoken EP						Charles mixer
"Creep"	2022	Tessa Dixson	Unspoken EP		Yes	Yes		Yes	Charles also mixer
"Forget U"	2022	Tessa Dixson	Unspoken EP		Yes			Yes	Charles also mixer
"True"	2022	Tessa Dixson	Unspoken EP		Yes			Yes	Charles also mixer
"Bad Thoughts"	2022	Tessa Dixson	Unspoken EP		Yes			Yes	Charles also mixer
"I Gave U Everything"	2022	Tessa Dixson	Unspoken EP						Charles mixer
"u&me"	2022	lagrima	eyes still closed		Yes		Yes		Alex also mixer, credited as 'City Links'
"This Feeling"	2022	lagrima	eyes still closed		Yes		Yes		Alex also mixer, credited as 'City Links'
"Raindrops"	2022	lagrima	eyes still closed		Yes		Yes		Alex also mixer, credited as 'City Links'
"Hide and Seek"	2022	lagrima	eyes still closed		Yes		Yes		Alex also mixer, credited as 'City Links'
"Walking Away"	2022	LST	Closer EP		Yes			Yes	Charles is credited as 'Ultralove', additional production from and mixed by Shlohmo
"Nightdrive"	2022	LST	Closer EP	Caro & Charles	Yes			Yes	Charles is credited as 'Ultralove', additional production from Juice Jackal, Groundislava and Shlohmo, mixed by Shlohmo
"Take Care"	2022	Simili Gum	2He	Alex	Yes		Yes		Alex is credited as 'City Links'
"Helium"	2022	Simili Gum	2He	Alex	Yes		Yes		Alex is credited as 'City Links'
"Nightmares"	2023	lagrima	Non-album single						Alex mixer, credited as 'City Links', also co-artist
"Eclipse"	2023	lagrima	Non-album single						Alex mixer, credited as 'City Links', also co-artist
"Haunt"	2023	daine	Shapeless	Caro	Yes	Yes			
"6 Kiss"	2023	Munix	Left Out		Yes		Additional		Alex also mixer, credited as 'DJ Kit'
"i Two"	2023	Munix	Left Out		Yes		Additional		Alex also mixer, credited as 'DJ Kit'
"Belgium Angel"	2023	Munix	Left Out		Yes		Additional		Alex also mixer, credited as 'DJ Kit'
"Long Gone"	2023	Munix	Left Out		Yes		Additional		Alex also mixer, credited as 'DJ Kit'
"End Fall"	2023	Munix	Left Out		Yes		Additional		Alex also mixer, credited as 'DJ Kit'
"10 Years"	2023	Munix	Left Out		Yes		Additional		Alex also mixer, credited as 'DJ Kit'
