= Pink and Blue (song) =

Single by Hannah Diamond
- Released: 30 October 2013
- Genre: Bubblegum pop; pop
- Length: 2:53
- Label: PC Music
- Songwriters: Hannah Amond; Alexander Guy Cook
- Producer: A. G. Cook

Hannah Diamond singles chronology
| "Pink and Blue" (2013) | "Keri Baby" (2014) |

"Pink and Blue" is the debut single by British singer Hannah Diamond. The song was released on 30 October 2013, available for free digital download and streaming via label PC Music's SoundCloud.

Written by Diamond and A. G. Cook, "Pink and Blue" is a bubblegum pop song drawing on various influences including J-pop, vaporwave, '90s pop, UK garage, trap and dance-pop. The song displays a kitschy aesthetic with pitched-up vocals that some music critics, such as Maurice Marion of Rare Candy, have described as "baby-talk". Lyrically, the song is simple and details unrequited love but subtly addresses the infantilization and sexualization of pop stars used to market music.

"Pink and Blue" received general acclaim from music critics, who praised the song's simplicity and catchiness. "Pink and Blue" was ranked at number five on FACT's 2014 list of "The 100 best tracks of the decade so far".

Diamond has performed the song live on multiple occasions, at venues such as The London Edition Hotel and Empire Garage.

== Background and release ==
"Pink and Blue" was written by Diamond and A. G. Cook. In an interview with Nylon, Diamond revealed she had met Cook during her "first or second year" at a university, and described becoming a musician as natural and random. Diamond also stated that the "how about you" lyric reminded her of how she would go on MSN after going to school growing up, and how the people on MSN said things such as "'how are you' and 'wuu2.'". "Pink and Blue" was released on 30 October 2013 to label PC Music's SoundCloud, where it was available to be streamed and downloaded for free. On 8 May 2014, the song had reached 100,000 plays on SoundCloud, becoming the first song released on the PC Music label to do so.

== Composition ==
"Pink and Blue" is a bubblegum pop and pop song that is two minutes and fifty-three seconds long. In an article about Diamond and "post-ringtone music", FACT believed "Pink and Blue" to be "[f]olding in J-Pop twinkle, the unease of vaporwave and the sonic palette of ‘90s pop". Aly Barchi of Complete Music Update described the genre of the song as "[a] pastel-shaded take on UK garage, trappy beats and bon-bon dance-pop", and the lyrics as "‘girl-boy’ lyrics so super-sticky-kitsch". Barchi has also described the song as a "universal story of ‘a love unrequited', told in the most basic ABC rhymes at top pitch over a ‘Shanks & Bigfoot go to Disneyland’-style beat". Ryan Bassil of Noisey compared the song to a lullaby, commenting that the song is "like a lullaby – but made for teenagers that send every pink emoji on the iPhone keyboard". Brendan Klinkenberg of Pigeons and Planes noted the song to be an example of the uncanny valley, and called the song's lyrics "simple and earnest". Klinkenberg also noted that Diamond had slightly pitched-up vocals in the song. Maurice Marion of Rare Candy has described "Pink and Blue" as subtly addressing the cultural issue of sexualizing and infantilizing pop stars to market music, citing perceived sexual lyrics such as "hey, why don’t you hit me up?", Diamond’s "baby-talk vocals", and the song's "sugary production" as pushing the aforementioned issue to a "self-conscious extreme".

== Critical reception ==
"Pink and Blue" has received general acclaim from music critics. George Awwad of Portals called the song a "great introduction to PC Music’s catalog". Awwad also praised the track's vocals and production together, and commended the line "Hey why don’t you hit me up". Chris Taylor of The 405 praised the song's catchiness. Aly Barchi of Complete Music Update said, of the song, "‘Pink And Blue’ is at once ‘just a dumb pop song’ and also a highly smart bit of manufacturing. And so, so good… infuriatingly good." Jamie Milton of DIY honored the song as "THE BIG NEU THING", and called the song "one of the most insanely addictive tracks of the year [2013]". Without giving a personal opinion on "Pink and Blue", Brendan Klinkenberg of Pigeons and Planes noted that Diamond's "childlike" vocal delivery, persona, and its focus on falling in love, has caused the general response to the song to be divided.

FACT placed "Pink and Blue" on a 2014 list titled "PC Music: the 10 best tracks so far from 2014’s most divisive record label". FACT also ranked the song at number five for their 2014 list of "The 100 best tracks of the decade so far", commenting that the song "captures what’s great about the label [PC Music]". FACT further praised the song, calling it an "addictive, ambivalent confection". Ally Barchi of Complete Music Update has credited "Pink and Blue" with introducing PC Music to a broader audience. In a 2016 article about PC Music, Kyle MacNeill of Thump deemed "Pink and Blue" "arguably the strongest track to emerge from the collective".

== Live performances ==
"Pink and Blue" was performed live for the first time on 4 April 2014 at The London Edition Hotel, for Diamond's debut live performance. Tamara Roper of The 405 called the performance of the song "a bit dry", but noticed that the audience sang along to the Diamond's presentation, and that Diamond elicited a positive audience reaction. The song was included on Diamond's setlist at the Empire Garage in Austin, Texas, on 19 March 2015. Stephen Carlick of Exclaim! deemed the performance, as a whole, a 7/10, noticing Diamond "sounded more like she was singing" while she was performing "Pink and Blue", in opposed to lip-syncing.

== Release history ==
Release history and formats for "Pink and Blue"
| Country | Date | Format | Label |
|---|---|---|---|
| Various | 30 October 2013 | Digital download; streaming | PC Music |
