= PC Music Volume 1 =

Compilation album by various artists
- Released: 2 May 2015
- Recorded: 2013–2015
- Genre: Hyperpop; Dance-pop; bubblegum pop; Eurodance; europop
- Length: 29:46
- Label: PC Music

PC Music chronology
PC Music Volume 1 (2015)	PC Music Volume 2 (2016)

PC Music Volume 1 is the first compilation album by British record label PC Music, released on 2 May 2015 as a paid download. The album consists of remastered versions of the label's earlier work.

The compilation was met with polarising, yet mostly positive reviews from critics upon its release. Some reviewers praised its innovative sound while others found the overall concept of the label to be wearing thin and the music to be shallow.

== Background and composition ==
Because the label releases most of its work for free, "Every Night" by Hannah Diamond had been the only song available for purchase. PC Music Volume 1 includes one new track—"USA" by GFOTY, which had previously appeared on her Secret Mix.

The label's musical acts function more as avatars than as themselves. The songs carry themes of escaping physical life, with an artificial quality that intensifies feelings of longing. PC Music often uses the motif of eternity, and several of the songs use together/forever rhymes. The album's digital take on dance-pop music favours retrofuturistic Eurodance and high-pitched, cutesy female vocals. Its often minimalist production produces frenetic, distorted mixes.

== Critical reception ==
Professional ratings
Aggregate scores
Source	Rating
Metacritic	69/100
Review scores
Source	Rating
Consequence of Sound	B
Crack Magazine	10/20
NME	8/10
Now	NNNN
Pitchfork	7.3/10
Resident Advisor	3.8/5
Rolling Stone	2.5/5 stars
Spin	8/10
Sputnikmusic	3.5/5

PC Music Volume 1 received divided reviews from critics. According to the review aggregator website Metacritic, it received "generally favorable reviews", with a score of 69 out of 100 based on nine reviews. Consequence of Sound wrote that the album "leaves space for agnosticism about whether it's all a joke or a deathly serious artistic maneuver". Spin magazine regretted the omission of some of the label's more satirical work, but it continued that "at almost 30 minutes exactly, PC Music Volume 1 quits while it's ahead". Pitchfork described the album as a "rapturous, nightmarish cartoon corpus" that showcases "a meaningful spectrum of approaches within the PC Music ethos".

In more mixed reviews, Rolling Stone's Jon Dolan said that with the exception of A. G. Cook's "Beautiful", "the songs are only as good as the concept, which wears thin fast". A review published in The Wire described the album as "[resembling] the soundtrack to a posh private schooler's teen sleepover—glossy, giddy, sparkly and shallow". Xavier Boucherat described how he scored the album on a 20-point scale in his review for the magazine Crack: "2 points for Danny 'dick in the pants' Harle for having arguably the funniest moniker out, 2 for those 'Red Bull own PC Music' rumours that you yourselves probably started, and 6 for GFOTY who weirdly reminds me of my mum".

PC Music Volume 1 was ranked the 36th best album of 2015 by Time Out London, the 7th best experimental album by PopMatters, and made Spin and Flavorwire's lists of the best albums of the first half of 2015.

== Track listing ==
No.	Title	Artist	Length
1.	"Every Night"	Hannah Diamond	3:33
2.	"Beautiful"	A. G. Cook	3:49
3.	"USA"	GFOTY	2:23
4.	"In My Dreams"	Danny L Harle	3:28
5.	"Attachment"	Hannah Diamond	4:19
6.	"Wannabe"	Lipgloss Twins	2:23
7.	"Bronze"	Thy Slaughter	2:15
8.	"Keri Baby" (featuring Hannah Diamond)	A. G. Cook	2:10
9.	"Don't Wanna/Let's Do It"	GFOTY	1:52
10.	"Laplander"	easyFun	3:34
