= PC Music =

UK-based record label and art collective

- Founded: June 25, 2013
- Founder: A. G. Cook
- Genre: Pop; electronic; hyperpop; bubblegum bass
- Country of origin: United Kingdom
- Location: London
- Official website: pcmusic.info

PC Music is a record label and art collective based in London and run by producer A. G. Cook. It was founded in 2013, uploading its first releases to SoundCloud that year. Artists on its roster have included Hannah Diamond, GFOTY, Danny L Harle, Finn Keane (previously known as Easyfun), Namasenda, and Planet 1999. The label's releases have been showcased on the compilations PC Music Volume 1 (2015), Volume 2 (2016), and Volume 3 (2022). As of 2024, the label exclusively does archival projects and special reissues and is no longer actively releasing new music.

The label is known for its surreal or exaggerated take on pop music tropes from the 1990s and 2000s, often featuring pitch-shifted, feminine vocals and bright, synthetic textures. PC Music has been characterized as embracing the aesthetics of advertising, consumerism, and corporate branding. Its artists often present devised personas inspired by cyberculture. The label has elicited both praise and criticism from journalists, and has been called "polarizing".

== History ==
A. G. Cook, an English musician, had previously worked on Gamsonite, a "pseudo-label" and blog collecting his early collaborations, among other projects while studying music at Goldsmiths, University of London. He founded PC Music in June 2013, as a way of embracing an A&R role. Within a year the label had published 40 songs on SoundCloud as of September 2014, some of its songs had accumulated over 100,000 listens. It had not released a physical single, and its first paid download did not come until the November 2014 release of Hannah Diamond's "Every Night". QT's "Hey QT" single was also released in 2014, on XL Recordings, with production from Cook and PC Music-affiliate Sophie.

In March 2014, the label made their live debut in the United States when Cook, Sophie and QT performed at Hype Machine's Hype Hotel during South by Southwest. The following year, in March 2015, several members of the collective appeared at a label showcase at South by Southwest. Cook described it as a "rebirth moment" for the group, moving toward functioning as a real record label. Shortly after, they released their first official compilation album, titled PC Music Volume 1. On 8 May 2015, PC Music artists performed at BRIC House in Brooklyn, New York as part of the Red Bull Music Academy Festival, to premiere Pop Cube, "a multimedia reality network".

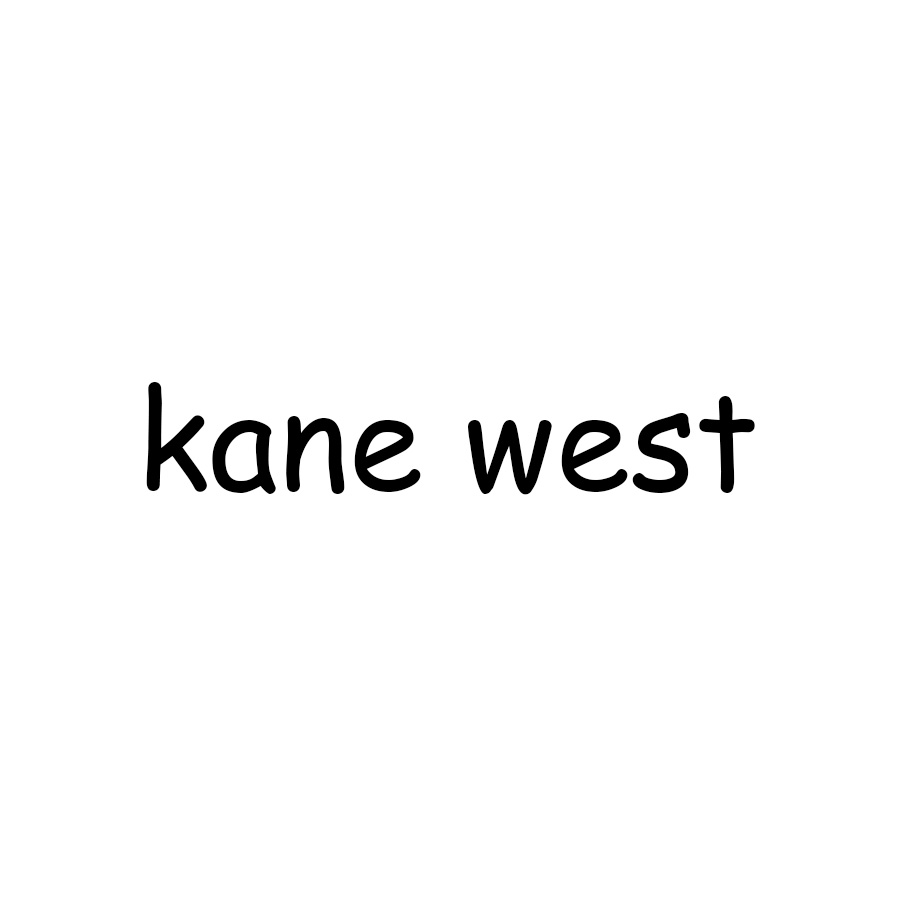
Promotional artwork for Kane West (Gus Lobban)'s Western Beats EP. The use of Comic Sans alludes to the typography of early web sites.

On 21 October 2015, the label announced on Facebook a partnership with major record label Columbia Records. The first release through this partnership was an EP from Danny L Harle. In December 2015 PC Music released the single "Only You", a collaboration between A. G. Cook and the Chinese pop star Chris Lee, with a music video directed by Kinga Burza.

On 18 November 2016, PC Music released PC Music Volume 2, a compilation featuring most of the label's roster. A review in The Guardian praised it for being "more beautiful and progressive than ever before" and proof that "Cook and his gang are the cleverest, most thoughtful people in British pop".

On 16 February 2018, PC Music released a limited dual-vinyl compilation of both PC Music Volumes 1 and 2 and in December 2018, PC Music announced new vinyl and CD reissues of PC Music Volumes 1 and 2, as well as the first physical release of the label's Month of Mayhem compilation.

On 25 June 2023, the label's 10th anniversary, PC Music announced that 2023 would be the label's final year of new releases, and from 2024, the label would be dedicated to archival projects and special reissues. Coinciding this announcement was the release of a mixtape featuring the work of many PC Music artists.

PC Music's final new release was Thy Slaughter's debut album Soft Rock, released December 1, 2023. The album featured appearances from Alaska Reid, Caroline Polachek, Ellie Rowsell, and Charli XCX, as well as additional songwriting from Alma, Patrik Berger, Noonie Bao, and Sophie.

== Sound and influences ==
The label has released music with a consistent sound that Clive Martin, writing for Vice, described as a "playful composite of disregarded sounds and genres". Lanre Bakare, writing for The Guardian, identified the music's elements as "the huge synth blasts favoured by Eurodance chart-botherers such as Cascada, grime's sub-bass, and happy hardcore's high-pitched vocal range". The styles and influences of music incorporated include bubblegum dance, Balearic trance, wonky and electro house. Cook cites Korean & Japanese pop music and gyaru culture, as well as the production work of Max Martin and Jimmy Jam and Terry Lewis. His production involves layering discordant sounds on top of each other to produce chaotic mixes, similar to the techniques used in black MIDI music. Abrupt shifts in timbre and rhythm are used to create multiple perspectives of a personality. Cook also indirectly cites American musician Conlon Nancarrow as a source of inspiration in the PC Music Pop Cube Trailer 1.

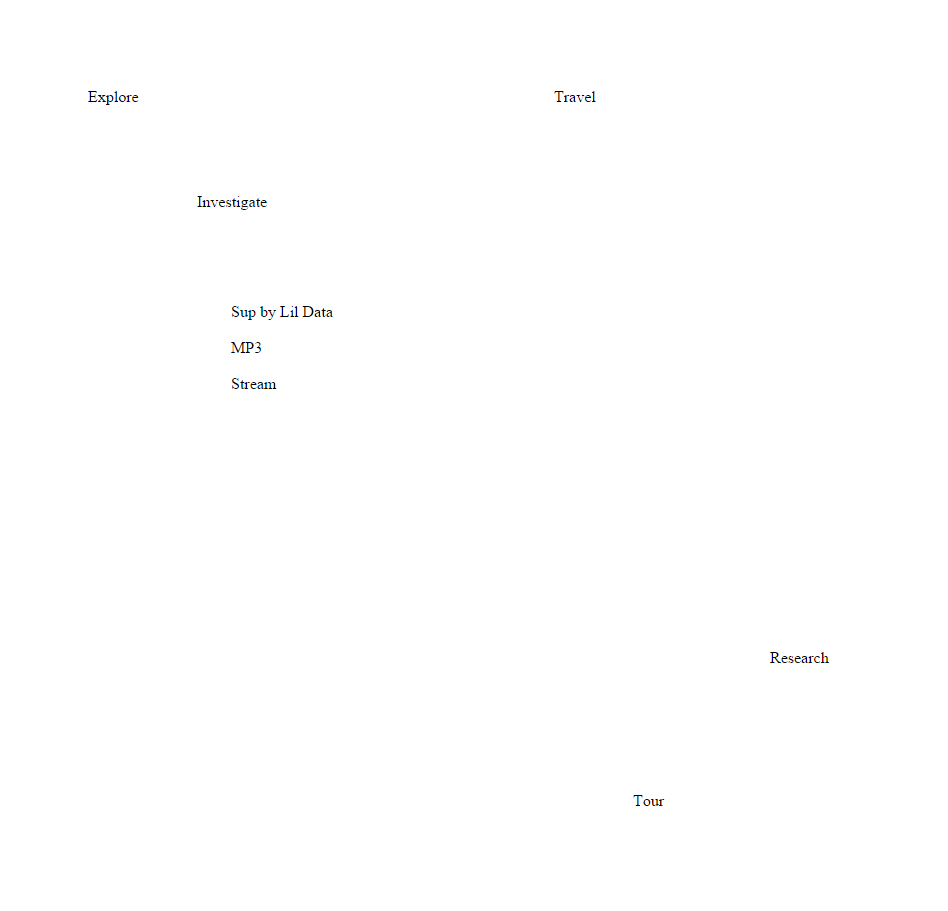
A promotional website for Sup by Lil Data, which incorporates influences of net art.

PC Music's songwriting often deals with consumerism as a theme. In their take on haul videos, Lipgloss Twins include references to fashion and makeup brands. Vocals on the label's mix for DIS Magazine reflect various forms of marketing: producer ID tags, film trailers, and product placement for a sponsor. The label brings in inexperienced singers to record its songs. It thoroughly processes the vocals, shifting the pitch upward or chopping it to use as a rhythmic element. These distortions create a post-ironic representation of consumerism, money, and sex.

PC Music's aesthetic combines elements of cuteness, camp, and kawaii, though often, as music critic Maurice Marion points out for Rare Candy, with a sinister, Lynchian undertone achieved by dissonant inversions and caustic harmonization. Critics likened the label to Ryan Trecartin in its irregular pacing and valley girl slang. The label had also been described as "post-internet". In a piece for Vice, Ryan Bassil suggested that PC Music's style allows for a more candid expression of emotions.

PC Music has been described as a less "macho" take on the "house revival", bringing "playfulness and femininity" to dance music subculture. The availability of music software has allowed for the spread of high-production dance music by independent musicians, particularly on SoundCloud. PC Music often exaggerates the homogenised, high-fidelity aesthetics of these songs. Vogue deputy editor Alex Frank commented that the overt manipulation of cultural references showcased a cynical sense of humour, creating an insular approach to making dance music during a period of house revival.

In the late 2010s, the term "hyperpop" began to be used as a microgenre referring to music associated with the PC Music label and the artists it influenced.

=== Philosophy ===
The label functions as a collective in which acts frequently collaborate with each other. Many of the acts are aliases, obscuring the identities and number of artists on the label. Early on, the label kept tight control over its branding and limited its interaction with journalists, and as its profile grew, Cook declined to engage with press, described as a sort of Berry Gordy figure within the group. Vice magazine said that PC Music's acts are best understood not as living people but as "meticulously planned and considered long-running art pieces...living installations who put out music." Cook mentioned a preference for "recording people who don't normally make music and treating them as if they're a major label artist." Rather than engaging in extended promotional campaigns, the label continually announces new acts. Each develops a persona that is conveyed through Internet slang and cartoon imagery.

== Reception ==
As PC Music became more prominent in 2014, the reaction to it was often described as "divisive". Joe Moynihan, writing in Fact, remarked that "PC Music have, in just over a year, released some of the most compelling pop music in recent memory." Some critics have found its high-tempo trance sound artless or aggravating.

PC Music received accolades in several 2014 year-end summaries. Dazed included A. G. Cook at number 12 in their "Dazed 100"; Fact named PC Music the best label of 2014; The Huffington Post included PC Music at number 3 in their "Underrated Albums - 2014"; Resident Advisor included PC Music at number 4 in their "Top Labels of The Year" in 2014; and Tiny Mix Tapes included it in their "Favorite 15 Labels of 2014". Spin magazine named PC Music its "Trend of the Year" for 2014. In 2021, The Forty-Five named several PC Music artists – including A.G. Cook, umru, and Hannah Diamond – in their list of the best hyperpop songs of all time.

== Live shows ==
PC Music have produced a number of label focused showcases since their inception. After a brief showcase at SXSW in 2015, on 8 May 2015, PC Music launched a "multimedia reality network" called 'Pop Cube'. An event in conjunction with the network was created and became part of the Red Bull Music Academy Festival in New York, which quickly sold out. In May 2016, PC Music presented 'Pop Cosmos' at the Scala in London, featuring Danny L Harle, Hannah Diamond, GFOTY, A. G. Cook, Felicita, Easyfun and Spinee. In July 2016 PC Music held a new one-off event called 'Pop City' at Create in Los Angeles. As well as scheduled performances from PC Music performers, the show featured guests, including Carly Rae Jepsen, Charli XCX, and QT. On the 405 webzine, PC Music's live shows have been described as being surrounded by a care-less authentic aura and have been recognised for their "forward-thinking fearlessness to push pop music into new and daring areas".

== Artists ==
Artists previously signed to the label

- A. G. Cook
- Astra King
- caro♡
- Danny L Harle
- EasyFun
- felicita
- Finn Diesel
- GFOTY
- GRRL
- Hannah Diamond
- Hyd
- Holly Waxwing
- Lil Data
- Namasenda
- Ö
- Planet 1999
- Spinee
- Tommy Cash
- umru

Artists with only one solo release on the label

- Chris Lee
- Maxo
- Princess Bambi
- Tielsie

Group projects and alternative aliases on the label

- AFK (Ö & A. G. Cook)
- Bopples (A. G. Cook & Kai Whiston)
- Danny Sunshine (Danny L Harle)
- DJ Lifeline (A. G. Cook)
- DJ Warlord (A. G. Cook)
- Dux Content (A. G. Cook & Danny L Harle)
- EasyFX (A. G. Cook & EasyFun)
- Guys Next Door (A. G. Cook & Oneohtrix Point Never)
- Life Sim (speculated to be A. G. Cook)
- Lipgloss Twins (A. G. Cook & Felicita)
- MC Boing (Danny L Harle & Lil Data)
- Nu New Edition (A. G. Cook)
- Pobbles (A. G. Cook)
- Thy Slaughter (A. G. Cook & EasyFun)
- U.R.S.U.L.A. (speculated to be A. G. Cook & Spinee)

Vocalists and other featured artists on the label

- 645AR
- AJ Simons
- Alaska Reid
- Banoffee
- Carly Rae Jepsen
- Caroline Polachek
- Cecile Believe
- Charli XCX
- Chloe Sachikonye
- Clairo
- Denzel Himself
- Ellen Roberts
- Ellie Rowsell
- Emily Verlander
- Eyelar
- emotegi
- Fraxiom
- Goth Jafar
- Harriet Pittard
- Hazel Yule
- Iiris
- Joey LaBeija
- Kero Kero Bonito
- La Zowi
- Laura Les
- Lewis Grant
- Matt Copson
- Merlin Nova
- Mowalola
- Noonie Bao
- OhEm
- Oklou
- Petal Supply
- Phoebe Ryan
- Raffy
- Ravenna Golden
- Rebecca Black
- Sarah Bonito
- Sophie Cates
- Sounds Like a U Problem
- Tony Velour
- YoungQueenz

Artists with at least one remixed release by an artist on the label

- 100 gecs
- Aphex Twin
- Banoffee
- Baauer
- Bladee
- Bleachers
- Caroline Polachek
- Casey MQ
- Charli xcx
- Christine and the Queens
- DJ DJ Booth
- Dreamtrak
- Eartheater
- Ed Sheeran
- Erika de Casier
- Hikaru Utada
- How to Dress Well
- Janet Jackson
- K.I.D
- Kacy Hill
- Kai Whiston
- Kero Kero Bonito
- Lady Gaga
- Lil Aaron
- Magdalena Bay
- Max Tundra
- MNEK
- Oklou
- Oneohtrix Point Never
- Orchin
- Perfume Genius
- Phoenix
- Rostam
- Sekai no Owari
- Silly Boy Blue
- Slayyyter
- Smashing Pumpkins
- Spector
- Tinashe
- Wave Racer
- Whethan
- Yelle

Timeline

== Discography ==
=== Compilation albums ===
List of compilation albums, with other relevant details
Title	Album details
PC Music Volume 1	Released: 2 May 2015; Format: Digital download, streaming; Featured artists: A. G. Cook, Hannah Diamond, GFOTY, Danny L Harle, Lipgloss Twins, Thy Slaughter, Easyfun
PC Music Volume 2	Released: 18 November 2016; Format: Digital download, streaming; Featured artists: Hannah Diamond, Danny L Harle, A. G. Cook, Easyfun, GFOTY, Felicita, Li Yuchun
PC Music Volumes 1 & 2	Released: 18 February 2018; Format: LP, CD; Featured artists: A. G. Cook, Hannah Diamond, GFOTY, Danny L Harle, Easyfun, Felicita, Li Yuchun
Month of Mayhem	Released: 28 July 2018; Format: Digital download, streaming, LP; Featured artists: Danny L Harle, A. G. Cook, Morrie, GFOTY, Spinee, Easyfun, Lil Data, Pobbles, Daniel Lopatin, tonight.burns.red
Appleville (Golden Ticket)	Released: 22 September 2020; Format: Digital download, streaming; Featured artists: A. G. Cook, Caroline Polachek, Hannah Diamond, Dorian Electra, Count Baldor, Astra King, Kero Kero Bonito, Planet 1999, Cali Cartier, Baseck, Quiet Local, Ö, Apple Guild Choir, The Grateful Zedd, Mintoaur Jr., Me & U2, Harmain, Behind Philip Glass, Iggy Hyperpop, AC/PC, Soundloud, Vroom Halen, Appleback, Thy Moser, Half-Björc
Pop Crypt (Skeleton Key)	Released: 1 November 2020; Format: Digital download, streaming; Featured artists: Alice Longyu Gao, A. G. Cook, Cecile Believe, caro♡, Umru, Fraxiom, Shigecki, Himera, Riley the Musician, William Crooks, Standard Operating Procedure, DJ Fuck, Qualiatik
Pop Caroler's Songbook	Released: 19 December 2020; Format: Digital download, streaming; Featured artists: Caroline Polachek, Hannah Diamond, A. G. Cook, Planet 1999, Alaska Reid, Holly Waxwing, Astra King, Kane West, Lewis Grant, Golin, Samuelspaniel, Umru, Silver Sphere, Ericdoa, Fraxiom, Jonny Gorgeous, Six Impala, Himera, Petal Supply, Gupi, Banoffee, Kelora, Cali Cartier, Baby Izo, Glitch Gum, Alice Longyu Gao, Folie, Caroline Lucent, Kai Whiston
PC Music Volume 3	Released: 13 May 2022; Format: Digital download, streaming, LP, CD; Featured artists: Easyfun, Iiris, Hannah Diamond, Tommy Cash, felicita, Caroline Polachek, Danny L Harle, Clairo, Umru, Laura Les, Lil Data, Planet 1999, Namasenda, A. G. Cook, Charli XCX, Oklou, caro♡, Hyd, 645AR, Ö, Kero Kero Bonito
Away From Keyboard [file not found]	Released: 11 December 2022; Format: Digital download, streaming; Featured artists: Ö, Regina Demina, caro♡, Lecx Stacy, Alex Somers, Baseck, AO, Bopples, Kai Whiston, A. G. Cook

=== Extended plays ===
List of compilation extended plays, with other relevant details
Title	Album details
Pop Carol (Free Present with RSVP)	Released: 9 December 2020; Format: Digital download, streaming; Featured artists: A. G. Cook, Kai Whiston
