= Clearing (Hyd album) =

Studio album by Hyd
- Released: November 11, 2022
- Length: 39:34
- Label: PC Music
- Producer: Sophie; A. G. Cook; Easyfun; Alex Somers; Jónsi; Ö; Caroline Polachek

Hyd chronology
Hyd (2021)	Clearing (2022)	Hold Onto Me Infinity (2026)

Singles from Clearing
- 1. "Afar" Released: July 14, 2022; 2. "So Clear" Released: September 8, 2022; 3. "Breaking Ground" Released: September 29, 2022; 4. "Fallen Angel" Released: October 20, 2022

Clearing is the debut studio album by American multidisciplinary artist Hayden Dunham, under their musical alias Hyd. It was released on November 11, 2022, via PC Music. The album was many years in the making, with songs being premiered live as far back as 2018. Material from the album was recorded on the Spanish island Lanzarote, which Hyd has stated served as strong inspiration for the album's natural and environmental themes and soundscapes. The album features contributions from the late Sophie, as well as A. G. Cook, Jónsi, and Caroline Polachek, among others.

It was supported by the singles "Afar", "So Clear", "Breaking Ground" and "Fallen Angel".

== Background and release ==
Dunham created the QT project alongside friends in 2014: PC Music founder A. G. Cook and Sophie. The project included the single "Hey QT", and DrinkQT, a Red Bull-esque energy drink with a design by Kim Laughton. The music and drink were intended to be two manifestations of the same product. The song has widely celebrated since its release, and is often credited for what catapulted PC Music's success.

Hyd first emerged in 2020, on Cook's 7G and Apple albums. "Airhead", from the latter album, interpolates melodies from "Breaking Ground". In 2021, Hyd released "No Shadow" as the lead single to their self-titled EP, which came out later that year in November. In an interview with Caroline Polachek in December 2021, Hyd confirmed they were working on music with Alex Somers and Hannah Diamond.

The lead single "Afar" was released in July 2022, featuring production from Polachek. Hyd performed at Pitchfork Music Festival the same month, where she shared some of the album's songs. The title track "So Clear" released later in September, alongside the album and a tour announcement. "Breaking Ground" and "Fallen Angel" were also later released as singles.

== Track listing ==
Clearing track listing
No.	Title	Writer(s)	Producer(s)	Length
1.	"Trust"	Hayden Dunham; Sophie Xeon; A. G. Cook; Caroline Polachek	Sophie; Cook	2:52
2.	"Fallen Angel"	Dunham; Xeon; Cook; Danny L Harle	Sophie; Cook	4:25
3.	"So Clear"	Dunham; Xeon; Finn Keane	Easyfun; Sophie; Cook^{[a]}	3:00
4.	"Oil + Honey"	Dunham; Cook; Alex Somers; Jónsi	Cook; Somers; Jónsi	4:40
5.	"Breaking Ground"	Dunham; Cook; Keane	Easyfun; Cook^{[a]}	3:19
6.	"Chlorophyll"	Dunham; Keane	Thy Slaughter^{[b]}	2:49
7.	"Glass"	Dunham; Cook; Nicolas Petitfrère	Ö; Cook^{[a]}	3:20
8.	"The Real You"	Dunham; Xeon; Cook; John Roberts	Sophie; Cook	3:53
9.	"Bright Light"	Dunham; Cook	Cook	3:38
10.	"Only Living for You"	Dunham; Xeon; Cook	Sophie; Cook	4:01
11.	"Afar"	Dunham; Polachek	Polachek	3:35
Total length:				39:34

Notes

- ^{^[a]} signifies an additional producer
- ^{^[b]} Thy Slaughter is a duo formed by Easyfun and A. G. Cook.
- "Oil + Honey" features backing vocals performed by Jónsi and the Capital Children's Choir.
- "Glass" features backing vocals performed by Caroline Polachek and Ö.

== Release history ==
Release history and formats for Clearing
Region	Date	Format	Label	Ref.
Various	November 11, 2022	Digital download; streaming; CD	PC Music	
Various	March 11, 2023	LP	PC Music	
