= Britpop (A. G. Cook album) =

Studio album by A. G. Cook
- Released: 10 May 2024
- Genre: Electronic
- Length: 99:43
- Label: New Alias
- Producer: A. G. Cook

A. G. Cook chronology
Apple vs. 7G (2021)	Britpop (2024)	The Moment (The Score) (2026)

Singles from Britpop
- 1. "Silver Thread Golden Needle" Released: 1 January 2024; 2. "Britpop" Released: 23 February 2024; 3. "Soulbreaker" Released: 17 April 2024

Britpop is the third studio album by English music producer A. G. Cook. The album was released on 10 May 2024 via New Alias. It arrived five months after the announcement that Cook's PC Music label would cease to release any new material. The album is split into separate discs, similar to his debut album 7G (2020), with the three discs on Britpop representing the past, present and future of Cook's artistry. The album was supported by the singles "Silver Thread Golden Needle", the title track, and "Soulbreaker".

Britpop was universally acclaimed by critics upon its release, who praised the album for its innovative-sounding production with hyperpop elements, creating a genre-bending and nostalgic listening experience. Many critics consider the album A. G. Cook's best solo body of work yet.

== Background and release ==
Some of the material from Britpop was teased in mixes before the album's release, such as tracks "Soulbreaker" and "Equine".

The early stages of the album's design began in 2020, when Cook lived in Montana with his partner Alaska Reid during COVID-19 lockdowns. Cook said, "I was the only British person there and having that sense of being a bit of an alien... So a way of digging into what an A. G. Cook album could be was to use this as a strange launching pad, finding this thing that's slightly too loaded."

Cook released "Silver Thread Golden Needle" 1 January 2024. The song was previously premiered in 2021 at Eckhaus Latta's Spring 2022 New York showcase.

Britpop was announced alongside the release of the title track on 23 February. In a press release, Cook explained the album's ethos:

"I've joked in the past about this sort of British invasion that goes back to Beatlemania. It's always been interesting to me that so many PC Music artists, even if they're still based in the UK, have really resonated with different US subcultures and even the mainstream pop songwriters out here. So many aspects of the American frontier are referencing some imported mythic idea of British history, and that's just the beginning. I've also really committed to some of those associations myself, growing up with a Beatles haircut and calling my album Apple. I've always enjoyed finding those funny connections that expose how confusing and multifaceted culture is across all these lanes — and exploiting those coincidences."

Cook announced the Britpop Roadshow: a series of mini residencies in Los Angeles, London and New York City across April and May to promote the album. He additionally teased the track list on TikTok in late March. Cook also launched the sites Witchfork, Wandcamp, and Wheatport as an alternate reality project that parodied Pitchfork, Bandcamp, and Beatport. These sites were made inactive after a few weeks of regular posts.

"Soulbreaker" was released as a single on 17 April, alongside an animated music video directed by Gustaf Holtenäs. Cook also began a 3-week residency at NTS Radio on 22 April to explore the album's distinct past, present, and future sections.

== Music and lyrics ==
Disc one focuses on the 'Past' of Cook's "playful electronic" sound. It has been described as the "closest to what [people know to be] PC Music."

The 'Present' disc features mostly "delicate, close-mic vocal" guitar-oriented tracks. A lot of the songs are "one-track, or more raw". The final track on this disc "Without" is an ode to the late producer Sophie, one of Cook's closest friends and collaborators. The track is built around a "melodic nod" to her breakout single "Bipp".

The final 'Future' disc is self-described by Cook as "the most unknown and ambiguous".

== Critical reception ==
Professional ratings
Aggregate scores
Source	Rating
AnyDecentMusic?	8.1/10
Metacritic	87/100
Review scores
Source	Rating
Clash	8/10
DIY	5/5 stars
Dork	5/5 stars
The Line of Best Fit	8/10
NME	5/5 stars
Paste	7.9/10
Pitchfork	7.8/10
The Skinny	4/5 stars
Slant Magazine	4/5 stars

Chal Ravens of Pitchfork described Britpop as "a rangy triple album full of shiny synths, inside jokes, and gently sentimental vocal pop" and felt that it "opens a practical portal between Cook's old universe—hard, bright, aggressively contemporary—and a seductively oppositional dimension of folklore, fantasy, fuzz rock, and magic".

=== Year-end lists ===
Select year-end rankings for Britpop
Publication/critic	Accolade	Rank	Ref.
BBC Radio 6 Music	26 Albums of the Year 2024	-	
Exclaim!	50 Best Albums of 2024	42	
Time Out	The Best Albums of 2024	8	

== Track listing ==
All tracks written by Alexander Guy Cook, except where noted. Credits adapted from TIDAL.

Disc one: Past
No.	Title	Length
1.	"Silver Thread Golden Needle"	9:56
2.	"Britpop" (Cook, Charlotte Aitchison)	3:22
3.	"You Know Me"	4:07
4.	"Prismatic"	3:49
5.	"Crescent Sun"	4:05
6.	"Heartache"	4:35
7.	"Television"	3:27
8.	"Luddite Factory Operator"	6:38
Total length:		39:59

Disc two: Present
No.	Title	Length
1.	"Serenade"	2:58
2.	"Nice to Meet You"	3:04
3.	"The Weave"	4:07
4.	"Green Man"	2:57
5.	"Crone"	2:59
6.	"Greatly"	3:04
7.	"Bewitched"	3:19
8.	"Without"	2:40
Total length:		25:08

Disc three: Future
No.	Title	Length
1.	"Soulbreaker"	3:54
2.	"Lucifer" (Cook, Aitchison, Noonie Bao, Addison Rae, Brett Leland McLaughlin)	3:19
3.	"Emerald"	4:44
4.	"Butterfly Craft" (Cook, Oliver Leith)	1:59
5.	"Equine"	3:41
6.	"WWW"	5:17
7.	"Pink Mask"	4:47
8.	"Out of Time"	6:55
Total length:		34:36

Notes

- "Silver Thread Golden Needle" contains samples from "Show Me What" from Cook's 7G album.
- "Britpop" interpolates "Lipgloss" by Charli XCX.
- "Without" interpolates "BIPP" by Sophie.
- "Soulbreaker" interpolates "6 Miniatures: I. Lord Jesus Christ is Born", Leoš Janáček's arrangement of the traditional Czech Christian hymn Narodil se Kristus Pán.

== Personnel ==
- A. G. Cook – vocals, performer, producer, mixing engineer
- Charli XCX – vocals ("Britpop", "Television", "Lucifer")
- Cecile Believe – vocals ("Prismatic")
- Alaska Reid – vocals ("Luddite Factory Operator", "Pink Mask")
- Ellen Roberts – vocals ("Bewitched")
- Addison Rae – vocals ("Lucifer")
- Caroline Polachek – vocals ("Equine")
- Alex Evans – mixing engineer
- Geoff Swan – mixing engineer
- Robin Schmidt – mastering engineer
