= Superstar (A. G. Cook song) =

Single by A. G. Cook
- Released: 13 July 2016
- Recorded: 2014–2016
- Length: 4:51
- Label: PC Music
- Songwriter: Alexander Guy Cook
- Producer: A. G. Cook

A. G. Cook singles chronology
"Drop FM" (2016)	"Superstar" (2016)	"Money on a Gold Plate" / "Cos I Love U" (2016)

Official lyric video
- "Superstar" on YouTube

"Superstar" is a song by the English music producer A. G. Cook. It was released on 13 July 2016 through PC Music. It later appeared on PC Music's compilation album PC Music Volume 2 (2016). A live Secret Sky version appeared on Cook's 2020 debut studio album, 7G.

== Background ==
A. G. Cook had begun work on "Superstar" in 2014 and initially pitched it to DJ Zedd, but it was rejected. The single art was done by Hannah Diamond. Cook said that, compared to his earlier single "Beautiful", "Superstar" is "more dramatic and slightly more composed, but it also follows an unusual song structure". He said the song "[plays] with the balance of songwriting and production and sort of destabilising that balance or not taking the art form too seriously".

Musician Flume considered it one of his favorite tracks of 2016. In an interview with Mixmag, Cook said "Superstar" helped him in being confident with his own vocals and assuming a singer-songwriter role with his music. In 2020, Cook released the song "Beautiful Superstar" as a single from his second studio album Apple; the song title is a reference to "Superstar" and his 2014 single "Beautiful".

== Track listing ==
Digital single

- "Superstar" – 4:51

== Personnel ==
- A. G. Cook – production, songwriting
- Hannah Diamond – single art
