= Take the Sadness Out of Saturday Night =

- Digital and streaming cover

Studio album by Bleachers
- Released: July 30, 2021
- Recorded: 2019–2021
- Genres: Synth-pop; indie pop; slowcore
- Length: 33:47
- Label: RCA
- Producers: Jack Antonoff; Patrik Berger; Annie Clark

Bleachers chronology
Terrible Thrills, Vol. 3 (2019)	Take the Sadness Out of Saturday Night (2021)	Bleachers (2024)

Singles from Take the Sadness Out of Saturday Night
- 1. "45" Released: November 16, 2020; 2. "Chinatown" Released: November 16, 2020; 3. "Stop Making This Hurt" Released: May 18, 2021; 4. "How Dare You Want More" Released: June 9, 2021

Take the Sadness Out of Saturday Night is the third studio album by American indie pop act Bleachers, released on July 30, 2021, by RCA Records. Jack Antonoff began working on the album in 2019 and finished it during the COVID-19 pandemic. It received generally positive reviews from critics, and peaked at number 27 on the US Billboard 200.

== Background ==
Jack Antonoff began recording the album in late 2019, while the band embarked on a three-day "mini-tour" called the "I Love Making This Album but I'm Also Losing My Mind in Here & Need to Come Out and Play" Tour. On January 6, 2020, Antonoff announced on Twitter that a new Bleachers album would come within the year, though that did not come to pass.

== Promotion ==
Throughout 2020, Bleachers' official Twitter account started teasing the phrase "Take the Sadness Out of Saturday Night" and starting on November 14, 2020, a phone tree was set up for fans to call to hear clips from the song. On November 16, 2020, Bleachers released the lead singles "45" and "Chinatown", the latter featuring Bruce Springsteen. The same day it was announced that the album would be released in 2021. On May 18, 2021, the third single "Stop Making This Hurt" was released, alongside the album's pre-order.

On May 26, 2021, Bleachers performed the song "How Dare You Want More" on The Tonight Show with Jimmy Fallon. The song was released as the album's fourth single on June 9, 2021. Bleachers promoted the album with a 33-city tour across North America. "Secret Life" featuring Lana Del Rey was released as a promotional single on July 28, 2021. "How Dare You Want More" was sent to alternative radio and adult alternative radio on January 24, 2022.

== Composition ==
Take the Sadness Out of Saturday Night is a synth-pop, indie pop, and slow rock album with elements of pop rock, rock n roll, alternative rock, arena rock, alt-pop, folk, baroque pop, rockabilly, and psychedelic music. The album was conceived after a breakup in 2017 and completed during the COVID-19 pandemic. It sees Antonoff expand Bleachers' musical horizons beyond the sounds of the 1980s, with a sound compared to artists like Springsteen, the Beatles, Arcade Fire, Sufjan Stevens, Vampire Weekend, the Chicks, Dirty Beaches, and Destroyer.

== Critical reception ==
Professional ratings
Aggregate scores
Source	Rating
AnyDecentMusic?	6.8/10
Metacritic	71/100
Review scores
Source	Rating
AllMusic	4/5 stars
DIY	4/5 stars
Evening Standard	4/5 stars
Exclaim!	6/10
The Line of Best Fit	6/10
NME	4/5 stars
The Observer	4/5 stars
Pitchfork	6.2/10
Rolling Stone	3.5/5 stars
Under the Radar	7.5/10

According to the review aggregator Metacritic, Take the Sadness Out of Saturday Night received "generally favorable reviews" based on a weighted average score of 71 out of 100 from 14 critic scores.

Jon Blisten of Rolling Stone called the album Bleachers' "most cohesive album yet", and praised Antonoff for expanding the band's sound but criticized some of his lyricism". Ethan Shanfeld of Variety said the album sees Antonoff "shelving his signature grandiosity for a more stripped-down approach". Exclaim! writer Kyle Krohner called the album "at best a heartfelt batch of tracks that are nice to experience in the moment, but rarely anytime after".

Matt Mitchell, writing for Paste gave the album a negative review, calling it "mediocrity promoted as homage, showing itself as hastily thrown-together soundcheck warm-up fusion". Jeremy Larson, writing for Pitchfork, criticized the abundant use of slapback rockabilly-style echo and the solos in one of the songs ("It's rare to find a moment on any record where it seems worth remarking how bad a solo sounds, but there it is"), saying the album is "mostly inspired, sometimes interesting, and occasionally banal".

== Track listing ==
All lyrics are written by Jack Antonoff; "Don't Go Dark" co-written by Lana Del Rey.

Take the Sadness Out of Saturday Night track listing
No.	Title	Music	Producer(s)	Length
1.	"91"	Antonoff; Zadie Smith	Antonoff; Annie Clark; Patrik Berger	2:59
2.	"Chinatown" (featuring Bruce Springsteen)	Antonoff; Evan Smith	Antonoff; Berger	4:04
3.	"How Dare You Want More"	Antonoff; Berger	Antonoff; Berger	4:00
4.	"Big Life"	Antonoff	Antonoff; Berger	2:30
5.	"Secret Life" (featuring Lana Del Rey)	Antonoff; Berger	Antonoff; Berger	3:06
6.	"Stop Making This Hurt"	Antonoff; Berger	Antonoff; Berger	3:19
7.	"Don't Go Dark"	Antonoff; Del Rey	Antonoff; Berger	4:03
8.	"45"	Antonoff	Antonoff; Berger	3:23
9.	"Strange Behavior"	Antonoff	Antonoff	3:05
10.	"What'd I Do with All This Faith?"	Antonoff; Berger	Antonoff; Berger	3:18
Total length:				33:47

== Personnel ==
Musicians

- Jack Antonoff – vocals (all tracks), electric guitar (1–4, 6–8, 10), keyboards (1–3, 7, 9, 10), acoustic guitar (2–10), bass (2–4, 6, 7), drum machine (2), twelve-string guitar (3, 4), drums (3, 4, 6, 7), organ (3), piano (3, 4, 9, 10), percussion (4, 6, 7), synthesizer (4, 7, 10), cello (8)
- Zadie Smith – background vocals (1)
- Patrik Berger – background vocals (1–3, 5, 8, 10), electric guitar (1–5, 7, 8, 10), synthesizer (1, 2, 4), glockenspiel (2, 5), acoustic guitar (3, 5, 8, 10), drums (3, 7), piano (3–5), programming (3, 7), bass (4, 5, 8), twelve-string guitar (5), drum machine (5, 7), tom toms (6), percussion (7)
- Jacob Braun – cello (1, 2, 7)
- Warren Ellis – synthesizer, violin (1)
- Serena McKinney Göransson – violin (1, 2, 7)
- Mikey Freedom Hart – electric guitar (2, 6), background vocals (3, 10), organ (3), bass (6), synthesizer (9)
- Evan Smith – synthesizer (2, 3, 6, 7), saxophone (3, 6, 7, 9, 10), background vocals (4), flute (9, 10)
- Bruce Springsteen – vocals (2)
- Sean Hutchinson – background vocals (3, 4), drums (3, 4, 6, 7), congas (6), percussion (7)
- Michael Riddleberger – background vocals (3, 4), drums (3), percussion (4, 6), snare drum (6)
- Zem Audu – saxophone (3, 6)
- Lana Del Rey – vocals (5), background vocals (7)
- Annie Clark – background vocals (6)
- Blu DeTiger – bass (6)
- Sounwave – programming (6)
- Anna Webber – saxophone (6)
- Bobby Hawk – violin (6)
- The Chicks – background vocals (7)
- Aaron Dessner – piano, synthesizer (7)

Technical

- Chris Gehringer – mastering engineer
- Jack Antonoff – mixing engineer (1, 4, 5, 7, 9, 10)
- Laura Sisk – mixing engineer (1, 4, 5, 7–10), engineer (all tracks)
- Mark "Spike" Stent – mixing engineer (2, 3, 6)
- John Rooney – engineer (3), assistant engineer (1, 2, 4, 5, 7–10)
- Jon Sher – assistant engineer (1–7)
- Will Quinnell – assistant engineer (2–10)
- Matt Wolach – assistant engineer (2, 3, 6)
- Rob Lebret – assistant engineer (2, 6)

Artwork

- Clare Gillen – creative director
- Michelle Holme – design
- Aaron Denton – illustrations
- Carlotta Kohl – photography

== Charts ==
Chart performance for Take the Sadness Out of Saturday Night
Chart (2021)	Peak position
Canadian Albums (Billboard)	69
US Billboard 200	27
US Top Alternative Albums (Billboard)	3
US Top Rock Albums (Billboard)	3
