= Apple vs. 7G =

2021 remix album by A. G. Cook

Remix album by A. G. Cook
- Released: 28 May 2021
- Length: 85:11
- Label: PC Music
- Producers: Cook; Caroline Polachek; Easyfun; Oklou; umru; Boys Noize; Ö; Doss; GRRL; Eartheater; No Rome; caro♡; Baauer; Canblaster; Max Tundra; Kai Whiston

A. G. Cook chronology
Apple (2020)	Apple vs. 7G (2021)	Britpop (2024)

Singles from Apple vs. 7G
- 1. "Beautiful Superstar (Easyfun Remix)" Released: 9 April 2021; 2. "Oh Yeah (Caroline Polachek Remix)" Released: 16 April 2021; 3. "2021 (umru Remix)" Released: 22 April 2021; 4. "The Darkness (Remix)" Released: 29 April 2021; 5. "Xcxoplex (with Charli XCX)" Released: 6 May 2021; 6. "Being Harsh (Oklou Cover)" Released: 20 May 2021; 7. "Windows (No Rome Remix)" Released: 27 May 2021

Apple vs. 7G is the debut remix album by British producer A. G. Cook. It compiles reworked versions of songs from his first two albums 7G and Apple, both released in 2020. It was released on 28 May 2021 by Cook's label PC Music. A deluxe "Silver Edition" includes 7 extra tracks and is exclusively available for purchase on Bandcamp. Many of the remixes featured were premiered on various compilation albums, DJ mixes or hidden zip files prior to Apple vs. 7G's release. The album was promoted by seven singles.

== Background and release ==
A remix album was hinted at before the release of both 7G and Apple in an interview with Crack Magazine stating that hyperpop duo 100 gecs were working on one of his upcoming singles. The future of this remix's release is unclear.

It was later teased days before Apple's release with the announcement of the "Beautiful Superstar" 12", which includes Easyfun's remix of the aforementioned single. "The Darkness (Remix) (with Sarah Bonito and Hannah Diamond)" later leaked in December 2020, when digital media store Boomkat uploaded the track to their site early.

The full album was announced on 7 May 2021. Cook began releasing singles from Apple vs. 7G on 9 April 2021, starting with "Beautiful Superstar (Easyfun Remix)". This was followed by the releases of "Oh Yeah (Caroline Polachek Remix)", "2021 (umru Remix)", "The Darkness (Remix) (with Sarah Bonito and Hannah Diamond", and "Xcxoplex (with Charli XCX)", all released within a week of each other. Oklou's cover of "Being Harsh" was released as a single on 20 May, followed by No Rome's remix of "Windows" on 27 May, the day before the album's release.

== Track listing ==
All tracks written and produced by Cook, except where noted.

No.	Title	Writer(s)	Producer(s)	Length
1.	"Oh Yeah" (Caroline Polachek Remix)		Cook; Polachek^{[b]}	4:58
2.	"Xcxoplex" (with Charli XCX)	Cook; Charlotte Aitchison		2:21
3.	"Beautiful Superstar" (Easyfun Remix)		Cook; Andrew Sarlo^{[a]}; Easyfun^{[b]}	3:27
4.	"Being Harsh" (Oklou Cover)		Cook; Oklou^{[b]}	2:57
5.	"H2O2" (featuring Denzel Himself)			2:37
6.	"2021" (umru Remix)		Cook; umru^{[b]}	3:37
7.	"The Darkness" (Remix) (with Sarah Bonito & Hannah Diamond)	Cook; Hannah Amond; Oscar Pollock; Sarah Bonito		4:06
8.	"Lil Song" (Unplugged) (with jonny gorgeous)	Cook; Daniel Lopatin		1:49
9.	"Stargon" (Boys Noize Remix)		Cook; Boys Noize^{[b]}	5:13
10.	"Lifeline" (Ö Remix)		Cook; Ö^{[b]}	5:42
11.	"Alright" (Dream Mix)	Cook; Tomas Tammemets	Cook; Matt Rad^{[a]}	4:27
12.	"Airhead" (Doss Remix)	Cook; Hayden Dunham; Finn Keane	Cook; Doss^{[b]}	4:31
13.	"Gold Leaf" (GRRL Remix)		Cook; GRRL^{[b]}	5:21
14.	"Today" (Dream Mix)	Billy Corgan		4:15
15.	"The Darkness" (Eartheater Remix)		Cook; Eartheater^{[b]}	3:42
16.	"Windows" (No Rome Remix)		Cook; No Rome^{[b]}	2:08
17.	"Drink Blood" (caro♡ Remix)		Cook; caro♡^{[b]}	3:20
18.	"Beautiful Superstar" (Baauer Remix)		Cook; Sarlo^{[a]}; Baauer^{[b]}	3:42
19.	"Airhead" (Ö & Canblaster Remix)	Cook; Dunham; Keane	Cook; Ö^{[b]}; Canblaster^{[b]}	6:31
20.	"Soft Landing" (Max Tundra Remix)		Cook; Max Tundra^{[b]}	7:05
21.	"Gold Leaf" (Supersaw Edit)			3:04
Total length:				1:25:11

Silver Edition
No.	Title	Writer(s)	Producer(s)	Length
22.	"Xcxoplex vs. Xxoplex"	Cook; Aitchison		2:02
23.	"Haunted" (Dream Mix)			5:42
24.	"The Darkness" (Extended Remix)	Cook; Amond; Pollock; Sarah Bonito		4:57
25.	"2021 (umru Remix) vs. The Darkness" (Remix)	Cook; Amond; Pollock; Sarah Bonito		2:44
26.	"Oohu" (Kai Whiston Remix)		Cook; Kai Whiston^{[b]}	3:12
27.	"DJ Every Night" (DJ Warlord Every Night Remix)	Cook; Amond		3:57
28.	"Silver vs. Silver"			2:45
Total length:				1:50:30

Notes

- ^{^[a]}signifies an additional producer
- ^{^[b]} signifies a remixer
- "Silver vs. Silver" is a mashup of Cook's "Silver" and PC Music artist Astra King's cover of Cook's "Silver".

Sample credits

- "2021 (umru Remix)" contains samples of "Silver" and "Oracle", songs from Cook's 7G album.
- "The Darkness (Extended Remix)" contains samples of "Fade Away", performed by Hannah Diamond, written by Hannah Amond and Cook, "The Princess and the Clock", performed by Kero Kero Bonito, written by Gus Lobban, "Shy", performed by Hannah Diamond, written by Amond and Cook, "Make Believe", performed by Hannah Diamond, written by Amond, Cook and Finn Keane, and "Build it Up", performed by Kero Kero Bonito, written by Lobban, Jamie Bulled, Sarah Bonito and Cook.
