= Stop Making This Hurt =

2021 single by Bleachers

Single by Bleachers

from the album Take the Sadness Out of Saturday Night
- Released: May 18, 2021
- Genre: Pop rock; alt-pop
- Length: 3:19
- Label: RCA
- Songwriters: Jack Antonoff; Patrik Berger
- Producers: Jack Antonoff; Patrik Berger

Bleachers singles chronology
| "Chinatown" (2020) | "Stop Making This Hurt" (2021) | "How Dare You Want More" (2021) |

Music video
- "Stop Making This Hurt" on YouTube

"Stop Making This Hurt" is a song by American indie pop act Bleachers. It released on May 18, 2021, as the third single from their third studio album Take the Sadness Out of Saturday Night. The song was nominated for "Best Alternative" in 2021 MTV Video Music Awards.

A remix of the track by British electronic musician and founder of record label PC Music, A. G. Cook, was released in June 2022, alongside Verdine White's remix of "How Dare You Want More". American singer-songwriter and musician Alaska Reid provides additional vocals on Cook's remix.

== Track listing ==
Stop Making This Hurt (A. G. Cook Remix) / How Dare You Want More (Verdine White of Earth, Wind & Fire Remix) - Single

- "Stop Making This Hurt" (A. G. Cook Remix) – 4:19
- "How Dare You Want More" (Verdine White of Earth, Wind & Fire Remix) – 3:00

== Personnel ==
- Jack Antonoff – vocals, songwriting, production, acoustic guitar, bass, drums, electric guitar, percussion
- Patrik Berger – songwriting, production, tom toms
- Annie Clark – background vocals
- Blu DeTiger – bass
- Sounwave – programming
- Anna – saxophone
- Bobby Hawk – violin
- Evan Smith – saxophone, synthesizer
- Zem - saxophone
- Mikey Freedom Hart – bass, electric guitar
- Sean Hutchinson – congas, drums
- Laura Sisk – engineer
- Chris Gehringer – mastering engineer
- John Rooney – additional producer
- Michael Riddleberger – percussion
- Mike "Spike" Stent – mixing engineer
- Jon Sher – assistant engineer
- Matt Wolach – assistant engineer
- Rob Lebret – assistant engineer
- Will Quinnell – assistant engineer

== Charts ==
Chart performance for "Stop Making This Hurt"
| Chart (2021) | Peak position |
|---|---|
| Canada Rock (Billboard) | 45 |
| US Adult Pop Airplay (Billboard) | 36 |
| US Hot Rock & Alternative Songs (Billboard) | 44 |
| US Rock & Alternative Airplay (Billboard) | 16 |

== Release history ==
Release dates and formats for "Stop Making This Hurt"
| Region | Date | Format | Version | Label | Ref. |
|---|---|---|---|---|---|
| Various | May 18, 2021 | Digital download; streaming | Original | RCA | |
| United States | May 24, 2021 | Triple A radio | Original | RCA | |
| United States | May 25, 2021 | Alternative radio | Original | RCA | |
| Various | June 16, 2022 | Digital download; streaming | A. G. Cook remix | RCA | |
