= Spinning (song) =

2021 single by No Rome, Charli XCX and The 1975

Single by No Rome, Charli XCX, and the 1975
- Released: 4 March 2021
- Recorded: 2018 – 2021
- Genre: Pop; house
- Length: 2:53
- Label: Dirty Hit
- Songwriters: Andrew Wyatt; Charlotte Aitchison; Matthew Healy; George Daniel; Guendoline Rome Gomez
- Producers: Matthew Healy; George Daniel; Guendoline Rome Gomez

No Rome singles chronology
"1:45 AM" (2020)	"Spinning" (2021)

Charli XCX singles chronology
"Charger (Charli XCX Rework)" (2021)	"Spinning" (2021)	"Xcxoplex" (2021)

The 1975 singles chronology
"Guys" (2020)	"Spinning" (2021)	"Part of the Band" (2022)

Music video
- "Spinning" on YouTube

"Spinning" is a song by Filipino musician No Rome, British singer Charli XCX, and English band the 1975. The song was written by Andrew Wyatt, Charli XCX, No Rome and the 1975 members Matty Healy and George Daniel, while the production was handled by the latter three. It was released as a standalone single by Dirty Hit on 4 March 2021. Creation of the song began in 2018 when the producers developed its chorus, beat and production. Charli XCX received the song the following year, writing and recording her portion in one night. The singer later recorded vocals with Healy and Daniel in Sydney, while the song was completed remotely in early 2021.

A pop and house song, "Spinning" was inspired by the desire of No Rome, Charli XCX and the 1975 to develop a creative outlet for themselves, composing the song with an intentionally pop-oriented sound. It incorporates elements of hyperpop, dance-pop and glitch pop, among others, while the beat combines disco, EDM and gospel house. The song's piano house production contains a piano-driven melody and synth drums, accompanied by lyrics performed in an Auto-Tuned style that detail a romance formed at a party.

Upon release, "Spinning" received widespread critical acclaim from contemporary music critics, who praised the song's production, lyrics and Charli XCX's performance. Commercially, it reached number 94 on the UK Singles Chart, number 81 in Ireland, number 38 on the New Zealand Hot Singles chart and number 40 on the US Billboard Hot Rock & Alternative Songs chart. An accompanying music video, directed by Karlos Velásquez, was released on 16 March 2021. The animated visual features No Rome, Charli XCX and Healy as cartoon characters travelling through various locations, including outer space and the deep sea.

== Background and development ==
"We wanted to make a whole world for a song and, you know, we did it. 'Spinning' is like a very creative outlet for the three of us. Everything had a piece of everybody in there, all together."

— No Rome, on the creative process behind "Spinning".

Following the release of the 1975's second studio album I Like It When You Sleep, for You Are So Beautiful yet So Unaware of It (2016), lead singer Matty Healy developed a working relationship with Filipino musician No Rome. After Healy flew No Rome, who he described as "a bit of a muse of [his]", to the UK and signed him to the label Dirty Hit, the pair began working together on the band's upcoming album with drummer and producer George Daniel. Daniel and Healy later produced "Do It Again" from No Rome's third EP RIP Indo Hisashi (2018), while the 1975 co-produced and feature on fellow EP track "Narcissist". In the same year, No Rome co-wrote and provided background vocals for the band's "TooTimeTooTimeTooTime" and later appeared in the song's music video. The 1975's third album A Brief Inquiry into Online Relationships was released in November 2018 and features background vocals and technical production work from No Rome on several songs.

Charli XCX initially planned to collaborate with the 1975 for material on her third album Charli (2019). The singer fell "deeply in love" with the band and visited them in Los Angeles, where they were recording. The musicians spoke about "songs and pop music" and while their collaboration seemed likely, it did ultimately not come to fruition for the album. Following the 2019 Reading Festival, Charli XCX spoke with NME about a potential collaboration with the 1975, revealing she had exchanged several ideas with the band. Describing herself as "such a fan of [Healy] and [the 1975]", the musician noted that their passion for pop music, "energy and ... uniqueness" inspired her, while adding she "really admire[s] [the band's] song writing". However, Charli XCX was unsure about the likelihood of the collaboration. Following the completion of "Spinning", the singer praised the chemistry shared between the different artists, noting they "all speak the same musical language in someway". No Rome described the overall concept of "Spinning" to Franchesca Basbas of Bandwagon as "more so like a song that [t]he 1975 and I produced for [Charli XCX]". He said the artists wanted to make a "fun" song and an "intentional pop tune" that they could "make good videos around".

== Recording ==
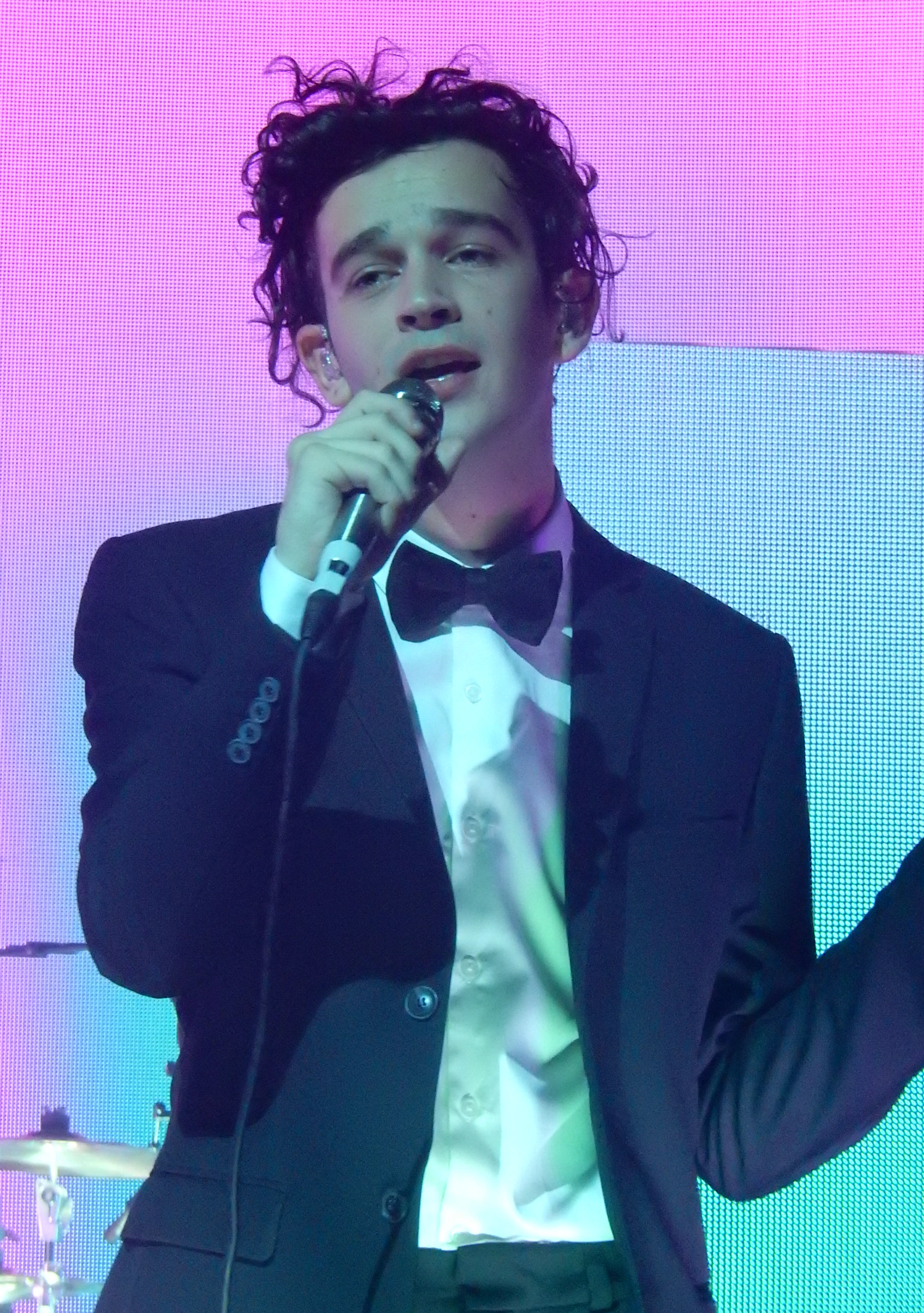
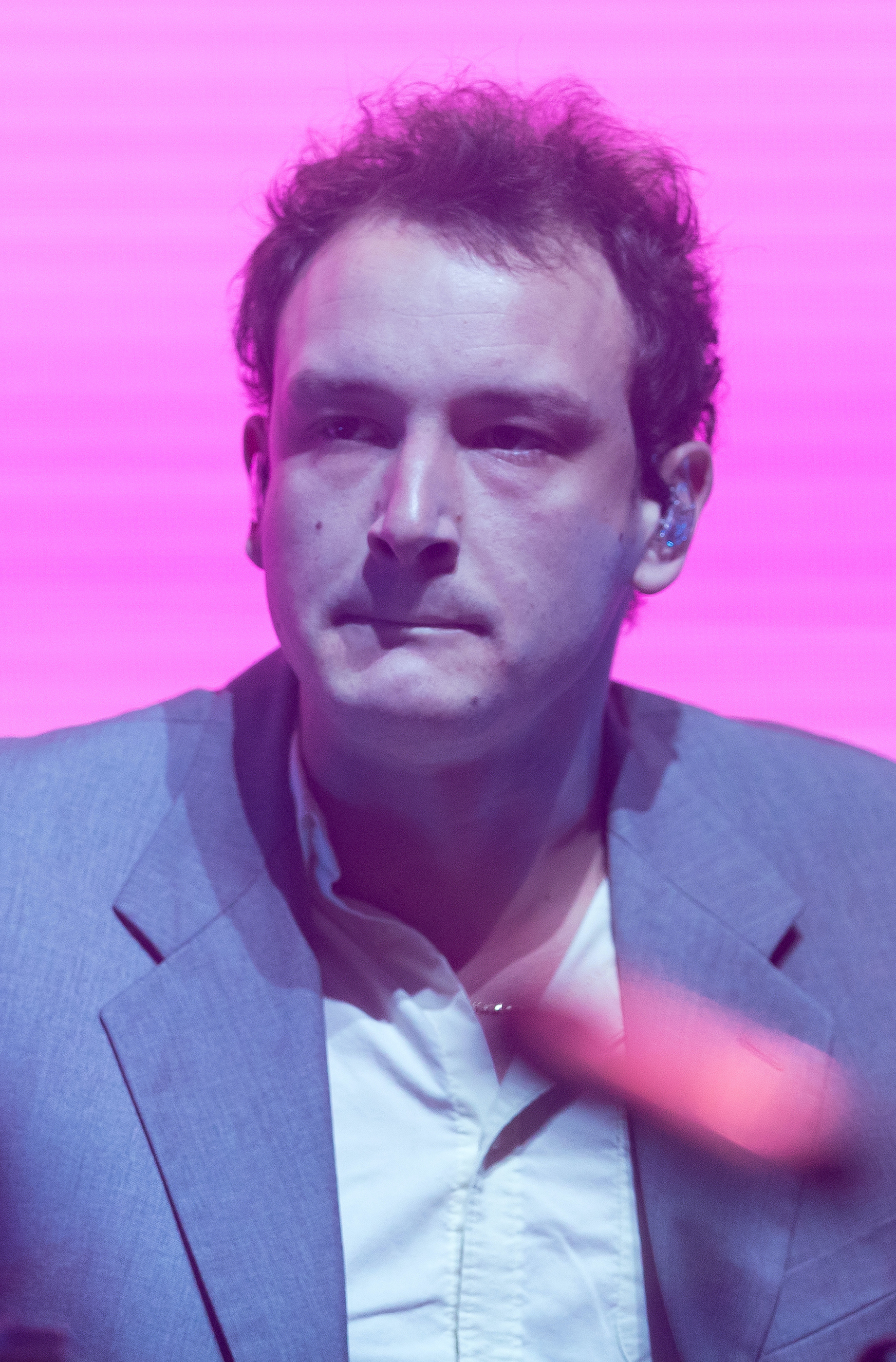
The 1975's lead singer Matty Healy (left) wrote the chorus of "Spinning" in 2018, while the band's drummer George Daniel (right) developed the production with Healy and No Rome that same year

The initial recording of "Spinning" occurred in 2018 when No Rome created the song's beat with Daniel; the singer wrote his part and Healy developed its chorus. Once No Rome completed his portion of the track, he worked alongside Daniel to begin the production. After the initial session with the three artists physically present, most of the remaining recording sessions for "Spinning" occurred remotely. On 9 August 2019, Healy sent the song to Charli XCX at 5 PM and asked if she wished to contribute. Charli XCX immediately began work on the song, completing her recording and sending it back to him the same night. Upon waking up to find her melodies, lyrics and vocals already finished, Healy proclaimed the singer to be "a fucking force" on Twitter. When asked whether he or the 1975 would be featured on the collaboration, Healy said he was undecided but noted that it would be produced by himself alongside Daniel and No Rome.

Following the completion of Charli XCX's part, Healy, Daniels and No Rome continued to work on "Spinning". Speaking with Callie Ahlgrim of Insider, Charli XCX said they "spen[t] time really finessing [the song]", telling the interviewer that the producers took more time to work on ideas in contrast to her fast-paced output. She also noted that following this portion of the song's development, the track was "just sort of sitting around for ages". No Rome opened up that the musicians did not experience any problems creating "Spinning", but it was difficult to have all the artists together since "everyone was on tour and making albums". Healy, Daniel and Charli XCX were able to work on the song while touring Australia and New Zealand as part of the 2020 St Jerome's Laneway Festival, recording vocals for it in Sydney. The artists finished "Spinning" remotely: Charli XCX completed her part in Australia, Healy and Daniel in the UK and No Rome in the Philippines. In February 2021, the latter of the four stated that the mastering of the song was complete.

== Music and lyrics ==
"Spinning"
A 17-second sample of "Spinning" showcasing Charli XCX's Auto-Tuned vocals over a piano house production composed of a piano-driven melody, synth drums and a disco, EDM and gospel house beat.

Musically, "Spinning" is an upbeat pop and house song, with elements of disco, Italo house, hyperpop, dance-pop, glitch pop, UK garage, rave and electronic pop. The track has a length of two minutes and fifty-three seconds (2:53). It was written by Andrew Wyatt, Charli XCX, Daniel, No Rome and Healy, while the latter three were responsible for the production. Built on an "energetic" house beat that combines disco, EDM and 1990s-style gospel house, "Spinning" has a piano house production composed of a piano-driven melody, "bouncy" bassline, "swirling" beats, synth drums and chopped Auto-Tuned vocals. The song details a romance formed with a fellow party-goer, as Charli XCX sings: "Found you at four in the morning / Confidence soaring / Thought you moved onto a new thing / But you keep it revolving." In the chorus, she sings: "You just keep, spinning over there".

Jon Blistein of Rolling Stone called "Spinning" a "euphoric dance pop track", while Alternative Press' Rachael Dowd described it as a "synth-filled pop track" that blends "each artist's unique sounds and styles together". Writing for Paper, Matt Moen said the song is evocative of Silk City's "disco-tinged" dance-pop and the "hyperactive" vocal moments of Passion Pit. Stereogum writer Chris DeVille wrote that "Spinning" would not sound "out of place" on one of the 1975's albums. Contrasting this opinion, Caitlin White of Uproxx felt it is more similar to Charli XCX's discography, although she recognised that the song's "more pure pop elements" invoke the band's earlier work. Jolley wrote the track is the "music[al] equivalent of a dizzy headrush", opining that its release during the midst of the COVID-19 pandemic delivers "a nostalgic sense of longing for those times when you'd lose yourself – and your friends – on a wild night out". Basbas said "Spinning" is "reminiscent of a glowing dancefloor and late-night parties".

== Release ==
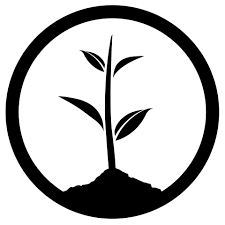
The 1975 will donate their proceeds from an auction of the song's artwork to One Tree Planted.

In January 2021, Healy revealed in an Instagram post that he was collaborating with Charli XCX. On 8 February, No Rome announced on Twitter that a collaboration between Charli XCX, the 1975 and himself would debut sooner than expected, with the former replying via a tweet saying "Sounding good boys". However, the release date and title were not revealed at the time. Charli XCX tweeted on 28 February 2021 that she was excited to work with the two acts, announcing they would be forming a supergroup. On 1 March, the musician made another post revealing the song's name, "Spinning", artwork from the track and its release date. The artwork features live animated characters of No Rome, Charli XCX and Healy against a kaleidoscopic and psychedelic background, which Ben Jolley of Dummy Mag compared to "choose-your-fighter" action figures.

On 3 March 2021, Charli XCX posted a 17-second black and white video of herself dancing to the song. "Spinning" was released by the label on 4 March as a standalone single, while a 7-inch vinyl was released on 28 March. The musicians collaborated with Japanese artist Hideyuki Tanaka and designer Samuel Burgess-Johnson to create animated characters for each of the singers. They partnered with NFT platform Foundation to auction their artwork off to a charity of their choice: No Rome's portion of the profits will go to Right Start, Charli XCX's to Girls Make Beats and the 1975's to One Tree Planted.

== Reception ==
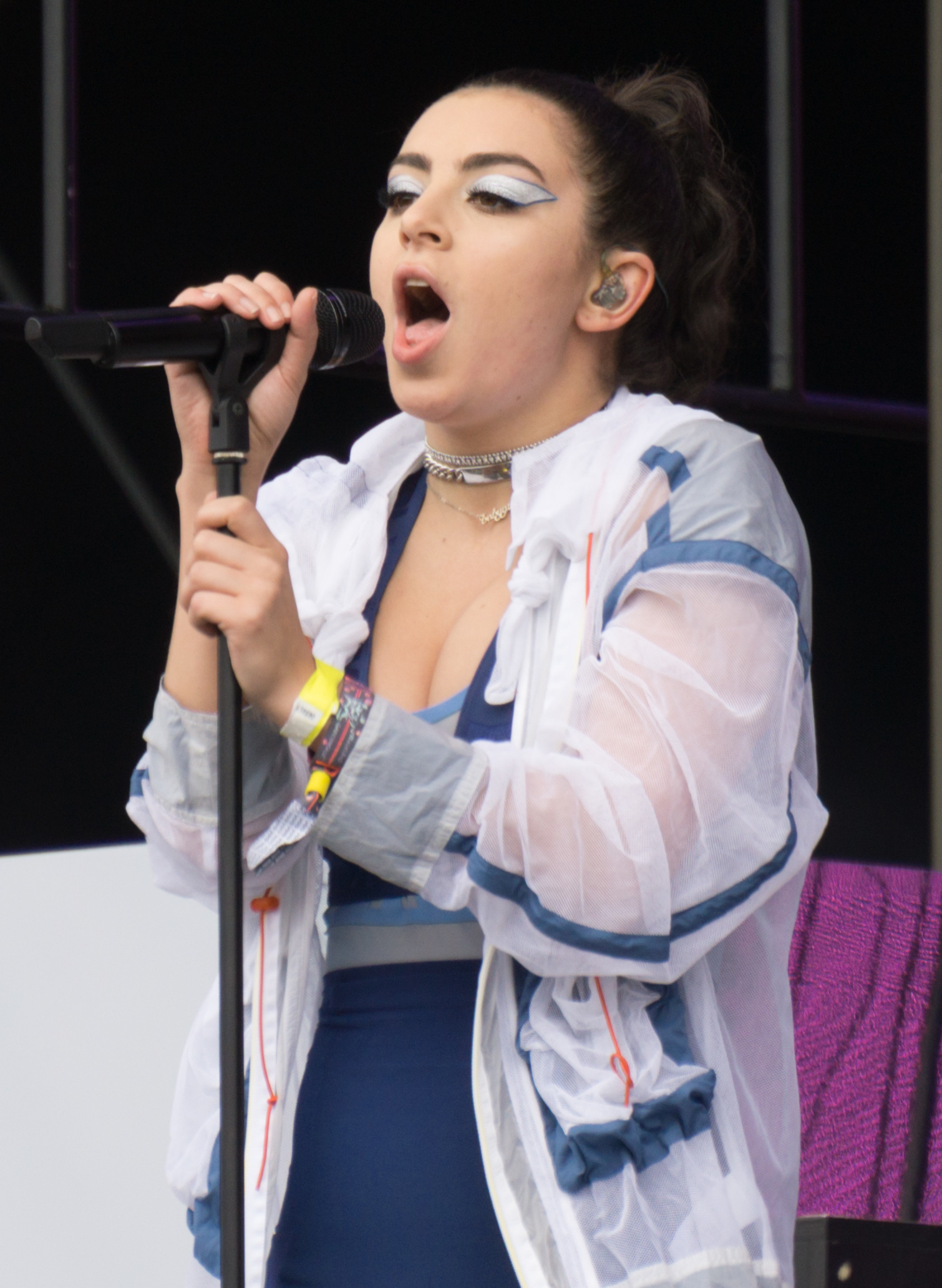
Several critics highlighted Charli XCX's performance on "Spinning".

Upon release, "Spinning" was met with widespread critical acclaim from contemporary music critics. Laura English of Music Feeds commended the song's "fun" house beat and Charli XCX's lyrics and vocals. Writing for The Fader, Jordan Darville also praised Charli XCX's contribution and hailed her as the song's "conductor", while highlighting the composition of "Spinning" for maintaining "the energy of an amazing party's peak for its entire runtime". Jon Pareles of The New York Times opined that the track is "thoroughly danceable and flirtatious" and specifically commended Charli XCX's presence, saying "Spinning" "ends up on [her] turf: teasing, danceable and unstable". In his review of the song, DeVille described it as a "gorgeous blur" and praised the performances of Healy and Charli XCX but had trouble identifying No Rome's vocals. The editorial staff of the Manila Standard deemed the track "pure, joyful, escapist pop" and wrote that it serves as a testament to No Rome's "inimitable talent and endless musical ability".

Stereogum declared "Spinning" as the second-best song of the week for 5 March 2021; DeVille said that "[f]or all intents and purposes, 'Spinning' is a 1975 song" that "expertly strikes their signature balances". Dowd praised the track's "distinct, and downright infectious, pop beats" and compared it to the songs on I Like It When You Sleep, for You Are So Beautiful yet So Unaware of It. Jolley lauded the production, the chorus' "infectious melody" and the "extremely fitting" lyrics of "Spinning", calling the song an "explosion of pent-up energy". DIY's Elly Watson commended the track's "joyful" sound and production and called it "a cute pop song to dance around your living room to". However, Watson felt "Spinning" is not as "mind-blowing" as she expected, given the artists involved. Moen called the song a "total bop"; he highlighted the "fun" melody and "catchy" hook, calling it a "flat out good time from start to finish".

Deeming "Spinning" one of the week's best releases for The Guardian, Jenessa Williams lauded the song's "[19]90s school disco fun" and wrote: "It's nobody’s creative peak, but is a welcome mid-era bop from all three [artists]." Basbas said the track is a "much-needed boost of serotonin for these pandemic-ridden days". Jochan Embley, David Smyth and Nancy Durrant of the Evening Standard included "Spinning" on their music recommendations list, calling it a "delightfully breezy slice of pop" while also expressing their hope that the supergroup would continue releasing new music. Writing for Billboard, Gil Kaufman deemed the song a "dancefloor-ready banger". BrooklynVegan's Amanda Hatfield called "Spinning" an "exuberantly auto-tuned, poppy romp", while Stephen Ackroyd of Dork labelled the song "a pure slice of infectious mega-pop" and noted the mixture of influences from each of the collaborators. Writing for The Line of Best Fit, Cerys Kenneally opined that the track is a "bright anthem". Commercially, "Spinning" reached number 94 on the UK Singles Chart, number 81 in Ireland, number 40 on the US Billboard Hot Rock & Alternative Songs chart and number 38 on the New Zealand Hot Singles chart.

== Music video and promotion ==
No Rome uploaded clips from the music video on Instagram on the same day, including a photo of all three artists against a "mesmerizing" background, while Healy posted a solo shot of himself wearing headphones and a hornlike hat. Daniel later uploaded a photo of him driving an ice cream truck with the license plate "BPM". The visual, directed by Karlos Velásquez, was released on 16 March 2021. The animation was handled by Venturia Animation Studios, Tanaka and Daniel Villa. Speaking on the visual, No Rome said it is "a video inspired by the art that inspires me". The video begins with an animated No Rome slipping into a puddle which transports him to a different universe. Joining the cartoon characters of Charli XCX and Healy, the trio adventure through the deep sea in submarines, float around in outer space, smoke joints and eat ice cream. Blistein called the visual a "bonkers animated adventure" and wrote that it is a "fittingly dazzling" companion to the song. Margaret Farrell of Flood Magazine deemed the video "too adorable to capture completely in words". Coup de Main's Shahlin Graves called the music video "adorable", while Will Richards of NME described the visual as an "animated wonderland". To further promote "Spinning", the artists released new merchandise, including a colouring book illustrated by Tanaka with scenes from and inspired by the music video, as well as a 7-inch vinyl, a tie-dye t-shirt and a long sleeve shirt.

== Track listing ==
Digital download

1. "Spinning" – 2:52

Digital Remix EP

1. "Spinning" (A. G. Cook Remix) – 2:55
2. "Spinning" (A. G. Cook Club Remix) – 4:36
3. "Spinning" – 2:52

7-inch vinyl

1. "Spinning" – 2:52
2. "Spinning" (A. G. Cook Remix) – 2:52

== Charts ==
Chart performance for "Spinning"
Chart (2021)	Peak position
Ireland (IRMA)	81
New Zealand Hot Singles (RMNZ)	38
UK Singles (Official Charts)	94
US Hot Rock & Alternative Songs (Billboard)	40

== Release history ==
Release history and formats for "Spinning"
Region	Date	Format(s)	Label	Ref.
Various	4 March 2021	Digital download; streaming	Dirty Hit	
Various	21 May 2021	Digital Remix EP	Dirty Hit	
Various	28 May 2021	7-inch vinyl	Dirty Hit	

== See also ==
- List of songs by Matty Healy
