= Alaska Reid =

American singer-songwriter (born 1996)

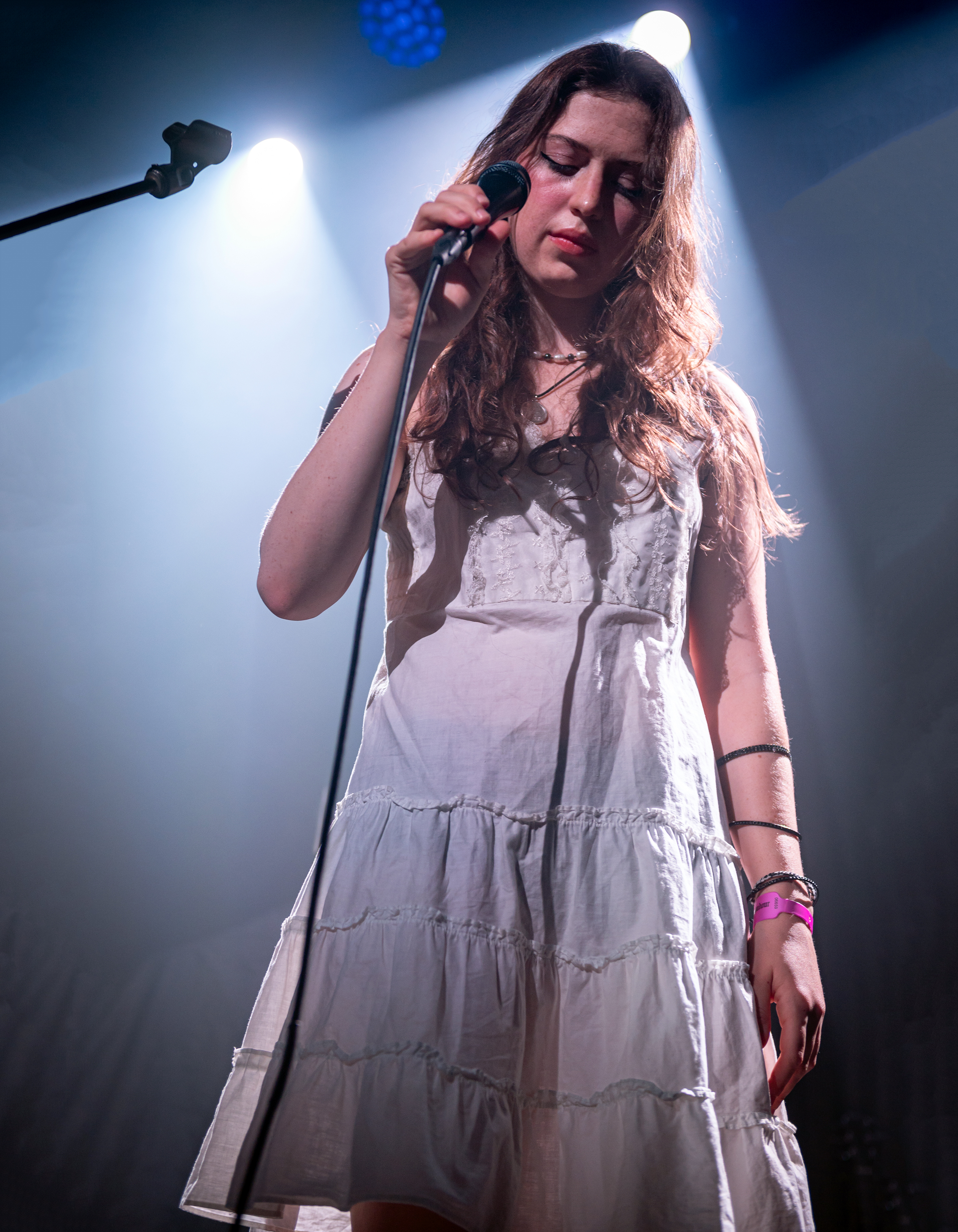
- Reid in 2023

Background information
- Born: Sophia Alaska Reid Michigan, U.S.
- Origin: Montana, U.S.
- Genres: Folk-pop; indie rock
- Occupations: Singer-songwriter; musician
- Instruments: Vocals; guitar
- Years active: 2015–present
- Labels: Luminelle Recordings; Terrible Records (former)

Sophia Alaska Reid (born 1996), known professionally as Alaska Reid, is an American singer-songwriter and musician. She is known for her electronic and country-tinged indie rock sound and narrative-driven lyrical content. She has collaborated numerous times with boyfriend A. G. Cook.

She initially began releasing music with her band Alyeska in 2015, releasing an EP titled Crush in April 2017. She began releasing solo material in 2019 with her debut single "Quake". She released her first full-length released titled Big Bunny in December 2020, under Terrible Records. Her debut album Disenchanter was released on 14 July 2023 via Luminelle Recordings.

In 2024, Reid began a new project with Scottish musician Dylan Fraser, releasing music under the band name Witch Post.

== Early life ==
Reid was born in Michigan and moved to Montana when she was four years old. Reid is one of five children. She grew up in Park County, Montana, and went to high school in Los Angeles. She took up singing lessons from age 6 until age 20. She started writing music and performing at gigs on the Sunset Strip at age 14, such as The Pig & Whistle, House of Blues and The Viper Room. She additionally appeared in the fourth episode in the eleventh season of Criminal Minds.

She cites The Breeders, Dinosaur Jr., Joni Mitchell, country music and americana as early influences on her. She also cites initial feelings of frustration because of the way she was perceived as a young female singer-songwriter.

== Career ==
Reid formed the band, Alyeska. They released their debut EP Crush in April 2017, produced by John Agnello. The sound of the band has been described as raw and "punky". Alyeska additionally appeared in the film Viena and the Fantomes. The band eventually split.

Reid released her A. G. Cook-produced debut solo single, "Quake", in May 2019. It was noted as being "decidedly poppier" than her previous efforts with Alyeska. This was followed by "Mermaid Tears" in September 2019.

Her next single, "Amber", was released in March 2020. She additionally performed vocals on Alex Somers' score for the Apple TV+ animated special, Here We Are: Notes for Living on Planet Earth in April 2020. Reid announced her signing to indie label Terrible Records in August 2020, alongside the release of her single "Boys From Town". Reid additionally appeared heavily on A. G. Cook's two 2020 albums, 7G and Apple. Reid then announced her debut EP, Big Bunny, with the release of the single, "Oblivion". Big Bunny was released on 11 December 2020, preceded by the two single releases of "Big Bunny", and "Warm".

In March 2021, Reid released the "Oblivion Tears" double single, reworked versions of "Mermaid Tears" and "Oblivion", produced by Cook. Reid, Cook and other frequent collaborator Waylon Rector (a.k.a. jonny gorgeous) released a cover of "Bad Moon Rising" under the pseudonym, Minotaur Jr.. A cover of Dinosaur Jr.'s 1994 single "Feel the Pain" was released in May 2021.

"Always" was released as the lead single in October 2021 for her next release, and toured the US with indie rock outfit Del Water Gap until early December 2021. She spent 2022 working on her next release, and supporting Charli XCX during Crash: The Live Tour, as well as Porches, Magdalena Bay and the Drums. In February 2023, she supported Maya Hawke on her European tour. In March 2023, Reid released "Back To This" as a single from her album Disenchanter, released on 14 July 2023 via Gorilla vs Bear's Luminelle Recordings label.

In 2021, Reid met Scottish musician Dylan Fraser. The two began collaborating, eventually landing on the band name Witch Post. The pair released their first EP in 2025, and a second in 2026.

== Personal life ==
Reid divides her time between Montana and Los Angeles.

One of Reid's siblings is actress and artist Lilliya Scarlett Reid. Lilliya and Alaska collaborate frequently, with Lilliya appearing in, as well as directing Alaska's music videos.

Reid began a relationship with English music producer, singer and head of record label PC Music, A. G. Cook in 2018. Since they began dating, they have frequently collaborated with each other. He quarantined with her and her family in Montana during the 2020 COVID-19 pandemic. He helped produce Charli XCX's how i'm feeling now album while in Montana.

== Discography ==
=== Albums ===
Disenchanter (2023)

All tracks written by Alaska Reid, except where noted.

All tracks produced by A. G. Cook, except tracks 2 and 10, produced by Reid and Cook, and track 7, produced by Reid.

No.	Title	Writer(s)	Length
1.	"French Fries"	Reid; Max Hershenow	2:57
2.	"Dogs & Girls"		2:50
3.	"She Wonders"		3:25
4.	"Leftover"		3:33
5.	"Palomino"	Reid; Cook; Waylon Rector	4:01
6.	"Back To This"	Reid; Cook	3:10
7.	"Arctic Heart"		3:09
8.	"Always"	Reid; Hershenow	2:13
9.	"Seeds"		3:25
10.	"Airship"		3:51
Total length:			32:34

=== EPs ===
Big Bunny (2020)
No.	Title	Writer(s)	Producer(s)	Length
1.	"Big Bunny"	Reid	Cook	3:40
2.	"Warm"	Reid; Hershenow	Hershenow; Cook^{[a]}	3:26
3.	"Oblivion"	Reid; Cook; Rodaidh McDonald	Cook; McDonald	4:11
4.	"Quake"	Reid; Cook	Cook	3:27
5.	"City Sadness"	Reid	Reid; Rector	3:29
6.	"Boys From Town"	Reid; Tom Stafford; Cook	Stafford; Cook^{[a]}	3:39
7.	"Mermaid Tears"	Reid	Andrew Sarlo	3:03
8.	"Blood Ice"	Reid	McDonald	3:08
9.	"Pilot"	Reid	Reid; Rector	4:16
Total length:				32:23

Vinyl bonus track
No.	Title	Writer(s)	Producer(s)	Length
10.	"Amber"	Reid; Hershenow	Hershenow; Cook^{[a]}	2:59
Total length:				35:22

Notes

- ^{^[a]}signifies an additional producer

=== Singles ===
Title	Year	Album
"Quake"	2019	Big Bunny
"Mermaid Tears"	2019	Big Bunny
"Amber"	2020	Big Bunny
"Boys From Town"	2020	Big Bunny
"Oblivion"	2020	Big Bunny
"Big Bunny"	2020	Big Bunny
"Warm"	2020	Big Bunny
"Mermaid Tears" (Midnight)	2021	Oblivion Tears
"Oblivion" (Midnight)	2021	Oblivion Tears
"Feel the Pain"	2021	Non-album single
"Always"	2021	Disenchanter
"Back To This"	2023	Disenchanter
"She Wonders"	2023	Disenchanter
"Palomino"	2023	Disenchanter
"French Fries"	2023	Disenchanter

=== Guest appearances ===
Title	Year	Other artist(s)	Album
"Sun Begins to Pour"	2016	Koresma	Non-album single
"Modern World"	2018	Collapsing Scenery	Let's Burn Down the Cornfield / Modern World
"Spins Around Us"	2020	Alex Somers	Here We Are (Apple TV+ Original Motion Picture Soundtrack)
"Here We Are"	2020	Alex Somers	Here We Are (Apple TV+ Original Motion Picture Soundtrack)
"Find Your Way"	2020	Alex Somers	Here We Are (Apple TV+ Original Motion Picture Soundtrack)
"Own Light"	2020	Alex Somers	Here We Are (Apple TV+ Original Motion Picture Soundtrack)
"Floating In Space"	2020	Alex Somers	Here We Are (Apple TV+ Original Motion Picture Soundtrack)
"Light Source"	2020	Alex Somers	Here We Are (Apple TV+ Original Motion Picture Soundtrack)
"Clear Night"	2020	Alex Somers	Here We Are (Apple TV+ Original Motion Picture Soundtrack)
"Long Way"	2020	Alex Somers	Here We Are (Apple TV+ Original Motion Picture Soundtrack)
"Constellations"	2020	Alex Somers	Here We Are (Apple TV+ Original Motion Picture Soundtrack)
"Into Place"	2020	Alex Somers	Here We Are (Apple TV+ Original Motion Picture Soundtrack)
"Green Beauty"	2020	A. G. Cook	7G
"Crimson and Clover"	2020	A. G. Cook	7G
"Just What I Needed"	2020	Minotaur Jr., jonny gorgeous, A. G. Cook	Appleville (Golden Ticket)
"Oh Yeah"	2020	A. G. Cook	Apple
"Beautiful Superstar"	2020	A. G. Cook	Apple
"Haunted"	2020	A. G. Cook	Apple
"That's How I Don't Love You"	2020	—N/a	Non-album single
"Oblivion (Pop Carol Mix)"	2020	—N/a	Pop Caroler's Songbook
"Mermaid Tears (Pop Carol Mix)"	2020	—N/a	Pop Caroler's Songbook
"Being Shy"	2021	jonny gorgeous	Jonny Relax
"Bad Moon Rising"	2021	Minotaur Jr., jonny gorgeous, A. G. Cook	Non-album single
"Machine"^{^{[b]}}	2021	Messer	Roses
"Stop Making This Hurt (A. G. Cook Remix)"	2022	Bleachers, A. G. Cook	Non-album single
"Vampire"	2022	Dylan Fraser	2030 Revolution
"If I Knew"	2023	Thy Slaughter	Soft Rock
"Come & Gone"	2024	Lewis OfMan	Cristal Medium Blue
"Luddite Factory Operator"	2024	A. G. Cook	Britpop
"Pink Mask"	2024	A. G. Cook	Britpop

Notes

- ^{^[b]} signifies a non-vocal, guitar-only appearance.
