= Witch Post (band) =

Indie rock duo

- Genre: Indie rock
- Years active: 2024 - present
- Label: Partisan
- Members: Dylan Fraser, Alaska Reid
- Website: https://witchpost.online/

Witch Post is a London-based indie rock duo consisting of Dylan Fraser of Scotland and Alaska Reid from the United States. Both musicians had solo careers before meeting online and working together on Witch Post. The duo has released two albums, Beast (2025) and Butterfly (2026).
