= The Moment (The Score) =

Film score by A. G. Cook
- Released: 30 January 2026
- Genres: Electronic; techno; ambient
- Length: 40:41
- Label: A24
- Producer: A. G. Cook

A. G. Cook chronology
Britpop (2024)	The Moment (The Score) (2026)

Singles from The Moment (The Score)
- 1. "Dread" Released: 12 December 2025; 2. "Offscreen" Released: 15 January 2026; 3. "Residue" Released: 27 January 2026

The Moment (The Score) is the film score composed by English producer A. G. Cook to the mockumentary film The Moment directed by Aidan Zamiri and produced by Cook's long-time collaborator Charli XCX and David Hinojosa. The soundtrack album was released through A24 Music day-and-date with the film on 30 January 2026. It is Cook's first film score.

== Background ==
Cook read the script for The Moment in January 2025. Prevented from traveling to Los Angeles due to the January 2025 Southern California wildfires, Cook used the extra free time at home to start working on the film score. That enabled the director Zamiri and the cast to listen to parts of the score as they were filming. Cook intentionally refused to use Charli XCX's vocals, wanting her to use her voice only when it's seen on the screen.

A fan of David Lynch's work and Angelo Badalamenti's soundtracks for Lynch's Twin Peaks (1990–1991; 2017) and Mulholland Drive (2001), Cook rewatched Mulholland Drive for inspiration, as he felt it was thematically similar to The Moment.

== Release ==
The Moment (The Score) was preceded by three singles. "Dread" was released as a lead single on 12 December 2025. Charli had previously premiered "Dread" at the end of her Coachella 2025 set. "Offscreen" was released as the second single on 15 January 2026. Alongside its release, the full tracklist to the score was unveiled.

The third and final single, "Residue", was released on 27 January 2026, three days before the release of the score and the film. It was accompanied by a music video, released the same day and directed by Zamiri. The video stars Charli entering a warehouse filled with her doppelgangers headbanging in front of a screen displaying lyrics from her 2024 studio album Brat. The doppelgangers include Kylie Jenner, who also stars in the film.

== Composition ==
The Moment (The Score) contains ten tracks. Its opening track, the third single "Residue", is a club-oriented, instrumental techno track. The second track, "Depth", offers soft-focus piano melancholy. The third track, "Momentism", was compared to Phuture's 1987 single "Acid Tracks". It is followed by "Fraud", which was described by Clash's James Mellen as "feel[ing] as if Cook signed Gesaffelstein to PC Music, the track fitting into the format of the latter's Conspiracy EPs."

The dance instrumental "Offscreen", the sixth track and the second single, was described as "Cook in his most recognisable form" and compared to his 2024 studio album Britpop. "Removal", the eighth track, is more gentle, operating more as a soundscape or ambient piece. A reprise of "Depth" follows, before the record closes with "Dread", its lead single. It heavily samples "I Love It" (2012) by Icona Pop featuring Charli XCX. Tom Breihan of Stereogum described the track as a "clubby synth-blare that's been transformed into an ominous drone."

== Critical reception ==
Professional ratings
Review scores
Source	Rating
Clash	7/10
The Line of Best Fit	5/10

In a positive review, Mellen wrote that the album is "either delicate, expansive synthwave motifs or hammering percussion and synthesisers. The sound A. G. Cook is known and adored for." He also expressed surprise at how long it took Cook to make his film scoring debut, concluding: "He may well be to Zamiri what Greenwood is to PTA, or what Hurwitz is to Chazelle." In an otherwise mixed review of the film, Adrian Horton of The Guardian described Cook's score as "jagged, pulsating", stating that it "fits seamlessly into the chaos of a celebrity willing to play herself as a monster boss, and to toy with the expectations of a tour film." Gregory Nussen of Screen Rant dubbed the score "thumping", Ellise Shafer of Variety dubbed it "electrifying", while Glenn Garner of Deadline said it "add[ed] an emotional tinge to Charli's already visceral music".

In a mixed review, Rhys Morgan of The Line of Best Fit wrote that the album is, "often, too obedient to the function of scoring. Large stretches behave as fairly placid connective tissue – competent atmosphere, sanitised ambience – and when the sound is extrapolated from the image, that dutifulness can read as stagnant." Morgan concluded that it works as accompaniment, but is uneven as an album.

== Track listing ==
All tracks are written by Alexander Guy Cook, except where noted, and produced by A. G. Cook.

The Moment (The Score) track listing
No.	Title	Writer(s)	Length
1.	"Residue"		3:28
2.	"Depth"		3:39
3.	"Momentism"		1:51
4.	"Fraud"		3:39
5.	"Don't Sleep"		4:37
6.	"Offscreen"		5:34
7.	"Bird in the Rafters"		3:12
8.	"Removal"		6:28
9.	"Depth (Reprise)"		2:24
10.	"Dread"	Cook; Charlotte Aitchison; Patrik Berger; Linus Eklöw	5:49
Total length:			40:41

LP track listing
No.	Title	Length
11.	Untitled	3:21
Total length:		44:02

Notes

- "Dread" contains samples of "I Love It" (2012), written by Charlotte Aitchison, Patrik Berger and Linus Eklöw, and performed by Icona Pop featuring Charli XCX.

== Personnel ==
Credits adapted from Tidal.

- A. G. Cook – all instruments, production, mixing, arrangement on "Dread"
- Robin Schmidt – mastering
- Mitchell Schneider – arrangement on "Dread"
