= Chinatown (Bleachers song) =

2020 single by Bleachers featuring Bruce Springsteen

Single by Bleachers featuring Bruce Springsteen

from the album Take the Sadness Out of Saturday Night
- B-side: "45"
- Released: 16 November 2020
- Genre: Heartland rock; synth-pop; shoegaze; indie pop
- Length: 4:08
- Label: RCA
- Songwriters: Jack Antonoff; Evan Smith
- Producers: Jack Antonoff; Patrik Berger

Bleachers singles chronology
"45" (2020)	"Chinatown" (2020)	"Stop Making This Hurt" (2021)

Bruce Springsteen singles chronology
"Ghosts" (2020)	"Chinatown" (2020)	"The Power of Prayer" (2020)

Music video
- "Chinatown" on YouTube

"Chinatown" is a song by American indie pop act Bleachers featuring American singer-songwriter Bruce Springsteen. The song was released alongside "45" on November 16, 2020, as the dual lead singles from Bleachers' third studio album Take the Sadness Out of Saturday Night, which was released on July 30, 2021. The act performed the song, along with "How Dare You Want More", in the January 15, 2022 episode of Saturday Night Live.

== Critical reception ==
Jon Pareles writing for The New York Times praised Bruce Springsteen's guest appearance, saying "Springsteen’s voice appears as if out of a mist, like the apparition of a patron saint".

== Music video ==
The song's official music video, directed by Carlotta Kohl, has been described as "nostalgic" and documents a man's journey from New York City to New Jersey, mirroring both singers' relationships to the state.

== Track listing ==
7-inch vinyl

- "Chinatown" (featuring Bruce Springsteen)' – 4:08
- "45" – 3:45

== Personnel ==
Credits taken from Tidal.

- Jack Antonoff – lead vocals, songwriter, producer, acoustic guitar, bass, drum machine, keyboards
- Bruce Springsteen – featured vocals
- Patrik Berger – background vocals, producer, electric guitar, glockenspiel, synthesizer
- Jacob Braun – cello
- Chris Gehringer – mastering engineer
- Serena McKinney Göransson – violin
- Mikey Freedom Hart – electric guitar
- Sean Hutchinson – percussion
- Rob Lebert – assistant engineer
- Laura Lisk – recording engineer
- Will Quinnell – assistant engineer
- Michael Riddleberger – percussion
- John Rooney – assistant engineer
- Jon Sher – assistant engineer
- Mark "Spike" Stent – mixing engineer
- Evan Smith – songwriter, synthesizer
- Matt Wolach – assistant engineer

== Charts ==
Chart performance for "Chinatown"
Chart (2020–2021)	Peak position
US Adult Alternative Airplay (Billboard)	14
US Hot Rock & Alternative Songs (Billboard)	47

== Release history ==
Release dates and formats for "Chinatown"
Region	Date	Format	Label	Ref.
Various	November 17, 2020	Digital download; streaming; 7-inch record	RCA	
United States	November 23, 2020	Adult alternative radio	RCA	
