= Bradley & Pablo =

British director duo

Bradley & Pablo, composed of Bradley Bell and Pablo Jones-Soler, are a British director duo. They are known for directing high-energy and visually-striking music videos and commercials.

== Career ==
The duo met in London while studying graphic design at Central Saint Martins and Chelsea College of Art in 2010 and soon after directed their first music video “Hey QT” by QT. The video received critical acclaim and became the first in a series of collaborations with the influential PC Music label and Charli XCX. They have subsequently gone on to collaborate with major artists including Harry Styles, Dua Lipa, Rosalía, Lil Nas X, Tate McRae, and Cardi B.

When the COVID-19 pandemic hit in 2020, the duo reached out to their frequent collaborator Charli XCX to document her recording her album How I'm Feeling Now while in quarantine. Their debut feature documentary Charli XCX: Alone Together (2021) was the result, documenting the artist and her fan's experience coping with the pandemic and coming together through online platforms to collaborate on the album. The film premiered as the headliner at the 2021 SXSW Film Festival and was released on Hulu and BBC iPlayer.

In 2021, the duo directed "first-of-its-kind short-form drama series" Fracture (2021) for luxury fashion house Balmain, partnered with Channel 4. The series "follows a creatively stuck singer-songwriter who is holed up in a grungily glam fictional L.A. motel, as she tries to get distance from her privileged and complicated upbringing", and featured Jesse Jo Stark, Tommy Dorfman, Charles Melton, and Ajani Russel.

Bradley & Pablo have since directed commercials for brands such as Heineken, Bose, and Fossil.

== Music Videos ==
Year	Title	Artist
2015	"Hey QT"	QT
2015	"Hi"	Hannah Diamond
2016	"Vroom Vroom"	Charli XCX
2016	"Super Natural"	Danny L Harle feat. Carly Rae Jepsen
2017	"Just Hold On"	Steve Aoki & Louis Tomlinson
2017	"Taker"	K.I.D.
2017	"Say You Do"	Tei Shi
2017	"MotorSport"	Migos feat. Nicki Minaj and Cardi B
2018	"Tongue"	MNEK
2018	"Like That"	Kris Wu
2018	"5 in the Morning"	Charli XCX
2018	"Colour"	MNEK feat. Hailee Steinfeld
2018	"Electricity"	Silk City & Dua Lipa feat. Diplo & Mark Ronson
2019	"Think About Us"	Little Mix feat. Ty Dolla $ign
2019	"Hear Me Calling"	Juice WRLD
2019	"Aute Cuture"	Rosalía
2019	"Blame It on Your Love"	Charli XCX feat. Lizzo
2019	"Find U Again"	Mark Ronson feat. Camila Cabello
2019	"2099"	Charli XCX feat. Troye Sivan
2019	"Sweettalk My Heart"	Tove Lo
2020	"Rodeo"	Lil Nas X feat. Nas
2020	"Business Woman"	Nathy Peluso
2020	"React"	The Pussycat Dolls
2020	"Watermelon Sugar"	Harry Styles
2021	"Faking Love"	Anitta feat. Saweetie
2022	"Late Night Talking"	Harry Styles
2023	"Seven"	Jung Kook feat. Latto
2024	"2 Hands"	Tate McRae
2025	"Love Hangover"	Jennie & Dominic Fike
2025	"Down to be wrong"	Haim

== Awards and recognition ==
Film Festival Selections
Year	Film	Festival
2021	Charli XCX: Alone Together	SXSW Film Festival
2021	Charli XCX: Alone Together	Sheffield DocFest
2021	Charli XCX: Alone Together	Inside Out
2022	Charli XCX: Alone Together	BFI Flare: London LGBTIQ+ Film Festival

Cannes Lions
Year	Work	Award
2024	Heineken 150th Anniversary "Whatever You Call Us"	Gold Lion - Direct
2024	Heineken 150th Anniversary "Whatever You Call Us"	Silver Lion - Direct
2024	Heineken 150th Anniversary "Whatever You Call Us"	Bronze Lion - Creative Strategy

Clio Awards
Year	Work	Award
2025	"Seven" by Jung Kook feat. Latto	Bronze Award in Film Craft: Direction

D&AD Awards
Year	Work	Award
2024	Heineken 150th Anniversary "Whatever You Call Us"	Shortlist / Direct / Integrated / 2024
2024	Heineken 150th Anniversary "Whatever You Call Us"	Shortlist / Direct / Products & Services

The One Show
Year	Work	Award
2023	Zen Business "Own What's Yours"	Merit Award
2024	Heineken 150th Anniversary "Whatever You Call Us"	Gold Pencil Award

Kantar Creative Effectiveness Awards
Year	Work	Award
2024	Heineken 150th Anniversary "Whatever You Call Us"	Most Creative Effective Ad in TV

MTV Music Video Awards
Year	Work	Nomination
2019	"Electricity" by Silk City & Dua Lipa feat. Diplo & Mark Ronson	Best Dance Music Video

UK Music Video Awards
Year	Work	Nomination
2019	"Aute Cuture" by Rosalía	Best International Pop Video
2023	"Seven" by Jung Kook feat. Latto	Best International Pop Video

BET Awards
Year	Work	Nomination
2018	"MotorSport" by Migos feat. Nicki Minaj and Cardi B	Coca-Cola Viewers' Choice Award

MVPA Awards
Year	Nomination
2021	Best Director

MVF Awards (Music Video Festival)
Year	Work	Nomination
2019	"Aute Cuture" by Rosalía	Best International Music Video

Berlin Fashion Film Festival
Year	Work	Nomination
2014	Stain Glass Story	Best VFX
2015	"Hey QT" by QT	Best Beauty

== Reception ==
Bradley & Pablo's work has also been listed on numerous "best of" lists with their video for Harry Style's "Watermelon Sugar" appearing on Rolling Stone's "Best Music Videos of All Time". Rolling Stone writes, "By the time it debuted, to a world in lockdown, there was something poignant about seeing sensual party people lustily fondle fruit (and each other) in the sunshine, grinding on the rinds. And whatever the melons are into, he’s OK with it. Music videos have always celebrated the sexy-beach trope. Harry makes it feel brand new, crowning himself the consent king of the fructosexual future."

"Best Of" Lists
Year	Work	List
2015	"Hey QT" by QT	Crack Magazine’s Videos of the Year 2015
2015	"Hey QT" by QT	FACT’s Best Music Videos of 2015
2016	"Super Natural" by Danny L Harle feat. Carly Rae Jepsen	DAZED’s Best Music Videos of the Month
2016	"Super Natural" by Danny L Harle feat. Carly Rae Jepsen	Best Canadian Music Videos of the Year
2016	"Vroom Vroom" by Charli XCX	Stereogum's Best Music Videos of 2016
2018	"Tongue" by MNEK	Popbuzz’s Best Music Videos of 2018
2018	"Tongue" by MNEK	Huffington Post’s Best Music Videos of 2018
2018	"Electricity" Silk City & Dua Lipa feat. Diplo & Mark Ronson	Pitchfork’s Best Music Videos of September 2018
2018	"Electricity" Silk City & Dua Lipa feat. Diplo & Mark Ronson	MTV's Best Music Videos of 2018
2020	"Watermelon Sugar" by Harry Styles	USA Today's Best Music Videos of 2020
2020	"Watermelon Sugar" by Harry Styles	MTV Video Play Awards - Top 10 Music Videos
2020	"Watermelon Sugar" by Harry Styles	Indiewire’s Best Music Videos’s of 2020
2020	"Watermelon Sugar" by Harry Styles	Billboard’s Best Music Video of 2020 (Fan poll)
2020	"Watermelon Sugar" by Harry Styles	Billboard Best Music Video of 2020 (Staff Picks)
2021	"Watermelon Sugar" by Harry Styles	Rolling Stone's Best Music Videos of All Time
