= A. G. Cook =

English record producer (born 1990)

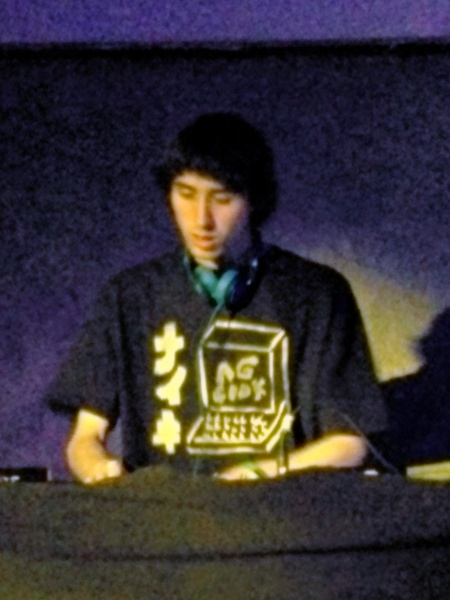
- Cook performing in 2015

Background information
- Also known as: DJ Lifeline; DJ Warlord
- Born: Alexander Guy Cook; 23 August 1990 (age 36)
- Origin: London, England
- Genres: Electronic; pop; hyperpop; bubblegum bass
- Occupations: Music producer; songwriter; record executive
- Works: Discography
- Years active: 2011–present
- Labels: Gamsonite; PC Music; New Alias; A24 Music
- Member of: Thy Slaughter; Lipgloss Twins; Pobbles
- Website: agcook.com

Alexander Guy Cook (born 23 August 1990) is an English record producer. He first became known as founder of the influential record label PC Music in 2013; its signees included Hannah Diamond, GFOTY, Danny L Harle and Felicita. The label's style of exaggerated pop tropes grew to serve as the foundation of the hyperpop genre, which Cook is credited for developing and popularising. He later became more widely known as executive producer for Charli XCX. He has released solo music under both his name (as A. G. Cook) and aliases like DJ Lifeline and DJ Warlord.

Cook formed the one-off project, QT, with musician Sophie and performance artist Hayden Dunham, producing the 2014 single "Hey QT". He released his first solo singles in that same year, and was named number 12 in the Dazed 100 for "redefining style and youth culture in 2015 and beyond". He served as executive producer on Charli XCX's mixtapes Number 1 Angel and Pop 2 (both 2017), and albums Charli (2019), How I'm Feeling Now (2020), Brat (2024) and Music, Fashion, Film (2026).

Cook's first two albums, 7G and Apple (both 2020), both explored hyperpop and were met with critical praise. That same year, he won the Variety Hitmakers Innovator of The Year Award in 2020. In 2022, he co-produced the song "All Up in Your Mind" from Beyoncé's album Renaissance, which earned him a Grammy nomination for the Album of the Year, and he released his third album, Britpop, in 2024. He continued to produce for Charli XCX with Brat (2024) and its remix album, winning the Grammy Award for Best Dance/Electronic Album for the former. He made his scoring debut in 2026 with the film The Moment.

== Early life ==
Alexander Guy Cook is the son of English architect Sir Peter Cook and Israeli architect Yael Reisner. Cook was privately educated; he attended the King Alfred School in Hampstead, where he met future collaborator Danny L Harle. He then attended Goldsmiths, University of London, where he studied music, and reconnected with Harle. The two bonded over their shared musical tastes for artists including Captain Beefheart and Archie Shepp, as well as interest in comedy duo Tim & Eric. This grew into a musical project called Dux Content.

== Career ==
=== 2011–2013: Career beginnings ===
Since they did not have a vocalist, Dux Content focused on musical experiments like compound metres and changes in tempo. One of their earlier works was a collection of compositions for the Disklavier, released with Spencer Noble and Tim Phillips under the name "Dux Consort". The pair released their songs with renderings of digital avatars for promotional artwork.

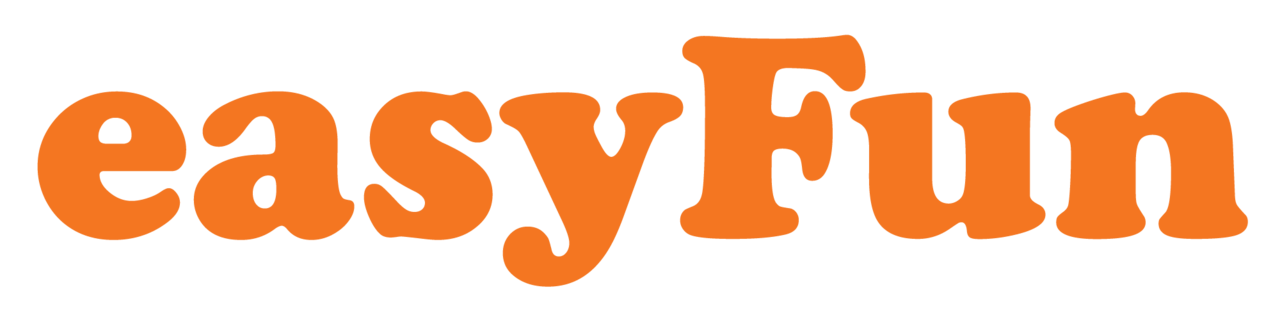
Cook has worked on graphics for PC Music acts including Finn Keane (formerly Easyfun) and Maxo.

Cook created Gamsonite, a "pseudo-label" collecting his early collaborations. Dux Content released its songs with renderings of digital avatars for promotional artwork. They contributed to the score for Alicia Norman's animated film Heart of Death and began considering a children's television show titled Dux Content's Jungle Jam. Cook and Harle explored how to build rhythms out of a vocalist's natural singing tempo and released the results as "Dux Kidz". The project was noticed by producer Sophie, who later worked with PC Music's acts. Cook began working on building flashy websites with Hannah Diamond and decided to focus on using websites to promote music.

=== 2013–2016: Foundation of PC Music ===
In August 2013, Cook founded PC Music as a way of embracing an A&R role, with the aim of "recording people who don't normally make music and treating them as if they're a major label artist." In January 2014, Cook released "Keri Baby" as his first solo single, with vocals by Diamond. The track uses pop clichés and glitchy vocals to depict Diamond as a digital entity on a screen. His follow-up single "Beautiful" was released in June. "Beautiful" is a pastiche of Eurodance, featuring high, pitch-shifted vocals and donk sounds. Fact magazine called it PC Music's "de-facto anthem", and the song received a remix from Scottish producer Rustie.

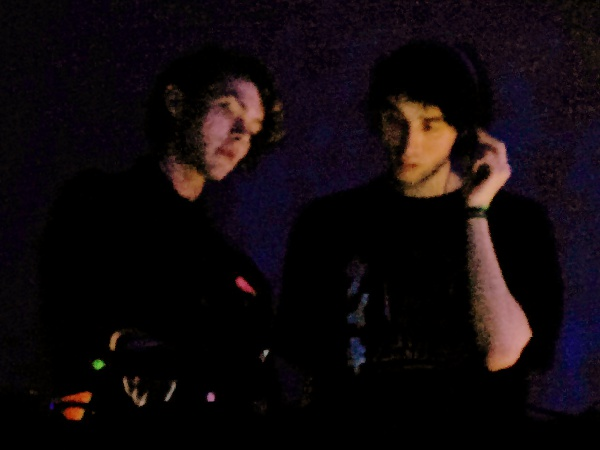
Sophie (left) and Cook (right) produced QT's single "Hey QT"

Cook worked with Sophie to produce a song for QT, a pop singer portrayed by American performance artist Hayden Dunham. She found Cook through his work online and wanted to use a song to market a QT energy drink. Their resulting collaboration "Hey QT" was released in August 2014 on XL Recordings.

On 22 December 2014, A. G. Cook released "What I Mean" from his "Personal Computer Music" mix as a single. The single was made available as a free download via radio presenter Annie Mac's "Free Music Monday" SoundCloud channel. Opening with muffled dialogue, the song incorporates robotic vocals and a sample of R&B artist Chuckii Booker. Its organ-based arrangement was a more soulful take on Cook's usual style of dance-pop. After discussing a collaboration on a Charli XCX album, Cook contributed an official remix of her single "Doing It" featuring Rita Ora.

Cook's work received recognition on year-end lists for 2014. "Keri Baby" was listed at number 5 of Dummy magazine's "20 Best Tracks of 2014", and BuzzFeed's "13 Obscure Tracks of 2014", number 1 on Gorilla vs. Bear's, "Favourite Tracks of 2014", number 2 on Dazed & Confused's "Top 20 Tracks of 2014". Pitchfork ranked "Beautiful" number 30 on its list of "The 100 Best Tracks of 2014".

March 2015 saw Cook's PC Music head to the US to showcase all 11 of his label's talent at the Empire Garage in Austin, Texas as part of SXSW. The showcase received positive reviews, with The Guardian stating that his "entire thundering set [shows] this is a label refusing to be confined by definitions of genre or good taste." On 8 May 2015, Cook performed as part of a PC Music show at BRIC House in Brooklyn, New York as part of the Red Bull Music Academy Festival. The show was billed as the premiere of Pop Cube, "a multimedia reality network".

In January 2016, Chinese singer Li Yuchun, also known as Chris Lee, released a single consisting of songs "Real Love" and "Only You", both of which were produced by Cook. That April, experimental music producer Oneohtrix Point Never posted a cryptic video to his Instagram that appeared to show Cook working on a remix of "Sticky Drama", a single from his 2015 album Garden of Delete. The remix was later surprise-released on 16 December. Also in April, Cook made a cameo in Charli XCX's music video for "Vroom Vroom". "Superstar", Cook's fifth single, was released via PC Music on 13 July. On the day of its release, Cook revealed via Twitter that "Superstar" had been in the works for over two years prior, originally beginning as a "topline pitch" for electro house DJ Zedd.

=== 2017–2020: Charli XCX, Jónsi, 7G and Apple ===
In March 2017, Charli XCX's mixtape Number 1 Angel was released, prominently featuring production by Cook and others, including PC Music artists and affiliates Sophie, Danny L Harle, Life Sim and Finn Keane, who created the project EasyFX with Cook. This was followed by the mixtape Pop 2, also featuring production by Cook and others. Pitchfork Media gave Pop 2 a rating of 8.4 out of 10, calling it "a vision of what pop music could be" and "the best full-length work of both Charli and PC Music's respective careers". In July he covered Aphex Twin’s 1999 single "Windowlicker" for his set at Field Day which directly clashed with Aphex Twin's headline show at the festival, spending an "intense 48 hours inside a windowless room" to do so.

Cook released a remix of Phoenix's song "Fior Di Latte" in February 2018. In May, he released a 57-minute mix titled Hollywood Ambient, remixing tracks by artists including Rihanna, Sigur Rós, Charli XCX, and Katy Perry, for Sigur Rós' “Liminal” ambient playlist. It also remixed Grimes' song "Flesh Without Blood"; Cook called it "Flesh Without Musk" in reference to her then partner Elon Musk. Cook produced the Charli XCX single track Focus with Jack & Coke in June. In November, he contributed to Tommy Cash's second studio album ¥€$. He is credited as the producer on 5 tracks on the record, including lead single "X-RAY" which he co-produced with Danny L Harle.

Cook was announced as the co-executive producer for Charli XCX's third studio album Charli, which was released on 13 September 2019. Cook produced six of the album's seven singles, including "Gone", the third single from the album, which features Christine and the Queens. The song was awarded "Best New Track" by Pitchfork and best song of the week by Stereogum. In October, 100 Gecs released Cook's remix of their single "Money Machine" to announce their remix album 1000 Gecs and the Tree of Clues. The Fader called the remix "a disorienting exercise in maximalism and rapid tonal shifts."

On 6 April 2020, Cook and BJ Burton were announced as co-executive producers for Charli XCX's quarantine album how i'm feeling now, which was written in an open-source style, sharing the production process online and utilizing fan input and content. Cook also produced Jónsi's first solo music in a decade, the song "Exhale", released on 23 April, and followed this by serving as executive producer on Jónsi's album Shiver, released on 2 October.

On 30 July 2020, Cook announced an upcoming studio album 7G, and held a virtual concert over Zoom featuring Caroline Polachek, GRRL and Thy Slaughter titled 7 by 7 on 7 August. Thy Slaughter is a collaboration project between Cook and labelmate Finn Keane. 7G was released through PC Music on 12 August, comprising 49 tracks split over seven discs.

On 20 August 2020, Cook released the single "Oh Yeah" and announced another studio album, Apple. Leading up to its release, Cook hosted another free livestream festival across Zoom, Bandcamp and Twitch entitled 'Appleville', featuring performers including 100 gecs, Alaska Reid, Charli XCX, Clairo, Dorian Electra, Hannah Diamond, Kero Kero Bonito, Namasenda and Oklou. All proceeds from VIP ticket sales were donated to Mermaids and Black Cultural Archives. The album was released through PC Music on 18 September 2020.

After 5 years of collaborating with Charli XCX, in November 2020 the pair was awarded the Variety Hitmakers Innovator of The Year Award. In December 2020, Cook took part in LuckyMe Records' 12 Alternative Futures Advent Calendar Project. Cook's remix of Baauer's song "Planet's Mad" was released on 10 December.

=== 2021–2022: Hikaru Utada, Apple vs. 7G, Lady Gaga and Beyoncé ===
Cook collaborated with Japanese American singer-songwriter Hikaru Utada in March 2021, co-producing the song "One Last Kiss", the theme song for the Japanese animated science fiction film Evangelion: 3.0+1.0 Thrice Upon a Time. On 9 March, he released a cover of The Smashing Pumpkins' song "Today", announcing his SoundCloud-exclusive album Dream Logic, featuring reworks of 7G and Apple tracks as well as collaborations with and remixes of Charli XCX, Oneohtrix Point Never, The 1975, Jónsi, No Rome, Oklou, Alex Somers, and Alaska Reid. This was released on 12 March. In April, Cook penned a tribute to Sophie who had died earlier that year.

Cook later announced that further remixes from his would be included on a 21-track joint remix album titled Apple vs. 7G. The album was released on 28 May and features remixes from Keane and Hannah Diamond as well as Polachek, Charli XCX and No Rome. Cook released the remixed version of No Rome's "Spinning", featuring Charli XCX and the 1975, in May 2021. In June, Cook hosted and curated his first show in a 4 part residency on BBC Radio 6 music as part of the 'Lose Yourself with...' series. He contributed to Lady Gaga's Dawn of Chromatica remix album, released in September 2021, providing a remix for the track "911" alongside Charli XCX. That October, Cook partnered with Apple Inc. to release "Start Up", a song that incorporates sounds from Apple products from the past 45 years. It was used as the intro music for an Apple media event that month.

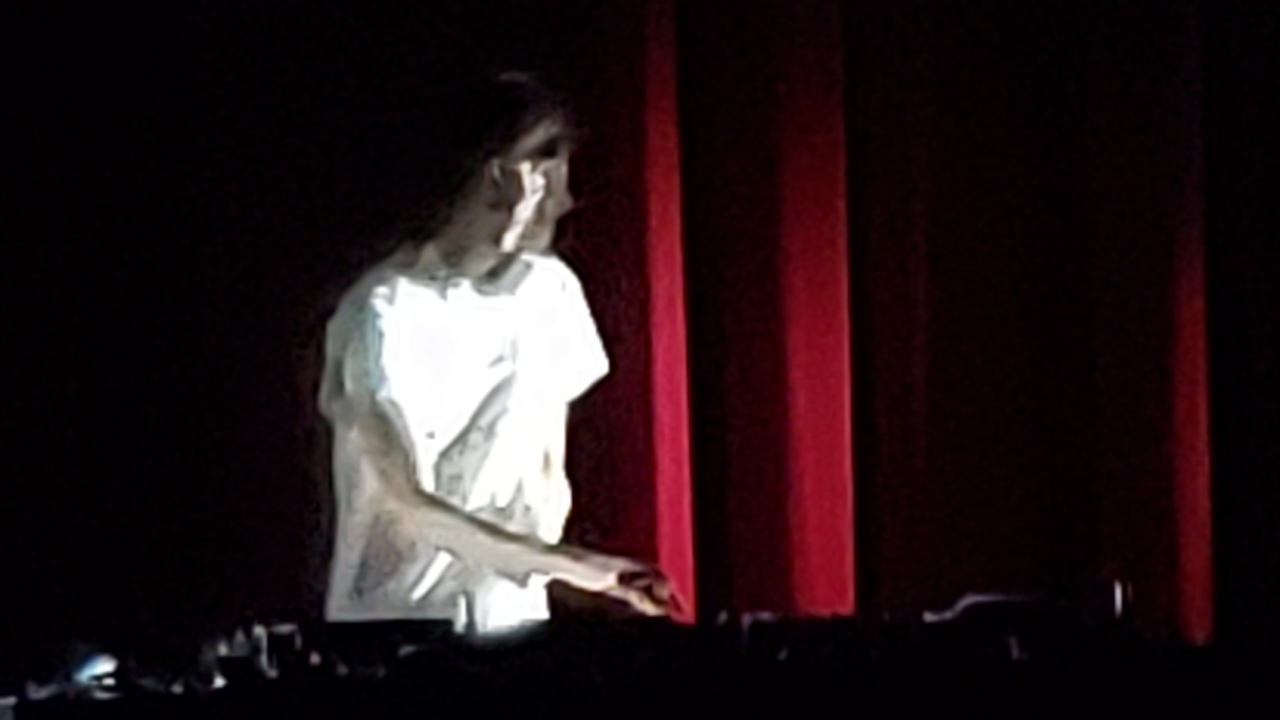
Cook performing in 2022

Cook co-produced another song with Utada in 2022, called "Kimi ni Muchū", and remixed Utada's song "Face My Fears" for her album Bad Mode. In 2022, he co-wrote and co-produced the song "All Up in Your Mind" with Beyoncé, which was included on her seventh studio album Renaissance. It earned his first Grammy Award nomination for Album of the Year.

=== 2023–present: Closure of PC Music, Thy Slaughter, Britpop and Brat ===
Cook lent additional production to "Lick the light out", featuring Madonna, on Christine and the Queens' Paranoïa, Angels, True Love. Cook also produced the majority of Alaska Reid's album Disenchanter, which released in July 2023. He worked again with Utada, in a new song called "Gold -Mata Au Hi Made- (Gold – Till the day we see each other again)", the theme song of the movie KINGDOM: The Flame of Destiny, released July 28. Cook also contributed to the score of 2023 film Bottoms, and produced "How to Stay With You" from Troye Sivan's Something to Give Each Other album.

In July 2023, Cook announced that PC Music would cease to release any further new material after the end of 2023. In August, the label released the album Another Pobbles Christmas under the name Pobbles, a project which largely involved Cook with visual art by George Michael Brower. Some of the label's final releases include Felicita's Spalarkle, Hannah Diamond's Perfect Picture, and Thy Slaughter's debut album Soft Rock which included features from Charli XCX, Alaska Reid, Caroline Polachek, and Ellie Rowsell.

On January 1, 2024, Cook released the single "Silver Thread Golden Needle", his first release following the dissolution of PC Music. He announced his next album Britpop on 23 February with the release of its title track featuring vocals by Charli XCX. He released the Britpop single "Soulbreaker" on 17 April. Britpop was released on 10 May 2024 under Cook's newly set up record label New Alias, consisting of 24 songs which were split into three discs representing the past, present and future respectively.

Cook was a significant producer on the Charli XCX album Brat, working on singles "Von Dutch", "Club Classics", and "B2B". He further produced "Hello Goodbye" and "Spring Breakers" on the deluxe version, Brat and It’s the Same but There’s Three More Songs So It’s Not, sampling Britney Spears' "Everytime" in the production of the latter. Charli XCX followed the album with several remixes, including a remix of "Von Dutch" by Cook which featured Addison Rae. This remix was praised by The Line of Best Fit, which called Cook's production "idiosyncratic". His "Von Dutch" remix was then nominated for the Grammy Award for Best Remixed Recording, while his production credits on Brat earned him his first Grammy Award win for Best Dance/Electronic Album.

In May 2024, Utada released a re-recorded version of "Simple and Clean" with Cook credited as a producer. He co-produced Kesha's "Joyride" for her album Period, and was also a co-producer on F5ve's Sequence 01 single "UFO" and "Magic Clock" which released on October 17, 2024 and March 5, 2025. He additionally co-produced F5ve's song, Snowman, part of Sequence 01.5 (Dreaming of the 2nd 1st Impact - Consequences of Fate Redux)

Cook produced the October 2026 DIIV album Zirp!. He contributed to the score of Grand Theft Auto VI, producing the song "Power Trip" by Jennie.

== Artistry ==
"Beautiful" (2014)
"Beautiful" is an extreme, high-pitched take on pop music. Its repeated hook touches on the concept of eternity, a common motif in PC Music's songs.

Cook's style of music amplifies the clichés of mainstream pop music from the 1990s and 2000s. He follows the work of "mega-producers" such as Max Martin and Jimmy Jam and Terry Lewis. Cook references Scritti Politti's album Cupid & Psyche 85 for its "conscious decision to take pop music and make it as shiny and detailed as possible". He cites Korean and Japanese pop music as influences, as well as gyaru subculture.

Cook begins constructing tracks by constructing chords and melodies note by note. He prefers the sounds of virtual instruments and avoids sound design early in the process, giving his music a deadpan simplicity. He experiments with combining dissonant sounds, and the resulting dense, multi-layered arrangements are influenced by the Black MIDI techniques. Cook's arrangements are inspired by the mechanized music of composer Conlon Nancarrow. When collaborating with other artists, he prepares an extensive demo so that they can complete lyrics and record vocals straight away. Cook thoroughly processes the vocals, chopping them to use as a rhythmic element atop the melody.

In contrast to most of the artists on PC Music, Cook wears plain clothing. GFOTY jokingly characterised his style as normcore.

== PC Music ==
PC Music is (Note: Since 2024, the label is now only dedicated to archival projects and special reissues.) a record label founded by A. G. Cook in 2013. Its first song was made available on SoundCloud the same year. PC Music is known for its surreal or exaggerated take on pop music, often featuring pitch-shifted, feminine vocals and bright, synthetic textures. Artists on its roster include Hannah Diamond, Finn Keane, Namasenda and Danny L Harle. The label has been characterized as embracing the aesthetics of advertising, consumerism and corporate branding. Its artists often present devised personas inspired by cyberculture. The label has inspired both praise and criticism from journalists and has been called "polarizing". In 2019 it was described by Dazed as one of the 'most exhilarating record labels of the 2010s.' In more recent years it has been noted for its influence on mainstream pop due to the production work by PC Music signees for artists such as Kim Petras, Charli XCX and Jónsi.

== Personal life ==
Cook moved to Los Angeles in 2019. He is in a relationship with fellow musician and collaborator Alaska Reid.

== Discography ==
- 7G (2020)
- Apple (2020)
- Britpop (2024)

== Filmography ==
=== Film ===
Year	Film	Role	Director(s)	Notes
2022	Charli XCX: Alone Together	Himself	Bradley & Pablo	Documentary film
2026	The Moment	Himself	Aidan Zamiri	Also composer

=== Music videos ===
Year	Song	Artist(s)	Role	Director(s)	Notes
2016	"VIPOTY"	GFOTY	Sneaky Picture Taker	Roland Waters	Companion short film for the EP of the same name
2016	"Vroom Vroom"	Charli XCX	Himself	Bradley&Pablo	
2016	"After the Afterparty"	Charli XCX	Zombie	Diane Martel	
2017	"Month of Mayhem"	GFOTY	Himself	Mr. E	
2017	"Boys"	Charli XCX	Himself	Charli XCX and Sarah McColgan	
2018	"X-Ray"	Tommy Cash	Himself	Tommy Cash and Anna-Lisa Himma	
2020	"Party"	Planet 1999	Himself	Aidan Zamiri and Eamonn Freel	
2020	"Oh Yeah"	A. G. Cook	Himself	A. G. Cook	
2020	"Silver"	A. G. Cook	Himself	A. G. Cook and Aaron Chan	
2020	"Xxoplex"	A. G. Cook	n/a	Timothy Luke	As lead artist only
2020	"Today (Live at Appleville)"	A. G. Cook	Apple	Rick Farin & Claire Cochran	
2020	"Beautiful Superstar"	A. G. Cook	Himself	Prosper Unger-Hamilton and A. G. Cook	
2020	"Boys From Town"	Alaska Reid	Himself	Santiago Cendejas, A. G. Cook and Alaska Reid	
2020	"Jumper"	A. G. Cook	Himself	A. G. Cook and Aaron Chan	
2020	"Big Bunny"	Alaska Reid	n/a	A. G. Cook	As director only
2020	"Warm"	Alaska Reid	n/a	A. G. Cook	As director only
2021	"Xcxoplex"	A. G. Cook & Charli XCX	n/a	Actual Objects	As lead artist only
2021	"Idyll"	A. G. Cook	n/a	Daniel Swan	As lead artist only
2021	"Show Me What"	A. G. Cook & Cecile Believe	n/a	Prosper Unger-Hamilton	As lead artist only
2022	"Every Rule"	Charli XCX	Himself	Imogene Strauss and Luke Orlando	
2023	"Back to This"	Alaska Reid	Himself	Santiago Cendejas	
2024	"Silver Thread Golden Needle"	A. G. Cook	n/a	Lena Weber & Aaron Chan	As lead artist only
2024	"Britpop"	A. G. Cook	n/a	Timothy Luke	As lead artist only
2024	"Soulbreaker"	A. G. Cook	n/a	Gustaf Holtenäs	As lead artist only
2024	"Heartache"	A. G. Cook	n/a	Jacob Hulmston	As lead artist only
2024	"360"	Charli XCX	Himself	Aidan Zamiri	
2025	"Lucifer"	A. G. Cook	n/a	Steve Smith	As lead artist only
2026	"Residue"	A. G. Cook	n/a	Aidan Zamiri	As lead artist only

== Awards and nominations ==
Award ceremony	Year	Work	Category	Result	Ref.
Grammy Awards	2023	Renaissance	Album of the Year	Nominated	
Grammy Awards	2025	Brat	Album of the Year	Nominated	
Grammy Awards	2025	Brat	Best Dance/Electronic Album	Won	
Grammy Awards	2025	"360"	Record of the Year	Nominated	
Grammy Awards	2025	"Von Dutch A. G. Cook Remix"	Best Remixed Recording	Nominated	
