= Blu DeTiger =

American musician (born 1998)

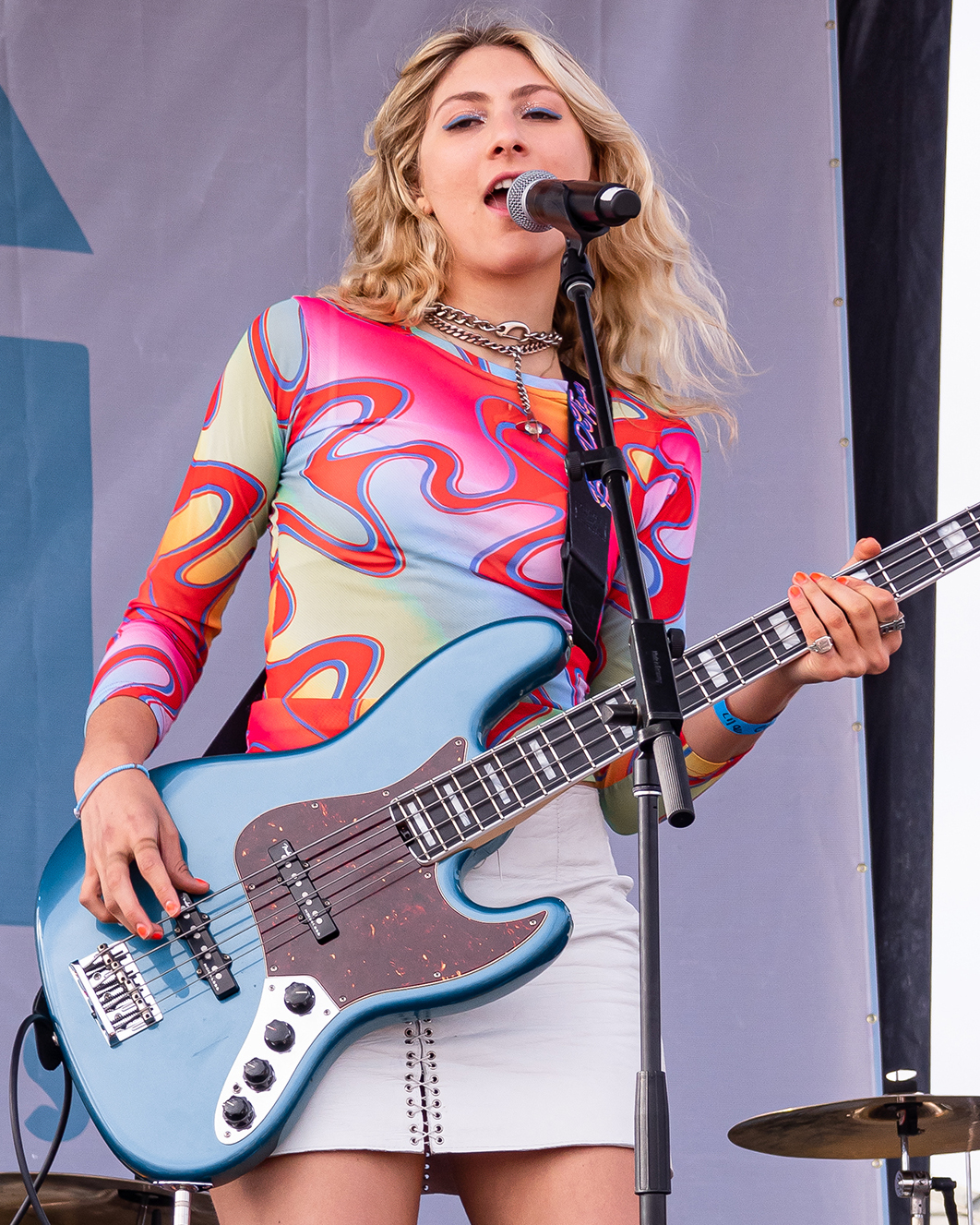
- DeTiger performing at Hermosa Beach in 2019

Background information
- Born: February 22, 1998 (age 28); New York City, U.S.
- Genre: Indie pop
- Occupations: Musician; singer; songwriter
- Instruments: Vocals; bass guitar; guitar
- Years active: 2016–present
- Labels: ALT:VISION; HeavyRoc Music; Capitol
- Website: Official website

TikTok information
- Page: bludetiger
- Followers: 1.4 million
- Last updated: October 11, 2026

Blu DeTiger (born February 22, 1998) is an American singer and bass guitarist from New York City. She has released one EP, How Did We Get Here? (2021) and one studio album, All I Ever Want Is Everything (2024).

== Early life ==
DeTiger was born in New York City to Jonny DeTiger, a Dutch visual artist, and was raised in NoHo, Manhattan. Her older brother Rex suggested the name Blu when she was born, and her parents agreed. She started playing bass guitar at the age of seven, inspired by Rex, who played drums, and she was enrolled in School of Rock until the age of 13. Through that program, she played at CBGB at the age of seven. Until she was 14 years old, her family spent summers in Ibiza, which exposed her to DJs and house music. She was also influenced by funk and disco music, and in her early teens, she learned slapping. Throughout middle school and high school at the Dalton School, DeTiger played in bands with students who were usually older than her.

DeTiger attended New York University Tisch School of the Arts for two and a half years, including a year at the Clive Davis Institute of Recorded Music, before withdrawing to tour and promote her music. She was mentored by Steven Wolf. As a student, she occasionally acted as a Manhattan club DJ, playing disco, house and funk and simultaneously improvising bass lines over the music.

== Career ==
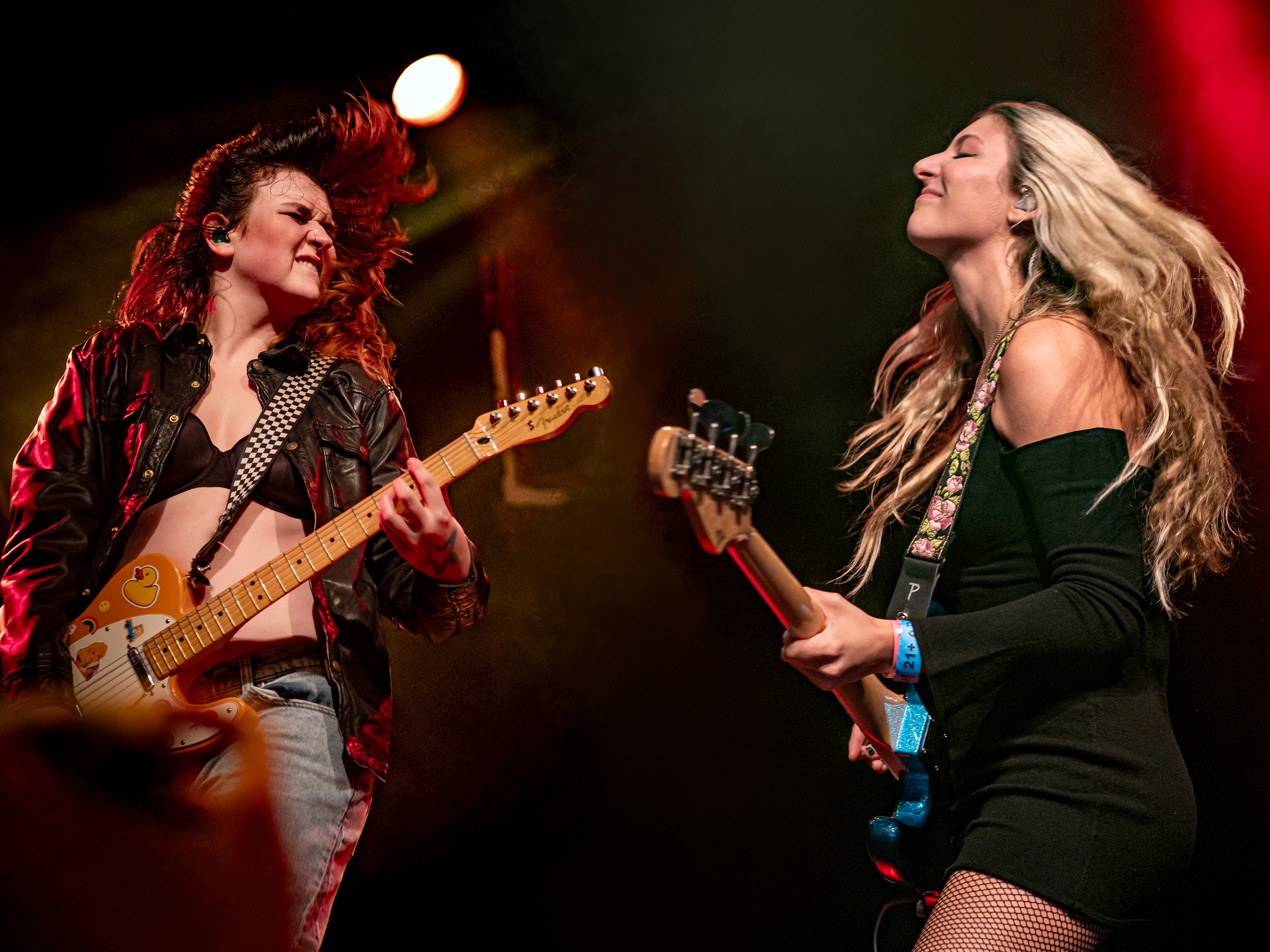
DeTiger performing with Gayle in 2023

Along with her brother, in 2018, DeTiger was a touring member of Kitten on their tour with Blue October.

DeTiger released her debut single "In My Head" on January 23, 2019. It was produced by the Knocks, and she subsequently toured with them. In 2019 and early 2020, DeTiger toured as a bassist with Caroline Polachek and FLETCHER. During the COVID-19 lockdowns, she posted her bass cover versions of songs by Prince, Janet Jackson, Russ and Megan Thee Stallion on TikTok, which became viral videos.

Her debut EP How Did We Get Here? was released on March 5, 2021 on ALT:Vision, with production help from her brother. She contributed bass to the Bleachers' single "Stop Making This Hurt", released in May 2021.

She was featured on one of four covers of the August 2021 issue of Bass Player, which described her as the "future of bass". That month, her song "Go Bad" was released on the soundtrack for the Netflix film He's All That. In September 2021, Fender collaborated with DeTiger to launch a new line of bass guitars for the Fender Player Plus series and named her an official Fender Next Player. The following month, DeTiger signed with Capitol Records, and released a new song, "Blondes".

On January 15, 2022, DeTiger made her national TV debut on Saturday Night Live, accompanying Bleachers on bass. She was featured in the 2022 film Olivia Rodrigo: Driving Home 2 U. In the summer of 2022, DeTiger headlined a European tour and performed at festivals such as Bonnaroo, Electric Forest, Lightning in a Bottle, Hangout and the Governors Ball. She toured North America in November 2022. DeTiger was listed in the music category for the 2023 edition of the Forbes 30 Under 30. Her first studio album, All I Ever Want Is Everything, was released in March 2024. Chappell Roan cowrote the song "Hey You" on the album, which also includes collaborations with Uffie, Mallrat, Mayer Hawthorne and Alexander 23. DeTiger toured for the album in 2024 and played several festivals, including Lollapalooza.

On September 10, 2024, DeTiger announced that Fender would produce her signature Player Plus Jazz Bass.

DeTiger has opened for artists such as Sabrina Carpenter, Charlie Puth, ODESZA, SOFI TUKKER, Bleachers, Chromeo and Jungle.

== Awards ==
DeTiger received the Future of Bass Award in a ceremony hosted by Bass Magazine on January 22, 2026 alongside Laura Lee of Khruangbin.

== Discography ==
=== Studio albums ===
Title	Album details
All I Ever Want Is Everything	Released: March 29, 2024; Label: Capitol Records; Formats: LP, digital download
N.Y. Baby	Released: November 6, 2026; Label: Self-released; Formats: Digital download

=== Extended plays ===
Title	Album details
How Did We Get Here?	Released: March 5, 2021; Label: ALT:Vision; Formats: Digital download

=== Singles ===
Title	Year	Album
"In My Head"	2019	non-album singles
"Mad Love"	2019	non-album singles
"Tangerine"	2019	non-album singles
"Figure It Out"	2020	How Did We Get Here?
"Cotton Candy Lemonade"	2020	How Did We Get Here?
"Vintage"	2021	How Did We Get Here?
"Blondes"	2021	non-album single
"Hot Crush Lover"	2022	non-album single
"Crash Course" (with Biig Piig)	2022	non-album single
"Elevator"	2022	non-album single
"Cut Me Down" (with Mallrat)	2023	All I Ever Want Is Everything
"Dangerous Game"	2024	All I Ever Want Is Everything
"Kiss"	2024	All I Ever Want Is Everything
"Murder on the Dancefloor"	2024	non-album single
"High Like Heaven" (with Adore)	2025	non-album single
"Whisper"	2026	N.Y. Baby
"Shock!"	2026	N.Y. Baby
"Feel Good"	2026	N.Y. Baby
"N.Y. Baby" (featuring Flavor Flav, Holly Walker, and Say She She)	2026	N.Y. Baby

== Filmography ==
Year	Title	Role	Notes
2019	I'm with the Band: Nasty Cherry	Herself	4 episodes
2022	Olivia Rodrigo: Driving Home 2 U	Herself	
2026	One Night Only	Herself	
