= Hayden Dunham =

American performance artist (born 1988)

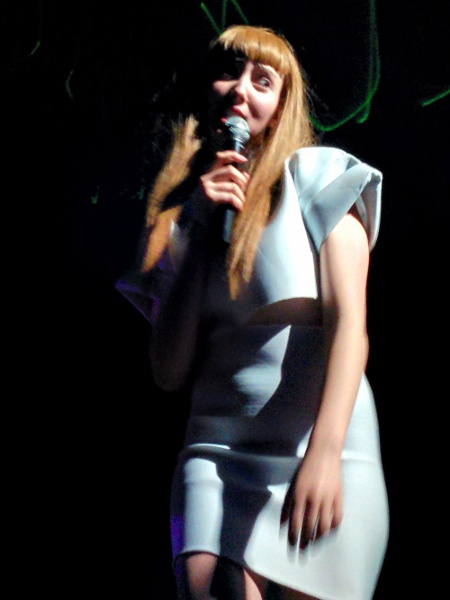
- Dunham performing as QT in March 2015

Background information
- Also known as: QT; Hyd
- Born: 16 June 1988 (age 38); Austin, Texas
- Origin: New York, U.S.
- Genres: Electronic; pop; dance-pop; art pop
- Occupations: Performance artist; designer; singer; songwriter; DJ
- Years active: 2014–present
- Labels: PC Music; XL

Hayden Frances Dunham (born June 16, 1988) is an American performance artist, designer, singer, songwriter and DJ. They grew up in Austin, Texas and attended the Gallatin School of Individualized Study at NYU.

They are best known for their work as QT (an initialism for Quinn Thomas) a music project founded in 2014, in collaboration with English producers A. G. Cook and Sophie. QT is a pop singer, portrayed by Dunham and sung by Harriet Pittard, who promotes and is the living embodiment of the semi-fictitious DrinkQT energy drink. They released the single "Hey QT" in 2014.

Dunham began operating under the pseudonym Hyd (/hīd/) in 2020, releasing their debut single "No Shadow" in September 2021. A four-track EP was released November 5. Hyd's debut album Clearing was released on November 11, 2022, via PC Music. Their second album Hold Onto Me Infinity was released on May 22, 2026.

== Career ==
=== 2014–2016: QT ===
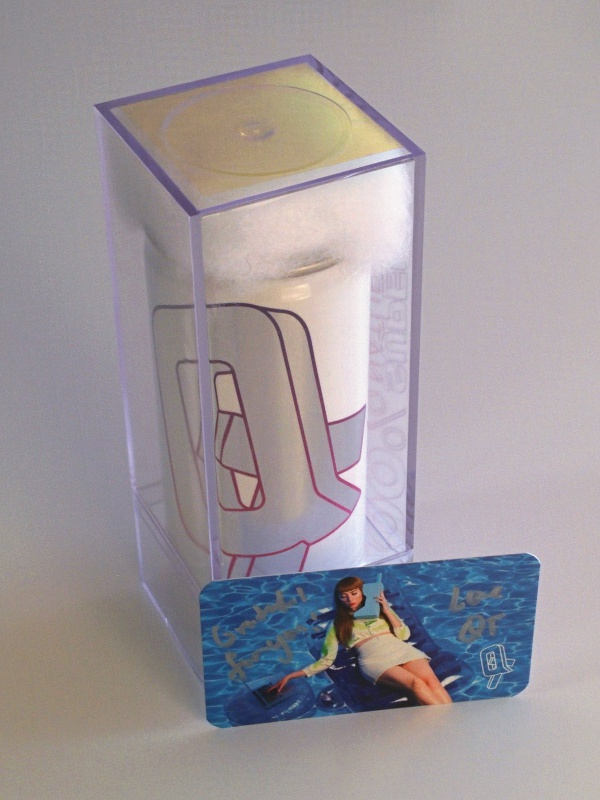
A package with the DrinkQT energy drink

Before the QT project, Dunham had done work as a designer and artist. They met English producer Sophie after the two had seen each other at various events. They found A. G. Cook, head of the PC Music record label, through his work online. Dunham originally wanted to do a song as a way to market a QT energy drink, and asked the producers to repeat the name regularly.

QT is, in effect, a virtual character. The concept drew comparisons to the 2002 science fiction film S1M0NE and the virtual Japanese pop star Hatsune Miku. The project includes DrinkQT, an "energy elixir" with a design by Kim Laughton. The music and drink are intended to be two manifestations of the same product. Both have been described as "fizzy" and "energetic", with Dunham stating that they wanted "to be able to talk about 'Hey QT' and have DrinkQT talk about 'Hey QT' and 'Hey QT' talk about DrinkQT." The drink was distributed at performances, and in May 2015 DrinkQT was made available for pre-order. Journalist Sasha Geffen described it as tasting "like Red Bull, only a little more tart." Distributing the drink was a source of friction with the Red Bull Music Academy's sponsorship of a PC Music show.

=== 2017–2019: Art and musical hiatus ===
The QT project would take various forms after 2016, such as an official short film and DJ sets, but lay mostly dormant. Dunham took a musical hiatus and worked on multiple art exhibitions and projects in this time, notably a performance piece at MoMa titled 7 Sisters in early 2019.

=== 2020–present: Hyd ===
August 2020 marked a return to music, as Dunham appeared on A. G. Cook's debut album 7G, under the pseudonym Hyd, featuring again on his second album Apple only a month after. Cook teased Hyd solo material throughout the promotion cycles of the two albums.

In September 2021, Hyd's debut single "No Shadow" was released via Cook's PC Music label. It was written after a temporary period of Dunham losing their eyesight in 2017. "Skin 2 Skin", co-produced by Cook, American singer Caroline Polachek, and English producer SOPHIE, was also released as a single. A 4-track self-titled EP was released on November 5, 2021, and they performed a number of live shows, including one at a PC Music event at Pitchfork Music Festival London. Hyd released a cover of Nick Cave and the Bad Seeds' "Into My Arms" in January 2022, produced by Easyfun.

Dunham released the Polachek-produced single "Afar" in July 2022. On September 8, 2022, they released the single "So Clear", featuring posthumous production from Sophie and Easyfun, and announced their debut album Clearing.

In March 2026, their second studio album Hold Onto Me Infinity was announced for release on May 22. It was preceded by the single releases of Hudson Mohawke-produced "Angel", as well as "Watch You Cry".

== Discography ==
=== Studio albums ===
Studio album with selected details
Title	Album details
Clearing	Released: November 11, 2022; Label: PC Music; Formats: CD, LP, digital download, streaming
Hold Onto Me Infinity	Released: May 22, 2026; Label: Cascine; Formats: LP, digital download, streaming

=== Extended play ===
Extended play with selected details
Title	Details
Hyd	Released: September 9, 2021; Label: PC Music; Formats: CD, LP, digital download, streaming

=== Singles ===
List of singles
Title	Year	Album
"Hey QT" (as QT)	2014	Non-album single
"No Shadow"	2021	Hyd
"Skin 2 Skin"	2021	Hyd
"The Look on Your Face"	2021	Hyd
"Into My Arms"	2022	Non-album single
"Afar"	2022	Clearing
"So Clear"	2022	Clearing
"Breaking Ground"	2022	Clearing
"Fallen Angel"	2022	Clearing
"Angel"	2026	Hold Onto Me Infinity
"Watch You Cry"	2026	Hold Onto Me Infinity
"Freak"	2026	Hold Onto Me Infinity
