= 7G (album) =

Studio album by A. G. Cook
- Released: 12 August 2020
- Genre: Experimental electronic; drill 'n' bass; IDM; pop; hyperpop
- Length: 159:21
- Label: PC Music
- Producer: A. G. Cook

A. G. Cook chronology
Nu Jack Swung (2013)	7G (2020)	Apple (2020)

Professional ratings
Aggregate scores
Source	Rating
Metacritic	74/100
Review scores
Source	Rating
The Line of Best Fit	7/10
Our Culture Mag	3.5/5 stars
Pitchfork	7.3/10

7G is the debut studio album by English music producer, singer and PC Music label head A. G. Cook. It was released through PC Music on 12 August 2020.

The album is 49 tracks long and split into seven discs, each disc being instrument-specific. 7G was not supported by any singles, but a seven-minute long mix previewing one song from each disc for approximately one minute each. In addition to new material, it includes covers of songs by Taylor Swift, Blur, Charli XCX, The Strokes, The Smashing Pumpkins, and more.

Primarily an experimental electronic, pop, and hyperpop album, 7G features elements of many genres including trance, techno, country, metal, grunge rock, punk, IDM, 2-step, drill 'n' bass, and progressive electronic.

Cook released his second studio album Apple on 18 September 2020, only five weeks later. Apple vs. 7G, a remix album consisting of songs from both Apple and 7G, was released on 28 May 2021.

== Background and recording ==
Cook first began teasing 7G's release in September 2018 via Instagram. In March 2020, Cook took to Instagram again to give an update on his record.

In May 2020, Cook performed as part of American songwriter and producer Porter Robinson's virtual musical festival Secret Sky, where he debuted new material.

Of the background and recording of 7G, and its successor, Apple, Cook spoke with The Recording Academy in September 2020, stating:

I actually finished the Apple album about a year ago. And I was just looking for the right way to contextualize it. And then with the 7G stuff, some of it was done kind of recently, but it's really an exploration of all the sounds that went into Apple. It's a time travel look at things I've been exploring since day one, since seven years ago when I was starting to do this full-time. Obviously I'm fairly prolific and work with different people. But also I just thought it was the most true version of me to be quite saturated and seeing things from many different angles at the same time. That just felt like the right way to do a debut.

== Release and promotion ==
Cook announced the 7-disc record on 31 July 2020, along with its cover art, designed by Supermodel, release date, and track list that featured 49 tracks. Instead of a lead single, Cook released a seven-minute mix, previewing one-minute snippets of "Acid Angel", "Gold Leaf", "Illuminated Biker Gang", "Anything Could Happen", "Behind Glass", "Hold On" and "Show Me What".

A digital preorder on Bandcamp was also made available, whereupon purchase buyers were gifted with a Deluxe Box Set, including "a definitive source of 7G information & artwork, a labyrinth of images, text, sound & MIDI and a 30-minute audio file", as well as the aforementioned seven-minute mix.

On 6 August, a 7G live event, titled 7 by 7, was hosted on Zoom. The live event featured sets from GRRL, Thy Slaughter (Cook and easyFun), Cook, No Rome, Baseck, Hayden Dunham & Alex Somers and Cecile Believe & Caroline Polachek. The event was later uploaded to PC Music's official YouTube channel.

On 11 August, a 7G listening was broadcast on Zoom, followed by an afterparty live event, featuring sets from Balming Tiger, Charli XCX, DJ Warlord, Hannah Diamond, Flume, Namasenda and SOPHIE.

On 7G's release day, Cook released a visual for the final track on the album, "Alright", directed by Aaron Chan.

On 26 August, Cook released the video to the final track on disc 1, "Silver", directed by Cook himself and Aaron Chan.

On 14 September, Cook released the video to the "Live at Appleville" version of the first track on the final disc, "Today", directed by Rick Farin & Claire Cochran. The video was premiered at the virtual live event Cook hosted via Twitch, Appleville, the day prior.

A physical CD boxset was announced for release in October 2021.

== Track listing ==
All tracks written and produced by A. G. Cook, except where noted.

Disc one – A. G. Drums
No.	Title	Length
1.	"A-Z"	4:16
2.	"Acid Angel"	3:45
3.	"H2O"	3:00
4.	"Drum Solo"	0:46
5.	"Nu Crush"	3:18
6.	"Gemstone Break"	3:45
7.	"Silver"	2:03
Total length:		20:53

Disc two – A. G. Guitar
No.	Title	Length
1.	"Gold Leaf"	2:57
2.	"Being Harsh"	3:09
3.	"Undying"	3:03
4.	"Drink Blood"	3:01
5.	"Lil Song" (written by Cook and Daniel Lopatin)	1:48
6.	"Beetlebum" (written by Damon Albarn, Graham Coxon, Alex James and Dave Rowntree)	2:44
7.	"Superstar" (live at Secret Sky)	4:09
Total length:		20:51

Disc three – A. G. Supersaw
No.	Title	Length
1.	"Mad Max"	2:57
2.	"Illuminated Biker Gang"	4:27
3.	"Soft Landing"	4:40
4.	"Overheim"	2:47
5.	"DJ Every Night" (written by Cook and Hannah Diamond)	4:35
6.	"Car Keys"	5:36
7.	"Dust"	4:58
Total length:		30:00

Disc four – A. G. Piano
No.	Title	Producer(s)	Length
1.	"Oracle"		3:04
2.	"Note Velocity"		4:59
3.	"Windows"		4:40
4.	"Feeling"		3:48
5.	"Waldhammer"		0:56
6.	"Polyphloisboisterous"	Cook; Baseck^{[a]}	2:06
7.	"Anything Could Happen"		1:47
Total length:			21:20

Disc five – A. G. Nord
No.	Title	Length
1.	"Behind Glass"	3:23
2.	"Oohu"	4:09
3.	"The Best Day" (written by Taylor Swift)	2:02
4.	"Triptych Demon"	3:23
5.	"Official" (written by Charlotte Aitchison, Cook, Noonie Bao, Patrik Berger and Finn Keane)	3:05
6.	"Crimson"	1:26
7.	"Life Speed"	3:51
Total length:		21:49

Disc six – A. G. Spoken Word
No.	Title	Length
1.	"Could It Be"	2:34
2.	"The End Has No End" (written by Julian Casablancas)	3:03
3.	"No Yeah"	0:55
4.	"Green Beauty"	3:09
5.	"Unreal"	1:57
6.	"2021"	1:56
7.	"Hold On"	4:10
Total length:		17:44

Disc seven – A. G. Extreme Vocals
No.	Title	Producer(s)	Length
1.	"Today" (written by Billy Corgan)		3:54
2.	"Chandelier" (written by Sia Furler and Jesse Shatkin)		3:35
3.	"Idyll" (written by Life Sim)	Cook; Caroline Polachek^{[a]}	5:01
4.	"Show Me What" (with Cecile Believe)		2:50
5.	"Somers Tape"	Cook; Alex Somers^{[a]}	2:49
6.	"Crimson and Clover" (written by Tommy James and Peter Lucia)		4:08
7.	"Alright" (written by Cook and Tomas Tammemets)	Cook; Matt Rad^{[a]}	4:27
Total length:			26:44

Notes

- ^{^[a]} signifies additional producer
- "Acid Angel" contains a sample of "Concrete Angel", performed by Hannah Diamond, written by Gareth Emery and Christina Novelli.
- "Beetlebum" is a cover of "Beetlebum", performed by Blur.
- "DJ Every Night" is a rework of "Every Night", performed by Hannah Diamond.
- "The Best Day" is a cover of "The Best Day", performed by Taylor Swift.
- "Official" is a cover of "Official", performed by Charli XCX.
- "The End Has No End" is a cover of "The End Has No End", performed by The Strokes.
- "No Yeah" interpolates the lyrics of "Oh Yeah", the lead single (released only a week after the release of 7G) from Cook's second album Apple.
- "Today" is a cover of "Today", performed by The Smashing Pumpkins.
- "Chandelier" is a cover of "Chandelier", performed by Sia.
- "Idyll" is a cover of "IDL", performed by Life Sim.
- "Crimson and Clover" is a cover of "Crimson and Clover", performed by Tommy James & The Shondells.

== Personnel ==
Credits are adapted from an image found within the deluxe box set purchase.

=== Musicians ===
- A. G. Cook – production, drums, guitar, supersaw, piano, nord, voice, vocals
- Alaska Reid – voice ("Green Beauty"), vocals ("Crimson and Clover")
- Alex Somers – additional production ("Somers Tape")
- Baseck – additional production ("Polyphloisboisterous")
- Caroline Polachek – vocals ("Chandelier", "Idyll", "Alright"), additional production ("Idyll")
- Cecile Believe – featured vocals ("Show Me What")
- Hannah Diamond – vocals ("Acid Angel", "DJ Every Night", "Alright")
- HYD – voice ("No Yeah", "Alright")
- Matt Rad – additional production ("Alright")
- Sounds Like a U Problem – voice ("2021")
- Timothy Luke – vocals ("Crimson")
- Tommy Cash – vocals ("Alright")

=== Technical ===
All tracks mixed and mastered by A. G. Cook, except "Alright", mixed and mastered by Geoff Swan.
