= Hey QT =

2014 single by QT

Single by QT
- Released: 26 August 2014
- Genre: Dance-pop
- Length: 3:55
- Label: XL
- Songwriters: Alexander Cook; Sophie Xeon
- Producers: A. G. Cook; Sophie

Hayden Dunham singles chronology
"Hey QT" (2014)	"No Shadow" (2021)

Music video
- "Hey QT" on YouTube

"Hey QT" is the only single by the one-off music project QT. The project consisted of American performance artist Hayden Dunham, British producers A. G. Cook and Sophie, and British singer Harriet Pittard. The song was released on 26 August 2014 via XL Recordings. The single's release was accompanied by a photo of QT with a blonde wig trimmed into a messy bob cut. The promotional image was made by Diamond Wright, a team that includes PC Music musician Hannah Diamond.

== Composition ==
"Hey QT" (2014)
Peter Robinson characterized the song as "arguably the first hipster novelty single."

"Hey QT" is a dance-pop song composed in the key of F major, with a tempo of 129 beats per minute. Its production uses synthesizer melodies and an irregular beat comprised of staccato snare hits. It features a call and response hook of "Hey QT! Yeah?". Although Dunham portrays QT, the song's vocals are actually by British singer Harriet Pittard, who also records as Zoee. Her voice was shifted to a higher pitch, and the song has a girlish, cute aesthetic. She said that the lyrics describe a "feeling of sensing someone's presence even when they are not in the same physical space". "Hey QT" includes a metanarrative about the song itself.

== Release and promotion ==
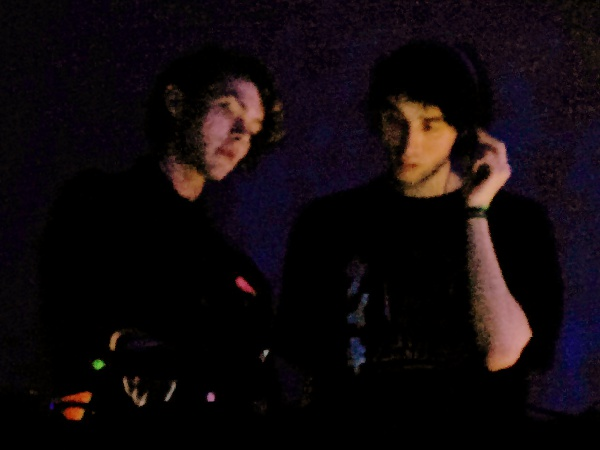
Sophie (left) and A. G. Cook (right) performing "Hey QT" in 2015

The song was debuted at a Boiler Room show in Los Angeles promoting Hudson Mohawke's Chimes EP. A digital broadcast by Eric Wareheim opened the performance. Dunham performed the song as QT, opening the act by sitting down and reading a fashion magazine while a voiceover endorsed the QT energy drink. Dunham then lip synced "Hey QT" while appearing disinterested.

Diplo premiered his remix of "Hey QT" on 6 March 2015 through Annie Mac's BBC Radio 1 show. His reworking is more subdued, with a drop leading into the chorus. The remix was made available as a free download on WeTransfer.

== Critical reception ==
"Hey QT" was generally well received by music critics. Pitchfork named it "Best New Track". It placed 84th on The Village Voice's 2014 Pazz & Jop critics' poll. Public reaction to the song was divided, with some Internet users responding with confusion or repulsion.

"Hey QT" was chosen as number 14 on Pitchfork's "100 Best Tracks of 2014". Spin ranked the song 4th on its list of "The 101 Best Songs of 2014", The Fader listed the song 3rd, and Fact magazine placed "Hey QT" 37th on its year-end list. In 2017, Vice named it the 49th best EDM song of all time. In 2021, The Forty-Five's Sophie Walker named it the 39th best hyperpop song of all time.

== Music video ==
The music video for "Hey QT", directed by Bradley & Pablo, was released on 25 March 2015. The video depicts QT developing the DrinkQT energy drink. A laboratory measures her emotional state and distills it into the drink's formula. The video features CGI animations of DrinkQT, which were simulated in RealFlow and rendered using 3ds Max. It references Gap advertisements and includes product placement for Beats headphones.
