= Apple (A. G. Cook album) =

2020 studio album by A. G. Cook

Studio album by A. G. Cook
- Released: 18 September 2020
- Genre: Pop; hyperpop; experimental electronic
- Length: 39:39
- Label: PC Music
- Producer: A. G. Cook

A. G. Cook chronology
7G (2020)	Apple (2020)	Apple vs. 7G (2021)

Singles from Apple
- 1. "Lifeline" Released: 28 August 2019; 2. "Oh Yeah" Released: 20 August 2020; 3. "Xxoplex" Released: 4 September 2020; 4. "Beautiful Superstar" Released: 16 September 2020

Apple is the second studio album by English music producer, singer and head of record label PC Music, A. G. Cook. It was released through PC Music on 18 September 2020, coming just over a month after the release of his debut studio album 7G.

The album was supported by the singles "Lifeline", "Oh Yeah", "Xxoplex", and "Beautiful Superstar". The album cover was designed by graphic designer and frequent PC Music visual collaborator, Timothy Luke. Apple vs. 7G, a remix album consisting of songs from both Apple and 7G, was released on 28 May 2021.

== Background and recording ==
Cook first began teasing Apple's release in September 2018 via Instagram. In March 2020, Cook took to Instagram again to give an update on his record.

In May 2020, Cook performed as part of American DJ Porter Robinson's virtual musical festival Secret Sky, where he debuted new material.

Of the background and recording of Apple, and of its predecessor 7G, Cook spoke with The Recording Academy in September 2020, stating:

I actually finished the Apple album about a year ago. And I was just looking for the right way to contextualize it. And then with the 7G stuff, some of it was done kind of recently, but it's really an exploration of all the sounds that went into Apple. It's a time travel look at things I've been exploring since day one, since seven years ago when I was starting to do this full-time. Obviously I'm fairly prolific and work with different people. But also I just thought it was the most true version of me to be quite saturated and seeing things from many different angles at the same time. That just felt like the right way to do a debut.

== Release and promotion ==
On 28 August 2019, Cook released the single "Lifeline", with an accompanying music video by graphic designer and frequent PC Music visual collaborator, Timothy Luke.

On 12 August 2020, Cook released his debut studio album 7G and began teasing new material only a week after releasing the aforementioned album.

On 20 August, Cook announced Apple, along with the release of the single "Oh Yeah", and its accompanying music video, directed by Cook. The tracklist was also announced by Cook, and it revealed that "Lifeline" was on the album.

On 27 August, Cook launched the Apple Guild, an interactive alternate reality game where fans could unveil stems from Cook's songs, as well as participate in various communal activities via Discord, such as a battle of the bands event where fans were split into groups and created covers in 3 days which were then presented on a livestream via Twitch on 2 September.

On 4 September, Cook released the third single from the album, "Xxoplex", alongside a music video, directed by Timothy Luke.

Cook also announced Appleville, a free live music event on 12 September, featuring sets from many of Cook's friends and contemporaries, such as Charli XCX, Clairo, 100 gecs, Dorian Electra, Kero Kero Bonito, Hannah Diamond, as well as Cook himself. A VIP pass was offered via a Bandcamp compilation featuring a select few of the aforementioned battle of the bands covers. All proceeds from the VIP pass went to the Mermaids charity supporting transgender and gender variant children and their families, and the Black Cultural Archives.

On 17 September, a day before the album's release, Cook released the fourth single from the album, "Beautiful Superstar", alongside a music video, directed by Prosper Unger-Hamilton and Cook himself.

== Music ==
Apple is an experimental electronic, pop, and hyperpop album that features elements of trance, indie pop, electropop, rock, trap, eurodance, pop punk, lo-fi, eurotrance, synthwave and deconstructed club. Album opener "Oh Yeah" has been described as an homage to the Smashing Pumpkins and "as radio-friendly as Cook has ever been" with its "warm synth and trickle of brass." Cook's vocals were praised as "a leveled-up version of one of Daft Punk's best vocoder moments." "Xxoplex" is an experimental track that incorporates various electronic music styles "from stomping beats and abrasive whirrs of supersaw to its '90s trance synths and mid-'00s, Crazy Frog-reminiscent polyphonic aggravations". "Beautiful Superstar" is a rock-influenced song that references Cook's previous singles "Beautiful" and "Superstar". "Airhead" has been described as "a slice of downright euphoric electro-pop" and "a piece of bubblegum goodness" inspired by the work of Aphex Twin. "Jumper" "calls back to 00s pop-punk classics". "Lifeline" is an "icy melancholic" take on 1980s power ballads.

Cook also cited "classic songwriting" as something he was thinking about during the record-making process, listing artists like Shania Twain and Dolly Parton as influences. "I've been pretty directly inspired by the strands of Americana that have sometimes defied that category — Shania Twain is a really good example," Cook said. "[She] defines what pop is and what Americana and country are by actually jumping between those. To actually break those rules, you sorta have to build them up a bit. I definitely think about that quite a lot."

== Critical reception ==
Professional ratings
Aggregate scores
Source	Rating
Metacritic	78/100
Review scores
Source	Rating
AllMusic	4/5 stars
Clash	8/10
DIY	3/5 stars
Exclaim!	9/10
The Line of Best Fit	8/10
Loud and Quiet	7/10
MusicOMH	3.5/5 stars
The Observer	4/5 stars
Pitchfork	7.5/10
Tom Hull – on the Web	B

Apple has received generally positive reviews from music critics, with many critics considering the condensed runtime to be an improvement to the "daunting" 7G. Kayleigh Watson of The Line of Best Fit said "in the way that 7G meticulously unpicked Cook's innards so fans could see the master's mind at work, Apple weighs out the specifics and pours them into the melting pot".

Joe Vitagliano of American Songwriter said "Stepping back from the maximalism that is usually associated with the style, Apple presents a new way to think about what 'hyperpop' can be. Honestly, it presents a new way to think about what 'music' can be. Between the record's tear-jerker ballads, saw-clad dance tracks and alternate-universe Twain-esque pop cuts, Apple is a profound statement, proclaiming the artistic relevancy of an entire generation."

Dazed ranked the album as the 14th best of 2020.

== Track listing ==
All tracks written and produced by Cook, except where noted.

No.	Title	Writer(s)	Producer(s)	Length
1.	"Oh Yeah"			3:32
2.	"Xxoplex"			2:36
3.	"Beautiful Superstar"		Cook; Andrew Sarlo^{[a]}	4:42
4.	"Animals"	Daniel Lopatin		4:08
5.	"Airhead"	Cook; Hayden Dunham; Finn Keane		4:37
6.	"Haunted"			2:51
7.	"The Darkness"			5:11
8.	"Jumper"	Cook; Nicolas Petitfrère	Cook; Ö	3:05
9.	"Stargon"			4:51
10.	"Lifeline"			4:06
Total length:				39:39

Notes

- ^{^[a]}signifies an additional producer
- "Beautiful Superstar" interpolates Cook's 2016 single, "Superstar".
- "Animals" is a cover of the Oneohtrix Point Never song of the same name.
- "Airhead" interpolates elements of "Breaking Ground" by Hyd.

== Personnel ==
Musicians

- A. G. Cook – vocals (tracks 1, 3–8, 10), guitar (tracks 1, 3, 4, 6, 8, 10), supersaw (tracks 2, 5, 7, 9)
- Alaska Reid – vocals (tracks 1, 3, 6)
- Hyd – vocals (tracks 4, 5, 7)
- Caroline Polachek – vocals (tracks 7, 10)
- Hannah Diamond – vocals (track 7)
- Ö – vocals (track 8)

Technical

- Stuart Hawkes – mastering
- Geoff Swan – mixing
- Niko Battistini – mixing assistance

== Release history ==
Region	Date	Format	Label	Ref.
Various	18 September 2020	Digital download; streaming	PC Music	
Various	15 October 2020	LP	PC Music	
