= Second Sky =

Electronic music festival

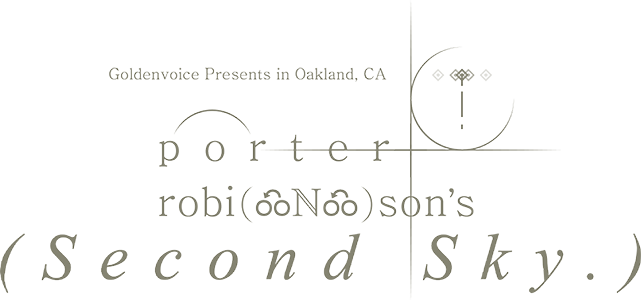
- Genre: Electronic music festival
- Inaugurated: June 15, 2019; 7 years ago
- Founder: Porter Robinson
- Most recent: October 29, 2022; 4 years ago
- Sponsor: Goldenvoice
- Website: secondskyfest.com

Second Sky is an electronic music festival founded by the American musician Porter Robinson.

== History ==
As of May 2025, five festivals have been organized:

Date(s)	Event	Location	Ref.
June 15, 2019 – June 16, 2019	Second Sky	Middle Harbor Shoreline Park, Oakland, California, United States	
May 9, 2020 – May 10, 2020	Secret Sky	Virtual event	
April 24, 2021	Secret Sky	Virtual event	
September 18, 2021 – September 19, 2021	Second Sky	Oakland Arena Grounds, Oakland, California, United States	
October 29, 2022	Second Sky	Oakland Arena Grounds, Oakland, California, United States	
