= Kero Kero Bonito discography =

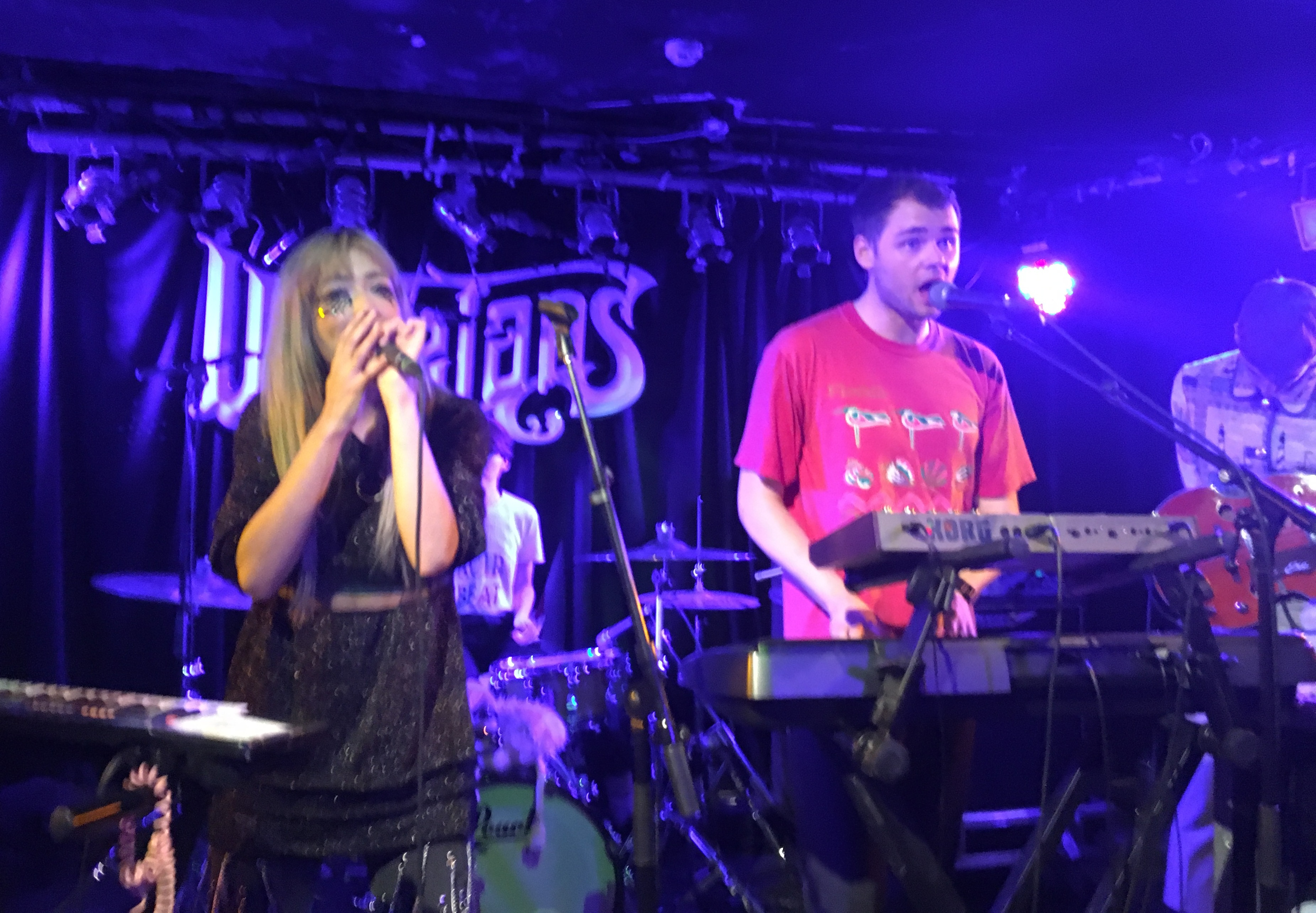
- Kero Kero Bonito performing in 2018
- Studio albums: 2
- EPs: 5
- Compilation albums: 1
- Singles: 38
- Music videos: 18
- Mixtapes: 1
- Remixes: 7

Kero Kero Bonito is a British indie pop band formed by Sarah Perry, Gus Lobban, and Jamie Bulled. Their discography consists of two studio albums, one mixtape, one compilation album, five extended plays, 38 singles, seven remixes, and 18 music videos.

== Albums ==
=== Studio albums ===
List of studio albums, with selected chart positions
Title	Details	Peak chart positions				
Title	Details	US Sales	US Heat	US Indie	US Vinyl	US World
Bonito Generation	Released: 26 October 2016; Label: Double Denim, Sony Japan; Formats: CD, LP, cassette, digital download, streaming	—	—	—	15	9
Time 'n' Place	Released: 1 October 2018; Label: Polyvinyl; Formats: CD, LP, cassette, digital download, streaming	63	1	6	5	—
"—" denotes items which were not released in that country or failed to chart.

=== Compilation albums ===
List of compilation albums, with selected chart positions
Title	Details	Peak chart positions
Title	Details	US Sales
Civilisation	Released: 10 September 2021; Label: Polyvinyl; Formats: LP, CD, cassette, digital download, streaming	61

== Mixtapes ==
List of mixtapes
Title	Details	Peak chart positions
Title	Details	US Sales
Intro Bonito	Released: 30 September 2013; Label: Self-released; Formats: CD, digital download, streaming	42

== Extended plays ==
List of extended-plays, with selected chart positions
Title	Details	Peak chart positions		
Title	Details	US Heat	US Indie	US Vinyl
Bonito Recycling	Released: 29 September 2014; Label: Double Denim; Formats: Digital download	—	—	—
Bonito (Retakes)	Released: 30 May 2017; Label: Double Denim; Formats: Digital download	—	—	—
TOTEP	Released: 20 February 2018; Label: self-released; Formats: CD, LP, cassette, digital download, streaming	6	22	20
Civilisation I	Released: 30 September 2019; Label: Polyvinyl; Formats: Digital download, streaming	—	—	—
Civilisation II	Released: 21 April 2021; Label: Polyvinyl; Formats: Digital download, streaming	—	—	—
"—" denotes items which were not released in that country or failed to chart.

== Singles ==
=== As lead artist ===
List of singles as lead artist, showing year released and album name
Title	Year	Album
"Weapons Grade"	2011	Non-album singles
"Coursework Story"	2012	Non-album singles
"(Getting To) The Top"	2012	Non-album singles
"Ms. World" (featuring Mayu Tanaka)	2012	Non-album singles
"Laser Quest" (featuring Leigh)	2012	Non-album singles
"Fortune Teller"	2012	Non-album singles
"Wherever You Go"	2013	Non-album singles
"Why Aren't You Dancing?"	2013	Non-album singles
"Homework"	2013	Intro Bonito
"Flamingo"	2014	shh#ffb6c1
"Bonito Shopping"	2014	Non-album singles
"Fans (Are So Cool)"	2014	Non-album singles
"Build It Up"	2014	Non-album singles
"Sick Beat"	2014	Intro Bonito
"Picture This"	2015	Bonito Generation
"Chicken"	2015	Non-album single
"Lipslap"	2016	Bonito Generation
"Break"	2016	Bonito Generation
"Graduation"	2016	Bonito Generation
"Trampoline"	2016	Bonito Generation
"Heard a Song" (CFCF Remix)	2017	Bonito Retakes (Note: "Heard a Song (CFCF Remix)" is also included on the Japanese version of the album Bonito Generation.)
"Forever Summer Holiday" (Note: Initially released as its own single, "Forever Summer Holiday" was included on the Japanese release of Bonito Generation.)	2017	Non-album single
"Rock 'n' Roll Star"	2017	Covered in Gloria
"Fish Bowl"	2017	Bonito Generation
"Only Acting"	2018	TOTEP and Time 'n' Place
"Time Today"	2018	Time 'n' Place
"World Tour 2018"	2018	Non-album single
"Make Believe"	2018	Time 'n' Place
"Swimming"	2019	Time 'n' Place
"The Open Road"	2019	Non-album single
"When the Fires Come"	2019	Civilisation I
"It's Bugsnax!"	2020	Non-album single
"The Princess and the Clock"	2021	Civilisation II
"21/04/20"	2021	Civilisation II
"Rom Com 2021" (with Soccer Mommy)	2021	Non-album singles
"The Sneaker Dance"	2021	Non-album singles
"Cluck" (with Felicita)	2022	Spalarkle
"Legendary"	2023	Non-album single

=== As featured artist ===
List of singles as featured artist, showing year released and album name
Title	Year	Album
"Swipe" (Manon featuring Kero Kero Bonito)	2018	Teenage Diary
"Ringtone (remix)" (100 gecs featuring Charli XCX, Rico Nasty and Kero Kero Bonito)	2020	1000 Gecs and the Tree of Clues
"M'Lady" (S3RL remix) (Dorian Electra featuring Kero Kero Bonito)	2021	My Agenda (Deluxe)
"the situation" (mxmtoon featuring Kero Kero Bonito)	2024	Liminal Space

== Guest appearances ==
List of non-single guest appearances, with other performing artists
Title	Year	Other artist(s)	Album
"Flamingo (Julien Mier Remix)"	2016	Julien Mier	[2017]
"Heartbeat"	2020	—N/a	Save Stereogum: An ‘00s Covers Comp
"Cluck (🃟)"	2024	Felicita	Spælarkle
"Cluck (It's Not Abstract, It's The Figurative Of The Unnameable)"	2024	Felicita	Spælarkle
"Cluck (I Almost Forget I'm Human)"	2024	Felicita	Spælarkle
"Cluck (Like A Cataclysm)"	2024	Felicita	Spælarkle
"Cluck (So Body)"	2024	Felicita	Spælarkle
"Cluck (Pure Spirit)"	2024	Felicita	Spælarkle
"Cluck (Yo DMX Krew!)"	2024	Felicita	Spælarkle
"Cluck (🃟)"	2024	Felicita	Spælarkle
"Cluck (A Perfect Animal Inside Her)"	2024	Felicita	Spælarkle
"Cluck (Does God Really Exist? God Is Virtual Reality)"	2024	Felicita	Spælarkle
"Cluck (Moment)"	2024	Felicita	Spælarkle
"Cluck (Serenity In Hallucination)"	2024	Felicita	Spælarkle
"Cluck (Eternity Is Non-Being)"	2024	Felicita	Spælarkle
"Cluck (Movement Explains Form)"	2024	Felicita	Spælarkle
"Cluck (Eternity Is Renewal)"	2024	Felicita	Spælarkle
"Cluck (Spælarkle)"	2024	Felicita	Spælarkle

== Remixes ==
Title	Artist	Year
"Money" (Kero Kero Bonito Remix)	Love and Hates	2011
"Daytime Disco" (Kero Kero Bonito Remix)	Spazzkid featuring Neon Bunny	2015
"Story" (Gus Kero Kero Bonito Remix)	Magdalena Bay	2020
"The Light" (Kero Kero Bonito Remix)	Metronomy	2020
"Slumber Party" (Kero Kero Bonito Remix)	Ashnikko featuring Princess Nokia	2021
"rom com 2021" (Kero Kero Bonito Remix)	Soccer Mommy	2021
"MBGATE" (Kero Kero Bonito Remix)	Max Tundra	2022

== Music videos ==
Title	Year	Director(s)
"Why Aren't You Dancing?	2013	Tom Lilly
"Homework"	2013	Kero Kero Bonito and Tom Lilly
"Intro Bonito"	2014	Patrick Clopon
"Lipslap"	2016	Theo Davies
"Break"	2016	Kero Kero Bonito
"Trampoline"	2016	Theo Davies
"Forever Summer Holiday"	2017	Theo Davies
"Only Acting"	2018	Kero Kero Bonito
"You Know How It Is"	2018	Kero Kero Bonito and Josh Homer
"Time Today"	2018	Kero Kero Bonito and James Hankins
"Make Believe"	2018	Kero Kero Bonito and James Hankins
"Flyway"	2018	Kero Kero Bonito
"Swimming"	2019	Kero Kero Bonito and James Hankins
"When the Fires Come"	2019	James Hankins
"The Princess and the Clock"	2021	Dan W Jacobs
"21/04/20"	2021	Dan W Jacobs
"Well Rested" (live version)	2021	Henry Croston
"The Sneaker Dance"	2021	Nick Harwood
