= Jay Som discography =

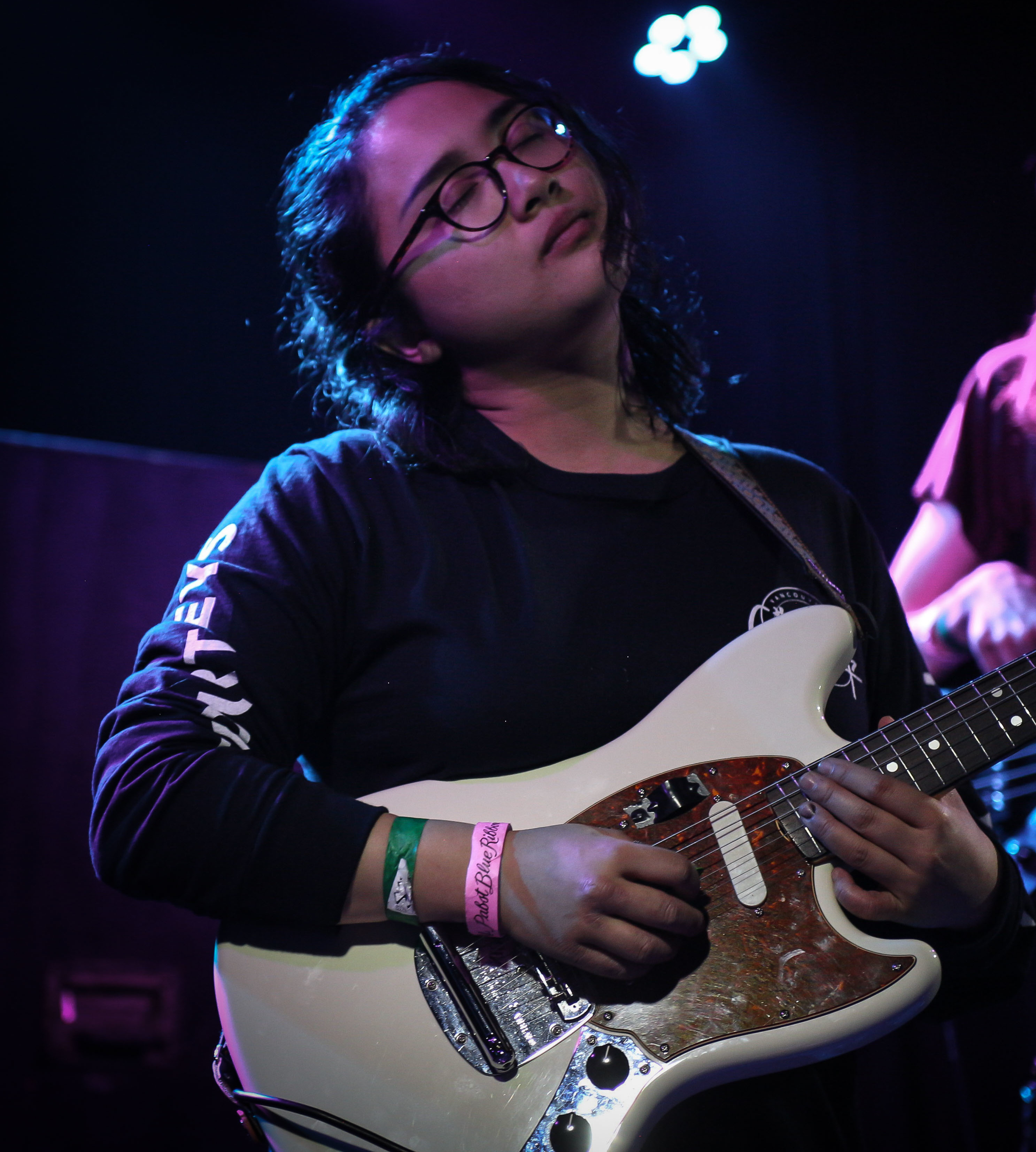
- Jay Som performing at First Avenue nightclub in March 2017
- Studio albums: 4
- EPs: 2
- Singles: 19
- Music videos: 6

American singer-songwriter and multi-instrumentalist Jay Som has released four studio albums, two extended plays (EPs), nineteen singles, and six music videos. Duterte grew up playing the trumpet and guitar, and began writing and recording music at the age of 12, and had originally intended to join a jazz music conservatory program, later focusing on songwriting. Her debut studio album Turn Into was released in June 2016, and received generally favorable reviews from critics. Everybody Works was released in March 2017, and landed on multiple music publications' Best of 2017 lists. It reached number 17 on the Billboard Heatseekers Albums and number 46 on the US Billboard Independent Albums charts.

== Studio albums ==
List of studio albums, with selected chart positions
Title	Album details	Peak chart positions	
Title	Album details	US Heat.	US Indie
Turn Into (collection of songs)	Released: July 22, 2016; Label: Polyvinyl; Formats: Digital download, streaming	–	–
Everybody Works	Released: March 10, 2017; Label: Polyvinyl, Double Denim; Formats: Digital download, streaming	17	46
Anak Ko	Released: August 23, 2019; Label: Polyvinyl, Inertia, Lucky Number; Formats: Digital download, streaming	2	13
Belong	Released: October 10, 2025; Label: Polyvinyl; Formats: Vinyl, CD, Tape, Digital download, streaming	–	–

== Extended plays ==
Title	EP details
Nothing's Changed (with Justus Proffit)	Released: September 28, 2018; Label: Polyvinyl; Formats: Digital download, streaming
And Other Things (with Routine and Annie Truscott)	Released: November 20, 2020; Label: Friends Of, Dead Oceans; Formats: Digital download, streaming

== Singles ==
=== As lead artist ===
Song	Year	Album
"I Think You're Alright"	2016	Non-album singles
"Rush"	2016	Non-album singles
"Radio Silence"	2017	Non-album singles
"Lose"	2017	Non-album singles
"Pirouette"	2018	Non-album singles
"O.K., Meet Me Underwater"	2018	Non-album singles
"Invisible Friend" (with Justus Proffit)	2018	Everything's Changed
"Turn the Other Cheek"	2018	Non-album singles
"A Thousand Words"	2020	Non-album singles
"Can't Sleep"	2020	Non-album singles
"Hurry Home" (with No Rome and beabadoobee)	2020	Non-album singles
"Cady Road" (with Routine and Annie Truscott)	2020	And Other Things
"Calm and Collected" (with Routine and Annie Truscott)	2020	And Other Things
"Anything at All" (with Bachelor and Palehound)	2021	Doomin' Sun
"Stay in the Car" (with Bachelor and Palehound)	2021	Doomin' Sun
"Sick of Spiraling" (with Bachelor and Palehound)	2021	Doomin' Sun
"I See It Now" (with Bachelor and Palehound)	2021	Non-album single
"Trouble" (with Troye Sivan)	2022	Three Months
"If I Could" (from I Saw the TV Glow)	2024	I Saw the TV Glow soundtrack

=== As featured artist ===
Title	Year	Album
"Home" (Hrishikesh Hirway featuring Jay Som)	2022	Non-album single
"Boring Again" (Luna Li featuring Jay Som)	2022	Duality
"Sleepless" (Bombay Bicycle Club featuring Jay Som)	2023	My Big Day
"Milk" (Dream, Ivoryfeaturing Jay Som)	2023	Non-album single

=== Guest appearances ===
Title	Year	Other artist(s)	Album
"White Flag"	2017	Various Artists	Group Effort, Vol.1
"In Your Eyes (Reflection)"	2021	Anjimile	Reunion
"Mom and Dead - Jay Som Remix"	2021	Owen	The Avalanche Remixes
"Growing Pain"	2022	Various artists	Ocean Child: Songs of Yoko Ono
"Boring Again"	2022	Luna Li	Duality

== Music videos ==
List of music videos, showing year released and directors
Title	Year	Director(s)	Ref.
"Ghost"	2016	Neil Davis	
"Baybee"	2017	Charlotte Hornsby and Jesse Ruuttila	
"One More Time, Please"	2017	Christopher Good	
"The Bus Song"	2017	Michelle Zauner	
"Tenderness"	2019	Jackson James	
"Nighttime Drive"	2019	Han Hale	
