= Icarus (EP) =

EP by Cryalot
- Released: 2 September 2022
- Studio: Jennifer Walton's home studio
- Genre: Noise; metal; experimental pop
- Length: 23:40
- Label: AWAL
- Producer: Jennifer Walton

Singles from Icarus
- 1. "Hell Is Here" Released: 30 June 2022; 2. "Touch the Sun" Released: 27 July 2022; 3. "Labyrinth" Released: 31 August 2022

Icarus is the debut EP of Cryalot, a solo project by Kero Kero Bonito vocalist Sarah Midori Perry, released 2 September 2022 by AWAL.

== Background ==
The lead single "Hell Is Here" was released on 30 June alongside a music video directed by Joshua Homer. The second single "Touch the Sun" was released 27 July along with a music video directed by Perry. According to Perry, the song "is about the feeling of being invincible and the unshakable belief that you can overcome any difficulties" and it "depicts the beginning of the Icarus story; celebrating the courage when he decides to take flight, the excitement of breaking free and knowing that leap of faith is worth all the risks." The third single "Labyrinth" was released on 31 August with a music video. A fourth music video for "See You Again" was released 7 September, and a fifth video for "Hurt Me" was released 22 September.

According to BroadwayWorld's Michael Major, Perry "originally learnt the tale of Icarus from a songbook at school", but that that particular version's "interpretation was a celebration of Icarus' courage in his moment of glory rather than the usual cautionary tale about the fate of man overreaching his limits." Perry was "instantly drawn to this interpretation which showed her a view of the world where, instead of being tied down by the risks of flight, we soar the sky as we become something more", and this EP "explores the success and failures of attempting to do so." Major also notes the project as "channel[ing] the darker aesthetics of noise music and metal being fused with experimental pop", "playing with sonic extremes", and "oscillat[ing] between the black metal inspired electronics of tracks like 'Hell Is Here' and the sheer pop intensity of 'Hurt Me'".

In an interview with Rolling Stone, Perry explained that the name Cryalot originated from a dark, depressed "period where I was literally crying a lot", where she "was going through a really dark period for a few years, from 2018 and going over lockdown." The project was intended as an outlet for those emotions, and the interest in making a musical project out of it "clicked when I met Jennifer Walton." Perry called her "a great producer" with solo music that "has this darkness that I was really drawn to", and said that meeting Walton led Perry to "start properly thinking that I wanted to make something with her. Being on tour together with KKB for two years meant they "were spending almost all our time together and had this foundation, so when we got into the studio I was more comfortable expressing these more personal ideas." Lead single "Hell Is Here" was the first song written for the EP, and it follows a theme of "defeat".

In an interview with The Fader's Raphael Helfand, Walton described the goal of the EP by stating that "there's a link between the people that are into the more extreme pop stuff and noise music. It's about how far you can push pop sound design whilst still keeping it commercial-ish and digestible. With Cryalot, it was fun to purposely play with that — take pop structures and actively see how far we could go." As part of the costumes Perry wore for the album's music videos, she made wings for each. The "Hell Is Here" wings were made by Perry and her mother from pampas grass "kindly donated" by her neighbor, and the "Touch the Sun" wings "were made of branches that fell from a tree in the garden." The EP was recorded in Walton's home studio.

== Style and reception ==
Icarus ratings
Review scores
Source	Rating
Pitchfork	6.8/10
Slant Magazine	3.5/5 stars
Spectrum Culture	70%

Pitchfork's Sam Goldner compares Icarus to Perry's previous work by writing "Instead of singing over a miniature symphony of Donkey Kong Country MIDI flutes, she and producer Jennifer Walton opt for something a little more "Ponyboy": screeching nu-metal sub-bass thrashes and stomps its way through these songs, while bruised club beats provide a searing anchor for Perry's childlike vocals to glide overhead ... as though she's swapped out her colorful graduation gown for a shopping spree at Dolls Kill." Perry and Walton adorn the "J-poppy melody" of "Hell Is Here" with "cooing harmonies and gently twinkling piano" which are replaced in the chorus "with gutturally screamed vocals and a rubbery, wobbling bass tone that would make Datsik proud", showing Perry's "mastery of tension and release". This is also exemplified by "Labyrinth", a "tender power ballad whose glitching, yeule-y intro explodes into a cybernetic wall of rich, blasting synth chords." The EP's best moments "feel as if they were tailor-made to be spun at the next Heav3n party, but Perry transcends the project's trendy exterior with the same legitimate vulnerability that's made her a cult star in the first place."

Slant Magazine's Eric Mason calls the EP's "twee-meets-metal turn ... a natural progression for [Perry]" with a "narrative sensibility with [Kero Kero Bonito's] "The Princess and the Clock", an allegorical fairy tale set to synths, but [Icarus] heightens the contrast between Bonito's endearingly youthful vocal style and explosive electronic production." "Touch the Sun" has "maximalist hyperpop production [which] frequently flips between glitches, distorted bass, and ambient noise, so when Bonito sings, "I don't care if I fall", her sweet tone highlights her vulnerability and sets up her story of self-destruction", continued with the "Hurt Me" chorus "Don't try to hurt me/'Cause the angels are on my side" which plays over a trap beat. "Labyrinth" and "See You Again" "evoke M83's Hurry Up, We're Dreaming with their wistful meditations and sonic grandeur." Per Spectrum Culture's Aymeric Dubois, Icarus seems to be telling its namesake myth backwards, starting with the "frenetic hyperpop and bubblegum ballad" "Touch the Sun" which "distorts the mythological tragedy to point the finger at the jealous characters who want to burn her wings", and closing on the "more triumphant flourish" of "See You Again" on which "Cryalot summarizes perfectly her interpretation of the story of Icarus as misunderstood rather than doomed by hubris: 'We are eternal/And we are free/And the blue sky hides unlimited possibilities'".

== Track listing ==
All tracks are written by Sarah Midori Perry and Jennifer Walton. All tracks produced by Walton.

Icarus track listing
No.	Title	Length
1.	"Touch the Sun"	4:38
2.	"Hurt Me"	3:24
3.	"Hell Is Here"	2:24
4.	"Labyrinth"	4:12
5.	"See You Again"	5:29
6.	"Labyrinth" (Edit)	3:33
Total length:		23:40

Icarus Remixes track listing
No.	Title	Length
1.	"Touch the Sun" (Wavedash remix)	3:02
2.	"Hurt Me" (Viticz remix)	3:17
3.	"Hell Is Here" (Melt-Banana remix)	2:48
4.	"Labyrinth" (Neggy Gemmy remix)	5:46
5.	"See You Again" (96 Back remix)	3:40
Total length:		18:34
