= Labyrinth (Cryalot song) =

2022 song

Single by Cryalot

from the EP Icarus
- Released: 31 August 2022
- Length: 4:11; 3:32 (Edit)
- Label: AWAL
- Songwriters: Sarah Midori Perry, Jennifer Walton
- Producer: Jennifer Walton

Cryalot singles chronology
"Touch the Sun" (2022)	"Labyrinth" (2022)

Music video
- Labyrinth on YouTube

"Labyrinth" is the third single from Icarus, the debut EP from Kero Kero Bonito singer Sarah Midori Perry's solo project Cryalot. "Labyrinth" was released 31 August 2022, cowritten by Perry and producer Jennifer Walton, and came with a music video directed by Joshua Homer.

== Style ==
Perry described the song's narrative as being "about hope and our ability to dream even when we are trapped in our own reality", "draw[ing] parallels between the myth of Icarus and the confines of our own emotional landscapes." Pitchfork's Sam Goldner calls the song "a tender power ballad whose glitching, yeule-y intro explodes into a cybernetic wall of rich, blasting synth chords" which showcases Perry's "mastery of tension and release". Slant Magazine's Eric Mason says the song "evoke[s] M83's Hurry Up, We're Dreaming with [its] wistful meditations and sonic grandeur." Spectrum Culture's Aymeric Dubois wrote that on the song, Perry "uses a melancholy tone to mesmerize through catharsis, while her ethereal voice melts perfectly on the atmospheric keys of the instrumental."

== Music video ==
The Joshua Homer-directed video is set in an abandoned building in Bethnal Green. BroadwayWorld's Michael Major describes as "dream-like" and says it "conjures a shadowy, woozy setting for Sarah and Jennifer Walton ... to play out the song's hopeful narrative."

== Track listings ==
- Digital download and streaming
1. "Labyrinth" (Edit) – 3:32
- Spotify single
1. "Labyrinth" (Edit) – 3:32
2. "Labyrinth" – 4:11
3. "Touch the Sun" – 4:37
4. "Hell Is Here"– 2:23
