= Touch the Sun =

Touch the Sun may refer to:

== Television ==
- Touch the Sun (Australian TV series), 1988

== Music ==
- Touch the Sun, a 1995 album by Show-Ya
- "Touch the Sun" (song), a 2022 song by Cryalot
