= Hell Is Here =

Hell Is Here may refer to:

- Hell Is Here (album), 1999 album by the Crown
- "Hell Is Here" (song), 2022 single by Cryalot
- "Hell Is Here", song by Saves the Day from the album Sound the Alarm
