= Turn Into =

Turn Into may refer to:

- Turn Into (song), a 2006 single by Yeah Yeah Yeahs
- Turn Into (album), a 2016 album by Jay Som
