= Well Rested =

Well Rested or Well-Rested may refer to:

- "Well Rested" (Battle for Dream Island), a 2023 web series episode
- "Well Rested", a 2021 song by Kero Kero Bonito from the album Civilisation II
- "Well-Rested", a 2016 song by Miranda Lambert from the album The Weight of These Wings
