= Zoom Lens (record label) =

American independent record label

- Founded: 2009
- Genre: Electronic, dream pop, j-pop, shoegaze, ambient, noise rock
- Country of origin: United States
- Location: Los Angeles, California
- Official website: zoom-lens.org

Zoom Lens is an independent Los Angeles-based record label founded and operated by Faye Yim. The label was created "in order to explore the implications of popular culture on the human condition and the duality artistic expression discovered through an intersection of both local and international sounds".

== History ==
In 2009, Zoom Lens was founded by Faye Yim, who was at the time "fascinated with Japanese harsh noise and film" and sought out to release music due to the influence of the Orange County experimental music scene.

The first Zoom Lens release was an album by Yim under the name of Yuko Imada entitled "Ome," which came packaged as a CD-R contained in a DVD case soaked in the artist's own blood.

In January 2015, Zoom Lens had its first video broadcast on national television through Adult Swim with Meishi Smile and their video "AJS."

On March 15, 2016, Zoom Lens had its first official SXSW showcase.

On February 22, 2022, the end of Zoom Lens was announced from a message on the label's site, while a new label and art collective, Meta Physica, was announced by Yim.

On October 27, 2023, Zoom Lens returned to operations, announcing a 10th anniversary edition of the Meishi Smile album Lust and plans for events in 2024.

== Sound ==
Zoom Lens' sound has been categorized as "unpredictable", exploring sounds ranging from ambient music, noise music, chiptune, electropop, shoegaze and other forms of experimental music. The sound of Zoom Lens has been described as "broadening definitions of punk", as well as "dreamy indie with 8-bit and rave euphoria."

== Imagery ==
=== Aesthetics ===
The Fader has noted Zoom Lens as "one of the most aesthetically compelling labels in existence"..

Many of Zoom Lens' images revolved around the concept of burnt photography. This practice was first put to use for an EP by Party Girl released in 2011. The imagery was said to be providing feelings about the disconnection towards memories, a commentary on "silver age" Japanese idol music (or Kayōkyoku) and the over-saturation of the digital music market. This theme was also explored in Zoom Lens merchandise.

In 2014, a shirt based on a manipulated image of Yukiko Okada was released on Zoom Lens' official site, with a banner reading "burn a face of forgotten idols to obfuscate the memories of the truth you lost". In a Red Bull Music Academy interview, Yim noted that they had felt a sadness in Okada's music and story, and "wanted to show people that Okada was a real person with real feelings, and that we all have such humanity."

Music critic Adam Harper has noted some of the imagery as "a conscious attempt at confronting and defamiliarising the visual objectification of women (and its consequences)."

== Influences ==
=== East Asian and global influence ===
The label has been referenced as one of "the best places for Japanese-inspired indie pop in the online underground," and it hosted a variety of online shows with Japanese venue 2.5D.

Red Bull Music Academy had also noted Zoom Lens' international roster, which "encompasses artists from Japan, the Philippines, Singapore and the US." and "[spans] cultural and continental canyons through our digital world."

While Yim had identified Zoom Lens as something far more encompassing beyond their own personal views, they have noted much of the label was established due to the influence of being a fourth-generation Japanese (or Yonsei (Japanese diaspora)) and Chinese American, expressing that their identity felt rather unusual and lonely, and that Japanese culture in America was still seen as taboo.

The label had ultimately sought out for the artists to "represent themselves for who they are, not just for the assumptions people make about their country". Despite heavy East Asian influence, Yim had said that the label was also about being unashamed of who you are and sharing the weight of existence.

== Artists ==
=== Current ===
*Alex Wang
- BEDSPACER
- The Bilinda Butchers
- Ceramiks
- LLLL
- oh my muu
- Mark Redito
- Meishi Smile
- moon mask
- Plaster Cast

=== Former ===
*Aria Rostami
- bod [包家巷]
- Cyclops Rock
- DJ Obake
- Flowerinth
- i-fls
- Infinity Shred
- Kenneth Takanami
- KiWi
- LAY BAC
- mus.hiba
- OHPLEASEDONT
- Tallinn
- This Deep Well
- Thought Tempo
- U-Pistol
- WHITE BIKINI
- Xyloid
- yasumiyasumi
- Yeule
- Yoshino Yoshikawa

== Discography ==
Catalog #	Release date	Artist	Album title	Notes
ZL-01	2009	Yuko Imada	Ome	Edition of 20 CD-R. Contained blood-soaked letter in DVD case.
ZL-02	2009	Yuko Imada	Untitled (Moon)	Edition of 10 CD-R. Contained in hand-stamped envelopes.
ZL-03	2009	Class of 1923	Class of 1923	Edition of 30 CD-R. Contained in hard CD case w/ unique inserts and photographs
ZL-04	2009	nono.	nono.	Edition of 50 CD-R. Contained in slipcase w/ lyric inserts.
ZL-05	2010	Thieves of Zozo	Never Knows Best	Edition of 100 CD-R. Contained in slipcase.
ZLEP-01	2010	Thieves of Zozo	Never Knows B-Sides	
ZLEP-02	2010	Carnage '84	Obliterfiscantionalisms	
ZLEP-03	2010	MEISHI SMILE	Synthetic Girl	
ZLEP-04	2010	Young Henry	Pollen	
ZLEP-05	2010	Party Girl	Foulin'	
ZL-06	2011	Young Henry	Octagon	
ZL-07	2011	Zoom Lens	V.A.	1st Zoom Lens Compilation.
ZL-08	2011	Yuko Imada	六本木 NIGHTLIFE	
ZL-09	2011	Smoke Room	Vol. 2	
ZLEP-06	2011	Thought Tempo	Soft Day	
ZLEP-07	2011	OHPLEASEDONT	It Goes Away	
ZL-10	01.01.12	Apollo Knives	The Harshest Winter	
ZL-11	2012	This Deep Well	From	
ZL-12	09.22.12	MEISHI SMILE	LUST	Edition of 30 cassettes. Contained lyrics sheet. 1st collaboration with Orchid Tapes.
ZLEP-08	2012	LAY BAC	Shortcuts	
ZLMT-01	2012	Aegyokiller	Island of Love (Jeju)	First in a series of Zoom Lens mixtapes.
ZLMT-03	2012	MEISHI SMILE	ZLMT-03	
ZLMT-06	2012	Apollo Knives	ZLMT-06	
ZLP-01	2012	Various Artists	Promo Mix	
ZL-13	01.19.13	i-fls	Residential town loneliness	
ZL-14	04.01.13	Rinkin Panku	Rinkin Panku	April Fools Release.
ZL-15	06.30.13	Uio Loi	Uio Loi	
ZL-16	2012	Slime Girls	Vacation Wasteland	Later released on cassette in 2013.
ZL-17	2013	yasumiyasumi	Tokyo Digital Love	Edition of 50 cassettes. Contained handmade zine.
ZLEP-09	2013	The Bilinda Butchers	The Lovers' Suicide!	
ZLEP-10	2013	Aegyokiller	Gogal	
ZLMT-10	2013	KinokoNiji	Witches' Electric Warp	
ZLMT-12	2013	The Bilinda Butchers	泣かないで	
ZLMT-15	2013	Wakesleep	Time Life / Body Fusion 2	
ZL-18	2014	MEISHI SMILE	LUST	Edition of 100 vinyl / 300 CD. 1st collaboration with Attack The Music. Remastered/reissue.
ZL-19	02.25.14	Space Boyfriend	bug spray (never give up)	
ZL-20	03.08.14	yeule	yeule	
ZL-21	06.17.14	LLLL	Paradice	Edition of 250 CD.
ZL-22	2014	Ulzzang Pistol	Girlfriend	
ZL-23	2014	Plaster Cast	مالتا	Credited as Malta.
ZL-24	12.28.14	DJ Obake	H	Edition of 100 CD. Contained postcard + sticker.
ZLEP-11	2014	KinokoNiji	Guts	
ZLEP-12	2014	Yoshino Yoshikawa	Yumetatsu Glider	
ZLEP-13	2014	i-fls	Fictional Standard EP	
ZLEP-14	2014	White Bikini	Omni	
ZLEP-15	2014	Slime Girls	Heart On Wave	
ZLEP-16	2014	LLLL	Paradice: Revisited By Friends & Lovers	
ZL×MARU-001	2014	Mikeneko Homeless x Yotsuba Lifestyle	LED MEMORY	Collaboration with Maltine Records.
ZLMT-18	2014	Aria Rostami	Intimate Inanimate	
ZLMT-19	2014	Revolution Boi	Hoodies Headphones and Cuties	
ZLP-02	2014	Various Artists	Untitled	Sold as a promotional release at shows. Later released online.
ZL-25	01.28.15	la pumpkin	pain everywhere. all the time.	Edition of 50 CD-R. Contained transparent cover + note. Online release party w/ SPF420.
ZL-26	05.19.15	Cyclops Rock	Crush Punk	
ZL-27	08.27.15	Tallinn	Special Economic Zone	Edition of 60 cassettes.
ZL-28	10.06.15	Meishi Smile	...Belong	Edition of 350 vinyl / 350 CD.
ZL-29	2015	yui lui	wonder	
ZLEP-17	2015	mus.hiba	White Girl Remixes	
ZLEP-18	2015	KiWi	Promise EP	
ZLEP-19	2015	Flowerinth	Code	
ZLEP-20	2015	Plaster Cast	Sunless	
ZLEP-21	2015	Meishi Smile	Breathe	
ZLEP-22	2015	The Bilinda Butchers	Sentimental Girls Violent Joke	
ZLEP-23	2015	oh my muu	Self Help	
ZLEP-24	2015	Thought Tempo	(The Flow)	
ZLEP-25	2015	This Deep Well	Entry	
ZLEP-26	2015	Ulzzang Pistol	Moonlight	
ZLP-03	2015	Various Artists	Belong (The Flow)	
ZL-30	12.02.16	Ulzzang Pistol	Waste	First 100 CD came with a poster.
ZL-31	2016	Yoshino Yoshikawa	Event Horizon	
ZLEP-27	2016	Plaster Cast	Permanence	Released as a 45 RPM 12" record.
ZLEP-28	2016	Meishi Smile	(reclamation)	Released as limited edition cassette.
ZLEP-29	2016	Xyloid	Assemblage	
ZLEP-30	2016	Flubber Rimm	The Cell	
ZLEP-31	2016	Yoshino Yoshikawa	Mirage	
ZLEP-32	2016	Yoshino Yoshikawa	Opt-Out	
ZLEP-33	2016	Thought Tempo	I Can Fila	
ZLP-04	2016	Various Artists	A Better Yesterday	
ZLP-05	2016	Various Artists	Fragility	
ZL-32	2017	Aria Rostami	Reform	
ZL-33	2017	Infinity Shred	Even Further	
ZL-34	27.06.17	FAKKU & ZOOM LENS	Metempsychosis	Edition of 350 vinyl / 350 CD. Came with a 36-page artbook, in collaboration with Fakku.
ZL-35	2017	yasumiyasumi	Tokyo Dreampop	
ZL-36	2017	bod [包家巷]	Piano Compositions [钢琴组成]	
ZLC-01	2017	LLLL	Chains "Phase 1: Resent"	
ZLC-02	2017	LLLL	Chains "Phase 2: Remain"	
ZLC-03	2017	LLLL	Chains "Phase 3: Reflect"	
ZLEP-32	2017	Yeule	Coma	
ZLC-04	2018	LLLL	Chains "Phase 4: Resembalance"	
ZLEP-35	2018	Tallinn	Varieties of Exile I	
ZL×MARU-002	2018	Meishi Smile, LLLL, U-Pistol	Always, (feat. Calendula)	Collaboration with Maltine Records.
ZL-41	2020	The Bilinda Butchers	Night And Blur	Neon green vinyl.
ZL-43	2020	Mark Redito	Natural Habitat	Run of 50 special edition vinyl was shipped with "Natural Habitat" blend coffee. 250 non-special records were also on sale. At least one test pressing also sold.
ZL-44	2021	Meishi Smile	Ressentiment	Limited run of LP records, as well as VHS records
(none)	2024	Meishi Smile	LUST [10th Anniversary Edition]	Released on clear vinyl and CD with accompanying booklets; 300 of each. Pre-orders of the album shipped with a bonus CD containing demos.
