= Touch the Sun (song) =

Single by Cryalot

from the EP Icarus
- Released: 27 July 2022
- Genre: Hyperpop
- Length: 4:38
- Label: AWAL
- Songwriters: Sarah Midori Perry, Jennifer Walton
- Producer: Jennifer Walton

Cryalot singles chronology
"Hell Is Here" (2022)	"Touch the Sun" (2022)	"Labyrinth" (2022)

Music video
- Touch the Sun on YouTube

"Touch the Sun" is a single from Kero Kero Bonito vocalist Sarah Midori Perry's solo project Cryalot, released 27 July 2022 by AWAL. The song is the second single from Cryalot's debut EP Icarus, and like the lead single "Hell Is Here", it was co-written by Perry and producer Jennifer Walton. "Touch the Sun" was released alongside a music video directed by Perry.

== Style ==
Per BroadwayWorld's Michael Major, "Touch the Sun" is "a colorful, ethereal track pinned down by absorbing hyper-pop electronics and delicate vocals" which "crystallizes the intense dichotomy that exists within the Cryalot universe with the trippy self-directed accompanying visuals providing further stark contrast to striking debut single "Hell Is Here"." Stereogum's James Rettig called it "brighter and sweeter than its predecessor." Rolling Stone's Selim Bulut called it a "flash of brightness" and a "cathartic release" amongst "all the EP's dark moments".

Per Perry, "Touch the Sun" "is about the feeling of being invincible and the unshakable belief that you can overcome any difficulties" and "depicts the beginning of the Icarus story; celebrating the courage when he decides to take flight, the excitement of breaking free and knowing that leap of faith is worth all the risks."
