= Everybody Works =

Studio album by Jay Som
- Released: March 10, 2017
- Genres: Bedroom pop; indie rock
- Length: 35:31
- Labels: Double Denim; Polyvinyl
- Producer: Melina Duterte

Jay Som chronology
Turn Into (2015)	Everybody Works (2017)	Anak Ko (2019)

Everybody Works is the second studio album by indie music artist Jay Som, released on March 10, 2017 by Double Denim Records and Polyvinyl Record Co. Everybody Works has received acclaim from music critics.

== Critical reception ==
Professional ratings
Aggregate scores
Source	Rating
AnyDecentMusic?	7.5/10
Metacritic	82/100
Review scores
Source	Rating
AllMusic	3.5/5 stars
American Songwriter	3/5 stars
The A.V. Club	B
Consequence of Sound	B
DIY	4/5 stars
Exclaim!	8/10
Pitchfork	8.6/10
PopMatters	8/10

At Metacritic, which assigns a normalized rating out of 100 to reviews from mainstream critics, Everybody Works received an average score of 82, based on 12 reviews, indicating "universal acclaim". Judy Berman, writing for Pitchfork, gave Everybody Works a positive review, stating, "Everybody Works is a careful, wise, and excellent album. It's not bedroom pop because it sounds a certain way, but because it feels so intimate"; she gave the album a "Best New Music" designation. Jody Amable, writing for Consequence of Sound, said, "Everybody Works is the next logical half-step from her Polyvinyl debut, Turn Into. That record was a hushed affair, mainly carried out in either softly-delivered vocals or a dose of distortion. The tender tendencies are still there, but she's singing with slightly more force than last time. Jay Som has built upon her established identity as a skilled songwriter with a long future ahead of her to craft a varied and vibrant record that's a steady, reliably smart listen from start to end."

=== Accolades ===
Publication	Accolade	Rank	Ref.
Exclaim	Top 20 Pop & Rock Albums of 2017	7	
Pitchfork	The 50 Best Albums of 2017	26	
Pitchfork	The 200 Best Albums of the 2010s	165	
Stereogum	The 50 Best Albums of 2017	23	
Paste	The 50 Best Albums of 2017	1	
Rolling Stone	50 Best Albums of 2017	29	
Entertainment Weekly	The 25 Best Albums of 2017	20	
Consequence of Sound	Top 50 Albums of 2017	48	
Under the Radar	Top 100 Albums of 2017	25	
Billboard	50 Best Albums of 2017	46	
Clash	50 Best albums of 2017	46	

== Track listing ==
All tracks are written by Melina Duterte.

CD pressing
No.	Title	Length
1.	"Lipstick Stains"	1:51
2.	"The Bus Song"	3:36
3.	"Remain"	2:19
4.	"1 Billion Dogs"	2:44
5.	"One More Time, Please"	3:42
6.	"Baybee"	3:45
7.	"(Bedhead)"	3:25
8.	"Take It"	3:19
9.	"Everybody Works"	3:28
10.	"For Light"	7:22
Total length:		35:31

== Personnel ==
- Melina Duterte – vocals, guitar, keyboards (2, 3, 5, 6, 8, 9), piano (1, 2, 5, 10), bass (2–6, 8–10), drums (2–6, 8–10), percussion (2, 5, 8, 9), accordion (1, 10), trumpet (2, 10)
- Zachary Elsasser – vocals on 2, 3, 5, 6, 8, 9, 10
- Oliver Pinnell – vocals on 3, 4, 5, 8, 9, 10
- Dylan Allard – vocals on 2, 3, 8, 9, 10

== Charts ==
Chart (2017)	Peak position
US Heatseekers Albums (Billboard)	17
US Independent Albums (Billboard)	46
