= Sarah Midori Perry =

British-Japanese singer

Sarah
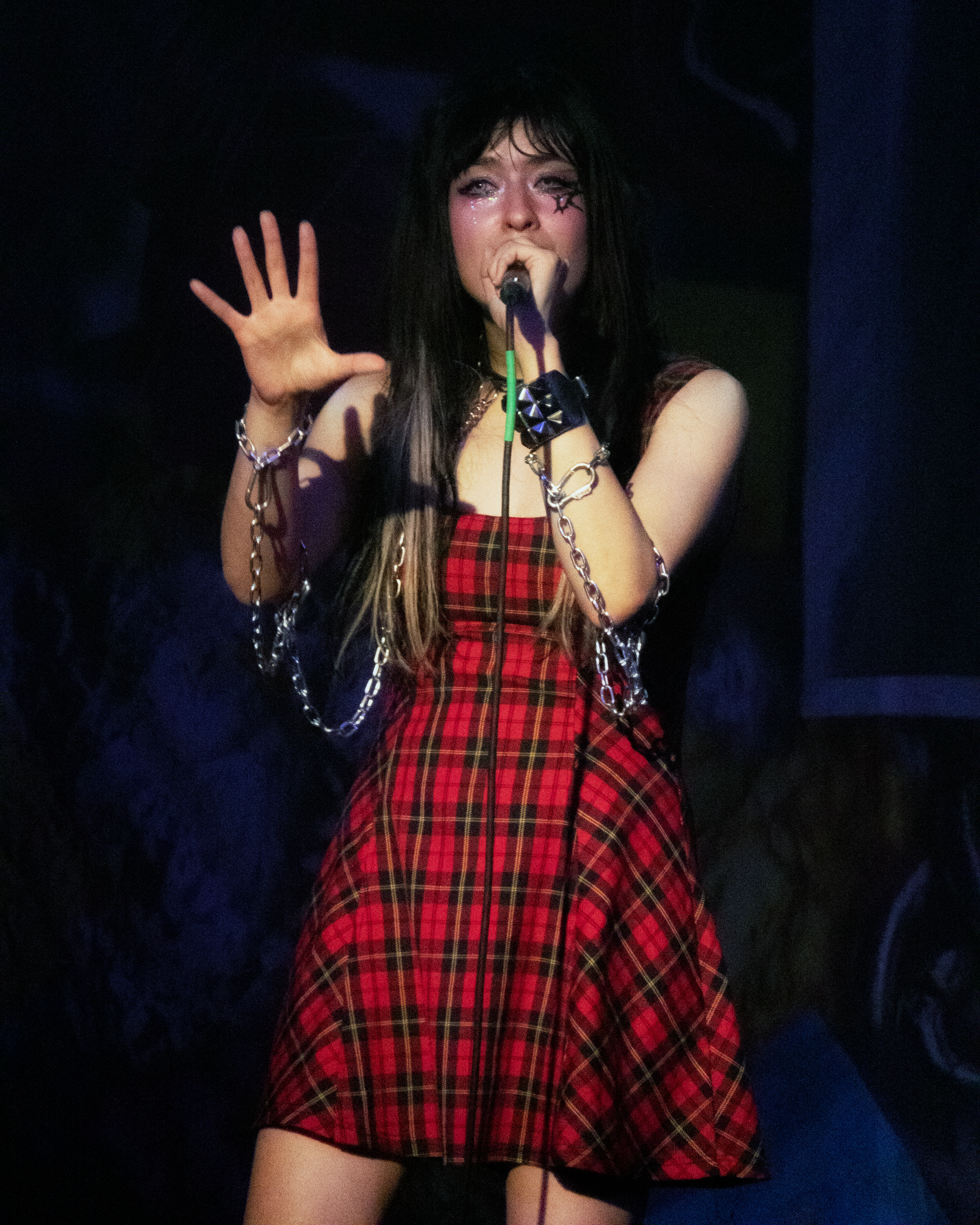
- Perry in 2019

Background information
- Also known as: Sarah Bonito; Cryalot
- Born: 4 March 1991 (age 35); Nagoya, Japan
- Genres: Pop; electronic; rock
- Occupations: Musician; DJ
- Instruments: Vocals; keyboards
- Label: AWAL
- Member of: Kero Kero Bonito

Sarah Midori Perry (Japanese: ペリーセーラ緑, Perī Sēra Midori) is a British-Japanese musician who is the lead vocalist of London-based indie pop band Kero Kero Bonito. She also sings and DJs/performs as both Sarah Bonito and Cryalot.

== Early life ==
Perry is of Japanese and British descent. She was born in Nagoya, and lived there until age 6, when her family moved to Otaru. At age 13, Perry and her family moved from Japan to the Midlands in the UK, where her father is originally from. She attended Kingston University London for a BA in Fine Arts.

== Solo career ==
On 30 June 2022, Perry released "Hell Is Here", her debut single under her solo project Cryalot and the lead single to her debut solo EP Icarus, which was released on 2 September 2022.

In addition to her solo work she has featured on many other projects. Electronic musician Spazzkid was a fan of Kero Kero Bonito and enlisted Perry to rap on "Truly" from his 2014 Promise EP. In 2014, she was also featured on the track "Horsey" by Macross 82-99. In 2015, she was featured on "Everyday", the debut single by producer Chroma-kei. In 2021, she featured on A. G. Cook's remix album Apple vs. 7G, performing vocals on the remix version of "The Darkness" alongside Hannah Diamond. In 2022, she was featured on the track "Starstud" by Matt Watson from his first full-length album, See You There.

== Discography ==
=== Extended plays ===
- Icarus (as Cryalot) (2022)
- Icarus Remixes (as Cryalot) (2023)

=== Singles ===
- "Wherever You Go" (with Augustus) (2013)
- "Fly Away" (with Sakura Rainbow) (2014)
- "1Up" (with Oscar Scheller) (2019)
- "Nijiiro Waaludo" (with Mnst.) (2020)
- "Ringtone (Remix)" (with 100 Gecs, Charli XCX, and Rico Nasty) (2021)
- "The Darkness (Remix)" (with A. G. Cook and Hannah Diamond) (2021)
- "Airport Dreams" (with Holy Fuck) (2021)
- "Hell Is Here" (as Cryalot) (2022)
- "Touch the Sun" (as Cryalot) (2022)
- "Labyrinth" (as Cryalot) (2022)
- "Gemmy Juice" (with Neggy Gemmy) (2022)
- "See Her" (as Cryalot) (2023)
