= Civilisation I =

EP by Kero Kero Bonito
- Released: 30 September 2019
- Studio: Anthony Lim at Premier Mastering
- Length: 12:39
- Label: Polyvinyl
- Producer: Gus Lobban

Kero Kero Bonito chronology
Time 'n' Place (2018)	Civilisation I (2019)	Civilisation II (2021)

Singles from Civilisation I
- 1. "When the Fires Come" Released: 9 September 2019

Civilisation I is the fourth extended play (EP) by British band Kero Kero Bonito. It was released on 30 September 2019, shortly after the single "When the Fires Come". In a press release for its sequel EP, Civilisation II, the band describes the EP as a concept album, where they "envisioned a historically-ambiguous alternate-reality". The EP marks another change in terms of the band's musical style; eschewing many of the guitar-driven shoegaze influences of TOTEP and Time 'n' Place, instead drawing heavily on synth-pop and dream pop. Lyrically, the EP explores concepts of society, war, religion, and environmentalism. The band released a follow-up to the EP on 21 April 2021. Both EPs along with an additional track, "Gateway", were merged into a compilation album, titled simply Civilisation and released on 10 September 2021.

== Reception ==
Tom Breihan from Stereogum says that the EP is "cold and measured, [with] lyrics that tell a story about a corrupt government holding its population in thrall and about the need to fight back". Noting that the record could be about the future following what happens after climate change, Dean Brandt of Flood Magazine said "If Time 'n' Place was about mixing up adolescent nostalgia, contemporary millennial malaise, and the daunting near future, Civilisation I blows up that timeline to cover the ancient past of primitive man".

== Track listing ==
Civilisation I track listing
No.	Title	Writer(s)	Length
1.	"Battle Lines"	Douglas Lobban	4:19
2.	"When the Fires Come"	Lobban; Jamie Bulled	3:40
3.	"The River"	Lobban; Bulled; Sarah Perry	4:40
Total length:			12:39
