= Jay Som =

American singer-songwriter (born 1994)

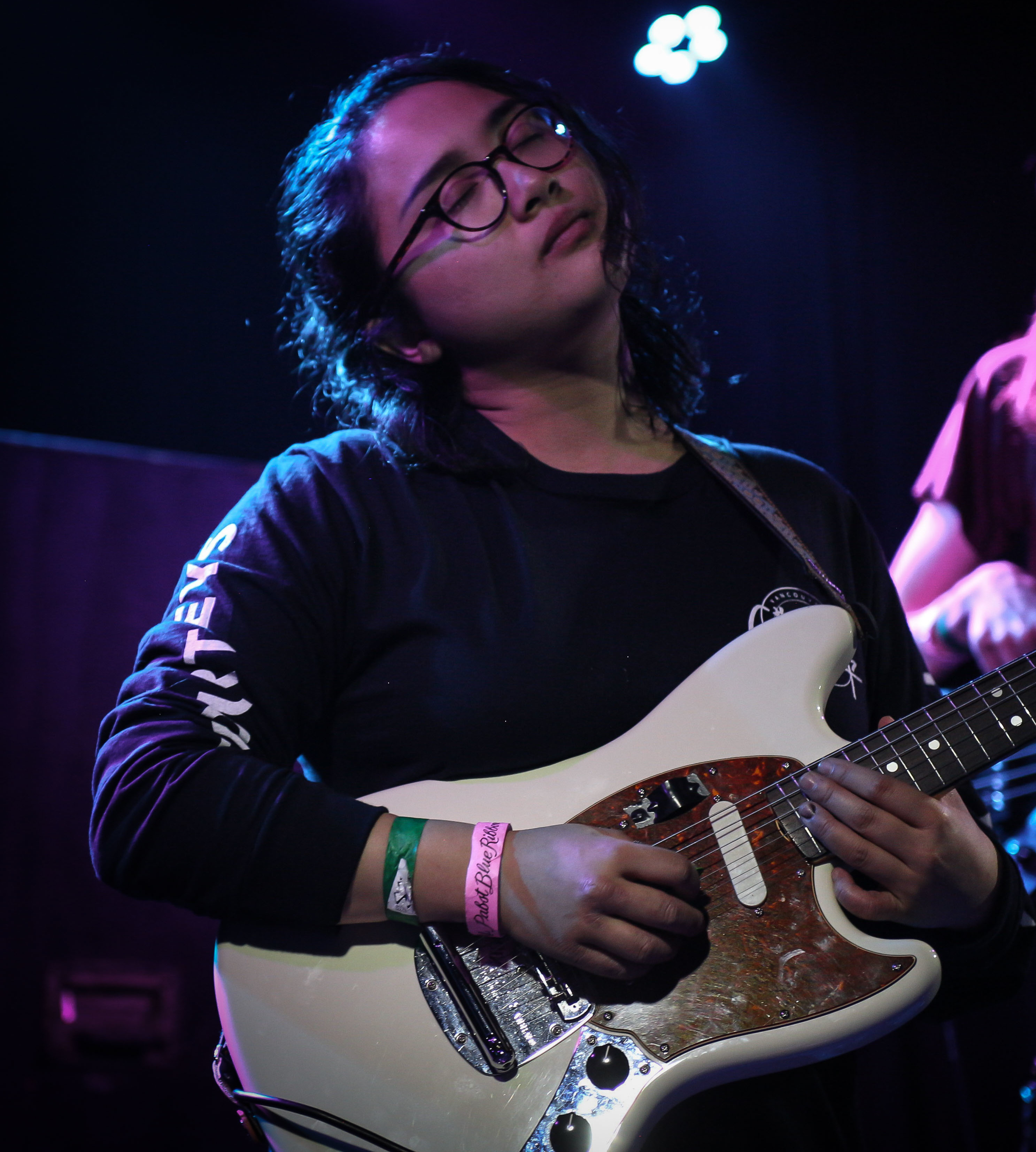
- Duterte in March 2017

Background information
- Born: Melina Mae Cortez Duterte; 1994 (age 31–32); Walnut Creek, California, U.S.
- Genres: Bedroom pop; dream pop; indie rock; indie pop
- Instruments: Vocals; guitar; bass
- Years active: 2012–present
- Labels: Polyvinyl; Topshelf; Double Denim; Dead Oceans; Fat Possum Records
- Spinoffs: Routine, Bachelor
- Website: www.jaysommusic.com

Melina Mae Cortez Duterte (born 1994), better known by her stage name Jay Som, is an American singer-songwriter, multi-instrumentalist, producer and mixing engineer. Pursuing an indie rock sound, she released her debut studio album Turn Into in mid-2016, followed by Everybody Works in 2017, Anak Ko in 2019, and Belong in 2025.

Born in Walnut Creek, California, Duterte spent her childhood in Pleasanton and Brentwood. She grew up playing the trumpet and guitar, and began writing and recording music at the age of 12. She originally intended to attend a conservatory program for jazz but instead decided to focus on songwriting. Jay Som has toured with Boygenius and released music with Palehound's Ellen Kempner under the band name Bachelor.

== Early life ==
Melina Mae Cortez Duterte was born in 1994 in Walnut Creek, California, to Filipino immigrant parents, and was raised in Pleasanton and Brentwood. She often cites her parents' immigrant background and cultural customs as major influences. She came out as queer when she was around 12 years old.

Duterte grew up playing the trumpet and guitar, and began writing and recording music at the age of 12. She originally intended to attend a conservatory program for jazz but instead decided to focus on songwriting. After enrolling in community college and studying music production and recording, she began recording in her bedroom studio and self-released music under the moniker Jay Som, which was created from an online baby name generator and means "Victory Moon".

== Career ==
In November 2015, Duterte released nine tracks on her Bandcamp page under the name Untitled. They began to receive attention online despite the fact that they were intended to be demos, and were eventually re-released twice as Turn Into which was recorded in her bedroom for around three weeks. First under Topshelf Records and then Polyvinyl Records in 2016. Following Turn Into, Duterte opened for Peter Bjorn and John, Mitski and Japanese Breakfast. Duterte's first proper album as Jay Som, Everybody Works, was released March 10, 2017, under Polyvinyl and Double Denim Records. It was preceded by the song "1 Billion Dogs" in February. Everybody Works had landed on Best of 2017 lists from multiple music publications, including Pitchfork, Exclaim!, and Billboard. Duterte said at the time that the album's sound was influenced by Tame Impala, Yo La Tengo, the Pixies and Carly Rae Jepsen's E•MO•TION.

In January 2018, Duterte released "Pirouette" and "O.K., Meet Me Underwater," singles that were recorded during the same sessions as Everybody Works but did not end up on the final tracklist. In July 2018, Duterte toured with Paramore, and was their opening act. In September of the same year, Duterte released a split EP Nothing's Changed with American singer-songwriter Justus Proffit. The EP consists of 5 tracks, all recorded in her home recording studio—where she also recorded Everybody Works.

The follow-up to Everybody Works, Anak Ko, was released on August 23, 2019, via Polyvinyl. In January 2020, Duterte contributed to a benefit compilation in support of Bernie Sanders's 2020 presidential run. Organized by indie rock band Strange Ranger, the compilation was titled Bernie Speaks With the Community. On October 28, 2020, Duterte announced a new project, Routine, with Chastity Belt bassist Annie Truscott by releasing their first single, "Cady Road". Routine's debut EP And Other Things was released on November 20 via Friends Of/Dead Oceans. Duterte released a collaborative album under the moniker of Bachelor with Palehound's Ellen Kempner in May 2021, entitled Doomin Sun.

In 2023, Duterte toured with Boygenius for their debut album The Record, playing bass in their touring band. That same year, Duterte also produced the album Doom Singer for Chris Farren. Two years later, on July 9, 2025, Duterte announced new LP Belong, her first new album in six years. The album featured contributions from Paramore's Hayley Williams, Jimmy Eat World's Jim Adkins and Mini Trees.

== Artistry ==
Duterte performs all the music on her recordings, and records in a makeshift studio in her bedroom. She describes her style as "headphone music". Joe Coscarelli of The New York Times described Jay Som's music as "D.I.Y. bedroom pop" and noted its intimate, lo-fi aesthetic. Liz Pelly of Time Out New York called her sound "mesmerizing and multidimensional dream pop that favors reality over escapism, drawing from classic pop and funk". Pelly also described Duterte's singing as "low and languid". Pitchfork has compared Jay Som's intimate sound and vulnerability to the music of Phil Elverum and Carly Rae Jepsen, and Duterte has stated that Elverum's music has had a profound impact on her own. Karaoke singing and listening to Yo La Tengo and My Bloody Valentine also have influenced Duterte's vocal style. Duterte was influenced by American rock band Jimmy Eat World's fourth studio album Bleed American (2001). She has also cited taking influence from Canadian singer-songwriter and record producer, Alanis Morissette.

== Discography ==
Studio albums

- Turn Into (2016)
- Everybody Works (2017)
- Anak Ko (2019)
- Belong (2025)
