= Belong (Jay Som album) =

Studio album by Jay Som
- Released: October 10, 2025
- Genre: Indie; rock
- Length: 33:52
- Label: Polyvinyl
- Producer: Melina Duterte; Joao Gonzalez; Mal Hauser; Steph Marziano; Kyle Pulley

Jay Som chronology
Anak Ko (2019)	Belong (2025)

Singles from Belong
- 1. "Float" Released: July 9, 2025; 2. "A Million Reasons Why" Released: July 9, 2025; 3. "Card on the Table" Released: August 12, 2025; 4. "What You Need" Released: September 9, 2025; 5. "Past Lives" Released: October 7, 2025

Belong is the fourth studio album by the American indie musician Jay Som. It was released through Polyvinyl Record Co., on October 10, 2025. It is her first release of new material in 6 years since the release of Anak Ko in 2019. Duterte began recording the album in her home studio in Los Angeles. The album was supported and promoted with the singles "Float", "A Million Reasons Why", "Card on the Table", "What You Need", and "Past Lives". The album received generally favourable reviews from contemporary music critics.

== Background and release ==
Melina Duterte a.k.a. Jay Som had begun recording her fourth studio album. She recorded the album in her home studio in Los Angeles. Duterte wrote the album with the mindset of "searching for her place in the world", and had also come up with the album's title. Duterte officially announced the album on July 9, 2025, with the release of two singles, "Float" and "A Million Reasons Why". Duterte later released "Card on the Table", with Mini Trees, on August 12, 2025. On September 9, 2025, she released "What You Need", with Soft Glas, as a single. She released "Past Lives", featuring Hayley Williams, as a single on October 7, 2025.

== Critical reception ==
Professional ratings
Aggregate scores
Source	Rating
Metacritic	80/100
Review scores
Source	Rating
AllMusic	3.5/5 stars
Beats Per Minute	80%
Clash	8/10
DIY	4.5/5 stars
Exclaim!	8/10
The Line of Best Fit	7/10
PopMatters	8/10
The Skinny	4/5 stars
Pitchfork	7.5/10

Belong had received generally positive reviews from music critics. At Metacritic, which assigns a normalised rating out of 100 to reviews from mainstream critics, the album received an average score of 80, indicating "generally favourable reviews".

Katherine St. Asaph from Pitchfork wrote that the album's arrangements were "pop-punk at bedroom-pop scale: fist-pumping in a small space". While Beats Per Minute's reviewer Chase McMullen said the "unending sense of burden looming", that he felt was present across the album, "nimbly flits between stylistic leanings, rather than diving too completely into [do it louder]". John Amen of The Line of Best Fit wrote that the album had represented a shift for Duterte. PopMatters' writer Christopher Laird had said it sounded like a "product of a person who spent years working on their craft". Dylan Barnabe from Exclaim! felt Jay Som "weaves emotive soundscapes entirely by design" with Belong.

Rhys Morgan of The Skinny said the album constantly "oscillates", switching between different textures "underscoring [this] surrender of control". Sarah Jamieson from DIY perceived it as "a rich, fulfilling album packed with nuance and reflection". While Clash's editor Robin Murray wrote that Belong had an "easy-on-ear feel that [is] combined to a rich audio quality". AllMusic's Marcy Donelson said the album had "skillful mix of angsty and dreamy textures".

== Track listing ==
No.	Title	Writer(s)	Producer(s)	Length
1.	"Cards on the Table" (with Mini Trees)	Melina Duterte; Mal Hauser	Duterte; Joao Gonzalez; Hauser; Kyle Pulley	3:33
2.	"Float" (featuring Jim Adkins)	Duterte	Duterte; Gonzalez; Hauser; Pulley	3:27
3.	"What You Need" (with Soft Glas)	Duterte; Joao Gonzalez; Hauser	Duterte; Gonzalez	3:50
4.	"Appointments"	Duterte	Duterte	3:57
5.	"Drop A"	Duterte; Gonzalez	Duterte; Gonzalez	3:04
6.	"Past Lives" (featuring Hayley Williams)	Duterte; Hauser; Steph Marziano	Duterte; Gonzalez; Hauser; Marziano; Pulley	2:57
7.	"D.H."	Duterte; Gonzalez	Duterte; Gonzalez	2:52
8.	"Casino Stars"	Duterte; Hauser; Marziano	Duterte; Hauser; Marziano; Pulley	2:33
9.	"Meander/Sprouting Wings"	Duterte	Dutarte	1:56
10.	"A Million Reasons Why"	Duterte; Marziano	Duterte; Hauser; Marziano	1:31
11.	"Want It All"	Duterte; Gonzalez	Duterte; Gonzalez	4:12
Total length:				33:52

== Personnel ==
Credits adapted from Tidal.

- Melina Duterte – vocals, bass, guitar, mixing, engineering (all tracks); synthesizer (tracks 1–4, 9, 11), drum machine (1, 2), acoustic guitar (1), piano (2, 4–6, 8), trumpet (4), sampler (5, 9–11); drums, organ (8)
- Joao Gonzalez – acoustic guitar (1, 9), electric guitar (2, 5, 6, 8), drums (3, 4, 7, 11), guitar (3, 4, 7), piano (3, 4, 9, 11), engineering (3), synthesizer (5, 8), sampler (5), vocals (8), Mellotron (11)
- Kyle Pulley – mixing (1–3, 6–8, 11), bass (1, 2, 5, 6, 8), engineering (1, 2, 6–8)
- Danny Murillo – drums (1, 4)
- Mal Hauser – guitar (1, 5, 6, 8); baritone guitar, bass (2); piano (4, 8), electric guitar (4)
- Johanna Baumann – engineering (1, 8), engineering assistance (2, 6)
- Eli Glovas-Kurtz – engineering assistance (1, 2, 6, 8)
- Meredith Glover – engineering assistance (1, 2, 6, 8)
- Theo Cobb – engineering assistance (1, 2, 6, 8)
- Lexi Vega – vocals (1)
- Madden Klass – drums (2, 4–6, 8), engineering (5)
- Jim Adkins – vocals (2)
- Matthew Benthall – production assistance (3)
- Hayley Williams – vocals (6)
- Steph Marziano – drum machine, engineering (10)
