= Meishi Smile =

American band

- Origin: Los Angeles, California, U.S.
- Genres: Electronic; indie pop
- Years active: 2011–present
- Labels: Zoom Lens; Meta Physica
- Members: Faye Yim; Jason; Zachary Roy
- Website: meishismile.org

Meishi Smile is a Los Angeles based band formed by producer, vocalist, and songwriter Faye Yim. The name Meishi Smile was first used in 2010. The project has elements of noise music, J-pop and shoegaze.

== Career ==
In 2014, the first Meishi Smile album, LUST, was released on Attack The Music and Zoom Lens. Later that year, Yim released a new single called Star on Maltine Records.

In January 2015, Yim debuted their first video on national television on Adult Swim with the video "AJS".

On May 21, 2015, Yim announced through an interview with The Fader that they were working on a forthcoming album entitled ...Belong.

On May 28, 2015, Yim premiered a new single entitled Breathe.

In 2020, the music project led formerly only by Yim was announced to have turned into a band. Yim is the vocalist, songwriter, producer, and visual artist for Meishi Smile.

== Discography ==
=== Studio albums (as Meishi Smile) ===
Year	Album title	Release details
2012	LUST	Released: September 22, 2012; Label: Orchid Tapes, Zoom Lens; Format: Digital, cassette
2014	LUST (reissue)	Released: January 28, 2014; Label: Attack The Music, Zoom Lens; Format: CD, vinyl, digital
2015	...Belong	Released: October 6, 2015; Label: Zoom Lens; Format: CD, vinyl, digital
2021	Ressentiment	Released: May 14, 2021; Label: Zoom Lens; Format: CD, vinyl, digital
TBA	Limerence	Released: TBA; Label: TBA; Format: TBA

=== Extended plays (as Meishi Smile) ===
Year	Album title	Release details
2013	mYSTERIOUS sUMMER vACATION	Released: February 23, 2013; Label: Zoom Lens; Format: Digital
2016	(reclamation)	Released: May 27, 2016; Label: Zoom Lens; Format: Digital

=== Singles ===
Year	Single title	Release details
2011	"SYNTHETIC GIRL"	Released: 2011; Label: Zoom Lens; Format: Digital
2014	"STAR"	Released: October 11, 2014; Label: Maltine Records / sKILLupper; Format: Digital
2015	"Blank Ocean"	Released: January 13, 2015; Label: Secret Songs; Format: Digital
2015	"Breathe"	Released: May 28, 2015; Label: Zoom Lens; Format: Digital

=== Digital albums ===
- May 2020: 【E T H E R 0 1】
- Oct 2020: Hate Floods Slow
- Dec 2020: Flowers (Under All My Shadows)
- Sept 2021: All The Joy of Your Happy Songs
- Nov 2021: Love, In The Time of Virus

=== Compilations ===
- 2012: Nothin’ Compares Compilation (Orchid Tapes) - track "Pale (Alternative Version)"
- 2013: ANGELTOWN Showcase Compilation (Orchid Tapes) - track "Us"
- 2014: Boring Ecstasy: The Bedroom Pop of Orchid Tapes (Orchid Tapes) - track "Sincerity"

== See also ==
- Zoom Lens (record label)
- Orchid Tapes
