= Intro Bonito =

Mixtape by Kero Kero Bonito
- Released: 30 September 2013 (SoundCloud); 25 August 2014 (reissue)
- Genres: Hyperpop; hip hop; dance; 8-bit
- Length: 30:17
- Languages: English; Japanese
- Labels: Self-released; Double Denim (re-issue); Magniph (Japanese release)
- Producers: Jamie Bulled; Gus Lobban

Kero Kero Bonito chronology
Intro Bonito (2013)	Bonito Generation (2016)

Singles from Intro Bonito
- 1. "Homework" Released: 20 July 2013; 2. "Sick Beat" Released: 12 August 2014

Intro Bonito is the debut mixtape by British indie pop band Kero Kero Bonito. It was self-released by the band on 30 September 2013, followed by a reissue on 25 August 2014 by Double Denim Records. It was promoted by the singles "Homework" and "Sick Beat" and the title track received a music video. A remix EP called Bonito Recycling was released on 29 September 2014.

The song "I'd Rather Sleep" went viral on TikTok in 2020 and is used as a trend for the creepypasta the Backrooms on YouTube. Intro Bonito was listed as the 46th best album of the 2010s by Gorilla vs. Bear.

== Composition ==
Many of the songs featured on the mixtape were written with a Casio SA-46 mini-keyboard. The song "Sick Beat" is about "kicking someone's arse on a computer game" and contains elements of dancehall, hip hop, J-pop, and '90s club music. The album's lyrical themes touch on "concise, pop-haiku-like explorations of the strangeness of babies, ecological issues or societal expectations of women" sung in playground chant-like melodies.

== Release ==
Intro Bonito was originally self-released by the band via Bandcamp. Double Denim Records eventually reached out and inquired if the label could re-issue the mixtape on CD, which never came to pass. Intro Bonito was also re-issued in Japan by the label Magniph. In 2023, it was announced that the band's current label Polyvinyl would reissue Intro Bonito on CD, vinyl and cassette, containing several bonus tracks. This reissue was released on April 28, 2023.

== Track listing ==
All tracks are written by Sarah Bonito.

Intro Bonito – Standard edition
No.	Title	Length
1.	"Bonito Intro"	0:50
2.	"Intro Bonito"	2:45
3.	"Sick Beat"	2:59
4.	"My Party"	2:47
5.	"Cat Vs. Dog" (English version)	0:58
6.	"Kero Kero Bonito"	2:36
7.	"Babies (Are So Strange)"	2:36
8.	"Bonito Jingle"	0:18
9.	"Homework"	2:17
10.	"Pocket Crocodile"	1:55
11.	"Cat Vs. Dog" (Japanese version)	0:58
12.	"Park Song"	2:45
13.	"Let's Go to the Forest"	2:03
14.	"Small Town"	2:46
15.	"I'd Rather Sleep"	1:55
Total length:		30:17

Intro Bonito – 2023 CD reissue
No.	Title	Length
16.	"Bonito Shopping"	1:18
17.	"Fans (Are So Cool)"	3:42
18.	"Flamingo"	3:17
19.	"Build It Up"	3:09
20.	"Chicken"	2:26
21.	"My Party" (bo en Remix)	3:49
22.	"Sick Beat" (Danny L Harle Remix)	3:03
23.	"I'd Rather Sleep" (et aliae Remix)	3:03
24.	"Cat vs. Dog" (Kane West Remix)	3:34
25.	"Pocket Crocodile" (Toby Gale Remix)	4:52
26.	"Small Town" (Spazzkid Remix)	3:23
27.	"Flamingo" (Julien Mier Remix)	3:16
28.	"Flamingo" (English version)	3:18

== Charts ==
Chart performance for Intro Bonito
Chart (2023)	Peak position
US Top Album Sales (Billboard)	42
