= Anak Ko =

Studio album by Jay Som
- Released: August 23, 2019
- Length: 34:21
- Label: Polyvinyl
- Producer: Melina Duterte

Jay Som chronology
Everybody Works (2017)	Anak Ko (2019)	Belong (2025)

Singles from Anak Ko
- 1. "Superbike" Released: June 4, 2019; 2. "Tenderness" Released: July 11, 2019; 3. "Nighttime Drive" Released: August 8, 2019

Anak Ko (Note: Tagalog: Anak Ko lit. "My Child") is the third studio album by American indie musician Jay Som, released on August 23, 2019 through Polyvinyl.

== Background and release ==
Anak Ko was announced on June 4, 2019, the same day the album's first single "Superbike" was released. Tour dates and pre-orders for the album were also made available. "Tenderness" was released as the album's second single on July 11, 2019, alongside a music video directed by Weird Life. "Nighttime Drive" was released as the album's third and final single on August 8, 2019, alongside a music video directed by Han Hale depicting Duterte and her band investigating alien life forms.

== Critical reception ==
Professional ratings
Aggregate scores
Source	Rating
AnyDecentMusic?	7.8/10
Metacritic	82/100
Review scores
Source	Rating
AllMusic	4/5 stars
Consequence of Sound	B+
DIY	4.5/5 stars
Exclaim!	8/10
NME	4/5 stars
The Observer	4/5 stars
Pitchfork	7.3/10
PopMatters	8/10
Rolling Stone	3.5/5 stars
Slant Magazine	3.5/5 stars

Anak Ko received universal acclaim from music critics. At Metacritic, which assigns a normalised rating out of 100 to reviews from mainstream publications, the album received an average score of 82, based on nineteen reviews.

=== Accolades ===
Publication	Accolade	Rank	Ref.
Consequence of Sound	Top 50 Albums of 2019	35	

== Track listing ==
Credits adapted from iTunes. All tracks written and produced by Melina Duterte.

No.	Title	Length
1.	"If You Want It"	3:13
2.	"Superbike"	3:53
3.	"Peace Out"	4:16
4.	"Devotion"	3:32
5.	"Nighttime Drive"	3:13
6.	"Tenderness"	4:01
7.	"Anak Ko"	3:38
8.	"Crown"	4:38
9.	"Get Well"	3:57
Total length:		34:21

== Personnel ==
Credits adapted from the liner notes of Anak Ko.

- Melina Duterte – vocals, instruments, recording, mixing
- Zachary Elsasser – drums (tracks 2, 4, 6, 8)
- Justus Proffit – drums (tracks 3, 9), vocals (track 3)
- Oliver Pinnell – guitar (tracks 2, 7, 8), vocals (tracks 3, 4)
- Taylor Vick – vocals (tracks 2, 3, 5, 6)
- Laetitia Tamko – vocals (tracks 3, 4)
- Dylan Allard – vocals (tracks 3, 4, 7)
- Annie Truscott – violin (track 5), guitar (track 9), vocals (track 9)
- Nicholas Merz – pedal steel (track 9)
- Heba Kadry – mastering
- María Medem – artwork
- Tim Reynolds - layout
