= Hell Is Here (song) =

Single by Cryalot

from the EP Icarus
- Released: 30 June 2022
- Genre: Post-industrial; black metal
- Length: 2:24
- Label: AWAL
- Songwriters: Sarah Midori Perry; Jennifer Walton
- Producer: Walton

Cryalot singles chronology
"Hell Is Here" (2022)	"Touch the Sun" (2022)

Music video
- Hell Is Here on YouTube

"Hell Is Here" is the debut single by Cryalot, a solo project of Kero Kero Bonito vocalist Sarah Midori Perry. It was released on 30 June 2022 by AWAL as the lead single from her debut solo EP Icarus. The song was produced by former Kero Kero Bonito touring drummer Jennifer Walton, and was released alongside a music video directed by Joshua Homer.

== Background and style ==
In a statement, Perry said that the song "is about defeat; it depicts the part of the Icarus story after he descends into the sea" and that it "explores this feeling of despair and powerlessness. Our world can twist so suddenly into a place where our reasons to live bring us no joy anymore. Nothing is the same... and it won't be the same again. Hell is not below us, it's here."

Per BroadwayWorld's Michael Major, "Hell Is Here" "draws from certain aesthetics of black metal with synths that evolve into warped guitars and Sarah's screams echoing powerfully through the track." Major writes that Perry "wrote the lyrics during a dark period in her life, harnessing the feelings of the remote reality she was stuck in." The Fader's Raphael Helfand notes that on the song, Perry is "alternately tranquil and possessed, balancing her bubbly KKB persona with something far more sinister." She repeats the lyrics "Crystallize the pain / Nothing is the same / Hell is here / Hell is here to stay" throughout the track, "sounding scarier and scarier until the first line explodes into a guttural black metal scream about halfway through." Walton's post-industrial production "takes the track into even trippier territory" with an instrumental which "seethes like an [sic] wounded beast beneath the demonic bits and gurgles out its dying breaths during the angelic ones, only to rise from the ashes angrier than ever each time the chorus returns."

== Music video ==
The music video for "Hell Is Here" was released the same day as the single and was directed by Joshua Homer. Per an interview with The Fader's Raphael Helfand, Perry was "inspired by how claustrophobic artists' studios look, especially Francis Bacon's", saying "there's something really scary about them" and she "wanted to recreate an art studio and fill it up with all the paintings and sketches I've been holding onto for years. It's all my personal work." Perry and her mom made custom wings as part of her costume for the video which were made of pampas grass "kindly donated" by her neighbor.
