= Turn Into (album) =

Studio album by Jay Som
- Released: July 22, 2016
- Recorded: March 2014 – October 2015
- Studio: Jay Som's bedroom (aka EMA Studios)
- Genres: Bedroom pop; dream pop
- Length: 32:54
- Labels: Double Denim; Polyvinyl
- Producer: Melina Duterte

Jay Som chronology
Turn Into (2016)	Everybody Works (2017)

Turn Into is the debut studio album by American singer-songwriter and multi-instrumentalist Jay Som. It was originally released through Topshelf Records, later releasing on July 22, 2016 through Polyvinyl. The album was recorded in her bedroom from March 2014 to October 2015. Consisting of nine tracks and a duration of around thirty-two minutes, it was entirely written and produced by Duterte.

== Background and recording ==
After writing and sharing songs for a number of years under various pseudonyms dating back to middle school, multi-instrumentalist Melina Duterte a.k.a. Jay Som, had revealed a "collection of finished and unfinished songs" in October 2015. Duterte wrote, performed, recorded, and mixed all the songs by herself in her bedroom. Which by her account were somewhat randomly selected from about three years of material, and would get her a record deal with Polyvinyl. It would later be released through the aforementioned label. The album also is classified as an indie rock record.

== Critical reception ==
Professional ratings
Review scores
Source	Rating
AllMusic	3/5 stars
Pitchfork	8.2/10
PopMatters	8/10

Marcy Donelson of AllMusic felt that the album was "likely to appeal to admirers of similarly discovered lo-fi artists like Alex G and Elvis Depressedly, Turn Into marks Jay Som as an act to watch for fans of the style." and gave it a 3 out of 5 stars. While Pitchfork's Quinn Moreland called it "a kaleidoscopic collection of dream pop touching on multiple moods." Christopher Laird for PopMatters felt Som's voice layers were "exciting, tones are quirky, and the melodies are creative. From beginning to end, guitar parts pop out of nowhere to announce a chorus or to explode into a bombastic finale."

== Track listing ==
All tracks are written by Melina Duterte.

No.	Title	Length
1.	"Peach Boy"	3:13
2.	"Ghost"	3:07
3.	"Next to Me"	3:38
4.	"Drown"	2:52
5.	"Our Red Door"	3:55
6.	"Unlimited Touch"	4:05
7.	"Why I Say No"	4:40
8.	"Slow"	4:01
9.	"Turn Into"	3:23
Total length:		32:54
