= Civilisation II =

EP by Kero Kero Bonito
- Released: 21 April 2021
- Genres: Dream pop; synth-pop; hyperpop; futurepop; glitch pop; art pop; indie pop
- Length: 14:01
- Label: Polyvinyl
- Producer: Gus Lobban

Kero Kero Bonito chronology
Civilisation I (2019)	Civilisation II (2021)	Civilisation (2021)

Singles from Civilisation II
- 1. "The Princess and the Clock" Released: 24 February 2021; 2. "21/04/20" Released: 21 April 2021

Civilisation II is the fifth extended play (EP) by British indie pop band Kero Kero Bonito, released on 21 April 2021 by Polyvinyl. The follow-up to 2019's Civilisation I EP, Civilisation II was preceded by the single "The Princess and the Clock" on 24 February 2021.

In a press release, Kero Kero Bonito described Civilisation II as a continuation of the ideas presented on Civilisation I, where they "explore instinctive human tendencies across three tracks, all completely devised using vintage hardware". Both EPs along with an additional track, "Gateway", were merged into a compilation album, titled simply Civilisation and released on 10 September 2021.

== Background ==
The prequel EP Civilisation I, released on 30 September 2019, was originally meant to be a stand alone project four tracks in length, named Civilisation, to build upon the themes of their second album Time 'n' Place for their 2019 tour, but was shortened to three tracks, and split into two projects. The continuation, Civilisation II, was originally meant to be released in 2020, but was pushed back to 2021 because of the COVID-19 pandemic.

== Release and promotion ==
Kero Kero Bonito announced the EP on 24 February 2021, along with releasing the single "The Princess and the Clock" with an accompanying music video to their YouTube channel. The EP was released via Polyvinyl on 21 April 2021, along with the single "21/04/20" being uploaded to their YouTube channel.

== Composition ==
Civilisation II has been described as a dream pop, synth-pop, hyperpop, futurepop, glitch pop, art pop, and indie pop record. The production of the EP was done with a Korg DSS-1 sampler and consisted a mix of vintage synths and evocative lyrics with a dreamy arrangement. Kero Kero Bonito has also cited that the three tracks of the record, like Civilisation I, also represents three different tenses: past, present, and future.

=== Songs ===
Civilisation II opens with the bubblegum, synth-pop, experimental pop, and hyperpop track "Princess and the Clock". The song represents "past", lyrically tells about "a kidnapped protagonist being trapped in a chamber" with a chiptune influence on the production. The second track representing "present", "21/04/20" is an indie pop song with a "futuristic vibe". Lyricisms of the track has been described as "ambling and diaristic" about reflections on lockdown of the previous year through a fable style, and has been likened as a sequel to "Visiting Hours". The record closes with the synth-funk, electro, glitch pop, and techno track "Well Rested", a remix of the song "Rest Stop". Noted as the "most experimental cut on the EP", the beat of the track has been characterised as "between vaporwave and acid house". The song represents "future", it features lyricisms about an environmental collapse about "envisioning a transhumanist future as humanity evolves into new forms".

== Reception ==
Professional ratings
Aggregate scores
Source	Rating
Metacritic	82/100
Review scores
Source	Rating
DIY	4/5 stars
Dork	4/5 stars
NME	4/5 stars
Pitchfork	7.5/10
Under the Radar	8.5/10 stars

Civilisation II was met with positive reviews upon release. At Metacritic, which assigns a normalised rating out of 100 based on reviews from mainstream critics, the album received a score of 82 out of 100, based on reviews from five critics, indicating "universal acclaim".

Shaad D'Souza from Pitchfork described the EP as "focusing on the emotional toll of disaster with ingenuity, wit, and a warm, bright sound" in contrast to Civilisation I's "nightmarish visions of perpetual war and wildfire smoke". They also noted that it "meditates not on human decline as much as the fables and myths we create in order to adjust to it." Martyn Young of Dork states that the EP "represent[s] the multi-faceted joy of a band who can do it all". Jeff Cubbison of Impose called the track "The Princess and the Clock" an "explosive experimental synth pop anthem", describing it as a "shimmering and poignant dark-fairytale." Joe Vitagliano of American Songwriter named the EP one of the "best" releases from the first half of 2021, writing that "the eclectic mix of vintage synths, evocative lyrics and dreamy arrangements comes together to form something truly sublime."

Kate Elridge from Riot on the other hand described the EP as "less cohesive" than Civilisation I, and while having a "promising start", remarking that the three tracks are "separate and unrelated", making the EP feel "disorganised and incomplete".

== Track listing ==
Civilisation II track listing
No.	Title	Writer(s)	Length
1.	"The Princess and the Clock"	Douglas Lobban	3:49
2.	"21/04/20"	Lobban	3:02
3.	"Well Rested"	Lobban; Sarah Perry	7:10
Total length:			14:01
