= Time 'n' Place =

Studio album by Kero Kero Bonito
- Released: 1 October 2018
- Recorded: 2017–2018
- Studios: Press Play, Bermondsey; Gus' room, Bromley
- Genres: Indie rock; noise; shoegaze; dream pop; experimental pop; synth-pop
- Length: 32:53
- Label: Polyvinyl
- Producer: Gus Lobban

Kero Kero Bonito chronology
TOTEP (2018)	Time 'n' Place (2018)	Civilisation I (2019)

Singles from Time 'n' Place
- 1. "Only Acting" Released: 12 February 2018; 2. "Time Today" Released: 8 May 2018; 3. "Make Believe" Released: 17 September 2018; 4. "Swimming" Released: 25 February 2019

Time 'n' Place is the second studio album by British indie pop band Kero Kero Bonito, released on 1 October 2018 through Polyvinyl Record Co in North America and self-released worldwide. It is their first album released under Polyvinyl. Produced by the band's multi-instrumentalist Gus Lobban, it includes the previously released singles "Only Acting" (which was also featured on their TOTEP), "Time Today", and "Make Believe". Musically, the album marks a stylistic departure from the band's previous electronic musical efforts, showcasing a mix of indie rock, noise, shoegaze, dream pop, experimental pop, and synth-pop musical styles.

== Background ==
The album represents a departure from the band's sound showcased in their debut album, Bonito Generation. During the tour of the album, the band played in Jakarta, Indonesia, where, in producer and drummer Gus Lobban's words, "the band experienced things we didn't even appreciate existed." After the tour, the band returned to their homes in the suburbs of London, and when the band regrouped they decided to "do whatever the fuck we want." Moreover, after Lobban heard the album Beyond the Fleeting Gales by the indie rock band Crying, he was inspired to start creating music with drums and guitars again, as he felt that album seamlessly combined Kero Kero Bonito's various influences with modern indie rock. Jamie Bulled and Lobban began to play on the instruments they first learned music on (bass guitar and drums, respectively), and Sarah Perry was moved to write lyrics inspired by images recalling her childhood memories following her discovery that her childhood home in Japan had been demolished. Thematically, the album touches on the loss of loved ones, physical objects and environments and loss of innocence. The song "Visiting Hours" features lyrics written by Lobban about his frequent visits to his hospitalised father, and "If I'd Known", written by Lobban and Bulled, was inspired by their frequent indecision. Lobban described the album as being inspired by the suburbs, as well as the physical rather than the virtual. Stylistically, as opposed to the rise of trap music in suburban London, the album's sound is influenced by suburban guitar bands, such as My Bloody Valentine, CSS, Lush and Sweet Trip.

== Critical reception ==
Professional ratings
Aggregate scores
Source	Rating
Metacritic	69/100
Review scores
Source	Rating
AllMusic	3.5/5 stars
Exclaim!	8/10
Pitchfork	6.5/10
PopMatters	6/10

Tshepo Mokoena of Noisey lauded Time 'n' Place, writing, "Somehow, Kero Kero Bonito have managed to squash so many textures of suburbia—inertia, comfort, a content sleepiness, something you want to resist because it's boring as hell—into a new album." She additionally stated that the album "feels like a rebirth" and "like an album about coming into your own as a person, without strictly being an album about adolescence."

Luke Pearson of Exclaim! awarded the album a score of 8 out of 10, writing that "there is nothing on Time 'n' Place that even remotely approaches the mainline sugar-rush of tracks like 'Trampoline' or 'Picture This' [from Bonito Generation] and frankly it's hard not to miss that style," but later stating that "won over you'll be, as long as you keep an open mind, as this is still a KKB album, full of great melodies, kitschy one-off synth flourishes, and amusing lyrical tangents." He concluded by calling it the band's most cohesive album, "with a real ebb and flow, as opposed to 2016's Bonito Generation, which, excellent as it was, sounded more like a collection of singles or SoundCloud posts."

== Track listing ==
All songs written by Gus Lobban except where noted.

No.	Title	Length
1.	"Outside"	1:51
2.	"Time Today"	2:11
3.	"Only Acting"	3:49
4.	"Flyway"	1:58
5.	"Dump"	3:01
6.	"Make Believe" (Lobban, Sarah Midori Perry)	3:27
7.	"Dear Future Self"	2:46
8.	"Visiting Hours"	2:25
9.	"If I'd Known" (Jamie Bulled, Lobban)	2:43
10.	"Sometimes"	2:01
11.	"Swimming"	3:19
12.	"Rest Stop"	3:22
Total length:		32:53

== Personnel ==
Credits adapted from Kero Kero Bonito's and their label's official websites.

Kero Kero Bonito

- Sarah Midori Perry – vocals
- Gus Lobban – drums, keyboards, backing vocals (on "Visiting Hours"), production
- Jamie Bulled – bass, vocals (on "If I'd Known")

Additional musicians

- James Rowland – guitar, noise
- The Parakeets (Cecile Believe, Elaiza Santos & Oscar) – backing vocals
- Jennifer Walton – noise (on "Outside" and "Rest Stop")
- The Sometimes Singers (George, Yasmin, Bo En, Aggie & Oscar) – extra vocals (on "Sometimes")
- Bo En – string arrangement (on "Dear Future Self")
- Cindy Foster & Greta Mutlu – violins (on "Dear Future Self")
- Alex Plant-Smith – cello (on "Dear Future Self")

Technical

- Jimmy Robertson – band recording
- Andy Ramsay – engineering, additional recording
- Anthony Lim – mixing, mastering (at Premier Mastering)

== Charts ==
Chart (2019)	Peak position
US Heatseekers Albums (Billboard)	1
US Independent Albums (Billboard)	6
US Top Album Sales (Billboard)	63
US Vinyl Albums (Billboard)	5

== Release history ==
Region	Date	Label	Format	Ref.
Various	1 October 2018	Polyvinyl	Digital download	
Various	14 December 2018	Polyvinyl	LP; CD	
