= TOTEP =

EP by Kero Kero Bonito
- Released: 20 February 2018
- Recorded: 2017
- Studio: Press Play, Bermondsey; Gus' room, Bromley
- Length: 11:04
- Label: Self-released
- Producer: Gus Lobban

Kero Kero Bonito chronology
Bonito Generation (2016)	TOTEP (2018)	Time 'n' Place (2018)

Singles from TOTEP
- 1. "Only Acting" Released: 12 February 2018

TOTEP (erroneously spelled out on the spine of some physical releases as The One True EP) is the third extended play by British band Kero Kero Bonito, self-released on 20 February 2018. The EP marks a departure from the "sunny" electropop of previous releases in favor of a "grungier, guitar-heavy style, full of crunching distortion and glitched out noise." The EP was preceded by the single "Only Acting", which was later featured on the band's second studio album, Time 'n' Place (2018).

== Critical reception ==
Anna Gace of Spin opined that the songs on the EP "feel a bit sketched-in, but they also suggest that KKB see a future where they're not just cranking out delightfully goofy bubblegum dance-pop." James Rettig of Stereogum wrote, "The new songs cycle through grunge-y, power-poppy, and dreamy, and they're all great and demonstrate the versatility of KKB's sound."

Following the group's signing to Polyvinyl Records, the EP was issued physically for the first time and charted at #6 on the Top Heatseekers chart.

== Track listing ==
All songs written by Gus Lobban.

No.	Title	Length
1.	"The One True Path"	2:55
2.	"Only Acting"	3:49
3.	"You Know How It Is"	2:14
4.	"Cinema"	2:06
Total length:		11:04

== Personnel ==
Credits adapted from Kero Kero Bonito's official website.

Kero Kero Bonito

- Sarah Midori Perry – vocals
- Gus Lobban – drums, production
- Jamie Bulled – bass

Additional musicians

- James Rowland – guitar, noise
- The Parakeets (Cecile Believe, z & Oscar) – backing vocals

Technical

- Jimmy Robertson – recording
- Andy Ramsay – engineering
- Anthony Lim – additional mixing, mastering

== Charts ==
Chart (2019)	Peak position
US Heatseekers Albums (Billboard)	6
US Independent Albums (Billboard)	22
US Vinyl Albums (Billboard)	20
