= Bonito Generation =

Studio album by Kero Kero Bonito
- Released: 21 October 2016
- Genre: Electropop; J-pop; synth-pop
- Length: 36:22
- Language: English; Japanese
- Label: Double Denim; Around the World; Polyvinyl Record Co.
- Producer: Gus Lobban; Jamie Bulled

Kero Kero Bonito chronology
Intro Bonito (2013)	Bonito Generation (2016)	TOTEP (2018)

Singles from Bonito Generation
- 1. "Picture This" Released: 10 March 2015; 2. "Lipslap" Released: 23 February 2016; 3. "Break" Released: 13 June 2016; 4. "Graduation" Released: 23 August 2016; 5. "Trampoline" Released: 26 September 2016; 6. "Fish Bowl" Released: 8 September 2017

Bonito Generation is the debut studio album by British indie pop band Kero Kero Bonito. A follow-up to the 2013 mixtape, Intro Bonito, this album was released via Double Denim Records on 21 October 2016. Bonito Generation produced six singles: "Picture This", "Lipslap", "Break", "Graduation", "Trampoline", and "Fish Bowl" (the song "Forever Summer Holiday", initially released as its own single in 2017, was later included as a bonus track on the Japanese edition of the album). Music videos were created for "Lipslap", "Break", and "Trampoline".

== Production ==
=== Background ===
In 2011, the producers and multi-instrumentalists Gus Lobban and Jamie Bulled posted an advertisement to MixB (an online bulletin board for Japanese expatriates) seeking a musician interested in "Japanese rap". One of the first respondents was Sarah Midori Perry; Lobban and Bulled were intrigued by Perry's artistic background and her fluency in both English and Japanese, and the three agreed to form a band that they dubbed "Kero Kero Bonito". After a string of singles, the group released their debut mixtape, Intro Bonito through Double Denim Records in August 2014.

=== Writing and recording ===
Following the release of Intro Bonito, Kero Kero Bonito began working on their debut studio album, which they intended to release in 2015. The band wanted this release to be "a bit more songwriter-y, rather than just disjointed basslines and riffs", and they had hoped to collaborate with underground pop musicians, such as the producers affiliated with the PC Music art collective. By October of 2015, however, the album had not yet materialized, and the band disclosed to Stereogum journalist James Rettig that they were still "figuring out what kind of statement they wanted to make" with the record.

When conceptualizing the record, the members of Kero Kero Bonito placed great care on ensuring that the recorded had "flow" and that "all the right elements [were] in the right places". In an interview with DIY magazine, Lobban likened this challenge to solving a tiling puzzle: "You start off with a few pieces, and think 'oh that’s the corner', and 'that's this guy's hand', and then as you come up with more things, and end up only needing one more piece that looks kind of like this. It's very much like a jigsaw, actually."

Bonito Generation was completed at the beginning of August 2016, having been in the works for over a year.

== Composition ==
Bonito Generation has been described to be an electropop, J-pop, and synth-pop record, with influences from electro, dancehall, video game music, '90s dance, hip hop, and K-pop. It has also been compared to the hyperpop sounds of PC Music and Sophie. Themes of the record also touch upon Instagram, hearing a catchy song on the radio, trampolines, waking up, childlike perspective upon day-to-day existential crises, and the curiosity of youth.

== Commercial performance ==
Bonito Generation was released on 21 October 2016 by Double Denim Records, whereupon it peaked at number nine on the US World Albums Chart (Billboard). On 12 July 2017, Bonito Generation was released for the Japanese market by the Sony Music Entertainment Japan subsidiary label Around the World. Following the band's signing to Polyvinyl Record Co., Bonito Generation was re-issued on 11 January 2019, whereupon it peaked at number 15 on the US Vinyl Albums Chart (Billboard).

== Critical reception ==
Professional ratings
Aggregate scores
Source	Rating
AnyDecentMusic?	7.4/10
Metacritic	81/100
Review scores
Source	Rating
AllMusic	4/5 stars
Clash	9/10
DIY	4/5 stars
The Guardian	3/5 stars
Tiny Mix Tapes	4.5/5 marks

Bonito Generation was met with positive reviews from critics. At Metacritic, which assigns a weighted average rating out of 100 to reviews from mainstream publications, the release has an average score of 81 based on seven reviews, meaning that it has received "universal acclaim". Fellow music aggregator AnyDecentMusic? likewise gave the album an average score of 7.4/10, based on eight reviews.

Reviewing the album for AllMusic, Heather Phares wrote, "Packed with breezy, witty, should-be hits, Bonito Generation is a winning mix of subversive art and genuine heart." Joe Rivers of Clash stated, "The production is disarmingly joyous and, thanks to a predilection for early '90s dance, some of the tracks here are absolute bangers." Jamie Milton of DIY magazine opined that the band had "perfected the quick fix formula" with the album, which included "a dozen giant would-be singles". While Milton wrote that the album "crams together a bunch of massive singles, melted into a sometimes grating dose of glucose," the review concluded that "that's the compromise for penning twelve monster hits." Milton also complimented the band for not "taking the piss" with the album and instead earnestly embracing their act.

Kate Hutchinson of The Guardian wrote that "Their no-fat nuggets have the hyper-slickness of kawaii J-pop, while harking back to an era (the 90s, obv) when high-concept chart hits were as ubiquitous as boy bands' curtains". However, she noted, "Their songs are best when they stop being so satirically cutesy and zip somewhere else."

== Track listing ==
Bonito Generation track listing
No.	Title	Writer(s)	Length
1.	"Waking Up"	Jamie Bulled; Gus Lobban; Sarah Midori Perry	2:57
2.	"Heard a Song"	Lobban	3:19
3.	"Graduation"	Bulled; Lobban; Perry	3:19
4.	"Fish Bowl"	Lobban; Perry	1:45
5.	"Big City"	Lobban; Perry	2:52
6.	"Break"	Bulled; Lobban; Perry	3:17
7.	"Lipslap"	Bulled; Lobban	3:39
8.	"Try Me"	Bulled; Lobban; Perry	3:29
9.	"Paintbrush"	Lobban; Perry	0:57
10.	"Trampoline"	Bulled; Lobban; Perry	4:03
11.	"Picture This"	Bulled; Lobban; Perry	3:23
12.	"Hey Parents"	Bulled; Lobban; Perry	3:22
Total length:			36:22

Japanese edition bonus tracks
No.	Title	Writer(s)	Length
13.	"Forever Summer Holiday"	Bulled; Lobban; Perry	3:35
14.	"Picture This" (Felicita Remix)	Bulled; Lobban; Perry	2:55
15.	"Fish Bowl" (Frankie Cosmos Remix)	Lobban; Perry	1:44
16.	"Heard a Song" (CFCF Remix)	Lobban	4:05
17.	"Trampoline" (Saint Etienne Remix)	Bulled; Lobban; Perry	3:48
18.	"Lipslap" (Makeness Remix)	Bulled; Lobban	3:57
19.	"Break" (Jonah Baseball Remix)	Bulled; Lobban; Perry	2:24
Total length:			58:50

Japanese deluxe edition bonus DVD
No.	Title	Length
1.	"Break"	3:19
2.	"Lipslap"	4:02
3.	"Trampoline"	3:59
4.	"Forever Summer Holiday"	3:58

== Personnel ==
Credits adapted from the liner notes of Bonito Generation.

Kero Kero Bonito

- Gus Lobban – keyboards, sampler, background vocals, production
- Jamie Bulled – keyboards, sampler, production
- Sarah Midori Perry – vocals

Technical

- Dreamtrak – mixing ("Lipslap", "Picture This")
- Anthony Lim – mastering

== Charts ==
Chart performance for Bonito Generation
Chart (2016)	Peak position
US World Albums (Billboard)	9

Chart performance for re-release of Bonito Generation
Chart (2019)	Peak position
US Vinyl Albums (Billboard)	15

== Release history ==
Country	Date	Format	Label	Catalog no.	Ref.
Europe; US	2016	CD	Double Denim Records	DD028	
Europe; US	2016	Digital download	Not on label		
Japan	2017	CD	Around the World	SRCP-436-7	
Japan	2017	CD	Around the World	SRCP-438	
UK	2018	LP	Not on label		
Worldwide	2019	LP	Polyvinyl Record Co.	PRC-375	
Worldwide	2019	CD	Polyvinyl Record Co.	PRC-375	
Worldwide	2019	Cassette	Polyvinyl Record Co.	PRC-375	
Worldwide	2019	Digital download	Polyvinyl Record Co.	—N/a	
