= Mini Trees =

American indie rock musician

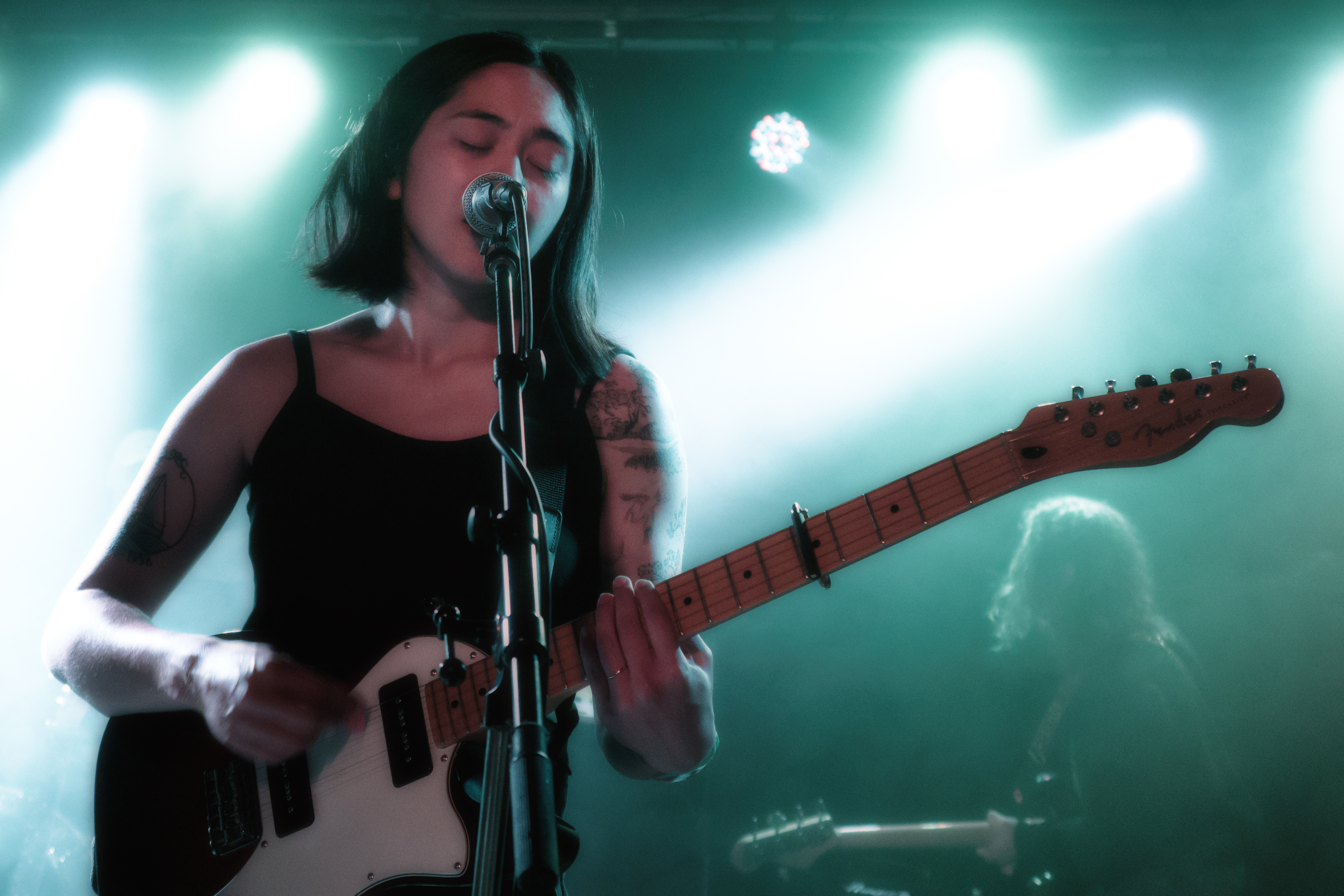
- Vega performing in 2022

Background information
- Genre: Indie rock
- Years active: 2018–present

Lexi Vega, better known by her stage name Mini Trees, is an American indie rock musician based in Los Angeles. She has toured with Julien Baker as well as Death Cab for Cutie, Tasha, Briston Maroney, Hovvdy, and Deep Sea Diver.

== Career ==
Vega began making music as a career in 2018. Vega independently released her debut EP as Mini Trees in 2019 titled Steady Me. Vega independently released her second EP, Slip Away, in June 2020. In April 2021, Vega signed with Boston based record label Run for Cover Records Two months later, Vega announced her debut full-length album, Always In Motion, due out on Run for Cover. The album was released on September 17, 2021.

== Personal life ==
Vega was born in Southern California to a second generation Japanese-American mother and an immigrant father from Cuba. She was raised in the town of La Cañada and currently lives in Torrance. Vega's father died when she was five years old.

Both of Vega's parents had worked in the music industry; her mother was a vocalist in Japanese pop jazz fusion group Hiroshima and her father was renowned session drummer Carlos Vega.

== Discography ==
Studio albums

- Always In Motion (2021, Run For Cover)
- Slow It Down (2025, Mini Trees and Many Hats Distribution)

EPs

- Steady Me (2019)
- Slip Away (2020)
- Burn Out (2023)
