= Mark Redito =

Filipino musician

- Also known as: Cocolulu; Spazzkid
- Born: Manila, Philippines
- Origin: Los Angeles, California
- Genres: Electronic; pop
- Occupations: Producer; DJ; singer
- Years active: 2004–present
- Labels: Abandon Building; Cascine; Magical Properties; Magniph; Secret Songs; Zoom Lens
- Website: markredito.com

Mark Redito (/rədiˈtoʊ/ rə-di-TOH), formerly known as Cocolulu and Spazzkid, is a Filipino-American musician based in Los Angeles, California.

== Early life ==
Mark Redito was born in Manila, Philippines.

== Career ==
In his teenage years, Mark Redito was part of the Philippine punk and hardcore scene, playing for bands like Aggressive Dog Attack and Honolulu. He also served as a vocalist for the emo band called On a Day Like Today. After that, he started creating electronic music, using the pseudonym Cocolulu. He then changed his stage name to Spazzkid and moved to the United States.

He released his debut studio album, Desire, in 2013, and the Promise EP in 2014. In 2015, he dropped the pseudonym Spazzkid and started performing under his real name Mark Redito. In 2016, he started Likido, an event series that focuses on artists of color, women, and LGBTQ backgrounds. In 2019, he released a studio album, Neutropical. He also contributed music for the 2019 anime television series Carole & Tuesday.

Redito released his third studio album, Natural Habitat, in 2020.

== Style and influences ==
Mark Redito's musical style has been described by Orlando Weekly as "a signature blend of electronic pop, J-pop and beat music."

== Discography ==
=== Studio albums ===
- Desire (2013) (as Spazzkid)
- Neutropical (2019)
- Natural Habitat (2020)

=== Remix albums ===
- Desire Remixes (2013) (as Spazzkid)
- Neutropical Remix (2019)

=== EPs ===
- A.D.D. Debris (2006) (as Spazzkid)
- Blank Stares (2009) (as Spazzkid)
- Fake Accents (2010) (as Spazzkid)
- Right Now (2011) (as Spazzkid)
- Headphone Jams (2012) (as Spazzkid)
- Promise (2014) (as Spazzkid)
- Promise Remixes Part 1 (2014) (as Spazzkid)
- Promise Remixes Part 2 (2015) (as Spazzkid)
- Everything Felt Right Remixes (2018)

=== Singles ===
- "Weird Girl" (2013) (as Spazzkid)
- "At Fault" (2014) (as Spazzkid)
- "Daytime Disco" (2014) (as Spazzkid)
- "3AM Apologies" (2015)
- "So Many Things to Tell You" (2015)
- "Boba Date" (2016)
- "You'll Only Love Me When I'm Gone" (2016)
- "Everything Felt Right" (2018)
- "Right There" (2018)
- "Never Letting Go of This Moment" (2018)
- "Cloud Keep" (2018)
- "Break Silence" (2019)
