= Kero Kero Bonito =

British indie pop band, established in 2011

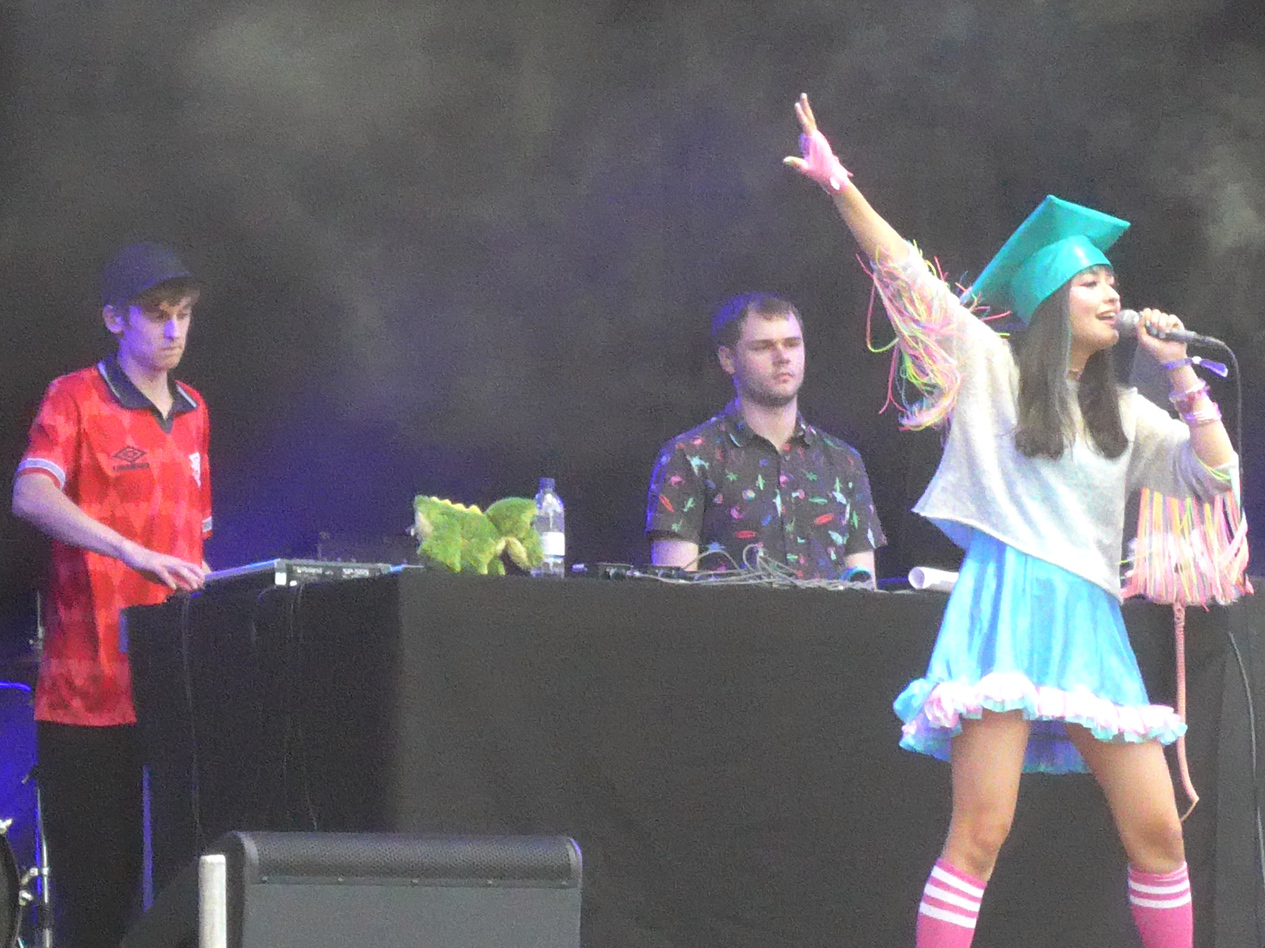
- Kero Kero Bonito at Off Festival 2016

Background information
- Origin: South London, England
- Genres: Indie pop; alternative pop; electropop; dance-rock; hyperpop; bubblegum pop
- Works: Discography
- Years active: 2011–present
- Labels: Flawless World; Double Denim; Sony Japan; Polyvinyl
- Members: Gus Lobban; Jamie Bulled; Sarah Midori Perry
- Website: kerokerobonito.com

Kero Kero Bonito (KKB) are a British indie pop band formed in London in 2011. The band consists of vocalist Sarah Midori Perry and producers and multi-instrumentalists Gus Lobban and Jamie Bulled.

Their musical style has been variously described as indie pop, alternative pop, electropop, dance-rock, hyperpop, and bubblegum pop. The band's earlier work was influenced by J-pop such as Kyary Pamyu Pamyu, as well as dancehall, and video game music; while their 2018 EP TOTEP and second studio album Time 'n' Place was influenced by indie rock contemporaries such as Mount Eerie and My Bloody Valentine. Perry, who is of mixed Japanese and British ancestry, sings and raps in both Japanese and English.

== History ==
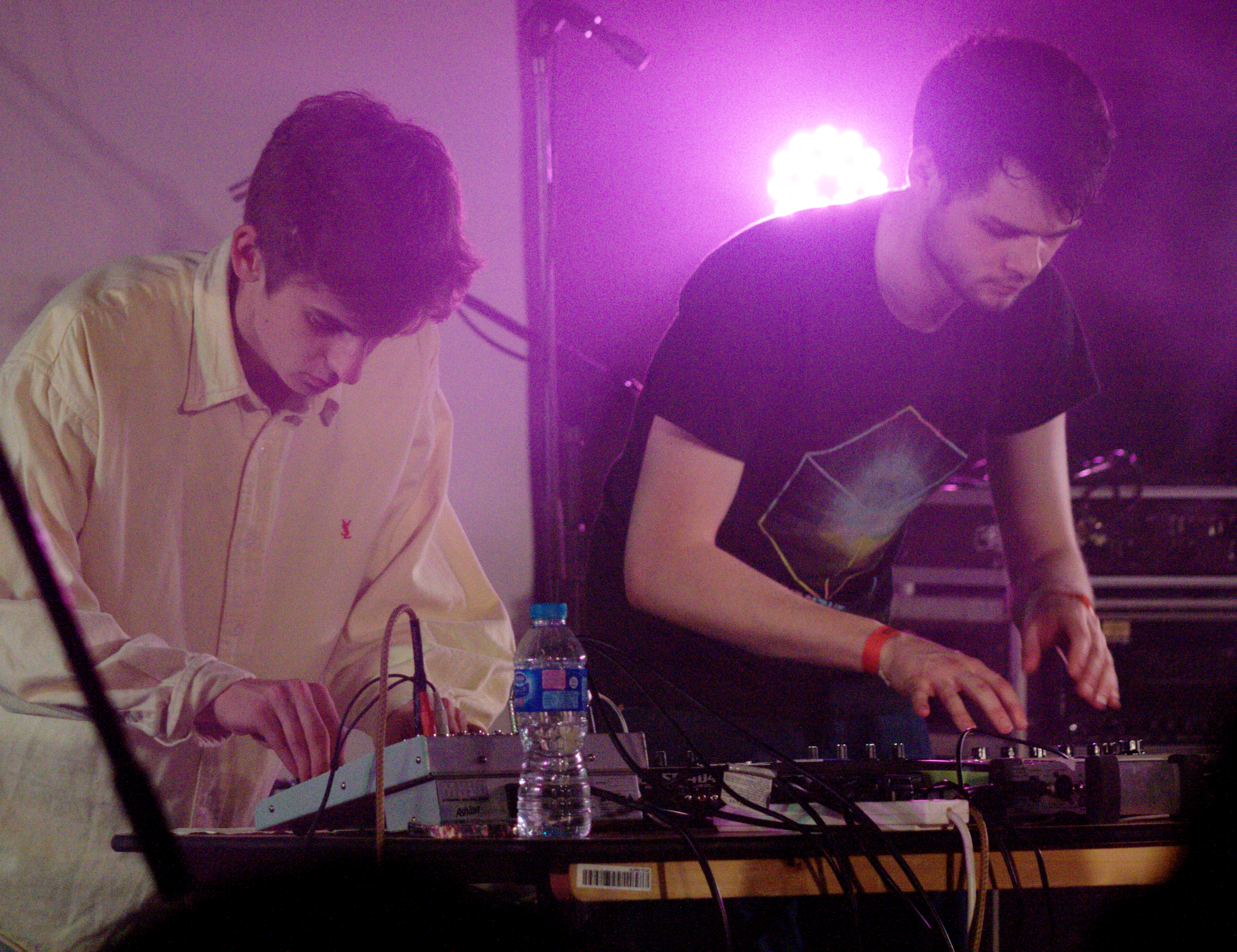
Jamie Bulled (left) and Gus Lobban (right)

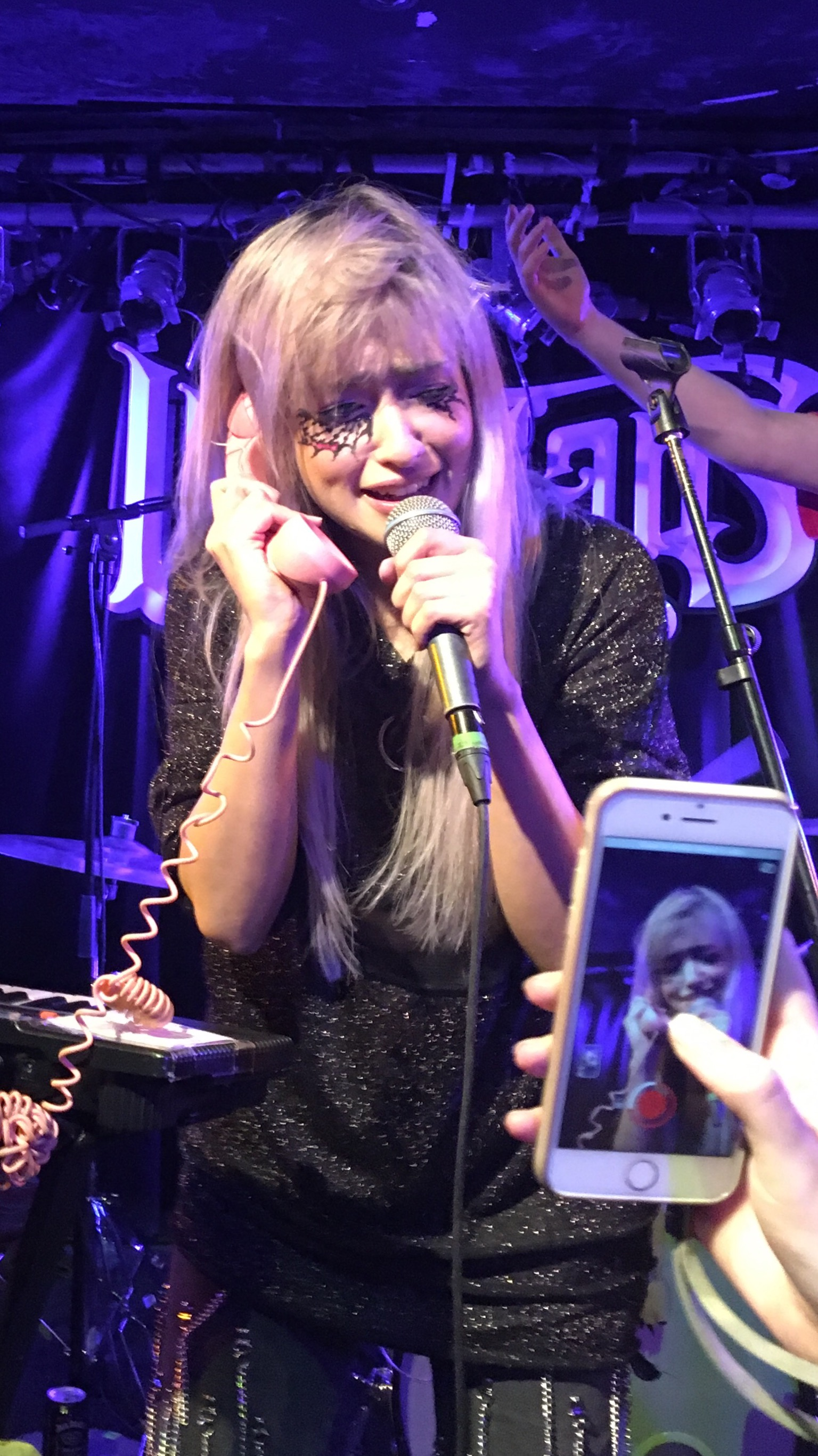
Sarah Midori Perry performing the song "Break" from the album Bonito Generation, live in Dublin (2018)

Lobban and Bulled grew up in Bromley in the suburbs south of London and met in their teens. In search for a new band member, they posted advertisements, including on MixB, an online bulletin board for Japanese expatriates, largely due to their interest in "Japanese rap". Perry was one of the first respondents. They selected her based on her background in art, and their interest in her bilingual ability. Although she had collaborated with a Japanese girl group previously, Perry did not have a background in professional singing; instead, she was interested in collaborating with Lobban and Bulled simply because she "wanted to try it".

The trio called themselves Kero Kero Bonito; its meaning is intentionally ambiguous, with one derivation from the Japanese onomatopoeic words for frog croaks and a type of fish. Other meanings include the Brazilian quero-quero bird while "bonito" means "pretty" in both Portuguese and Spanish, thus "Pretty Quero-quero" – or even "I want, I want pretty" in a rough translation.

The group released their debut mixtape Intro Bonito through Double Denim Records in August 2014. They wrote many of their songs featured on the mixtape using a Casio SA-46 mini-keyboard. The band contributed "Flamingo" to Ryan Hemsworth's compilation EP shh#ffb6c1.

In September 2014, Kero Kero Bonito released Bonito Recycling, a compilation of Intro Bonito remixes by artists including Danny L Harle and Spazzkid. The band released the single "Build It Up", on which Perry sings in a call and response pattern, in November 2014.

On 10 August 2015, Kero Kero Bonito announced their first North American tour, which took place during October 2015.

On 21 October 2016, the group released their first album Bonito Generation through Double Denim.

On 2 February 2017, the YouTuber Berd published a parody animation of the band's single "Flamingo". The video went viral, and became an internet meme, surpassing 25 million views as of April 2023.

On 12 February 2018, the band released the single "Only Acting". It departs from the band's previous electronic sound with a darker, rock-influenced style. Later, on 20 February 2018, the band released the EP TOTEP. The EP included "Only Acting", and other songs following the rock-influenced style.

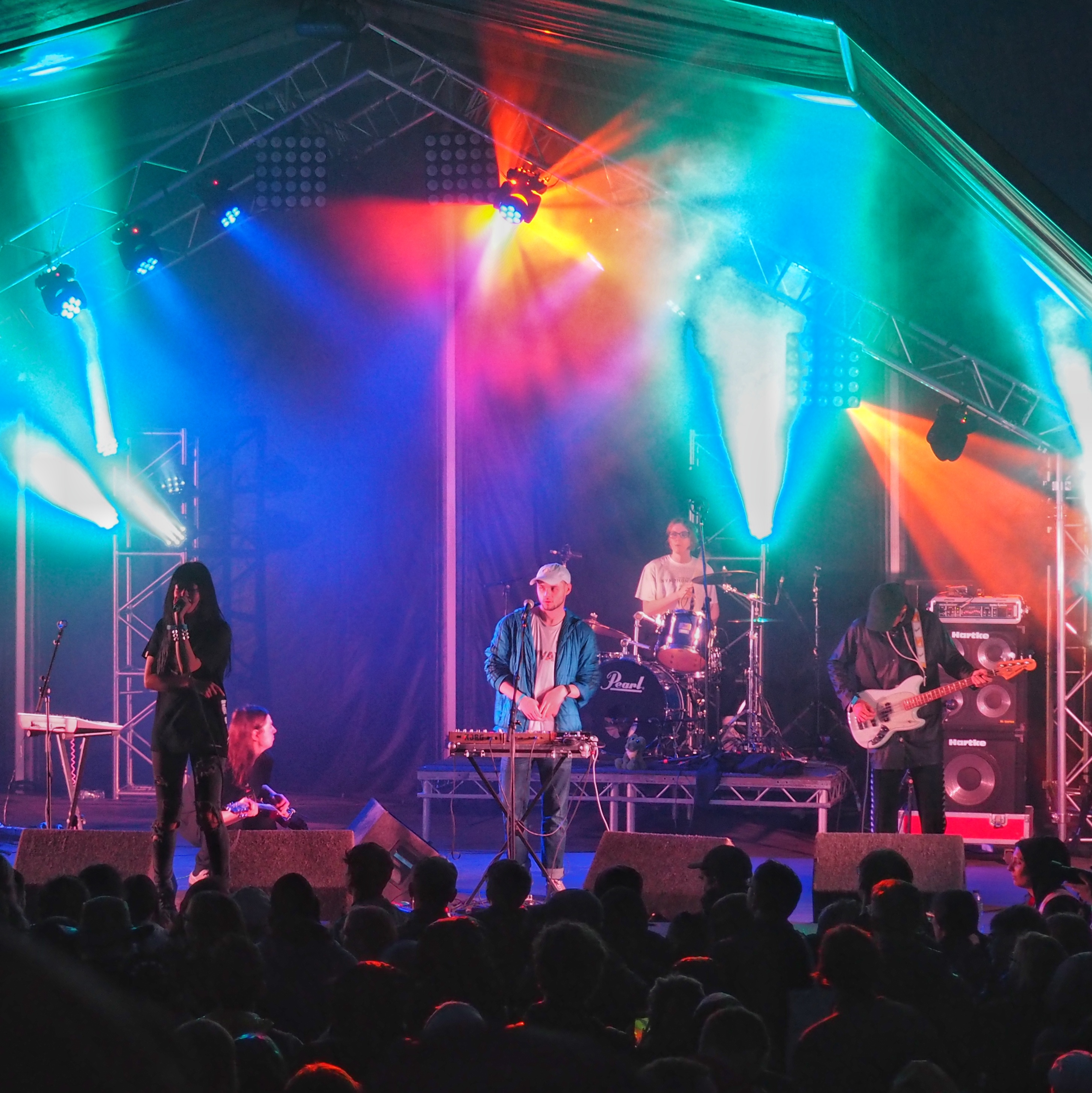
Kero Kero Bonito performing at Indietracks 2019

On 13 April 2018, the band performed their first 'full band' show. This involved two extra members, James Rowland on electric guitar and Jennifer Walton on drums and sampler, as well as Lobban on drums and keyboards and Bulled on bass guitar. Rowland previously played guitar on TOTEP. This change in live line-up reflected their change in sound following the EP.

On 8 May 2018, the band released the single, "Time Today", and announced their second studio album, Time 'n' Place, which was released on 1 October 2018. The album was sonically a significant departure from their previous studio album, and was inspired by radical changes in the band's personal lives following their tour cycle for their debut album.

On 8 July 2019, the band uploaded "KKB Life" to YouTube, a vlog video recorded during the Time 'n' Place era, announcing that a new era is starting. They announced a North America and Europe tour shortly after and released the single "When the Fires Come" in September 2019. Later on in the month, before the tour started, they also released their fourth EP Civilisation I.

In 2020, the band wrote and performed "It's Bugsnax!", the theme song for the video game Bugsnax, which was featured in its announcement trailer.

In April 2021, Kero Kero Bonito released their fifth EP, Civilisation II.

In September 2021, Kero Kero Bonito released "Rom Com 2021", a remix of Soccer Mommy's single "Rom Com 2004". The song was released under the 23rd instalment of Adult Swim's Singles Series.

In August 2023, the band released "Legendary", the official theme song for the Pokémon World Championships.

== Band members ==
- Gus Lobban – production, drums, keyboards, backing vocals (2011–present)
- Jamie Bulled – production, keyboards, bass guitar (2011–present)
- Sarah Midori Perry (Sarah Bonito) – lead vocals, keyboards (2013–present)

=== Live ===
- Jennifer Walton – drums, sampler (2018–present)
- James Rowland – guitar (2018–present)

== Discography ==
Studio albums

- Bonito Generation (2016)
- Time 'n' Place (2018)

Mixtapes

- Intro Bonito (2013)

Extended plays

- Bonito Recycling (2014)
- Bonito Retakes (2017)
- TOTEP (2018)
- Civilisation I (2019)
- Civilisation II (2021)

== Awards and nominations ==
Year	Association	Category	Nominated work	Result	Ref
2019	Libera Award	Best Outlier Album	Time 'n' Place	Nominated	
