= Double Denim Records =

- Founded: 2010
- Genre: Various
- Country of origin: England
- Location: London
- Official website: www.doubledenimrecords.com

Double Denim Records is an English independent record label, launched in 2010 by Jack Thomas and Hari Ashurst-Venn.

== Back catalogue ==
Artist(s)	Year	Release	Notes
Blackbird Blackbird / Paopao	2010	"Pure" / "So Sorry, Girl" / "Liberia" (split 7-inch single)	
Seapony	2010	"Dreaming" (7-inch single)	
Hard Mix / Star Slinger	2011	"Eye Contact" / "Remedy" (split 7-inch single)	
Body Language	2011	"You Can" / "Social Studies" (7-inch single)	
Stay+	2011	"Stay+" / "Young Luv" (7-inch single)	Released under moniker "Christian AIDS"
Celestial Shore	2011	"Pals" / "Place Aux Dames" (7-inch single)	
Outfit	2011	"Two Islands" (7-inch single)	
Zulu Winter	2011	"Never Leave" / "Let's Move Back to Front" (7-inch single)	
Jesse Ruins	2011	"A Bookshelf Sinks into The Sand" / "In Icarus" (7-inch single)	
Amateur Best	2012	"Be Happy" / "The Wave" (7-inch single)	
Hotel Mexico	2012	"A Space in the Loveless Field" (7-inch single)	
Outfit	2012	Another Nights Dreams Reach Earth Again (12-inch EP)	
Amateur Best	2012	"Ready for the Good Life" (7-inch single)	
Mind Enterprises	2012	"Sister" / "Summer War" (7-inch single)	
Pandr Eyez	2012	"Physical Education" single	
Amateur Best	2013	"Too Much" / "Gads Job" (7-inch single)	
Brolin	2013	Cundo (12-inch EP)	
Amateur Best	2013	No Thrills (LP)	12-inch and CD release
Empress Of	2013	Systems (12-inch EP)	Worldwide release, excluding the United States
Various	2013	Double Denim Vol. 1	Compilation album
Outfit	2013	Performance (LP)	12-inch and CD release
Kero Kero Bonito	2014	Intro Bonito (CD)	Worldwide CD release
Kero Kero Bonito	2014	Bonito Recycling (Digital remix EP)	
Tei Shi	2015	Verde (12-inch EP)	
Kero Kero Bonito	2016	Bonito Generation (LP)	Worldwide release, excluding Japan
Jay Som	2017	Everybody Works (LP)	European and Japanese releases
WHARFWHIT	2017	Evidently (10-inch Mini-LP)	
Spencer Zahn	2018	People of the Dawn (LP)	
Rose Droll	2018	Your Dog (LP)	
Mwami	2019	Protean (EP)	
