= Captain Fantastic (soundtrack) =

2016 soundtrack albums

Captain Fantastic (Original Score)

Film score by Alex Somers
- Released: July 8, 2016
- Recorded: 2015–2016
- Genre: Ambience
- Length: 56:31
- Label: Lakeshore; Invada

Alex Somers chronology
Captain Fantastic (2016)	Dawson City: Frozen Time (2016)

Captain Fantastic (Original Soundtrack)

Soundtrack album by various artists
- Released: July 15, 2016
- Genre: Pop; R&B; orchestral
- Length: 43:40
- Label: Lakeshore

Captain Fantastic (Original Score) is the film score to the 2016 film Captain Fantastic directed by Matt Ross, featuring the film's original music composed by Alex Somers, known for his collaborations with Sigur Rós frontman Jónsi, under the name Jónsi & Alex; it also marked Somers' film scoring debut. The album was released by Lakeshore Records on July 8, 2016, alongside the film, with a vinyl edition published by Invada Records on July 29. The soundtrack, entitled Captain Fantastic (Original Motion Picture Soundtrack) was released a week later, on July 15.

== Development ==
Ross liked the musical works of Sigur Rós and also Somers' collaborative album with Jónsi called Riceboy Sleeps (2009). He and the film's editor, Joseph Krings used much of the music from the album as temp tracks for the rough cutting and liked the dreamy atmosphere. He then sent the script to Somers, who was fascinated by the idea of "leaving society altogether and make the move out into the nature" agreeing to be part of the film.

Somers did not rely on an ambient music and instead the way he built with. Some of the challenges he felt were finding ways to have the music reflect the character's growth throughout the film, where "the family leaves their home in the forest and enters society and that major change needed to be reflected in the music somehow" which was tricky to show them. He and Ross wanted the music to strongly underpin the story and the characters, and did not want the adventurous feeling to play too much. Therefore, the music "embodies the spirit of the character's wildness and the isolation that comes with living in the middle of a forest".

Somers mostly developed the sounds by the old-fashioned way, recording to the finished film he was sent. He had a lot of time scoring the film as the filming was completed long back, and had no deadline pressure, so that he could record, re-record and experiment those tracks. The piece he wrote for the very first scene of the film, had to be deleted for the film, as he felt that the nature sounds being apt for the scene.

Somers used piano, dulcitone, glockenspiel, guitars, strings, voices to enhance the ideas in the film. He also used drums and percussion sporadically, as most of the film centered around the forests. And to make it more organic, he used wire brushes scraping on snares and pencils on boxes and manually rubbed drum skins, which were meant to get the right rhythmic textures, and wanted them to sound like they could have been made in the forest. He also used a guitar amplifier choir which he never done before. He further collaborated with his friends, Jónsi and Sindri providing vocals, Amiina playing strings, Óbó played various instruments. Somers felt that he was able to put all of his compositions into the soundtrack as lot of music is not in the film, and as Ross gave him much time to experiment and record and re-record, ending up with loads of music. He took much of the cues he liked and assembled into the album.

== Track listing ==
Captain Fantastic (Original Score)
No.	Title	Length
1.	"A New Beginning"	1:26
2.	"Church"	3:13
3.	"Campfire"	3:56
4.	"Funeral Pyre"	1:38
5.	"She Slit Her Wrists"	2:51
6.	"Memories"	2:14
7.	"Fireflies"	2:12
8.	"Home"	1:06
9.	"Fell"	2:35
10.	"Dream"	1:29
11.	"Near Death"	1:38
12.	"Water (I'm Right Here)"	0:57
13.	"School Bus"	1:37
14.	"Forrest"	2:47
15.	"Look Forward To"	2:58
16.	"Keepsakes"	3:32
17.	"Remembering"	7:16
18.	"Unsoundness"	2:01
19.	"Waving Goodbye"	0:47
20.	"Day Of Your Birth"	1:03
21.	"Water (Not Go Home)"	0:55
22.	"Goodbye…"	1:32
23.	"Disappear"	2:11
24.	"Fortress"	4:37
Total length:		56:31

Captain Fantastic (Original Motion Picture Soundtrack)
No.	Title	Artist(s)	Length
1.	"Boy 1904"	Jónsi & Alex	5:01
2.	"Sweet Child o' Mine"	Viggo Mortensen, George MacKay, Samantha Isler, Annalise Basso, Nicholas Hamilton, Kirk Ross and Philip Klein	3:39
3.	"Scotland the Braver"	Murray Huggins, Kirk Ross, Brian Tichy and David Delhomme	1:49
4.	"I Shall Be Released"	Kirk Ross, Tyra Juliette, Steven Wolf, David Delhomme and Jeff Thall	4:34
5.	"Rain Plans"	Israel Nash	7:18
6.	"Goldberg Variations; BWV 988, Variation 30 a 1 Clav. Quodlibet"	Glenn Gould	5:04
7.	"Unaccompanied Cello Suite No. 4 in E-Flat Major, BWV 1010 Prélude"	Yo-Yo Ma	4:49
8.	"Varðeldur"	Sigur Rós	5:59
9.	"My Heart Will Go On"	The O'Neill Brothers Group	3:58
10.	"Goldberg Variations"	Kirk Ross	1:29
Total length:			43:40

== Reception ==
Simon Tucker of Louder than War gave 9/10 to the album stating: "This album needs to be listened to. It is an album that exists in between the here and there (wherever 'there' may be). It's the streams of light that break through the grey clouds on a rainy day. It gives you hope, it calms you down and it inspires you to reflect and progress with a positive heart and soul."

Olivia Neilson of The State of the Arts wrote "Jonsi collaborator (the Icelandic vocalist of Sigur Ros), Alex Somers, creates a majestic score to complement the stunning cinematography and moving emotional journey Captain Fantastic will take you on." Tara Brady of The Irish Times wrote "Alex Somers score manages a similar aesthetic impact." Reviewing the film's soundtrack, Johnny Brayson of Bustle wrote "The Captain Fantastic soundtrack does a great job of transporting the viewer into the world of the film".
