= We Bought a Zoo (soundtrack) =

We Bought a Zoo (Music from the Motion Picture)

Soundtrack album by Jónsi
- Released: December 13, 2011
- Studios: Newman Scoring Stage, Twentieth Century Fox Studios
- Genre: Film soundtrack
- Length: 51:12
- Labels: Columbia Records; Fox Music
- Producers: Jónsi; Alex Somers; Peter Katis

We Bought a Zoo (Music from the Motion Picture) is the soundtrack to the 2011 Cameron Crowe film We Bought a Zoo. The score for the film is composed by Jón Þór "Jónsi" Birgisson, lead singer of the band Sigur Rós. The soundtrack was released on December 13, 2011, by Columbia Records and Fox Music, to critical acclaim.

== Background ==
In August 2011, it was announced that Icelandic musician Jón Þór "Jónsi" Birgisson, the lead singer of the band Sigur Rós, would be composing the music scores for We Bought a Zoo. Crowe confirmed the same on Twitter when he was promoting his documentary film Pearl Jam Twenty. Crowe shared a long history with the band as they licensed their first pieces of music for use in a film, allowing the former to use selected songs: "Svefn-g-englar", "Agaetis Byrjun" and the live version of "The Nothing Song" in Vanilla Sky (2001). He admitted playing the band's music constantly which inspired it to become the "DNA of his own film".

Crowe selected a mix of tracks on his playlist, which includes three songs from Jónsi's studio album Go (2010). He said that the album to him "was so intoxicating and positive while still being complex" like "bringing joy and positivity with equal measures of truth and depth with the music". When the album was played on set, Matt Damon and the associates responded to the music immediately. This got Crowe thinking that "he would be the right musical voice, if he scores for the film". During the same time, Jónsi mailed Crowe after watching Almost Famous (2000) on television, agreeing to be a part of the film.

In a November 2011 interview to Uproxx, Crowe recalled that he considered asking his associates to have Neil Young or Eddie Vedder (both artists were featured on Crowe's playlist mix given to Damon) to score for the film, but ultimately felt Jónsi was the right choice. He described the choice as "only natural", since "Jónsi has been a part of the making of We Bought A Zoo from the very beginning".

== Composition ==
Three days after Jónsi mailing Crowe, he arrived to Los Angeles for a one-week scoring session, and wrote all the main themes on his laptop. He composed the film's theme as the first for the film, which was a "magical, child-like composition" and played largely on a glockenspiel that created "a sense of awe and wonder". His primary scoring session was done at the Newman Scoring Stage in Fox Studios, where the director, composer and other music personnel had separate offices, so that all the people who were working on the film were only in this building; he called it "a really concentrated energy".

Crowe worried, with regards to Jónsi: "The question was could he write stuff based on this movie and based on these characters" but "It became apparent very quickly that he was up to the task." Crowe further asked Jónsi think of "a cinematic score" while writing, t; si disagreed an.dCe said "te of Jónsi, "shuts his eyes and gets lost in the musical world". For Jónsi, he felt writing to someone else's vision was the hardest part as "You can be egocentric when writing your own music. But when writing for film, “Yoyouve to think in terms of how the movie flows, this scene, etc. I learned a lot from it."

== Release ==
The album's track list and cover art was officially revealed on November 2, 2011. On November 15, 2011, the first track from the album, "Gathering Stones", was released by Jónsi on the internet. Rolling Stone made available an exclusive pre-release stream of the soundtrack on iTunes on December 5, 2011. The "We Bought a Zoo" soundtrack CD was released by Columbia Records on December 13, 2011.

== Critical response ==
Aggregator Metacritic, which uses a weighted average, assigned We Bought a Zoo (Music from the Motion Picture) a score of 67 out of 100 based on 13 critics, indicating "generally favorable reviews".

Reviewing for Pitchfork, Ian Cohen assigned a score of 7/10 and wrote "it's all lovely and certainly more immediately engaging and compact than Jónsi's mostly-instrumental Riceboy Sleeps multimedia project from 2009. But it also has something going for it more important than gorgeous ambience: the Jónsi seal of quality [...] offering the bold and evolving gestures of Jónsi's past decade in a relatively safe and compact design allows the possibility that a moviegoer might come out of the theater curious enough to parlay $10 into a meaningful relationship with Jónsi's music." A writer from Uncut commented: "It's certainly easy to believe that these sublime pieces could have inspired such a profound reaction [from director Cameron Crowe]" Marcus Gilmer of The A. V. Club wrote "with Sigur Rós' hiatus over and the success of Go, this collection stands as a fine next step in Jónsi's evolving career." Andy Gill of The Independent wrote that Jónsi "devised a musical backdrop that subtly evokes the innocence, warmth and zoophiliac empathy of the film's message".

Nianyi Hong of PopMatters wrote "We Bought a Zoo is good enough to quench our thirst for either a new Jónsi or Sigur Rós album. It certainly helps that it does stands out on its own. If anything, We Bought a Zoo makes us take Jónsi's solo career seriously, not just as an offshoot of Sigur Rós, but as a legitimate project." Matthew Cole of Slant Magazine wrote "If there's a hard-to-shop-for Sigur Rós fan in your life, say a little blessing to the spirit of corporate synergy." NME called the soundtrack "as dreamy and atmospheric as you might expect". Alex Young of Consequence commented "There's a stereotype of rock musicians becoming boring and predictable later in their careers, because they've run out of issues to bitch about. Jónsi certainly hasn't reached the tipping point of tedium yet, but maybe it's doing projects like We Bought a Zoo that is fighting that process we all hope is not inevitable." Mike Diver of BBC wrote "It's fair to think that, just maybe, this adulation might lead to ego on the artist's part hindering his ability to deliver an effective end product, but such thoughts are soon enough dashed by familiar motifs which reassure the listener that Jónsi is on form."

A review from Mojo commented that the album "can perfectly capture the film's conflicted moods of sadness and euphoria, but just as easily turn cloying and sickly". Laura Studarus of Under the Radar commented "The highs and lows of Sigur Rós and Jónsi sandpapered to a Prozac-worthy sheen, We Bought a Zoo is a sweet stopgap, but no substitute for a proper follow up." Jon O'Brien of AllMusic wrote "Despite the several contributions from Go, We Bought a Zoo is more in keeping with his band's experimental symphonies than his own electronica-inspired excursions, suggesting Jonsi should have no trouble slotting back into the Sigur Rós fold for their proposed comeback, but it's still a wonderfully imaginative score which deserves some recognition come awards season."

== Accolades ==
The song "Gathering Stories" was on the shortlist of 39 songs that are eligible to be nominated for Best Original Song category at the 84th Academy Awards, which ultimately failed to enter the final nominations. It received a Satellite Award for Best Original Song, which was lost to "Lay Your Head Down" for Albert Nobbs (2011). Jónsi, however won the BMI Award for Film Music.

== Track listing ==
No.	Title	Artist(s)	Length
1.	"Why Not?"	Jónsi	4:49
2.	"Ævin Endar"	Jónsi	3:32
3.	"Boy Lilikoi"	Jónsi	4:29
4.	"Sun"	Jónsi	1:50
5.	"Brambles"	Jónsi	2:24
6.	"Sinking Friendships"	Jónsi	4:42
7.	"We Bought a Zoo"	Jónsi	4:21
8.	"Hoppípolla"	Sigur Rós	4:30
9.	"Snærisendar"	Jónsi	2:43
10.	"Sink Ships"	Jónsi	2:21
11.	"Go Do"	Jónsi	4:41
12.	"Whole Made of Pieces"	Jónsi	2:47
13.	"Humming"	Jónsi	2:33
14.	"First Day"	Jónsi	1:40
15.	"Gathering Stories"	Jónsi	3:56
Total length:			51:12

== Additional music ==
In addition to Jónsi's score, the complete soundtrack of the film included a variety of artists, which were not in the album. The track list, according to IndieWire:

- "Don't Come Around Here No More" – Tom Petty and the Heartbreakers
- "Do It Clean" – Echo & the Bunnymen
- "Airline to Heaven" – Wilco
- "Don't Be Shy" – Cat Stevens
- "Living with the Law" – Chris Whitley
- "Last Medicine Dance" – Mike McCready
- "Buckets of Rain" – Bob Dylan
- "I'm Open" – Pearl Jam
- "No Soy Del Valle" – Quantic Presenta Flowering Inferno
- "Like I Told You" – Acetone
- "Ashley Collective" – Mike McCready
- "For a Few Dollars More" – The Upsetters
- "Hunger Strike" – Temple of the Dog
- "Mariachi El Bronx" – Mariachi El Bronx
- "Haleakala Sunset" – CKsquared
- "Cinnamon Girl" (live) – Neil Young
- "Holocene" – Bon Iver
- "Throwing Arrows" – Mike McCready
- "Work to Do" – The Isley Brothers
- "All Your Love (I Miss Loving)" – Otis Rush
- "I Think It's Going to Rain Today" – Randy Newman
