= Simon Proulx-Sénécal =

Armenian ice dancer

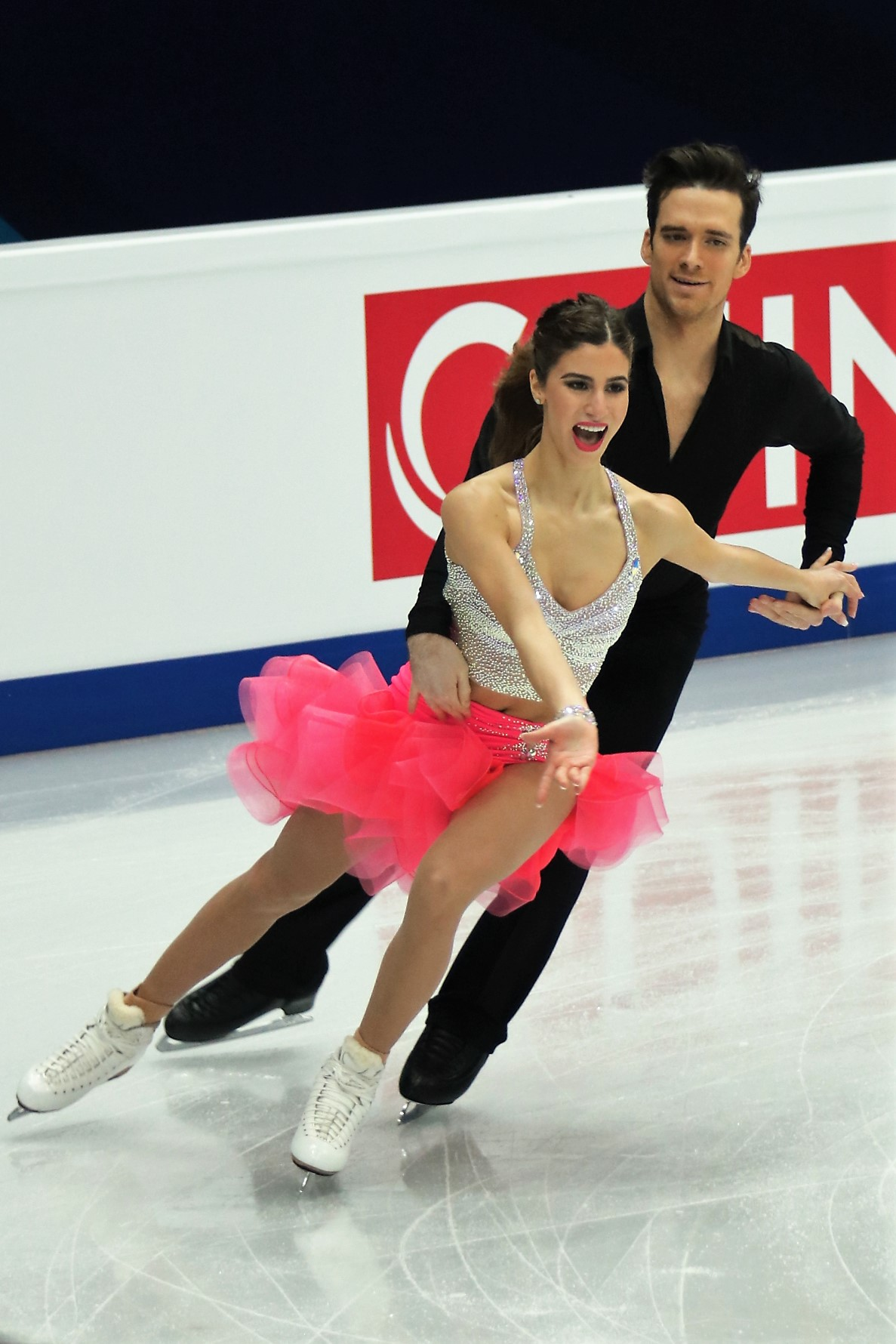
- Proulx-Sénécal and Garabedian in 2018

Personal information
- Born: December 6, 1991 (age 34) LaSalle, Quebec, Canada
- Height: 1.86 m (6 ft 1 in)

Figure skating career
- Country: Armenia
- Coach: Shae Zukiwsky, Shawn Winter
- Began skating: 1999

Simon Proulx-Sénécal (born December 6, 1991) is a Canadian-born ice dancer who competes with Tina Garabedian for Armenia. They are the 2015 Golden Spin of Zagreb bronze medalists and reached the free dance at two European Championships (2016, 2017).

== Personal life ==
Simon Proulx-Sénécal was born on December 6, 1991, in LaSalle, Quebec, Canada, of French Canadian heritage. Proulx-Sénécal came out as gay.

== Career ==
=== Early years ===
Proulx-Sénécal switched from ice hockey to figure skating when he was seven years old and teamed up with his first partner at age twelve. Competing with Josyane Cholette, he placed 11th in junior ice dancing at both the 2011 and 2012 Canadian Championships. He and Christina Penkov were 15th on the junior level at the 2013 Canadian Championships. During the next two seasons, he competed with Mélissande Dumas on the senior level. They finished 11th at the 2014 Canadian Championships and 12th in 2015.

=== Partnership with Garabedian ===
In May 2015, Proulx-Sénécal teamed up with Tina Garabedian to compete for Armenia. Making their international debut, they placed sixth at the 2015 Ice Challenge, a 2015–16 ISU Challenger Series (CS) event held in October in Graz, Austria. In December, they won their first CS medal – bronze at the 2015 Golden Spin of Zagreb.

In January 2016, Garabedian/Proulx-Sénécal were one of twenty teams to qualify for the final segment at the European Championships in Bratislava, Slovakia, having ranked 20th in the short dance. They finished 18th overall after placing 18th in the free dance.

== Programs ==
(with Garabedian)

Season	Short dance	Free dance
2021–2022	Soul: Respect; Blues: Bridge over Troubled Water; R&B: Think by Aretha Franklin	Autumn Leaves by Joseph Kosma & Johnny Mercer; Luck Be a Lady (from Guys and Dolls) by Frank Loesser
2019–2021	Mamma Mia; Honey, Honey; Take a Chance on Me; Dancing Queen (from Mamma Mia) by ABBA	Autumn Leaves by Joseph Kosma & Johnny Mercer; Luck Be a Lady (from Guys and Dolls) by Frank Loesser
2017–2018	Salsa: Vente Pa' Ca; Samba: La Bomba by Ricky Martin	A Time for Us (from Romeo and Juliet) by Nino Rota; Old Money by Lana Del Rey
2016–2017	Blues; Swing	Pearl Harbor by Hans Zimmer
2015–2016	Waltz: Waltz of the Flowers (from The Nutcracker) by Pyotr Ilyich Tchaikovsky; March: Go Do by Jónsi	Everybody Wants to Rule the World by Tears for Fears; Cosmic Love by Florence Welch, Isabella Summers

== Competitive highlights ==
GP: Grand Prix; CS: Challenger Series

=== With Garabedian for Armenia ===
International
Event	15–16	16–17	17–18	19–20	21–22
Olympics					18th
Worlds	27th	25th	22nd	C	14th
Europeans	18th	19th	19th	17th	13th
CS Golden Spin	3rd	11th	15th		4th
CS Ice Challenge	6th				
CS Nebelhorn			8th		4th
CS U.S. Classic		9th	6th		
CS Warsaw Cup		5th		8th	
Bavarian Open	2nd				
Budapest Trophy					1st
Lake Placid IDI					2nd
Santa Claus Cup				2nd	
Toruń Cup				3rd	
National
Armenian	1st				
TBD = Assigned; WD = Withdrew; C = Cancelled

=== Earlier partnerships ===
National
Event	2010–11 (with Cholette)	2011–12 (with Cholette)	2012–13 (with Penkov)	2013–14 (with Dumas)	2014–15 (with Dumas)
Canadian Champ.	11th J	11th J	15th J	11th	12th
J = Junior level
