= Tina Garabedian =

Armenian competitive ice dancer (born 1997)

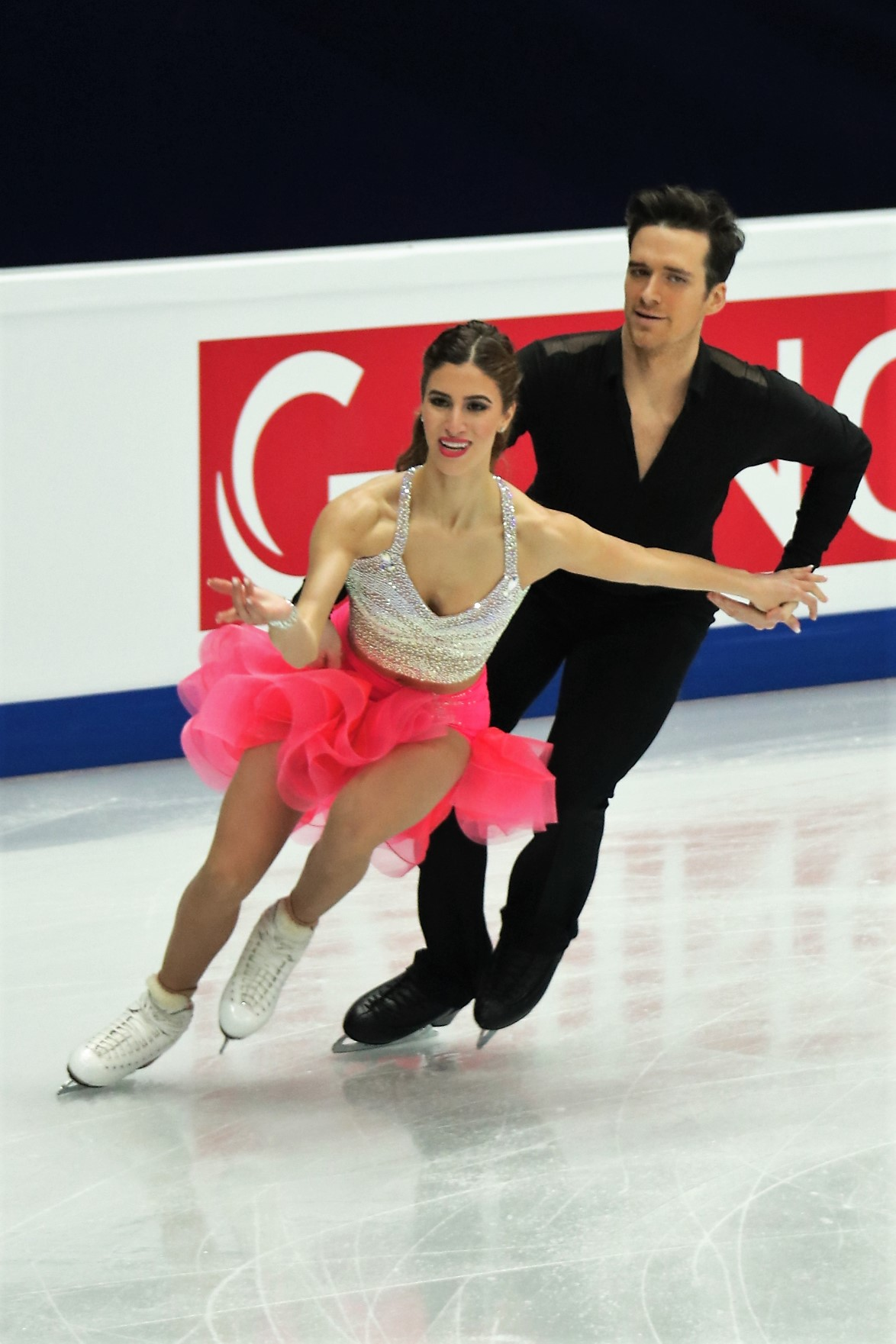
- Garabedian and Proulx-Sénécal in 2018

Personal information
- Born: June 13, 1997 (age 29) Laval, Quebec, Canada
- Home town: Laval, Quebec
- Height: 1.65 m (5 ft 5 in)

Figure skating career
- Country: Armenia
- Coach: Marie-France Dubreuil, Patrice Lauzon, Romain Haguenauer
- Began skating: 2002
- Retired: 2022

Tina Garabedian (Armenian: Թինա Կարապետյան; born June 13, 1997) is a retired Armenian-Canadian ice dancer. She and her partner Simon Proulx-Sénécal represented Armenia at the 2022 Winter Olympics.

== Personal life ==
Tina Garabedian was born on June 13, 1997, in Laval, Quebec, Canada. She is one of three daughters of Maral Dermeguerditchian and John Garabedian, both born in Lebanon. She attended L'École Arménienne Sourp Hagop up to grade 7 and then switched to Collège Gérald-Godin with a sports-study program to accommodate her skating schedule. In 2021 she graduated from McGill University with distinction, winning the Laddie Millen Award for top marks. She holds dual Canadian and Armenian citizenship.

== Career ==
=== Early years ===
Garabedian began skating in 2002. She competed in singles until age 14 and then spent a year as a member of a synchronized skating team. She formed an ice dancing partnership with Alexandre Laliberté in 2012. Appearing on the junior level, the two placed 9th at the 2014 Canadian Championships and debuted internationally the following season, representing Armenia. After placing 7th at both of their 2014–15 ISU Junior Grand Prix assignments – in Ostrava, Czech Republic and Dresden, Germany – Garabedian/Laliberté were sent to the 2015 World Junior Championships in Tallinn. In Estonia, they were 18th in the short dance and qualified to the free dance, where they placed 15th, lifting them to 16th overall.

=== Partnership with Proulx-Sénécal ===
In May 2015, Garabedian teamed up with Simon Proulx-Sénécal, with whom she began competing on the senior level. She stated, "My coaches wanted us to skate together when I first started dance, but he was already 21 and had to move up to senior, and I was not ready for that then." Making their international debut, they placed sixth at the 2015 Ice Challenge, a 2015–16 ISU Challenger Series (CS) event held in October in Graz, Austria. In December, they won their first CS medal – bronze at the 2015 Golden Spin of Zagreb.

In January 2016, Garabedian/Proulx-Sénécal were one of twenty teams to qualify for the final segment at the European Championships in Bratislava, Slovakia, having ranked 20th in the short dance. They finished 18th overall after placing 18th in the free dance.

== Programs ==
=== With Proulx-Sénécal ===
Season	Short dance	Free dance
2021–2022	Soul: Respect; Blues: Bridge over Troubled Water; R&B: Think by Aretha Franklin	Autumn Leaves by Joseph Kosma & Johnny Mercer; Luck Be a Lady (from Guys and Dolls) by Frank Loesser
2019–2021	Mamma Mia; Honey, Honey; Take a Chance on Me; Dancing Queen (from Mamma Mia) by ABBA	Autumn Leaves by Joseph Kosma & Johnny Mercer; Luck Be a Lady (from Guys and Dolls) by Frank Loesser
2017–2018	Salsa: Vente Pa' Ca; Samba: La Bomba by Ricky Martin	A Time for Us (from Romeo and Juliet) by Nino Rota; Old Money by Lana Del Rey
2016–2017	Blues; Swing	Pearl Harbor by Hans Zimmer
2015–2016	Waltz: Waltz of the Flowers (from The Nutcracker) by Pyotr Ilyich Tchaikovsky; March: Go Do by Jónsi	Everybody Wants to Rule the World by Tears for Fears; Cosmic Love by Florence Welch, Isabella Summers

=== With Laliberté ===
Season	Short dance	Free dance
2014–2015	Samba: Rhumba: Samba:	Once in the Musical

== Competitive highlights ==
GP: Grand Prix; CS: Challenger Series; JGP: Junior Grand Prix

=== With Proulx-Sénécal ===
International
Event	15–16	16–17	17–18	18–19	19–20	20–21	21–22
Olympics							18th
Worlds	27th	25th	22nd		C	WD	14th
Europeans	18th	19th	19th		17th		13th
CS Asian Open							WD
CS Autumn Classic							WD
CS Golden Spin	3rd	11th	15th				4th
CS Ice Challenge	6th						
CS Nebelhorn			8th				4th
CS U.S. Classic		9th	6th				
CS Warsaw Cup		5th			8th		
Bavarian Open	2nd						
Budapest Trophy							1st
Lake Placid IDI							2nd
Santa Claus Cup					2nd		
Toruń Cup					3rd		
National
Armenian	1st						
TBD = Assigned; WD = Withdrew; C = Cancelled

=== With Laliberté ===
International
Event	2013–14	2014–15
World Junior Champ.		16th
JGP Czech Republic		7th
JGP Germany		7th
Santa Claus Cup		7th J
National
Canadian Champ.	9th J	
J = Junior level
