= Riceboy Sleeps =

Riceboy Sleeps may refer to:

- Jónsi & Alex
- Riceboy Sleeps (album)
- Riceboy Sleeps (film)
