= Shiver (Jónsi album) =

Studio album by Jónsi
- Released: 2 October 2020
- Recorded: Reykjavík, Iceland; Berlin, Germany; London, England; Suomenlinna, Helsinki, Finland
- Length: 52:28
- Label: Krunk
- Producer: A. G. Cook (also exec.); Jónsi (also exec.)

Jónsi chronology
Dark Morph II (2020)	Shiver (2020)	Tom Clancy's Without Remorse (Soundtrack) (2021)

Singles from Shiver
- 1. "Exhale" Released: 23 April 2020; 2. "Swill" Released: 24 June 2020; 3. "Cannibal" Released: 14 August 2020; 4. "Salt Licorice" Released: 30 September 2020

Professional ratings
Aggregate scores
Source	Rating
AnyDecentMusic?	6.7/10
Metacritic	71/100
Review scores
Source	Rating
AllMusic	4/5 stars
Clash	7/10
Loud and Quiet	7/10
NME	3/5 stars
Pitchfork	5.5/10
Under the Radar	8/10 stars

Shiver is the second studio album by Icelandic musician Jónsi, frontman of the post-rock band Sigur Rós. The album was released on 2 October 2020 via Krunk. It comes 10 years after his previous solo effort, Go. It was made in collaboration with English music producer, singer and head of record label PC Music, A. G. Cook.

The album is 11 tracks long and features a largely electronic musical palette, differing from the music Jónsi has created in the past. It was supported by the singles "Exhale", "Swill", "Cannibal" and "Salt Licorice". It features collaborations with Scottish singer and vocalist of the band Cocteau Twins, Elizabeth Fraser, and Swedish singer Robyn. The album cover was shot by Barnaby Roper.

== Background ==
On 8 May 2018, A. G. Cook took part in Sigur Rós' Liminal takeover on NTS Radio. Cook shared remixes of Sigur Rós tracks, as well as demos for Jónsi, hinting at further collaboration between the two in the future.

On 28 June 2019, Jónsi was interviewed by The Feed SBS, where he shared he had an upcoming collaboration with Swedish singer Robyn for his next album, stating, "It's really good. It’s full on like thump, thump, thump.”

On 3 April 2020, Jónsi took to Instagram to announce that he was releasing music later that month.

== Release and promotion ==
On 14 April 2020, Jónsi announced his lead single off of Shiver, "Exhale", would be released 23 April. "Exhale" was released with an accompanying music video, directed by Jónsi and Giovanni Ribisi.

On 20 June, Jónsi announced another single, "Swill", set for release on 24 June. "Swill" was released with an accompanying music video, directed by Barnaby Roper.

The same day, Jónsi announced that his second studio album Shiver would be released on 2 October of the same year; the album preorder and track listing were also made available. Jónsi wrote in a press release announcing the album:

Not too long ago Jónsi was traveling through London, where he met up with iconoclastic producer A. G. Cook, who he admired for his boundary-breaking work with the PC Music collective. He had no expectation for the meeting, but the more they talked, the more he realized they might be perfect collaborators. "I've been doing this for 30 years," Jónsi says. "I get tired of everything really easily. I always want things to be fun and exciting and fresh, and doing another album...I just wanted to have a different approach." Jónsi had made a career on sweeping music that plumbed the depths of the human experience and our connection to the natural world. Cook’s production exists at the opposite end of the spectrum: synthetic, sometimes abrasive, and often on the cutting edge of experimentalism. On paper, their collaboration is surprising, but Shiver is a beautiful record that pushes Jónsi's otherworldly voice into startling new territories.

On 1 August, Jónsi began teasing another single release for the album, followed by another teaser on 8 August. On 12 August, Jónsi announced the release of "Cannibal", which features Scottish singer and vocalist of the band Cocteau Twins, Elizabeth Fraser, as the third single from the album, due for release on 14 August. It was released with an accompanying music video, directed by Jónsi and Giovanni Ribisi.

Jónsi began releasing teasers for tracks on the album, beginning on 17 September, and ending on 24 September.

Jónsi confirmed the release of the final single for the album, "Salt Licorice" featuring Swedish singer Robyn, on 29 September. The single was released the next day on 30 September, with an accompanying music video directed by Jónsi & Rene van Pannevis, which Jónsi filmed in lockdown.

== Track listing ==
All tracks written by Jónsi and produced by A. G. Cook and Jónsi, except where noted.

No.	Title	Writer(s)	Producer(s)	Length
1.	"Exhale"	Jónsi; Alexander Cook		5:12
2.	"Shiver"		A. G. Cook; Jónsi; Nicolas Petitfrère^{[a]}	4:19
3.	"Cannibal" (with Elizabeth Fraser)	Jónsi; Elizabeth Fraser	Cook; Jónsi; Petitfrère^{[a]}	4:58
4.	"Wildeye"	Jónsi; Cook	Cook; Jónsi; Petitfrère^{[a]}	4:36
5.	"Sumarið sem aldrei kom"		Cook; Jónsi; Petitfrère^{[a]}	6:44
6.	"Kórall"	Jónsi; Cook	Cook; Jónsi; Petitfrère^{[a]}; Jack Armitage^{[a]}	6:22
7.	"Salt Licorice" (with Robyn)			3:47
8.	"Hold"	Jónsi; Cook		3:00
9.	"Swill"			3:50
10.	"Grenade"			5:32
11.	"Beautiful Boy"			4:09
Total length:				52:28

Japanese bonus track
No.	Title	Writer(s)	Length
12.	"Mold"	Jónsi; Cook	4:22
Total length:			56:57

Notes

- ^{^[a]} signifies an additional producer
- "Beautiful Boy" is a reworking of the track "TB8" by Frakkur, a Jónsi side project.

== Personnel ==
Credits adapted from Jónsi's Instagram.

=== Additional performers ===
- Jack Armitage (track 6)
- Julianna Barwick (track 4)
- A. G. Cook (all tracks)
- Elizabeth Fraser (track 3)
- Samuli Kosminen (tracks 3, 4, 7 and 10)
- Mary Lattimore (track 4)
- Nico Muhly (tracks 2 and 10)
- Nicolas Petitfrère (tracks 2–6)
- Robyn (track 7)

=== Technical ===
- A. G. Cook – engineering (all tracks)
- Nicolas Petitfrère – additional engineering (track 5)
- Damon Reece – additional engineering (track 3)
- Alex Somers – additional engineering (tracks 7, 8 and 10)
- Geoff Swan – mixing (all tracks)

=== Design and artwork ===
- Sarah Hopper – design
- Jónsi – design
- Pandagunda – inside image
- Barnaby Roper – cover photography, inside image

== Charts ==
Chart performance for Shiver
Chart (2020)	Peak position
Scottish Albums (OCC)	56
Swiss Albums (Schweizer Hitparade)	88

== Release history ==
Region	Date	Format	Label	Ref.
Various	2 October 2020	Digital download; streaming	Krunk	
Various	2 October 2020	CD	Krunk	
Various	2 October 2020	LP; limited LP	Krunk	
