= Boy Erased (soundtrack) =

2018 soundtrack album

Boy Erased (Original Motion Picture Soundtrack)

Soundtrack album / film score by Danny Bensi and Saunder Jurriaans
- Released: October 26, 2018
- Recorded: 2018
- Studio: Gary's Electric Studio, Brooklyn, New York City; Bernie Grundman Mastering, Hollywood, Los Angeles
- Genre: Film score; soundtrack album
- Length: 47:16
- Label: Back Lot Music
- Producer: Danny Bensi; Saunder Jurriaans

Danny Bensi and Saunder Jurriaans chronology
Rosy (2018)	Boy Erased (2018)	Paseo (2018)

Singles from Boy Erased (Original Motion Picture Soundtrack)
- 1. "Revelation" Released: October 18, 2018

Boy Erased (Original Motion Picture Soundtrack) is the soundtrack album to the 2018 film Boy Erased directed by Joel Edgerton. The film score is composed by Danny Bensi and Saunder Jurriaans and featured an original song "Revelation" performed by Troye Sivan and Jónsi, which released as a single on October 18, 2018. The soundtrack released through Back Lot Music on October 26, 2018.

== Background ==
Danny Bensi and Saunder Jurriaans, who previously scored Edgerton's The Gift (2015), reunited with the director to compose for Boy Erased. When the duo provided the script, they felt more excited as it was departed from the tonality of his previous film, adding "The idea of doing something a little bit more real and socially conscious and relevant was really attractive to us. But also, the idea of taking a complicated drama and finding a way to score it that would avoid pushing it into too much of a sappier, overemotional situation." However, it was further challenging for the duo, as they had to navigate the dramatic, emotional, societal aspects through music; Jurrians added "We wanted to avoid being too subversive. A big orchestral score can push you in certain directions."

Bensi and Jurriaans wrote a "meandering couple of melodies" and a piano piece as the opening cue which needed to set the tone and the melodies recurring at special moments; however, when they first wrote the piece, it was "kind of like a meandering, soulful, introspective piece" which they thought about. The cue had two sections: A and B and found that the approach worked. Afterwards, the cue shifts in-between baroque and classical music, where a "strict, arpeggiated piano motif" recurring, and a piano which served as the backbone of that piece to provide an "exciting and poignant" but serious tune. Afterwards, the other instruments come in after multiple ideas taking place. Edgerton's likeness to the piano—as his previous film The Gift utilized more piano—resulted in the instrument being prominent. However, they used numerous pizzicato strings and interlocking rhythmic parts that represented the struggle in Jared's (Lucas Hedges) thoughts. A subtle boys choir was also utilized to provide nods to "the idea of religious choir music, and also bringing in the idea of innocence and humanity" along with violins which they consider it to be "very frail and naked and fragile".

The score had subtle influences of Arvo Pärt's works, which Bensi attributed to his style of writing where "the color works so well in modern day, to bow to that epic, religious, omnipotent vibe" without orchestras and the use of traditional chords which provide a subtle, powerful musical palette. As the duo liked their minimalistic writing, they partly approached with a minimalistic stuff to musically narrate Jared's thoughts. The use of two violins in the high registers represent the two thoughts in his head, with the sinister bass line holding the suspension as he tries to figure out; the violins are considered to be passionate in narrating Jared thoughts' but with a religious feel—"a sense of awe that he's dealing with very big and very important, introspective issues."

Bensi and Jurrians played most of the instruments where the layer the strings and piano; all of them were recorded live. Initially, they wanted to play the solo violin in parts. However, once the cues were composed and which Edgerton liked it, they conducted and recorded a chamber string ensemble of violins to play on top of the strings to provide a different sound and experiment them. Besides, they also brought a piano player to record them as the duo wanted a different interpretation of their piano playing and experimented them. The recording of the boys' choir was used in an untraditional, modern musical way where the choir members being instructed to do "rhythmical, weird, avant-garde stuff" to provide texture; similar to the likes of Philip Glass and Steve Reich, they added syncopated and rhythmic syllables. The sounds of strings were bended in pitches which had been liked by Edgerton, with Bensi added "Those bendy violins are Beethovian chords, quite dark, emotive, introspective music. It was a theatrical musical technique to create a kind of dizzying, disoriented effect."

== Release ==
The film features an original song "Revelation" performed by Troye Sivan (who also starred in the film) alongside Sigur Rós frontman Jónsi. It was released as a single on October 18, 2018. Sivan performed the song live on The Ellen DeGeneres Show and The Tonight Show Starring Jimmy Fallon, to promote the film. The soundtrack was released through Back Lot Music on October 26.

== Track listing ==
No.	Title	Length
1.	"Revelation" (Troye Sivan and Jónsi)	3:51
2.	"Road Trip"	2:06
3.	"The Rules"	2:50
4.	"Genograms"	1:38
5.	"A Normal Family"	1:19
6.	"Fall Into Line"	1:20
7.	"Holiday Camp"	1:29
8.	"Between Us"	3:10
9.	"The Real Work"	1:02
10.	"Assembly"	0:56
11.	"Prayer"	0:58
12.	"Just a Story"	2:36
13.	"Start To Wonder"	1:28
14.	"Run In the Night"	2:07
15.	"Brandon"	0:36
16.	"Triangles"	1:33
17.	"The Funeral"	2:43
18.	"Fake It ‘Til You Make It"	1:32
19.	"Just a Moment"	1:25
20.	"Shame On You"	1:00
21.	"Cameron"	1:34
22.	"Turned My Back"	1:43
23.	"Who Are You Thinking Of?" (Jónsi)	4:28
24.	"Revelation" (Vinyl Version) (Troye Sivan and Jónsi)	3:52
Total length:		47:16

== Reception ==
Jeffrey Bloomer of Slate wrote "The movie's puzzling score, by Danny Bensi and Saunder Jurriaans, pounds away at us with each new blow, as if this must turn into a literal horror movie for us to feel the weight of what we’re seeing." Marc Savlov of The Austin Chronicle called it as an "uneasy-listening score". Sandy Schaefer of Screen Rant noted that the score "does its part to enliven certain scenes and better bring out the emotions of any particular moment, yet sometimes their music almost clashes with the movie's otherwise downbeat sense of atmosphere." Anish Tamhaney of The Michigan Daily called it as a "perplexing score". David Ehrlich of IndieWire considered the score to be "sad and gorgeously febrile".

== Personnel ==
Credits adapted from liner notes:

- Music composer, producer and recording – Danny Bensi, Saunder Jurriaans
- Mixing – Phil McGowan
- Mastering – Pat Sullivan
- Music editor – Anastassios Filipos
- Music supervision – Linda Cohen
- Score transcription – Jordi Nus
- Design – Brian Porizek
- Cello – Alice Bacon, Melody Giron, Reenat Pinchas, Sam Quiggins
- Choir – MUSYCA Children's Choir
- Clarinet – Doug Wieselman
- Grand piano – Rachel Jimenez
- Piano – Rachel Jimenez
- Violin – Adriana Molello, Carolin Pook, Chiara Fasi, Delaney Stockli, Emily Holden, Francesca Dardani, Kiku Enomoto, Marandi Hostetter, Sarah Franklin
- Orchestra contractor – Adriana Molello
- Orchestra recording engineer – Robert Aceto

== Accolades ==
Award	Date of ceremony	Category	Nominee(s)	Result	Ref.
Golden Globe Awards	January 6, 2019	Best Original Song	"Revelation" – Leland, Troye Sivan and Jónsi	Nominated	
Hollywood Music in Media Awards	November 14, 2018	Best Original Song – Feature Film	"Revelation" – Leland, Troye Sivan and Jónsi	Nominated	
Houston Film Critics Society	January 3, 2019	Best Original Song	"Revelation" – Leland, Troye Sivan and Jónsi	Nominated	
Satellite Awards	February 17, 2019	Best Original Song	"Revelation" – Leland, Troye Sivan and Jónsi	Nominated	
