= Animal Arithmetic =

Single by Jónsi

from the album Go
- Released: 24 May 2010
- Recorded: 2009
- Genre: Pop
- Length: 3:19 (radio mix); 3:23 (album version)
- Label: EMI
- Songwriter: Jónsi
- Producers: Peter Katis, Jónsi, Alex Somers

Jónsi singles chronology
"Go Do" (2010)	"Animal Arithmetic" (2010)	"Revelation" (2018)

Music video
- "Animal Arithmetic" on YouTube

"Animal Arithmetic" is a song by the Icelandic singer Jónsi, the lead singer of Sigur Rós. "Animal Arithmetic" was released on 24 May 2010 as the second single from Jónsi's debut solo album, Go. The song features lyrics in both English and Icelandic. It is the only song by Jónsi to contain explicit language.

== Reception ==
The overall critical reception of the track was warm. Sam Shepherd, musicOMH reviewer, described "Animal Arithmetic" as a "joyful percussive stomp," while Tim Sendra of allmusic wrote that the song sounds "like the bubbling soundtrack to an awesome training montage in a film where pixies are training to battle fairies". Under the Radar and Delusions of Adequacy praised the track's "rapid-fire list of daily rituals highlight[ing] near ecclesiastical bliss in the mundane," while the latter also noted its "percussion that sounds like it was culled from a kitchen pantry." Paste Magazine's review noted that the track "this will probably be the track on the record that sends most listeners scrambling for the skip button" but nevertheless praised its playfulness and "clattering along at 120 mph with cymbals crashing." PopMatters stated that "Animal Arithmetic" is "one of the pair's [Jónsi's and Nico Muhly's] most impressive feats" and also that it "is a master study in balancing structure and chaos." Meanwhile, BBC Music were much less impressed with the song, stating that while being "perfectly agreeable," it "unexpectedly [gets] hijacked by a cacophonous onslaught of instruments."

== Track listing ==
Promotional CD single

All music and lyrics written by Jónsi.

1. "Animal Arithmetic" (radio mix) – 3:19
2. "Animal Arithmetic" (album version) – 3:23
3. "Animal Arithmetic" (instrumental) – 3:21
