= Klive =

Úlfur
- Also known as: Bitroid, Klive, Dataplex
- Born: Úlfur Hansson; 30 March 1988 (age 37); Luxembourg
- Genres: Electronic music, musique concrète, black metal
- Instruments: Synthesizer, electronics, laptop, Pd, Cycling '74, drum machine
- Labels: Western Vinyl, Figureight, Kimi Records, Mille Plateaux
- Website: http://ulfurhansson.com

Úlfur Hansson (born 1988) is an Icelandic electronic musician. Úlfur's first album, Sweaty Psalms, was released in May 2008. It was recorded and written over two years, self-released but distributed by Kimi Records locally. The record received outstanding reviews in local newspapers and webzines, for example, being voted the seventh best album of 2008 by rjominn.is. In promotion of the album, Klive toured Germany in 2009, opening for Kira Kira. Following the success of Klive's first album, Úlfur signed a record deal with newly reformed Mille Plateaux.

Úlfur Hansson has worked closely with his sibling and visual artist, Elín Hansdóttir, over the years. He also plays bass guitar with the Icelandic band Swords of Chaos.

Since April 2010, Úlfur Hansson has been a touring member of Jónsi (Jón Þór Birgisson of Sigur Rós) international promotional tour of Jónsi's album Go.

== Selected discography ==
- Batsugun Returns (as Bitroid) – 2006, self-released.
- Sweaty Psalms (as Klive) – 2008, self-released.
- The End is as Near As Your Teeth (w/ Swords of Chaos). Kimi Records, 2010.
- Sweaty Psalms (as Klive) – 2010, European version released on Mille Plateaux.
- White Mountain (as Úlfur) 2012.

== Collaboration projects ==
- Drift – 2007. Audio work for Elín Hansdóttir's installation in ZKM (Karlsruhe, Germany).
- Helix – 2008. A happening with Elín Hansdóttir. Reykjavík, Iceland).
- Path – 2008. Audio work for Elín Hansdóttir's installation in Listasafn Íslands (Reykjavík, Iceland) and Gallery Maribel Lopez (Berlin, Germany).
- Each Thousand Years But a Day – 2009. Musical composition for a 7-piece brass band performed at Ryan Parteka's opening in Reykjavík Art Museum.
- Pretty Bassic – 2009. Music for Margrét Bjarnadóttir and Saga Sigurðardóttir's dance piece for Reykjavik Dance Festival.
- Universolo – 2010. Audio work for Elín Hansdóttir's installation in Unosolo Project Space (Rome, Italy).
