= Briana Marela =

American singer

- Origin: Seattle, Washington, United States
- Genres: Indie rock
- Labels: SC Distribution
- Website: Official website

Briana Marela Lizárraga is an American musician. Previously from Seattle, Marela is now based in Oakland, California.

== Biography ==
Marela grew up in Seattle and studied music technology while attending college in Olympia, Washington. She independently released two albums before signing with Jagjaguwar Records, who issued All Around Us in 2015. Alex Somers produced the album.

Her fourth album, Call It Love, was released in August 2017. Following the release of this album, Marela was dropped by Jagjaguwar, and she took time off from active performance as a solo artist while a student in the MFA program at Mills College. In April 2020, Marela's father, who lived in Peru, died, and due to the effects of the COVID-19 pandemic, she was unable to visit his home country for more than a year; these experiences influenced the content of her fifth album, You Are a Wave, which was released in September 2022.

== Discography ==
- Water Ocean Lake (2010)
- Speak From Your Heart (2012)
- All Around Us (Jagjaguwar, 2015)
- Call It Love (Jagjaguwar, 2017)
- You Are a Wave (Self-released, 2022)
