= Call It Love (album) =

Studio album by Briana Marela
- Released: August 4, 2017
- Length: 41:36
- Label: Jagjaguwar

Briana Marela chronology
All Around Us (2015)	Call It Love (2017)

Professional ratings
Aggregate scores
Source	Rating
Metacritic	70/100
Review scores
Source	Rating
AllMusic	3.5/5 stars
The A.V. Club	B-
Exclaim!	6/10

Call It Love is the fourth studio album by American musician Briana Marela. It was released in August 2017 under Jagjaguwar.

== Track listing ==
No.	Title	Length
1.	"Be in Love"	4:27
2.	"Give Me Your Love"	4:09
3.	"I'm Sorry"	4:46
4.	"He Knows"	4:21
5.	"Quit"	3:31
6.	"Feel What I Feel"	2:42
7.	"Last Time"	3:43
8.	"Call It Love"	4:15
9.	"Farthest Shore"	4:27
10.	"Rise"	5:15

== Accolades ==
Publication	Accolade	Rank	Ref.
Earbuddy	Top 100 Albums of 2017	39	
