= Lost & Found (Jónsi & Alex album) =

Studio album by Jónsi & Alex
- Released: 11 October 2019
- Recorded: 2009–2019
- Genre: Ambient
- Length: 64:17
- Label: Krúnk
- Producer: Jónsi & Alex

Jónsi & Alex chronology
Riceboy Sleeps (2009)	Lost & Found (2019)

Jónsi chronology
Dark Morph (2019)	Lost & Found (2019)	Dark Morph II (2020)

Lost & Found is the second studio album by ambient duo Jónsi & Alex, released digitally on 11 October 2019. The album was a surprise release to accompany the beginning of their North American tour celebrating the 10th anniversary release of Riceboy Sleeps. This is the final album before Jónsi and Alex's split less than a month after the album's release.

== Music ==
The album's music sounds similar to the music in its predecessor, Riceboy Sleeps, and includes many of the same samples. The songs "Boy" and "Stokkseyrar-Disa" seem to be reworkings of the tracks from "Boy 1904" and "Stokkseyri" from Riceboy Sleeps, with similar modulation and harmonic structure, but the overall direction of the tracks differs from the songs they are based on. Regarding the album, the band said,

Lost And Found is a sibling album to Riceboy Sleeps. It falls somewhere between what was, what is, and what will be. Tape experiments, modular synth processing, and acoustic soundscapes drift in and out of focus. Sound friends that you may have heard or seen before appear; familiar, but different. The album has no linear relationship to Riceboy Sleeps.... It treats Riceboy Sleeps as a place to begin and finds moments from that album to open up to new moments that at times give glimpses of places within Riceboy Sleeps and at other times put you somewhere entirely new.

— Alex Somers

== Track listing ==
1. "Hundslappadrifa" – 6:10
2. "Boy" – 7:51
3. "Stokkseyrar-Disa" – 18:10
4. "Sleeping Summer" – 11:29
5. "In The Sea (Drowned)" – 11:15
6. "Wind in Our Ears" – 9:25
