= Jónsi & Alex =

Musical group

- Also known as: Riceboy Sleeps
- Origin: Reykjavík, Iceland
- Genres: Ambient
- Years active: 2003–2019 (hiatus)
- Labels: Parlophone; EMI
- Members: Jónsi; Alex Somers

Jónsi & Alex is an Icelandic-American artistic collaboration between Jónsi and Alex Somers. They create ambient music as well as visual art. The music tends to be more ethereal and experimental than that of Sigur Rós, Jónsi's primary musical project.

== Visual art ==
Jónsi & Alex began as a Sigur Rós side project around 2003 under the name Riceboy Sleeps. On November 24, 2006, they released their first picture book with the same name as their project. One thousand hand-numbered editions were produced, and only available in Iceland. They released a second edition in July 2007 that was not hand-numbered.

To spread the word of the book's publishing, Somers and Jón held an art exhibition at Gallery Turpentine in Reykjavík, Iceland. In August 2007, they went to Arkansas to hold their first exhibit outside of Iceland. In October of the same year, they held a third exhibit at Melbourne International Arts Festival and were part of the Sequences Art Festival in Reykjavík.

== Music ==
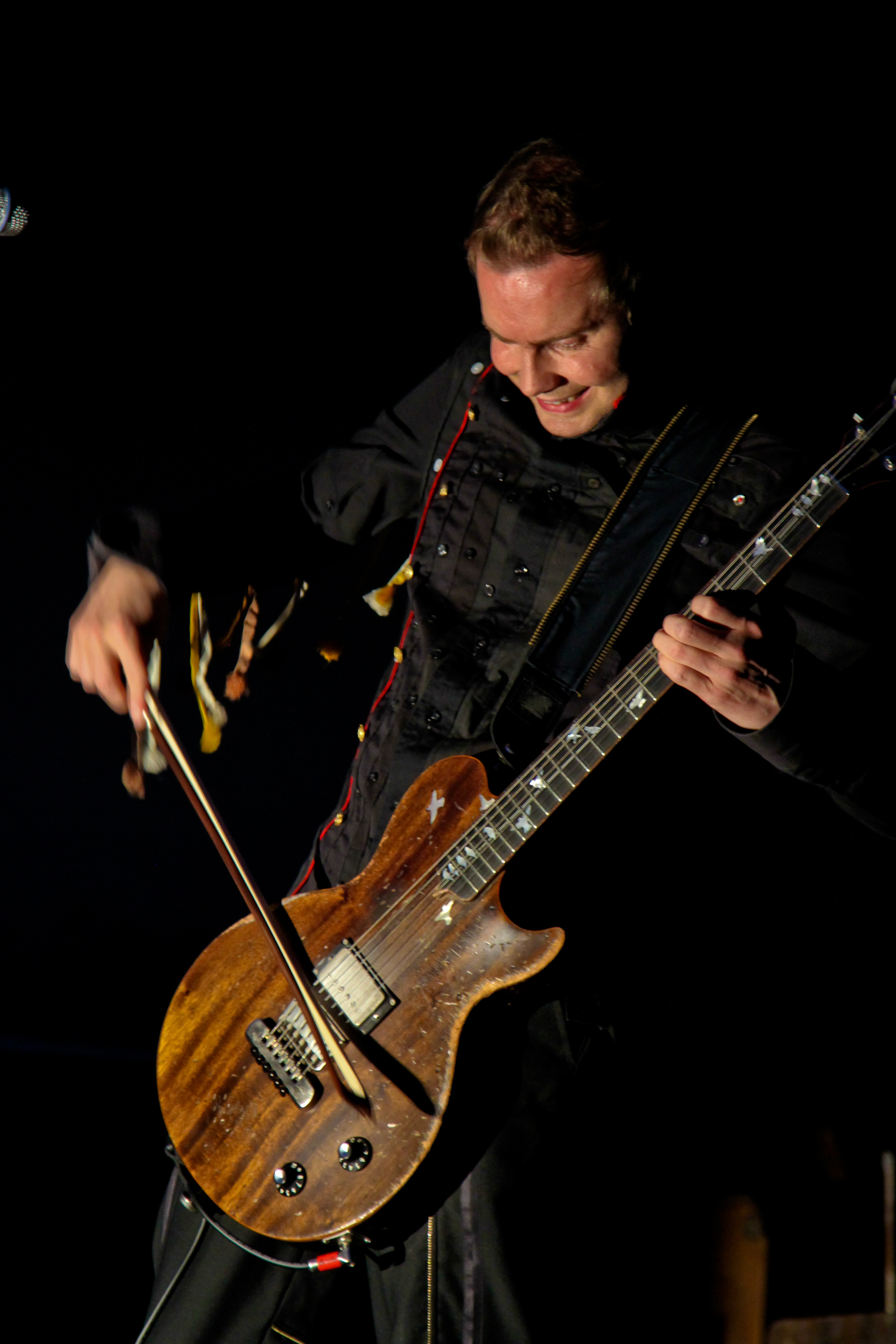
Jónsi performing at the Prospect Park Bandshell in Brooklyn, NYC.

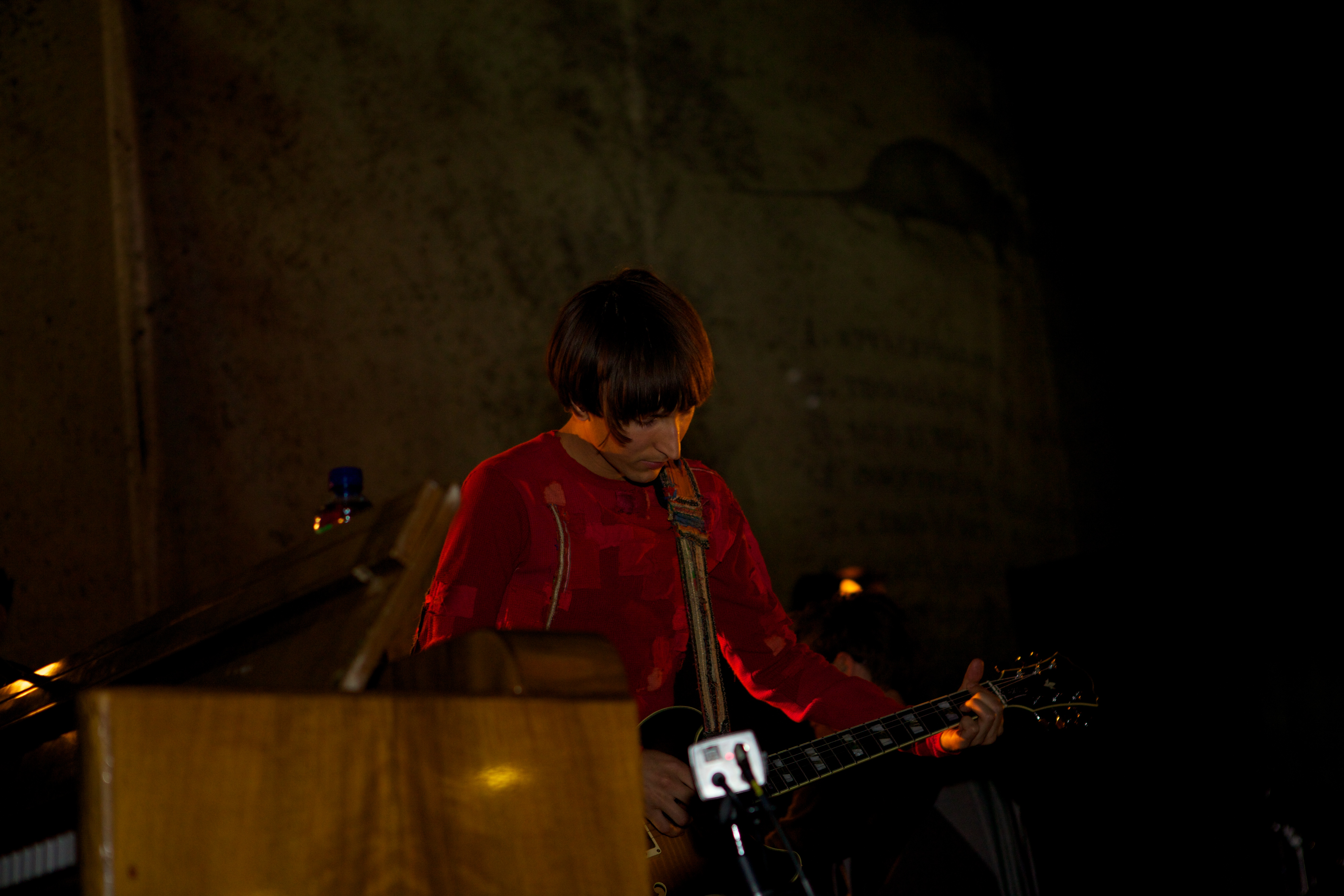
Alex Somers live @ HMV Forum (a.k.a. Mean Fiddler), Camden Town, London, 26 May 2010

The two have released two singles: "All the Big Trees" and "Daníell in the Sea". Their song "Stokkseyri" played during the fourth-season finale of the hit British show Skins.

They also contributed the song "Happiness" to the Dark Was the Night charity compilation album produced by Aaron and Bryce Dessner of The National. At that time, the duo were known as Riceboy Sleeps.

Their debut album Riceboy Sleeps was released in Europe on July 20, 2009.

Their song "Stokkseyri" was featured prominently in the series finale of Friday Night Lights. Their song "Boy 1904" was featured in series 5 of Waterloo Road and in the soundtrack to Captain Fantastic (2016).

In 2013, the two composed an original soundtrack as part of a tourism campaign for Western Australia. They also composed the score for the first season of the acclaimed WGN America drama, Manhattan, which premiered on July 27, 2014.

In 2019, to mark the 10th anniversary of Riceboy Sleeps, the duo embarked on a North American tour performing the album in full. To accompany the tour, they released their second album, Lost & Found, on October 11, 2019. The album was said to be a "sibling album" to Riceboy Sleeps.

== Discography ==
- Riceboy Sleeps (2009)
- Lost & Found (2019)

== See also ==
- List of ambient music artists
