= Revelation (song) =

Single by Troye Sivan and Jónsi

from the album Boy Erased
- Released: 18 October 2018
- Length: 3:51
- Songwriters: Troye Mellet; Brett McLaughlin; Jonsi Birgisson
- Producer: Leland

Troye Sivan singles chronology
"1999" (2018)	"Revelation" (2018)	"Somebody to Love" (2018)

Jónsi singles chronology
"Animal Arithmetic" (2010)	"Revelation" (2018)	"Exhale" (2020)

"Revelation" is a song by Australian singer-songwriter Troye Sivan and Icelandic musician Jónsi. In July 2018, the song was previewed during the trailer for the film Boy Erased, and released on 18 October 2018.

The song was nominated for the Golden Globe Award for Best Original Song at the 76th Golden Globe Awards, the Best Original Song – Feature Film award at the 9th Hollywood Music in Media Awards and a Satellite Award for Best Original Song at the 2018 Satellite Awards.

== Background ==
Sivan explained to Billboard that after reading the script, he was set on getting his music into the movie: "I was ready to sell my soul. I said, 'You can have any song that I've ever written, I'll write new ones, I'll do anything.'" Sivan wrote several unsolicited original songs that did not make it into the film, but director Joel Edgerton put in a request for Sivan to tackle a specific scene, where Jared (played by Lucas Hedges) has a pure interaction with another boy for the first time.

Sivan said: "Jónsi from Sigur Rós was working on some music for one scene where he had started this little piano melody, but he didn't really know where to go lyrically or melodically, so that's when Joel, Jónsi and I went for breakfast one morning and they talked to me about that specific scene, and I ended up writing the song later that day." Sivan explained to Billboard that "The idea of that person being a revelation in your life, where you can kind of do something that feels so natural and so right and be fine on the other side, that was a really potent thing in my head."

== Live performances ==
In October 2018, Sivan performed the song live on The Ellen DeGeneres Show, backed with a string quartet.

In November 2018, Sivan performed the song live on The Tonight Show Starring Jimmy Fallon.

== Reception ==
Joshua Bote from Billboard described the song as a "a divine, haunting ballad," saying, "Filled with reverb-heavy keys, creaky strings and cinematic, post-rock flourishes, Sivan sounds absolutely stunning on 'Revelation' as he sings about young, queer love as a form of freedom and revolution."

Randall Colburn from Consequence of Sound said "Buoyed by gentle piano and the kinds of swelling atmospherics central to Jónsi's work, the thoughtful, calming song achieves a kind of melancholic catharsis that's as hopeful as it is heartrending."

Mike Neid from Idolator called it a "stirring anthem with a powerful message".
