= Go Do =

Single by Jónsi

EP by Jónsi
- Released: 22 March 2010
- Recorded: Mid-2009 in Reykjavík, Iceland and Tarquin Studios, Connecticut, United States
- Genre: Post-rock
- Length: 13:46
- Label: EMI
- Producer: Peter Katis, Alex Somers, Jónsi

Jónsi singles chronology
Go Do (2010)	"Animal Arithmetic" (2010)

Music video
- "Go Do" on YouTube

Go Do is an extended play (EP) by the Icelandic singer Jónsi, the lead singer of Sigur Rós. Go Do was released on 22 March 2010 as the lead single from his debut solo album, Go. The EP was produced by American producer Peter Katis, Jónsi and his boyfriend, Alex Somers.

== Music ==
The song "Go Do" features "heavy" percussion, which was described by Brian Boyd in The Irish Times as "exuberant in its execution". The song also contains "jittery electronics and fluttering flutes".

== Video ==
The video for "Go Do" was directed by the Icelandic duo árni & kinski, who had previously directed videos for Sigur Rós. It was recorded over the 2009–10 Christmas and New Year period in Iceland. The video features Jónsi wearing sewn-on rags and feathers, and is described on MTV's website as releasing his "natural weirdness".

== Reception ==
British music magazine Clash said that the music "alternately flutters and bangs" and went on to say that it would not alienate Sigur Rós fans as it was a "semi-logical progression of their sound". The California Chronicle said that "if ever a track is going to make you celebrate the day, this is it" and described it as "A pounding, soaring, seize the moment song." Allmusic, reviewing the song along with "Animal Arithmetic", said that it sounded like "the bubbling soundtrack to an awesome training montage in a film where pixies are training to battle fairies."

The song reached number six in the singer's native Iceland, number twenty-seven on the Ultratop chart of the Flanders region of Belgium and number seven on the Japan Hot 100. It also climbed to number 127 on the UK Singles Chart.

The song was used in advertisements for the film The Social Network, Google Chrome, Foxtel, the 2011 Ford Explorer, and the Microsoft Windows Phone 8.

== Track listing ==
All tracks written by Jónsi.

1. "Go Do" – 4:40
2. "Kolniður" – 3:54
3. "Grow Till Tall" – 5:12

== Charts ==
Annual chart rankings for "Go Do"
Chart (2010)	Rank
Japan Adult Contemporary (Billboard)	48
