= Captain Fantastic (film) =

2016 American drama film by Matt Ross

- Theatrical release poster
- Directed by: Matt Ross
- Written by: Matt Ross
- Produced by: Nimitt Mankad; Monica Levinson; Jamie Patricof; Shivani Rawat; Lynette Howell Taylor
- Starring: Viggo Mortensen; Frank Langella; Kathryn Hahn; Steve Zahn
- Cinematography: Stéphane Fontaine
- Edited by: Joseph Krings
- Music by: Alex Somers
- Production companies: Electric City Entertainment; ShivHans Pictures
- Distributed by: Bleecker Street (United States); Entertainment One (International)
- Release dates: January 23, 2016 (Sundance); July 8, 2016 (United States)
- Running time: 118 minutes
- Country: United States
- Language: English
- Budget: $5 million
- Box office: $22.8 million

Captain Fantastic is a 2016 American comedy-drama film written and directed by Matt Ross and starring Viggo Mortensen, Frank Langella, Kathryn Hahn, and Steve Zahn. The story centers on a family forced by circumstances to reintegrate into society after living in isolation for a decade.

The film had its world premiere at the Sundance Film Festival on January 23, 2016. It was screened in the Un Certain Regard section at the 2016 Cannes Film Festival. It was theatrically released on July 8, 2016, by Bleecker Street. It was chosen by the National Board of Review as one of the top ten independent films of 2016 and Mortensen was nominated for the Golden Globe, the BAFTA Award, and the Academy Award for Best Actor. The film was released with a soundtrack.

== Plot ==
Ben Cash, his wife Leslie, and their six children live an isolated existence on ten acres in the mountainous Washington wilderness. They are left-wing anarchist activists disillusioned by capitalism and American life, who choose to instill survivalist skills, left-wing politics and philosophy into their children.

The children are encouraged to develop critical-thinking skills and physical fitness, and are taught self-reliance with limited reliance on modern technology. They are raised to live in close proximity to nature, given individual names, and celebrate Noam Chomsky's birthday rather than Christmas. They are exposed to a range of college-level literature and demonstrate advanced intellectual abilities for their ages. However, their limited interaction with the outside world contributes to difficulties in socializing with people beyond their immediate family.

Ben has been raising the children on his own while Leslie is hospitalized in New Mexico for bipolar disorder, away from her family and near her wealthy elitist parents. She dies by suicide while undergoing treatment, and Ben learns that her father, Jack Bertrang, plans to hold a Christian burial, despite Leslie being a philosophical Buddhist who abhorred religion. Ben tries to persuade Jack to honor Leslie's wish to be cremated, to no avail, and Jack forbids Ben to attend the funeral, threatening to have him arrested if he comes. Ben initially decides not to go and prevents his children from doing so, but then changes his mind, driving his children across the country in a repurposed school bus.

The family briefly stays at the home of Ben's sister, Harper. She and her husband try to convince Ben that the children should attend school to receive a conventional education; Ben quizzes Harper's children and his children on various topics, such as the Bill of Rights, showing that his children are far better educated than Harper's.

Ben arrives at Leslie's funeral with their children against Jack's wishes and reads her will, which instructs her family to cremate her and flush her ashes down a toilet, in the hopes of convincing Jack to honor her wishes, only for Jack to have him forcibly removed from the church. Angered by Jack's refusal to honor Leslie's wishes, Ben follows the funeral procession to the cemetery, planning to intervene, despite a police presence and Jack's threat to have him arrested. Ben only relents at his children's insistence that they cannot lose both of their parents.

After this, some of Ben's children start to doubt him and his parenting skills, with his second eldest son and middle child Rellian accusing him of failing to treat Leslie's mental health, and eldest son Bodevan accusing him of not equipping them for the real world, showing him acceptance letters from several top Ivy League colleges to which Leslie had helped him apply.

Ben finds a note from Rellian, who has run away to live with his grandparents. When Ben visits Jack to get Rellian back, he refuses to go back with him, wanting to stay with his grandparents. Jack berates Ben and accuses him of child abuse, telling him he is filing for custody of all of Ben's children. When one of Ben's older twin daughters Vespyr tries to clandestinely exfiltrate Rellian from their grandparents on Ben's orders, she falls from the roof and narrowly avoids breaking her neck. Ben, shocked and guilty when the hospital tells him how close she was to death, allows Jack to take his children. Jack assures Ben he's making the right choice by leaving his children in their care, and Ben drives off in his bus, feeling sad without his children. However, the children dislike living in their grandparents' capitalist environment and miss their father, so have stowed away in the family bus, and reconcile with their father.

The children desire to honor Leslie's final wishes, and persuade Ben to help them. Exhuming her corpse, they burn it on a funeral pyre by the ocean, and perform a singing ceremony in her memory. As per her wishes, they then flush her ashes down an airport toilet. Bodevan then leaves the family to travel to Namibia, while the rest return home. The final scene shows the children eating breakfast around the kitchen table with their father and getting ready for the school bus.

== Cast ==
- Viggo Mortensen as Ben Cash
- Frank Langella as Jack Bertrang
- George MacKay as Bodevan Cash
- Samantha Isler as Kielyr Cash
- Annalise Basso as Vespyr Cash
- Nicholas Hamilton as Rellian Cash
- Shree Crooks as Zaja Cash
- Charlie Shotwell as Nai Cash
- Ann Dowd as Abigail Bertrang
- Erin Moriarty as Claire McCune
- Missi Pyle as Ellen McCune
- Kathryn Hahn as Harper
- Steve Zahn as Dave
- Trin Miller as Leslie Abigail Cash
- Elijah Stevenson as Justin
- Teddy Van Ee as Jackson

== Production ==
The film was conceived by its writer and director, Matt Ross, as he began questioning the choices he and his wife were making as parents. He wondered what would happen if he were "completely present" in his children's lives while noting that modern technology had made that difficult. In making the film Ross also took autobiographical moments from his own life, notably being raised in what he termed as "alternative-living communities".

Viggo Mortensen was cast in February 2014. That June, it was announced that George MacKay, Annalise Basso, Samantha Isler, Nicholas Hamilton, Shree Crooks and newcomer Charlie Shotwell had also been cast. Much of the rest of the cast joined in July and August.

Principal photography on the film commenced in July 2014, in Western Washington, with additional photography in Portland, Oregon, and Albuquerque, New Mexico.

== Release ==
In July 2014, eOne Entertainment acquired international distribution rights to the film. In August 2014, it was announced that Bleecker Street would distribute the film in the United States. The film had its world premiere at the 2016 Sundance Film Festival on January 23, 2016. The film was released on July 8, 2016. The film was aired in the Un Certain Regard section at the 2016 Cannes Film Festival, with Matt Ross winning the Best Director prize.

== Reception ==
=== Box office ===
Captain Fantastic grossed $5.9 million in the United States and Canada and $15.4 million in other territories for a worldwide total of $21.3 million, against a production budget of $5 million.

=== Critical response ===
On review aggregator Rotten Tomatoes, the film has an approval rating of 82% based on 228 reviews, with an average rating of 7.10/10. The site's critical consensus reads, "Captain Fantastic's thought-provoking themes—and an absorbing starring turn from Viggo Mortensen—add up to an above-average family drama with unexpected twists." On Metacritic, the film holds a score of 72 out of 100, based on 36 critics, indicating "generally favorable" reviews. It received a ten-minute standing ovation at Cannes.

Alonso Duralde of TheWrap gave the film a positive review, saying, "The movie really belongs to Mortensen, who allows Ben to be exasperating, arrogant, and impatient but also warm, loving, and caring. He's a tough but adoring father, a grieving widower and a passionate defender of his wife's final wishes, and Mortensen plays all these notes, and more with subtlety and grace." Peter Debruge of Variety gave the film a positive review, saying "Boasting half a dozen impressive youth performances alongside a leading role that takes full advantage of Mortensen's own sensitive, back-to-nature spirit, Captain Fantastic easily ranks among the most polished and relatable of this year's Sundance offerings."

A negative review from The Guardian's Peter Bradshaw states, "There's a meaty whiff of phony-baloney in this fatuous and tiresome movie, replete with forced emotional crises and wrong notes, topped off with an excruciatingly unearned, sentimental ending. It's a low-cal version of Peter Weir's 1986 movie The Mosquito Coast, starring someone who is essentially a cross between Charles Manson and Captain von Trapp."

Sheila O'Malley of RogerEbert.com believes "It's the attitude of the film that's the problem" and it "could have used a lot more skepticism." While praising the cast, she writes that the film "treats the situation (and Ben) so uncritically and so sympathetically that there is a total disconnect between what is actually onscreen and what Ross thinks is onscreen".

=== Accolades ===
List of awards and nominations
| Award | Date of ceremony | Category | Recipient(s) | Result | Ref. |
|---|---|---|---|---|---|
| AARP Annual Movies for Grownups Awards | February 6, 2017 | Best Actor | Viggo Mortensen | Nominated | |
| Academy Awards | February 26, 2017 | Best Actor | Viggo Mortensen | Nominated | |
| British Academy Film Awards | February 12, 2017 | Best Actor in a Leading Role | Viggo Mortensen | Nominated | |
| Bucheon International Fantastic Film Festival | July 31, 2016 | Save Energy, Save Earth Film Award | Captain Fantastic | Won | |
| Cannes Film Festival | May 22, 2016 | Un Certain Regard - Prize for Best Director | Matt Ross | Won | |
| Cannes Film Festival | May 22, 2016 | Prix Un Certain Regard | Captain Fantastic | Nominated | |
| Costume Designers Guild | February 21, 2017 | Excellence in Contemporary Film | Courtney Hoffman | Nominated | |
| Critics' Choice Awards | December 11, 2016 | Best Actor in a Comedy | Viggo Mortensen | Nominated | |
| Deauville American Film Festival | September 11, 2016 | Audience Award | Captain Fantastic | Won | |
| Deauville American Film Festival | September 11, 2016 | Jury Prize | Captain Fantastic | Won | |
| Deauville American Film Festival | September 11, 2016 | Grand Prix | Captain Fantastic | Nominated | |
| Dorian Awards | January 26, 2017 | Unsung Film of the Year | Captain Fantastic | Nominated | |
| Evening Standard British Film Awards | December 8, 2016 | Best Supporting Actor | George MacKay | Nominated | |
| Florida Film Critics Circle | December 23, 2016 | Best Actor | Viggo Mortensen | Nominated | |
| Golden Globe Awards | January 8, 2017 | Best Actor – Motion Picture Drama | Viggo Mortensen | Nominated | |
| Houston Film Critics Society | January 6, 2017 | Best Actor | Viggo Mortensen | Nominated | |
| Houston Film Critics Society | January 6, 2017 | Best Poster | Captain Fantastic | Nominated | |
| Independent Spirit Awards | February 25, 2017 | Best Male Lead | Viggo Mortensen | Nominated | |
| IndieWire Critics Poll | December 19, 2016 | Best Actor | Viggo Mortensen | 8th place | |
| Karlovy Vary International Film Festival | July 9, 2016 | Audience Award | Captain Fantastic | Won | |
| Make-Up Artists and Hair Stylists Guild | February 19, 2017 | Feature-Length Motion Picture – Contemporary Make-Up | Akemi Hart and Karen McDonald | Nominated | |
| Nantucket Film Festival | June 27, 2016 | Audience Award | Captain Fantastic | Runner-up | |
| National Board of Review | January 4, 2017 | Top Ten Independent Film | Captain Fantastic | Won | |
| Online Film Critics Society | January 3, 2017 | Best Actor | Viggo Mortensen | Nominated | |
| Rome Film Festival | October 22, 2016 | BNL People's Choice Award | Captain Fantastic | Won | |
| San Diego Film Critics Society | December 12, 2016 | Best Actor | Viggo Mortensen | Runner-up | |
| Satellite Awards | February 19, 2017 | Best Film | Captain Fantastic | Nominated | |
| Satellite Awards | February 19, 2017 | Best Actor | Viggo Mortensen | Won (Note: Tied with Andrew Garfield for Hacksaw Ridge) | |
| Satellite Awards | February 19, 2017 | Best Original Screenplay | Matt Ross | Nominated | |
| Satellite Awards | February 19, 2017 | Best Costume Design | Courtney Hoffman | Nominated | |
| Seattle International Film Festival | June 12, 2016 | Golden Space Needle Award for Best Film | Captain Fantastic | Won | |
| Screen Actors Guild Awards | January 29, 2017 | Outstanding Performance by a Male Actor in a Leading Role | Viggo Mortensen | Nominated | |
| Screen Actors Guild Awards | January 29, 2017 | Outstanding Performance by a Cast in a Motion Picture | The cast of Captain Fantastic | Nominated | |
| St. Louis Gateway Film Critics Association | December 18, 2016 | Best Actor | Viggo Mortensen | Nominated | |

== See also ==
- List of films dealing with anarchism
