= Go (Jónsi album) =

Studio album by Jónsi
- Released: 31 March 2010
- Recorded: Summer 2009 at Jónsi's house in Reykjavík, and at Tarquin Studios, in Connecticut
- Genres: Post-rock, baroque pop
- Length: 40:17
- Labels: XL Recordings, Parlophone
- Producers: Jónsi, Alex Somers, Peter Katis

Jónsi chronology
Riceboy Sleeps (2009)	Go (2010)	We Bought a Zoo (2011)

Singles from Go
- 1. "Go Do" Released: 21 March 2010; 2. "Animal Arithmetic" Released: 24 May 2010

Go is the debut studio album by Icelandic musician Jónsi, frontman of the post-rock band Sigur Rós. The album was released on 5 April 2010, through XL Recordings, as reported by a downloadable track from the official site. The fourth track of the album, "Boy Lilikoi", was released for free from Jónsi's website, available to those subscribing to the website's mailing list.

The album features predominantly acoustic music and string arrangements from composer Nico Muhly. The album was co-produced by Alex Somers, Peter Katis and Jónsi himself, during summer 2009, in Reykjavík and Connecticut. A worldwide tour across North America and Europe also took place upon the album's release from April–May 2010, featuring Jónsi performing songs from the album and a "unique, cinematic" performance stage designed by 59 Productions.

"Kolniður" was featured at the end of the Criminal Minds sixth-season episode "Lauren" and in a trailer for Real Steel. It also featured at the end of the first-season finale of the reality series Flying Wild Alaska. "Around Us" was included on the FIFA 11 and FIFA 23 soundtrack and the trailer for the Disney dub of The Secret World of Arrietty.

"Tornado" was featured in the closing scene and end credits of the film Disconnect.

== Reception ==
Professional ratings
Aggregate scores
Source	Rating
AnyDecentMusic?	7.7/10
Metacritic	76/100
Review scores
Source	Rating
AllMusic	4/5 stars
The A.V. Club	A−
The Daily Telegraph	4/5 stars
Entertainment Weekly	B+
The Guardian	3/5 stars
The Irish Times	4/5 stars
Pitchfork	8.1/10
Q	2/5 stars
Rolling Stone	3.5/5 stars
Spin	8/10

Go has received mostly positive reviews from critics, scoring a 76/100 on the music review aggregator website Metacritic. Most reviews praise Muhly's precise arrangements and Jónsi's flighty vocals, while a few lukewarm reviews discuss the album's lack of cohesion. The album has reached number twenty on the UK Albums Chart, number twenty-three on the Billboard 200 in the United States, number six on the Belgian (Flanders) Ultratop chart, number thirty-one on the Swiss Albums Top 100, number seventy-four on the Italian Music Chart and number eighty-four on the Dutch Mega Album Top 100.

== Track listing ==
1. "Go Do" – 4:41
2. "Animal Arithmetic" – 3:24
3. "Tornado" – 4:15
4. "Boy Lilikoi" – 4:30
5. "Sinking Friendships" – 4:42
6. "Kolniður" – 3:56
7. "Around Us" – 5:18
8. "Grow till Tall" – 5:21
9. "Hengilás" – 4:15

Japanese bonus tracks

10. "Sinking Friendships" (acoustic) – 4:00
11. "Tornado" (acoustic) – 3:57

== Personnel ==
- Jón Þór Birgisson – vocals, sampler, guitar, piano, ukulele, glockenspiel
- Samuli Kosminen – drums, percussion, kalimba, harp
- Nico Muhly – piano, celesta, glockenspiel, string arrangement, brass arrangement, wind arrangement
- Alex Somers – guitar, piano, celesta, glockenspiel, sampler

=== Additional musicians ===
- Hideaki Aomori – clarinet
- Edward Burns – bassoon
- Christa Robinson – oboe, English horn
- Alexandra Sopp – flutes
- William Lang – bass trombone
- David Nelson – trombone
- David Byrd-Marrow, Kate Sheeran – French horn
- Caleb Burhans, Courtney Orlando – violin
- Nadia Sirota, John Pickford Richards – viola
- Clarice Jenson, Brian Snow – cello
- Logan Coale – double bass

=== Technical ===
- Jón Þór Birgisson – writer, producer
- Alex Somers – producer
- Peter Katis – producer, engineer
- Greg Giorgio – assistant engineer

== Charts ==
Chart (2010)	Peak position
Australian Albums (ARIA)	64
Belgian Albums (Ultratop Flanders)	6
Belgian Albums (Ultratop Wallonia)	37
Dutch Albums (Album Top 100)	84
French Albums (SNEP)	86
German Albums (Offizielle Top 100)	100
Italian Albums (FIMI)	74
Swedish Albums (Sverigetopplistan)	35
Swiss Albums (Schweizer Hitparade)	31
UK Albums (Official Charts)	20
US Billboard 200	23
