= Riceboy Sleeps (album) =

Studio album by Jónsi & Alex
- Released: 20 July 2009
- Recorded: 2009
- Genre: Ambient
- Length: 68:00
- Labels: Parlophone, EMI
- Producers: Jónsi & Alex

Jónsi chronology
Riceboy Sleeps (2009)	Go (2010)

Professional ratings
Aggregate scores
Source	Rating
Metacritic	(73/100)
Review scores
Source	Rating
AllMusic	4/5 stars
The Arts Section	(Positive)
Rockfeedback	3/5 stars
The A.V. Club	(B)
Drowned in Sound	(6/10)
Metro	4/5 stars
NME	(2/10)
OMM	4/5 stars
Pitchfork	(5.3/10)
Planet Sound	(5/10)
Spin	3/5 stars
The Sunday Times	4/5 stars
The People's News	5/5 stars
The Independent	(Positive)

Riceboy Sleeps is the debut studio album by ambient duo Jónsi & Alex, released on 20 July 2009. The album is a collaboration between Sigur Rós vocalist Jón Þór Birgisson and partner Alex Somers which features acoustic instrumental music alongside a string quartet, Amiina, and the Kópavogsdætur Choir.

== Song information ==
"Happiness" first appeared on the 2009 AIDS benefit album Dark Was the Night, produced by the Red Hot Organization.

Videos exist for "All the Big Trees" and "Daníell in the Sea" which can be found on the duo's official website, along with an electronic press kit that includes making-of information and recipes.

"Boy 1904" uses a recording of the last known castrato singer.

== Track listing ==
1. "Happiness" – 9:18
2. "Atlas Song" – 8:30
3. "Indian Summer" – 9:10
4. "Stokkseyri" – 7:08
5. "Boy 1904" – 5:09
6. "All the Big Trees" – 5:51
7. "Daníell in the Sea" – 6:54
8. "Howl" – 8:22
9. "Sleeping Giant" – 6:41

== Charts ==
Chart (2009)	Peak position
Belgium (Flanders) Ultratop	13
Belgium (Wallonia) Ultratop	100
UK Albums Chart	66
Billboard Top Independent Albums	47
Billboard Heatseekers	13
Billboard Top New Age Albums	1

== Special editions ==
A limited edition of 3500 sets was released, containing the full CD album Riceboy Sleeps, the All Animals bonus CD, MP3 downloads of both Riceboy Sleeps and All Animals, a Riceboy Sleeps art book, a 40 pages coloring book with 6 pencils and a badge. Despite the limited edition selling out at the end of 2009, a few were still sold in the spring of 2011 via the duo's official website.

All Animals EP
No.	Title	Length
1.	"Chapter One"	20:19
2.	"Chapter Two"	1:41
3.	"Chapter Three"	11:04
