= Alex Somers =

American visual artist and musician

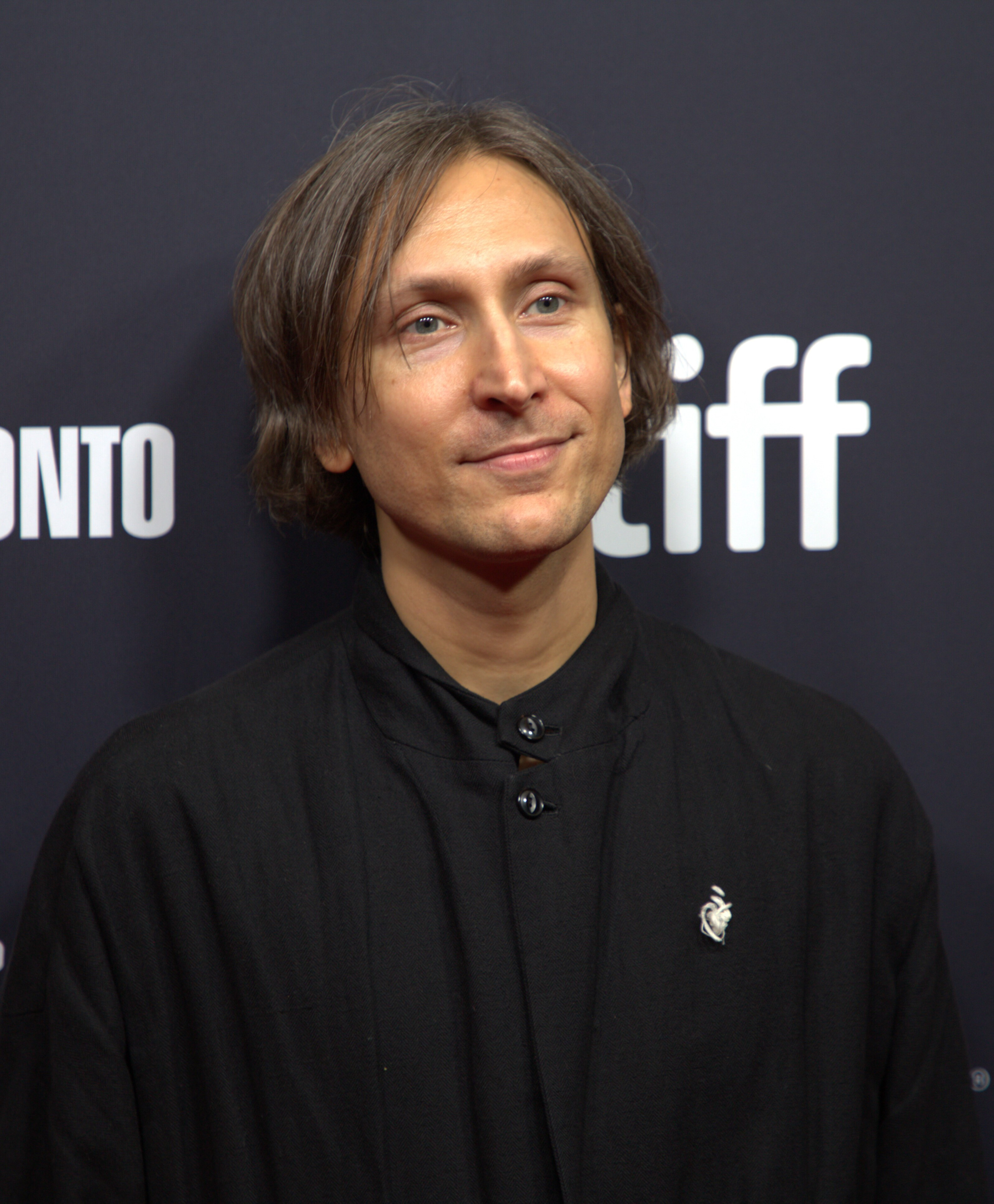
- Somers in 2025 at TIFF.
- Born: March 7, 1984 (age 42); Baltimore, Maryland, U.S.
- Education: Berklee College of Music; Listaháskóli Íslands
- Occupations: Visual artist; musician
- Website: alexsomers.com

Alex Somers (born March 7, 1984) is an American visual artist and musician from Baltimore, Maryland, who attended Berklee College of Music and Listaháskóli Íslands. Somers lives and works in Los Angeles. Previously he ran a recording studio in downtown Reykjavík where he produced, engineered, and mixed since 2010.

He and his former partner Jónsi, with whom he split in 2019, produce music and visual art under the name Jónsi & Alex. The pair have released an album and a picture book, both titled Riceboy Sleeps. Jónsi and Somers have also collaborated on Jónsi's solo project. Somers co-produced and played instruments on Jónsi's album Go. He then joined Jónsi in his five-piece live band, playing guitar and keyboards for the world tour in support of Go. Somers has produced and mixed a large number of records, including those of Sigur Rós, Jónsi, Julianna Barwick, Briana Marela, Death Vessel, Sin Fang, and Pascal Pinon.

Somers has been vegan since 2004, and a raw vegan since 2007.

== Sigur Rós ==
Alex Somers has worked as co-producer/mixer/engineer on several Sigur Rós releases, including Valtari, Kveikur, iTunes Festival: London 2013 and Brennisteinn EP. Somers has also worked with the band on their artwork/designs. Most notably on their album Takk..., which received Best Album Design at the 2006 Icelandic Music Awards.

In 2005–2006, Somers and Lukka Sigurðardóttir collaborated to form the design team "Toothfaeries", who made all of the official hand-made merchandise for Sigur Rós sold at the Takk... tour.

== Parachutes ==
Parachutes was a band formed in 2003 as a duo consisting of Alex Somers and Scott Alario. The band was named after a common term for dandelion seeds. They recorded in Alex's kitchen and living room, and commonly experimented using household objects and toys as instruments. After two albums and an EP, Parachutes stopped making music in 2008.

== Discography ==
=== Studio albums ===
- Siblings (2021)
- Siblings 2 (2021)

=== Collaborative albums ===
==== Jónsi & Alex (with Jónsi) ====
- Riceboy Sleeps (2009)
- All Animals (2009)
- Lost & Found (2019)

==== With Parachutes ====
- Parachutes (2003)
- Susy (2004)
- Tree Roots EP (2008)

=== As producer ===
- Rökkurró – Í Annan Heim (2010)
- Jónsi – Go (2010)
- Sigur Rós – Valtari (2012)
- Julianna Barwick – Nepenthe (2013)
- Sigur Rós – Kveikur (2013)
- Pascal Pinon – Twosomeness (2013)
- Sin Fang – Flowers (2013)
- Hymnalya – Hymns (2013)
- Tom Gallo – Continuation Day EP (2013)
- Death Vessel – Island Intervals (2014)
- Briana Marela – All Around Us (2015)
- Veroníque Vaka – Erlendis (2015)
- Gordi – Clever Disguise EP (2016)
- Sin Fang – Spaceland (2016)
- Sound Of Ceres – The Twin (2017)
- Gordi – Reservoir (2017)
- A. G. Cook – 7G (2020)
- Bob Dylan – Shadow Kingdom: The Early Songs of Bob Dylan (2021)
- Hyd – Clearing (2022)
- William Tyler – Time Indefinite (2025)

=== As film composer ===
- We Bought a Zoo (2011) (co-produced soundtrack with composer Jónsi)
- Manhattan (2014) (TV series, with Jónsi, Zoë Keating & Jeff Russo)
- Aloha (2015) (with Jónsi)
- Captain Fantastic (2016)
- Dawson City: Frozen Time (2016)
- Black Mirror: Hang the DJ (2017) (TV series, one episode)
- Hale Country This Morning, This Evening (2018) (with Scott Alario & Forest Kelley)
- Honey Boy (2019)
- Miss Americana (2020)
- Charm City Kings (2020)
- Here We Are: Notes for Living on Planet Earth (2020) (Animated short film)
- Audrey (2020)
- Together Together (2021)
- Alone Together (2022)
- Fresh (2022)
- Causeway (2022)
- Nickel Boys (2024) (with Scott Alario)
- Overcompensating (2025) (TV series)
- Rental Family (2025) (with Jónsi)
- Holland (2025)

== Album artwork ==
- Sigur Rós - Takk
- Sigur Rós - Glósoli
- Sigur Rós - Hoppípolla
- Sigur Rós - Saeglópur
- Helgi Hrafn Jónsson - For the Rest of My Childhood
- Sismo - Le Magica Exists
- Japanese Compilations 1,2 & 3
- Jónsi & Alex - Riceboy Sleeps
- Jónsi & Alex - All Animals
- Jónsi & Alex - Rain Down My Favorite Songs
- Hammock - Maybe They Will Sing for Us Tomorrow
- Leif Vollebekk - North Americana
