= Jónsi =

Icelandic musician (born 1975)

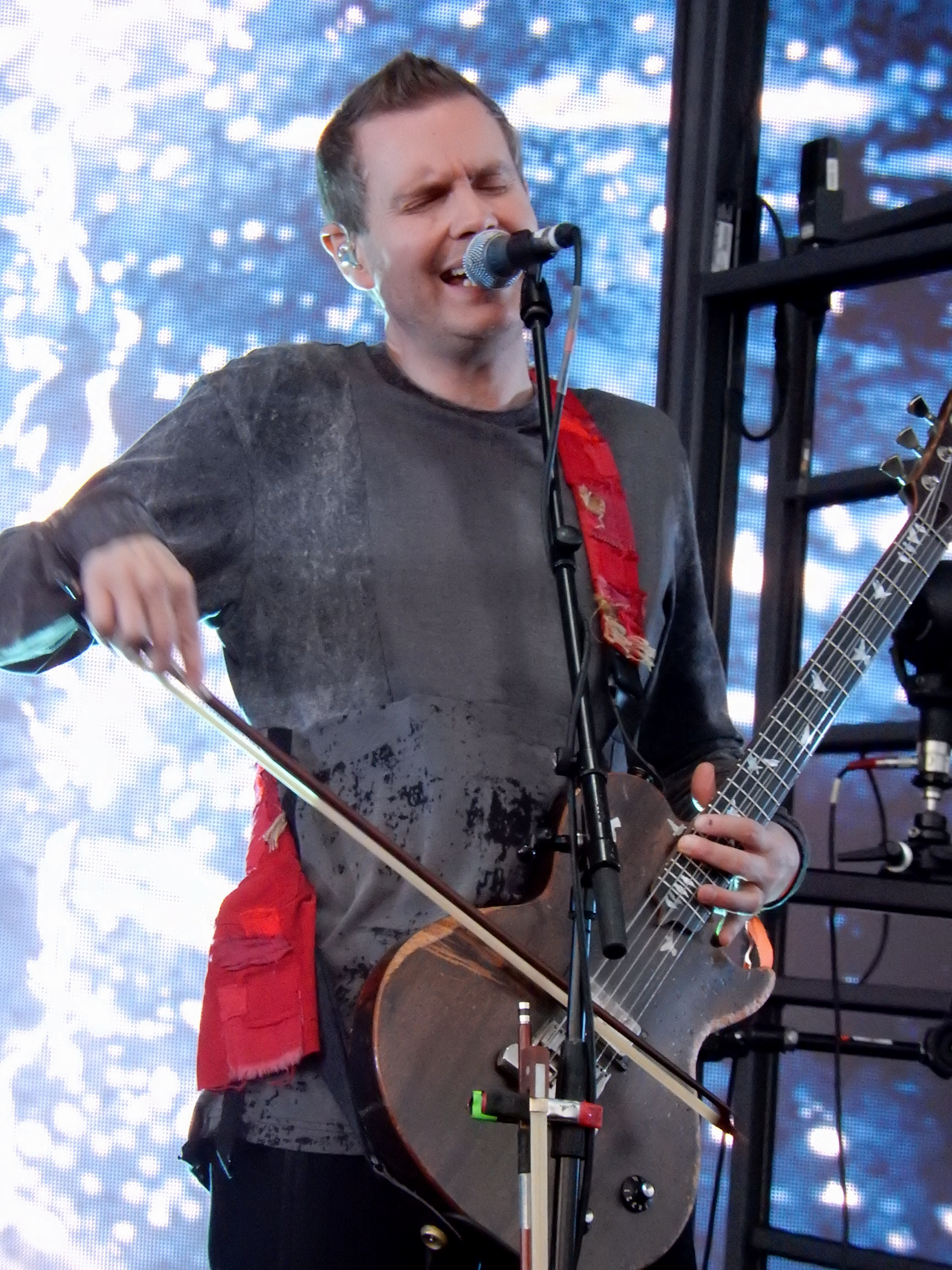
- Jónsi at the Citadel Festival, Victoria Park, London, 2016

Background information
- Born: Jón Þór Birgisson; 23 April 1975 (age 51)
- Origin: Reykjavík, Iceland
- Genres: Experimental rock; ambient; worldbeat; contemporary classical
- Instruments: Guitar; bass guitar; vocals; keyboards; banjo; ukulele; harmonica; sampler
- Years active: 1992–present
- Member of: Sigur Rós
- Website: jonsi.com

Jón Þór "Jónsi" Birgisson (pronounced [ˈjouːn ˈθouːr ˈpɪrcɪsɔn, ˈjounsɪ]; born 23 April 1975) is an Icelandic musician; he is the vocalist and multi-instrumentalist for the Icelandic post-rock band Sigur Rós. He is known for his use of a cello bow on guitar and his falsetto or countertenor voice.

Jónsi released his debut solo album Go on 5 April 2010. His second album, Shiver, was released on 2 October 2020. He released his third album Obsidian a year later in conjunction with an art exhibition of the same name. He has also collaborated with his ex-partner Alex Somers and has contributed to the scores for the films How to Train Your Dragon and We Bought a Zoo.

== Musical career ==
When Jónsi was 13 years old, he learned his first song on guitar, "Wrathchild" by Iron Maiden. Iron Maiden remains one of his favorite bands to this day. In 1995, Jónsi fronted a band called Bee Spiders, under the alias 'Jonny B'. He wore sunglasses on stage throughout their concerts. Bee Spiders received the 'most interesting band' award in 1995 in a contest for unknown bands called Músíktilraunir (Music Experimentations). The band played long rock songs and was compared to The Smashing Pumpkins. Jónsi also fronted a grunge band called Stoned around 1992–1993. He also uses the alias Frakkur to release his solo material, e.g., the contribution to Kitchen Motors Family Album, which marked the first release under this name.

Since 1994, Jónsi has been the singer and guitarist for Sigur Rós. To date, they have released eight studio albums.

Aside from his many years with Sigur Rós, Jónsi has collaborated with his ex-partner Alex Somers under the moniker Jónsi & Alex, releasing their album Riceboy Sleeps in 2009. In April 2010, Jónsi released his first solo album, Go, and began a multi-nation tour to promote the album from March through September across North America and Europe.

Jónsi's song "Around Us" was used for the American promotional trailer for Studio Ghibli's film The Secret World of Arriety and was also included in FIFA 11, the soundtrack by EA Sports.

His song "Tornado" was featured in Henry Alex Rubin's 2012 film Disconnect.

Jónsi also wrote the score for the 2012 Cameron Crowe film We Bought a Zoo.

"Boy Lilikoi" and instrumental versions of "Tornado", "Sinking Friendships", and "Around Us" were all included in the 2011 documentary This Is What Love in Action Looks Like.

Jónsi's song "Grow Till Tall" was used by the Bluecoats Drum and Bugle Corps in their 2017 competitive program Jagged Line. It was also featured in the trailer for the third installment of the Divergent series, Allegiant.

In 2018, Jonsi contributed an original song titled "Who Are You Thinking Of?" to the soundtrack of the feature film Boy Erased. He collaborated with Troye Sivan on the song "Revelation", also included on the soundtrack.

Jonsi is credited for music used in the 2025 film Rental Family.

=== How to Train Your Dragon franchise ===
Jónsi recorded "Sticks and Stones" for the score to the 2010 film How to Train Your Dragon, for which DreamWorks Animation released a music video on 17 December 2010. His song "Tornado" was featured in the arena show adaptation of this film. In 2014, Jónsi co-wrote the song "Where No One Goes" for the sequel, How to Train Your Dragon 2, with the film's music composer John Powell. He also co-wrote the melody for "For the Dancing and Dreaming". Jónsi additionally wrote a rough demo (entitled "Mama's Boy") for the film, which was eventually replaced by "Flying with Mother". He wrote and performed the song "Together from Afar" for the final installment of the franchise, How to Train Your Dragon: The Hidden World, in which he also provided the vocals for the track "The Hidden World".

=== Dark Morph ===
In 2019, it was announced that Jónsi and Swedish composer Carl Michael von Hausswolff had formed a new musical collaboration they were calling Dark Morph, and on 10 May 2019, they released their first album, also titled Dark Morph. The project "promises to explore the ramifications of ongoing environmental collapse to the oceans and its inhabitants." The album consists mainly of ambient sounds, often simulating the sounds of animals and nature, and contains very few actual melodies.

== Studio albums ==
=== Riceboy Sleeps (2009) ===
Jónsi and his ex-partner Alex Somers completed their first album together, Riceboy Sleeps, under the name Jónsi & Alex. The instrumental album was recorded in Iceland, played solely on acoustic instruments, and mixed in Hawaii. The album features appearances by the Icelandic string quartet Amiina and the Kópavogsdætur choir.

The 68-minute album includes nine tracks and was released on 20 July 2009 on Parlophone Records.

=== Go (2010) ===
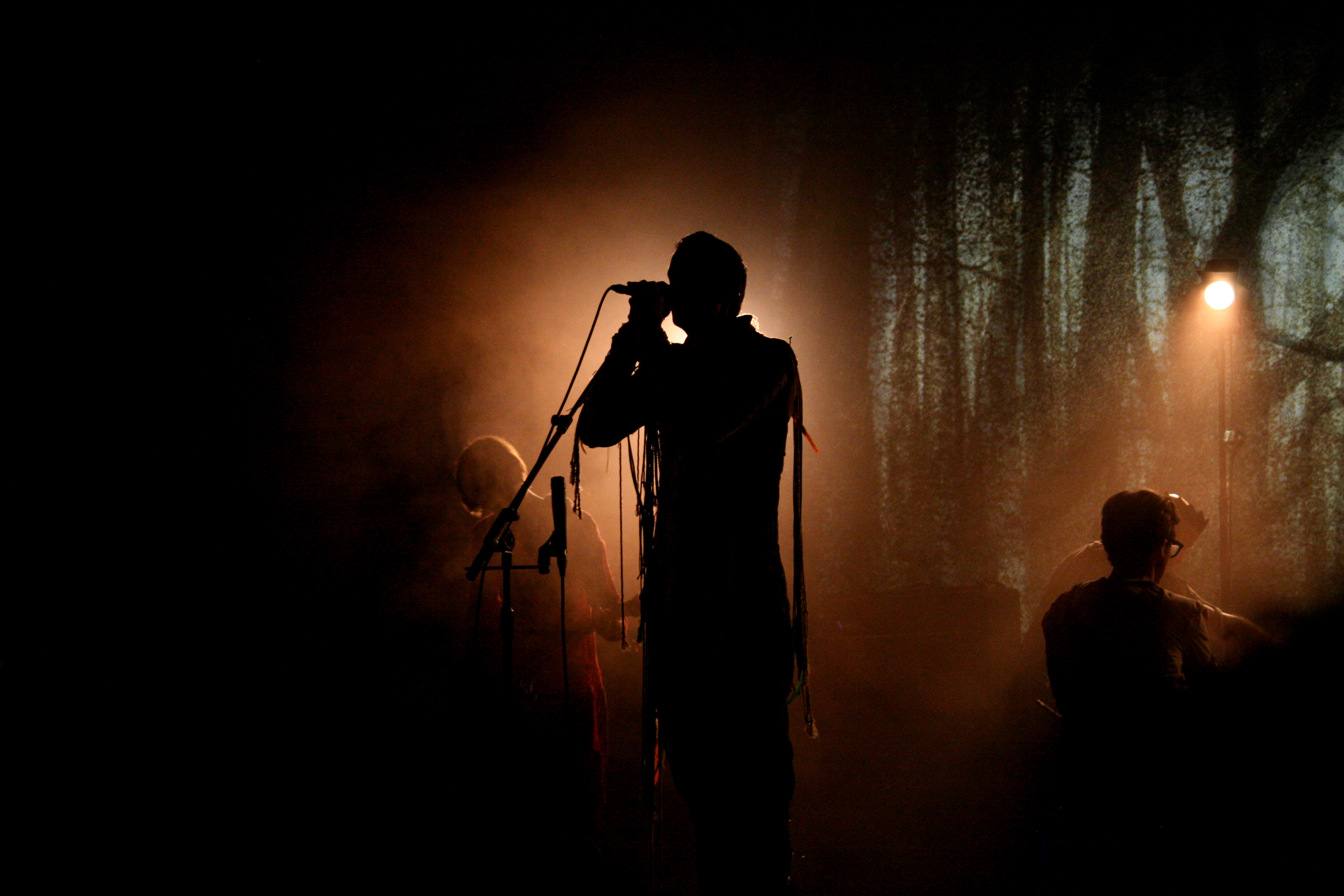
Jónsi live in Ferrara (22 July 2010)

A post that appeared on Jónsi's official site on 26 May 2009 stated that the artist was working on a solo album that would feature predominantly acoustic music and string arrangements from classical composer Nico Muhly. The album was set to be produced by Peter Katis (Interpol, The National, Tokyo Police Club).

On 4 December 2009, a free MP3 of the track "Boy Lilikoi" was made available to mailing-list subscribers through the website. The MP3 announced the title of the album to be Go and gave a worldwide release date of "the week of 5 April 2010" through Parlophone and XL Recordings.

On 5 April 2010, as promised, the album was released in Iceland and the United Kingdom, with a worldwide release date of the following day. The album was sung mainly in English, marking a change from the majority of Jónsi's previous work, which was sung mainly in Icelandic and Vonlenska. The album charted at No. 20 on the UK album charts on 12 April 2010 and reached No. 23 on the Billboard 200.

The Go limited-edition box set also included Go Quiet, a 45-minute film, directed by Dean DeBlois (director of the Sigur Rós concert film Heima), that features all nine songs from the album performed acoustically at home in Reykjavík, over New Year 2010.

Jónsi went on tour with his album Go on 6 April 2010. The tour did not include any venues within Jónsi's home country of Iceland. The artist's touring band included Alex Somers on guitar, sound effects, and keyboards; Thorvaldur Thór Thorvaldsson on drums; Ólafur Björn Ólafsson on keyboards; and Úlfur Hansson on bass and monome.

=== Shiver (2020) ===
Jónsi went a decade without releasing any solo material. On 3 April 2020, Jónsi took to Instagram to announce that he was releasing music later that month, which would be the lead single, "Exhale", to his second studio album, Shiver, with an accompanying music video directed by Jónsi and Giovanni Ribisi.

The album was made in collaboration with English music producer, singer and head of record label PC Music, A. G. Cook. Jónsi had no expectation for his and Cook's initial meeting, but the more they talked, the more he realized they might be perfect collaborators.

Jónsi released another single, "Swill", for the album on 24 June 2020, with an accompanying music video directed by Barnaby Roper.

== Collaborations ==
Jónsi makes a guest appearance under the alias 'Frakkur' on track 13, "Skyscraper Heart", on Hi-Camp Meets Lo-Fi – Explosion Picture Score by Dip (1999)
Jónsi provides vocal material on three collaborations with The Hafler Trio:
Exactly As I Say (2004 CD; a separate limited edition of 111 copies also exists containing DVD and 5.1 surround sound)
Exactly As I Am (2005 Double CD)
Exactly As I Do (2005 Double CD)
Jónsi makes a guest appearance on Tiësto's track "Kaleidoscope" on his album of the same name, which was released on 6 October 2009.
Jónsi appears on the album In a Safe Place by The Album Leaf, on the song "Over the Pond".

In 2018, Jónsi collaborated with Troye Sivan on the song "Revelation" from the Boy Erased soundtrack.

== Languages ==
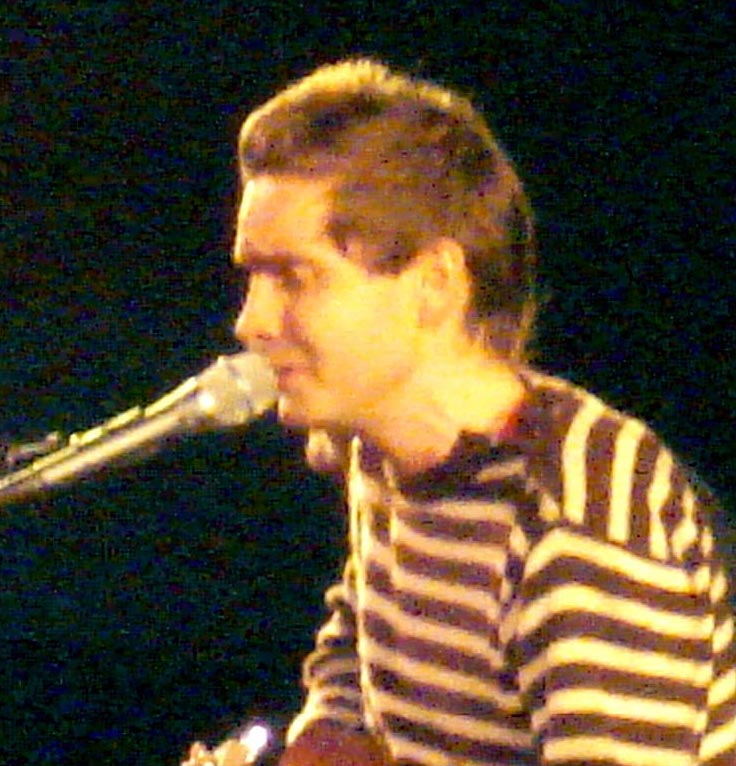
Jónsi at UCLA, playing to promote Heima

Jónsi's first language is Icelandic. He also speaks English, according to the official Sigur Rós website:

On the first three Sigur Rós albums (Von, Von Brigði, Ágætis Byrjun), Jónsi sang most songs in Icelandic but two of them ("Von" and "Olsen Olsen") were sung in 'Hopelandic'. All of the vocals on ( ) are in Hopelandic. Hopelandic (Vonlenska in Icelandic) is the 'invented language' in which Jónsi sings before lyrics are written to the vocals. It is not an actual language by definition (no vocabulary, grammar, etc.), but rather a form of gibberish vocals that fit to the music and act as another instrument. Jónsi likens it to what singers sometimes do when they've decided on the melody, but haven't written the lyrics yet. Many languages were considered to be used on ( ), including English, but they decided on Hopelandic. Hopelandic (Vonlenska) got its name (from a journalist, not Jónsi himself) from the first song which Jónsi sang on, "Hope" (Von).

== Instruments ==
Like a few other players of the bowed guitar, Jónsi plays mainly variations of the Les Paul. He also plays Ibanez Les Paul copies, model PF200. The first Ibanez used to be his main instrument during the Bee Spiders era all through Ágætis Byrjun. It was largely refinished and decorated (as can be seen in Ágúst Jakobsson's documentary Popp í Reykjavík). That particular instrument got stolen and broken but was on display in the Reykjavík Art Museum in the summer of 2003. During the recordings of Takk..., Jónsi bought another PF200 to replace the Les Paul. Since the summer of 2006, Jónsi has been using a guitar that was made on the road by his then guitar tech Dan Johnson. The guitar is usually referred to as "The Bird", after the band's bird designs seen on previous album artwork that adorn the neck and frets of the guitar. "The Bird" is based on the body of the Ibanez PF200. The artist has also been seen playing a variety of other instruments such as the piano, acoustic guitar, electric bass guitar, harmonium, mellotron, baritone ukulele, and the banjo.

== Activism ==
In 2003, he was escorted off the premises while protesting against Kárahnjúkar Hydropower Plant in Iceland.

Jónsi is a vegetarian. He states that he "didn't go vegetarian because of the animals" but became gradually more concerned for their welfare. Jónsi elaborated that he would find it difficult to date someone who eats meat, saying "I just love animals and I do not want to kill them, cook them or eat them so it'd be hard for me to watch anyone do that." He briefly followed a raw food diet, although he no longer practices this as he felt it hindered his social life and he was "getting antisocial" when on tour.

== Visual arts ==
Alongside his visual art collaboration with Alex Somers, he has also exhibited his own artwork. Jónsi has exhibited at the Los Angeles branch of Tanya Bonakdar Gallery in late 2019 and again in 2023, as well as their New York branch in 2021. He has shared that artist Olafur Eliasson is an influence on his art practice.

He also exhibited a large-scale experiential artwork titled FLÓÐ at the National Nordic Museum in early 2023. Jónsi: Hrafntinna (Obsidian) was exhibited at the Art Gallery of Ontario (AGO), Toronto in 2022 as well as the Museum of Old and New Art, Tasmania, Australia in 2023.

Jónsi founded Fischersund, a perfumery and art collective with his sisters Inga, Lilja and Sigurros in 2017, and together they launched their debut exhibition Faux Flora, a multi-sensory experience at the National Nordic Museum in 2024 through to 2025.

== Personal life ==
Jónsi is openly gay. He began a relationship with fellow musician Alex Somers in 2003 and released an art collaboration with him. They announced their separation in 2019, after having been together for 16 years, and remain close friends.

He is blind in his right eye from birth as a result of a broken optic nerve from the brain.

== Discography ==
=== Albums ===
==== Studio albums ====
Title	Album details	Peak chart positions									
Title	Album details	AUS	BEL	FRA	GER	ITA	NLD	SWE	SWI	UK	US
Go	Released: 5 April 2010; Label: XL Recordings, Parlophone; Formats: CD	64	6	86	100	74	84	35	31	20	23
Shiver	Released: 2 October 2020; Label: Krunk; Formats: Vinyl, CD, digital download	—	—	—	—	—	—	—	88	—	—
Obsidian	Released: 30 October 2021; Label: Krunk; Formats: Digital download, Vinyl (Reissue)	—	—	—	—	—	—	—	—	—	—
First Light	Released: 30 August 2024; Label: Myndstream, Lakeshore Records; Formats: Digital download	—	—	—	—	—	—	—	—	—	—

==== Collaborative albums ====
===== Jónsi and Alex (with Alex Somers) =====
Title	Album details
Riceboy Sleeps	Released: 20 July 2009; Label: XL Recordings, Krunk; Formats: CD, digital download, vinyl
Lost & Found	Released: 11 October 2019; Label: Krunk; Formats: Digital download

===== Dark Morph (with Carl Michael von Hausswolff) =====
Title	Album details
Dark Morph	Released: 10 May 2019; Label: Krunk; Formats: CD, digital download
Dark Morph II	Released: 1 May 2020; Label: Pomperipossa Records; Formats: Digital download, vinyl

===== Other collaborative albums =====
Title	Album details
Sounds of Fischer Vol. 1 (with Sin Fang, Alex Somers and Kjartan Holm)	Released: 16 September 2022; Label: INNI; Formats: digital download

==== Soundtrack albums ====
Title	Album details
We Bought a Zoo	Released: 9 December 2011; Label: Twentieth Century Fox Film Corporation; Formats: Digital download
Manhattan (with Alex Somers, Jeff Russo and Zoë Keating)	Released: 5 February 2016; Label: Lakeshore Records; Formats: Digital download
Tom Clancy's Without Remorse	Released: 29 April 2021; Label: Paramount Music; Formats: Digital download
EA Sports PGA Tour	Released: 7 April 2023; Label: EA Sports; Formats: Digital

==== Live albums ====
Title	Album details
Go Live	Released: 14 December 2010; Label: Parlophone, Krunk; Formats: CD, digital download

==== Compilation albums ====
Title	Album details
2000 - 2004 (as Frakkur)	Released: 23 November 2018; Label: Krunk; Formats: CD, vinyl, digital download

==== Film albums ====
Title	Album details
Go Quiet	Released: 2010; Formats: DVD

=== Extended plays ===
Title	Details
All Animals (as Jónsi & Alex with Alex Somers)	Released: 20 July 2009; Label: Krunk; Formats: Digital, CD, Vinyl
Go Do	Released: 22 March 2010; Label: Parlophone, EMI, Krunk; Formats: Digital, CD, Vinyl
Go Out	Remixes EP; Released: 16 April 2011; Label: EMI, Krunk; Formats: Digital, Vinyl
11.16/12.21.2019	Released: November 2021; Label: Krunk; Formats: Vinyl

=== Singles ===
==== As lead artist ====
Title	Year	Album
"Go Do"	2010	Go
"Animal Arithmetic"	2010	Go
"Revelation" (with Troye Sivan)	2018	Boy Erased
"TB2" (as Frakkur)	2018	2000 - 2004
"Together From Afar"	2019	How to Train Your Dragon: The Hidden World
"Dark Wave" (as Dark Morph with Carl Michael von Hausswolff)	2020	Dark Morph II
"Exhale"	2020	Shiver
"Swill"	2020	Shiver
"Evol Lamina" (with Gyða Valtýsdóttir)	2020	Epicycle II
"Cannibal" (featuring Elizabeth Fraser)	2020	Shiver
"Cul de sac" (with Trayer Tryon and Alex Somers featuring Moses Sumney, Julianna Barwick and Nicole Miglis)	2020	New Forever
"Salt Licorice" (featuring Robyn)	2020	Shiver
"Mold"	2021	Shiver
"Beitilyng" (with Sin Fang, Alex Somers and Kjartan Holm)	2022	Sounds of Fischer Vol. 1
"Birki" (with Sin Fang, Alex Somers and Kjartan Holm)	2022	Sounds of Fischer Vol. 1
"Bakgarðar" (with Kjartan Holm and Sin Fang)	2022	Non-album single

==== As featured artist ====
Title	Year	Album
"Kaleidoscope" (Tiësto featuring Jónsi)	2009	Kaleidoscope
"Candyland" (Sin Fang featuring Jónsi)	2016	Spaceland
"In Light" (Julianna Barwick featuring Jónsi)	2020	Healing Is a Miracle
"Carry On" (Mykki Blanco featuring Jónsi)	2022	Stay Close To Music
"LOOK AT YOU" (Skrillex featuring Jónsi)	2025	Fuck U Skrillex You Think Ur Andy Warhol but Ur Not!! <3

=== Other appearances ===
Song	Artist	Year	Album
"Skyscraper Heart" (credited as 'Frakkur')	Dip	1999	Hi-Camp Meets Lo-Fi: Explosion Picture Score
"Over the Pond" (uncredited vocals)	The Album Leaf	2004	In a Safe Place
"Ammælisstrákur" (credited as 'Frakkur')	Various	2006	Kitchen Motors Family Album
"Kaleidoscope"	Tiësto	2009	Kaleidoscope
"Sticks & Stones"	Various	2010	How to Train Your Dragon: Music from the Motion Picture
"Where No One Goes"	Various	2014	How to Train Your Dragon 2
"For the Dancing and Dreaming" (melody-writer)	Various	2014	How to Train Your Dragon 2
"Simple Gifts"	Danny Elfman	2017	The Circle (Original Motion Picture Soundtrack)
"Revelation" (with Troye Sivan)	Daniel Bensi	2018	Boy Erased (Original Motion Picture Soundtrack)
"Who Are You Thinking Of?"	Daniel Bensi	2018	Boy Erased (Original Motion Picture Soundtrack)
"The Hidden World" "Together from Afar"	Various	2019	How to Train Your Dragon: The Hidden World
"One Life" (Mark Ronson featuring Diana Gordon and Jónsi)	Mark Ronson	2021	Watch the Sound (Original Soundtrack)
"Oil + Honey" (co-production and additional vocals)	Hyd	2022	Clearing
