= PinkPantheress discography =

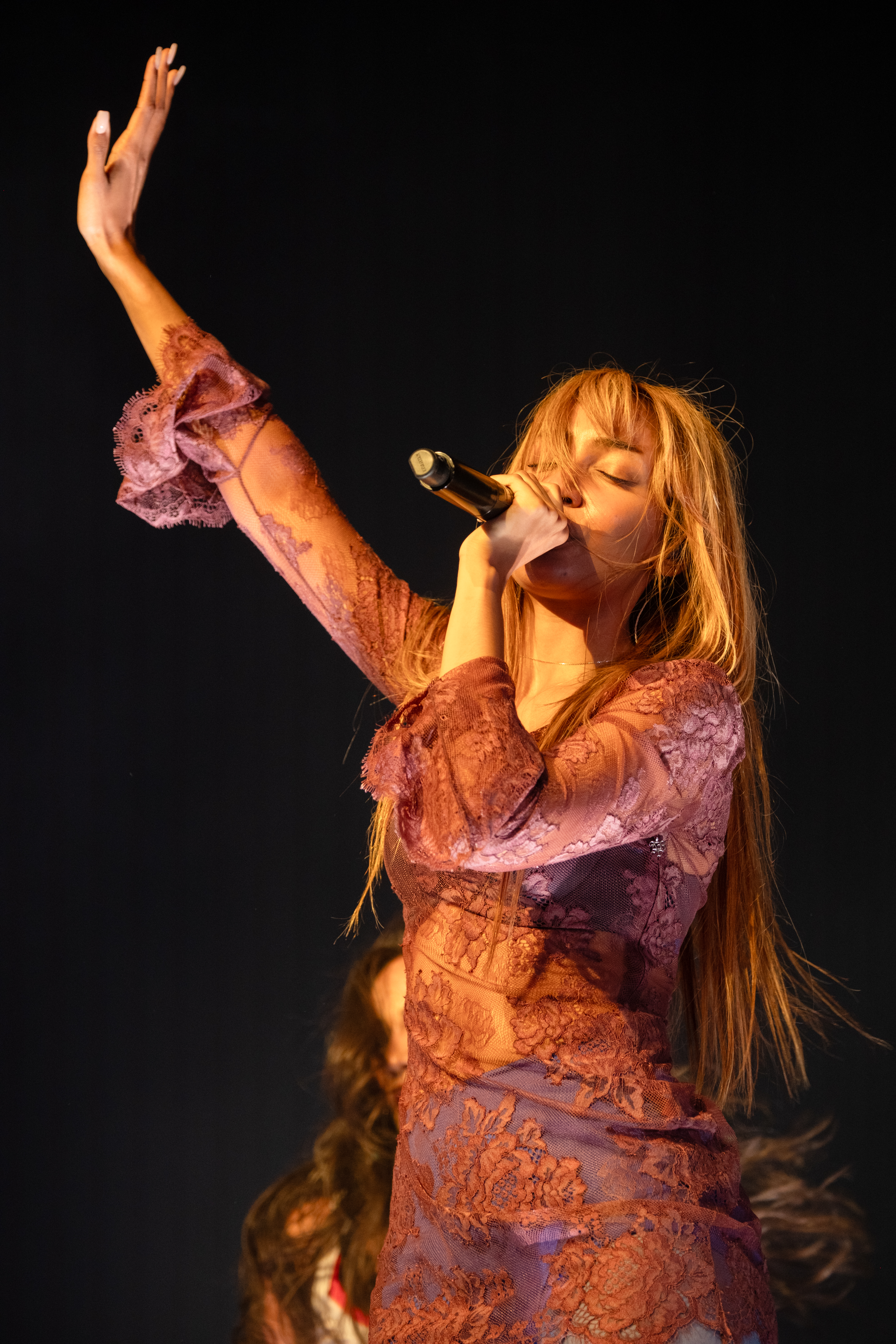
- PinkPantheress performing at the 2026 Montreux Jazz Festival
- Studio albums: 1
- EPs: 1
- Singles: 25
- Music videos: 15
- Mixtapes: 2
- Remix albums: 3

The discography of British singer-songwriter and record producer PinkPantheress consists of one studio album, two mixtapes, one extended play, and 25 singles (including two as a featured artist).

== Albums ==
=== Studio albums ===
List of studio albums, with release date, label, selected chart positions, and certifications shown
Title	Details	Peak chart positions										Certifications
Title	Details	UK	AUS	BEL (FL)	CAN	FRA	IRE	NZ	SCO	SWI	US	Certifications
Heaven Knows	Released: 10 November 2023; Label: Parlophone, Warner UK; Formats: LP, CD, cassette, digital download, streaming	28	98	102	59	166	16	30	22	84	61	MC: Gold

=== Remix albums ===
List of remix albums, with release date and label shown
Title	Details	Peak chart positions				Certifications
Title	Details	AUS	CAN	NZ	US	Certifications
To Hell with It (Remixes)	Released: 28 January 2022; Label: Parlophone, Elektra; Formats: USB flash drive, cassette, digital download, streaming	—	—	—	—	
Heaven Knows (Remixes)	Released: 7 December 2023; Label: Self-released; Formats: Digital download	—	—	—	—	
Fancy Some More?	Released: 10 October 2025; Label: Warner UK; Formats: Digital download, streaming	72	19	26	30	RMNZ: Gold

== Mixtapes ==
List of mixtapes, with release date, label, selected chart positions, and certifications shown
Title	Details	Peak chart positions										Certifications
Title	Details	UK	AUS	BEL (FL)	IRE	LTU	NLD	NZ	POR	SCO	US	Certifications
To Hell with It	Released: 15 October 2021; Label: Parlophone, Elektra; Format: LP, CD, digital download, streaming	20	78	188	36	20	—	27	6	100	73	BPI: Gold; RMNZ: Platinum
Fancy That	Released: 9 May 2025; Label: Parlophone, Warner UK; Formats: LP, CD, digital download, streaming, cassette	3	6	75	31	53	14	12	82	3	56	BPI: Gold
"—" denotes songs which were not released in that country or did not chart.

== Extended plays ==
List of extended plays, with release date and label shown
Title	Details
Take Me Home	Released: 16 December 2022; Label: Parlophone, Elektra; Format: Digital download, streaming

== Singles ==
=== As lead artist ===
List of singles, with year released, selected chart positions, certifications, and album name shown
Title	Year	Peak chart positions										Certifications	Album
Title	Year	UK	AUS	CAN	IRE	NLD	NZ	SWE	SWI	US	WW	Certifications	Album
"Out Here"	2019	—	—	—	—	—	—	—	—	—	—		Non-album single
"Break It Off"	2021	74	—	—	—	—	—	—	—	—	—	BPI: Gold; MC: Gold; RMNZ: Platinum	To Hell with It
"Pain"	2021	35	—	—	54	—	— (Note: "Pain" did not enter the NZ Top 40 Singles Chart, but it peaked at number three on the NZ Hot Singles Chart.)	—	—	—	—	BPI: Platinum; RMNZ: 2× Platinum	To Hell with It
"Passion"	2021	73	—	—	—	—	—	—	—	—	—	BPI: Silver; RMNZ: Gold	To Hell with It
"Just for Me"	2021	27	—	—	49	—	— (Note: "Just for Me" did not enter the NZ Top 40 Singles Chart, but it peaked at number five on the NZ Hot Singles Chart.)	—	—	—	—	BPI: Silver; RMNZ: Gold	To Hell with It
"I Must Apologise"	2021	85	—	—	—	—	— (Note: "I Must Apologise" did not enter the NZ Top 40 Singles Chart, but it peaked at number 34 on the NZ Hot Singles Chart.)	—	—	—	—	BPI: Silver; RMNZ: Gold	To Hell with It
"Bbycakes" (with Mura Masa and Lil Uzi Vert featuring Shygirl)	2022	71	—	—	—	—	— (Note: "Bbycakes" did not enter the NZ Top 40 Singles Chart, but it peaked at number 24 on the NZ Hot Singles Chart.)	—	—	—	—		Demon Time
"Where You Are" (featuring Willow)	2022	58	—	—	69	—	— (Note: "Where You Are" did not enter the NZ Top 40 Singles Chart, but it peaked at number eight on the NZ Hot Singles Chart.)	—	—	—	—		Non-album singles
"Picture in My Mind" (with Sam Gellaitry)	2022	—	—	—	—	—	— (Note: "Picture in My Mind" did not enter the NZ Top 40 Singles Chart, but it peaked at number 14 on the NZ Hot Singles Chart.)	—	—	—	—		Non-album singles
"Do You Miss Me?"	2022	—	—	—	—	—	—	—	—	—	—		Take Me Home
"Boy's a Liar" (solo or remix with Ice Spice)	2022	2	2	2	2	18	1	15	18	3	3	BPI: 2× Platinum; ARIA: 3× Platinum; MC: 5× Platinum; RIAA: Platinum; RMNZ: 4× Platinum	Take Me Home and Heaven Knows
"Way Back" (with Skrillex and Trippie Redd)	2023	—	—	—	—	—	—	—	—	—	—		Don't Get Too Close
"Turn Your Phone Off" (featuring Destroy Lonely)	2023	—	—	—	—	—	— (Note: "Turn Your Phone Off" did not enter the NZ Top 40 Singles Chart, but it peaked at number 14 on the NZ Hot Singles Chart.)	—	—	—	—		Non-album single
"Mosquito"	2023	74	—	—	98	—	— (Note: "Mosquito" did not enter the NZ Top 40 Singles Chart, but it peaked at number six on the NZ Hot Singles Chart.)	—	—	—	—		Heaven Knows
"Capable of Love"	2023	—	—	—	—	—	— (Note: "Capable of Love" did not enter the NZ Top 40 Singles Chart, but it peaked at number 36 on the NZ Hot Singles Chart.)	—	—	—	—		Heaven Knows
"Nice to Meet You" (featuring Central Cee)	2023	20	—	—	—	—	— (Note: "Nice to Meet You" did not enter the NZ Top 40 Singles Chart, but it peaked at number five on the NZ Hot Singles Chart.)	—	—	—	—		Heaven Knows
"Turn It Up"	2024	94	—	—	—	—	— (Note: "Turn It Up" did not enter the NZ Top 40 Singles Chart, but it peaked at number eight on the NZ Hot Singles Chart.)	—	—	—	—		Non-album single
"Tonight"	2025	35	—	—	88	—	— (Note: "Tonight" did not enter the NZ Top 40 Singles Chart, but peaked at number 7 on the NZ Hot Singles Chart.)	—	—	— (Note: "Tonight" did not enter the Billboard Hot 100 chart, but it peaked at number 25 on the Bubbling Under Hot 100 chart.)	—	BPI: Silver	Fancy That
"Stateside" (solo or remix with Zara Larsson)	2025	3	3	6	3	11	5	3	11	6	1	BPI: Platinum; ARIA: 2× Platinum; MC: 3× Platinum; RMNZ: 2× Platinum	Fancy That and Fancy Some More?
"Illegal"	2025	22	42	73	37	—	32	—	—	96	109	BPI: Gold; ARIA: Gold; RMNZ: Gold	Fancy That
"Close to You"	2025	—	—	—	—	—	— (Note: "Close to You" did not enter the NZ Top 40 Singles Chart, but peaked at number 31 on the NZ Hot Singles Chart.)	—	—	—	—		TBA
"Starlight" (with Danny L Harle)	2025	—	—	—	—	—	—	—	—	—	—		Cerulean
"Girl Like Me"	2026	61	—	—	95	—	—	—	—	—	—	BPI: Silver	Fancy That
"Sexy Magic" (with Ca7riel & Paco Amoroso, Fred Again, and Étienne de Crécy)	2026	87	—	—	—	—	— (Note: "Sexy Magic" did not enter the NZ Top 40 Singles Chart, but peaked at number 9 on the NZ Hot Singles Chart.)	—	—	—	—		Grand Theft Auto VI: The Album
"Midnight Sun" (with Zara Larsson)	2026	—	—	—	—	—	— (Note: "Midnight Sun - Girls Trip" did not enter the NZ Top 40 Singles Chart, but peaked at number 8 on the NZ Hot Singles Chart.)	62	—	—	—		Midnight Sun: Girls Trip
"—" denotes songs which were not released in that country or did not chart.

=== As featured artist ===
List of singles as a featured artist, with year released and album name shown
Title	Year	Album
"True Religion" (Shygirl featuring Isabella Lovestory and PinkPantheress)	2025	Club Shy Room 2
"Soap" (Yves featuring PinkPantheress)	2025	Soft Error

=== Promotional singles ===
List of promotional singles, with year released, selected chart positions, and album name shown
Title	Year	Peak chart positions		Certifications	Album
Title	Year	IRE	NZ Hot	Certifications	Album
"Just a Waste"	2021	—	—		Non-album singles
"Attracted to You"	2021	—	—	BPI: Silver; RMNZ: Gold	Non-album singles
"Angel"	2023	76	19		Barbie the Album
"Rush" (Troye Sivan featuring PinkPantheress and Hyunjin)	2023	—	12		Non-album single
"Illegal" (remix) (with Nia Archives)	2025	—	36		Fancy Some More?
"—" denotes songs which were not released in that country or did not chart.

== Other charted songs ==
List of other charted songs, with year released, selected chart positions, and album name shown
Title	Year	Peak chart positions				Album
Title	Year	NZ Hot	US Rock	US Afro.	US Dance/ Elec.	Album
"Reason"	2021	—	39	—	—	To Hell with It
"Anya Mmiri" (CKay featuring PinkPantheress)	2022	—	—	28	—	Black Panther: Wakanda Forever – Music from and Inspired By
"Take Me Home"	2022	29	—	—	—	Take Me Home
"Snap My Finger" (Kaytranada featuring PinkPantheress)	2024	—	—	—	40	Timeless
"Stars"	2025	22	—	—	—	Fancy That
"Noises"	2025	25	—	—	—	Fancy That
"—" denotes songs which were not released in that country or did not chart.

== Guest appearances ==
List of guest appearances, with year released, other artist(s), and album name shown
Title	Year	Other artist(s)	Album	Notes
"Evian"	2021	GoldLink, Rizloski, Rax	Haram!	
"Obsessed with You"	2021	Central Cee	23	Producer, uncredited vocals
"Cake"	2022	Remi Wolf	Juno (Deluxe)	Uncredited
"Tinkerbell Is Overrated"	2022	Beabadoobee	Beatopia	
"Killstreaks"	2022	Baby Keem, Don Toliver	The Melodic Blue	
"Pink XOXO"	2024	Camila Cabello	C,XOXO	Uncredited
"Crazy"	2024	Le Sserafim	Non-album single	Remix
"Kiss Me Thru The Phone pt 2"	2025	Amaarae	Black Star	
"Princess"	2025	Benee	Ur an Angel I'm Just Particles	Writer, uncredited vocals
"Wild and Alone"	2025	FKA Twigs	Eusexua Afterglow	
"The Bridge"	2026	Kelela	New Avatar	
"Crush"	2026	Jae Stephens	Audacity	Background vocals
"Twentyfive Eight (flip)"	2026	Tinashe	Popstar	Remix

== Music videos ==
List of music videos, showing year released and director
Title	Year	Director(s)
"Just for Me"	2021	Lauzza and PinkPantheress
"Where You Are"	2022	Brthr
"Picture in My Mind"	2022	Aidan Zamiri
"Do You Miss Me?"	2022	Lengurz
"Do You Miss Me? (Alternate version)"	2022	Zite & Leo
"Boy's a Liar Pt. 2"	2023	George Buford and Frederick Buford
"Mosquito"	2023	Sophie Muller
"Capable of Love"	2023	Aidan Zamiri
"Nice to Meet You" (featuring Central Cee)	2023	Charlotte Rutherford
"Reason"	2024	Lauzza
"Tonight"	2025	Charlotte Rutherford
"Stateside (American Version)"	2025	Emma Berson
"Illegal"	2025	Ethan & Tom
"Close to You"	2025	Lauzza
"Romeo"	2025	Iris Luz
"Noises + JT"	2025	Charlotte Rutherford
"Stateside + Zara Larsson"	2026	Charlotte Rutherford
"Girl Like Me"	2026	Laurie Lotus
