= An Evening With... PinkPantheress =

2025–2026 concert tour by PinkPantheress

- Tour by PinkPantheress
- Promotional poster for the first North American leg of the tour
- Location: Europe; Japan; North America; Oceania
- Associated album: Fancy That
- Start date: 18 September 2025
- End date: 2 June 2026
- Legs: 4
- No. of shows: 41

PinkPantheress concert chronology
- Capable of Love Tour (2024); An Evening With... Pink Pantheress (2025–2026)

An Evening With... PinkPantheress was the third concert tour by the British singer-songwriter PinkPantheress in support of her 2025 mixtape Fancy That. It began on 18 September 2025 in London, England, and concluded on 2 June 2026 in Berlin, Germany.

== Background ==
The United Kingdom leg was announced on 7 April 2025, alongside the announcement of her mixtape, Fancy That. The North American leg was announced on 17 June of the same year.

On 9 December 2025, PinkPantheress announced an expansion of the tour for 2026, adding new dates across North America, and on 27 February 2026, a further expansion was announced with new dates in the UK and Europe.

== Critical reception ==
Reception for the show was positive. Kyann-Sian Williams of NME said, "It may not have reinvented the live experience, but it proved PinkPantheress' real gift: she knows how to turn a massive venue into something intimate, funny and unhinged."

== Set list ==
The set list below is adapted from the 24 October 2025 show in New York City. It does not represent all shows.

1. "Stateside"
2. "Noises"
3. "Close to You"
4. "Nice to Know You"
5. "I Must Apologise"
6. "Break It Off"
7. "Last Valentines"
8. "Just for Me"
9. "Take Me Home"
10. "Pain"
11. "The Aisle"
12. "Nice to Meet You"
13. "Capable of Love"
14. "Another Life"
15. "Feel Complete"
16. "True Romance"
17. "Stateside + Zara Larsson"
18. "Girl Like Me"
19. "Tonight"
20. "Stars"
21. "Mosquito"
22. "Angel"
23. "Romeo"
24. "Boy's a Liar Pt. 2"
25. "Passion"
26. "Picture in My Mind"
27. "Illegal"

Encore

28. "Attracted to You"

=== Guest appearances ===
- 24 October 2025 - New York City: Zohran Mamdani
- 2 November 2025 - Chicago: Adamn Killa
- 18 April 2026 - Indio: Zara Larsson, Janelle Monáe, Ninajirachi, Tyriq Withers, Chase Infiniti, Slayyyter, Manon
- 7 May 2026 - New York City: Cece Natalie, Rochelle Jordan, Underscores, The Dare, Kelela
- 29 May 2026 - London: Rachel Chinouriri, Jade

== Tour dates ==
List of 2025 concerts
Date (2025)	City	Country	Venue
18 September	London	England	O_{2} Academy Brixton
19 September	London	England	O_{2} Academy Brixton
24 October	New York City	United States	Kings Theatre
25 October	New York City	United States	Kings Theatre
27 October	Toronto	Canada	Massey Hall
29 October	Toronto	Canada	Massey Hall
30 October	Toronto	Canada	Massey Hall
1 November	Chicago	United States	Byline Bank Aragon Ballroom
2 November	Chicago	United States	Byline Bank Aragon Ballroom
5 November	Los Angeles	United States	The Wiltern
6 November	Los Angeles	United States	The Wiltern
9 November	Los Angeles	United States	The Wiltern
10 November	Los Angeles	United States	The Wiltern
12 November	San Francisco	United States	The Masonic
13 November	Oakland	United States	Fox Theatre

List of 2026 concerts
Date (2026)	City	Country	Venue
5 February (Note: The 5 February 2026 concert in Auckland was a part of the Laneway Festival.)	Auckland	New Zealand	Western Springs Stadium
7 February (Note: The 7 February 2026 concert in Gold Coast was a part of the Laneway Festival.)	Gold Coast	Australia	Southport Sharks
8 February (Note: The 8 February 2026 concert in Sydney was a part of the Laneway Festival.)	Sydney	Australia	Centennial Park
13 February (Note: The 13 February 2026 concert in Melbourne was a part of the Laneway Festival.)	Melbourne	Australia	Flemington Park
14 February (Note: The 14 February 2026 concert in Adelaide was a part of the Laneway Festival.)	Adelaide	Australia	Adelaide Showground
15 February (Note: The 15 February 2026 concert in Perth was a part of the Laneway Festival.)	Perth	Australia	Arena Joondalup
19 February	Tokyo	Japan	Toyosu PIT
8 April	Mexico City	Mexico	Pabellón Oeste
11 April (Note: The concerts on 11 and 18 April 2026 in Indio were a part of the Coachella Valley Music and Arts Festival.)	Indio	United States	Empire Polo Club
14 April	Seattle	United States	WaMu Theater
16 April	Vancouver	Canada	PNE Forum
18 April	Indio	United States	Empire Polo Club
20 April	Phoenix	United States	Arizona Financial Theatre
22 April	Houston	United States	713 Music Hall
23 April	Dallas	United States	South Side Ballroom
26 April	Miami Beach	United States	The Fillmore Miami Beach
27 April	Orlando	United States	Hard Rock Live
30 April	Atlanta	United States	Coca-Cola Roxy
1 May	Atlanta	United States	Coca-Cola Roxy
3 May	Washington, D.C.	United States	The Anthem
4 May	Washington, D.C.	United States	The Anthem
7 May	New York City	United States	Brooklyn Storehouse
9 May	Philadelphia	United States	The Met
10 May	Philadelphia	United States	The Met
12 May	Boston	United States	MGM Music Hall at Fenway
14 May (Note: The show on 14 May 2026 in Montreal was originally scheduled to take place the day after, but it was rescheduled due to the venue being relocated from the M Telus.)	Montreal	Canada	L'Olympia
23 May	Glasgow	Scotland	SEC Centre
25 May	Manchester	England	O_{2} Victoria Warehouse
26 May	Manchester	England	O_{2} Victoria Warehouse
29 May	London	England	Alexandra Palace
31 May	Paris	France	Zénith
1 June	Amsterdam	Netherlands	AFAS Live
2 June	Berlin	Germany	Tempodrom
