= List of awards and nominations received by PinkPantheress =

PinkPantheress awards and nominations
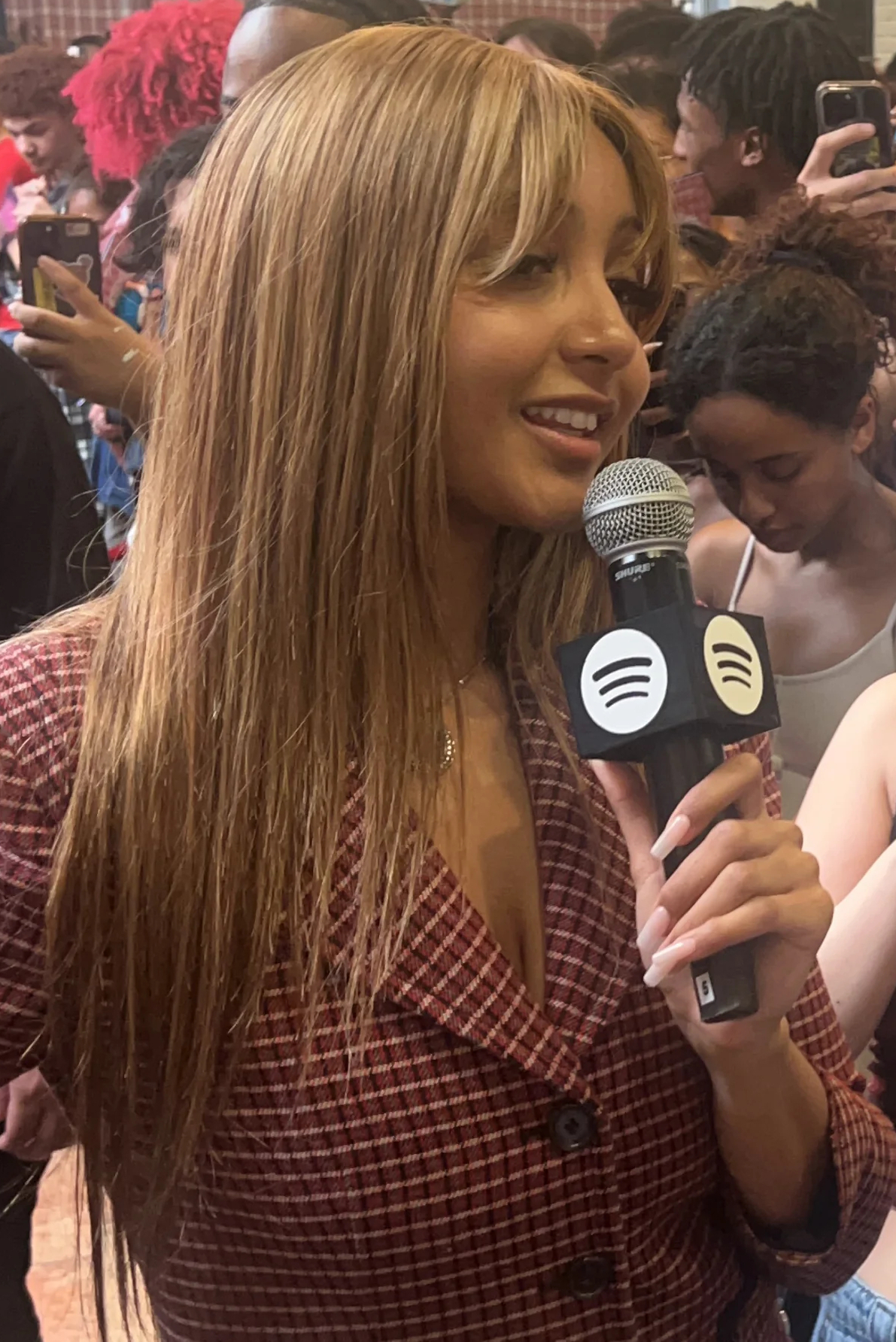
- PinkPantheress attending the Spotify Awards in 2025
Awards and nominations
Award	Wins	Nominations
American Music Awards	1	3
Billboard	1	1
Brit	1	6
Grammy	0	2
Ivor Novello	0	2
Mercury Prize	0	1
MTV Europe	0	3
MTV VMA	1	6
NME	0	3
MTV Movie & TV Awards	0	1

Totals (Note: Certain award groups do not simply award one winner. They acknowledge several different recipients, have runners-up, and have third place. Since this is a specific recognition and is different from losing an award, runner-up mentions are considered wins in this award tally. For simplification and to avoid errors, each award in this list has been presumed to have had a prior nomination.)
- Wins: 6
- Nominations: 45

PinkPantheress is a British singer-songwriter and record producer. She has released two mixtapes, To Hell with It (2021) and Fancy That (2025), and one album, Heaven Knows (2023).

PinkPantheress has received 6 awards from 45 nominations. She won BBC's Sound of 2022 poll and was named Producer of the Year by Billboard Women in Music in 2024. She won the Brit Award for British Producer of the Year in 2026, becoming the youngest person and first woman in history to be awarded the honour. She has also been nominated for three American Music Awards and two Grammy Awards.

== Awards and nominations ==
List of awards and nominations received by PinkPantheress
Award	Year (Note: Indicates the year of ceremony. Each year is linked to the article about the awards held that year, wherever possible.)	Category	Recipient(s) and nominee(s)	Result	Ref.
American Music Awards	2026	Collaboration of the Year	"Stateside + Zara Larsson"	Won	
American Music Awards	2026	Song of the Summer	"Stateside + Zara Larsson"	Nominated	
American Music Awards	2026	Social Song of the Year	"Illegal"	Nominated	
BBC Sound of...	2022	BBC Sound of 2022	Herself	Won	
BET Awards	2023	Best Collaboration	"Boy's a Liar Pt. 2" (with Ice Spice)	Nominated	
BET Awards	2023	BET Her Award	"Boy's a Liar Pt. 2" (with Ice Spice)	Nominated	
Billboard Women in Music	2024	Producer of the Year	Herself	Won	
Brit Awards	2022	Song of the Year	"Obsessed With You"	Nominated	
Brit Awards	2024	Song of the Year	"Boy's a Liar"	Nominated	
Brit Awards	2024	Best New Artist	Herself	Nominated	
Brit Awards	2026	British Artist of the Year	Herself	Nominated	
Brit Awards	2026	British Dance Act	Herself	Nominated	
Brit Awards	2026	British Producer of the Year	Herself	Won	
Grammy Awards	2026	Best Dance Pop Recording	"Illegal"	Nominated	
Grammy Awards	2026	Best Dance/Electronic Album	Fancy That	Nominated	
Ivor Novello Awards	2022	Rising Star Award	Herself	Nominated	
Ivor Novello Awards	2022	Best Contemporary Song	"Just for Me"	Nominated	
iHeartRadio Music Awards	2022	TikTok Bop of the Year	"Just for Me"	Nominated	
iHeartRadio Music Awards	2024	TikTok Bop of the Year	"Boy's a Liar Pt. 2" (with Ice Spice)	Nominated	
iHeartRadio Music Awards	2024	Best Collaboration	"Boy's a Liar Pt. 2" (with Ice Spice)	Nominated	
iHeartRadio Music Awards	2026	Favorite K-Pop Collaboration	"Illegal" (with Seventeen)	Nominated	
Mercury Prize	2025	Best Album	Fancy That	Nominated	
MOBO Awards	2022	Best Female Act	Herself	Won	
MOBO Awards	2023	Best Female Act	Herself	Nominated	
MOBO Awards	2023	Best Electronic/Dance Act	Herself	Nominated	
MOBO Awards	2023	Song of the Year	"Boy's a Liar Pt. 2" (with Ice Spice)	Nominated	
MOBO Awards	2025	Best Electronic/Dance Music Act	Herself	Nominated	
MOBO Awards	2026	Best Female Act	Herself	Nominated	
MOBO Awards	2026	Best Electronic Act	Herself	Nominated	
MOBO Awards	2026	Song of the Year	"Illegal"	Nominated	
MTV Europe Music Awards	2023	Best Collaboration	"Boy's a Liar Pt. 2" (with Ice Spice)	Nominated	
MTV Europe Music Awards	2023	Best New Act	Herself	Nominated	
MTV Europe Music Awards	2023	Best UK & Ireland Act	Herself	Nominated	
MTV Video Music Awards	2023	Best New Artist	Herself	Nominated	
MTV Video Music Awards	2026	Song of the Year	"Stateside" (with Zara Larsson)	Nominated	
MTV Video Music Awards	2026	Best Collaboration	"Stateside" (with Zara Larsson)	Nominated	
MTV Video Music Awards	2026	Best Dance	"Stateside" (with Zara Larsson)	Nominated	
MTV Video Music Awards	2026	Best Art Direction	"Stateside" (with Zara Larsson)	Won	
MTV Video Music Awards	2026	Best Visual Effects	"Stateside" (with Zara Larsson)	Nominated	
Music Awards Japan	2026	Best International Alternative Song in Japan	"Tonight"	Nominated	
Music Week Awards	2026	PR Campaign	Herself	Nominated	
Music Week Awards	2026	Promotions Campaign	Herself	Nominated	
NME Awards	2022	Best Song in the World	"Just for Me"	Nominated	
NME Awards	2022	Best Song by a UK Artist	"Just for Me"	Nominated	
NME Awards	2022	Best Mixtape	To Hell with It	Nominated	
Streamy Awards	2023	Sound of the Year	"Boy's a Liar Pt. 2" (with Ice Spice)	Nominated	
Soul Train Music Awards	2023	Video of the Year	"Boy's a Liar Pt. 2" (with Ice Spice)	Nominated	
UK Music Video Awards	2025	Best Pop Video – UK	"Tonight"	Nominated	

== Other accolades ==
=== Listicles ===
Name of publisher, year(s) listed, name of listicle, and placement result
Publisher	Year	Listicle	Result	Ref.
Forbes	2024	30 Under 30: Entertainment (Europe)	Placed	
