= Capable of Love Tour =

Concert tour

- Tour by PinkPantheress
- Promotional poster for the European leg of the tour
- Location: Europe; North America
- Associated album: Heaven Knows
- Start date: 20 February 2024
- End date: 1 May 2024
- Legs: 2
- No. of shows: 18

PinkPantheress tour chronology
- To Hell With It Tour (2022–2023); Capable of Love Tour (2024); An Evening With... PinkPantheress (2025–2026)

The Capable of Love Tour was the second concert tour by British singer PinkPantheress, in support of her debut studio album, Heaven Knows (2023). It began on 20 February 2024 in Dublin, Ireland, and concluded on 1 May 2024 in Los Angeles, California.

== Background ==
She announced the tour on October 12, 2023, alongside the announcement of the release of her debut album, Heaven Knows. The North American leg was announced on November 14, 2023. She set the pre-sale for October 17, with tickets being available to anyone who pre-ordered the album before October 16.

== Critical reception ==
Reception for the show was very positive. In a 4-star review of the London show for The Guardian, Shaad D'Souza said, "PinkPantheress's Capable of Love tour might be the least creative-directed pop spectacle mounted this year, and it's all the better for it." Ian Gomerly said for Exclaim!, "At the end of the short but thoroughly enjoyable set, it was clear that trying to solve the mystery of PinkPantheress is the wrong framing device. Clearly unconcerned with the glitzy accoutrements that come with modern pop stardom, PinkPantheress prefers that you just enjoy the music."

== Set list ==
This setlist was taken from the February 20 show in Dublin. It does not represent all shows throughout the tour.

1. Break It Off
2. I Must Apologise
3. Mosquito
4. Pain
5. Passion
6. Just for Me
7. Where You Are
8. Capable of Love
9. The Aisle
10. Take Me Home
11. Attracted to You
12. Bury Me
13. Feel Complete
14. Angel
15. Another Life
16. True Romance
17. Reason
18. Blue
19. Picture in My Mind
20. Boy's a Liar Pt. 2
21. Internet Baby (Interlude)
22. Nice to meet you

== Tour dates ==
Date	City	Country	Venue
Europe
February 20, 2024	Dublin	Ireland	3Olympia
February 22, 2024	Manchester	England	O2 Ritz
February 23, 2024	London	England	Alexandra Palace
February 27, 2024	Amsterdam	Netherlands	Paradiso
February 28, 2024	Paris	France	Élysée Montmartre
March 1, 2024	Berlin	Germany	Huxleys
North America
April 6, 2024	Detroit	United States	St. Andrew's Hall
April 7, 2024	Toronto	Canada	Danforth Music Hall
April 10, 2024	Montreal	Canada	Théâtre Beanfield
April 12, 2024	Boston	United States	Royale
April 14, 2024	New York	United States	Brooklyn Paramount
April 15, 2024	New York	United States	Brooklyn Paramount
April 17, 2024	Chicago	United States	Metro
April, 20, 2024	Nashville	United States	Brooklyn Bowl Nashville
April, 22, 2024	Dallas	United States	House of Blues
April 24, 2024	Houston	United States	White Oak Music Hall
April 25, 2024	Austin	United States	Emo's Austin
April 28, 2024	San Diego	United States	The Observatory North Park
April 30, 2024	Los Angeles	United States	Hollywood Palladium
May 1, 2024	Los Angeles	United States	Hollywood Palladium
