= Cece Natalie =

Musical artist (born 2005)

- Also known as: Priscilla 1234
- Born: Mia Ferrentino; April 4, 2005 (age 21); Connecticut, U.S.
- Genre: Pop
- Occupations: Singer; songwriter; record producer
- Instrument: Vocals
- Years active: 2022–present
- Label: Columbia
- Website: cecenatalie.co

Mia Ferrentino (born April 4, 2005), known professionally as Cece Natalie, is an American singer, songwriter, and record producer. Her debut studio album, Miss Behaves (2024), which featured 2000s–inspired pop songs, gained a cult following online following its release.

== Life and career ==
Mia Ferrentino was born in Connecticut on April 4, 2005 and raised as an only child by her mother in a studio apartment there; she later lived in her car. She has stated that she has attention deficit hyperactivity disorder (ADHD) and was diagnosed with sensory processing disorder (SPD) at age seven. She has stated that she felt "very outcasted" and "really isolated" during her upbringing.

Inspired by Swedish rapper Bladee and his hip hop collective Drain Gang, she started making hyperpop music using GarageBand in 2020 under an alias and uploading it to SoundCloud. After taking a break from music from 2021 to 2022, she began performing as Cece Natalie in mid-2022 and released her first song under the name, "I Wanna Be the Star", later that year. Her follow-up songs "Fashion Baby" and "Miracle" were released in November 2022 and October 2023, respectively. She also released music under the name Priscilla 1234 in early 2023. While working at the food court of an indoor trampoline park, Natalie released her debut studio album, Miss Behaves, on July 26, 2024, preceded by the 2023 singles "Gymnastics" and "Like a Taxi" and the 2024 singles "Ambulance" and "I Get Mad". It soon garnered a cult following online, with Ivan Guzman of Paper writing that it became "the 'iykyk' summer soundtrack for pop heads and SoundCloud deep divers alike"; Paper also included the album on their list of the best albums of the year. She released Recycling Bin Collection 2, a compilation album of unreleased songs, on November 5, 2024.

Natalie moved to Williamsburg, Brooklyn in April 2025 and released the singles "So Proud" and "Not Even Lying" in May and September of that year, respectively. She performed as a supporting act on the North American leg of Isabella Lovestory's Vanity Tour from September to October 2025. She signed with the talent agency Wasserman Music in the same month. In April 2026, she released the single "Domino". She performed as an opener for the American leg of PinkPantheress's 2026 An Evening With... PinkPantheress tour from April to May 2026. Her performances during the tour received criticism from users on TikTok and Reddit due to her lip syncing, with some describing them as "messy". Natalie denied online rumors that she was performing on drugs, writing that she was "just kind of weird" and "[got] tired on stage". She was included alongside the Deep on a remix of Lovestory's song "Gorgeous" released in May 2026. In August 2026 she signed with Columbia Records.

== Artistry ==
Natalie's music is largely pop with elements of bedroom pop, experimental pop, and R&B. It is influenced by music of the 2000s and the 2010s and often features Auto-Tuned vocals. She has described her music as Priscilla 1234 as house–influenced R&B.

Ferrentino has described the musical persona of Cece Natalie as the "fantasy version" of herself. Her music is largely self-produced and she has stated that her lyrics are mostly written spontaneously, likening her songwriting process to "speaking in tongues", and that she is typically high when coming up with ideas for songs. Prior to moving to New York City, she recorded her songs in her mother's Kia.

Writing for Paper, Guzman compared Natalie's music to that of Heidi Montag, Brooke Hogan, and Farrah Abraham. Allison Harris of Pitchfork described the lyrics of Miss Behaves as "bubbly" and "tongue-in-cheek" and its production style as "gritty", also writing that Natalie's songs became "darker and more melancholy" starting in 2025. For The Fader, Tobias Hess wrote that her "weird" and "messy" live performances in 2026 were "for better or worse, part of the recipe — and her appeal".

== Discography ==
=== Studio albums ===
List of studio albums with selected details
Title	Details
Miss Behaves	Released: July 26, 2024; Label: Self-released; Formats: LP, CD, digital download, streaming
Track listing: 1. "Limit"; 2. "Exitin"; 3. "Ambulance"; 4. "754"; 5. "Oh Oh"; 6. "Team Cece"; 7. "Romeo"; 8. "Like a Taxi (Oh Well)"; 9. "Tennis Court"; 10. "I Get Mad"; 11. "754 (Alternate)"; 12. "Lovely"; 13. "Gymnastics"

=== Compilation albums ===
List of studio albums with selected details
Title	Details
Recycling Bin Collection 2	Released: November 5, 2024; Label: Self-released; Formats: LP, digital download, streaming
Track listing: 1. "Muah"; 2. "By Chance" (with Jade Nicole); 3. "Cinderella"; 4. "The Bricks"; 5. "Smile"; 6. "Cute Knives"; 7. "Cloud 10"; 8. "I Used to Be a Waitress"; 9. "Holly Woods Christmas 1"; 10. "Lowerr"; 11. "Overdrive"; 12. "Unfortunate"; 13. "Gymnastics (Cece Natalie House Remix)"

=== Extended plays ===
List of studio albums with selected details
Title	Details
8 Songs	Released: December 26, 2025; Label: Self-released; Formats: Digital download, streaming
Track listing: 1. "U Wannaa"; 2. "All The Victims Of My Pen"; 3. "Ella Vader (Demo Version)"; 4. "Be Nice"; 5. "Mia The Exhibitionist"; 6. "Round & Around"; 7. "Not Even Lying (Demo)"; 8. "Straws (Alternate)"

=== Singles ===
List of singles
Title	Year	Album
"Fashion Baby"	2022	Non-album singles
"Do It So Right"	2023	Non-album singles
"Miracle"	2023	Non-album singles
"Like a Taxi (Oh Well)"	2023	Miss Behaves
"Crumbs" (with Jade Nicole)	2023	Non-album singles
"Alright"	2024	Non-album singles
"Ambulance"	2024	Miss Behaves
"I Get Mad"	2024	Miss Behaves
"(Be) Forever"	2024	Non-album single
"Telephone" (with Elxnce)	2024	Ridgeway Drive/Blurred Sentimentality
"So Proud"	2025	Non-album singles
"Not Even Lying"	2025	Non-album singles
"Spark"	2025	Non-album singles
"Domino"	2026	Non-album singles
"Gorgeous" (remix) (with Isabella Lovestory and the Deep)	2026	Non-album singles
"Flood Whole Towns"	2026	TBA
