= Turn It Up (PinkPantheress song) =

2024 single by PinkPantheress

Single by PinkPantheress
- Released: 24 May 2024
- Genre: Dance pop
- Length: 2:27
- Label: Warner UK
- Songwriters: PinkPantheress; Tom Snow; Franne Golde
- Producers: PinkPantheress; Kintaro; Mura Masa

PinkPantheress singles chronology
"Nice to Meet You" (2024)	"Turn It Up" (2024)	"Tonight" (2025)

Music video
- "Turn It Up" on YouTube

"Turn It Up" is a song by British singer-songwriter PinkPantheress. It was released on 24 May 2024 through Warner Records UK after being teased on TikTok two months prior. PinkPantheress wrote and produced the song with Mura Masa and Kintaro. The song samples Selena's "Dreaming of You," and Girls' Generation's "Genie". Its lyrics center around a girl named Maria who falls in love on the dance floor. It would peak at number 8 on the New Zealand Hot Singles chart and number 86 on the UK singles chart.

== Background and composition ==
PinkPantheress began teasing "Turn It Up" on her TikTok account in March 2024. After PinkPantheress finished her headlining Capable of Love Tour in April, "Turn It Up" was released as a single on 24 May 2024, her first single since the release of her debut studio album, Heaven Knows (2023). It was written and produced by PinkPantheress and co-produced by Kintaro and Mura Masa, the last of whom also mixed the song.

"Turn It Up", categorized as a "bubbly", and "speedy" song, contains samples of the songs "Dreaming of You" by Selena and "Genie" by Girls' Generation. "Turn It Up" runs for two minutes and 27 seconds. Its lyrics concern a girl named Maria, who falls in love with someone on the dance floor.

== Critical reception ==
Sydney Brasil of Exclaim! wrote that the song was "dredged in Y2K nostalgia" and that its cover art was reminiscent of "clip art" from "a Hannah Montana stationary set from Claire's in 2007". Samantha Olson of Cosmopolitan described the song as "put[ting] a new spin" on "Y2K nostalgia". Paper called it a "chilled dance" song.

== Charts ==
=== Weekly charts ===
Chart performance for "Turn It Up"
Chart (2023–2024)	Peak position
New Zealand Hot Singles (RMNZ)	8
UK Singles (Official Charts)	86
