= Entrapreneur =

Single by Central Cee
- Released: December 21, 2023
- Genre: UK drill
- Length: 2:24
- Label: Columbia
- Songwriter: Oakley Caesar-Su
- Producers: Chris Rich; Caleb Bryant

Central Cee singles chronology
"Nice to Meet You" (2023)	"Entrapreneur" (2023)	"I Will" (2024)

Music video
- "Entrapreneur" on YouTube

"Entrapreneur" is a song by British rapper Central Cee. It was released on 21 December 2023, through Columbia Records. The song reached number 36 on the UK Singles Chart and number six on the UK Hip Hop and R&B Singles Chart.

== Background and release ==
"Entrapreneur" portrays remarks about hustle and streetwear culture. It preceded with an intro by Mikey Trapstar. The music video was released alongside the song, and filmed at London, England and Rovaniemi, Finland. It was produced by Chris Rich and Caleb Bryant.

== Charts ==
Chart performance for "Entrapeneur"
Chart	Peak position
Canada (Canadian Hot 100)	58
New Zealand Hot Singles (RMNZ)	2
UK Singles (OCC)	36
UK Hip Hop/R&B (OCC)	6
