= Fancy Some More? =

Remix album by PinkPantheress
- Released: 10 October 2025
- Genre: UK garage
- Length: 92:40
- Label: Warner
- Producers: Aksel Arvid; The Dare; Count Baldor; Glasear; Jkarri; PinkPantheress; Phil; Oscar Scheller

PinkPantheress chronology
Fancy That (2025)	Fancy Some More? (2025)

Singles from Fancy Some More?
- 1. "Stateside + Zara Larsson" Released: 16 January 2026

Fancy Some More? is the second remix album by the British singer-songwriter and record producer PinkPantheress. It was released on 10 October 2025 through Warner Records. The vinyl release is split into three discs: Disc 1, featuring collaborations with various artists; Disc 2, featuring collaborations with DJs and producers; and Disc 3, consisting of the entirety of Fancy That.

The release, which runs for around 1 hour and 32 minutes, features collaborations with Anitta, Seventeen, Bladee, Oklou, Jade, Yves, Kylie Minogue, JT, Sugababes, Zara Larsson, Ravyn Lenae, Nia Archives, Rachel Chinouriri, Kaytranada, Basement Jaxx, Joe Goddard, DJ Caio Prince & Adame DJ, Mochakk, Loukeman & Leod, Sega Bodega, Groove Armada, and Kilimanjaro.

== Background and release ==
Following PinkPantheress's sophomore mixtape Fancy That, on 6 October, a remix album titled Fancy Some More? was announced with a release date of 10 October. PinkPantheress told Billboard about the project: "I wanted to explore how the songs can live in different worlds while still holding onto the emotion of the original. Hearing other artists reimagine it has been so inspiring. Each remix brings a new energy and texture, while still keeping the heart of the track intact. It's been so exciting to see Fancy That take on these new, international lives and global perspectives."

The Nia Archives remix of "Illegal" had previously been released on 27 June 2025. A music video for "Noises" with JT was released on 27 October 2025. On 15 January 2026, a music video for the Zara Larsson remix of "Stateside" was released, and the following day the song was sent to radio in Italy as the album's first official single.

The "Stateside + Zara Larsson" remix gained renewed popularity after 2x olympic gold medalist Alysa Liu performed to the track during the 2026 Winter Olympics figure skating exhibition gala, with clips of the performance quickly going viral across social media platforms and introducing the remix to a wider audience.

In 2026, the album was released on compact discs. The CD release is notable for fitting the entirety of Fancy Some More? onto a single disc, which was perceived as unusually high due to conventional CDs being able to hold 80 minutes of audio compared to the remix album's 92 minutes. The extended runtime was achieved via overburning and was described as boundary-pushing, though certain users reported playback issues.

== Critical reception ==
Professional ratings
Review scores
Source	Rating
Exclaim!	7/10
NME	3/5 stars
Pitchfork	7.6/10

Pitchfork's Shaad D'Souza, rated the remix album an 7.6/10 and praised the album saying; "Fancy Some More?, Pink's new Fancy That remix project, doesn't have the ultraconceptual bent of Charli XCX's Brat remix project from last year, but it moves with the same swagger: Like, who else would have the cheek, ingenuity, and clout to gather all these people under one roof?"

== Track listing ==
Fancy Some More? disc 1 track listing
No.	Title	Writer(s)	Producer(s)	Length
1.	"Illegal" (with Anitta)	Victoria Walker; Aksel Arvid; Darren Emerson; Karl Hyde; Richard Smith; Larissa de Macedo Machado	PinkPantheress; Aksel Arvid	2:29
2.	"Illegal" (with Seventeen)	V. Walker; Arvid; Emerson; Hyde; R. Smith; Robb Roy; Hansol Vernon Chwe	PinkPantheress; Arvid	2:47
3.	"Girl Like Me" (with Oklou)	V. Walker; Tom Parker; Felix Buxton; Simon Ratcliffe; Casey Manierka-Quaile; Marylou Mayniel	PinkPantheress; Arvid; Baldor; Phil^{[a]}	2:42
4.	"Tonight" (with Jade)	V. Walker; Arvid; Parker; Ryan Ross; Spencer Smith; Brendon Urie; Jon Walker; Jade Thirlwall	PinkPantheress; Arvid; Baldor; Phil^{[a]}	2:58
5.	"Stars" (with Yves)	V. Walker; Jack Allsopp; Buxton; Joshua Gaskin-Brown; Ratcliffe; John Ong; Ha Soo-young	Arvid; Glasear; Jkarri; PinkPantheress^{[a]}; Baldor^{[a]}; Phil^{[a]}	2:21
6.	"Noises" (with JT)	V. Walker; Arvid; Bell; Roland Chambers; Kendrick Davis; Kenny Gamble; Mark Onokey; Horace Walls III; Jatavia Johnson	PinkPantheress; Arvid; Phil^{[a]}	2:07
7.	"Nice to Know You" (with Sugababes)	V. Walker; Arvid; Anders Bagge; Arnthor Birgisson; Keisha Buchanan; Mutya Buena; Buxton; Ong; William Orbit; Karen Poole; Oscar Scheller; Pamela Sheyne; Ratcliffe; Siobhán Donaghy	PinkPantheress; Arvid; Scheller; Glasear^{[a]}; Loukman^{[a]}	2:49
8.	"Stateside" (with Kylie Minogue)	V. Walker; Caroline Ailin; Harrison Smith; Minogue; Sarah Hudson	PinkPantheress; Arvid; Jkaari; The Dare; Baldor^{[a]}; Phil^{[a]}	2:48
9.	"Stateside" (with Bladee)	V. Walker; Ailin; H. Smith; Benjamin Reichwald	PinkPantheress; Arvid; The Dare; Glasear; Baldor^{[a]}; Phil^{[a]}; Jkaari^{[a]}	2:28
10.	"Stateside" (with Zara Larsson)	V. Walker; Ailin; H. Smith; Uzoechi Emenike; Larsson	PinkPantheress; Scheller	3:04
11.	"Romeo" (with Ravyn Lenae)	V. Walker; Arvid; Buxton; Dill Aitchison; Ratcliffe; Ravyn Washington	PinkPantheress; Arvid; Phil	2:12
12.	"Romeo" (with Rachel Chinouriri)	V. Walker; Arvid; Buxton; Aitchison; Ratcliffe; Chinouriri	Arvid; Phil; APOB^{[a]}	2:46

Fancy Some More? disc 2 track listing
No.	Title	Writer(s)	Remixer(s)	Length
1.	"Illegal" (with Nia Archives)	V. Walker; Arvid; Emerson; Hyde; R. Smith	Nia Archives	2:40
2.	"Girl Like Me" (with Kaytranada)	V. Walker; Parker; Ratcliffe	Kaytranada	5:22
3.	"Tonight" (with Basement Jaxx)	V. Walker; Arvid; Parker; Ross; S. Smith; Urie; Walker	Basement Jaxx	4:59
4.	"Tonight" (with Joe Goddard)	V. Walker; Arvid; Parker; Ross; S. Smith; Urie; Walker	Joe Goddard	4:19
5.	"Stars" (with DJ Caio Prince and Adame DJ)	V. Walker; Allsopp; Buxton; Gaskin-Brown; Ong; Ratcliffe	DJ Caio Prince; Adame DJ	2:47
6.	"Noises" (with Mochakk)	V. Walker; Arvid; Bel; Chambers; Davis; Gamble; Mark Onokey; Walls III	Mochakk	6:31
7.	"Nice to Know You" (with Loukeman and Leod)	V. Walker; Arvid; Bagge; Birgisson; Buchanan; Buena; Buxton; Ong; Orbit; Poole; Scheller; Sheyne; Ratcliffe	Loukeman; Leod	3:22
8.	"Nice to Know You" (with Sega Bodega)	V. Walker; Arvid; Bagge; Birgisson; Buchanan; Buena; Buxton; Ong; Orbit; Poole; Scheller; Sheyne; Ratcliffe	Sega Bodega	2:26
9.	"Stateside" (with Groove Armada)	V. Walker; Ailin; H. Smith	Groove Armada	4:54
10.	"Romeo" (with Kilimanjaro)	V. Walker; Arvid; Buxton; Aitchison; Ratcliffe	Kilimanjaro	3:03
Total length:				92:40

Note

- ^{^[a]} signifies an additional producer.
- Featured credits are not enclosed in parentheses and are instead noted with a "+". For example "Illegal" (with Anitta), is stylised as "Illegal + Anitta".
- Disc 3 mirrors the track listing of Fancy That.

Sample credits

- "Illegal" contains a sample of "Dark & Long", by Underworld, written by Rick Smith, Karl Hyde and Darren Emerson.
- "Girl Like Me" contains samples of "Romeo" by Basement Jaxx, performed by Kele Le Roc and Corryne Dwyer, written by Felix Buxton and Simon Ratcliffe, and "Always Be There" by Basement Jaxx, performed by Monday Michiru, written by Felix Buxton and Simon Ratcliffe.
- "Tonight" contains a sample of "Do You Know What I'm Seeing?", performed by Panic! at the Disco, written by Brendon Urie, Ryan Ross, Spencer Smith and Jon Walker.
- "Stars" contains a sample of "Starz in Their Eyes", performed by Just Jack, written by Jack Allsopp, and "Oh My Gosh", by Basement Jaxx, performed by Vula Malinga and Skillah, written by Felix Buxton and Simon Ratcliffe.
- "Noises" contains samples of "Who Want Smoke?", performed by Nardo Wick, written by Horace Walls III and Mark Onokey, and "Suntoucher", performed by Groove Armada, written by Thomas Bell, Roland Chambers, Kendrick Davis, and Kenny Gamble.
- "Nice to Know You" contains samples of "Spiral", performed by William Orbit and Sugababes, written by William Orbit, Karen Poole, Keisha Buchanan and Mutya Buena, and "Irresistible", performed by Jessica Simpson, written by Anders Bagge, Arnthor Birgisson, and Pam Sheyne.
- "Stateside" contains a sample of "I See You Baby", performed by Groove Armada.
- "Romeo" contains a sample of "Good Luck", by Basement Jaxx, performed by Lisa Kekaula, written by Felix Buxton and Simon Ratcliffe.

== Personnel ==
Credits adapted from Tidal.

=== Disc 1 ===
- PinkPantheress – vocals (all tracks), programming (all tracks), vocal engineering (tracks 3, 7–12), engineering (track 1)
- Aksel Arvid – programming (tracks 1–4, 6–7, 11–12), vocal engineering (tracks 5–12)
- Anitta – vocals (track 1)
- Seventeeen – vocals (track 2)
- Oklou – vocals (track 3)
- Jade – vocals (track 4), vocal arrangement (track 4)
- Ramera Abraham – vocal arrangement (track 4), vocal production (track 4), vocal engineering (track 7), vocal recording engineer (track 7)
- Yves – vocals (track 5)
- Mura Masa – programming (track 5)
- Oscar Scheller – programming (tracks 5, 7)
- Phil – programming (tracks 5–6, 11)
- Horace Walls – vocals (track 6)
- JT – vocals (track 6)
- Sugababes – vocals (track 7)
- Loukman – programming (track 7)
- Kylie Minogue – vocals (track 8)
- Jkarri – guitar (track 8–10)
- Count Baldor – programming (track 8–10)
- The Dare – programming (track 8–10)
- Bladee – vocals (track 9)
- Zara Larsson – vocals (track 10)
- Ravyn Lenae – vocals (track 11)
- Rachel Chinouriri – vocals (track 12)
- APOB – vocal engineer (track 12)
- Colin Leonard – mastering
- Nickie Jon Pabón – mixing

=== Disc 2 ===
- PinkPantheress – vocals (all tracks), programming (all tracks), vocal engineering (tracks 1–4, 7–8, 10), engineering (track 3–4)
- Aksel Arvid – programming (tracks 1–4, 6–8, 10), vocal engineering (tracks 5–8, 10), engineering (track 1–4)
- Nia Archives – remixing (track 1)
- Kaytranada – remixing (track 2)
- Basement Jaxx – remixing (track 3)
- Joe Goddard – remixing (track 4)
- DJ Caio Prince – remixing (track 5)
- Adame DJ – remixing (track 5)
- Mura Masa – programming (track 5)
- Oscar Scheller – programming (tracks 5, 7–8)
- Mochakk – remixing (track 6)
- Phil – programming (tracks 6, 10)
- Horace Walls – vocals (track 6)
- Leod – remixing (track 7)
- Loukeman – programming (track 7–8), remixing (track 7)
- Sega Bodega – remixing (track 8)
- Groove Armada – remixing (track 9)
- Jkarri – guitar (track 9)
- Count Baldor – programming (track 9
- The Dare – programming (track 9)
- Kilimanjaro – remixing (track 10)
- Colin Leonard – mastering (1–5)
- Stuart Hawkes – mastering (track 7, 10)
- Matt Colton – mastering (track 9)
- Nickie Jon Pabón – mixing

== Charts ==
Chart performance for Fancy Some More?
Chart (2025–2026)	Peak position
Australian Albums (ARIA)	72
Canadian Albums (Billboard)	19
Croatian International Albums (HDU)	2
French Albums (SNEP)	51
Greek Albums (IFPI)	53
Hungarian Albums (MAHASZ)	16
New Zealand Albums (RMNZ)	26
US Billboard 200	30
US Top Dance Albums (Billboard)	1

== Certifications ==
Certifications for Fancy Some More?
Region	Certification	Certified units/sales
New Zealand (RMNZ)	Gold	7,500^{‡}
^{‡} Sales+streaming figures based on certification alone.
