= Mochakk =

Brazilian DJ and record producer

- Born: Pedro Luis Nunes Maia; September 21, 1999 (age 27); Sorocaba, São Paulo, Brazil
- Genres: House, tech house, techno
- Occupations: DJ, record producer
- Years active: 2014-present
- Website: mochakk.com

Pedro Luis Nunes Maia (born 21 September 1999 in Sorocaba, Brazil), known by the stage name Mochakk is a Brazilian DJ and music producer.

== Biography ==
Speaking of his upbringing, Mochakk noted that he developed a desire to play instruments early in his childhood and downloaded a mixing application on his mother's computer by the age of 12. He grew up in a music-filled home, influenced by his mother's love of funk and disco and his father's passion for rock and blues. He took it upon himself to continue his music education. From the age of eight to 11 he took electric guitar and drum lessons and by the age of 13, along with Street dance classes, he was making hip-hop beats. His penchant for rap and heavy kicks became a core element of his music. At the age of 15, he started DJing around São Paulo, and as he began releasing music, he quickly gained bookings across Brazil. Mochakk dropped out of fashion school and entered the university of music production.

In 2022, Mochakk gained international recognition after a viral TikTok video featuring his dance moves to PAWSA's "Roll Play" garnered 1.3 million likes. That year, he expanded his reach beyond Brazil and made his debut on DC-10 with Circoloco in Ibiza. He also launched his own label, MOTRAXX. Throughout 2023, he became a regular performer at Circoloco and organized his own series of events titled Mochakk Calling in various cities, including São Paulo, Miami, Lisbon, and New York. He appeared at festivals such as CRSSD, Time Warp, Primavera Sound, Kappa FuturFestival, Coachella, Sónar, was featured as a guest at a Peggy Gou event in London, and played back-to-back with Disclosure. In August, he released the single "Jealous," which samples Loleatta Holloway's 1977 track "Dreamin." Billboard praised the song as featuring "funky house production that's fun, fresh, and accessible," while EDM.com described it as "a collision course between groove, dance, funk and house."

In 2023, Mochakk released the track "Jealous" on Circoloco Records. He also made his debut on Defected Records, collaborating with Dogghauz label mates Jay Mariana and Cesar Nardini on a remix of the classic house track "Finally" by Kings Of Tomorrow and Julie McKnight. On 26 July 2024, Mochakk released the first part of his EP, Locomotiva Ibiza 2099, via Circoloco Records, which received critical acclaim and was noted by Mixmag to have "captivated audiences with its innovative sound and energy." The second part, Locomotiva Ibiza 2099 II, was released on 6 September 2024, featuring three new tracks, including "No Boys Allowed (OG House Mix)" with Canadian rapper Tommy Genesis and "Estribeira," featuring Brazilian artist Artisian.

In September 2024, Mochakk opened a club named OBLIQO in his hometown of Sorocaba. It launched with a party for his latest EP, Locomotiva Ibiza 2099 - Part II, featuring a gallery space dedicated to the history of electronic music in Brazil and workshops led by industry veterans.

In 2024, Mochakk was ranked #61 on DJ Mag's "Top 100 DJs" list.

Mochakk's DJ sets include classic house, tech-house, techno, Brazilian rap, American hip hop, and Latin rhythms. His skater boy aesthetic, influenced by his passion for skateboarding, permeates his visual style. His mentors and collaborators include Seth Troxler, Pete Tong, The Martinez Brothers and Chris Lake.

== Discography ==
=== Singles ===
- "Caribbean Queen" with Haas (2020)
- "Inflación" (2021)
- "Da Fonk" with Joni (2022) (Nervous Records)
- "False Need" (2022) (Black Book Records)
- "Jealous" (2023) (Circoloco Records)
- "Secret" with Breaking Beattz (2023) (Musical Freedom Records)
- "NO8DO" with Fernando Ouro (2023) (Cercle Records)

=== EPs ===
- Locomotiva Ibiza 2099 I (2024) (Circoloco Records)
- Locomotiva Ibiza 2099 II (2024)

=== Remixes ===
- Diplo ft. Nicky Da B - "Express Yourself (Mochakk Remix)" (2022)
- Louie Vega ft. Anane - "Cosmic Witch (Mochakk Remix)" (2023)
- Groove Armada - "Superstylin' (Mochakk Remix)" (2023)
- The Martinez Brothers & Gordo ft. Rema - "Rizzla (Mochakk Remix)" (2023)
- Foster the People - "Lost In Space (Mochakk Remix)" (2024)
- PinkPantheress - "Noises + Mochakk" (2025)
