= Fancy That =

Mixtape by PinkPantheress
- Released: 9 May 2025
- Recorded: 2024–2025
- Genres: UK garage; dance-pop
- Length: 20:33
- Label: Warner
- Producers: Aksel Arvid; The Dare; Count Baldor; Glasear; Jkarri; PinkPantheress; Phil; Oscar Scheller

PinkPantheress chronology
| Heaven Knows (Remixes) (2023) | Fancy That (2025) | Fancy Some More? (2025) |

Singles from Fancy That
- 1. "Tonight" Released: 4 April 2025; 2. "Stateside" Released: 25 April 2025; 3. "Illegal" Released: 6 June 2025; 4. "Girl Like Me" Released: 18 April 2026

Fancy That is the second mixtape by the British singer-songwriter and record producer PinkPantheress. It was released on 9 May 2025 through Warner Records. It marks her second album release, following her debut album To Hell with It (2021). The album, which runs for around 20 minutes, features production from PinkPantheress herself as well as Aksel Arvid, the Dare, Count Baldor, Glasear, Jkarri, Phil and Oscar Scheller.

PinkPantheress described Fancy That as the "most tied together project" of her career, and hoped that fans and listeners "can hear the signs of growth" in her as an artist. Upon release, it was met with critical acclaim and reached number three in the United Kingdom. It was shortlisted for the 2025 Mercury Prize and received nominations for Best Dance/Electronic Album and Best Dance Pop Recording for "Illegal" at the 68th Grammy Awards. The mixtape was supported by the An Evening With... PinkPantheress tour, which spanned from 18 September 2025 to 2 June 2026.

A remix album, titled Fancy Some More?, was released on 10 October 2025. Announced on 6 October, it features collaborations with Anitta, Seventeen, Bladee, Oklou, Jade, Yves, Kylie Minogue, JT, Sugababes, Zara Larsson, Ravyn Lenae, Nia Archives, Rachel Chinouriri, Kaytranada, Basement Jaxx, Joe Goddard, DJ Caio Prince & Adame DJ, Mochakk, Loukeman & Leod, Sega Bodega, Groove Armada, and Kilimanjaro.

== Background and release ==
Following the success of PinkPantheress's 2023 album, Heaven Knows, and her 2024 Capable Of Love Tour, PinkPantheress was launched to new global heights of popularity, notably with US top 10 single "Boy's a Liar Pt. 2". PinkPantheress first teased the release date of the mixtape in a cryptic Instagram post in March 2025. The lead single "Tonight" was released on April 4, a "clubby tune" that samples "Do You Know What I'm Seeing?" by Panic! at the Disco from their 2008 album Pretty. Odd., it was produced by PinkPantheress as well as Aksel Arvid and Count Baldor. On April 6, she shared the tracklist of the mixtape, which includes nine tracks. It also features the track "Romeo" which the singer had been teasing on her TikTok in April 2024. On April 18, the singer announced the release of the second single "Stateside", which was released on April 25. The album was released on 9 May 2025, alongside a music video for "Illegal".

A Japan edition of Fancy That was released on 18 February 2026, including a bonus track remix of "Tonight" with Japanese singer Thelma Aoyama.

== Music and artwork ==
Fancy That has been described as a UK garage and jungle-influenced pop and electronic record. The "Britain-coded" artwork, said to represent "everything kitsch and U.K.-centric," depicts the singer wearing the Imperial State Crown surrounded by a circle of flowers. For the project, she pulled from "more classic dance music," citing artists such as Basement Jaxx, Groove Armada and Fatboy Slim as her main inspiration. Her goal was to "make music where it sounds like a statement is being made with the songs" and wanted to "take on board" what appealed to her. The album features samples and interpolations from Basement Jaxx, Panic! at the Disco and Jessica Simpson.

== Commercial performance and promotion ==
Fancy That debuted at number three on the UK Albums Chart with first-week sales of 11,126 units, marking PinkPantheress's highest-charting album in her native country thus far. It replicated this performance in Scotland, where it also entered at number three, whilst debuting at number 31 in Ireland. On both the Australian ARIA Chart and New Zealand RMNZ Chart, the album debuted at number 12. In the US Fancy That debuted at number 72 on the Billboard 200, marking her third entry on the chart. ''Illegal'' became her second song to chart on the Billboard Hot 100, spending one week at number 96.

PinkPantheress made her television debut performing a medley of "Illegal", "Girl Like Me", and "Tonight" on The Tonight Show Starring Jimmy Fallon on July 30, 2025; the performance included audio samples from the video game Rhythm Heaven Fever (2011). In support of the mixtape, PinkPantheress embarked on the An Evening With... tour, which began on 18 September 2025 in London and concluded on 2 June 2026 in Berlin. A music video for "Romeo" was released on 13 August 2025. On 6 October 2025, a remix album titled Fancy Some More? was announced with a release date of 10 October. It features remixes with artists including Kylie Minogue, Seventeen, and Anitta. On 8 May 2026, a music video for "Girl Like Me", featuring Davina McCall, was released.

== Critical reception ==
Professional ratings
Aggregate scores
| Source | Rating |
|---|---|
| AnyDecentMusic? | 7.3/10 |
| Metacritic | 82/100 |
Review scores
| Source | Rating |
| AllMusic | 4/5 stars |
| Clash | 8/10 |
| DIY | 5/5 stars |
| The Guardian | 4/5 stars |
| NME | 4/5 stars |
| Pitchfork | 8.0/10 |
| Rolling Stone | 3.5/5 stars |

Upon release, Fancy That was met with acclaim from music critics. According to the review aggregator Metacritic, Fancy That received "universal acclaim" based on a weighted average score of 82 out of 100 from 11 critic scores.

Writing for Pitchfork, Harry Tafoya praised the mixtape for being "equally forthright about sex and desire," and that alongside its keyboard and bassline, Fancy That's composition would have been "unthinkable on her introverted early releases." Otis Robinson of DIY stated that PinkPantheress "scratches just about every nostalgic itch" with the work and that it stimulates the "emo-meets-jungle minimalism" heard on her debut album Heaven Knows. NME's Kyann-Sian Williams found it to be a "masterfully hypnotic and vibrant package," opining that its "bouncy 808s and gleaming melodies" transformed a "nostalgia trip into something fractured and emotionally raw."

Clash described the project as a "decisive shift" in PinkPantheress's career with its increasingly "deliberate" production, and particularly lauded its usage of samples to "tell stories rather than simply reference them." The Guardian's Alexis Petridis remarked that the mixtape was "fleeting but not lacking," "familiar but fresh," and centered "less on making grand statements than with immediacy and unforced fun." Will Hermes of Rolling Stone praised Fancy That's "melting pot culture" that the abundance of sampling helped create, though he noted that she "sounds like she’s aiming to beat AI at its own game, plasticizing her voice like some Siri short-circuiting on vodka-and-Red Bulls" on "Tonight" and "Stars". Writing for AllMusic, Paul Simpson called the mixtape PinkPantheress's "most carefree work" yet "still highly emotional," and deemed its sound to be a return to the production of To Hell with It.

=== Accolades ===
On 10 September 2025, Fancy That was announced as one of 12 nominees for the 2025 Mercury Prize.

| Publication | Accolade | Rank | Ref. |
|---|---|---|---|
| Billboard | The 50 Best Albums of 2025 | 7 | |
| Complex | The 50 Best Albums of 2025 | 9 | |
| Exclaim! | Exclaim!'s 50 Best Albums of 2025 | 3 | |
| The Forty-Five | The 45 Best Albums of 2025 | 7 | |
| The New York Times | Lindsay Zoladz's Best Albums of 2025 | 10 | |
| NME | The 50 Best Albums of 2025 | 10 | |
| Rolling Stone | The 100 Best Albums of 2025 | 23 | |
| Vogue | The 45 Best Albums of 2025 | —N/a | |
| Vulture | The Best Albums of 2025 | 9 | |

== Track listing ==
Fancy That track listing
| No. | Title | Lyrics | Music | Producer(s) | Length |
|---|---|---|---|---|---|
| 1. | "Illegal" | Victoria Walker | V. Walker; Darren Emerson; Karl Hyde; Richard Smith | PinkPantheress; Aksel Arvid | 2:29 |
| 2. | "Girl Like Me" | V. Walker | V. Walker; Tom Parker; Felix Buxton; Simon Ratcliffe | PinkPantheress; Arvid; Baldor; Phil^{[a]} | 2:24 |
| 3. | "Tonight" | V. Walker | V. Walker; Arvid; Parker; Ryan Ross; Spencer Smith; Brendon Urie; Jon Walker | PinkPantheress; Arvid; Baldor; Phil^{[a]} | 2:56 |
| 4. | "Stars" | V. Walker | V. Walker; Jack Allsopp; Buxton; Joshua Gaskin-Brown; John Ong; Ratcliffe | Glasear; Jkarri; PinkPantheress^{[a]}; Arvid^{[a]}; Baldor^{[a]}; Phil^{[a]} | 2:21 |
| 5. | "Intermission" | | Arvid; Dill Aitchison | Arvid; Phil | 0:24 |
| 6. | "Noises" | V. Walker; Horace Walls III | V. Walker; Arvid; Thomas Bell; Roland Chambers; Kendrick Davis; Kenny Gamble; Mark Onokey | PinkPantheress; Arvid; Phil^{[a]} | 1:44 |
| 7. | "Nice to Know You" | V. Walker | V. Walker; Arvid; Anders Bagge; Arnthor Birgisson; Keisha Buchanan; Mutya Buena; Ong; William Orbit; Karen Poole; Oscar Scheller; Pamela Sheyne | PinkPantheress; Arvid; Scheller; Glasear^{[a]}; Loukeman^{[a]} | 2:50 |
| 8. | "Stateside" | V. Walker; Caroline Ailin | V. Walker; Harrison Smith | PinkPantheress; Arvid; The Dare; Baldor^{[a]}; Phil^{[a]} | 2:48 |
| 9. | "Romeo" | V. Walker | V. Walker; Arvid; Buxton; Aitchison; Ratcliffe | PinkPantheress; Arvid; Phil | 2:34 |
| Total length: | | | | | 20:35 |

Fancy That – Japan bonus track
| No. | Title | Lyrics | Music | Length |
|---|---|---|---|---|
| 10. | "Tonight + Thelma Aoyama" | V. Walker; Aoyama; Cheney; Sunny Boy | V. Walker; Arvid; Parker; Ross; Smith; Urie; J. Walker | 2:57 |
| Total length: | | | | 23:32 |

Note

- ^{^[a]} signifies an additional producer.

Sample credits

- "Illegal" contains a sample of "Dark & Long", by Underworld, written by Rick Smith, Karl Hyde and Darren Emerson.
- "Girl Like Me" contains samples of "Romeo" by Basement Jaxx, performed by Kele Le Roc and Corryne Dwyer, written by Felix Buxton and Simon Ratcliffe, and "Always Be There" by Basement Jaxx, performed by Monday Michiru, written by Felix Buxton and Simon Ratcliffe.
- "Tonight" contains a sample of "Do You Know What I'm Seeing?", performed by Panic! at the Disco, written by Brendon Urie, Ryan Ross, Spencer Smith and Jon Walker.
- "Stars" contains a sample of "Starz in Their Eyes", performed by Just Jack, written by Jack Allsopp, and "Oh My Gosh", by Basement Jaxx, performed by Vula Malinga and Skillah, written by Felix Buxton and Simon Ratcliffe.
- "Noises" contains samples of "Who Want Smoke?", performed by Nardo Wick, written by Horace Walls III and Mark Onokey, and "Suntoucher", performed by Groove Armada, written by Thomas Bell, Roland Chambers, Kendrick Davis, and Kenny Gamble.
- "Nice to Know You" contains samples of "Spiral", performed by William Orbit and Sugababes, written by William Orbit, Karen Poole, Keisha Buchanan and Mutya Buena, and "Irresistible", performed by Jessica Simpson, written by Anders Bagge, Arnthor Birgisson, and Pam Sheyne.
- "Stateside" contains a sample of "I See You Baby", performed by Groove Armada.
- "Romeo" contains a sample of "Good Luck", by Basement Jaxx, performed by Lisa Kekaula, written by Felix Buxton and Simon Ratcliffe.

== Personnel ==
Credits adapted from Tidal.

- PinkPantheress – vocals (all tracks), programming (tracks 1–3, 6–9), vocal engineering (1–3, 7–9), engineering (3)
- Aksel Arvid – programming (tracks 1–3, 5–7, 9), engineering (1–3), vocal engineering (4, 6–9)
- Joe LaPorta – mastering
- Nickie Jon Pabón – mixing
- Phil – programming (tracks 4–6, 9)
- Oscar Scheller – programming (tracks 4, 7)
- Mura Masa – programming (track 4)
- Horace Walls – vocals (track 6)
- Loukman – programming (track 7)
- Jkarri – guitar (track 8)
- Count Baldor – programming (track 8)
- The Dare – programming (track 8)

== Charts ==
=== Weekly charts ===
Weekly chart performance for Fancy That
| Chart (2025–2026) | Peak position |
|---|---|
| Australian Albums (ARIA) | 6 |
| Belgian Albums (Ultratop Flanders) | 75 |
| Belgian Albums (Ultratop Wallonia) | 107 |
| Canadian Albums (Billboard) | 51 |
| Croatian International Albums (HDU) | 3 |
| Dutch Albums (Album Top 100) | 14 |
| French Albums (SNEP) | 112 |
| German Albums (Offizielle Top 100) | 33 |
| German Pop Albums (Offizielle Top 100) | 13 |
| Hungarian Physical Albums (MAHASZ) | 16 |
| Irish Albums (Official Charts) | 31 |
| Japanese Western Albums (Oricon) | 12 |
| Lithuanian Albums (AGATA) | 41 |
| New Zealand Albums (RMNZ) | 12 |
| Portuguese Albums (AFP) | 82 |
| Scottish Albums (Official Charts) | 3 |
| Spanish Albums (PROMUSICAE) | 88 |
| Swiss Albums (Schweizer Hitparade) | 46 |
| UK Albums (Official Charts) | 3 |
| UK Dance Albums (Official Charts) | 4 |
| US Billboard 200 | 57 |
| US Top Dance Albums (Billboard) | 2 |

=== Year-end charts ===
Year-end chart performance for Fancy That
| Chart (2025) | Position |
|---|---|
| US Top Dance Albums (Billboard) | 22 |

== Certifications ==
Certifications for Fancy That
| Region | Certification | Certified units/sales |
|---|---|---|
| United Kingdom (BPI) | Gold | 100,000^{‡} |
^{‡} Sales+streaming figures based on certification alone.
