= Girl Like Me (PinkPantheress song) =

2026 single by PinkPantheress

Single by PinkPantheress

from the album Fancy That
- B-side: "Girl Like Me + Kaytranada"
- Released: 18 April 2026
- Genre: Dance-pop; UK garage
- Length: 2:25
- Label: Warner
- Songwriters: PinkPantheress; Tom Parker; Felix Buxton; Simon Ratcliffe
- Producers: PinkPantheress; Aksel Arvid; Count Baldor

PinkPantheress singles chronology
"Stateside + Zara Larsson" (2026)	"Girl Like Me" (2026)	"Sexy Magic" (2026)

Music video
- "Girl Like Me" on YouTube

"Girl Like Me" is a song by British singer-songwriter and record producer PinkPantheress. It first appeared on her second mixtape, Fancy That, released on 9 May 2025, through Warner Records. The song was later released as the mixtape's fourth and final single on 18 April 2026, nearly a year later. "Girl Like Me" was produced by PinkPantheress, Aksel Arvid and Count Baldor in collaboration with Felix Buxton and Simon Ratcliffe of the electronic music duo Basement Jaxx, who are credited as songwriters.

A dance-pop and UK garage track that builds on two songs by the duo, "Romeo" and "Always Be There", "Girl Like Me" addresses emotional vulnerability in a mismatched relationship. It was well-received by fans and critics, becoming a popular trend on TikTok and Instagram. The song made its debut on the UK singles chart in May 2026, shortly after the release of its music video.

== Background and production ==
"Girl Like Me" has been described by Andrew Braithwaite of Music Talkers as a modern take on early 2000s dance music, combining fast-paced UK garage and production inspired by drum and bass with "soft, almost whispered vocals". Record Store Day advertises the single as "jittery" and "UK garage-infused". The song features a sample from the Basement Jaxx song "Always Be There", while its hook builds on the line "Let it all go" from their song "Romeo". Daniel Griffiths of MusicRadar argued that the song likely uses the line as a vocal recreation rather than as a sample, with the melody in F♯/A instead of the original's F♯/A♭. In an interview with Mixmag, PinkPantheress cited "Romeo" as a personal favourite.

PinkPantheress spent time in the recording studio with Basement Jaxx while producing Fancy That, and "Girl Like Me" is one of four tracks on the mixtape to sample their music, alongside "Stars", "Nice to Know You" and "Romeo". (Note: Despite sharing the title, the track "Romeo" contains a sample of the Basement Jaxx song "Good Luck" instead.)

They were very pivotal in my learning. I went in there to make beats and songs with them, but I ended up leaving by just seeing their creative process and style and picking their brains... I ended up sampling them.

— PinkPantheress on Basement Jaxx, Mixmag

A review of Fancy That in the Financial Times found that the song's lyrics explore emotional vulnerability and "modern romantic confusion". According to Kiana Doyle of the Associated Press, the song sees PinkPantheress "putting her foot down" in a complicated relationship: "I'm not a fan of the way we're moving." PinkPantheress wanted the lyrics to resonate more with a modern audience, claiming that her lyrical references are usually "quite dated".

Lyrically, I wanted a song which was like a little bit more Gen Z vibes with how I'm discussing a relationship. [...] This one, I was like, 'How do I kind of [make it] more current? I'm talking about going to therapy, etc.'

— PinkPantheress, Capital

== Release ==
An early version of "Girl Like Me" could be heard in a video posted on PinkPantheress's official TikTok account on 13 July 2024. Prior to the release of Fancy That, the song was part of a DJ mix by Apocalypse Liao with PinkPantheress on The Lot Radio on 28 March 2025. "Girl Like Me" became a fan favourite after appearing as the second track on Fancy That, released on 9 May. The mixtape was later accompanied by a remix album titled Fancy Some More?, released on 10 October, featuring a remix of the song with vocals by Oklou, alongside another remix by Kaytranada.

"Girl Like Me" earned over 1 million streams in the United States during the week of 10 April 2026. That number climbed to 1.69 million two weeks later after being released as a single, and to 2.85 million in the week of 8 May, after the release of its music video. The song made its debut at number 81 on the UK singles chart the following week, eventually peaking at number 65. It also reached number 11 on the UK Dance Singles chart and number nine on Billboard's US Hot Dance/Pop Songs chart. A mashup of "Girl Like Me" and the song "Under Your Spell" by American electronic music duo Snow Strippers became a trend on TikTok, being featured in over 125,000 clips. "Girl Like Me" also became viral on Instagram, with over 12,000 reels using the song as background music. The song was issued by Warner Records as a single on 18 April in the form of a red limited edition 7-inch vinyl record. The vinyl release commemorated Record Store Day, which took place on the same date.

== Critical reception ==
In a review of Fancy That for Pitchfork, Harry Tafoya described "Girl Like Me" as a "roaring speed garage banger". The i Paper's Emily Bootle described the song as a "perfect, spluttering pop-dance track". Ashley Rophina of Clash described the song as "dancefloor euphoria laced with heartbreak". Writing for AllMusic, Paul Simpson also praised the song's club music potential, calling it "particularly Ibiza-friendly". Karly Quadros of Paste was more critical of PinkPantheress's sampling-heavy production style, writing that "the singalong of 'let it all go' feels a little clunkier the second time around".

== Music video ==
Directed by Laurie Lotus under the pseudonym Lauzza, the music video was released on 8 May 2026 to mark one year since the release of Fancy That. It was partly filmed in Los Angeles, and features cameos by British television presenter and long-time Big Brother host Davina McCall. The video centres on a "street setting of nondescript houses" in a "surreal, rhythm-driven world", and contains several references to British culture, including infantry foot guards, London Underground signs and Mini Coopers.

The video was inspired by the Rhythm Heaven video game series, and its choreography and special effects were designed to match the rhythm-driven gameplay prominent in the series, which focuses on executing random actions on beat. In an interview with the video's visual effects supervisor, Michos, Paul Moore of It's Nice That compared the video's hyperactive and "bouncy" visuals to the work of digital artist Cyriak. The use of 3D graphics was minimised in favour of real footage and the video's production was coordinated over the instant messaging platform Discord. After the video's release, Michos shared a proof-of-concept from March 2026 of the "world split" effect used throughout the video, on the social network X.

A set composed of multi-coloured boxes shown in the video has drawn comparisons to the music video for "One Room Disco" by the Japanese pop band Perfume. A similar set of coloured boxes was previously used during PinkPantheress's television debut on the Tonight Show Starring Jimmy Fallon on 30 July 2025, where she performed a medley of "Illegal", "Girl Like Me" and "Tonight".

Paul Moore of It's Nice That found the video to be an example of how PinkPantheress's personality is "nostalgic for late 2000s British kitsch". Ella Dorn from the New Statesman wrote that the music video evokes a "pre-Brexit utopia, with a sense of cultural flourishing and central patriotic spirit that was arguably last on display during the 2012 Olympics".

== Track listing ==
7-inch vinyl single (Record Store Day, limited edition) (Note: Citations for the format and durations)

1. "Girl Like Me" – 2:25
2. "Girl Like Me + Oklou" – 2:42
3. "Girl Like Me + Kaytranada" – 4:53

== Personnel ==
Credits shown below are adapted from Qobuz.

- PinkPantheress – vocals, songwriter, producer, vocal engineer, programmer
- Aksel Arvid – engineer, producer, programmer
- Colin Leonard – mastering engineer
- Count Baldor – producer, songwriter
- Nickie Jon Pabón – mixing engineer
- Phil – additional producer
- Felix Buxton – songwriter
- Simon Ratcliffe – songwriter

== Charts ==
Weekly chart performance
Chart (2025–2026)	Peak position
Ireland (IRMA)	95
UK Singles (Official Charts)	61
UK Dance (Official Charts)	11
US Hot Dance/Pop Songs (Billboard)	9

== Certifications ==
Certifications for "Girl Like Me"
Region	Certification	Certified units/sales
United Kingdom (BPI)	Silver	200,000^{‡}
^{‡} Sales+streaming figures based on certification alone.
