= Tonight (PinkPantheress song) =

2025 single by PinkPantheress

Single by PinkPantheress

from the album Fancy That
- Released: 4 April 2025
- Genre: Dance; dance-pop; house; bassline
- Length: 2:54
- Label: Warner
- Songwriters: PinkPantheress; Aksel Arvid; Count Baldor; Brendon Urie; Ryan Ross; Spencer Smith; Jon Walker
- Producers: PinkPantheress; Aksel Arvid; Count Baldor

PinkPantheress singles chronology
"Turn It Up" (2024)	"Tonight" (2025)	"Stateside" (2025)

Music video
- "Tonight" on YouTube

"Tonight" is a song by British singer and songwriter PinkPantheress. It was released through Warner Records on 4 April 2025 as the lead single from her second mixtape, Fancy That (2025). PinkPantheress wrote and produced the song with Aksel Arvid and Count Baldor. Musically, "Tonight" is a dance, dance-pop, house, and bassline track that features synthesisers and four-on-the-floor beats. It samples orchestral arrangements and strings from Panic! at the Disco's song "Do You Know What I'm Seeing?" (2008), written by Brendon Urie, Ryan Ross, Spencer Smith, and Jon Walker. In the lyrics, the song's narrator makes sexual advances towards her crush.

Music critics generally praised "Tonight" for its production and PinkPantheress's vocal performance; Slant Magazine's staff named it the best song of 2025. Commercially, the track reached the national charts of Ireland and the United Kingdom. The song's music video depicts PinkPantheress and her friends hosting a rowdy party at a manor house, where they kiss passionately and engage in pillow fights. The period drama–inspired video contains various fashion and aesthetic choices that evoke the Regency era and the television series Bridgerton. It received nominations at the UK Music Video Awards and the Electronic Dance Music Awards. PinkPantheress included "Tonight" in the set list of her third concert tour, An Evening With... PinkPantheress (2025–2026), and performed it at several other events.

== Background and release ==
PinkPantheress released her debut mixtape, To Hell with It, on 15 October 2021, followed by her debut studio album, Heaven Knows, on 10 November 2023. She revealed that she was working on new music in July 2024, before cancelling her remaining 2024 concerts to focus on her health. She tweeted images of herself in a studio in January 2025, writing, "Oh, we are soooo back! [...] Thanks for waiting on me". In an interview with Mixmag in March of that year, she said that she had been writing about "letting expectations go" and "trying to strike a balance between being a pop star and also being experimental".

PinkPantheress released "Tonight" digitally on 4 April 2025 as the lead single from her second mixtape, Fancy That (2025). Warner Records promoted the song to Italian radio airplay on 11 April 2025. On 10 October 2025, a remix featuring English singer Jade Thirlwall and two remixes by Basement Jaxx and Joe Goddard were released as part of Fancy Some More?, the remix edition of Fancy That. "Tonight" reached the national charts of the United Kingdom (35) and Ireland (88). In the United States, the track peaked at number 5 on the Hot Dance/Pop Songs chart and number 25 on the Bubbling Under Hot 100 Singles chart. "Tonight" also reached number 7 on the New Zealand Hot Singles chart, number 12 on the Japan Hot Overseas chart, and number 65 on the Lithuania Airplay chart.

== Production and composition ==
When I made 'Tonight', I felt like I kind of figured out what I was trying to do here. I wanted to strike a balance between sounding more polished and mature, but still sounding like me, and still with a lot of that U.K. influence.

— PinkPantheress, Vogue

PinkPantheress wrote and produced "Tonight" with Aksel Arvid and Count Baldor. The track samples orchestral arrangements and strings from Panic! at the Disco's song "Do You Know What I'm Seeing?" from their album Pretty. Odd. (2008), written by Brendon Urie, Ryan Ross, Spencer Smith, and Jon Walker. PinkPantheress engineered and programmed "Tonight" with Arvid, while producer Phil provided additional production. The song was mixed by Nickie Jon Pabón and mastered by Colin Leonard.

"Tonight"
A sample of the refrain of "Tonight", featuring synthesisers, four-on-the-floor beats, and a dance-heavy production

"Tonight" is 2 minutes and 54 seconds long. Prior to its release, PinkPantheress wrote on social media, "Ion [I don't] wanna see no more song length jokes after this song comes out on Friday", alluding to her songs usually being about 2 minutes and 30 seconds long. "Tonight" is a synth-driven dance, dance-pop, house, and bassline track with four-on-the-floor beats, hyperpop vocals, and UK garage and drum and bass influences. The song begins with orchestral strings before transitioning into its dance–heavy production. Critics described its bass part as "thumping", "hefty", "groovy", "wonky", and "bubbly".

In the lyrics, the song's narrator flirts with her shy crush; she "chucks her charming innocence and cuts to the chase" in the refrain: "You want sex with me? Huh? / Come talk to me, come on". PinkPantheress stated that she wanted the narrator to be "the one in control", unlike her previous songs in which "the ball is in the other person's court". Jon Pareles of The New York Times wrote that PinkPantheress's vocals on the track were "almost nonchalant", while Rolling Stone's Will Hermes believed that she was "plasticizing her voice". Alexis Petridis of The Guardian thought that the lyrics of "Tonight" referenced the songs "Complicated" (2002) by Avril Lavigne and "Sex on Fire" (2008) by Kings of Leon.

== Critical reception ==
Music critics generally praised "Tonight" for its production and PinkPantheress's vocal performance. Robin Murray of Clash dubbed it a "ridiculously infectious [...] dose of pop futurism that arrives with a sly grin on its face", and Sal Cinquemani of Slant Magazine described it as an "unabashed sex song". Zachary Horvath from HotNewHipHop praised the song's overall sound and thought that it exemplified PinkPantheress's "addicting" production style and "wildly entrancing" vocal delivery. NME's Kyann-Sian Williams commended its adrenaline-pumping atmosphere, and Pitchfork's Harry Tafoya deemed the track "impressive" and lauded how "the fast-paced thump mirrors a dawning sense of romantic urgency." Elaina Bernstein from Hypebeast, Derrick Rossignol from Uproxx, and the staff of Consequence selected "Tonight" as one of the best songs of its release week. Consequence praised PinkPantheress's "feathery" vocals and the combination of baroque strings with club–driven beats. Billboard listed "Tonight" as one of their "R&B/Hip-Hop Fresh Picks of the Week", with Michael Saponara lauding its production and mature narrative. Wonderland similarly commended its production and "playful" lyrics, including "Tonight" on their list of the best newly released songs.

In June 2025, "Tonight" was picked as one of the best songs of the year by Billboard (20 out of 50) and Consequence (24 out of 100). Paolo Ragusa from the latter publication commended PinkPantheress's "honeyed vocals and untouchable attitude" and the song's "roomy, nostalgic production", although he thought that the track was "relatively straightforward" overall. Publications such as NME, Vogue, Cosmopolitan, and Exclaim! picked "Tonight" as one of the "songs of the summer". Vogue's Liam Hess deemed it the highlight of Fancy That, describing it as a "three-minute slice of pop perfection" and praising its composition and catchy refrain. NME's Karen Gwee described it as "light and addictive", while Cosmopolitan's Samantha Olson stated that it "makes a Panic! at the Disco sample sound like a voguing track made for endless nights breaking a sweat on the dance floor." Maria Sherman from the Associated Press picked "Tonight" as the "song of the summer for the chronically online". Slant Magazine's staff named it the best song of 2025, with Paul Attard adding that it featured "the stickiest and steamiest hook of the year".

== Music video ==
The music video for "Tonight", directed by Charlotte Rutherford, was released on 4 April 2025, the same day as the song's release. PinkPantheress stated that she wanted to make a "more classic pop video, where you have sets and you have a different hairstyle than usual and a dress that looks like something you wouldn't wear." The music video depicts PinkPantheress and her friends riding on bicycles and carriages to a manor house, where they throw a chaotic party, kiss passionately, and engage in pillow fights. At the party, a DJ spins records on a phonograph, a woman's hair sets on fire, and a man inside of a portrait steps out of it. The costumes in the period drama–inspired video incorporate corsets, powdered wigs, and pearls, which media publications described as reminiscent of the Regency era (Note: References:) and the television series Bridgerton. (Note: References:) PinkPantheress revealed that the music video was inspired by Bridgerton and the music video for Jamiroquai's song "King for a Day" (1999), the latter of which showcases elements from the Georgian era. The dance that PinkPantheress performed in the music video went viral on the online video platform TikTok following her dance challenges with other celebrities, including American rapper Doechii. The music video was nominated for Best Pop Video – UK at the 2025 UK Music Video Awards and Music Video of the Year at the 2026 Electronic Dance Music Awards.

== Live performances ==
PinkPantheress performed "Tonight" at the Glastonbury Festival on 27 June 2025. On 30 July 2025, she sang it on The Tonight Show Starring Jimmy Fallon as part of a medley with the Fancy That tracks "Illegal" and "Girl Like Me", accompanied by a DJ and several backup dancers. PinkPantheress played a stripped-down version of "Tonight" on NPR's Tiny Desk Concerts in September 2025, joined by a backup band. On 8 October 2025, she performed the track on BBC Radio 1's Live Lounge. PinkPantheress included "Tonight" in the set list of her third concert tour, An Evening With... PinkPantheress (2025–2026), including shows in the UK and North America. She was accompanied by two dancers dubbed "the Pinkettes".

== Credits and personnel ==
Credits shown below are adapted from Qobuz.

- PinkPantheress – vocals, songwriter, producer, engineer, vocal engineer, programmer
- Aksel Arvid – songwriter, producer, engineer, programmer
- Count Baldor – songwriter, producer
- Colin Leonard – mastering engineer
- Nickie Jon Pabón – mixing engineer
- Phil – additional producer
- Brendon Urie – songwriter
- Ryan Ross – songwriter
- Spencer Smith – songwriter
- Jon Walker – songwriter

== Charts ==
Chart performance for "Tonight"Weekly chart performance for "Tonight"
Chart (2025–2026)	Peak position
Ireland (IRMA)	88
Japan Hot Overseas (Billboard Japan)	12
Lithuania Airplay (TopHit)	65
New Zealand Hot Singles (RMNZ)	7
Nicaragua Anglo Airplay (Monitor Latino)	2
UK Singles (Official Charts)	35
US Bubbling Under Hot 100 (Billboard)	25
US Hot Dance/Pop Songs (Billboard)	5

== Certifications ==
Certifications for "Tonight"
Region	Certification	Certified units/sales
United Kingdom (BPI)	Silver	200,000^{‡}
^{‡} Sales+streaming figures based on certification alone.
