= Where You Are (PinkPantheress song) =

Single by PinkPantheress featuring Willow
- Released: 22 April 2022
- Genre: Electronic pop
- Length: 2:33; 3:12 (video version)
- Label: Elektra; Parlophone
- Songwriters: PinkPantheress; Willow Smith; Alexander Crossan; Sonny Moore; Hayley Williams; Joshua Farro
- Producers: PinkPantheress; Mura Masa; Skrillex

PinkPantheress singles chronology
"Bbycakes" (2022)	"Where You Are" (2022)	"Picture in My Mind" (2022)

Willow singles chronology
"Psychofreak" (2022)	"Where You Are" (2022)	"Memories" (2022)

Music video
- "Where You Are" on YouTube

"Where You Are" is a song by British singer-songwriter PinkPantheress featuring American singer Willow. It was released on 22 April 2022, through Elektra Records and Parlophone. The song samples "Never Let This Go" by American rock band Paramore.

== Background and release ==
In January 2022, PinkPantheress revealed that she had a collaboration with Willow in the works. PinkPantheress continued teasing the song until April 2022, when she announced its release for 22 April. The song was released on that day through Elektra and Parlophone.

== Composition ==
PinkPantheress, Mura Masa, and Skrillex produced "Where You Are". The three of them are credited as writers on the song, along with featured artist Willow and American rock band Paramore, for the sampling of their 2005 track "Never Let This Go". The song's structure follows PinkPantheress' usual formula, with musical elements such as synths and a drum machine beat that recall hit songs from the early 2000s. A guitar was also used. The lyrics of "Where You Are" show PinkPantheress and Willow longing for their past partners back. PinkPantheress sings: "please tell me that you want to meet again"; Willow tormentedly cries out: "now my life's a downward spiral", in contrast with the lead artist's soft vocals. Willow's part of the song was described as angsty. Chris DeVille of Stereogum opined that the song was a more "haunted version" of her 2021 single "Just for Me". The song's genre is electronic-pop. It contains elements of UK garage, pop-punk, '90s club music and hyperpop. The song's video version runs for three minutes and twelve seconds, which is unusual as PinkPantheress normally makes short-form songs.

== Critical reception ==
In Clash, Robin Murray called the song "a deeply addictive single", as well as "an unruly pop moment that dismisses the rules and embraces freedom". Dork called the track "reassuringly classic", and complimented the prospect of two distinct artists collaborating. Rob H. of Beats Per Minute called the song "an absolute jam". American Songwriter's Sam Long called PinkPantheress's vocals on the track "angelic", and the single as a whole "hypnotic".

== Charts ==
Chart performance for "Where You Are"
Chart (2021)	Peak position
Ireland (IRMA)	49
New Zealand Hot Singles (RMNZ)	8
UK Singles (Official Charts)	58
US Hot Rock & Alternative Songs (Billboard)	22
