= Mosquito (song) =

2023 song by PinkPantheress

Single by PinkPantheress

from the album Heaven Knows
- Released: 29 September 2023
- Recorded: 2022–2023
- Genre: R&B; UK garage
- Length: 2:26
- Label: Warner UK
- Songwriters: Victoria Walker; Oscar Scheller; Greg Kurstin
- Producers: Greg Kurstin; PinkPantheress

PinkPantheress singles chronology
"Turn Your Phone Off" (2023)	"Mosquito" (2023)	"Capable of Love" (2023)

Music video
- "Mosquito" on YouTube

"Mosquito" is a song by British singer-songwriter and record producer PinkPantheress. It was released on 29 September 2023 through Warner Records UK as the second single from her debut studio album Heaven Knows. The bossa nova-inspired R&B and UK garage song was produced by Greg Kurstin; its lyrics personify money as a lover that PinkPantheress hopes not to lose. Early versions of the song were posted on her TikTok account in 2022. Its release coincided with that of its music video, which featured her alongside actresses Charithra Chandran, India Amarteifio, and Yara Shahidi going on a high-end shopping spree together in London. "Mosquito" peaked at number 74 on the UK Singles Chart. A remix by South African producer River Moon was featured on the parent album's remix project, Heaven Knows (Remixes).

== Background and composition ==
A snippet of an early version of "Mosquito" soundtracked a TikTok video posted by PinkPantheress in June 2022. Another version of the song featuring a toned-down beat was posted to TikTok by her in October 2022. "Mosquito" was released as the second single from PinkPantheress's debut studio album, Heaven Knows, on September 29, 2023 and was written and produced by PinkPantheress and Greg Kurstin. It is an R&B and UK garage song with an "airy" drum and bass, bossa nova-inspired beat, consisting of "clean" Spanish guitars, uptempo drum programming, and record scratches. In its lyrics, PinkPantheress characterizes her money as an unrequited love and worries about not being able to hold onto it, such as in the song's chorus, wherein she expresses only being concerned about her death because it would separate her from money: "What happened to me? I just had a dream I was dead / And I only cared 'cause I was taken from you / You're the only thing that I own, I hear my bell ring, I'd only answer for you..." Robin Murray of Clash described PinkPantheress's vocals on the song as "understated" and "classy". For NPR, Hazel Cills described "Mosquito" as "crunchy, acoustic '00s pop" combined with breakbeats.

== Critical reception ==
Andy Steiner of Paste wrote that "Mosquito" combined PinkPantheress's "expertise at texture with knockout hooks" and named it one of the best songs on Heaven Knows. Charles Lyons-Burt of Slant wrote that the "melodramatic fatalism" of the song felt "unearned" among other songs on Heaven Knows.

== Music video ==
An accompanying music video for "Mosquito" was directed by Sophie Muller and released on the same day as the song. It stars PinkPantheress and actresses Charithra Chandran, India Amarteifio, and Yara Shahidi going on a shopping spree at designer stores in London, including at the Royal Arcade and on New Bond Street. The video also features product placement for Valentino and Fendi and also focuses on a small ceramic bird. Larisha Paul of Rolling Stone and Neville Hardman of Alternative Press compared the video to shopping spree scenes common in romantic comedies of the early 2000s. Hardman praised the video as "fun" and "the real highlight" of the song's release.

== Charts ==
Chart performance for "Mosquito"
Chart (2023)	Peak position
Ireland (IRMA)	98
Japan Hot Overseas (Billboard Japan)	20
New Zealand Hot Singles (RMNZ)	6
UK Singles (OCC)	74
