= Stateside (song) =

2025 single by PinkPantheress

Single by PinkPantheress

from the album Fancy That
- B-side: "Tonight"
- Released: 25 April 2025
- Genre: Big beat; drum and bass
- Length: 2:48
- Label: Warner
- Songwriters: PinkPantheress; Caroline Ailin; Harrison Patrick Smith; Karen Poole
- Producers: PinkPantheress; Aksel Arvid; Harrison Patrick Smith; Jkarri

PinkPantheress singles chronology
"Tonight" (2025)	"Stateside" (2025)	"Illegal" (2025)

Music video
- "Stateside" on YouTube

"Stateside" is a song by British singer-songwriter and record producer PinkPantheress. It was released on 25 April 2025 through Warner Records as the second single from her second mixtape Fancy That. The song was produced by Aksel Arvid, Harrison Patrick Smith, Jkarri, and PinkPantheress, and was written by PinkPantheress, Caroline Ailin, Harrison Patrick Smith, and Karen Poole.

"Stateside" is a big beat and drum and bass song with elements of R&B, which lyrically explores what it is like "to be in the early stages of a crush". Commercially, the track reached number three on the UK Singles Chart and the Irish Singles Chart, number five in New Zealand, number eight in Germany, and number ten in Austria. On January 16 2026, a version of the song featuring Swedish singer-songwriter Zara Larsson was released as a single, which is included on PinkPantheress' remix album Fancy Some More?. The remix achieved broad commercial success and peaked at the top of the Billboard Global 200 chart.

== Background and release ==
On 18 April 2025, PinkPantheress announced the release date for "Stateside" on her social media, in collaboration with the music organisation app, [untitled]. She later described the track as her "favorite song off [Fancy That]", which "explores [her] growth as an artist". The track samples Adina Howard's 1995 song "Freak like Me", and Groove Armada's "I See You Baby" (1999).

=== Remixed versions ===
On 8 October 2025, PinkPantheress announced that she would be releasing a remix album of the songs from her mixtape Fancy That, titled Fancy Some More?, and that the project would feature collaborations with a variety of different artists, including Jade, the Sugababes, Kylie Minogue, Rachel Chinouriri, Zara Larsson, and Anitta, among others. The remix album was released on 10 October, and includes four new versions of the song, featuring the artists Bladee, Groove Armada, Minogue, and Larsson, respectively.

== Music video ==
The music video for "Stateside" was released alongside the song on 25 April 2025, and was directed by Emma Berson. In a social media post, PinkPantheress stated that the video was shot "outside JCPenney". The video was described by Euphoria magazine as "[showing] us the kind of “American hot, hot boys” she’s singing about".

== Track listing ==
Digital download/streaming

1. "Stateside" – 2:48
2. "Tonight" – 2:54

Digital download/streaming – Bladee remix

1. "Stateside + Bladee" – 2:28

Digital download/streaming – Groove Armada remix

1. "Stateside + Groove Armada" – 4:54

Digital download/streaming – Kylie Minogue remix

1. Stateside + Kylie Minogue" – 2:48

Digital download/streaming – Zara Larsson remix

1. "Stateside + Zara Larsson" – 3:04

== Charts ==
2025 weekly chart performance for "Stateside"
Chart (2025)	Peak position
Ireland (IRMA)	56
New Zealand Hot Singles (RMNZ)	8
UK Singles (Official Charts)	45
US Hot Dance/Pop Songs (Billboard)	9

2026 weekly chart performance for "Stateside"
Chart (2026)	Peak position
Austria (Ö3 Austria Top 40)	10
Belgium (Ultratop 50 Wallonia)	6
Estonia Airplay (TopHit)	168
Finland Airplay (Radiosoittolista)	87
Germany (GfK)	8
India International (IMI)	15
Ireland (IRMA)	3
Latvia Airplay (TopHit)	165
Lithuania Airplay (TopHit)	67
Malaysia (IFPI)	10
Malaysia International (RIM)	4
Middle East and North Africa (IFPI)	2
Netherlands (Single Top 100)	11
New Zealand (Recorded Music NZ)	5
Norway Airplay (IFPI Norge)	21
Philippines (IFPI)	10
Portugal (AFP)	16
Saudi Arabia (IFPI)	2
Singapore (RIAS)	2
Switzerland (Schweizer Hitparade)	11
United Arab Emirates (IFPI)	2
UK Singles (OCC) (Note: The UK Singles Chart combines sales and streams from all versions of a song into one entry under the original track.)	3

== Certifications ==
Certifications
Region	Certification	Certified units/sales
Austria (IFPI Austria)	Gold	15,000^{‡}
Canada (Music Canada)	3× Platinum	240,000^{‡}
France (SNEP)	Gold	100,000^{‡}
New Zealand (RMNZ)	2× Platinum	60,000^{‡}
Portugal (AFP)	Platinum	25,000^{‡}
United Kingdom (BPI)	Platinum	600,000^{‡}
^{‡} Sales+streaming figures based on certification alone.

== Zara Larsson remix ==
"Stateside + Zara Larsson"

Single by PinkPantheress and Zara Larsson

from the album Fancy Some More?
- Released: 16 January 2026
- Recorded: September 2025
- Genre: Dance-pop; electropop; garage
- Length: 3:05
- Label: Warner
- Songwriters: PinkPantheress; Caroline Ailin; Harrison Patrick Smith; Karen Poole; MNEK; Zara Larsson
- Producers: PinkPantheress; Aksel Arvid; Glasear; Harrison Patrick Smith; Oscar Scheller

PinkPantheress singles chronology
"Starlight" (2025)	"Stateside + Zara Larsson" (2026)	"Girl Like Me" (2026)

Zara Larsson singles chronology
"Crush" (2025)	"Stateside + Zara Larsson" (2026)	"She Did It Again" (2026)

Music video
- "Stateside + Zara Larsson" on YouTube

A remix of "Stateside" featuring Swedish singer Zara Larsson, stylised as "Stateside + Zara Larsson", was released on 10 October 2025 as track ten from PinkPantheress' remix album Fancy Some More? (2025). It was released as a single on 24 September 2025, while the music video, directed by Charlotte Rutherford, was released on 15 January 2026. Commercially, the remix has reached the top ten in several countries, including Australia, Canada, Norway, Sweden, and the United States. On 21 February 2026, American figure skater Alysa Liu performed to the remix for her closing gala skate after winning a gold medal at the 2026 Winter Olympics, wearing an outfit inspired by PinkPantheress' dress in the video. Her performance went viral and received enthusiastic praise from PinkPantheress and Larsson on social media.

=== Background ===
In an interview with People magazine, Larsson commented on the recording process of her version of the remix, stating: "It was cute, boom boom boom boom boom, wrote my verse, sent it in, and then it was out like four days later". She further expressed that she "was afraid she was left off the final tracklist after seeing another version of the song with Kylie Minogue", stating: "I got really scared, like, 'Oh my God, what if she hated it? I thought she liked it", but that "it turned out she had, like, a million people on the remixes, which I think is actually a really fun way to do it". Larsson had written and recorded her verses for the song while opening for Tate McRae on her Miss Possessive Tour following the Denver date.

English songwriter and producer MNEK, a long-time collaborator of Larsson, co-wrote her verse for the remix. Larsson initially contacted MNEK while touring with Tate McRae on the Miss Possessive Tour, noting that PinkPantheress had asked her to contribute to the track. MNEK drafted and recorded a demo of the verse from his sofa using a laptop and a portable microphone. He incorporated specific references to Larsson's life and career into his draft; the line "who knew opening up would make me a headline" was inspired by online reactions to her tour, while "schedule ain't been loose for a minute" referenced her back-to-back touring schedule following the recording of her 2025 album Midnight Sun. Larsson subsequently reworked portions of the lyrics in the studio, altering the beginning and end of the verse to better reflect her personal style, while Larsson's recorded vocal riffs were influenced by MNEK's own singing style. Following the recording of Larsson's vocals to the original beat, PinkPantheress and producer Oscar Scheller reworked the track's production into its final version.

=== Composition and music video ===
"Stateside" has been described as a dance-pop, electropop, and garage track. A Charlotte Rutherford-directed music video for the remix was released on 15 January 2026, with PinkPantheress and Larsson acting as mannequins in store displays themed around their respective 2025 LP releases, Fancy That and Midnight Sun.

=== Accolades ===
Awards and nominations for "Stateside + Zara Larsson"
Year	Award	Category	Result	Ref.
2026	American Music Awards	Collaboration of the Year	Won	
2026	MTV Video Music Awards	Song of the Year	Nominated	
2026	MTV Video Music Awards	Best Collaboration	Nominated	
2026	MTV Video Music Awards	Best Dance	Nominated	
2026	MTV Video Music Awards	Best Art Direction	Won	
2026	MTV Video Music Awards	Best Visual Effects	Nominated	
2026	2026 UK Music Video Awards	Best Pop Video – UK	Nominated	
2026	2026 UK Music Video Awards	Best Styling in a Video	Nominated	

=== Commercial performance ===
In the United Kingdom, the remix of "Stateside" with Larsson helped the original track reach number three on the UK Singles Chart, while Larsson was credited on the UK Airplay Chart, where the song reached number 28. In the United States, "Stateside" reached number six on the US Billboard Hot 100, becoming the highest placement to date on the chart for Larsson, surpassing "Never Forget You" which peaked at number 13 in 2016. It is also the second top-ten for PinkPantheress after "Boy's a Liar Pt. 2" in 2023. On the Billboard Global 200, the remix reached number one, becoming the first track to top the chart for both artists. Following gold medalist figure skater Alysa Liu's performance to "Stateside" at the 2026 Winter Olympics, the song experienced a boost in popularity worldwide. It reached number one on the Spotify Global Daily Chart for the first time, with 5.64 million streams on 3 March 2026.

=== Charts ===
==== Weekly charts ====
2025 weekly chart performance for "Stateside"
Chart (2025)	Peak position
New Zealand Hot Singles (RMNZ)	12

2026 weekly chart performance for "Stateside"
Chart (2026)	Peak position
Australia (ARIA)	3
Austria Airplay (IFPI)	33
Brazil Hot 100 (Billboard)	62
Canada Hot 100 (Billboard)	6
Canada CHR/Top 40 (Billboard)	4
Canada Hot AC (Billboard)	34
Central America Anglo Airplay (Monitor Latino)	13
Colombia Anglo Airplay (Monitor Latino)	9
CIS Airplay (TopHit)	158
Costa Rica Anglo Airplay (Monitor Latino)	15
Croatia (Billboard)	9
Croatia International Airplay (Top lista)	11
Czech Republic Singles Digital (ČNS IFPI)	11
Denmark (Tracklisten)	20
Dominican Republic Anglo Airplay (Monitor Latino)	14
Estonia Airplay (TopHit)	21
Finland (Suomen virallinen lista)	13
France (SNEP)	28
Germany Airplay (BVMI)	39
Global 200 (Billboard)	1
Greece International (IFPI)	5
Guatemala Anglo Airplay (Monitor Latino)	9
Hong Kong (Billboard)	8
Hungary (Single Top 40)	26
Iceland (Billboard)	5
Israel (Mako Hitlist)	89
Italy (FIMI)	78
Latvia Airplay (LaIPA)	8
Latvia Streaming (LaIPA)	4
Lithuania (AGATA)	1
Luxembourg (Billboard)	14
Malaysia (Billboard)	4
Mexico Anglo Airplay (Monitor Latino)	8
Netherlands (Dutch Top 40)	19
Nicaragua Anglo Airplay (Monitor Latino)	2
Nigeria Bubbling Under Hot 100 (TurnTable)	1
Nigeria Airplay (TurnTable)	56
Norway (IFPI Norge)	7
Panama Streaming (PRODUCE)	113
Peru Anglo Airplay (Monitor Latino)	17
Philippines Hot 100 (Billboard Philippines)	10
Poland (Polish Streaming Top 100)	10
Puerto Rico Anglo Airplay (Monitor Latino)	12
Romania (Billboard)	4
Russia Airplay (TopHit)	164
Slovakia Airplay (ČNS IFPI)	36
Slovakia Singles Digital (ČNS IFPI)	4
Spain (Promusicae)	85
Sweden (Sverigetopplistan)	3
UK Airplay (Radiomonitor)	28
Uruguay Anglo Airplay (Monitor Latino)	11
US Billboard Hot 100	6
US Adult Pop Airplay (Billboard)	16
US Hot Dance/Pop Songs (Billboard)	1
US Pop Airplay (Billboard)	1
US Rhythmic Airplay (Billboard)	2
Vietnam Hot 100 (Billboard)	74

==== Monthly charts ====
Monthly chart performance
Chart (2026)	Peak position
Estonia Airplay (TopHit)	22
Panama Streaming (PRODUCE)	118

=== Certifications ===
Certifications
Region	Certification	Certified units/sales
Australia (ARIA)	2× Platinum	140,000^{‡}
Denmark (IFPI Danmark)	Gold	45,000^{‡}
Poland (ZPAV)	Gold	62,500^{‡}
Streaming
Greece (IFPI Greece)	Gold	1,000,000^{†}
Slovakia (ČNS IFPI)	Gold	850,000^{†}
^{‡} Sales+streaming figures based on certification alone.^{†} Streaming-only figures based on certification alone.

== Release history ==
"Stateside" release history
Region	Date	Format	Version	Label	Ref.
Various	25 April 2025	Digital download; streaming	Original	Warner	
Various	10 October 2025	Digital download; streaming	Stateside + Bladee	Warner	
Various	10 October 2025	Digital download; streaming	Stateside + Groove Armada	Warner	
Various	10 October 2025	Digital download; streaming	Stateside + Kylie Minogue	Warner	
Various	10 October 2025	Digital download; streaming	Stateside + Zara Larsson	Warner	
Italy	16 January 2026	Radio airplay	Stateside + Zara Larsson	Warner	
United States	10 February 2026	Contemporary hit radio	Original	Atlantic	
United States	3 March 2026	Contemporary hit radio	Stateside + Zara Larsson	Atlantic	
United States	24 March 2026	Rhythmic contemporary radio	Stateside + Zara Larsson	Atlantic	
