= Nice to Meet You (PinkPantheress song) =

2023 single by PinkPantheress featuring Central Cee

Single by PinkPantheress featuring Central Cee

from the album Heaven Knows
- Released: 10 November 2023
- Genre: Bedroom pop; 2-step garage
- Length: 2:42
- Label: Columbia; Parlophone
- Songwriters: Oakley Caesar-Su; Kim Hae-sol; Oh Hyuk; Gary James Kemp; Jeffrey Kim; Thomas Parker; Cashmere Small; Victoria Walker
- Producers: Cash Cobain; Count Baldor; PinkPantheress

PinkPantheress singles chronology
| "Capable of Love" (2023) | "Nice to Meet You" (2023) | "Turn It Up" (2024) |

Central Cee singles chronology
| "Too Much" (2023) | "Nice to Meet You" (2023) | "Entrapreneur" (2023) |

Music video
- "Nice to Meet You" on YouTube

"Nice to Meet You" is a song recorded by British singer-songwriter PinkPantheress featuring British rapper Central Cee. It was released on 10 November 2023 as the fourth and final single from PinkPantheress's debut studio album, Heaven Knows. The pop song, which was co-produced by American record producer Cash Cobain, is built around a sample of the 1983 Spandau Ballet song "Gold". It received mostly positive reviews from critics and peaked at number 20 on the UK Singles Chart. A music video featuring 2000s-inspired outfits and directed by Charlotte Rutherford was released alongside the single.

== Background and release ==
"Nice to Meet You" marked the first collaboration between British singer PinkPantheress and British rapper Central Cee, following Central Cee's song "Obsessed with You" sampling PinkPantheress's song "Just for Me" in 2021. The song was first teased on PinkPantheress's TikTok account in a behind-the-scenes clip from its music video announcing its release date. "Nice to Meet You" was included on PinkPantheress's debut studio album, Heaven Knows, which was released on 10 November 2023. "Nice to Meet You" was released through Columbia Records and Parlophone Records. It was later included on the compilation album Now That's What I Call Music! 117.

The song was the focus of an Apple Music advertisement starring PinkPantheress and American record producer Cash Cobain, one of the song's co-producers, in which they showed how they produced the song using a MacBook Pro.

== Production and composition ==
"Nice to Meet You" is an energetic pop song that was produced by PinkPantheress with Cobain using the digital audio workstations GarageBand, Logic Pro, where PinkPantheress wrote the vocal melody in the "piano roll" before singing it, and FL Studio, which Cobain used to arrange the song's drums. It was the first collaboration between PinkPantheress and Cobain. It is built around a looped instrumental sample of the intro from Spandau Ballet's 1983 song "Gold", interpolates the Zion.T song "Sleep Talk" featuring Oh Hyuk, and its production includes a Jersey club-inspired kick drum pattern, "rumbling" bass, tabla, and breakbeats. PinkPantheress only sings one verse on the song and stated in a video about its production that it was because second verses are "ridiculous". The song's lyrics show PinkPantheress expressing her admiration for a lover. Clash's Amrit Virdi described PinkPantheress's lyrics as an analysis of the "influencer dynamic". Central Cee raps on the song about cheating on and breaking up with a significant other who made storytime videos about their breakup.

== Critical reception ==
Amrit Virdi of Clash praised "Nice to Meet You" as "one of my favorite tracks on [Heaven Knows]" and praised Central Cee's verse on the song for being "more pared-back than his solo releases" and for "fit[ting] into PinkPantheress' distinctive sound, and mak[ing] a unique stamp when doing so". Paul Meara of BET called "Nice to Meet You" a "standout" of Heaven Knows, while Notion's Kitty Robson called it a "must-listen" from the album. For NME, Alex Rigotti reviewed "Nice to Meet You" positively, writing that PinkPantheress had "effortless charisma" on the "starry" song, which had "one of the best choruses on Heaven Knows", but that Central Cee's "monotone delivery" felt "mismatched and lacklustre".

Slant's Charles Lyons-Burt wrote that the song suffered from its "melodramatic fatalism", which, he opined, felt "unearned". For Resident Advisor, Andrew Ryce wrote that "Nice to Meet You" felt to him "like a missed opportunity". For the Ball State Daily News, Adjwou Mesgana Waiss described the song as "dance-challenge bait" and criticized Central Cee's verse on the song as "predictable", comparing its atmosphere unfavorably to that of PinkPantheress's 2021 song "Just for Me".

== Music video ==
The 2000s-inspired music video for "Nice to Meet You" was directed by British director Charlotte Rutherford, choreographed by Seun Latukolan, and released on the same day as the single. PinkPantheress wears two outfits in the video, both of which were also inspired by the fashion of the 2000s and styled by her stylist Milena Agbaba: one features denim pedal pushers, a black camisole, and suede boots, while the other consists of a shrug, a knitted dress, and boots. Central Cee also appears in two different outfits, a black tracksuit with trainers and a beanie and a green hoodie with green sweatpants. The video shows PinkPantheress singing in front of a crew of backup dancers dressed in baggy clothing and a white backdrop as colorful shapes and splotches appear onscreen and a paper plane with a love letter inside of it flies over London.

== Charts ==
Weekly chart performance for "Nice to Meet You"
| Chart (2023–2024) | Peak position |
|---|---|
| Ireland (IRMA) | 34 |
| UK Singles (Official Charts) | 20 |
| US Rhythmic Airplay (Billboard) | 30 |
