= PinkPantheress =

British singer-songwriter and producer (born 2001)

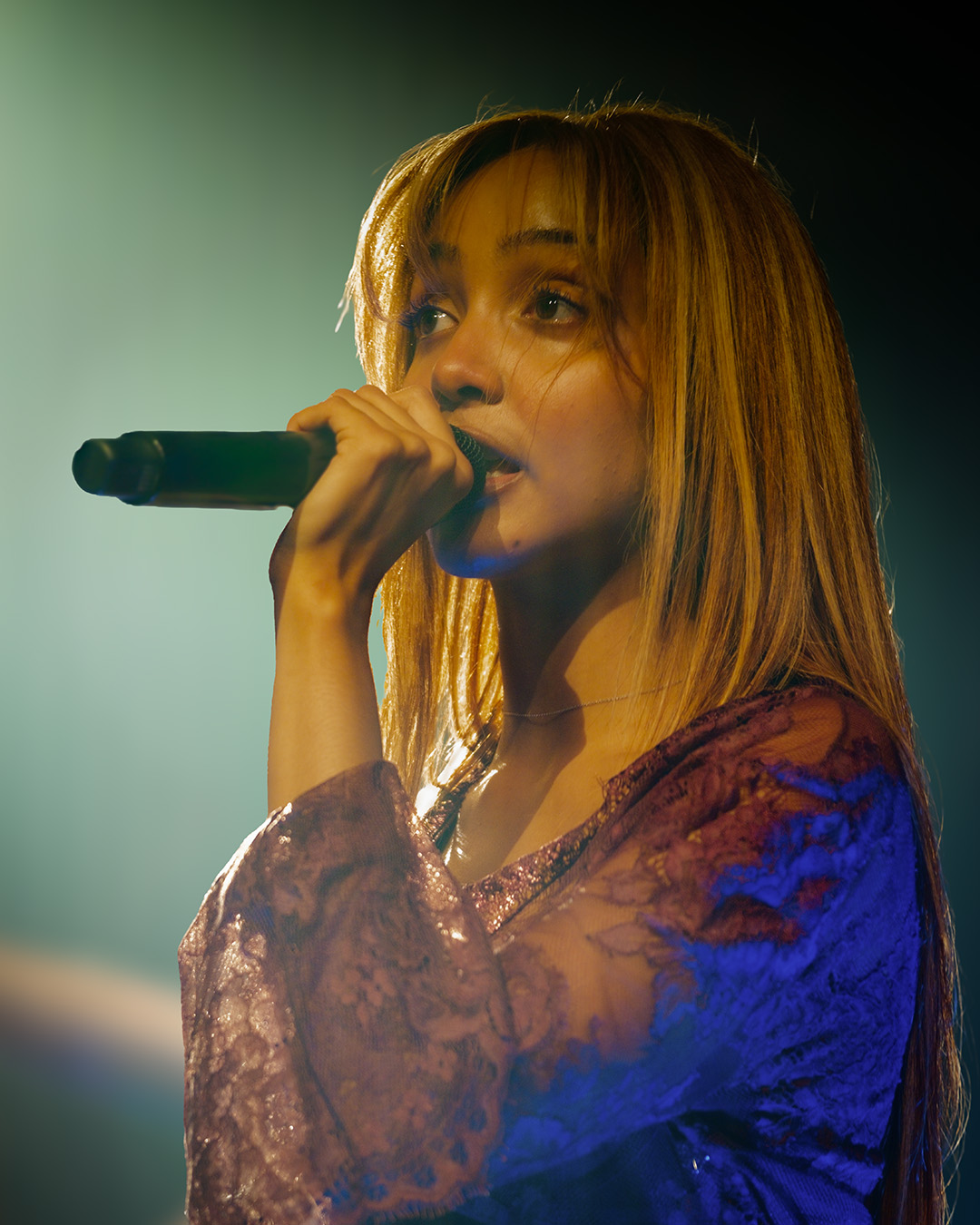
- PinkPantheress in 2026
- Born: Victoria Beverley Walker; 19 April 2001 (age 25); Bath, Somerset, England
- Education: University of the Arts London (dropped out)
- Occupations: Singer-songwriter; record producer
- Years active: 2019–present
- Works: Discography
- Family: Susan Lalic (aunt)
- Awards: Full list
- Musical career
- Origin: Canterbury, Kent, England
- Genres: Dance-pop; UK garage; drum and bass; alt-pop; R&B
- Labels: Parlophone; Elektra; Warner UK; 300
- Website: pantheress.pink

Victoria Beverley Walker (born 19 April 2001), known professionally as PinkPantheress, is a British singer-songwriter and record producer. She has been nominated for over forty accolades, making history as the youngest person and first woman to be awarded a Brit Award for British Producer of the Year. Her music blends styles such as R&B, drum and bass, UK garage, house, and alternative pop, often sampling music from the 1990s and 2000s and featuring affable stream-of-consciousness lyrics.

Born in Bath, Somerset, and raised in Kent, PinkPantheress began her musical career in 2021 while attending university in London, where she produced songs using GarageBand and posted them on SoundCloud and TikTok. Several songs, including "Break It Off", became popular on TikTok, and she signed to Parlophone and Elektra Records and released her debut mixtape To Hell with It later that year. Her 2022 singles "Just for Me" and "Pain" peaked in the top 40 of the UK Singles Chart, and "Boy's a Liar" reached number two.

PinkPantheress's debut studio album, Heaven Knows (2023), charted in ten countries. It spawned the UK top-20 song "Nice to Meet You" and the remix single "Boy's a Liar Pt. 2" (with Ice Spice), which peaked at number three on the US Billboard Hot 100. She continued this success with her second mixtape, Fancy That (2025), which reached number three on the UK Albums Chart. It spawned the UK top-40 singles "Tonight" and "Stateside", and "Illegal" became her second entry in the US. The remix single "Stateside + Zara Larsson" (with Zara Larsson) became her second top-ten hit in the US and her first to top the Billboard Global 200.

== Early life and education ==
Victoria Beverley Walker was born on 19 April 2001 in Bath, Somerset, to a Luo mother from Kisumu, Kenya, who works as a carer, and an English father, a statistics professor. She has a brother who works as an audio engineer. Walker is the niece of English chess player Susan Lalic. Walker has said that her "family are all chess players", and that if she was not making music she would "be a chess player". When she was five years old, her family moved from Bath to Canterbury, Kent, where she grew up and studied at Simon Langton Girls' School. Her father moved to the U.S. to work at the University of Texas in Austin, Texas, when she was 12 years old, but she and her mother remained in the UK.

Walker took piano lessons as a child, and, at age 12, sang "Stand by Me" by Ben E. King at a school talent show. When she was 14 years old, she became the lead singer in a rock band, which covered songs by My Chemical Romance, Paramore, and Green Day, and performed with them for the first time at a school fête. She studied film at the University of the Arts London, but dropped out in 2022. In July 2025, she received an honorary doctorate in Music from the University of Kent.

== Career ==
=== 2019–2021: To Hell with It ===
Walker started writing music in secondary school to help a friend before eventually writing music on her own. At age 17, she began using GarageBand to produce instrumentals for a friend, and she later used GarageBand to record many of her early songs while lying down in her university hall late at night. She started uploading original songs of hers to SoundCloud as PinkPantheress. After a video posted to her personal TikTok account in December 2020 received over 500 thousand likes, she posted a snippet of her song "Just a Waste", which used the instrumental from Michael Jackson's song "Off the Wall", as PinkPantheress later that month in the hopes of reaching a wider audience; the snippet soon went viral on the platform.

Two of PinkPantheress's songs, the Adam F-sampling "Break It Off" and the Sweet Female Attitude-sampling "Pain", went viral on TikTok in early 2021, with the latter peaking at number 35 on the UK Singles Chart in August of that year. She was signed to Parlophone in April 2021. In June 2021, she was featured on GoldLink's song "Evian" from his studio album Haram! and signed to Elektra Records. When a snippet of her song "Just for Me", produced by Mura Masa, gained attention on TikTok, she released it in August 2021, along with a music video co-directed by her and released the following month. On the UK Singles Chart, it peaked at number 27, making it her highest entry on the UK Singles Chart at the time. It earned PinkPantheress nominations for an iHeartRadio Music Award, an Ivor Novello Award, and two NME Awards. At the time, Walker coined the genre and term "New Nostalgia" as a way to describe her sound. According to Office Magazine, the term denotes "a trend wistful of the Y2K era" and was often associated with PinkPantheress.

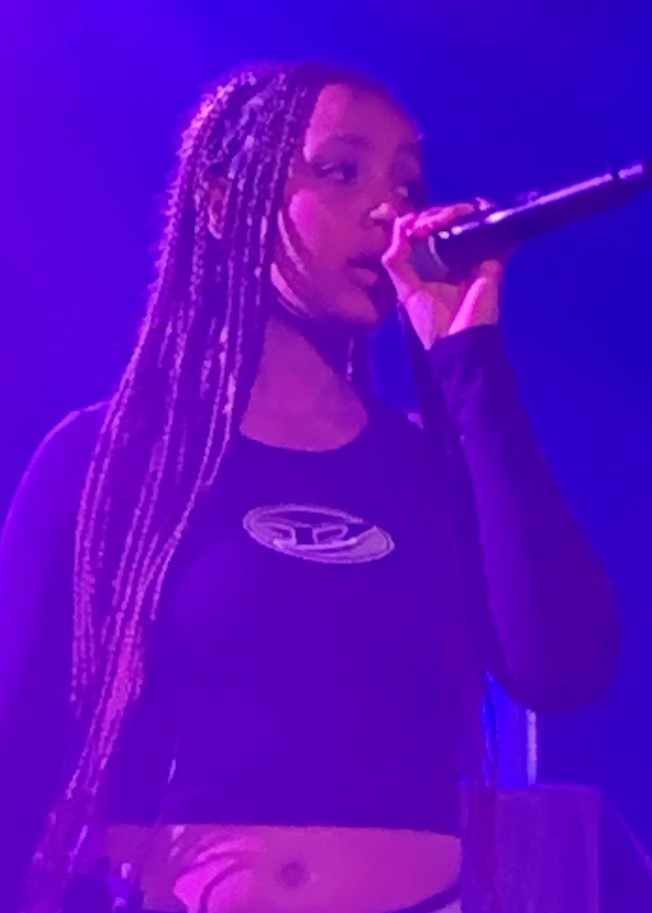
PinkPantheress performing at (Le) Poisson Rouge in 2022

In early October 2021, PinkPantheress announced the release date and title of her debut mixtape, To Hell with It, which was released on 15 October 2021 through Parlophone and Elektra Records and debuted at number 20 on the UK Albums Chart. The mixtape was preceded by "Pain", "Break It Off", and "Just for Me" as singles, as well as "Passion", released in July 2021, and "I Must Apologise", released in October 2021. PinkPantheress performed live for the first time in October and November 2021 in London.

=== 2022–2024: Heaven Knows ===
In January 2022, PinkPantheress was announced as the winner of BBC's Sound of 2022 poll. That same month, she released a remix album for To Hell with It. She was nominated for the Brit Award for Song of the Year at the 42nd Brit Awards for "Obsessed With You" by Central Cee, which sampled her song "Just for Me", and gave a virtual performance on Roblox for the Brit Awards. She appeared on the song "Bbycakes" with Mura Masa, Lil Uzi Vert, and Shygirl in February 2022. She released her song "Where You Are" featuring Willow in April 2022. That same month, PinkPantheress went on a European tour in support of To Hell with It. She was featured on "Tinkerbell is Overrated", a song from Beabadoobee's second album, Beatopia, released in July 2022. She performed as an opening act on Halsey's Love and Power Tour throughout the spring of 2022 on the American leg. In June 2022, she cancelled her scheduled appearance at the Primavera Sound festival in Barcelona due to hearing loss. Her next single, "Picture in My Mind", featuring Sam Gellaitry was released in August 2022. Her extended play Take Me Home was released in December 2022, featuring the singles "Boy's a Liar" and "Do You Miss Me", both released a month prior, and the title track.

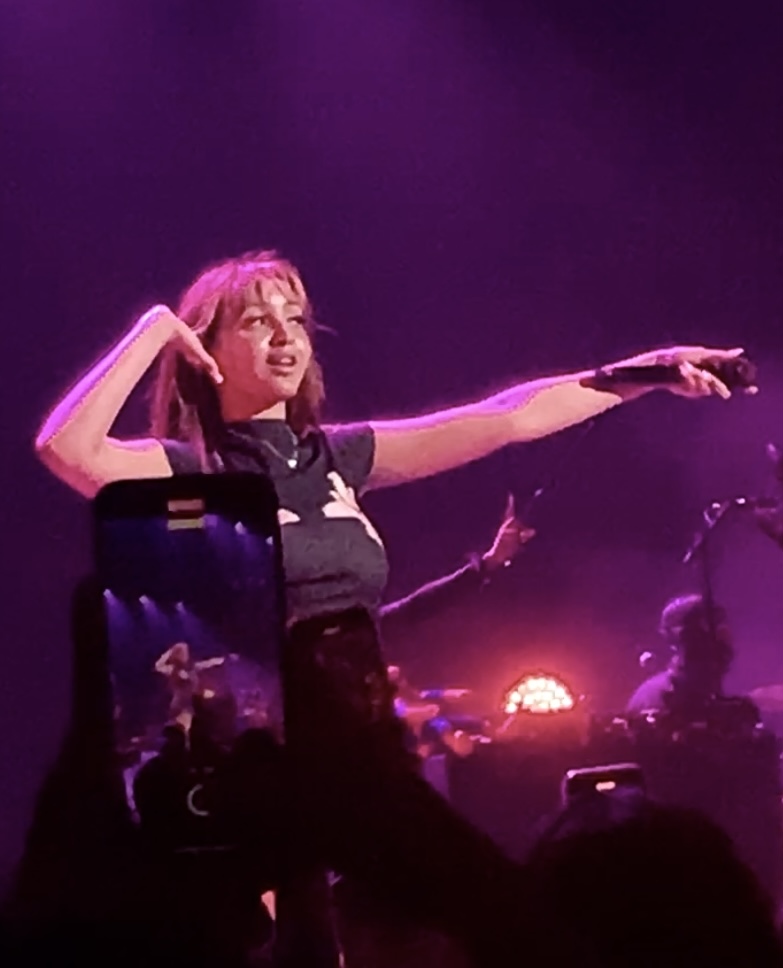
PinkPantheress performing on the Capable of Love Tour in 2024

"Way Back", her collaborative single with Skrillex and Trippie Redd, was released in January 2023 and included on Skrillex's album Don't Get Too Close the following month. In February 2023, she released a remix of "Boy's a Liar", "Boy's a Liar Pt. 2", with American rapper Ice Spice. After becoming popular on TikTok, the remix debuted at number 14 on the Billboard Hot 100, becoming her first song to appear on the chart, and later peaked at number three. It also peaked at number two on the UK Singles Chart, where it became her highest-charting single. It was certified platinum by the Recording Industry Association of America (RIAA), marking her first RIAA certification, and was nominated for two BET Awards, an MTV EMA, and a Streamy Award. "Angel", her addition to the soundtrack for the Greta Gerwig–directed 2023 film Barbie, was released as a single in June 2023. Her collaborative single "Turn Your Phone Off" with Destroy Lonely was released in July 2023, and she was featured alongside Hyunjin of the K-pop group Stray Kids on a remix of the Troye Sivan song "Rush" in August 2023. In October 2023, PinkPantheress announced her debut album, Heaven Knows, which was released on 10 November 2023. "Mosquito", the album's lead single, was released in September, followed by the singles "Capable of Love" and "Nice to Meet You" in October and November, respectively.

In October 2023, PinkPantheress announced the Capable of Love Tour for the UK and Europe, spanning from February to April 2024, with North American dates added later in November. The North American leg was produced by Live Nation. In February 2024, she was honoured as Producer of the Year by Billboard Women in Music. She performed as an opener on Olivia Rodrigo's Guts World Tour in the summer of 2024 until announcing the cancellation of all of her remaining live performances in August of that year, citing health reasons. She was featured on a remix of K-pop group Le Sserafim's song "Crazy" released in September 2024. In December 2024, PinkPantheress made a guest appearance at American rapper Nettspend's stop at Los Angeles during his Bad Ass F*cking Kid tour.

=== 2025–present: Fancy That and second album ===
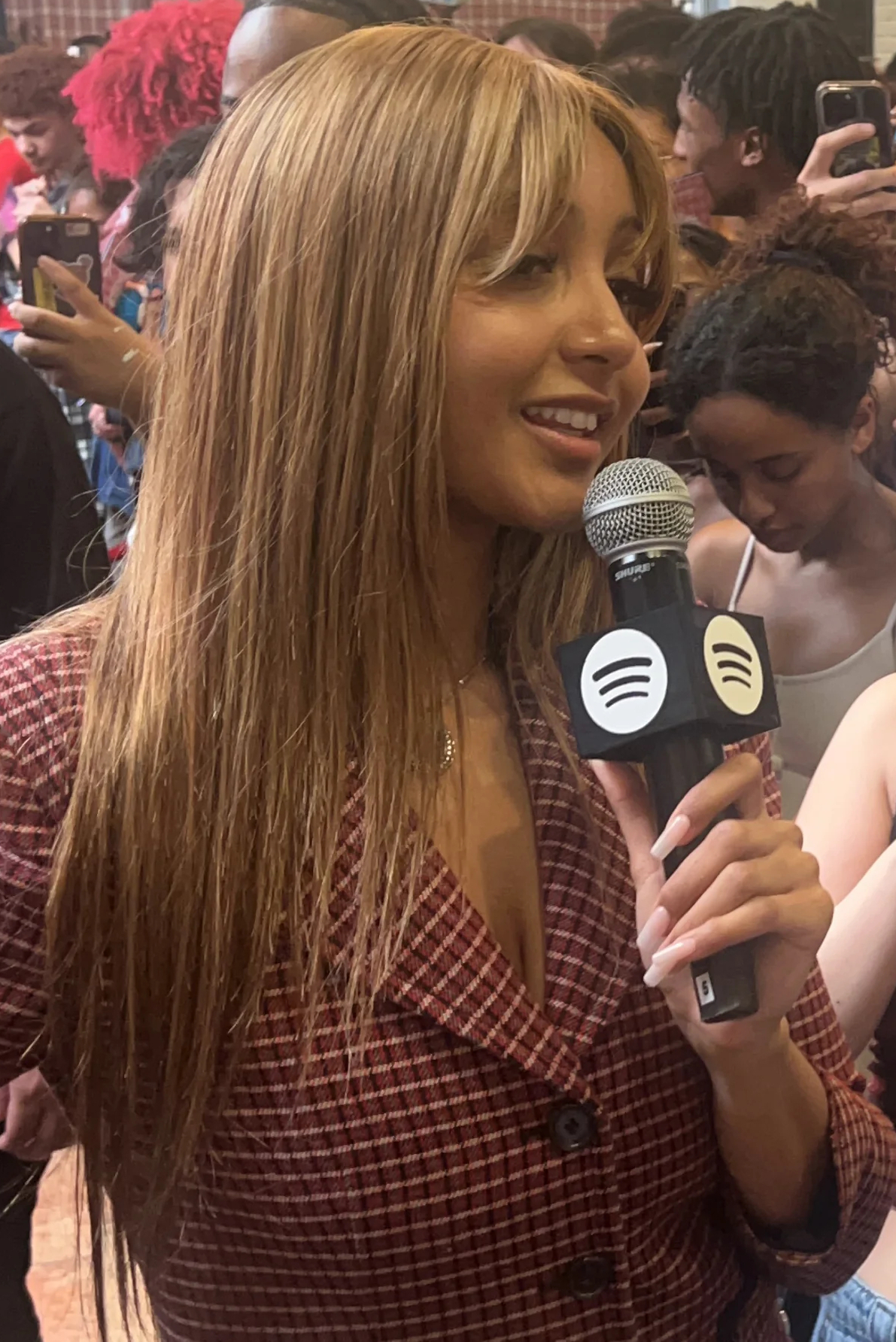
PinkPantheress at the Spotify Awards in 2025

In January 2025, PinkPantheress was featured on Shygirl's single "True Religion" alongside Isabella Lovestory. Her first solo single of 2025, "Tonight", was released in April with a Regency–inspired music video. Her second mixtape, Fancy That, was released on 9 May 2025, with "Tonight" as its lead single. She was featured on Danny L Harle's song "Starlight", released in July 2025, and was featured on Yves's single "Soap", which was released in August 2025. On 10 October 2025, she released the remix mixtape Fancy Some More?, which features several artists. In November 2025, she received a nomination for the Grammy Award for Best Dance Pop Recording for "Illegal" and Best Dance Electronic Album for Fancy That. That same month, she appeared on Benee's second album Ur an Angel I'm Just Particles as a "secret feature" on "Princess", which she also helped write. She appeared on the FKA Twigs song "Wild and Alone" from her album Eusexua Afterglow, which was released in November 2025.

In February 2026, PinkPantheress appeared as a contestant on an episode of The Weakest Link. She was voted off in the sixth round. Later that month, she won the Brit Award for British Producer of the Year, making her the youngest artist and the first woman to receive the award. In July 2026, PinkPantheress was announced to make her acting debut in a feature film directed by the director duo Daniels. She would join the cast alongside Matt Damon and Sandra Oh. In August 2026, PinkPantheress uploaded a video to TikTok where she performed the tour choreography to her song "Girl Like Me" and confirmed in the caption that her second studio album was being released. She told fans that they should "start saying [their] goodbyes [to the Fancy That 'era']". In November 2026, it was revealed that PinkPantheress voiced Victoria, the co-host of the Stockbridge FM radio station, in Grand Theft Auto VI. Subsequently, her song "Sexy Magic" with Ca7riel & Paco Amoroso, Fred Again, and Étienne de Crécy, was featured as the fifth track on the Grand Theft Auto VI: The Album soundtrack.

== Artistry ==
=== Influences ===
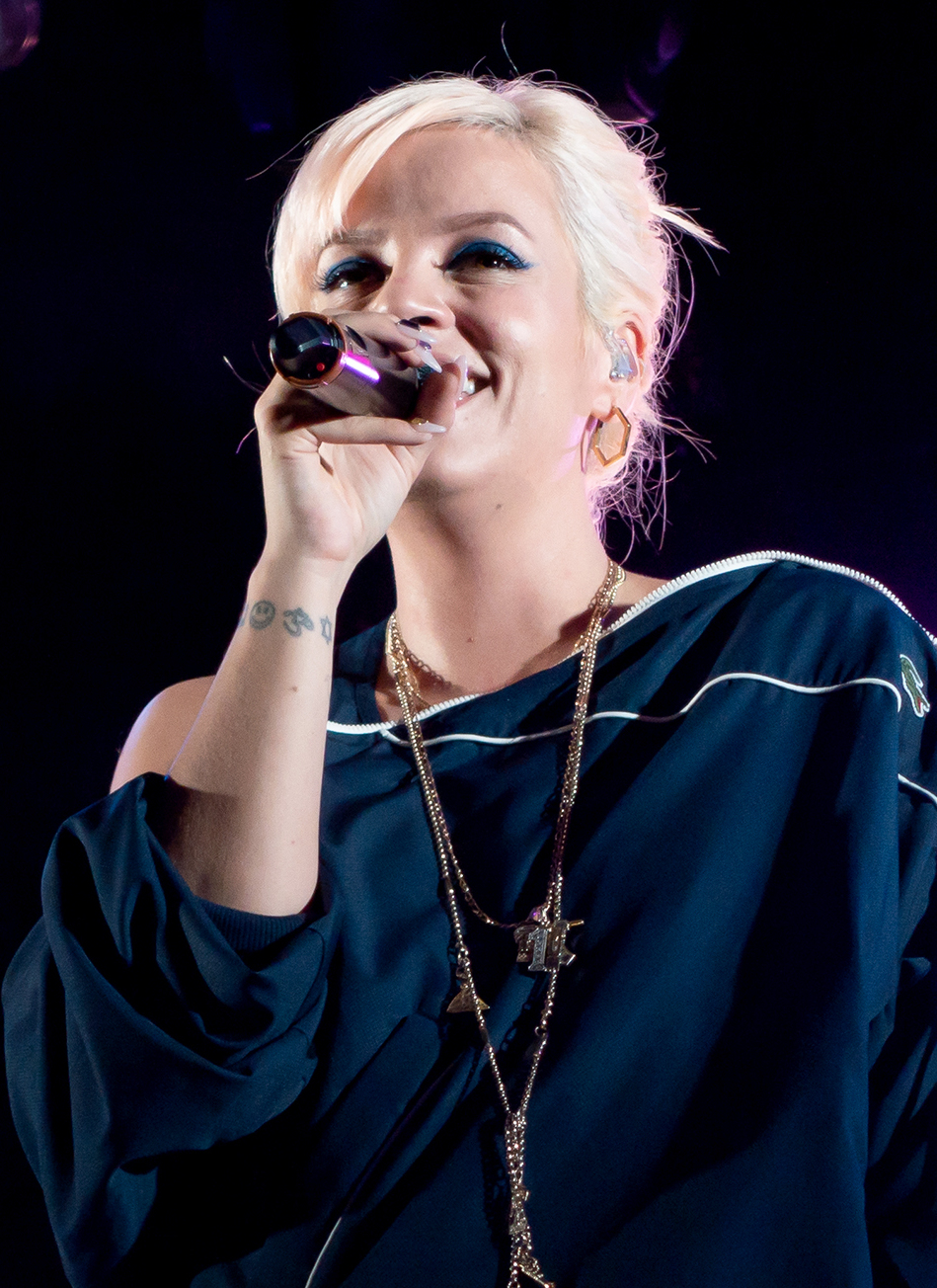
Lily Allen (left) and Hayley Williams (right) were two of PinkPantheress's biggest inspirations growing up.

PinkPantheress's stage name was taken from her TikTok account of the same name, which was inspired by a question from the game show The Chase that asked "What is a female panther called?" and by The Pink Panther film series. PinkPantheress has listed Imogen Heap, Lily Allen, Kelela, and Kate Nash as her biggest influences, alongside other artists such as My Chemical Romance, Just Jack, Michael Jackson, Kaytranada and Frank Ocean. She has also cited K-pop songs, Blink-182, Good Charlotte, Green Day, early Panic! at the Disco, Linkin Park, and Frou Frou as inspirations for her melodies and beat choices. She has called Hayley Williams a "big influence" on her as a performer and said that she first wanted to become a professional musician when she was 14 years old after seeing Williams perform as part of Paramore during Reading Festival and that she is "doing music because of [Williams]". She has also stated that she was inspired by an interview with Doja Cat to pursue music as a career, and was inspired to post her songs on TikTok by Lil Nas X.

=== Musical style ===
PinkPantheress's music has been described as bedroom pop, pop, dance, R&B, alt-pop, drum and bass, 2-step, jungle, and hyperpop, and often uses samples of other songs, such as dance music from the 1990s and 2000s and jungle, funk, UK garage, and pop songs. PinkPantheress uses topline writing to write her songs, which are frequently self-produced and short in length. She has attributed the shorter length of her songs, which customarily range from two to three minutes long, to her belief that a song does not need to be longer than two minutes and thirty seconds or to have a bridge, a repeated verse, or an extended outro. She has described her own music as alt-pop and "a form of D'n'B that's acceptable to listen to at home", and has stated that she writes "sadder", "dark" lyrics to "appeal to the youth", often to contrast them with her "happy instrumentals". PinkPantheress has said that her lyrics are usually not based on personal experiences, stating, "A lot of it just comes because I really like storytelling." Her views on music, including on song lengths and her stating that she does not listen to albums in full, have prompted criticism and discussion on social media.

NPR's Vanessa Handy called breakbeat loops a "signature of [PinkPantheress's] work", while music critic Kieran Press-Reynolds, writing for Insider stated that her songs regularly have "fast-paced breakbeats" and "ASMR-like refrains". Rolling Stone's Keegan Brady described PinkPantheress's music as "alt-girl rap" and wrote that she uses "confessional, almost treacly rap-singing" and "dated production technology" in her songs which "tap[s] into a deeply nostalgic sound that conjures the height of Nineties U.K. culture". DIY's Georgia Evans called her "DIY aesthetic that started as GarageBand experimentation" a signature of her music.

PinkPantheress is a soprano. The Guardian's Michael Cragg described her vocals as "sweet but unsettling", while Jon Caramanica of The New York Times wrote that she "sounds like she's flirting and aching all at once." Cat Zhang of Pitchfork called PinkPantheress's voice "angelic", "girlish", and "slight" and wrote that she was "one of the rare TikTok artists whose internet fame seems proportional to their potential". Felicity Martin of Dazed called her lyrics "sad" and "wistful". Steffanee Wang of Nylon called her music "a collage of sounds that fell [sic] simultaneously dated and contemporary", adding that listening to it "feels like being on the internet before social media was a thing". Insider's Kieran Press-Reynolds wrote that PinkPantheress gave up-tempo electronic music genres like drum and bass an "introspective, romantic bedroom sound" with her "hushed" vocals.

PinkPantheress told The Hollywood Reporter that she wants to be taken more seriously in the music industry. She said that she believes "people are less willing to listen to electronic music that is made by a Black woman". She acknowledged the influence of her British heritage on her music, saying "Every time I’ve tried to lean into a more American sound, it ends up being a song that I don’t necessarily think reflects my personal tastes as much as when I lean into being British."

=== Performance ===
In her early career, PinkPantheress would walk onto the stage at live shows with a purse in hand in order to make her feel comfortable performing and counter stage fright.

== Personal life ==
PinkPantheress has discussed experiencing body dysmorphia from a young age. She also has hearing loss, which initially began as tinnitus, from exposure to loud microphone feedback. She reported being 80% deaf in her right ear in 2022 and has described voices as sounding "mostly like bass". PinkPantheress has spoken about her struggles with OCD. She has been diagnosed with primarily obsessional obsessive–compulsive disorder.

== Discography ==
- Heaven Knows (2023)

== Tours ==
Headlining

- To Hell with It Tour (2022–2023)
- The Capable of Love Tour (2024)
- An Evening With... PinkPantheress (2025–2026)

Supporting

- Halsey – Love and Power Tour (2022)
- Olivia Rodrigo – Guts World Tour (2024)
