= Illegal (PinkPantheress song) =

Single by PinkPantheress

from the album Fancy That
- Released: 6 June 2025
- Genre: 2-step garage; dance-pop
- Length: 2:30
- Label: Warner
- Songwriters: PinkPantheress; Karl Hyde; Rick Smith; Darren Emerson
- Producers: Aksel Arvid; PinkPantheress

PinkPantheress singles chronology
"Stateside" (2025)	"Illegal" (2025)	"Close to You" (2025)

Music video
- "Illegal" on YouTube

"Illegal" is a song by British singer-songwriter and record producer PinkPantheress. It was released on 6 June 2025 through Warner Records as the third single from her second mixtape Fancy That. The song samples "Dark & Long (Dark Train)" by Underworld. That same year, it became a popular trend on TikTok, where the song is played with two people shaking hands, with alternating points of view being shown.. The song is featured in the official radio soundtrack of Grand Theft Auto VI.

== Background and release ==
‘Illegal’ feels like coming home, it’s garage, gritty, and takes me right back to where I started with music. I’ve always loved that raw, late-night energy, and sampling Underworld felt like the perfect way to tap into that spirit while making it my own.

— PinkPantheress, Uproxx

On 17 March 2025, PinkPantheress posted a video on TikTok showcasing a snippet of the song with the caption: "Vetting my boyfriend to become a proffecient filmer [sic] for these occasions." The song was later teased on 28 March 2025, on The Lot Radio, during PinkPantheress' DJ set.

Shortly after the release of Fancy That, PinkPantheress spoke with Capital FM interviewer Sam Prance about the meanings of the different songs on the mixtape. She explained that many fans (and the interviewer) thought it was about love before going on to explain it was about drugs. The song was originally going to revolve around using a male escort, but PinkPantheress had never gone through that type of situation, so she instead made it about buying weed.

In October 2025, two additional versions of "Illegal" were released as part of the remix album Fancy Some More?; one featuring Seventeen members Mingyu, Vernon and The8, and another featuring Anitta. A Nia Archives remix was released on the second disc of the album.

The song received a nomination for the Grammy Award for Best Dance Pop Recording at the 68th Grammy Awards.

On 27 February 2026, a Four Tet remix was released on streaming services.

== Music video ==
The music video for "Illegal", directed by Ethan & Tom, was released on 9 May 2025, the same day as the song's release. The video stars Sekou Diaby.

The video showcases the negative consequences of drugs. It begins with PinkPantheress singing whilst inquiring about drugs sold by a man. The man takes one, causing the video to transition into what appears to be a series of hallucinations featuring Pink dancing against colourful backgrounds, as well as animated segments of her running. Whilst experiencing this, the man and Pink lie on a bed. Eventually, the man wakes up, with the drug's effect seemingly wearing off.

== Track listing ==
Digital download/streaming

1. "Illegal" – 2:29

Digital download/streaming

1. "Illegal" (Nia Archives remix) – 2:40

== Charts ==
=== Weekly charts ===
Weekly chart performance for "Illegal"
Chart (2025)	Peak position
Australia (ARIA)	42
Canada Hot 100 (Billboard)	73
Global 200 (Billboard)	109
Greece International (IFPI)	75
Ireland (IRMA)	37
Lithuania (AGATA)	71
Malta Airplay (Radiomonitor)	2
Netherlands (Single Tip)	2
New Zealand (Recorded Music NZ)	32
UK Singles (Official Charts)	22
US Billboard Hot 100	96
US Hot Dance/Pop Songs (Billboard)	5

=== Year-end charts ===
Year-end chart performance for "Illegal"
Chart (2025)	Position
US Hot Dance/Pop Songs (Billboard)	11

== Certifications ==
Certifications for "Illegal"
Region	Certification	Certified units/sales
Australia (ARIA)	Gold	35,000^{‡}
New Zealand (RMNZ)	Gold	15,000^{‡}
United Kingdom (BPI)	Gold	400,000^{‡}
^{‡} Sales+streaming figures based on certification alone.
