= All Points East =

Annual music festival in Victoria Park, London, England

Coordinates: 51.538°N 0.033°W

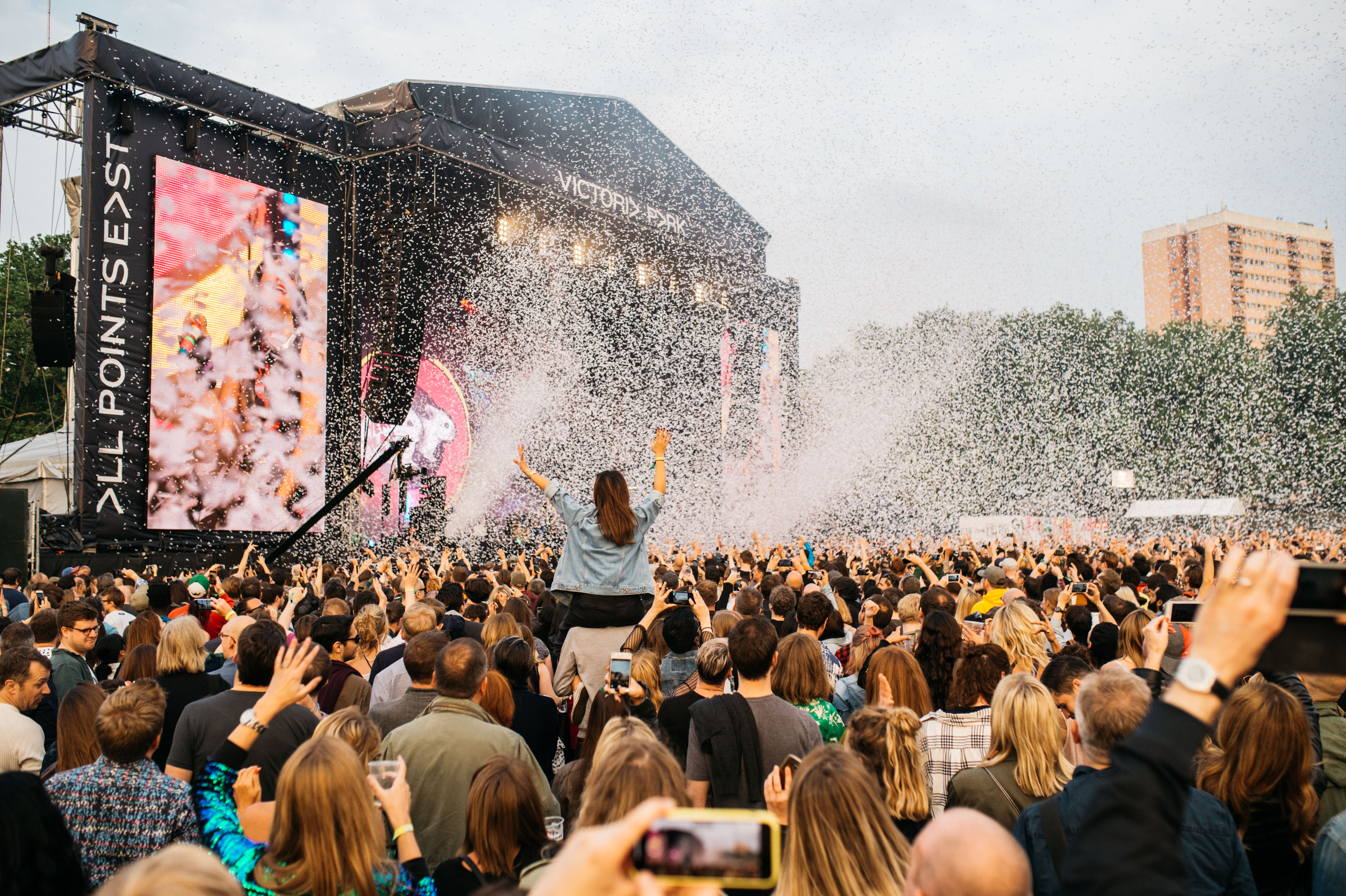
- Yeah Yeah Yeahs performing at All Points East Festival 2018
- Venue: Victoria Park, London, England
- Years active: 2018-present
- Attendance: 40,000
- Organiser: AEG Presents
- Website: allpointseastfestival.com

All Points East is an annual music festival held over two weekends in August in London's Victoria Park. The event is managed by AEG Presents. The 10-day event comprises one festival weekend, four days of free entry and community activities known as "In the Neighbourhood", and three standalone headline shows in its APE Presents series.

== History ==
All Points East's inaugural show was held in August 2018, with LCD Soundsystem, The xx, and Björk headlining the festival weekend while Catfish and the Bottlemen, The National, and Nick Cave headlined the following weekend's three standalone shows. The festival was a success, and All Points East won the award for Line-Up of the Year at the UK Festival Awards that December.

On 6 November 2018, it was announced that The Chemical Brothers would headline the first day of All Points East 2019, alongside Hot Chip, Primal Scream, and Spiritualized. It was then announced that Bon Iver would close the festival. The other four headliners for 2019 were The Strokes, Christine and the Queens, Bring Me the Horizon and Mumford and Sons. In May 2019, All Points East won the award for Best Festival at the Music Week Awards 2019. Capacity at the 2019 festival was stated as 40,000.

Beginning in 2021, Field Day was presented under the All Points East banner. Starting in 2026, Outbreak Festival London is also being presented under All Points East in place of Field Day.

The festival has historically dealt with some conflict. The COVID-19 pandemic resulted in the cancellation of the 2020 festival. Local residents have expressed dissatisfaction at the festival closing off large parts of Victoria Park during the summer.

The 2026 festival included a headline performance by Lorde at Victoria Park. The performance was part of her Ultrasound tour and was her first appearance at All Points East since she played a smaller stage at the festival in 2018.

== Festival lineups ==
=== 2018 ===
Weekend 1
Friday 25 May	Saturday 26 May	Sunday 27 May
LCD Soundsystem; Yeah Yeah Yeahs; Phoenix; Glass Animals; Richie Hawtin; Dixon; Nick Murphy fka Chet Faker; Chromeo; Young Fathers; George FitzGerald; Hercules & Love Affair; Roman Flügel; DJ Tennis; Gerd Janson; Superorganism	The xx; Lorde; Justice; Sampha; Soulwax; Lykke Li; Popcaan; BADBADNOTGOOD; Rhye; Stefflon Don; Rex Orange County; Omar-S; Hunee; Lisa Hannigan	Björk; Beck; Father John Misty; Friendly Fires; Tom Misch; Flying Lotus; The Black Madonna, Django Django; Kelela; Mashrou' Leila; Sylvan Esso; Khruangbin

Weekend 2
Friday 1 June	Saturday 2 June	Sunday 3 June
Catfish and the Bottlemen; The Hunna; Blossoms; Frank Carter & The Rattlesnakes; The Neighbourhood; The Amazons; The Magic Gang; Spring King; The Big Moon; Superfood	The National; The War on Drugs; Future Islands; Warpaint; Cat Power; Public Service Broadcasting; Broken Social Scene; Spoon; Amber Run	Nick Cave and the Bad Seeds; Patti Smith; St. Vincent; Courtney Barnett; The Psychedelic Furs; The Black Lips; Baxter Dury; Nadine Shah; Shame; Bo Ningen

=== 2019 ===
Weekend 1
Friday 24 May	Saturday 25 May	Sunday 26 May
The Chemical Brothers; Hot Chip; Primal Scream; Jon Hopkins; Spiritualized; Little Dragon; Peggy Gou; Róisín Murphy; Danny Brown; David August; Lane 8; Little Simz; Jadu Heart; Optimo; Ibibio Sound Machine; Petite Noir; Maurice Fulton; Josey Rebelle; Ge-ology; DMX Krew; Gold Panda; Gabe Gurnsey; Zdot Sound System; Zapatilla; 2Fox; Dirty Freud; Nick Williams; Kelvyn Colt; Yota; Louis VI; Alice D	The Strokes; The Raconteurs; Interpol; Johnny Marr; Fat White Family; Parquet Courts; Jarvis Cocker; Courtney Barnett; Connan Mockasin; Anna Calvi; Bakar; The Nude Party; Viagra Boys; Gruff Rhys; Psychedelic Porn Crumpets; Miya Folick; Pregoblin; Billy Nomates; Balcony; Valeras; Naked Elephant; Vista Kicks	Christine and the Queens; James Blake; Metronomy; Maribou State; Kamasi Washington; Beach House; Honne; Kurt Vile and the Violators; Princess Nokia; Toro y Moi; Ezra Collective; Baloji; Rina Sawayama; Bob Moses; Andrew Weatherall; Yves Tumor; Joy Orbison; Cuco; Moxie; Mild Orange; Octo Octa; Galcher Lustwerk; Paquita Gordon; Romare; Self Esteem; Sian Anderson; Cola Boyy; Madison McFerrin; Retiree; Tsha; Deep Deep Water; 8 Bit Society; Lava La Rue; Kaiit; Lou Doillon; John Nicholas

Weekend 2
Friday 31 May	Saturday 1 June	Sunday 2 June
Bring Me the Horizon; Run the Jewels; Architects; Nothing But Thieves; Idles; While She Sleeps; Employed to Serve; Alice Glass; Scarlxrd; Yonaka	Mumford & Sons; Leon Bridges; Dizzee Rascal; The Vaccines; Dermot Kennedy; Sam Fender; Jade Bird; Gretta Ray; Dizzy	Bon Iver; Mac DeMarco; First Aid Kit; John Grant; The Tallest Man on Earth; Julien Baker; Snail Mail; Kokoko!

=== 2020 ===
The 2020 festival was cancelled due to the COVID-19 pandemic. Before the cancellation, the announced lineup was:

Weekend 1
Friday 22 May	Saturday 23 May	Sunday 24 May
Bombay Bicycle Club; Loyle Carner; Lianne La Havas; Everything Everything; Nadine Shah; Nick Hakim; Nilüfer Yanya; The Orielles; Gengahr; Liz Lawrence	Tame Impala; Caribou; Glass Animals; Whitney; Låpsley; The Avalanches; Yellow Days; Rolling Blackouts Coastal Fever; Sir Was; Crumb; Kelly Lee Owens; Otherliine; Holy F; TOPS; Jessy Lanza; Faye Webster	Massive Attack; Thom Yorke; Nils Frahm; Young Fathers; Neneh Cherry; Sevdaliza; Fatoumata Diawara; TNGHT; Alfa Mist; GAIKA; Jacques Greene; Skinny Pelembe; Hotel Lux; Mad Professor

Weekend 2
Friday 29 May	Saturday 30 May	Sunday 31 May
Kraftwerk 3D; Iggy Pop; Johnny Marr; The Orb; Chromatics; Anna Calvi; Kim Gordon; Tinariwen; Grandmaster Flash; Juan Atkins; Jehnny Beth; Warmduscher; John Maus; A Certain Ratio; Pan Amsterdam	The Kooks; The Wombats; Tom Walker; Jake Bugg; Gang of Youths; Gabrielle Aplin; The Lathums; Bloxx; Lauran Hibberd	Not announced

=== 2021 ===
After a one-year hiatus, All Points East Festival returned in 2021. It was held on 27 August to 2 September 2021. The headliners were London Grammar, Jorja Smith, Jamie xx, Kano, Bicep, Foals, and Bombay Bicycle Club.

Friday, 27 August	Saturday, 28 August	Sunday, 29 August	Monday, 30 August
East Stage
London Grammar; Jorja Smith; Celeste; Kojey Radical; Matilda Homer	Jamie xx; Kano; Tom Misch; Arlo Parks; Nubya Garcia; Rebecca Vasmant	Bicep; Floating Points; Hot Chip; George FitzGerald & DJ Seinfeld; Ross from Friends; TSHA; Sofia Kourtesis	Foals; Caribou; Lianne La Havas; Arlo Parks; Flyte; Liz Lawrence
West Stage
Loyle Carner; Mahalia; Sons of Kemet; Kojaque; Enny; Joesef	Slowthai; Little Simz; Rema; Pa Salieu; Yellow Days	The Blessed Madonna; Mall Grab; Artwork; Overmono; Mr Jukes & Barney Artist; O'Flynn; Gabrielle Kwarteng; Yung Singh	Bombay Bicycle Club; Gang of Youths; Jade Bird; Maisie Peters; Holly Humberstone; Olivia Dean
North Arena
Mura Masa; Kelly Lee Owens; Låpsley; Omah Lay; Jadu Heart	HAAi; Romy; Fred Again; Sad Night Dynamite; Q	Prospa; Poté; Adelphi Music Factory; India Jordan; Donna Leake; Jaguar	Nadine Shah; Ghostpoet; The Magic Gang; Goat Girl; Working Men's Club; The Nightingales
6Music Stage
Daphni; Floating Points; Baby T; Tom Ravenscroft; Loraine James; FYI Chris	Dan Shake; Gilles Peterson; Thris Tian; Shy FX; Coco Maria; Colleen 'Cosmo' Murphy	Floorplan; Kettama; Mount Kimbie; Special Request; Josey Rebelle; Imogen	Octo Octa; Maya Jane Coles; Afrodeutsche; Jamz Supernova; Mary Anne Hobbs; Chloe Robinson
Firestone Stage
Jelani Blackman; Sipho.; Eloise; Conrad	Jockstrap; Kam-Bu; Mac Wetha; Sam Akpro	ELLES; REES; Sahar; Bearface; Flip the Lid	Buzzard Buzzard Buzzard; Noisy; Medicine Cabinet; The Lutras
PlayNext
Sad Night Dynamite; Tyson; Jodie Nicholson; Alisa Tully; Ewan Mainwood	Alewya; Chrissi; Priya Ragu; Aziya	Grainger; Jay Carder; Swoose; Rosie Lowe; Elkka	Scors; Swim School; Attawalpa; Ora Violet

=== 2022 ===
Weekend 1
Friday, 19 August	Saturday, 20 August
Gorillaz; IDLES; Pusha T; Yves Tumor; Self Esteem; Greentea Peng; Remi Wolf; Femi Kuti; Obongjayar; Gabriels; NewDad	The Chemical Brothers; Kraftwerk; Cici; Daniel Avery; Eliza Rose; Emerald B2B Jossy Mitsu; Erol Alkan; Floating Points; HAAi; Kareem Ali; Logic1000; Otik; Salute; Tourist

Weekend 2
Thursday, 25 August	Friday, 26 August	Saturday, 27 August	Sunday, 28 August
Tame Impala; FKJ; Caroline Polachek; The Blaze; Dry Cleaning; Goat; Sudan Archives	The National; Fleet Foxes; King Gizzard & The Lizard Wizard; Kurt Vile and the Violators; Perfume Genius; Low; Lucy Dacus; Rae Morris; Cassandra Jenkins; Bess Atwell	Disclosure; James Blake; Fred Again..; Charli XCX; Koffee; Freddie Gibbs; Channel Tres; Overmono; Enny; Joy Orbison; Sherelle; Tora-i; ELKKA; LCY; Yung Singh	Nick Cave and the Bad Seeds; Michael Kiwanuka; Sleaford Mods; Aldous Harding; Anna Calvi; Japanese Breakfast; Tinariwen; Jehnny Beth; Joan As Police Woman

=== 2023 ===
Weekend 1
Friday, 19 August	Saturday, 20 August
Stormzy; Kehlani; Sampha; Knucks; Lucky Daye; WSTRN; Ms Banks; The No Signal Stage	Aphex Twin; Bonobo; Arca; Fever Day; Jayda G; Jon Hopkins; Kelela; Actress; Desire; Giulia Tess; Hagop Tchaparian; Kai Campos: Mount Kimbie; LDSXOXO B2B Juliana Huxtable; Mafro; Surusinghe

Weekend 2
Friday, 25 August	Saturday, 26 August	Sunday, 27 August	Monday, 28 August
The Strokes; Yeah Yeah Yeahs; Girl in Red; Amyl and the Sniffers; Angel Olsen; Black Midi; Julie; HotWax	Jungle; Erykah Badu; Folamour; BADBADNOTGOOD; 070 Shake; Charlotte Day Wilson; Lil Silva; Ragz Originale; Pretty Girl	Dermot Kennedy; Olivia Dean; SG Lewis; Aurora; James Vincent McMorrow; Nick Mulvey; Novo Amor; Mocrieff; Rachel Chinouriri; Aby Coulibaly; Áine Deane; Lexie Carroll	Haim; Girl in Red; Confidence Man; Lizzy McAlpine; Tove Lo; Joesef; Snail Mail; Tamino; Romy; Avalon Emerson & The Charm; Mae Stephens; Nell Mescal; Gigi; Nieve Ella

=== 2024 ===
Weekend 1
Friday, 16 August	Saturday, 17 August	Sunday, 18 August
Kaytranada; Tems; Victoria Monét; Thundercat; Lancey Foux; Channel Tres; Amaarae; Jyoty; 4Batz; TSHA B2B KILIMANJARO; Lou Phelps; Felo Le Tee; Taylah Elaine B2B Arthi; Kitty Ca$h; Tkay Maidza; Durand Bernarr; Blanco; Maeta; Nia Smith; Bloody Civilian; Maleigh	Loyle Carner; Nas; André 3000; Ezra Collective; Lianne La Havas; Flying Lotus; Cymande; Glass Beams; Berlioz (DJ Set); Nubya Garcia; Songer; Sainté; Lola Young; Joe James; Enny; Navy Blue; Mrcy; Dana and Alden; Bricknasty	Mitski; Beabadoobee; TV Girl; Ethel Cain; Men I Trust; Arlo Parks; Suki Waterhouse; Sir Chloe; Wasia Project; Infinity Song; Wisp; Dan Whitlam; Lucius; Towa Bird; Good Neighbours; Strawberry Guy; bby; Hana Vu; Molly Payton; Emily Jeffri; Sienna Spiro; Jacob Alon

Weekend 2
Friday, 23 August	Saturday, 24 August (Field Day)	Sunday, 25 August
LCD Soundsystem; Jai Paul; Pixies; Floating Points; Jockstrap; Joy (Anonymous); The Kills; NewDad; Nation of Languages; Sofia Kourtesis; Eyedress; Joe Goddard; Vagabon; MSPAINT; Monobloc; Ratbag; Dove Ellis; Nick Ward	Justice / PinkPantheress; Charlotte De Witte presents Overdrive; 2manydjs; Bambii; Brutalismus 3000; George Riley; horsegiirL; I.JORDAN; John Glacier; Mura Masa; Romy; Sega Bodega; Shygirl presents Club Shy; Skin on Skin & KETTAMA; Tiga & Hudson Mohawke present LOVE MINUS ZERO; Vegyn; Yaeji; Yves Tumor	The Postal Service & Death Cab for Cutie; The Decemberists; Phoenix; Gossip; Lany; Say She She; Sleater-Kinney; Everything Everything; Yo La Tengo; Teenage Fanclub; Wednesday; Gustaf; Spiritual Cramp; Mehro; Soft Launch; John-Robert; Bo Staloch; Daily J; Cucamaras

=== 2025 ===
Weekend 1
Friday, 15 August	Saturday, 16 August	Sunday, 16 August
Provenance with Cleo Sol; Chronixx; Sault (band); Ms. Dynamite; NAO; and more	Chase & Status; Overmono; Shy FX; Nia Archives; and more	Not announced

Weekend 2
Friday, 22 August	Saturday, 23 August	Sunday, 24 August
Barry Can't Swim; Confidence Man (band); Orbital (band); Shygirl; and more	Raye; Tyla; Doechii (Cancelled due to the singers' illness, replaced by FKA Twigs).; Jade; NAO; Cat Burns; and more	The Maccabees (band); Bombay Bicycle Club; CMAT; Black Country, New Road; Sprints (band); and more

=== 2026 ===
Weekend 1
Friday, 21 August	Saturday, 22 August	Sunday, 23 August (Outbreak Festival)
Jorja Smith; Tems; Nia Archives; Ayra Starr; Odeal; KWN; Elmiene & The Sunday Service Choir; Destin Conrad; Uncle Waffles; DJ EZ; Maverick Sabre; Katy B; Wesley Joseph; Sekou; Bellah; Bricknasty; Crazy Cousinz; Keyrah; Common Saints; Demae; Konyikeh; Kels; Mychelle; Olympia Vitalis; Shivani Day; Jael; Tyler Lewis; XO; Shy FX with Breakage w/ MC GQ, Champion, Enny, Femi Koleoso, Rebel Clash, Saint Ludo	Lorde; PinkPantheress; Zara Larsson; Djo; Sienna Spiro; 2hollis; Oklou; Audrey Hobert; Rose Gray; Erin LeCount; Erika De Casier; Esha Tewari; Ear; ML Buch; Nell Mescal; Snuggle; Fabiana Palladino; Devon Again; Sofia and the Antoinettes; The Femcels; Elle Coves; Pixie McCann; Au/Ra; Nadia Loren; PIXY; Olivia C. Dacal; Alex Amor; Ninajirachi	Deftones; Amyl and the Sniffers; Interpol (band); Idles; AFI; EsDeeKid; JPEGMafia; Yousuke Yakimatsu; Salem (band); Basement; Wisp; Deafheaven; Show Me the Body; Mannequin Pussy; Blawan Live; Ecca Vandal; Brooki; Clarion; Kenny Mason; Overgrown; Reclus.É; Tooth; Villanelle; Good Health Good Wealth; The Public Eye

Weekend 2
Friday, 28 August	Saturday, 29 August	Sunday, 30 August
Tyler, the Creator; Rex Orange County; Turnstile (band); Mariah the Scientist; and more	Tyler, the Creator; Daniel Caesar; Baby Keem; Dijon; and more	Twenty One Pilots; Wunderhorse; Gang of Youths; Bbno$; Jessie Murph; Pvris; Half Alive; Hot Milk; Nova Twins; Kid Kapichi; Noahfinnce; Honey Revenge; Dead Pony; Mouth Culture; Leap; Josie Edwards; Ray Bull; Red Leather; Teen Jesus and the Jean Teasers; Witch Post; Artio; Emi Grace; Headsend; Reece Young; The Meffs; Ren
