= Toxe =

Swedish musician and DJ (born 1997)

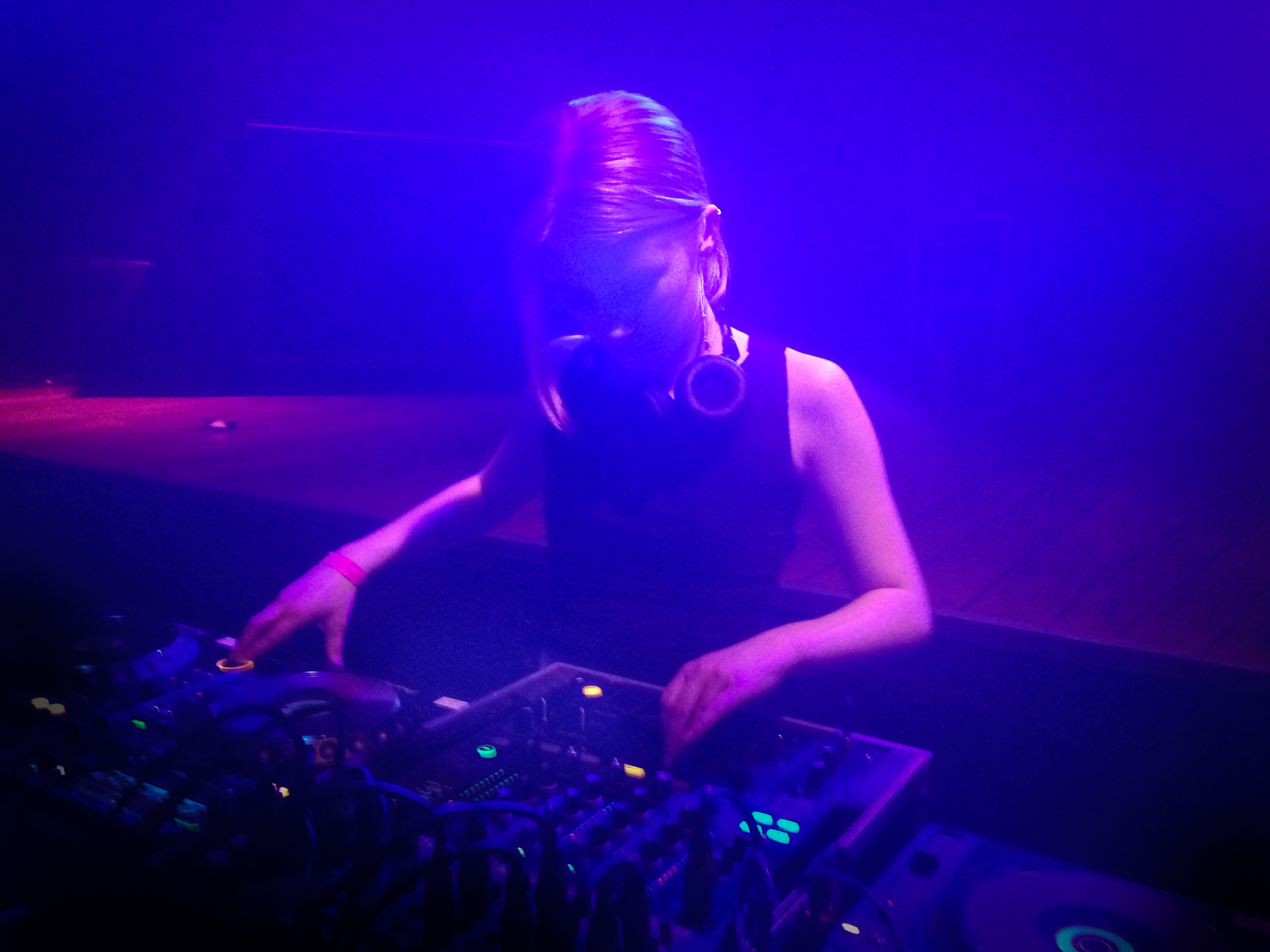
- Toxe at Sonic Acts in 2016

Background information
- Born: Tove Agélii; 1997 (age 28–29); Gothenburg, Sweden
- Genres: deconstructed club; art pop; electropop; electronica
- Occupations: Producer; singer
- Years active: 2015–present
- Labels: PAN; Year0001

Tove Agélii (born 1997), known as Toxe (/tɒksə/ TOX-uh) is a Swedish music producer and singer. Beginning her career through SoundCloud, she has since released two extended plays; Muscle Memory (2015) and Blinks (2018), an original soundtrack for The Story Of Leonora (2023), and two albums; Toxe2 (2024) and Bubble Treasure (2026).

== Early life and musical beginnings ==
Agélii was born in 1997 in Gothenburg, Sweden. Her parents were both artists, though she has said she had no musical background, using drawing as a creative outlet instead. She grew up listening to artists such as JJ of the Swedish record label Sincerely Yours. At age 14, she attended a music camp for girls, and at the conclusion of the camp performed a Deerhoof song, "The Perfect Me". Her older brother installed Ableton on her laptop, and she made her first track by largely sampling her voice. She has said that she "fell into" music during high school as a result of this.

== Career ==
October 2015, by which time Agélii was 17, saw her release the single "Determina", which had "slippery textures with menacingly sparse, creeping percussion" according to The Fader. She was living an "isolated life" in Gothenburg, though spent time travelling Europe to perform while also working on her high school studies, as she was getting bookings at Sónar, Club To Club, and Berghain. Motivated to join online friends from Tumblr and SoundCloud in real life, Agélii moved to Berlin at 18 years old, there studying art and architecture. She gained inspiration from London electronic collective Bala Club during this time. She released her 2015 debut EP Muscle Memory. In December 2015, she released the song "Xic" on Texan producer Rabit's label Halcyon Veil. This song sampled Britney Spears's "Toxic". When finishing up high school she released a remix of Slipknot's "Psychosocial", which she said was her "graduation song".

After leaving high school, she appeared at the Way Out West festival in August 2016; Dazed reported that she played "hard-as-nails industrial club music, screeching rap, hardstyle tempos, and leftfield R&B." By this point, she has also joined fellow musician Kablam at Drömfakulteten, a Stockholm-based music studio space. She was listed as one of The Guardian's "20 under 20" of teenage musical talent that September. She performed a Boiler Room studio set.

In 2017, she released a mix with The Fader which featured a piano intro, string melodies, and vocals from Aaliyah, and also released an audiovisual project, Morning Story, in collaboration with The Vinyl Factory, performed alongside artist Niclas Hille. Acne Studios' Spring 2018 womenswear fashion show used Agélii's music.

On 22 June 2018, she released an EP, Blinks, on the label PAN, self-described as "a fractal bloom of candied melodies and minor laments set in a sweep of frenetic rhythmic scenes". "Big Age" was a pre-release single. Exclaim! gave the EP an 8 out of 10, calling it "considerably more skeletal and deliberate". October 2018 saw Agélii opening for British musician Actress at the Experimental Media and Performing Arts Center; this was her first American performance.

In 2019, Agélii collaborated with Berlin-based producer Mechatok on the project Emiranda and released the EP My Face. In 2021, her music sound-tracked the short film The Story Of Leonora, which was later released by the record label PAN. In 2023, Dior used her music at a fashion show.

=== 2024–present: Toxe2 and Bubble Treasure ===
By 2024 Agélii had moved to New York and had graduated with an architecture degree. Her thesis was titled "The Publicity Of Domestic Space & Illusions Of Intimacy", focused on the public sharing of one's private life online. During her study she had written and produced Toxe2, her debut album. A single, "Som En Sol", released in June 2024, was listed as one of Vogue's contenders for song of the summer in 2024. Its music video features Agélii fighting her own alter ego in the snow. Toxe2 was released in August 2024 via Swedish multidisciplinary label Year0001. Mixmag described the album as "a bright and emotive body of work that combines Toxe’s innovative production techniques with a melodic sensibility".

Agélii remixed music for the Smerz remix project Big City Life Edits. In 2026, she self-released the singles "Wishing Well" and "A Girl Who Needs a Brain", announcing her next album Bubble Treasure for 15 September 2026. The 10-track, 23-minute album is her second solo album and her first album in the English language, mainly featuring love songs. Music from the album saw use at the New York COS Spring 2027 fashion show.

== Personal life ==
Agélii has a boyfriend from Key West, Florida in the United States.
