= Red Leather =

Red Leather may refer to:

- Red Leather (musician), American singer-songwriter
- Red Leather (song), 2024 song by Future, Metro Boomin and J. Cole
