= Smerz =

Norwegian electronic music duo

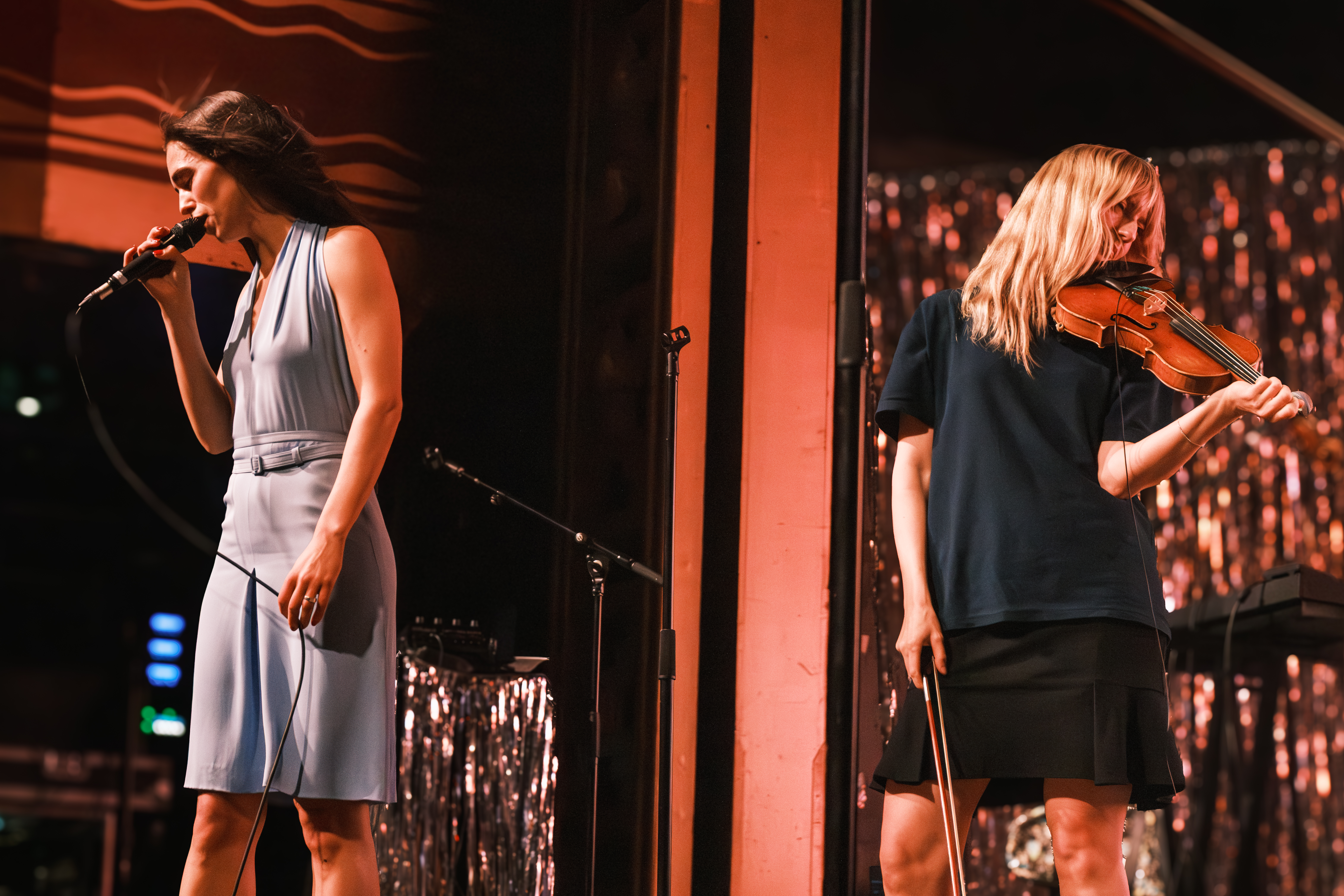
- Smerz at Webster Hall in 2026

Background information
- Origin: Oslo, Norway
- Genres: Electronic; Avant pop
- Years active: 2016–present
- Labels: XL Recordings, Escho, Shopping
- Members: Catharina Stoltenberg; Henriette Motzfeldt
- Website: smerz.no

Smerz is a Norwegian electronic music duo consisting of Catharina Stoltenberg and Henriette Motzfeldt. The duo splits their time between Oslo, Norway, and Copenhagen, Denmark. Their music has been described as "deadpan, vividly detailed electro-pop pulsating with personality, sensuality and dry humor." Their name comes from the German word herzschmerz, meaning "heartache".

== History ==
Catharina Stoltenberg and Henriette Motzfeldt met at high school in Oslo and moved to Copenhagen in 2011. In Copenhagen, Motzfeldt studied composition at the Rhythmic Music Conservatory, where she was classmates with several artists who would form part of a broader Danish alternative pop scene, including Erika de Casier, ML Buch, Astrid Sonne, and Fine Glindvad.

Catharina Stoltenberg is the daughter of Norwegian politician Jens Stoltenberg, who served as Prime Minister of Norway twice between 2000 and 2013.

Smerz released their debut single, "Because", on SoundCloud in 2016. Later that year, they followed it with the EP Okey, released on Escho in Denmark and HardUp in the UK. In 2017, the duo signed with XL Recordings and re-released Okey under the new label. Their next EP, Have fun, arrived in 2018, also through XL. In 2021, Smerz released their debut studio album, Believer, on XL Recordings. That same year, they released the mixtape Før og etter on their own label, Shopping.

Smerz have been hosting a monthly radio show on NTS Radio since 2017.

Smerz have played concerts at Tate Modern in London, MoMA PS1 in New York, Mutek in Mexico City and Montreal, Berghain in Berlin, Pitchfork Festival in Chicago, Roskilde Festival in Denmark, and Volksbühne in Berlin. On their 2025 fall tour of the United States, singer Sky Ferreira joined the duo for a surprise duet in Los Angeles.

In April 2026, the duo signed an open letter calling for a boycott of the Eurovision Song Contest 2026 due to Israel's participation amid its genocide in Gaza.

They opened for Lorde on the Ultrasound World Tour on 14 and 15 May 2026 in Los Angeles, and will open again in Pula, Croatia on 18 August 2026.

== Discography ==
=== Studio albums ===
Title	Year	Record label
Believer	2021	XL Recordings
Big City Life	2025	Escho

=== Remix albums ===
Title	Year	Record label
Big city life EDITS	2025	Escho

=== EPs ===
Title	Year	Record label
Okey	2016	Escho, HardUp
Okey	2017	XL Recordings
Have fun	2018	XL Recordings
Allina	2024	Shopping Records
Easy EP	2026	Escho

=== Mixtapes ===
Title	Year	Record label
Før og etter	2021	Shopping

=== Singles ===
Title	Year	Label	Album
"Because"	2016	Self-released	
"Because"	2016	Escho, HardUp	Okey
"Blessed"	2016	Escho, HardUp	Okey
"Sure"	2016	Escho, HardUp	Okey
"Oh my my"	2017	XL Recordings	Have fun
"No harm"	2017	XL Recordings	Have fun
"Half life"	2017	XL Recordings	Have fun
"Have fun"	2017	XL Recordings	Have fun
"Før og etter"	2020	Escho	Escho 15 år: Burgers for my new life
"The favourite" / "Rap interlude"	2020	XL Recordings	Believer
"I dont talk about that much" / "Hva hvis"	2020	XL Recordings	Believer
"Believer"	2021	XL Recordings	Believer
"Flashing"	2021	XL Recordings	Believer
"Remember"	2021	XL Recordings	Believer
"My Producer	2024	Shopping Records	Allina
"You got time and I got money"	2025	escho	

=== Commissioned work ===
Title	Year	Artist(s)	Type
Øy	2020	Carte Blanche	Music for dance performance
Miss France	2021	August Barron / ALL-IN Studio	Soundtrack for runway show
Debutante	2022	August Barron / ALL-IN Studio	Soundtrack for runway show
Allina	2024	August Barron / ALL-IN Studio	Soundtrack for runway show
Uptown Girl	2024	August Barron / ALL-IN Studio	Soundtrack for runway show
Real Housewife	2025	August Barron / ALL-IN Studio	Soundtrack for runway show

=== Sampled on ===
Title	Sample of	Year	Artist(s)	Album
"If U Ever"	"I don't talk about that much"	2021	Overmono	If U Ever
"Stop Playin"	"Flashing"	2022	Lil Baby and Jeremih	It's Only Me
"Good Lies2	"No Harm"	2023	Overmono	Good Lies

=== As featured artist(s) ===
Title	Year	Artist(s)	Album
"Guess What"	2017	Code Walk	Guess What
"Verdens smarteste person"	2022	Cezinando	Samtidig

=== Remixes ===
Title	Year	Artist(s)
"Friendly (Smerz Remix)"	2021	Erika de Casier
"Say you love me - Smerz EDIT"	2024	Astrid Sonne

=== Songwriting and production credits ===
Title	Year	Artist(s)	Album
"Verdens smarteste person"	2022	Cezinando	Samtidig
"ASAP"	2023	NewJeans	Get Up EP
