= Big City Life (album) =

Studio album by Smerz
- Released: 23 May 2025
- Recorded: 2023–2024
- Studios: Various (Copenhagen, Oslo, London)
- Genres: Electronic; pop
- Length: 38:00
- Label: Escho
- Producers: Henriette Motzfeldt; Catharina Stoltenberg

Smerz chronology
Believer (2021)	Big City Life (2025)

Big City Life (styled in sentence case) is the second studio album by Norwegian electronic music duo Smerz, consisting of Henriette Motzfeldt and Catharina Stoltenberg. It was released on 23 May 2025 through Escho. The album was preceded by the singles "A Thousand Lies", "You Got Time and I Got Money", "Roll the Dice" and "Feisty".

== Background and release ==
Big City Life was recorded between 2023 and 2024 in studios across Copenhagen, Oslo, and London, reflecting the duo's experiences in urban environments and their evolving sound. Building on their 2021 debut album Believer, Smerz explored themes of apathy, loneliness, love, and freedom, drawing inspiration from Copenhagen's experimental music scene and their collaborations with artists like Erika de Casier and NewJeans. The album was written, performed, and produced by Motzfeldt and Stoltenberg, with mixing by Smerz and Emil Thomsen and mastering by Emil Thomsen.

Announced in March 2025, the album was promoted with the release of "A Thousand Lies" in February 2025 and "You Got Time and I Got Money" in March 2025, the latter accompanied by a music video directed by Benjamin Barron and Bror August Vestbø. Smerz performed at venues like Copenhagen's Vega to support the album's launch, emphasizing its narrative of urban life and personal reflection.

A remix album, titled Big City Life Edits, was released on November 5, 2025. The album features collaborations with Yrdloop, Astrid Sonne, New York, Haloplus+, Molina, Erika de Casier, Fine, They Are Gutting a Body of Water, Mike, Zack Sekoff, Elias Rønnenfelt, Fousheé, ML Buch, Clarissa Connelly, Cezinando, Toxe, VVTZJ, and Clairo.

== Critical reception ==
Professional ratings
Aggregate scores
Source	Rating
Metacritic	86/100
Review scores
Source	Rating
Clash	8/10
God Is In The TV	4.5/5 stars
The Line of Best Fit	8/10
Paste	7.8/10
Pitchfork	8.6/10
Under the Radar	8/10

According to the review aggregator Metacritic, Big City Life received "universal acclaim" based on a weighted average score of 86 out of 100 from 6 critic scores. Pitchfork praised it as "a slinky postmodern pop album" and described it as "music that reminds you of the club but is by no means club music", awarding it the "Best New Music" designation, subsequently placing the album 11th at their "50 Best Albums of 2025" list, and at the top of the magazine's "Best 30 Pop Albums of 2025" list, epitomizing it as "Everything about Big city life feels like sleight of hand...". Clash described it as "a fizzing postmodern fairytale" capturing the chaos and wonder of city living with wit and vulnerability. Hayley Scott of The Quietus praised the album's themes, including "loneliness, mania, self-talk, affection."

== Track listing ==
No.	Title	Length
1.	"Big City Life"	2:08
2.	"But I Do"	3:02
3.	"Roll the Dice"	2:07
4.	"What"	0:26
5.	"Feisty"	2:40
6.	"A Thousand Lies"	4:11
7.	"Close"	4:29
8.	"You Got Time and I Got Money"	4:31
9.	"Big Dreams"	3:04
10.	"Street Style"	1:34
11.	"Imagine This"	2:27
12.	"Dreams"	4:09
13.	"Easy"	3:15
Total length:		38:03

Track listing and durations sourced from Bandcamp and Resident Advisor.

== Personnel ==
- Henriette Motzfeldt – vocals, production, songwriting
- Catharina Stoltenberg – vocals, production, songwriting, synthesizers
- Emil Thomsen – mixing, mastering

Personnel sourced from Bandcamp.

== Release history ==
Region	Date	Format	Label	Ref.
Various	23 May 2025	CD; digital download; streaming; vinyl	Escho	
