= EMI Records =

British record label

- Parent company: Universal Music Group (UMG) (2012–present); Previously EMI (1973–1979, 1996–2012); Thorn EMI (1979–1996); Warner Music Group (WMG) (2013–present; back catalogue)
- Founded: 1 January 1973; 53 years ago (original); 1 April 2014; 12 years ago (Japan relaunch); 30 June 2014; 12 years ago (Taiwan relaunch); 16 June 2020; 6 years ago (Europe relaunch); 19 June 2023; 3 years ago (Malaysia relaunch as EMI Music Malaysia); February 2024; 2 years ago (Philippines relaunch)
- Defunct: March 2013; 13 years ago (original)
- Distributors: Island EMI Label Group (in the United Kingdom); Interscope Capitol Labels Group/Republic (in the United States); Universal Music Japan (in Japan); Universal Music Taiwan (in Taiwan); Universal Music Malaysia (in Malaysia); UMG Philippines (in the Philippines); Universal Music Group (outside the UK, US and selected territories); Virgin Music Group (Virgin Records' British catalogue and repertoire only)
- Genre: Various
- Country of origin: United Kingdom
- Location: London, UK (European division); Tokyo, Japan (Japanese division)
- Official website: emirecords.com

EMI Records (formerly EMI Records Ltd.) is a British multinational record label owned by Universal Music Group. It was originally founded as a British flagship label by the music company EMI in 1972, and launched in January 1973 as the successor to its Columbia and Parlophone record labels. The label was later launched worldwide. It has a branch in India called EMI Records India, run by director Mohit Suri. In 2014, Universal Music Japan revived the label in Japan as the successor to EMI Records Japan. In June 2020, Universal revived the label as the successor to Virgin EMI, with Virgin Records now operating as an imprint of EMI Records. In February 2024, UMG Philippines relaunched EMI as a successor to the former EMI Philippines label after 22 years.

== History ==
Logo used from 1973 to 2010.

An E.M.I. Records Ltd. legal entity was created in 1956 as the record manufacturing and distribution arm of EMI in the UK. It oversaw EMI's various labels, including The Gramophone Co. Ltd., Columbia Graphophone Company, and Parlophone Co. Ltd.

In July 1965, the standalone EMI Record labels were extracted from E.M.I. Records Ltd. and folded into The Gramophone Company Ltd. On 1 July 1973, The Gramophone Co. Ltd. was renamed EMI Records Ltd. At the same time, E.M.I. Records Ltd. was wound down and its activities were absorbed into EMI Records Ltd.

Earlier, on 1 January 1973, all of The Gramophone Company Ltd. pop labels (Columbia, Parlophone, Harvest, Sovereign and Regal Zonophone) had been rebranded as EMI. EMI Records then signed new music artists that became worldwide successes: Kraftwerk, Renaissance, Queen, Olivia Newton-John, Iron Maiden, Kate Bush, Sheena Easton, and Pink Floyd (though some of these acts were on different labels in the US, not EMI's Capitol Records). In 1978, EMI launched EMI America Records as its second label in the United States after Capitol, and in 1988, EMI America later merged with sister label Manhattan Records, founded in 1984, becoming EMI Manhattan Records and eventually EMI Records USA when Capitol absorbed it in 1989. In June 1997, the EMI Records USA division was folded into Virgin Records and Capitol.

In October 1979, EMI Ltd. merged with Thorn Electrical Industries to become Thorn EMI, whose shareholders voted on 16 August 1996 in favour of demerging Thorn from EMI again. The recorded music division became EMI Group plc, and the electronics and rentals divisions were divested as Thorn plc.

In 2010, EMI Records opened a country music division, EMI Records Nashville, which includes on its roster Troy Olsen, Alan Jackson, Kelleigh Bannen, and Eric Church. EMI Records Nashville is a sister label to the Capitol Nashville unit of Universal Music Group.

Australia's most prolific artist, Slim Dusty, signed with the Columbia Graphophone Co. for Regal Zonophone Records in 1946 and remained with EMI until his death in 2003, selling over seven million records for the label in Australia by 2007.

Virgin EMI Records retained use of the EMI branding after Universal Music Group's acquisition of EMI in September 2012, but it is otherwise unrelated to the old label which was defunct and renamed Parlophone Records in 2013 and is now part of Warner Music Group. EMI Christian Music Group was renamed Capitol Christian Music Group. EMI Classics was sold to Warner Music Group in February 2013. After EU regulatory approval, EMI Classics was absorbed into Warner Classics in July 2013.

In April 2013, EMI Music Japan became defunct following Universal's acquisition of EMI. The company's successor was EMI Records Japan, a sublabel of Universal Music Japan. In February 2014, Universal Japan did a label reorganization, with more than half of the former EMI Records Japan artists being transferred to Nayutawave Records. Later that year, the two sublabels were combined and rebranded as EMI Records. Since 2018, Takeshi Okada has been the managing director of Universal Japan's EMI Records label. In 2020, the label launched an official YouTube channel, six years after the label was formed.

On 16 June 2020, Universal rebranded Virgin EMI Records as EMI Records and named Rebecca Allen (former president of UMG's Decca label) as the label's president.

In September 2020, Universal launched Motown UK, under EMI Records.

In January 2023, EMI launched EMI North, based in Leeds, becoming the "first major to open a physical space outside of London". In July 2023, Universal Japan announced a new imprint label, Holo-n, which will operate under their EMI Records division in partnership with Hololive Production.

In February 2024, UMG Philippines relaunched EMI Records as a successor to the former EMI Philippines label, now known as PolyEast Records.

== See also ==
- Abbey Road Studios
- List of record labels
- List of EMI Records artists
