= Believer (Smerz album) =

Studio album by Smerz
- Released: 26 February 2021
- Genres: Electronic; art pop
- Length: 46:58
- Label: XL
- Producers: Catharina Stoltenberg; Henriette Motzfeldt

Smerz chronology
Believer (2021)	Big City Life (2025)

Believer is the debut studio album by Smerz, a Norwegian music duo consisting of Catharina Stoltenberg and Henriette Motzfeldt. It was released on 26 February 2021 through XL Recordings. It received generally favorable reviews from critics.

== Background ==
Believer was produced in various remote cabins in Norway. Some of the album's lyrics were written in the woods. The creation of the album took place while the members Catharina Stoltenberg and Henriette Motzfeldt were completing degrees.

== Critical reception ==
Professional ratings
Aggregate scores
Source	Rating
Metacritic	73/100
Review scores
Source	Rating
AllMusic	3/5 stars
Beats Per Minute	60%
The Line of Best Fit	8/10
MusicOMH	4/5 stars
Pitchfork	7.7/10
PopMatters	7/10

According to the review aggregator Metacritic, Believer received "generally favorable reviews" based on a weighted average score of 73 out of 100 from 7 critic scores.

Ethan Reis of Beats Per Minute commented that the album is "less club-oriented than previous releases, instead incorporating more violin and classical instruments to achieve a synthesis of classical and dance music that is occasionally inscrutable." Parker Desautell of PopMatters stated, "Both lyrically and sonically, Believer is a bold, risk-taking LP that charts a wild, uneven course through trance, classical, R&B, and hip-hop." He added, "Sometimes it conjures images of the snowy Norwegian countryside, and other times it drops you squarely on the dancefloor."

Pitchfork included the album's title track, "Believer", on its list of "The Best Progressive Pop Music of 2021".

== Track listing ==
All tracks are written by Catharina Stoltenberg and Henriette Motzfeldt.

Believer track listing
No.	Title	Length
1.	"Gitarriff"	2:06
2.	"Max"	4:17
3.	"Believer"	4:12
4.	"Versace Strings"	2:03
5.	"Rain"	4:14
6.	"4 Temaer"	1:53
7.	"Hester"	4:54
8.	"Flashing"	2:40
9.	"The Favourite"	1:43
10.	"Rap Interlude"	0:35
11.	"Sonette"	2:07
12.	"Glassbord"	2:57
13.	"Grand Piano"	1:43
14.	"Missy"	1:06
15.	"I Don't Talk About That Much"	3:51
16.	"Hva Hvis"	2:31
17.	"Remember (ghost track on some releases)"	3:57
Total length:		46:58

Japanese edition CD bonus tracks: Have Fun
No.	Title	Length
17.	"Worth It"	3:51
18.	"No Harm"	3:48
19.	"Oh My My"	2:38
20.	"Girl 2"	2:15
21.	"Have Fun"	2:44
22.	"Half Life"	3:31
23.	"Fitness"	2:20
24.	"Bail on Me"	2:51
Total length:		68:56

== Personnel ==
Credits adapted from liner notes.

- Catharina Stoltenberg – performance, production, engineering
- Henriette Motzfeldt – performance, production, engineering
- Peder Mannerfelt – additional production (2), additional mixing (3, 6)
- Hallvard Braaten Steinhovden – cello (3, 5, 12)
- Lone Meinich – violin (5, 13)
- Moa Meinich – violin (5, 13)
- Andrea Green Novel – flute (12)
- Kasper Marott – additional drum programming (15)
- Chris Elms – mixing
- Joel Krozer – mastering
- Benjamin Barron – art direction, design, cyanotype, photography
- Elif Tanman – design
- Lotte Lovise Brøndbo – set design, cyanotype
- Bror August Vestbø – costume design
- Tina Solberg – styling
- Frida Stø – woodwork
- Vilde Krogsmyr Holberg – woodwork
- Jan Khur – lighting assistance
- Ingrid Nymoen – cover modeling
