= Where Are We Going? =

Studio album by Octo Octa
- Released: March 24, 2017
- Genre: Deep house; chill-out; techno
- Length: 58:48
- Label: HNYTRX
- Producer: Octo Octa; Jackie House

Octo Octa chronology
| My Feelings Toward You (2017) | Where Are We Going? (2017) | Resonant Body (2019) |

Singles from Where Are We Going?
- 1. "Move On (Let Go) (De-Stress Mix)" Released: February 17, 2018

Where Are We Going? is the fourth studio album of American house producer Maya Bouldry-Morrison, known by her stage name as Octo Octa. It was released in March 2017 by HNYTRX, a sub-imprint of queer label Honey Soundsystem. It is her first album to be released after publicly revealing in 2016 that she was transgender and contains a much more uplifting tone than the records she released before revealing her gender identity. While still following the classic house sound of her past releases, Bouldry-Morrison intended the LP to be a more "overt" statement than the "coded queer statement" of her previous album Between Two Selves (2013). The album was well received by critics and landed on the year-end lists of Crack Magazine, Mixmag, Noisey, and Resident Advisor.

== Background and concept ==
In an interview for Resident Advisor published on February 3, 2016, Bouldry-Morrison came out as a trans woman and claimed she was planning to start producing an album conceptually about her transitioning process. She wrote Where Are We Going? in 2016 shortly after doing the interview. She cites the records of DJ Sprinkles such as Routes Not Roots (2006) and Midtown 120 Blues (2008) as inspiration to make the record: "Being trans, seeing art that's publicly being written by a trans producer meant a lot to me. I was happy to find work that was openly talking about it."

Feeling that Bouldry-Morrison's previous album, Between Two Selves (2013) was a "coded queer statement," she wanted to make Where Are We Going? a more "overt" statement about her sexuality. As such, she moved from 100% Silk to a queer label named Honey Soundsystem to work with Jackie House on the album: "I really wanted to do this record with an overtly queer label. That was super important to me. Also, Jackie just is really good at helping me realize what it should be and what we should be doing around it." House handled many duties regarding the LP, such as the mastering of the songs and the record's promotion.

== Composition ==
Where Are We Going? continues Octo Octa's signature style of 1990s-inspired, Balearic-tinged piano-heavy chill-out house music. Differences from previous records include more complex compositions, less vocal samples, and a brighter tone: while her past releases contained uncertain feelings that reflected her worries regarding revealing her gender identity publicly, Where Are We Going? has an uplifting tone. However, it ends on a negative note with the second part of the title track. As she explained its meaning, "I’m good, overall, but I face a lot of unexpected interactions and emotions every day that I didn’t foresee before being out."

"No More Pain (Promises To A Younger Self)" and "Move On (Let Go) (De-stress Mix)" are the album's slower moments, departing from Octo Octa's house sound for "pensive piano lilts" and Amen breaks, summarized Crack Magazine. For "No More Pain," Bouldry-Morrison intended to make the same type of IDM and breakcore that she used to produce as a teenager. Bouldry-Morrison made two versions of "Move On (Let Go)," the final one included on the album (the "De-stress Mix") and the "Stress Mix," which included a drum ’n’ bass-style bassline.

== Cover art ==
The cover art for Where Are We Going is a photograph taken by Jeffrey McMahan in a San Francisco hotel bedroom during a six-hour photoshoot session. It depicts Bouldry-Morrison kneeling on a bed wearing a mini-dress with her hair being blown by a wind machine. The aesthetic of the cover art differs heavily from those of her 100% Silk records, which used images of body parts and facial expressions of other people. This is because she made her transgender identity an essential part of the album: "For a long time I never took pictures of myself because I didn’t like my body. It’s only been a couple of years now, especially since publicly transitioning, that I’ve finally felt OK with how I look."

== Critical reception ==
Professional ratings
Review scores
| Source | Rating |
|---|---|
| Exclaim! | 7/10 |
| Pitchfork | 7.6/10 |
| Resident Advisor | 4.1/5 |

Mixmag, listing the album as one of the top 50 best LPs of 2017 (see Accolades), honored it as "a superlative example of timeless dance music." Writer Will Lynch claimed Where Are We Going? "reveals Bouldry-Morrison to be a mature and gifted producer." He praised its "inspired" production and ability of using sounds to represent the producer's personal life, something which was also spotlighted in a Pitchfork review of the album: "Bouldry-Morrison never feels bound to offer an answer, but through the vivid ambivalence of her music, you can sense a warming to new possibility." Lynch's only criticism of the record was that it sounded a little too much like the works of DJ Sprinkles, a major influence of Bouldry-Morrison's music.

== Accolades ==
| Publication | Accolade | Rank | Ref. |
|---|---|---|---|
| Crack Magazine | The Top 100 Albums of 2017 | 5 | |
| Mixmag | The Top 50 Albums of 2017 | 22 | |
| Noisey | The 100 Best Albums of 2017 | 74 | |
| Resident Advisor | 2017's Best Albums | — | |

== Track listing ==
Where Are We Going? – Standard edition
| No. | Title | Length |
|---|---|---|
| 1. | "Where Are We Going? Pt. 1" | 7:31 |
| 2. | "On Your Lips" | 6:09 |
| 3. | "Fleeting Moments Of Freedom (Wooo)" | 6:24 |
| 4. | "Until The Moon Sets" | 5:03 |
| 5. | "No More Pain (Promises To A Younger Self)" | 2:36 |
| 6. | "Move On (Let Go) (De-Stress Mix)" | 5:11 |
| 7. | "Preparation Rituals" | 7:55 |
| 8. | "Adrift" | 8:47 |
| 9. | "Where Are We Going? Pt. 2" | 9:12 |
| Total length: | | 58:48 |

Where Are We Going? – EP version
| No. | Title | Length |
|---|---|---|
| 1. | "Move On (Let Go) (De-Stress Mix)" | 5:10 |
| 2. | "On Your Lips" | 6:11 |
| 3. | "Where Are We Going? Pt. 2" | 9:11 |
| Total length: | | 20:32 |

== Release history ==
| Region | Date | Format(s) | Label |
|---|---|---|---|
| Worldwide – EP | March 10, 2017 | Digital download | HNYTRX |
| Worldwide – LP | March 24, 2017 | Digital download | HNYTRX |
