= Silence Is Loud =

Studio album by Nia Archives
- Released: 12 April 2024
- Length: 35:15
- Labels: Hijinxx; Island
- Producers: Nia Archives; Ethan P. Flynn

Nia Archives chronology
| Sunrise Bang Ur Head Against Tha Wall (Remixes) (2023) | Silence Is Loud (2024) | Emotional Junglist (2026) |

Singles from Silence Is Loud
- 1. "Forbidden Feelingz" Released: 14 October 2021; 2. "So Tell Me..." Released: 16 November 2022; 3. "Crowded Roomz" Released: 19 January 2024; 4. "Silence Is Loud" Released: 15 February 2024; 5. "Unfinished Business" Released: 14 March 2024; 6. "Cards On The Table" Released: 10 April 2024

Silence Is Loud is the debut studio album by English record producer, DJ and singer-songwriter Nia Archives. It was released on 12 April 2024 through Hijinxx and Island Records. Archives described the album as an attempt to bring together jungle music with songwriting ideas associated with Britpop. The album received generally positive reviews from critics, and it debuted at number 16 on the UK Albums Chart, becoming her first release to enter the main weekly listing; it was also her second to appear on the UK Albums Chart Update. It was nominated for the 2024 Mercury Prize.

== Background and production ==
In 2022 and 2023, Archives released the extended plays Forbidden Feelingz and Sunrise Bang Ur Head Against Tha Wall. The latter charted at number 49 on the UK Albums Chart Update, but did not appear on the end-of-week list.

For Silence Is Loud, Archives worked with Ethan P. Flynn, who had previously collaborated with FKA Twigs and David Byrne. She spent five months developing the record, much of it in Flynn's home studio at the Barbican Estate. In interviews, she described a routine of writing during mornings, building drum patterns on her laptop, and then bringing demos to Flynn; the pair would often complete songs within a few hours.

Archives characterised the album as a fusion of jungle music with Britpop influence, and pointed to groups including The Beatles, Blur and Oasis when discussing her approach to songwriting. She also connected the title to what she said were contrasting meanings of silence. Elaborating further during an interview with The Guardian, she said:

Jungle was the punk of dance music – it's rebellious. It's also Black British music. [...] I liked the loose link from jungle to Britpop. In the '90s, you'd have the Gallagher brothers hanging out with Goldie and Björk. That mismatch of people, like David Bowie going to the Blue Note on a Sunday night in Hoxton [to attend the jungle club night Metalheadz], I love that culture. [For me, Britpop is] a feeling of optimism. When listening to Britpop, there's a feeling of togetherness.

== Promotion and release ==
Archives released the single "Crowded Roomz" in January 2024, and linked it to experiences of touring and social pressure. The accompanying music video features Maverick Sabre and Corbin Shaw. The following month, she announced the album's track listing, which included "Crowded Roomz" alongside "Forbidden Feelingz" and "So Tell Me...". These tracks had previously appeared on Forbidden Feelingz and Sunrise Bang Ur Head Against Tha Wall, respectively.

In February 2024, Archives released the title track. She described it as a song about her relationship with her brother, and reviewers noted that it opens with a heavily distorted scream and uses a four-to-the-floor kick drum. She followed it in March with "Unfinished Business", a track centred on unresolved feelings from a previous relationship.

Silence Is Loud was released on 12 April 2024, alongside a video for "Cards On The Table". The cover artwork shows Archives wearing a diamante Union Jack grill; a limited edition was issued on "Union Jack vinyl".

The release coincided with a period in which several artists referenced mid-1990s Britain, including Rachel Chinouriri's What a Devastating Turn of Events and Dua Lipa's Radical Optimism. In the weeks before release, Archives wore a Union Jack diamond grill in a photoshoot for ES Magazine, and performed in front of a large Union Jack flag at a launch party for issue 18 of The Face.

"Tell Me What It's Like" includes a spoken-word introduction by Goldie, while the closing track, "Silence Is Loud (Reprise)", features Archives singing over a synth backing. Several tracks omit a chorus; most songs run for around three minutes, and "So Tell Me..." extends to nearly four. Reviews described the lyrics as exploring personal themes, including estrangement within family relationships and unrequited love. Press materials also listed a range of influences, from Britpop and Motown to IDM, Madchester and old-school hardcore.

== Critical reception ==
Professional ratings
Aggregate scores
| Source | Rating |
|---|---|
| Metacritic | 78/100 |
Review scores
| Source | Rating |
| AllMusic | 4/5 stars |
| Clash | 8/10 |
| DIY | 4.5/5 stars |
| Exclaim! | 7/10 |
| The Line of Best Fit | 7/10 |
| musicOMH | 3.5/5 stars |
| NME | 4/5 stars |
| Pitchfork | 7.3/10 |
| The Skinny | 3/5 stars |
| Slant | 3/5 stars |

Silence is Loud drew generally positive reviews from music critics, earning a Metacritic score of 78 out of 100, based on 12 reviews. Paul Simpson of AllMusic wrote that the album's near-constant "anxiety and doubt [...] all goes down easily and thrillingly due to the winning combination of slamming breakbeats and Nia's charming personality, as well as the chiming guitar melodies influenced by samba and dreamy indie rock", though felt that her "always sincere" lyrics could "be a bit on-the-nose at times". Joe Muggs of The Arts Desk described Silence Is Loud as "a singer-songwriter record, unmistakeably made by someone raised in the 2000s era of Lily Allen, Kate Nash, Arctic Monkeys, Amy Winehouse", complete with "the "junglist" hardcore rave momentum and soundsystem power of her early work". Robin Murray of Clash wrote that "as a mission statement, 'Silence Is Loud' – from its title down – [was] virtually perfect for the producer" and posited it as an "early Mercury tip", while Daisy Carter of DIY described the album as "jam-packed" without ever feeling "too much or too choppy", and wrote that "for all its referential nods and sonic variation, this is still a project that is cohesively, distinctly her".

Martyn Young of Dork found the album to contain "plenty of bone-rattling and hyped-up breakbeats here", and described Silence Is Loud as "an album of songs, frequently beautiful and affecting songs, in which the power of the beats amplifies the emotional resonance of her voice". Jordan Currie of Exclaim! opined that "her signature breakbeat [was] the ideal vehicle to communicate the chaos of being the overwhelmed girl in the corner of the party", though felt that her breakbeats were "often somewhat indistinct from one another", and Ludovic Hunter-Tilney of the Financial Times wrote that Archives had "turn[ed] jungle and drum and bass into pop music [...] with eclecticism and personality, in the spirit of jungle's original nuttahs". Ed Power of the i described the album as "a spikily enjoyable mash-up of Blur-meets-Goldie, Liam-Gallagher-does-LJT-Bukem" [sic] and "the work of an artist with both a magpie's eye for retro flourishes and a talent for bare-boned songwriting", and compared her "landfill indie-era confessional pop" to that of Nash, Allen, and Caity Baser.

Matt Young of The Line of Best Fit felt that the album was "better at hitting the mark than at other times", and singled out "Forbidden Feelingz", "Blind Devotion" and "Tell Me What It's Like" for "lag[ging] in the album's core". Louder Than War's Banjo wrote that "taken as a whole, Silence Is Loud is a tremendous debut that surely marks Nia Archives' move into the spotlight of being a major act". John Murphy of MusicOMH compared her lyrics with those of Lily Allen and Kate Nash, though opined "the unbroken sound of chaotic DnB percussion can be become a bit wearying for someone unaccustomed to the jungle sound" and found that "Silence Is Loud (Reprise)", in which Archives sung to nothing but a backing synth, was a "welcome" change in sound. Kyann-Sian Williams of NME also spoke highly of "Silence Is Loud (Reprise)", describing it as the album's "biggest highlight" and the album as a "collection of tranquil tracks that showcase her ability to craft intricate songs beyond a hedonistic floorfiller".

Alexis Petridis observed "a certain colloquial snottiness to the vocals" and described her voice as "strong and appealingly unmannered", though felt the songwriting to be uneven, opining that it "ranges from slightly undercooked [...] to genuinely striking, even daring"; he did however favourably compare the album to Goldie and Noel Gallagher's "Temper Temper", and felt that the album was "impressive and bold enough to leave you wondering how she might develop, rather than worrying where she can go next". He also noted that Archives's choice to tether breakbeats to a four-to-the-floor kick drum "would have been absolutely verboten in 90s jungle". Kieran Press-Reynolds of Pitchfork described her sound as "the sound of 100 thoughts racing through your head when you realize your situationship lied to you" but felt that "many songs offer only vague sketches of emotional conflicts", and opined that "in the process of supersizing her sound, Nia has lost some of the subtle charm that made her early music so addictive".

Ben Jolley of Rolling Stone wrote that the album "boasts plenty of intense bass lines to keep jungle purists satisfied", and opined that "the record's intricately detailed, narrative-driven songs make this a collection to be experienced in full, from start to finish". Noah Barker of The Skinny opined that the album played "like the record's runtime was set before material was allotted to the space, unleashing a high-octane sugar rush in a space fit to dilute it into the unbearableness of being palatable", and Charles Lyons-Burt of Slant Magazine compared Archives's vocals to Amy Winehouse wrote that the album "often sounds like she's both narrating a scene and retreating back into herself", and felt that Archives was "ultimately unable to wring enough pathos from the narrative she presents".

== Commercial performance ==
On the UK Albums Chart dated April 25, 2024, Silence is Loud debuted at number 16, becoming her first UK Albums Chart entry; the album also became her second entry on the midweek chart, and debuted atop the UK's Dance Albums Chart. In July 2024, the album was nominated for a Mercury Prize after selling 9,870 units in the UK.

== Track listing ==
All tracks are written by Dehaney Hunt and Ethan P. Flynn, except where noted.

| No. | Title | Length |
|---|---|---|
| 1. | "Silence Is Loud" | 2:37 |
| 2. | "Cards On The Table" | 2:56 |
| 3. | "Unfinished Business" | 3:16 |
| 4. | "Crowded Roomz" | 2:52 |
| 5. | "Forbidden Feelingz" (Nia Archives) | 2:46 |
| 6. | "Blind Devotion" | 1:47 |
| 7. | "Tell Me What It's Like?" | 3:10 |
| 8. | "Nightmares" | 2:42 |
| 9. | "F.A.M.I.L.Y" | 2:39 |
| 10. | "Out Of Options" | 2:08 |
| 11. | "Silence Is Loud (Reprise)" | 2:28 |
| 12. | "Killjoy !" | 2:07 |
| 13. | "So Tell Me..." (Hunt, Flynn, James Jacob, Ed Thomas) | 3:47 |
| Total length: | | 35:15 |

== Personnel ==
Musicians

- Nia Archives – vocals (all tracks), drum programming (tracks 1–3, 6–10, 12, 13)
- Ethan P. Flynn – keyboards, synthesizer (tracks 1–4, 6–12); electric guitar (1, 2, 4, 6–9, 11), bass guitar (1, 2, 4, 7, 10, 12), synth bass (1, 3, 6, 7, 10–12), acoustic guitar (2–4, 7), organ (2, 3, 9), slide guitar (2), clavichord (3, 4, 7, 9), Mellotron (6), bouzouki (7), piano (8, 10–12), background vocals (8)
- Nathan Boddy – programming (tracks 1, 4, 7, 9, 12)
- Felix Stephens – cello (track 9)
- Ed Thomas – guitar (track 13)

Technical

- Nia Archives – production (all tracks), music production (track 4)
- Ethan P. Flynn – production, engineering (tracks 1–4, 6–12)
- Jakwob – production (track 13), mixing (5, 13)
- Matt Colton – mastering (tracks 1–4, 6–12)
- Foundry Mastering – mastering (track 5)
- Stuart Hawkes – mastering (track 13)
- Nathan Boddy – mixing (tracks 1–12); music production (1, 3, 4, 7, 9, 12)
- Lilian Nuthall – mixing assistance (tracks 1–4, 6–12)

== Charts ==
| Chart (2024) | Peak position |
|---|---|
| Scottish Albums (Official Charts) | 9 |
| UK Albums (Official Charts) | 16 |
| UK Album Downloads (Official Charts) | 41 |
| UK Dance Albums (Official Charts) | 1 |
