= Suntub =

Studio album by ML Buch
- Released: 27 October 2023
- Genres: Art rock; soft rock; avant-pop; electronic; indie pop
- Length: 55:26
- Label: 15 Love
- Producer: ML Buch

ML Buch chronology
Skinned (2020)	Suntub (2023)

Suntub is the second studio album by Danish musician ML Buch, released on 27 October 2023 through 15 Love. Buch self-produced and played all instruments on the album aside from several drum recordings, working on it over the span of five years. It received acclaim from music critics, later appearing on several lists of the best albums of 2023.

== Background and recording ==
Buch spent five years making Suntub, which she explained was "the time it needed"; for three of those years she lived in the "countryside by the ocean", explaining that she "need[ed] to be on [her] own to make this music". Buch played all instruments, and produced and mixed the record herself, aside from several drum recordings played by her friend Tanya. Buch recorded her vocals in her car and reamped her guitar through her car's stereo as well as "in Kalundborg swimming pool, sauna, [and] changing room".

== Critical reception ==
Professional ratings
Review scores
Source	Rating
Paste	8.4/10
Pitchfork	8.0/10

Suntub was released to critical acclaim. Philip Sherburne of Pitchfork stated that Suntub "focuses on more abstract and corporeal themes" than Buch's debut album Skinned (2020), and replaces that album's "overtly electronic elements" with "sparkling guitars, frictionless rock drumming, and vocal melodies rendered with airbrushed clarity". Sherburne concluded that "Outwardly, Suntub is so glossy that it suggests a kind of normcore, a pastiche of gentle alt-rock. Below the surface, however, Buch's strange curves and fleshless hands point in a far more cryptic direction." Pitchfork would go on to name the album the thirteenth best of the 2020s so far. Exclaim! named the tracks "Well Bucket" and "Working It Out" staff picks upon their release ahead of the album in September.

Paste critic Austin Jones named Suntub a "curious psychedelic experiment in indie pop with sublime guitar tone," adding that Buch's "warped, spindly and bubbling" guitar work marks the biggest advance in her songwriting. Stereogum's Daniel Bromfield believes the album "captures the feeling of the early internet era without any obvious signifiers," citing the "sleek contours" and hyperreal feel of the music.

Exclaim! ranked the album the ninth best album of 2023, with the publication's Kaelen Bell describing it as "pastoral art rock imbued with heaving, sticky humanity, a place where past and present collide constantly to create entirely new forms" as well as having a "MIDI-warped landscape, an alien environment sketched in silvery riffs and dewy electronics". Gorilla vs. Bear ranked it the second best album of 2023, calling it "the most soothing and unsettlingly beautiful record of the year" that "envelops the listener in an otherworldly cocoon by tapping into some uncanny, unshakeable deja-vu" and "feels very real, like a gleaming, half-remembered soft-rock mirage you keep hearing in your warmest, fuzziest dreams".

In 2025, Resident Advisor ranked Suntub at number 34 in their list of "The Best Electronic Records 2000–25"; in the accompanying writeup, contributor Rachel Grace Almedia commented that "[ML Buch's] seven-string Stratocaster is her paintbrush, but through electronic manipulation—pitch-bends, DAW plugins, re-amps through car stereos—she completes her drifting avant-pop tour de force. Just like art, water and indeed the sun, Suntub is a regenerative life-giver.

== Track listing ==
Suntub track listing
No.	Title	Length
1.	"Pan Over the Hill"	5:23
2.	"Whoosh"	2:30
3.	"Flames Shards Goo"	3:48
4.	"Somewhere"	3:49
5.	"High Speed Calm Air Tonight"	4:40
6.	"Fleshless Hand"	5:53
7.	"Slide"	2:54
8.	"Clearing"	3:13
9.	"Well Bucket"	3:16
10.	"Big Sun"	3:46
11.	"Solid"	4:38
12.	"Dust Beam"	2:06
13.	"River Mouth"	4:59
14.	"Mirror Bridge"	0:52
15.	"Working It Out"	3:39
Total length:		55:26

CD bonus track
No.	Title	Length
16.	"Sway Walking"	3:13
Total length:		58:39

Bandcamp bonus tracks
No.	Title	Length
16.	"Opener"	1:52
17.	"Sway Walking"	3:13
18.	"Suncrumb Trail"	2:50
19.	"Growing Eyes, Blade of Cloud, Rolling Chill"	1:04
20.	"Moving Light, Change"	4:50
21.	"Halfdark, Slow Blinking"	1:38
Total length:		70:53

== Personnel ==
- ML Buch – vocals, all instruments, producer, mixing
- Tanya – several drum recordings
- Amir Shoat – mastering

== Charts ==
Chart performance for Suntub
Chart (2024)	Peak position
Danish Albums (Hitlisten)	14
