= What I Breathe =

Studio album by Mall Grab
- Released: 5 August 2022
- Genre: Electronic
- Length: 60:03
- Label: Looking for Trouble
- Producer: Mall Grab

Mall Grab chronology
Worship Friendship (2020)	What I Breathe (2022)

What I Breathe is the debut studio album by Australian record producer Jordon Alexander under the pseudonym Mall Grab. It was released on 5 August 2022 through his own record label Looking for Trouble. It topped the UK Dance Albums Chart. It received generally favorable reviews from critics.

== Background ==
What I Breathe was produced by Mall Grab over the course of 18 months. It features guest appearances from Turnstile vocalist Brendan Yates, Nia Archives, Novelist, and D Double E. Mall Grab's own vocals are also featured on the songs "Without the Sun" and "Lost in Harajuku". "Lost in Harajaku" was written in a Tokyo hotel room, using GarageBand. The album's cover art is a photograph featuring six Golden Retrievers.

== Critical reception ==
Professional ratings
Aggregate scores
Source	Rating
Metacritic	69/100
Review scores
Source	Rating
AllMusic	3.5/5 stars
Beats Per Minute	63%
DIY	3.5/5 stars
The Line of Best Fit	8/10
Pitchfork	5.8/10

According to the review aggregator Metacritic, What I Breathe received "generally favorable reviews" based on a weighted average score of 69 out of 100 from 5 critic scores.

Paul Simpson of AllMusic called the album "a somewhat nostalgic but still forward-thinking trip through his various interests." He added, "Barely containing anything that could be described as laid-back, carefree house, the tracks are generally vivid and brimming with energy." Josh LaClair of Beats Per Minute commented that "the first Mall Grab album is decidedly too busy and scattered to be much of anything but a letdown for most fans." Philip Sherburne of Pitchfork stated, "Seven years into a career spent flipping familiar references into crowd-pleasing shapes, it's still not clear who [Jordon] Alexander really is, beyond the sum of his influences."

=== Accolades ===
Year-end lists for What I Breathe
Publication	List	Rank	Ref.
Resident Advisor	The Best Albums of 2022	—	

== Track listing ==
What I Breathe track listing
No.	Title	Length
1.	"Hand in Hand Through Wonderland"	5:28
2.	"I Can Remember It So Vividly"	4:28
3.	"Love Reigns"	4:39
4.	"Understand" (featuring Brendan Yates)	3:44
5.	"Patience" (featuring Nia Archives)	4:18
6.	"Without the Sun"	4:27
7.	"Spirit Wave"	4:25
8.	"Breathing"	4:47
9.	"Intercity Relations"	4:46
10.	"Times Change" (featuring Novelist and D Double E)	3:05
11.	"Distant Conversation"	5:17
12.	"Metaphysical"	5:01
13.	"Lost in Harajuku"	4:37
Total length:		60:03

== Personnel ==
Credits adapted from liner notes.

- Jordon Alexander – production
- Brendan Yates – guest appearance (4)
- Nia Archives – guest appearance (5)
- Novelist – guest appearance (10)
- D Double E – guest appearance (10)
- Matt Karmil – mixing
- Matt Colton – mastering
- Super Goog – design
- Rob Jones – cover photography

== Charts ==
Chart performance for What I Breathe
Chart (2022)	Peak position
Scottish Albums (OCC)	8
UK Albums (OCC)	51
UK Dance Albums (OCC)	1
