= Emotional Junglist =

Studio album by Nia Archives
- Released: 17 July 2026
- Genres: Jungle; R&B; Britpop; indie pop
- Length: 40:14
- Labels: Hijinxx; Island
- Producers: Nia Archives; Ethan P. Flynn; Jakwob; James Ford; Sampha

Nia Archives chronology
Silence Is Loud (2024)	Emotional Junglist (2026)

Singles from Emotional Junglist
- 1. "Danger" Released: 26 March 2026; 2. "Boys in Blue" Released: 29 April 2026; 3. "Vertical" Released: 4 June 2026; 4. "Get Me Down" Released: 10 July 2026

Emotional Junglist is the second studio album by the English record producer, DJ, and singer-songwriter Nia Archives, released on 17 July 2026 through Hijinxx and Island Records. It is a breakup album and contains elements of jungle, R&B, Britpop, indie pop, breakbeats, and alternative rock. Nia Archives primarily produced alongside Ethan P. Flynn and James Ford, with additional production contributions from Jakwob and Sampha. The album received generally favourable reviews from critics and topped the UK Dance Albums Chart.

== Background and release ==
Nia Archives released her debut album Silence Is Loud in 2024. Following the album, she released a remix of the PinkPantheress song "Illegal" in 2025.

Nia Archives released "Danger" as a single and music video on 26 March 2026. On 29 April 2026, she announced the album and released the single and music video, "Boys in Blue". The album's third single, "Vertical", was released on 4 June 2026 alongside a music video. "Get Me Down", featuring Jorja Smith, was released on 10 July 2026 alongside a music video.

Nia Archives explained the album's title stating: "To be an Emotional Junglist is to feel everything and nothing all at once. It's to be calm yet chaotic, sane yet manic – up, down and sideways." She cited Ray of Light by Madonna, Blur, Pulp, Saint Etienne, and Massive Attack as influences on the album. The album was written throughout a year in which she fell in love with and began a romantic relationship with a man who then broke up with her.

== Music ==
Emotional Junglist contains elements of jungle, R&B, Britpop, indie pop, breakbeats, and alternative rock. The album follows a relationship of Nia Archives's that ultimately ended in a breakup, with the first half "filled with love and the crackle of a new relationship" and the second half "deals with the fallout from an abrupt break-up".

The album opener "Feelingz Go Numb" features a jungle beat with string samples, staccato hi-hats, and a punky bassline over layered vocal loops. "Around Tha Bend" has a "surf-rock groove", "reggae inflections", and "guitar-forward production". "Danger", originally written for Rihanna, features sexually charged lyrics and incorporates elements of dancehall and industrial music. "Vertical" is a "swooning, lovesick ode" with a bridge that conjures "the matchless intensity of a burgeoning relationship". "This Could Be…" is a hopeful indie pop track featuring "fast-picked guitars and drum fills" in its instrumental. "Dance with Me 2nite" is a flirtatious orchestral pop song. "Get Me Down", featuring Jorja Smith, is "slinky and melodramatic" with "thunderous bass and subtle drum patterns". It samples tropical bird sounds from "Wind Chimes Bird and Streams", popularized by the 808 State song "Pacific State". "Train Of Thought" is a liquid drum and bass and indie pop song. "Superlust", also an indie pop song, features "sunny keys and tumbling vocals".

"Almost Always" is a ballad with a post-punk guitar line and a trap beat. "Tender" features vocals from Sampha and is an "open song of longing". Sampha originally joined the song's creation as a producer before introducing his own vocals. "Tha Darkest Hour" features an orchestral sweep and lyrics about heartbreak and emptiness. "Lovers Grief" is about heartbreak, with elements of indie rock. "Boys in Blue" recounts when her ex-boyfriend called the police on her during their breakup.

== Critical reception ==
Professional ratings
Aggregate scores
Source	Rating
Any Decent Music	7.7/10
Metacritic	80/100
Review scores
Source	Rating
AllMusic	4/5 stars
The Arts Desk	4/5 stars
Clash	8/10
DIY	4.5/5 stars
The Guardian	4/5 stars
musicOMH	4/5 stars
NME	4.5/5 stars
Pitchfork	7.9/10
The Skinny	3/5 stars
Slant	3.5/5 stars

Any Decent Music gave the album a weighted average score of 7.7 out of 10 from fourteen critic scores. According to Metacritic, it received "generally favorable" reviews based on a weighted average score of 80 out of 100 from fifteen critic scores.

Writing for The Guardian, Aimee Cliff praised the album as an "ambitiously expansive and quintessentially gen Z project that puts jungle in conversation with a myriad of other genres, weaving a narrative through them all." Will Pritchard of Pitchfork wrote that Nia Archives "accesses a new, emboldened register, and pushes jungle music into fresh, vulnerable territory" on the album. Writing for PopMatters, John Amen scored the album 9/10, writing, "Nia Archives' new album captures a gifted artist and producer as she transcends her influences, claiming and reveling in her own bewitching style". Writing for Clash, Robin Murray described the album as a "dense mosaic of sounds" with "pure and distinct" feelings. NME's Alex Rigotti wrote that Nia Archives "expands her sonic palette and bears the rawest parts of her psyche" on the album. Tara Joshi of The Observer praised the album as "ambitious" and "built on vivid storytelling and vibrant production." Calum Skuodas' review for The Skinny was critical of the album's bedroom pop sound as "a little repetitive" with "too much filler" on the album.

The album was shortlisted for the 2026 Mercury Prize.

== Track listing ==
No.	Title	Writer(s)	Producer(s)	Length
1.	"Feelingz Go Numb"	Dehaney Hunt (a.k.a. Nia Archives); James Jacob (a.k.a. Jakwob)	Nia Archives; Jakwob	2:43
2.	"Around Tha Bend"	Hunt; Ethan P. Flynn; Olivia Waithe	Nia Archives; James Ford; Flynn	2:44
3.	"Danger"	Hunt; Flynn; Waithe	Nia Archives; Flynn; Ford	2:16
4.	"Vertical"	Hunt; Flynn; Waithe	Nia Archives; Flynn; Ford	2:36
5.	"This Could Be..."	Hunt; Flynn; Ford; Waithe	Nia Archives; Flynn; Ford	3:08
6.	"Dance with Me 2nite"	Hunt; Flynn; Julia Michaels	Nia Archives; Flynn; Ford	3:27
7.	"Get Me Down" (featuring Jorja Smith)	Hunt; Flynn; Ed Thomas; Jorja Smith	Nia Archives; Flynn; Ford	3:14
8.	"Train of Thought"	Hunt; Flynn; Tove Burman	Nia Archives; Flynn; Ford	2:31
9.	"Superlust"	Hunt; Flynn; Ford; Waithe	Nia Archives; Flynn; Ford	2:15
10.	"There Goes Ma Head"	Hunt; Flynn; Ilsey Juber	Nia Archives; Flynn; Ford	2:36
11.	"Almost Always"	Hunt; Ford; Thomas	Nia Archives; Ford	2:57
12.	"Tender" (featuring Sampha)	Hunt; Flynn; Sampha Sisay	Nia Archives; Ford; Sampha	2:22
13.	"Tha Darkest Hour"	Hunt; Ford; Thomas	Nia Archives; Ford	2:30
14.	"Lovers Grief"	Hunt; Ford; Thomas	Nia Archives; Ford	2:21
15.	"Boys in Blue"	Hunt; Ford; Thomas	Nia Archives; Ford	2:33
Total length:				40:14

== Personnel ==
These credits have been adapted from Tidal.

- Nia Archives – vocals (all tracks)
- Chris Gehringer – mastering (all tracks)
- James Ford – synthesiser (tracks 1–11 and 13–15); bass, drums, guitar, programming, slide guitar (tracks 2–11 and 13–15)
- Ethan P. Flynn – background vocals (tracks 2 and 10); electric guitar (tracks 2–3, 6, and 8); programming (tracks 2–4 and 10); synthesiser (tracks 2–6, 8, and 10); recording (tracks 3, 5–6, and 10); sound design (tracks 4–5); acoustic guitar (tracks 5–6, 8, and 10); bass guitar (tracks 6 and 8), Mellotron (track 8)
- Jorja Smith – vocals (track 7)
- Sampha Sisay – vocals, piano, programming, synthesiser (track 12)
- Ed Thomas – electric guitar (track 15)
- Matt Karmil – mixing (tracks 1–2, 4–5, and 7–14)
- Tom Norris – mixing (tracks 3, 6, and 15)
- Victor Verpillat – engineering assistance, mixing (tracks 3, 6, 15)

== Charts ==
Chart performance for Emotional Junglist
Chart (2026)	Peak position
Scottish Albums (Official Charts)	21
UK Albums (Official Charts)	30
UK Dance Albums (Official Charts)	1
