= Nia Archives =

English record producer, DJ and songwriter

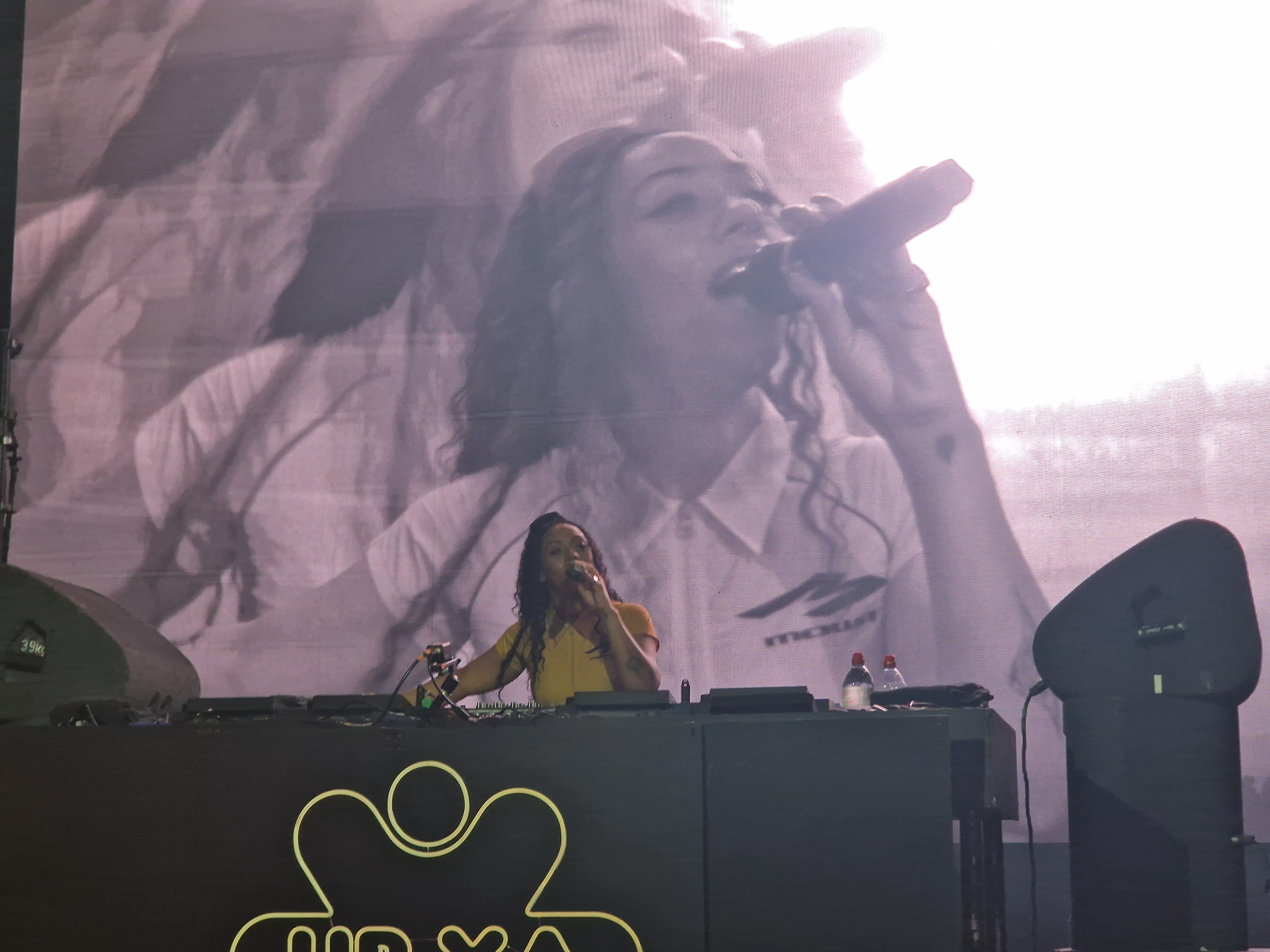
- Nia Archives playing in Amsterdam in the Netherlands on 16 November 2024

Background information
- Born: Dehaney Nia Lishahn Hunt; September 1999 (age 26); Bradford, West Yorkshire, England
- Genres: Jungle; drum and bass
- Occupations: Record producer; DJ; songwriter
- Years active: 2020–present
- Labels: Hijinxx; Island
- Website: niaarchives.com

Dehaney Nia Lishahn Hunt (born September 1999), known professionally as Nia Archives, is an English record producer, DJ, singer and songwriter. Born in Bradford in West Yorkshire, she moved to Leeds aged seven, out of the family home aged sixteen, and then to Greater Manchester, during which time she was inspired by jungle documentaries and the women within them.

After moving to Hackney Wick for university, Hunt attracted attention for the self-released EPs Headz Gone West (2021), Forbidden Feelingz (2022) and Sunrise Bang Ur Head Against the Wall (2023), the latter of which topped the UK Dance Albums Chart. Hunt released her debut album Silence Is Loud in 2024 through Island, which peaked at No. 16 on the UK Albums Chart.

Hunt is generally regarded as being at the forefront of the post-2020 drum and bass revival.

== Life and career ==
=== 1999–2019: Early life ===
Dehaney Nia Lishahn Hunt was born in Bradford, West Yorkshire in September 1999, and has two brothers. When she was seven, they moved to Leeds. Hunt never met her father, and he is not listed on her birth certificate. Her ex-stepfather, a former producer and rapper, had a dancehall radio show on a Bradford radio station, and set up a studio in her house, where local MCs such as Lunar C would visit to make music, introducing her to Logic Pro when she was twelve. Hunt is a third-generation Windrush immigrant; her grandmother Liz had moved to Bradford from Jamaica at age fourteen, and with one of her four sisters ran a pirate radio station. Their large afros earned them the nickname "The Bradford 5" after The Jackson 5. She also owned a sound system and used it to soundtrack family gatherings with tracks by Goldie, Roni Size, Shy FX, and assorted gospel, soul and R&B, and introduced Hunt to successful women of colour such as M.I.A., Jennifer Lara, and Ms. Dynamite. She also ran a community school, where Hunt first learned about Black history, which she was not taught at school; Hunt subsequently moved her Year 3 teacher to tears by giving a presentation on Rosa Parks.

As a child, Hunt was a studious reader, and began taking photographs and making films on a Handycam gifted to her by her grandfather. Her first introduction to music was the gospel music her Pentecostal church played, and the first CD she bought was Rihanna's Music of the Sun. She realised she wanted to be a singer aged eight, though spent time also wanting to be an archaeologist. Aged twelve, she became a fan of Emeli Sandé after listening to her drum and bass song "Heaven", although did not discover the name of its genre until later. Family issues caused her to move out of her family home when she was sixteen, and she moved solo to another area of Leeds, before moving to Bury, Greater Manchester, and then to a hostel in Radcliffe, Greater Manchester, where she had a social worker and spent time claiming unemployment benefits before taking up posts at KFC and as a cookery teacher.

Around this time, she found her interest in photography revived after she went down digital rabbit holes, and watched documentaries like the LTJ Bukem film Modern Times (1996), the Talkin' Headz (1998) Metalheadz documentary, and Channel 4's film, All Junglists: A London Somet'ing Dis (1994), taking particular interest in the role of women in the scene such as Kemistry & Storm and DJ Flight. Mainstream clubs were not open to her as she did not have ID, so she made friends during this period by attending squat raves and underground house parties, using her Handycam to strike up conversations. In 2017, to accompany the videos she was creating, and as an outlet for the emotions she was feeling, she downloaded a bootleg version of Logic Pro, having become fed up by the way local producers were treating her; finding herself speeding her music up, she discovered she was making jungle after researching its roots.

=== 2019–2022: Early works, Headz Gone West, and Forbidden Feelingz ===
Her early works were uploaded to SoundCloud under the name Indigo D. After finding herself in a toxic relationship in Manchester, she worked sixty-hour weeks at KFC to save for a move to London, and in 2019, she enrolled on a course at CM, which had a music production and business course in partnership with the University of Westminster, and moved to a warehouse in Hackney Wick next to a glass factory, which she initially paid for using a part-time job in Wetherspoons. One of her tutors on her course was Jason Alexander, a former acid house DJ under the name Warlock, who encouraged her to apply for DJ Flight's EQ50 Mentorship Scheme, a twelve-month mentorship for five womxn, at which she found herself working with V Recordings and mentored by DJ Flight herself.

In 2020, she sent her track "Sober Feels" to all of the local jungle and drum and bass labels in the area. Finding that none of the local labels were interested, she released it herself, using the name Nia Archives, and on her own label Hijinxx; both were nods to her videography, and the latter was named after a move by her stepfather's favourite skater. After she spent £500 of her student finance on digital advertising for it, the song became popular with Britons who were unable to go out, and by May 2023, the song had been streamed over 7,000,000 times. The success of the song enabled Hunt to drop out of her course. In April 2021, she released the single "Headz Gone West", followed by an EP of the same name, both of which took their title from her poor mental health during lockdown; the former was written as the second track for the project, after "Sober Feels", and in an interview with Complex Networks, she noted that the EP comprised extrapolations of beats she had produced during nights.

She then collaborated with Rebel MC on a remix of Lava La Rue's "Magpie", and in October 2021, she released "Forbidden Feelingz", which sampled Columbo, a murder detective series, in tribute to Liz, and which was accompanied by a music video directed by Delphino. She then released "18 & Over", which sampled Cocoa Tea's "Young Lover", alongside a video that referenced Babylon and The Harder They Come and was directed by Taliable, the production alias of Talia Beale; in a March 2022 interview with Dazed, she noted that she picked the sample after hearing discovering her stepfather's SoundCloud account and finding it on there. In February 2022, she released "Luv Like", a song about her own body dysmorphic disorder, which was released alongside a music video, and the following month she released the EP Forbidden Feelingz, which included "Forbidden Feelingz", "18 & Over", and "Luv Like".

=== 2022–2023: MOBO Award and Sunrise Bang Ur Head Against The Wall ===
In April 2022, she published a handwritten open letter to the MOBO Awards to introduce an Electronic/Dance category, on the grounds that the last such act to win an award was Goldie, who had won for Timeless in 1996; the Nova Twins had put in a similar request the year before for a Rock/Alternative category, but had been unsuccessful. However, on this occasion, Hunt's request was entertained; working alongside the newly-formed Black Electronic Music Association, or Club BEMA, such a category was created for that year's ceremony, which was won by Hunt. She then collaborated with Watch the Ride on "Mash Up the Dance", and Clipz, Beenie Man, Cristale and ShaSimone on "No Time". In September 2022, she released "Baianá", which sampled the traditional Brazilian choir Barbatuques, alongside a video shot in Brazil. In November 2022, she released "So Tell Me...", a song about her decision to leave home, which was released alongside a video produced by Dan Emmerson, and the following month, she released "Conveniency", which alongside "Baianá" and "So Tell Me..." appeared on her EP Sunrise Bang Ur Head Against tha Wall in March. She released a remix EP, Sunrise Bang Ur Head Against tha Wall (Remixes), that May.

In June, she supported Beyoncé on her Renaissance World Tour at Tottenham Hotspur Stadium; she told The Face in February 2024 that she had only discovered she would be performing there on the day, and that she had received "a lot" of abuse for playing jungle. Alexis Petridis noted in April 2024 that cameraphone footage for the gig indicated an audience looking like jungle was "the last thing they want to hear", but opined that her slot was indicative of her success. A week after playing the gig, she released "Off Wiv Ya Headz", a remix of the Yeah Yeah Yeahs' 2009 single "Heads Will Roll", and a week after that she released a remix of Jorja Smith's "Little Things". In August 2023, she released "Bad Gyalz", a song about the women who attended her raves, and which featured vocals from MC Moose and production from Clipz and was accompanied by a video directed by Beale; she, Central Cee, and Kano then featured on a JD Sports Christmas advert, and she then released a remix of Fred Again's "Leavemealone".

=== 2024–2025: Silence is Loud ===
In January 2024, she released "Crowded Roomz", a combination of jungle and indie rock co-written and co-produced by Ethan P. Flynn and about her experience of being surrounded by people while touring but still feeling unable to be herself; its music video featured Maverick Sabre, who had previously featured on her Sunrise Bang Ur Head Against tha Wall track "No Need 2 Be Sorry, Call Me?", and Corbin Shaw. The following month, she announced her debut album, Silence Is Loud, which was also co-written and co-produced by Flynn, and released its title track, an ode to her love for her brother. The album comprised her attempt at fusing jungle with Britpop, on the grounds that she had not heard the genre in dance music before. She then collaborated with Shaw to release "Cheese Chips N Bloody Gravy", a piece of merchandise, and then in March 2024 she released "Unfinished Business", about a current partner's feelings for their past. Silence is Loud was released on 12 April 2024, and featured "Silence is Loud", "Crowded Roomz", "Unfinished Business", and "So Tell Me..." and "Forbidden Feelingz" from previous EPs; the album charted at No. 16 on the UK Albums Chart and was nominated for that year's Mercury Prize.

=== 2025–present: Up Ya Archives and Emotional Junglist ===
Hunt revealed the creation of her new record label, Up Ya Archives, on 24 April 2025, with a focus on "everything new gen junglism" and debuting with her single "Get Loose" that same day in collaboration with Bristol artist Cheetah. She also started hosting the weekly Up Ya Archives radio program on NTS the following day.

She released her single "Danger" on 27 March 2026. On 29 April, she announced her second album Emotional Junglist and released the single "Boys in Blue". The album's third single, "Vertical" released on 4 June 2026. Emotional Junglist released on 17 July 2026.

== Artistry ==
"I've been massively inspired by Burial when it comes to my own music – I'm literally obsessed with him, it's unhealthy! I follow the subreddit and I'm deep in the Burial world; I've got a massive poster of the Untrue artwork on my wall. But I would say he's been a massive inspiration just because, for me as a producer, I look at him as a great case study of somebody who chose to be anonymous and didn't reveal so much about himself publicly. But if you listen to his music, you can find out so much about his personality: what he likes and what he's into… video games, films and just his own personal music preferences. I really like that he details his personality within the production without actually saying things in words. You just need to listen to get an idea of who he is."

— Hunt in November 2022

When producing, Hunt takes inspiration from the classic era of jungle, between 1992 and 1996. She is massively inspired by Burial; in an interview with Crack in November 2022, she stated that she first discovered his album Untrue (2007) when she was "17 or 18" and listened to the album on loop after moving to London, that she submitted an essay about him while at university, that she was specifically inspired by the personality he put into his work, and that she was inspired to sample Columbo and "Young Lover" on "Forbidden Feelingz" and "18 & Over" by him. In an interview with the BBC in January 2023, she stated that she was inspired by Maya Angelou's conversion of pain into poetry; she first became interested in her via Liz's community school, would refer frequently to her memoir I Know Why the Caged Bird Sings as a child, and would sample her poem And Still I Rise on her Forbidden Feelingz album track "Ode 2 Maya Angelou". In addition, the songwriting on Silence Is Loud took inspiration from The Beatles, Blur, and Oasis.

Reviewing Forbidden Feelingz, Pitchfork described her voice as "indebted to the jazzy licks of Erykah Badu and Nina Simone", and with "a soulful lilt and lyrics from the sunnier sides of reggae music". In June 2023, Gauchoworld described Hunt, Piri & Tommy, and PinkPantheress as "at the forefront of the "bedroom rave" movement", and in September 2023, Clash described her as one of the leaders of the post-2020 drum and bass revival alongside Venbee, Charlotte Plank, and Piri, the last of whom used a January 2024 The Guardian piece to state that the success of both Archives and Yunè Pinku was inspirational in her choosing to become a producer herself. Additionally, Alexis Petridis used a Silence is Loud review to observe that Hunt occupied a "roughly equivalent" position to Goldie, a 1990s jungle musician, describing both as a "striking, charismatic figurehead for a genre traditionally lacking in striking, charismatic figures", and that on Silence is Loud, Hunt was "unafraid to tether her breakbeats to a pounding four-to-the-floor kick drum, a move that would have been absolutely verboten in 90s jungle"; he also noted that Forbidden Feelingz and Sunrise Bang Ur Head Against tha Wall posited Hunt as a "weightier counterpoint" to the works of PinkPantheress.

== Discography ==
=== Studio albums ===
List of albums, with selected details
Title	Album details	Peak chart positions	
Title	Album details	UK	UK Dance
Silence Is Loud	Released: 12 April 2024; Label: Island, Hijinxx; Format: Cassette, CD, digital download, LP, streaming	16	1
Emotional Junglist	Released: 17 July 2026; Label: Island, Hijinxx; Format: Cassette, CD, digital download, LP, streaming	30	1

=== Extended plays ===
List of extended plays, with selected chart positions
Title	Details	Peak chart positions
Title	Details	UK Dance
Headz Gone West	Released: 28 April 2021; Format: Streaming, digital download; Label: Hijinxx	—
Forbidden Feelingz	Released: 10 March 2022; Format: Streaming, digital download, LP, cassette; Label: Hijinxx	—
Sunrise Bang Ur Head Against tha Wall	Released: 10 March 2023; Format: Streaming, digital download, LP; Label: Hijinxx	1
Sunrise Bang Ur Head Against tha Wall (Remixes)	Released: 12 May 2023; Format: Streaming, digital download, LP; Label: Hijinxx	—
"—" denotes a recording that did not chart or was not released in that territory.

=== Singles ===
Title	Year	Peak chart positions			Certifications	Album/EP
Title	Year	UK Dance	UK Down.	NZ Hot	Certifications	Album/EP
"Sober Feels"	2020	—	—	—		Headz Gone West
"Don't Kid Urself"	2020	—	—	—		Headz Gone West
"Headz Gone West"	2021	—	—	—		Headz Gone West
"Forbidden Feelingz"	2021	—	—	—	BPI: Silver	Forbidden Feelingz
"18 & Over"	2021	—	—	—		Forbidden Feelingz
"Luv Like"	2022	—	—	—		Forbidden Feelingz
"Mash Up the Dance" (with Watch the Ride)	2022	—	—	—		Non-album singles
"No Time" (with CLIPZ and Beenie Man featuring Cristale and ShaSimone)	2022	—	—	—		Non-album singles
"Baianá"	2022	40	—	—	BPI: Silver	Sunrise Bang Ur Head Against tha Wall
"So Tell Me..."	2022	—	89	—		Sunrise Bang Ur Head Against tha Wall
"Conveniency"	2023	—	—	29		Sunrise Bang Ur Head Against tha Wall
"Off Wiv Ya Headz"	2023	—	—	—		Non-album singles
"Bad Gyalz"	2023	—	—	18		Non-album singles
"Crowded Roomz"	2024	—	—	25		Silence Is Loud
"Silence Is Loud"	2024	—	—	—		Silence Is Loud
"Unfinished Business"	2024	—	—	—		Silence Is Loud
"Cards On The Table"	2024	—	—	—		Silence Is Loud
"Get Loose" (with Cheetah)	2025	—	—	—		Non-album singles
"Maia Maia" (with Clipz)	2025	—	—	—		Non-album singles
"Danger"	2026	—	—	—		Emotional Junglist
"Boys in Blue"	2026	—	—	—		Emotional Junglist
"Vertical"	2026	—	—	—		Emotional Junglist
"Get Me Down" (featuring Jorja Smith)	2026	—	—	—		Emotional Junglist
"—" denotes a recording that did not chart or was not released in that territory.

=== Guest appearances ===
Title	Year	Other artist(s)	Album
"Move On"	2021	Zeitgeist	Future Symptoms, Vol. 1
"The Now"	2021	Chimpo, Abnormal Sleepz	Outside
"Setting"	2021	Reek0	Good Dreams
"Consume Me"	2021	none	Beautiful Presents: Beautiful Vol. 1
"Patience"	2022	Mall Grab	What I Breathe

=== Remixes ===
Title	Year	Original artist(s)
"Blue Denim Jeans" (Nia Archives Remix)	2021	p-rallel, Lauren Faith
"Magpie" (Nia Archives Remix) (featuring Phoebs and Congo Natty)	2021	Lava La Rue
"Monarchy" (Nia Archives Remix)	2021	Lucy Tun
"Nineteen" (Nia Archives Remix)	2022	PinkPantheress
"Where Are You Now" (Nia Archives Remix)	2022	Danny L Harle, DJ Danny
"Burn Dem Bridges" (Nia Archives Edit)	2022	Skin On Skin
"Little Things" (Nia Archives Remix)	2023	Jorja Smith
"Leavemealone" (Nia Archives Remix)	2023	Fred Again, Baby Keem
"Waited All Night" (Nia Archives Remix) (featuring Romy and Oliver Sim)	2024	Jamie xx
"Illegal" (Nia Archives Remix)	2025	PinkPantheress

== Awards and nominations ==
Award	Year	Category	Nominated work	Result	Ref.
BBC Music Introducing	2022	Artist of the Year	Nia Archives	Won	
BBC Sound of...	2023	BBC Sound of 2023	Nia Archives	Third	
Brit Awards	2023	Rising Star	Nia Archives	Nominated	
DJ Mag	2022	Best Breakthrough DJ	Nia Archives	Won	
Mercury Prize	2024	Best Album	Silence Is Loud	Nominated	
Mercury Prize	2026	Best Album	Emotional Junglist	TBA	
MOBO Awards	2022	Best Newcomer	Nia Archives	Nominated	
MOBO Awards	2022	Best Dance/Electronic Act	Nia Archives	Won	
MOBO Awards	2023	Best Dance/Electronic Act	Nia Archives	Nominated	
NME Awards	2022	Best Producer	Nia Archives	Won	
UK Music Video Awards	2024	Best Colour Grading in a Video – Newcomer	"Unfinished Business"	Nominated	
