= List of EMI Records artists =

The following artists (musicians or bands) have had releases with EMI Records (formerly Virgin EMI Records). This list is not for artists who have recorded solely under the Virgin Records label or the original EMI Records label that existed from 1973 to 2012.

== 0-9 ==
- 2 Chainz
- 6ix9ine

== A ==
- Ai
- Alessia Cara
- Alesso
- Alice Chater
- Alice Glass
- Alison Wonderland
- Amber Mark
- Aminé
- Amy Macdonald
- Anthonia Edwards
- Anthony Ramos
- Arlissa
- Astrid S
- Avenged Sevenfold

== B ==
- Banks
- Barns Courtney
- Bastille
- Beck
- Benny Blanco
- Berhana
- Beth Ditto
- Bishop Briggs
- Black Sabbath
- Blossoms
- Bree Runway

== C ==
- Calum Scott
- Mori Calliope
- Carrie Underwood
- Chantel Jeffries
- Chase & Status
- Chvrches
- Cold War Kids

== D ==
- David Zowie
- December 10
- Desiigner
- Devo (UK/Europe only)
- Donna Missal
- Duke Dumont

== E ==
- Eden
- Elkie Brooks
- Elton John
- Emeli Sandé
- Empire of the Sun

== F ==
- Fall Out Boy
- Fangclub
- Fletcher
- Florence and the Machine
- Four of Diamonds

== G ==
- Genesis
- Geordie
- George Michael
- Gorgon City
- Greta Van Fleet

== H ==
- Halsey
- Hardwell
- Hardy Caprio
- Hayden James
- Hey Violet
- Hrvy

== I ==
- Incubus
- Isaac Gracie

== J ==
- Jamie T
- Jamiroquai
- Jasmin Walia
- Jay Pryor
- Jen & Liv
- Jess Glynne
- Jessie Ware
- Jon Bellion
- Jonas Blue

== K ==
- Kali Uchis
- Katy Perry
- Keith Richards
- Kid Crème
- Krept and Konan
- KT Tunstall

== L ==
- Lancey Foux
- Lethal Bizzle
- Lewis Capaldi
- LCD Soundsystem
- Logic
- Loyle Carner

== M ==
- Mabel
- Mae Stephens
- Maejor
- Marika Hackman
- Mark Knopfler
- Martin Solveig
- Massive Attack
- Maty Noyes
- Metallica
- Michael Fortunati
- Mika
- Mike Oldfield
- MisterWives
- MNEK
- MoStack

== N ==
- Naughty Boy
- New Hope Club
- NF
- Niall Horan

== O ==
- Offaiah
- Olivia O'Brien
- Olly Murs
- Only The Poets

== P ==
- Paul Heaton & Jacqui Abbott
- Pearl Jam
- Peter Gabriel
- Pretty Vicious
- Pusha T

== Q ==
- Queen (excluding United States and Canada)
- Queen Naija

== R ==
- Radwimps
- Rise Against
- Ryan Adams
- Ryan Beatty
- Ruth Lorenzo

== S ==
- Sam Smith
- Sandro Cavazza
- Sagarika Mukherjee Da Costa
- Seeb
- Seinabo Sey
- SG Lewis
- Shaan
- Shania Twain
- Shawn Mendes
- Sneakbo
- Steve Perry
- Sub Focus
- Swedish House Mafia

== T ==
- Taylor Swift
- The Beaches
- The Chemical Brothers
- The Killers
- The Libertines
- The Preatures
- The Pretty Reckless
- The Stone Roses
- The Vamps
- Thirdstory
- Thunderpussy
- Tion Wayne
- Timi Dakolo
- Tory Lanez
- Trap Beckham
- Trippie Redd

== U ==
- UB40

== V ==
- Vera Blue
- Vic Mensa
- Vince Staples

== W ==
- Wes Nelson
- Westlife
- Wilkinson

== X ==
- X-Ray Spex

== Y ==
- YG

== Z ==
- Zutomayo
