= Octo Octa =

American house producer and DJ

Maya Bouldry-Morrison
- Born: May 13, 1987 (age 39); Chicago, Illinois, United States
- Occupations: DJ; record producer
- Labels: T4T Luv Nrg; 100% Silk; Argot; Deepblak Recordings; Frendzone; Love Notes; Low income $quad; Running Back; Skylax Records
- Website: octoocta.bandcamp.com

Maya Bouldry-Morrison (born 13 May 1987), better known by her stage name Octo Octa, is an American house producer and DJ based in New Hampshire.

In 2016, Bouldry-Morrison came out as transgender, after having already gained prominence as an artist.

== Career ==
Octo Octa describes her influences as including classic Warp records, IDM, drum 'n' bass, San Francisco based label Tigerbeat6, and has been inspired by trans artist DJ Sprinkles.

While studying at the University of New Hampshire, she formed the dance band Horny Vampyre with her friend Jeremy, while also using the Octo Octa moniker for her solo experimental music. Her initial solo productions worked within IDM and breakcore genres; it was only at the end of her college career that she began to produce the style of house music for which she is more widely known.

Her first EP release, Let Me See You (2011), came out through 100% Silk, the house sub-label of noise music label Not Not Fun Records. She has since had several releases, including the 12" EP Where Did You Go / Through the Haze (2014) on Argot, More Times EP (2015) on German label Running Back and Further Trips (2015) through Deepblak. Her first three albums have been released through 100% Silk, with the most recent being Resonant Body in 2019.

In 2019, Bouldry-Morrison announced the formation of a new record label, T4T Luv Nrg, with her partner, fellow DJ Eris Drew. Under the T4T Luv Nrg banner, the two have performed shows and gone on club tours together. Bouldry-Morrison released her EP She’s Calling on February 5, 2021. Her album Sigils for Survival released on April 30, 2026. She formed Alchemical Sisters, a duo with Eris Drew, in 2026; their debut self-titled album released on October 18, 2026.

== Personal life ==
Bouldry-Morrison came out as transgender in 2016. She recounts that this process began in 2012, when she read a Rolling Stone article about Against Me frontwoman Laura Jane Grace.

== Discography ==
=== Albums ===
- Rough, Rugged, and Raw, 100% Silk, 2011, SILK025
- LA Vampires, 100% Silk, 2012, SILK031
- Between Two Selves, 100% Silk, 2013, SILK046
- Where Are We Going?, HNYTRX, 2017, HNY-015
- Resonant Body, T4T Luv Nrg, 2019, T4T002
- Sigils for Survival, T4T Luv Nrg, 2026
- Alchemical Sisters (with Eris Drew, as Alchemical Sisters), Interdimensional Transmissions, 2026, IT 57

=== 12"s and EPs ===
- Let Me See You, 100% Silk, 2011, SILK011
- Oh Love, 100% Silk, 2012, SILK023
- Cause I Love You, 100% Silk, 2014, SILK061
- Where Did You Go/ Through the Haze, Argot, 2014, ARGOT 009
- More Times, Running Back, 2015, RB052
- Requiem for the Body, Stays Underground It Pays, 2015, SUIT 8
- Further Trips, Deepblak, 2015, DBR-V026
- Where Are We Going?, HNYTRX, 2017, HNY-015
- My Feelings Toward You, Love Notes, 2017, LVNO-09
- Frndzne 01, Frendzone!, 2017, frndzne 01
- New Paths, Argot, 2017, ARGOT019
- Aimless, Skylax, 2017, LAX144
- Adrift, Honey Soundsystem Records, 2017, HNY-016
- Devotion EP (with Eris Drew), Naive, 2018, NAIVE004
- For Lovers Technicolour, 2019, TCLR030
- She's Calling, T4T Luv Nrg, 2021, T4T004
- Day After A Night With U / Stars & Water (with Eris Drew), fabric Originals, 2022, FRO001
- Dreams Of A Dancefloor, T4T Luv Nrg, 2023, T4T011

=== Remixes ===
- Don't Fear It EP Don't Fear It (Remix), Shewey Trax, 2017, shew-19

=== DJ Mixes ===
- Silk Road Mix, 100% Silk, 2012
- Fabric Presents Octo Octa & Eris Drew (with Eris Drew), Fabric (2), 2020, FABRIC207
- Love Hypnosis Vol. 1, T4T Luv Nrg, 2020, T4T003
- Love Hypnosis Vol. 2, T4T Luv Nrg, 2022, T4T008
