= Ratbag (musician) =

New Zealand musician and visual artist

ratbag
- Born: Sophie Brown
- Origin: Auckland, New Zealand
- Genres: Alternative rock; art pop; shoegaze; grunge; punk
- Occupations: Singer, songwriter, visual artist
- Years active: 2021–present
- Label: Mischief
- Website: worldofratbag.com

Sophie Brown (born 2003), known mononymously as ratbag, is a New Zealand musician and multimedia artist. Active since 2021, her music draws influence from grunge, shoegaze, punk, and pop, and often features surreal horror-inspired visuals centered on a fictional cartoon band of monsters, which she depicts in various artistic mediums. After building a following on TikTok, Brown released her debut EP, why aren't you laughing?, in December 2023.

== Early life ==
Originally from Auckland, New Zealand, Brown drew art from a young age, and was a fan of horror films growing up. She received her first guitar at age 7 as a Christmas present, but did not pursue music until age 15, when she began writing songs in her bedroom on her father's ukulele.

== Career ==
Brown began making art and music as ratbag in 2021. In Australia and New Zealand, ratbag is a common slang term for a mischievous child, which Brown has said she was often labeled growing up. After building an audience on TikTok with a series of surreal multimedia art, she released her first single as ratbag, "rats in my walls", in July 2023. A second single, "exit girl", was released the following September with an accompanying music video. Both singles were included on ratbag's debut EP, why aren't you laughing?, released 8 December 2023.

== Artistry ==
Brown's music incorporates elements of punk, shoegaze, grunge, pop, art pop, and alternative rock. Her musical influences include Pixies, Broken Social Scene, David Bowie, Declan McKenna, and Billie Eilish. Brown has said she enjoys experimenting with sounds in her music: "I like to take normal sounds and make them really weird – I’m really into reversing. I like mucking around with the little pieces of vocals and cutting it up. It’s almost like I’m dissecting things in my computer."

The music of ratbag is often accompanied by surrealist drawings and animations created by Brown. These typically feature her fictional band of animated monsters: Deemo, a devil-like bassist; Fritz, a crocodile-clown hybrid keyboardist; Slug, a guitarist in a mohawked bird mask; and Eugene, a purple octopus-headed drummer. According to Brown, each of the four monsters represents a different part of her personality. These visual elements have been compared to those of Gorillaz, Dethklok, the children's book Where the Wild Things Are, and the art of comic book writer Neil Gaiman. Brown herself has cited Jack Stauber, the shows Don't Hug Me I'm Scared and Adventure Time, and A24-produced horror films like Midsommar and Hereditary as inspiring the visual and narrative aspects of her work.

Brown has a substantial following on TikTok, where she posts digital art and stop motion animations of her "band" and the story surrounding them, as well as showcasing her love of sculpture, claymation, photography, fashion, and other artistic mediums.

== Discography ==
=== Extended plays ===
List of EPs, with release date and label shown
Title	EP details
Why Aren't You Laughing?	Released: 7 December 2023; Label: Mischief, Universal New Zealand; Formats: Vinyl, digital download, streaming
Kissing Under an (almost) Full Moon	Released: 8 May 2025; Label: Mischief, Universal New Zealand; Formats: Digital download, streaming
