= Mild Orange =

New Zealand rock and pop band

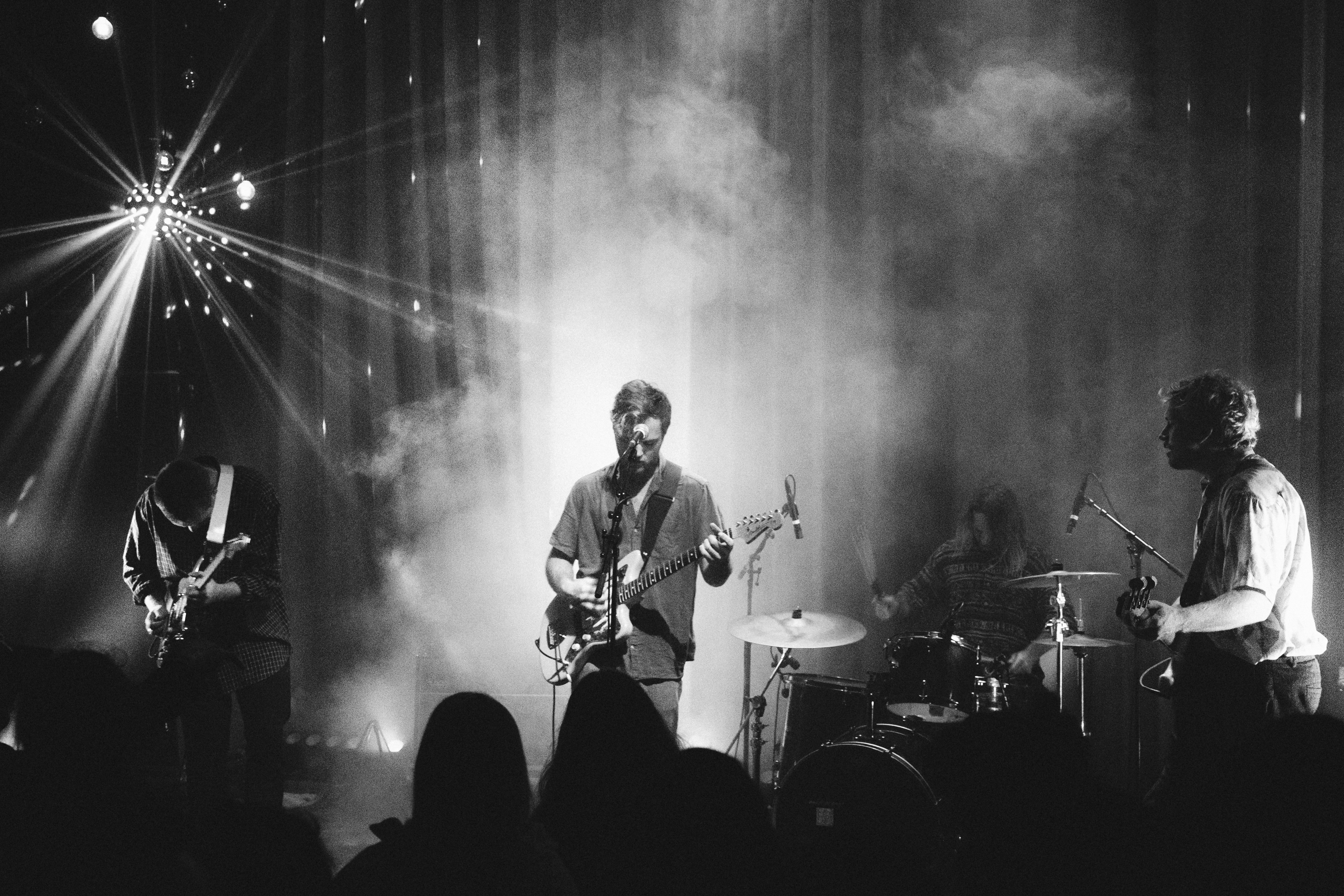
- Mild Orange performing in Baden, Switzerland in 2019. Left to right: Josh Reid, Josh Mehrtens, Jack Ferguson, Tom Kelk

Background information
- Origin: Dunedin, Otago, N.Z.
- Genres: Dream pop, indie rock, psychedelic rock
- Years active: 2016–present
- Labels: Independent, AWAL, ONErpm
- Members: Josh Mehrtens; Josh Reid; Tom Kelk; Jack Ferguson
- Website: www.mildorange.com

Mild Orange is a New Zealand dream pop and indie rock band formed in Dunedin, Otago, in 2016. The band is composed of four friends, Josh Mehrtens (vocals, lyrics, guitar, production, mixing, art), Josh Reid (lead guitar), Tom Kelk (bass guitar), and Jack Ferguson (drums), who met while studying at the University of Otago.

Mild Orange has written and released four albums together. Their first album, Foreplay, was released independently in April 2018 and was received positively by critics. The single "Some Feeling" has achieved over 27 million views on YouTube. Their second album, a self-titled, was released independently on 29 May 2020 and received positively by critics. The video for their single "Freak In Me", released on 12 March 2020, has attracted over 6.7 million views on YouTube. Their third album, Looking For Space, was released in early 2022. In August 2025, the album “The//Glow” was released.

== History ==
=== 2016–2018: Formation and Foreplay ===
Mild Orange originates from Dunedin, New Zealand. The band was originally formed by early childhood friends Josh Mehrtens and Josh Reid who met in kindergarten and by chance met again in university, and later joined by Tom Kelk and Jack Ferguson. According to the band, the name Mild Orange was chosen because "the colour orange can cause one to experience a heightened sense of optimism, a boost in aspiration, and a stimulation of warmth and happiness".

The songs on their debut album had their beginnings in 2016 when Mehrtens and Reid found themselves living together in a ten-person flat in Dunedin and spending many nights together writing music. Mehrtens then spent another six months recording the vocals and mixing in Arrowtown and Dunedin. Mehrtens had little previous experience recording or mixing and admitted that there were times he doubted his own experience and abilities.

Their debut album, Foreplay was released on 28 April 2018. Foreplay was both independently produced and published, and it was released mainly in digital media. It was critically acclaimed for its "introspective nature", and "soothing guitar melodies": The record's style was described as "psychedelic" and full of "optimistic but introspective guitar-driven tunes", and "an experimental, mellow and decidedly ambient sound. It's very relaxing and uplifting. A sound that is most definitely unconventional and has an Indie soft rock vibe." Sam Fraser-Baxter from Hello Zukeen Magazine said "Foreplay is a thoroughly introspective album. It’s an honest exploration of love and loss. By the time I’d arrived home and had finished Foreplay, I had felt a lot. The album’s honest exploration of emotion, inspires it. You can’t ask for much more from any album."

During 2018 they sold out their album release tour of New Zealand with stops in Wellington, Auckland, Christchurch and two shows in Dunedin.

=== 2020: Mild Orange ===
Their self-titled album, was released 29 May 2020. It currently features the singles "Freak in Me," "Making Things," and "First Taste."

=== 2022: Looking for Space ===
The band's third studio album Looking for Space was released on 10 February 2022.

=== 2025: The//Glow ===
The band's fourth studio album The//Glow released on 8 August 2025.

== Discography ==
=== Albums ===
List of albums, with release date and label shown
Title	Details
Foreplay	Released: 18 April 2018; Format: LP, Digital download, streaming; Label: Mild Orange
Mild Orange	Released: 29 May 2020; Format: LP, Digital download, streaming; Label: Mild Orange
Looking for Space	Released: 10 February 2022; Format: LP, Digital download, streaming; Label: Mild Orange
The//Glow	Release date: 8 August 2025; Format: LP, Digital download, streaming; Label: A Band Called Mild Orange
