= Hana Vu =

American singer-songwriter

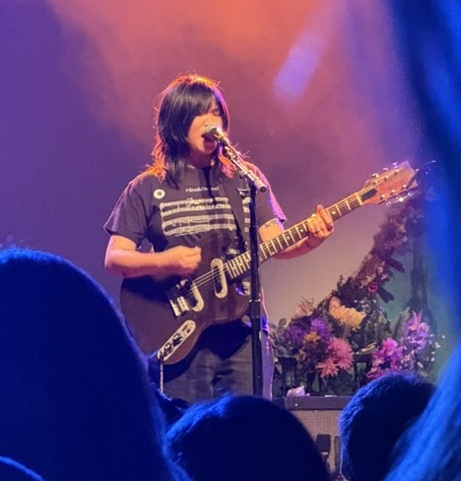
- Hana Vu in 2025

Background information
- Born: 2000 (age 24–25)
- Origin: Los Angeles, California, US
- Instruments: Vocals; guitar
- Labels: Luminelle Recordings
- Website: hanavu.com

Hana Vu (born 2000) is an American singer-songwriter from Los Angeles, California. She is of Vietnamese and Korean descent. Vu began writing songs as a child and started performing around L.A. by the age of 14, eventually opening for bands like Soccer Mommy and Wet. After sharing music for several years on SoundCloud and Bandcamp, she released her self-produced debut EP How Many Times Have You Driven By (2018) at the age of 17. It was released through Fat Possum imprint, Luminelle Recordings. Prior to the EP she had collaborated with Willow Smith on the track "Queen of High School". In 2019 Vu released the double EP Nicole Kidman / Anne Hathaway, named after her two favourite actresses. The EP cover features a painting Vu did of Anne Hathaway accepting an award that she later distorted to mimic plastic melting. The same year she was included in The NME 100: Essential new artists for 2019 credited with "[t]earing up diary scribbles and mangling them into a scrunch of daydreaming indie rock." Following graduation from high school, Vu moved out of her parents' house and resides in the Echo Park area of Los Angeles.

== Discography ==
=== Studio albums ===
- How Many Times Have You Driven By (2018)
- Nicole Kidman / Anne Hathaway (2019)
- Public Storage (2021)
- Romanticism (2024)

=== Mixtapes ===
- Sensitive (2016)

=== EPs ===
- OUTTAKES (2015)
- Parking Lot (2022)
- Movies (2025)
