= Red Leather (musician) =

Musical artist from Reno, Nevada

- Born: Reno, Nevada, U.S.
- Origin: Los Angeles, California
- Genres: Alt-rock; folk rock; pop-punk; alt-pop
- Instruments: Singing vocals; acoustic guitar; electric guitar
- Years active: 2022–present
- Website: https://red-leather.com

Red Leather is a country and rock singer-songwriter from Reno, Nevada. He plays guitar and sings. His first single, titled "The Only Time It Rains In Hollywood", was released in 2022, with several other singles following. His debut album, titled Reno, was released on November 17, 2023. His second album called Tahoe was released on February 27, 2026.

He is a very private person, never revealing his face, legal name, or age. He is a recovering addict, being addicted to several drugs (including alcohol), particularly cocaine. In October 2023 he was reported sober for 20 months. He currently resides in Los Angeles.

== Personal life ==
Not much is known about Red's early life besides his place of birth. Most of what is known is implied through his music, social media, or interviews.

Red always had an interest in music, learning to play guitar and sing, which he used as an escape from reality. He played in several bands in his teens.

Sometime in his early life, Red developed an addiction to alcohol and cocaine.

In 2021, Red moved to Los Angeles.

=== Suicide attempt ===
In 2021, Red Leather got into a "dark place" and climbed the stairs to the roof of a building in downtown LA. When he was on the roof, he looked at his phone and saw he had 1% battery left. He then made a phone call to a friend, who he describes as an angel. His friend picked him up, saving his life. He wrote the songs "Sins" and recently, “Last Call” about this event.

=== Heart attack and overdose ===
In December 2021, after being sober for an unknown amount of time, Red Leather relapsed on drugs and had a heart attack.

Shortly after, on January 5, 2022, Red Leather drove drunk in Las Vegas before returning to his hotel and overdosing. This event inspired the song "Bury Me In Vegas".

=== Dakota ===
Some time before leaving Reno, Red was in a relationship with a woman he calls "Dakota". Red states that he chose his addiction over Dakota (As referenced in his song "Dakota").

== Anonymity and social media presence ==
Red chooses to keep his identity a secret for multiple reasons, including the fact that he fears people who he knew in Reno could find him, the hat protects him from "old habits and bad influences", and he received more attention while busking on the street.

Red Leather started his career on TikTok, uploading himself playing several different covers. Red currently has 1,400,000 followers on TikTok.

== Musical career ==
=== Busking ===
Red Leather began his music career in Los Angeles by performing on Hollywood Boulevard. During this time, Red began to write his own songs and post cover songs to TikTok.

=== Debut single ===
In June 2022, Red Leather released his debut single called "The Only Time It Rains In Hollywood", a song about homelessness on Hollywood Boulevard. It features the accounts of two homeless people describing how they became homeless and what they had lost in life.

Red released several other singles through 2022 and into 2023.

=== Burn in Hell Tour ===
Red Leather announced a tour ahead of his debut album. The Burn in Hell tour, named after the second song on his debut album, ran from November 1 to 29 and had four stops. One in Los Angeles, California, one in Las Vegas, Nevada, one in Reno, Nevada, and one in Austin, Texas.

Get Out Of My Head Tour

A 2024 Fall tour consisting of 23 Shows. Starting in Columbia, Mo at Rose Music Hall and ending in Indianapolis at Hi-Fi.

=== Tahoe Tour ===
Red Leather announced a tour ahead of his second album Tahoe.

=== Debut album ===
Red Leather released his debut album, Reno, on November 17, 2023.

No.	Title	Length
1.	"Train's Leavin'"	0:55
2.	"Burn in Hell"	3:09
3.	"Deathwish"	2:48
4.	"Sins"	2:58
5.	"Pusherman"	3:19
6.	"The Biggest Little City in the World"	0:24
7.	"El Dorado"	2:06
8.	"Down Bad"	2:57
9.	"Desert Storm"	3:56
10.	"Watch My Daddy Die"	3:04
11.	"Walk Away"	2:39
12.	"House of the Rising Sun (Cover)"	2:18
13.	"Dakota"	2:46
14.	"Devil's Grip"	2:41
15.	"The Only Time It Rains in Hollywood"	5:15
Total length:		41:15

On July 18, 2025, Red released Reno (All In), an expanded version with “Sins” featuring Sueco and WesGhost.

No.	Title	Length
1.	"Train's Leavin'"	0:55
2.	"Burn in Hell"	3:09
3.	"Deathwish"	2:48
4.	"Sins"	2:58
5.	"Pusherman"	3:19
6.	"The Biggest Little City in the World"	0:24
7.	"El Dorado"	2:06
8.	"Down Bad"	2:57
9.	"Desert Storm"	3:56
10.	"Watch My Daddy Die"	3:04
11.	"Walk Away"	2:39
12.	"House of the Rising Sun (Cover)"	2:18
13.	"Dakota"	2:46
14.	"Devil's Grip"	2:41
15.	"The Only Time It Rains in Hollywood"	5:15
16.	"Can’t Get High"	3:52
17.	"Unstoppable"	2:40
18.	"Poison"	4:06
19.	"Catch Me If You Can"	2:30
20.	"Sins (with Sueco & WesGhost"	3:51
Total length:		58

=== Reception ===
Currently, Reno has about 16 million streams on Spotify and Red has about 1.4 million monthly listeners.

== Discography ==
=== Singles ===
Singles from Red Leather
1. "The Only Time It Rains in Hollywood"
  Released: May 22, 2022
2. "Sins"
  Released: August 26, 2022
3. "Deathwish"
  Released: October 28, 2022
4. "Dakota"
  Released: January 27, 2023
5. "Dakota (Radio Edit)"
  Released: January 27, 2023
6. "Down Bad"
  Released: April 7, 2023
7. "Pusherman"
  Released: July 7, 2023
8. "Walk Away"
  Released: October 6, 2023
9. "House of the Rising Sun (cover)"
  Released: October 6, 2023
10. "SOS"
  Released: February 23, 2024
11. "Bury Me in Vegas"
  Released: April 26, 2024
12. "Poison"
  Released: July 12, 2024
13. "Get Out of my Head"
  Released: September 20, 2024
14. "Ms. Whiskey"
  Released: November 15, 2024
15. "Can't Get High"
  Released: February 28, 2025
16. "Bonnie And Clyde"
  Released: April 18, 2025
17. "Sins (with Sueco & WesGhost)"
  Released: July 10, 2025
18. "Wish You Were Here"
  Released: August 22, 2025
19. "Ghost Town"
  Released: November 14, 2025

=== Albums ===
Reno

- Released: November 17, 2023
- Tracks: 15
- Singles: 12

Reno (All In)

- Released: July 18, 2025
- Tracks: 20
- Singles: 15

TAHOE

- Released: February 27, 2026
- Tracks: 16
- Singles: 9
