= Mall Grab =

Australian DJ and producer (born 1994)

- Born: Jordon Alexander; 1994 (age 31–32); Newcastle, New South Wales, Australia
- Genres: House; techno
- Years active: 2015–present
- Website: mallgrab.world

Jordon Alexander (born 1994), known professionally as Mall Grab, is an Australian DJ and producer of house and techno music.

== Musical career ==
Alexander's stage name is derived from a slang expression for when someone holds a skateboard incorrectly, i.e. a "mall grab". From an early age, he was fascinated by his parents' records, which featured mostly rock and roll. Over time, he became influenced by electronic music, which eventually defined his musical work. He has a regular show on Rinse FM radio, where he invites guests from the industry and creates mixes.

In 2020, Alexander released the EP Share a View with the hardcore punk band Turnstile, where he remixed three of the group's songs.

He released his debut album What I Breathe on 5 August 2022.

In 2024, Alexander was included in the Coachella lineup.

== Discography ==
=== Albums ===
List of albums, with selected chart positions
| Title | Details | Peak chart positions | Certifications |
| Title | Details | UK | Certifications |
|---|---|---|---|
| What I Breathe | Released: August 2022; Label: Looking For Trouble (LFTCD01) / (LFTLP01); Format: Digital, CD, 2×LP | 51 | |

=== Extended plays ===
| Title | Year | Peak chart positions | Certifications |
| Title | Year | UK physical | Certifications |
|---|---|---|---|
| "Sun Ra" | 2016 | 49 | |

=== Compilations ===
| Title | Details |
|---|---|
| MG Sides | Released: 2015; Label: Mall Grab (MG001); Format: Digital |
| Worship Friendship | Released: 2020; Label: Looking for Trouble (LFTFRIENDSHIP); Format: Digital |
| 2015 – 2017 | Released: December 2021; Label: Looking for Trouble; Format: Digital |
