= Astrid Sonne =

Danish singer-songwriter and violist

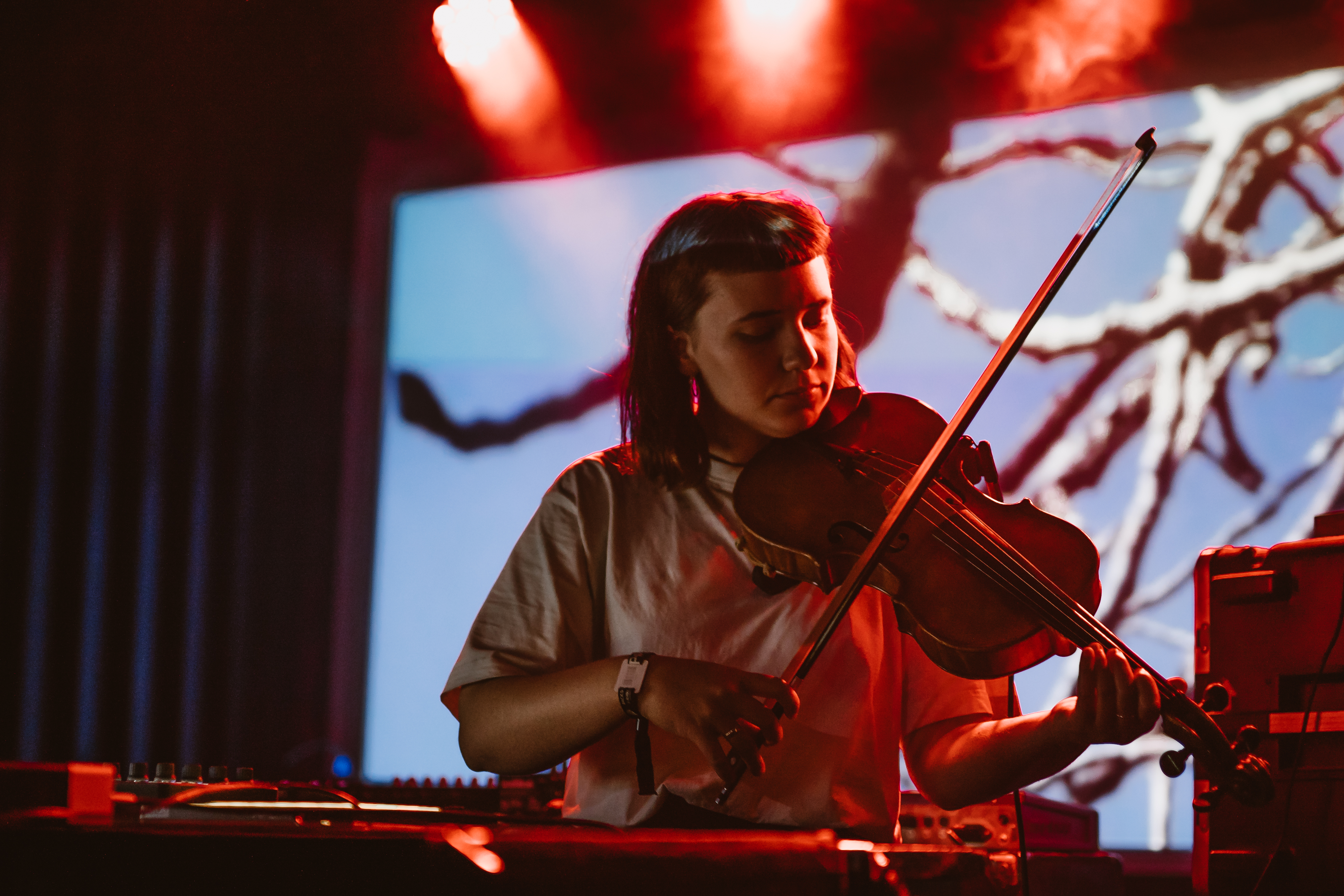
- Sonne performing at the Spot festival in Aarhus, Denmark, in 2018

Background information
- Born: 23 August 1994 (age 31); Bornholm, Denmark
- Origin: Copenhagen, Denmark
- Genres: Electronic; experimental
- Occupations: Musician; singer; songwriter; composer; producer
- Instruments: Vocals; viola
- Years active: 2018–present
- Label: Escho
- Website: astridsonne.com

Astrid Sonne is a Danish singer-songwriter and violist. As of February 2024, she is based in London. She has released the albums Human Lines (2018), Outside Of Your Lifetime (2024), and Great Doubt (2024) as well as two EPs. Her music has been described as electronic and experimental.

== Career ==
Astrid Sonne was born and raised in Bornholm, a small island of Denmark. At six years old, she began playing the viola and, at 16, she moved to Copenhagen. She joined a strict classical training before quitting at 18, moving to digital composition — she learned how to use Ableton Live by herself. After discovering Danish musician Hari Shankar Kishore, known professionally as DJ HVAD, Sonne started refining an electronic style that focused more on melody than on percussion.

On 16 February 2018, Sonne released the album Human Lines, where she tried to combine her classical upbringing with electronic composition. She followed it with the EP Cliodynamics on 4 October 2019, which is mostly electronic. It was preceded by the singles "Area Under a Curve" and "Strong, Calm, Slow". In 2020, she was included in the compilation album Kulør 006. Sonne released the album Outside of Your Lifetime, which is mostly instrumental, on 22 September 2021. It was included in Pitchfork's lists of "Great Records You May Have Missed" for Autumn 2021 and Pitchfork and Paste named it as one of the best electronic albums of the year.

After releasing the EP Ephemeral Camera Feed on 18 March 2022, Sonne released the single "How Far". In June of that year, Pitchfork included the EP in their list of best albums of the year up to that point. Her third studio album, Great Doubt, was released on 26 January 2024. It was preceded by the single "Boost". The Face chose it as one of the best releases of the first quarter of the year. In March, she did a joint show with ML Buch. She later formed the duo Coined alongside Fine Glindvad, a Danish lo-fi folk musician. The Face and Paper highlighted their song "Your House" in May.

In 2026, Sonne was featured on 33's track "New ADHD".

== Musical style ==
Astrid Sonne is a violist who has been described as an electronic and experimental musician. Reviews of Great Doubt mentioned Sonne going towards a "pop singer-songwriter" style.

== Discography ==
Studio albums

- Human Lines (2018)
- Outside Of Your Lifetime (2021)
- Great Doubt (2024)

Extended plays

- Cliodynamics (2019)
- Ephemeral Camera Feed (2022)
