= ML Buch =

Danish musician and producer (born 1987)

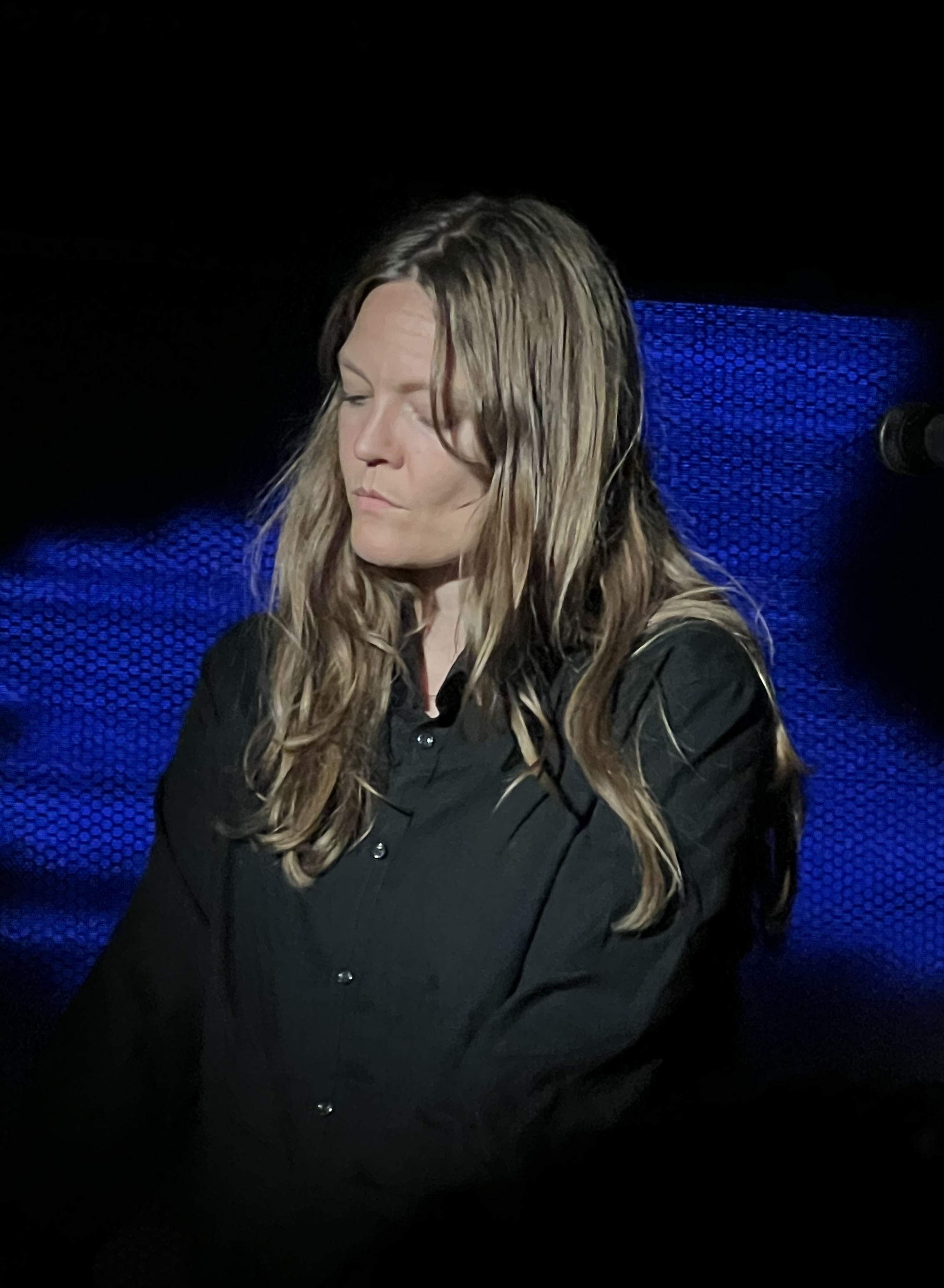
- Buch performing at Elsewhere in Brooklyn, New York, 2024

Background information
- Born: Marie Louise Buch; 1980s
- Origin: Copenhagen, Denmark
- Genres: Art rock; dream pop; soft rock; electropop
- Occupations: Musician; singer; songwriter; composer; producer
- Instruments: Vocals; guitar; keyboard
- Years active: 2017–present
- Labels: Anyines; In Real Life; 15 Love
- Website: mlbuch.com

Marie Louise Buch (/bʊk/; born 1987) is a Danish musician, composer, and producer. She released her debut album Skinned in 2020 and her sophomore album Suntub in 2023, both to critical acclaim.

== Early life ==
Marie Louise Buch was raised in the suburbs of Copenhagen, Denmark, by her mother, a fiddler and accordionist, and visited her father, a rock and roll guitarist, every other weekend. She was given the nickname "ML" by her grandfather, which she later adopted as her stage name, explaining that the name "creates a tiny distance, and I'm free to do what I like inside of that."

Buch moved to Copenhagen as a child. When she was a child, her father introduced her to the music of The Beatles, Kris Kristofferson, and Bo Diddley, and she was especially drawn to Diddley's bandmate Peggy Jones, the first female guitarist she had seen. While learning to play guitar as a teenager, she was further influenced by Michael Jackson, the Metallica album S&M, and Danish bubblegum pop music.

She studied visual culture in college, later attending the Rhythmic Music Conservatory in Copenhagen, where she studied composition.

== Career ==
Buch's first release under the name ML Buch was her debut EP Fleshy in 2017, the same year she began studying at the conservatory.

She announced her debut album Skinned in early 2019, ultimately releasing it on 3 July 2020 on Anyines Records alongside music videos for five tracks. The release was also accompanied by an album-length video depicting the inside of Buch's gastrointestinal tract, captured using a capsule endoscopy camera. Skinned received critical acclaim, with Miles Bowe of Pitchfork summarizing: "In songs as slick and futuristic as the screens that surround us, the Danish electropop musician uses technology as a frame for deeply human feelings."

Buch released the song "Fleshless Hand" on 26 November 2021 alongside a computer-generated imagery music video, followed by further singles "Well Bucket" and "Working It Out" in 2023. Buch released her sophomore album Suntub on 15 Love on 27 October 2023, five years after she began work on the project. She recorded the 15-track album over the course of three years in the coastal Danish city Kalundborg, recording vocals in her Peugeot SUV. Described by Stereogum as "an album about nature, about the human body, about physical experience", Suntub received widespread praise from critics, appearing on several lists of best albums of 2023.

Following the release of Suntub, Buch announced a double-billed tour with fellow Danish singer-songwriter Astrid Sonne in spring 2024, as well as a North American tour in summer 2024.

Buch released Suntub extras, an instrumental EP featuring extra material from Suntub, on 20 December 2024.

== Style ==
ML Buch's music has been variously described as electropop, dream pop, alt-rock, soft rock, art rock, and psychedelic. Kaelen Bell of Exclaim! remarked on the difficulty of classifying Buch's music, describing it as like a "middle-period Joni Mitchell covering Talk Talk and run through a computer made of jelly." Alex Ruder of KEXP noted that Buch's performance style is "reflective of her love of combining seven-string electric guitars in open tunings with synthetic instruments and electronic experiments."

Philip Sherburne of Pitchfork pointed to the differing styles of Buch's first two albums, contrasting the "vaporwave synths, atmospheric sound design, [and] Auto-Tuned choruses" of Skinned with the "sparkling guitars, frictionless rock drumming, and vocal melodies rendered with airbrushed clarity" of Suntub, marking a "shift from URL to IRL".

== Discography ==
=== Studio albums ===
Title	Details
Skinned	Released: 3 July 2020; Label: Anyines
Suntub	Released: 27 October 2023; Label: 15 love

=== Extended plays ===
Title	Details
Fleshy	Released: 23 February 2017; Label: In Real Life Music under exclusive license to AWAL Recordings America, Inc.
Suntub extras	Released: 20 December 2024

=== Singles ===
Title	Details
Can You Hear My Heart Leave	Released: 22 May 2018; Label: Skinned
Well bucket/ Working it out	Released: 28 September 2023; Label: 15 love
getting to know each other	Released: 16 October 2024; Label: section1
