= Mura Masa discography =

- Studio albums: 4
- EPs: 1
- Singles: 22

This is the discography of British producer Mura Masa.

== Studio albums ==
List of studio albums, with selected chart positions and certifications
Title	Album details	Peak chart positions						Certifications
Title	Album details	UK	AUS	BEL (FL)	NZ	SCO	US	Certifications
Mura Masa	Released: 14 July 2017; Label: Polydor, Anchor Point; Format: CD, LP, digital download	19	49	13	35	—	192	BPI: Silver
R.Y.C	Released: 17 January 2020; Label: Polydor, Anchor Point; Format: CD, LP, digital download, cassette	23	—	187	—	—	—	
Demon Time	Released: 16 September 2022; Label: Polydor, Anchor Point; Format: CD, LP, digital download	— (Note: Demon Time did not enter the UK Albums Chart but peaked at number 29 on the UK Album Sales chart.)	—	—	—	43	—	
Curve 1	Released: 23 August 2024; Label: Pond Recordings; Format: CD, LP, digital download	—	—	—	—	—	—	
Curve 2	Released: 2027; Label: Pond Recordings; Format: CD, LP, digital download	—	—	—	—	—	—	
"—" denotes release that did not chart or was not released in that territory.

== Extended plays ==
- Someday Somewhere (2015)
- Curve +1 (2025)

== Mixtapes ==
- Soundtrack to a Death (2014)

== Singles ==
=== As lead artist ===
List of singles as lead artist, with selected chart positions and certifications, showing year released and album name
Title	Year	Peak chart positions						Certifications	Album
Title	Year	UK	AUS	BEL (FL)	DEN	NZ	US Dance	Certifications	Album
"Firefly" (featuring Nao)	2015	—	—	—	—	—	—	BPI: Silver	Someday Somewhere
"Love for That" (featuring Shura)	2015	—	—	—	—	—	—		Non-album single
"What If I Go?" (featuring Bonzai)	2016	—	—	47	—	—	39		Mura Masa
"Love$ick" (featuring A$AP Rocky)	2016	59	14	46	20	13	18	ARIA: 2× Platinum; BPI: Platinum; IFPI DEN: Gold; RIAA: Gold; RMNZ: Platinum	Mura Masa
"1 Night" (featuring Charli XCX)	2017	—	—	— (Note: "1 Night" did not enter the Ultratop 50, but peaked at number 32 on the Flemish Ultratip chart.)	—	— (Note: "1 Night" did not enter the NZ Top 40 Singles Chart, but peaked at number eight on the NZ Heatseekers Singles Chart.)	31		Mura Masa
"All Around the World" (featuring Desiigner)	2017	—	—	—	—	—	—		Mura Masa
"Wave" / "Sole M8s"	2017	—	—	—	—	—	—		Non-album single
"Second 2 None" / "Blu" (featuring Christine and the Queens / Damon Albarn)	2017	—	—	— (Note: "Second 2 None" did not enter the Ultratop 50, but peaked at number 19 on the Flemish Ultratip chart.)	—	—	—		Mura Masa
"Nuggets" / "Helpline" (featuring Bonzai / Tom Tripp)	2017	—	—	— (Note: "Nuggets" did not enter the Ultratop 50, but peaked at number 19 on the Flemish Ultratip chart.)	—	—	—		Mura Masa
"Untitled" (featuring Moses Boyd)	2017	—	—	—	—	—	—		Non-album single
"U Never Call Me" (with Jadu Heart)	2017	—	—	—	—	—	—		Melt Away
"Move Me" (featuring Octavian)	2018	—	—	— (Note: "Move Me" did not enter the Ultratop 50, but peaked at number 33 on the Flemish Ultratip chart.)	—	—	—		Non-album singles
"Complicated" (with Nao)	2018	—	—	— (Note: "Complicated" did not enter the Ultratop 50, but peaked at number 23 on the Flemish Ultratip chart.)	—	—	—		Non-album singles
"Doorman" (with slowthai)	2018	—	—	—	—	—	—	BPI: Silver	Nothing Great About Britain
"I Don't Think I Can Do This Again" (with Clairo)	2019	—	—	—	—	—	—		R.Y.C
"No Hope Generation"	2019	—	—	—	—	—	—		R.Y.C
"Deal wiv It" (with slowthai)	2019	—	—	—	—	—	—		R.Y.C
"Teenage Headache Dreams" (with Ellie Rowsell of Wolf Alice)	2020	—	—	—	—	—	—		R.Y.C
"2gether" (with Gretel Hänlyn)	2021	—	—	—	—	— (Note: "2gether" did not enter the NZ Top 40 Singles Chart, but peaked at number 34 on the NZ Hot Singles Chart.)	—		Demon Time
"Bbycakes" (with Lil Uzi Vert and PinkPantheress featuring Shygirl)	2022	71	—	—	—	— (Note: "Bbycakes" did not enter the NZ Top 40 Singles Chart, but peaked at number 24 on the NZ Hot Singles Chart.)	—		Demon Time
"Blessing Me" (with Pa Salieu and Skillibeng)	2022	—	—	—	—	—	—		Demon Time
"Hollaback Bitch" (with Shygirl and Channel Tres)	2022	—	—	—	—	—	—		Demon Time
"E-Motions" (with Erika de Casier)	2022	—	—	—	—	—	—		Demon Time
"Keep It Lo" (with Ojerime)	2022	—	—	—	—	—	—		Bad Influence
"Whenever I Want"	2023	—	—	—	—	—	—		Curve 1
"Drugs" (featuring Daniela Lalita)	2023	—	—	—	—	—	—		Curve 1
"Máquina Culona" (with Ralphie Choo)	2023	—	—	—	—	—	—		Supernova
"My Baby Made Me Do It..." (with Wyllis & FREEWRL Music)	2023	—	—	—	—	—	—		Non-album singles
"Love" (featuring Daniela Lalita)	2023	—	—	—	—	—	—		Non-album singles
"Still"	2024	—	—	—	—	—	—		Curve 1
"We Are Making Out" (featuring Yeule)	2024	—	—	—	—	—	—		Curve 1
"Fly" (featuring Cherish)	2024	—	—	—	—	—	—		Curve 1
"Jump"	2025	—	—	—	—	—	—		Curve +1
"Forever" (with George Riley)	2025	—	—	—	—	—	—		Non-album single
"I'm Really Hot (For Myself)"	2025	—	—	—	—	—	—		Curve +1
"Needja" (with Ledbyher)	2026	—	—	—	—	—	—		Curve 2
"Nobody Can Know Me Like You Do"	2026	—	—	—	—	—	—		Curve 2
"—" denotes releases that did not chart or were not released in that territory.

=== As a featured artist ===
List of singles as featured artist, showing year released and album name
Title	Year	Peak chart positions	Album
Title	Year	BEL (FL) Tip	Album
"Till the World Falls" (Nile Rodgers & Chic featuring Mura Masa, Cosha and Vic Mensa)	2018	16	It's About Time
"She Abunai" (Alice Longyu Gao featuring Mura Masa and Bülow)	2021	—	TBA
"Wiggle It" (Good Morning Kevin featuring Mura Masa and Big Freedia)	2024	—	Non-album single
"Tiroteo" (Daniela Lalita featuring Mura Masa)	2026	—	Non-album single

== Other charted songs ==
Title	Year	Peak chart positions	Album
Title	Year	US Dance	Album
"Sour Candy" (Mura Masa remix) (Lady Gaga and Blackpink featuring Shygirl and Mura Masa)	2021	24	Dawn of Chromatica

== Other appearances ==
List of songs co-written, and featuring production involvement, instrumentation, and/or engineering for other artists, showing year released and album name
Title	Year	Lead artist	Album	Credit(s)			
Title	Year	Lead artist	Album	Writing	Production	Instrumentation	Engineering
"Part Deaux"	2013	Quinn XCII	Shlup		Yes		
"Then There's Me"	2014	Kill Bill: The Rapper	RAMONA		Yes		
"Dry"	2014	18+	Trust		Co		
"All Up In My Feelings"	2015	Young Kraze	Non-album single		Yes		
"This Simple Pleasure"	2015	Billie Black	This Simple Pleasure	Yes	Yes		
"Runner Up"	2015	Billie Black	This Simple Pleasure	Yes	Yes		
"Call You 1-2-3"	2015	Billie Black	This Simple Pleasure	Yes	Yes		
"Skhokho"	2015	Bonzai	Royah	Yes	Yes		
"Seven Months"	2016	Låpsley	Long Way Home	Yes	Co	Percussion, programming, synthesizer	
"Lights On"	2016	Bonzai	Lunacy	Yes	Yes		
"Leave Me Alone"	2016	Liana Banks	Non-album single		Yes		
"Be Alright"	2016	Ariana Grande	Dangerous Woman	Yes			
"2B"	2016	Bonzai	Lunacy	Yes	Yes		
"Ding Ding Ding"	2016	Bonzai	Lunacy	Yes	Yes		
"First Things First	2017	Stormzy	Gang Signs & Prayer	Yes	Co	Programming	
"Boys on the Block"	2017	Amir Royale	Atmospheric	Yes	Yes		
"I Feel Alright"	2017	Cosha	Non-album single	Yes	Co	Synthesizer	
"U Never Call Me" (feat. Mura Masa)	2017	Jadu Heart	Melt Away	Yes	Co		
"Paranoid"	2017	Jeshi	The World's Spinning Too Fast		Co		
"Better With You"	2018	Michl	Non-album single	Yes	Yes		
"When U Call"	2018	Cosha	R.I.P Bonzai		Co		
"Bladerunnin"	2018	Cosha	R.I.P Bonzai		Co		
"Brake Lights" (feat. NAO)	2018	Cosha	R.I.P Bonzai		Yes		
"Honey"	2018	Cosha	R.I.P Bonzai		Co		
"Rare Fruit"	2018	Cosha	R.I.P Bonzai		Co		
"Jaw Bone"	2018	Cosha	R.I.P Bonzai		Co		
"U Better"	2018	Cosha	R.I.P Bonzai		Co		
"This Life"	2018	Cosha	R.I.P Bonzai		Co		
"Flacko"	2018	Cosha	R.I.P Bonzai		Co		
"Till the World Falls" (feat. Mura Masa, Cosha & Vic Mensa)	2018	CHIC	It's About Time	Yes	Co	Drums, percussion, programming, keyboards	
"If You Ever"	2018	NAO	Saturn	Yes	Co		
"A Brand New Day" (with Zara Larsson)	2019	BTS	BTS World: Original Soundtrack	Yes	Yes	Drum programming, synthesizer	
"entertnmnt"	2020	Oklou	Non-album single	Yes	Co		
"BEFORE LOVE CAME TO KILL US"	2020	Jessie Reyez	BEFORE LOVE CAME TO KILL US	Yes	Additional		
"Can't Fight"	2020	Lianne La Havas	Lianne La Havas	Yes	Co		
"Berlin Air"	2021	Cosha	Mt. Pleasant		Co		
"Lapdance From Asia" (feat. Shygirl)	2021	Cosha	Mt. Pleasant		Co		
"Tighter" (feat. Coby Sey)	2021	Cosha	Mt. Pleasant	Yes	Co		
"Hot Tub"	2021	Cosha	Mt. Pleasant		Co		
"Bad Luck"	2021	Cosha	Mt. Pleasant		Co		
"Just for me"	2021	PinkPantheress	to hell with it	Yes	Yes	Drums, keyboards, programming	Yes
"Bites on My Neck"	2022	yeule	Glitch Princess		Co		
"insecure"	2022	Donna Missal	in the mirror, in the night	Yes	Co		
"Where You Are" (feat. WILLOW)	2022	PinkPantheress	Non-album single	Yes	Co	Programming	
"Tangled	2022	gglum	Weak Teeth	Yes	Co		
"Slugeye"	2022	Gretel	Slugeye	Yes	Co		
"Motorbike"	2022	Gretel	Slugeye	Yes	Co		
"In the Water"	2022	Gretel	Slugeye		Co		
"Coochie (a bedtime story)"	2022	Shygirl	Nymph	Yes	Co		
"Heaven"	2022	Shygirl	Nymph	Yes	Co		
"Nike"	2022	Shygirl	Nymph	Yes	Co		
"Honey"	2022	Shygirl	Nymph		Additional		
"Boy's a liar"	2022	PinkPantheress	Take me home	Yes	Co	Bass, guitar, keyboards, percussion	
"Dry Me"	2023	Gretel	Head of the Love Club		Co		
"Drive"	2023	Gretel	Head of the Love Club	Yes	Co		
"King of Nothing"	2023	Gretel	Head of the Love Club	Yes	Co		
"The Head of the Love Club"	2023	Gretel	Head of the Love Club	Yes	Co		
"Today (can't help but cry)"	2023	Gretel	Head of the Love Club		Co		
"Heaven" (feat. Tinashe)	2023	Shygirl	Nymph_o	Yes	Co		
"Woe (I Feel It From Your Side) (Björk Remix)"	2023	Shygirl	Nymph_o	Yes	Co		
"Playboy / Positions"	2023	Shygirl	Nymph_o	Yes	Co		
"Come So Far ."	2023	tendai	three.two	Yes	Co		
"MÁQUINA CULONA" (with Mura Masa)	2023	Ralphie Choo	SUPERNOVA	Yes	Co	Programming	
"the ripple"	2023	Lauren Auder	the infinite spine	Yes	Yes		
"Dientes" (with Usher & DJ Khaled)	2023	J Balvin	Non-album single	Yes	Co		
"softscars"	2023	yeule	softscars		Co		
"software update"	2023	yeule	softscars		Co		
"aphex twin flame"	2023	yeule	softscars		Co		
"Heaven Knows"	2023	Christian Alexander	Monsters	Yes	Co		
"Monsters"	2023	Christian Alexander	Monsters	Yes	Co		
"Cry Me A River"	2023	Gretel	TBA	Yes	Yes		
"Another life" (feat. Rema)	2023	PinkPantheress	Heaven knows		Additional	Programming	
"True romance"	2023	PinkPantheress	Heaven knows		Additional	Programming	
"Mosquito"	2023	PinkPantheress	Heaven knows		Additional	Programming	
"The aisle"	2023	PinkPantheress	Heaven knows		Additional	Programming	
"Nice to meet you" (feat. Central Cee)	2023	PinkPantheress	Heaven knows		Additional	Programming	
"Bury me" (feat. Kelela)	2023	PinkPantheress	Heaven knows		Additional	Programming	
"Internet baby (interlude)"	2023	PinkPantheress	Heaven knows		Additional	Programming	
"Ophelia"	2023	PinkPantheress	Heaven knows		Additional	Programming	
"Feel complete"	2023	PinkPantheress	Heaven knows	Yes	Co	Programming	
"Blue"	2023	PinkPantheress	Heaven knows		Additional	Programming	
"Feelings"	2023	PinkPantheress	Heaven knows			Programming	
"Capable of love"	2023	PinkPantheress	Heaven knows		Additional	Programming	
"Boy's a liar Pt. 2" (feat. Ice Spice)	2023	PinkPantheress	Heaven knows	Yes	Co	Bass, guitar, keyboards, percussion	
"Burn the Hard Drive" (feat. Mura Masa)	2024	Jade Bird	Burn the Hard Drive	Yes	Yes		
"C.O.M.P.L.E.X."	2024	Jade Bird	Burn the Hard Drive	Yes	Yes		
"You've Fallen In Love Again"	2024	Jade Bird	Burn the Hard Drive	Yes	Yes		
"C'est La Vie"	2024	Jade Bird	Burn the Hard Drive		Yes		
"Breaking the Grey"	2024	Jade Bird	Burn the Hard Drive	Yes	Yes		
"Sun Back"	2024	Cosha	MurMurs		Co		
"Relish"	2024	Cosha	MurMurs		Co		
"Want You Back"	2024	Cosha	MurMurs		Co		
"Perfect"	2024	Cosha	MurMurs		Co		
"MurMurs Interlude"	2024	Cosha	MurMurs		Co		
"Glow"	2024	Cosha	MurMurs		Co		
"Turn it up"	2024	PinkPantheress	TBA		Additional		
"Far Out"	2024	Gretel	TBA	Yes	Yes	Drums, electric guitar	Recording
"Cycles"	2024	Griff	Vertigo	Yes	Co	Drum programming, guitar, synthesizer	
"CRAZY" (feat. PinkPantheress)	2024	LE SSERAFIM	Non-album single		Co		Mixing
"4LUVN"	2024	LSDXOXO	DOGMA		Co		
"BRAND NEW"	2024	LSDXOXO	DOGMA		Co		

== Remixes ==
Title	Year	Artist
"Freeze"	2013	Moko
"Mosh Pitt"	2013	Flosstradamus (featuring Casino)
"Drums"	2014	Hartebeest
"Upper Echelon"	2014	Travis Scott (featuring T.I. and 2 Chainz)
"Kings and Queens"	2014	Brooke Fraser
"The Lawnmower"	2014	Aryay
"I'll Be Alright (Tonight)"	2014	Childish Gambino
"Kingpin"	2014	RL Grime (featuring Big Sean)
"Gas Pedal"	2014	Sage The Gemini (featuring Iamsu!)
"Fade Out Lines"	2015	The Avener
"Stranger / Lover"	2015	Ibeyi
"Thinking Out Loud"	2015	Ed Sheeran
"Losing You"	2015	Aquilo
"Night Swimmers"	2016	Foals
"Be Like You"	2016	Linden Jay
"In the Morning"	2017	Nao
"Did You See"	2017	J Hus
"I Feel Alright"	2017	Bonzai
"Walking Away"	2017	HAIM
"Slip Away"	2018	Perfume Genius
"Toast"	2019	Koffee
"Throne"	2019	Koffee
"Are You Bored Yet?"	2020	Wallows (featuring Clairo)
"Go Fast Baby"	2020	Raissa
"Talks"	2020	PVA
"Oreo"	2020	Tohji
"Bitch Don't Be Mad" (with Nao)	2021	Maeta
"Sour Candy" (with Shygirl) (Note: Included in Lady Gaga's Dawn of Chromatica: The Remix Album)	2021	Lady Gaga and Blackpink
"You Make It Look so Easy"	2021	Himera (featuring Petal Supply)
"Polite"	2021	Erika de Casier
"It's Euphoric"	2023	Georgia
"Love Like This"	2023	Zayn
"Honey"	2024	Troye Sivan
"Boomerang"	2024	Becky G
"MENINA"	2024	Nathy Peluso, Lua de Santana
"U"	2024	Jadu Heart
