= NME Awards 2020 =

2020 NME Awards
- Date: 12 February 2020
- Location: O2 Academy Brixton, London
- Hosted by: Katherine Ryan and Julie Adenuga
- Website: www.nme.com

The 2020 NME Awards were held on 12 February 2020 at the O2 Academy Brixton in London and were hosted by comedian Katherine Ryan and radio host Julie Adenuga. The nominations were announced on 20 January 2020.

Among the special awards given, the Glastonbury Festival organizer Emily Eavis received the Godlike Genius Award, Swedish singer and songwriter Robyn received the Songwriter of the Decade Award, British band Arctic Monkeys won Album of the Decade for their 2013 album AM, The 1975 won Band of the Decade and American singer Courtney Love received the Icon Award.

== Winners and nominees ==
Best British Album	Best Album in the World
Little Simz – GREY Area; FKA twigs – Magdalene; Foals – Everything Not Saved Will Be Lost, Part 2; Michael Kiwanuka – Kiwanuka; Slowthai – Nothing Great About Britain	Lana Del Rey – Norman Fucking Rockwell!; Billie Eilish – When We All Fall Asleep, Where Do We Go?; FKA twigs – Magdalene; Foals – Everything Not Saved Will Be Lost, Part 2; Little Simz – GREY Area; Michael Kiwanuka – Kiwanuka; Slipknot – We Are Not Your Kind; Slowthai – Nothing Great About Britain; Stella Donnelly – Beware of the Dogs; Tyler, the Creator – IGOR
Best British Song	Best Song in the World
AJ Tracey – "Ladbroke Grove"; Dua Lipa – "Don't Start Now"; Georgia – "About Work the Dancefloor"; Mura Masa ft. Slowthai – "Deal Wiv It"; The 1975 – "People"	Billie Eilish – "Bad Guy"; AJ Tracey – "Ladbroke Grove"; Clairo – "Bags"; Dua Lipa – "Don't Start Now"; Georgia – "About Work the Dancefloor"; Lil Nas X – "Old Town Road (remix)"; Lizzo – "Juice"; Mura Masa ft. Slowthai – "Deal Wiv It"; Post Malone – "Circles"; The 1975 – "People"
Best British Solo Act	Best Solo Act in the World
FKA twigs; AJ Tracey; Charli XCX; Slowthai; Yungblud	Taylor Swift; AJ Tracey; Beck; Billie Eilish; Charli XCX; FKA twigs; Lana Del Rey; Lizzo; Slowthai; Yungblud
Best British Band	Best Band in the World
The 1975; Bring Me the Horizon; IDLES; Krept & Konan; The Big Moon	Slipknot; Bring Me the Horizon; Brockhampton; BTS; HAIM; IDLES; Krept & Konan; Tame Impala; The 1975; The Big Moon
Best New British Act	Best New Act in the World
Easy Life; Celeste; D-Block Europe; Jade Bird; Sam Fender	Clairo; Celeste; D-Block Europe; DaBaby; Dominic Fike; Easy Life; Fontaines D.C.; Girl in Red; Jade Bird; Sam Fender
Best Live Act	Best Collaboration
Foals; Amyl + The Sniffers; Iggy Pop; Lizzo; Slowthai	Slowthai + Mura Masa; BTS + Halsey; Charli XCX + Christine and the Queens; Megan Thee Stallion + DaBaby; Yungblud + Dan Reynolds
Best Music Video	Best Reissue
Yungblud – "Original Me"; Brockhampton – "I Been Born Again"; Easy Life – "Nice Guys"; Normani – "Motivation"; Stormzy – "Vossi Bop"	Muse – Origin of Muse; Aretha Franklin – Amazing Grace; Prince – 1999; R.E.M. – Monster 25; The Beatles – Abbey Road
Best British Festival	Best Small Festival
Glastonbury; All Points East; Parklife; Reading & Leeds; Wireless	End of the Road; Bluedot; Iceland Airwaves; Kendal Calling; Øya
Best Festival in the World	Best Festival Headliner
Glastonbury; All Points East; Coachella; Fuji Rock; Mad Cool; Parklife; Reading & Leeds; Rock in Rio; Sziget; Wireless	The Cure; Cardi B; Lana Del Rey; Stormzy; The 1975
Best Film	Best Film Actor
Blue Story; Hustlers; Joker; Midsommar; Once Upon a Time in Hollywood	Micheal Ward; Florence Pugh; Joaquin Phoenix; Lupita Nyong'o; Taron Egerton
Best TV Series	Best TV Actor
Peaky Blinders; The End of the F***ing World; Fleabag; Stranger Things; Top Boy	Jessica Barden; Asa Butterfield; Jodie Comer; Kano; Zendaya
Best Music Film	Best Music Book
Liam Gallagher: As It Was; Beyoncé: Homecoming; BTS: Bring the Soul; Michael Hutchence: Mystify; Rocketman	Elton John – Me; Brett Anderson – Afternoons with the Blinds Drawn; Debbie Harry – Face It: A Memoir; Prince – The Beautiful Ones; Tegan & Sara – High School
Best Podcast	Best Game
Have You Heard George's Podcast?; My Dad Wrote a Porno; Sex Power Money; Stay Free: The Story of The Clash; The Missing Cryptoqueen	Star Wars Jedi: Fallen Order; Death Stranding; Sekiro: Shadows Die Twice; Super Smash Bros. Ultimate; The Outer Worlds

== Special awards ==
NME Radar Award

- Beabadoobee

Innovation Award

- The 1975

Icon Award

- Courtney Love

Songwriter of the Decade

- Robyn

Godlike Genius Award

- Emily Eavis

Album of the Decade

- AM – Arctic Monkeys

Band of the Decade

- The 1975

Villain of the Year

- Piers Morgan

Music Moment of the Year

- BTS – Wembley Stadium
