= Evangelic Girl Is a Gun =

Studio album by Yeule
- Released: 30 May 2025
- Length: 31:38
- Label: Ninja Tune
- Producer: Clams Casino; Nat Ćmiel; A.G. Cook; Fitnesss; Chris Greatti; Kin Leonn; Mura Masa

Yeule chronology
Softscars (2023)	Evangelic Girl Is a Gun (2025)

Singles from Evangelic Girl Is a Gun
- 1. "Eko" Released: 24 October 2024; 2. "Skullcrusher" Released: 3 March 2025; 3. "Evangelic Girl Is a Gun" Released: 8 April 2025; 4. "Dudu" Released: 14 May 2025

Evangelic Girl Is a Gun is the fourth studio album by Singaporean artist Yeule. It was released on 30 May 2025, through Ninja Tune. The album was conceived as a painterly and introspective project, with Yeule citing Polish artist Zdzisław Beksiński as a key influence. They also framed the record as an extension of their life as a painter, as the singer reflected emotions that are both violent and gentle while attempting to preserve fleeting moments.

The album continues the darker and more cathartic direction of their previous album Softscars (2023), moving away from glitchy dream-pop toward abstract pop, informed by shoegaze, grunge, and 1990s alternative music; while it explores themes of embodied self-destruction and literary romanticism. Evangelic Girl Is a Gun was preceded by four singles, "Eko", "Skullcrusher", the title track, and "Dudu", and supported by music videos including the production from A. G. Cook, Chris Greatti, Mura Masa, Clams Casino, Fitnesss, and Kin Leonn, the latter also serving as co-executive producer.

To promote the album, Yeule performed on television for the first time and announced the Eva Girl Tour which spans Europe and North America. Upon release, the album received generally positive reviews, with critics praising its aesthetic cohesion and imaginative scope, while some noted emotional distance or overly dense production. Commercially, Evangelic Girl Is a Gun charted modestly in the United Kingdom and Scotland, and also appeared on France's Rock & Metal Albums chart.

== Background ==
i salute to all the artists who walked alongside me through the light and fire. with just a flickering candle glow of an idea in my mind & nothing but a shadow, you held my hand and gave me the paint to mark its form into reality. i admire and love you all devotedly. the nature of creation is a tempestuous one. creation of art, creation of memory, creation of all things. it is both diamond heart sparkling, sentimental, fulfilling but it can also be tormenting. i come out the other way scathed for the love of making art forever and i will always love you glitches in all dimensional rifts, where angels voices echo in voids empty in crushing darkness in ether æterna.

– via Yeule's Instagram post

Yeule stated that the album was inspired by Polish painter Zdzisław Beksiński, describing it as a reflection of her life as a painter. She highlighted Beksiński's dystopian yet serene imagery, calling painting "a reflection of my emotions, both violent and gentle", and likening it to a way of preserving fleeting moments in time. Additionally, she characterized the project as one that "grapples with ideas of a self-destructive identity burning through the canvas of post-modernity".

== Release and promotion ==
The album's first single, "Eko", was released on 23 October 2024 alongside the caption indicating "3 of 10", which raised a speculation that her new album would be released. According to press release, it was described as "about obsession and love and a voice echoing in yeule's head". On 3 March 2025, Evangelic Girl Is a Gun was announced along with its cover art, tracklist, and the second single, "Skullcrusher". It was accompanied by the music video, directed by Neil Krug. It was revealed that production on the project was handled by A. G. Cook, Chris Greatti, Mura Masa, Clams Casino, Fitnesss, and Kin Leonn who additionally took on a co-executive producer role following their work on Softscars (2023). The third single, "Evangelic Girl Is a Gun", was released on 8 April 2025, alongside the music video. "Dudu" was released on 14 May 2025, as the fourth and last single from the album.

On 21 May 2025, Yeule performed "Skullcrusher" in their television debut on Everybody's Live with John Mulaney.

=== Tour ===
Following the release of the album, Yeule announced the Eva Girl Tour, which encompasses both existing European dates and newly added North American stops. The North American leg of the tour is scheduled to take place in September. Tickets went on sale in June, beginning with an artist pre-sale on June 18 at 10 a.m. local time, followed by the general on-sale two days later on June 20 at 10 a.m. local time.

== Composition ==
Evangelic Girl Is a Gun continues the darker and more cathartic approach that Yeule adopted on her previous album Softscars (2023). Sonically, the album is a "far cry from the glitchy dream-pop" of Softscars, as it conjures "abstract pop visions". It draws on shoegaze, grunge, and other 1990s alternative influences, alongside heavily from the dark, surreal imagery of Polish artist Zdzisław Beksiński. The album, a swift-paced, "short but substantial listen" that provides guidance needed to explore new soundscapes, presents a "painterly" construction of fragmented aspects of the singer's darker persona. The record also leans into the contrast of "wistful vocals against steely, computerized rhythms". Narratively, Evangelic Girl Is a Gun explores themes of embodied self-destruction and literary romanticism, and maintains an "other-worldly cyber-darling nuance that, somehow, feels entirely innate".

== Critical reception ==
Professional ratings
Aggregate scores
Source	Rating
AnyDecentMusic?	7.9/10
Metacritic	81/100
Review scores
Source	Rating
AllMusic	4/5 stars
Beats Per Minute	85%
Clash	9/10
DIY	4/5 stars
The Line of Best Fit	9/10
Paste	8.6/10
Pitchfork	5.9/10
PopMatters	8/10
Sputnikmusic	3.4/5
Under the Radar	8.5/10 stars

According to the review aggregator Metacritic, Evangelic Girl Is a Gun received "universal acclaim" based on a weighted average score of 81 out of 100 from 10 critic scores.

Writing for AllMusic, Paul Simpson felt that Evangelic Girl Is a Gun "doesn't feel quite as personal" as Yeule's earlier releases, noting the lyrics less frequently address concrete themes such as body dissatisfaction, while the sound leans toward a more "comfortably retro" palette than the stark futurism of the previous two albums. Arielle Gordan of Pitchfork also identified moments of promise, as it suggested the record hints at "a new, more embodied sound" through lighter vocal processing, but ultimately argued that Yeule is "overwhelmed by the dense production", which at times buckles under the weight of its influences.

Other critics emphasized the album's aesthetic cohesion and imaginative scope; Clash's Elle Palmer described the record as "intrinsically" Yeule, and portrayed it as a collage of trip-hop, distorted guitars, and anguished vocals that channels dread and darkness into a "truly complete project". Amy Perdoni of The Line of Best Fit interpreted the album as gothic electronica shaped by painterly influence, portraying its songs as an "everlasting portrait" that blurs the line between author and character. Paste author Cassidy Sollazzo viewed the album as a decisive step forward and framed Yeule as a "post-human pop star" who deconstructs reality through genre-hopping forms and repeated identity confrontations. John Amen from PopMatters, meanwhile, situated the record as the final part of a loose trilogy, praising the singer's pop melodies and incorporeal vocal presence while noting that, even as a grounded "earthling", traces of their cosmic origins remain audible. Chris Kelly of the Washington Post said the album touches on "data destruction, burning pixels, cruel cuts of meat and the true costs of modern life".

== Commercial performance ==
In the United Kingdom, the album peaked at number 18 on the UK Independent Albums chart. It also reached number 40 on the UK Albums Sales chart and number 56 on the UK Album Downloads chart. The album charted highly in Scotland, reaching number 29 on the Scottish Albums chart. In France, the album appeared on the French Rock & Metal Albums chart at number 92.

== Track listing ==
All tracks were written by Nat Ćmiel and Chris Greatti, except where noted.

Evangelic Girl Is a Gun track listing
No.	Title	Music	Producer(s)	Length
1.	"Tequila Coma"	Ćmiel; Alexander Crossan	Ćmiel; Mura Masa	2:51
2.	"The Girl Who Sold Her Face"		Ćmiel; Greatti^{[p]}	2:49
3.	"Eko"		Ćmiel; Greatti^{[p]}	3:43
4.	"1967"	Ćmiel; Kin Leonn	Ćmiel; Leonn	3:51
5.	"VV"		Ćmiel; Greatti^{[p]}	3:50
6.	"Dudu"		Ćmiel; Greatti^{[p]}	3:06
7.	"What3vr"	Ćmiel; Crossan	Ćmiel; Mura Masa	2:47
8.	"Saiko"	Ćmiel; Alexander Guy Cook	Ćmiel; A. G. Cook	3:30
9.	"Evangelic Girl Is a Gun"	Ćmiel; Leonn	Ćmiel; Leonn	3:03
10.	"Skullcrusher"	Ćmiel; Ryan Bernardo; Michael Volpe	Ćmiel; Clams Casino; Fitnesss	2:08
Total length:				31:38

=== Note ===
- ^{^[p]} signifies a primary and vocal producer.

== Personnel ==
Credits were adapted from Tidal.

- Nat Ćmiel – vocals, guitar (all tracks); synthesizer (tracks 1–7, 9, 10), art direction, design
- Kin Leonn – mastering (all tracks), guitar (tracks 4, 9), synthesizer (9)
- Nathan Boddy – mixing (tracks 1–7)
- Alex Evans – mixing (tracks 8–10)
- Lilian Nuthall – mixing assistance (tracks 1–7)
- Mura Masa – guitar (tracks 1, 7)
- Chris Greatti – guitar (tracks 2, 3, 5, 6)
- Rhys Hastings – drums (track 3)
- Kane Ritchotte – drums (track 5)
- A. G. Cook – guitar (track 8)
- Clams Casino – bass, drums, guitar, synthesizer (track 10)
- Fitnesss – bass, drums, guitar (track 10)
- Vasso Vu – photography

== Charts ==
Chart (2025)	Peak position
French Rock & Metal Albums (SNEP)	92
Scottish Albums (OCC)	29
UK Album Downloads (OCC)	56
UK Albums Sales (OCC)	40
UK Independent Albums (OCC)	18
