= Euphoric (album) =

Studio album by Georgia
- Released: 28 July 2023
- Genre: Dance-pop; electro-pop
- Length: 36:13
- Label: Domino
- Producer: Georgia Barnes; Rostam Batmanglij

Georgia chronology
Seeking Thrills (2020)	Euphoric (2023)

Singles from Euphoric
- 1. "It's Euphoric" Released: 29 March 2023; 2. "Give It Up for Love" Released: 13 June 2023; 3. "All Night" Released: 12 July 2023

Euphoric is the third studio album by English singer-songwriter Georgia, released on 28 July 2023 through Domino Recording Company. It was produced by Rostam Batmanglij, and preceded by the singles "It's Euphoric", "Give It Up for Love" and "All Night".

== Background and recording ==
Georgia described the album as a surrender "to my issues, to my past, to my flaws and to the healing process". Producer Rostam Batmanglij contacted her to tell her he found her voice "incredible" after hearing her collaboration with Mura Masa on 2020's "Live Like We're Dancing", and when Georgia was in Los Angeles for a show, she contacted him. By the end of the next day, the pair had finished recording the lead single, "It's Euphoric".

== Critical reception ==
Professional ratings
Aggregate scores
Source	Rating
Metacritic	75/100
Review scores
Source	Rating
AllMusic	3.5/5 stars
The Arts Desk	3/5 stars
DIY	4/5 stars
Exclaim!	7/10
The Line of Best Fit	6/10
MusicOMH	4/5 stars
NME	3/5 stars
Paste	8.0/10
Pitchfork	6.3/10
Slant Magazine	3/5 stars

Euphoric received a score of 75 out of 100 on review aggregator Metacritic based on nine critics' reviews, indicating "generally favorable" reception. Cheri Amour of The Arts Desk wrote that "Euphoria feels like an album snatching at time. Whether that's Nineties hedonism or a moment of sweet escapism [...] Regardless, electronically or pounding live, Georgia's sound remains the beating heart of that nightlife." Adele Julia of The Line of Best Fit called Georgia bringing in producer Batmanglij "a partnership that is proven successful across Euphoric's ten tracks" and that the pair turn Georgia's "humble" Wurlitzer-composed tracks "into larger-than-life anthems that would feel at home amongst any club classic".

Uncut felt that Georgia is "able to fuse a few different eras of electro-pop to create songs whose high sheen doesn't impede their intimacy or immediacy". Max Freedman of Paste found that the album "absolutely works in its uptempo moments, though, because, when Georgia creates giddy pop music, she fully commits", and Otis Robinson of DIY described it as "grand, inspiring and convincing – and feels like summer love bottled up". Reviewing the album for Exclaim!, Vanessa Tam remarked that "at the core of each of these saturated, kaleidoscopic songs is that timeless sense of care" Georgia put into the songs to ensure they could be played at the piano.

AllMusic's Paul Simpson wrote that unlike Seeking Thrills, "there aren't any angular rhythms or gritty distortion to be heard. Still, there's plenty of busy percussion and yearning hooks, but with smoother, glossier production". Eric Torres of Pitchfork described the album as "a collection of chilled-out electro-pop that plays it a little too safe". Ben Devlin of MusicOMH found that "many of these tracks stretch longer than is common in modern pop, though this isn't always to the record's benefit". Sophie Williams of NME called the album "a mixed bag of soft, colourful pop" that "certainly could have been a much more potent album". Slant Magazine's Steve Erickson wrote that the album "can feel slightly distant" and that its "second half leans too heavily on slow, subdued songs, and Georgia's ostensibly personal lyrics rarely speak in anything but the most general terms".

== Track listing ==
All tracks are written by Georgia Barnes and Rostam Batmanglij; "All Night" and "So What" co-written by Justin Parker; "Keep On" co-written by Dan Carey.

Euphoric track listing
No.	Title	Length
1.	"It's Euphoric"	3:41
2.	"Give It Up for Love"	3:58
3.	"Some Things You'll Never Know"	2:49
4.	"Mountain Song"	4:29
5.	"All Night"	3:00
6.	"Live Like We're Dancing (Part II)"	3:45
7.	"The Dream"	3:51
8.	"Keep On"	4:10
9.	"Friends Will Never Let You Go"	2:51
10.	"So What"	3:39
Total length:		36:13

== Personnel ==
- Georgia Barnes – vocals (all tracks), production (tracks 2–8, 10)
- Rostam Batmanglij – production, engineering
- Dave Fridmann – mixing
- Michael Fridmann – mixing
- Joey Messina-Doerning – engineering

== Charts ==
Chart performance for Euphoric
Chart (2023)	Peak position
Scottish Albums (OCC)	24
UK Albums (OCC)	86
UK Independent Albums (OCC)	2
