= R.Y.C. (album) =

Studio album by Mura Masa
- Released: 17 January 2020
- Length: 37:50
- Label: Polydor; Anchor Point
- Producer: Mura Masa

Mura Masa chronology
Mura Masa (2017)	R.Y.C. (2020)	Demon Time (2022)

Singles from R.Y.C.
- 1. "I Don’t Think I Can Do This Again" Released: 21 August 2019; 2. "No Hope Generation" Released: 25 October 2019; 3. "Deal Wiv It" Released: 7 November 2019; 4. "Teenage Headache Dreams" Released: 7 January 2020

R.Y.C. is the second studio album by Guernsey-born music producer Alex Crossan, under his alias Mura Masa. It was released on 17 January 2020 by Polydor Records and Anchor Point Records. The album has guest features by Clairo, Slowthai, Tirzah and Ellie Rowsell.

The first single "No Hope Generation" was released 25 October 2019.

== Critical reception ==
Professional ratings
Aggregate scores
Source	Rating
AnyDecentMusic?	6.6/10
Metacritic	65/100
Review scores
Source	Rating
AllMusic	3/5 stars
Clash	6/10
DIY	4/5 stars
The Guardian	1/5 stars
MusicOMH	3.5/5 stars
Mojo	4/5 stars
NME	5/5 stars
Pitchfork	6.7/10
Q	3/5 stars

R.Y.C. was met with generally favourable reviews from critics. At Metacritic, which assigns a weighted average rating out of 100 to reviews from mainstream publications, it received an average score of 65, based on 12 reviews.

== Track listing ==
R.Y.C. track listing
No.	Title	Writer(s)	Length
1.	"Raw Youth Collage"	Alexander Crossan	3:38
2.	"No Hope Generation"	Crossan	3:54
3.	"I Don't Think I Can Do This Again" (with Clairo)	Crossan; Claire Cottrill; Thomas Miller	3:42
4.	"A Meeting at an Oak Tree" (with Ned Green)	Crossan; Ned Green	1:29
5.	"Deal Wiv It" (with Slowthai)	Crossan; Tyron Frampton	2:57
6.	"Vicarious Living Anthem"	Crossan; Fredrik Ball	2:05
7.	"In My Mind"	Crossan	5:31
8.	"Today" (featuring Tirzah)	Crossan; Tirzah Mastin	3:20
9.	"Live Like We're Dancing" (with Georgia)	Crossan; Georgia Barnes	4:10
10.	"Teenage Headache Dreams" (with Ellie Rowsell)	Crossan; Ellie Rowsell	4:43
11.	"Nocturne for Strings and a Conversation"	Crossan	2:21
Total length:			37:50

Notes

- "A Meeting at an Oak Tree" and "Vicarious Living Anthem" are stylized in all lowercase.
- "Nocturne for Strings and a Conversation" is stylized "(nocturne for strings and a conversation)"

== Personnel ==
Musicians

- Mura Masa – vocals (1, 2, 5–7, 9, 10), bass guitar (1–5, 10, 11), bass programming (1, 2, 4, 6–10), drum programming (1, 2, 4–10), guitar (1–8, 10), synthesizer programming (1, 2, 4–10), additional vocals (3, 8), programming (3, 11); drums, synthesizer (3); piano (8, 9); spoken word, strings (11)
- Kai Campos – programming, synthesizer (1)
- Clairo – vocals (3)
- Ned Green – spoken word (4)
- Slowthai – vocals (5)
- Tirzah – vocals (8)
- Georgia – vocals (9)
- Ellie Rowsell – vocals (10)

Technical

- Mura Masa – production, engineering
- Stuart Hawkes – mastering
- Nathan Boddy – mixing

Artwork

- Mura Masa – art direction, design
- Matt de Jong – art direction, design
- Darcy Haylor – photography

== Charts ==
Chart performance for R.Y.C.
Chart (2020)	Peak position
Belgian Albums (Ultratop Flanders)	187
Scottish Albums (OCC)	89
UK Albums (OCC)	23
UK Dance Albums (OCC)	7
