= Seeking Thrills =

Studio album by Georgia
- Released: 10 January 2020
- Length: 44:54
- Label: Domino
- Producers: Georgia; Sean Oakley; Mark Ralph

Georgia chronology
Georgia (2015)	Seeking Thrills (2020)	Euphoric (2023)

Singles from Seeking Thrills
- 1. "Feel It" Released: January 5, 2017; 2. "Mellow" Released: 20 September 2018; 3. "Started Out" Released: 1 November 2018; 4. "About Work the Dancefloor" Released: 28 March 2019; 5. "Never Let You Go" Released: 19 September 2019; 6. "24 Hours" Released: 7 January 2020

Professional ratings
Aggregate scores
Source	Rating
AnyDecentMusic?	7.5/10
Metacritic	78/100
Review scores
Source	Rating
AllMusic	4/5 stars
Clash	7/10
DIY	4/5 stars
Exclaim!	7/10
MusicOMH	4/5 stars
NME	4/5 stars
Paste	7.5/10
Pitchfork	6.8/10

Seeking Thrills is the second studio album by English singer-songwriter Georgia. It was released on 10 January 2020 under Domino Recording Company.

== Release and promotion ==
The first single "Started Out" was released on 1 November 2018. The next single, "About Work the Dancefloor", was released on 28 March 2019. Another single, titled "Never Let You Go", was released on 19 September 2019.

An expanded edition of the album, subtitled "The Ultimate Thrills Edition", was released digitally on 11 December 2020. It added a cover of Kate Bush's "Running Up That Hill", a reworking of "Feel It" featuring Yung Baby Tate, and 25 remixes.

== Critical reception ==
Seeking Thrills was met with generally favourable reviews from critics. At Metacritic, which assigns a weighted average rating out of 100 to reviews from mainstream music critics, the album holds an average score of 78, based on 18 reviews.

The album was shortlisted for the Mercury Prize 2020.

== Track listing ==
Standard edition
No.	Title	Writer(s)	Producer(s)	Length
1.	"Started Out"	Georgia Barnes; Mark Ralph	Georgia; Sean Oakley; Ralph	3:42
2.	"About Work the Dancefloor"	Barnes; Ralph	Georgia; Oakley; Ralph	3:28
3.	"Never Let You Go"	Barnes; Ralph	Oakley; Ralph; Georgia	3:47
4.	"24 Hours"	Barnes; Ralph	Georgia; Oakley; Ralph	3:05
5.	"Mellow" (feat. Shygirl)	Barnes; Sean Oakley; Blaine Muise	Georgia; Oakley	3:39
6.	"Till I Own It"	Barnes; Ralph	Georgia; Oakley; Ralph	3:49
7.	"I Can't Wait"	Barnes; Ralph	Georgia; Oakley; Ralph	3:08
8.	"Feel It"	Barnes	Georgia; Oakley; Ralph	3:52
9.	"Ultimate Sailor"	Barnes	Georgia; Oakley	3:36
10.	"Ray Guns"	Barnes; Ralph	Georgia; Oakley; Ralph	3:26
11.	"The Thrill" (feat. Maurice)	Barnes	Georgia; Ralph	4:27
12.	"Honey Dripping Sky"	Barnes	Georgia; Oakley	4:55
Total length:				44:54

Japan bonus track
No.	Title	Writer(s)	Producer(s)	Length
13.	"About Work the Dancefloor" (The Black Madonna remix)	Barnes; Ralph	Georgia; Oakley; Ralph	5:28
Total length:				50:32

Digital bonus track
No.	Title	Writer(s)	Producer(s)	Length
13.	"Never Let You Go" (alternative version)	Barnes; Ralph	Oakley; Ralph; Georgia	3:46

Spotify bonus tracks
No.	Title	Writer(s)	Producer(s)	Length
1.	"About Work the Dancefloor" (edit)	Barnes; Ralph	Georgia; Oakley; Ralph	3:14
2.	"24 Hours" (edit)	Barnes; Ralph	Georgia; Oakley; Ralph	2:46

== Charts ==
Chart performance for Seeking Thrills
Chart (2019)	Peak position
Belgian Albums (Ultratop Flanders)	139
Scottish Albums (Official Charts)	19
UK Albums (Official Charts)	24
UK Independent Albums (Official Charts)	1
