= Yeule =

Singaporean music project

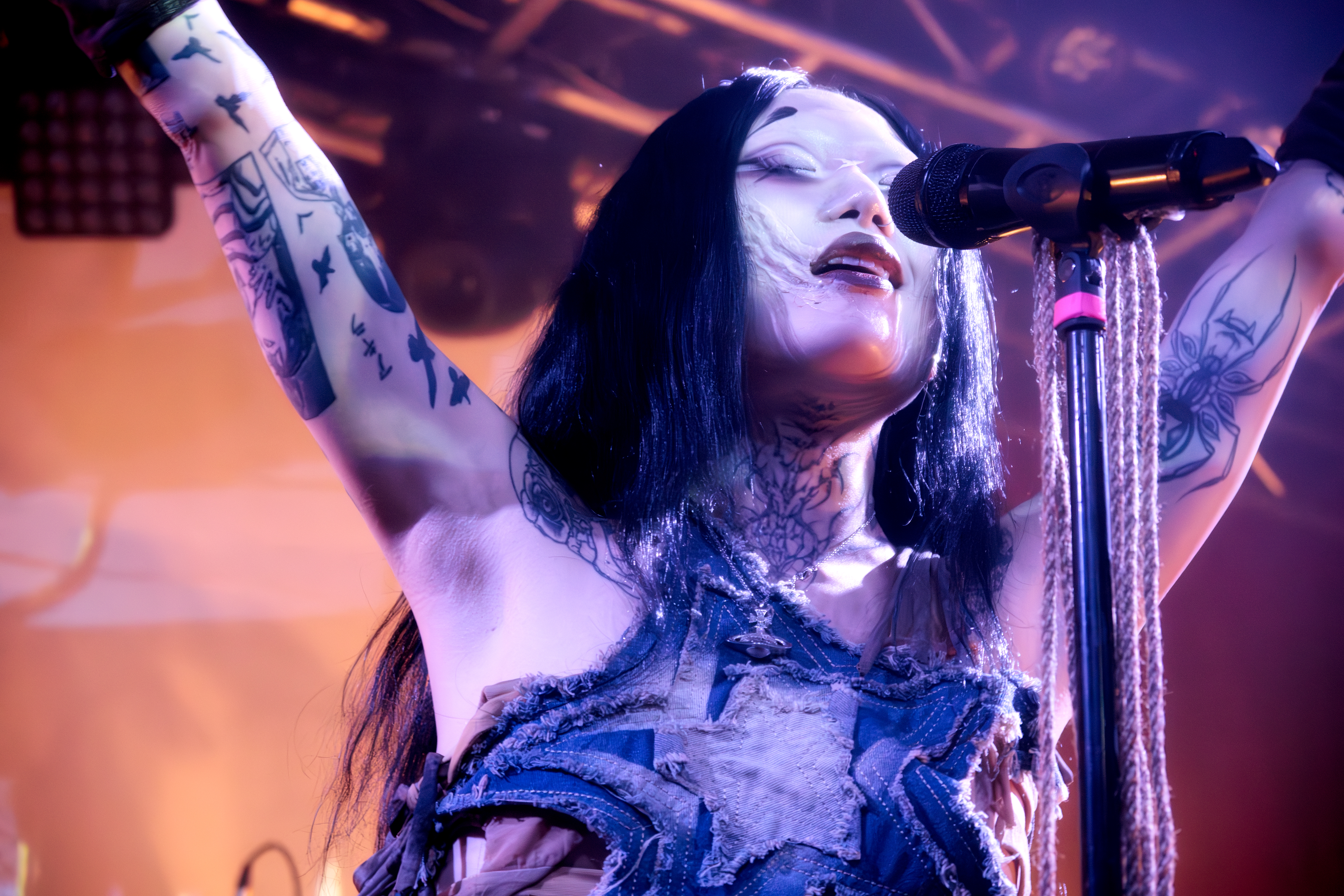
- Yeule performing in Seattle in 2023

Background information
- Also known as: Nat Ćmiel
- Born: Natasha Yelin Chang; December 16, 1997 (age 28); Singapore
- Genres: Synth-pop; ambient pop; glitch pop; shoegaze; noise pop; dream-pop
- Instruments: Vocals; guitar; synthesizers
- Years active: 2012–present
- Labels: Ninja Tune, Bayonet, Zoom Lens
- Website: https://www.yeule.jp/about

Yeule (/ˈjuːl/ YOOL; styled in lower case) is the musical project of Nat Ćmiel, (Note: This is also a self-chosen artist name and not a birth name. Ćmiel is a Polish surname, literally a local variant of 'trzmiel' (bumblebee) and reminiscent of 'ćma' (moth).) a Singaporean singer-songwriter and producer. Starting in 2012, they incorporate elements of ambient, glitch and post-pop. Their name is derived from Final Fantasy character Paddra Nsu-Yeul.

== Early life and education ==
Nat Ćmiel was born in Singapore where they attended school. They first started playing music at the age of 6 on their parents' Yamaha piano and learned classically although eventually dropped taking lessons, and wanted to explore something more challenging which led them to guitar and drums. Ćmiel initially started playing waltz pieces, though they soon moved on to songs from the soundtracks of Final Fantasy X and Kingdom Hearts. They later went on to sing in a jazz band under the name Riot Diet, covering songs from Ella Fitzgerald and the Pixies.

Growing up, feelings of loneliness and depression were present due in part to Ćmiel's nomadic upbringing. They found solace on the internet, which would influence their later works.

After graduating from high school, they applied to Central Saint Martins to study fashion communication and womenswear. Ćmiel graduated from Central Saint Martins in London with a degree in Fine Arts in 2020.

== Musical timeline ==
Ćmiel's first release under the Yeule title was their self-titled EP on March 3, 2014. Their name was inspired by the Final Fantasy XIII-2 character Paddra Nsu-Yeul, a reincarnating seeress with a fragmented soul; for Ćmiel, the character's "fate connotes the acceptance of mortality". On December 11, 2016, Ćmiel released their second EP, Pathos, which was dedicated to David Singh. Ćmiel followed up with the OST to interactive simulator game Lost Memories Dot Net, which was released on July 17, 2017.

On September 27, 2017, Ćmiel released their third EP, Coma. With regard to the writing, they said that "I wrote this album to commemorate the people I'd lost." The EP received a positive reception with Duncan Cooper of The Fader describing it as "dream-pop perfection". Ćmiel signed to Bayonet Records on July 17, 2019.

On October 25, 2019, Ćmiel released their debut studio album Serotonin II. On the process of creating the album they said that "Writing the record, I was dreadful. I didn't ask for much, I don't need to be happy. I just wanted to be content." The album received a positive critical reception with Jude Noel of Tiny Mix Tapes giving the album 4/5 and saying that "Melancholia aside, it's Serotonin II's impeccable sound design that has kept me coming back".

Ćmiel teased the release of their second album Glitch Princess via Bayonet Records with a track titled "My Name is Nat Ćmiel"—released at the end of 2020. The full album was released on February 4, 2022. It was qualified as "pioneering" by Colin Lodewick from Pitchfork and featured in their 'Best New Music' section with a critical score of 8.3.

In between "My Name Is Nat Ćmiel" and Glitch Princess, Ćmiel released the remix EP Serotonin X Remixes and the covers album Nuclear War Post X, the latter issued directly through their website as a limited-edition paperback art book with a download for the entire album.

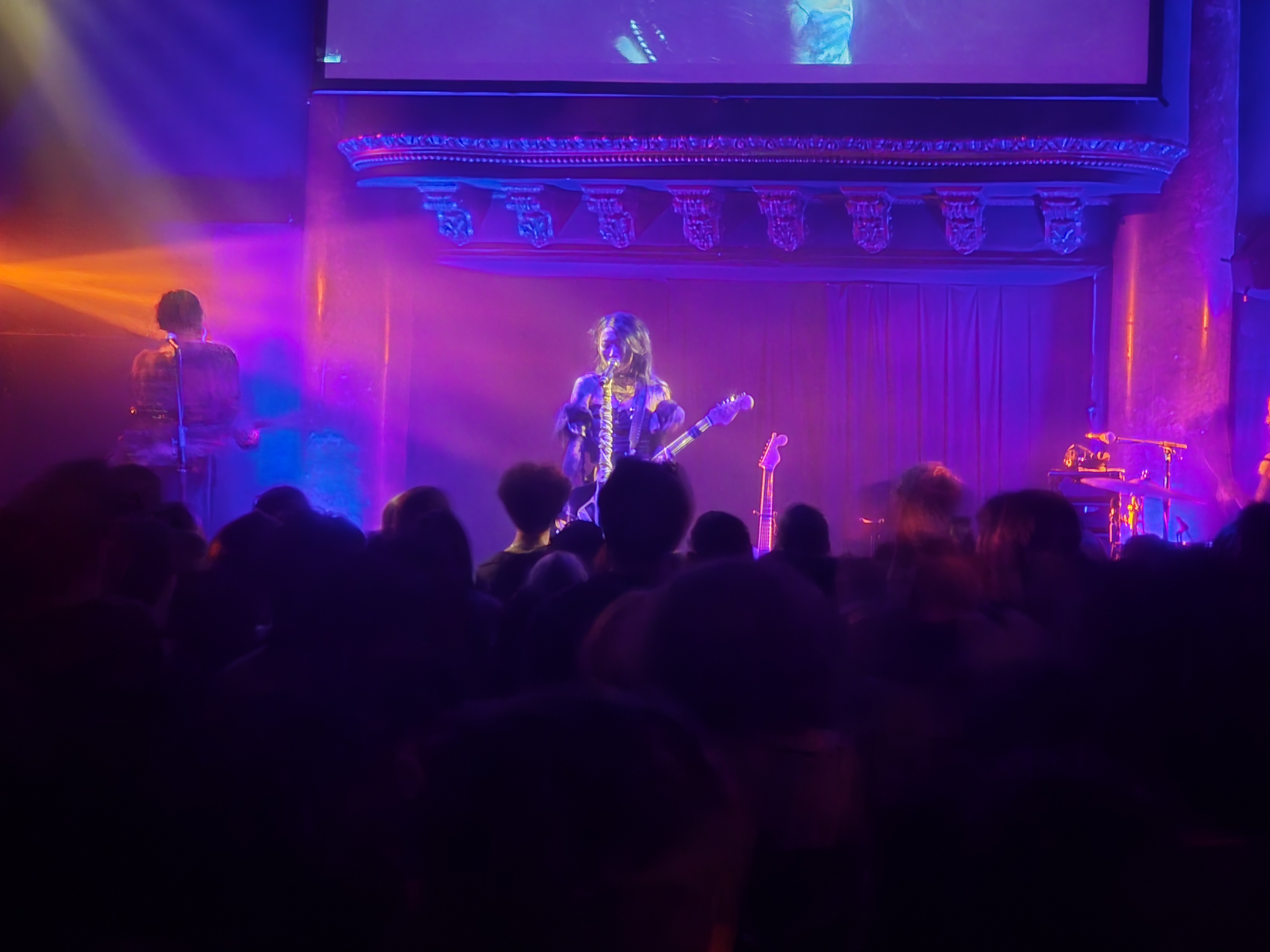
Yeule performing in 2025

Over the first weekend of May 2023, Yeule teased some images on their social media channels mentioning the date of May 10. On that date, Yeule premiered the video and released the single for their new song "Sulky Baby" and announced that they had signed to the Ninja Tune label. They told Rolling Stone, "The creative trajectory is shapeshifting, and Ninja Tune was the most versatile with their views on artistic direction as most of my creative pitches often tend to be fringe in conceptual aspects. I admire the team's work ethic and tastes, and they've also worked with other creatives I know and love to this day, it feels nice to be with them!" "Sulky Baby" was included on their third album, Softscars, which was released on September 22, 2023, to critical acclaim.

During October 2024, Yeule teased a new single, "Eko", being released on the 23rd the same month. On February 25, 2025, they released promotional material for a new single and an upcoming album, alongside a release date of March 3. The next day, a new single, "Skullcrusher", was officially announced, being produced along with Clams Casino and FITNESSS. On March 3, Yeule announced their fourth studio album, Evangelic Girl Is a Gun, and it was released on May 30, 2025.

== Music style and influences ==
Ćmiel's music has been described as a variety of categories including: "electronic post-pop", avant-pop and experimental pop. Serotonin II was labeled as an ambient album and received comparisons to Enya's music and Grimes' album Visions (2012). Glitch Princess is a glitch pop album with influences of emo pop, spoken word and ambient music. Releases following Glitch Princess explored guitar-based alternative music. Softscars is a shoegaze album that has also been considered as a dream pop and pop rock record. Evangelic Girl Is a Gun combines eclectic influences from several genres including pop, metal, EDM, trip hop, shoegaze and sludge metal. Ćmiel's musical influences draws inspiration from '90s and 2000s alternative acts such as My Chemical Romance, Avril Lavigne, Hole, Radiohead, the Pixies and the Smashing Pumpkins. Some of their favorite albums are My Chemical Romance's Three Cheers for Sweet Revenge (2004), Avril Lavigne's Let Go (2002) and Under My Skin (2004); and the Smashing Pumpkins' Mellon Collie and the Infinite Sadness (1995) and Siamese Dream (1993).

== Discography ==
Yeule discography
- Studio albums: 4
- EPs: 7
- Soundtrack albums: 2
- Singles: 23

=== Studio albums ===
| Title | Album details | Peak chart positions | | | |
| Title | Album details | SCO | UK Indie | UK Album Down. | UK Albums Sales |
|---|---|---|---|---|---|
| Serotonin II | Released: October 25, 2019; Label: Bayonet; Format: LP, CD, digital download, streaming, cassette | — | — | — | — |
| Glitch Princess | Released: February 4, 2022; Label: Bayonet; Format: LP, CD, digital download, streaming, cassette | 96 | 22 | — | — |
| Softscars | Released: September 22, 2023; Label: Ninja Tune; Format: LP, CD, digital download, streaming, cassette | — | 41 | 57 | — |
| Evangelic Girl Is a Gun | Released: May 30, 2025; Label: Ninja Tune; Format: LP, CD, digital download, streaming, cassette | 29 | 18 | 56 | 40 |
"—" denotes album that did not chart or was not released

=== Soundtrack extended plays ===
| Title | Album details |
|---|---|
| Lost Memories Dot Net | Released: July 17, 2017; Label: Self released; Format: Digital download, streaming |
| The Overture of Prototype | Released: January 8, 2024; Label: Self released; Format: Digital download, streaming |

=== Extended plays ===
| Title | EP details |
|---|---|
| Yeule | Released: March 3, 2014; Label: Zoom Lens; Format: Digital download, steaming |
| Pathos | Released: December 11, 2016; Label: Self released; Format: Digital download, streaming |
| Coma | Released: September 27, 2017; Label: Zoom Lens |
| Serotonin X Remixes | Released: July 30, 2021; Label: Bayonet; Format: Digital download, streaming |
| A+E | Scheduled: December 4, 2026; Label: Warner Records; Format: CD, Digital download, streaming |

=== Singles ===
| Title | Year | Album |
|---|---|---|
| "Eva (Demo)" | 2018 | Non-album single |
| "Pocky Boy" | 2019 | Serotonin II |
| "Pretty Bones" | 2019 | Serotonin II |
| "Pixel Affection" | 2019 | Serotonin II |
| "Poison Arrow" | 2019 | Serotonin II |
| "My Name Is Nat Ćmiel" | 2020 | Glitch Princess |
| "The Things They Did for Me Out of Love" | 2021 | Glitch Princess |
| "Don't Be So Hard on Your Own Beauty" | 2021 | Glitch Princess |
| "Friendly Machine" | 2021 | Glitch Princess |
| "Too Dead Inside" | 2022 | Glitch Princess |
| "Sulky Baby" | 2023 | Softscars |
| "Dazies" | 2023 | Softscars |
| "Fish in the Pool" | 2023 | Softscars |
| "Ghosts" | 2023 | Softscars |
| "Inferno" | 2023 | Softscars |
| "Softscars" | 2023 | Softscars |
| "Anthems for a Seventeen Year-Old Girl" | 2024 | I Saw the TV Glow (Original Soundtrack) |
| "Eko" | 2024 | Evangelic Girl Is a Gun |
| "Skullcrusher" | 2025 | Evangelic Girl Is a Gun |
| "Evangelic Girl Is a Gun" | 2025 | Evangelic Girl Is a Gun |
| "Dudu" | 2025 | Evangelic Girl Is a Gun |
| "Hystérique" | 2026 | A+E |
| "Lovepill" | 2026 | A+E |

=== Collaborations ===
| Title | Artist | Year | Album |
|---|---|---|---|
| "Reciprocation" (featuring Yeule) | Oh My Muu | 2015 | Self Help |
| "Dance & Kill" (with Yeule) | LLLL | 2017 | Chains Phase 1: Resent |
| "Memories" (with Yeule) | LLLL | 2017 | Chains Phase 2: Remain |
| "Seal" (with Yeule) | LLLL | 2017 | Chains Phase 2: Remain |
| "Indefinite Grounds" (with Yeule) | LLLL | 2018 | Chains Phase 4: Resemblance |
| "Breathless" (with Yeule) | LLLL | 2020 | Impure |
| "Akuma des Akum" (yeule Remix) | Urbangarde | 2021 | Tokyopop2 |
| "Deadlines" (yeule Remix) | Car Seat Headrest | 2021 | Madlo: Remixes |
| "Shell" (with Yeule) | Tohji | 2022 | T-Mix |
| "Bluff" (yeule and Kin Leonn Remix) | Yunè Pinku | 2022 | Non-album single |
| "Easy Prey" (yeule and Kin Leonn Remix) | Moderat | 2023 | Even More D4ta |
| "Something Other Than Years" (with Yeule) | Lucinda Chua | 2023 | Yian |
| "Slugs" (yeule and Kin Leonn Remix) | Slow Pulp | 2024 | Non-album single |
| "We Are Making Out" (featuring Yeule) | Mura Masa | 2024 | Curve 1 |
| "Like a Bird" (featuring Yeule) | Baasch | 2024 | Lipstick on the Glass (Original Motion Picture Soundtrack) |
