= Doorman (song) =

Single by Slowthai and Mura Masa

from the album Nothing Great About Britain
- Released: 19 November 2018
- Genre: Hip-hop; punk rap; punk rock; lo-fi
- Length: 3:04
- Label: Method Records
- Songwriters: Tyron Frampton; Alexander Crossan
- Producer: Mura Masa

Slowthai singles chronology
"Rainbow" (2016)	"Doorman" (2018)	"Peace Of Mind" (2019)

Mura Masa singles chronology
"Complicated" (2018)	"Doorman" (2018)	"I Don't Think I Can Do This Again" (2019)

Music video
- "Doorman" on YouTube

"Doorman" is a song by British rapper Slowthai and British electronic music producer Mura Masa. It was released on 19 November 2018 as the lead single from Slowthai's debut studio album, Nothing Great About Britain. The song was written by both artists, and produced by Mura Masa.

== Background ==
The inspiration for the song came after Slowthai saw a 4.5-million-pound painting on a wall, which exposed the wealth disparity between the working and the ruling class. The next day, he and Mura Masa wrote Doorman, keeping all the original vocal takes in order to preserve the post-punk, rebellious energy they aimed to capture.

== Music video ==
The music video for the song, directed by The Rest, was released onto YouTube on 7 January 2019. It was inspired by and contains several references to the Danny Boyle's movie Trainspotting.

== Live performances ==
Slowthai performed Doorman at Mercury Prize ceremony in September 2019. During the performance, he held a fake severed head of British prime minister Boris Johnson on stage, prompting controversy. He also performed the song on Later... with Jools Holland in November 2019.

== Certifications ==
Region	Certification	Certified units/sales
United Kingdom (BPI)	Silver	200,000^{‡}
^{‡} Sales+streaming figures based on certification alone.
