= Mura Masa (album) =

Studio album by Mura Masa
- Released: 14 July 2017
- Recorded: 2014–2016
- Genres: Pop; electronic; hip hop; funk
- Length: 45:17
- Labels: Universal Music; Polydor; Interscope; Downtown; Anchor Point
- Producer: Mura Masa

Mura Masa chronology
Someday Somewhere EP (2015)	Mura Masa (2017)	R.Y.C (2020)

Singles from Mura Masa
- 1. "What If I Go?" Released: 7 April 2016; 2. "Lovesick" Released: 30 September 2016; 3. "1 Night" Released: 17 March 2017; 4. "All Around the World" Released: 17 May 2017; 5. "Second 2 None" / "Blu" Released: 29 June 2017; 6. "Nuggets" / "Helpline" Released: 7 July 2017

Mura Masa is the debut studio album by Guernsey-born music producer Alex Crossan, under his alias Mura Masa. It was released on 14 July 2017 by Polydor, Interscope, Downtown and Anchor Point Records. The album was produced and recorded by Crossan from 2014 to 2016, and has guest features by A. K. Paul, ASAP Rocky, Bonzai, Charli XCX, Christine and the Queens, Damon Albarn, Desiigner, Jamie Lidell, NAO and Tom Tripp. It received nominations for Best Dance/Electronic Album and Best Recording Package at the 60th Annual Grammy Awards.

It is a pop, electronic, hip hop and funk album, incorporating trap, bubblegum and electronic sub-genres such as ambient, disco, dubstep, house and tropical house. It was supported by six singles: "What If I Go?", "Lovesick", "1 Night", "All Around the World", "Second 2 None" / "Blu" and "Nuggets" / "Helpline". Upon release, it received positive reviews by critics, and debuted at number 19 on the UK Albums Chart and at 192 on the US Billboard 200.

== Background ==
After playing guitar, bass, drums and singing in local punk, hardcore, deathcore and gospel bands, Alex Crossan started self-producing at the age of 15, "searching for samples on YouTube and other corners of the internet". At 16, he started to make electronic songs using Ableton Live, and began uploading them to SoundCloud the following year, under the alias Mura Masa.

He posted his debut mixtape Soundtrack to a Death to SoundCloud, later released by Jakarta Records on 17 November 2014. The following year, he released his debut EP, Someday Somewhere, on 10 April. He announced in December 2016 that the follow-up would be an album titled To Fall Out of Love To. He later changed the name to Mura Masa.

== Recording ==
Crossan told about the recording of "Lovesick": "The first thing he [ASAP Rocky] said was that it made him feel really tropical, like he was in Ibiza or something and I was like, 'OK let's roll with that'. But then I said to him that it was about being stupid and feeling lovesick and hanging over a girl and he brought that to it as well. It was super fun, we hung out, smoked cigarettes, talked about fashion and Tame Impala."

He also told about the recording of "1 Night": "I wanted to send Charli something that was poppier for me. But more of a left turn for her. I mean, she's a pop star and I'm not. You could say I make pop music, but there's something else going on there was well—it's not just brazen pop. But I thought it'd be fun to meet her halfway". "Second 2 None" was recorded in few takes, with Crossan adding Christine and the Queens' harmonies after production.

Crossan recorded the instrumental of "All Around the World" in 2016. While in Interscope Studios, Crossan received an email from "Desiigner's people" with the choruses and ad-libs for the track. Crossan and Desiigner worked on the song's lyrics later. "Firefly" was recorded in 2015 for Someday Somewhere. It received attention when Crossan alleged the song was copied in Ariana Grande's "Be Alright". As a result, Grande credited Crossan (as "Alexander Crossan") and Neo Joshua, the track's songwriters, as co-writers of "Be Alright".

== Music ==
The album's sound is described as pop, EDM, disco, hip hop, funk, house and tropical house. It also draws influences from ambient, trap, dubstep and bubblegum. Crossan said this sound "comes from geographical isolation more than anything".

== Release ==
"Love for That", featuring vocals from British synth-pop musician Shura, was released as a buzz single for the album in October 2015, but did not make the album's final cut. The album's lead single, "What If I Go?", was released in April 2016. The album's second single "Lovesick", which features vocals from ASAP Rocky, was released in September 2016. "Lovesick" was originally released as an instrumental, entitled "Lovesick Fuck", and was featured on Mura Masa's EP Someday Somewhere.

== Critical reception ==
Professional ratings
Aggregate scores
Source	Rating
AnyDecentMusic?	7.3/10
Metacritic	78/100
Review scores
Source	Rating
AllMusic	3.5/5 stars
The Guardian	4/5 stars
The New York Times	4/5 stars
Mojo	3/5 stars
NME	4/5 stars
Pitchfork	7.7/10
The Skinny	5/5 stars
Tiny Mix Tapes	1.5/5 marks

At Metacritic, which assigns a normalised rating out of 100 to reviews from mainstream publications, Mura Masa received an average score of 78, based on 13 reviews, indicating "generally favourable reviews".

In his three-and-a-half star rated review for AllMusic, Paul Simpson claims that, "Musically, Crossan's work is a mix of various 'future' styles (bass music, trap, house, etc.), and he often combines light, sunny, island-like tones with lovesick, melancholy themes. His production style is expressive and detailed yet a bit restrained, rather than going for over the top maximalism at every opportunity."

=== Accolades ===
Accolades for Mura Masa
Publication	Accolade	Year	Rank	Ref.
Billboard	25 Best & Worst Album Covers of 2017	2017	Best	
Drowned in Sound	Favourite Albums of 2017	2017	81	
NME	NME's Albums of the Year 2017	2017	34	

== Track listing ==
Mura Masa track listing
No.	Title	Writer(s)	Length
1.	"Messy Love"	Alexander Crossan	3:45
2.	"Nuggets" (featuring Bonzai)	Crossan; Cassia O'Reilly; Jason Silva	3:29
3.	"Lovesick" (featuring ASAP Rocky)	Crossan; Rakim Mayers	3:12
4.	"1 Night" (featuring Charli XCX)	Crossan; Charlotte Aitchison; Piero Piccioni; Patrik Berger; Fredrik Berger	3:27
5.	"All Around the World" (featuring Desiigner)	Crossan; Sidney Selby	2:44
6.	"Give Me the Ground"	Crossan	1:07
7.	"What If I Go?" (featuring Bonzai)	Crossan; Rebecca Louise Jones; O'Reilly	3:15
8.	"Firefly" (featuring Nao)	Crossan; Neo Jessica Joshua	3:48
9.	"Nothing Else!" (featuring Jamie Lidell)	Crossan; Jamie Lidderdale; Jeffrey Ziegler; Joshua; Mary Lattimore; Gian Piccioni	3:26
10.	"Helpline" (featuring Tom Tripp)	Crossan; Thomas Eghator; Dan Kempthorne; Christopher Bell; Lance Mercer; Steven Ross	3:24
11.	"Second 2 None" (featuring Christine and the Queens)	Crossan; Héloïse Letissier	4:10
12.	"Who Is It Gonna B" (featuring A. K. Paul)	Crossan; Anup Paul	4:58
13.	"Blu" (featuring Damon Albarn)	Crossan; Albarn	4:32
Total length:			45:17

Notes

- "Lovesick" is stylised as "Love$ick".
- "Give Me the Ground" is stylised as "give me The ground".

Sample credits

- "1 Night" contains samples of "Tahiti", composed and performed by Piero Piccioni.
- "Firefly" contains samples of "Some Cut", performed by Trillville featuring Cutty.
- "All Around the World" contains samples of "Who U Wit?", performed by Lil Jon and The East Side Boyz.
- "Nuggets" contains samples of "Love Is a Drug", performed by Shots of Awe.
- "Second 2 None" contains samples of "Amen, Brother", performed by The Winstons.

== Personnel ==
Musicians

- Mura Masa – guitar (tracks 1, 2, 7, 9, 10, 12, 13), piano (1, 3, 8), programming (1–3, 5, 9, 10, 12, 13), synthesizer (1–5, 7, 9, 10, 12, 13), vocals (1, 6), drum programming (8), synthesizer programming (8, 11)
- Bonzai – vocals (2, 7)
- ASAP Rocky – vocals (3)
- Charli XCX – vocals (4)
- Desiigner – vocals (5)
- Matt Calvert – guitar (6)
- Nao – vocals (8)
- Jamie Lidell – vocals (9)
- Tom Tripp – vocals (10)
- Christine and the Queens – vocals (11)
- A. K. Paul – vocals (12)
- Damon Albarn – vocals (13)

Technical

- Mura Masa – production (all tracks), engineering (8)
- Stuart Hawkes – mastering
- Lexxx – mixing (1, 2, 4–13)
- Hector Delgado – mixing (3)
- Alex Dromgoole – mixing (3)
- Tom Kahre – engineering (5)
- Stephen Sedgwick – engineering (13)

Artwork

- Mura Masa – art direction, design
- Matt de Jong – art direction, design
- Yoni Lappin – photography, visuals
- Salim Adam – photography, visuals

== Charts ==
=== Weekly charts ===
Weekly chart performance for Mura Masa
Chart (2017)	Peak position
Australian Albums (ARIA)	49
Belgian Albums (Ultratop Flanders)	13
Belgian Albums (Ultratop Wallonia)	132
Dutch Albums (Album Top 100)	55
German Albums (Offizielle Top 100)	86
Irish Albums (IRMA)	50
Japanese Albums (Billboard Japan)	82
New Zealand Albums (RMNZ)	35
Scottish Albums (Official Charts)	85
UK Albums (Official Charts)	19
US Billboard 200	192
US Top Dance Albums (Billboard)	6

=== Year-end charts ===
Year-end chart performance for Mura Masa
Chart (2017)	Position
Belgian Albums (Ultratop Flanders)	165

== Certifications ==
Certifications for Mura Masa
Region	Certification	Certified units/sales
United Kingdom (BPI)	Silver	60,000^{‡}
^{‡} Sales+streaming figures based on certification alone.
