= Remembrance (EP) =

EP by Suicideyear
- Released: September 23, 2014
- Recorded: 2014
- Genre: Trap; experimental
- Length: 30:48
- Label: Software
- Producer: James Richard Prudhomme

Suicideyear chronology
Japan (2013)	Remembrance (2014)	Dream 727 (2015)

Singles from Remembrance
- 1. "Hope Building A" Released: July 9, 2014

Remembrance is the first extended play of Suicideyear, a project by American producer James Richard Prudhomme. Issued in September 2014, it was the first record of the project to be released under Daniel Lopatin's Mexican Summer label Software. Reviews of the eight-track release from music critics were generally favorable, some reviewers praising its uplifting and emotional style of trap music uncommon in the internet music scene.

== Background and composition ==
Prudhomme began working on Remembrance in Florida in mid-2014. This was shortly before one night when moving from the state to his home territory that his house burned down, which was "one of the longest, most emotionally trying nights of his life" as Impose magazine described. As a result of the incident, Prudhomme was forced to drop out of his school and live only with couches and minimum wage from working at Little Caesars. As he recalled, "It really propelled me to do a lot of shit that I wasn’t ready to do, like I had to look for a place to live real quick. I had to get a job immediately. Like I had to do a bunch of shit.” He had "felt a lot of feelings" and wanted to migrate back to where he started recording Remembrance, which he described as a "really beautiful place".

The staccato-note percussion and fast-paced click tracks on Remembrance represent Prudhomme's bitterness during this period. However, he also had hope that his life would get back together and that he could learn how to improve the music he was producing, a calm feeling that was also a heavy contributor to the album's sound. Loud and Quiet described Remembrance's overall instrumentation as consisting of "shimmering synth-pad soundscapes, soaring arpeggios and razor sharp, syncopated hip-hop beats". Categorizing it as an experimental album, Resident Advisor noted the album's sounds, such as the ghost-like vocal snippets on "Daniel" and "Savior", to have the same feel as the 1980s Fairlight CMI-programmed textures that were present in music by The Art of Noise. Both Tiny Mix Tapes and Pitchfork Media honored the extended play for being a different take on trap music, the latter writing that "Prudhomme takes very specific elements of this production, zooms in, and amplifies them until they become something else, something he can call his own." Pitchfork also compared the melodic structure of the tracks to that of intelligent dance music released in the late 1990s, and noted the record to have the "slow-burn anxiety" of the works of producer and DJ Zaytoven.

== Release and promotion ==
On July 9, 2014, "Hope Building A" was released as Remembrance's lead single, as well as a video for the song directed by Serena Forghieri. A music video for the title track premiered on September 17, 2014, which depicts Prudhomme driving around his city. The extended play was released on September 23, 2014 by Daniel Lopatin's Mexican Summer imprint Software, and was the first Suicideyear record to be released on the label. The vinyl album was a limited edition release of only 1,000 copies. Remembrance was later released with Suicideyear's first mixtape Japan (2013) as part of the album Dream 727 (2015).

== Critical reception ==
Professional ratings
Aggregate scores
Source	Rating
Metacritic	68/100
Review scores
Source	Rating
Clash	8/10
Loud and Quiet	8/10
Mojo	3/5 stars
Pitchfork Media	7.3/10
Resident Advisor	4/5
Spectrum Culture	3.75/5
Tiny Mix Tapes	4/5 stars

Remembrance garnered generally favorable reviews from music journalists. Some reviewers, including Tiny Mix Tapes critic Gage Taylor and Mark Richardson of Pitchfork Media praised the album for making a different type of trap music from what was common by acts associated with the internet music scene, the rare type being trap music that creates its own emotion and is optimistic. Taylor and Richardson especially praised the last track, which was a cover of "When You Sleep" by My Bloody Valentine; Richardson wrote, "MBV covers can go wrong so easily, but Prudhomme finds something new in the song, an iciness and feeling of isolation that move in opposition to the warmth found on the most oceanic of albums".

Spectrum Culture called Remembrance an improvement over Suicideyear's mixtape Japan: "Japan could lean to the more kawaii sillier side of things at times, but Remembrance, more often than not, turns gorgeous." AllMusic's Paul Simpson was another critic that called Remembrance better than Japan, noting its more "complex" arrangement and introduction of new sounds to Suicideyear's style. A reviewer for The Wire had a more mixed opinion towards the album, writing that it sounds "somewhere between being tentative and caught in a frozen, allegorical state of sketchiness, turning the sleepy head of bedroom pop into a death's head."

== Track listing ==
All tracks written and produced by James Richard Prudhomme and mastered by Heba Kadry at Timeless Mastering in Brooklyn, New York. Additional writing credits are noted in the track listing.

Remembrance – Standard version
No.	Title	Additional writer	Length
1.	"Don't Care About Death Because I Smoke"		4:48
2.	"Daniel"		3:14
3.	"Caroline"		3:31
4.	"Hope Building A"		3:51
5.	"Savior"		2:21
6.	"US"		4:45
7.	"Remembrance"		3:57
8.	"When You Sleep"	Kevin Shields	4:21
Total length:			30:48

== Release history ==
Region	Date	Format(s)	Label
Worldwide	September 23, 2014	Digital download; vinyl	Software
