= Suicideyear =

American record producer

James Richard Prudhomme
- Also known as: Suicideyear
- Born: February 15, 1995 (age 31)
- Origin: Baton Rouge, Louisiana, United States
- Genres: Phonk; electronic music
- Years active: 2012–present

James Richard Prudhomme (born February 15, 1995), better known as Suicideyear, is an American electronic music composer, DJ and songwriter from Baton Rouge, Louisiana.

== Musical career ==
Prudhomme rose to popularity at the age of 17 with several unofficial remixes of hip-hop artists such as The Pack, Danny Brown & Main Attrakionz. He released his self-titled debut mixtape in 2012, which included a remix of Three Six Mafia's "Late Night Tip". In May 2013, Prudhomme released his second original mixtape titled Japan, a conceptual piece detailing the last 7 months of his life. The track "CCCXXV" was used by Swedish artist Yung Lean for "Hurt", the lead single from his debut mixtape Unknown Death 2002. Shortly after Japan's release, Prudhomme was sought by Parisian artist Brodinski after airing several tracks on BBC Radio 1. Suicideyear released the single "Finale" as a 12’ split on Brodinski's Bromance label on June 3, 2013, and he's contributed several tracks to Bromance's Homieland compilation releases.

Suicideyear signed to Software Recording Co. in July 2014 after Japan caught the ear of label head Oneohtrix Point Never. Along with the signing, Software announced the release of his debut EP, Remembrance. The project was written and produced between Florida and Louisiana, reflecting on themes of love and loss against the backdrop of the deep American south. The release displays emotions of melancholy and ends with a cover of My Bloody Valentine’s “When You Sleep.” Pitchfork stated, “Suicideyear combines the clean melodic lines of late-1990s IDM with the slow-burn anxiety of Zaytoven.” Software Label re-issued Japan on vinyl and as a dual CD alongside Remembrance titled DREAM 727 in March 2015. The release included a cover of Britney Spears’ “Everytime.”

A vocal version of his track "Scarr", featuring UK grime MC K9 was released following DREAM 727. The single was accompanied by a video directed by Jim Alexander.

Prudhomme released a collaborative mixtape with fellow Louisiana producer Outthepound, titled "Brothers" on December 28, 2016. The 23-minute piece marked the return from a near 2-year hiatus. In the Spring of 2017, Suicideyear signed to the Scottish label LuckyMe. He released a 6 track EP titled "Hate Songs" on July 28, 2017.

== Discography ==
=== Albums ===
- Color the Weather (2018, LuckyMe)

=== EPs ===
- Remembrance (2014, Software Recording Co.)
- Hate Songs (2017, LuckyMe)

=== Mixtapes ===
- Suicideyear (2012, self-released)
- REMIXESS (2013, self-released)
- Japan (2013, self-released)
- 'HAVEFUN 001' (2013, self-released)
- Brothers (2016, self-released) (with Outthepound)

=== Singles ===
- "Finale" (2013, Savoir Faire / Bromance)
- "Scarr" (feat. K9)" (2015, self-released)
- "Suicide Year (feat. WEEDMANE)" (2020)

=== Compilations ===
- Dream 727 (2015, Software Recording Co.)

=== Remixes ===
- Saint Pepsi – "Fiona Coyne" (Suicideyear Remix) – Carpark Records
- Jacques Greene – "After Life After Party: (Suicideyear Remix) – LuckyMe
- Mikky Ekko – "Mourning Doves" (Suicideyear Remix featuring Denzel Curry) – RCA
- Dark0 – "Abrasion" (Suicideyear Remix) – Rinse
- 18+ – "Cake" (Suicideyear remix) – Houndstooth
- Autre Ne Veut – “Panic Room (Suicideyear Remix)” – Downtown Records
