= Glitch Princess =

2022 album by Yeule

Studio album by Yeule
- Released: February 4, 2022
- Length: 327:18
- Label: Bayonet
- Producer: Yeule; Kin Leonn; Danny L Harle; Mura Masa

Yeule chronology
Serotonin II (2019)	Glitch Princess (2022)	Softscars (2023)

Singles from Glitch Princess
- 1. "My Name is Nat Ćmiel" Released: December 31, 2020; 2. "The Things They Did for Me Out of Love" Released: September 28, 2021; 3. "Don't Be So Hard on Your Own Beauty" Released: October 7, 2021; 4. "Friendly Machine" Released: November 4, 2021; 5. "Too Dead Inside" Released: January 13, 2022

Professional ratings
Aggregate scores
Source	Rating
Metacritic	85/100
Review scores
Source	Rating
AllMusic	3.5/5 stars
Clash	9/10
DIY	4/5 stars
The Line of Best Fit	9/10
musicOMH	4/5 stars
Pitchfork	8.3/10

Glitch Princess is the second studio album by Singaporean musician Yeule, released on February 4, 2022. The digital version of the album clocks in at more than five hours of music, primarily due to the inclusion of the final track, "The Things They Did for Me Out of Love", a four-hour ambient track. The album received critical acclaim from music critics.

== Track listing ==
All tracks are written by and produced by Yeule, except tracks 2, 4, 8, 9 and 13 produced by Danny L Harle, track 9 co-produced by Mura Masa, and track 6 produced by Kin Leonn.

Glitch Princess track listing
No.	Title	Length
1.	"My Name Is Nat Ćmiel"	2:51
2.	"Electric"	3:16
3.	"Flowers Are Dead"	4:16
4.	"Eyes"	4:09
5.	"Perfect Blue" (featuring Tohji)	2:59
6.	"Don't Be So Hard on Your Own Beauty"	3:12
7.	"Fragments"	4:14
8.	"Too Dead Inside"	3:26
9.	"Bites on My Neck"	4:49
10.	"I <3 U"	3:59
11.	"Friendly Machine"	3:47
12.	"Mandy"	2:20
Total length:		43:18

Digital version
No.	Title	Length
13.	"The Things They Did for Me Out of Love"	284:00
Total length:		327:18

Japanese edition bonus tracks
No.	Title	Length
13.	"Fragments" (instrumental)	4:44
14.	"Electric" (instrumental)	3:17
15.	"I <3 U" (instrumental)	4:00
16.	"Too Dead Inside" (instrumental)	3:25
17.	"Bites on My Neck" (instrumental)	4:49
18.	"Friendly Machine" (instrumental)	4:08
Total length:		67:41

== Personnel ==
=== Musicians ===
- Yeule – writing, vocals, production (production on tracks 1, 3, 5–7, 10–12); VFX/editing (as Nat Ćmiel)
- Danny L Harle – writing, production (on tracks 2, 4, 8, 9 and 13)
- Mura Masa – writing, production (track 9)
- Kin Leonn – writing, production (track 6)
- Tohji – featured musician (5)

=== Technical ===
- Heba Kadry – mastering
- Geoff Swan – mixing

=== Art ===
- EG Huang – logo design
- Neil Krug – album art

== Charts ==
Chart performance for Glitch Princess
Chart (2022)	Peak position
Scottish Albums (OCC)	96
UK Independent Albums (OCC)	22
