= Softscars =

Studio album by Yeule
- Released: September 22, 2023
- Genre: Alternative rock; shoegaze; glitch pop; indietronica; dream pop
- Length: 40:11
- Label: Ninja Tune
- Producer: Nat Ćmiel; Chris Greatti; Kin Leonn; Mura Masa

Yeule chronology
Glitch Princess (2022)	Softscars (2023)	Evangelic Girl Is a Gun (2025)

Singles from Softscars
- 1. "Sulky Baby" Released: May 10, 2023; 2. "Dazies" Released: July 12, 2023; 3. "Fish in the Pool" Released: July 12, 2023; 4. "Ghosts" Released: August 9, 2023; 5. "Inferno" Released: August 31, 2023; 6. "Softscars" Released: September 14, 2023

Softscars (stylized in all lowercase) is the third studio album by Singaporean musician Yeule. It was released on September 22, 2023, through Ninja Tune. Starting in May, with "Sulky Baby", six of the 12 tracks were released as singles prior to the album's release.

== Background and singles ==
Yeule wrote and co-produced the album alongside Kin Leonn. Additional production was handled by Mura Masa and Chris Greatti. In accordance with the concept of the album, each track signifies a scar tied to Yeule's past. They took the "metaphor" of the scar to stand for each song but "each scar remains soft". Yeule also opined that "time never heals a scar completely" but the pain eases up with time, leaving behind a visible mark. They are convinced that the things their ancestors experienced "got passed down", calling it trauma. On the upside, the scar gives them the feeling of "being protected". Writing the record, they were inside their head, revealing that it hurt "but it was important".

Yeule released several singles ahead of the album: "Sulky Baby" on May 11, "Dazies" and "Fish in the Pool" on July 12, "Ghosts" on August 9 and "Inferno" on August 31. They shared the "glitchy, effervescent" title track on September 14, the inspiration behind it being the "garden" of their mind, which is "dark and prickly sweet and sticky". The song explores the core theme of the album, the marks and scars of past experiences. Yeule announced the album and its accompanying North American tour on July 12. While the album was released digitally through Bayonet on September 22, physical copies were available on October 6 via Ninja Tune, to whom they signed earlier that year.

== Critical reception ==
Professional ratings
Aggregate scores
Source	Rating
Metacritic	83/100
Review scores
Source	Rating
AllMusic	4/5 stars
Beats Per Minute	79%
DIY	3.5/5 stars
The Line of Best Fit	8/10
NME	4/5 stars
Pitchfork	8.5/10
PopMatters	7/10
Slant Magazine	4/5 stars

Softscars received a score of 83 out of 100 on review aggregator Metacritic based on 12 critics' reviews, indicating "universal acclaim". Editors at Stereogum chose this release for Album of the Week, with critic Margaret Ferrell writing that the music feels "electrifyingly urgent", she also praises the lyrics that have "a spiraling reconciliation with the harmful search for perfection". Pitchfork awarded it their "Best New Music" distinction, with Ryan Dombal commenting that Yeule "shifts from future-shocked electronic pop to a super-sized emotional bloodletting steeped in '90s alternative" and calling the album "a blast, its turbo-charged riffs and sticky melodies all but begging you to crank the volume up". Writing for Beats Per Minute, John Amen commented, "There's a confluence of pop, futurism, and poetic self-deprecation here that could almost rewrite contemporary XM". He concluded by saying, "Behind that contorted psychodrama is a voyager who's attuned to the ways of humankind – eminently capable of engaging on their own terms".

== Track listing ==
All music is composed by Nat Ćmiel, except where noted.

Softscars track listing
No.	Title	Music	Producer(s)	Length
1.	"X W X"	Nat Ćmiel; Kin Leonn	Ćmiel; Leonn	2:25
2.	"Sulky Baby"	Ćmiel; Leonn	Ćmiel; Leonn	4:38
3.	"Softscars"	Ćmiel; Leonn	Ćmiel; Leonn; Mura Masa	3:26
4.	"4ui12"	Ćmiel; Leonn	Ćmiel; Leonn	2:43
5.	"Ghosts"		Ćmiel; Leonn	3:40
6.	"Dazies"	Ćmiel; Leonn	Ćmiel; Leonn	4:24
7.	"Fish in the Pool" (Shunji Iwai cover)	Shunji Iwai	Ćmiel	2:31
8.	"Software Update"		Ćmiel; Mura Masa	3:36
9.	"Inferno"		Ćmiel	3:14
10.	"Bloodbunny"	Ćmiel; Kavari; Leonn	Ćmiel; Leonn	2:42
11.	"Cyber Meat"		Chris Greatti	3:06
12.	"Aphex Twin Flame"	Ćmiel; Leonn	Ćmiel; Mura Masa	3:38
Total length:				40:03

- All tracks are stylized in all lowercase.

== Personnel ==
- Heba Kadry – mastering
- Nathan Boddy – mixing (tracks 1, 2, 5, 7)
- Geoff Swan – mixing (3, 4, 6)
- Nat Ćmiel – mixing (5, 7–9)
- Kin Leonn – mixing (5)
- Mitch McCarthy – mixing (11, 12)

== Charts ==
Chart performance for Softscars
Chart (2023)	Peak position
UK Album Downloads (OCC)	57
