= About Work the Dancefloor =

2019 single by Georgia

Single by Georgia

from the album Seeking Thrills
- Released: 28 March 2019
- Genre: Synth-pop; electropop
- Length: 3:14 (radio edit); 3:28 (album version)
- Label: Domino
- Songwriters: Georgia Barnes; Mark Ralph
- Producers: Georgia; Sean Oakley; Mark Ralph

Georgia singles chronology
"Started Out" (2018)	"About Work the Dancefloor" (2019)	"Never Let You Go" (2019)

Music video
- "About Work the Dancefloor" on YouTube

"About Work the Dancefloor" is a song by English musician Georgia. Co-written by Georgia and Mark Ralph, both of whom also produced the song alongside Sean Oakley, it was released by Domino Recording Company on 28 March 2019.

== Background and composition ==
Georgia stated that "About Work the Dancefloor" was written "in response to the clubbing culture [she] experienced in cities whilst touring". The song has been described as featuring "the tight electronic sequences of new wave", with its lyrics "as vulnerable as a handwritten note". It also contains "driving, arpeggiated synth bassline" and "washed out, kaleidoscopic analogue synths".

== Release and promotion ==
In June 2019, remixes of the song by American DJ The Blessed Madonna were released.

== Critical reception ==
Writing for Pitchfork, Michelle Kim called the hook "provocative" and praised Georgia's "disarmingly tender vocals". James Rettig of Stereogum deemed the song an "absolute powerhouse of a track".

== Accolades ==
"About Work the Dancefloor" won the 2019 Popjustice £20 Music Prize. The song also topped PopMatters' Best Dance Tracks of 2019 list. In 2020, it received NME Award nominations for Best British Single and Best Song in the World.

== Charts ==
Chart (2019)	Peak position
Belgium (Ultratip Bubbling Under Flanders)	44
Mexico (Mexico Airplay)	5

== Release history ==
Region	Date	Format	Label	Ref.
Various	28 March 2019	Digital download; streaming	Domino	
