= Lovesick (Mura Masa song) =

"Love$ick"

Single by Mura Masa featuring ASAP Rocky

from the album Mura Masa
- Released: 30 September 2016
- Recorded: 2014–16
- Genre: Electronic; hip hop; calypso
- Length: 3:12
- Label: Universal Music; Polydor; Anchor Point
- Songwriters: Alex Crossan; Rakim Mayers
- Producer: Mura Masa

Mura Masa singles chronology
"What If I Go?" (2016)	"Love$ick" (2016)	"1 Night" (2017)

ASAP Rocky singles chronology
"Good for You" (2015)	"Love$ick" (2016)	"Blended Family (What You Do for Love)" (2016)

Music video
- "Love$ick" on YouTube

"Lovesick" (stylised as "Love$ick") is a single by Guernsey-born music producer Mura Masa, featuring vocals from American rapper ASAP Rocky. It was released on 30 September 2016, by Universal Music, Polydor and Anchor Point Records, as the second single for his self-titled debut album.

== Recording and background ==
Mura Masa said about the recording of "Love$ick": "The first thing he [ASAP Rocky] said was that it made him feel really tropical, like he was in Ibiza or something and I was like, 'OK let's roll with that'. But then I said to him that it was about being stupid and feeling lovesick and hanging over a girl and he brought that to it as well. It was super fun, it was wild, we hung out, smoked cigarettes, talked about fashion and Tame Impala."

== Composition ==
"Love$ick" is a vocal version of a previous instrumental track titled "Lovesick", which was released in his debut EP Someday Somewhere. Mura Masa said that "the track originally was about sex and how I was feeling after a particularly empty encounter with a friend told through a kind of twisted-pop, calypso, hip hop dance track".

Rachel Aroesti of The Guardian called the original instrumental "jazzy" and "tropical". Jon Pareles wrote for The New York Times that the song is "built on a Caribbean-tinged beat and a four-bar loop of a piano that soon switches its sound to steel drums". Collin Robinson of Stereogum opined that "Rocky injects the bouncy percussion and steel-drummed Caribbean vibes with some steez". Rap-Up described the song as "soulful and electronic, calypso-tinged, rap-infused". Eve Barlow of Pitchfork called it "airhorn-assisted calypso".

== Critical reception ==
El Hunt of DIY said: "No revolutionary new angles come from this guest spot, but it's a statement of intent all the same".

== Remixes and samples ==
The song has been remixed by Four Tet and Mumdance.

== Track listing ==
Digital download
No.	Title	Length
1.	"Love$ick" (featuring A$AP Rocky)	3:10

Digital download
No.	Title	Length
1.	"Love$ick" (Four Tet Remix)	3:55

Digital download
No.	Title	Length
1.	"Love$ick" (featuring A$AP Rocky & Riko Dan) (Mumdance Remix)	3:21

== Charts ==
=== Weekly charts ===
Chart (2016–17)	Peak position
Australia (ARIA)	14
Belgium (Ultratop 50 Flanders)	46
Denmark (Tracklisten)	20
Finland Airplay (Radiosoittolista)	73
New Zealand (Recorded Music NZ)	13
Romania (Radiomonitor)	14
Switzerland (Schweizer Hitparade)	65
UK Singles (Official Charts)	59
US Rhythmic Airplay (Billboard)	40
US Hot Dance/Electronic Songs (Billboard)	18

=== Year-end charts ===
Chart (2016)	Position
US Hot Dance/Electronic Songs (Billboard)	98
Chart (2017)	Position
Australia (ARIA)	74
US Hot Dance/Electronic Songs (Billboard)	73

== Certifications ==
Region	Certification	Certified units/sales
Australia (ARIA)	2× Platinum	140,000^{‡}
Canada (Music Canada)	Platinum	80,000^{‡}
Denmark (IFPI Danmark)	Platinum	90,000^{‡}
Germany (BVMI)	Gold	200,000^{‡}
New Zealand (RMNZ)	5× Platinum	150,000^{‡}
Poland (ZPAV)	Gold	25,000^{‡}
United Kingdom (BPI)	Platinum	600,000^{‡}
United States (RIAA)	Gold	500,000^{‡}
^{‡} Sales+streaming figures based on certification alone.

== Release history ==
Region	Date	Format	Original	Label	Ref.
Worldwide	30 September 2016	Digital download	Original	Universal Music; Polydor; Anchor Point	
Worldwide	28 October 2016	Digital download	Four Fet Remix	Universal Music; Polydor; Anchor Point	
Worldwide	9 December 2016	Digital download	Mumdance Remix	Universal Music; Polydor; Anchor Point	
United States	17 January 2017	Rhythmic contemporary	Original	Polydor	
