= Nothing Great About Britain =

Studio album by Slowthai
- Released: 17 May 2019
- Genre: British hip hop; political hip hop; grime
- Length: 32:33 (standard); 51:46 (deluxe)
- Label: Method Records
- Producer: Kwes Darko; Mura Masa; Anish Bhatt; JD. Reid; Slaves; Earbuds

Slowthai chronology
| Nothing Great About Britain (2019) | Tyron (2021) |

Singles from Nothing Great About Britain
- 1. "Doorman" Released: 19 November 2018; 2. "Peace of Mind" Released: 19 February 2019; 3. "Gorgeous" Released: 28 March 2019; 4. "Nothing Great About Britain" Released: 3 May 2019

Nothing Great About Britain is the debut studio album by British rapper Slowthai. It was released on 17 May 2019 via Method Records. The album features guest appearances from British rappers Jaykae and Skepta, as well as production credits from Kwes Darko, Mura Masa and punk rock band Slaves.

Nothing Great About Britain was released to widespread critical acclaim. At Metacritic, which assigns a normalised rating out of 100 based on reviews from mainstream critics, the album has received a score of 82, based on 15 reviews.

== Background and release ==
The album title was announced on 22 February 2019 following the premiere of single "Peace of Mind". The album's artwork, tracklisting and release date were then announced by slowthai amidst his UK tour on 28 March 2019.

The album's lead single "Doorman", a collaboration with electronic music producer Mura Masa, was released on 19 November 2018; shortly after its premiere as BBC Radio 1 DJ Annie Mac's Hottest Record. The second single, "Peace of Mind", was released on 19 February 2019; shortly after its premiere as BBC Radio 1 DJ Phil Taggart's Hottest Record. Third single, "Gorgeous", was released on 28 March 2019; shortly after its premiere on Julie Adenuga's Beats 1 show. The title track was released as the album's fourth single on 3 May 2019. A music video for "Inglorious", featuring Skepta, was released on 16 May 2019.

== Artwork ==
The album’s artwork was released to the public amidst his UK tour on 28 March 2019. The cover features the now demolished Berkeley House in Northampton.

== Reception ==
=== Critical reception ===
Professional ratings
Aggregate scores
| Source | Rating |
|---|---|
| AnyDecentMusic? | 7.7/10 |
| Metacritic | 82/100 |
Review scores
| Source | Rating |
| AllMusic | 4/5 stars |
| Financial Times | 3/5 stars |
| The Guardian | 5/5 stars |
| Mojo | 4/5 stars |
| NME | 4/5 stars |
| The Observer | 4/5 stars |
| Pitchfork | 8.4/10 |
| Q | 4/5 stars |
| The Times | 4/5 stars |
| Uncut | 7/10 |

Nothing Great About Britain was met with critical acclaim by music critics upon its initial release. At Metacritic, which assigns a normalized rating out of 100 to reviews from mainstream critics, the album has an average score of 82, based on 15 reviews, indicating "universal acclaim".

Amongst those praising the album was AllMusic's Paul Simpson, who judged that "His debut album far surpasses the promise of those early tracks, tackling similar topics but with a much sharper focus." In a review for Clash, Yasmin Cowan wrote, "slowthai systematically and seamlessly tears down toxic politics, misguided notions of nationalism and social injustices with sardonic wit, seething vocals and woundingly skittish beats." Jake Hawkes also rated the album positively in a review for Dork, claiming that "[the album] is a triumph of a debut, genre-straddling, quick-witted and, most importantly, very fun to listen to. In it, Slowthai sticks two fingers up at the Britain of blue passports, the royals and the Tory party, while simultaneously raising up the alternative Britain, one of family and working-class pride."

Dan-O of Freemusicempire was clear that the promise of Slowthai's future is the real takeaway. "Nothing Great About Britain is a debut so he hasn't been steered into any lanes yet. You can feel the specificity in his perspective pairing with the ease of his skill and joyful thump of the sonic universe. Don't worry what number this is on the best of the year list. Numbers don't matter here: slowthai is here and fun to listen to."

Alexis Petridis gave the album a full five-star rating in a review for The Guardian, calling it "Clever, bleak, funny, bracing, aware of a broad musical heritage but never in thrall to it: after you hear Nothing Great About Britain, it’s even more obvious why Slowthai stands out." Tom Critten gave similar praise in a review for Loud and Quiet; "Brutally honest and amusingly witty with his flow, aggressive and dynamic with his production work, and captivatingly appealing with his charm and charisma, all taken together it assembles a hugely impressive, compelling and socially important listen. And whilst it’s a damning verdict on the current climate, all hope is not surrendered – after all, a full scale disavow of Britain does not feel like it’s reached in his prose." Jazz Monroe also gave a positive review for Pitchfork, stating that "Nothing Great About Britain avoids cross-generational pandering and bypasses territorial arguments over the borders of grime and UK rap. What binds the album is slowthai’s soul: his meticulously drawn characters, his affinity for left-behind outsiders"

While the album was well-regarded by most reviewers, some were more critical of it. Ben Devlin questioned the praise it received in a review for musicOMH, asking "what is there apart from these homages and imitations? Not much. The production shines at times, for example the punky thrash of Mura Masa-produced 'Doorman', but it’s undermined with clangers like 'you make me melt, sun, ice cream', and the sub-bass tones of 'Crack' deserve better accompaniment than another 'she’s a drug to me' cliché."

=== Year-end rankings ===
Year-end lists
| Publication | Accolade | Rank | Ref. |
|---|---|---|---|
| Afisha Daily (Russia) | The Best Foreign Albums of 2019 | 12 | |
| NME | The 50 Best Albums of 2019 | 4 | |

== Track listing ==
Credits adapted from Tidal.

| No. | Title | Writer(s) | Producer(s) | Length |
|---|---|---|---|---|
| 1. | "Nothing Great About Britain" | Tyron Frampton; Kwes Darko | Darko | 3:09 |
| 2. | "Doorman" (with Mura Masa) | Frampton; Alexander Crossan | Mura Masa | 3:04 |
| 3. | "Dead Leaves" | Frampton; Darko | Darko | 2:48 |
| 4. | "Gorgeous" | Frampton; Darko | Darko | 4:15 |
| 5. | "Crack" | Frampton; Poppy Ajudah; Anish Bhatt | Bhatt; Slowthai^{[a]} | 2:16 |
| 6. | "Grow Up" (featuring Jaykae) | Frampton; Jordan Day Reid; Janum Khan | JD. Reid | 3:00 |
| 7. | "Inglorious" (featuring Skepta) | Frampton; Reid; Joseph Junior Adenuga | JD. Reid | 3:08 |
| 8. | "Toaster" | Frampton; Darko | Darko | 3:04 |
| 9. | "Peace of Mind" | Frampton; Darko | Darko | 2:27 |
| 10. | "Missing" | Frampton; Darko; Laurence Vincent; Isaac Holman | Darko; Slaves^{[a]} | 2:20 |
| 11. | "Northampton's Child" | Frampton; Darko | Darko | 3:02 |
| Total length: | | | | 32:33 |

Digital deluxe bonus tracks
| No. | Title | Writer(s) | Producer(s) | Length |
|---|---|---|---|---|
| 12. | "Drug Dealer" | Frampton; Darko; Reid | JD. Reid | 3:08 |
| 13. | "North Nights" | Frampton; Darko | Darko | 3:32 |
| 14. | "Rainbow" | Frampton; Darko; Reid | Darko; JD. Reid | 2:44 |
| 15. | "Ladies" | Frampton; Darko | Darko | 3:19 |
| 16. | "Polaroid" | Frampton | Darko | 3:36 |
| 17. | "T N Biscuits" | Frampton; Bhatt; Samuel Castillano | Earbuds | 2:46 |
| Total length: | | | | 51:35 |

Notes

- ^{^[a]} signifies a co-producer.

== Personnel ==
Technical

- Mixed by Michalis "MsM" Michael, except "Doorman" mixed by Kwes Darko
- Mastered by Henkka Niemistö

Design

- Art direction – James Hamilton
- Artwork production and project manager – Andy Picton
- Artwork production assistants – Sonni Wibaut and Tom Griffiths
- Artwork stylist – Daniel Pacitti
- Creative director – Lewis Levi
- Graphic design – George Smith
- Photography – Crowns & Owls; assisted by Giles Smith and Will Reid

== Charts ==
| Chart (2019) | Peak position |
|---|---|
| Irish Albums (IRMA) | 64 |
| Scottish Albums (OCC) | 18 |
| UK Albums (OCC) | 9 |
| UK R&B Albums (OCC) | 1 |

== Certifications ==
| Region | Certification | Certified units/sales |
|---|---|---|
| United Kingdom (BPI) | Silver | 60,000^{‡} |
^{‡} Sales+streaming figures based on certification alone.

== See also ==
- List of UK R&B Albums Chart number ones of 2019
