= Jadu Heart =

British music duo

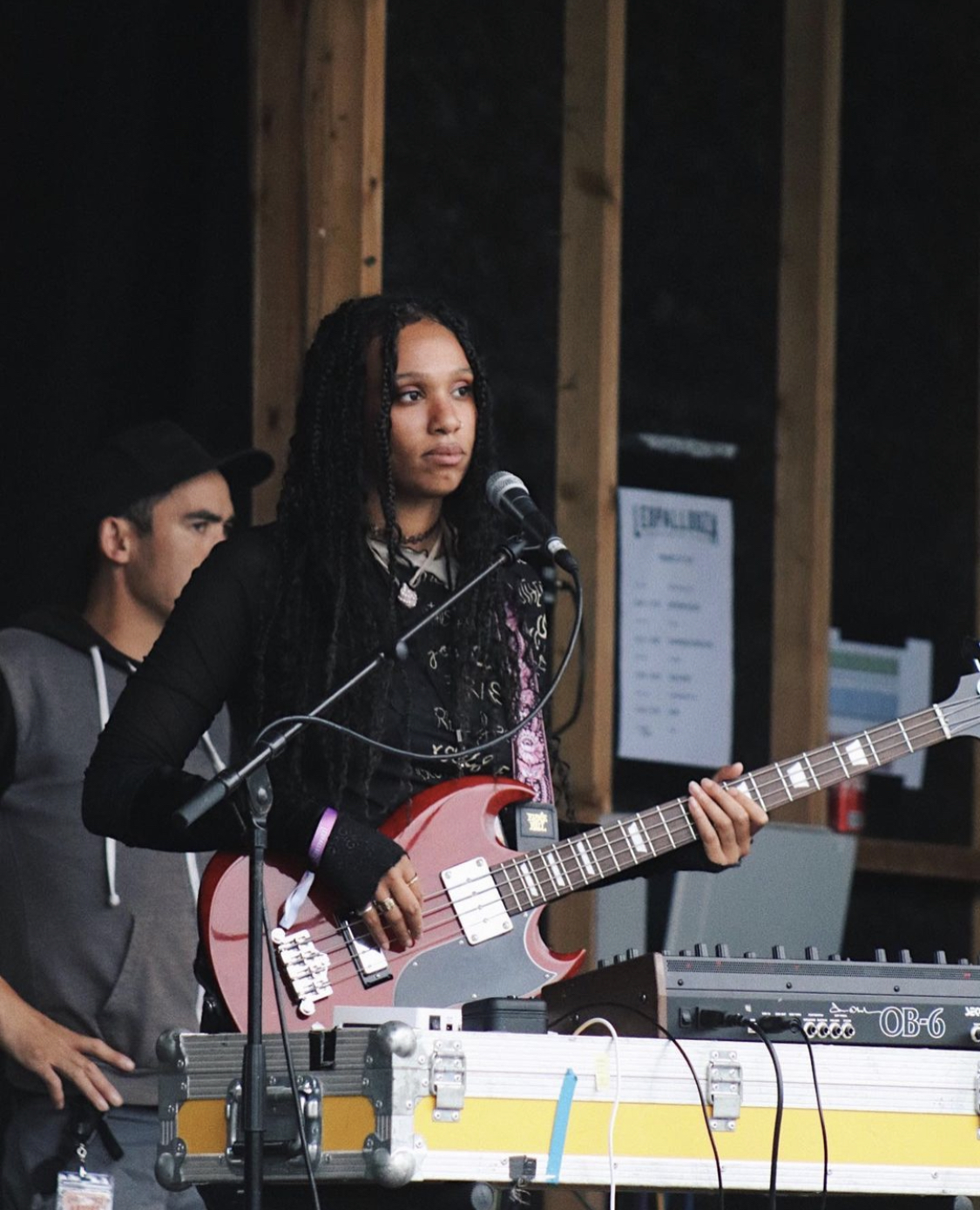
- Diva Jeffrey in 2019

Background information
- Origin: London, England
- Genres: Dream pop; shoegaze; indie rock; folktronica
- Years active: 2016–present
- Labels: VLF Records; Anchor Point Records
- Members: Diva-Sachy Jeffrey; Alex Headford
- Website: jaduheart.com

Jadu Heart are an English musical duo composed of Diva Jeffrey and Alex Headford. They have gained recognition for their independent approach to music production and their exploration of multiple genres in their compositions, with notable focuses on dream pop, shoegaze and indie rock.

== History ==
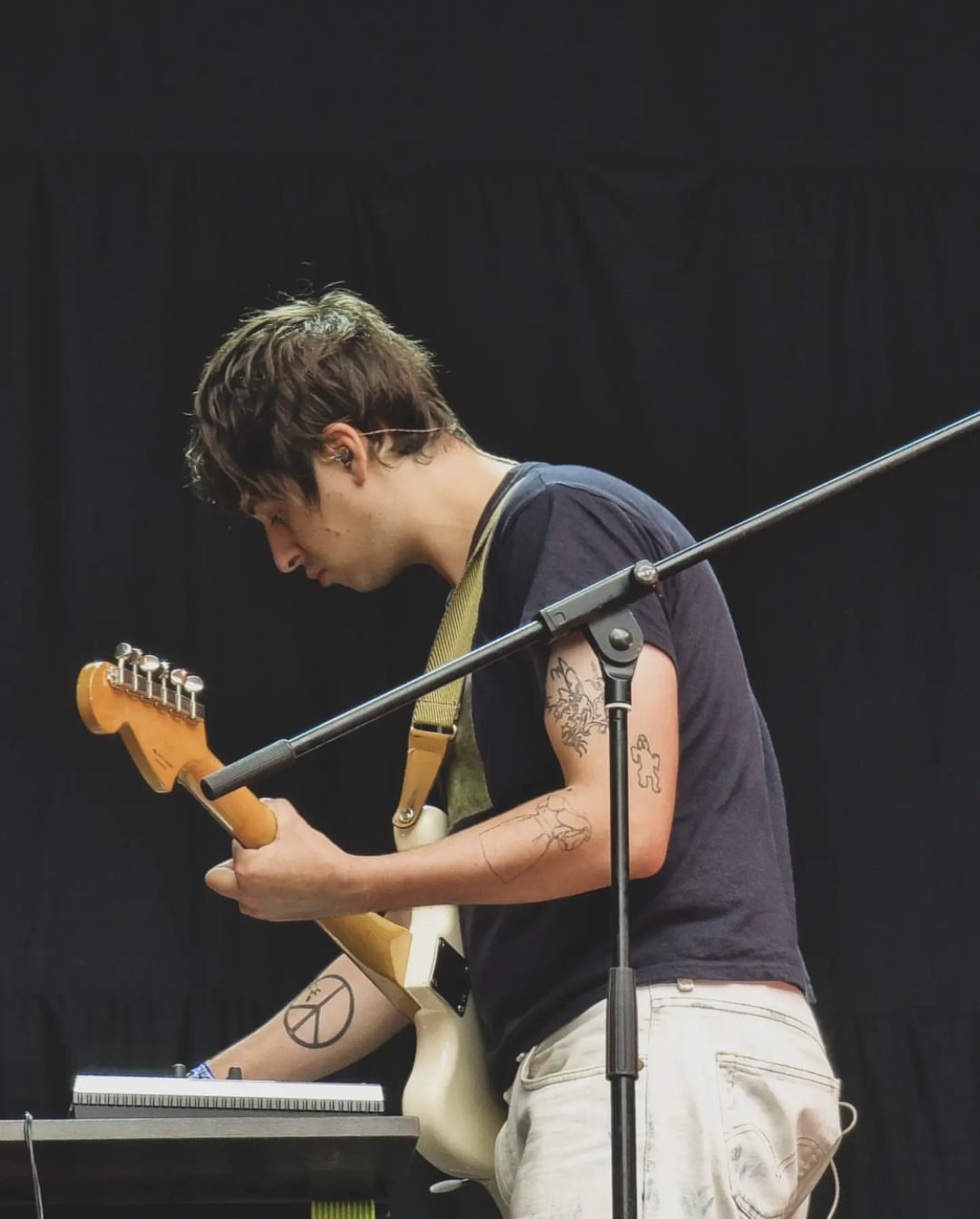
Alex Headford in Romania, 2022

The group formed as a result of a project assigned to Jeffery and Headford while studying at The British and Irish Modern Music Institute. The project, which tasked the class to depict a 'cycle' audibly, led Jadu Heart to create their first EP, Wanderflower. According to Jeffery, “Every song in our first EP corresponds to a different chapter in [Dina and Faro's] story.”

== Wanderflower, Ezras Garden, and Melt Away (2016–2019) ==
The duo were known for their conceptual storytelling through their characters (Jeffrey as Dina and Headford as Faro) and their "theatrical" masks seen donned during the live performances and press runs of their first two records.

In 2016, they released two EPs; Wanderflower and Ezras Garden. These EPs were later combined and released as an A + B-side compilation vinyl. The vinyl edition also included a poster that depicted an alternate universe the band had created.

In 2019, they released their debut album, Melt Away.

== Hyper Romance, Derealised (2019–2023) ==
In 2019, the duo relocated to Bristol and built a studio in a basement adjacent to a church. Their subsequent album, Hyper Romance drew inspiration from local gothic architecture, a passion for folk horror films, and the band's growing interest in Pagan rituals. This imagery permeates the album's music videos and sleeve design, reflecting the band's artistic direction. It is also evident in the band's stylistic shift towards a guitar-driven sound, influenced by grunge, shoegaze, and psychedelic folk music.

Coinciding with the release of Hyper Romance, the duo abandoned their masks and alter egos. This shift in style was accompanied by the album's opening track "Another Life", which alludes to this transformation. Notably, the track was released a week after the band posted the first picture of their unmasked faces online.

They released their third album Derealised in 2023, followed by their fourth album POST HEAVEN in 2025.

== Discography ==
=== Albums ===
- Melt Away (2019)
- Hyper Romance (2020)
- Derealised (2023)
- POST HEAVEN (2025)

=== EPs ===
- Wanderflower (2016)
- Ezra's Garden (2016)
