= Matt de Jong =

Graphic designer

Matt de Jong is a graphic designer and art director who specializes in album art and other promotional materials for musicians. He has designed album covers for artists including Cat Power, Clean Bandit, Deerhunter, Future Islands, Little Dragon, The Maccabees, Paolo Nutini, Lee Ranaldo, Ratking, and Vampire Weekend. de Jong is known for working with musicians who have a reputation for being "difficult". Lionel Skerratt, who co-founded Public Information Records, and Orlando Weeks, lead singer of The Maccabees, are childhood friends of de Jong's.

Complex magazine named de Jong's cover of the Little Dragon album Nabuma Rubberband #19, and his cover of the Ratking album So It Goes #23, on its list of the 30 Best Album Covers of 2014. His cover of the Future Islands album Singles was #3 in the Best Art Vinyl 2014 awards.

He was nominated for a 2018 Grammy Award for his work on Mura Masa's self-titled debut album.

Matt de Jong is the creative director and founder of the Go De Jong London studio, focused on art directing, branding, typography and digital works.
