= 18+ (band) =

American band

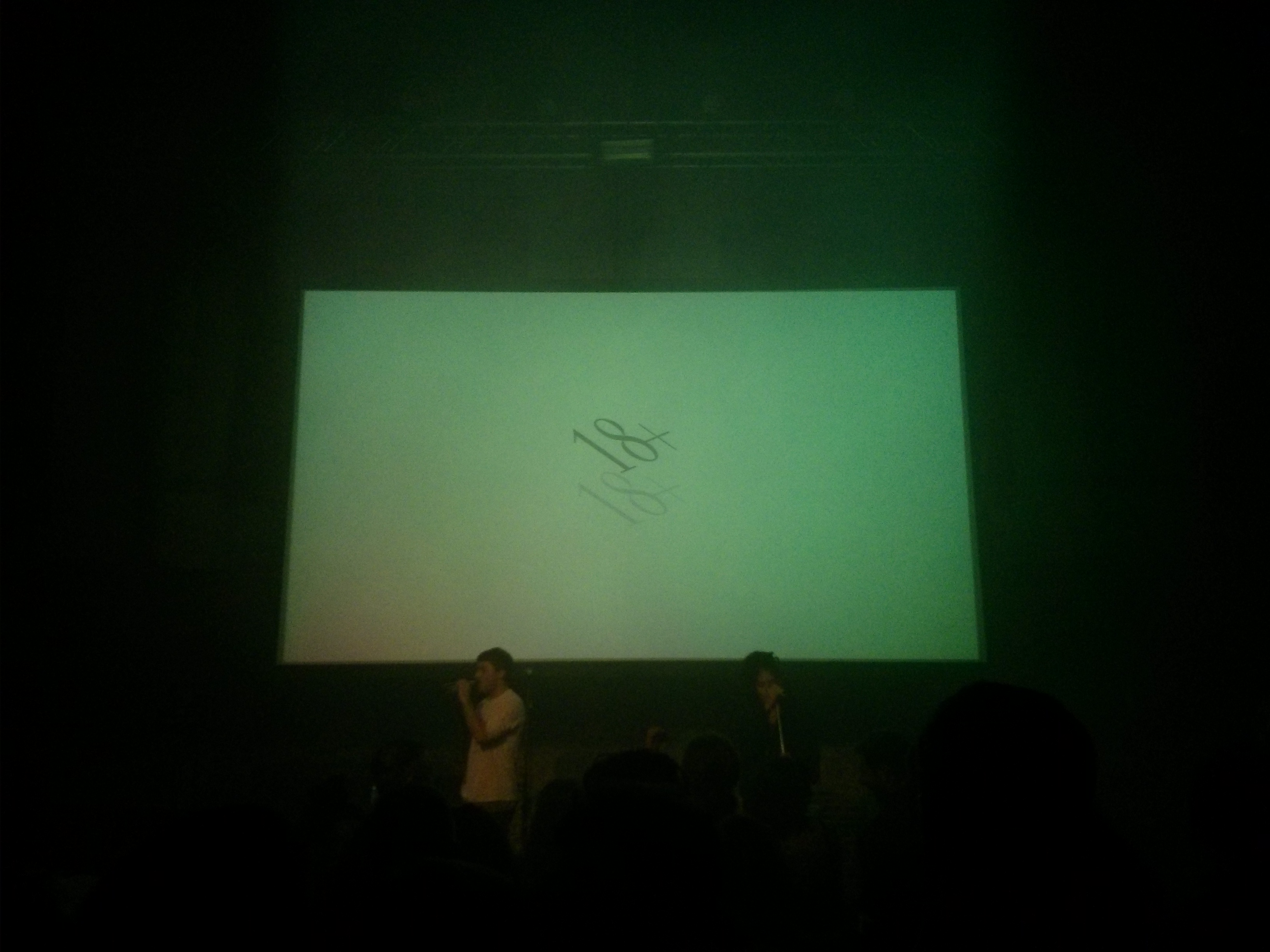

Background information
- Origin: Los Angeles
- Genres: Alternative R&B
- Years active: 2011–present
- Labels: Houndstooth
- Members: Justin Swinburne; Samia Mirza
- Website: eighteenpl.us

18+ is an American band consisting of musicians and visual artists Justin Swinburne and Samia Mirza.

== History and career ==
Having met at the School of the Art Institute of Chicago, Swinburne and Mirza launched the 18+ project in 2011 under anonymous pseudonyms. Their first recordings, a trilogy of mixtapes entitled M1xtape, Mixta2e, and Mixtap3, were launched online under the anonymous titles of 'Boy' and 'Sis'.

Much of the band's lyrical content concerns sex. Mirza commented on this: "I don't ever think the way we represent sex is explicitly sexy; we're not trying to seduce. We're playing up to roles we still see in music today."

In August 2014, 18+ released their first single, "Crow"/"Horn", on London nightclub Fabric's record label Houndstooth. This was followed by their debut album, Trust, which was released on Houndstooth in November 2014. Killian Fox, writing in The Observer, said of the album "Trust moves at a stoned pace, oozing sex and a glitchy sense of unease, though it’s never clear whether it’s critiquing its excesses or revelling in them."

The band's follow-up single, "Dry", was released on Houndstooth on 23 February 2015.

In January and February 2015, 18+ toured Trust in the US and Europe, including dates in Los Angeles, London, Amsterdam, Berlin and Paris.

== Discography ==
=== Studio albums ===
- Trust (2014), Houndstooth
- Collect (2016), Houndstooth

=== Mixtapes ===
- M1xtape (2011) - download only
- Mixta2e (2012) - download only
- Mixtap3 (2013) - download only
- Fore (2016) - download only

=== Singles ===
- "Crow"/"Horn" (2014), Houndstooth
- "Dry" (2015), Houndstooth
