= Georgia (musician) =

English singer and musician

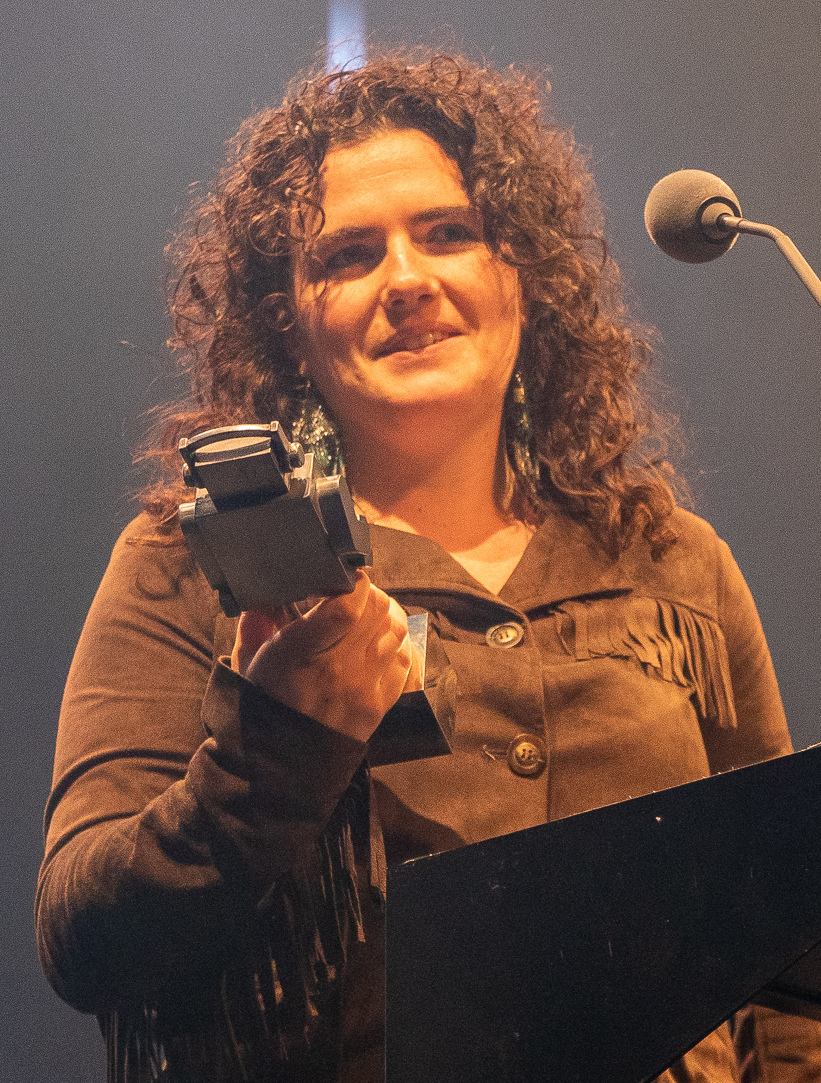
- Barnes at the 2019 AIM Awards

Background information
- Born: Georgia Barnes; London, England
- Genres: Synth-pop; electropop; pop rap
- Occupations: Record producer; songwriter; singer; drummer; rapper
- Instruments: Vocals; drums; percussion; keyboards; synthesizer
- Years active: 2015–present
- Labels: Domino; Kaya Kaya
- Website: georgiauk.com

Georgia Barnes, known mononymously as Georgia, is an English record producer, songwriter, singer, rapper and drummer. The daughter of Leftfield cofounder Neil Barnes, Georgia began her music career as a drummer for artists such as Kwes and Kae Tempest.

She began her career as a singer and record producer with the release of her debut studio album Georgia (2015). Her second studio album Seeking Thrills was released in 2020, and was shortlisted for the Mercury Prize. Her third studio album Euphoric was released in 2023.

== Early life ==
Georgia Barnes was born in London; her father is Neil Barnes, the cofounder and keyboardist of English electronic music group Leftfield. As a child, Georgia was a footballer who had played in youth squads associated with Queens Park Rangers W.F.C. and Arsenal W.F.C. She left football after the death of her coach, when she described things as getting "too intense".

Barnes attended the BRIT School in the London Borough of Croydon, where she began playing the drums professionally.

== Career ==
Georgia is signed to the label Domino. In 2019, before the release of her second studio album Seeking Thrills, she performed at the Glastonbury Festival and won the Association of Independent Music's One to Watch award in association with BBC Music Introducing.

== Musical style ==
Vice have described Georgia's sound as "euphoric, late-night dance", while her 2015 self-titled album was compared to Missy Elliott and MIA. Talking about her 2019 single "About Work the Dancefloor" with Sean Tayler from Futuremag Music, Georgia shared "I made this song after a weekend in Berlin entirely dancing in a few clubs and I realised how important the dancefloor is to people to give them a certain relief from their everyday activities".

== Personal life ==
In a 2019 interview with Billboard, Barnes discussed her decision to quit alcohol and become vegan.

== Discography ==
=== Studio albums ===
Title	Details	Peak chart positions			
Title	Details	UK	UK Indie	UK Down	BEL (FL)
Georgia	Released: 7 August 2015; Label: Domino; Format: CD, digital download, streaming	—	—	—	—
Seeking Thrills	Released: 10 January 2020; Label: Domino; Format: Vinyl, CD, digital download, streaming	24	1	5	139
Euphoric	Released: 28 July 2023; Label: Domino; Format: Vinyl, CD, digital download, streaming	86	—	—	—

=== Extended plays ===
Title	Details	Peak chart positions
Title	Details	UK Physical Singles
Come In	Released: 21 July 2014; Label: Kaya Kaya; Format: Vinyl, CD, digital download, streaming	60
Seeking Thrills (After Hours)	Released: 12 June 2021; Format: Vinyl, digital download; Label: Domino	23

=== Singles ===
Title	Year	Peak chart positions						Album
Title	Year	UK Sales	UK Indie Br.	BEL (FL) Tip	BEL (WA) Tip	MEX Airplay	US Dance	Album
"Move Systems"	2015	—	—	—	—	—	—	Georgia
"Nothing Solutions"	2015	—	—	—	—	—	—	Georgia
"Feel It" (solo or featuring Baby Tate)	2017	—	—	—	—	—	—	Seeking Thrills
"Mellow" (featuring Shygirl)	2018	—	—	—	—	—	—	Seeking Thrills
"Started Out"	2018	76	16	26	31	—	—	Seeking Thrills
"About Work the Dancefloor"	2019	85	—	44	— (Note: "About Work the Dancefloor" did not enter the bubbling under Ultratip chart, but was registered as an extra tip.)	5	—	Seeking Thrills
"Never Let You Go"	2019	100	—	36	— (Note: "Never Let You Go" did not enter the bubbling under Ultratip chart, but was registered as an extra tip.)	12	—	Seeking Thrills
"24 Hours"	2020	—	—	41	40	—	30	Seeking Thrills
"Get Me Higher" (with David Jackson)	2021	—	—	—	—	—	—	Non-album single
"It's Euphoric"	2023	—	—	—	—	—	—	Euphoric
"Give It Up for Love"	2023	—	—	—	—	—	—	Euphoric
"All Night"	2023	—	—	—	—	—	—	Euphoric
"Wanna Play"	2025	—	—	—	—	—	—	TBA
"—" denotes recording did not chart in that territory.

=== Guest appearances ===
Title	Year	Album
"Location Unknown" (Honne featuring Georgia)	2018	Love Me / Love Me Not
"Days Forever" (Suicideyear featuring Georgia)	2018	Color The Weather
"Summer Blues" (Ragz Originale featuring Georgia)	2018	Nature
"Xhosa" (Africa Express featuring Otim Alpha, Moonchild Sanelly, Damon Albarn, Georgia, Nick Zinner, BCUC, Blk Jks & Blue May)	2019	Africa Express Presents: Molo
"City In Lights" (Africa Express featuring Nick Zinner, Otim Alpha, Mahotella Queens & Georgia)	2019	Egoli
"Mama" (Africa Express featuring Radio 123, Georgia & Otim Alpha)	2019	Egoli
"Live Like We're Dancing" (Mura Masa featuring Georgia)	2020	R.Y.C
"Aries" (Gorillaz featuring Peter Hook & Georgia)	2020	Song Machine, Season One: Strange Timez

== Awards and nominations ==
Year	Organization	Award	Work	Result	Ref.
2019	Rober Awards Music Prize	Floorfiller of the Year	"About Work the Dancefloor"	Nominated	
2019	AIM Independent Music Awards	Independent Track of the Year	"About Work the Dancefloor"	Nominated	
2019	AIM Independent Music Awards	One to Watch	Herself	Won	
2019	MTV Europe Music Award	Best Push Act	Herself	Nominated	
2019	BBC	Sound of 2020	Herself	Longlisted	
2019	Popjustice £20 Music Prize	Best British Pop Single	"About Work the Dancefloor"	Won	
2020	NME Awards	Best British Song	"About Work the Dancefloor"	Nominated	
2020	NME Awards	Best Song in the World	"About Work the Dancefloor"	Nominated	
2020	Mercury Prize	Best Album	Seeking Thrills	Nominated	
2020	Best Art Vinyl	Best Vinyl Art	Seeking Thrills	Nominated	
2020	MTV EMA Awards	Best Push	Herself	Nominated	
2021	GAFFA Awards	Best International Solo Act	Herself	Nominated	
2021	GAFFA Awards	Best International Album	Seeking Thrills	Nominated	
2024	AIM Independent Music Awards	Best Independent Video	"I Might Be Fake" (with Master Peace)	Nominated	
