= Mura Masa =

British music producer and songwriter (born 1996)

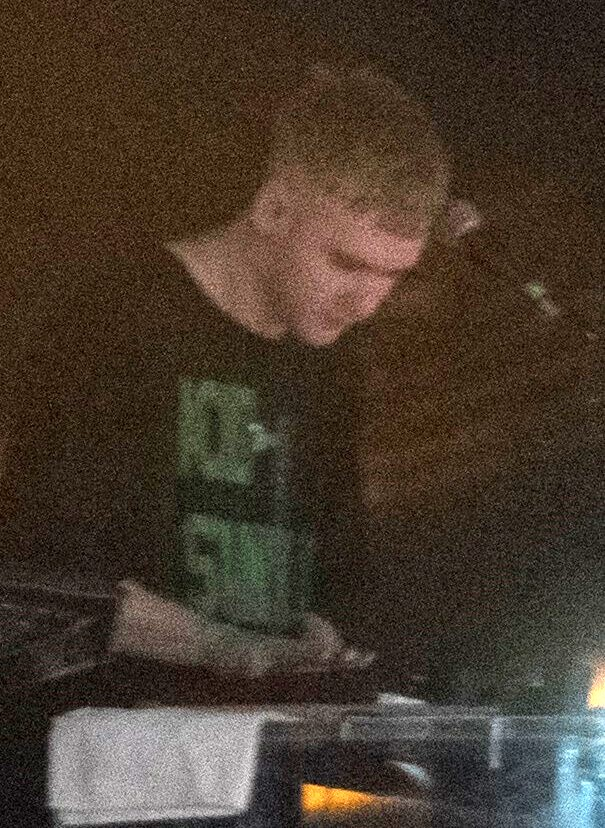
- Mura Masa performing at Field Day in 2017

Background information
- Born: Alexander George Edward Crossan; 5 April 1996 (age 30); Castel, Guernsey
- Genres: Pop; dance; hip hop
- Occupations: Record producer; songwriter; disc jockey; record executive
- Years active: 2013–present
- Labels: Anchor Point; Jakarta; Polydor; Downtown; Interscope
- Website: muramasa.me

Alexander George Edward Crossan (born 5 April 1996), better known by his stage name Mura Masa, is a Guernsey-born electronic record producer and songwriter. Crossan is best known for his 2016 song "Lovesick" (featuring ASAP Rocky), which peaked at number 59 on the UK singles chart. He produced British singer PinkPantheress' 2022 single "Boy's a Liar", which peaked at number two on the chart, while its remix "Boy's a Liar Pt. 2", with American rapper Ice Spice, peaked at number three on the US Billboard Hot 100.

Crossan's self-titled debut album (2017) was nominated for Best Dance/Electronic Album and Best Recording Package at the 60th Annual Grammy Awards. His remix of Haim's "Walking Away" won Best Remixed Recording, Non-Classical at the 61st Annual Grammy Awards.

== Early life ==
Crossan was born and raised in Guernsey. After playing guitar, bass, drums and singing in local deathcore and gospel bands, Crossan started self-producing at the age of 15, "searching for samples on YouTube and other corners of the internet". He entered the electronic music scene after learning about Hudson Mohawke and streamed music via YouTube, where he discovered James Blake, Cashmere Cat, and Sbtrkt. Crossan's influences, including Gorillaz and the Smiths, inspired him to write music and learn to play different instruments. At 16, Crossan started to make electronic songs using Ableton Live, and uploaded them to SoundCloud the following year under the alias Mura Masa, taken from Japanese swordsmith Muramasa Sengo. He adopted the alias as he grew up with Japanese anime and Nintendo games, which led to his interest in the myth of Muramasa. His early work incorporated elements of hip hop music, East Asian music (such as Shakuhachi flutes and thumb pianos), and glitchy electronica.

At 17, Crossan uploaded his first tracks, remixes and bootlegs to SoundCloud. The track "Lotus Eater" was picked up by BBC Radio 1 with Zane Lowe, Annie Mac, Huw Stephens, and Phil Taggart all playing the song on their shows. After leaving Guernsey to study English literature at University of Sussex in Brighton, Crossan began playing his music live, with sold-out shows at the Green Door Store in Brighton and Electrowerkz in London. Crossan started his career by posting a mixtape called Soundtrack to a Death to SoundCloud in 2014. The mixtape was subsequently distributed globally by German label Jakarta Records.

== Music career ==
=== 2015–2016: Someday Somewhere ===
Crossan signed to his own label Anchor Point Records in 2015, in partnership with Polydor Records and Interscope Records who distribute in the UK and in North America respectively. As well as Mura Masa records, the label has released music by Dublin artist Bonzai and post-music duo Jadu Heart.

In April 2015, he released his debut EP Someday Somewhere, with lead track "Firefly" being chosen for the In New Music We Trust playlist at BBC Radio 1. Released via Anchor Point, the EP featured UK vocalists Nao, Denai Moore, and Jay Prince. The track "Lovesick" from the EP reached number 1 on the Spotify Viral charts in the UK and US. On 27 April 2015, he broadcast a 60-minute mix on the BBC Radio 1 show Diplo and Friends. Crossan was long-listed for the BBC Sound of... 2016 in December 2015, and placed 5th overall in the shortlist in January 2016.

On 15 March 2016, he unveiled the second single "What If I Go?" from his upcoming album. On 30 September 2016, he released his collaborative single titled "Lovesick" featuring American rapper ASAP Rocky via Anchor Point and Downtown Records and Interscope Records. The song is a newer version of Masa's 2015 single "Lovesick Fuck". Crossan said he arranged a meeting to discuss the collaboration with Rocky when he happened to be in London for several days. An official music video for the song was published on 3 November 2016 by Mura Masa's YouTube channel.

=== 2017–2019: Mura Masa ===
Crossan co-wrote the track "First Things First" on Stormzy's Gang Signs & Prayer, which entered the UK Albums Chart at number 1 on 3 March 2017. The track also entered the singles chart at number 25. On 17 March 2017, he released "1 Night", a collaboration with Charli XCX. Speaking about the collaboration, he said "I think I just had that beat lying around for a while and we sent it to a couple of people. Then Charli just did her thing".

Crossan released his self-titled debut studio album, Mura Masa on 14 July 2017. It was released by Polydor, Interscope, Downtown, and Anchor Point Records. The album was produced and recorded from 2014 to 2016, and has guest features by A. K. Paul, ASAP Rocky, Bonzai, Charli XCX, Christine and the Queens, Damon Albarn, Desiigner, Jamie Lidell, Nao, and Tom Tripp. Upon release, it received positive reviews by critics, and debuted at number 19 on the UK Albums Chart and at 192 on the US Billboard 200. The album received nominations for Best Dance/Electronic Album and Best Recording Package at the 60th Annual Grammy Awards.

In June, Crossan worked with Nile Rodgers-organised collective Chic on the band's comeback album, It's About Time. He was featured alongside Cosha and Vic Mensa on the comeback single "Till the World Falls", which was released on 22 June 2018. Before that, on 12 June 2018, the band also premiered another song from the album "Boogie All Night", which features Crossan, alongside working affiliate Nao. Crossan's remix of Haim's "Walking Away" won Best Remixed Recording, Non-Classical at the 61st Annual Grammy Awards on 10 February 2019.

=== 2020–2022: R.Y.C. ===
Crossan released his sophomore album, R.Y.C. on 17 January 2020. It was released by Polydor and Anchor Point Records. The album features Clairo, Ned Green, Slowthai, Tirzah, Georgia, Ellie Rowsell. Upon release, it received generally favourable reviews by critics, and reached number 23 on the UK Albums Chart.

== Awards and Nominations ==
Awards	Year	Category	Work	Result	Ref.
Grammy Awards	2018	Best Dance/Electronic Album	Mura Masa	Nominated	
Grammy Awards	2018	Best Recording Package	Mura Masa	Nominated	
Grammy Awards	2019	Best Remixed Recording, Non-Classical	"Walking Away (Mura Masa Remix)"	Won	
Grammy Awards	2022	Best Remixed Recording, Non-Classical	"Talks (Mura Masa Remix)"	Nominated	
Ivor Novello Awards	2017	Best Contemporary Song	"Lovesick" (featuring ASAP Rocky)	Nominated	
Ivor Novello Awards	2022	Best Contemporary Song	"Just for Me" (as songwriter)	Nominated	
UK Music Video Awards	2016	Best Dance Video – Newcomer	"What If I Go?"	Nominated	
UK Music Video Awards	2017	Best Urban Video - UK	"Lovesick" (featuring ASAP Rocky)	Nominated	
UK Music Video Awards	2017	Best Live Session	"Blu (Live)" (featuring Damon Albarn)	Won	
UK Music Video Awards	2020	Best Alternative Video - UK	"Teenage Headache Dreams"	Nominated	
UK Music Video Awards	2020	Best Dance/Electronic Video - UK	"Deal Wiv It" (with Slowthai)	Nominated	
UK Music Video Awards	2023	Best Dance/Electronic Video - Newcomer	"Whenever I Want"	Won	
UK Music Video Awards	2024	Best Dance / Electronic Video – Newcomer	"Rise"	Nominated	
UK Music Video Awards	2024	Best Editing in a Video – Newcomer	"Rise"	Nominated	
UK Music Video Awards	2025	Best Dance / Electronic Video – UK	"Jump"	Nominated	
UK Music Video Awards	2026	Best Editing in a Video – Newcomer	"I'm Really Hot (For Myself)"	Pending	

== Discography ==
- Mura Masa (2017)
- R.Y.C. (2020)
- Demon Time (2022)
- Curve 1 (2024)
- Curve 2 (2027)
