= To Hell with It (Remixes) =

Remix album by PinkPantheress
- Released: 28 January 2022
- Recorded: 2021
- Length: 59:24
- Label: Elektra; Parlophone

PinkPantheress chronology
To Hell with It (2021)	To Hell with It (Remixes) (2022)	Take Me Home (2022)

To Hell with It (Remixes) is the debut remix album by British singer-songwriter and record producer PinkPantheress released on 28 January 2022 through Elektra and Parlophone Records. The album was partially developed by British producer Anz, who posted a teaser for the album a week before its release. The remix album which runs for about 59 minutes, features remixes of songs by LSDXOXO, FKJ, Surf Gang, Tommy Gold, Sango, O.J.C., and Nia Archives.

== Background and reception ==
Professional ratings
Review scores
Source	Rating
Rolling Stone	3.5/5 stars

Following the release of PinkPantheress' debut mixtape To Hell with It (2021), a remix version would be teased a week prior to its release on 28 January 2022, through Elektra and Parlophone Records. Remixes by LSDXOXO, FKJ, Surf Gang, Tommy Gold, Sango, O.J.C., Nia Archives, also appear on the mixtape. "Pain" by Powfu, a remix of "I Must Apologise" by Tommy Gold, a remix of "Last Valentines" by WondaGurl, a remix of "Reason" by Jarreau Vandal, a remix of "Just for Me" by el Guincho, a remix of "All My Friends Know" by Anz, a remix of "Passion" by Sam Gellaitry, and a drum and bass remix of "Noticed I Cried" by Flume. The album was released as a cassette tape and as a USB flash drive. Rolling Stone's Will Dukes gave the mixtape three and a half stars, calling it "an upbeat repurposing of all the favorites from [her] acclaimed 2021 mixtape."

== Track listing ==
To Hell with It (Remixes) track listing (disc one)
No.	Title	Writer(s)	Remixer	Length
1.	"Pain" (Powfu remix)	Isaiah Faber; Martin Green; Mike Powell; PinkPantheress	Powfu	2:01
2.	"Pain" (LSDXOXO remix)	Green; Powell; PinkPantheress	LSDXOXO	2:27
3.	"I Must Apologise" (Sango remix)	Crystal Waters; Neal Conway; Oscar Scheller; PinkPantheress	Sango	1:55
4.	"I Must Apologise" (Tommy Gold remix)	Crystal Waters; Neal Conway; Oscar Scheller; PinkPantheress	Tommy Gold	2:10
5.	"Last Valentines" (WondaGurl remix)	Brad Delson; Chester Bennington; David Farrell; Joseph Hahn; Mark Wakefield; Mike Shinoda; PinkPantheress; Robert Bourdon	WondaGurl	3:02
6.	"Last Valentines" (2AAB remix)	Delson; Bennington; Farrell; Hahn; Wakefield; Shinoda; PinkPantheress; Bourdon	2AAB	1:39
7.	"Passion" (Sam Gellaitry remix)	Izco; Jkarri; PinkPantheress	Sam Gellaitry	3:00
8.	"Just for Me" (El Guincho remix)	Alexander Crossan; PinkPantheress	El Guincho	1:53
9.	"Noticed I Cried" (Flume remix)	Franz Buchholtz; Scheller; PinkPantheress	Flume	2:55
10.	"Noticed I Cried" (O.J.C remix)	Buchholtz; Scheller; PinkPantheress	O.J.C	1:54
11.	"Reason" (Jarreau Vandal remix)	PinkPantheress; Zach Nahome	Jarreau Vandal	2:48
12.	"Reason" (Evilgiane remix)	PinkPantheress; Nahome	Surf Gang; Evil Giane	3:06
13.	"All My Friends Know" (FKJ remix)	PinkPantheress; Sven Tortenson	FKJ	4:02
14.	"All My Friends Know" (Anz remix)	PinkPantheress; Tortenson	Anz	5:11
15.	"Nineteen" (Nia Archives remix)	Dill Aitchison; PinkPantheress; Tomaz di Cunto	Nia Archives	2:37
Total length:				40:48

To Hell with It (Remixes) (disc two)
No.	Title	Writer(s)	Producer(s)	Length
1.	"Pain"	Martin Green; Mike Powell; PinkPantheress	PinkPantheress	1:38
2.	"I Must Apologise"	Crystal Waters; Neal Conway; Oscar Scheller; PinkPantheress	Scheller; PinkPantheress	1:48
3.	"Last Valentines"	Brad Delson; Chester Bennington; David Farrell; Joseph Hahn; Mark Wakefield; Mike Shinoda; PinkPantheress; Robert Bourdon	PinkPantheress	1:13
4.	"Passion"	Izco; Jkarri; PinkPantheress	Izco; Jkarri	2:18
5.	"Just for Me"	Alexander Crossan; PinkPantheress	Mura Masa	1:56
6.	"Noticed I Cried"	Franz Buchholtz; Scheller; PinkPantheress	Scheller; PinkPantheress	1:22
7.	"Reason"	PinkPantheress; Zach Nahome	PinkPantheress; Nahome	2:11
8.	"All My Friends Know"	PinkPantheress; Sven Tortenson	Dill Aitchison; Kairos Laferme	1:58
9.	"Nineteen"	Dill Aitchison; PinkPantheress; Tomaz di Cunto	Aitchison	2:33
10.	"Break It Off" (bonus track)	Adam F; PinkPantheress	Adam F; PinkPantheress	1:36
Total length:				18:36

== Personnel ==
Credits extracted from Tidal.

- PinkPantheress – vocals, production (1–6, 9–12), songwriting, programming
- Isaiah Faber – remixing, songwriting (1)
- Cass Irvine – mixing
- Dill Aitchison – songwriting, production
