= Boy's a Liar =

2023 song by PinkPantheress

Single by PinkPantheress

from the EP Take Me Home
- B-side: "Do You Miss Me?"
- Released: 30 November 2022
- Studio: Mura Masa's home studio
- Genre: Dance-pop; bubblegum pop; synth-pop; plugg
- Length: 2:11
- Label: Warner UK
- Songwriters: Victoria Walker; Alexander Crossan
- Producers: PinkPantheress; Mura Masa

PinkPantheress singles chronology
"Do You Miss Me?" (2022)	"Boy's a Liar" (2022)	"Take Me Home" (2023)

Audio video
- "Boy's a Liar" on YouTube

"Boy's a Liar" is a song by British singer-songwriter and record producer PinkPantheress. Released on 30 November 2022 through Warner Records as a single, it was later included on her extended play Take Me Home. Written and produced by her and Mura Masa, the song is a dance-pop, bubblegum pop, and synth-pop song with a Jersey club beat, elements of chiptune, lo-fi and hyperpop, and lyrics about feeling inadequate in a relationship. It gained traction on TikTok soon after its release and later peaked at number two in the UK, Ireland, and Australia. A remix of the song, retitled "Boy's a Liar Pt. 2", with American rapper Ice Spice, was released through Parlophone Records, Elektra Records, and 3EE on 3 February 2023 as the lead single from PinkPantheress' debut album Heaven Knows.

Both "Boy's a Liar" and its remix received positive reviews from critics. The remix was commercially successful, reaching number three on the US Billboard Hot 100, becoming the first top-10 on the chart for both PinkPantheress and Ice Spice and the first chart entry for PinkPantheress. It was certified platinum by the Recording Industry Association of America (RIAA). The song also reached number three on the Billboard Global 200, and globally, reached number one in New Zealand and number two in Canada. A music video for the remix, directed by George and Frederick Buford, shows PinkPantheress and Ice Spice together in various locations throughout New York City.

== Background and composition ==
Prior to the release of "Boy's a Liar", English singer PinkPantheress found success on TikTok and with the release of her debut mixtape, To Hell with It. Record producer Mura Masa, who had previously produced PinkPantheress's 2021 single "Just for Me", produced "Boy's a Liar" at the studio in Mura Masa's garden at home, where the two had been spending time together due to their living close to one another. The song was made in about two hours. After PinkPantheress released the Kaytranada-produced "Do You Miss Me?" in early November 2022, "Boy's a Liar" was released through Warner Records on 30 November 2022 and later included on her extended play Take Me Home, released in December 2022. It became popular on TikTok, where it soundtracked over 760,000 videos as of February 2023.

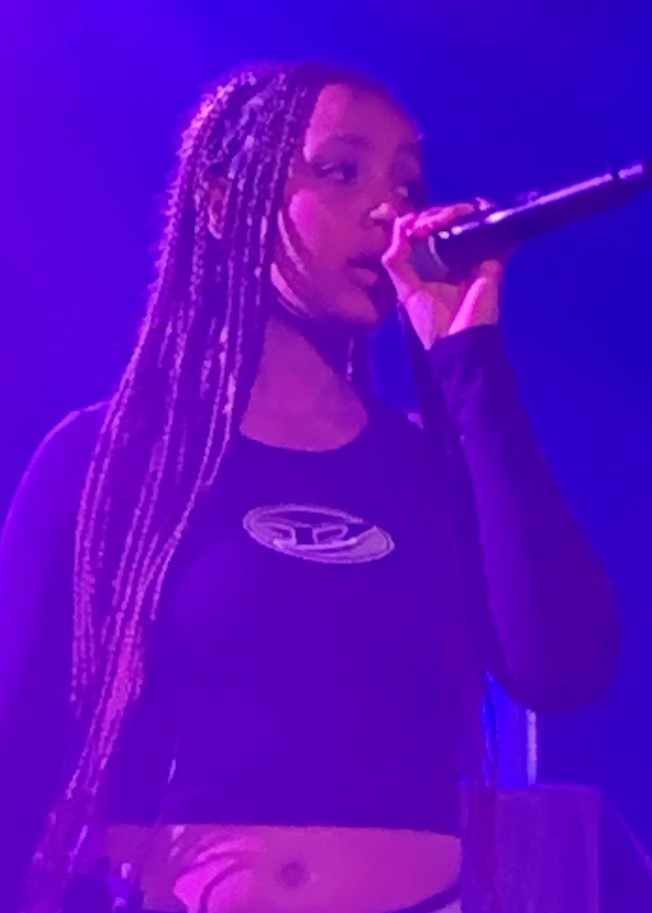
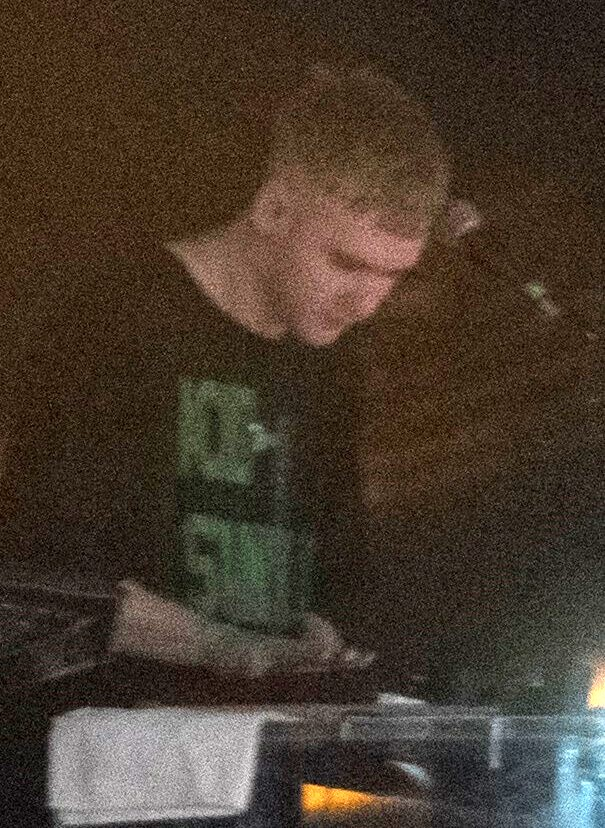
"Boy's a Liar" was written and produced by PinkPantheress (left) and Mura Masa (right)

"Boy's a Liar" runs for two minutes and 11 seconds. It is a dance-pop, bubblegum pop, and synth-pop song with elements of chiptune and hyperpop. It was written and produced by PinkPantheress and Mura Masa; on it, PinkPantheress sings with "plush and quiet" vocals about her insecurities with feeling unattractive to her partner due to the male gaze. PinkPantheress based it on a real relationship with a man who "ended up being a liar after the song came out" and who she threatened to put a hex on. She also likened the song's theme to "that feeling that someone's only interested in you when you look good", while Mura Masa described the song as an expression of both artists' "borderline-misandrist tendencies". Its lo-fi production features a Jersey club beat, kick drums, and 8-bit synths, and ends with a squeaking sound typically used in Jersey club songs. The drums were inspired by the increasing popularity of Jersey and Baltimore club music in popular music in 2023 with songs like Lil Uzi Vert's 2022 song "Just Wanna Rock".

== Reception and commercial performance ==
Shaad D'Souza of Pitchfork felt that "Boy's a Liar" was "one of PinkPantheress' strongest tracks" and the only song on her debut extended play (EP), Take Me Home (2022), that "holds its own against PinkPantheress' most indelible hits" as PinkPantheress was "step[ping] fully into the pop star role that she's been trying on over the past year". After spending 10 weeks on the UK Singles Chart, "Boy's a Liar" peaked at number two on the chart dated 24 February 2023. It also peaked at number two on the ARIA Charts. The work was nominated for PRS for Music Most Performed Work Ivor Novello Award on 23 May 2024.

== Charts ==
=== Weekly charts ===
Weekly charts performance for "Boy's a Liar"
Chart (2023)	Peak position
Australia (ARIA)	2
Australia Hip Hop/R&B (ARIA)	1
Ireland (IRMA)	2
Latvia Airplay (LAIPA)	18
Malaysia International (RIM)	7
MENA (IFPI)	7
New Zealand (Recorded Music NZ)	10
Singapore (RIAS)	5
Turkey (Radiomonitor Türkiye)	9
UK Singles (Official Charts)	2
US Bubbling Under Hot 100 (Billboard)	5

=== Monthly charts ===
Chart (2023)	Peak position
Paraguay (SPG)	47

=== Year-end charts ===
Chart (2023)	Position
Australia (ARIA)	5
UK Singles (OCC)	8

== Certifications ==
Certifications for "Boy's a Liar"
Region	Certification	Certified units/sales
Australia (ARIA)	3× Platinum	210,000^{‡}
Canada (Music Canada)	5× Platinum	400,000^{‡}
New Zealand (RMNZ)	4× Platinum	120,000^{‡}
Switzerland (IFPI Switzerland)	Platinum	20,000^{‡}
United Kingdom (BPI)	2× Platinum	1,200,000^{‡}
^{‡} Sales+streaming figures based on certification alone.

== Release history ==
Release history and formats for "Boy's a Liar"
Region	Date	Format	Version	Label(s)	Ref.
Various	30 November 2022	Digital download; streaming	Original	Warner Music UK	
Various	3 February 2023	Digital download; streaming	Remix	Warner Music UK	
France	13 February 2023	Digital download; streaming	Remix	WEA/Warner Records	
United States	7 March 2023	Rhythmic contemporary radio	Remix	300 Elektra	
