= Take Me Home (EP) =

EP by PinkPantheress
- Released: 16 December 2022
- Recorded: 2021–2022
- Length: 7:40
- Label: Warner
- Producers: Mura Masa; Kaytranada; Phil; Future Cut; Kearneyonline

PinkPantheress chronology
To Hell with It (Remixes) (2022)	Take Me Home (2022)	Heaven Knows (2023)

Singles from Take Me Home
- 1. "Do You Miss Me?" Released: 15 November 2022; 2. "Boy's a Liar" Released: 30 November 2022

Take Me Home (stylized in sentence case) is the debut extended play (EP) by British singer-songwriter and record producer PinkPantheress, released on 16 December 2022 through Warner Records. It follows her 2021 mixtape To Hell with It and precedes her debut studio album, Heaven Knows. Production was handled by the Future Cut, Phil, Kaytranada, Mura Masa, and Kearneyonline. The EP was promoted with the singles "Do You Miss Me?" and "Boy's a Liar".

== Background ==
Take Me Home is a three-track extended play by English singer-songwriter and record producer PinkPantheress. Before release, PinkPantheress said, "I wanted to give a Christmas gift for anyone in need of some upbeat music."

The production was handled by the Future Cut, Phil, Kaytranada and Mura Masa. The EP was released through Warner Records. The EP was supported by two singles "Do You Miss Me?" and "Boy's a Liar".

== Critical reception ==
Professional ratings
Review scores
Source	Rating
Pitchfork	6.8/10

Shaad D'Souza of Pitchfork said the EP adds consistency and expression without quite adding onto PinkPantheress' primary, already much-emulated pop formula.

== Track listing ==
Take Me Home track listing
No.	Title	Writer(s)	Producer(s)	Length
1.	"Boy's a Liar"	Victoria Walker; Alexander Crossan	PinkPantheress; Mura Masa	2:29
2.	"Do You Miss Me?"	Walker; Hykeem Carter	Kaytranada; Phil; Dill Aitchison	2:24
3.	"Take Me Home"	Walker	Future Cut	2:54
Total length:				7:40

== Personnel ==
Credits adapted from Tidal.

- PinkPantheress – vocals, programming, vocal engineering
- Phil – programming
- Iyiola Babalola – percussion, programming (track 3)
- Mura Masa – bass, guitar, keyboards, percussion (track 1)
- Darren Lewis – programming (track 3)
- Kaytranada – guitar, percussion, programmer, producer (track 2, 3)
- Jonny Breakwell – mixing
