= Heaven Knows (PinkPantheress album) =

2023 studio album by PinkPantheress

Studio album by PinkPantheress
- Released: 10 November 2023
- Recorded: 2023
- Genres: UK garage; dance pop
- Length: 34:10
- Label: Warner UK
- Producers: PinkPantheress; Greg Kurstin; Mura Masa; Phil; Oscar Scheller; Cash Cobain; Count Baldor; Bnyx; Presplay; Wonder; London on da Track; Vitals; Danny L Harle; Sam Gellaitry; F1lthy; RISC

PinkPantheress chronology
Take Me Home (2022)	Heaven Knows (2023)	Heaven Knows (Remixes) (2023)

Singles from Heaven knows
- 1. "Boy's a Liar Pt. 2" Released: 3 February 2023; 2. "Mosquito" Released: 29 September 2023; 3. "Capable of Love" Released: 12 October 2023; 4. "Nice to Meet You" Released: 10 November 2023

Heaven Knows (stylized in sentence case) is the debut studio album by the British singer-songwriter and record producer PinkPantheress, released through Warner UK on 10 November 2023. It follows her 2021 mixtape To Hell with It and includes the singles "Boy's a Liar Pt. 2" with Ice Spice, "Mosquito", "Capable of Love", and "Nice to Meet You" featuring Central Cee. A remix album of Heaven Knows was released on 7 December 2023 through digital download; it was also supposed to have a CD release, but was supposedly cancelled due to unknown reasons.

== Background ==
In an interview with NME on 3 February 2023, PinkPantheress expressed her desire to make "a shift towards other styles of music" and revealed plans to potentially release her debut album later that year. Following the success of "Boy's a Liar Pt. 2" in early 2023 and the release of "Mosquito" in September, PinkPantheress announced the album on 12 October. She stated that the album is an "accumulation of music [she has] made over the last two years", and is thematically about "being at peace with yourself in your aloneness" as well as "journeying from hell into purgatory, but I'm OK with being there".

PinkPantheress said in a May 2026 interview that Heaven Knows was a bid to "appeal more" to a commercial audience, which the artist said made it feel divorced from her real persona.

== Promotion ==
PinkPantheress released the remix "Boy's a Liar Pt. 2" with Ice Spice in February 2023, followed by the single "Mosquito" in late September 2023. The album was announced on social media on 12 October 2023, with PinkPantheress sharing the cover art and the third single "Capable of Love". An accompanying tour titled Capable of Love Tour began in February 2024 with stops in Europe, the United Kingdom, the US, and Canada.

== Critical reception ==
Professional ratings
Aggregate scores
Source	Rating
AnyDecentMusic?	7.4/10
Metacritic	80/100
Review scores
Source	Rating
AllMusic	4/5 stars
Clash	9/10
Dork	5/5 stars
The Guardian	3/5 stars
The Line of Best Fit	8/10
NME	4/5 stars
Paste	7.8/10
Pitchfork	6.4/10
The Telegraph	4/5 stars

Heaven Knows received a score of 80 out of 100 on review aggregator Metacritic based on 15 critics' reviews, indicating "generally favorable" reception. Larisha Paul of Rolling Stone wrote that "if PinkPantheress often seems adrift in apprehension and loneliness, she inhabits the LP's different purgatorial states with the same confidence that made her early releases so appealing", remarking that she is "never quite distressed" and when she "hits a dead end, she just builds a new road forward from scratch". Dork's Abigail Firth found that the album "retains PinkPantheress' creative spirit but repackages it in a much slicker, Mura Masa-assisted production", calling it "an entirely limitless record". Tanatat Khuttapan of The Line of Best Fit stated that "a whiff of mortality and reincarnation accompanies the majority of Heaven Knows" and felt that the "more satisfactory outcome of collaboration is the album's charismatic sound design" provided by its producers.

Alex Rigotti of NME stated that "there's also plenty of moments where Pink challenges her own sound, one that has previously seen her pigeonholed into a 'Y2K meets drum 'n' bass' label tirelessly. There's organs, tablas, drill bass slides, and rock-inspired drums on Heaven Knows, all of which suggest a commitment to artistry that will continue beyond this debut". Reviewing the album for AllMusic, Paul Simpson described it as "a fully developed refinement of the brisk, intricately arranged pop style she's become known for, with lyrics about romantic infatuations set to pulse-quickening liquid drum'n'bass, U.K. garage, and filter-house rhythms". Colin Joyce of Pitchfork opined that PinkPantheress "transforms her jittery, emotional miniatures into pop songs that feel more extroverted, more joyful, and sometimes more complete" and also "flexes her abilities as a writer, producer, and curator of guest spots".

=== Accolades ===
Critics' rankings for Heaven Knows
Publication	Accolade	Rank	Ref.
Complex	The 50 Best Albums Of 2023	32	
Rolling Stone	The 100 Best Albums of 2023	64	
Slant	The 50 Best Albums of 2023	30	

== Track listing ==
Heaven Knows track listing
No.	Title	Writer(s)	Producer(s)	Length
1.	"Another Life" (featuring Rema)	PinkPantheress; Greg Kurstin; Rema	Kurstin; PinkPantheress; Mura Masa^{[a]}; Count Baldor^{[a]}	2:52
2.	"True Romance"	PinkPantheress; Kurstin; Daniel Aroesti	Kurstin; PinkPantheress; Mura Masa^{[a]}; Phil^{[a]}	2:16
3.	"Mosquito"	PinkPantheress; Oscar Scheller; Kurstin	Kurstin; PinkPantheress; Mura Masa^{[a]}; Phil^{[a]}	2:27
4.	"The Aisle"	PinkPantheress; Phil; Scheller	Scheller; PinkPantheress; Phil; Mura Masa^{[a]}	2:45
5.	"Nice to Meet You" (featuring Central Cee)	PinkPantheress; Gary James Kemp; Count Baldor; Central Cee; Cash Cobain	Cash Cobain; Count Baldor; PinkPantheress; Mura Masa^{[a]}; Phil^{[a]}	2:42
6.	"Bury Me" (featuring Kelela)	PinkPantheress; Phil; Kelela; Bnyx; Bethel Da Silva Neto; Presplay	Bnyx; Presplay; PinkPantheress; Wonder; Phil; Mura Masa^{[a]}; Count Baldor^{[a]}	2:04
7.	"Internet Baby" (Interlude)	PinkPantheress; Phil; London on da Track; Vitals	London on da Track; PinkPantheress; Vitals; Mura Masa^{[a]}; Phil^{[a]}	2:11
8.	"Ophelia"	PinkPantheress; Danny L Harle	Harle; PinkPantheress; Mura Masa; Count Baldor^{[a]}; Phil^{[a]}	2:35
9.	"Feel Complete"	PinkPantheress; Ozedkius; Oxlade; Alexander Crossan	Mura Masa; PinkPantheress	2:43
10.	"Blue"	PinkPantheress; Sam Gellaitry	PinkPantheress; Gellaitry; Mura Masa^{[a]}	3:01
11.	"Feelings"	PinkPantheress; Bnyx; F1lthy	Bnyx; F1lthy; PinkPantheress	2:40
12.	"Capable of Love"	PinkPantheress; Risc	PinkPantheress; Risc; Phil^{[a]}; Mura Masa^{[a]}; Count Baldor^{[a]}	3:43
13.	"Boy's a Liar Pt. 2" (with Ice Spice) (bonus track)	PinkPantheress; Crossan; Isis Gaston	PinkPantheress; Mura Masa	2:11
Total length:				34:10

Notes All tracks are stylized in sentence case

- ^{^[a]} signifies an additional producer
- Physical editions feature a solo version of "Nice to Meet You", an alternate version of "Bury Me", and a demo version of "Feelings" in place of the originals.

Sample credits

- "Another Life" contains an interpolation of "Ice Cream", performed by f(x), written by Kim Bumin and composed by Hitchhiker
- "True Romance" contains an interpolation of "Five Colors In Her Hair", performed by McFly, written by Graig Hardy
- "Mosquito" contains an interpolation of "Way Back", performed by Skrillex, written by Skrillex
- "The Aisle" contains a sample of "Supalonely", performed and written by Benee.
- "Nice to Meet You" contains a sample of "Gold", performed by Spandau Ballet, written by Gary Kemp. It also contains an interpolation of "Sleep Talk", performed and written by Zion.T.
- "Feel Complete" contains a sample of "Ku Lo Sa", performed and written by Oxlade.
- "Blue" contains a sample of "Kickstarts", performed and written by Example.

== Personnel ==
=== Musicians ===
- PinkPantheress – vocals, programming
- Mura Masa – programming (tracks 1–12); bass, guitar, keyboards, percussion (13)
- Count Baldor – programming (1, 5, 6, 8, 12)
- Greg Kurstin – programming (1–3)
- Rema – vocals (1)
- Phil – programming (2–12)
- Tom Levesque – backing vocals (3)
- Oscar Scheller – programming (4)
- Cash Cobain – programming (5)
- Central Cee – vocals (5)
- Bnyx – programming (6, 11)
- Kelela – vocals (6)
- London on da Track – programming (7)
- Vitals – programming (7)
- Danny L Harle – programming (8)
- Sam Gellaitry – programming (10)
- F1lthy – programming (11)
- Risc – programming (12)
- Ice Spice – vocals (13)

=== Technical ===
- Stuart Hawkes – mastering
- Kevin Grainger – mixing (1, 4, 8)
- Spike Stent – mixing (2)
- Jonny Breakwell – mixing (3, 12, 13), engineering (12), vocal engineering (1, 2, 4–11)
- Mike Dean – mixing (5)
- Derek "206derek" Anderson – mixing (6, 7, 11)
- Stan Greene – mixing (6, 7, 11)
- Nathan Boddy – mixing (6, 9, 10)
- Julian Burg – engineering (1–3)
- Greg Kurstin – engineering (1–3)
- Matt Tuggle – engineering (1–3)
- Noah Glassman – engineering (2–4, 8, 11), vocal engineering (11)
- Ryan Rajagopa – engineering (5)
- Sam Gellaitry – engineering (10)
- RiotUSA – engineering (13)
- Luke Farnell – mixing assistance (13)

== Charts ==
Chart performance for Heaven Knows
Chart (2023)	Peak position
Australian Albums (ARIA)	98
Belgian Albums (Ultratop Flanders)	102
Canadian Albums (Billboard)	59
French Albums (SNEP)	166
Hungarian Physical Albums (MAHASZ)	21
Irish Albums (Official Charts)	16
New Zealand Albums (RMNZ)	30
Scottish Albums (Official Charts)	22
Swiss Albums (Schweizer Hitparade)	84
UK Albums (Official Charts)	28
US Billboard 200	61

== Certifications and sales ==
Certifications for Heaven Knows
Region	Certification	Certified units/sales
Canada (Music Canada)	Gold	40,000^{‡}
^{‡} Sales+streaming figures based on certification alone.
