= To Hell with It =

2021 mixtape by PinkPantheress

Mixtape by PinkPantheress
- Released: 15 October 2021
- Recorded: January – September 2021
- Genres: Dance-pop; liquid drum and bass; UK garage
- Length: 18:36
- Labels: Parlophone; Elektra
- Producers: PinkPantheress; Oscar Scheller; Izco; Jkarri; Mura Masa; Zach Nahome; Dill Aitchison; Kairos Laferme; Adam F

PinkPantheress chronology
| To Hell with It (2021) | To Hell with It (Remixes) (2022) |

Singles from To Hell with It
- 1. "Break It Off" Released: 4 June 2021; 2. "Pain" Released: 7 June 2021; 3. "Passion" Released: 1 July 2021; 4. "Just for Me" Released: 13 August 2021; 5. "I Must Apologise" Released: 6 October 2021

To Hell with It (stylised in all lowercase) is the debut mixtape by the British singer-songwriter and record producer PinkPantheress, released through Parlophone and Elektra Records on 15 October 2021. The mixtape, which runs for slightly over 18 minutes, features production from PinkPantheress herself, as well as from Oscar Scheller, Izco, Natalia Fletcher, Jkarri, Mura Masa, Zach Nahome, Kairos Laferme, Adam F, and Dill Aitchison. PinkPantheress began posting snippets of her songs to TikTok in early 2021, including "Pain" and "Break It Off", both of which went viral on the platform. She subsequently signed to Parlophone and Elektra Records, through which she released three of the mixtape's singles–"Passion", "Just for Me", and "I Must Apologise".

Heavily inspired by the 2000s, with lyrics that address topics including failed relationships, adolescence, abandonment, and longing, To Hell with It is a dance-pop, liquid drum and bass, and UK garage record that heavily utilises sampling and takes elements from several different genres, such as alt-pop, bedroom pop, hyperpop, pop-punk, jungle, 2-step, R&B, and dembow.

Upon its release, To Hell with It received acclaim from critics, who praised its use of samples, its nostalgic quality, and PinkPantheress's vocals. It appeared on several year-end lists, including those published by Billboard, Time, and Rolling Stone. The mixtape debuted at number 20 on the UK Albums Chart and at number 36 on the Irish Albums Chart. All five of the mixtape's singles entered the UK Singles Chart upon their release, with two of them ("Pain" and "Just for Me") peaking in the top 40 of the chart. A remix album of To Hell with It was released on 28 January 2022.

== Background and release ==
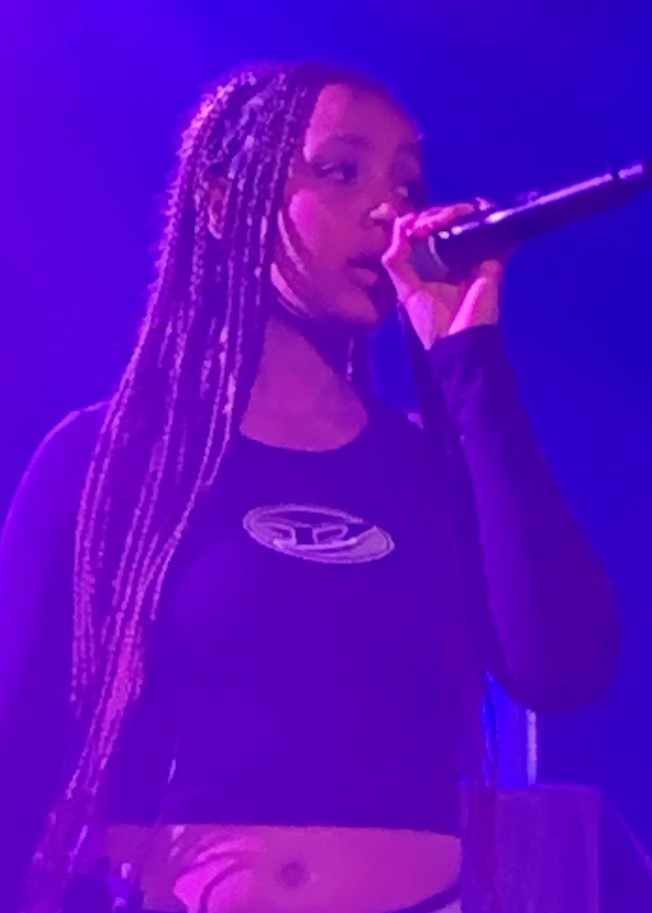
PinkPantheress in 2022

In early 2021, PinkPantheress started recording one song a day, taking an hour a day after coming home from university to write and record 20-second loops, which she posted as short-form videos on the social media platform TikTok to reach a wider audience. In January 2021, one of these loops, a 12-second snippet of her song "Pain", was posted to TikTok with the caption, "Day 11 of posting a song every day bc [sic] i have nothing else to do," and it quickly gained attention on the platform. Soon after, she posted snippets of her songs "Last Valentines" and her breakout single "Break It Off", the latter of which went viral on TikTok, and she was subsequently signed to Parlophone Records and Elektra Records.

PinkPantheress released the single "Passion" in July 2021, followed by "Just for Me" in August 2021. "Just for Me" went viral on TikTok and was used in over two million videos on the platform. PinkPantheress announced the release of the mixtape and revealed its title on 1 October 2021. "I Must Apologise" was released as the mixtape's fifth single on 6 October.

After FaceTiming her friends to ask what she should title the mixtape, PinkPantheress chose To Hell with It per one friend's suggestion, which she also stated was a representation of her saying, "To hell with it," and releasing the full versions of songs that had previously only been released as snippets. She chose not to release To Hell with It as a studio album due to feeling that it was not "developed enough". Its cover, photographed by Brent McKeever, depicts PinkPantheress standing in front of a mansion at night with lightning striking behind it.

In addition to digital platforms, To Hell with It was released physically on CD and as a limited edition vinyl record for Record Store Day 2022.

== Composition and production ==
To Hell with It is a dance-pop, liquid drum and bass, and UK garage record heavily inspired by music from the early 2000s, and it contains many samples, as well as elements of bedroom pop, hyperpop, drum and bass, jungle, 2-step, and pop-punk. The mixtape runs for 18 minutes and 36 seconds, with none of the songs exceeding three minutes in length. PinkPantheress used topline writing to write the songs on it, which she described as "new nostalgic". The first half of the mixtape is made up of songs recorded by PinkPantheress at home, which were mixed and mastered for the mixtape, while the second half consists of songs recorded in studios.

Produced by PinkPantheress, "Pain" is a UK garage song which runs for one minute and 38 seconds and samples the 2000 single "Flowers" by UK garage duo Sweet Female Attitude. On it, PinkPantheress addresses her longing for an ex over a "woozy", two-note keyboard loop and a lofi hip hop beat, and sings "la la las" throughout the song, which were inspired by her writer's block. The song ends with a slower, pitched-down version of the chorus. On "I Must Apologise", which was co-produced by Oscar Scheller and runs for under two minutes, PinkPantheress sings about how she cannot help herself from lying to her lovers. It is uptempo and has bedroom pop-inspired production with "stirring", "skittering" breakbeats and synths, and it heavily samples Crystal Waters's 1991 house single "Gypsy Woman". "Last Valentines" is a "dance-tinged", "emo-leaning", "drum-heavy" garage, pop-punk, and liquid drum and bass song with "ominous" production and a double-time beat that samples rock band Linkin Park's song "Forgotten" from their 2000 album Hybrid Theory and discusses a failed relationship. "Passion" is a "confessional" jungle and alt-pop song, inspired by R&B and written about PinkPantheress's loneliness after getting abandoned by her friends and family and looking for a place to stay the night. It was produced by Izco and Jkarri and is two minutes and 18 seconds long.

"Just for Me" is a "wistful", "funky", "2000s-inspired" bedroom pop, 2-step garage, and alternative pop song produced by British record producer Mura Masa, who also programmed and played drums and keyboards on the song, which runs for slightly less than two minutes. In it, PinkPantheress sings over a "snappy", "nostalgia-fueled" garage beat and "delicate", "gentle" guitars, about having an unhealthy obsession with a crush and going to lengths such as finding their house and sleeping with their hair under her pillow. She described the song as the spiritual successor to "Pain". "Noticed I Cried", produced by Oscar Scheller, is a drum and bass song that runs for slightly more than one minute. It was the first song of hers not produced by her, and has "bubbly" production, a "stuttering", "high-octane" beat, and "melancholy" lyrics, and samples a minimal synth line from the 2005 song "And Yet..." by Signaldrift. The drum and bass song "Reason", produced by Zach Nahome, contains deep bass and lyrics about PinkPantheress's "restless, spiralling mindstate" and her fear of the future. "All My Friends Know" is a "hypnotic" R&B and dembow song produced by Dill Aitchison and Kairos Laferme, two of PinkPantheress's friends from her "school days". It has a Drake-inspired beat, which samples pianos and birdsong from the song "Wind Glider" from Sven Torstenson's 1987 album Sky Odyssey, and is about PinkPantheress's anxiety over the end of her relationship and her inability to tell anyone that it ended. The "slow and sensual" "Nineteen" is a "reflective" song whose lyrics discuss PinkPantheress's adolescence, and the loneliness, heartache, and anxiety that have come with it. She also discusses her friends not recognizing her, her failing her A-Levels, and her favourite store closing. It samples violins from the title track of Toco's 2007 album Outro Lugar and contains a low bassline and the sounds of crashing waves.

== Commercial performance ==
To Hell with It debuted at number 20 on the UK Albums Chart and at number 36 on the Irish Albums Chart. The mixtape also debuted at number 73 on the Billboard 200 chart and at number 27 on the New Zealand Albums Chart.

== Critical reception ==
Professional ratings
Aggregate scores
| Source | Rating |
|---|---|
| AnyDecentMusic? | 8.2/10 |
| Metacritic | 86/100 |
Review scores
| Source | Rating |
| And It Don't Stop | A |
| Clash | 9/10 |
| DIY | 4/5 stars |
| Dork | 4/5 stars |
| Gigwise | 9/10 stars |
| HipHopDX | 4.3/5 |
| The Line of Best Fit | 9/10 |
| NME | 5/5 stars |
| Pitchfork | 7.3/10 |
| Rolling Stone | 4/5 stars |

To Hell with It received widespread acclaim in reviews from music critics upon release. At Metacritic, which assigns a normalised rating out of 100 to reviews from professional publications, the album has an average score of 86, based on 10 reviews, indicating "universal acclaim". Chris DeVille of Stereogum called To Hell with It "a breezy 18-minute introductory statement" that "establish[es] Pinkpantheress's talent for breathy, fragile, tender-but-chilly topline melodies". NME's Ben Jolley called the songs on To Hell with It "breathless and adventurous", and noted that the mixtape "hits the sweet spot that fans of her viral hits have fallen for: unobvious sample choices and rave-y, 90s-referencing breakbeats production, coupled with her childlike vocal, nostalgic songwriting and concise diaristic lyrics." For The New York Times, Jon Caramanica called To Hell with It "striking", describing its songs as "immediate and flexible" and the samples as "suggestive, but not delineative", also writing that "even her singing encapsulates the tension of memory." Jeff Ihaza of Rolling Stone called To Hell with It "strikingly present", writing that it "feels like the kind of genuine and heartfelt openness that the internet once promised", adding that PinkPantheress is "especially gifted [as a songwriter] in meeting themes of despair with unwavering grace."

DIY's Chris Taylor described To Hell with It as "a heady mix of '00s genres and references that only seem to work together because it's delivered with just the right amount of earnestness". David Weaver of Clash described PinkPantheress's voice as "a key ingredient" on the mixtape, and called the melodies "catchy, simple, and effectual", the production "fantastic", "clean", and "uncluttered", and the sampling "both sweetly nostalgic and knowingly urbane". Uproxx's Caitlin White stated that the mixtape "pulls from so many different sounds and shapes them into a cohesive whole, one that's spiked with both nostalgia and future-yearning emotion". For HipHopDX, Matthew Ritchie called the mixtape "dangerously addicting and affecting" and full of "soul and life", writing that "To Hell with It embodies the ethos of [the 2000s], avoiding the pitfalls of prior artists that latch onto nostalgia as a gimmick" and that "PinkPantheress's voice is the key to what sets her apart." Writing for Gigwise, Joe Smith wrote that the mixtape is "a synthesis of a country's collective youth" that "changes everything" and "never lacks substance". Hayley Milross of The Line of Best Fit wrote, "Dripping in 2000s nostalgia in a time where the term 'Y2K' is thrown around like confetti, To Hell with It feels genuine." James Keith of Complex UK called it "as forward-facing as it is coyly nodding to what came before".

For Billboard, Jason Lipshutz wrote that To Hell with It "does not labor its points or overstay its welcome" and "is the sound of a rising star understanding and dominating the format that fits her best". Dork's Martyn Young described the mixtape's "vibe" as "old school meshing with new school in sweet harmony" and made up of "perfectly-formed intimate earworms". Paste's Jade Gomez described the mixtape as "fleshed out" and wrote that it "captures a distinct Y2K nostalgia very well". For Pitchfork, Arielle Gordon wrote that, on To Hell with It, PinkPantheress "adds an undeniably contemporary spin on her trove of samples", describing her voice as "strangely soothing" and "an ethereal, pixelated miasma that breaks from the earnest delivery of her British predecessors". NPR's Mano Sundaresan wrote that the mixtape "serves more as a soft launch than a grand statement" and that the songs on it "feel like hazy dreams from a bygone era."

=== Accolades ===
To Hell with It was named the second best album of 2021 by Variety's Jem Aswad, the third best album of 2021 by Time, and the fifth best album of the year by The New York Times's Jon Caramanica, Rolling Stone's Rob Sheffield, The Line of Best Fit, and Gigwise. The mixtape was selected as the ninth best album of the year by Slant and the tenth best album of the year by The Ringer and Okayplayer, and also appeared on year-end lists published by Billboard, Rolling Stone, NPR, Complex, AllMusic, The Independent, The Fader, Teen Vogue, and The Guardian.

== Track listing ==
To Hell with It track listing
| No. | Title | Writer(s) | Producer(s) | Length |
|---|---|---|---|---|
| 1. | "Pain" | Martin Green; Mike Powell; PinkPantheress | PinkPantheress | 1:38 |
| 2. | "I Must Apologise" | Crystal Waters; Neal Conway; Oscar Scheller; PinkPantheress | Scheller; PinkPantheress | 1:48 |
| 3. | "Last Valentines" | Brad Delson; Chester Bennington; David Farrell; Joseph Hahn; Mark Wakefield; Mike Shinoda; PinkPantheress; Robert Bourdon | PinkPantheress | 1:13 |
| 4. | "Passion" | Izco; Jkarri; PinkPantheress | Izco; Jkarri | 2:18 |
| 5. | "Just for Me" | Alexander Crossan; PinkPantheress | Mura Masa | 1:56 |
| 6. | "Noticed I Cried" | Franz Buchholtz; Scheller; PinkPantheress | Scheller; PinkPantheress | 1:22 |
| 7. | "Reason" | PinkPantheress; Zach Nahome | PinkPantheress; Nahome | 2:11 |
| 8. | "All My Friends Know" | PinkPantheress; Sven Tortenson | Dill Aitchison; Kairos Laferme | 1:58 |
| 9. | "Nineteen" | Dill Aitchison; PinkPantheress; Tomaz di Cunto | Aitchison | 2:33 |
| 10. | "Break It Off" (bonus track) | Adam F; PinkPantheress | Adam F; PinkPantheress | 1:36 |
| Total length: | | | | 18:36 |

5th anniversary edition
| No. | Title | Writer(s) | Producer(s) | Length |
|---|---|---|---|---|
| 11. | "Attracted To You" | PinkPantheress; Jack Allsopp | PinkPantheress; Jack Allsopp; Jay Reynolds | 1:08 |
| Total length: | | | | 19:44 |

Notes

- "Pain" samples "Flowers", written by Mike Powell and Martin Green.
- "I Must Apologise" samples "Gypsy Woman", written by Neal Conway and Crystal Waters.
- "Last Valentines" samples "Forgotten", written by Brad Delson, Chester Bennington, David Farrell, Joseph Hahn, Mark Wakefield, Mike Shinoda, and Robert Bourdon.
- "Noticed I Cried" samples "And Yet...", written by Franz Buchholtz.
- "All My Friends Know" samples "Wind Glider", written by Sven Tortenson.
- "Nineteen" samples "Outro Lugar", written by Tomaz Di Cunto.
- "Break It Off" samples "Circles", written by Adam F.

== Personnel ==
Musicians

- PinkPantheress – vocals (all tracks), programming (1–3, 6–10)
- Oscar Scheller – bass, drums, keyboards, programming, synthesizer (2, 6)
- Jkarri – guitar (4)
- Dill Aitchison – additional keyboards (5), bass programming, drums, keyboards, synthesizer (8)
- Mura Masa – drums, keyboards, programming (5)
- Zach Nahome – bass, drums, guitar, keyboards, programming (7)
- Kairos Laferme – bass programming, guitar, keyboards, synthesizer (8)
- Dom Munns – guitar (9)
- Adam F – programming (10)

Technical

- PinkPantheress – mastering (1, 10), mixing (3), engineering (2–4)
- Stuart Hawkes – mastering (2–5, 7–10)
- Matt Colton – mastering (6)
- Jonny Breakwell – mixing (2, 5–9), engineering (5)
- Adam F – mixing, engineering (10)
- Izco – mixing, engineering (4)
- Jkarri – engineering (4)
- Mura Masa – engineering (5)
- Finn Howells – engineering (7–9)

Creative

- Brent McKeever – photography (mixtape cover, bespoke CD booklet)
- Myles Xavier – art direction (mixtape cover, bespoke CD booklet)

== Remix album ==
A remix album of To Hell with It, titled To Hell With It (Remixes), was released on January 28, 2022 through Elektra and Parlophone Records. The album was partially developed by British producer Anz, who posted a teaser for the album a week before its release. It includes remixes of every song on the mixtape, including a remix of "Pain" by Powfu, a remix of "I Must Apologise" by Tommy Gold, a remix of "Last Valentines" by WondaGurl, a remix of "Reason" by Jarreau Vandal, a remix of "Just for Me" by El Guincho, a remix of "All My Friends Know" by Anz, a remix of "Passion" by Sam Gellaitry, and a drum and bass remix of "Noticed I Cried" by Flume.

== Charts ==
Chart performance for To Hell with It
| Chart (2021–2026) | Peak position |
|---|---|
| Australian Albums (ARIA) | 78 |
| Belgian Albums (Ultratop Flanders) | 188 |
| Hungarian Physical Albums (MAHASZ) | 14 |
| Hungarian Vinyl Albums (MAHASZ) | 6 |
| Irish Albums (Official Charts) | 36 |
| Lithuanian Albums (AGATA) | 20 |
| New Zealand Albums (RMNZ) | 27 |
| Portuguese Albums (AFP) | 6 |
| Scottish Albums (Official Charts) | 29 |
| UK Albums (Official Charts) | 20 |
| US Billboard 200 | 73 |

== Certifications ==
Certifications for To Hell with It
| Region | Certification | Certified units/sales |
|---|---|---|
| New Zealand (RMNZ) | Platinum | 15,000^{‡} |
| United Kingdom (BPI) | Gold | 100,000^{‡} |
^{‡} Sales+streaming figures based on certification alone.

== Release history ==
Release history for To Hell with It
| Region | Version | Date | Format(s) | Label | Ref. |
|---|---|---|---|---|---|
| Various | Original | 15 October 2021 | CD; digital download; streaming | Parlophone; Elektra | |
| Various | Remix | 28 January 2022 | Cassette; USB; digital download; streaming | Parlophone; Elektra | |
| Various | Original | 23 April 2022 | LP | Parlophone; Elektra | |
