= Malpractice (Redman album) =

Studio album by Redman
- Released: May 22, 2001
- Recorded: 2000–2001
- Genre: East Coast hip-hop
- Length: 78:39
- Labels: Def Squad; Def Jam
- Producers: Da Mascot; Erick Sermon; Adam F; Rockwilder; Saukrates; Diverse; DJ Twinz

Redman chronology
Blackout! (1999)	Malpractice (2001)	How High: Soundtrack (2001)

Singles from Malpractice
- 1. "Let's Get Dirty (I Can't Get in da Club)" Released: May 1, 2001; 2. "Smash Sumthin'" Released: July 3, 2001

Professional ratings
Aggregate scores
Source	Rating
Metacritic	59/100
Review scores
Source	Rating
AllMusic	2.5/5 stars
HipHopDX	3.5/5
Los Angeles Times	3/4 stars
NME	4.5/5 stars
Q	4/5 stars
RapReviews	8/10
Rolling Stone	2.5/5 stars
The Source	4/5 stars
USA Today	3/4 stars
The Village Voice	(dud)

Malpractice is the fifth studio album by rapper Redman. The album was released on May 22, 2001. It reached number four on US Billboard 200 and was certified gold by the RIAA on July 21, 2001. The album has sold around 683,000 copies. It boasted two singles: "Let's Get Dirty (I Can't Get in da Club)" and "Smash Sumthin'".

== Background ==
The album experienced delays before its release. Originally scheduled to be released on December 12, 2000 (as found in the booklet for Ja Rule's Rule 3:36 album), the album was then delayed to April 17, 2001 (Redman's 31st birthday). The album was ultimately released in May 2001.

== Commercial performance ==
Malpractice debuted at number four on the US Billboard 200 chart, selling 148,000 copies in its first week, becoming Redman's first US top ten album as a solo act and marks his highest first-week sales. On June 21, 2001, the album was certified gold by the Recording Industry Association of America (RIAA) for sales of over 500,000 copies. As of October 2009, the album has 686,000 copies in the United States.

== Track listing ==
No.	Title	Writer(s)	Producer(s)	Length
1.	"Roller Coaster Malpractice (Intro)" (featuring Adam F & G. Forbes)	Reggie Noble; Adam Fenton; Gary Forbes	Redman; Adam F	1:41
2.	"Diggy Doc"	Noble; Erick Sermon; George Clinton, Jr.; Tracy Curry	Erick Sermon	1:56
3.	"Lick a Shot"	Noble; Sermon	Erick Sermon	3:38
4.	"Let's Get Dirty (I Can't Get in da Club)" (featuring DJ Kool)	Noble; Dana Stinson; John Bowman	Rockwilder	3:56
5.	"WKYA (drop)"	Noble	Redman	2:04
6.	"2-Way Madness (skit)"	Noble	Redman	1:30
7.	"Real Niggaz" (featuring Scarface, Treach, Mally G and Icarus)	Noble; Sermon; Anthony Criss; Jamal Phillips; Brad Jordan; Neil Phillips	Erick Sermon	5:15
8.	"Uh-Huh"	Noble; Karl Wailoo	Big Soxx	3:44
9.	"Da Bullshit" (featuring Icarus)	Noble; Sermon; N. Phillips	Erick Sermon	4:23
10.	"Who Wants to Fuck a Millionaire (skit)"	Noble	Redman	2:55
11.	"Enjoy Da Ride" (featuring Method Man, Saukrates and Streetlife)	Noble; William Stewart; Clifford Smith; Wailoo; Patrick Charles	Diverse	4:14
12.	"Jerry Swinger Stickup (skit)"	Noble	Redman	3:31
13.	"J.U.M.P." (featuring George Clinton)	Noble; Sermon	Erick Sermon	3:49
14.	"Muh-Fucka"	Noble; Raymond Grant; Richard Grant; Winfred Lovette; James Moore; Kenneth Nash; Charles Reed; Claude Truesdale	DJ Twinz	3:20
15.	"Bricks Two" (featuring Double O, D-Don, Roz, and Shooga Bear)	Noble; Sermon	Erick Sermon	5:21
16.	"Wrong 4 Dat" (featuring Keith Murray)	Noble; Sermon; Keith Murray	Erick Sermon	2:43
17.	"Judge Juniqua (skit)"	Noble	Redman	2:16
18.	"Dat Bitch" (featuring Missy Elliott)	Noble; Melissa Elliott; Barry Green; Ronald Roker; Gerry Shury	Redman	3:54
19.	"Doggz II" (featuring DMX)	Noble; Earl Simmons; Clinton, Jr.; Garry M. Shider; David L. Spradley	Redman	4:42
20.	"Whut I'ma Do Now"	Noble; Stinson	Rockwilder	4:47
21.	"Soopaman Luva 5 (Part I)"	Noble; Sermon; Curtis Mayfield	Erick Sermon	2:14
22.	"Soopaman Luva 5 (Part II)"	Noble	Redman	3:20
23.	"Smash Sumthin'" (featuring Adam F)	Noble; Fenton	Adam F; DJ Destruction (add.)	3:35
Total length:				78:39

Sample credits

- "Diggy Doc" contains interpolations from "The D.O.C. & The Doctor", written by George Clinton, Jr. and Tracy Curry.
- "Who Wants to Fuck a Millionaire" contains a sample of "For My Thugs", written by Shawn Carter, Dana Stinson, Malik Cox, Dwight Grant, and Amil Whitehead; performed by Funkmaster Flex & Big Kap featuring Jay-Z, Memphis Bleek, Beanie Sigel & Amil.
- "Muh-Fucka" contains a sample from "Soul Train", written by Winfred Lovette, James Moore, Kenneth Nash, Charles Reed, and Claude Truesdale; and performed by the Manhattans.
- "Judge Juniqua" contains melodic interpolations from "Theme from The People's Court", written by Alan Tew.
- "Dat Bitch" contains a sample from "Devil's Gun", written by Barry Green, Ronald Roker, and Gerry Shury; and performed by C. J. & Company.
- "Doggz II" contains a sample from "Atomic Dog", written by George Clinton, Jr., Garry M. Shider, and David L. Spradley; and performed by George Clinton.
- "Soopaman Luva 5 (Part I)" contains interpolations from "He's a Fly Guy", written by Curtis Mayfield.
- "Smash Sumthin'" contains a sample of "O Verona", written by Craig Armstrong, Nellee Hooper, and Marius de Vries.

== Personnel ==
- DMX – additional vocals (19)
- Dillon Dresdow – engineer (14, 16)
- Adam F – skit performer (2, 6, 12, 17); arrangement, direction, mixing, and additional engineering (23)
- G. Forbes – skit performer (2, 6, 12, 17)
- Martini Harris – skit performer (2, 6, 12, 17)
- Mike Hogan – engineer (1)
- Pete Horowitz – engineer (13)
- Jewell – additional vocals (18)
- Mike Koch – engineer (5, 14, 20)
- Ken Lewis – engineer (15)
- Kevin Liles – executive producer
- Thomas Lytle – skit performer (2, 6, 12, 17)
- Nasty Naj – skit performer (2, 6, 12, 17)
- Reggie Noble – executive producer
- Michael Pamin – engineer (3, 18)
- Erick Sermon – executive producer
- Dr. Boom Shot – background vocals (3)
- Te Te – skit performer (2, 6, 12, 17)
- Tommy Uzzo – engineer (2–4, 7–9, 11, 19, 21–23), mixing (1–5, 7–9, 11, 13–16, 18–22)
- L. Stu Young – engineer (11)

== Album singles ==
Single information
"Let's Get Dirty (I Can't Get in Da Club)"
- Released: May 1, 2001
- B-side:
"Smash Sumthin'"
- Released: July 3, 2001
- B-side: "Diggy Doc"

== Charts ==
=== Weekly charts ===
Chart (2001)	Peak position
Belgian Albums (Ultratop Wallonia)	39
Canadian Albums (Billboard)	18
French Albums (SNEP)	40
German Albums (Offizielle Top 100)	62
Swiss Albums (Schweizer Hitparade)	74
UK Albums (Official Charts)	57
US Billboard 200	4
US Top R&B/Hip-Hop Albums (Billboard)	1

=== Year-end charts ===
Chart (2001)	Position
Canadian R&B Albums (Nielsen SoundScan)	49
US Billboard 200	137
US Top R&B/Hip-Hop Albums (Billboard)	57

=== Singles ===
Year	Single	Peak chart positions		
Year	Single	US Hot 100	US R&B/Hip-Hop	US Rap
2001	Let's Get Dirty (I Can't Get In Da Club)	97	46	9
2001	Smash Sumthin	—	87	24
"—" denotes releases that did not chart.

== Certifications ==
Region	Certification	Certified units/sales
United Kingdom (BPI)	Silver	60,000^{*}
United States (RIAA)	Gold	500,000^{^}
^{*} Sales figures based on certification alone.^{^} Shipments figures based on certification alone.
