= Break It Off (PinkPantheress song) =

2021 single by PinkPantheress

Single by PinkPantheress

from the album To Hell with It
- Released: 4 June 2021
- Genre: Drum and bass; experimental pop
- Length: 1:35
- Label: Parlophone; Elektra
- Songwriters: PinkPantheress; Adam Fenton
- Producers: PinkPantheress; Adam F

PinkPantheress singles chronology
| "Break It Off" (2021) | "Pain" (2021) |

"Break It Off" is a song by British singer-songwriter and record producer PinkPantheress. It was officially released on 4 June 2021 through Elektra and Parlophone Records, as her debut single and serving as the lead single from her debut mixtape To Hell with It which was released later the same year. An uptempo drum and bass and experimental pop song about heartbreak, it was written and produced by PinkPantheress and Adam F, and samples F's song "Circles". A snippet of the song went viral on TikTok, and it subsequently peaked at number 74 on the UK Singles Chart and at number 30 on the Billboard Hot Rock & Alternative Songs chart. A visualizer for the song was directed by Malt Disney and released on 21 June 2021.

== Background and composition ==
"Break It Off" is an uptempo, "heartbreak-infused" drum and bass and experimental pop song with "sugary" vocals from PinkPantheress, who wrote and produced the song while she was at university, which samples the drum and bass song "Circles" by English DJ Adam F. DIY's Chris Taylor described it as "a tale of late-night yearning", and Steffanee Wang of Nylon called it "a dizzying mix of breakbeats and edgy pop elements". After PinkPantheress posted a clip of the song to TikTok in March, it went viral and was used in over 500,000 videos on the platform.

== Reception and commercial performance ==
David Renshaw of The Fader called "Break It Off" "an algorithm-breaking bolt from the blue, destined to be played on repeat throughout the summer months". Douglas Greenwood of i-D called the song an "earworm" while Complex's Seamus Fay described it as a "fast-paced, oddball single". Stereogum's Chris DeVille described the song as a "playfully flirtatious melodic flutter", with Steffanee Wang of Nylon stated that it was "a great primer for the unpinnable vibe of [PinkPantheress's] vibe: simultaneously new and nostalgic." Jon Caramanica of The New York Times called the song "elegant in [its] own right" and wrote that it "encapsulate[s] the enthusiasm and thrill of listening to someone else's elegant song, one that rousts you from your shell and thrusts you into your own joy or sadness".

"Break It Off" peaked at number 74 on the UK Singles Chart and at number 30 on Billboard's Hot Rock & Alternative Songs chart.

== Music video ==
A visualizer for "Break It Off", directed by Malt Disney, was released on 21 June 2021. The video uses footage of demolition, car crashes, and memes with "abstract" animations superimposed over it. PinkPantheress called the visualizer a "doozy".

== Credits and personnel ==
Credits adapted from AllMusic.

- PinkPantheress – vocals, songwriting, production, programming, mastering
- Adam F – songwriting, production, programming, engineering, mixing
- Stuart Hawkes – mastering

== Charts ==
=== Weekly charts ===
Weekly chart performance for "Break It Off"
| Chart (2021) | Peak position |
|---|---|
| UK Singles (Official Charts) | 74 |
| US Hot Rock & Alternative Songs (Billboard) | 30 |

=== Year-end charts ===
Year-end chart performance for "Break It Off"
| Chart (2021) | Position |
|---|---|
| US Hot Rock & Alternative Songs (Billboard) | 78 |

== Certifications ==
Certifications for "Break It Off"
| Region | Certification | Certified units/sales |
|---|---|---|
| Canada (Music Canada) | Gold | 40,000^{‡} |
| New Zealand (RMNZ) | Platinum | 30,000^{‡} |
| United Kingdom (BPI) | Gold | 400,000^{‡} |
^{‡} Sales+streaming figures based on certification alone.
