= Kaos: The Anti-Acoustic Warfare =

Studio album by Adam F
- Released: 10 September 2001
- Genres: Hip hop; hardcore rap
- Label: EMI
- Producers: Adam Fenton; Ross Emmins; Kim Spikes

Adam F chronology
Colours (1997)	Kaos: The Anti-Acoustic Warfare (2001)	Drum and Bass Warfare (2002)

Singles from Colours
- 1. "Stand Clear" Released: September 2001; 2. "Where's My..." Released: March 2002; 3. "Smash Sumthin'" Released: 19 August 2002; 4. "Listen Here" Released: October 2002; 5. "Dirty Harry's Revenge" Released: 2 December 2002; 6. "Karma" Released: 27 January 2003

Professional ratings
Review scores
Source	Rating
AllMusic	4/5 stars
BBC Music	Favourable
Drowned in Sound	10/10

Kaos: The Anti-Acoustic Warfare is the second studio album by English musician Adam F. It was released on 10 September 2001 through EMI. The album moves away from the drum and bass music from Colours (which Adam F described as "a phase"), and instead features hip hop music with almost every song featuring a vocalist. Upon release, the album reached number 44 on the UK Albums Chart.

== Background ==
The album was promoted by its singles which landed on the UK Singles Chart. "Smash Sumthin" (featuring Redman) peaking at 11, Adam F's highest-charting single to date, "Stand Clear" (featuring M.O.P.) in 2001 peaking at 43, "Where's My..." (featuring Lil' Mo) in 2002 peaking at 50, and "Dirty Harry's Revenge" (featuring Beenie Man) also peaking at number 50.

== Track listing ==
CD, vinyl and cassette
No.	Title	Length
1.	"Kaos Main Title" (featuring Royal Symphonia)	1:12
2.	"Smash Sumthin'" (featuring Redman)	3:20
3.	"Stand Clear" (featuring M.O.P.)	3:59
4.	"Listen Here" (featuring Capone-N-Noreaga)	5:27
5.	"Where's My..." (featuring Lil' Mo)	3:45
6.	"Greatest of All Time" (featuring LL Cool J)	4:05
7.	"News Flash" (reporting Huggy Bear)	1:36
8.	"Dirty Harry's Revenge" (featuring Beenie Man and Siamese)	3:13
9.	"Time 4 Da True" (featuring Davie and Pos from De La Soul and DV Alias Khryst)	4:14
10.	"Karma (Comes Back Around)" (featuring Guru and Carl Thomas)	5:24
11.	"End of Days Interregnum"	0:56
12.	"Last Dayz" (featuring Pharoahe Monch)	3:09
13.	"Time Is Up Outro"	0:43
14.	"Trans Mission"	0:22

== Charts ==
Chart (2001)	Peak position
UK Albums (Official Charts Company)	44
