= Let's Get Dirty (I Can't Get in da Club) =

"Let's Get Dirty (I Can't Get In Da Club)"

Single by Redman featuring DJ Kool

from the album Malpractice
- Released: May 1, 2001
- Studio: Westlake Recording Studios (California)
- Genre: Hip hop
- Length: 4:09
- Label: Def Jam
- Songwriters: Reginald Noble; John Bowman; Dana Stinson
- Producer: Rockwilder

Redman singles chronology
"Oooh." (2000)	"Let's Get Dirty (I Can't Get In Da Club)" (2001)	"Smash Sumthin'" (2001)

Music video
- "Let's Get Dirty (I Can't Get In Da Club)" on YouTube

"Let's Get Dirty (I Can't Get in da Club)" is a hip hop song by American rapper Redman featuring guest vocals from DJ Kool. It was released on May 1, 2001 through Def Jam Recordings as the lead single from Redman's fifth solo studio album Malpractice. Recording sessions took place at Westlake Recording Studios in California with engineer Tommy Uzzo. Production was handled by Rockwilder.

The single peaked at number 97 on the Billboard Hot 100, number 46 on the Hot R&B/Hip-Hop Songs and number 9 on the Hot Rap Songs in the United States.

In his album review for AllMusic, Jason Birchmeier described the song as a "nice moment" on Malpractice. Alex Needham of NME called the song "a banger – a record that picks up the gauntlet left last year by DMX's bone-crushing rap anthem 'Party Up'".

The song was featured in video games Tony Hawk's Pro Skater 3 and Def Jam: Fight for NY.

The song was later re-created by Christina Aguilera as "Dirrty". Her version was the lead single of her second album Stripped. That song also features a guest rap from Redman and was also produced by Rockwilder. "Let's Get Dirty" additionally features a remix featuring British virtual band Gorillaz.

== Track listing ==
No.	Title	Length
1.	"Let's Get Dirty (I Can't Get in da Club)" (Radio Edit)
2.	"Let's Get Dirty (I Can't Get in da Club)" (LP Version)
3.	"Let's Get Dirty (I Can't Get in da Club)" (Instrumental)
4.	"Let's Get Dirty (I Can't Get in da Club)" (Acappella)

== Charts ==
Chart (2001)	Peak position
US Billboard Hot 100	97
US Hot R&B/Hip-Hop Songs (Billboard)	46
US Hot Rap Songs (Billboard)	9
