= Dirrty =

Single by Christina Aguilera featuring Redman

from the album Stripped
- B-side: "I Will Be"; "Make Over"
- Released: September 3, 2002
- Recorded: May 10, 2002
- Studio: The Enterprise (Burbank); Conway Recording (Hollywood)
- Genre: R&B; hip hop
- Length: 4:58
- Label: RCA
- Songwriters: Christina Aguilera; Dana Stinson; Balewa Muhammad; Reginald Noble
- Producers: Dana Stinson; Christina Aguilera; Balewa Muhammad; Jasper Cameron

Christina Aguilera singles chronology
"Falsas Esperanzas" (2001)	"Dirrty" (2002)	"Beautiful" (2002)

Redman singles chronology
"Smash Sumthin'" (2001)	"Dirrty" (2002)	"React" (2002)

Music video
- "Dirrty" on YouTube

"Dirrty" is a song by American singer Christina Aguilera featuring American rapper Redman, released as the lead single from her fourth studio album Stripped. Despite Aguilera's first three years of commercial success, she was displeased with the lack of control over her image. Desiring to create a song that would represent her authentic persona, she approached hip hop producer Rockwilder and suggested using Redman's 2001 song "Let's Get Dirty (I Can't Get in da Club)" as a guide. The final result, "Dirrty", is an R&B and hip hop song that also features rapping verses from Redman and describes sexual activities.

RCA Records sent "Dirrty" to American radio stations on September 3, 2002; RCA and Bertelsmann Music Group later released the song as a CD single. The song peaked at number 48 on the US Billboard Hot 100. Outside of the United States, "Dirrty" saw significant success in the British Isles, topping the charts in Ireland and the United Kingdom. Elsewhere, the song peaked within the top ten in many countries including Australia, Denmark, Germany, the Netherlands, Spain, Sweden and Switzerland.

The controversial music video for "Dirrty", directed by David LaChapelle, publicized Aguilera's new image by depicting sexual fetishes such as mud wrestling and muscle worshipping, thus eliminating her previous image as a bubblegum pop singer. It was criticized by various news publications and other recording artists, and was even banned on Thai television, but Aguilera defended it as inspirational as it put her to the forefront. "Dirrty" was included on the setlists of Aguilera's five major concert tours: The Justified & Stripped Tour (2003), The Stripped Tour (2003), Back to Basics Tour (2006–2008), The Liberation Tour (2018), and The X Tour (2019).

== Development ==
"Off the back of 'Lady Marmalade,' which I produced, we clicked and started hanging out. I didn't know she was breaking out of her shell and turning into 'Xtina.' We were out at a club (...), and she heard 'Let's Get Dirty' by Redman. She hops across the table and says, 'Oh my god, you make me a song like this and we're outta here!'. That's why she sings "'Let's Get Dirty,' that's my jam," on the song. Before that, I actually wasn't going to submit for that album because I was a hip-hop producer."

— Songwriter and producer Rockwilder on "Dirrty" and Aguilera.

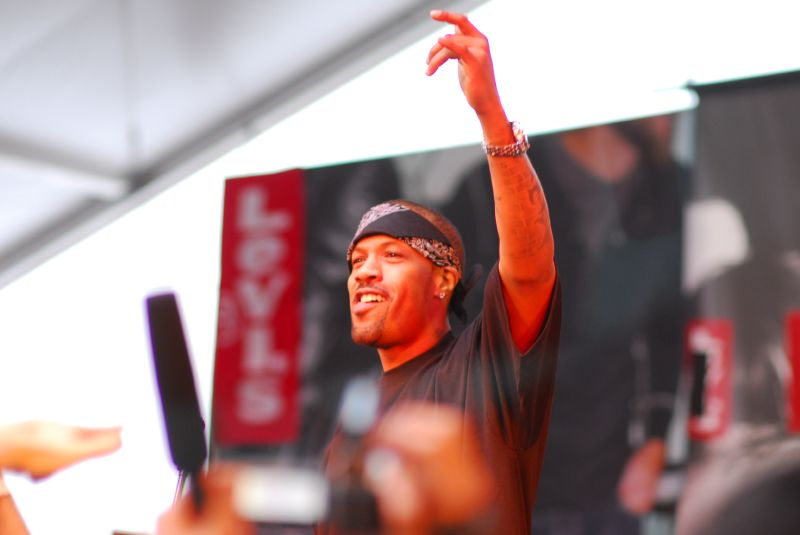
"Dirrty" was created in the vein of Redman (pictured)'s 2001 hip hop song "Let's Get Dirty (I Can't Get in da Club)", who is later featured on the song.

Despite rising to prominence with the commercial success of her 1999 self-titled debut album, Aguilera was displeased with being marketed as her then-manager Steve Kurtz desired, and felt unable to control her image. She explained to The Sydney Morning Herald her dissatisfaction with being a part of the late 1990s teen pop trend, "The label [RCA Records] wanted to push the cookie-cutter, [...] almost virginal kind of imagery that wasn't me. I really wanted to squirm away from that, because I really thought it was really fake and superficial and untrue of what I was about."

"Dirrty" was among the last tracks to be recorded for Aguilera's 2002 album, Stripped. It was recorded at the Enterprise Studios in Burbank and Conway Studios in Hollywood, Los Angeles by Oscar Ramirez, Wassim Zreik, and Dylan "3-D" Dresdow. Desiring to create a "down and dirty" song to complement her new image, she approached hip hop producer Rockwilder, who had worked with her on "Lady Marmalade", and suggested recording a song similar to Redman's 2001 hip hop song "Let's Get Dirty (I Can't Get in da Club)". "Dirrty" ultimately became a "near-remake" of its predecessor, as Entertainment Weekly said. Rapper Redman, who previously appeared on Eminem's 2001 song "Off the Wall", in which Eminem disses Aguilera, is featured on the song. Aguilera intended to use a misspelled title to personalize the song, also considering "Dirtee" or "Dirrdy". The title reflects the music video, which Aguilera describes as "gritty, [with] underground, illegal stuff going on."

== Composition ==
"Dirrty" is a hip hop and R&B song. Composed in the key of G minor, it has a moderately fast tempo of 100 beats per minute. The lines in the refrain and Redman's rapping verses are emphasized by a pair of B♭ octave dyads. Aguilera's vocal range on the track spans F_{3} to F#_{5}. According to Stylus Magazine's Todd Burns, the song features a bassline which "doesn't quite mesh with the song in a natural way" and an "effective" overdubbing technique. The song's lyrics detail sexual activities such as table dancing. Jon Pareles noted that Aguilera was determined to shed her teen pop image that she achieved with her early works, and decided to show her sexuality and aggression in the "self-explanatory" "Dirrty". A sequel to the song entitled "Still Dirrty" was recorded by Aguilera for her 2006 album, Back to Basics.

== Release and chart performance ==
"Dirrty" was released as the lead single from Stripped. RCA Records encouraged Aguilera to release the ballad "Beautiful" as the first single from Stripped. Aguilera insisted on releasing "Dirrty" as the lead single, as she felt that it represented her "real" persona. After a leak in August, RCA Records sent "Dirrty" to US pop and rhythmic radio stations on September 3, 2002. It debuted at number 64 on the Hot 100 Airplay chart on September 21, 2002, and rose to number 49 the following week. It dropped one place to number 50 on the chart issue dated October 5, 2002. RCA Records released it in the United States as a 12-inch single on September 24, 2002, and as a CD single with "I Will Be" as a B-side on October 14. Another US CD featuring "Make Over" as its B-side was released on December 10. "Dirrty" was also released as a CD single in Germany on October 14, and in the United Kingdom on November 11 by RCA and Sony Music Entertainment.

"Dirrty" was Aguilera's first single to fail to enter the top 20 of the US Billboard Hot 100, peaking at number 48 on October 5, 2002. It debuted at number 67 on September 21, 2002, and rose to number 49 the following week. "Dirrty" additionally charted at number 14 on Top 40 Mainstream, number 20 on Rhythmic Top 40, and number 22 on Top 40 Tracks. It reached number four on the Billboard Hot 100 Singles Sales chart in late December 2002. On October 14, 2022, it was certified platinum by the Recording Industry Association of America (RIAA) for shipments of 1,000,000 copies.

Outside of the United States, "Dirrty" debuted at number seven on the Canadian Singles Chart in Canada on November 30, 2002, and later peaked at number five on February 15, 2003.

In the United Kingdom, the single debuted at the top of the UK Singles Chart on November 17, 2002—for the week ending date November 23, 2002—becoming Aguilera's third number one and remaining on the top spot for two weeks, and was certified platinum by the British Phonographic Industry.

The song reached the top 10 of the charts in many other European countries including Ireland (number one), Netherlands (number two), Norway, Spain, and Switzerland (number three), Belgian Flanders, Denmark, and Germany (number four), and Austria and Hungary (number five). Overall, the song peaked at number three on the European Hot 100 Singles chart on December 7, 2002.

"Dirrty" also peaked at number four on the ARIA Singles Charts in Australia and was certified platinum by the Australian Recording Industry Association.

== Critical reception ==
"Dirrty" received mixed reviews from music critics, some praised its production, while others criticized the heavily sexual persona Aguilera adopted on the song. Cinquemani from Slant Magazine called it "the most instantly gratifying" song from Stripped. Todd Burns from Stylus Magazine labeled it "one of the most interesting songs of the year" and compared its styles to Britney Spears' "image transformation" on "I'm a Slave 4 U". In a separate review, Burns deemed it the best single of 2002, writing, "That's what pop music is all about, appealing to as many people as possible." Writing for The Guardian, Betty Clarke described the song's lyrics as "majestically filthy." Dotmusic editor Ian Watson praised the song's production, noting that it is "interesting chiefly for the pneumatic rhythm and guttural cabaret". Carcy Magazine complimented the song as "raw" and "powerful". Reviewing Aguilera's 2008 compilation album Keeps Gettin' Better: A Decade of Hits, Nick Levine from Digital Spy called "Dirrty" the "sluttiest, sweatiest club banger in recent memory."

Jancee Dunn called the release of "Dirrty" as the lead single "a shame" and opined that it misrepresented the rest of the album. Likewise, Stephen Thomas Erlewine from AllMusic was disappointed towards the track's being released as the lead single and found Aguilera's vocal range in the song too narrow. Michael Paoletta from Billboard called the song "horribly derivative", while NME's Jim Wirth said that "Dirrty" was "probably the pick of an inconsistent crop." Entertainment Weekly critic Seymour Craig gave it a D−, calling Aguilera's voice "desperate and shrill," and found it to be an unsuccessful attempt to gain street cred. "Dirrty" won the Best Single award at the 2003 Q Awards. The song also earned a Grammy nomination for Best Pop Collaboration with Vocals at the 45th Grammy Awards, but lost to Santana's "The Game of Love" featuring Michelle Branch.

In 2022, Billboard ranked "Dirrty" at number twenty-two on its list of the hundred greatest 2002 songs, calling it "a blueprint to reinvention in the pop game".

== Music video ==
=== Background and synopsis ===
A scene from the music video for "Dirrty", in which Aguilera performs the slutdrop. The music video is credited as the origin of the slutdrop, which later became popular among female artists.

The music video for "Dirrty" was directed by David LaChapelle. It was filmed on September 8–10, 2002, in Los Angeles, at an abandoned newspaper print building. Aguilera took boxing lessons to prepare for the video, and more than 100 dancers auditioned. Aguilera wanted to make sure that she and LaChapelle had the same vision for the video, never wanted to be "glossy or pretty." A scene where Aguilera is lowered into a boxing ring in a cage and a dance routine in the ring were filmed on the first day. The following day, a foxy boxing scene, a table dancing part, a party scene with Redman's rapping his verse, and a shower scene were filmed. The video premiered on MTV on September 30, 2002, on Making the Video, and was described as "a post-apocalyptic orgy."

The video opens with Aguilera gearing up and riding a motorcycle into a nightclub. Wearing a bikini and chaps, she is lowered from a cage into a boxing ring and dances, accompanied by several backup dancers. A masked woman is lowered into the ring, and the two engage in foxy boxing. The scene is intercut with sequences of Aguilera dancing in a red belly top, which she later removes to reveal a bra, and a microskirt. Redman then proceeds down a hallway, passing people such as mud wrestlers, a contortionist, and furries. The video proceeds to a scene of Aguilera and backup dancers splashing and dancing while being sprayed with water in a room. It features several sexual fetishes, from mud wrestling to muscle worshipping.

=== Reception and impact ===
Billboard placed "Dirrty" at number twenty six on its 2018 list of the greatest music videos of the 21st century, saying it contained "one of the most explosive image resets in history". Despite controversy, "Dirrty" is considered to be Aguilera's most recognized music video, with the singer herself calling it her "personal favorite from her catalog" in 2018, even wearing the infamous chaps from the video on both her Liberation Tour (2018) and her Vegas residency Christina Aguilera: The Xperience (2019–2020).

"With the Stripped album, Christina redefined the 21st century female pop performer. This album put to death the idea of compulsory 'chastity' of female singers that had taken hold in years prior. I mean, can you name a single big name who has felt the need to inform the world that she was a virgin in the music game since? Following Stripped, artists like Britney Spears and Beyoncé became more comfortable expressing sexuality and no longer felt the need to sell the notion of innocence. The cookie cutter lane had been closed."

— Terry Young, Jr. of the Hampton Institute on the video's impact

"Dirrty" was picked as the fifth greatest music video throughout TRL history in the final countdown on November 16, 2008. LA Weekly selected it as the fourth greatest music video on TRL, writing: "Ass-less chaps: An underutilized pop star accessory." The video was nominated for Best Female Video, Best Dance Video, Best Pop Video, and Best Choreography at the 2003 MTV Video Music Awards. It also earned six nominations at the 2003 Music Video Production Association Awards, and won two: Best Styling and Best Make-Up. The video ranked at number 100 on Slant Magazine's list of "The 100 Greatest Music Videos of All Time" in 2003. In late 2008, the video was voted the ninth "Sexiest Music Video of All Time" by over a quarter of a million FHM readers in a poll the magazine ran worldwide. It also appeared at number two on VH1 list of "Scandalously Sexy Music Videos" in 2013.

When Aguilera's collaborator Linda Perry first saw the video, she asked Aguilera: "Are you high? This is annoying. Why are you doing this?" Protests also occurred in Thailand over Thai-language posters in the video that translate to "Thailand's Sex Tourism" and "Young Underage Girls". LaChapelle stated that he was unaware of what the posters stated, and Aguilera's recording company in the country banned Thai television stations from playing the video.

The public widely rejected Aguilera's new image so much that it began to overshadow her music. Tim Walker from The Independent wrote: "[Aguilera] simulated masturbation while wearing little more than a pair of leather chaps." Entertainment Weekly described Aguilera's image in the video as "the world's skeeziest reptile woman," and The Village Voice captioned her as a xenomorph from the Alien series. Aguilera's contemporaries Shakira, Kelly Osbourne, and Jessica Simpson expressed disapproval of the video. Time magazine commented that "she appeared to have arrived on the set... direct from an intergalactic hooker convention." Jancee Dunn of Rolling Stone dubbed the video Girls Gone Wild: Beyond Thunderdome. Writer Emma Forrest remarked: "What she's depicting is subcultures within sexuality, and to say that this is normal young woman's sexuality is just not fair. Even Madonna never did that to girls." Aguilera responded to the criticism in Blender:

I like to shock—I think it's inspiring. I love to play and experiment, to be as tame or as outlandish as I happen to feel on any given day. When you are bold and open, artistically speaking, in music and in video, a whole bunch of people automatically feel threatened by you, especially in Middle America... OK, I may have been the naked-ass girl in the video, but if you look at it carefully, I'm also at the forefront. I'm not just some lame chick in a rap video; I'm in the power position, in complete command of everything and everybody around me. To be totally balls-out like that is, for me, the measure of a true artist.

In 2017, Amy Roberts of Bustle noticed that Aguilera received a sexist, misogynistic backlash because of "Dirrty's" music video, while also remarking that it "wasn't made to specifically fulfill heterosexual male fantasies". According to Roberts, the video was "grimy and subversive, and it had an overbearing aggressive sexuality that wasn't accessible to the masses". She further praised the video as "raw", "visceral" and "ahead of time", and believed "it was exactly what the music industry needed to happen in the early '00s" because of its inappropriateness. In 2025, Carcy Magazine praised the video, saying that "Aguilera grabs the codes of a patriarchy that wants her 'dirty' and turns them against it, pushing the limits of a sexuality that had been, until then, deeply hypocritical".

Despite the criticism, the video was a number-one video on MTV's countdown series TRL in October 2002.

== Live performances ==
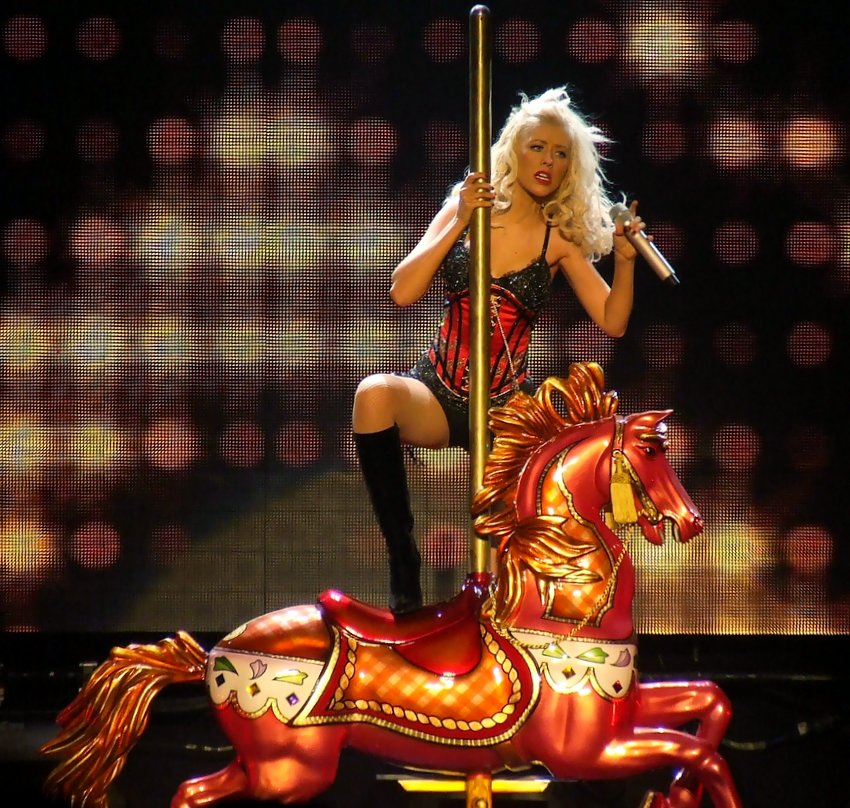
Aguilera performing "Dirrty" on the Back to Basics Tour in Dublin, November 21, 2006

Aguilera's first televised performance of "Dirrty" was for a program called TRL Presents: Christina Stripped in New York City in October 2002. Next she performed the song at the 2002 MTV Europe Music Awards in Barcelona, recreating the music video's scenes and wearing the same chaps as she did in the video for the performance. She later performed the song on UK television shows CD:UK and Top of the Pops in 2002, and then as part of a medley with "Fighter" at the 2003 MTV Video Music Awards in August 2003, which was backed by guitarist Dave Navarro.

"Dirrty" was included on the setlists of Aguilera's three major concert shows. For the 2003 Justified & Stripped Tour and Stripped Tour, it was the opening song on the setlists. For the performance, Aguilera appeared in torso-baring black outfit and black hair, which, according to the San Francisco Chronicle's Neva Cholin and MTV's Christina Fuoco, resembled Cher's styles. The performance at the Wembley Arena in London was recorded for the 2004 video release Stripped Live in the U.K.. "Dirrty" was also included on the setlist of Aguilera's 2006–2008 Back to Basics Tour, as part of the circus segment. The performance incorporated elements of "Cell Block Tango" from the Broadway musical Chicago, and "Entrance of the Gladiators" by Julius Fučík, and featured a carousel horse. Ben Walsh from The Independent highlighted "Dirrty" as the best song of the concert. However, The Observer's Kitty Empire called it "blushery." The performance at the Adelaide Entertainment Centre in Adelaide was recorded for the 2008 video release Back to Basics: Live and Down Under.

In May 2016, Aguilera performed the song during the Mawazine music festival in front of a crowd of 250,000 people. In July 2021, she performed "Dirrty" for two nights at the Hollywood Bowl with Gustavo Dudamel and the Los Angeles Philharmonic. Aguilera also sang excerpts from the song during the 47th People's Choice Awards, and selected it as a show opener for her Expo 2020 concert in Dubai. In May 2023, Aguilera and Redman performed the song during Usher's Lovers & Friends music festival in Las Vegas, and in September 2023 Aguilera sang "Dirrty" at the EuroPride concert in Malta.

== Legacy ==
Slant ranked "Dirrty" at number sixty-two on its list of the best singles of the 2000s — Sal Cinquemani called it "more of a statement than an actual song". Freaky Trigger listed it at number sixty-four on its compilation of the Top 100 [Greatest] Songs of All Time. Covers of the song were recorded by Ed Sheeran and Hanson. "Dirrty" was featured the sixth season of RuPaul's Drag Race All Stars, performed by Kylie Sonique Love and Manila Luzon. In the How I Met Your Father episode titled "Dirrty Thirty" a Christina Aguilera-themed birthday party is planned, focusing on the song and its music video. In 2020, the British magazine i-D ranked the song at number four on a list of the Best Pop Comebacks of the 21st Century, calling the choice to release it as a single "immaculate". Carcy Magazine opined that "Dirrty" "changed the trajectory" in the history of pop music.

Playboy placed "Dirrty" at number eight on its list of "the 40 Sexiest Music Videos of All Time". Wrestler Liv Morgan wore outfits that paid tribute to Aguilera's "Dirrty" attire at the Royal Rumble in 2021 and 2024. Troye Sivan's 2023 music video for "Rush" was compared to "Dirrty", and his previous video for "My My My!" was directly inspired by scenes from "Dirrty", as he confirmed in his interview for WPST. Similarly, Halsey's music video for "You Should Be Sad" was noted to resemble a video for "Dirrty" by Aguilera, whom the singer confirmed as a source of inspiration. The music video for Tate McRae's 2023 single "exes" also drew comparisons to "Dirrty" for having similar scenes, outfits, and choreography. Other music stars and celebrities such as Miley Cyrus, Kylie Jenner, and Aguilera herself have also worn outfits inspired by the music video years later.

In September 2025, the stars of the comedy drama television series Overcompensating paid tribute to the song in the video from the show's set. The same series also referenced Aguilera's attire from the music video in the episode featuring pop culture-specific costumes.

== Formats and track listings ==
- American 12" vinyl single
1. "Dirrty" [no rap edit] – 4:01
2. "I Will Be" – 4:12
3. "Dirrty" – 4:58
- European CD maxi single
1. "Dirrty" [no rap edit] – 4:01
2. "I Will Be" – 4:12
3. "Dirrty" – 4:58
4. "Dirrty" (video) – 4:49
- American CD single
1. "Dirrty" – 5:00
2. "Make Over" – 4:12
- Dance Vault Mixes digital EP
1. "Dirrty" [Tracy Young Radio] – 4:06
2. "Dirrty" [Tracy Young Club] – 8:40
3. "Dirrty" [MaUVe Remix] – 8:11

== Credits and personnel ==
Credits are adapted from the liner notes of Stripped.

Recording location

- Recorded at The Enterprise Studios, Burbank, California and Conway Studios, Hollywood, Los Angeles, California

Personnel

- Songwriting – Christina Aguilera, Dana Stinson, Balewa Muhammad, Reginald Noble, Jasper Cameron
- Production – Rockwilder, Christina Aguilera
- Vocals – Christina Aguilera, Redman
- Background vocals – Redman
- Recording – Oscar Ramirez, Wassim Zreik, Dylan "3-D" Dresdow
- Mixing – Dave "Hard Drive" Pensado
- Assistant mixing – Ethan Willoughby

== Charts ==
=== Weekly charts ===
Weekly chart performance for "Dirrty"
Chart (2002–2003)	Peak position
Australia (ARIA)	4
Australian Dance (ARIA)	3
Australian Urban (ARIA)	2
Austria (Ö3 Austria Top 40)	5
Belgium (Ultratop 50 Flanders)	4
Belgium (Ultratop 50 Wallonia)	8
Bolivia (Notimex)	4
Canada (Nielsen SoundScan)	5
Canada CHR/Top 40 (Nielsen BDS)	27
Croatia International (HRT)	1
Denmark (Tracklisten)	4
Ecuador (Notimex)	5
Europe (European Hot 100)	3
Finland (Suomen virallinen lista)	20
France (SNEP)	98
Germany (GfK)	4
Greece (IFPI)	24
Guatemala (Notimex)	2
Hungary (Single Top 40)	5
Ireland (IRMA)	1
Italy (FIMI)	8
Netherlands (Single Top 100)	2
Netherlands (Dutch Top 40)	2
New Zealand (Recorded Music NZ)	20
Nicaragua (Notimex)	1
Norway (VG-lista)	3
Panama (Notimex)	3
Peru (Notimex)	5
Poland (Polish Airplay Chart)	18
Portugal (AFP)	7
Romania (Romanian Top 100)	94
Scottish Singles Sales (Official Charts)	1
Slovenia (RTV)	6
Spain (Promusicae)	3
Sweden (Sverigetopplistan)	6
Switzerland (Schweizer Hitparade)	3
UK Singles (Official Charts)	1
UK Hip Hop/R&B (Official Charts)	1
Uruguay (Notimex)	4
US Billboard Hot 100	48
US Pop Airplay (Billboard)	14
US Rhythmic Airplay (Billboard)	20
US CHR/Pop (Radio & Records)	14
US CHR/Rhythmic (Radio & Records)	26

=== Year-end charts ===
2002 year-end chart performance for "Dirrty"
Chart (2002)	Position
Australia (ARIA)	36
Australian Urban (ARIA)	12
Austria (Ö3 Austria Top 40)	65
Belgium (Ultratop 50 Flanders)	33
Belgium (Ultratop 50 Wallonia)	53
Canada (Nielsen SoundScan)	15
Europe (Eurochart Hot 100)	50
Germany (Media Control)	43
Ireland (IRMA)	19
Netherlands (Dutch Top 40)	45
Netherlands (Single Top 100)	16
Sweden (Hitlistan)	49
Switzerland (Schweizer Hitparade)	22
Taiwan (Yearly Singles Top 100)	36
UK Singles (OCC)	30
US Mainstream Top 40 (Billboard)	83
US Rhythmic Top 40 (Billboard)	90
US CHR/Pop (Radio & Records)	95

2003 year-end chart performance for "Dirrty"
Chart (2003)	Position
Austria (Ö3 Austria Top 40)	58
Belgium (Ultratop 50 Flanders)	78
Ireland (IRMA)	67
Netherlands (Single Top 100)	53
Sweden (Hitlistan)	97

=== Decade-end charts ===
Decade-end chart performance for "Dirrty"
Chart (2000–2009)	Position
Netherlands (Single Top 100)	49

== Certifications and sales ==
Certifications and sales for "Dirrty"
Region	Certification	Certified units/sales
Australia (ARIA)	Platinum	70,000^{^}
Belgium (BRMA)	Gold	25,000^{*}
Canada (Music Canada)	2× Platinum	160,000^{‡}
Denmark (IFPI Danmark) Physical sales	Gold	4,000^{^}
Denmark (IFPI Danmark) Digital sales + streaming	Gold	45,000^{‡}
Germany (BVMI)	Gold	250,000^{‡}
Netherlands (NVPI)	Gold	40,000^{^}
New Zealand (RMNZ)	Platinum	30,000^{‡}
Norway (IFPI Norway)	Platinum	17,500
Sweden (GLF)	Platinum	30,000^{^}
Switzerland (IFPI Switzerland)	Gold	20,000^{^}
United Kingdom (BPI)	Platinum	836,000
United States (RIAA)	Platinum	1,000,000^{‡}
^{*} Sales figures based on certification alone.^{^} Shipments figures based on certification alone.^{‡} Sales+streaming figures based on certification alone.

== Release history ==
Release dates and formats for "Dirrty"
Region	Date	Format(s)	Label(s)	Ref.
United States	September 3, 2002	Contemporary hit radio; rhythmic contemporary radio	RCA	
United States	September 24, 2002	12-inch vinyl	RCA	
Sweden	October 7, 2002	CD	RCA	
Germany	October 14, 2002	CD; maxi CD	BMG	
Australia	October 21, 2002	Maxi CD	BMG	
United Kingdom	November 11, 2002	Maxi CD	RCA	
Canada	November 12, 2002	CD	RCA	
United States	December 10, 2002	CD	RCA	
