= Smash Sumthin' =

Single by Redman and Adam F

from the album Malpractice and Kaos: The Anti-Acoustic Warfare
- B-side: "Let's Get Dirty (I Can't Get in da Club)"
- Released: July 3, 2001
- Studio: Mirror Image Studios (New York, NY)
- Genre: Hip hop
- Length: 3:34
- Label: Def Jam
- Songwriters: Reginald Noble; Adam Fenton
- Producers: Adam F; DJ Destruction (co.)

Redman singles chronology
"Let's Get Dirty (I Can't Get in da Club)" (2001)	"Smash Sumthin'" (2001)	"Dirrty" (2002)

Adam F singles chronology
"Music in My Mind" (1998)	"Smash Sumthin'" (2001)	"Stand Clear" (2001)

Music video
- "Smash Sumthin" on YouTube

"Smash Sumthin'" is a song by American rapper Redman featuring English record producer Adam F. It was released on July 3, 2001, by Def Jam Recordings as the second single from the rapper's fifth solo studio album, Malpractice, and on August 19, 2002, by Kaos Recordings as the third single from the producer's second studio album, Kaos: The Anti-Acoustic Warfare. The recording sessions took place at Mirror Image Studios in New York City, with production handled by Adam F and DJ Destruction.

In the United States, the song peaked at No. 87 on the Billboard Hot R&B/Hip-Hop Songs chart and No. 24 on the Hot Rap Songs chart. In the United Kingdom, it reached number 11 on the UK Singles Chart, number 3 on the UK Dance Singles chart, and topped the UK Hip Hop and R&B Singles chart. It also made it to No. 45 in the Netherlands and No. 98 in Switzerland.

== Track listing ==
US vinyl 12" 33 ⅓ RPM
No.	Title	Length
1.	"Smash Sumthin'" (Radio Edit)
2.	"Smash Sumthin'" (LP Version)
3.	"Smash Sumthin'" (Instrumental)
4.	"Diggy Doc" (Radio Edit)
5.	"Diggy Doc" (LP Version)
6.	"Diggy Doc" (Instrumental)

UK CD single
No.	Title	Length
1.	"Smash Sumthin'" (LP Version)
2.	"Let's Get Dirty (I Can't Get in da Club)" (LP Version)
3.	"Let's Get Dirty (I Can't Get in da Club)" (Gorillaz Remix - Extended Mix)

UK vinyl 12" 45 RPM
No.	Title	Length
1.	"Smash Sumthin" (Remix By Roni Size)
2.	"Smash Sumthin" (Remix By BC)

== Personnel ==
- Reginald "Redman" Noble – songwriter, rap vocals
- Adam Fenton – songwriter, producer, arranger, mixing, additional recording, director
- Ross "DJ Destruction" Emmins – additional producer
- Tommy Uzzo – recording
- Nellee Hooper – songwriter
- Craig Armstrong – songwriter
- Marius de Vries – songwriter
- Peter John Frederick Smith – songwriter

== Charts ==
Chart (2001)	Peak position
Netherlands (Single Top 100)	45
Switzerland (Schweizer Hitparade)	98
UK Singles (Official Charts)	11
UK Dance (Official Charts)	3
UK Hip Hop/R&B (Official Charts)	1
US Hot R&B/Hip-Hop Songs (Billboard)	87
US Hot Rap Songs (Billboard)	24
