= Flowers (Sweet Female Attitude song) =

2000 single by Sweet Female Attitude

Single by Sweet Female Attitude

from the album In Person
- Released: 3 April 2000
- Genre: R&B (Cutfather & Joe mix); UK garage (Sunship mix)
- Length: 5:00 (Sunship mix); 3:52 (Sunship edit and video version)
- Label: WEA
- Songwriters: Mike Powell; Martin Green
- Producers: Cutfather & Joe; Ceri Evans (Sunship mix)

Sweet Female Attitude singles chronology
"Flowers" (2000)	"8 Days a Week" (2000)

"Flowers" is a song by UK garage duo Sweet Female Attitude, released on 3 April 2000 as their debut single. The song uses the same chord sequence as Erik Satie's Trois Gymnopédies, and the actual piece can be heard in the version by the House & Garage Orchestra, from the 2018 album Garage Classics.

The UK garage remix by producer Sunship peaked at number two on the UK Singles Chart with first-week sales of about 80,500. It went on to become the United Kingdom's 37th-biggest-selling single of 2000 and received a double platinum certification from the British Phonographic Industry (BPI) for sales and streaming figures of at least 1,200,000 units. The duo's subsequent releases failed to replicate the commercial success of "Flowers", leading to Sweet Female Attitude being labelled as a one-hit wonder.

"Flowers" has been sampled and covered several times, most notably by DJ Spoony featuring the Sugababes and by Nathan Dawe featuring Jaykae. The latter version peaked at number 12 on the UK Singles Chart in 2020, receiving a platinum certification from the BPI.

== Background ==
The original version of "Flowers" was an R&B ballad produced by Cutfather & Joe, before being reworked into the UK garage version. The original R&B version was shelved, and that it was Sunship who discovered that version and gave it a brighter garage spin, which become the version released in April 2000.

== Critical reception ==
NME praised "Flowers" as "featherlite British pop-soul junglism" that remains "warm and huggable", emphasising how its soft-focus sheen did not blunt its charm. Andrew Ryce of Resident Advisor describes the garage edit by Sunship as "a ground-up rework ... that took a tune originally destined for R&B pop into UKG territory" and praises its crossover appeal, noting that the song remained "one of UK dance music's most enduring hits". In a list of the greatest UK No. 2 singles, "Flowers" is singled out by The Guardian for its "summer's-day soundtrack" quality and its influence on a new generation of UK pop-garage revivalists.

== Impact and legacy ==
Writing for The Guardian in 2019, music critic Alexis Petridis listed the song at number six on retrospective of the best UK garage tracks, describing the track as "utterly charming. Essentially, UK street soul repurposed to fit a new style, Todd Edwards-style vocal cut-ups and all, its chorus was hooky and infectious, its light, summer's-day atmosphere delightful". Also for The Guardian, writer Michael Cragg ranked "Flowers" second in a list of the greatest ever songs of the summer.

Mixmag included "Flowers" in its list of 40 of the best UK garage tracks released from 1995 to 2005. In September 2019, NME included the song in its roundup of the best UK garage anthems list. Capital Xtra included the song in their list of "The Best Old-School Garage Anthems of All Time".

== Music video ==
The music video for "Flowers" was directed by Pete Nilsen and Ryan Davids.

== Track listings ==
UK CD single

1. "Flowers" (Sunship edit) – 3:49
2. "Flowers" (Supa' Flyas mix) – 3:36
3. "Flowers" (Sunship mix) – 5:00
4. "Flowers" (Wackside's Tweaker mix) – 7:05

UK 12-inch single

A1. "Flowers" (Sunship mix) – 5:00
A2. "Flowers" (Sunship vs. Chunky featuring Shado Kane) – 6:22
B1. "Flowers" (Wackside's Tweaker mix) – 7:05

UK cassette single

1. "Flowers" (Sunship edit) – 3:49
2. "Flowers" (Supa' Flyas mix) – 3:36
3. "Flowers" (Solomon's Precious mix) – 5:56
4. "Flowers" (Sunship vs. Chunky featuring Shado Kane) – 6:22

German maxi-CD single

1. "Flowers" (Sunship edit) – 3:49
2. "Flowers" (Sunship mix) – 5:00
3. "Flowers" (Sunship vs. Chunky featuring Shado Kane) – 6:22
4. "Flowers" (Wackside's Tweaker mix) – 7:06
5. "Flowers" (Supa'Flyas Viva mix) – 3:34

Australian maxi-CD single

1. "Flowers" (C & J Mix) – 3:59
2. "Flowers" (Supa'Flyas Viva mix) – 3:36
3. "Flowers" (Sunship edit) – 3:50
4. "Flowers" (Wackside's Small Tweaker radio) – 3:46
5. "Flowers" (Sunship mix) – 5:02
6. "Flowers" (Wackside's Tweaker mix) – 7:06
7. "Flowers" (Solomon's Precious mix) – 5:57
8. "Flowers" (Sunship vs Chunky) – 6:24

== Charts ==
=== Weekly charts ===
Chart (2000)	Peak position
Europe (Eurochart Hot 100)	15
Germany (GfK)	85
Iceland (Íslenski Listinn Topp 40)	14
Ireland (IRMA)	48
Netherlands (Dutch Top 40)	20
Netherlands (Single Top 100)	32
Scotland Singles (OCC)	20
UK Singles (OCC)	2
UK Dance (OCC)	1

=== Year-end charts ===
Chart (2000)	Position
UK Singles (OCC)	37

== Certifications ==
Region	Certification	Certified units/sales
United Kingdom (BPI)	2× Platinum	1,200,000^{‡}
^{‡} Sales+streaming figures based on certification alone.

== DJ Spoony version ==
In 2019, the song was recorded by the Sugababes for DJ Spoony's Garage Classical album. This version reached No. 22 on the Scottish Singles Chart, No. 26 on the UK Dance Singles Chart and No. 20 on the UK Singles Downloads Chart in October 2019. On 18 October 2019, Spoony and the group performed the song on The Graham Norton Show.

=== Weekly charts ===
Chart (2019)	Peak position
Scotland Singles (OCC)	22
UK Dance (OCC)	26

== Nathan Dawe version ==
"Flowers"

Single by Nathan Dawe featuring Jaykae

from the EP If Heaven Had a Phone Line
- Released: 25 October 2019
- Length: 3:14
- Label: Atlantic; Warner
- Songwriters: Mike Powell; Martin Green
- Producer: Nathan Dawe

Nathan Dawe singles chronology
"Repeat After Me" (2019)	"Flowers" (2019)	"Lighter" (2020)

British DJ and producer Nathan Dawe released a cover version of the song as a single on 25 October 2019 through Atlantic UK. The song features a verse by rapper Jaykae, and vocals by Malika Ferguson who is uncredited. It peaked at number 12 on the UK Singles Chart.

=== Background ===
Talking to the Official Charts Company about the success of the song, Dawe said, "It's a surreal feeling. I've been pretty much working my whole music career for this achievement, so now that it's happened, it feels a bit weird. It's not the best time for everyone right now, but it's equally bad for all of us. Although I suppose it's a decent situation for myself!". He also said, "The writers of the original 'Flowers' (Mike Powell and Martin Green) have 100% of all the publishing royalties." Although Dawe re-worked some of the lyrics and added a verse by Jaykae, he insisted that "It's still Powell and Green's song, isn't it? I've seen the odd couple of tweets saying I've just used a cover for my financial gain. I'm not actually making money from the song."

=== Weekly charts ===
Chart (2020)	Peak position
Ireland (IRMA)	14
Scotland (Official Charts Company)	11
UK Singles (OCC)	12
UK Dance (OCC)	1

=== Year-end charts ===
Chart (2020)	Position
UK Singles (OCC)	33

=== Certifications ===
Region	Certification	Certified units/sales
United Kingdom (BPI)	Platinum	600,000^{‡}
^{‡} Sales+streaming figures based on certification alone.

== Other versions and samples ==
In 2018, a cover version was released by Bastille along with Rationale and James Arthur for the mixtape album Other People's Heartache Pt. 4, and the House & Garage Orchestra together with Sweet Female Attitude recorded an orchestral version for the album Garage Classics. In 2019, AJ Tracey and Jorja Smith performed a cover of the song for BBC Radio 1's Live Lounge.

"Flowers" is sampled in British girl group M.O's 2014 single "Dance On My Own", while British-Jamaican hip hop duo Krept and Konan also sampled the track for their 2018 single "Pour Me Another One". In 2021, London based artist PinkPantheress sampled the track for her single "Pain", and British rapper ArrDee sampled the backing track and chorus of "Flowers" for his single "Flowers (Say My Name)".
