= Passion (PinkPantheress song) =

Single by PinkPantheress

from the album To Hell with It
- Released: 1 July 2021
- Genre: Jungle; alternative pop
- Length: 2:18
- Label: Parlophone; Elektra
- Songwriters: PinkPantheress; Izzy Cofie; Joshua Gaskin-Brown
- Producers: Izco; Jkarri

PinkPantheress singles chronology
| "Pain" (2021) | "Passion" (2021) | "Just for Me" (2021) |

"Passion" is a song by British singer-songwriter PinkPantheress. Written alongside producers Izco and Jkarri, it was released on 1 July 2021 through Elektra and Parlophone Records as the third single off her debut mixtape To Hell with It. Backed by plucked guitar and synths, it is a jungle and alternative pop song with confessional lyrics. It received praise from critics, and peaked at number 76 on the UK Singles Chart, as well as at number 30 on the Billboard Hot Rock & Alternative Songs chart.

== Background and composition ==
A snippet of "Passion" was posted to PinkPantheress's TikTok account before the full song was released. "Passion" was produced by IZCO and Jkarri, and released through Parlophone Records on 1 July 2021. It runs for two minutes and 18 seconds, and begins with a finger-picked acoustic guitar, and is then backed by synths and a jungle breakbeat, the latter of which begins in the first chorus. The song also has influences of R&B. On it, PinkPantheress sings in an "airy", "whisper-like" tone about the "intimate details of her life", including being abandoned by her friends and family and looking for somewhere to stay the night. She described the undertones of the song as "fairly sad".

Cat Zhang of Pitchfork described PinkPantheress as sounding "listless", "misunderstood", and "slightly dazed, tiptoeing gently through reality" on the song. Beats Per Minute called "Passion" PinkPantheress's "most confessional track yet", noting her "sing-song insouciance" on the song, while NME's Isaac Chiew wrote that the song "paints a haunting portrait of loneliness". The visualizer and single cover for the song is of the default wallpaper for Windows XP.

== Critical reception and commercial performance ==
Vanessa Handy of NPR remarked that, on "Passion", PinkPantheress "rises above her past" and "cross[es] into a new dimension with the complex, futuristic sound she's embraced". NME's Isaac Chiew wrote that "Passion" "cements [PinkPantheress's] versatility as a songwriter", with Pitchfork's Cat Zhang calling "Passion" "angelic" and "another lovely release" from PinkPantheress. Robin Murray of Clash described it as "a drifting slice of imperious alt-pop" with a "patient sense of introversion" on which PinkPantheress "us[es] both inner and outer space to her advantage".

"Passion" peaked at number 73 on the UK Singles Chart. It also peaked at number 30 on Billboard's Hot Rock & Alternative Songs chart.

== Charts ==
Chart performance for "Passion"
| Chart (2021) | Peak position |
|---|---|
| UK Singles (OCC) | 73 |
| US Hot Rock & Alternative Songs (Billboard) | 30 |

== Certifications ==
Certifications for "Passion"
| Region | Certification | Certified units/sales |
|---|---|---|
| New Zealand (RMNZ) | Gold | 15,000^{‡} |
| United Kingdom (BPI) | Silver | 200,000^{‡} |
^{‡} Sales+streaming figures based on certification alone.
