= Pain (PinkPantheress song) =

2021 single by PinkPantheress

Single by PinkPantheress

from the album To Hell with It
- Released: 7 June 2021
- Genre: UK garage
- Length: 1:38
- Label: Parlophone; Elektra
- Songwriters: PinkPantheress; Martin Green; Mike Powell
- Producer: PinkPantheress

PinkPantheress singles chronology
"Break It Off" (2021)	"Pain" (2021)	"Passion" (2021)

"Pain" is a song by British singer-songwriter and record producer PinkPantheress. It was released on 7 June 2021 through Elektra and Parlophone Records, as the second single from her debut mixtape To Hell with It. A snippet of the song went viral on TikTok months prior, and it subsequently peaked at number 35 on the UK Singles Chart and at number 54 in Ireland.

== Background and composition ==
In early 2021, PinkPantheress started recording one song a day, taking an hour a day after coming home from university to write and record 20-second loops, which she posted as short-form videos on the social media platform TikTok to reach a wider audience. In January 2021, one of these loops, a 12-second snippet of her song "Pain", was posted to TikTok with the caption, "Day 11 of posting a song every day bc [sic] i have nothing else to do," and it quickly gained attention on the platform.

Produced by PinkPantheress, "Pain" is a UK garage song which runs for one minute and 38 seconds and samples a karaoke version (by EasyKaraoke) of "Flowers", a 2000 hit single by UK garage duo Sweet Female Attitude. On it, PinkPantheress addresses her longing for an ex over a "woozy", two-chord keyboard loop and a lofi hip hop beat, and sings "la la las" throughout the song, which were inspired by her writer's block. The piano part is a sampled version of French pianist Erik Satie's "Trois Gymnopédies".

== Reception and commercial performance ==
Gigwise's Joe Smith described "Pain" as "a mish-mash of Britain's urban landscapes". In September 2024, Pitchfork included "Pain" on their list of "The 100 Best Songs of the 2020s So Far", ranking it at number 90.

"Pain" peaked at number 35 on the UK Singles Chart and at number 54 in Ireland.

== Credits and personnel ==
- PinkPantheress – vocals, songwriting, production, programming, mastering

== Charts ==
2021 chart performance for "Pain"
Chart (2021)	Peak position
Ireland (IRMA)	54
New Zealand Hot Singles (RMNZ)	3
UK Singles (Official Charts)	35

2024 chart performance for "Pain"
Chart (2024)	Peak position
Lithuania (AGATA)	68

== Certifications ==
Certifications for "Pain"
Region	Certification	Certified units/sales
France (SNEP)	Gold	100,000^{‡}
New Zealand (RMNZ)	2× Platinum	60,000^{‡}
Poland (ZPAV)	Gold	25,000^{‡}
United Kingdom (BPI)	Platinum	600,000^{‡}
^{‡} Sales+streaming figures based on certification alone.
