= Just for Me =

2021 song by PinkPantheress

Single by PinkPantheress

from the album To Hell with It
- Released: 13 August 2021
- Genre: Bedroom pop; 2-step garage; alternative pop
- Length: 1:55
- Label: Parlophone; Elektra
- Songwriters: Alexander Crossan; PinkPantheress
- Producer: Mura Masa

PinkPantheress singles chronology
| "Passion" (2021) | "Just for Me" (2021) | "I Must Apologise" (2021) |

"Just for Me" is a song by British singer-songwriter PinkPantheress. Written alongside producer Mura Masa, it was released on 13 August 2021 through Parlophone and Elektra as the fourth single from her debut mixtape To Hell with It. Prior to being released, a snippet of the song posted to TikTok by PinkPantheress went viral on the platform. The bedroom pop, 2-step garage, and alternative pop song is a spiritual successor to PinkPantheress's song "Pain", and is written about her unhealthy obsession with a crush.

"Just for Me" received critical acclaim, and was named the best song of 2021 by The Fader, as well as one of the best songs of the year by Billboard, NPR, and Pitchfork. It peaked at number 27 on the UK Singles Chart and at number 49 on the Irish Singles Chart. A low resolution music video for the song, directed by PinkPantheress and Lauzza, was released on 9 September 2021, and depicts PinkPantheress singing to a crowd of depressed youths. "Just for Me" was sampled by Central Cee in his song "Obsessed with You", and covered by Giveon for BBC Radio 1Xtra's Live Lounge and by Coldplay for BBC Radio 1's Live Lounge. It was later nominated for the Best Contemporary Song Ivor Novello Award in May 2022.

== Background, release, and composition ==
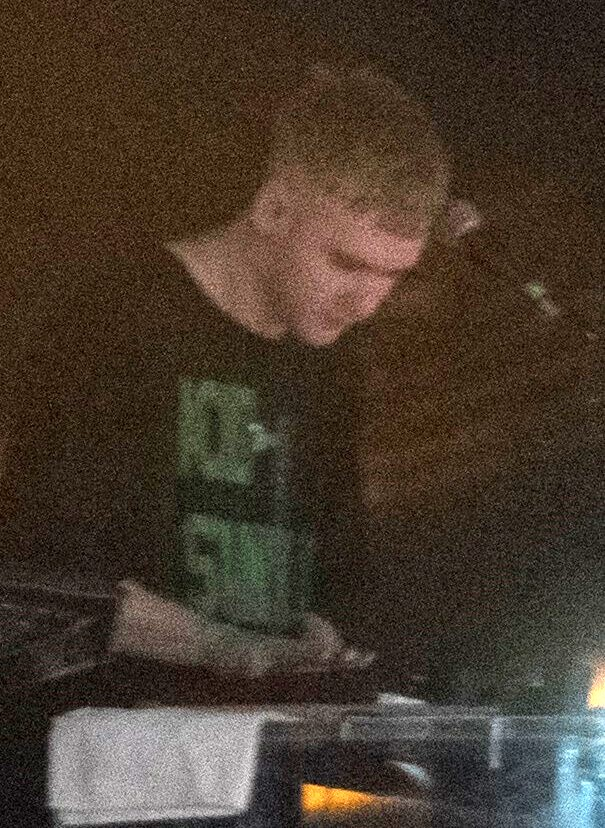
"Just for Me" was produced by British record producer Mura Masa.

"Just for Me" was inspired by the "stalkerish" theme of "Stan" by Eminem as well as PinkPantheress's desire to make a song that sounded like Craig David. After writing the melody of the song, she recorded it during a four-hour-long studio session with producer Mura Masa two weeks before the song's release. A snippet of "Just for Me" posted to TikTok in July 2021 by PinkPantheress went viral and was used in over two million videos on the platform as of October 2021. TikTok named "Just for Me" its "breakout track of the summer" and its third top song by a British artist in 2021.

"Just for Me" was released on 13 August 2021 through Parlophone and Elektra Records. The song was added to the BBC Radio 1 playlist in August 2021. British rapper Central Cee's song "Obsessed with You" heavily sampled "Just for Me". In October 2021, American singer Giveon performed an acoustic soul cover of the song for BBC Radio 1Xtra's Live Lounge. Later that month, British band Coldplay performed a slow piano-focused cover on BBC Radio 1's Live Lounge.

"Just for Me" is a "wistful", "funky", "2000s-inspired" bedroom pop, 2-step garage, and alternative pop song produced by British record producer Mura Masa, who also programmed and played drums and keyboards on the song. It runs for slightly less than two minutes. In it, PinkPantheress sings in a "soft", "android-like", "helium-high" tone, over a "snappy", "nostalgia-fueled" garage beat and "delicate", "gentle" guitars, about having an unhealthy obsession with a crush and going to lengths such as finding their house and sleeping with their hair under her pillow. She described the song as the spiritual successor to her song "Pain". NPR's Alex Ramos referred to the song as "uncanny, as are most stories about stalking and obsession". Chris Taylor of DIY wrote that the song was reminiscent of UK garage duo Artful Dodger, while Stereogum's Chris DeVille described it as "hyperpop-leaning".

== Critical reception and commercial performance ==
NPR named "Just for Me" one of the best songs released in August 2021, with writer Alex Ramos writing that "Just for Me" "demonstrates [PinkPantheress's] appeal" and "lingers under the radar", adding that "you won't even notice you've had it on repeat until the next time you're sucked in again". Jordan Darville of The Fader wrote that the song "transcends mere nostalgia thanks to a heap of emotion" and "has enough stomach butterflies to fill a monarch colony." In a review of To Hell with It, Stereogum's Chris DeVille called "Just for Me" his favorite PinkPantheress song as of writing the review, writing that it "most clearly affirms her potential to be a paradigm-shifting figure". Rob Copsey of Official Charts Company described "Just for Me" as PinkPantheress's "most radio-friendly offering yet" and praised it for its "high replayability", comparing it to "Do You Really Like It?" by garage group DJ Pied Piper and the Masters of Ceremonies.

"Just for Me" peaked at number 27 on the UK Singles Chart, making it her highest-charting single on the chart, and at number 49 on the Irish Singles Chart. "Just for Me" was named the best song of 2021 by The Fader. Dazed named it the fifth best song of the year, and it was also listed as one of the best songs of the year by Pitchfork, NME, NPR, Billboard, Uproxx, The Line of Best Fit, Nylon, Slant, and Crack.

== Music video ==
A music video for "Just for Me" was co-directed by PinkPantheress with Lauzza and uploaded to the YouTube channel "PP_ROCKSXX" on 9 September 2021. In it, she is shown standing in front of a DJ and performing the song in front of a white background to a crowd of depressed youths wearing emo-style clothing, with occasional fisheye lens cutaways. The video has a low display resolution and includes scenes with a tarantula, a book blowing in the wind, and people using flip phones. In the video, she also wears her hair in micro braids. DIY's Chris Taylor compared the video to "an early-00s Taking Back Sunday video", while Erica Russell of Paper stated that the video has "the stark, post-Y2K flair you might expect from a Cooler Kids or Anna Nalick video of the same era".

== Credits and personnel ==
Credits adapted from Tidal.

- PinkPantheress – vocals, songwriting
- Mura Masa – production, songwriting, drums, keyboards, engineering, programming
- Matt Colton – mastering
- Jonny Breakwell – mixing, engineering
- Dill – additional keyboards

== Charts ==
Chart performance for "Just for Me"
| Chart (2021) | Peak position |
|---|---|
| Ireland (IRMA) | 49 |
| New Zealand Hot Singles (RMNZ) | 5 |
| UK Singles (OCC) | 27 |

== Certifications ==
Certifications and sales for "Just for Me"
| Region | Certification | Certified units/sales |
|---|---|---|
| New Zealand (RMNZ) | Gold | 15,000^{‡} |
| United Kingdom (BPI) | Silver | 200,000^{‡} |
^{‡} Sales+streaming figures based on certification alone.

== Release history ==
Release history and formats for "Just for Me"
| Region | Date | Format | Label | Ref. |
|---|---|---|---|---|
| Various | 13 August 2021 | Digital download; streaming | Parlophone | |
| United Kingdom | 27 August 2021 | Contemporary hit radio | Parlophone | |
