= Sweet Female Attitude =

English electronic music act

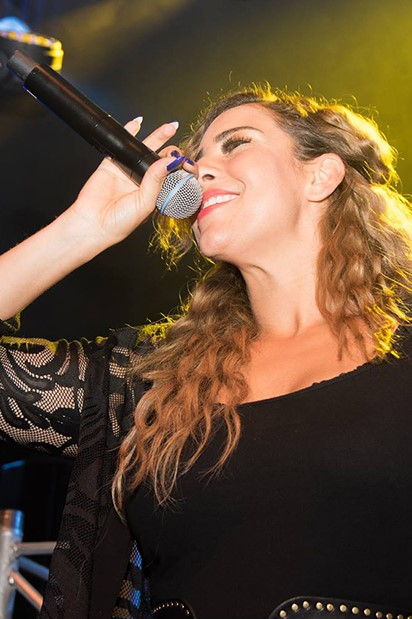
- Sweet Female Attitude performing at Cardiff University Students' Union in 2017

Background information
- Origin: Manchester, England
- Genres: UK garage; house; R&B
- Years active: 1996–present
- Labels: Milkk; Reverb XL; Staunch; In-CTRL; All Around the World
- Members: Leanne Brown
- Past members: Catherine Cassidy; Shine MC; Charlene Morrison; Sarah Bridgewood
- Website: leannebrownmusic.com

Sweet Female Attitude are an electronic music act from Manchester, England. They are known for the UK garage remix by Sunship of their track "Flowers", written by Martin Green a.k.a. Shine MC and Mike Powell, which reached number two on the UK Singles Chart in April 2000.

== Biography ==
Sweet Female Attitude began in 1996. Mike Powell, then manager/music producer and creator of the original name "Sweet Female Attitude" got together with DJ Shine MC and then 17-year-old singer Leanne Brown and began writing music together. Collectively, they developed a three-member group comprising Brown, Shine MC, and Charlene Morrison, then later Sarah Bridgewood joined. Bridgewood, Green and Morrison eventually left, leaving only Brown and new addition Catherine Cassidy.

== Discography ==
=== Album ===
- In Person (2001)

No.	Title	Length
1.	"Flowers"	3:50
2.	"8 Days a Week"	4:48
3.	"Don't Tell Me"	3:31
4.	"Rose"	3:54
5.	"Nothing to Lose"	3:20
6.	"Ready for Love"	4:06
7.	"DJ Play It"	5:09
8.	"Dreamin'"	3:29
9.	"Best Friend"	6:11
10.	"New Love"	3:40
11.	"8 Days a Week (Acoustic)"	3:10
12.	"Flowers (Cutfather & Joe Mix)"	3:58

=== Singles and EPs ===
- "Flowers" (2000) - UK #2, BPI: 2× platinum
- "8 Days a Week" (2000) - UK #43
- "DJ Play It" (2000)
- "Don't Tell Me" (2001)
- "Part of Me" (with BeeBar & Symphonik) (2016)
- "Never Kissed You" (with eSquire & Reload) (2017)
- "Give You My Devotion" (with Rio Dela Duna) (2017)
- "Never Had Love" (with Fake Remedy) (2017)
- "No Matter" (with the Peverell Bros) (2017)
- "Tell Me" (with ILL Phil) (2017)
- "Every Word" (with eSquire) (2017)
- "Connected" (2017)
- "Looking for Love" (2018)
- "Freak" (2018)
- "Give It to Me" (with Pagano & Reza) (2018)
- "Real Love" (2018)
- "One" (with Danny Blaze) (2018)
- Vibez EP (2018)
- Love, Life & Rhythm (2018)
- "Flowers" (with MEZIAH) (re-recording) (2023)
- "Teardrops" (2024)

=== Remixes ===
- "Flowers" – Jamie Duggan mix (2009)
- "Flowers" – 2015 mixes

No.	Title	Length
1.	"Flowers (Sam Divine & Curtis Gabriel mix)"	6:37
2.	"Flowers (Majestic & That Guy mix)"	3:58
3.	"Flowers (Freejack mix)"	4:49
4.	"Flowers (ANOTR mix)"	6:13
