= Colours (Adam F album) =

Studio album by Adam F
- Released: 3 November 1997
- Studios: Seventy Three; Orinoco Studios; Vons Studios; Aosis Studios; Swanyard Studios; Bible Studios
- Genre: Drum and bass
- Length: 62:10
- Labels: Positiva; F-Jams; Astralwerks
- Producer: Adam Fenton

Adam F chronology
Colours (1997)	Kaos: The Anti-Acoustic Warfare (2001)

Singles from Colours
- 1. "Circles" Released: 1995; 2. "Metropolis" / "Mother Earth" Released: 1996; 3. "F-Jam" Released: 18 November 1996; 4. "Music In My Mind" Released: 2 February 1998

Professional ratings
Review scores
Source	Rating
AllMusic	4.5/5 stars
NME	6/10 stars

Colours is the debut studio album by English drum and bass producer Adam F. It was released on 3 November 1997 through Positiva Records. The album features collaborations with Tracey Thorn (from Everything but the Girl), Grooverider, MC Conrad and Ronny Jordan. The first single from the album, "Circles", was initially released in 1995, but did not chart until its re-release in 1997, when it entered the UK Singles Chart and peaked at number 20. Other singles from the album included "Metropolis" / "Mother Earth", "F-Jam", and "Music In My Mind". Upon release, the album reached number 47 on the UK Albums Chart.

== Composition ==
The album comprises drum and bass music, taking inspiration from LTJ Bukem, Lalo Schifrin and Goldie's album Timeless. Adam Fenton (Adam F) produced the album with equipment including the Akai S1000, Yamaha SPX90, Kurzweil K2000, and the Atari 1040STE. The Roland VP-330 vocoder was additionally used for the vocals of "Music In My Mind".

English musician and album inspiration Goldie's voice appears briefly in the intro for "Mother Earth" in the form of a voice message sent to Adam F. "The Tree Knows Everything" features vocals from Tracey Thorn of Everything but the Girl, but was originally written as a guitar song by Fenton in his teenage years. "Circles" samples the opening of "Physical Thing" by Blackstreet, vocals from "Going in Circles" by Tameka Starr, and melody from "Westchester Lady" by Bob James. The title track, "Colours", features British acid jazz guitarist Ronny Jordan.

== Release ==
The album's first single, "Circles", was first released in 1995 through Section 5, but did not chart until its re-release in 1997 with remixes from Roni Size and Andy C. This release reached number 20 on the national UK Singles Chart, and number one on the UK Dance Chart. "Aromatherapy" was a single released in 1996, with a seven-minute edit included as a bonus track on most editions of the album. "Metropolis" / "Mother Earth" and "F-Jam" (featuring MC Conrad) were also released in 1996 as singles, with the latter reaching 100 on the UK Singles Chart and 18 on the Dance Chart. The final single, released after the album in 1998, was "Music In My Mind".

The album was released on 3 November 1997 and reached number 47 in the UK Albums Chart. It was released with differing covers: the vinyl version has a greyscale variant, the original CD and cassette versions have a blue cover, and other CD releases of the album have a cyan cover. Bonus tracks for the album included "Aromatherapy", "Circles" (Roni Size mix) and "Metropolis" (Doc Scott mix). "Colours" is omitted from the US release, both "Colours" and "The Tree Knows Everything" are omitted from the vinyl version.

== Track listing ==
CD and cassette
No.	Title	Writer(s)	Length
1.	"Intro"	Adam Fenton; Tim Philbert	1:03
2.	"73"	Fenton	1:28
3.	"Metropolis"	Fenton	6:31
4.	"Music In My Mind" (Album Version)	Fenton	5:18
5.	"Jaxx"	Fenton	5:08
6.	"Mother Earth"	Fenton	5:03
7.	"The Tree Knows Everything" (Clean Edit)	Fenton	4:27
8.	"Circles" (Album Edit)	Fenton; Bob James	7:14
9.	"Dirty Harry" (Adapted Album Version)	Fenton	6:49
10.	"F-Jam" (featuring MC Conrad)	Fenton	5:52
11.	"Colours" (featuring Ronny Jordan)	Fenton	5:37
Total length:			55:07

CD and cassette bonus track
No.	Title	Writer(s)	Length
12.	"Aromatherapy" (Edit)	Fenton	7:03
Total length:			62:10

US CD release
No.	Title	Writer(s)	Length
11.	"Aromatherapy" (Edit)	Fenton	7:03
12.	"Circles" (Roni Size Mix)	Fenton; James	7:14

Vinyl
No.	Title	Writer(s)	Length
1.	"Intro"	Fenton; Tim Philbert	1:03
2.	"73"	Fenton	1:28
3.	"Metropolis"	Fenton	6:31
4.	"Music In My Mind" (Album Version)	Fenton	5:18
5.	"Jaxx"	Fenton	5:08
6.	"Circles" (Album Edit)	Fenton; James	7:14
7.	"Mother Earth"	Fenton	5:03
8.	"Dirty Harry" (Adapted Album Version)	Fenton	6:49
9.	"F-Jam" (featuring MC Conrad)	Fenton	5:52
10.	"Metropolis" (Doc Scott Remix)	Fenton	8:05
11.	"Circles" (Roni Size Mix)	Fenton; Jordan	7:14
12.	"Aromatherapy" (Edit)	Fenton	7:03

Notes

- "The Tree Knows Everything" vocals by Tracey Thorn.
- "Dirty Harry" remix by Grooverider.

== Personnel ==
Adapted from liner notes

- Adam Fenton – writing, production, synthesisers, percussion, vocals, piano, keyboard, bass guitar
- Tracey Thorn – vocals on "The Tree Knows Everything"
- Bob James – writing (sampled) in "Circles"
- Grooverider – remix, additional production in "Dirty Harry"
- Ronny Jordan – guitar in "Colours"
- MC Conrad – vocals on "F-Jam"
- Goldie – answerphone vocals on "Mother Earth"
- Tim Philbert – writing, bass guitar
- Jeremy Stacey – drums
- Spry – percussion
- Pete Shrubshall – saxophone, flute
- Dave Ital - guitar
- Julian Joseph – electric piano
- Damon Brown – trumpet
- James McMillan – trumpet
- Ben Watt – additional production
- Grey Lester – guitar
- Andros – percussion
- Nick Cohen – bass guitar
- Nick Moss – saxophone

== Charts ==
Chart (1997)	Peak position
UK Albums (Official Charts Company)	47

== Release history ==
Region	Date	Format	Label	Cover colour	Ref.
UK and Europe	3 November 1997	Vinyl	Positiva Records; F-Jam	Grey	
UK and Europe	3 November 1997	CD; cassette	Positiva Records; F-Jam	Blue	
UK and Europe	3 November 1997	CD	Positiva Records; F-Jam	Cyan	
US	March 1998	CD	Astralwerks	Blue	
