= Adam F =

English record producer and DJ

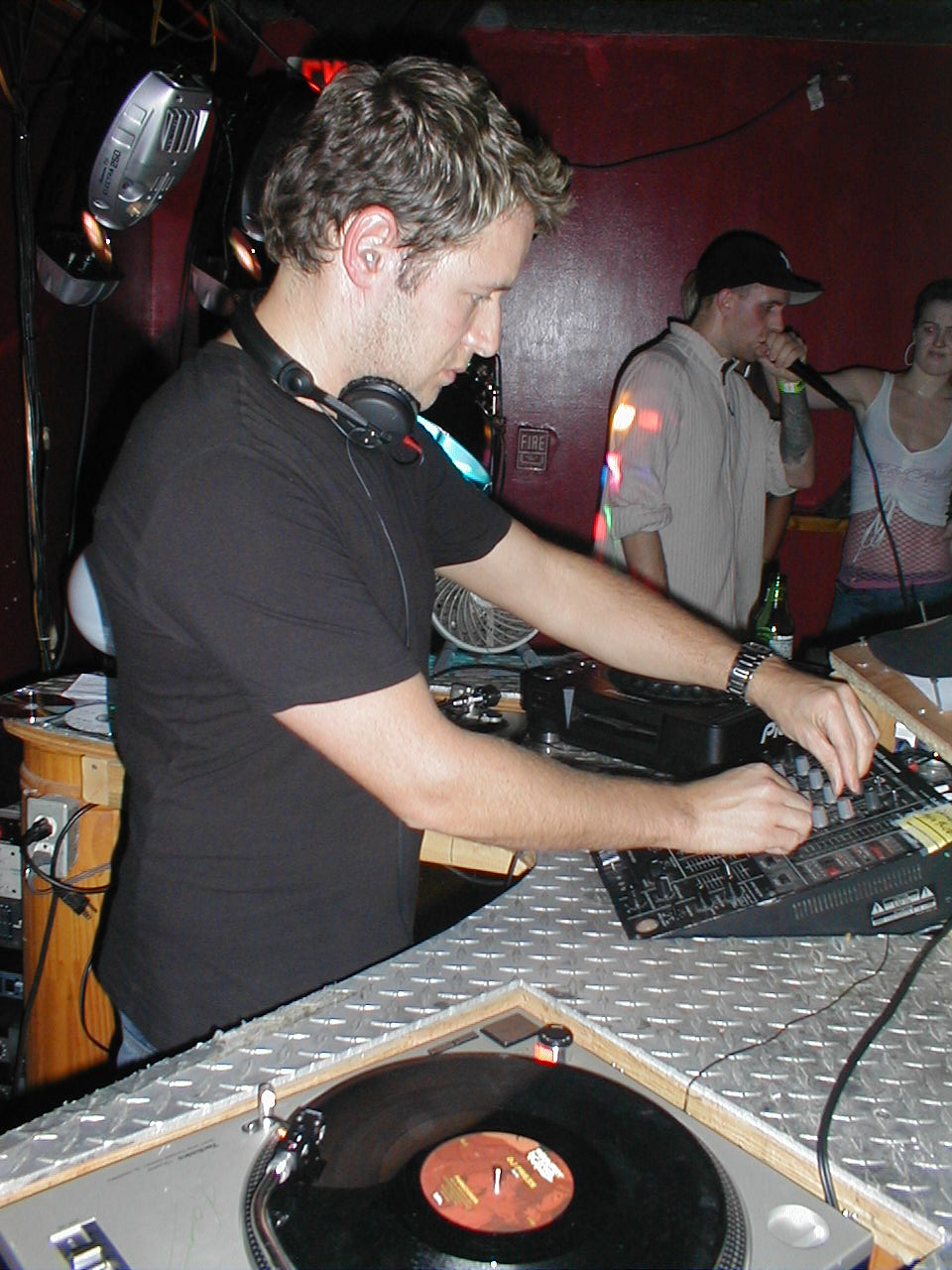
- Adam F performs at Listen at Club Alchemy in New Haven, Connecticut, on 3 September 2006.

Background information
- Born: Adam Fenton; 8 February 1972 (age 54); Liverpool, England
- Genres: Electronic; drum and bass; hip hop; big beat
- Occupations: Record producer; DJ
- Labels: Section 5; Metalheadz; V Recordings; Breakbeat Kaos; Astralwerks; EMI
- Formerly of: Metalheadz

Adam Fenton (born 8 February 1972), also known as Adam F, is an English record producer and DJ who has worked across various genres. He is also the co-founder of the drum and bass label Breakbeat Kaos along with DJ Fresh. He found initial success with the 1990s drum and bass singles "Circles", "Metropolis", and "F-Jam", before releasing his debut studio album Colours in 1997. In 2001, he transitioned into hip hop music, producing the album Kaos: The Anti-Acoustic Warfare, featuring collaborations with LL Cool J, Redman and De La Soul. He later released a remix album, Drum and Bass Warfare, and collaborated with DJ Fresh.

== Career ==
Adam began his career with the Bob James-sampling "Circles" in 1995. Its re-release in 1997 made Top 20 in the UK Singles Chart. This was followed with "Metropolis/Mother Earth" in 1996 on the Metalheadz record label. His other early successes were the tracks "F-Jam" and "Music In My Mind". In 1998 he won a MOBO award for his debut 1997 album, Colours. This was followed by another single "Brand New Funk", released 1998 on V Recordings.

In 2001, he found success in the field of hip hop, primarily with Kaos: The Anti-Acoustic Warfare, working alongside artists such as LL Cool J, Redman and De La Soul. In 2002, Adam created the score for the feature film Ali G Indahouse starring Sacha Baron Cohen for Working Title Films.

He is founder and co-owner of the UK independent record label Breakbeat Kaos, which released Pendulum's album Hold Your Colour; he is also co-owner of the drum and bass website Dogs on Acid.

In early 2007 he was cast in his first film role, the crime thriller The Heavy. In December 2007, Adam also co-starred in Cuckoo, a thriller about sound and lies, co-starring Richard E. Grant and Laura Fraser, directed by Richard Bracewell.

2009 saw Adam back in the studio, this time with Horx to remix The Prodigy's "Take Me to the Hospital" from their album Invaders Must Die. Months later, Adam collaborated with Horx again to release "Shut The Lights Off" with Redman. Adam F and DJ Fresh's 2010 collaboration single under the artist name WTF?! was next, built around Dead Prez's "Hip Hop". Over the past few years Adam has remixed David Guetta, Rihanna, Afrojack, Missy Elliott, Sander van Doorn and Scrufizzer.

Returning to the studio in recent years, Adam's "In The Air" collaboration with Sonic C was released as a free download and supported by Annie Mac, MistaJam, Zinc, A-Trak and Zeds Dead. It set the scene for "When The Rain Is Gone", Adam's first official single release under his own name for some time. The single was released in 2012 on 3Beat.

Adam later released his Elements EP on Breakbeat Kaos. It included the tracks "Elements", "When The Rain Is Gone", "In The Air", "It's Bigger Than Hip Hop UK" and his remixes of Afrojack's "Take Over Control" and Sander van Doorn's "Nothing Inside".

Adam's most recent output was in the form of "See You Again", a collaboration with DJ Fresh featuring Michael Warren which was on Fresh's album Nextlevelism. He has also recently collaborated with British electronic music producer Doctor P and Method Man, who is also known for his collaborations with Redman, to produce the late-2013 track "The Pit".

== Personal life ==
Adam comes from a musical family. He is the son of singer and actor Alvin Stardust and the nephew of Rory Storm, whose band Rory Storm and the Hurricanes once included Ringo Starr before he joined the Beatles.

He is married to Kirsty Hawkshaw, a member of group Opus III.

Storm was friends with Bill Shankly, which played a part in Adam becoming a lifelong Liverpool F.C. fan.

== Discography ==
=== Studio albums ===
- Colours (1997)
- Kaos: The Anti-Acoustic Warfare (2001)

=== Remix albums ===
- Drum and Bass Warfare (2002)

=== Film scores ===
- Ali G Indahouse (2002), Working Title Films and Universal Pictures

=== Singles and EPs ===
- "Circles" (1995), Section 5
- "Before Today" (1996), Virgin – Remix of Everything But the Girl
- "Aromatherapy" (1996), Section 5
- "Metropolis" & "Mother Earth" (1996), Metalheadz
- "Telling Lies" (1997), BMG/Arista – Mix of David Bowie
- "F-Jam" (1997), F-Jams – Featuring MC Conrad, UK No. 122
- "Circles" (1997), F-Jams – UK No. 20
- "Brand New Funk" (1998), V Recordings
- "Music in My Mind" (1998), F-Jams – UK No. 27
- "Stand Clear" (2001), EMI – Featuring M.O.P., UK No. 43
- "Where's My..?" (2002), EMI – Featuring Lil' Mo, UK No. 37
- "Metrosound" (2002), Kaos – With J Majik, UK No. 54
- "Stand Clear" (2002), Kaos – Remix featuring M.O.P., UK No. 50
- "Smash Sumthin'" (2002), Kaos – Featuring Redman, UK No. 11
- "Dirty Harry's Revenge" (2002), Kaos – Featuring Beenie Man, UK No. 50
- "Eightball" & "Original Junglesound" (2005), Breakbeat Kaos – UK No. 93
- "Take Me to the Hospital" (2009), XL Recordings – Remix with Horx of The Prodigy
- "Shut the Lights Off!" (2009), Breakbeat Kaos – with Horx featuring Redman
- "When the Rain Is Gone" (2012), 3Beat
- Elements (2012), Breakbeat Kaos
- "The Pit" (2013), Circus – With Doctor P featuring Method Man
- "Believer" (2015), Ministry of Sound – With DJ Fresh, UK No. 58
- "Harmony" (2016), Sony Music Entertainment – With Kokiri featuring Rae

=== Featured artists ===
- "When the Sun Goes Down" (with DJ Fresh) (2005) UK No. 69
- "See You Again" (with DJ Fresh featuring Michael Warren) (2012)
