= O.K. (Kool A.D. album) =

Mixtape by Kool A.D.
- Released: November 26, 2015
- Recorded: Oakland, California
- Genres: Hip-hop, alternative hip-hop
- Length: 6 hours 38 minutes

Kool A.D. chronology
Word O.K. (2014)	O.K. (2015)

O.K. is a mixtape by Kool A.D., released November 26, 2015. The album features guest appearances from Killer Mike, Shady Blaze, Angel Haze, Lakutis, Despot, Chairlift, Toro Y Moi, Talib Kweli, Boots Riley of The Coup, and Mr. Muthafuckin' eXquire and is composed of 100 songs, meant as a "spiritual soundtrack" to his upcoming 100-chapter novel, also titled O.K.

== Critical reception ==
Upon release, the album was described by The Fader as Kool A.D.'s "most ambitious musical project yet," and Okayplayer called it "a blistering and damn impressive piece of work".

== Track listing ==
No.	Title	Producer(s)	Length
1.	"Hello"	Kool A.D.	3:49
2.	"O.K."	Keyboard Kid	4:49
3.	"Santeria"	Toro y Moi	5:11
4.	"No Parezco a Nadie" (feat. Mellow Man Ace)	Amaze 88	3:21
5.	"Games"	Toro y Moi	2:22
6.	"Game" (feat. Shady Blaze)	Issue	3:54
7.	"LSD"	Audio Narcos	3:46
8.	"Zen Zen Zen Zen Zen"	Chase n Cashe	1:34
9.	"Huez uv Lite" (feat. Plinio)	Plinio	3:10
10.	"2 Much"	Issue	4:01
11.	"Faneto Freestyle" (feat. Polo)	Chief Keef	6:38
12.	"BWOY" (feat. Epic)	Amaze 88	9:30
13.	"Chuy Gomez" (feat. Chaz Van Queen & Raheem Recess)	Amaze 88	9:30
14.	"Trouble Nap"	Kool A.D.	0:58
15.	"Hot Tub Rhyme Machine"	Dame Grease	9:44
16.	"Knowledge Equality"	Kool A.D.	3:57
17.	"#BlackBrunch" (feat. Amaze 88, Kassa Overall, & Chaz Van Queen)	Posse Cuts Anonymous	5:28
18.	"Up Down Freestyle"	DJ Mustard	3:53
19.	"Faith Healing" (feat. Amaze 88)	Amaze 88	4:11
20.	"Jazzz" (feat. KBob, Kassa Overall, Loren Hell, Aaron Cohen, & Chaz Van Queen)	Posse Cuts Anonymous	10:20
21.	"U Like Dat" (feat. Amaze 88)	Amaze 88	3:52
22.	"Swoop Swoop"	Young Mozart	1:48
23.	"Women B Shoppin"	Kool A.D.	0:59
24.	"4:50 AM" (feat. Chaz Van Queen, Kassa Overall, Amaze 88, & Aaron Cohen)	Posse Cuts Anonymous	8:42
25.	"Zup"	Amaze 88	3:46
26.	"Pretty Bodies Fly" (feat. YC the Cynic & Lakutis)	Steel Tipped Dove	3:52
27.	"So What" (feat. Raheem Recess)	Pierre Pharaoh	4:06
28.	"Hood Party" (feat. Fat Tony & Despot)	Tom Cruz	4:03
29.	"Shotcaller Freestyle"	Harry Fraud	3:00
30.	"Slack" (feat. Cult Days)	Kool A.D.	1:31
31.	"Rap Olympics"	Mike Finito	2:05
32.	"Future Primitive Art School" (feat. Big Baby Gandhi)	Hot 97	3:48
33.	"Rapturez Deelite"	Kool A.D.	8:45
34.	"Bullshit" (feat. New Earth Creeps)	New Earth Creeps	2:12
35.	"Jungle Fever Remix" (feat. Angel Haze)	J-La	4:18
36.	"Bohemian Grove Zeemix"	Boy Crisis LLC	5:28
37.	"Writing Leverage" (feat. Fat Tony, Lakutis, & Nasty Nigel)	Hot Sugar	4:39
38.	"This Girl is Rich" (feat. Trackademicks & 1-O.A.K.)	Trackademicks	4:28
39.	"I Don't Want to be a Player No More"	Kool A.D.	1:29
40.	"Jackson Pollock" (feat. Maffew Ragazino)	Harry Fraud	3:49
41.	"Life of Pi" (feat. Raw Don, Mr. Muthafuckin' eXquire, & Michael Christmas)	Constrobuz	7:41
42.	"Thought So"	Too Shirts	1:19
43.	"Zonin" (feat. Issue)	Keyboard Kid	4:55
44.	"1989 World Series Freestyle"	Bear Hands; O.G. Van Boys	2:27
45.	"Holy Sound" (feat. King Sterlz & DJ MilkCrates)	DJ Detonate	3:54
46.	"Pain Killers" (feat. Little Pain, Lofty 305, Wiki, & Antwon)	Michael Uzowuru	5:19
47.	"2 Late" (feat. Toro y Moi & Sage)	Toro y Moi	3:44
48.	"We Know" (feat. Niko Is)	Thanks Joey	5:20
49.	"Nothing" (feat. Kassa Overall)	Keyboard Kid	4:04
50.	"Go Supersonics"	Kool A.D.	1:16
51.	"V.I.P." (feat. Killer Mike & Boots Riley)	The Coup	2:18
52.	"A Ganglion of Lightnings Dancehall Treemix" (feat. Ra Sekem)	Boys Crisis LLC	3:26
53.	"This Bitter Earth"	Shaleik	3:24
54.	"The Pain"	Kool A.D.	2:06
55.	"Break Spinal" (feat. Well$ & Ness)	Weekend Money	3:10
56.	"Anything" (feat. Bill Ding, Kechphrase, Fat Tony, Big Baby Gandhi, Epic, & Tre DeJean)	Kechphrase	5:31
57.	"Phony Rappers" (feat. Lakutis)	Steel Tipped Dove	3:05
58.	"Future Primitive Acupuncture Apprenticeship" (feat. Johnny Voltik)	Johnny Voltik	3:10
59.	"These Dayz" (feat. Cavalier & Safe)	Scott Thorough	4:24
60.	"Bang Bang"	DJ Sicksentz; CNN	3:56
61.	"You Can't Win" (feat. Party Animal)	Party Animal	0:47
62.	"I Guess I'm Dum But I Don't Care"	Kool A.D.	1:20
63.	"Dangereaux"	The Shoes	5:12
64.	"O Yea"	Kool A.D.	1:00
65.	"Prove It"	Scoop DeVille	4:20
66.	"Cheap Joy"	Kool A.D.	1:39
67.	"Guest List" (feat. Dena)	Dena	3:54
68.	"Youth Speaks" (feat. Loren Hell & Amaze 88)	Amaze 88	4:09
69.	"Free Palestine"	Toro y Moi	3:04
70.	"Warhol's Wig" (feat. Creature)	Preservation	4:01
71.	"Wassup" (feat. Raheem Recess)	Amazing SB	4:29
72.	"Pop Ur Bubble" (feat. Beans & Sub Con)	Knifefight	2:50
73.	"Daytona 900" (feat. Big Baby Gandhi, Chaz Van Queen, Kassa Overall, Tecla, Lakutis, Davito, DVS & Iron Solomon)	N/A	9:10
74.	"Classic Man" (feat. Safe)	Roman GianArthur	3:43
75.	"Hypersensitive Jester" (feat. Bill Ding)	Steel Tipped Dove	3:57
76.	"Look at the Waves in Ur Hair" (feat. Lakutis & Ease Da Man)	Steel Tipped Dove	3:14
77.	"Falcon Punch" (feat. Chavis Chandler)	Prime Conductor	2:02
78.	"Swan Gang Genesis Lost Tapes Who Cares Swag Swag" (feat. Chaz Van Queen, Lakutis, & DVS)	Chaz Van Queen; Big Baby Gandhi	4:14
79.	"B Alikes" (feat. Chaz Van Queen)	N/A	2:51
80.	"Do U Like It" (feat. Chaz Van Queen)	Chaz Van Queen	4:31
81.	"Quit Ur Bitchin" (feat. Booys Riley & New Earth Creeps)	New Earth Creeps	2:02
82.	"World Life Reality Peace God Immaculate"	Amaze 88	3:50
83.	"Pacific Skreet Freestyle"	Amaze 88	1:59
84.	"Sonic Reducer"	Keyboard Kid	4:05
85.	"2 Rax Freeskyle"	Too Shirts	2:52
86.	"Brobamian Algorithm"	Kechphrase	2:13
87.	"Prison Reform"	Gonjasufi I Think	3:18
88.	"Freakin Out"	Amaze 88	4:39
89.	"Real Love" (feat. Cult Days)	Ghostda	2:07
90.	"Good Old Neon Too"	Kool A.D.	1:29
91.	"The Actual" (feat. Talib Kweli)	Amaze 88	3:59
92.	"Pacific Ocean"	Kool A.D.	3:35
93.	"Alice Coltrane Freestyle"	Kool A.D.	6:41
94.	"Testify" (feat. Haleek Maul & Shady Blaze)	Haleek Maul	3:55
95.	"Reggae Shmop"	Trackademicks	3:37
96.	"Time uv Ur Lyfe" (feat. Issue)	Amaze 88	2:35
97.	"Maestro"	Amaze 88	3:50
98.	"Or a Ladder That's Forever"	Kool A.D.	11:09
99.	"Dum Diary"	Amaze 88	8:31
100.	"Bye Bye"	Kool A.D.	3:33
