= Friendzone (duo) =

American instrumental hip-hop duo

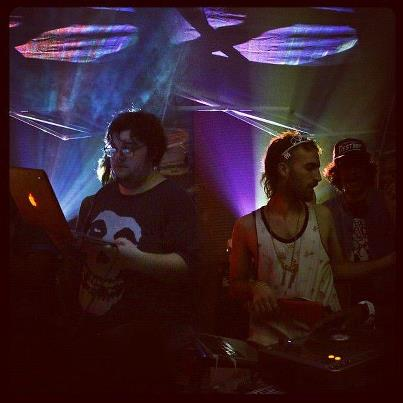
- Laurence (left) and Reznick performing in 2012

Background information
- Origin: East Bay, California, U.S.
- Genres: Alternative hip-hop; cloud rap; chillwave
- Years active: 2010–2017
- Past members: Dylan Reznick; James Laurence
- Website: friendzone.bandcamp.com

Friendzone (stylized FRIENDZONE) was an American hip-hop producer duo based in the East Bay of California, consisting of producers James Laurence and Dylan Reznick. On January 30, 2017, it was announced that Laurence had died at the age of 27 from undisclosed circumstances.

== History ==
Friendzone produced Main Attrakionz' "Chuch" and "Perfect Skies", which were featured on the 2011 mixtape 808s & Dark Grapes II. In 2012, the duo released Collection I, a compilation of rap instrumentals and original songs.

In 2013, Friendzone landed their first major label placement, producing the song "Fashion Killa" for ASAP Rocky, which appeared on his debut album Long. Live. ASAP, and also released the compilation Kuchibiru Network 3, which included contributions by several notable producers including Ryan Hemsworth, Skywlkr, DJ Kenn, and Jerome LOL. That same year, the duo produced Yung Lean's "Solarflare", the final track of his debut mixtape Unknown Death 2002.

On October 9, 2013, Friendzone released their debut album, DX. Vice premiered the music video for "Poly" on the same day.

On February 16, 2015, Boiler Room released Upfront 014, which featured nearly an hour of unreleased music from the duo. On May 27, Friendzone released a new EP, While U Wait. Main Attrakionz released 808s & Dark Grapes III, produced by Friendzone in its entirety, on Neil Young's Vapor Records on June 30, 2015.

On January 30, 2017, James Laurence was reported dead at the age of 27. The cause and date of death were not announced. On February 6, Dylan Reznick shared a previously unreleased track, "Sweet Dream", as a tribute to Laurence. The duo had finished the song a few weeks prior to Laurence's death.

== Discography ==
=== Albums ===
- DX (2013)

=== Mixtapes ===
- Get Back (2011)
- My Wishlist (2011)
- Kuchibiru Network (2011)
- Kuchibiru Network 2 (2011)
- Rose Quartz Mix (2012)
- Collection I (2012)
- Champion Sound #11 (2013)
- Kuchibiru Network 3 (2013)
- The DX Mix (2013)
- Upfront 014 (2015)
- Collection II (2022)
- Collection III (2023)

=== EPs ===
- While U Wait (2015)

=== Singles ===
- "A.L.L." / "JD" (2010)
- "No One" (2011)
- "I Have Nothing" (2012)
- "!!-Major" (2012)
- "Retailxtal" (2012)
- "Rest" (2012)
- "Moments Pt. 1" (2012)
- "Moments Pt. 2" (2013)
- "First Love XOXO" (2013)
- "Always" (2013)
- "4 Yia Yia" (2013)
- "Who Wanna Rumble" (2013) (featuring Mykki Blanco)
- "Poly" / "8AM" (2013)
- "Appropriate X" / "Blast Furnace" (2014)
- "Needs5" (2014)
- "TCShe" (2015) (featuring Sheera)
- "Sweet Dream" (2017)

=== Guest appearances ===
- L.W.H. - "All in Your Hands" from The Tape Hiss Hooligan (2011)
- Gummybear - "Can't Go Wrong" from Time (2011)
- L.W.H. - "Medus6sa" from CIA TV (2012)

=== Productions ===
- Freddy Rupert – "Why Don't You Love Me" (2010)
- Squadda B - "I Miss Y'all" / "Focus" (2011)
- Shady Blaze - "Follow Me" (2011)
- Main Attrakionz - "Chuch" and "Perfect Skies" from 808s & Dark Grapes II (2011)
- Carios + DKXO - "From Dusk Till Dawn" (2011)
- Main Attrakionz - "Women We Chase" (2012)
- Main Attrakionz x Shady Blaze - "Green Ova to the Top" (2012)
- Lo-Fi-Fnk - "Taking U for Granted" from Maxade Mixtape Vol. 1 (2012)
- Chippy Nonstop - "Chippy's Theme" (2012)
- Pepperboy - "Real" from Days of Grace (2012)
- Main Attrakionz - "Love U" from Tag Champz Bundle (2012)
- Squadda B - "Cheater" from Northside Bad Guy (2012)
- Main Attrakionz - "Zombies on the Turf Pt. 2" (2012)
- Deniro Farrar & Shady Blaze - "All the Way" and "Back/Forth/Back" from Kill or Be Killed (2012)
- Main Attrakionz - "Rap Paradise" (2012)
- ASAP Rocky - "Fashion Killa" from Long. Live. ASAP (2013)
- Deniro Farrar - "Back/Forth/Back" from The Patriarch (2013)
- Mondre M.A.N. - "Where She At" and "Have Faith" from Cloudd Packk (2013)
- Squadda B - "Ridin Dirty Past 50" from Streets Killed Us (2013)
- Squadda B - "Slippin, Kant Get Up" from Triple F.A.T. Goose (2013)
- Antwon - "Automatic" (2013)
- Shady Blaze - "Fucked Up" and "Wake 'Em Up" from The 5th Chapter (2013)
- Nature Boys - "Mansions" (2013)
- Yung Lean - "Solarflare" from Unknown Death 2002 (2013)
- Glasspopcorn - "Nightingale" from Don't Worry (2013)
- Main Attrakionz - "About to Leave" from Best Duo Ever: The Bricktape (2013)
- Tynethys - "TFZ" from Thyluxe (2014)
- Eddington Again - "Lyft" from Masturgrape (2015)
- Main Attrakionz - 808s & Dark Grapes III (2015)

=== Remixes ===
- Former Ghosts - "Chin Up (Friendzone Remix)" (2011)
- Lo-Fi-Fnk - "Shut the World Out (Friendzone Remix)" (2012)
- States of Emotion - "The Way That I'm Wired (Friendzone Remix)" from The Way That I'm Wired (2014)
