= Zachg =

American rapper

- Also known as: Hemol; Zach G; Zach Moldof
- Born: Zachary Granger Moldof; July 22, 1981 (age 45); Broward County, Florida, U.S.
- Origin: Los Angeles, California, U.S.
- Genres: Alternative hip hop
- Occupations: Rapper; producer
- Instrument: Sampler
- Years active: 2000–present
- Label: Rad Reef
- Website: zachg.bandcamp.com

Zachary Granger Moldof (born July 22, 1981), better known by his stage name Zachg, is an American hip hop artist who is based in Los Angeles, California. He is a founder of the lifestyle collective Rad Reef, which released the New No Wave compilation in 2013. He is one half of the design duo Twin Beast. He has collaborated with Main Attrakionz, Jel, Silky Johnson, Black Noise, BK Beats, Left Leberra, and Dizzy D, among others.

== Life and career ==
Zachg, who is Jewish, is originally from Broward County, Florida and grew up in Windmill Ranch Estates in Weston, Florida. He attended University of Central Florida for advertising. He examined the roots of sampling in hip hop with his master's thesis at New York University Tisch School of the Arts.

Zachg was featured on "Hyperbolic Chamber Music", a 22-minute track produced by Ryan Hemsworth, along with other rappers such as Kool A.D., Lakutis, Isaiah Toothtaker, and Shady Blaze. He was also featured on "Hyperbolic Chamber Music II", which was produced by Steel Tipped Dove.

In 2012, Zachg released Cloudlife, a collaborative EP with Main Attrakionz and Jel. It was described by Fact as "an unusually focused release" from Main Attrakionz. He produced "J Bar" and "Take Her Shoppin" off of the EP. In that year, he also released Raindancin (in the Pussy), as well as Mostly Power and Mostly Peace.

== Discography ==
=== Studio albums ===
- South Florida Mountains (2014)
- Errlirl (2016)
- Whole Tushie (2016)

=== Mixtapes ===
- Rara Aves (2011)
- Sonter Masic (2012)
- Peace Mettle (2012)
- Raindancin (in the Pussy) (2012)
- New World Whale (2012)
- Bright Side of the Moon (2013)

=== EPs ===
- All Fucked Up Everything (2011)
- Prostitutes' Yard Sale (2011) (with Silky Johnson)
- Smuggler Songgs (2011) (with Western Tink)
- PMB Ho! (2012) (with Black Noise)
- Carbon Bros (2012) (with BK Beats)
- Hashburry Gardens (2012) (with Left Leberra)
- Cloudlife (2012) (with Main Attrakionz and Jel)
- Cool Cool Summer (2012) (with Freshgalaxy)
- Adominable Flowmans (2012) (with Dizzy D)
- Fates' Book (2012)
- Sky Pants (2012) (with Deli Mane)
- All Fucked Up Everything Vol. 2 (2012)
- Mostly Power (2012)
- Mostly Peace (2012)
- Mindcrate #1: Tropical Unnerpant (2013)
- Swiss Zachary Robinson (2014)

=== Singles ===
- "Leftover Karma" (2011)
- "Deep Nile" (2011)
- "Ghost Pussy Money" (2012)
- "Freeda Peeple's Anthem" (2013)

=== Guest appearances ===
- Mishka & Rad Reef – "Hyperbolic Chamber Music" (2012)
- Droned Out Clone – "Desperate Time Shit" from Instrumental Institution Vol. 1 (2012)
- Sortahuman x Dizzy D – "Outerspace" from Animal House (2012)
- Freshgalaxy – "Californeattle" from World of Summer 2 (2012)
- Western Tink – "Welcome to Cap City" (2013)
- Noah23 – "Leopard Carpet" from Lotus Deities (2013)
- Mishka & Rad Reef – "Hyperbolic Chamber Music II" (2013)
- Noah23 – "Weight Up" from Street Astrology (2014)

=== Productions ===
- Sortahuman – "How You Really Feel" from Stonergang (2011)
- Lofty305 – "Haunted Clothes", "Heart and Mind", "Castle in the Clouds", and "Styrofoam" from Haunted Clothes (2011)
- Left Leberra – "Ripd Dresses" from Bubble Quiet Dos Mil (2011)
- Noah23 – "Leopard Carpet" from Lotus Deities (2013)
- Noah23 – "Weight Up" from Street Astrology (2014)

=== Compilation appearances ===
- "Floridian Rapper. Mountain 5." on New No Wave (2013)
- "Chronoglades" on Mitsuda (2013)
