= The Palm Wine Drinkard (album) =

Mixtape by Kool A.D.
- Released: January 3, 2012
- Genres: Hip-hop, alternative hip-hop, R&B
- Length: 41:04
- Label: Greedhead

Kool A.D. chronology
| The Palm Wine Drinkard (2012) | 51 (2012) |

Professional ratings
Review scores
| Source | Rating |
|---|---|
| Pitchfork | (6.2/10) |
| PopMatters | (6/10) |

The Palm Wine Drinkard is the first solo mixtape by rapper Kool A.D., of the rap group Das Racist. Released in January 2012, it is the first of two mixtapes released by Kool A.D. that year, with 51 following in April. The mixtape takes its name from Amos Tutuola's novel The Palm-Wine Drinkard.

== Content ==
The title track of the mixtape features the full sample of OutKast's seven-minute song "SpottieOttieDopaliscious," from their 1998 album Aquemini Two of the songs on the album, "Booty in the Air" and "You Can Sell Anything," are remixed versions of pre-existing Das Racist songs, from the albums Relax and Sit Down, Man, respectively. The track "A Ganglion of Lightnings" is a re-recorded version of a song by Kool A.D.'s previous band, Boy Crisis.

== Reception ==
The Palm Wine Drinkard received mixed to positive reviews from music critics. Pitchfork's Zach Kelly gave the mixtape a 6.2/10 rating, stating, "when A.D. really stretches himself, some of the most bizarre ideas turn into something interesting." Giving the album a 6/10 score, Adam Finley of PopMatters declared the mixtape "a messy mix of goofy ideas slammed together by a guy as seemingly interested in entertaining himself as he is in making consumable art," but adding, "what he does do well is surprise and entertain, building the recognizable form of an album out of disparate pieces."

== Track listing ==
| No. | Title | Length |
|---|---|---|
| 1. | "The Palm Wine Drinkard" | 7:09 |
| 2. | "Lagrimas Blancas" | 3:04 |
| 3. | "Titties Out" | 4:28 |
| 4. | "Booty in the Air (2009 DJ Prick Nasty Exclusive)" | 2:34 |
| 5. | "A Ganglion of Lightnings" | 3:36 |
| 6. | "Girls and Women" | 3:43 |
| 7. | "Fun" | 5:41 |
| 8. | "Flying Thru the Air Inna Airplane" | 1:22 |
| 9. | "Antenna Man's Theme" | 5:24 |
| 10. | "You Can Sell Anything (Mega Dance Premix)" | 4:10 |
