= 51 (mixtape) =

Mixtape by Kool A.D.
- Released: April 24, 2012
- Recorded: Oakland, California
- Genres: Hip-hop; alternative hip-hop
- Length: 59:07
- Labels: Greedhead; Mishka; Veehead
- Producers: Kool A.D.; Amaze 88; Trackademicks; KechPhrase; Young L; Mike Finito

Kool A.D. chronology
The Palm Wine Drinkard (2012)	51 (2012)	63 and 19 (2013)

Professional ratings
Review scores
Source	Rating
Robert Christgau	B+
Consequence of Sound	3/5 stars
Pitchfork	7.9/10
Prefix Magazine	8.0/10
Rolling Stone	3/5 stars

51 is the second solo mixtape by American rapper Kool A.D., formerly of the rap group Das Racist. The mixtape, released in April 2012, is a follow-up to Kool A.D.'s debut solo mixtape, The Palm Wine Drinkard, which was released in January 2012.

== Recording ==
Unlike previous Das Racist efforts, Kool A.D. recorded 51 in Oakland, California, which resulted in a more confident sound according to many critics. A.D. recruited many Bay Area producers and rappers to assist him with the creation of the mixtape, though fellow New York-based Das Racist member Heems appears on one track.

== Content ==
A variety of references are made throughout the lyrics of 51. Kool A.D. disparagingly references the feud between Drake and Common by commenting, "Who cares?" on the track "La Pinata." Other references in the mixtape include boxer Manny Pacquiao, artist Damien Hirst, musician Al Green, and Lady Gaga's song "Poker Face." The tracks "Oooh" and "No" sample Marvin Gaye.

== Reception ==
51 received mostly positive reviews from critics. Many compared the album positively to Kool A.D.'s less well-received previous effort, The Palm Wine Drinkard. Pitchfork applauded the fact that "Kool A.D. is actually rapping for the most part on this one rather than further pursuing the robo-tripping path of Palm Wine Drinkard," noting that 51 is "the most consistently listenable thing out of the Greedhead camp since Sit Down, Man probably because it's the most effortlessly fun since Shut Up, Dude." In a positive review, Prefix Magazine described the mixtape as "a damn fine mixtape—album, release, whatever. It’s a trip down into Kool A.D.’s psyche, a demonstrable showing that while Das Racist might be based in New York, one of their members is spiritually Bay." Rolling Stone's Matthew Trammell, in a mixed review, wrote that "the project veers off course when A.D. taps Bay Area-beatmaker Young L, and derails entirely (and possibly intentionally) when the rapper steps behind the boards for songs like the grinding, non-sensical 'Power/Refinement Knowledge,'" though Trammell noted that the mixtape as a whole "suggest[s] that Kool A.D should record in the Bay Area more often."

== Track listing ==
No.	Title	Producer	Length
1.	"51"	Amaze 88	4:52
2.	"Electrum"	Illingsworth	1:25
3.	"La Pinata"	Amaze 88	2:15
4.	"Oooh" (featuring Main Attrakionz)	Amaze 88	4:03
5.	"Arrested Development" (featuring Kassa Overall)	Kechphrase	3:41
6.	"Ticky Tacky" (featuring Main Attrakionz and Green Ova)	Young L	2:50
7.	"Manny Pacquiao"	Trackademicks	3:47
8.	"California Music Channel" (featuring Trackademicks)	Trackademicks	3:12
9.	"Power / Refinement Knowledge"	Kool A.D.	1:56
10.	"Donda"	Amaze 88	1:08
11.	"Biz vs. Nuge"		0:24
12.	"Damien Hirst" (feat. Mondre M.A.N. and Dope G)	Young L	4:05
13.	"Town Business" (feat. Mondre M.A.N., Trackademicks and Dope G)	Trackademicks	3:40
14.	"Leverage" (featuring Boots Riley)	Amaze 88	1:50
15.	"Gentry"	Kool A.D.	2:37
16.	"TV Eye"	Amaze 88	2:55
17.	"No"	Amaze 88	3:17
18.	"The Robbery"	Amaze 88	1:56
19.	"A Milli"	Kool A.D.	1:23
20.	"A Different World" (featuring Meyhem Lauren and Heems)	Mike Finito	3:09
21.	"Al Green"	Kool A.D.; Daniel Lynas	2:41
22.	"Island High Cypher"	Amaze 88	2:12
