= 63/19 =

Mixtape by Kool A.D.
- Released: February 7, 2013
- Recorded: Oakland, California
- Genres: Hip-hop, alternative hip-hop

Kool A.D. chronology
51 (2012)	63/19 (2013)	Not O.K. (2013)

63 and 19 are mixtapes by Kool A.D, released as a double-album on February 7, 2013. The albums include collaborations with Pictureplane, Young L, SKYWLKR, Keyboard Kid, Trackademicks, Fat Tony, Mike Finito, Lakutis and Spank Rock as well as a beat Ad-Rock of the Beastie Boys originally made for Das Racist.

== Critical reception ==
63 and 19 received mostly positive reviews from critics. Vice described 19 and 63 as "taking the discursive and funny work he was doing with Das Racist and stripping it of any sense of structure or formula, but also work[ing] to free him from the label of 'Dude in Das Racist'". Pitchfork also praised the mixtapes, calling them "organically avant-garde", giving 19 a score of 7.9 out of 10 and 63 a 7.6. Afropunk called the record "challenging, vibrant, and sometimes brilliant". Contactmusic.com named 63 one of the ten best albums of 2013.

== Track listing ==
=== 19 ===
1. "Knowledge Born" (prod. Kool A.D.)
2. "Eroika" (prod. Steel Tipped Dove)
3. "New World" (prod. Plinio Trujillo)
4. "Marine World Africa U.S.A." (ft. Issue) (prod. Issue)
5. "Vendedores" (ft. Tray 57) (prod. Young L)
6. "Beautiful Naked Psychedelic Gherkin Exploding Tomato Sauce All over Your Face" (ft. Haji Springer and Bill Ding) (prod. Bill Ding)
7. "Wow (Bay Shit)" (ft. Trackademicks) (prod. Trackademicks)
8. "Hawaii 510" (ft. Cuzzo Fly and Citizen Chance) (prod. Mac Mean)
9. "Fresh Prince" (prod. Skywlkr)
10. "Jaleel White" (prod. Young L)
11. "Jenny Holzer" (ft. Chippy Nonstop) (prod. Ryan Marks)
12. "Kriss Kross" (prod. Steel Tipped Dove)
13. "NPR" (prod. Ad-Rock)
14. "Cheeba Cheeba" (ft. Spank Rock) (prod. Ghostdad)
15. "Attitude" (ft. Cult Days) (prod. Pictureplane)
16. "All Skreets" (ft. Dada Powell) (prod. Keyboard Kid)
17. "Finally Every Dimension of the Skreets" (prod. Kool A.D.)

=== 63 ===
1. "63" (Amaze 88 Intro)
2. "Moneyball" (prod. Mike Finito)
3. "Froyo" (ft. Detroit Cydi and Selfsays) (prod. Illingsworth)
4. "Sclera" (prod. Amaze 88)
5. "Chuck Very" (ft. Young Dave) (prod. Amaze 88)
6. "Airplane Flight" (ft. Davinci) (prod. Amaze 88)
7. "Finito Posse Jawn" (ft. Chaz Van Queen, DVS, Lakutis, Mike Finito, and Davito) (prod. Mike Finito)
8. "Get a Job" (prod. Alex Kestner)
9. "Mass Appeal" (ft. Young Dave and Amaze 88) (prod. Amaze 88)
10. "Future Primitive Culinary School" (ft. Chippy Nonstop) (prod. SPVCE)
11. "Rap Genius" (ft. Lakutis, Dallas Penn, DVS, and Meyhem Lauren) (prod. Amaze 88)
12. "OK Computer" (ft. Verbs and Maffew Ragazino) (prod. Amaze 88)
13. "Question Jam Answer" (ft. Busdriver and Beans of Antipop Consortium) (prod. Amaze 88)
14. "Ken Burns" (ft. Kassa and Dada Powell) (prod. Illingsworth)
15. "Red Wine" (ft. Open Mike Eagle) (prod. Amaze 88)
16. "Saved by the Bell" (ft. Kassa) (prod. Amaze 88)
17. "Lush" (ft. Ne$$ of Weekend Money) (prod. Amaze 88)
18. "Hydrants" (ft. Meyhem Lauren) (prod. Mike Finito)
19. "Bering Sea Gold" (prod. Amaze 88)
20. "Exotische Kunst" (prod. Kanye West)^{Note 1}
21. "Equality Understanding" (prod. Kool A.D.)

Note 1: While the track list credits Kanye West, it's only a sample.
