= Main Attrakionz =

American hip-hop duo

- Also known as: LFK
- Origin: Oakland, California
- Genres: Cloud rap; alternative hip-hop
- Years active: 2009–2015
- Labels: Green Ova Records; Mishka; Rad Reef; Young One; Vapor Records
- Past members: Mondre M.A.N.; Squadda B

Main Attrakionz was an American hip-hop duo from Oakland, California, composed of rappers Mondre M.A.N. (Damondre Grice) and Squadda B (Charles Glover).

The group were credited with pioneering the cloud rap subgenre, with Glover's sound inspiring the coinage of the term. In an interview with The Quietus, Grice claimed, "basically cloud rap was a name that was given to us".

== Career ==
Grice and Glover met in the seventh grade at Carter Middle School in Oakland and quickly began rapping together and taking part in local talent shows, later saying "[Talent shows were] fun and shit but [rapping] was like, what we were trying to do, so it was just the way it was supposed to go — we just did it however we could".

The duo continued to collaborate and became Main Attrakionz, subsequently becoming significant players of the cloud rap subgenre, consisting of "a splinter sound that's ethereal and often hooked around cascading synth lines and amorphous beats". Throughout their career, they went on to collaborate with the likes of Lil B, ASAP Rocky, SpaceGhostPurrp, Gucci Mane, Friendzone, Clams Casino and Shady Blaze among others.

Between 2009 and 2011, Main Attrakionz released 12 mixtapes. The following year on October 22, 2012, the duo released their debut studio album, Bossalinis & Fooliyones, of which Spin noted "the nine-song run from 'On Tour' to 'Bury Me a Millionaire' is as impressive as anything on a rap record this year". In their review of the album, Pitchfork said of the duo, "here are two guys who clearly love to rap and work hard at it, taking a style they can call their own, and presenting it in a more user-friendly way. More often than not, they make it work". Earlier in the same year, on March 2, Main Attrakionz released Cloudlife, a collaborative EP with both Jel and Zachg. Between 2012 and 2014, Main Attrakionz released a further 7 mixtapes.

On March 11, 2013, the duo collaborated with Montreal-based production duo, Grown Folk and Berlin-based dubstep artist, Kuedo to release the Cloud City EP, which SF Weekly noted as "probably one of their more out-there collaborations to date".

On June 30, 2015, the duo released their second and final studio album, 808s & Dark Grapes III, which was produced by East Bay-based producer duo, Friendzone.

== Discography ==
=== Studio albums ===
- Bossalinis & Fooliyones (2012)
- 808s & Dark Grapes III (2015)

=== Compilations ===
- Two Man Horror Film (2011)
- L.S.D. O.G. (Loosies in the Sky with the Diamonds of God) (2015)

=== Mixtapes ===
- Self Made Classic Vol. I: Zombies on tha Turf (2009)
- Main Attrakionz Hip Hop (2009)
- Rackstylin' 101 (2009)
- Main Attrakionz Lost Tapes 2 (2010)
- 808s & Dark Grapes (2010)
- @Greenovadjs Exclusives: July (2010)
- Best Duo Ever: The Greentape (2010)
- Blood Money (2010)
- X Mas (2010)
- Blackberry Kush (2011)
- Chandelier (2011)
- 808s & Dark Grapes II (2011)
- Chandelier Redux (2012)
- Tag Champz Bundle (2012)
- Best Duo Ever: The Bricktape (2013)
- Main Attrakionz x Tynethys (2013) (with Tynethys)
- Main Attrakionz Niggaz (2013)
- Lofi Til I Die (2014) (as LFK)
- ..As the Times Go On (2014) (as LFK)

=== EPs ===
- Wardrobe Music (2010)
- Niggas on the Run Eatin (2011)
- Cloudlife (2012) (with Jel and Zachg)
- Cloud City EP (2013) (with Grown Folk)
- Jeffro (2013)

=== Singles ===
- "Swaggin Hard" (2011)
- "Vegetables" (2011)
- "Perfect Skies" / "Chuch" (2011)
- "Diamond of God" (2011)
- "Zombies on the Turf Pt. 2" (2012)
- "Green Ova to the Top" (2012) (with Shady Blaze)
- "Women We Chase" (2012)
- "Do It for the Bay" (2012)
- "Rap Paradise" (2012)
- "Summa Time" (2013)
- "G.O. All I Know" (2014)
- "Higher" (2015) (with Danham)

=== Guest appearances ===
- Shady Blaze – "Chea" from Shady World Mixtape (2009)
- AHYVE – "Kinda Unbelieveable" from The Adventures of Ahyve Vol.2 (2010)
- SpaceGhostPurrp – "Stoner Gang" from Blackland Radio 66.6 (2011)
- Rob the Kid – "Bong Rip in Peace" from The Good, Stank, and the Dank (2011)
- Shady Blaze – "Hood Nigga" from Rappers Ain't $#!% Without a Producer (2011)
- Sortahuman – "Stonergang" from Lysergic Bliss (2011)
- Peaking Lights – "Marshmellow Yellow Remix" from Remixes (2011)
- ASAP Rocky – "Leaf" from Live. Love. ASAP (2011)
- DaVinci – "Cheeba" from The Moena Lisa (2012)
- Mishka & Rad Reef – "Hyperbolic Chamber Music" (2012)
- Lo-Fi-Fnk – "Kissing Taste (Main Attrakionz Remix)" from Kissing Taste (2012)
- Kool A.D. – "Oooh" and "Ticky Tacky" from 51 (2012)
- Jam City – "The Nite Life" from Classical Curves (2012)
- Fat Tony and Tom Cruz – "Double Up" from Double Dragon (2012)
- 100s – "Passion" from Ice Cold Perm (2012)
- Deniro Farrar & Shady Blaze – "Fallen Soldiers" from Kill or Be Killed (2012)
- Shady Blaze – "Fucked Up" from The 5th Chapter (2013)
- Mishka & Rad Reef – "Hyperbolic Chamber Music II" (2013)
- !!! – "Californiyeah (Patrick Ford Remix)" (2013)
- DaVinci & Sweet Valley – "Intl Go Girl" from Ghetto Cuisine (2014)
- Noah23 – "Tidal Wave" from Peacock Angel (2015)
- Pepperboy – "Putt'Em On" from Str8 Off tha Block 6 "Ghost Town" (2016)
