= Knife fight (disambiguation) =

A knife fight is a violent physical confrontation between two or more combatants in which one or more participants is armed with a knife.

Knife Fight may also refer to:

- Knife Fight (film), a 2012 political thriller film starring Rob Lowe and Carrie-Anne Moss
- Knife Fight (TV series), an American reality/cooking competition television series on the Esquire Network
- Knifefight (hip hop duo), a hip hop duo consisting of rapper Beans and producer Mux Mool
