= Cloudlife =

EP by Jel, Main Attrakionz and Zachg
- Released: March 2, 2012
- Genre: Cloud rap
- Length: 18:51
- Label: Rad Reef
- Producers: Jel; Zachg

Cloudlife (stylized as cLOUDLIFE) is a collaborative extended play (EP) by American record producer Jel and rappers Main Attrakionz and Zachg. It was released on Rad Reef in March 2012. The EP was named in homage to Clouddead.

== Critical reception ==
Professional ratings
Review scores
Source	Rating
Dummy	favorable
Fact	favorable

David Reyneke of Potholes in My Blog described the EP as "a quick listen for any of you out there that are struggling to keep up with Main Attrakionz's already vast catalog." Philip Mlynar of MTV said, "It's a canny, cross-generational union, with Mondre M.A.N. and Squadda's raps meshing with beats by Jel and Zachg." Brandon Soderberg of Spin wrote, "All four of cLOUDLIFE's songs are just as bizarre and inspired." He praised the EP's final song "Take Her Shoppin" and commented that the song "best captures Main Attrakionz's drifting, surprisingly emotive rapping."

== Track listing ==
No.	Title	Producer(s)	Length
1.	"Chap 3"	Jel	4:53
2.	"J Bar"	Zachg	4:47
3.	"So Whut"	Jel	3:26
4.	"Take Her Shoppin"	Zachg	5:45
Total length:			18:51

== Personnel ==
Credits adapted from the Bandcamp liner notes.

- Main Attrakionz – vocals
- Zachg – vocals (3), production (2, 4), mixing (2, 4), recording
- Jel – production (1, 3), mixing (1, 3)
- Odd Nosdam – mixing (1, 3)
- Matthewdavid – mastering
