= Last Words (EP) =

EP by Ryan Hemsworth
- Released: August 21, 2012
- Genre: Instrumental hip hop; electronic
- Length: 37:13
- Label: Wedidit
- Producer: Ryan Hemsworth; Shlohmo; Supreme Cuts; Baauer; Sam Tiba; Canblaster

Ryan Hemsworth chronology
Kitsch Genius (2012)	Last Words (2012)	Still Awake (2013)

Last Words is a 2012 EP by Canadian record producer Ryan Hemsworth. It was released on Wedidit. It features remixes from Shlohmo, Supreme Cuts, Baauer, Sam Tiba, and Canblaster. Music videos were created for "Charly Wingate" and "Colour & Movement".

== Critical reception ==
Professional ratings
Review scores
Source	Rating
East Bay Express	favorable
Pitchfork	7.7/10
Potholes in My Blog	4/5 stars
Resident Advisor	4/5 stars

Will Butler of East Bay Express said, "With Last Words, Hemsworth leaves his initial experimentation behind and clocks in with an inspiring personal best, both in style and technique." Paul Lester of The Guardian noted elements of Aphex Twin's Selected Ambient Works 85–92 in the production of Last Words.

Potholes in My Blog placed it at number 3 on the "15 Best EPs of 2012" list.

== Track listing ==
No.	Title	Length
1.	"Charly Wingate"	2:50
2.	"Colour & Movement"	4:35
3.	"The Happy Mask Shop"	3:48
4.	"Slurring"	3:50
5.	"Overthinking"	4:15
6.	"Colour & Movement (Shlohmo Remix)"	5:08
7.	"Overthinking (Supreme Cuts Remix)"	4:50
8.	"Slurring (Baauer Remix)"	3:42
9.	"Charly's Mask Shop (Sam Tiba & Canblaster Remix)"	4:15
Total length:		37:13
