= Guilt Trips =

Studio album by Ryan Hemsworth
- Released: October 22, 2013
- Genre: Electronic
- Length: 36:06
- Label: Last Gang Records
- Producer: Ryan Hemsworth

Ryan Hemsworth chronology
Distorted (2011)	Guilt Trips (2013)	Alone for the First Time (2014)

Guilt Trips is the first solo studio album by Canadian DJ/producer Ryan Hemsworth. It was released on Last Gang Records on October 22, 2013. Music videos were created for "Against a Wall" and "One for Me". The album won the 2014 Juno Award for Electronic Album of the Year.

== Production ==
Most of the album was recorded on Hemsworth's laptop computer in airports and hotels while he was on tour. It features guest appearances from Sinead Harnett, Lofty305, Baths, Tinashe, Haleek Maul, and Kitty.

== Critical reception ==
Professional ratings
Aggregate scores
Source	Rating
Metacritic	77/100
Review scores
Source	Rating
AllMusic	3.5/5 stars
Chicago Reader	favorable
Consequence of Sound	C+
Exclaim!	8/10
Fact	4/5
NME	8/10
Now	NNN
Pitchfork	7.4/10
Resident Advisor	3.5/5
The Varsity	favorable

At Metacritic, which assigns a weighted average score out of 100 to reviews from mainstream critics, Guilt Trips received an average score of 77, based on 11 reviews, indicating "generally favorable reviews".

David Jeffries of AllMusic gave the album 3.5 stars out of 5, calling it "a soft, serene, and inspired debut." Stephen Carlick of Exclaim! gave the album an 8 out of 10, commenting that "Guilt Trips is as unclassifiable as it is dazzling, a fine debut from an artist who continues to progress." Miles Raymer of Pitchfork gave the album a 7.4 out of 10, saying, "Like his DJ sets, Guilt Trips is all over the place genre-wise, but it never feels dilettantish."

Exclaim! placed the album at number 8 on its year-end list of the "Top 10 Dance & Electronic Albums".

== Track listing ==
No.	Title	Length
1.	"Small + Lost" (featuring Sinead Harnett)	2:33
2.	"Against a Wall" (featuring Lofty305)	4:33
3.	"Weird Life"	4:02
4.	"Still Cold" (featuring Baths)	2:02
5.	"Avec Vous"	3:38
6.	"Happiness & Dreams Forever"	1:42
7.	"Yaeko Mitamura Is Lonely"	3:40
8.	"Ryan Must Be Destroyed"	4:29
9.	"One for Me" (featuring Tinashe)	3:30
10.	"Day/Night/Sleep System" (featuring Haleek Maul and Kitty)	5:51
Total length:		36:06
