= Bossalinis & Fooliyones =

Studio album by Main Attrakionz
- Released: October 22, 2012
- Studio: The Nestt; The Breadquarters; Different Fur; Hyde Park
- Genre: Hip-hop
- Length: 68:32
- Label: Young One
- Producer: The Mekanix; Rob Lo; YS; Supreme Cuts; Joe Wax; Uptown Greg; Metro Zu; Harry Fraud; Zaytoven; Ammbush; WarRoom; Al Jieh; Grown Folk

Main Attrakionz chronology
Tag Champz Bundle (2012)	Bossalinis & Fooliyones (2012)	Cloud City EP (2013)

Singles from Bossalinis & Fooliyones
- 1. "Do It For the Bay" Released: August 29, 2012

Bossalinis & Fooliyones is the debut studio album by the American hip-hop duo Main Attrakionz. It was released on Young One Records on October 22, 2012. The album is produced by Harry Fraud, Zaytoven, and Supreme Cuts, among others. It features guest appearances from DaVinci, Gucci Mane, Shady Blaze, and Monsta.

== Critical reception ==
Professional ratings
Aggregate scores
Source	Rating
Metacritic	71/100
Review scores
Source	Rating
The A.V. Club	B
BBC	favorable
Exclaim!	8/10
NME	6/10
Pitchfork	7.1/10
PopMatters	5/10 stars
Spin	7/10

At Metacritic, which assigns a weighted average score out of 100 to reviews from mainstream critics, Bossalinis & Fooliyones received an average score of 71, based on 11 reviews, indicating "generally favorable reviews".

Peter Marrack of Exclaim! gave the album an 8 out of 10, calling it "a taut, humble and profoundly aware medley of late afternoon joy ― the best time to listen to it." Zach Kelly of Pitchfork gave the album a 7.1 out of 10, saying, "Here are two guys who clearly love to rap and work hard at it, taking a style they can call their own, and presenting it in a more user-friendly way."

Bossalinis & Fooliyones was listed by Spin as the "Rap Release of the Week" on October 25, 2012. Fact placed it at number 25 on the "50 Best Albums of 2012" list. SF Weekly included it on the "10 Best Bay Area Hip-Hop Records of 2012" list.

== Track listing ==
No.	Title	Producer(s)	Length
1.	"Green on Sight"	The Mekanix	3:28
2.	"Liquor Runs"	Rob Lo	2:36
3.	"La Piñata"	The Mekanix	3:50
4.	"LFK"	YS	4:00
5.	"Take U There"	Supreme Cuts	3:06
6.	"Cloud Life"	Joe Wax	4:18
7.	"On Tour"	Uptown Greg	4:32
8.	"Sex in the City"	Metro Zu	3:51
9.	"Do It for the Bay" (featuring DaVinci)	Harry Fraud	3:28
10.	"Superstitious" (featuring Gucci Mane)	Zaytoven	4:48
11.	"24th Hour"	Harry Fraud	4:07
12.	"Wings" (featuring Shady Blaze)	Ammbush	4:52
13.	"Rainy Days" (featuring Monsta)	Uptown Greg	4:33
14.	"Love Is Life"	Supreme Cuts	4:14
15.	"Bury Me a Millionaire"	WarRoom	4:35
16.	"Zoney Nights"	Al Jieh	3:56
17.	"Cloud Body"	Grown Folk	4:18
Total length:			68:32

== Personnel ==
Credits are adapted from the album's liner notes.

- Jaw Division – executive producer
- Ammbush – mixing
- Al Jieh – mastering, recording (tracks 9, 11, 16)
- Jorge Hernandez – recording (tracks 1–8, 10, 12–14, 17)
