= Not O.K. =

Mixtape by Kool A.D.
- Released: December 21, 2013
- Recorded: Oakland, California
- Genres: Hip-hop, alternative hip-hop
- Producers: Kool A.D., Oh No, Jay Casio, Toro y Moi, Amaze 88, Eyes and Teeth, Thelonious Martin, Dja, Marvy da Pimp, Iglooghost, Plinio

Kool A.D. chronology
63 and 19 (2013)	Not O.K. (2013)	Word O.K. (2014)

Professional ratings
Review scores
Source	Rating
Consequence of Sound	C+
Eastern Echo	B+
Pitchfork	6.6/10
Winnipeg Sun	4/5 stars

Not O.K. is a mixtape by Kool A.D., released December 21, 2013. The album is composed of tracks that did not make it on his forthcoming album, entitled Word O.K., and features guest appearances from Del the Funky Homosapien and Ladybug "Santos Vieira" Mecca of Digable Planets.

== Reception ==
Not O.K. received mixed reviews from critics. Pitchfork criticized the album for presenting nothing new from Kool A.D., noting that Kool A.D. lacks "a sense of stakes in his music, a hint that he’s headed somewhere or challenging himself."

== Track listing ==
No.	Title	Producer	Length
1.	"Not O.K."	Kool A.D.	1:24
2.	"V"	Oh No	2:44
3.	"Exotic"	Jay Casio	3:02
4.	"Fettucini" (featuring Amaze 88)	Toro y Moi	4:10
5.	"CNN" (featuring Del the Funkee Homosapien and Ladybug Mecca)	Amaze 88	3:37
6.	"Insane Computer Raps" (featuring Alim)	Eyes and Teeth	3:07
7.	"PLVYVHVT3" (featuring Jabee)	Thelonius Martin	2:04
8.	"Trippy Gurl"	Dja	2:50
9.	"Tiger Style" (featuring B.E. Labeau and Amaze 88)	Marvy da Pimp	4:39
10.	"Cuidado"	Amaze 88	4:07
11.	"Pass the Milk" (featuring Milo)	Iglooghost	3:23
12.	"Psychotropical" (featuring Raheem Recess)	Amaze 88	3:31
13.	"Gigglin"	Kool A.D.	0:57
14.	"Swole"	Plinio	2:59
15.	"Tears of a Dolphin"	Kool A.D.	1:11
