= Kill or Be Killed (Deniro Farrar and Shady Blaze album) =

Mixtape by Deniro Farrar and Shady Blaze
- Released: October 4, 2012
- Genre: Hip-hop
- Length: 63:56
- Producer: BK Beats; Deniro Farrar (exec.); DK All Day; Friendzone; K² (exec.); Keyboard Kid; Kira; Lunice; Nem270; Oswim SM; PBZ; Ryan Hemsworth; Shady Blaze (exec.); Sines; Spadez; Tree

Deniro Farrar chronology
| Destiny Altered (2012) | Kill or Be Killed (2012) | The Patriarch (2013) |

Shady Blaze chronology
| The Grind, Hustle & Talent (2012) | Kill or Be Killed (2012) | The Anomaly of Hip Hop (2012) |

Kill or Be Killed is a collaborative mixtape by American rappers Deniro Farrar and Shady Blaze. It was released on October 4, 2012. It includes guest appearances from Lofty305, Main Attrakionz, and Haleek Maul, as well as production from Oswin SM, Ryan Hemsworth, Keyboard Kid, Friendzone, and Nem270, among others. Lunice produced a bonus track, "All I Know".

== Critical reception ==
Professional ratings
Review scores
| Source | Rating |
|---|---|
| Consequence of Sound | B |
| Stereogum | favorable |

Michael Madden of Consequence of Sound gave the album a grade of B, calling it "a success throughout, thanks to its embracement of well-tested sounds and its track-for-track consistency." He wrote, "Deniro and Shady have emerged as one of the strongest pairings in rap this year, and future collaborations between the two should be more than welcomed."

Impose included it on the "Best Music of October 2012" list. Stereogum placed it at number 39 on the "Top 40 Rap Albums of 2012" list.

== Track listing ==
| No. | Title | Producer(s) | Length |
|---|---|---|---|
| 1. | "Kill on Sight" | Oswin SM | 4:47 |
| 2. | "43 Hours In" (featuring ST 2 Lettaz) | Ryan Hemsworth | 4:43 |
| 3. | "Therapture" | Keyboard Kid | 3:40 |
| 4. | "All the Way" (featuring Lofty305, Squadda B and Deecee) | Friendzone | 4:20 |
| 5. | "Breaking Ties" | Kira | 3:51 |
| 6. | "Back/Forth/Back" | Friendzone | 3:15 |
| 7. | "On My Block" | Spadez | 2:57 |
| 8. | "Fallen Soldiers" (featuring Main Attrakionz) | Hemsworth | 5:12 |
| 9. | "Cold Blood" (featuring Haleek Maul) | Hemsworth | 4:41 |
| 10. | "Rollin'" | DK All Day | 5:16 |
| 11. | "Ballad of the Lost Souls" | Keyboard Kid | 3:18 |
| 12. | "Madonna" | Hemsworth | 3:47 |
| 13. | "Stayin' Alive" (featuring Tree) | Tree | 3:08 |
| 14. | "Ugotme" | Sines | 3:53 |
| 15. | "Soul Fly Remix" (featuring Boldy James) | BK Beats; PBZ | 4:39 |
| 16. | "NWO" | Nem270 | 2:23 |
| 17. | "All I Know" (bonus track) | Lunice | 4:26 |
