= 808s & Dark Grapes III =

Studio album by Main Attrakionz
- Released: June 30, 2015
- Studio: Perfect Skies
- Genre: Hip-hop
- Length: 43:36
- Label: Vapor Records
- Producer: Friendzone

Main Attrakionz chronology
..As the Times Go On (2014)	808s & Dark Grapes III (2015)

Singles from 808s & Dark Grapes III
- 1. "Summa Time" Released: July 4, 2013; 2. "G.O All I Know" Released: February 10, 2014

808s & Dark Grapes III is the second and final studio album by the American hip-hop duo Main Attrakionz. It was released on Vapor Records on June 30, 2015. It is the third installment of the duo's 808s & Dark Grapes series. Entirely produced by Friendzone, it features guest appearances from Shady Blaze, Robbie Rob, Dope G, and Lo da Kid.

== Critical reception ==
Professional ratings
Aggregate scores
Source	Rating
Metacritic	77/100
Review scores
Source	Rating
AllMusic	3.5/5 stars
Cokemachineglow	favorable
Exclaim!	8/10
Pitchfork	7.4/10

At Metacritic, which assigns a weighted average score out of 100 to reviews from mainstream critics, 808s & Dark Grapes III received an average score of 77, based on 4 reviews, indicating "generally favorable reviews".

Paul Simpson of AllMusic gave the album 3.5 stars out of 5 and called it "an enjoyable, highly focused effort." Calum Slingerland of Exclaim! gave the album an 8 out of 10, saying, "While the two have never been lauded as top-tier lyricists, their liberal approach to flow and delivery keeps their work engaging". Meaghan Garvey of Pitchfork gave the album a 7.4 out of 10, describing it as "bombastic and baroque, certainly not lo-fi".

SF Weekly placed the album at number 4 on the "Top 7 Bay Area Hip-Hop Albums of 2015" list. The album was also included on Cokemachineglow's "Unison / Harmony 2015" list.

== Track listing ==
All tracks are written by Charles Glover and Damondre Grice, and produced by Friendzone.

No.	Title	Length
1.	"Shoot the Dice" (featuring Shady Blaze)	3:43
2.	"G.O Style" (featuring Robbie Rob, Dope G, and Lo da Kid)	5:29
3.	"Dip"	2:56
4.	"Spoken Jewelz"	3:23
5.	"Ain't No Other Way"	3:18
6.	"Cycles"	3:26
7.	"My Story"	3:22
8.	"Right Now"	2:32
9.	"Summa Time"	3:50
10.	"Green Ova Diamond"	4:04
11.	"G.O All I Know"	3:33
12.	"Two Man Horror Film" (featuring Shady Blaze)	3:54
Total length:		43:36

== Personnel ==
Credits are adapted from the album's liner notes.

- Chris Bellman – mastering
- Friendzone – engineering, mixing, producer, recording
- James Laurence – art direction
- Zack Rabinowitz – management
- Natassia Zolot – photos
