= Dasychira (musician) =

South African American musician

- Born: Adrian Hubertus Bartholomew Martens; Johannesburg, South Africa
- Origin: New York
- Genres: Electronic; avant-pop; experimental; New Age
- Occupations: Musician, composer, record producer, DJ
- Years active: 2015–present
- Labels: Blueberry Records; unseelie
- Website: dasychira.bandcamp.com

Adrian Martens, known professionally as Dasychira (/ˌdɑːsɪˈkɪərə/ DAH-sik-EER-ə) is a South African-born musician and record producer based in New York. Dasychira released EPs Immolated (2017), Haptics (2018), debut album xDream (2019) on Blueberry Records and second album Undead (2024) on unseelie. They are a co-founder of the art collective and music label unseelie.

== Career ==
Martens studied music at the Clive Davis Institute of Recorded Music at New York University.

In January 2017, they released the single "Vipera" featuring New York singer Embaci and announced their first release on FaltyDL's Blueberry Records called Immolated. Tiny Mix Tapes gave the album 4/5 and said:

Relentlessly, productions veer into massified attempts at cinematically swallowing whole experiences of apocalypse, dysmorphia, and alienation into highly coded extensions of personal will. Dasychira’s music skirts through this milieu with a truly thoughtful impermanence

The following year, Dasychira released the EP Haptics on Blueberry Records, featuring collaborations with Haleek Maul, Malibu, and Embaci. Debut album xDream was released on Blueberry Records October 31, 2019. Their mixtape Hollywood Forever was published on unseelie in May 2021. Their song "Banyan Tree" was released on February 10, 2023 on unseelie, the first single from their 2024 album Undead on unseelie.

In addition to their solo work, they have production credits for Saul Williams, Haleek Maul, Embaci, Yikii and Daniela Lalita.

== Discography ==
=== Studio albums ===
- xDream (2019, Blueberry)
- Undead (2024, unseelie)

=== Extended plays ===
- Immolated (2017, Blueberry)
- Haptics (2018, Blueberry)

=== Mixtapes ===
- Hollywood Forever (2021, unseelie)

=== Compilation album ===
- xDream (Deluxe Edition) (2020, unseelie)
- Undead (Instrumentals) (2025, unseelie)

=== Singles ===
- Vipera ft. Embaci (2017, Blueberry)
- Caduceus (2017, Blueberry)
- Razor Leaf (2018, self-released)
- Swing (2018, Blueberry)
- Umbreon ft. Malibu (2018, Blueberry)
- Scalaris ft. Haleek Maul (2018, Blueberry)
- Talons ft. Embaci (2018, Blueberry)
- Have A Few Laughs (2018, Rest Now!)
- xDream (2019, Blueberry)
- Pandora ft. Yikii (2019, Blueberry)
- Swirl ft. Malibu (2019, Blueberry)
- Let's Share Your Memory Together Ft. Baby Blue (2019, Blueberry)
- Puppet Ballerina Edit Ft. Embaci (2019, Blueberry)
- Parabiotic Dream (2019, Blueberry)
- Jester's Crowfield (2020, self-released)
- dDream (2020, self-released)
- Beauty Contest Gift (2020, AQNB)
- Deadnettle (2020, Blueberry)
- KK Dirge (2020, Quantum Natives)
- Garden of Earthly Delights (2020, Slagwerk)
- Sunset & Wine (2021, unseelie)
- B340 (2021, unseelie)
- Eternal Family (2021, unseelie)
- Heaven's Gate (2021, unseelie)
- Agwe (Dasychira Meteor Shower Remix ft. Embaci) (2021, CHANN3L)
- Banyan Tree (2023, unseelie)
- Tuesday (2024, unseelie)
- Charlotte’s Song (2026, self-released)

=== With Embaci ===
==== Singles ====
- Tiniest Whisper [additional production] (2022)
- Undead (2024, unseelie)

=== With Yikii ===
==== Extended plays ====
- Bubble Wrap Armor (2019, unseelie)

==== Singles ====
- Future Tell (2019, unseelie)
- Faerie Circus Waltz (2019, unseelie)

=== With Emily Glass ===
==== Singles ====
- We Will Find It (2020, unseelie)

=== With Yikii & sentinel ===
- Mouse Cog (2021, Imum Coeli)
