= Alone for the First Time =

Studio album by Ryan Hemsworth
- Released: November 4, 2014
- Genre: Electronic
- Length: 27:47
- Labels: Last Gang Records; Secret Songs
- Producer: Ryan Hemsworth

Ryan Hemsworth chronology
| Guilt Trips (2013) | Alone for the First Time (2014) | Elsewhere (2018) |

Singles from Alone for the First Time
- 1. "Snow in Newark" Released: September 23, 2014; 2. "Too Long Here" Released: January 22, 2015; 3. "Surrounded" Released: January 22, 2016

Alone for the First Time is the second solo studio album by Canadian record producer Ryan Hemsworth. It was released on Last Gang Records and Secret Songs on November 4, 2014. Music videos were created for "Snow in Newark", "Too Long Here", and "Surrounded". The album was nominated for the 2015 Juno Award for Electronic Album of the Year.

== Critical reception ==
Professional ratings
Aggregate scores
| Source | Rating |
|---|---|
| Metacritic | 72/100 |
Review scores
| Source | Rating |
| Clash | 8/10 |
| CMJ | favorable |
| Consequence of Sound | B− |
| DIY | 4/5 stars |
| Exclaim! | 7/10 |
| Pitchfork | 6.0/10 |

At Metacritic, which assigns a weighted average score out of 100 to reviews from mainstream critics, Alone for the First Time received an average score of 72, based on 9 reviews, indicating "generally favorable reviews".

Felicity Martin of Clash gave the album an 8 out of 10, saying, "It's a sad record, but one that envelops you in a warm hug, wipes your eyes and plays with your hair." Jonah Bromwich of Pitchfork gave the album a 6.0 out of 10, commenting that "Alone for the First Time is the furthest he's pushed himself, and the growing pains on the album can be chalked up to the strain of trying new things, a kind of adolescent awkwardness that shows signs of maturing into something sophisticated and unique."

CMJ placed the album at number 3 on the "30 Best Albums of 2014" list.

== Track listing ==
| No. | Title | Length |
|---|---|---|
| 1. | "Hurt Me" | 3:30 |
| 2. | "Walk Me Home" (featuring Lontalius) | 3:43 |
| 3. | "Snow in Newark" (featuring Dawn Golden) | 4:04 |
| 4. | "Blemish" | 2:30 |
| 5. | "Too Long Here" (featuring Alex G) | 3:27 |
| 6. | "Surrounded" (featuring Kotomi and Doss) | 5:01 |
| 7. | "By Myself" (featuring The GTW and Little Cloud) | 5:32 |
| Total length: | | 27:47 |

Japanese edition bonus tracks
| No. | Title | Length |
|---|---|---|
| 8. | "Every Square Inch" (featuring Qrion) | 4:31 |
| 9. | "Inside the Heart" (featuring tofubeats) | 3:56 |
| 10. | "Cream Soda" (featuring Tomggg) | 4:22 |
| 11. | "Snow in Newark (XXYYXX Remix)" (featuring Dawn Golden) | 3:31 |
| 12. | "Walk Me Home (Live Version)" (featuring Lontalius) | 3:17 |
| Total length: | | 47:25 |
