= Errol (album) =

Studio album by Haleek Maul
- Released: February 28, 2020
- Genre: Hip-hop
- Length: 35:49
- Label: Lex
- Producers: Gila; Morris; Brandon Peralta; Hlmnsra; Chris Rose; Sebastian Sartor; Sega Bodega; Haleek Maul; Hudson Alexander; Shaayz; Pablo Melendez

Haleek Maul chronology
In Permanence (2018)	Errol (2020)

Singles from Errol
- 1. "Ceiling Fan" Released: October 16, 2019; 2. "Halo" Released: November 13, 2019; 3. "Abyss" Released: November 27, 2019; 4. "Lucid" Released: December 11, 2019; 5. "Get2high" Released: January 29, 2020

Errol is the debut studio album by American rapper and record producer Haleek Maul. It was released on Lex Records on February 28, 2020. The album is named for and dedicated to his late grandfather. He said: "With this project I'm working through a lot of the things I've learned since I lost him, as well as speaking on the transformation I'm undergoing as an artist and person."

== Critical reception ==
Professional ratings
Aggregate scores
Source	Rating
Metacritic	68/100
Review scores
Source	Rating
The Guardian	4/5 stars
MusicOMH	3/5 stars

At Metacritic, which assigns a weighted average score out of 100 to reviews from mainstream critics, the album received an average score of 68, based on 5 reviews, indicating "generally favorable reviews".

== Track listing ==
No.	Title	Writer(s)	Producer(s)	Length
1.	"We Wid It" (featuring Jah Koda)	Jacoda Clarke; Malik Hall; Kyle Reid	Gila	2:10
2.	"Ceiling Fan"	Philesciono M. Canty II; Malik Hall	Morris; Brandon Peralta^{[a]}	1:54
3.	"Relax" (featuring Island Levvy)	Malik Hall; Nicholas Lett; Raimondo Taibi	Hlmnsra	3:08
4.	"Glitching"	Malik Hall; Christopher Rose	Chris Rose	2:48
5.	"Halo" (featuring Mick Jenkins)	Malik Hall; Jayson Mick Jenkins; Sebastian Sartor	Sebastian Sartor	3:51
6.	"Pretty Color"	Malik Hall; Kyle Reid	Gila	2:54
7.	"Get2high"	Malik Hall; Salvador Navarrete	Sega Bodega; Haleek Maul^{[a]}	2:51
8.	"Lucid" (featuring Sean Leon)	Hudson Fedun; Malik Hall; Matthew Sean Leon	Hudson Alexander; Haleek Maul^{[a]}	3:29
9.	"Dwgwy"	Malik Hall; Kyle Reid	Gila	3:36
10.	"Abyss" (featuring Ro Ransom)	Noah Gale; Malik Hall; Shay Newton	Shaayz; Haleek Maul^{[a]}	2:54
11.	"Name" (featuring Fantom Dundeal)	Arlon Griffith; Malik Hall; Pablo Melendez	Pablo Melendez	2:27
12.	"Feelings" (featuring Aron)	Nora Dukler; Malik Hall; Kyle Reid	Gila	3:41
Total length:				35:49

Notes

- ^{^[a]} signifies an additional producer.

== Personnel ==
Credits adapted from liner notes.

- Haleek Maul – vocals, additional production (7, 8, 10)
- Jah Koda – vocals (1)
- Gila – production (1, 6, 9, 12)
- Morris – production (2)
- Brandon Peralta – additional production (2), mixing
- Island Levvy – vocals (3)
- Hlmnsra – production (3)
- Chris Rose – production (4)
- Mick Jenkins – vocals (5)
- Sebastian Sartor – production (5)
- Lili Renwick – additional vocals (6)
- Sega Bodega – production (7)
- Sean Leon – vocals (8)
- Matthew Rotker-Lynn – guitar (8)
- Hudson Alexander – production (8)
- Ro Ransom – vocals (10)
- Shaayz – production (10)
- Fantom Dundeal – vocals (11)
- Pablo Melendez – production (11)
- Aron – vocals (12)
- Noel Summerville – mastering
- Ansuni Hall – cover
- Commission Studio – design
