= Ready Is Always Too Late =

Studio album by Sinéad Harnett
- Released: 21 May 2021
- Length: 33:06
- Label: Thairish Limited
- Producer: M-Phazes; Linden Jay; Stint; Grades; JD Reid; P2J; Jeff "Gitty" Gitelman; Sunny Kale; Mike Brainchild; Toddla T

Sinéad Harnett chronology
Lessons in Love (2019)	Ready Is Always Too Late (2021)	Boundaries (2024)

Singles from Ready Is Always Too Late
- 1. "Stickin'" Released: 10 July 2020; 2. "Take Me Away" Released: 16 October 2020; 3. "At Your Best (You Are Love)" Released: 8 January 2021; 4. "Last Love" Released: 23 February 2021; 5. "Hard 4 Me 2 Love You" Released: 13 April 2021; 6. "Ready Is Always Too Late" Released: 23 May 2021; 7. "Where You Been Hiding" Released: 3 December 2021

Professional ratings
Review scores
Source	Rating
Clash	8/10
The Line of Best Fit	8/10

Ready Is Always Too Late is the second studio album by English singer Sinéad Harnett, released on 21 May 2021 by Thairish Limited. It follows her 2019 debut album, Lessons in Love. In an interview with Rated R&B, Harnett explained the meaning behind the title. "The inspiration for that title came from track one, which was about me really feeling someone and he didn’t feel the same. He would say things like, ‘You know, we’re not really there yet. Let’s wait until we’re ready.’ From one kind of quite light-hearted, rejection song, came the theme. I’ve been grafting on my sound and really on myself as a person, because I feel like until you gain that confidence and that self-assured tone to your life it’s really quite hard to be like, ‘this is the artist that I am, listen to me,’” she said.

== Track listing ==
Ready Is Always Too Late track listing
No.	Title	Writer(s)	Producer(s)	Length
1.	"Ready Is Always Too Late"	Sinéad Harnett; Reuben James; Linden Jay	Jay	4:02
2.	"Stay"	Harnett; Dayyon Alexander; Ajay Bhattacharya	Stint	3:14
3.	"Take Me Away" (featuring EarthGang)	Harnett; Todd Pritchard; Johnny Venus; Daniel Traynor	Grades	2:52
4.	"Last Love"	Harnett; Vivyen; Jordan D. Reid	JD Reid	2:33
5.	"Anymore" (featuring Lucky Daye)	Harnett; Nathaniel Warner; Hayley Gene Penner; David Brown; AoD; Ari PenSmith; Richard Isong	P2J	3:16
6.	"Hard 4 Me 2 Love You"	Harnett; Jae Stephens; Mark Landon	M-Phazes	3:50
7.	"J.L (Interlude)"	Harnett		0:39
8.	"Like This"	Harnett; Jeff Gitelman	Gitty	2:52
9.	"Stickin'" (featuring Masego & VanJess)	Harnett; Warner; Sunny Kale; Michael Engmann; Ivana Nwokike; Jessica Nwokike; Micah Davis	Kale; Mike Brainchild	3:09
10.	"Obvious"	Harnett; Adrian McLeod; Jay; Thomas McKenzie Bell	Toddla T	2:58
11.	"Distraction"	Harnett; Spill My Ink; Landon	M-Phazes	3:41
Total length:				33:06

Ready Is Always Too Late (Deluxe) track listing
No.	Title	Writer(s)	Producer(s)	Length
12.	"At Your Best (You Are Love)"	Isley Brothers; Chris Jasper	Nate Notes	4:34
13.	"Let Go"	Harnett; Stephens; Jayla Darden	Darden	2:53
14.	"Where You Been Hiding"	Harnett; Aidan Rodriguez; Stephens; M-Phazes	M-Phazes	3:27
Total length:				44:00
