= DX (album) =

Studio album by Friendzone
- Released: October 9, 2013
- Genre: Instrumental hip-hop
- Length: 94:02
- Label: Self-released
- Producer: Friendzone

Friendzone chronology
DX (2013)	While U Wait (2015)

Professional ratings
Review scores
Source	Rating
Chicago Reader	favorable
Cokemachineglow	favorable
Cookie Scene	favorable

DX is the only studio album by American hip-hop record production duo Friendzone. It was released on October 9, 2013. A music video was created for "Poly".

In an interview with Fact, James Laurence said, "DX is an album 100%, this is our heart and soul." Dylan Reznick said, "I wanted to make an album that would make people's heads spin, make them rethink their ideas about music a little."

== Critical reception ==
Fact placed the album at number 47 on the "50 Best Albums of 2013" list. Writing for Fact, John Twells described it as "the most distilled example of their sound – a sunny, hopeful fusion of 16-bit melodies, anime joy, IDM fuzz and Atlanta beats." Cokemachineglow placed the album at number 3 on the "Top 30 Albums 2013" list. Brent Ables of Cokemachineglow wrote, "it marks their progression from top-notch producers to genuine composers in their own right."

== Track listing ==
No.	Title	Length
1.	"Taswell"	5:25
2.	"Retailxtal"	4:20
3.	"Passion Breathing"	4:12
4.	"Rest Pt. 2"	4:48
5.	"All My Life+"	4:18
6.	"Hislo" (featuring Finally Boys)	5:56
7.	"Amore"	3:30
8.	"Poly"	5:57
9.	"Luv You More than Anything"	4:26
10.	"8AM"	3:53
11.	"Another Jam for the Ages~!"	3:42
12.	"Yr Touch Yr Bliss"	5:20
13.	"4 Yia Yia" (bonus track)	3:32
14.	"If U Knew" (bonus track)	3:22
15.	"Truth" (bonus track; featuring Jeffro)	3:53
16.	"Rest" (bonus track)	3:21
17.	"First Love XOXO" (bonus track)	3:41
18.	"Always" (bonus track)	3:53
19.	"Customer I + II" (bonus track)	4:18
20.	"L.R.C." (bonus track)	7:01
21.	"Shut the World Out" (bonus track)	5:05
