= Classical Curves =

2012 studio album by Jam City

Studio album by Jam City
- Released: 28 May 2012
- Recorded: spring–summer 2011
- Genres: Electronic; UK bass; deconstructed club
- Length: 39:58
- Label: Night Slugs
- Producer: Jam City

Jam City chronology
Classical Curves (2012)	Dream a Garden (2015)

Classical Curves is the debut studio album by British electronic music producer Jam City. It was released on 28 May 2012 by Night Slugs. It received critical praise, and has since been acclaimed as an influential release in UK dance music by publications such as The Quietus and Fact.

== Background and production ==
The press release for Classical Curves, published by Night Slugs in April 2012, detailed it as being 'a record that owes equal parts to Philly Club as it does to Laurie Anderson, The Neptunes as it does to Einstürzende Neubauten, Steve Poindexter as it does to the soft jazz leads of Pat Metheny. It detailed Jam City's own atmospheric intents, noting almost synesthetic details about its musical textures and sound palette.

We are engulfed in booming, monolithic kick drums/We are floating on a pink cloud. We are thrashed and contorted by sheets of metal/We are suspended in breathy quiet of sighing voices and raindrops kissing the windowpane – and then it erupts again.

Jam City aimed to tailor his productions towards the club environment, noting "...when you’re forced to experience that in a club it brings it to life in a totally different way, and I think the more you go to clubs and hear music on a really loud soundsystem, the more you’re able to try and write music for that environment. You think about space and shape a bit more." On this basis, he attempted to "make [his music] more and more minimal". He also noted that he was becoming fascinated by the 'aesthetics of wealth and the modern world', "like mansions in Beverly Hills or Dubai. I don’t even know how I’d begin to make a club track that sounded like some mansion in the Hollywood Hills, but it’s just an easy starting point" and that this interest fed into his productions. The resulting glossy, post-dubstep sound established Jam City's reputation for creating instrumentals from club music tropes.

Multiple tracks on Classical Curves, such as "Her", "The Courts" and "How We Relate to the Body" use staccato-based rhythms directly inspired by Jersey club music.

== Critical reception ==
Professional ratings
Review scores
Source	Rating
AllMusic	4/5 stars
Clash	6/10
Fact	4.5/5 stars
Pitchfork	7.3/10
Resident Advisor	4.5/5 stars

Classical Curves appeared in multiple end-of-year lists and received positive review from the press. Rory Gibb of The Quietus called it "one of the most interesting album-length listens to come from a UK club producer in a while, [...] a reminder that many sub-heavy dancefloors post-dubstep ought often to be demanding more for their money." Fact magazine's Tom Lea said "Both Classical Curves and Girl Unit’s recent Club Rez feel like they could mark the start of a new stage for Night Slugs. Not only are they among the best records that the label’s put out in its short but impressive history..." and called it "one of 2012’s best and most provocative albums." It also appeared at number 7 in their "Best of 2012", where it was described as "easily the most modern-sounding record on this list" and "an album that surprised, disoriented and delighted at every turn."

Resident Advisor's Todd Burns gave the album a score of 4.5/5, and noted parallels between Classical Curves and the work of experimental synthpop group, Art of Noise, saying that the latter group "was basically a hugely expensive experiment designed to uncover new sounds; nearly 30 years later, Latham's music sounds like it's using shiny, new software to create old ones". Mike Powell of Pitchfork wrote that the music "achieves as much of its effect through silence as through sound: Between every beat, the space is so absolute and empty that getting to the next piece of solid ground is a kind of perpetual thrill."

== Influence and legacy ==
In the years since the release, the influence of Classical Curves on Latham's musical peers has been noted, especially in the post-grime-leaning productions released on Keysound Productions, Her Records and Night Slugs. In an interview with The Quietus, Night Slugs head Bok Bok said "I would like to state that I think it's really nice that people are becoming aware of this album's long term influence... It's interesting, I can play a whole set of tracks that basically rip off two or three key tracks on Classical Curves. Some of them do it in a good way, some of them do it in a less original way that I don't really like so much.". In its 2014 feature on "The 100 Best Albums of the Decade So Far", Fact ranked the album at number five, writing: "Few albums in this list have been as influential as Jam City's Classical Curves. In the two years since its release, a host of producers have attempted to replicate the album’s precision crafted, chrome-plated sound, and most have failed to even come close to evoking the singular vision put forth by Jack Latham on his debut."

Simon Reynolds discussed the album in his 2019 Pitchfork article on the rise of "conceptronica" in the 2010s, writing that the record's "glossily surface-oriented" sound made Jam City's polemic-focused concepts more striking. He added that while the album concerned the 'aesthetics of wealth', the "sorcerous allure of artifice and illusion [was] seemingly left unchallenged." He also wrote that the album likely marked the first appearance of the "crashing drum", a dramatic sound that appeared on most 2010s 'conceptronica', adding that the sound's "imposing but ungroovy approach" is a central factor to "what the critic Matthew Phillips identifies as a 'neo-futurist' aesthetic in electronic music." Also in 2019, Crack Magazine ranked Classical Curves ninth in their list of "The top 100 albums of the decade"; contributor Oscar Henson wrote that the record inspired deconstructed club in the manner in which it isolates familiar ideas from their musical contexts and abstracts them "to form radical new structures". He continued:

"At the time of release, Classical Curves sounded unlike anything that had come before. Although packed with references to Detroit house, funk, grime and Jersey club, these elements had been exploded and reassembled beyond recognition. The rhythms were stop-start; the drums exploded like malfunctioning machinery; and all recognisable sounds had been re-rendered with a hyperreal gloss sheen. Perhaps more than any electronic album of the decade, Classical Curves sounded unrelentingly like the future. Today, the album's sonic hallmarks are still being rehashed and reinterpreted to create some of the most exciting, exhilarating and bewildering moments found on the dancefloor."

In 2025, Resident Advisor ranked Classical Curves at number 60 in their list of "The Best Electronic Records 2000–25"; contributor Rachel Grace Amladia described it as the "most complete statement" of the deconstructed club sound, deeming it "highly conceptual, barely danceable, yet endlessly charming."

== Track listing ==
No.	Title	Length
1.	"Backseat Becomes a Zone While We Glide"	1:34
2.	"Her"	2:28
3.	"The Courts"	4:25
4.	"B.A.D."	4:15
5.	"How We Relate to the Body"	5:20
6.	"Club Thanz"	3:45
7.	"Hyatt Park Nights Pt. 1"	5:03
8.	"Hyatt Park Nights Pt. 2"	2:07
9.	"Strawberries"	4:05
10.	"Love Is Real"	6:56
11.	"The Nite Life" (featuring Main Attrakionz)	4:33
