= Jenn Mierau =

- Born: Jenn Mierau; Winnipeg, Manitoba, Canada
- Origin: Montreal, Quebec, Canada
- Genres: Indie pop, electropop, dream pop, electronic
- Occupation: Singer-songwriter
- Website: www.songsofjenn.com

Jenn Mierau is a Canadian electropop musician originally from Winnipeg, Manitoba, who is now based in Montreal, Quebec.

== Biography ==
Jenn Mierau is a self-producing and recording musician. Mierau sings, plays Wurlitzer, makes beats, and also plays bass and electric guitar on her tracks. Mierau started eventually experimenting with found-sound samples and vocal layering. Her album Hush was described as smoky gothic synth pop, "a tasteful and experimental pop album that ranks comfortably among the likes of Robyn and Lykke Li."

Mierau also is an active DIY advocate. For her 2011 album Hush she rug-hooked a 14,400 stitch self-portrait while recording a time-lapse video of the process. The physical CD replicated the entire rug from front to back and side to side.

Jenn Mierau has released music (her own and collaborations) on various labels: Defected, de'fchild productions, Semisquare Music, Galactique Recordings and The Villa. Her CD, hush, was self-released.

== Discography ==
=== Albums ===
- Hush (2011)

=== EPs ===
- Hush: Remixed (2011)
- Merry Merry (2012)

=== Singles ===
- Hum (2010)
- Coventry Carol (2012)
- Silent Night (2012)

=== Guest appearances ===
- Ruoho Ruotsi – "A Little Haiku" (2011)
- Ryan Hemsworth – "Someone to Make You Crazy" (2011)
