= Global Intimacy =

2018 album by Barney McAll

Studio album by Barney Mcall (TQX)
- Released: 7 December 2018
- Genre: Pop
- Length: 52:25
- Label: Extra Celestial Arts; Inpartmaint Inc.
- Producer: Barney McAll

Singles from Global Intimacy
- 1. "The Day That You Moved On" Released: 10 November 2017; 2. "The Day That You Moved On (Abhi The Nomad & Ellis Miah Remix)" Released: 9 February 2018; 3. "When They Come For Us" Released: 5 April 2018; 4. "Text Me Back" Released: 6 July 2018; 5. "The End Is The Beginning" Released: 28 July 2018; 6. "Double Click To Kill" Released: 24 August 2018; 7. "Useless Generation" Released: 25 January 2019

Global Intimacy is the thirteenth studio album by Australian jazz pianist and composer Barney McAll. It was released worldwide on 7 December 2018. Global Intimacy was released under the pseudonym TQX, also known as TourniquetX.

The album is inspired by the dystopian prophecies of TV drama Black Mirror, the Hollywood movie Her, and the very real spread of fake news via online networks. TQX wants to draw attention to this nightmarish situation, and wants to make everyone question the reliance on screens. The album cover is an image made by Banksy.

== Track listing ==
Global Intimacy track listing
No.	Title	Writer(s)	Producer(s)	Length
1.	"Log Off And Live" (featuring Kool A.D.)	Barney McAll; Kool A.D.	McAll	02:36
2.	"Text Forgiveness" (featuring Invenio Singers)	Traditional	Traditional	00:32
3.	"Text Me Back" (featuring Sirah & Kool A.D.)	McAll; Sia Furler; Sirah; Kool A.D.	McAll; Genji Siraisi	03:25
4.	"The End Is The Beginning" (featuring Genevieve Artadi)	McAll; Phil Rose	McAll; Justin Shave	03:39
5.	"Double Click To Kill" (featuring KiDD iCARUS & Belle Bangard)	McAll; Gabriel Winterfield; Rose	McAll	02:47
6.	"When They Come For Us" (featuring Daniel Merriweather)	McAll; Merriweather	McAll; Gareth Thompson	04:15
7.	"Living The Greatest Lie" (featuring Shayna Steele)	McAll; Rose	McAll; Ellis Miah	04:32
8.	"The Day That You Moved On" (featuring Sia)	McAll; Furler	McAll	03:21
9.	"As The World Ends" (featuring Gian Slater & Pete Miser)	McAll; Rose; Slater; Miser	McAll; Siraisi	03:24
10.	"Intellectual Property Theft" (featuring Malik Work)	McAll; Rose; Work	McAll; Aaron Choulai	03:02
11.	"Facebook Killed The Arts" (featuring Josh Mease)	McAll; Rose; Furler	McAll; Siraisi	03:11
12.	"The Day That You Moved On (Abhi The Nomad & Ellis Miah Remix)" (featuring Sia, Abhi The Nomad & Ellis Miah)	McAll; Furler	McAll; Abhi The Nomad; Miah	03:18
13.	"Useless Generation" (featuring Cormega & Kool A.D.)	McAll; Rose; Cormega; Kool A.D.	McAll	02:57
14.	"You Played The Knife" (featuring Gian Slater)	McAll; Slater	McAll	04:04
15.	"Ghostly Machine" (featuring Gian Slater)	McAll	McAll	03:34
16.	"Pay No Attention" (featuring Ben Monder)	Monder	McAll	01:37
17.	"Do Not React" (featuring Invenio Singers)	McAll	McAll	02:03
Total length:				52:25

== Critical reception ==
NME described "The Day That You Moved On" as "mind bending" and "epic".

Professional ratings
Review scores
Source	Rating
The Sydney Morning Herald	3/5 stars

The Sydney Morning Herald's Kish Lal gave the album three stars out of five and stated that the production of Global Intimacy is slick and reminiscent of PC Music's 2014 brand of anti-pop, yet elevated for this year. 4ZZZ's Chris Cobcroft noted that Global Intimacy is more-or-less a top-forty pop / hip hop record, that can be as sugary as any of Sia's more recent confections. He also noted that lyrics are, the densest diatribe against the evils of the corporate music industry, technology, fascism, capitalism and more. The Australian's Eric Meyers said about the album that the key to this work is the preponderance of lovely pop songs which comprise more than half the album. He also noted that they feature beautiful melody lines, highly intelligent lyrics, and the rich vocal harmonies characteristic of the best pop music, put together with considerable mastery.
