= Sinéad Harnett =

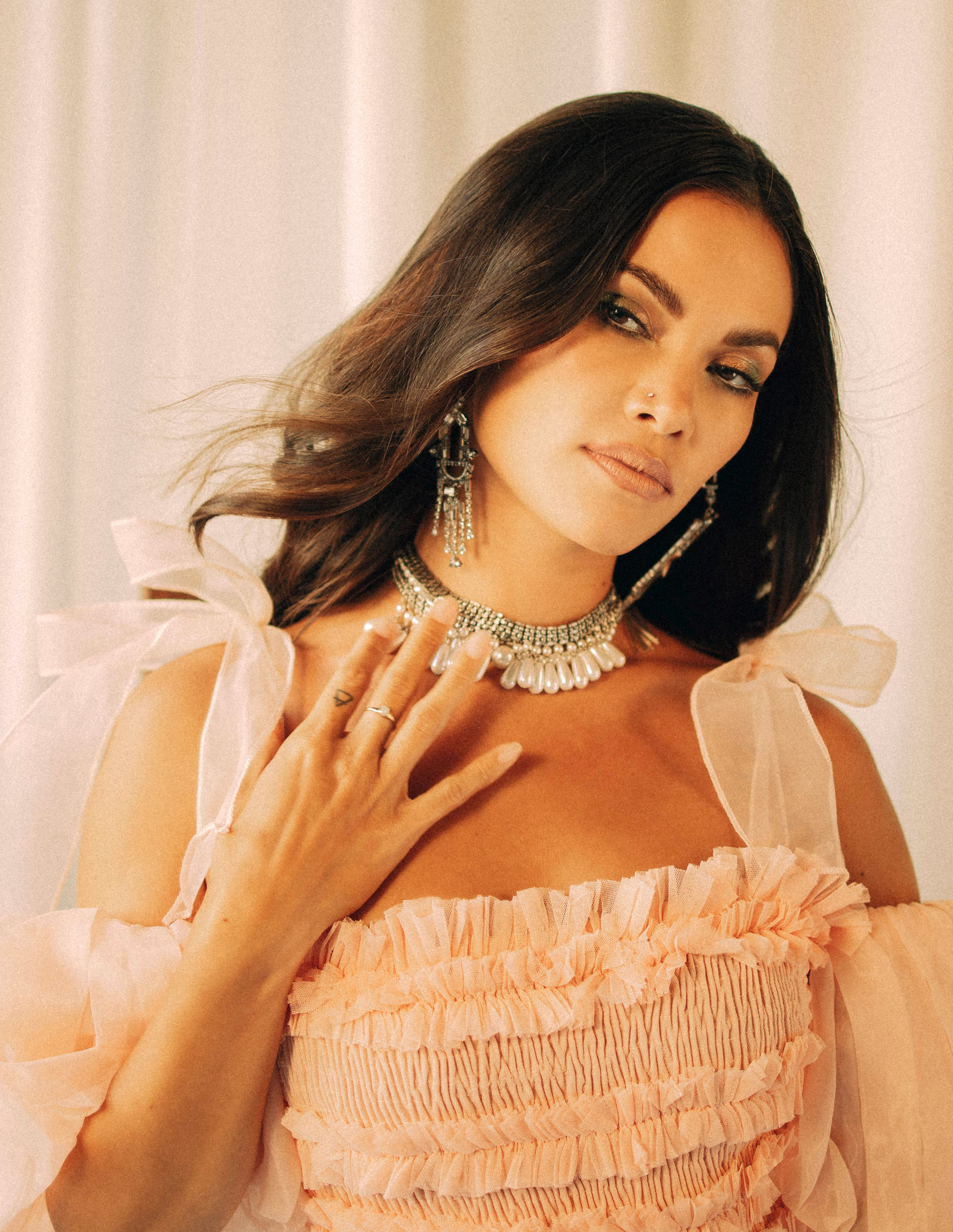

Background information
- Born: 12 October 1989 (age 37); London, England
- Genres: R&B; electronic; soul; dance
- Occupations: Singer; songwriter
- Years active: 2011–present
- Labels: Black Butter; 333; Virgin EMI; 10K Projects

Sinéad Monica Harnett (born 12 October 1989) is a British singer and songwriter.

== Early life ==
Born to a Thai mother and an Irish father who separated when she was a toddler, Harnett was raised by her mother in Finchley, north London while her father lived in Australia. Harnett attended Holly Park Primary School in Friern Barnet. She also took weekend dance classes at the Royal Ballet School (in Barons Court at the time). She went on to study at Arts University College Bournemouth, where she pursued a degree in acting and appeared in student productions of plays such as One Thousand and One Nights.

== Career ==
Harnett gained prominence as a singer in 2011 when, following an open request to her Twitter followers for suggestions and applicants, grime artist Wiley selected Harnett to feature on the single "Walk Away" from his album Chill Out Zone. In 2012, she was featured on the Disclosure track "Boiling" from their EP The Face. She released her debut single, "Got Me", in 2013 via Black Butter Records, and contributed songwriting and guest vocals to Rudimental's debut album, Home. She was also featured on Ryan Hemsworth's solo album Guilt Trips, on the opening track "Small + Lost", and provided uncredited vocals for Kidnap Kid's single "So Close".

Her debut EP, N.O.W., was released in August 2014 through 333 Records; it includes the single "No Other Way", which The Guardian named track of the week. Another track on the EP, "Paradise", received the same honour from The Huffington Post. Snakehips, who are featured on "No Other Way", featured Harnett on their single "Days with You". By late 2014, she was recording her debut album with producer Chris Loco for release on Virgin EMI Records, and was shortlisted for MTV UK's Brand New for 2015 award. The album was originally due for release in 2015 and also features contributions from James Fauntleroy, Chloe Martini, KOZ, TMS, and Two Inch Punch. Its first single, "She Ain't Me", was released in June 2015, followed by "Do It Anyway" in September 2015.

In early 2016, Harnett featured on the single "Never Say Never?" by rapper Nick Brewer. In August, she released the EP Sinead Harnett via Rinse FM; it features collaborations with GRADES, JD. Reid, Kaytranada, and Snakehips, and has produced the singles "If You Let Me" and "Rather Be with You".

In 2020, she played a role in the videogame Five Dates.

== Artistry ==
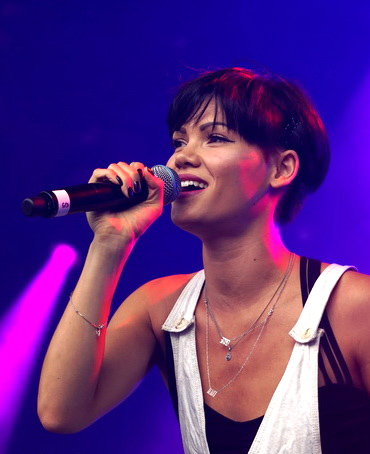
Harnett performing in 2015

Harnett's musical influences include Mariah Carey, Fugees, Lauryn Hill, Dizzee Rascal, Tina Turner and Amy Winehouse. Billboard wrote in 2013 that "Harnett's rich, soulful voice and range has drawn comparisons to Adele, but her recordings are more experimental and contemporary; a brand of jazz-tinged, melodic electronic pop a bit reminiscent of Jessie Ware or Jhené Aiko."

== Discography ==
=== Studio albums ===
Title	Details
Lessons in Love	Released: 20 September 2019; Label: Bad Music; Format: Digital download, streaming
Ready Is Always Too Late	Released: 21 May 2021; Label: Thairish Limited; Format: Digital download, streaming, vinyl
Boundaries	Released: 26 April 2024; Label: Thairish Limited; Format: Digital download, streaming, vinyl

=== EPs ===
Title	Details
Got Me	Released: 28 May 2013; Label: Black Butter; Format: Digital download, streaming
N.O.W	Released: 1 January 2014; Label: Virgin; Format: Digital download, streaming
She Ain't Me	Released: 7 June 2015; Label: Virgin; Format: Digital download, streaming
Sinéad Harnett	Released: 4 August 2016; Label: Rinse; Format: Digital download, streaming
Lessons in Love – Acoustic	Released: 17 April 2020; Label: Bad Music; Format: Digital download, streaming

=== Mixtapes ===
Title	Details
Chapter One	Released: 1 June 2017; Label: Rinse; Format: Digital download, streaming

==== As lead artist ====
List of singles with Sinéad Harnett as main artist
Title	Year	Certifications	Album
"Got Me"	2013		Got Me
"No Other Way" (featuring Snakehips)	2014		N.O.W
"She Ain't Me"	2015		She Ain't Me
"Do It Anyway"	2015		Non-album single
"If You Let Me" (featuring GRADES)	2016	RMNZ: Gold	Sinéad Harnett and Lessons In Love
"Rather Be with You"	2016		Sinéad Harnett
"Still Miss You"	2017		Chapter One
"Unconditional"	2017	BPI: Platinum	Chapter One
"Body"	2018		Non-album singles
"System" (with JD. Reid)	2018		Non-album singles
"Lessons"	2018		Lessons in Love
"By Myself"	2019		Lessons in Love
"Leo Bear"	2019		Lessons in Love
"Pulling Away" (featuring Gallant)	2019		Lessons in Love
"Be the One (Remix)" (featuring Col3trane)	2020		Lessons in Love
"Quarantine Queen"	2020		Non-album single
"Stickin'" (featuring Masego & VanJess)	2020		Ready Is Always Too Late
"Real Deal" (with Maths Time Joy & J Warner)	2020		Non-album single
"Take Me Away" (featuring EarthGang)	2020		Ready Is Always Too Late
"At Your Best (You Are Love)"	2021		Ready Is Always Too Late
"Last Love"	2021		Ready Is Always Too Late
"Hard 4 Me 2 Love You"	2021		Ready Is Always Too Late
"Ready Is Always Too Late"	2021		Ready Is Always Too Late
"Where You Been Hiding"	2021		Ready Is Always Too Late (Deluxe Edition)
"Say Something"	2024		Boundaries
"Thinking Less"	2024		Boundaries
"The Most"	2024		Boundaries
"Burn"	2024		Boundaries
"Foreign"	2026		TBA
"Love You"	2026		TBA

=== Guest appearances ===
Year	Song	Album
2011	"Walk Away" (Wiley featuring Sinéad Harnett)	Chill Out Zone
2012	"Boiling" (Disclosure featuring Sinéad Harnett)	The Face EP
2012	"What's in Your Head" (Disclosure) (uncredited vocals from Sinéad Harnett)	The Face EP
2013	"So Close" (Kidnap Kid) (uncredited vocals from Sinéad Harnett)	Non-album single
2013	"Home" (Rudimental featuring Sinéad Harnett)	Home
2013	"Hide" (Rudimental featuring Sinéad Harnett)	Home
2013	"Baby" (Rudimental featuring MNEK and Sinéad Harnett)	Home
2013	"Small + Lost" (Ryan Hemsworth featuring Sinéad Harnett)	Guilt Trips
2014	"Days with You" (Snakehips featuring Sinéad Harnett)	Non-album single
2015	"Treading on Water" (Rudimental featuring Sinéad Harnett and Will Heard)	We the Generation
2016	"Never Say Never?" (Nick Brewer featuring Sinéad Harnett)	Non-album single
2017	"Love in Ruins" (Gryffin featuring Sinéad Harnett)	Non-album single
2021	"Nah" (Sonny Fodera and KOLIDESCOPES featuring Sinéad Harnett) and "Next 2 U"	Wide Awake
2021	"Phases" (Jax Jones featuring Sinéad Harnett)	Pokémon 25: The Album
