= Word O.K. =

Studio album by Kool A.D.
- Released: March 20, 2014
- Recorded: Oakland, California
- Genres: Hip-hop, alternative hip-hop

Kool A.D. chronology
Not O.K. (2013)	Word O.K. (2014)	O.K. (2015)

Word O.K. is an album by Kool A.D., released March 20, 2014. The album features guest appearances from Sir DZL, Ladybug "Santos Vieira" Mecca of Digable Planets, Toro Y Moi, Talib Kweli, Boots Riley of The Coup, and Mr. Muthafuckin' eXquire.

== Videos ==
Kool A.D. has stated that Word O.K. is a visual album, like Beyoncé's Beyoncé. The video for the song "Open Letter," directed by Nick Knight, who had previously directed Kanye West's "Bound 2" accompanied the release of the album. The videos for "Tight" and "I'm on a Plane" were released later that year on April 21, and May, 9, respectively. On May 28, Kool A.D. released the video to "Word," an animated video in which Kool A.D. imagines himself as a weed-smoking cartoon dog. Stereogum described the video, which Kool A.D. co-directed (along with Teddy O'Connor), as "hysterically perverse in that Fritz The Cat sort of way". Mother Jones magazine described the video as "a three-and-a-half minute, highly NSFW animated short that feels like an acid-fueled journey through a dystopian corporate carnival. It pans smoothly from Bart Simpson wearing a McDonald's tee and smoking a joint to a sexualized, anthropomorphized rabbit doing the same. Yin-yangs, peace signs, and other pop symbols breathe in and out of cartoon orifices." On June 9, 2014, Kool A.D. released the video for the title track, "Word O.K.", which was also directed by Nick Knight.

== Critical reception ==
Professional ratings
Review scores
Source	Rating
Cuepoint (Expert Witness)	A
Pitchfork	6.7/10
The Skinny	4/5 stars

Word O.K. received generally positive reviews from critics. Consequence of Sound called it "more focused of an effort, featuring tighter, doubly succinct examples of Kool’s genre-leaping hijinks". CMJ praised the album, noting that "Kool A.D. hasn’t lost his dry sense of humor and ability to charmingly fit words into places they shouldn’t really fit." Robert Christgau named it the 9th best album of the year in his ballot for the Pazz & Jop critics poll.

== Track listing ==
Word O.K. track listing
No.	Title	Producer(s)	Length
1.	"Open Letter"	Amaze 88	5:20
2.	"I'm on a Plane"	Sha-Leik	5:00
3.	"Tight" (featuring Lakutis and Mr. Muthafuckin' eXquire)	Toro y Moi	3:48
4.	"Naughty by Nature"	Mike Finito	4:24
5.	"Word"	Blesone	3:36
6.	"Look" (featuring Kassa Overall)	Issue	3:43
7.	"The Front" (featuring Toro y Moi and Amaze 88)	Toro y Moi	4:20
8.	"Life and Time" (featuring Del the Funky Homosapien as Sir DZL and Ladybug Mecca as Santos Vieira)	Amaze 88	7:16
9.	"Hickory" (featuring Talib Kweli and Boots Riley)	Amaze 88	4:04
10.	"Special Forces"	Dame Grease	6:44
11.	"Word O.K."	Amaze 88	3:09
