= Haleek Maul =

American rapper

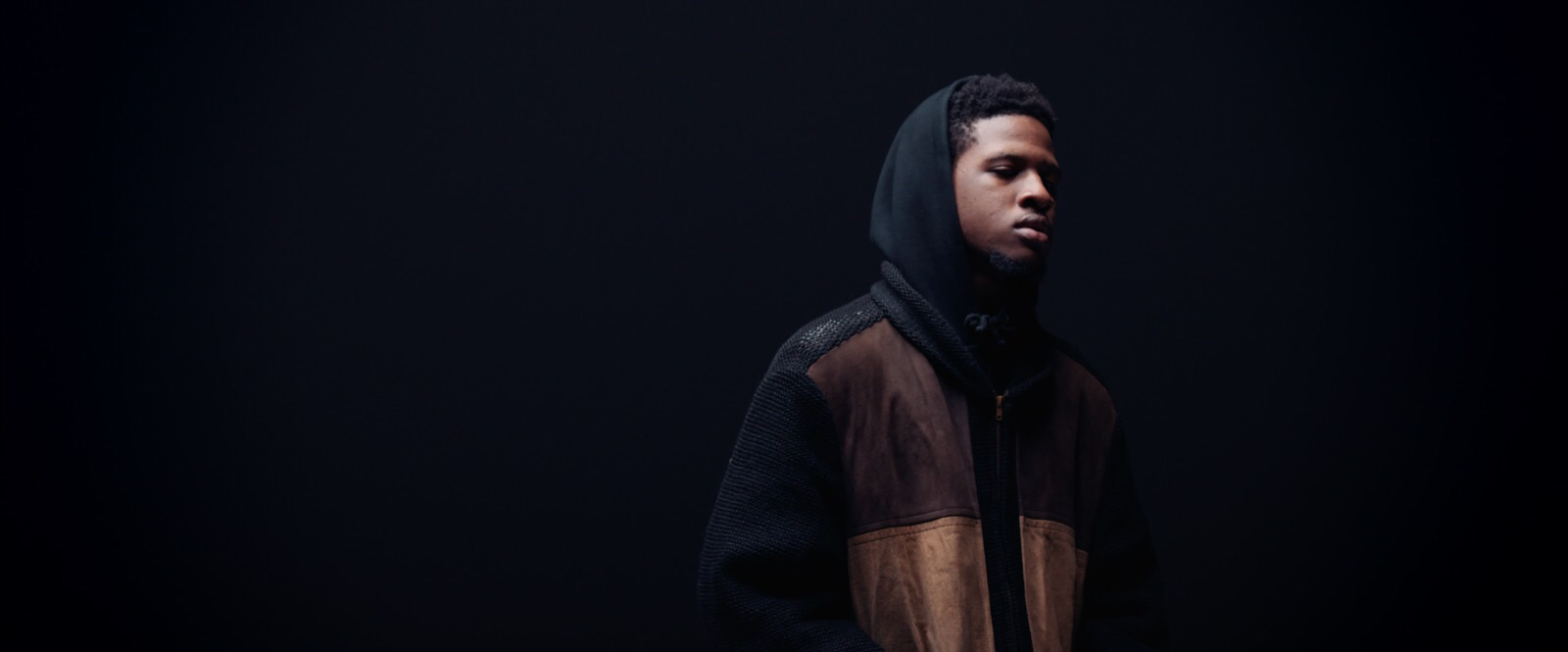

Background information
- Born: Malik Hall; 1996 (age 29–30); Brooklyn, New York, U.S.
- Origin: Barbados
- Genre: Hip-hop
- Occupations: Rapper; record producer
- Years active: 2011–present
- Labels: Merok; Mishka; Lex
- Website: haleekmaul.bandcamp.com

Malik Hall (born in 1996), better known by his stage name Haleek Maul, is an American rapper and record producer. He is a founding member of the collective called On the Tanz. He has collaborated with the likes of Deniro Farrar, Shady Blaze, Hot Sugar, and Saul Williams. Noisey has described him as "the new hustler of horrorcore".

== Early life ==
Haleek Maul was born Malik Hall in Brooklyn, New York. He grew up in Barbados.

== Career ==
In 2012, Haleek Maul released his debut EP, Oxyconteen. Spin named it the "Rap Release of the Week", while Fact placed it at number 48 on the "50 Best Albums of 2012" list. In that year, he also released a collaborative mixtape with Chicago production duo Supreme Cuts, titled Chrome Lips. Clash included it on the "Top 10 Mixtapes of the Year" list.

He released a mixtape, Prince Midas, in 2015, an EP, In Permanence, in 2018, and his debut solo studio album, Errol, in 2020.

== Discography ==
=== Studio albums ===
- Errol (2020)

=== Mixtapes ===
- Chrome Lips (2012) (with Supreme Cuts)
- Prince Midas (2015)

=== EPs ===
- Oxyconteen (2012)
- In Permanence (2018)

=== Singles ===
- "Ceiling Fan" (2019)
- "Halo" (2019)
- "Abyss" (2019)
- "Lucid" (2019)
- "Get2high" (2020)

=== Guest appearances ===
- Deniro Farrar and Shady Blaze - "Cold Blood" from Kill or Be Killed (2012)
- Hot Sugar - "I Don't Wanna B Judged" from Midi Murder (2012)
- Mishka & Rad Reef - "Hyperbolic Chamber Music II" (2013)
- Ryan Hemsworth - "Day/Night/Sleep System" from Guilt Trips (2013)
- Le1f - "Tha Whip" from Fly Zone (2013)
- Black Noise x BK Beats - "RIP" from Nonbelievers (2014)
- P. Morris - "Hot Life / Blood King" from Low (2016)
- Saul Williams - "All Coltrane Solos at Once" from MartyrLoserKing (2016)
- Chino Amobi - "Eigengrau (Children of Hell II)" from Paradiso (2017)
- Dasychira - "Scalaris" from Haptics (2018)
