= Shady Blaze =

American rapper

- Also known as: Velocity
- Born: Ravalle Quinn; November 4, 1987 (age 38)
- Origin: East Oakland, California, U.S.
- Genre: Hip-hop
- Occupations: Rapper; record producer
- Years active: 2009–present
- Label: Green Ova
- Website: shadyblaze.bandcamp.com

Ravalle Quinn (born November 4, 1987), better known by his stage name Shady Blaze, is an American rapper from East Oakland, Oakland, California. He is a member of the Green Ova crew, alongside Squadda B, Mondre M.A.N., Dope G, and TLS. He has collaborated with Ryan Hemsworth, Main Attrakionz, Friendzone, and Deniro Farrar.

== Career ==
In 2011, Shady Blaze released a collaborative album with the producer Ryan Hemsworth, titled Distorted. In 2012, he released his solo mixtape, The Grind, Hustle & Talent.

In 2012, he released a collaborative album with the rapper Deniro Farrar, titled Kill or Be Killed. It was produced by Ryan Hemsworth, Friendzone, and Keyboard Kid, among others. Impose included it on the "Best Music of October 2012" list. Stereogum placed it at number 39 on the "Top 40 Rap Albums of 2012" list.

In 2013, Shady Blaze's song, "Rest in Peace R.J.", was included on Spin's "Rap Songs of the Week" list. In that year, he released his solo albums, The 5th Chapter and Green Ova's Most Hated.

== Style and influences ==
Stereogum has described him as "a Twista/Bone Thugs-style fast-rap specialist who goes all melodiously mile-a-minute over blissed-out cloud-rap beats".

== Personal life ==
Quinn's infant son, R.J., died on March 22, 2013, shortly after his 23 day premature birth. Shortly after, Quinn released "Rest in Peace R.J." three days after as a tribute. The loss influenced his 2013 album The 5th Chapter.

== Discography ==
=== Studio albums ===
- The Shady Bambino Project (2011) (with Squadda B)
- Shady Business (2011)
- Rappers Ain't $#!% Without a Producer (2011)
- Distorted (2011) (with Ryan Hemsworth)
- Blessed or Cursed (2011)
- Kill or Be Killed (2012) (with Deniro Farrar)
- The Anomaly of Hip Hop (2012)
- The 5th Chapter (2013)
- Green Ova's Most Hated (2013)
- Shady Hxvrt (2014) (with Blvckhxvrt)
- Shady Bambino 2 (2021)

=== EPs ===
- I (2013) (with Spadez)
- II (2013) (with Spadez)
- III (2013) (with Spadez)
- IV (2013) (with Spadez)

=== Mixtapes ===
- Shady Blaze Mixtape #1 (2009)
- Shady Blaze Mixtape #2 (2009)
- Shady World Mixtape (2009)
- Real TV (2010) (with Thizzle Jones)
- Loyalty & Royalty (2010) (with MondreM.A.N.)
- The Grind, Hustle & Talent (2012)
- Kill or Be Killed (The Prequel) (2012) (with Deniro Farrar)

=== Singles ===
- "Follow Me" (2011)
- "Green Ova to the Top" (2012) (with Main Attrakionz)
- "Glass" (2012) (with Spadez)
- "C5 Money Hype" (2013)
- "Call 'Em Out" (2013) (with Spadez)
- "Rest in Peace R.J." (2013)
- "What's Good?" (2013) (with Spadez)
- "That's Koo" (2013) (with Natho)
- "Pitch Black" (2014) (with Spadez and Pepperboy)

=== Guest appearances ===
- Main Attrakionz – "Luther on Paywall" from SMC V1: Zombies on tha Turf (2009)
- Squadda B – "2 the Maxxx" from December 2 Remember (2009)
- Thizzle Jones – E.S.O Boiy (2010)
- Main Attrakionz – "Intro A" from Best Duo Ever: The Greentape (2010)
- Thizzle Jones – "Shady Skit" from Gorrilla Muzik (2011)
- Main Attrakionz – "Eightball" from Chandelier (2011)
- Aaron Cohen – "The Coldest" from Crack (2011)
- L.W.H. – "All in Your Hands" from The Tape Hiss Hooligan (2011)
- Squadda B – "Down" and "Van Halen" from Back Sellin Crack (2011)
- Friendzone – "Near", "Stratus" and "Change" from Kuchibiru Network 2 (2011)
- Sortahuman – "Never Gonna Land" from Stonergang (2011)
- DK All Day – "A & P (Intro)" from Addictions & Prescriptions (2011)
- Deniro Farrar – "Faith in Something" and "Prescription" from Destiny Altered (2012)
- Beautiful Lou – "Don't Worry" from Sumone 2 B Young With (2012)
- Mishka & Rad Reef – "Hyperbolic Chamber Music" (2012)
- Spadez – "Go to Work" (2012)
- Western Tink – "That Lyfe" from Chillin' Like a Civilian (2012)
- Zachg – "Ghost Pussy Money" from Peace Mettle (2012)
- Supreme Cuts & Haleek Maul – "Testify" from Chrome Lips (2012)
- 100s – "Another 1 Goes Down" from Ice Cold Perm (2012)
- BK Beats & PBZ – "Soul Fly (Remix)" from Time Is of the Essence (2012)
- Main Attrakionz – "Wings" from Bossalinis & Fooliyones (2012)
- Squadda B – "Then the Cloud Came" from Northside Bad Guy (2012)
- Aaron Cohen – "Lie, Cheat & Steal" from Murk (2012)
- Hot Sugar – "Steady Movin'" from Midi Murder (2012)
- Mondre M.A.N. – "G.O.D. G.O.S.", "L.O.D. Gone Drop" and "Cold Life" from Check tha Forcast (2013)
- Friendzone – "Do or Die" and "Green World" from Kuchibiru Network 3 (2013)
- N-Pire Da Great – "11-9" from Legends Never Die (2013)
- Squadda B – "Higher" from Triple F.A.T. Goose (2013)
- Mondre M.A.N. – "March Nigga Step", "NYC Interlude" and "Wintertime" from Cloudd Packk (2013)
- Noah23 – "Do It Up" from Lotus Deities (2013)
- Western Tink x Beautiful Lou – "Made Man" from Mobbin' No Sobbin' (2013)
- Mishka & Rad Reef – "Hyperbolic Chamber Music II" (2013)
- Pepperboy – "Another Day" from Str8 Off the Block 5: Really Real (2013)
- LaJIT – "That's Life" from Blue Sun (2013)
- Main Attrakionz x Tynethys – "On 1" from Main Attrakionz x Tynethys (2013)
- Beautiful Lou – "Truth of the Matter" (2013)
- Mondre M.A.N. – "Git Stupid Rich" and "Atta Boy" from They Say I Struggle Rap (2013)
- Woof – "White Roses" from The Thrill of It All (2013)
- Main Attrakionz – "Da Cloud Skater" from Jeffro (2013)
- Elujay – "Present Tense" from Seasonal Joogs (2013)
- Western Tink & Pepperboy – "Where's the Love" from Bubble Boyz (2013)
- Supa Sortahuman – "Life" from Adventure Time (2013)
- Black Noise x BK Beats – "Most Hated" from Nonbelievers (2014)
- Noah23 – "Another Dimension" from Rare Gems (2014)
- Noah23 – "Lost in the Crowd" from Street Astrology (2014)
- Lil Tofu – "Object" from Soy (2014)
- AJ Suede – "Knowhatimean" from Gold and Earth (2015)
- Mondre M.A.N. – "Believe" from The Withdrawal (2015)
- Murder Is Not a Crime – "I'm Good" from MF Dos (2015)
- Celestial Trax – "Stargate" from Stargate (2015)
- Noah23 – "Cant Disguise" from Peacock Angel (2015)
- Main Attrakionz – "Shoot the Dice" and "Two Man Horror Film" from 808s & Dark Grapes III (2015)
- Sortahuman – "Dry" from Sortahuman4Life (2015)
- Green Ova – "Drip" from Seventh Sense (2019)
- Squadda B – "This Is Mind Gone" from Mind Gone (2019)
