= Kool A.D. =

American rapper (born 1983)

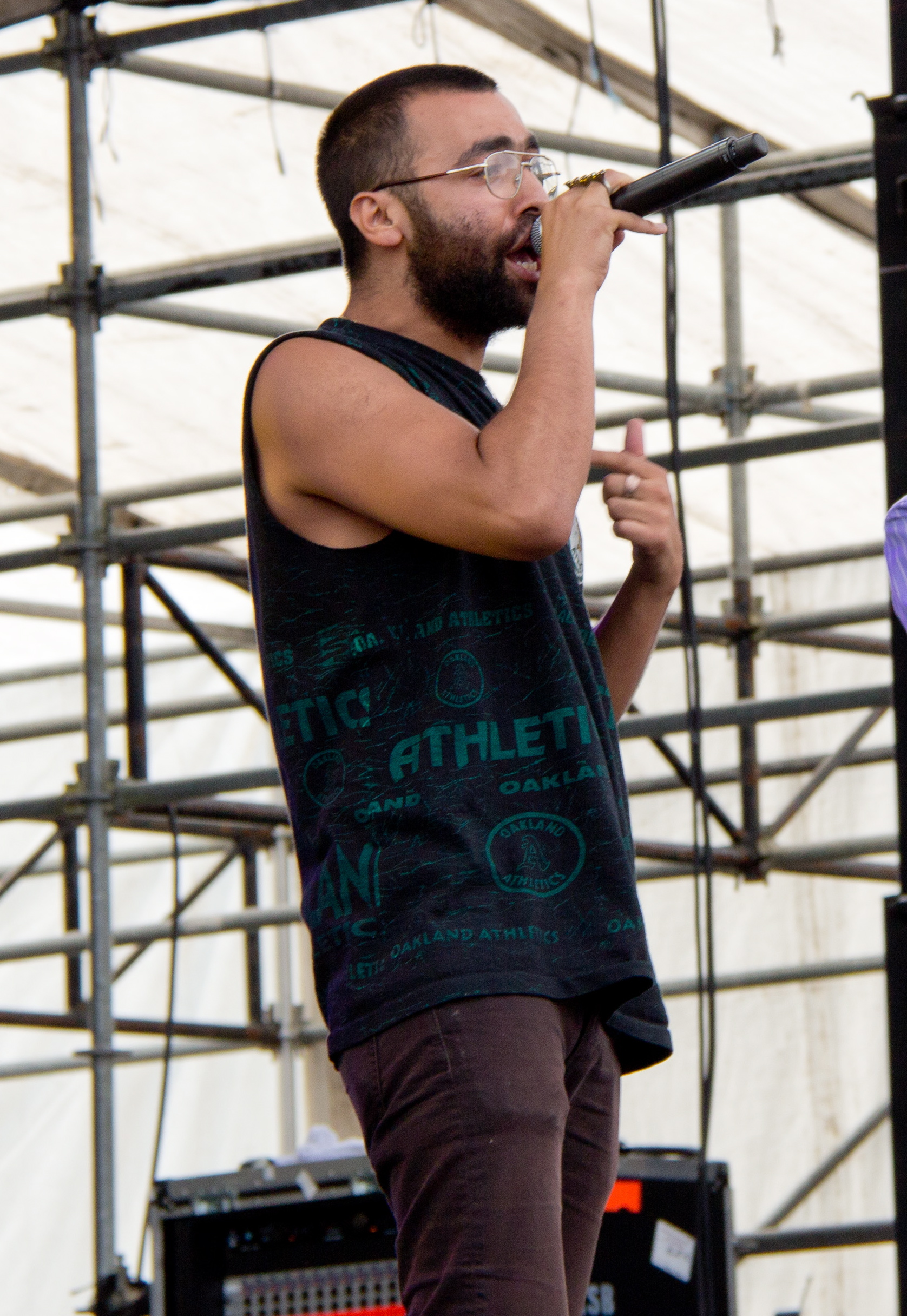
- Kool A.D. performing at Governors Ball in New York City in 2011

Background information
- Also known as: Little Dragon; Big Dragon
- Born: Victor Vazquez; November 16, 1983 (age 43); San Francisco Bay Area, California, U.S.
- Genre: Hip-hop
- Occupations: Rapper; record producer; author; artist
- Years active: 2005–present
- Labels: Veehead; Greedhead
- Website: koolad.bandcamp.com

Victor Vazquez (born November 16, 1983), also known by his stage name Kool A.D., is an American rapper, record producer, author, and artist. He is from the San Francisco Bay Area of California. Vazquez is best known for being a member of the New York-based rap group Das Racist, though he has also been a member of the bands Boy Crisis and Party Animal. Vazquez has also released his own solo material, including numerous mixtapes. Mother Jones magazine described his work as "a thoughtful effort to deconstruct and rearrange cultural objects in ways that challenge our deepest assumptions about society and cultural products".

== Background ==
Vazquez, who is of Afro-Cuban and Italian descent, originally hails from the San Francisco Bay area of California. He attended high school at the Arthur Andersen Community Learning Center in Alameda and college at Wesleyan University in Middletown, Connecticut, where he earned a bachelor's degree in English in 2006. While at Wesleyan, Vazquez played drums for the band La Spanka and formed the group Boy Crisis. At Wesleyan, Vazquez met future Das Racist bandmate Himanshu Suri as well as Andrew VanWyngarden of MGMT.

== Music career ==
=== Boy Crisis ===
While a student at Wesleyan University in 2005, Vazquez formed the group Boy Crisis, originally playing drums, and then later moving to vocals. Although Boy Crisis signed a record deal with B-Unique Records in 2008, B-Unique never released the album.

=== Das Racist ===
During his second year in college, Vazquez served as Himanshu Suri's resident advisor. Following graduation, Vazquez returned to Wesleyan several times to practice with a Boy Crisis bandmate, who still attended the university. It was during this time that he became friends with Suri, and following Suri's graduation, the two moved to New York City, where they shared an apartment.

With Ashok "Dapwell" Kondabolu serving as their hype man, Vazquez and Suri formed the rap group Das Racist. Das Racist first found success on the internet with their 2008 song "Combination Pizza Hut and Taco Bell", and then quickly established themselves within the underground rap scene with their 2010 mixtapes Shut Up, Dude and Sit Down, Man, both of which earned them critical acclaim, the latter of which received Pitchfork's designation of "Best New Music" as well as spawning tours across North America, Europe, and Asia. In 2011, the duo released their first studio album, Relax. After signing a deal with Sony/Megaforce Records in mid-2012 Vazquez then left Das Racist before they could release their first album with Sony.

=== Party Animal ===
Party Animal is a hardcore band in which Vazquez plays the drums. It consists of Vazquez, Loren Moter, and Malosi, all former members of New Earth Creeps – a band Vazquez was a founding member of in high school. In 2011, they played the Northside Festival in Brooklyn, New York, and in early 2012, Das Racist member Dapwell mentioned that Vazquez was working on material with his "other band" Party Animal. Their eponymous debut album was released online on February 28, 2013, and the band toured the U.S. in March and April of the same year. In July 2015, Party Animal released their second album Avant Garbage. They released a video for the song "Saving All My Money (Just to Buy a Gun)" in September 2016.

=== Solo work ===
On January 3, 2012, Vazquez released his debut solo mixtape The Palm Wine Drinkard. The Palm Wine Drinkard, which featured several R&B tracks and other experimental music styles, received mixed reviews from critics. In April 2012, Vazquez released his second solo mixtape, 51, which received positive reviews from critics. In 2012, Vazquez stated that he had three new albums that he was working on. Two of them – titled 19 and 63 (like 51, the albums are named after Bay Area bus lines) – he released as a double-album on February 7, 2013. The albums include collaborations with Pictureplane, Young L, Skywlkr, Keyboard Kid, Trackademicks, Fat Tony, Mike Finito, Lakutis, and Spank Rock, as well as a beat Ad-Rock of the Beastie Boys originally made for Das Racist. Vice described 19 and 63 as "taking the discursive and funny work he was doing with Das Racist and stripping it of any sense of structure or formula, but also work[ing] to free him from the label of 'Dude in Das Racist.'" Pitchfork also praised the mixtapes, calling them "organically avant-garde". Vazquez and Kassa Overall released a collaborative mixtape as Kool & Kass entitled Peaceful Solutions on April 30, 2013. In December 2013, Vazquez released the mixtape Not O.K., composed of tracks that did not make it on his then-forthcoming album, entitled Word O.K. (released in 2014), and featuring guest appearances from Sir DZL and Ladybug "Santos Vieira" Mecca of Digable Planets. In November 2015, Kool A.D. released a 100-song mixtape titled O.K. as a soundtrack to his forthcoming novel O.K., A Novel. 2016 saw a flurry of new releases from Kool A.D. with seven mixtapes coming in the first nine months of year, including two 100-track mixtapes (Zig Zag Zig and Peyote Karaoke).

== Other work ==
=== Visual art ===
Vazquez's representation of "a futuristic utopia where racism doesn't exist" that won him the cartoon-off with Farley Katz

Vazquez is also a visual artist. While working at 826 Valencia in 2006, he drew the cover to Dave Eggers's Some Things You Should Know About Captain Rick. He has also published his own comic, The Continuing Adventures of Boy With a Fish for a Head.

In the summer of 2009, Vazquez responded to The New Yorker cartoonist Farley Katz's poking fun at Das Racist for "Combination Pizza Hut and Taco Bell" by challenging Katz to a "cartoon-off". Katz accepted, and the competition consisted of the two each drawing three cartoons: a day in the life of a rapper, a day in the life of a cartoonist, and a futuristic utopia where racism does not exist. Vazquez submitted the same drawing of domestic slackerdom for the first two, and a person in a Ku Klux Klan hood asking, "What, too soon?" for the third. Rob Harvilla of the Village Voice declared Vazquez the winner, saying he "destroyed" Katz, and Vazquez was widely considered to have won the cartoon-off.

Vazquez also draws pictures and sells them on Instagram and Twitter. His primary medium is Sharpie on paper.

Vazquez has exhibited work in galleries in New York City and Oakland, California.

=== Writing ===
A zine of his writing titled Joke Book was published by Spencer Madsen of Sorry House in February 2013. Praised as "a satirical criticism of our modern society that was both refreshing and thoughtful, as well as uproariously hysterical," the zine sold out in its first run, necessitating a second run three months later.

From July 2015 through February 2016, Kool A.D. wrote a bi-weekly column for Vice about parenting, called "Yeah Baby".

In November 2016, Kool A.D. released a novel, titled O.K., A Novel. Kool A.D. had originally written the novel as a 442-page experimental narrative, with multiple narrators and other unconventional elements such as lists, screenplay-style scripts, dictionary entries, tweets, and fake ad copy, but he scrapped that version and re-wrote the novel.

== Personal life ==
In early 2014, Vazquez married Saba Moeel, known by her stage name Cult Days, a fashion designer and musician he had known since he was 15. They now have a child, whom Vazquez wrote about in his column in Vice magazine. Moeel and Vazquez have since separated and are now divorced, and shortly after the separation, she accused him of sexually assaulting her at a time before they were married. In December 2018, Moeel and three other women spoke with Pitchfork about Vazquez sexually assaulting them between 2006 and 2015 in an article spearheaded by Moeel. Vazquez told Pitchfork that his memory of the incidents differed and that he believed all encounters to have been consensual, but apologized.

== Discography ==
=== Mixtapes ===
- Electric Kool A.D. Acid Test (2006)
- Zoot Fantastic (2009)
- Dipset Trance Party (2010)
- Idiot (2010)
- Dum Shiny (2011)
- Dummo (2011)
- Hyphy Ballads (2011)
- Ah Luh Mee Duh (2011) – beat tape
- Ch-Ch-Ch-Ch-Changes (2011) – beat tape
- Nite Lite (2011)
- Hide Your Love Away (2011)
- Crack Beauty (2011) – beat tape
- The Palm Wine Drinkard (2012)
- 51 (2012)
- 63 (2013)
- 19 (2013)
- Not O.K. (2013)
- Word O.K. (2014)
- O.K. (2015)
- All Love (2016) – EP
- Real Talk (2016) – EP
- Kool A.D. Is Dead (2016)
- Gods of Tomorrow (2016)
- Zig Zag Zig (2016)
- Official (2016)
- Peyote Karaoke (2016)
- Have a Nice Dream (2016)
- Paradiza Inifiniti (2016)
- The Natural (2016)
- Sky Ladder (2017)
- Dope (2017)
- Aztec Yoga (2017)
- No Longer at Ease (2018)
- Per L'Universo (2018)
- Art (2018)
- Critique of Judgement (2018)
- Melancholy Behind Glass (2018)
- Nada Mane (2018)
- La Regle Du Jeu (2018)
- Delusions (2018)
- Beyond the Lovers Paradox into the Perfect Lovers' Infinity (2018)
- Spanish Castle Music (2019)
- Pain, No Pain (2019)
- Ahora Y Siempre (2019)
- The Pacifist Game (2020)
- Notebook of a Return to a Native Land (2020)
- Pax Magnifica (2020)
- Phenomenology of the Spirit (2020)
- Ask the Dust (2020)
- Naturally (2020)
- Who Cares (2020)
- Death 2 Amerikkka (2020)
- Anarchy (2020)
- Finesse Brut (2020)
- Capitalism is an Embarrassment (2020)
- Peace 2 tha Godz (2021)
- Metal Ox Thuggin (2021)
- Automatic Flowers (2021)
- Bells (2021)
- Death to the Fascist Insect (2021)
- Roccoco (2021)
- Theoretical Soup (2021)
- Actual Soup (2021)
- Dubs (2021)
- Life's Great I'm Stoked (2021)
- Y'all Ain't Deserve This Beautiful Art (2021)
- One Hundred Dollar Soup (2021)
- Sit Down Mane (2021)
- Thuggin Hard (2021)
- Shut Up Foo (2021)
- Stone Soup (2021)
- Hip Hop Charm Set (2021)
- Agitprop (2021)
- Art Sux (2021)
- Japanese Cartoons (2021)
- The Raw (2021)
- Man of Letters (2022)
- Water Tiger Soup (2022)
- Good Luck Soup (2022)
- Bicycle Day (2022)
- Art Trappin (2022)
- Art Trippin (2022)
- Servant of the People (2022)
- Lillies of the Filed (2022)
- Kill John Wayne (2022)
- Underground Rap (2022)
- Vision Mistica (2022)
- Smoke Signals (2022)
- Pheasant Season (2023)
- Syncretic Faith (2023)
- Fair Use (2023)
- Art in the Age of Mechanical Reproduction (2023)
- Sho Ya Rite (2023)
- Nag Champa (2023)
- In Time (2024)
- Soul Rebel (2024)
- IDF Drizzy (2024)
- Love & Hip Hop (2024)

=== With Party Animal ===
- Party Animal (2013)
- Avant Garbage (2015)

=== With Boy Crisis ===
- Tulipomania (2009)

=== With Kassa Overall ===
- Peaceful Solutions (2013) (as Kool & Kass)
- Coke Boys 5 (2014) (as Kool & Kass Are... Peaceful Solutions)
- Barter 7 (2015) (as Peaceful Solutions)

=== With New Earth Creeps ===
- The Urge to Kill (2003)
- Overwhelming Hunger (2006)

=== Guest appearances ===
- Lakutis – "I'm Better than Everybody" from I'm in the Forest (2011)
- Sole – "Coke Rap" from Nuclear Winter Volume 2: Death Panel (2011)
- Action Bronson – "Arts & Leisure" from Blue Chips (2012)
- Supreme Cuts & Haleek Maul – "Testify" from Chrome Lips (2012)
- Heems – "Kate Boosh" from Nehru Jackets (2012)
- Angel Haze – "Jungle Fever" from Reservation (2012)
- Mishka & Rad Reef – "Hyperbolic Chamber Music" (2012)
- Toothpaste – "Daytona 900" from 1996 (2012)
- Hot Sugar – "Leverage" from Midi Murder (2012)
- Los Feo Faces – "50 Estate Affair" from City of Mammon (2013)
- Fat Tony – "Hood Party" from Smart Ass Black Boy (2013)
- Knifefight – "Pop Your Bubble" from Knifefight (2013)
- Hot Sugar – "*In & Out*" and "Future Primitive Art School" from Made Man (2013)
- Tecla – "Mayo on the Side" from Bruja (2013)
- Maffew Ragazino – "Jackson Pollock" from Brownsville's Jesus (2014)
- Open Mike Eagle – "Informations" from Dark Comedy (2014)
- King Sterlz – "Holy Sound" from Royalty (2014)
- Milo – "In Gaol" from A Toothpaste Suburb (2014)
- A Tribe Called Red – "All Day" (2015)
- The Shoes – "Der Kreisel" from Broken Bag Mix (2015)
- Creature – "Warhol's Wig" from Torn Together (2015)
- Toro y Moi – "2 Late", "That Night", and "Real Love" from Samantha (2015)
- Lushlife – "This Ecstatic Cult (Zilla Rocca Remix)" from My Idols Are Dead + My Enemies Are in Power (2017)
- Ambrose Akinmusire – Origami Harvest (2018)
- TQX – "Log Off and Live", "Text Me Back", and "Useless Generation" from Global Intimacy (2018)
- Vashy - "Drunk Freestyles in Greece ft. Kool A.D." (2018)
- Freddy Crook - “Championship Blunts ft. Kool A.D. & okaytesla” from Lakeshore Monarch (2021)
