= Boy Crisis =

American indie rock band

- Origin: Brooklyn, New York, United States
- Genres: Indie electronic, alternative
- Years active: 2005–2010
- Label: B-Unique
- Members: Victor Vazquez; Tal Rozen; Lee Pender; Alex Kestner; Owen Roberts
- Website: www.BoyCrisis.net

Boy Crisis was an American band that was influenced by the post-disco–post-punk sound of the early 1980s.

Based in Brooklyn, New York, Boy Crisis consisted of members Tal Rozen, Alex Kestner, Victor Vazquez, Lee Pender, and Owen Roberts. Victor Vazquez is now an MC and was formerly part of the rap group Das Racist.

== History ==
Boy Crisis formed initially as a project between Victor Vazquez, Tal Rozen and Alex Kestner at Wesleyan University in 2005, but they did not start playing shows until Lee Pender joined in 2007. Owen Roberts joined later that year. At Wesleyan, they met MGMT's Andrew VanWyngarden, and they later played shows supporting MGMT live and remixed one of their singles.

In November, 2008, Boy Crisis signed a record deal with B-Unique Records. Their first album was scheduled to be released in October, 2009, with the name Tulipomania; however, due to legal issues with a band by the same name, the album name had to be changed. Due to problems with the record label, the album was never released. Nevertheless, three official music videos were produced: "Dressed to Digress" (directed by Ray Tintori), "The Fountain of Youth" (directed by Jordan Fish), and "L'Homme" (directed by Jovan Todorovic).

== Critical reception ==
While Boy Crisis were the subject of much hype and praise, they also faced strong criticism, including from Richard Hell who declared, "Boy Crisis fucking suck." Amy Phillips of Pitchfork Media also had harsh words for Boy Crisis, calling them "the absolute worst band in the world right now. Seriously." Similarly, Camille Dodero of The Village Voice referred to Boy Crisis as "everything that's wrong about the Lower East Side."

However, Sophie Eggleton of Disappear Here Magazine asserted, "I personally find them a welcome antidote to the dark, bleak realism of some of my current favourite bands." Similarly, Paul Lester of The Guardian wrote that Boy Crisis was "the hottest electronic pop group to emerge from America since, ooh, MGMT at least."

Their album was praised as "spastically seductive" with "all of the tracks [being] bangers" and described as "flawless" with hooks that are "subtle yet stay for a long time" and "plenty of melody."
