= Knifefight (hip-hop duo) =

American hip hop group

- Origin: United States
- Genres: Alternative hip hop
- Years active: 2013–present
- Label: Anticon
- Members: Beans; Mux Mool
- Website: www.anticon.com

Knifefight is a hip hop duo consisting of rapper Beans and producer Mux Mool.

The six-track EP, Knifefight, was released on Anticon on September 3, 2013. It featured guest appearances from Cities Aviv, Kool A.D., and Sub Con. The EP was described by Blake Gillespie of Impose Magazine as "a danger funk that orchestrates a balance between their experimentation of Anti-Pop Consortium and the Ghostly vibes of Planet High School."

== Discography ==
EPs

- Knifefight (2013)
