= Ryan Hemsworth =

Canadian record producer and DJ

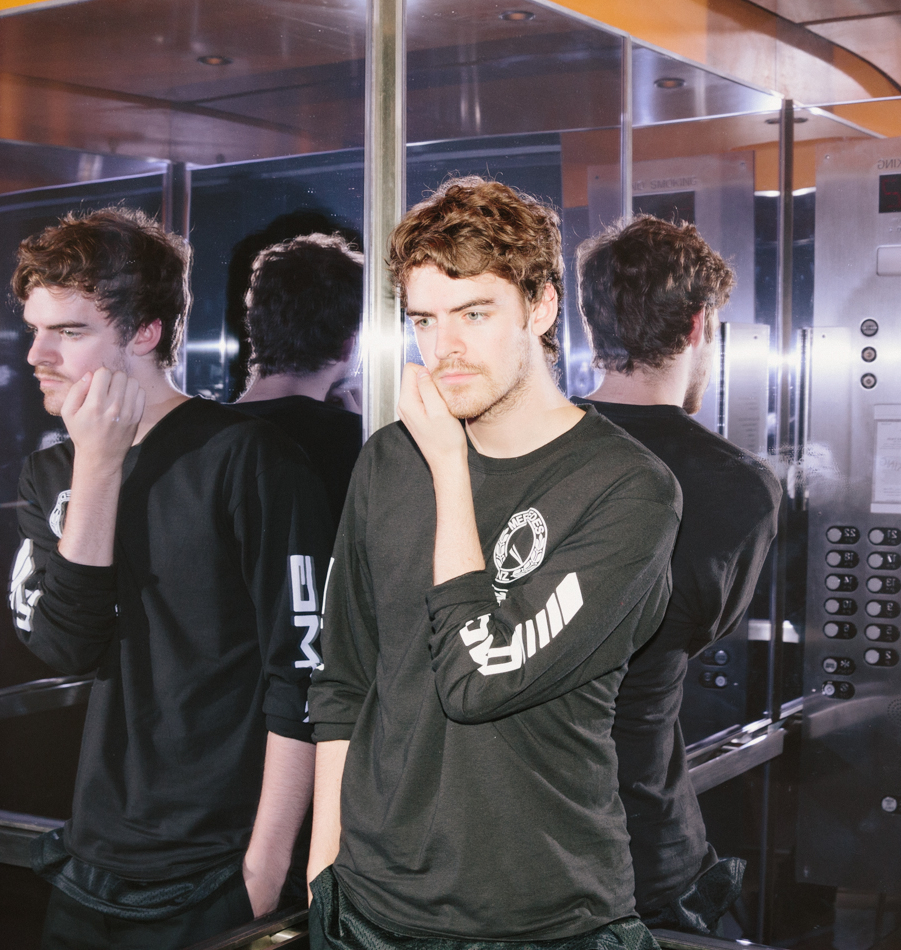
- Ryan Hemsworth in 2014

Background information
- Born: 23 April 1990 (age 36)
- Origin: Halifax, Nova Scotia, Canada
- Genres: Electronic; hip-hop
- Occupations: Record producer; DJ
- Years active: 2010–present
- Labels: Wedidit; Last Gang Records; Secret Songs
- Website: www.ryanhemsworth.com

Ryan Hemsworth (born 23 April 1990) is a Canadian record producer and DJ. He specialises in electronic music and sampling. He has produced tracks for Tinashe, Tory Lanez, Mitski, and E-40.

== Biography ==
Raised in Halifax, Nova Scotia, Hemsworth attended University of King's College, where he studied journalism.

In 2011, Hemsworth released a collaborative album with Shady Blaze, titled Distorted. His 2013 album, Guilt Trips, was released by Last Gang Records. It won the 2014 Juno Award for Electronic Album of the Year. In 2014, he released an album, Alone for the First Time, which was placed at number 3 on CMJ's "30 Best Albums of 2014" list. In 2015, he self-released a collaborative EP with Lucas, titled Taking Flight.

== Secret Songs ==
Hemsworth launched his label Secret Songs in 2014. It has since released music from artists across the world including Tennyson, GFOTY, and Kero Kero Bonito. It has also released compilation albums such as shh#ffb6c1 and shh#000000.

== Quarter-Life Crisis ==
In 2020, Hemsworth signed to Saddle Creek under the moniker Quarter-Life Crisis. The self-titled Quarter-Life Crisis EP released December 2020 features Frances Quinlan, Hand Habits, and Claud.

== Discography ==
=== Studio albums ===
- Distorted (2011) (with Shady Blaze)
- Guilt Trips (2013)
- Alone for the First Time (2014)
- Elsewhere (2018)
- Radio Active (with Bodysync, Giraffage) (2022)
- Nutty (2024)

=== Mixtapes ===
- Ryanpack Vol. 1 (2013)
- Ryanpack Vol. 2 (2015)
- Ryanpack Vol. 3 (2020)

=== Extended plays ===
- Cover Yr Shame (2010)
- No Plans (2011)
- A Way (2011)
- Kitsch Genius (2012)
- Last Words (2012)
- Still Awake (2013)
- Taking Flight (2015) (with Lucas)
- Circus Circus (2019) (with Yurufuwa Gang)
- Pout (2020)
- Quarter-Life Crisis (2020) (as Quarter-Life Crisis)

=== Singles ===
- "We Deserve This" (2010) (featuring Chemist, James Valmont and Cop Magnet)
- "Someone to Make You Crazy" (2011) (featuring Jenn Mierau)
- "Day 'n' Nite" (2013) (with Liz)
- "Every Square Inch" (2014) (with Qrion)
- "Gods" (2014) (with UV Boi)
- "Cream Soda" (2014) (with Tomggg)
- "Afterglow" (2015)
- "How It Felt" (2016)
- "Burying the Sun" (2016)
- "Wait" (2016) (featuring Keaton Henson and Mitski)
- "In the Sky" (2016) (featuring Nebu Kiniza)
- "Commas" (2016) (featuring Adamn Killa)
- "Holy" (2016) (featuring RYAN Playground and Swim Good Now)
- "Hunnid" (2017) (featuring E-40 and Yakki)
- "Four Seasons" (2018) (featuring NewAgeMuzik)
- "Think About U" (2018) (featuring Joji)
- "Special Girl" (2018) (featuring SK and Tomggg)
- "Tiny Tea Room" (2019) (with Wednesday Campanella)
- "New Life / Sun Up" (2020)
- "Cold Feet" (2020) (with Eden)
- "Keep Touch" (2020) (featuring Leland Whitty)

=== Productions ===
- A-Y – "Fall Back" from Fall Back (2010)
- Shady Blaze – "Dreamin", "Hood Nigga" and "Put the Speed On" from Rappers Ain't $#!% Without a Producer (2011)
- Vulkan the Krusader – "Industry People" from V for Vendetta (2011)
- Deniro Farrar – "Faith in Something", "Rich Ass Nigga", "No Games" and "Dublin" from Destiny Altered (2012)
- Shady Blaze – "Celebration" and "Faith in Something" from The Grind, Hustle & Talent (2012)
- Mishka & Rad Reef – "Hyperbolic Chamber Music" (2012)
- Aaron Cohen – "Wasting Time" from Murk (2012)
- Deniro Farrar and Shady Blaze – "43 Hours In", "Fallen Soldiers", "Cold Blood" and "Madonna" from Kill or Be Killed (2012)
- Hollywood Squadda – "Charles Glover" from My Room Look Like a Mall (2012)
- Shady Blaze – "51/50" from The Anomaly of Hip Hop (2012)
- Sole – "Letter to a Young Rapper" from A Ruthless Criticism of Everything Existing (2012)
- Deniro Farrar – "Big Tookie" from The Patriarch (2013)
- Piu Piu – "W O" from Nightintale (2013)
- Starlito – "Again" and "Can't Get Over You" from Fried Turkey (2013)
- Deniro Farrar – "Separate" from The Patriarch II (2013)
- Kitty, Sasha Go Hard and Tink – "Spotless" from Druture Presents: Out of Towner Vol.1 (2013)
- Abgohard and Slater – "GTA" from Rich Yung Pimp (2014)
- The Underachievers – "Incandescent" from Cellar Door: Terminus ut Exordium (2014)
- Swet Shop Boys – "Benny Lava" from Swet Shop (2014)
- Tory Lanez – "Mama Told Me" from Lost Cause (2014)
- Tinashe – "Wrong" from Amethyst (2015)
- Jose Guapo and Hoodrich Pablo Juan – "Juggin' Dat Pack" from Million Dollar Plugs 2 (2016)
- Cadell – "Off White" from London: The Album (2017)
- Adamn Killa – "Separate" from I Am Adamn (2017)
- Joji – "R.I.P." from Ballads 1 (2018)
- Jamie Isaac – "Melt" and "Drifted" from (04:30) Idler (2018)
- Yurufuwa Gang – "Hybrid" and "Speed" from Mars Ice House II (2018)
- Riri – "Luv Luv" (2019)
- Lightshow – "Everything I Came For" from If These Walls Could Talk 2 (2019)
- Ambré – "fubu" from Pulp (2019)
- Jung Jin Hyeong – "Emergency" from SOAR (2019)
- Squadda B – "Everything" from The Wonderful World of Squadda B (2025)

=== Remixes ===
- Kanye West – "All of the Lights" (2011)
- Main Attrakionz – "Perfect Skies" (Seiken Densetsu mix) (2011)
- Grimes – "Genesis" (2012)
- Main Attrakionz – "8ball" (2012)
- Toboggan – "Bermuda" (2012)
- Frank Ocean – "Thinkin Bout You" (2012)
- Tinashe – "Boss" (2012)
- Bruiser Brigade – "Errthang" (2012)
- Jenn Mierau – "A Little Blue" (2012)
- Mikky Ekko – "Pull Me Down" (2012)
- Lianne La Havas – "Age" (2012)
- Monolithium – "Bounce 4 Life" (2012)
- The 1975 – "Sex" (2012)
- Chaos in the CBD – "Never Ending" (2012)
- Mike Din – "Losing You" (2012)
- Cat Power – "Manhattan" (2013)
- Rhye – "Open" (2013)
- Lana Del Rey – "Summertime Sadness" (2013)
- Outkast – "Return of the G" (2013)
- Backstreet Boys – "Show Me the Meaning of Being Lonely" (2013)
- Migos – "Bando" (2013)
- Birdy Nam Nam – "(The Golden Era) Of El Cobra Discoteca" (2013)
- ASAP Rocky – "Thuggin' Noise" (2013)
- Lorde – "Ribs" (2013)
- Beyoncé – "Mine" (2013)
- Disclosure – "F for You" (2013)
- Sinead Harnett – "No Other Way" (2014)
- Wave Racer – "Streamers" (2014)
- Mitski – "Francis Forever" (2015)
- Club cheval – "Discipline" (2015)
- Skylar Spence – "Can't You See" (2015)
- Nothing – "Nineteen Ninety Heaven" (2016)
- Joji – "Will He" (2018)
- Rina Sawayama – "Cherry" (2018)
- ILLENIUM – "Every Piece of Me (with Echos)" (2020)
- Alina Baraz – More Than Enough (2020)
- Francis Quinlan – Lean (2021)

== Awards ==
- 2014: Juno Award for Electronic Album of the Year
- 2014: SOCAN Breakout Award
