= Deniro Farrar =

American rapper

- Born: Qushawan Farrar; June 18, 1987 (age 39); Charlotte, North Carolina, U.S.
- Genre: Hip-hop
- Occupation: Rapper
- Years active: 2010–present
- Labels: Black Flag; Vice; Warner Bros.
- Website: denirofarrar.bandcamp.com

Dante Qushawan Farrar (born June 18, 1987), better known by his stage name Deniro Farrar, is an American rapper from Charlotte, North Carolina. He has collaborated with other artists such as Ryan Hemsworth, Shady Blaze, and Flosstradamus. His voice was described by The Fader as "an eerily calm rasp that never leaves the emotional range of fuming mad".

== Early life ==
Deniro Farrar was born in Charlotte, North Carolina on June 18, 1987. He dropped out of school in the 9th grade. He grew up listening to Tupac, Three 6 Mafia, Luther Vandross, Kris Kross, Lauryn Hill, and DMX.

== Career ==
In 2010, Deniro Farrar released Feel This on Black Flag Records. In 2012, he released Destiny Altered. Later that year, he released a collaborative album with Shady Blaze, titled Kill or Be Killed. Impose included it on the "Best Music of October 2012" list. Stereogum placed it at number 39 on the "Top 40 Rap Albums of 2012" list. In that year, he also released Cliff of Death, an EP entirely produced by Blue Sky Black Death. It featured guest appearances from Child Actor and Nacho Picasso.

In 2013, he released two solo albums: The Patriarch and The Patriarch II. In that year, he announced a joint venture record deal with Vice Records and Warner Bros. Records. He released the Rebirth EP in 2014.

In 2015, he released Cliff of Death II, a collaborative EP with producer Young God. In 2016, he released two EPs: Mind of a Gemini and Red Book, Vol. 1. In 2017, he released two EPs: Guilty Until Proven Innocent and Mind of a Gemini II. He released the Re-Up EP in 2019.

== Discography ==
=== Studio albums ===
- Feel This (2010)
- Destiny Altered (2012)
- Kill or Be Killed (2012) (with Shady Blaze)
- The Patriarch (2013)
- The Patriarch II (2013)

=== Compilation albums ===
- Get to Know Deniro Farrar (2013)

=== EPs ===
- Cliff of Death (2012) (with Blue Sky Black Death)
- Rebirth (2014)
- Cliff of Death II (2015) (with Young God)
- Mind of a Gemini (2016)
- Red Book, Vol. 1 (2016)
- Guilty Until Proven Innocent (2017)
- Mind of a Gemini II (2017)
- Re-Up (2019)
- Sole Food (2020)
- Exhibit Q (2020)

=== Singles ===
- "I'm Ill" (2010) (with A. Moss)
- "100 Down the Highway" (2010)
- "Propellers" (2010) (with A. Moss and Dow Jones)
- "Big Tookie" (2012)
- "The Reasons" (2012)
- "Separate" (2012)
- "Fears" (2013)
- "Feel Right" (2013)
- "Social Status" (2013)
- "High Tide" (2013)
- "Torn Love" (2013)
- "Death or Forever" (2013) (with Child Actor)
- "Nostalgia" (2015)
- "Trap Hall of Fame" (2019) (with Jayway Sosa)
- "King" (2020) (with Trent the HOOLiGAN)

=== Guest appearances ===
- Dow Jones - "Straight No Chaser" from The Lyrics and Liquor EP (2010)
- Flosstradamus - "Look at the Sky" (2012)
- Lyle Horowitz - "Ridiculous" from Redamancy (2012)
- Shady Blaze - "Faith in Something" from The Grind, Hustle & Talent (2012)
- Joel Verdad - "Church on Traxxx" from Adolescent Theory (2012)
- Lyle Horowitz - "Silencio" from A Good Clean Fight (2012)
- Supreme Cuts & Haleek Maul - "The Dummy" from Chrome Lips (2012)
- Grimes - "Genesis (Ryan Hemsworth Remix)" (2012)
- BK Beats & PBZ - "Soul Fly (Remix)" from Time Is of the Essence (2012)
- Shady Blaze - "51/50" and "Insane" from The Anomaly of Hip Hop (2012)
- Sweatson Klank - "Fuck & Fight" from You, Me, Temporary (2013)
- Spadez x Shady Blaze - "Go to Work" and "On My Block" from III (2013)
- Spadez - "City on My Back" (2013)
- Woof - "My Block" from The Thrill of It All (2013)
- Rich Kidd - "It's Real Like That" from We on Some Rich Kidd Shit Vol. 7: The People's Champ (2013)
- Blue Sky Black Death - "Keys" (2013)
- Black Noise x BK Beats - "Nonbelievers" and "Can't Get Sleep" from Nobelievers (2014)
- Lushlife + CSLSX - "Incantation" from Ritualize (2016)
- Machinedrum - "Stone Age" from Psyconia (2021)
