= Trackademicks =

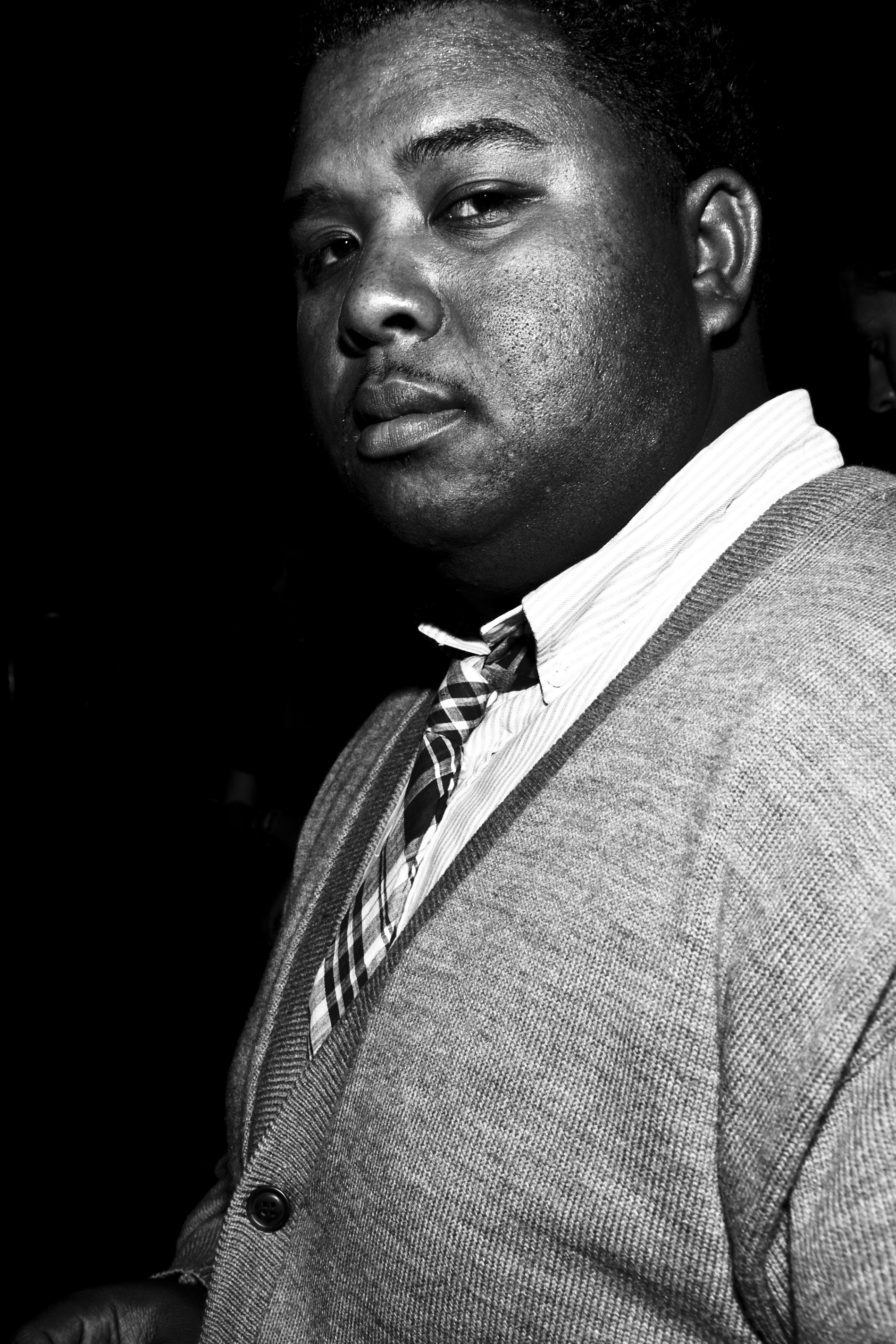
- Trackademicks after his performance at The Independent in San Francisco, July 2009

Background information
- Also known as: The Cool Collar Scholar
- Born: Jason Valerio
- Genres: Rap, Electronic
- Occupation: Musician
- Instruments: Vocals, keyboards, synth
- Label: Fool's Gold Records
- Member of: Honor Roll Crew
- Website: http://www.trackademia.com

Trackademicks is an American Hip-Hop artist. He was born and raised in Alameda, California and is also part of the San Francisco-Bay Area music collective, the Honor Roll Crew.

== Biography ==
Trackademicks was born in Alameda, California, to a Filipino American father and African American mother. He began playing the saxophone in fourth grade and continued throughout high school. During high school, he joined Youth Radio where he met the founding members of the Honor Roll. Trackademicks began making music while attending the University of San Francisco. After graduating, he began to work with Mistah F.A.B., whom he produced six songs for on the rapper's sophomore release, Son Of A Pimp, released in May 2005. In 2006 he produced an unofficial remix of "Tell Me When To Go" by Bay Area rapper E-40, garnering widespread popularity.

In 2009 Trackademicks was featured in the song "Gary is a Robot" featuring Amp Live & Mr. Micro. The video was shot and released in the same year.

Trackademicks has collaborated with many other artists including Kamaiyah, J*Davey, Kid Sister, Kool A.D., Phonte of Little Brother and grammy nominated Foreign Exchange, Lyrics Born, Iamsu! from HBK Gang and Teedra Moses.

He has also done remixes for notable artists such as Zero 7, Platinum Pied Pipers, Yummy Bingham, Chromeo, and The Editors.

== Discography ==
- The [Re]Mixtape (2005)
- The Spring Progress Report (2006)
- The [Re]Mixtape Vol. 2 (2007)
- "Enjoy What You Do"/ b/w "Topsidin'" (12" Single, 2009)
- The [Re]Mixtape Vol. 3 (2010)
- State Of The Arts (2011)
- Fresh Coastin' (2011)
- Cherry 2000 (2011)
- Breeze Mobbin' (2012)
- Secret of My Success (2014)
- HNRL presents 'The Champagne Room' (2014)
- 7th Heaven (2015)
- The [Re]Mixtape Vol. 4 (2016)
