= Wild Water Kingdom (mixtape) =

Mixtape by Heems
- Released: November 14, 2012
- Genre: Hip-hop
- Length: 61:24
- Label: Greedhead
- Producers: B. Official; Harry Fraud; Crookers; Keyboard Kid; Yorissey Blkhrts; Beautiful Lou; Mike Finito; Le1f; Lushlife; Steel Tipped Dove; Shaleik

Heems chronology
| Nehru Jackets (2012) | Wild Water Kingdom (2012) | Eat Pray Thug (2015) |

Wild Water Kingdom is the second solo mixtape by American rapper Heems. It was released on Heems' own Greedhead Music label on November 14, 2012.

== Background ==
Wild Water Kingdom features production from Harry Fraud, Keyboard Kid, Crookers, Beautiful Lou, Le1f, and Lushlife. Guests on Wild Water Kingdom include Childish Gambino and Lakutis. Heems contrasted the style of Wild Water Kingdom with that of Nehru Jackets, noting that on Nehru Jackets, "the beats were aggressive and the bars were laid back. This time, the beats are a little laid back and the bars are aggressive."

== Critical reception ==
Professional ratings
Aggregate scores
| Source | Rating |
|---|---|
| Metacritic | 71/100 |
Review scores
| Source | Rating |
| Arizona Daily Wildcat | 4/5 stars |
| Consequence of Sound | 2.5/5 stars |
| Impact Magazine | 3.5/5 stars |
| MSN Music (Expert Witness) | A− |
| Pitchfork | 7.2/10 |
| Rolling Stone | 3.5/5 stars |
| Spin | 6/10 |

At Metacritic, which assigns a weighted average score out of 100 to reviews from mainstream critics, Wild Water Kingdom received an average score of 71, based on 6 reviews, indicating "generally favorable reviews".

Jonah Bromwich of Pitchfork stated that "Wild Water Kingdom is the most substantial solo project full-length associated with Das Racist to date, because it merges the academic underpinnings of Heems' ideas with thoroughly listenable rap music."

== Track listing ==
| No. | Title | Producer(s) | Length |
|---|---|---|---|
| 1. | "WWK Intro" | B. Official | 3:35 |
| 2. | "Cowabunga Gnarly" | Harry Fraud | 3:06 |
| 3. | "Third Thing" | Crookers | 3:10 |
| 4. | "Death Is Not an Option" (featuring Bodega Bamz and Lakutis) | Keyboard Kid | 4:10 |
| 5. | "Wild Water Kingdom" | Harry Fraud | 5:43 |
| 6. | "Himanshu Freestyles" | Keyboard Kid | 2:31 |
| 7. | "Let It Go" (featuring Cee Gee) | Keyboard Kid | 3:54 |
| 8. | "Killing Time" | Yorissey Blkhrts | 3:01 |
| 9. | "Running Thru the Jungle" | Beautiful Lou | 2:29 |
| 10. | "Half Pint" | Mike Finito | 2:50 |
| 11. | "WOYY" | Mike Finito | 2:26 |
| 12. | "Deepak Choppa" | Le1f | 5:41 |
| 13. | "Soup Boys" | Lushlife | 4:10 |
| 14. | "Medium Green Eyes" (featuring Safe) | Steel Tipped Dove | 4:08 |
| 15. | "Tell Me" (featuring Childish Gambino) | Mike Finito | 2:59 |
| 16. | "Adina Howard" | Shaleik | 3:24 |
| 17. | "Combat Jack Show Freestyle" | | 4:06 |
| Total length: | | | 61:24 |
