= Fat Tony (rapper) =

American rapper (born 1988)

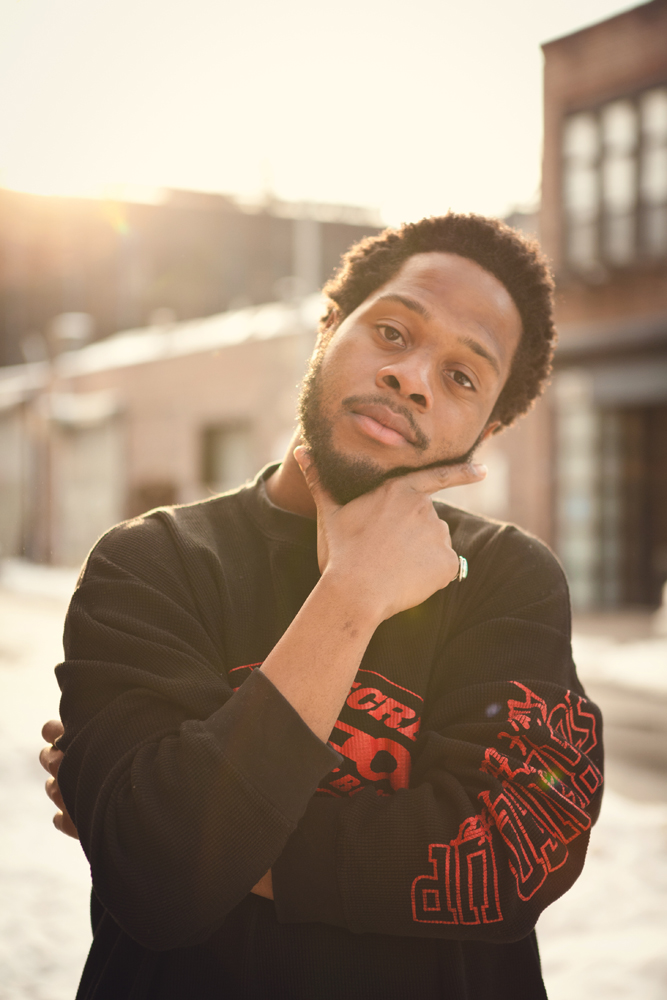
- Fat Tony in 2013

Background information
- Born: Anthony Lawson Jude Ifeanyichukwu Obiawunaotu; March 24, 1988 (age 38)
- Origin: Third Ward, Houston, Texas, U.S.
- Genre: Hip-hop
- Occupation: Rapper
- Instrument: Vocals
- Years active: 2008–present
- Labels: Young One; Don Giovanni; Carpark
- Website: fattonyrap.net

Anthony Lawson Jude Ifeanyichukwu Obiawunaotu (sometimes shortened as Anthony Lawson Obi; born March 24, 1988), better known by his stage name Fat Tony, is a Nigerian-American rapper.

He has been recognized in URB's "Next 1000", a list of emerging new artists anticipated to break through. At the Houston Press Music Awards, he won the Best Underground Hip Hop award in 2008, 2009, and 2010, as well as the Best Solo Rapper award in 2013.

== Early life ==
Fat Tony grew up in the Third Ward area of Houston, Texas. Anthony Onyebuchi Obi, Fat Tony's father, is an engineer, and his mother Johnnie is a housewife. His mother sang opera and exposed him to rock and pop music such as The Beatles and The Rolling Stones. His father is stated to have exposed the artist to acts like Bob Marley and Jimmy Cliff as well as music from his home country, Nigeria. Fat Tony's father, an Igbo, fought in the Biafran War in Nigeria before coming to Houston. Growing up, he became a fan of Nirvana. He stated in an interview that the first album he ever bought was an album from child rap duo Kris Kross whom he was inspired by due to the fact that they were kids. In middle school he formed a rap group with his friends called Simply Throwed. In high school he performed in a rap group called The Low Ends. He continued playing in bands with friends throughout his school days. Fat Tony attended Carnegie Vanguard High School (Class of 2006) and the University of St. Thomas. He also studied as a communications major at the University of Houston.

== Career ==
Fat Tony's debut studio album, RABDARGAB, was released in 2010. The album's title is a reference to the late 1990s Houston Independent School District campaign ("Read a book, do a report, get a buck") aimed at students to promote literacy by offering $1 to students in exchange for book reports. In 2012, he released a collaborative album with producer Tom Cruz, titled Double Dragon, on Young One Records.

In 2013, he released Smart Ass Black Boy on Young One Records. Produced by Tom Cruz, the album was written in two days and recorded in four days in Los Angeles, California. It was included on the year-end lists by Complex, Houston Press, and Vice.

In 2017, he released MacGregor Park on First One Up. The album's title refers to MacGregor Park in Houston. It was included on the year-end lists by Bandcamp Daily and Houston Press. In 2018, Fat Tony released 10,000 Hours on Don Giovanni Records. Written and recorded in Los Angeles, the album was produced in large part by Hevln. In 2019, Fat Tony served as a host on the nightly live variety show Vice Live on Viceland along with Marie Faustin, Sandy Honig, and Zack Fox.

In 2020, he released a collaborative album with producer Taydex, titled Wake Up, on Carpark Records. On October 23, 2020, he released the album Exotica on Carpark Records. In 2025, he joined the No Music for Genocide movement in protest of Israeli actions in Gaza.

== Style and influences ==
Fat Tony has cited Ramones, Prince, Michael Jackson, Black Flag, Bad Brains, Morrissey, the Smiths, E-40, Jay-Z, Nas, the Notorious B.I.G., Tupac Shakur, UGK, Outkast, DJ Screw, Three 6 Mafia, Mac Dre, Too Short, Aaliyah, R. Kelly, My Bloody Valentine, Nirvana, Rick Rubin, Beastie Boys, Scarface, Devin the Dude, Kilo Ali, Ice Cube, Snoop Dogg, Mannie Fresh, Bikini Kill, Lil B, A Tribe Called Quest, Avril Lavigne and De La Soul as his music influences.

== Personal life ==
His home was destroyed in the 2025 Eaton Fire.

== Discography ==
=== Studio albums ===
- RABDARGAB (2010)
- Double Dragon (2012) (with Tom Cruz)
- Smart Ass Black Boy (2013)
- MacGregor Park (2017)
- House with a Pool (2018) (with Kyle Mabson, as Charge It to the Game)
- 10,000 Hours (2018)
- Wake Up (2020) (with Taydex)
- Exotica (2020)
- I Will Make a Baby in this Damn Economy (2023) (with Taydex)
- Brain Candy (2024) (with Fatboi Sharif)

=== Remix albums ===
- SCREWDARGAB (2011) (with OG Ron C)
- MacGregor Park (Chopnotslop Remix) (2017) (with OG Ron C and DJ Candlestick)

=== Live albums ===
- Live at No Audience (2020)

=== Compilation albums ===
- The Creation of Fat Tony (2009)

=== Mixtapes ===
- RABDARGAB: The EPreview (2010)

=== EPs ===
- Love Life (2008)
- Look (2016) (with P. Morris)
- Urban Hall of Fame (2016) (with Kyle Mabson, as Charge It to the Game)
- Snak Pak (2018) (with Yung Skrrt)
- Full Circle (2018) (with J.Kelr)

=== Singles ===
- "Hood Party" (2013)
- "BKNY (Remix)" (2013)
- "No More" b/w "Love Me" (2014)
- "Sushi" (2015)
- "Dame Un Beso" (2016)
- "Twin Peaks" (2017)
- "Two for One" (2017)
- "Son of God" (2017)
- "Growth Spurt" b/w "Northside Dr." (2018)
- "FWU" (2018)
- "Don't Move" b/w "Can't Stay" (2020)
- "Gambling Man" (Mariachi Remix) (2020)
- "Ain't for Me" (2021)
- "Ain't for Me" (Blockhead Remix) (2020)

=== Guest appearances ===
- SMKA - "'Til It's Gone" and "I'm on Fire" from SMKA: The 808 Experiment Vol. 1 (2008)
- DJ Sly - "Killin' Time" from Beyond It (2009)
- Juiceboxxx - "Boxxx Get Busy" from Journeyman from the Heartland (2010)
- Das Racist - "Luv It Mayne" from Sit Down, Man (2010)
- Tecla - "Beautiful Problems" from Strangers Revisited (2011)
- ASAP Rocky - "Get Lit" from Live. Love. ASAP (2011)
- Tecla - "No Music" from Thanksgiving (2011)
- Hot Sugar - "Leverage" from Midi Murder (2012)
- Big Baby Gandhi - "Lurkin'" from No1 2 Look Up 2 (2012)
- Mishka & Rad Reef - "Hyperbolic Chamber Music" (2012)
- Heems - "Bangles" from Nehru Jackets (2012)
- Antwon - "Laugh Now: Hot Sugar Version" (2013)
- Tecla - "Bed of Roses" and "Mayo on the Side" from Bruja (2013)
- Steel Tipped Dove - "Sprung" from Steel Tipped Dove & a Whole Bunch of Crazy Motherfuckers (2013)
- Kool & Kass - "Burtation" from Peaceful Solutions (2013)
- Weekend Money - "Trapper Keeper" from Freddie Merkury (2014)
- Shy Girls - "Without (Magic Fades Remix)" (2014)
- Donwill & Dash Speaks - "Sixteen Tons" from Don Speaks (2014)
- Kari Faux - "Stainless" from Laugh Now, Die Later (2014)
- Tony Collins - "Take You Home" from Last Night (2014)
- Cakes da Killa - "I Run This Club Remix" from I Run This Club (2014)
- Puzzle - "All the Best" from Tighten the Reins (2017)
- Black Midi - "Jam" and "bmbmbm" from Black Midi Live in the USA (2020)

== See also ==
- Culture of Houston
- History of African Americans in Houston
- List of Nigerian Americans
