= Three Seashells =

Mixtape by Lakutis
- Released: February 20, 2014
- Genre: Hip-hop
- Length: 24:25
- Label: Greedhead Music
- Producers: Black Noise; Steel Tipped Dove; Hghwnd; Spvce; Bill Ding; Sicksentz; Hot Sugar

Lakutis chronology
I'm in the Forest (2011)	Three Seashells (2014)

Three Seashells (sometimes stylized as 3 Seashells) is a mixtape by American rapper Lakutis. It was released on Greedhead Music on February 20, 2014. It features a guest appearance from DVS. Music videos were created for "Too Ill for the Law", "Jesus Piece", and "Body Scream".

== Critical reception ==
Professional ratings
Review scores
Source	Rating
Consequence of Sound	B
Impose	favorable
Pitchfork	6.7/10
Potholes in My Blog	3.5/5 stars

Pat Levy of Consequence of Sound gave the mixtape a grade of B, saying, "Despite the record's relatively short runtime, so much humor, angst, and pure bohemian attitude are melded together with admirable results." Zach Kelly of Pitchfork gave the mixtape a 6.7 out of 10, describing it as "a record that suggests the person who made it spends more time listening to rap music than actually making it, a paranoid loner with a baggie of bad acid trying to translate a stack of classic 90s New York hip-hop records in his basement." He added, "Lakutis' real strong suit is the way he raps, punctuating words with a visceral intensity usually reserved for the frontman of a hardcore band, his flow almost functioning as a percussive element." Alexander Tulett of Junkee commented that "Lakutis' delivery is sharp and emotive, and his beat choice is impeccable."

It was listed as Stereogum's "Mixtape of the Week" on February 26, 2014. Tom Breihan of Stereogum placed it at number 17 on the "40 Best Rap Albums of 2014" list.

== Track listing ==
No.	Title	Producer(s)	Length
1.	"What the Fuck"	Black Noise	1:42
2.	"Animal"	Steel Tipped Dove	3:01
3.	"Jesus Piece"	Steel Tipped Dove	3:12
4.	"Too Ill for the Law"	Hghwnd	2:37
5.	"Mumra"	Spvce	1:20
6.	"Skit 1"		0:07
7.	"Chinese Slippers"	Bill Ding	2:08
8.	"Black Swann" (featuring DVS)	Sicksentz	2:40
9.	"Skit 2"		0:14
10.	"Body Scream"	Hot Sugar	3:06
11.	"Skeleton"	Bill Ding	2:11
12.	"Dope as Fuck"	Bill Ding	2:07
Total length:			24:25
