= Hot Sugar's Cold World =

- Directed by: Adam Bhala Lough
- Written by: Adam Bhala Lough; Hunter Stephenson
- Produced by: Adam Bhala Lough; Hunter Stephenson
- Starring: Hot Sugar
- Cinematography: Patrice Lucien Cochet; Chris Messina
- Edited by: Elliot Dickerhoof; Aaron Morris
- Music by: Hot Sugar
- Production company: Rough House Pictures
- Release dates: March 16, 2015 (SXSW); November 6, 2015 (United States)
- Running time: 87 minutes
- Country: United States
- Language: English

Hot Sugar's Cold World is a 2015 American documentary film about musician Hot Sugar (Nick Koenig), directed by Adam Bhala Lough. It is executive produced by David Gordon Green, Jody Hill, and Danny McBride. It features appearances from Neil deGrasse Tyson, Martin Starr, Jim Jarmusch, and former members of Das Racist.

The film premiered at South by Southwest on March 16, 2015. It was released in theaters on November 6, 2015. It received an honorable mention at the 2015 Hot Docs Canadian International Documentary Festival.

== Plot ==
The film follows the life of musician Nick Koenig, better known as Hot Sugar. He creates his music by using the sounds around him. Having broken up with rapper girlfriend Kitty, he goes to Paris in search of unique sounds.

== Cast ==
- Hot Sugar
- Heems
- Kool A.D.
- Shelby Fero
- Martin Starr
- Jim Jarmusch
- Neil deGrasse Tyson

== Reception ==
Michael-Oliver Harding of Exclaim! gave the film an 8 out of 10, saying: "In more ways than one, Lough's unobtrusive though eye-opening portrait of Hot Sugar celebrates the free radical pursuits of a true artist." Stuart Brown of British Film Institute wrote, "we're given a rare insight into this sonic wanderer's highly unusual and absorbing approach to making music." Ethan Alter of Film Journal International described the film as "a fascinating portrait of love in the social-media age." Aaron Zorgel of Complex included the film on the "10 Music Documentaries You Need to See at HotDocs" list.

The film received an honorable mention at the 2015 Hot Docs Canadian International Documentary Festival.
