= East Village Radio =

Internet radio station

Coordinates: 40°43′25″N 73°59′18.3″W

- New York City; United States

Programming
- Format: Eclectic

Ownership
- Owner: East Village Radio

History
- Founded: 2003; 23 years ago

Links
- Website: eastvillageradio.com

East Village Radio (EVR), begun in August 2003, is an eclectic Internet radio station which broadcasts from a storefront studio at 21 First Avenue at East 1st Street in the East Village area of Manhattan. Originally a pirate radio station broadcasting at 88.1 MHz, the station shut down on May 23, 2014 and briefly relaunched in 2015 in conjunction with Dash Radio before once again shuttering in 2016.

East Village Radio relaunched again in July 2024.

Over 60 DJs and hosts provide 16 hours of free radio live programming a day, in two-hour show blocks, seven days a week. Programming features a mix of music, news, comedy and commentary.

Musical styles presented include indie rock, no wave, new wave, coldwave, hip hop, post-punk, jazz, funk, soul, house, techno and ambient electronica.

== History ==
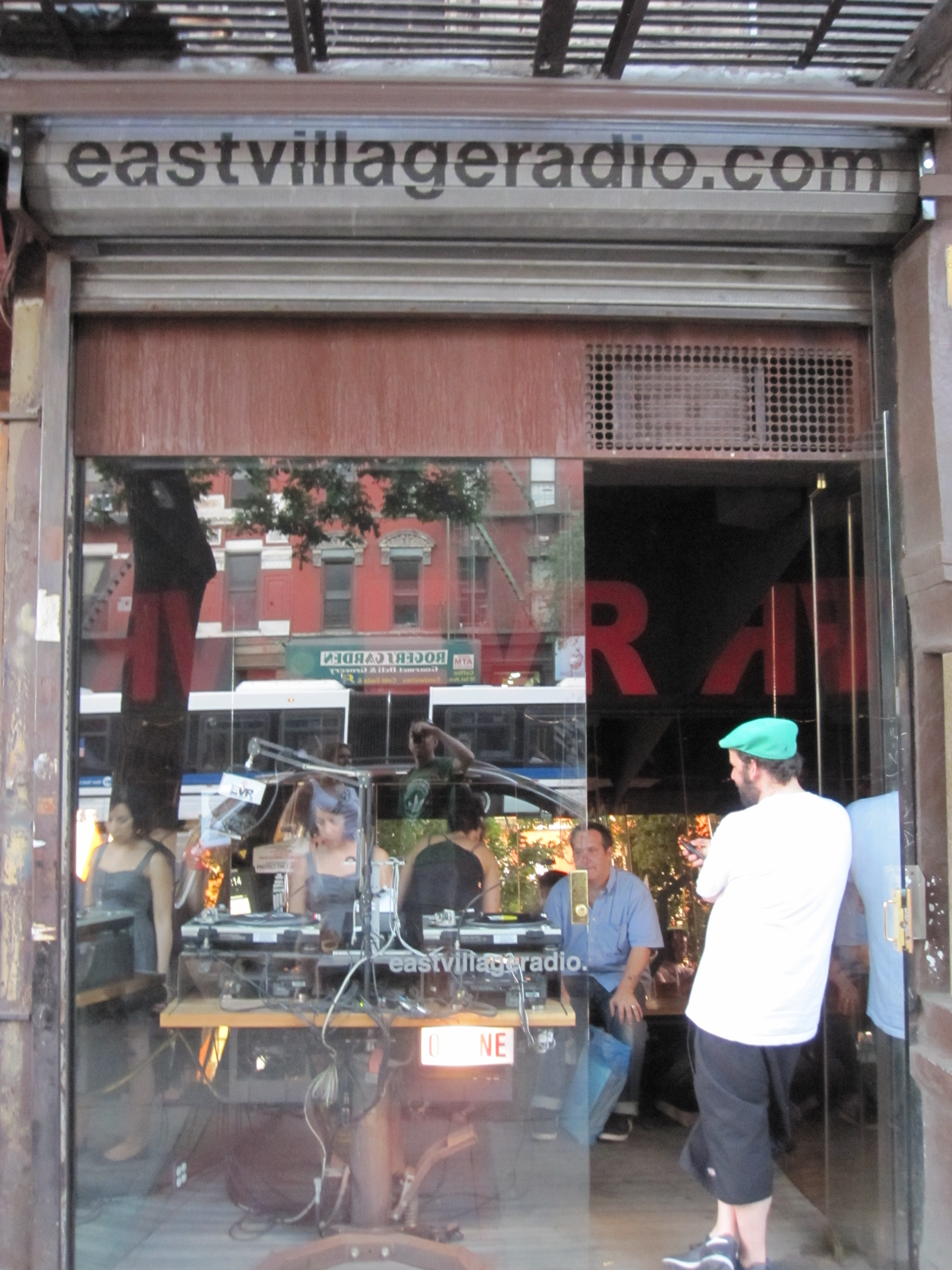
The East Village Radio storefront studio in 2010.

We started out as a pirate FM station, broadcasting from an apartment above Lil' Frankie's, which was essentially the office for L.F. plus a tiny adjacent room. We'd broadcast live from there, on 88.1 FM every day from 4pm-12am. We actually put the antenna on the roof of 19 1st Avenue ourselves! It was a intensely creative time, when Frank Prisinzano, myself, Jorge Docouto, and Donielle McCarry came together and formed the beginnings...— Veronica Vasicka – EVR Co-Founder, Host of Minimal Wave

"He had some extra space in one of his restaurants and he and a friend came up with the idea for a radio station based off, I think, Free Radio Austin,... They went out and bought the equipment, climbed up on the roof of the building that houses Lil' Frankie's, and started broadcasting." — Peter Ferraro, manager of East Village Radio.

EVR first aired in August 2003, broadcasting from a small room in a walk-up building at 19 First Ave. (next door to the current location) to provide commercial-free music and a voice for the East Village community. EVR was transmitting at twenty watts and began broadcasting online in September 2003. During transmission, EVR was broadcasting as a pirate station on 88.1FM and reached as far west as Varick Street (which also happened to be the location of one of the FCC headquarters!). About two weeks after a New York Times article on the station, EVR received a cease and desist order from the FCC.

East Village Radio was established in June 2003, initially funded by the restaurants of Frank Prisinzano, and broadcast on the airwaves at 88.1 FM. After an article in The New York Times described the station, the FCC sent a cease-and-desist letter as the station was not licensed to use the airwaves. Due to the difficulty of obtaining new FM licenses, the decision was made to make EVR an internet radio station.

Some time after this, it was decided to move the studio from its original location above a restaurant to a storefront booth on First Avenue in Manhattan. This was seen as a way of reconnecting EVR with the East Village community since the station was no longer literally on-the-air.

East Village Radio Festival 2008-09-06 South Street Seaport, New York City.

East Village Radio's DJ line-up included British multi-platinum artist and producer Mark Ronson.

Every Friday around 7:30 pm, I'd leave the studio in a mad scramble to make it to EVR by 8 pm. Often times, whoever I was working with in the studio would come along too, just to hang out. I remember Amy Winehouse joining me a few times, with the sweet intention of keeping me company. Then she'd eventually get bored after ten minutes and go to the tattoo parlor right next door. I think she got two or three tattoos before I decided I should stop inviting her along, for her own sake. — Mark Ronson – Host of Authentic Shit

One of its final guests before closing and relaunching was artist and Vector Gallery creator/curator JJ Brine on the AndrewAndrew show.

East Village radio briefly relaunched on Dash Radio in 2015.

East Village Radio relaunched again in July 2024.

== Shows/DJs ==
- Accidental Rhythm /Jason Eldredge
- Adequate Underground / Oblib, Jubei, Ged (w/ guests Cuba & Nano)
- All Over The Shop / Ben Allen & Stuart Rogers
- Analog Soul /Jacky Sommer & DatKat
- Andrew Andrew Sound Sound /AndrewAndrew
- Authentic Sh!t / Mark Ronson
- Atlantic Tunnel / Ed Rogers & Gaz Thomas
- Ballers Eve / DJ Dirrty, Minski Walker & Kat Daddy Slim
- Beyond Beyond is Beyond / Mike Newman
- Body Control / Bruce Tantum
- Chances with Wolves / Mikey Palms, DJ Kool Kear & Kray
- Chillin' Island / Dapwell from Das Racist / Despot (rapper)
- Coalition Chart Show / Mike Joyce
- Contemporary Adult / Michael Hirsch
- Digital Analog Therapy / Victor Vortexx & Friends
- Death By Audio / Edan Wilber
- Delancey Music Service / Stretch Armstrong & Eli Escobar
- Fast Forward Reverse / TimmyG
- Forty Deuce / Geebee, Keene & ExPee
- Fat Beats / Monster
- Friction on EVR / Bobby Friction
- Jamaica Rock / Queen Majesty
- Gay Beach / Tedward
- Genius Club / SUZ EQ
- Gold River Show / Jerry Jones
- Guilty Pleasure / DJ Elhaam
- Happy Medium / Lane LaColla
- Hella Fabulous / Hella and Ruth
- JetLag / Andy Rourke
- La Décadanse / Melody Nelson
- Ladies Please / Justin C.
- Minimal Wave / Veronica Vasicka
- Modern Products / Harris Smith
- Morricone Youth / Devon E. Levins
- Never Not Working / Oskar Mann
- Pizza Party / Max & Kevin
- Sandy Acres Sound Lab / Colleen Crumbcake
- Seaport Music Radio / dj Pledge
- Shocking Blue Sessions / Delphine Blue
- Short Bus Radio / DJ Speculator
- Youngin' Radio / FEEM
- 60 Degrees with Brian Ferrari
- Teenage Kicks / Nick and Nick
- The Big Cover Up / $mall ¢hange
- The Blue Label Show / Jamal Ali
- The Continuous Mammal / Niall Van Dyke
- The Let Out / The FADER
- The Lillywhite Sessions / Steve Lillywhite
- The Two for Tennis Show M.P. Messenie & Tim 'Love' Lee
- Universópolis / Julianne Escobedo Shepherd
