= Kondabolu =

Kondabolu (Telugu: కొండబోలు) is a Telugu surname. Notable people with the surname include:

- Ashok Kondabolu (born 1985), American comedian
- Hari Kondabolu (born 1982), American comedian
