= Sit Down, Man =

Mixtape by Das Racist
- Released: September 14, 2010
- Genre: Hip-hop
- Length: 77:49
- Labels: Greedhead; Mishka; Mad Decent
- Producers: Sabzi; Gordon Voidwell; Alex Kestner; Boi-1da; Kassa Overall; Teengirl Fantasy; Devo Springsteen; Tom Cruz; Keepaway; Chairlift; Sha-leik; Dame Grease; Like Magic; Das Racist; Dash Speaks; Mike Finito; Diplo; Scoop DeVille

Das Racist chronology
Shut Up, Dude (2010)	Sit Down, Man (2010)	Relax (2011)

Sit Down, Man is the second mixtape by American hip-hop trio Das Racist. It was released as a free download by Greedhead Music, Mishka, and Mad Decent on September 14, 2010. It gained over 40,000 downloads in its first week of release. An album release show was held at Santos Party House on September 16, 2010.

== Production ==
The mixtape is produced by Teengirl Fantasy, Chairlift, Diplo, Keepaway, and Boi-1da, among others. It includes guest appearances from Fat Tony, El-P, Kassa Overall, Roc Marciano, and Lakutis.

== Critical reception ==
Professional ratings
Aggregate scores
Source	Rating
AnyDecentMusic?	7.9/10
Review scores
Source	Rating
The A.V. Club	A−
MSN Music (Expert Witness)	A−
Now	4/5
Pitchfork	8.7/10
Rolling Stone	3.5/5 stars
Spin	8/10
Under the Radar	8/10

Pitchfork placed the mixtape at number 23 on the "Top 50 Albums of 2010" list.

"Hahahaha JK?" was placed at number 44 on Pitchfork's "Top 100 Tracks of 2010" list, as well as number 48 on Rolling Stone's "50 Best Songs of 2010" list.

== Track listing ==
No.	Title	Producer(s)	Length
1.	"WKCR Stretch and Bobbito Show (Intro)" (featuring Quincy Jones (speech))		0:27
2.	"All Tan Everything" (featuring Jay-Z (sample))	Sabzi	4:12
3.	"Puerto Rican Cousins"	Gordon Voidwell; Alex Kestner	3:02
4.	"Hahahaha JK?"	Boi-1da	5:48
5.	"Town Business" (featuring Kassa Overall)	Kassa Overall	4:00
6.	"Commercial"	Teengirl Fantasy	4:09
7.	"People Are Strange"	Devo Springsteen	3:35
8.	"Luv It Mayne" (featuring Fat Tony and Bo P.)	Tom Cruz	3:17
9.	"Amazing" (featuring Lakutis)	Keepaway	4:00
10.	"Fashion Party" (featuring Chairlift)	Chairlift	6:16
11.	"Rapping 2 U" (featuring Lakutis)	Sha-leik	4:41
12.	"Rooftop" (featuring Despot)	Dame Grease	4:56
13.	"Irresponsible" (featuring Lakutis)	Like Magic; Das Racist	3:49
14.	"Return to Innocence"	Dash Speaks	5:09
15.	"Julia (The Very Best Remix)"	Das Racist	3:57
16.	"Roc Marciano Joint" (featuring Roc Marciano)	Mike Finito	4:18
17.	"You Can Sell Anything"	Diplo	3:03
18.	"Sit Down, Man" (featuring El-P)	Scoop DeVille	3:55
19.	"Sit Down, People" (featuring Dapwell and Quincy Jones (speech))		0:57

== Personnel ==
Credits adapted from the liner notes.

- Sabzi – production (2)
- Gordon Voidwell – production, mixing (3)
- Alex Kestner – production, mixing (3)
- Boi-1da – production (4)
- Kassa Overall – production (5)
- Teengirl Fantasy – production (6)
- Devo Springsteen – production, mixing (7)
- Tom Cruz – production (8)
- Keepaway – production (9)
- Chairlift – production (10)
- Sha-leik – production (11)
- Dame Grease – production (12)
- Like Magic – production (13)
- Das Racist – production (13, 15)
- Dash Speaks – production (14)
- Mike Finito – production (16)
- Diplo – production (17)
- Scoop DeVille – production (18)
- Daniel Lynas – recording; mixing (1, 2, 4, 5, 8, 9, 11, 12, 14, 15, 16, 17, 18, 19, 20)
- Patrick Wimberly – mixing (6, 10, 13)
- DJA – mastering
- Katy Porter – artwork, photography
- Mishka – artwork, photography
- Himanshu Suri – executive production
- Le'Roy Benros – executive production
