= Heems =

American rapper (born 1985)

- Heems in 2010

Background information
- Also known as: Hima
- Born: Himanshu Kumar Suri; July 6, 1985 (age 41)
- Origin: Queens, New York, U.S.
- Genre: Hip-hop
- Occupation: Rapper
- Years active: 2008–present
- Labels: Greedhead; Megaforce; Veena Sounds; Mass Appeal
- Member of: Swet Shop Boys
- Formerly of: Das Racist

Himanshu Kumar Suri (born July 6, 1985), better known by his stage name Heems, is an American rapper. Suri came to prominence as a member of the alternative hip-hop group Das Racist, with whom he released two mixtapes and one album. Suri has also founded independent record labels Greedhead Music and Veena Sounds, and has released three solo albums and two mixtapes. With English musicians Riz MC and Redinho, Suri formed the group Swet Shop Boys in 2014.

== Early life ==
Born and raised in Bellerose, Queens, New York, he is of Punjabi-Indian descent. Suri's father moved to Flushing, Queens, in 1978. Suri graduated from Stuyvesant High School in 2003, where he met Das Racist band member Ashok Kondabolu, and was the vice president of the student council when the September 11 attacks happened two blocks away. Suri then attended Wesleyan University, where he studied economics and met Das Racist co-founder Kool A.D. After graduating from Wesleyan, Suri moved back to New York where he worked in the financial sector until finding success with Das Racist.

== Das Racist ==
In 2008, Suri formed Das Racist with his college friend Victor Vazquez, known professionally as Kool A.D. Shortly thereafter, Suri's high school friend Ashok Kondabolu joined as their hype man. Das Racist first found success on the internet with their 2008 song "Combination Pizza Hut and Taco Bell", and then quickly established themselves within the underground rap scene with their 2010 mixtapes Shut Up, Dude and Sit Down, Man, both of which earned them critical acclaim, including Pitchfork's designation of "Best New Music" and national tours.

== Solo career and Swet Shop Boys ==
While still with Das Racist, in January 2012, Suri released his first solo mixtape, Nehru Jackets, on his own Greedhead imprint. Nehru Jackets was released in collaboration with SEVA NY. Guests on Nehru Jackets include Despot, Danny Brown, and Childish Gambino. The album has received positive reviews, including a score of 8/10 from Spin. Heems's second mixtape, Wild Water Kingdom, was released on November 14, 2012, also on the Greedhead label. It features production from Harry Fraud, Keyboard Kid, Crookers, Beautiful Lou, Le1f, and Lushlife. Guests on Wild Water Kingdom include Childish Gambino and Lakutis.

After the break up of Das Racist, at the end of 2012, Suri moved to Mumbai to work on his first official album, and performed solo in India. In April 2014, he recorded a Japanese commercial for Vitamin Water. His debut solo album, Eat Pray Thug, was released on March 10, 2015, jointly with Greedhead and Megaforce Records. The first single, "Sometimes," was released on January 8, 2015. The album was recorded in Mumbai and Brooklyn, and includes collaborations with Dev Hynes (aka Blood Orange), Rafiq Bhatia, Gordon Voidwell, Boody B, and Harry Fraud. Heems has referred to the album as "9/11 and Heartbreak." In August 2015, Heems announced that Fox had bought his story rights for a potential sitcom, and that he was working on the pilot.

Suri, Riz MC, and Redinho formed Swet Shop Boys and released their EP, Swet Shop, in 2014, their debut album, Cashmere, in 2016, and their EP, Sufi La in 2017.

Barring a few features, after a seven year hiatus from music, in 2024, Suri released two albums — both on his new record label Veena Sounds, and jointly with Mass Appeal India — Lafandar with Chicago-based producer Lapgan (which has features from Kool Keith, Open Mike Eagle, Quelle Chris, Your Old Droog, Saul Williams, Blu, Sid Sriram, Cool Calm Pete and Sonnyjim) and Veena LP, with production and features from Sid Vashi, Vijay Iyer, Ram Dulari, Lapgan, Cool Calm Pete, Mr. Cheeks and Navz-47. He released a surprise album in 2025 – A Hundred Alibis (featuring Panda Bear, Unknown Mortal Orchestra, Lee Ranaldo of Sonic Youth, Anand Wilder, Patrick Wimberly, and Blood Cultures).

== Greedhead Music ==
To manage Das Racist, Suri founded his own record label, Greedhead Music, as a management and recording company in 2008. Greedhead's first releases were the group's 2010 mixtapes. Das Racist's first commercially available album, Relax, was also the first commercial release on the Greedhead imprint. Greedhead has since released solo mixtapes by Kool A.D. (The Palm Wine Drinkard) and Heems (Nehru Jackets), as well as Keepaway's Black Flute, Lakutis' I'm in the Forest, Le1f's Dark York, and Big Baby Gandhi's Big Fucking Baby. The label has been defunct since 2015.

== Activism ==
Suri has been a vocal advocate of the South Asian community in New York and has spoken about using his art to amplify South Asian stories. In January 2012, Suri joined the board of directors of the Queens-based community organization SEVA. Suri plans to work with SEVA to develop a community center with a recording studio for local youth. Suri has worked extensively with SEVA to push for more equitable redistricting in Queens. Suri has publicly supported Reshma Saujani's bid for New York City Public Advocate, saying, "We will probably have the highest South Asian voter turnout ever this year because of her on the ballot and the resources she will be putting in it. This is the most qualified and well resourced candidate from the [South Asian] community ever."

== Art ==
In addition to his musical career, Suri also maintains a longstanding relationship with the art scene, especially in New York City. In 2010, Das Racist performed as a part of the Whitney Museum of American Art's Biennial celebration, curated by California artist Martin Kersels. In April 2013, Suri returned to the Whitney as part of the Blues for Smoke exhibit, an interdisciplinary exhibition that explored "a wide range of contemporary art through the lens of the blues and blues aesthetics." He performed alongside former Das Racist member Ashok Kondabolu (Dapwell), Greedhead rapper Le1f, and psych-dance band Prince Rama. In February 2015, Heems curated an art exhibition at the Aicon Gallery in anticipation of his new album, Eat Pray Thug. The exhibition contained a wide variety of South Asian artists as well as events and performances throughout its month-long run, including artists such as The Kominas, Riz Ahmed (Riz MC), and Heems himself.

== Film ==
In 2012, Suri joined an all-star cast of New York musicians in Amrit Singh's documentary short, Dosa Hunt, on a quest to find the best dosa (a traditional South Indian dish) in town. In 2013, Heems made his acting debut along with R&B artist Kelis in "Brazzaville Teen-Ager," a short film which starred and was written and directed by Michael Cera. In 2015, he played a supporting role as rascally ad agency employee named Reny in Benjamin Dickinson's Creative Control, which premiered at SXSW 2015, where Heems also performed. Suri starred in Tanuj Chopra's 2016 film Chee and T, which premiered at the LA Film Festival.

== Controversies ==
Suri has also received attention for his activity on Twitter. In the aftermath of the death of Osama bin Laden, Suri collected and retweeted racist tweets, drawing attention to the prevalence of xenophobia and Islamophobia in the celebratory national mood. In January 2011, Rolling Stone magazine named Suri #11 on its list of "50 Top Tweeters in Music".

In 2023, Suri was the subject of a diss track by former Greedhead label-mate Big Baby Gandhi titled "Heems Drake Obama".

== Discography ==
=== Studio albums ===
- Eat Pray Thug (2015)
- Lafandar (2024, with Lapgan)
- Veena (2024)
- A Hundred Alibis (2025)

=== Mixtapes ===
- Nehru Jackets (2012)
- Wild Water Kingdom (2012)

=== Guest appearances ===
- Small Black – "Two Rivers" and "Sunday Son" from Moon Killer (2011)
- Lushlife – "Hale-Bopp Was the Bedouins" from Plateau Vision (2012)
- Meyhem Lauren – "Special Effects" and "Juevos Rancheros" from Respect the Fly Shit (2012)
- Meyhem Lauren – "Carvel" from Mandatory Brunch Meetings (2012)
- Weekend Money – "Yellow" from Naked City (2012)
- Hot Sugar – "56k" from Midi Murder (2012)
- Hot Sugar – "Born 2" from Made Man (2013)
- Misteur Valaire – "Life Gets Brutal" from Bellevue (2013)
- Maffew Ragazino – "Jackson Pollock" from Brownsville's Jesus (2014)
- Antwon – "KLF ELF" from Heavy Hearted in Doldrums (2014)
- Meyhem Lauren & Buckwild – "Narcotics Anonymous" from Silk Pyramids (2014)
- Vampire Weekend – "Step (Wintertime Remix)" (2014)
- Nick Catchdubs – "Full House" from Smoke Machine (2015)
- Sonnyjim – "Al Jazeera" from Mud in My Malbec (2016)
- Your Old Droog – "Bangladesh" from Packs (2017)
- Your Old Droog – "The Simpsons" from Yodney Dangerfield (2022)
- Rav – "Agent Orange" from LEAP (2023)

== See also ==
- Indians in the New York City metropolitan region
