= P Is for Pterodactyl =

2018 picture book about irregular spellings

P Is for Pterodactyl: The Worst Alphabet Book Ever
- Author: Raj Haldar; Chris Carpenter
- Illustrator: Maria Tina Beddia
- Language: English
- Genre: Alphabet book
- Publisher: Sourcebooks Jabberwocky
- Publication date: November 13, 2018
- Publication place: United States
- Pages: 40
- ISBN: 978-1-4926-7431-3
- Preceded by: N/A
- Followed by: No Reading Allowed

P Is for Pterodactyl: The Worst Alphabet Book Ever is a children's picture book written by Raj Haldar and Chris Carpenter and illustrated by Maria Tina Beddia. It showcases "English words with silent letters and bizarre spellings." The book was published by Sourcebooks Jabberwocky on November 13, 2018. It peaked at number 1 on The New York Times Best Seller list in the category for children's picture books. It has sold more than 210,000 copies.

== Publication ==
The idea for P Is for Pterodactyl originally came in 2016. Following the release of his album Ritualize, rapper Raj Haldar, whose stage name is Lushlife, celebrated with his friends. A friend's child brought some alphabet flash cards with him. Haldar and his friend Chris Carpenter, a software engineer, came up with the idea for the alphabet book. Artist Maria Tina Beddia joined the project at the recommendation of another mutual friend. Before the book found a publisher, there were a handful of rejections. Eventually, Sourcebooks Jabberwocky picked up the book. The book was published on November 13, 2018.

== Reception ==
The book was included on The New York Times' "Standout New Picture Books" list on October 19, 2018. Maria Russo wrote: "You can curse the English language for its insane spelling rules (or lack thereof), or you can delight in it, as this raucous trip through the odd corners of our alphabet does."

On November 6, 2018, a week before the book was published, a children's book website Imagination Soup praised the book on a Facebook post. The post went viral and gained over 4,000 comments. The book sold out of its first print run of 10,800 copies the day it was published.

On December 30, 2018, the book reached number 1 on The New York Times Best Seller list in the category for children's picture books. It remained in the top ten books on that list for 18 weeks.

== Sequel ==
In 2020, the sequel, No Reading Allowed: The Worst Read-Aloud Book Ever (which uses word-play based on homophones, homonyms, and differences of punctuation) was released by Sourcebooks Explore.
