= Nehru Jackets =

First solo mixtape by rapper Himanshu

Mixtape by Himanshu
- Released: January 17, 2012
- Genre: Hip-hop
- Length: 73:36
- Label: Greedhead
- Producer: Mike Finito

Himanshu chronology
Nehru Jackets (2012)	Wild Water Kingdom (2012)

Nehru Jackets is the first solo mixtape by American rapper Himanshu. It was released on Himanshu's own Greedhead Music label on January 17, 2012.

Rolling Stone named the song "Womyn" the 36th best song of 2012.

== Background ==
Himanshu released Nehru Jackets in collaboration with SEVA NY to draw attention to the redistricting battle in Queens, New York. Guests on Nehru Jackets include Despot, Danny Brown, Childish Gambino, Fat Tony, and Mr. Muthafuckin' eXquire. In an interview with Rolling Stone, he explained the creation process: "with Mike [Finito], I just kind of let him do his thing. I told him I wanted Indian stuff, and he cooked it up. Mike just gave me, like, 40 beats and I fucked with whatever I liked." The mixtape's cover is a parody of the packaging of Parle-G biscuits.

== Critical reception ==
Professional ratings
Review scores
Source	Rating
The A.V. Club	B+
Robert Christgau	A−
Pitchfork	6.5/10
Rolling Stone	3.5/5 stars
Spin	8/10

Zach Kelly of Pitchfork commented that "Nehru Jackets as a whole is pretty loose, filled with free-associative raps that find Heems in various states of alertness, sobriety, and engagement." He added, "[Mike] Finito's work is one of the tape's strengths, but it also leaves Heems with a lot of ground to cover, and much of the material ends up feeling unfocused."

=== Accolades ===
Publication	Accolade	Rank	Ref.
Exclaim!	Best Albums of 2012: Hip-Hop	15	
Forbes	Best Free Albums of 2012	13	
Spin	50 Best Albums of 2012	49	
Spin	40 Best Hip-Hop Albums of 2012	9	

== Track listing ==
No.	Title	Length
1.	"Thug Handles"	1:32
2.	"Bad, Bad, Bad"	3:11
3.	"Alien Gonzalez"	3:00
4.	"Nehru Jackets Interlude"	0:22
5.	"Choorhay Lare" (featuring Lovedeep Singh and Pawan)	3:05
6.	"Swate" (featuring Lakutis and Kool A.D.)	6:09
7.	"NYC Cops"	3:58
8.	"You Have to Ride the Wave" (featuring Danny Brown and Mr. Muthafuckin' eXquire)	4:55
9.	"Mike Finito Raps Too"	1:07
10.	"Womyn"	3:22
11.	"Bangles" (featuring Fat Tony and Big Baby Gandhi)	3:54
12.	"Ravi Shankar PSA"	0:35
13.	"It's the Drug I'm Needing"	3:45
14.	"Coca Cola Freestyle"	1:50
15.	"Chakklo" (featuring Ravi Eah Singh and Lovedeep Singh)	4:49
16.	"Jason Bourne"	1:56
17.	"Desi Shoegaze Taiko"	3:09
18.	"I Want It Bad (Liquid Heart)"	2:56
19.	"Juveniles Detained at Guantanamo Bay"	1:59
20.	"Kate Boosh" (featuring Despot and Kool A.D.)	3:11
21.	"What Do I Do When I'm Alone"	2:47
22.	"Computers"	1:56
23.	"Yo What's Good New York" (featuring Action Bronson, Lakutis, and Kool A.D.)	3:43
24.	"Womyn 2" (featuring Childish Gambino)	3:27
25.	"Tu Nach" (featuring Duggla Don)	3:11
Total length:		73:36

=== Notes ===
- The track Kate Boosh contains a sample of Kate Bush's song Suspended in Gaffa.
