= Chillin Island =

2021 HBO reality series

- Genre: Reality
- Presented by: Steven Wright
- Starring: Alec Reinstein; Ashok Kondabalu; Aleksey Weintraub
- Music by: E*vax
- Country of origin: United States
- Original language: English
- No. of seasons: 1
- No. of episodes: 6

Production
- Running time: 25 minutes
- Production companies: DreamCrew; Elara Pictures; Spotify

Original release
- Network: HBO
- Release: December 17, 2021 – January 28, 2022

Chillin Island is an unscripted slow reality television miniseries presented by Steven Wright. Based on the radio show of the same name, it is hosted by Alec "Despot" Reinstein, Ashok "Dapwell" Kondabalu and Aleksey "Lakutis" Weintraub. It originally aired on HBO and ran for six episodes between December 17, 2021 and January 28, 2022.

Chillin Island follows Despot, Dapwell and Lakutis, alongside celebrity guest stars, as they travel to wild nature sites. The series is produced by DreamCrew and Elara Pictures, with Josh Safdie, Benny Safdie and Drake as its executive producers. The series was inspired by the 1991 Bravo reality miniseries Fishing with John.

== Format ==
In each episode, Despot, Dapwell and Lakutis embark on a trip to wild nature sites with a celebrity guest star, typically from hip hop culture. Each episode is narrated by Wright and concludes with a commemorative end credit to John Lurie.

== Critical reception ==
In a positive review, Israel Daramola of The Ringer praised Chillin Island for its themes and humor, saying, the series is "full of [an] adventurous, play-by-ear-and-joke-along-the-way spontaneity". Daramola also commended Wright's narration, the series' "goofy and, as advertised, chill" tone and pace, and the hosts' chemistry, concluding that, "Chillin Island has created a fun hang of a show that portrays the great outdoors as bizarre [and] enlightening".

In a positive review for The New Yorker, Naomi Fry labelled Chillin Island "a woozy, exploratory stoner’s delight", while Ariel LeBeau of Nylon called the series "a vacation for your mind", writing: "Eccentric, awkward, surprisingly intimate, and sometimes surreal, Chillin Island is an inviting departure from the traditional media landscape for host, guest, and audience alike; a journey into the unexpected that, in its informality, feels thrillingly human". Jeff Ihaza of Rolling Stone also commended the series for building on the "raw and unpredictable magic" of the radio show, concluding, "Chillin Island restores something unexpected and jagged that [viewers] used to [watch television] for. Back when network television was still interested in surprising people".

Writing for Variety, Daniel D'Addario wrote the series contains "faux-profundity that rankles and irritates more than it could possibly enlighten". D'Addario criticized its production for being "heavy-handed and semi-staged" and Lil Yachty's opinions on modern medicine and overpopulation, concluding that "Chillin Island may satisfy hardcore fans of its central personalities [but others] will likely be badly disappointed".

== Episodes ==
=== Season 1 (2021) ===
No. in season	Title	Original release date	U.S. viewers (millions)
1	"Young Thug"	December 17, 2021	N/A
2	"Lil Yachty"	December 24, 2021	N/A
3	"Lil Tecca ft. Ezra Koenig"	December 31, 2021	N/A
4	"Ski Mask the Slump God"	January 7, 2022	N/A
5	"Gunna and Killer Mike"	January 14, 2022	N/A
6	"Coi Leray ft. Rosalía"	January 28, 2022	N/A

== See also ==
- List of HBO original programming
- Slow television
