= Cosplay Fetish Battle Drones =

- Directed by: Gregg Golding
- Written by: Gregg Golding
- Produced by: Gregg Golding; Diana Chow; Edward Rhodes
- Starring: Samuel Vasquez; Leland Mapp; Gregg Golding; Carly Jean; Liza Moore; Mathias Parr; Dapwell
- Edited by: Gregg Golding
- Production company: Collage Fossil Pictures
- Release date: December 11, 2013 (Another Hole In The Head International Genre Film Festival)
- Running time: 75 minutes
- Country: United States
- Language: English

Cosplay Fetish Battle Drones (formerly titled Struggled Reagans) is an American science fiction comedy film that was the first feature film by director and screenwriter Gregg Golding. The movie had its world premiere on December 11, 2013, at Another Hole In The Head International Genre Film Festival, and is a surrealistic parody of Japanese tokusatsu series such as Power Rangers and Kamen Rider.

== Synopsis ==
Six teenagers suffer from a series of emotional traumas, which coalesce to create a tumor in the collective unconscious. They are then summoned to the home of one of the teenagers (Evie, played by Carly Jean, and based on the character of the same name from the television sitcom Out of This World) where her alien father, (based on the character Troy, also from Out of This World, and portrayed by hip hop artist Dapwell) gives them powers based on their respective traumas. The teenagers, now known as the Struggled Reagans, search for the tumor in an effort to destroy it. Their efforts are opposed by the Hindu god Garuda, who uses the energy from the tumor to create a number of monsters to oppose them.

The film's plot and characters reference and parody various aspects of popular culture, including most significantly the Japanese tokusatsu genre, and also is laden with philosophical and surrealistic elements.

== Cast ==
- Samuel Vasquez as Billy
- Leland Mapp as Antoine
- Gregg Golding as Jason
- Carly Jean as Evie
- Liza Moore as Maya
- Mathias Parr as Tommy
- Dapwell as Dad

== Release ==
The film premiered (under its original title of Struggled Reagans) on December 11, 2013 at San Francisco's Another Hole In The Head International Genre Film Festival. It has also screened at the Sci-Fi London 2014 film festival.

The film was released on DVD in February, 2015.

== Controversy ==
"After YouTube took trailers of the movie down for infringement, the group fought back (with some help from the EFF) and now the trailer is back on YouTube because parody is fair use."

== Reception ==
Sight & Sound commented: "Drawing from a disparate mélange of sources (1980s sit-coms, Hindu mythology, television’s tokusatsu genre), tweaking the film’s backgrounds with cheap digital psychedelic effects and accumulating free-associative ideas with disorienting speed, Struggled Reagans is horny, lysergic and postmodern, reconfiguring its Power Rangers-style ensemble heroics as both priapic trash and transcendental parable. The performances are broad, the sound mix is terrible, the onscreen actions are downright offensive – but this is also outsider auteurism at its most audacious".

An extremely negative review at HorrorNews.net criticised the plot, the acting and the overall production, after admitting that the first scene was enjoyable: "Within the first 15 minutes there are some pretty crazy sex scenes (and I mean crazy) that revolve around one of the main characters, Evie. Evie comes across as one pretty messed up chick, but then again who wouldn’t be when your father lives in a rainbow lamp and watches you masturbate?"; Rebecca Brown, the reviewer, however, concluded that, if it wasn't for that opening, she would have rated the film 0 out of 10.

Pam Jahm, of Electric Sheep, a website dedicated to "deviant" film, had a similar appraisal and wrote that she could "[describe] Struggled Reagans as a punk-trash porno tongue-in-cheek underground take on the Mighty Morphin Power Rangers (1993-present)" associated with a "wretched a film-watching experience" and concluded: "For about half its running time Struggled Reagans is amusing or quirky enough to justify its existence, with the filmmakers channelling the style of early John Waters or Troma films reasonably well, but it is a struggle to persevere with the 85-minute runtime and the story would have been better received if delivered in shorter instalments like its TV forebear."

The film was also described as "hilariously bizarro" and a "naughty parody of Mighty Morphin Power Rangers" and "(m)ore a piece of performance art than an actual film, (a) psychedelic video freak out"
