= Despot (rapper) =

American rapper (born 1982)

- Born: Alec Israel Reinstein; May 7, 1982 (age 44); Queens, New York, United States
- Origin: Brooklyn, New York, United States
- Genre: Hip hop
- Occupation: Rapper
- Instrument: Vocals
- Years active: 2004–present
- Label: Definitive Jux

Alec Reinstein (born May 7, 1982), better known by his stage name Despot, is an American hip hop artist from Queens, New York City. He was signed to rapper El-P's label Definitive Jux in 2004. Despot has been a part of the New York underground rap scene for over two decades. Despot is associated with the Smart Crew collective and was a co-owner of Santos Party House.

== Early life and education ==
Despot grew up in the Forest Hills neighborhood of Queens. He became involved in hip-hop at an early age, claiming that its prevalence amongst kids in his neighborhood made him appreciate rap. Around the age of twelve, Despot began to hang out with a Brooklyn gang called the Lo-Lives, most notable for wearing Polo Ralph Lauren clothing. Despot identifies himself as hopelessly addicted to sneakers and Polo clothing.

Despot claims to have been more of a delinquent as a teenager because he constantly listened to Mobb Deep's The Infamous. Upon buying 6 Feet Deep, supergroup Gravediggaz' first album, Despot wore baggy pants and carried a Panasonic boom box around with him. He was given the nickname "Puff" because of his marijuana use. During his years in junior high school, Despot and his friends rapped over an instrumental tape of "Worldwide" by Royal Flush. Despot's friends told him he was the most talented of the group, and he began to write rhymes.

He attended high school in Manhattan, where he and friend Yak Ballz (who was also signed to Definitive Jux) would frequent Footwork, the East Village record store owned by radio personality Bobbito García. It was through Garcia that Despot would eventually meet El-P. After graduating high school Despot attended SUNY Purchase, but later dropped out "after realizing it was boring." Despot still went back to the school to organize its Culture Shock festival in 2004 and 2005, and he performed at the event in 2007.

== Career ==
In 2001, Despot recorded the song "Cynical Bastards" with Lo-Deck on Atoms Family member Cryptic One's album Euphony. The track garnered attention from El-P, who asked Despot to record for Definitive Jux. Despot released "Homesickness" as a single on Def Jux Presents 3 in 2004. Following "Homesickness", Despot had his plans in making his album stalled, primarily because of his not spending time working on the album. He also believed a neurotic perfectionism prevented him from releasing songs more quickly. Despite never releasing the album, he released a number of songs during his time at Definitive Jux, including "Crap Artists" and "Look Alive", which was produced by Ratatat. Despot toured with Ratatat in 2007, and his forthcoming album will feature their production.

Despot claimed to have finished his first full-length album, a collaborative effort with Ratatat featuring songs from Blockhead, as early as June 2008. The album was initially named Jerry (after his father) and then Hooray for Me before finally arriving at We're All Excited. The first single was released July 13, 2015, titled "House of Bricks", despite being performed live regularly since 2012. On July 22, 2015, Despot released a music video for "House of Bricks", directed by Ratatat's E*vax.

== Collaborations ==
Despot met Ashok Kondabolu and Himanshu Suri, members of Das Racist, in 2008 and was featured on their 2010 mixtape Sit Down, Man, on the song "Rooftop". Despot featured on El-P's 2012 album Cancer 4 Cure and Meyhem Lauren's Respect the Fly Shit, where he raps with Action Bronson on "Pan Seared Tilapia".

In 2011, Despot appeared on the remix for Mr. Muthafuckin eXquire's "The Last Huzzah" alongside Das Racist, Danny Brown, and El-P, which was called one of the best songs of 2011 by Rolling Stone. He opened for Das Racist on their Relax Tour in 2011 as well as El-P and Killer Mike's 2012 Into the Wild Tour. He was also featured on Das Racist's 2011 album Relax on the song "Power" alongside Danny Brown. Despot appeared alongside Heems in Lakutis's 2013 video "Too Ill for the Law".

On June 3, 2013, he was featured in Vampire Weekend's "Diane Young" music video. In the same year, he was featured on Fat Tony's "Hood Party" off of the Smart Ass Black Boy album along with Kool A.D. In November 2013, he appeared on Blood Orange's album Cupid Deluxe on the song "Clipped On". On January 1, 2014, Vampire Weekend released "Step (Wintertime Remix)", which included guest verses from Despot, Danny Brown, and Heems. On December 15, 2014, iLoveMakonnen released "Down 4 So Long (Remix)", which featured Despot and Ezra Koenig.

In 2016, Despot opened a Jewish deli in Brooklyn's Greenpoint neighborhood alongside El-P and Holy Ghost!'s Alex Frankel.

== Discography ==
=== Studio album ===
Title	Album details
We're All Excited	Released: TBA; Label: Definitive Jux; Format: Digital download

=== Singles ===
==== As lead artist ====
Title	Year	Album
"Homesickness"	2004	Def Jux Presents 3
"Life with Snarky Parker"	2004	Non-album single
"Get Rich or Try Dying"	2007	Definitive Swim
"Look Alive"	2009	Definitive Jux Presents IV
"House of Bricks"	2015	We're All Excited

=== Guest appearances ===
List of non-single guest appearances, with other performing artists, showing year released and album name
Title	Year	Artist(s)	Album
"Freestyle"	2007	Ratatat	Ratatat Remixes Vol. 2
"Rooftop"	2010	Das Racist	Sit Down, Man
"Power"	2011	Das Racist, Danny Brown	Relax
"The Last Huzzah!"	2011	Mr. Muthafuckin' eXquire, Das Racist, Danny Brown, El-P	Lost in Translation
"Kate Boosh"	2012	Heems	Nehru Jackets
"Tougher Colder Killer"	2012	El-P, Killer Mike	Cancer 4 Cure
"Pan Seared Tilapia"	2012	Meyhem Lauren, AG Da Coroner, Action Bronson	Respect the Fly Shit
"Clipped On"	2013	Blood Orange	Cupid Deluxe
"Hood Party"	2013	Fat Tony, Kool A.D.	Smart Ass Black Boy
"Step" (Wintertime Remix)	2013	Vampire Weekend, Danny Brown, Heems	—N/a
"Blockbuster Night, Pt. 2"	2014	Run the Jewels, Wiki	Run the Jewels 2
"Down 4 So Long" (Remix)	2014	iLoveMakonnen, Ezra Koenig	—N/a
"Steep Tech"	2015	Ratking, Destiny Frasqueri	700-Fill
"Satellite"	2016	Secret Circle (Wiki, Antwon, and Lil Ugly Mane)	—N/a
"Versailles"	2022	Billy Woods	Aethiopes
"Now That's What I Call A Posse Cut Vol. 56"	2023	Blockhead, Bruiser Wolf, Danny Brown, Billy Woods	The Aux
"Corinthians"	2025	Billy Woods	Golliwog
