= Smart Ass Black Boy =

Studio album by Fat Tony
- Released: June 11, 2013
- Genre: Hip-hop
- Length: 41:08
- Label: Young One Records
- Producer: Tom Cruz

Fat Tony chronology
RABDARGAB (2010)	Smart Ass Black Boy (2013)	MacGregor Park (2017)

Smart Ass Black Boy is the second studio album by American rapper Fat Tony. It was released on Young One Records on June 11, 2013. Written in two days and recorded in four days, the album is entirely produced by Tom Cruz. Music videos were created for "BKNY", "Hood Party", and "Smart Ass Black Boy".

== Critical reception ==
Professional ratings
Review scores
Source	Rating
AllMusic	4/5 stars
Robert Christgau	A−
Rolling Stone	3.5/5 stars
Spin	7/10
XXL	XL

David Jeffries of AllMusic gave the album 4 stars out of 5, noting "a laid-back, warm, Andre 3000-styled flow, some golden age swagger, plus a never-ending supply of witty lyrics" as the appeal of the album. Nick De Molina of XXL called it "a fine example of how to make a smart, cohesive album without a clear-cut narrative to guide the listener along".

Vice placed the album at number 38 on the "Top 50 Albums of 2013" list. Complex placed it at number 5 on the "10 Best Houston Rap Mixtapes of 2013" list. Houston Press included it on the "11 Best Houston Releases of 2013" list.

In 2015, Dallas Observer placed "Hood Party" at number 46 on the "50 Best Texas Rap Songs" list.

== Track listing ==
No.	Title	Length
1.	"Smart Ass Black Boy"	2:31
2.	"Final Destination"	2:56
3.	"Creepin'" (featuring Stunnaman and Tom Cruz)	3:55
4.	"BKNY" (featuring Old Money)	4:21
5.	"I Shine"	3:30
6.	"Never Let You Go" (featuring Boy/friend)	4:26
7.	"Hood Party" (featuring Kool A.D. and Despot)	4:06
8.	"Frenzy" (featuring Tom Cruz)	3:22
9.	"Father's Day"	4:25
10.	"Sleepover" (featuring Shawn Neon)	3:13
11.	"The More Things Change (The More They Stay the Same)"	4:20
