= Spark Master Tape =

Rapper

Spark Master Tape is the pseudonym of an anonymous rapper. He has released six mixtapes since 2012 the newest being Sale Of A Soul which dropped on March 1, 2023. In true Spark style it was teased to be dropping on Feb. 29, 2023. 2023 was not a leap year. These albums have garnered interest from blogs and music websites such as Mass Appeal Magazine, passionweiss.com, The Daily Dot, Noisey.Vice, Complex, DJBooth, and The Fader, to name a few. All of his beats are produced by Paper Platoon, which is also the name of his unique collective that includes visual artists and musicians, just goDs.

Spark Master Tape's second mixtape, 2013's The #SWOUP Serengeti, was described by Mishka NYC as, "enough bump and 808s to satisfy y'all that think Juicy J is god and enough verbal dexterity to have everyone that misses the old days of rappity rapping." Masking his voice by pitching it down and sampling everything from 2pac to rare soul, Spark Master Tape has been described as "a gimmick, a sonic choice, or something in-between."

In 2014, Spark Master Tape tunneled deep into the underground and went completely dark. His X (Twitter), Facebook, and Instagram sat silent, comments posted speculated about his disappearance. There was no real information about Spark's whereabouts. The rest of the Paper Platoon collective were also gone. Rumors circulated that he may be in prison, but were never plausibly confirmed nor denied. No official word was given by anyone in Paper Platoon.

On January 25, 2016, after about two years since his mysterious disappearance, Spark Master Tape tweeted "#SWOUP". This was the first communication from Spark since 2014. A week or so later, a video was posted to the official Spark Master Tape YouTube and Facebook, which showed a small group of people, filmed in black and white, wearing strange masks. At the end of this video, which was titled "SUNKKEN", words appear on the screen that say "Silhouette of a Sunkken City" and "March". This is in reference to his long-awaited third album, Silhouette of a Sunkken City. He then released his first song since his return, "Livin' Lavish", on February 19. The music video for "Livin' Lavish" was released on February 23. In an interview with The Fader explaining his new video and sudden return, Spark Master Tape said, "2016 the year of that sewage and garbage, we out here militant and ignorant. Schemin' on everybody with a hoverboard and a dream. Shout out to DJ Charlie holdin' shit down like he back to baptizing. We out the ocean, ready. In the name of Spark, the Paper Platoon and the holy #SWOUP; we shall rise." On March 29, after a short period of silence, fans received a brand new #SWOUP visual "Tenkkeys". In an interview with Complex, the Paper Platoon General said "It all started with some SWOUP and a hand grenade, five years later we swimmin' out the case like Polly Pocket lookin' for a place to park this 2106 Lada. We on that 3-6-5, cash grab with a chance of voluntary manslaughter. #SWOUP". On the same premiere, it was announced that Spark's third album would drop April 15.

It was announced in October 2016 that Spark Master Tape would be opening for Run the Jewels on their Run the World Tour, though in January 2017, it was announced that they would have to pull out of the remaining tour dates due to unspecified "legalities" out of their control.

In late 2017, Spark Master Tape introduced Flmmboiint Frdii, a new artist that is featured in his fifth EP "Seven Sekkonds of Silence".

In mid 2018, Spark Master Tape tweeted about and released new songs that will be on his new upcoming EP.

On February 14, 2020, Spark Master Tape was featured in two songs, Go Bananas and Gasoline Pt 2, on Baby Gravy 2, a collaborative album between rappers Yung Gravy and bbno$.

== Discography ==
- Syrup Splash (2012)
- The #SWOUP Serengeti (2013)
- Silhouette of a Sunkken City (2016)
- The Lost Grapes EP (2017)
- Seven Sekkonds of Silence (2018)
- The Sale of a Soul (2023)
