= Relax (Das Racist album) =

Studio album by Das Racist
- Released: September 13, 2011
- Studios: See-Thru Studios, Brooklyn, New York, U.S.
- Genre: Hip-hop
- Length: 50:12
- Label: Greedhead Music
- Producers: Kool A.D.; Heems; Patrick Wimberly; Anand Wilder; Blood Diamonds; El-P; Diplo; Dash Speaks; J-La; Rostam Batmanglij; Francis Farewell Starlite

Das Racist chronology
Sit Down, Man (2010)	Relax (2011)

Singles from Relax
- 1. "Michael Jackson" Released: August 2, 2011

Relax is the only studio album by American hip-hop trio Das Racist. It was released by Greedhead Music on September 13, 2011. It peaked at number 111 on the Billboard 200 chart.

== Production ==
The album is produced by Diplo, El-P, Rostam Batmanglij, and Anand Wilder, among others. It includes guest appearances from El-P, Danny Brown, and Despot.

== Release ==
On August 2, 2011, Das Racist released "Michael Jackson", the lead single from the album. The music video for the song was premiered on September 9, 2011. Directed by Weird Days, the video references Michael Jackson's "Black or White" video, featuring the morphing faces of El-P, Despot, Lakutis, Hari Kondabolu, Mike Finito, Anand Wilder, Rostam Batmanglij, and Ben Schecter, among others.

The album was released by Greedhead Music on September 13, 2011.

The band played Late Night with Conan O'Brien on September 28, 2011.

Music videos were also created for "Brand New Dance" and "Girl".

== Critical reception ==
Professional ratings
Aggregate scores
Source	Rating
AnyDecentMusic?	7.2/10
Metacritic	78/100
Review scores
Source	Rating
AllMusic	4/5 stars
The A.V. Club	B+
Chicago Tribune	3.5/4 stars
Consequence of Sound	3.5/5 stars
Los Angeles Times	3.5/4 stars
MSN Music (Expert Witness)	A
Pitchfork	6.3/10
Rolling Stone	3.5/5 stars
Slant Magazine	4/5 stars
Spin	8/10

At Metacritic, which assigns a weighted average score out of 100 to reviews from mainstream critics, the album received an average score of 78, based on 21 reviews, indicating "generally favorable reviews".

Tuyet Nguyen of The A.V. Club gave the album a "B+" grade, praising Das Racist's "acutely modern sense of humor." Jesse Cataldo of Slant Magazine gave the album 4 stars out of 5, saying, "Relax finds Das Racist operating as both consumers and creators of pop culture, spawning an endless pomo cycle of criticism and observation." Paul de Revere of Consequence of Sound called it "Das Racist's definitive album to date."

=== Accolades ===
Publication	Accolade	Rank	Ref.
Robert Christgau	The Dean's List: Christgau's Best of 2011	1	
Complex	25 Best Albums of 2011	14	
Rolling Stone	50 Best Albums of 2011	28	
Spin	50 Best Albums of 2011	16	
Spin	40 Best Rap Albums of 2011	4	
Stereogum	Top 50 Albums of 2011	41	

== Track listing ==
No.	Title	Producer(s)	Length
1.	"Relax"	Kool A.D.; Heems; Patrick Wimberly	4:29
2.	"Michael Jackson"	Kool A.D.; Heems; Wimberly	4:16
3.	"Brand New Dance"	Wimberly	3:01
4.	"Middle of the Cake" (featuring Anand Wilder)	Anand Wilder	3:43
5.	"Girl"	Blood Diamonds	3:23
6.	"Shut Up, Man" (featuring El-P)	El-P	4:32
7.	"Happy Rappy"	Diplo	2:21
8.	"Booty in the Air"	Wimberly	3:47
9.	"Power" (featuring Danny Brown and Despot)	Dash Speaks	4:46
10.	"Punjabi Song" (featuring Bikram Singh)	J-La	3:31
11.	"Selena"	Wimberly	2:16
12.	"Rainbow in the Dark"	J-La	3:51
13.	"The Trick"	Rostam Batmanglij	3:01
14.	"Celebration"	Francis Farewell Starlite	2:40

== Personnel ==
Credits adapted from the liner notes.

- Kool A.D. – production (1, 2), artwork
- Heems – production (1, 2), executive production
- Patrick Wimberly – production (1, 2, 3, 8, 11), executive production, recording, mixing
- Travis Rosenberg – pedal steel guitar (2, 8)
- Anand Wilder – vocals (4), production (4)
- Blood Diamonds – production (5)
- El-P – vocals (6), production (6)
- Diplo – production (7)
- Lakutis – handclap (8)
- Danny Brown – vocals (9)
- Despot – vocals (9)
- Dash Speaks – production (9)
- Bikram Singh – vocals (10)
- J-La – production (10, 12)
- Rostam Batmanglij – production (13)
- Francis Farewell Starlite – production (14)
- Josh Ascalon – engineering (8, 11)
- Daniel Lynas – engineering (9)
- Chris Gehringer – mastering
- Katy Porter – photography

== Charts ==
Chart (2011)	Peak position
US Billboard 200	111
US Heatseekers Albums (Billboard)	1
US Independent Albums (Billboard)	26
US Top R&B/Hip-Hop Albums (Billboard)	15
US Top Rap Albums (Billboard)	12
