= Plateau Vision =

Studio album by Lushlife
- Released: April 17, 2012
- Genre: Hip hop
- Length: 43:55
- Label: Western Vinyl
- Producer: Lushlife; Botany; Mark Saddlemire; Big Jerm

Lushlife chronology
No More Golden Days (2011)	Plateau Vision (2012)	Ritualize (2016)

Singles from Plateau Vision
- 1. "Still I Hear the Word Progress" Released: March 6, 2012

Plateau Vision is a solo studio album by Lushlife. It was released on Western Vinyl on April 17, 2012. It includes guest appearances from Styles P, Heems, Shad, and Cities Aviv. "The Romance of the Telescope" is based on the OMD song of the same name. Music videos were created for "Still I Hear the Word Progress" and "Magnolia".

== Critical reception ==
Professional ratings
Aggregate scores
Source	Rating
Metacritic	79/100
Review scores
Source	Rating
HipHopDX	4.0/5
Pitchfork	6.9/10
PopMatters	7/10 stars
Spin	8/10

At Metacritic, which assigns a weighted average score out of 100 to reviews from mainstream critics, the album received an average score of 79, based on 6 reviews, indicating "generally favorable reviews".

Jake Paine of HipHopDX gave the album a 4.0 out of 5, saying: "The artist knows he might not fit into the musical worlds that influenced him, but he pays homage to them without sacrificing much of his own dignity." Hari Ashurst of Pitchfork wrote, "there's enough of a sweet spot in the clean, backward-leaning production and offbeat samples to allow the record to distinguish itself as more than a sum of disparate parts."

Rhapsody placed it at number 8 on the "Top 20 Hip-Hop Albums of 2012" list. Stereogum placed it at number 25 on the "Top 40 Rap Albums of 2012" list.

== Track listing ==
No.	Title	Producer(s)	Length
1.	"Magnolia"	Lushlife	4:47
2.	"Still I Hear the Word Progress" (featuring Styles P)	Lushlife	5:18
3.	"The Romance of the Telescope" (featuring Andrew Cedermark)	Lushlife	4:52
4.	"Big Sur"	Botany	3:22
5.	"Glistening" (featuring STS)	Lushlife	2:34
6.	"Gymnopedie 1.2" (featuring Shad)	Lushlife	2:15
7.	"Anthem"	Lushlife; Mark Saddlemire	4:26
8.	"Hale-Bopp Was the Bedouins" (featuring Heems)	Botany	3:50
9.	"She's a Buddhist, I'm a Cubist" (featuring Cities Aviv)	Lushlife; Big Jerm	3:28
10.	"Progress (Sun Glitters Reprise)" (featuring Ryat)	Lushlife	4:33
11.	"Stakk Cheddar Galore, Alwyn Dias"	Lushlife	4:30
Total length:			43:55
