= Shut Up, Dude =

Mixtape by Das Racist
- Released: March 29, 2010
- Genre: Hip-hop
- Length: 64:32
- Labels: Greedhead; Mishka
- Producers: Young Paperboy; Sabzi; Le1f; Aries Noise; J-La; Charles & Beck; Gordon Voidwell; Like Magic; Das Racist; Alfred Jenkins; Arturo Klauft; Kassa Overall; Mike Finito

Das Racist chronology
Shut Up, Dude (2010)	Sit Down, Man (2010)

Shut Up, Dude is the first mixtape by American hip-hop trio Das Racist. It was released as a free download by Greedhead Music and Mishka on March 29, 2010.

== Music videos ==
A music video was created for "Who's That? Brooown!". The video linked to a playable online game. Pitchfork included it on the "Top Music Videos of 2010" list, while Rolling Stone included it on the "Best Videos of 2010" list. It was selected to screen at the 2011 Sundance Film Festival. A music video was also created for "Rainbow in the Dark".

== Critical reception ==
Professional ratings
Review scores
Source	Rating
Cokemachineglow	76/100
Consequence of Sound	2.5/5 stars
MSN Music (Expert Witness)	A−
Pitchfork	7.8/10
Spin	8/10

Nate Patrin of Pitchfork gave the mixtape a 7.8 out of 10, saying, "Das Racist's Brooklyn-buzz affiliations and humorous bent might mislead you into thinking it's an exercise in cheap laffs for people who don't take rap seriously, but this album feels a lot more like the irreverent hip-hop fanboy mania of ego trip magazine than smarmy genre tourism." Chris Molnar of Cokemachineglow wrote: "Maybe the most refreshing thing about Shut Up, Dude is how it sounds completely free of calculation." Sean Fennessey of The Village Voice called it "a deeply self-conscious batch of word-association jumbles, references to other artists' lyrics, and half-hearted hooks."

Stereogum placed the mixtape at number 30 on the "Top 50 Albums of 2010" list.

== Track listing ==
No.	Title	Producer(s)	Length
1.	"Who's That? Brooown!"	Young Paperboy; Sabzi	3:39
2.	"You Oughta Know"		2:55
3.	"Combination Pizza Hut and Taco Bell"	Le1f; Aries Noise	2:58
4.	"Rainbow in the Dark"	J-La	3:50
5.	"Fake Patois"	Charles & Beck	4:07
6.	"Nutmeg"		5:48
7.	"Shorty Said (Gordon Voidwell Remix)"	Gordon Voidwell	3:57
8.	"Chicken and Meat"	J-La	3:48
9.	"I Don't Owe Nobody Shit"	Leif; Aries Noise	3:41
10.	"Ek Shaneesh"	Like Magic; Das Racist	4:27
11.	"Hugo Chavez"	J-La	3:41
12.	"I Don't Want to Deal with Those Monsters"	Alfred Jenkins; Das Racist	3:11
13.	"Don Dada"	Arturo Klauft	3:38
14.	"One Dollar Can"	Kassa Overall	4:20
15.	"Coochie Dip City"	J-La	4:00
16.	"Deep Ass Shit (You'll Get It When You're High)"		3:13
17.	"Shut Up, Dude"	Mike Finito	3:19
Total length:			64:32

== Personnel ==
Credits adapted from the liner notes.

- Young Paperboy – production (1)
- Sabzi – production (1)
- Le1f – production (3, 9)
- Aries Noise – production (3, 9)
- J-La – production (4, 8, 11, 15)
- Charles & Beck – production (5)
- Gordon Voidwell – production (7)
- Like Magic – production (10); recording, engineering, mixing (3, 4, 10, 15)
- Das Racist – production (10, 12)
- Daniel "Alfred Jenkins" Lynas – production (12); recording, engineering, mixing (1, 2, 5, 6, 7, 8, 9, 11, 12, 13, 14, 16, 17)
- Arturo Klauft – production (13)
- Kassa Overall – production (14)
- Mike Finito – production (17)
- DJA – mastering
- Aakash Nihalani – artwork, photography
- Ryder Fleming-Jones – executive production
