= Ashok Kondabolu =

Indian-American rapper (born 1985)

- Kondabolu inside the former East Village Radio studio in 2012

Background information
- Also known as: Dapwell
- Born: April 5, 1985 (age 41)
- Origin: Queens, New York, United States
- Occupations: Actor; writer; comedian
- Years active: 2008–present
- Website: dapwell.com

Ashok Kumar Kondabolu (born 1985), also known by his stage name Dapwell (or Dap), is an Indian-American actor, writer, and internet personality. A graduate of Stuyvesant High School in Manhattan, Kondabolu was first known for being a member of the influential New York–based rap group Das Racist. Kondabolu announced that he will eventually release his own solo material.

Rolling Stone described Ashok as "New York's stock Joe Gould-like character injected with the creative adrenaline of gonzo journalist Hunter S Thompson and the uncouth coarseness of writer Charles Bukowski." With the breakup of Das Racist in December 2012, Kondabolu stated that he would be focusing his attention on his television and radio show, co-created with his friend, the rapper Despot, called Chillin' Island.

He is the younger brother of comedian Hari Kondabolu, with whom he conducts the semi-regular live show Untitled Kondabolu Brothers Project as well as the Untitled Kondabolu Brothers Podcast. Kondabolu created and starred in the NYC-centered variety show Hey, How Ya Doin? which aired on BRIC in 2018.

The first season of Chillin Island, starring Kondabolu, along with Despot, and Lakutis, premiered on HBO and HBO Max December 17, 2021.

== Discography ==
=== With Das Racist ===
- Shut Up, Dude (2010)
- Sit Down, Man (2010)
- Relax (2011)

=== With Jean Grae and Quelle Chris ===
- Everything’s Fine (2018)

== Filmography ==
- Chillin Island (2021)

== See also ==
- Indians in the New York City metropolitan region
- List of notable Stuyvesant High School alumni
