= Bikram Singh (musician) =

American singer

- Origin: New York City, United States
- Genre: Bhangra

Bikram Singh (born 1980/1981) is an American bhangra music artist. A graduate of Touro Law School, he also works as an attorney in New York City.

== Early years ==
Singh emigrated from Punjab, India, to Queens, New York when he was twelve years old. He quickly entered the local music scene, debuting his tracks at an open mic night in Greenwich Village. Singh began exploring the boundaries between Punjabi folk lyricism and Asian Underground electronica, and he teamed up with New York's DJ Navdeep to record the underground hit "Aa Gayee". Singh performed with Panjabi MC at Summerjam 2003, when he sang "Beware of the Boys" for a crowd of over 20,000. Since then, Singh has toured all over Europe, the United States, and the United Kingdom.

The 2004 mix-tape Exclusives included a collaboration with Global Soul recording artist Shakti to produce "Do the Thang Thang," which played on New York radio stations Hot 97 and Power 105. Also on the album were the Tigerstyle-produced hits "Taakre" and "Nachna".

Singh's latest album, American Jugni, has spent several weeks on the top of the BBC Asian Bhangra charts. Singh brought in two major Bhangra producers, Tigerstyle and Ravi Bal, to work on the album. In 2005, American Jugni was the best-selling album in the UK and the track "Kawan", which featured vocal talents of Gunjan (a well established female Hindi/Punjabi singer) was named by BBC radio as the track of the year.

In 2007, Singh linked up with producer and hip hop extraordinaire Wyclef to create a track on DJ Rekha's (Basement Bhangra) upcoming Koch Records release. Rekha had actually asked Bikram a while back to do a track for the album and the vocals sat there over the years and nothing materialized for a while. But with the album release finalized, Rekha rekindled the record this year and asked him to re-do the vocals on the track in collaboration with Wyclef, and the ‘Basement Bhangra Anthem’ was born.

In 2011, Singh performed on Das Racist's "Punjabi Song" from their album Relax. He sings the hook, entirely in Punjabi.

== The band ==
Bikram Singh and the band consists of a drummer, tabla player, dholki player, dhol player, a bass guitarist, and a keyboardist. Bikram Singh has performed with the band for the past seven years. These musicians have played alongside award-winning singers and producers including A.R. Rahman (India), Panjabi MC (UK), Tigerstyle (UK) and many more. Bikram Singh and the band performs traditional folk cover songs along with original tracks from recent albums. After a four-year hiatus, Bikram Singh released "Ek Gabru" a single, which features the lyrics of Preet Kanwal and music production of Tigerstyle.

== Tour destinations ==
Below are some of the cities and countries Bikram has taken his show to:

- United Kingdom:- London, Birmingham, Leicester, Leeds.
- Switzerland: Basel, Zurich.
- Norway: Oslo & Drammen.
- Denmark: Copenhagen.
- Germany: Berlin, Cologne, Frankfurt.
- Thailand: Bangkok.
- Costa Rica: San Juan.
- Puerto Rico: San Jose.
- India: Bombay, Delhi, Chandigarh, Ludhiana, Amritsar.
- Canada: Toronto, London, Edmonton.
- Singapore.

In addition, Bikram Singh has performed numerous times in the United States in the following States: New York, New Jersey, Connecticut, Vermont, Michigan (Detroit, Lansing), Florida (Miami, Orlando, Fort Lauderdale), Pennsylvania (State College, Philadelphia, Easton, Allentown) Massachusetts (Boston, MIT) Virginia, District of Columbia, West Virginia, Minnesota (Minneapolis), Indiana (West Lafayette, Indianapolis), Georgia (Atlanta), Illinois (Chicago), Ohio (Columbus), North Carolina, South Carolina, Texas (Houston, Dallas), Nevada (Las Vegas), Arizona, California (Los Angeles, San Francisco, Sacramento, Yuba City, San Diego, Colusa) and more.

== Discography ==
Singles:

"Kawan 2" featuring Tigerstyle & Gunjan

Release date: March 2014

"Botal" featuring DDS

Release date: October 2014

"Rusiya Na Kar" Feat. PropheC

Release date: August 25, 2016

ALBUMS

Title: BIK I AM

- Artist: Bikram Singh
- Label: Sony BMG Ent. / Soldier Sound Recordings/ Inar Records
- Production: Tigerstyle, Ranbir S., Twin Beats, Mentor, DDS - Ecamp,
- Release Date: November 24, 2011

Tracks: 1. Kinna Sohna Munda - Bikram Singh 2. Beyonce - Bikram Singh 3. Tenu Kinne Sikhaya - Bikram Singh & Premi Johal 4. Electro Love Boliyan - Bikram Singh feat. Ranbir S. 5. Nachengi - Bikram Singh 6. Mere Naal Nach - Bikram Singh feat. Twin Beats 7. Mein Na Avanga - Bikram Singh 8. Sohni Lagdi - Bikram Singh 9. Just For A Dance - Bikram Singh feat. Bellringer, Mentor, Pramänik 10. Naina'ch Sharab - Bikram Singh 11. Ghar Aja Ve Mahi - Bikram Singh & Jyoti Gill 12. Yaari - Bikram Singh 13. Jaaniye - Bikram Singh feat. PropheC 14. Mere Naal Nach (Remix) Bikram Singh feat. DDS

Title: Tip Top

- Artist: Bikram Singh
- Label: Vip Urban UK / Angel Records India
- Production: Tigerstyle
- Release Date: December 16, 2008
- Tracks:

1. Naagni 2. Aashiqan De Dil 3. Ik Waari Aaja (ft Gunjan) 4. Gidhian Di Rani 5. Akhiyan’ch Tu Vasdi (ft Josh) 6. Tip Top Putt Jatt Da 7. Telephone 8. Solwa Saal 9. Mein Boli Punjabi 10. Dil Sanu De Mutiyare 11. Pehle Tor Di Sharaab 12. Ik Waari Aaja (Bandish Projekt “Come Back” Remix)

Title: American Jugni

- Artist: Bikram Singh
- Label: Vip Urban UK / Universal Music India
- Production: Tigerstyle
- Release Date: December 21, 2005
- Tracks:

1. American Jugni - Bikram Singh 2. Kawan - Gunjan & Bikram Singh 3. Akh Nagni - Bikram Singh 4. Bhabi Munda Lambran Da - Bikram Singh 5. Chaklo Gandasay - Bikram Singh 6. Kei Katal Hongay - Bikram Singh 7. Sada Dil - Bikram Singh 8. Kushian De Dhol - Bikram Singh 9. Luggian - Bikram Singh 10. Chaklo Gandasay (Remix) - Bikram Singh 11. sohni kuriye - Harsimran Sanghera

Title: Exclusives from Bikram Singh

- Artist: Bikram Singh
- Label: Anamika Records
- Production: Tigerstyle, Ranbir S.
- Release Date: January 3, 2003
