= Combination Pizza Hut and Taco Bell =

2008 song by Das Racist

Song by Das Racist
- Released: 2008
- Genre: Comedy hip-hop; pop rap
- Length: 2:58
- Songwriter: Das Racist
- Producers: Le1f; Aries Noise

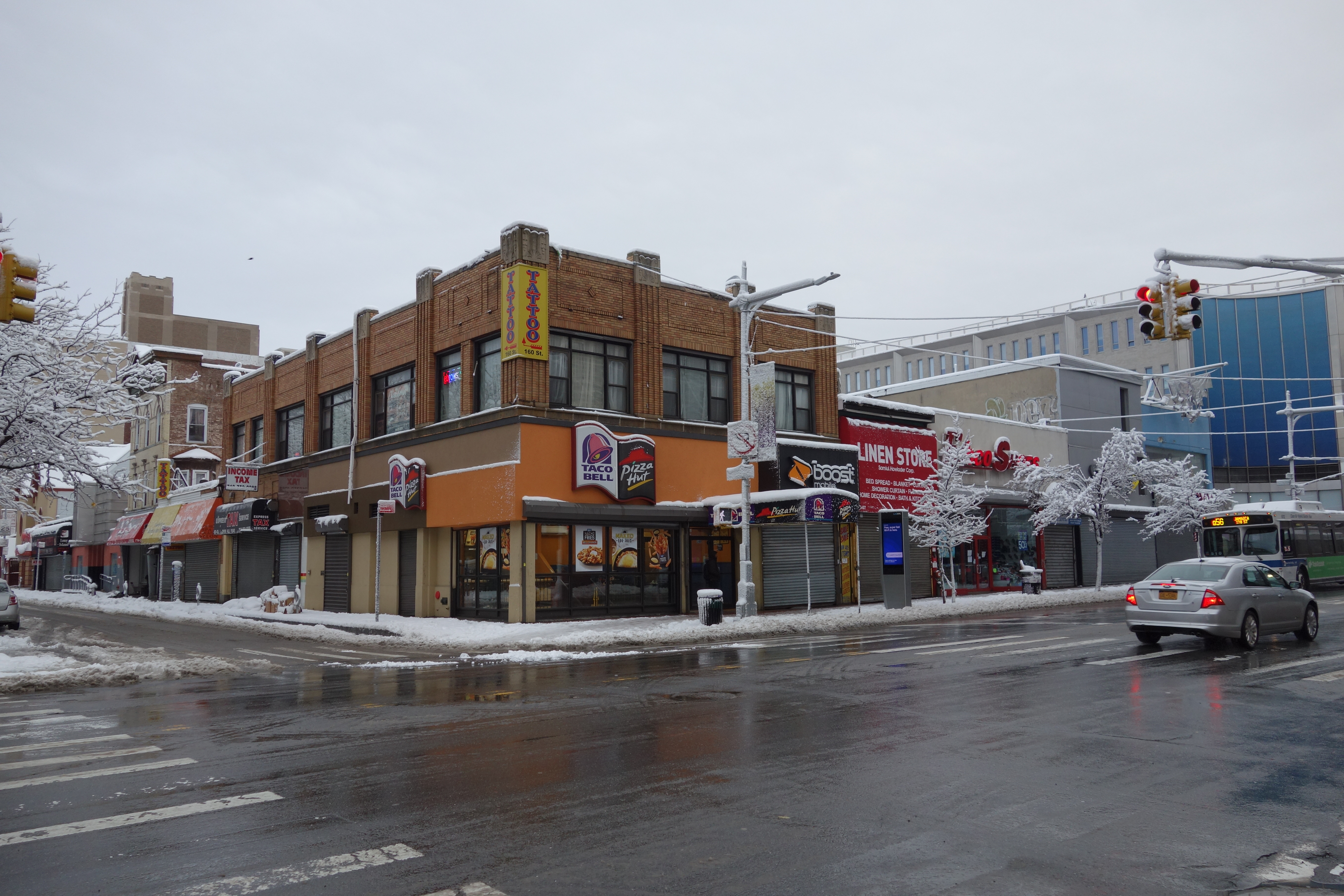
The combination Pizza Hut and Taco Bell at 160-01 Jamaica Avenue, New York City

"Combination Pizza Hut and Taco Bell" is a 2008 song by American hip-hop group Das Racist. It was first released free on their MySpace page.

The song is about two people (Das Racist members Himanshu "Heems" Suri and Victor "Kool A.D." Vazquez) on their cellphones, trying to find each other in "the combination Pizza Hut and Taco Bell on Jamaica Avenue;" its lyrics consist primarily of the phrase "I'm at the Pizza Hut / I'm at the Taco Bell / I'm at the combination Pizza Hut and Taco Bell".

== History ==
The song is based on a phrase that Vazquez had included in the stream-of-consciousness song "I Zimbra", from his 2006 self-produced album The Electric Kool A.D. Acid Test. During an early Das Racist show at Wesleyan University, he used the phrase while freestyling, and received a strongly positive reaction, so he kept repeating the line. Suri joined in, and soon so did the entire audience. At this point, the performers decided that their newly-created song was worth recording.

To accompany the lyrics, Suri chose a beat by Khalid "Le1f" Diouf, who he and Vazquez had met when all three were attending Wesleyan, and who at the time was only 17. Diouf had derived the beat from the 1991 Masters at Work single "The Ha Dance (Pumpin' Dubb)". The song has a tempo of 130 bpm.

Suri and Vazquez recorded the song in Patrick Wimberly's basement, in a single take, "mov[ing] back and forth on one mic[rophone]", as part of a session with four other songs. Wimberly, who had introduced himself to Das Racist after watching them perform the song at the Galapagos Art Space, has since credited the song with having convinced him that he wanted to be a producer. He asked them to not make the song publicly available until he had had the chance to implement audio post production; instead, they posted it online immediately.

Over the 2010s, Yum! Brands closed most combination Pizza Hut/Taco Bell locations.

== Reception ==
Pitchfork lauded it as "just a funny, stupid, silly, brainy, knowing song all at once" that "retains its inner Cheech and Chong and still seems leagues smarter for it". The Tribune Business News likewise invoked Cheech and Chong, but suggested that the song may lead listeners to wonder if Das Racist may instead be "a couple of avant-garde dadaists taking on corporate America" despite "seem(ing) like one of Andy Samberg's gag groups".

Rolling Stone found it to be "one joke repeated ad nauseam", but also "(h)ilarious, impossibly catchy and a statement about late-capitalist nausea" and "weirdly mesmerizing," referring to it variously as a "stoned spoof" and "retarded genius".

Rob Harvilla of The Village Voice said it "deftly locates the fine line between stupid and clever, and snorts it", and notes that its repetition of the line 'I'm at the Pizza Hut / I'm at the Taco Bell / I'm at the combination Pizza Hut and Taco Bell' "passes from grating to absurd to hilarious to poignant to transcendent" and is "either very, very meaningful or completely meaningless."

Alex Moore of Death and Taxes called it "both feverishly juvenile and somehow profound" and "an existential meditation on consumer identity in corporate America", praising the lines "I got that taco smell" and "I got that pizza butt" as "beautifully executed".

Robert Christgau noted its "skinny laptop beat", and felt that its themes include "the ubiquity of corporate culture, the limits of cellphone communication, how funny life gets on weed, [and] how screwed up life gets on weed", proposing that the song's success is the result of the timing of the rappers' interplay on the track.

Drew Hilliard of Vice emphasized that "[d]epending on whom you asked, (the song) was either a commentary on the pointlessness of big box consumer culture, or [...] just pointless". Ashante Infantry of The Toronto Star observed a similar reaction.

The Hartford Courant identified it as "a sort of slacker mantra for whatever social commentary you care to project over it", but also conceded that "maybe it's just a goof".

The Wall Street Journal dismissed it as "a lovably dumb slice of pop-rap" which "earned (Das Racist) a reputation as a novelty act," while The Capital Times described it as "a disposable novelty" that is "either (a) a razor-smart commentary on America's culture of consumption, (b) a brainless, repetitive throwaway or (c) some combination of the two".

== Analysis ==
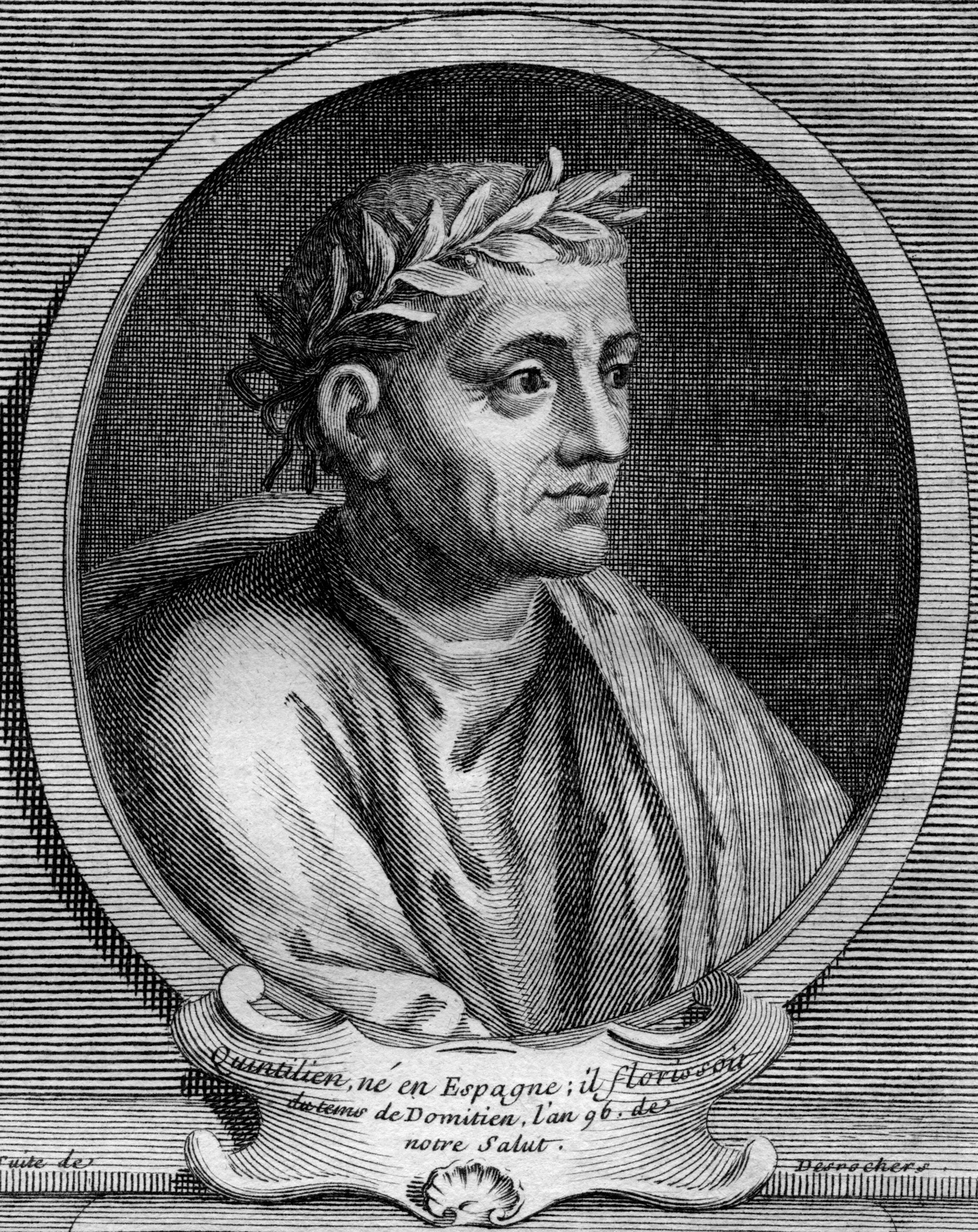
For when our audience find it a pleasure to listen, their attention and their readiness to believe what they hear are both alike increased, while they are generally filled with delight, and sometimes even transported by admiration. — Quintilian, Institutio Oratoria, 8. 3.5

The journal New Literary History called it "purposefully inane", but noted that its "nonsensical lyrics are subject to strict structural constraints". A rhetorical analysis in The Tartan claimed that the song's popularity derives primarily from three factors: first, the presence of repetition, for whose value The Tartan cited ancient Roman orator Quintilian; second, the song's use of a "socioeconomically loaded location" which enables "audiences to identify with the common man"; and third, "semantic confusion"—not only does the pronoun "I" in the phrase "I'm at the combination Pizza Hut and Taco Bell" mean different things depending on whether Suri or Vazquez is the one saying it, so does "the combination Pizza Hut and Taco Bell", as evidenced by the fact that the two men are unable to locate each other. Slate suggests that the popularity also depends on the fact that the names of the two restaurant chains have the same number of syllables: "If the song took place at a combination Taco Bell and Long John Silver's, it would never work."

In The New Yorker, Sasha Frere-Jones assessed the more intellectual and political lyrics of Das Racist's later mixtapes, and declared that "Combination Pizza Hut and Taco Bell" is "the kind of thing Das Racist might make fun of", while Andrew Marantz posited that it is "in part, a parody of the hip-hop tradition of alluding to specific locations." In New York, Lizzy Goodman declared it to be "(g)leefully stupid" but "also a subversive commentary on mind-numbing mall culture"; similarly, in The Indian Express, Nandini Nair stated that it "might sound like catchy twaddle" but is also "a commentary on the prevalence of commercialisation and the illusion of choice."

Comedian Hari Kondabolu—brother of Das Racist hype man Ashok Kondabolu—has asked "[Is] it simply a funny song about two friends going to the wrong fast-food restaurant, or [does] it say more about the state of American culture? Does the repetition in the song symbolize the Mobius-strip repetition of chains that appear throughout the country? Or something more?"

== Legacy ==
A 2009 remix of the song by Wallpaper. similarly received widespread praise.

In 2010, Suri attributed much of the song's success to the "millions or billions of dollars [that] have been spent to make 'Pizza Hut' and 'Taco Bell' the recognizable names they are today”, saying that the song "is an infectious meme largely because it references a meme already proven to be infectious." As well, he described how Das Racist's manager was approached by "someone from Yum! Brands who supposedly loved the song but felt the name of our band would be a 'problem' for marketing"; he emphasized that "(t)his is fortunate because my financial situation would not have afforded me the moral fortitude I would've needed to say no to money from Yum! Brands."

In 2013, New York graphic designer Jason Shelowitz included the song in an art project whereby he posted mock historical markers bearing rap lyrics at the locations mentioned in those lyrics.

The song saw a resurgence in popularity in 2020, on TikTok, where it accompanied "more than 400,000 videos" about experiencing combinations of various things, such as ADHD and depression.

== See also ==
- Colocation (business)
- Ken-Taco-Hut
