= Hot Sugar (musician) =

- Born: Nick Koenig
- Origin: New York City, New York, U.S.
- Genres: Electronic; hip-hop; associative music
- Occupation: Record producer
- Years active: 2008–present
- Labels: Ninja Tune; Hoko Sounds; Break World Records; Noise Collector
- Website: hotsugar.bandcamp.com

Nick Koenig, better known by his stage name Hot Sugar, is an American record producer from New York City, New York. He is the owner of the Noise Collector record label. He starred in the 2015 documentary film Hot Sugar's Cold World.

== Career ==
In 2011, Hot Sugar released his debut EP, Muscle Milk. In that year, he produced the Roots' song "Sleep", which was included in their Undun album. In 2012, he released the Moon Money EP, as well as the Midi Murder EP. In 2013, he released the Made Man EP. In that year, he produced Kitty's song "Barbie Jeep". In 2015, his debut studio album, God's Hand, was released on Break World Records. He starred in Adam Bhala Lough's Hot Sugar's Cold World, which received an honorable mention at the 2015 Hot Docs Canadian International Documentary Festival. In 2017, he released a studio album, The Melody of Dust.

Hot Sugar's music has been used in Broad City. He has collaborated with Antwon, Lakutis, Heems, Big Baby Gandhi, and Chippy Nonstop, among others. He has also directed music videos for Lil Peep's "Awful Things", Marshmello and Lil Peep's "Spotlight", and the Smashing Pumpkins' "Solara".

== Style and influences ==
According to Complex, Hot Sugar's music is called "associative music, where he pulls in a ton of sounds from instruments, found sounds, and non-traditional places to sample them into his own melodies." He has been perfecting the technique since the age of 13. In a 2015 interview with NPR, he described associative music as "try[ing] to capture sounds the same way a photographer would capture an image: If something looks poetic, I'll record it".

In a 2015 interview with Nylon, Hot Sugar stated that Kenneth Anger and John Waters are very important to him. He said: "Their influence on modern culture is incalculable and their work is timelessly innovative."

== Personal life ==
Hot Sugar has dated Molly Soda and Kitty.

== Controversy ==
In June 2018, Hot Sugar filed a defamation lawsuit against Ricky Eat Acid and Fish Narc, stating that they "are co-conspirators who have engaged in libel and slander, among other unlawful acts, against [Hot Sugar] over the course of years including recently through various social media publications such as Twitter and Wikipedia." He initially sought at least $100,000 in damages, and reached settlements with both of them in August 2018.

In November 2018, multiple women, including ex-girlfriends Molly Soda and Kitty, made posts on social media accusing Hot Sugar of "sexual misconduct and abuse." Hot Sugar issued a statement on Instagram which referred to these allegations as "false and disparaging." In response to these allegations, the record labels Ghost Ramp and Ninja Tune removed albums by Hot Sugar from their respective online catalogues.

== Discography ==
=== Studio albums ===
- God's Hand (2015)
- The Melody of Dust (2017)
- Candlelight (2020)
- Torchlight (2020)
- Atlas (2020) (with Vulax)
- Screenlight (2022)
- Creation Myth (2024)

=== Compilation albums ===
- Solid Steel Mix (2012)
- Seductive Nightmares 1 (2013)
- Seductive Nightmares 2 (2014)
- Skeletons (2014)
- Seductive Nightmares 3 (2016)

=== EPs ===
- Muscle Milk (2011)
- Moon Money (2012)
- Midi Murder (2012)
- Made Man (2013)
- Mob Mentality (2019)
- Life Support (2019)

== Filmography ==
=== Feature films ===
- Hot Sugar's Cold World (2015)
