= Ritualize =

2016 album by Lushlife and CSLSX

Studio album by Lushlife and CSLSX
- Released: February 19, 2016
- Genre: Hip hop
- Length: 53:37
- Label: Western Vinyl
- Producer: Lushlife; CSLSX

Lushlife chronology
Plateau Vision (2012)	Ritualize (2016)	My Idols Are Dead + My Enemies Are in Power (2017)

Ritualize is a collaborative studio album by Lushlife and CSLSX. It was released on Western Vinyl on February 19, 2016.

== Production ==
Philadelphia rapper and record producer Lushlife contacted local record production trio CSLSX to see if they wanted to perform live with him. The trio did not do any live shows at that time, but instead sent demos to him. After that, Lushlife and CSLSX started making the album. The album featured guest appearances from I Break Horses, Ariel Pink, Deniro Farrar, RJD2, Nightlands, Yikes the Zero, Freeway, Killer Mike, and Marissa Nadler. It took three years to finish the album. The album's cover art was drawn by Eric Petersen.

== Critical reception ==
Professional ratings
Review scores
Source	Rating
The Boston Globe	favorable
Pitchfork	5.8/10

Mehan Jayasuriya of Pitchfork stated that "While there is no shortage of interesting ideas or capable musicians on Ritualize, in the absence of a compelling vision, it doesn't add up to much." Meanwhile, Ken Capobianco of The Boston Globe commented that "The cerebral MC collaborates with production team CSLSX to take his indie aesthetic to another level, exploring pulsing ambient textures, psychedelic rock, and orchestral music, while never losing sight of classic head-bobbing beats." Tom Breihan of Stereogum wrote, "It's a blurry, shoegaze-addled take on neck-snap East Coast rap, and I've never heard anything quite like it."

Chicago Tribune chose "Body Double" as the "Song of the Day" on October 5, 2015. Consequence of Sound placed "Hong Kong (Lady of Love)" at number 9 on the "Top 10 Songs of the Week" list on February 5, 2016. Derek Staples described it as "a stroll through the questionably calm interiors of a dystopian metropolis." He added, "Here, Lushlife represents a powerful presence cast against an otherwise desolate environment, but one where surprises lurk within the prevailing darkness."

Dan DeLuca of The Philadelphia Inquirer included the album on the "Best Music of 2016" list. Maria Sherman of Thrillist placed the album at number 13 on the "20 Best Albums of 2016 That Came Out of Philly" list. She called it "a genre-bending and melding collection of eclectic sonic landscapes."

== Track listing ==
No.	Title	Length
1.	"Totally Mutual Feeling"	3:59
2.	"The Waking World" (featuring I Break Horses)	4:15
3.	"Hong Kong (Lady of Love)" (featuring Ariel Pink)	4:16
4.	"Incantation" (featuring Deniro Farrar)	4:41
5.	"Undress Me in the Temple"	1:34
6.	"Body Double"	4:53
7.	"Toynbee Suite" (featuring RJD2, Nightlands, and Yikes the Zero)	7:29
8.	"Strawberry Mansion" (featuring Freeway)	2:47
9.	"This Ecstatic Cult" (featuring Killer Mike)	3:27
10.	"Burt Reynolds (Desert Visions)"	6:21
11.	"Integration Loop" (featuring Marissa Nadler)	2:48
12.	"Ritualize"	5:17
Total length:		53:37
