= Lakutis =

American rapper

- Born: Aleksey Weintraub; July 15, 1985 (age 41)
- Origin: New York, U.S.
- Genre: Hip-hop
- Occupation: Rapper
- Years active: 2010–present
- Labels: Mishka; Greedhead
- Website: lakutis1.bandcamp.com

Aleksey Weintraub (born July 15, 1985), better known by his stage name Lakutis, is an American rapper from New York. He has collaborated with Das Racist, Hot Sugar, and Kitty. He has also toured with Le1f and Antwon.

== Early life ==
Lakutis was born Aleksey Weintraub to Russian parents. He is Jewish. At the age of 5, he moved from Queens, New York to Manhattan with his mother. He worked at the Hawaiian Tropic Zone restaurant.

== Career ==
In 2011, Lakutis released a 7-track EP, I'm in the Forest. In 2012, he released "Hey Ma, Wassup", a collaborative single with Big Baby Gandhi, Cutty Carmichael, and DVS. Spin included him on the "5 Best New Artists for May 2013" list.

In 2014, Lakutis released a 12-track mixtape, Three Seashells. It included productions from Hot Sugar, Black Noise, and Steel Tipped Dove, as well as a guest appearance from DVS. Stereogum named it the "Mixtape of the Week".

== Style and influences ==
Zach Kelly of Pitchfork commented that "Lakutis' real strong suit is the way he raps, punctuating words with a visceral intensity, usually reserved for the frontman of a hardcore band, his flow almost functioning as a percussive element."

== Discography ==
=== Mixtapes ===
- Three Seashells (2014)

=== EPs ===
- I'm in the Forest (2011)

=== Singles ===
- "Hey Ma, Wassup" (2012) (with Big Baby Gandhi, Cutty Carmichael, and DVS)
- "Motorcycle" (2017)

=== Guest appearances ===
- Das Racist - "Amazing", "Rapping 2 U", and "Irresponsible" from Sit Down, Man (2010)
- Tecla - "No Music" and "Drugs" from Thanksgiving (2011)
- Heems - "Yo What's Good New York" from Nehru Jackets (2012)
- Toothpaste - "Daytona 900" from 1996 (2012)
- Meyhem Lauren - "Carvel" from Mandatory Brunch Meetings (2012)
- Mishka & Rad Reef - "Hyperbolic Chamber Music" (2012)
- Heems - "Death Is Not an Option" from Wild Water Kingdom (2012)
- Children of the Night - "Ellis (12:06 AM)" from Queens... Revisited (2012)
- Pepperboy - "Soap on tha Block" from Nitetime (2012)
- Hot Sugar - "Leverage" from Midi Murder (2012)
- Kool A.D. - "Finito Posse Jawn" and "Rap Genius" from 63 (2013)
- Kitty - "Ay Shawty 3.0" from D.A.I.S.Y. Rage (2013)
- Hot Sugar - "Mama, I'm a Man" and "56k" from Made Man (2013)
- Antwon - "KLF ELF" from Heavy Hearted in Doldrums (2014)
- Kool A.D. - "Tight" from Word O.K. (2014)
- DVS - "Sons of Xanarchy" from DVTV (2015)
- Wiki - "Nutcrackers" from No Mountains in Manhattan (2017)
- Sicksentz - "Death Adders" (2018)
