= Lushlife =

American rapper (born 1981)

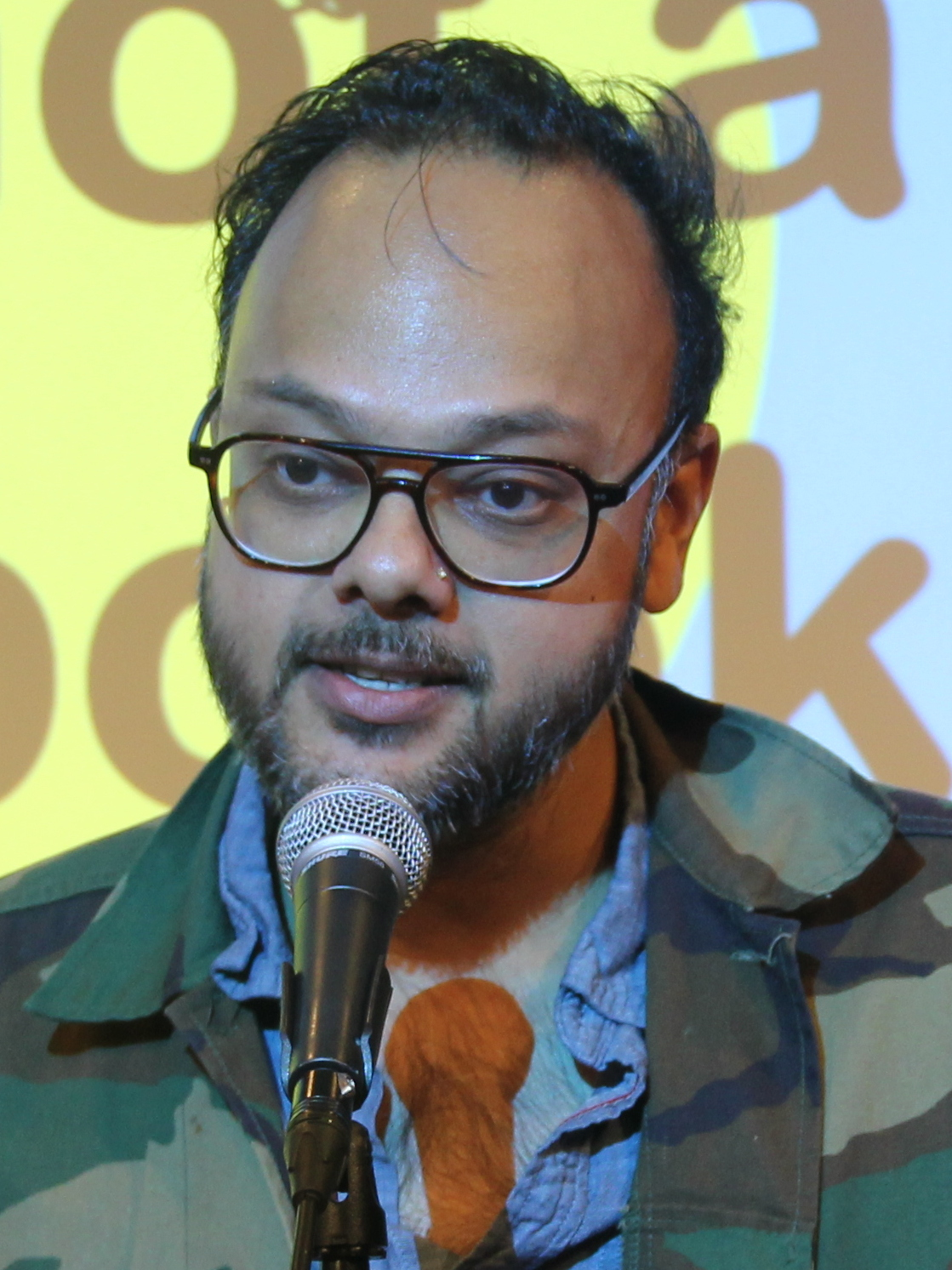
- Lushlife in 2023

Background information
- Born: Raj Haldar; August 1, 1981 (age 45); New Jersey, U.S.
- Origin: Philadelphia, Pennsylvania, U.S.
- Genre: Hip hop
- Occupations: Rapper; songwriter; record producer; author
- Years active: 2005–present
- Labels: Scenario; Rapster; Western Vinyl
- Member of: The Skull Eclipses

Raj Haldar (born August 1, 1981), better known by his stage name Lushlife, is an American rapper and record producer from Philadelphia, Pennsylvania. He is the co-author of P Is for Pterodactyl: The Worst Alphabet Book Ever. He is one half of The Skull Eclipses.

== Early life ==
Born on August 1, 1981, Haldar grew up in Glen Ridge, New Jersey. He is the son of a school teacher and an electrical engineer who emigrated from Bengal. As a child, he had 12 years of classical piano lessons. He played drums and wrote arrangements in a high school jazz band. After living in London and New York City, he settled in South Philadelphia circa 2005.

== Career ==
Raj Haldar’s Signature

In 2005, Lushlife released a Kanye West/The Beach Boys mashup album, titled West Sounds. In 2009, he released Cassette City on Rapster Records. It included vocal contributions from Camp Lo and Elzhi. In 2010, he was hired by Connectify, where he would serve as the marketing director. In 2011, he released No More Golden Days. In 2012, he released Plateau Vision on Western Vinyl.

In 2016, Lushlife released a collaborative album with production trio CSLSX, titled Ritualize, on Western Vinyl. It included guest appearances from Killer Mike, Ariel Pink, RJD2, Deniro Farrar, Marissa Nadler, and Freeway. In that year, he also released the No Dead Languages EP. In that year, he left Connectify. In 2017, he released My Idols Are Dead + My Enemies Are in Power.

He co-wrote a children's book, titled P Is for Pterodactyl: The Worst Alphabet Book Ever, with Chris Carpenter. Illustrated by Maria Tina Beddia, the book was published on Sourcebooks Jabberwocky in 2018.

== Discography ==
=== Albums ===
- West Sounds (2005)
- Order of Operations (2005)
- Order of Operations Instrumentals (2007) (with The Age of Imagination Quartet)
- Cassette City (2009)
- No More Golden Days (2011)
- Plateau Vision (2012)
- Ritualize (2016) (with CSLSX)
- My Idols Are Dead + My Enemies Are in Power (2017)

=== EPs ===
- Cherry Blossom Anthems (2006)
- No Dead Languages (2016)

=== Singles ===
- "No Foundation" (2006)
- "Still I Hear the Word Progress" (2012)
- "Hale-Bopp Was the Bedouins (Shabazz Palaces Remix)" (2012)
- "She's a Buddhist, I'm a Cubist (Remix)" (2012)
- "Toynbee Suite" (2013)
- "Body Double" (2015) (with CSLSX)

== Books ==
- P Is for Pterodactyl: The Worst Alphabet Book Ever by Raj Haldar and Chris Carpenter (Sourcebooks Jabberwocky, 2018), ISBN 978-1-4926-7431-3
