= Greedhead Music =

Music record label

- Founded: 2008
- Founder: Himanshu Suri
- Defunct: 2015
- Genre: Hip-hop
- Country of origin: United States
- Official website: www.greedhead.net

Greedhead Music is an independent record label founded by Himanshu Suri of Das Racist that has been defunct since 2015. Initially, Suri founded Greedhead Music as a management and recording company in 2008 to manage Das Racist. Greedhead's first releases were the group's 2010 mixtapes, Shut Up, Dude and Sit Down, Man. Das Racist's first commercially available album, Relax, was also the first commercial release on the Greedhead imprint. Greedhead has since released solo mixtapes by both Kool A.D. (The Palm Wine Drinkard and 51) and Heems (Nehru Jackets). The label has also released works by Dash Speaks, Weekend Money, Keepaway, Lakutis, Big Baby Gandhi, Le1f, Antwon, and Meyhem Lauren, as well as non-hip-hop acts like singer Safe, Scottish bhangra act Tigerstyle, and comedian Joe Mande.

On July 9, 2015, Suri announced that he would be shutting down Greedhead. He claimed that the cost of releasing and promoting free releases for the label's roster left him more than $10,000 in debt. Suri added, however, that his own music would continue to be released on the Greedhead imprint.

== Roster ==
- Bear Hands
- Big Baby Gandhi
- Das Racist
- Heems
- Joe Mande
- Kool A.D.
- Lakutis
- Le1f
- Meyhem Lauren
- TV Girl
