= Big Baby Gandhi =

American rapper

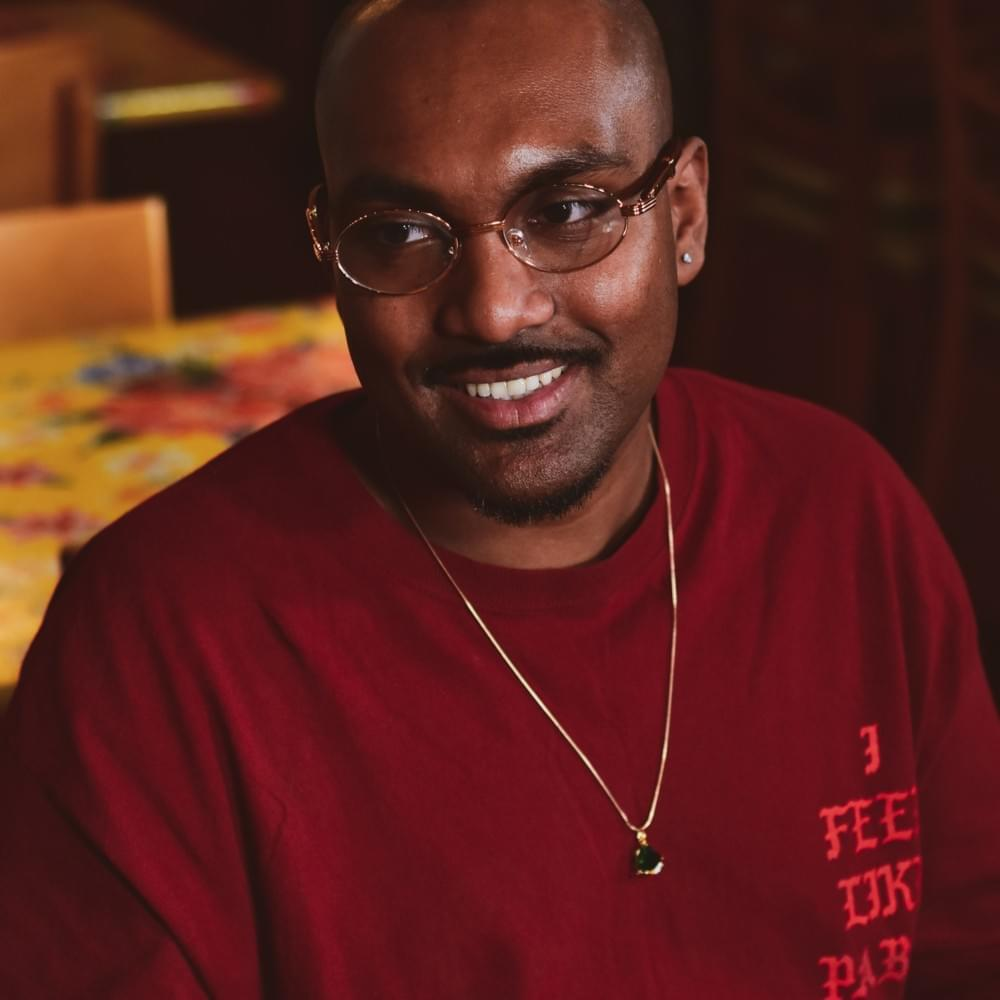
- Big Baby Gandhi in 2022

Background information
- Born: Nafis; Dhaka, Bangladesh
- Origin: Flushing, Queens, New York
- Genre: Hip-hop
- Years active: 2011–present
- Labels: Greedhead, 411 Records
- Website: bigbabygandhi.bandcamp.com

Nafis, known by his stage name Big Baby Gandhi, is a Bangladesh-born American rapper from Queens, New York. His first mixtape, Big Fucking Baby, was released in 2011 to highly positive reception from music critics. As a result of the attention he got from his first mixtape, Gandhi was signed to Greedhead Music, on which he released his second mixtape, No1 2 Look Up 2, in 2012. Artists featured on No1 2 Look Up 2 include Das Racist (on "Blue Magic"), and Fat Tony (on "Lurkin'"). In early 2013, he posted on his Tumblr that he would retire from making rap music after 2013. On December 6, 2013, he released his first full-length album, Debut. Big Baby Gandhi came out of retirement in 2017 with his release 27 and proceeded to drop various loose tracks since. In 2019 Big Baby Gandhi released a studio album We Live In A Society with features from Mr. MFN eXquire and Victor Freeze.

== Critical reception ==
Robert Christgau has given A− grades to both of Gandhi's mixtapes. Of Big Fucking Baby, he wrote, "The flow seems effortlessly idiomatic, only not South Asian idiomatic, whatever that would sound like besides Heems." In his review of No1 2 Look Up 2, Jacob Moore wrote that Gandhi's "pop culture references and choice of content falls in line with the style of Das Racist, but he favors an intense delivery more similar to Danny Brown than Heems or Kool A.D.". Pitchfork's Ian Cohen was less favorable in his review of NO1 2 LOOK UP 2, which he gave a 5.5 out of 10 rating. Cohen wrote that on the album, "Gandhi mostly steamrolls his predecessors' idiosyncrasies by making his delivery louder, and more awkward," and that the album "works best when he drops the implausible pose as a hip-hop savior and raps as himself."

== Discography ==
=== Mixtapes ===
- Big Fucking Baby (self-released, 2011)
- No1 2 Look Up 2 (Greedhead, 2012)
- 27 (411 Records, 2017)

=== Studio albums ===
- Debut (Crack Diamonds Entertainment, 2013)
- We Live In A Society (U Don't Deserve This Beautiful Art & 411 Records, 2019)
