= Das Racist =

American rap group

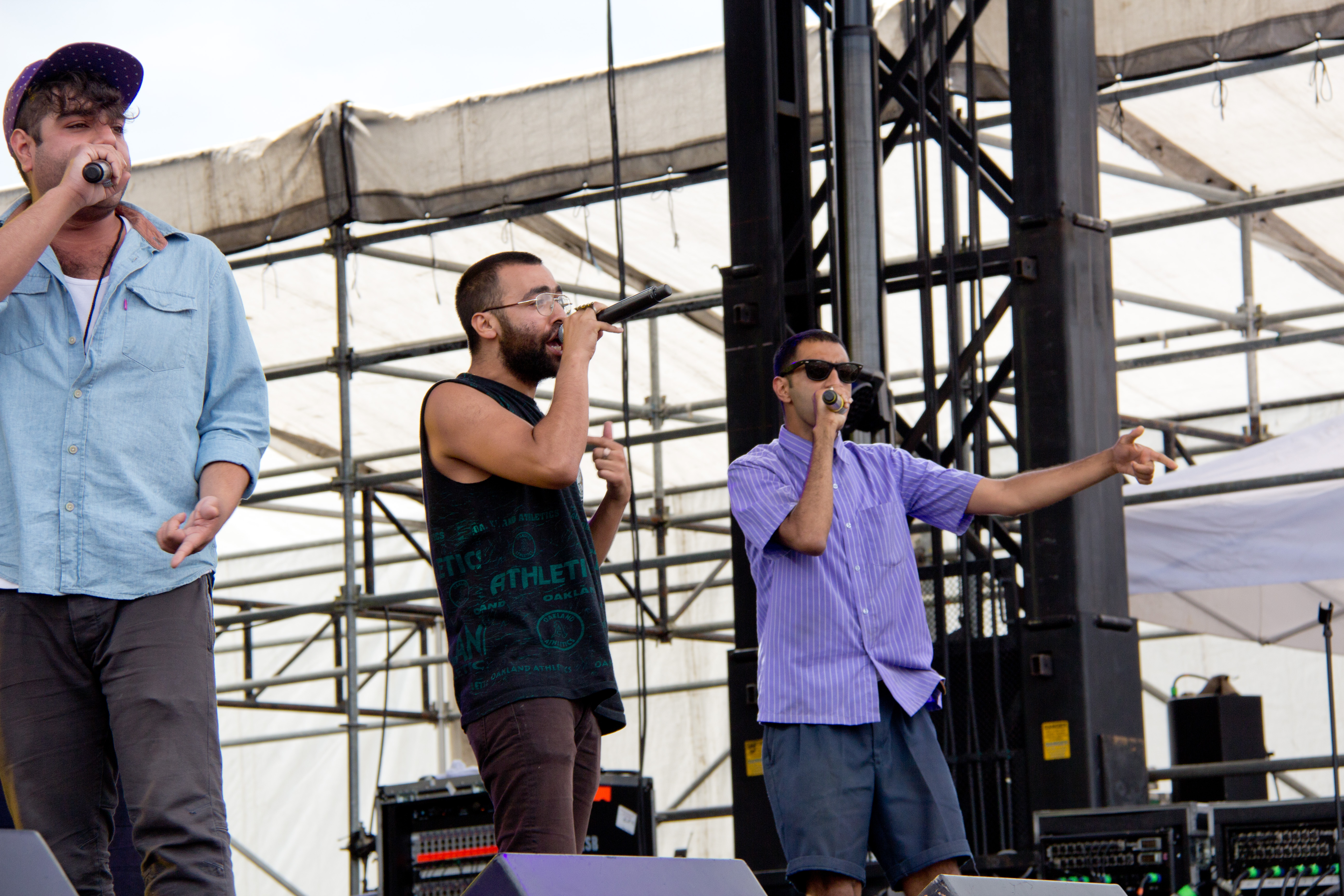
- Das Racist performing at Governors Ball in New York City in 2011

Background information
- Origin: Brooklyn, New York, United States
- Genre: Alternative hip-hop
- Years active: 2008–2012
- Labels: Mishka; Greedhead; Megaforce; Sony
- Past members: Heems; Kool A.D. Ashok "Dapwell" Kondabolu

Das Racist was an American alternative hip-hop group based in Brooklyn, composed of MCs Heems and Kool A.D. and hype man Ashok Kondabolu (a.k.a. Dapwell or Dap). Known for their use of humor, academic references, foreign allusions, and unconventional style, Das Racist was widely hailed as an urgent new voice in rap, after occasionally being misunderstood as joke rap when they first appeared.

After rising to Internet fame with their 2008 song "Combination Pizza Hut and Taco Bell," Das Racist established themselves as rappers with the release of their 2010 mixtapes Shut Up, Dude and Sit Down, Man. Spin picked Das Racist as one of fifty acts to watch at the 2010 SXSW festival, and in April 2010, MTV Iggy selected Das Racist as one of the "25 Best New Bands in the World". Rolling Stone declared the song "Hahahaha jk?" from Sit Down, Man one of the fifty best singles of 2010.

In September 2011, Das Racist released their only studio album, Relax, which was named in many year-end "best of" lists, including both that of Rolling Stone and Spin, as well as being named by Spin as the fourth best rap album of the year. Spin also featured Das Racist on the cover of its November 2011 issue with an article written by Dap's brother, comedian Hari Kondabolu. On November 28, 2011, the group made their United States television debut on Conan.

At the PULS Festival, formerly known as on3-Festival, in December 2012 in Munich, Heems revealed "Das Racist is breaking up and we're not a band anymore." The next day, Kool A.D. revealed that he had left the band, though his reasons for doing so and the status of recorded materials for the group's second album remain unknown.

== History ==
=== Formation ===
Suri and Vazquez met in 2003 at Wesleyan University in Middletown, Connecticut where Vazquez was Suri's resident advisor in a "students of color for social justice"-themed dormitory. However, they formed Das Racist only after both had moved to New York following their graduation from college. Kondabolu, who had met Suri when they were both students at New York's Stuyvesant High School, soon joined as their hype man. Suri and Kondabolu are both from Queens, New York and of Indian descent, and Vazquez is of Afro-Cuban and Italian descent and from the San Francisco Bay Area. Vazquez is also a member of power-pop band Boy Crisis.

=== Name origin ===
In spring of 2009, Das Racist (at that point consisting solely of Himanshu and Vazquez) were interviewed for their alma mater Wesleyan University's Midterm Magazine – a class project for Wesleyan's musc108 course, which Himanshu and Vazquez had previously taken in 2006 and 2007.^{[a]} In the interview, Heems discussed the origin of the group's name:

I think being minorities at a liberal arts college and that type of environment had an impact on both the way we view race and our sense of humor, which people often use as a tool to deal with race. I always felt like Wonder Showzen was a television show that captured that type of thing perfectly. When I saw the little kid yelling "THAT'S RACIST" it blew my mind. And then it became a game...to take all the seriousness out of making legitimate commentary on race, because that can get very annoying. So when something veering on racially insensitive would pop off in a commercial on television or something it would be like, who could yell "That's Racist" first. And then we thought it would be a cool name. Das EFX may have been an inspiration.

— Himanshu "Heems" Suri, interview with Wesleyan University's Midterm Magazine

=== "Combination Pizza Hut and Taco Bell" (2008–2009) ===
Das Racist first began attracting attention with their song "Combination Pizza Hut and Taco Bell". In November 2008, The Guardian called Das Racist a "funny and funky duo", placing them on a list of eight bands worth checking out. In March 2009, Baltimore-based electronic musician Dan Deacon referred to "Combination Pizza Hut and Taco Bell" as "a track that will last the ages" in XLR8R magazine. Death & Taxes magazine described the song as "an existential meditation on consumer identity in corporate America" and "both feverishly juvenile and somehow profound". After Das Racist played at the 2009 CMJ Music Marathon, The New York Times described their set as "characteristically shambolic, and characteristically entertaining, holding together a half-hour set of half-performed songs with hyperliterate reference points and self-aware charm".

=== Shut Up, Dude and Sit Down, Man (2010) ===
Promotional poster from the Sundance Film Festival for the "Who's That? Brooown!" video, in the style of Nintendo-published NES games.

Das Racist's first album, the Shut Up, Dude mixtape, was released as a free download in March 2010. The mixtape received positive reviews, earning a score of 7.8 from Pitchfork, and being described as "a fascinating album that attempts to write an impossibly new blueprint for rap: funny without trying to impress; proficient without having anything to prove; relevant without taking any particular scene seriously; imbued with a soulful sense of place—urban, disaffected, ethnic—but more interested in how that serves as fodder for jokes than in any big grab for meaning".

For the song "Who's That? Brooown!" (which samples A Tribe Called Quest's song "Scenario") Das Racist released a playable 8-bit video game of Suri and Vazquez on a quest through the New York City boroughs of Queens, Manhattan, and Brooklyn to find Kondabolu, referencing 1980s ephemera such as Double Dragon, Back to the Future, Narc, and Frogger. Pitchfork named the video one of the forty best of 2010, and it was selected to screen at the 2011 Sundance Film Festival.

Six months later, Das Racist released their second mixtape Sit Down, Man on September 14, 2010, also as a free download. Sit Down, Man received even better reviews, earning a score of 8 from Spin magazine, as well as an 8.7 and "Best New Music" from Pitchfork, and was downloaded over 250,000 times in the first week. Guests on Sit Down, Man include El-P, Despot, Vijay Iyer, and Chairlift with production from Diplo, Dame Grease, Devo Springsteen, Sabzi (of Blue Scholars and Common Market) and Boi-1da.

=== Relax (2011) ===
Their first commercially released album, titled Relax, was released on September 13, 2011, on Suri's own Greedhead Music label. The album includes production from Diplo, El-P, Rostam Batmanglij (of Vampire Weekend), and Anand Wilder (of Yeasayer), as well as guest appearances from El-P, Danny Brown, Bikram Singh, and Despot. Das Racist consider Relax to be a more accessible album, and they refer to it as a "pop record". Despite receiving a middling review from Pitchfork, who had lauded their previous efforts, the album has received a generally favorable response, earning an 8 out of 10 from Spin magazine, and reaching the number one spots on both the iTunes Hip Hop/Rap chart and the U.S. Billboard Top Heatseekers albums chart. Rolling Stone included the album at No. 28 on their 50 Best Albums of 2011 list and the song "Girl" at No. 34 on their list of the best singles of the year. Spin placed the album at No. 4 on their Best Rap Albums of 2011 list and No. 16 on their list of the best albums of 2011.

=== Deal with Sony and second studio album (2012) ===
At their concert of June 9, 2012 at Bonnaroo Music Festival, the duo stated that they would begin work presently on their second album, for which they have already written material. In an episode of the second season of A Day in the Life, Das Racist were seen recording a new song, titled "People All Over the World" and hanging out with Philip Glass and Lou Reed. Reed asked the group to open his upcoming European tour. They played on the same stage at Glass's annual Tibet House charity event at Carnegie Hall. In July 2012, Das Racist signed a deal with Sony/Megaforce Records for their next album, and shortly thereafter, their song "Girl" appeared in a commercial for Kmart.

=== Breakup ===
In December 2012, Heems announced to a crowd at the On3 Festival in Munich that Das Racist had broken up. In response, Kool A.D. tweeted that he had left the band two months prior but had been keeping his departure under wraps. The breakup came after they had signed a record deal and were to release a "proper album", followed by a tour. Dapwell told Spin, "We had a plan to break up around May. We had just signed this record deal and we were going to put out one proper album and then go on a farewell tour, release a proper breaking up statement that could have been really funny, maybe a weird, stupid video. Now, all of that has gone to shit." Speaking to Rolling Stone, Vazquez said he and Suri had been "trying to do slightly different things" professionally and artistically.

Following the break-up, Suri and Vazquez both continued to make rap music. Heems released two mixtapes called "Nehru Jackets" and "Wild Water Kingdom." Both mixtapes continued his work with Queens producer Mike Finito, among other producers such as Keyboard Kid and Lushlife. Vazquez began a very prolific solo career and has released more than 60 mixtapes since the break-up. Beyond his visual art, Vazquez played live shows in support of his mixtapes "51," "19," and "63." The three tapes, named after former bus lines in the Oakland area, feature production from the likes of Amaze88 and Trackademicks.

Dapwell stayed busy as well, working full-time on an active Twitter feed, as well as producing a podcast with his comedian brother, Hari Kondabolu. He also co-hosts the radio show Chillin' Island with Despot, and has two separate comedic television shows in development.

== Work in other media ==
With a growing repertoire of work in media beyond music, Das Racist have been referred to as a "multimedia art project". At the end of 2010, Pitchfork honored "everything Das Racist did this year", calling attention to a column Suri wrote for Stereogum about the sitcom Outsourced, their interview with The New York Times Deborah Solomon, and their appearance on "Our Show With Elliot Aronow" in which they stated that Lady Gaga was "clearly Illuminati".

After Sasha Frere-Jones wrote a piece in The New Yorker on the demise of hip-hop in late 2009, the blog Flavorpill turned to Das Racist to provide a response; Vazquez and Suri took Frere-Jones to task for presumptuously claiming authority on the matter, questioning Frere-Jones's assumptions and conclusions.

In December 2009, Das Racist hosted "Minority Fest". The event, curated by the Kondabolu Brothers, featured Victor Varnado, Jay Smooth, Kumail Nanjiani, Ali Wong and Hari Kondabolu among others, consisted of stand-up comedy by comedians of color (many of whom went onto superstardom), musical performances, and a panel discussion concerning issues faced by people of color in the arts.

In the build-up to releasing Relax, Das Racist hosted a radio show on East Village Radio called "Chillin' Island". After releasing Relax, Dap turned "Chillin' Island" into a video web series starring himself and co-hosted and produced by Heems and the rapper Despot.

Chillin Island, starring Kondabolu and produced by Elara Pictures and DreamCrew, was released on HBO and HBO Max in 2021.

== Style ==
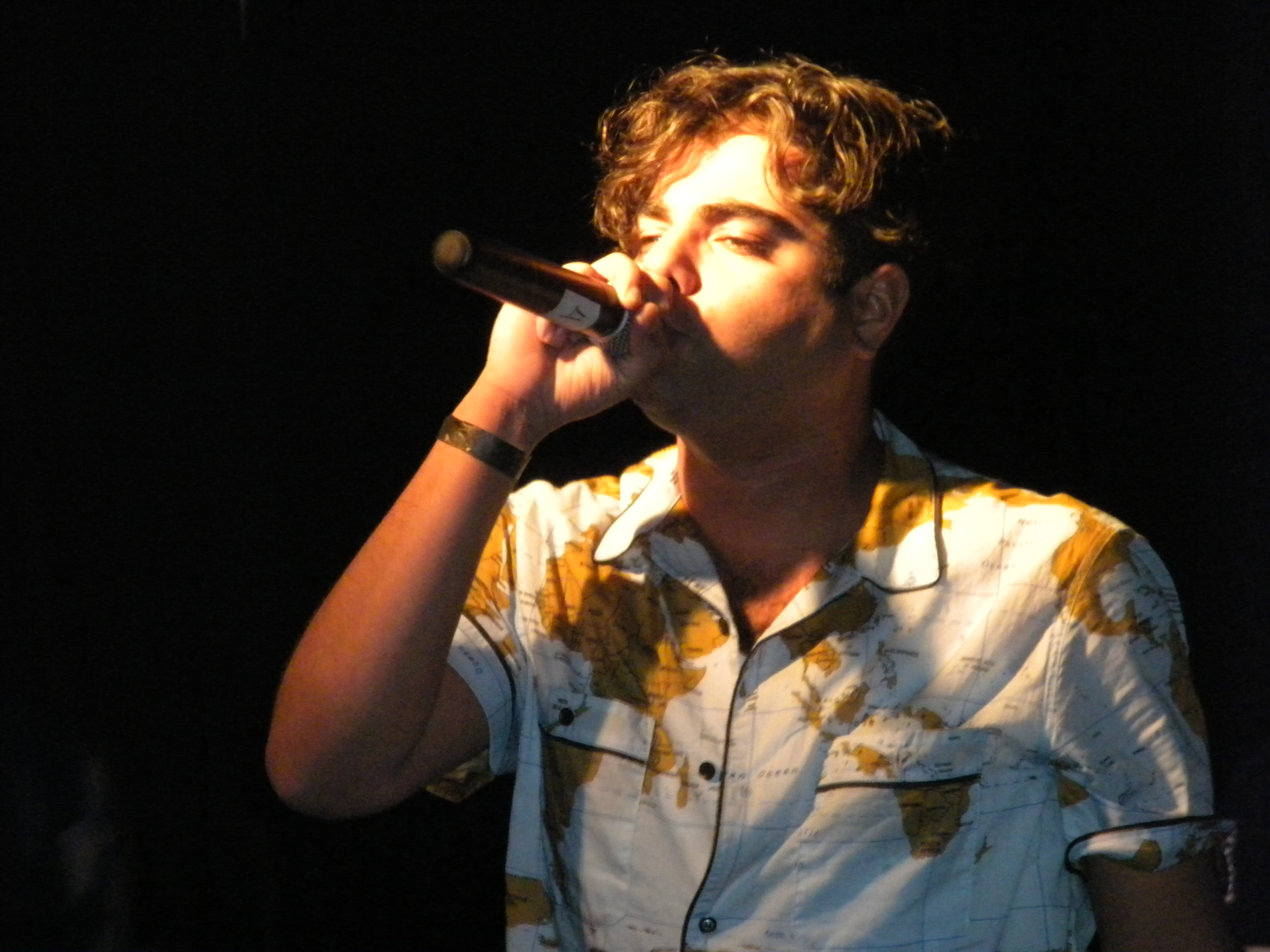
Heems on stage in Atlanta, GA, 2011.

Das Racist's unique style has a strong polarizing tendency; their set at the 2009 Pop Montreal festival was described as "the most divisive show seen at the festival". They describe their approach to music as "'deconstructionalist': sawing the legs out from under hip-hop as they celebrate it". The New York Times wrote "Das Racist's lack of piety has become an aesthetic of its own, with songs that are as much commentary on hip-hop as rigorous practice of it". The Root said Das Racist could speak for both "the ‘hood or the nearest gated community". Playboy called the duo "equal parts hip-hop and Cheech & Chong". In an interview with Sepia Mutiny, Suri described Das Racist's music:

we’re not making music that’s instantly appealing. We dabble with non-sequiturs, dadaism, repetition, repetition. We make dance music while talking about not-dancey things. We say things that on the surface can seem pretty dumb but it's a mask on some Paul Laurence Dunbar shit for actual discontent with a lot of shit in the world. Further, not a lot of people want to hear rappers talk about Dinesh D'Souza being a punk, Eddie Said, Gayatri Spivak being dope or even know who they are. A lot of people hear Pizza Hut Taco Bell and then have preconceived notions about our entire body of work that fall pretty flat.

== Discography ==
=== Studio albums ===
Year	Title	Details	Peak chart positions		
Year	Title	Details	US	US R&B	US Heat.
2011	Relax	Released: September 13, 2011; Label: Greedhead	111	15	1

=== Mixtapes ===
- Shut Up, Dude (2010)
- Sit Down, Man (2010)

=== Singles ===
Year	Single	Album
2011	"Michael Jackson"	Relax

=== Guest appearances ===
- Keepaway - "Zoo Too" from Kompetitor (2010)
- Mr. Muthafuckin' eXquire - "The Last Huzzah!" from Lost in Translation (2011)
- Lakutis - "Wifey" from I'm in the Forest (2011)
- BBU - "Please, No Pictures" from Bell Hooks (2012)
- Action Bronson & Party Supplies - "Arts & Leisure" from Blue Chips (2012)
- Big Baby Gandhi - "Blue Magic" from No1 2 Look Up 2 (2012)
- The Coup - "WAVIP" from Sorry to Bother You (2012)
- Busdriver - "Fire Hydrant" from Arguments with Dreams (2012)
- Talib Kweli & Z-Trip - "I Like It" from Attack the Block (2012)

== Notes ==
^{a}From the source given, it is unclear which member took the course during which listed year.
