= Mishka NYC =

American clothing company and record label

- Industry: Clothing & Apparel
- Founded: 2003
- Founder: Mikhail Bortnik; Greg Rivera
- Headquarters: Los Angeles, California
- Products: Streetwear

Mishka NYC is a streetwear company and record label currently headquartered in Los Angeles, California. It was established in 2003 by Mikhail Bortnik and Greg Rivera in Brooklyn, New York. Featuring bright colors and grotesque but playful cartoon imagery, the brand designs T-shirts, hats, sweaters, and accessories. Mishka NYC's most notable design is the "Keep Watch" eyeball and the "Bearmop" logo, a cartoon bear.

== Mishka Records ==
- Plastician – Мишка Presents Keep Watch Vol. VIII, 2009
- Blessure Grave – Stranger In The House, 2010
- //TENSE// – Turn It Off, 2010
- Das Racist – Shut Up, Dude, 2010
- Various – The Guide To Grave Wave, 2010
- ℑ⊇≥◊≤⊆ℜ – Zombie Rave Special Edition, 2010
- Das Racist – Sit Down, Man, 2010
- The Glitch Mob – Drink The Sea Part 2: The Mixtape, 2010
- Spooky (2) – Мишка Presents Keep Watch Vol. XXVIII, 2011
- Psychic TV, Star Eyes* & Dust La Rock – B.K. Scum, 2011
- Mr. Muthafuckin' eXquire – Lost In Translation, 2011
- Main Attrakionz – 808s & Dark Grapes II, 2011
- Hussle Club – Loose Tights, 2011
- Mater Suspiria Vision – Seduction Of The Armageddon Witches, 2011
- C V L T S / Virgin Spirit (2) – Time Debt / Bathed In White, 2012
- Bruxa – Victimeyez, 2012
- Birdy Nam Nam – Geto Bird, 2012
- Cities Aviv – Black Pleasure, 2012
- DJ Muggs – Sound Clash Business, 2012
- Meyhem Lauren* – Mandatory Brunch Meetings, 2012
- Supreme Cuts & Haleek Maul – Chrome Lips, 2012
- Yung Lean – Unknown Death 2002, 2013
- Spark Master Tape – The #SWOUP Serengeti, 2013
- Cakes da Killa – The Eulogy, 2013

== L'Amour Supreme ==
One of Mishka's most prominent visual collaborators is street artist L'Amour Supreme. As the brand's lead artist for many years, he was instrumental in shaping Mishka's distinctive aesthetic—most notably creating the iconic "Keep Watch" eyeball graphic that became a signature of the label. His work blended punk, comic book, and monster imagery into bold, colorful designs that appeared across Mishka's apparel, toys, and marketing. L’Amour Supreme also collaborated on vinyl toy releases with Mishka, such as Bootleg Kaiju and The Beast, and participated in live art events and exhibitions under the brand's name.
