= Werwulf (soundtrack) =

2026 soundtrack album by Robin Carolan

Werwulf (Original Motion Picture Soundtrack)

Soundtrack album by Robin Carolan
- Released: 18 December 2026
- Genre: Film score
- Length: 82:52
- Label: Back Lot Music

Robin Carolan film score chronology
Nosferatu (Original Motion Picture Soundtrack) (2024)	Werwulf (Original Motion Picture Soundtrack) (2026)

Werwulf (Original Motion Picture Soundtrack) is the soundtrack album composed by Robin Carolan for the 2026 film Werwulf by Robert Eggers. It is slated to be digitally released by Back Lot Music on 18 December 2026.

== Background and production ==
Werwulf marks composer Robin Carolan's third collaboration with director Robert Eggers, after The Northman (2022) and Nosferatu (2024). For the score, Carolan aimed to capture the gritty world of the peasantry of medieval England, while also maintaining a "mysterious and otherworldly" sound for the film's supernatural aspects. He utilized instruments like the hurdy-gurdy for period accuracy. Singer Ethel Cain's vocals are also interspersed throughout.

== Release ==
On 28 October 2026, it was announced that Cain co-wrote and performed a song in Middle English for the film's soundtrack, titled "Wynter Waxeth". The song was released on 13 November 2026.

The soundtrack is slated to be released for streaming and digital download on 18 December 2026. A vinyl LP release is expected to follow on 29 January 2027.

== Track listing ==
No.	Title	Artist(s)	Length
1.	"Werwulf"		3:27
2.	"Huntere Moone"		2:11
3.	"A Gyft"		1:14
4.	"Swere"		3:01
5.	"Delven"		1:47
6.	"A Child of God"		4:08
7.	"Delivere Me Fro My Synnes"		3:01
8.	"Persecucioun"		3:00
9.	"Come To Me My Child"		1:52
10.	"Hunteres"		2:13
11.	"Kepeth Thee Sauf"	Robin Carolan; Daniel Pioro	1:23
12.	"Englonde"		1:51
13.	"Y Swer"		2:04
14.	"Fenden Thee From Evel"		1:39
15.	"Nyghtmare"		1:38
16.	"Funeral"		0:45
17.	"Amen"		0:24
18.	"Cursid Kinde"		1:27
19.	"Transformen"		1:49
20.	"Dark Moone"		2:42
21.	"One More Moone"		1:31
22.	"The Hangynge Oak"		2:51
23.	"Hovel"		0:50
24.	"Wynter Waxeth I"	Ethel Cain; Robin Carolan	1:14
25.	"Is Not This Love?"		3:35
26.	"Cold Moone"		4:09
27.	"Wicches"		1:55
28.	"Trappes"		1:00
29.	"Slaughtre"		2:48
30.	"Kille, Kille"		2:06
31.	"Uncurseth Me"		1:26
32.	"Uncursid"		1:07
33.	"Wulf Moone"		2:01
34.	"Dore"		2:55
35.	"Fader!"		0:37
36.	"Evermore"		5:07
37.	"Wynter Waxeth"	Ethel Cain; Robin Carolan	6:04
Total length:			82:52

== Release history ==
Release history and formats for Werwulf (Original Soundtrack)
Region	Date	Format(s)	Label(s)	Ref.
Various	18 December 2026	Digital download; streaming	Back Lot Music	
Various	29 January 2027	LP	Sacred Bones Records	
