= The Northman (soundtrack) =

The Northman (Original Motion Picture Soundtrack)

Film score by Robin Carolan and Sebastian Gainsborough
- Released: April 15, 2022
- Recorded: 2020–2022
- Genres: Film score; Nordic folk
- Length: 74:11
- Label: Back Lot Music
- Producers: Robin Carolan; Sebastian Gainsborough

Robin Carolan chronology
The Northman (Original Motion Picture Soundtrack) (2022)	Nosferatu (Original Motion Picture Soundtrack) (2024)

Sebastian Gainsborough chronology
The Northman (Original Motion Picture Soundtrack) (2022)	Big Anonymous, the film (2024)

The Northman (Original Motion Picture Soundtrack) is the soundtrack to the 2022 film of the same name. The album was released on April 15, 2022 by Back Lot Music. It features music by Tri Angle artists Robin Carolan and Sebastian Gainsborough a.k.a. Vessel, composing their first film scoring. The duo, who had a background in electronic music. They utilized traditional instruments from Nordic music culture. including tagelharpa, langspil, kravik lyre, and säckpipa. The score was also supplemented by orchestral ensemble, consisting strings and horns, where about 30 to 40 players are composing the score.

The music received critical acclaim, praising both Carolan and Gainsborough's attempts on the approach and experimentation of Nordic music. In addition to the digital and physical album release, Sacred Bones Records unveiled the soundtrack in CD, vinyl and cassette on July 1, 2022.

== Development ==
Robert Eggers had brought Robin Carolan of Tri Angle record label, and Sebastian Gainsborough to produce music for The Northman. Before scoring for the film, Eggers sent both Carolan and Gainsborough, a playlist of periodic music which led them took 18 months for listening the album. According to them, the playlist had a collection of two-instrument drone music, compositions from György Ligeti and Krzysztof Penderecki and Tuvan music collections. They consulted ethnographer Poul Høxbro, to discuss about Viking music. Eggers wanted the score to feel "harsh and uncomfortable", and for "everything to feel like it was caked in mud and dry blood, it was crucial for the score to mirror that". The score consisted of using multiple instruments such as tagelharpa, langspil, kravik lyre, and säckpipa.

Carolan experimented with horns, which had a "lot of period pieces to have that sustained horn note being the war cry". But during research, they came to the conclusion that "the opening cue should be loads of horns going off all over the place. They're all doing something slightly out of whack with the other. And it's to do with the theory that they wouldn't have played just one long note, because that wouldn't reach your enemies very effectively. So they have this cacophony of sounds, and your enemies wouldn't be able to miss that." For the orchestral portions, he did not want to use modern strings, but as the nature of the film keeps changing, he had to write larger string-ensemble music for part of the score. The maximum string players accompanied for the film were nearly 30–40, and for some sequences, they wanted the string ensemble to mimic a bullroarer. He also incorporated Tuvan throat singing.

Violinist Rakhi Singh, played the langspil for the score, producing "amazing sounds" by experimenting. Though Vikings did not use drums, since the film is made for a modern audience, he had the "idea of having that big village invasion scene without drums, which would have been surreal", but ended up using percussion instrument as the idea did not work out. According to Carolan, "the invasion scene was tricky to score because Robert [Eggers] directed it in a way where it's almost like one long continuous shot. It's chaos, but you have to somehow control it. With that scene, because you are basically just following Amleth the entire time, we wanted the music to feel like it's in his chest, so it's super repetitive. Seb and I talked about how when you go to a club like Berghain at a certain time in the night, it's just like, "duh duh duh duh duh duh duh." There isn't a lot going on, but it takes you over and you're almost in a trance where you feel like everything's propulsive. So with that cue, we were thinking a lot about club music and how sometimes less is more and you don't need a lot to get the heart going."

== Release ==
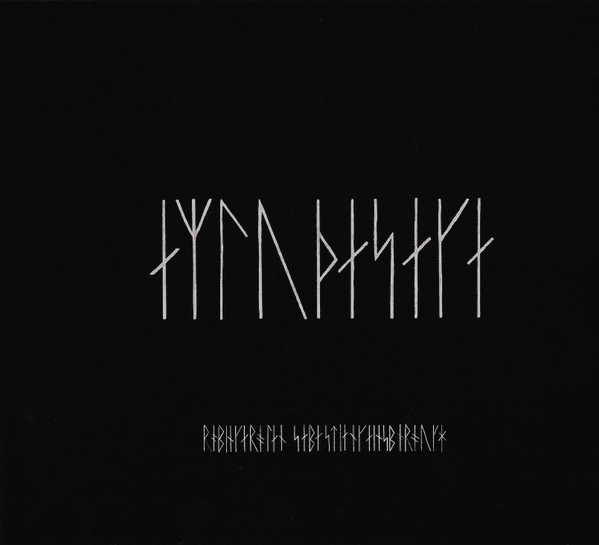
Alternate cover art

The soundtrack was officially announced on April 6, 2022, with the first track "Storm at Sea / Yggdrasill" being released online on that date. On April 15, 2022, Back Lot Music released the soundtrack online in digital formats. The album was further released in CD, vinyl and cassettes, by Sacred Bones Records and Waxwork Records on July 1, 2022. The vinyl edition consisted of a 140 gram gatefold packing, with each variant coming with an exclusive center label based on Viking shield, and a poster that includes Nordic-inspired statue from the film set.

== Track listing ==
No.	Title	Length
1.	"Approaching Hrafnsey"	1:40
2.	"The King"	1:57
3.	"Entering the Temple"	1:54
4.	"Last Teardrop"	3:35
5.	"Blood Tree, Part 1"	1:33
6.	"Strike, Brother"	2:51
7.	"Escape"	2:19
8.	"I Will Avenge You, Father"	0:44
9.	"The Land of the Rus"	1:42
10.	"A Burning Barn"	1:24
11.	"Seeress"	3:24
12.	"Raven's Omen"	2:22
13.	"Storm at Sea / Yggdrasill"	1:46
14.	"Iceland"	1:22
15.	"I Will Save You, Mother"	1:54
16.	"Slave Work"	0:56
17.	"Guðrun"	0:54
18.	"Follow the Vixen's Tail"	1:42
19.	"He-Witch"	2:29
20.	"Draugr"	1:01
21.	"Mound Dweller"	2:55
22.	"To the Games"	0:42
23.	"Birch Woods"	1:54
24.	"First of Many"	1:21
25.	"Trollish Sorcery"	2:13
26.	"Svið Night, Part 1"	1:32
27.	"Svið Night, Part 2"	1:42
28.	"I Am Your Death"	0:56
29.	"Come Morning"	1:36
30.	"I Am His Vengeance"	1:19
31.	"Óðinn"	1:01
32.	"Valkyrie"	1:09
33.	"Vestrahorn"	0:39
34.	"Hidden Valley"	1:03
35.	"Blood Tree, Part 2"	0:40
36.	"Bloð Inside / I Choose Both"	2:09
37.	"A Maiden King"	1:09
38.	"The Wolf Has Grown"	2:27
39.	"The Gates of Hel / Slain by Iron"	2:47
40.	"Hekla"	2:12
41.	"Cut the Thread of Fate"	1:13
42.	"Make Your Passage / Valhalla"	1:36
43.	"Ættartré / End Credits"	2:27
Total length:		74:11

== Reception ==
Music critic Jonathan Broxton of Movie Music UK wrote "The avant garde textures and historical accuracy of Robin Carolan and Sebastian Gainsborough's score fits in perfectly with Robert Eggers's vision of how to convey that, and it works outstandingly well in context. As a listening experience; yeah, it's harsh. There is melody and there is some thematic content, but it's almost entirely subservient to the unremitting brutality of Amleth's character, and if you struggle with dissonance and abstraction and severe (but historically accurate) folk music, then The Northman might leave you as cold as an Icelandic winter." Merlin Alderslade of Louder Sound wrote "Featuring a score by electronic composers Robin Carolan and Sebastian Gainsborough, The Northman sounds every bit as epic as it looks, utilising traditional Nordic wind and string instruments alongside booming drums and swelling orchestral elements. The result is a soundtrack that swirls between stiflingly intense and hauntingly beautiful, complimenting Jarin Blaschke's visuals to create a world that feels both mythical and palpable."

Calling it as "one of the most radical, scary and intimidating soundtracks you can imagine", Andrew Winistorfer of Vinyl Me Please wrote unyielding, immense and the best way to get in touch with your inner Norseman this year." Adam Jones of Buzz Magazine wrote "There is an argument to be made – and I'm making it – that while the score perfectly complements the frenzied action on screen that is The Northman, it may be even better consumed as a stand-alone work in its own right. The startling sound of a war horn bellowing at the beginning of The King or the descent into madness that is Mound Dweller are visceral thrills that, divorced from competing visuals, are only enhanced by one's imagination. A truly remarkable aural journey." Connor Gray of The O'Colly said "The soundtrack, composed by Robin Carolan and Sebastian Gainsborough, is filled with sounds synonymous with Norse culture that succeed in evoking emotions that can make you feel calm or tense one minute and the next make you want to run straight through a brick wall and go to battle."
