= Held (album) =

Studio album by Holy Other
- Released: 27 August 2012
- Genre: Electronic
- Length: 35:16
- Label: Tri Angle
- Producer: Holy Other

Holy Other chronology
With U (2011)	Held (2012)	Lieve (2021)

Held is the debut studio album by English record producer David Ainley under the pseudonym Holy Other. It was released on 27 August 2012 through Tri Angle. It received generally favorable reviews from critics.

== Background ==
David Ainley, better known under the pseudonym Holy Other, is an English record producer. Held is a follow-up to his debut EP, With U (2011). The album was created in his bedrooms in Manchester and London. It took him about three months to finish the album. The album contains nine tracks, clocking in at 35 minutes. It was released on 27 August 2012 through Tri Angle.

Teengirl Fantasy's remix of "Love Some1" featuring Kelela, Tim Hecker's remix of "Held", and Fort Romeau's remix of "Held" were released digitally, after the album's release.

== Critical reception ==
Professional ratings
Aggregate scores
Source	Rating
Metacritic	75/100
Review scores
Source	Rating
Beats Per Minute	82%
DIY	4/5 stars
Fact	4.5/5 stars
MusicOMH	4/5 stars
NME	3.5/5 stars
Pitchfork	8.0/10
PopMatters	7/10
Resident Advisor	4/5
The Skinny	5/5 stars
XLR8R	8/10

According to the review aggregator Metacritic, Held received "generally favorable reviews" based on a weighted average score of 75 out of 100 from 21 critic scores.

Bram E. Gieben of The Skinny described Held as "an album of contradictions: his productions are minimal and sparse, but richly layered and deeply textured, with washes of synths, sampled and treated vocals and tight, subtly-structured drums." He added, "The real triumph of Held is emotional – rarely has instrumental electronic music been so heartfelt; simultaneously transcendent, uplifting, stately and sad." Ruth Saxelby of Pitchfork wrote, "His music is of the wholly sensual, painfully physical kind, and with Held he triumphantly translates his bruised intimacy to full-length format without losing any of its skin-prickling power." Jamie Milton of DIY called the album "one of the most powerful records to be released in a very long time." Andrew Ryce of Resident Advisor stated, "Despite all the hints at depression, Held is a strangely uplifting record."

=== Accolades ===
Year-end lists for Held
Publication	List	Rank	Ref.
Beats Per Minute	The Top 50 Albums of 2012	29	
Crack	The Top 100 Albums of 2012	58	
Les Inrockuptibles	The 100 Best Albums of 2012	73	

== Track listing ==
All tracks are written by Holy Other.

Held track listing
No.	Title	Length
1.	"(W)here"	3:49
2.	"Tense Past"	3:52
3.	"Inpouring"	2:46
4.	"Love Some1"	4:28
5.	"U Now"	3:59
6.	"In Difference"	2:41
7.	"Past Tension"	2:56
8.	"Held"	6:07
9.	"Nothing Here"	4:24
Total length:		35:16

== Personnel ==
Credits adapted from liner notes.

- Holy Other – production
- Matt Colton – mastering
- Dr.Me – design
- Riyo Nemeth – photography

== Charts ==
Chart performance for Held
Chart (2012)	Peak position
UK Dance Albums (Official Charts)	30
UK Independent Albums (Official Charts)	41
