= Queen of Golden Dogs =

Studio album by Vessel
- Released: 9 November 2018
- Length: 43:53
- Label: Tri Angle

Vessel chronology
| Punish, Honey (2014) | Queen of Golden Dogs (2018) |

Professional ratings
Aggregate scores
| Source | Rating |
|---|---|
| AnyDecentMusic? | 7.3/10 |
| Metacritic | 76/100 |
Review scores
| Source | Rating |
| The 405 | 8.5/10 |
| Crack Magazine | 8/10 |
| Exclaim! | 8/10 |
| The Guardian | 4/5 stars |
| MusicOMH | 3.5/5 stars |
| Pitchfork | 8/10 |

Queen of Golden Dogs is the third studio album by English musician Vessel. It was released on 9 November 2018, under Tri Angle.

== Critical reception ==
Queen of Golden Dogs was met with "generally favorable" reviews from critics. At Metacritic, which assigns a weighted average rating out of 100 to reviews from mainstream publications, this release received an average score of 76, based on 12 reviews. Aggregator Album of the Year gave the release a 79 out of 100 based on a critical consensus of 11 reviews.

Daniel Sylvester of Exclaim! noted the album "is more than a collection of novel (or classical) ideas, as much as it's a assembly of gorgeously written and expertly arranged musical concepts, showing Vessel making some of the most clear-eyed art of his career." Nicholas Glover from The 405 noted that the album "is a bold and original statement that collides together emotions, textures and beats to gloriously dissonant effect. It’s also Vessel's best album to date."

=== Accolades ===
Accolades for Queen of Golden Dogs
| Publication | Accolade | Rank |
|---|---|---|
| The 405 | The 405's Top 50 Albums of 2018 | 30 |
| Fact | Fact's Top 50 Albums of 2018 | 9 |
| Pitchfork | Pitchfork's Top Experimental Albums of 2018 | N/A |
| PopMatters | PopMatters' Top 70 Albums of 2018 | 21 |
| PopMatters | PopMatters' Top 25 Electronic Albums of 2018 | 5 |
| The Wire | The Wire's Top 50 Albums of 2018 | 36 |

== Track listing ==
Queen of Golden Dogs track listing
| No. | Title | Length |
|---|---|---|
| 1. | "Fantasma" | 4:03 |
| 2. | "Good Animal" | 2:15 |
| 3. | "Argo" | 5:09 |
| 4. | "Zahir" | 4:33 |
| 5. | "Arcanum" | 2:58 |
| 6. | "Glory Glory" | 4:10 |
| 7. | "Torno-me eles e nau-e" | 5:34 |
| 8. | "Paplu" | 9:44 |
| 9. | "Sand Tar Man Star" | 5:27 |
