= Bodhi Rae Breathnach =

Irish actress (born 2011)

- Born: 16 August 2011 (age 15)
- Occupation: Actress
- Years active: 2022–present

Bodhi Rae Breathnach (born 16 August, 2011) is an Irish actress. Her films include Hamnet (2025), Shelter (2026) and Werwulf (2026).

== Early life ==
Breathnach is the daughter of jewellery expert Tara Breathnach and Irish actor and television presenter Danann Breathnach. She was born in Limerick, Ireland, and resides in London.

== Career ==
Breathnach had television roles in British thriller The Capture (2022) and children’s television series So Awkward Academy (2024-2025). On stage, in 2024 Breathnach portrayed Sarah in the Beth Steel play Till the Stars Come Down at London's National Theatre.

In 2025, she could be seen as Susannah, the older sister of the eponymous character in Chloe Zhao film Hamnet. In February 2025, Breathnach joined the cast of Jason Statham film Shelter alongside Bill Nighy, Naomi Ackie, and Daniel Mays. She received praise from Statham for her role, who said she "knows what she’s doing. She’s very talented, I think we’re going to see a lot of her". That summer, she joined the cast of Jane Austen film adaptation Sense and Sensibility as Margaret Dashwood. In January 2026, she was cast in the Robert Eggers horror film Werwulf.

== Filmography ==
Key
†	Denotes works that have not yet been released

Year	Title	Role	Notes
2022	The Capture	Grace Flynn	2 episodes
2024–2025	So Awkward Academy	Tam	17 episodes
2025	Hamnet	Susanna Hall	
2026	Shelter	Jessie Kelly	
2026	Sense and Sensibility	Margaret Dashwood	
2026	Werwulf †	Farmer's daughter	Post-production
TBA	A Head Full of Ghosts †	Marjorie Barrett	Filming
