= Power (Lotic album) =

Studio album by Lotic
- Released: July 13, 2018
- Genre: Electronic
- Label: Tri Angle

Power is the debut studio album by American electronic musician Lotic. It was released on July 13, 2018, by Tri Angle.

== Production ==
The album was recorded while Lotic was in a period of homelessness in Berlin, over a two-year period.

== Release ==
On April 18, 2018, Lotic announced the release of their debut album, alongside the first single "Hunted".

== Critical reception ==
Professional ratings
Aggregate scores
Source	Rating
Metacritic	80/100
Review scores
Source	Rating
The 405	8.5/10
AllMusic	4.5/5 stars
Clash	8/10
Exclaim!	8/10
The Guardian	3/5 stars
MusicOMH	4/5 stars
Pitchfork	7.8/10
Resident Advisor	4/5 stars
Rolling Stone	3.5/5 stars

Power was met with "generally favorable" reviews from critics. At Metacritic, which assigns a weighted average rating out of 100 to reviews from mainstream publications, this release received an average score of 80 based on 16 reviews. Aggregator Album of the Year gave the release a 78 out of 100 based on a critical consensus of 17 reviews.

Kyle Kohner of The 405 said "Power conjures up one of the most hectic, impenetrable, and eclectic listening experiences of the year, it’s above all, a true rags to riches story, one that complexingly captures a struggling artist on the verge of fulfilling immense potential. Paul Simpson gave admiration of the album, noting: " Power is Lotic's long-awaited full-length debut, and it's an immensely compelling work that confronts gender norms and racial biases, in addition to addressing fear, vulnerability, and inner strength. Far less club-ready than older Lotic releases, Power is often more delicate, incorporating softer textures and an intimacy inspired by neo-classical chamber music, as introduced by the nearly music box-like melodies of opener "Love and Light." Nick Roseblade from Clash said the album is "one of the most important electronic albums of the year, and luckily, it’s one of the best." While noting that Lotic "moves away from the wonky, dance-oriented music of previous releases ‘Heterocetera’ and ‘Agitations’ for an album infused with catchy melodies, industrial motifs, abstract noise and skittery beats."

=== Accolades ===
Accolades for Power
Publication	Accolade	Rank
DJ Mag	DJ Mag's Top 50 Albums of 2018	12
Fact	Fact's Top 50 Albums of 2018	1
Mixmag	Mixmag's Top 50 Albums of 2018	18
PopMatters	PopMatters' Top 70 Albums of 2018	8
PopMatters	PopMatters' Top 25 Electronic Albums of 2018	7
The Quietus	The Quietus' Top 100 Albums of 2018	81
Rolling Stone	Rolling Stone's Top 10 Avant Albums of 2018	7
Treble	Treble's Top 10 Electronic Albums of 2018	6
The Vinyl Factory	The Vinyl Factory's Top 50 Albums of 2018	8

== Track listing ==
Power track listing
No.	Title	Length
1.	"Love and Light"	4:18
2.	"Hunted"	3:14
3.	"Bulletproof"	3:24
4.	"Distribution of Care"	3:48
5.	"The Warp and the Weft"	1:26
6.	"Resilience"	3:05
7.	"Fragility"	3:24
8.	"Nerve"	2:32
9.	"Heart"	4:18
10.	"Power"	6:05
11.	"Solace"	4:38

== Personnel ==
Musicians

- J’Kerian Morgan – primary artist, producer

Production

- Jeremy Cox – mastering, mixing
- Marwan Kaabour – design
