= That's Harakiri =

Studio album by Sd Laika
- Released: April 28, 2014
- Recorded: 2011–2012
- Genre: Grime; experimental; industrial techno; glitch
- Length: 32:06
- Label: Tri Angle
- Producer: Peter Runge

Sd Laika chronology
Unknown Vectors (2012)	That's Harakiri (2014)

That's Harakiri is the only studio album by American electronic music producer Peter Runge under the pseudonym Sd Laika. It was released on April 28, 2014, through Tri Angle. It received generally favorable reviews from critics.

== Background ==
Sd Laika released his debut EP, Unknown Vectors, in 2012 through Lost Codes. He then signed to Tri Angle. That's Harakiri was recorded in 2011 and 2012. The album cover comes from Shūji Terayama's short film The Cage.

== Critical reception ==
Professional ratings
Aggregate scores
Source	Rating
AnyDecentMusic?	7.3/10
Metacritic	78/100
Review scores
Source	Rating
The 405	9/10
AllMusic	3.5/5 stars
Clash	8/10
Crack	17/20
Drowned in Sound	7/10
Dummy	8/10
Exclaim!	7/10
Fact	4/5 stars
Pitchfork	7.1/10
Resident Advisor	4/5

According to the review aggregator Metacritic, That's Harakiri received "generally favorable reviews" based on a weighted average score of 78 out of 100 from 11 critic scores.

That's Harakiri landed in the top 40 of the year-end lists of best albums by Crack (#27) and Fact (#36). These magazines plus other sources spotlighted the blends of menacing, gracious, and humorous tones, with Crack praising its mixture of a dark grime style with "heavily-grooved, twisted melodies that are at times arresting and at others wistful and longing."

Adam Bychawski of The Quietus commented that "There are two psychological conditions in particular which grime evokes, paranoia and claustrophobia, both of which are deeply embedded within these tracks." Joe Zadeh of Clash stated, "Throughout the album, he takes a dark, fast-paced and aggressive grime framework and expropriates it for his own brand of bastard brain-dance." He added, "His music marries complexity with club-ready thump, resulting in a dystopian dancehall of morbid booty shaking."

== Track listing ==
All tracks are written by Peter Runge.

That's Harakiri track listing
No.	Title	Length
1.	"Peace"	1:38
2.	"Great God Pan"	4:52
3.	"Gutter Vibrations"	2:40
4.	"I Don't"	2:59
5.	"Meshes"	2:41
6.	"Remote Heaven"	3:08
7.	"You Were Wrong"	3:15
8.	"Don't Know"	4:40
9.	"Peaked"	1:15
10.	"It's Ritual"	2:26
11.	"Percressing"	2:32
Total length:		32:06

== Personnel ==
Credits adapted from liner notes.

- Peter Runge – production
- Matt Colton – mastering
