= Werwulf =

Upcoming film by Robert Eggers

- Teaser poster
- Directed by: Robert Eggers
- Written by: Robert Eggers; Sjón
- Produced by: Tim Bevan; Eric Fellner; Garrett Bird; Robert Eggers; Sjón
- Starring: Aaron Taylor-Johnson; Willem Dafoe; Lily-Rose Depp
- Cinematography: Jarin Blaschke
- Edited by: Louise Ford
- Music by: Robin Carolan
- Production companies: Focus Features; Working Title Films; Maiden Voyage Pictures
- Distributed by: Focus Features (United States); Universal Pictures (International)
- Release dates: December 25, 2026 (United States); January 1, 2027 (United Kingdom)
- Running time: 120 minutes
- Countries: United Kingdom; United States
- Language: Middle English

Werwulf is an upcoming period gothic folk horror film directed by Robert Eggers, who co-wrote the script with Sjón. The film stars Aaron Taylor-Johnson, Willem Dafoe, and Lily-Rose Depp. Set in 14th-century England, the film follows a town haunted by a beast that threatens the safety of a man and his family.

Following the critical and commercial success of Eggers' Nosferatu (2024), Focus Features announced Eggers' next film set for a December 2026 release. Casting was announced in July, with Taylor-Johnson, Dafoe, Depp, and Ralph Ineson returning to collaborate with Eggers. Principal photography began in September 2025, and lasted until January 2026, taking place at Sky Studios Elstree and across several locations in England and Wales.

Werwulf is scheduled to be released in the United States by Focus Features on December 25, 2026, and by Universal Pictures in the United Kingdom on January 1, 2027.

== Premise ==
In 14th-century England, a town is haunted by a ravenous beast that threatens the safety of a man and his family.

== Cast ==
- Aaron Taylor-Johnson as Man
  - Vidal Arzoni as Boy
- Lily-Rose Depp as Woman
- Willem Dafoe as Old Hunter
- Ralph Ineson as Tall Hunter
- Jack Morris as Young Hunter
- Ned Dennehy as Friar
- Bodhi Rae Breathnach
- Charles Sandford as the Devil / the Werewolf
  - Emma Corrin and Tom Burke as the Devil's Voice
- Hector Byker
- Jan Bijvoet
- Ritchi Edwards
- Valeriia Karaman
- Hannah Harpin as Ale House Serving Girl
- Kate Dickie
- Jenneth Young as Sheep Farm Girl

== Production ==
In January 2025, it was announced that a horror film written and directed by Robert Eggers titled Werwulf was in development with Focus Features attached to produce and finance the film, which was co-written by Sjón, who had previously worked with Eggers in The Northman (2022). The film would be set in 14th-century England, and would feature Middle English. The pair worked with two University of Oxford professors in order to maintain authenticity. Eggers went on to say that Werwulf was the darkest script he had ever written.

In July 2025, Aaron Taylor-Johnson joined the cast as the title character, with Lily-Rose Depp, Willem Dafoe, and Ralph Ineson in talks to join. Working Title Films, along with its producers Tim Bevan and Eric Fellner, would also join the project. Later, amidst shooting, Jack Morris, Jan Bijvoet and Ritchi Edwards were revealed to have been cast. In January 2026, Bodhi Rae Breathnach joined the cast. In November 2026, it was revealed that Emma Corrin and Tom Burke had been cast in the film to play the voice of the Devil, while Charles Sandford portrays the Devil's physical form as well as the werewolf. Corrin had previously starred in Nosferatu.

=== Filming ===
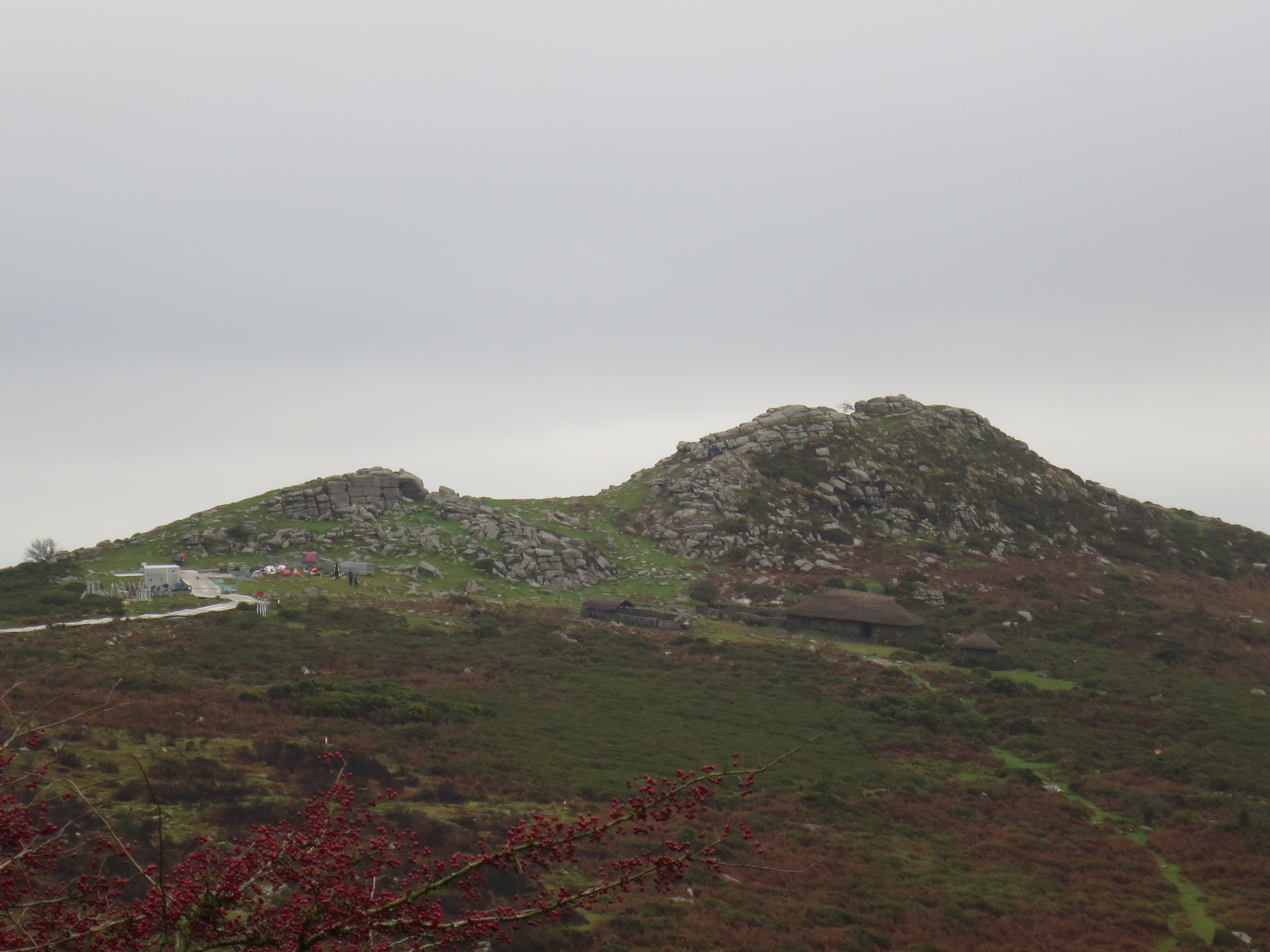
Werwulf set on Sharp Tor on 16 November 2025

In July 2025, a casting call announced that shooting for Werwulf would begin in Elstree in September. In September 2025, Taylor-Johnson told Esquire that production would officially start on September 8. On October 22, 2025, Screen Daily reported that principal photography was underway at Sky Studios Elstree, England. In late November, filming occurred at Bourne Wood in Surrey. Jarin Blaschke serves as the cinematographer, after working with Eggers on his previous films. The project was shot on Super 35 mm film in a 1.37:1 Academy aspect ratio, with an orthochromatic look due to the incorporation of the grain structure of black and white film onto color film.

Dafoe said that filming would also occur in Wales. Filming was expected near Sharp Tor on Dartmoor in the fourth quarter of 2025, with a small set constructed between Widecombe and Postbridge. The site was used to capture only a minute of footage. That November, Taylor-Johnson was seen on set in Dartmoor. Production took place in the Forest of Dean in Gloucestershire in early December. In January 2026, Blaschke and Ineson revealed on their respective social media accounts that filming had concluded.

== Music ==
Robin Carolan returned to compose the score for Werwulf, marking his third collaboration with Eggers after The Northman (2022) and Nosferatu (2024). In October 2026, The Hollywood Reporter reported that Ethel Cain had written and recorded a song for the film titled "Wynter Waxeth". The song was released on 13 November 2026.

== Release ==
Werwulf is scheduled to be released in the United States by Focus Features on December 25, 2026, and by Universal Pictures in the United Kingdom on January 1, 2027. In April 2026, the first footage from the film was unveiled during the Universal and Focus Features presentation at CinemaCon 2026 in Las Vegas.
