= Sd Laika =

- Born: 7 Oct 1989
- Origin: Milwaukee, Wisconsin, U.S.
- Died: 6 June 2023 (age 33 years)
- Genres: Grime; electronic; experimental
- Occupations: Record producer; musician
- Years active: 2011–2023
- Labels: Lost Codes; Tri Angle

Peter Runge (died 2023), known by his recording alias Sd Laika, was an American electronic recording artist. His only studio album, That's Harakiri, was released in 2014 through Tri Angle.

== Biography ==
Peter Runge was originally from Milwaukee, Wisconsin. He attended Wauwatosa East High School in Wauwatosa, Wisconsin and Oberlin College in Oberlin, Ohio.

He had previously recorded and performed music under various monikers, such as Birth-Days and Trail Magic.

He released his first work, the Unknown Vectors EP in 2012 via Lost Codes. This was the first release for the London-based label founded by grime producer Visionist.

He was later approached by Robin Carolan to release a full album through his UK/US label Tri Angle, which resulted in Runge gathering tracks mainly created during 2011 to 2012 to form his 2014 debut album That's Harakiri. This release gained him a wider audience including reviews from Pitchfork, Resident Advisor, and The Quietus. This album covered many different genres, but was described variously as experimental grime and bass music. Dummy magazine named it their album of the week. In a rare interview later that year, highly influential electronic producer Aphex Twin named Sd Laika as one of the newer artists he listened to most.

His work was sampled by Aphex Twin on his tour in 2017, by Björk in her November 2017 mix for Mixmag, and by Manchester producer Acre in his mix for Fact in January 2018.

In July 2024, it was confirmed that Runge had died in 2023. No explanation for his death was given.

== Discography ==
=== Studio albums ===
- That's Harakiri (2014)

=== Mixes ===
- Idiot Thug (2014)

=== EPs ===
- Unknown Vectors (2012)
- Mostly Trash (2015)
- Dreadful John (2015)

=== Singles ===
- "36" (2012)
- "Meshes" (2014, That's Harakiri)
- "Reckless" (2014)
- "Sanpaku Island" (2015)
- "Latent Fish" (2018)
