= With U (Holy Other EP) =

EP by Holy Other
- Released: 7 June 2011
- Length: 22:00
- Label: Tri Angle

Holy Other chronology
With U (2011)	Held (2012)

With U is the debut EP by English record producer David Ainley under the pseudonym Holy Other. It was released on 7 June 2011 through Tri Angle. It received universal acclaim from critics.

== Background ==
David Ainley, also known under the pseudonym Holy Other, is an English record producer. His debut single, "We Over" / "Yr Love", was released in 2010 through Transparent. With U is his debut EP. It contains five tracks: "Know Where", "Yr Love", "Touch", "With U", and "Feel Something". The EP was released on 7 June 2011 through Tri Angle.

The Haxan Cloak's remix of "Feel Something" and Andy Stott's remix of "Know Where" were later made available, as part of Bleep's digital compilation album, Tri Angle Records 2011 and Beyond (2011).

== Critical reception ==
Professional ratings
Aggregate scores
Source	Rating
Metacritic	82/100
Review scores
Source	Rating
Beats Per Minute	81%
Blurt	8/10 stars
Fact	3.5/5 stars
Pitchfork	7.6/10
Resident Advisor	4.0/5
Tiny Mix Tapes	4/5 stars

According to the review aggregator Metacritic, With U received "universal acclaim" based on a weighted average score of 82 out of 100 from 7 critic scores.

Hari Ashurst of Pitchfork wrote, "There's a strong sense of loneliness in the swarm of sampled vocals that make up the spine of the tracks on With U, reflecting both in the way Holy Other treats his sources and the mixture of genres he pulls from." Si Truss of Fact stated, "Each track packs all the rhythmic, low-end punch of club music, yet slowed to drag every last drop of emotion out of each swelling melody and rhythmic vocal sample." He called the EP "slow-burning, carefully constructed and deceptively unique."

=== Accolades ===
Year-end lists for With U
Publication	List	Rank	Ref.
Beats Per Minute	The Top EPs of 2011	9	
XLR8R	XLR8R's Best of 2011: Releases	1	

== Track listing ==
With U track listing
No.	Title	Length
1.	"Know Where"	3:28
2.	"Yr Love"	4:42
3.	"Touch"	4:15
4.	"With U"	5:17
5.	"Feel Something"	4:11
Total length:		22:00
