= Nosferatu (soundtrack) =

Nosferatu (Original Motion Picture Soundtrack)

Film score by Robin Carolan
- Released: November 22, 2024
- Recorded: 2023–2024
- Genre: Feature film soundtrack
- Length: 97:25
- Label: Back Lot Music
- Producer: Robin Carolan

Robin Carolan chronology
The Northman (Original Motion Picture Soundtrack) (2022)	Nosferatu (Original Motion Picture Soundtrack) (2024)	Werwulf (Original Motion Picture Soundtrack) (2026)

Nosferatu (Original Motion Picture Soundtrack) is the soundtrack album to the 2024 film Nosferatu directed by Robert Eggers, a remake of the 1922 German film, which was in turn based on Bram Stoker's 1897 novel Dracula. The film features music composed by Robin Carolan, in which, the album includes 51 tracks of his complete score and released through Back Lot Music on November 22, 2024. The album won the Hollywood Music in Media Award for Best Original Score in a Horror Film.

== Development ==
The score is provided by Robin Carolan who previously worked with Eggers on The Northman (2022) which was his film scoring debut. Carolan began composing the score much before the filming began, as Eggers stated "He [Carolan] wanted some original material to play on set… to create a certain atmosphere" which would be real and accurate as possible in the sets, so that each crew can absorb themselves on living in that time period. Carolan stated that he intentionally moved away from the typical horror score, focusing on the film's melancholic and tragic elements. He was inspired by the films The Innocents (1961), Angels and Insects (1995), Eyes Wide Shut (1999) and The Eve of Ivan Kupalo (1968) which had an eclectic and profound soundscape, while also drawing upon the works of Béla Bartók and the post-industrial band Coil. He also credited his obsessive listening to Sky Ferreira's 2019 single "Downhill Lullaby" for putting him "in a certain mood" for some of Lily-Rose Depp's character's scenes.

Carolan employed a vast orchestration, which was led, conducted and orchestrated by Daniel Pioro. The ensemble group included 60 string players, full choir, harpist, two percussionists, and various horns and woodwind players. However, the challenging pieces of the score was the music box, which he and Eggers struggled to perfect its sound, describing it as "almost telepathic". The film's setting in the 19th century, allowed Carolan to incorporate contemporary instrumentation while deliberately restricted the score to have a modernistic sound. Letty Stott, who worked with Carolan on The Northman performed ancient horns and pipes, while Paul Carvis produced a custom-built toaca-like instrument for authenticity.

== Release ==
On September 30, 2024, Back Lot Music announced the digital release of the soundtrack to Nosferatu with Waxwork Records and Sacred Bones Records handling the distribution for its CDs and vinyl LPs. The first two tracks from the score—"Goodbye" and "Increase thy Thunders"—released on the same date. The soundtrack was released on November 22, 2024, nearly a month after the film's release. The physical distribution of the album included double CD and double LP formats, with the vinyl editions included an "oxblood red splatter", black-colored vinyl, lilac and "blue incantation (art edition)" exclusively distributed through Sacred Bones Records. The packaging includes a gatefold jacket, printed inner sleeves, a die-cut poster and a "Nosferatu contract" poster.

== Reception ==
Zanobard Reviews rated 7.5 out of 10 summarizing "Robin Carolan's score for Robert Eggers' new Nosferatu is as beautiful as it is tragic, and the sheer orchestral elegance that’s displayed across many of the fifty one tracks here – but particularly in the finale – makes it well worth a listen." Hannah Collins of Buzz wrote "The Nosferatu OST is a remarkable, highly emotive achievement that'll sweep you up into the jaws of Eggers' monster like another of his transfixed victims". Charlie Brigden of The Quietus wrote "Robin Carolan has created a fascinating and challenging soundtrack as likely to delight as much as it will terrify." Tim Grierson of Screen International reviewed that Carolan's "driving score… which help envelop the viewer in Eggers' doomy atmosphere." Chris Evangelista of /Film called it as a "sweeping, tragic score".

Nick Howells of Evening Standard wrote "Robin Carolan's cracking sound, often heavily melancholic, but suddenly thrashing violently in as the main protagonist in a handful of very effective jump scares." Patrice Witherspoon of Screen Rant wrote "Robin Carolan's score is the cherry on top, fittingly haunting and nerve-wracking in all the right places." David Rooney of The Hollywood Reporter described it as a "moody score, which ranges from symphonic grandeur to agitato strings, pipes and horns specific to the region at that time to queasy atonal groans."

== Track listing ==
No.	Title	Length
1.	"Once Upon a Time"	0:41
2.	"Come to Me"	2:01
3.	"Premonition"	1:17
4.	"Herr Knock"	1:22
5.	"Ellen's Dream"	1:59
6.	"Incantation"	1:43
7.	"Goodbye"	1:14
8.	"Foreign Land"	0:45
9.	"The Inn/Moroi"	3:08
10.	"Shrine"	1:22
11.	"A Carriage Awaits"	2:43
12.	"Come by the Fire"	1:04
13.	"Destiny"	1:12
14.	"The Castle"	1:12
15.	"Covenant"	4:08
16.	"The Crypt"	2:13
17.	"Lost"	2:48
18.	"Wolves at the Door"	0:53
19.	"Hysterical Spell"	1:40
20.	"Devourance"	3:42
21.	"The Monastery"	0:55
22.	"Solomonar"	2:11
23.	"Increase thy Thunders"	1:10
24.	"The Professor"	1:34
25.	"Departure"	0:36
26.	"Sickness"	0:44
27.	"Dreams Grow Darker"	1:49
28.	"Possession"	2:31
29.	"That, is the Question"	0:52
30.	"An Arrival"	1:08
31.	"A Return"	0:52
32.	"Grünewald"	1:04
33.	"Despair in My Coming"	1:51
34.	"A Curious Mark"	1:01
35.	"Orloks Shadow"	0:52
36.	"The Vampyr"	1:35
37.	"The First Night"	5:28
38.	"Codex"	1:12
39.	"Death, All Around Us"	1:00
40.	"I Know Him"	4:59
41.	"The Second Night"	1:48
42.	"These Nightmares Exist"	1:17
43.	"A Priestess of Isis"	1:47
44.	"Last Goodbye"	1:06
45.	"Never Sleep Again"	1:55
46.	"The Third Night"	1:42
47.	"The Prince of Rats"	1:51
48.	"Her Will"	1:02
49.	"Daybreak"	8:01
50.	"Liliacs"	1:47
51.	"Bound"	4:38
Total length:		97:25

== Accolades ==
Award	Date of ceremony	Category	Recipient(s)	Result	Ref.
Hollywood Music in Media Awards	November 20, 2024	Best Original Score – Horror/Thriller Film	Robin Carolan	Won	
