= Punish, Honey =

Studio album by Vessel
- Released: 12 September 2014
- Genres: Industrial; techno; electronica
- Length: 39:46
- Label: Tri Angle
- Producer: Sebastian Gainsborough

Vessel chronology
| Order of Noise (2012) | Punish, Honey (2014) | Queen of Golden Dogs (2018) |

Punish, Honey is the second studio album by English musician Sebastian Gainsborough under the pseudonym Vessel. It was released on 12 September 2014 through Tri Angle. A departure from the dub sound of his debut album, Order of Noise (2012), it is an industrial, techno and electronica album. It received universal acclaim from critics.

== Critical reception ==
Professional ratings
Aggregate scores
| Source | Rating |
|---|---|
| Metacritic | 81/100 |
Review scores
| Source | Rating |
| AllMusic | 4/5 stars |
| Consequence of Sound | B |
| Drowned in Sound | 9/10 |
| Exclaim! | 8/10 |
| The Irish Times | 4/5 stars |
| Pitchfork | 7.3/10 |
| Q | 4/5 stars |
| Resident Advisor | 4.5/5 |
| The Skinny | 4/5 stars |
| XLR8R | 8/10 |

According to the review aggregator Metacritic, Punish, Honey received "universal acclaim" based on a weighted average score of 81 out of 100 from 14 critic scores.

Bram E. Gieben of The Skinny commented that "Vessel's second full-length album once again showcases his masterful sound design, but where Order of Noise was guided by dub and techno, this feels like new ground being broken." Steve Kerr of XLR8R stated, "One hopes that he hasn't entirely abandoned his earlier, more atmospheric sound, but as career turning points and transformations go, this album is an accomplished one." Heather Phares of AllMusic described Punish, Honey as "an album full of aggressively stripped, industrial-tinged pieces that are equally brooding and kinetic."

=== Accolades ===
Year-end lists for Punish, Honey
| Publication | List | Rank | Ref. |
|---|---|---|---|
| Drowned in Sound | 50 Favourite Albums of 2014 | 25 | |
| The Skinny | Albums of 2014 | 46 | |
| XLR8R | Best Releases of 2014 | 17 | |

== Track listing ==
All tracks are written by Sebastian Gainsborough.

Punish, Honey track listing
| No. | Title | Length |
|---|---|---|
| 1. | "Febrile" | 1:39 |
| 2. | "Red Sex" | 5:37 |
| 3. | "Drowned in Water and Light" | 5:18 |
| 4. | "Euoi" | 3:44 |
| 5. | "Anima" | 6:59 |
| 6. | "Black Leaves and Broken Branches" | 4:21 |
| 7. | "Kin to Coal" (featuring Harry Wright) | 4:42 |
| 8. | "Punish, Honey" | 1:54 |
| 9. | "DPM" | 5:32 |
| Total length: | | 39:46 |

== Personnel ==
Credits adapted from the liner notes of Punish, Honey.

- Sebastian Gainsborough – production
- Matt Colton – mastering
- Steph Elizabeth Third – photography
- Harry Wright – artwork

== Charts ==
Chart performance for Punish, Honey
| Chart (2014) | Peak position |
|---|---|
| UK Official Record Store (OCC) | 40 |
