= Holy Other =

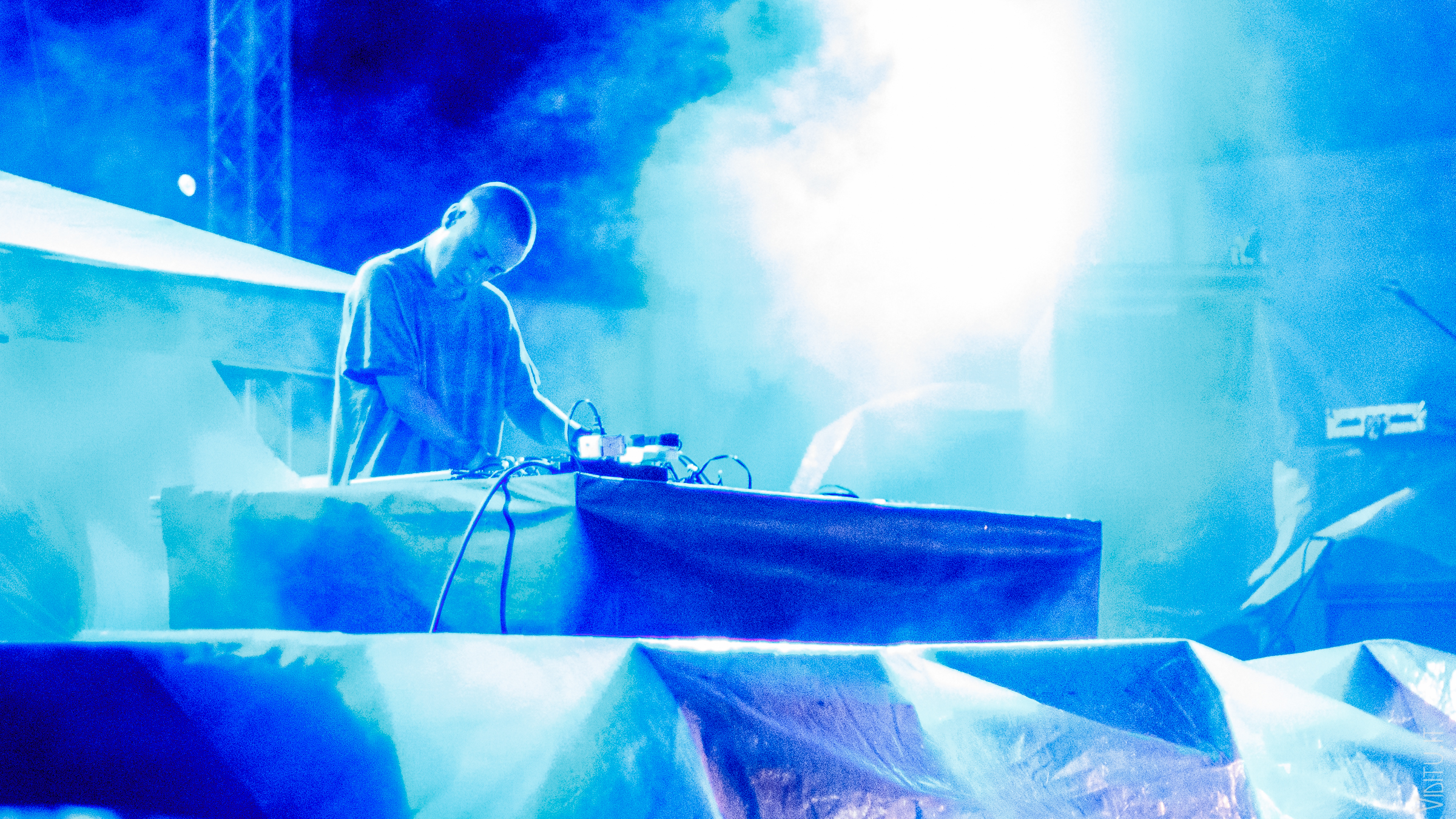
- Holy Other performing at Ypsigrock in 2013.

Background information
- Born: David Ainley
- Origin: Stockport, Greater Manchester, England
- Genres: Electronic; witch house
- Occupations: Musician; record producer
- Years active: 2010–present
- Labels: Transparent; Tri Angle; ㇹ

David Ainley, also known as Holy Other, is an English electronic musician and producer originally from Stockport, Greater Manchester. He is best known for his debut studio album, Held (2012).

== Music career ==
Holy Other made his debut in 2010 with the release of a 7-inch single, "We Over" / "Yr Love", on Transparent. Shortly after he signed with Tri Angle and released his debut EP, With U, in 2011. With U was highly acclaimed by music critics, many applauding its unique blend of R&B, UK Garage, and house music. Paul Lester, writing for The Guardian, remarked in reference to the EP "remember those stories about Prince being a Cocteau Twins fan? Well, this is what might have resulted had he worked with Robin Guthrie or Kevin Shields", while Marc Hogan, in his review for Spin Magazine wrote that the EP "blasts through not only genres, but the divide between the otherworldly and the physical”.

Despite the early hype, Holy Other immediately developed a reputation for being a particularly elusive and private artist, rarely divulging personal details about himself and preferring not to be photographed or filmed during interviews. In an interview with Stereogum, he explained the mystery surrounding him as a by-product of intense stage fright and an initial desire to keep the project as faceless as possible for as long as possible.

In 2012 Holy Other released his debut album, Held, again, on Tri Angle Records. The album garnered very positive reviews and was featured on numerous Best Of lists that year. Ruth Saxelby, in her eight-out-of-ten review for Pitchfork stated "his music is of the wholly sensual, painfully physical kind, and with Held he triumphantly translates his bruised intimacy to full-length format without losing any of its skin-prickling power”. In a nine-out-of ten review Mixmag assessed that the album acted "as the perfect catalyst for moments of intense intimacy" and in another nine-out-of-ten review FACT Magazine concluded that "in both musical and studio accomplishment Holy Other has come into his own as a strong, individual, musical voice". Around this time Holy Other was widely recognised as being one of the more important artists in the then fledgling alternative R&B scene, although Holy Other himself has never stated any affiliation with the genre. In support of Held Holy Other performed at numerous music festivals around the world and also toured with artists including Beach House, Amon Tobin, and Lucky Dragons.

In 2021 Holy Other returned, releasing the eponymous single from the album 'Lieve', which followed on 19 November 2021 on his own imprint 'ㇹ'. This marked the end of a four year absence from touring, releasing, press or social media. Lieve follows 2012’s Held as his first LP in 9 years. Holy Other recorded Lieve throughout 2020 in the northwest of England, using the acoustics of Bidston Observatory atop Bidston Hill on the Wirral, including its geometrically perfect wooden domes to capture the groundwork for the record. This includes vocals from Nyx’s Sian O’Gorman, violin from Simmy Singh, and saxophone from Daniel Thorne.

The record, and more broadly Holy Other's return has been positively welcomed by critics and audiences alike, "The elusive producer delivers his signature sound of mesmerizing downtempo electronica, this time more deconstructed, polished and darker than ever before, often drifting towards a sonic territory located somewhere between Haxan Cloak's Latitudes record and "Double Negative" from Low. It's a stunning comeback from one of the most iconic faces of the Tri Angle, that will undoubtedly end up on many end-of-year lists."

In their 8/10 review for The Line of Best Fit, Jack Bray describes the Holy Other's Lieve as "Artfully exploring intimacy, loss, past and present, his work remains eerily immortal; utterly of its time but also defiantly modern." Noting "Holy Other is a critical voice in a world that’s become emotionally remote and his latest record is monument to that fact. Speaking to a humanity that few producers can replicate, Lieve proves that Holy Other’s efforts are just as essential in 2021 as they were in 2012."

In another 8/10 review, Mat Smith of Clash (magazine) concludes "As the final moments of ‘Bough Down’ play out, Ainley’s sleight-of-hand in The sequencing of his second Holy Other album is revealed, leaving the listener experiencing a cautious fragility and subversive, timeless sense of purpose."

== Discography ==
=== Studio albums ===
- Held (Tri Angle, 2012)
- Lieve (ㇹ, 2021)

=== EPs ===
- With U (Tri Angle, 2011)

=== Singles ===
- "We Over" / "Yr Love" (Transparent, 2010)
