= Shelter (2026 film) =

- Theatrical release poster
- Directed by: Ric Roman Waugh
- Written by: Ward Parry
- Produced by: Jason Statham; John Friedberg; Brendon Boyea; Jon Berg; Greg Silverman
- Starring: Jason Statham; Bodhi Rae Breathnach; Naomi Ackie; Daniel Mays; Harriet Walter; Bill Nighy
- Cinematography: Martin Ahlgren
- Edited by: Matthew Newman
- Music by: David Buckley
- Production companies: Punch Palace Productions; Cinemachine; Stampede Ventures
- Distributed by: Black Bear Pictures
- Release dates: January 20, 2026 (Cineworld Leicester Square); January 30, 2026 (United States and United Kingdom)
- Running time: 107 minutes
- Countries: United Kingdom; United States
- Language: English
- Budget: $50 million
- Box office: $54.6 million

Shelter is a 2026 action thriller film starring Jason Statham as a former British government assassin living in isolation off the coast of Scotland who is forced back into violent confrontation with his past while protecting a young girl from the agency determined to eliminate him. It is directed by Ric Roman Waugh and written by Ward Parry. The film also stars Bodhi Rae Breathnach, Bill Nighy, Naomi Ackie, and Daniel Mays.

Shelter premiered at the Cineworld Leicester Square in London on January 20, 2026, and was released in the United Kingdom and United States by Black Bear Pictures on January 30, 2026. The film received mixed reviews from critics and grossed $54.6 million against a $50 million production budget.

== Plot ==
Former MI6 "Black Kite" assassin Michael Mason lives alone on a remote island in the Scottish Outer Hebrides. Every week, he receives supplies from teenager Jessie and her uncle, who Mason served with in the Royal Marines. When a storm kills her uncle and throws Jessie overboard, Mason rescues her and they bond as she recovers at his home.

Stephen Manafort, the Chief of MI6 and Mason's former handler, is questioned in a public inquiry about Total Human Engagement Analytics (THEA), an advanced surveillance program being investigated for illegal monitoring of British citizens. Prime Minister Fordham, who supports THEA, arranges for Manafort to be replaced by his deputy, Roberta Frost, so he can discreetly conduct black-ops outside of MI6's control. Mason is captured on camera buying supplies in Stornoway, but THEA identifies him as terrorist Timur Tchermoev, subject to a kill order. This prompts Frost to dispatch a tactical team, but Mason kills them using booby traps. Frost discovers Mason's true identity and that he has been in hiding for betraying Manafort after refusing to kill an Iranian nuclear program defector ten years prior. She learns that Manafort lied to her, saying Mason betrayed MI6; in reality, he was trying to protect the defector. Manafort had put Mason under Tchermoev's name to uncover him. He discreetly orders James Workman, another Black Kite operative, to kill both Mason and Jessie, despite Jessie being a civilian.

Mason and Jessie escape to mainland Scotland but are attacked by Workman. Fleeing from him, Mason takes Jessie to his friend Arthur Booth, the former MI6 systems architect who created THEA, believing he can safely leave her there and go into hiding again. However, Booth is dying from cancer and is unable to take care of Jessie. Mason decides his last resort is MI6 informant and human trafficker Kamal Shah. Workman attacks Booth's house, forcing the three to escape.

Mason and Jessie drive to Kamal's nightclub in the Isle of Dogs, London, to secure her safe passage. After warning Kamal that Manafort is no longer constrained by MI6 and poses a danger to them both, he agrees to give Jessie a new identity and move her to Spain on the condition that Mason kills Manafort. Mason kills Manafort's Black Kite operatives at the club, disarms Frost's team, and gets Jessie to the docks. Though she begs Mason to join her, they are ambushed by Workman; Mason gets Jessie on the boat and kills Workman after a brutal fight.

Mason confronts Manafort at his private estate for his actions and is berated for breaking the most important rule in Black Kites: unconditional loyalty. Mason responds that finding his humanity after a life of obedience is why he is still alive before shooting Manafort dead. Three months later, Roberta wishes to bring Mason in and has Jessie under surveillance. In Ronda, Jessie sits in a café and receives a chess piece from Mason, who is still in hiding. He overlooks her from the street before walking away.

== Cast ==
- Jason Statham as Michael Mason, a former Royal Marines Commando, SBS operator and assassin for MI6's Black Kite division
- Bodhi Rae Breathnach as Jessie Kelly, the niece of Mason's friend he ends up protecting
- Bill Nighy as Stephen Manafort, the recently ousted Chief of MI6 and Mason's former handler
- Naomi Ackie as Roberta Frost, the Acting Chief of MI6 and Manafort's former deputy
- Daniel Mays as Arthur Booth, Mason's friend and a former MI6 systems architect for the THEA program
- Céline Buckens as Maddison, a senior MI6 analyst for the THEA program who works closely with Frost
- Bally Gill as Aziz, an MI6 official and head of the THEA operations room
- Anna Crilly as Haneron, the chair of a public inquiry into the THEA program
- Harriet Walter as Fordham, the Prime Minister and a close ally of Manafort
- Bryan Vigier as James Workman, an assassin in the MI6 Black Kite division
- Michael Shaeffer as Jessie's uncle, Mason's old friend from the Royal Marines
- Tom Wu as Kamal Shah, a human trafficker, nightclub owner and MI6 informant

== Production ==
At the 2024 Cannes Film Market, Black Bear Pictures was selling an untitled action film written by Ward Perry and starring Jason Statham. At the time, Baltasar Kormákur was attached to direct, and filming was planned for the UK and Iceland. By February 2025, Ric Roman Waugh replaced Kormákur as director, and principal photography had begun in the United Kingdom and Ireland. Bodhi Rae Breathnach, Bill Nighy, Naomi Ackie, and Daniel Mays had also joined the cast. Filming took place in Enniskerry in March 2025. The film's title was revealed as Shelter in October 2025.

== Release ==
=== Theatrical ===
Shelter had its world premiere at the Cineworld Leicester Square in London on January 20, 2026, and was released in the United States on January 30, 2026.

=== Home media ===
The film was released in Blu-Ray in 2026.

== Reception ==
=== Box office ===
Shelter grossed $12.8 million in the United States and Canada, and $41.8 million in other territories, for a worldwide total of $54.6 million.

In the United States and Canada, Shelter was released alongside Send Help, Iron Lung, and Melania on January 30, 2026. It grossed $5,531,028 from 2,726 theatres and closed its domestic run with $12,805,541.

=== Critical reception ===
On the review aggregator website Rotten Tomatoes, 64% of 119 critics' reviews are positive, with an average rating of 5.7/10. The website's consensus reads: "Classing up an overdone premise with professional execution, Shelter is highly derivative of previous Jason Statham vehicles but lean and mean enough to forgive the recycled tropes." Metacritic, which uses a weighted average, assigned the film a score of 50 out of 100, based on 23 critics, indicating "mixed or average" reviews. Audiences polled by CinemaScore gave the film an average grade of "B+" on an A+ to F scale.
