= Virtual Anticipation =

Studio album by Ben Aqua
- Released: February 18, 2014
- Recorded: 2011–2014
- Genre: Electronic; Synthpop
- Length: 42:42
- Label: #FEELINGS
- Producer: Ben Aqua

Virtual Anticipation is the first studio album by American artist Ben Aqua. It was released as a digital album on February 18, 2014 through #FEELINGS.

== Background ==
Virtual Anticipation was in production for over three years, and included the title track from Aqua's debut EP, Reset Yourself. He described the album concept as "loosely about a sense of anxiety, happiness, fear, alienation and excitement I've felt as a result of years of endlessly analyzing how the Internet and technology are influencing ideas of self-identity, sexuality, privacy, 'immortality,' and fantasy". The album was composed of audio samples from field recordings, Nintendo DS, YouTube videos, and iPad synthesizer apps.

Virtual Anticipation was musically influenced by Frédéric Chopin, Wendy Carlos, Yellow Magic Orchestra, Sega Genesis, Timbaland, and RP Boo.

== Reception ==
In a 2014 interview with Ben Aqua, VICE Thump called Virtual Anticipation "an opus that taps everything from footwork and club to seapunk and skweee, and pulls it all together with a post-human outlook". They described the album as having a "combination of classical elements and up-to-the-minute synth sounds".

== Track listing ==
All music is composed by Ben Aqua, except where noted.

No.	Title	Length
1.	"We're All Baroque"	1:14
2.	"Virtual Anticipation"	4:42
3.	"Eternal Hard Drive"	2:41
4.	"Ultimate Reality"	4:23
5.	"Melted Memories"	3:44
6.	"4C1D"	4:32
7.	"Drip Hop"	3:09
8.	"Reset Yourself"	3:28
9.	"Organic Blueprint"	1:33
10.	"Dark, Dark Day"	6:00
11.	"Just B U"	3:16
12.	"Neverending Beginning"	4:08
Total length:		42:42

== Personnel ==
- Ben Aqua - producer, mixing, audio mastering, artwork

=== Guest collaborators ===
- Joe Howe - synthesizer solo on "Virtual Anticipation"
- Ojay Morgan (Zebra Katz) - vocals on "Ultimate Reality"
- Christa Palozzolo - vocals on "Neverending Beginning"
