= Vessel (solo artist) =

English music producer and composer

- Born: Sebastian Gainsborough
- Origin: Bristol, England
- Genres: Electronic; instrumental; avant-garde
- Occupations: Composer; producer
- Years active: 2010–present
- Labels: Tri Angle; Sacred Bones; Paplu; Liberation Technologies; Left_Blank
- Website: sebgainsborough.com

Vessel, also known as Sebastian Gainsborough, is an English music producer and composer from Bristol, England.

== Career ==
Vessel began his career as a producer of bass driven, experimental electronica both as a solo artist as well as under numerous guises alongside and as part of Bristol's 'Young Echo' Collective, most notably as a member of Killing Sound.

Following a number of limited 12" EP releases with London label Left Blank and an EP on Mute Records subsidiary, Liberation Technologies, Gainsborough's 'Vessel' solo output has been released by Tri Angle.

His trio of albums on Tri Angle, Order of Noise, Punish, Honey and Queen of Golden Dogs have received positive reviews.

Alongside his studio album releases, Gainsborough has over recent years become increasingly known for his collaborative practice, especially concerning his collaboration with both classical instrumentalists and AV artists. Notably, he has collaborated extensively with visual artist Pedro Maia, contemporary classical collectives Immix Ensemble and Manchester Collective, violinist Rakhi Singh and visual artist Anouk De Clercq. He premiered Written in Fire with Rakhi Singh at King's Place in 2019.

In July 2020 Gainsborough announced the launch of a new music imprint 'Paplu' in partnership with Rakhi Singh. To mark this, a new edit of 2014's "Red Sex" was released featuring Singh on viola and violin. This was followed up by Passion in November 2020, a long form work for strings, electronics and voice, launching with a video by Pedro Maia.

On April 12, 2022, it was announced that Gainsborough co-composed the score for Robert Eggers Viking film, The Northman with Robin Carolan, which released the following week in the UK, with its US cinematic release the following week.

The soundtrack was praised in reviews, LA Weekly writing that "Every frame of Jarin Blaschke's cinematography is a carefully rendered baroque painting, while the score by Robin Carolan and Sebastian Gainsborough pushes us deeper into the ether with transcendent rhythms and primordial drums".

Empire, in their five star review said of the score, "Long takes like these, accompanied by composers Robin Carolan and Sebastian Gainsborough’s pulsating score, throbbing with drumbeats and low notes, emphasise the savage spectacle and unforgiving harshness of these times, but also the powerful physicality of Skarsgård" and IGN "The music, by Robin Carolan and Sebastian Gainsborough, is absolutely key, veering between folk-like strings that evoke King Aurvandill's regality as he returns from war, and percussions so heavy — during murkier and more spiritual segments — that with the right theatrical sound system, the bass is sure to rattle your ribcage."

The soundtrack was released digitally by Backlot Music coinciding with the cinematic release on April 22, and on tape, CD and various vinyl editions by Sacred Bones Records on July 22.

In November 2022, Fever Ray announced their new single, "Carbon Dioxide", a co-production between Karin Dreijer (Fever Ray) and Vessel. The single was released ahead of Fever Ray's 2023 album Radical Romantics, which also featured Olof Dreijer, Nídia, Peder Mannerfelt, Trent Reznor and Atticus Ross.

== Discography ==
=== Albums ===
2012	Order of Noise (Tri Angle)
2014	Punish, Honey (Tri Angle)
2018	Queen of Golden Dogs (Tri Angle)

=== EPs ===
2010	VeElSkSiEdL with El Kid (Astro:Dynamics)
2011	Wax Dance (A Future Without)
2011	Nylon Sunset (Left Blank)
2012	Standard (Left Blank)
2013	Misery Is A Communicable Disease (Liberation Technologies)
2016	Transition with Immix Ensemble (Erased Tapes Records)
2020	Passion (Paplu)

=== Singles ===
2014	"Red Sex" (Tri Angle Records)
2018	"Paplu (Love That Moves The Sun)" (Tri Angle Records)
2020	"Red Sex (Re-Strung)" ft. Rakhi Singh (Paplu)

=== Remixes and production ===
2012	Liars - "Brats" (Vessel Elliptic Remix)
2013	El Kid - "We Need Mirrors" (Vessel Psychosis Mix)
2013	El Perro del Mar - "Hold Off the Dawn" (Vessel Remix)
2013	Hyetal - "Northwest Passage" (Vessel Remix)
2013	Ike Yard - "Cherish8" (Vessel Remix)
2017	HEALTH - "Dark Enough" (Vessel RMX)
2019	Just Mustard - "Seven" (Vessel Remix)
2020	Foals - "Exits" (Vessel Remix)
2021	Lyra Pramuk - "Fountain (Ars Amatoria)" (Vessel Rework)
2022	Fever Ray - "Carbon Dioxide" (single) (co-production with Karin Dreijer)

=== Soundtracks ===
2022	The Northman (co-composition with Robin Carolan)

=== Compositions for live performances ===
2019	Paradise Lost - Composition for String Ensemble and Voice (for Manchester Collective)
2019	Written In Fire - Composition for Electronics and String Ensemble
2021	Squint - Composition for Electronics, String Ensemble and Percussion (for Manchester Collective)
2022	Logos - Co-composition with and for Rakhi Singh & NYX Electronic Drone Choir (for PRS New Music Biennial)
