= Ben Aqua =

- Also known as: ASSACRE; MVSCLZ
- Born: Brooklyn, New York, United States
- Genres: Electronic; Club music
- Occupations: Musician, DJ, photographer, multimedia artist
- Labels: #FEELINGS; DFA; PC Music
- Website: BenAqua.org

Ben Aqua is an American multimedia artist, musician, and photographer based in Austin, Texas.

== Early life ==
Aqua was born in Brooklyn, New York. They studied graphic design at the University of Texas at Austin, where they developed their first solo music and performance art projects, ASSACRE and MVSCLZ, while organizing several DIY/avant-garde art and music events throughout Austin with the collective Totally Wreck Production Institute. Shortly after completing their degree, they began documenting their eccentric peers in photographic portraits involving "totally nonsensical, zany situations in beautifully/bizarrely decorated spaces".

== Career ==
In 2011, Aqua founded the experimental electronic music and art label #FEELINGS. The label produced early music releases by artists Lotic and Rabit, who later released official remixes for Björk in 2015.

Aqua released their debut EP Reset Yourself in 2013, which Interview Magazine described as "high energy and refreshingly difficult to define". They followed the EP with official remixes for YACHT and STRFKR, leading up to the 2014 release of their full-length album Virtual Anticipation, which VICE Thump described as having a "post-human outlook". Their 2014 4C1D EP drew comparisons to Justin Timberlake and The Prodigy.

In 2013, Aqua created a graphic work depicting the words "NEVER LOG OFF" in a large, bold, and underlined font. The graphic spread widely across Tumblr, which led to their creation of a T-shirt featuring the design, distributed via #FEELINGS. The NEVER LOG OFF shirt garnered public interest and support from people all over the world, including celebrities such as Michael Stipe of R.E.M., Porter Robinson, and Casey Spooner of Fischerspooner. In 2015, Aqua accused clothing and accessories retailer Hot Topic of stealing their NEVER LOG OFF shirt concept.

In 2014, Aqua was invited by Resident Advisor to create a podcast to accompany an article written by Adam Harper entitled The online underground: A new kind of punk? The podcast (RA.434) was met with much criticism from conservative RA readers, mostly based on Aqua's open support of controversial label PC Music and artists such as A. G. Cook and Sophie. RA described Aqua as embodying "the online underground's attitude and approach". The podcast was chosen by FACT Magazine as their "Mix of the Week", calling it "a creative, enjoyable blend of...boundary-free dance oddness".

In 2015, Aqua collaborated with Ary Warnaar from Anamanaguchi on a song called Anarchy, which launched as an interactive website that Skrillex's label Nest HQ called "the cutest dismissal of authority you'll ever experience".

== Discography ==
=== Albums ===
- 2014 - Virtual Anticipation - #FEELINGS
- 2018 - Chopin Preludes for Classical Synthesizer - Self-released

=== EPs & Singles ===
- 2009 - Feel Like Yourself Again (under the moniker MVSCLZ) - Self-released
- 2013 - Reset Yourself EP - #FEELINGS
- 2014 - 4C1D EP - #FEELINGS
- 2015 - Anarchy - Collaboration with Ary Warnaar (Anamanaguchi) - NHX
- 2015 - Don't Play Dumb - #FEELINGS
- 2015 - Ultimate Reality (YACHT Remix) - #FEELINGS
- 2016 - Ultimate Reality EP - #FEELINGS
- 2016 - By This River - #FEELINGS
- 2017 - (Don't) Stop Haunting Me - Self-released

=== Remixes ===
- 2011 - Lotic - Rendez-vous (Ben Aqua Remix) - #FEELINGS
- 2012 - Outlaw Producer - Ninjas (Ben Aqua Remix) - Kursed Recordings
- 2012 - YACHT - Second Summer (Ben Aqua Remix) - DFA Records
- 2013 - YACHT - Second Summer (Ben Aqua 3D Winter Remix) - DFA Records
- 2013 - Feathers - Dark Matter (Ben Aqua Remix)
- 2013 - STRFKR - Leave It All Behind (Ben Aqua Remix) - Polyvinyl Record Co.
- 2013 - Chants - Don't Miss U (Ben Aqua Remix) - Hush Hush
- 2014 - Balmorhea - Heir II (Ben Aqua Remix) - Western Vinyl
- 2015 - Big Dipper - Vibin' (Ben Aqua Remix)
- 2015 - Gillepsy - I'm Web (Ben Aqua Remix) - Hyperboloid Records
- 2016 - TT The Artist - Lavish (Ben Aqua Remix) - Space Is The Place
- 2016 - Joe Howe - MIDI Pile (Ben Aqua Remix) - #FEELINGS
- 2017 - Anamanaguchi - Miku ft. Hatsune Miku (Ben Aqua Remix) - NHX
- 2018 - Fischerspooner - TopBrazil (Ben Aqua Remix) - Ultra Music

=== Production credits ===
- 2013 - Zebra Katz - Red River

=== Compilation appearances ===
- 2010 - Don't Play Dumb from V/A The Butt Bias Mixtape - BUTT Magazine, Honey Soundsystem Records
- 2011 - Exterminate from V/A This Is So Random - Egyptian Maraccas
- 2013 - 4C1D (BA Xmas 2.0 Remix) from V/A Christmas 2.0 - PC Music, Priz Tats
- 2013 - Wanna Get Next 2 U from V/A FreshMoon Presents: 808K V.1 - Freshmoon
- 2013 - Glass Of Shattered Glass from V/A ∜♡MDISCS 2K13 - AMDISCS
- 2013 - Y U Mad from V/A Track Meet Compilation 02 - Track Meet
- 2016 - Reset Yourself, Don't Play Dumb, Ultimate Reality (YACHT Remix) from #FEELINGS Vol. 1 - #FEELINGS
