= Lotic (musician) =

American electronic musician

- Born: J’Kerian Morgan; March 22, 1989 (age 37); Houston, Texas, U.S.
- Genres: Deconstructed club; electronic; avant-pop; R&B
- Occupations: DJ; record producer
- Labels: #FEELINGS; Janus Records; Tri Angle; Sci-Fi & Fantasy; Fade to Mind; Houndstooth Records

J’Kerian Morgan (born March 22, 1989), known professionally as Lotic, is an American electronic musician based in Berlin. Lotic rose to prominence through her involvement with the Janus Collective in the early 2010s as well as with a string of EPs released during this time. She was invited by Björk to produce two official Vulnicura remixes in 2016. Her full-length debut, Power, was released in 2018.

== Early life ==
Morgan was born and raised in southwest Houston, in what Mix magazine describes as a "strong black community". She began learning the alto saxophone at the age of 12 and played the instrument in marching band as a high school student. She earned her bachelor's degree at the University of Texas at Austin. Hoping to compose music for film, she started her studies as a film production major and switched to a film major after two years. During her time at UT Austin, she was involved in the university's Experimental and Electronic Music Studios as well as the Intellectual Entrepreneurship program, where she served as an Electronic Music Composition pre-grad intern.

== Career ==
=== 2009–2014: Early DJ career in Austin and Berlin ===
Morgan first became interested in DJing in 2009 after seeing a Kingdom set while still a student at UT Austin. Her involvement with the KVRX student radio station marked the beginning of her own electronic music career as she frequently performed live DJ sets at station showcases and events around Austin. She released music during this time under Ben Aqua's #FEELINGS label.

After graduating college in 2012, Morgan moved to Berlin with her boyfriend to pursue a career in music while working for Ableton. Later that year, she became affiliated with the Janus Collective, a group described in The New York Times as part of an enclave of American expatriates “taking over sleepy venues, creating their own parties and leaving a significant imprint on the city’s musical program.” Morgan became affiliated with Janus after meeting founders Dan D’Norch and Michael Ladner. The next year, she released the mixtape Fallout, which she followed with the Damsel in Distress mixtape in 2014.

=== 2015–2017: Heterocetera, Agitations, collaborations ===
Morgan released two EPs in 2015: Heterocetera and Agitations. In 2016, she was commissioned by Björk to produce two official remixes of "Notget" from Vulnicura; she also served as an opening act on the Berlin date of the Vulnicura tour. That fall, she scored a promotional video for fashion brand ifeoma’s spring/summer 2017 collection. She also soundtracked the autumn/winter 2017 Julius Society show at Paris Fashion Week.

=== 2018–2019: Power ===
Her full-length debut, Power, was released in 2018. Accompanying this release was "Endless Power", an audio-visual production created in collaboration with lighting designer Emmanuel Biard. "Endless Power" was performed at Berlin's CTM Festival and Sónar in Barcelona. That year, she also performed in and scored "Embryogenesis" and "Fleshless Beast", dance pieces choreographed by Roderick George.

Along with Floating Points and Raven, Morgan scored the 2019 KDV Dance Ensemble performance piece "Las Casas Invisibles" choreographed by Kianí del Valle. She also contributed to a remix compilation of tracks from Polish cellist Resina's 2018 album Traces.

=== 2020–present: Water ===
In May 2020, Morgan announced a deal with Houndstooth Records after Tri Angle records shut down the previous month. Her release of the single "Burn a Print" coincided with the signing announcement. The following single, "Cocky", was released that August.

Lotic released the single “Come Unto Me” on August 17, 2021. That same day, she announced that her second studio album, Water, was to be released on October 29 of that year. The second single from Water, "Emergency", was released on September 21, 2021. Both singles were accompanied by music videos directed by Matt Lambert and Lil Internet, respectively.

Sparkling Water, an EP of four remixed tracks from Water accompanied by original brass arrangements, was announced in June 2022 with a release date set for the following month. "Always You (Sparkling)" was released as a single alongside this announcement.

== Musical style ==
Morgan's work as Lotic often addresses social and political issues. Although she now lives in Berlin, her work draws from the African American experience; her sound pays homage to ball culture and drumlines and the album Power was inspired in part by Between the World and Me by Ta-Nehisi Coates. She also explores gender in her music, naming an EP Heterocetera after encountering the term in the work of Audre Lorde. Pitchfork locates Lotic within the broader trend of "conceptronica" that arose in the 2010s, comparing her to artists like Elysia Crampton and Chino Amobi.

Stylistically, critics note the tension between softness and aggression in Lotic's music. Morgan herself considers her sound to have a more sensual edge than her "techno-centric" Berlin contemporaries. 2018's Power marked a stylistic shift for Lotic. Not only was it the first release incorporating Morgan's vocals, but critics noted a "gentler" musical approach compared to her previous, club-oriented releases.

Morgan cites Venus X of GHE20G0TH1K fame and Kingdom as influences.

== Personal life ==
Morgan is transgender, first announcing her transition in 2018. She has criticized the exclusive, "male-centric" nature of Berlin's queer scene and is vocal about racism and homophobia in the broader world of electronic music.

In 2017, Morgan was evicted from her apartment after the individual she subleased from did not pay the full rent. She worked on Power sporadically over the subsequent two-year period while experiencing homelessness.

== Discography ==
=== Studio albums ===
List of studio albums plays, showing year released and selected details
Title	Year	Album details
Power	2018	Released: July 13, 2018; Label: Tri Angle; Formats: Digital download, LP
Water	2021	Released: October 29, 2021; Label: Houndstooth Records; Formats: Digital download, LP

=== Extended plays ===
List of extended plays, showing year released and selected details
Title	Year	Album details
More Than Friends	2011	Label: #FEELINGS; Format: Digital download
Fallout	2013	Label: Sci-Fi& Fantasy; Format: Digital download
Damsel in Distress	2014	Label: Janus Berlin; Format: Digital download
Heterocetera	2015	Label: Tri Angle; Format: Digital download, 12"
Agitations	2015	Label: Tri Angle; Format: Digital download
Sparkling Water	2022	Label: Houndstooth; Format: Digital download

=== Singles ===
List of singles as lead artist, showing year released, album and selected details
Title	Year	Album	Details
"Fallout"	2013	—N/a	Label: Sci-Fi & Fantasy; Format: Digital download
"Sankofa/Glittering"	2013	—N/a	Label: Sci-Fi & Fantasy; Format: Digital download
"Burn a Print"	2020	—N/a	Label: Houndstooth Records; Format: Digital download
"Cocky"	2020	—N/a	Label: Houndstooth Records; Format: Digital download
"Come Unto Me"	2021	Water	Released: August 17, 2021; Label: Houndstooth Records; Format: Digital download
"Emergency"	2021	Water	Released: September 21, 2021; Label: Houndstooth Records; Format: Digital download
"Always You (Sparkling)"	2022	Sparkling Water (EP)	Released: June 9, 2022; Label: Houndstooth Records; Format: Digital download

=== Remixes ===
List of remixes, with year released and artist shown
Title	Year	Artist(s)
"Butch Queen"	2012	Ynfynyt Scroll
"Night After"	2012	Chants
"Scythians"	2014	M.E.S.H.
"Jaws of Life"	2015	Dan Bodan
"Notget (Lotic Keptsafe version)"	2015	Björk
"Notget (Lotic Fromdeath version)"	2015	Björk
"Don't Get All Upset"	2016	Prix
"Threshold of Faith"	2017	Ben Frost
"In In"	2019	Resina
"Honesty"	2021	Son Lux
"Bad Blood"	2022	Soundwalk Collective with Patti Smith
