= Robin Carolan =

English musician and composer (born 1985 or 1986)

- Born: 1985 or 1986 (age 40–41); London, England
- Occupations: Musician; composer
- Years active: 2010–present
- Website: robincarolan.com

Robin Carolan (born 1985 or 1986) is a English musician and composer. He is best known for founding the record label Tri Angle, as well as composing the soundtracks of Robert Eggers's films The Northman (2022), Nosferatu (2024), and Werwulf (2026).

== Biography ==
Carolan was born in London. He was a hip-hop fan in his teenage years, citing Missy Elliott and Lil' Kim as his "obsession[s]". He was a contributor to the blog 20 Jazz Funk Greats in the late 2000s. He also contributed to Slant Magazine as a music reviewer. In 2010, he founded the record label Tri Angle, despite having no prior experience working at a label. After ten years, the label shut down in 2020.

Carolan co-composed the soundtrack of Robert Eggers's film The Northman (2022) with Sebastian Gainsborough, marking his debut film score; he described the project as "baptism by fire". He later collaborated with Eggers again on Nosferatu (2024) and Werwulf (2026), the former of which earned him a BAFTA nomination for Best Original Music.

=== Personal life ===
Although born in England, Carolan is based in Brooklyn.

== Discography ==
| Year | Title | Director | Ref. |
|---|---|---|---|
| 2022 | The Northman | Robert Eggers | |
| 2024 | Nosferatu | Robert Eggers | |
| 2026 | Werwulf | Robert Eggers | |

== Awards and nominations ==
| Award | Year | Category | Nominated work | Result | Ref. |
|---|---|---|---|---|---|
| Austin Film Critics Association Awards | 2025 | Best Original Score | Nosferatu | Nominated | |
| British Academy Film Awards | 2025 | Best Original Music | Nosferatu | Nominated | |
| Chicago Film Critics Association Awards | 2024 | Best Original Score | Nosferatu | Nominated | |
| Fangoria Chainsaw Awards | 2025 | Best Score | Nosferatu | Nominated | |
| Hollywood Music in Media Awards | 2024 | Best Original Score in a Horror Film | Nosferatu | Won | |
| International Film Music Critics Association Awards | 2022 | Breakthrough Composer of the Year | The Northman | Nominated | |
| Ivor Novello Awards | 2026 | Best Original Film Score | Nosferatu | Nominated | |
| Society of Composers & Lyricists Awards | 2025 | David Raksin Award for Emerging Talent | Nosferatu | Nominated | |
| Washington D.C. Area Film Critics Association Awards | 2024 | Best Score | Nosferatu | Nominated | |
| World Soundtrack Awards | 2025 | Discovery of the Year | Nosferatu | Nominated | |
