= The Northman =

2022 film by Robert Eggers

- Theatrical release poster
- Directed by: Robert Eggers
- Written by: Sjón; Robert Eggers
- Based on: The legend of Amleth by Saxo Grammaticus
- Produced by: Mark Huffam; Lars Knudsen; Robert Eggers; Alexander Skarsgård; Arnon Milchan
- Starring: Alexander Skarsgård; Nicole Kidman; Claes Bang; Anya Taylor-Joy; Gustav Lindh; Ethan Hawke; Björk; Willem Dafoe
- Cinematography: Jarin Blaschke
- Edited by: Louise Ford
- Music by: Robin Carolan; Sebastian Gainsborough
- Production companies: Focus Features; Regency Enterprises; New Regency; Square Peg; Perfect World Pictures
- Distributed by: Focus Features (United States); Universal Pictures (International)
- Release dates: April 18, 2022 (TCL Chinese Theatre); April 22, 2022 (United States)
- Running time: 137 minutes
- Country: United States
- Languages: English; Old Norse; Old East Slavic
- Budget: $70 million
- Box office: $75.8 million

The Northman is a 2022 American epic period dark fantasy action film directed by Robert Eggers, who co-wrote the screenplay with Sjón. Based on the legend of Amleth from Gesta Danorum by Saxo Grammaticus, the film follows Amleth, an exiled Viking prince who sets out on a quest to avenge the murder of his father at the hands of his uncle at the height of the Viking Age. It features an ensemble cast of Alexander Skarsgård, Nicole Kidman, Claes Bang, Anya Taylor-Joy, Gustav Lindh, Ethan Hawke, Björk, and Willem Dafoe.

Eggers and Skarsgård, who both also produced, had met to discuss possible collaborations; Eggers decided to make the film his third project after meeting with Skarsgård, who had wanted to make a Viking film for several years. Much of the cast joined in October 2019 and filming took place in locations throughout Iceland, the Republic of Ireland, and Northern Ireland from August to December 2020. The film is heavily influenced by Norse mythology.

The Northman premiered at TCL Chinese Theatre in Los Angeles on April 18, 2022, though it had already been released theatrically in some European and South American countries beginning on April 13. It was released in the United States on April 22. It received positive reviews from critics but underperformed at the box office, grossing either $75.8 or $69.6 million on a net budget of $70 million. It later found an unexpected amount of financial success on VOD and home media, allowing it to recoup a large portion of its box office losses.

== Plot ==
In AD 895, in the North Atlantic, King Aurvandill "War-Raven" returns to the island of Hrafnsey, reuniting with his wife, Queen Gudrún, and his heir, Prince Amleth. To prepare Amleth for his eventual accession to the throne, the father and son participate in a ceremony overseen by Aurvandill's jester, Heimir. Heimir tells Amleth that his destiny is fixed and cannot be escaped, and Amleth vows to avenge his father if Aurvandill is ever slain, rather than live his life in shame. The next morning, Amleth's bastard uncle Fjölnir stages a palace coup, beheads Aurvandill, sacks the hillfort, and carries away Gudrún. Amleth narrowly escapes Fjölnir's assassins and flees by boat, swearing to kill Fjölnir and rescue his mother.

Several years later, an adult Amleth is a berserker within a band of Vikings. After sacking a village in Garðaríki, he encounters a Seeress in the temple of Svetovit. The Seeress orders Amleth to remember his oath of vengeance and tells him that his fate is intertwined with that of a Maiden-King. Soon after, he learns that "Fjölnir the Brotherless" has lost his throne to Harald of Norway and now lives as a sheep farmer in Iceland. Branding himself as a thrall, Amleth sneaks aboard a ship bound for Iceland. He encounters an enslaved Slavic woman named Olga, who claims to be a sorceress. They are taken to Fjölnir's farm, where Amleth learns his mother married Fjölnir and bore him a son named Gunnar. When most of the slaves are rejected as defective, Amleth displays his strength and aggression to impress Fjölnir, who ultimately decides to keep him and Olga due to her beauty.

One night, Amleth follows a vixen and encounters a warlock, who facilitates a seance between Amleth and the skull of Heimir, whom Fjölnir has also murdered. Heimir tells Amleth about Draugr, a magical sword that can be drawn only at night or at the Gates of Hel. Amleth enters a barrow and obtains the blade from its owner, the undead Mound Dweller. He hides the sword upon his return to the farm. The next day, Amleth is selected to compete in a game of knattleikr against another farm. The game turns violent when the leader of the opposing team brutalizes the competition until only he and Amleth are left. Gunnar (looking up to Amleth, not knowing he is his half-brother), is almost killed in trying to draw away the opposing player; but Amleth saves him, furiously beating his opponent to death. As a reward, Fjölnir's adult son, Thórir, grants him overseer duties and allows him to choose a woman.

During the evening celebrations, Amleth and Olga make love; they promise to overcome Fjölnir together. Over several nights Amleth kills prominent members of Fjölnir's estate in unnatural ways, arranging their impaled body parts into the shape of a horse in a gruesome display. This makes Fjölnir and the entire estate believe they are under attack from an evil spirit. Christian slaves are believed by Thórir to be responsible. Olga mixes the food supply with fly agaric, a potent hallucinogen. This allows Amleth to enter Fjölnir's house. Amleth reveals his identity to Gudrún, who replies that she was Aurvandill's slave and that Amleth was conceived by rape. Gudrún also reveals that she masterminded Fjölnir's coup because she wanted both Aurvandill and Amleth dead. She tries to seduce Amleth, who, after a moment, rejects her. Enraged and disgusted, Amleth kills Thórir, and cuts out his heart.

Gudrún reveals Amleth's true identity to Fjölnir and calls for Amleth's death. Fjölnir prepares to kill Olga, but Amleth offers to trade Olga's life for Thórir's heart. Amleth allows himself to be captured, and is tortured for the location of Thórir's heart. Amleth is released from his restraints by a flock of ravens sent by Odin and Olga rescues him. The two escape by boat to his kinsmen in the Orkney Islands after Amleth decides to abandon his quest for revenge. Aboard the vessel Amleth has a vision, and realizes that Olga is pregnant with twins, one of whom will be the Maiden-King prophesied by the Seeress. Realizing that Olga and their children will never be safe while Fjölnir lives, Amleth, despite Olga's pleas, jumps overboard and swims ashore, reasoning that he cannot escape his fate.

Back at the farm, Amleth kills Fjölnir's remaining men and frees the slaves. While searching for Fjölnir, Amleth is attacked by Gudrún and Gunnar and kills them in self-defense after being wounded. Fjölnir, discovering his wife and son dead, coldly tells Amleth to meet him at the Gates of Hel: the crater of the volcano Hekla. Amleth and Fjölnir engage in a fierce Holmgang (duel) until Fjölnir is beheaded and Amleth is simultaneously stabbed. As he dies, Amleth has a vision of Olga embracing their two children, assuring him they are safe before urging him to let go. A valkyrie carries Amleth through the gates of Valhalla.

== Cast ==
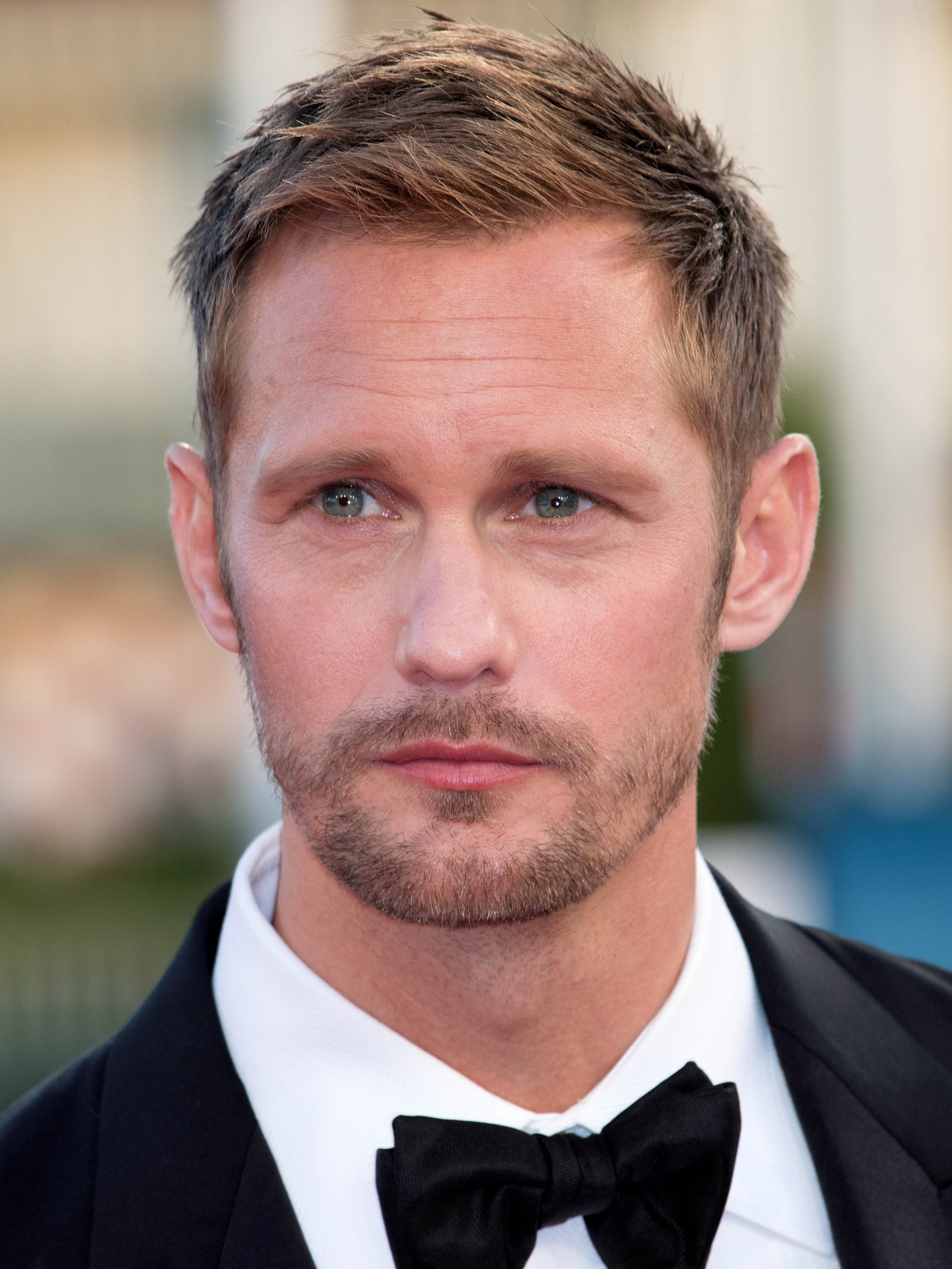
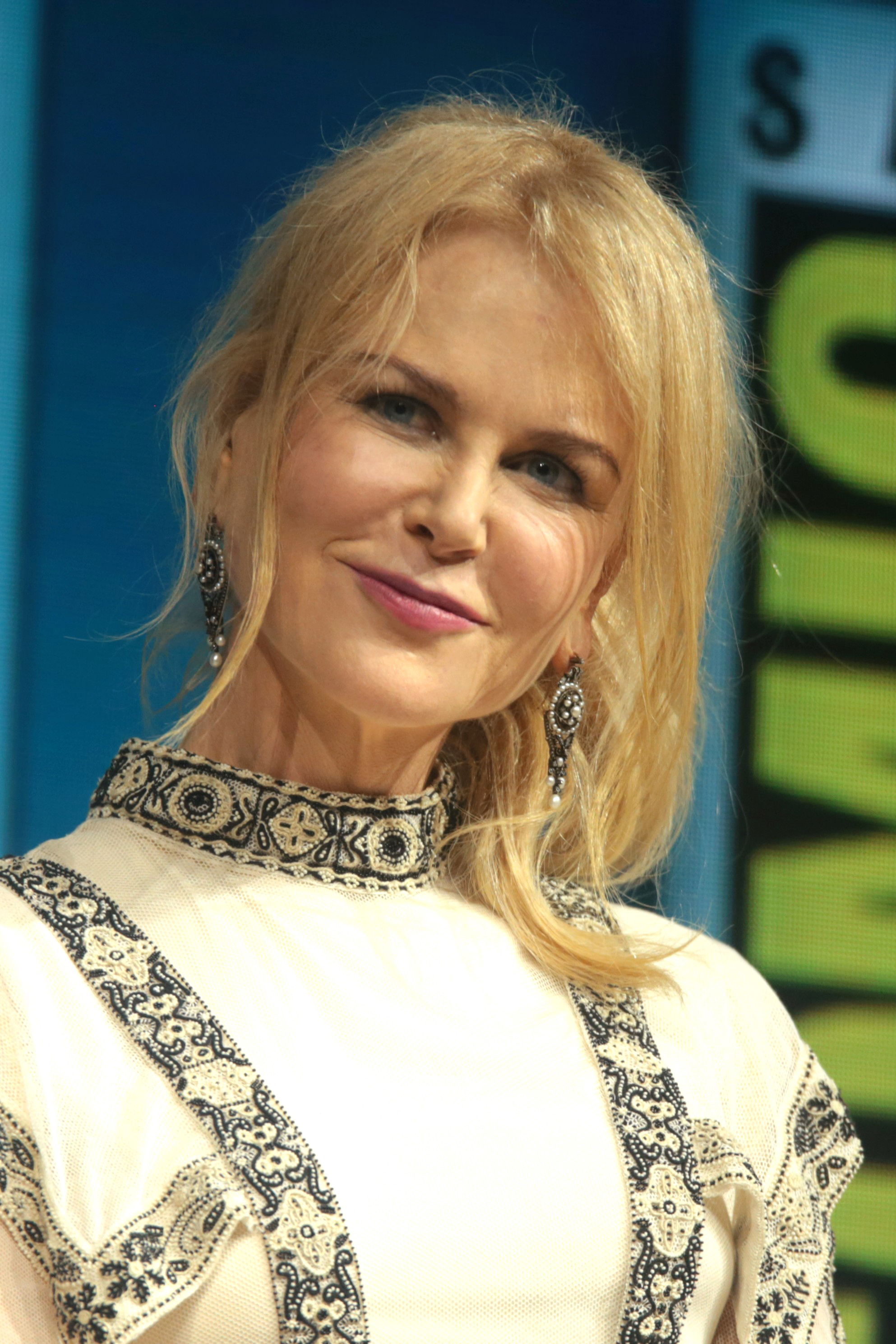
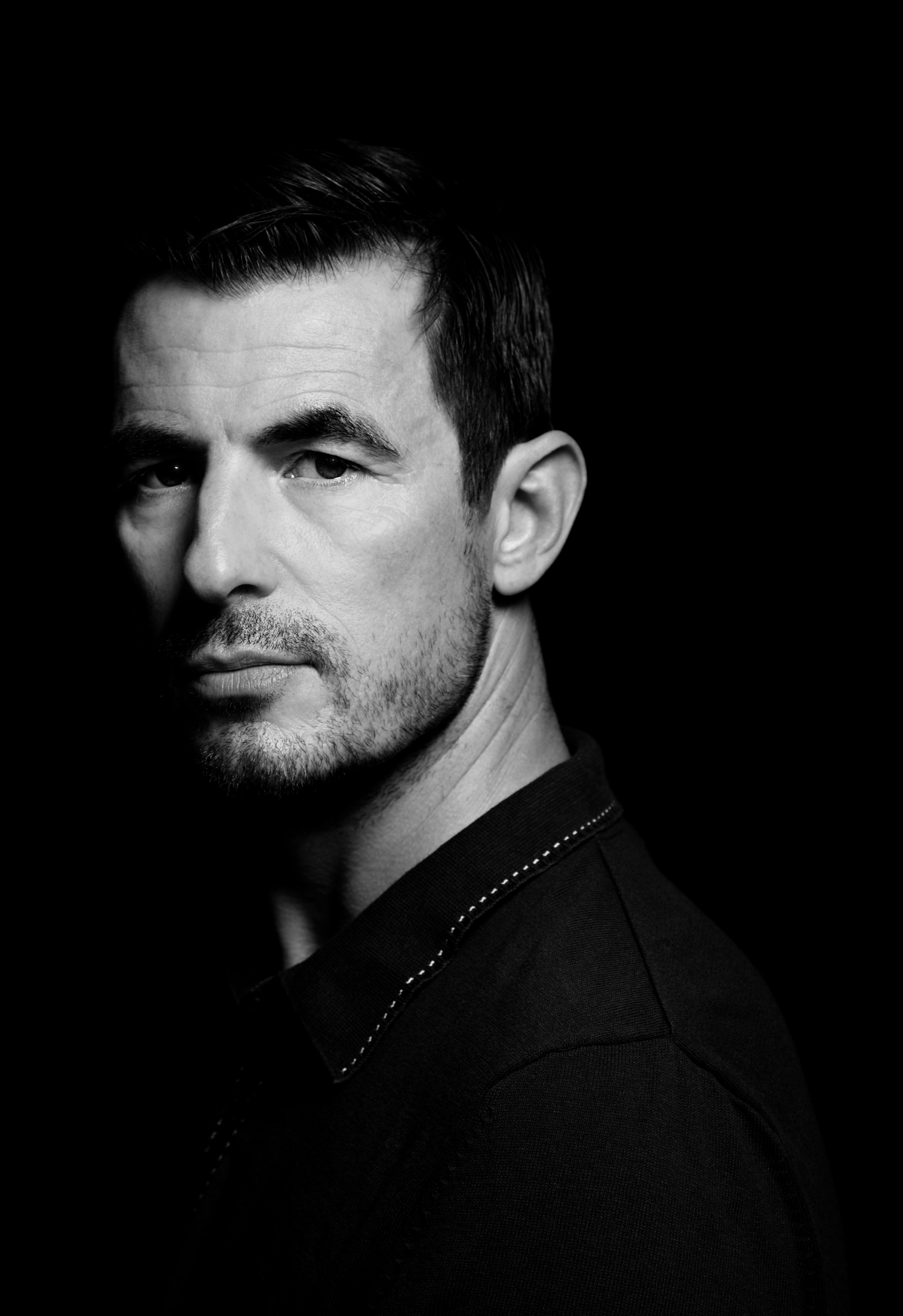
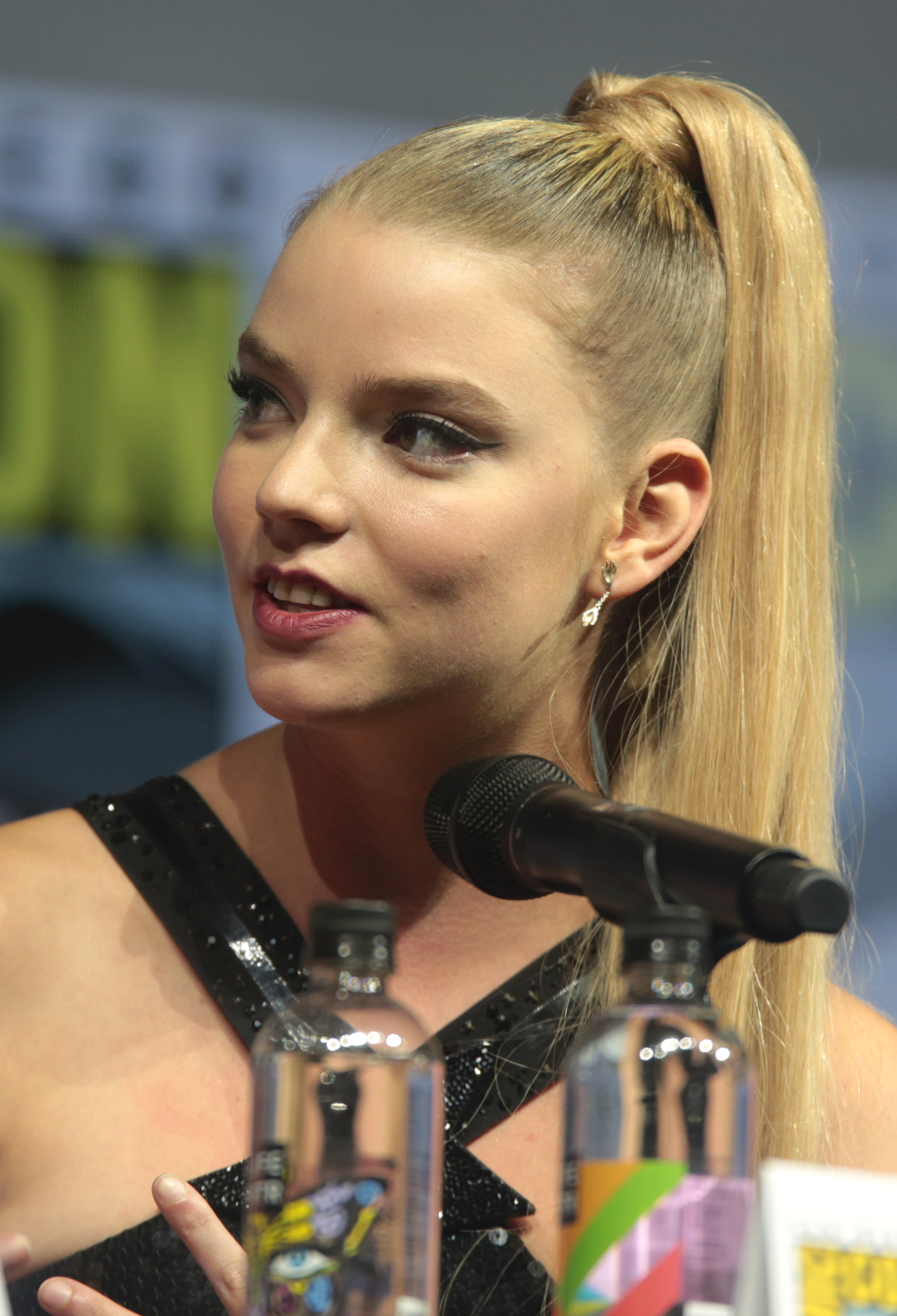
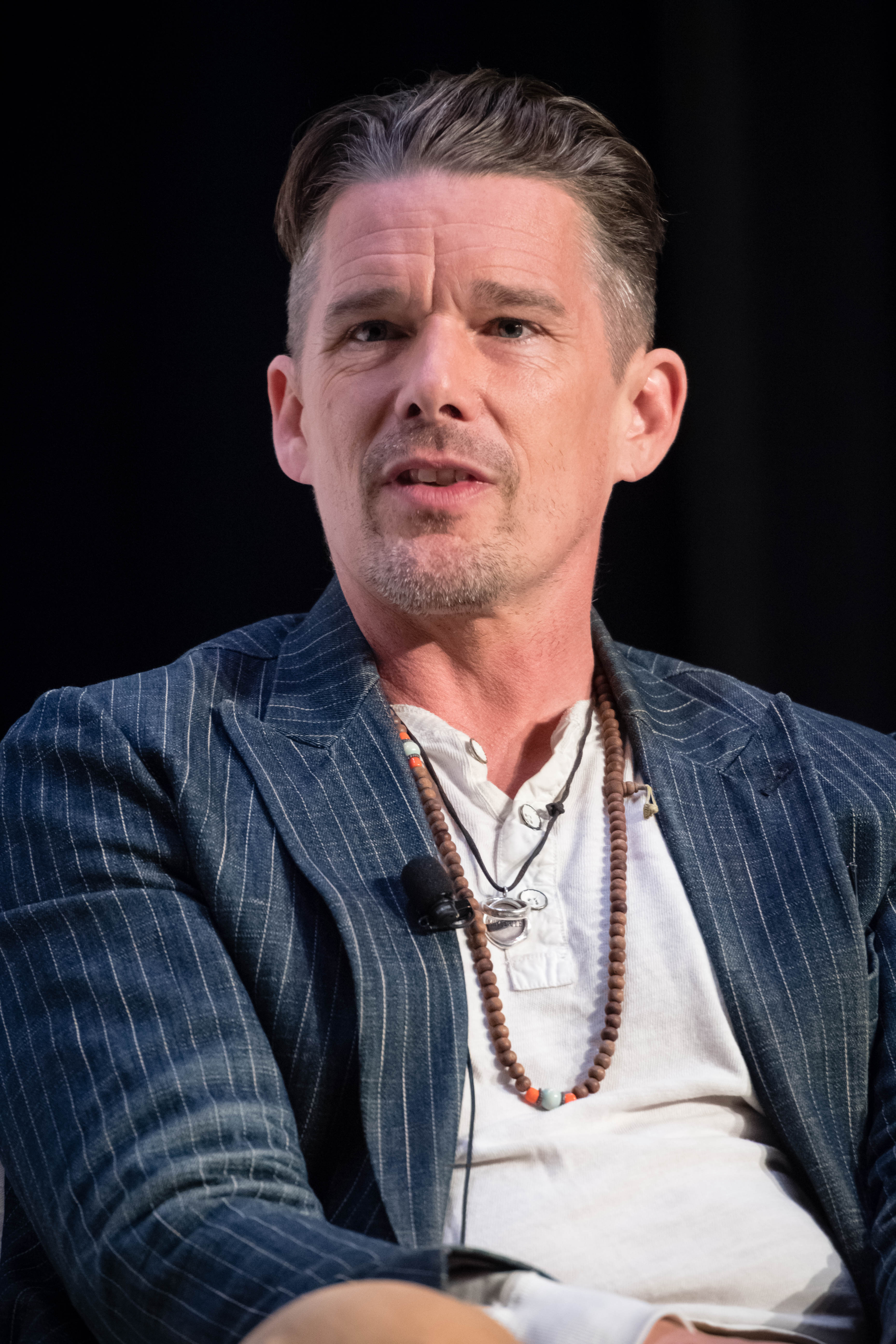
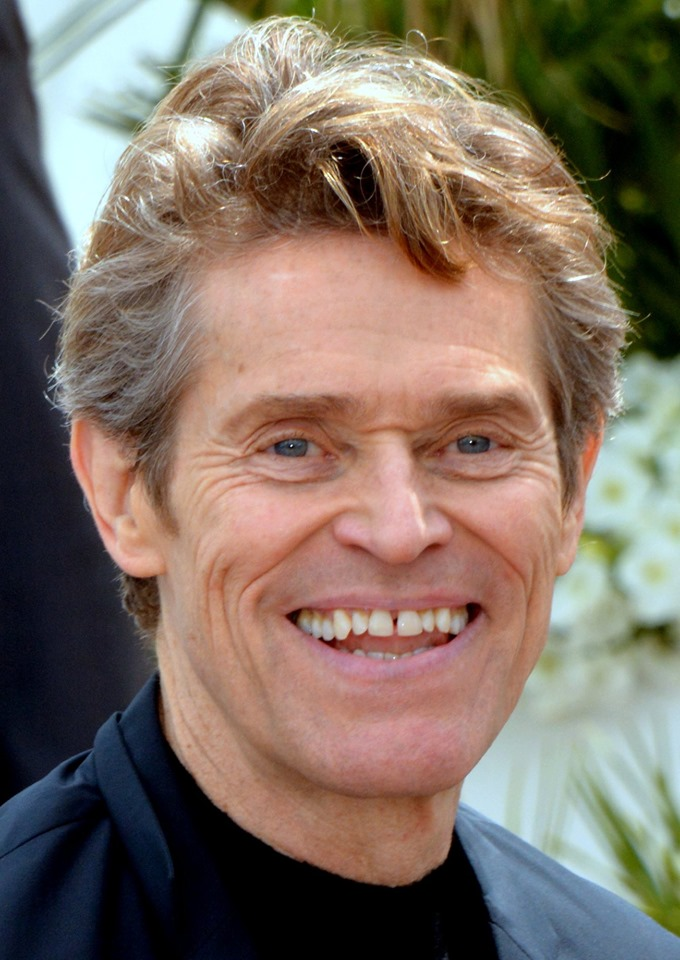
(Clockwise from the top left) The Northman stars Alexander Skarsgård, Nicole Kidman, Claes Bang, Willem Dafoe, Ethan Hawke and Anya Taylor-Joy
- Alexander Skarsgård as Amleth, a Viking warrior prince
  - Oscar Novak as young Amleth
- Nicole Kidman as Queen Gudrún, Amleth's mother
- Claes Bang as Fjölnir the Brotherless, Amleth's uncle and Aurvandill's brother
- Anya Taylor-Joy as Olga of the Birch Forest, a Slavic sorceress
- Ethan Hawke as King Aurvandill War-Raven, Amleth's father and Fjölnir's brother
- Gustav Lindh as Thórir the Proud, Fjölnir's elder son and Amleth's cousin
- Elliott Rose as Gunnar, Fjölnir's younger son and Amleth's half-brother
- Willem Dafoe as Heimir the Fool
- Björk as the Seeress
- Eldar Skar as Finnr the Nose-Stub, Fjölnir's foreman
- Phill Martin as Hallgrímr Half-Troll
- Olwen Fouéré as Ashildur Hofgythja, the priestess of Fjölnir's estate
- Ingvar Eggert Sigurðsson as the He-witch
- Ian Whyte as the Mound Dweller
- Hafþór Júlíus Björnsson as Thorfinnr Tooth-Gnasher, Hákon's champion
- Kate Dickie as Halldóra the Pict, a slave on Fjölnir's farm
- Tadhg Murphy as Eirikr Blaze-Eye, Amleth's fellow berserker
- Ralph Ineson as Captain Volodymyr, a Rus' sea captain
- Murray McArthur as Hákon Ironbeard, chieftain of the neighboring farm
- Ineta Šliužaitė as the Valkyrja

== Production ==
=== Development ===
Born to a Swedish family, Alexander Skarsgård had been fascinated with Viking history and mythology since childhood, and had long sought a Viking-themed project with the help of producer Lars Knudsen. In 2011, Skarsgård was attached to a Warner Bros. epic with the working title The Vanguard, which ultimately did not materialize. Robert Eggers became interested in making a Viking film following a 2016 trip to Iceland with his wife Alexandra Shaker, who is a fan of Old Norse sagas. During the trip, Eggers met Björk, who in turn introduced him to Sjón. In 2017, Skarsgård met Eggers to discuss future projects, and the discussion turned to a Viking Age–themed film. Eggers subsequently reached out to Sjón, and the two began researching and writing the screenplay.

The story of The Northman was based primarily on the legend of Amleth as written by Danish historian Saxo Grammaticus, known as the direct inspiration for William Shakespeare's Hamlet. Eggers cited the Poetic Edda, the Prose Edda, Egil's Saga, Grettir's Saga, the Eyrbyggja saga and the Saga of Hrolfr Kraki as additional influences. Archaeologist Neil Price at Uppsala University, folklorist Terry Gunnell at the University of Iceland and Viking historian Jóhanna Katrín Friðriksdóttir served as historical consultants on the film. Eggers also acknowledged 1982's Conan the Barbarian as a source of inspiration.

In October 2019, it was announced that Eggers would direct an epic Viking revenge saga, which he would also co-write with Sjón. Skarsgård, Nicole Kidman, Anya Taylor-Joy, Bill Skarsgård (Alexander's brother) and Willem Dafoe were in talks to join the film. They would all be confirmed in December, along with the addition of Claes Bang to the cast. The film was officially in preparation in December 2019, and would begin filming in Belfast in 2020. In August 2020, Björk, along with her daughter Ísadóra "Doa" Barney, Kate Dickie and Ethan Hawke joined the cast of the film. In September 2020, Bill Skarsgård announced he had dropped out of the film due to scheduling conflicts and was replaced with Gustav Lindh.

=== Filming ===
Principal photography was to begin in March 2020, but it was halted due to the COVID-19 pandemic. Filming, most of which took place in Northern Ireland, started in August 2020 and wrapped early in December, lasting 87 days. King Aurvandill's village was constructed at Torr Head on the coast of County Antrim, while Fjölnir's farm was built at Knockdhu near Larne. The scenes in the Land of the Rus were filmed at Portglenone, the Clandeboye Estate, Shane's Castle and on the River Bann. The Hightown quarry outside Belfast stood for the volcano Hekla, where the film's climactic fight takes place. Brief sequences were filmed at Five Fingers Strand near Malin in Inishowen County Donegal, and in Iceland at the Svínafellsjökull glacier and the town of Akureyri.

=== Post-production ===
The film, originally planned to cost around $65 million, ended up costing between $70–90 million to produce. Eggers found the editing process to be the most difficult of his career. Feedback from test screenings indicated that the film's first act was too slow. More feedback showed that audiences found the Old Norse dialogue difficult to understand, which resulted in most of it being replaced in ADR sessions. The final cut was eventually approved on November 3, 2021.

=== Music ===
For the film's score, Eggers brought in former Tri Angle record label artists, Robin Carolan and Sebastian Gainsborough (Vessel), for composition and production. They researched extensively on the history of Viking music, including discussions with ethnographer Poul Høxbro, and used instruments based on Nordic folk music, such as tagelharpa, langspil, kravik lyre, and säckpipa. They further experimented with the instruments they had, to create that ethnic Nordic sound, which includes a 40-member string ensemble mimicking the sound of an archaic instrument called bullroarer.

The score album was released by Back Lot Music on April 15, 2022, and featured 43 tracks. On July 1, Sacred Bones Records released the album in CD, vinyl and cassettes.

== Marketing ==
The film's advertising campaign briefly attracted notoriety due to a series of posters commissioned for the New York subway system that did not include the film's title. Within a day of the subject going viral on Twitter, the posters were removed.

=== Tie-in media ===
A 160-page book written by Simon Abrams about the film's production and research, titled The Northman: A Call to the Gods, was published on November 8, 2022.

== Release ==
=== Theatrical ===
The Northman was originally scheduled to be released on April 8, 2022, but was later pushed back to April 22. It was distributed by Focus Features in United States and by Universal Pictures internationally. Special screenings were held in several cities worldwide ahead of the theatrical release: in Stockholm at Rigoletto Cinema on March 28, in Hamburg at Astor Film Lounge on March 30, in Rome at Cinema Troisi on April 1, in London at Odeon Luxe Leicester Square on April 5, and in Belfast at Cineworld on April 6. The world premiere took place in Los Angeles at TCL Chinese Theatre on April 18. Wide releases began early in some countries: on April 13 in Denmark, Norway and Sweden; on April 14 in Czech Republic, Ecuador, Iceland, Mexico, Montenegro, Netherlands, Serbia, Slovakia, Slovenia and Uruguay; and on April 15 in the United Kingdom and Lithuania.

=== Home media ===
The Northman was released on VOD on May 13, 2022, on digital on June 6, 2022, and on Blu-ray, DVD and Ultra HD Blu-ray on June 7, 2022, by Universal Pictures Home Entertainment in the United States.

== Reception ==
=== Box office ===
The Northman grossed $34.2 million in the United States and Canada, and $35.4 million in other territories – for a worldwide total of $69.6 million on a budget of $70–90 million.

In the U.S. and Canada, The Northman was released alongside The Bad Guys and The Unbearable Weight of Massive Talent, and was projected to gross $8–15 million from 3,223 theaters in its opening weekend. It made $5 million on its first day, including $1.4 million from Thursday night previews. The film went on to debut to $12.3 million in its opening weekend, finishing fourth at the box office. Deadline Hollywood noted that The Northman and The Unbearable Weight of Massive Talent were targeting the same demographic, which impeded their debuts. The film earned $6.4 million in its second weekend, finishing fourth; $2.9 million in its third weekend, finishing sixth; $1.75 million in its fourth weekend, finishing seventh; and $1.1 million in its fifth weekend, finishing 10th. It dropped out of the box office top 10 in its sixth weekend with $249,660.

Outside the U.S. and Canada, the film earned $3.4 million from 15 international markets in its opening weekend. It made $6.3 million in its second weekend after expanding to 41 markets, $4.5 million in its third weekend, $2.2 million in its fourth, $2.5 million in its fifth, $2.9 million in its sixth, and $1.4 million in its seventh.

=== Home media performance ===
Eggers commented on the film's underwhelming box office, stating that "[The film] met the expectations of a bad marketplace ... Am I disappointed that, three to four weeks in, we're on VOD because that's the way things are done in the post-COVID world? Yeah. But it's doing great on VOD, so there you go." In its debut weekend on PVOD in the U.S., the film was the top-rented title on iTunes, third on Vudu and fourth on Google Play, making about the same amount of revenue as The Bad Guys and The Lost City, despite grossing much less than both in theaters. IndieWire wrote that "The Northman looks like the type of film that, even with lower theatrical returns, is greatly elevated by that exposure." The following week, it finished third on the iTunes and Vudu charts, and fifth on Google Play.

In its debut week on the DVD/Blu-ray market, the film debuted at the No. 1 spot on both the NPD VideoScan First Alert chart (which tracks combined DVD and Blu-ray disc unit sales) and the Blu-ray disc sales chart for the week ending June 11, 2022.

On September 28, 2023, Deadline Hollywood reported the film "approached breakeven thanks to overindexing on Premium VOD". Focus Features' president of production and acquisitions, Kiska Higgs, also stated that the film was "OK for us in the end", though she noted that costs were shared by New Regency, and Focus Features' wasn't "front and center on production of [the film]".

=== Critical response ===
The review aggregator Rotten Tomatoes reported that 90% of 383 critics gave the film a positive review, with an average rating of 7.7/10. The website's critical consensus reads: "A bloody revenge epic and breathtaking visual marvel, The Northman finds filmmaker Robert Eggers expanding his scope without sacrificing any of his signature style." Metacritic assigned the film a weighted average score of 82 out of 100 based on sixty critics, indicating "universal acclaim". Audiences polled by CinemaScore gave the film an average grade of "B" on an A+ to F scale, while PostTrak gave it a 75% positive score (with an average 3.5 out of five stars), with 56% saying they would definitely recommend it.

MovieZine's Alexander Kardelo gave the film a four out of five score and particularly praised Skarsgård's performance and Eggers' direction. The Guardian's Peter Bradshaw gave a five out of five score, praising the film's nihilistic tone and performances by the cast, stating, "It's entirely outrageous, with some epic visions of the flaring cosmos. I couldn't look away." Digital Spy's Gabriella Geisinger also gave a five out of five score, praising Eggers's visionary direction and the film's grisly and surreal atmosphere and claiming, "The world created in The Northman is so totally absorbing". IndieWire's David Ehrlich called the film "primal, sinewy, gnarly-as-fuck," "grab-you-by-the-throat intense" and "never dull." Total Film's Matt Maytum commented that the film is a "truly distinctive, unmissable epic" in his review, ultimately giving it a five out of five stars. The Independent's Clarrise Loughrey gave it five out of five stars, and stated in her review that the film was a "beautiful risk". RogerEbert.com's Robert Daniels gave it three out of four, and praised the direction, cinematography and cast performances, but found that the film "often stumbles when it searches for profundity."

The Austin Chronicle's Richard Whittaker called the film an "extraordinary feat of cinema," commending the direction. The New York Times's A.O. Scott praised the world-building and cinematography, writing, "Eggers's accomplishment lies in his fastidious, fanatical rendering of that world, down to its bed linens and cooking utensils." The New Yorker's Richard Brody found that the film "offers no synesthesia, no evocation of any sense beside vision" and criticized Eggers's direction, ultimately concluding, "The Northman merely serves up its raw material both half-baked and overcooked." Rolling Stone's K. Austin Collins wrote that "It's an oft-stunning visual feast," but added, "It is also an instructive example of how the most visionary intentions can't always enliven an otherwise rote story." Christopher Howse in The Spectator commends the "great store" Eggers sets "by material authenticity". Howse was less fond of the persistent "slittings, maimings and disembowellings". "Violence in the foreground is like flak concealing what lies behind; perhaps it should have been even longer with less action", is his overall critical assessment.

In December 2024, Collider ranked the film at number 7 on its list of the "10 Best Fantasy Movies of the 2020s," with Robert Lee III writing that it is "a perfect example of how fantasy movies do not always have to be colorful and family-friendly in their execution, being a brutal and striking R-rated fantasy film filled with violence and bloodshed at every corner. Its violence serves a greater purpose than simply being eye-candy, however, as it helps create a sense of realism for this folk tale adventure, treating Amleth's story as a sort of powerful mythos to be passed down across generations of Viking warriors."

=== Accolades ===
| Award ceremony | Date of ceremony | Category | Recipient | Result | Ref. |
|---|---|---|---|---|---|
| Hollywood Critics Association Midseason Film Awards | July 1, 2022 | Best Picture | The Northman | Nominated | |
| Hollywood Critics Association Midseason Film Awards | July 1, 2022 | Best Director | Robert Eggers | Nominated | |
| Hollywood Critics Association Midseason Film Awards | July 1, 2022 | Best Actor | Alexander Skarsgård | Nominated | |
| Hollywood Critics Association Midseason Film Awards | July 1, 2022 | Best Supporting Actress | Anya Taylor-Joy | Nominated | |
| Location Managers Guild Awards | August 27, 2022 | Outstanding Locations in a Period Film | Thor Kjartansson, Naomi Liston, and Gordon Wycherley | Nominated | |
| Saturn Awards | October 25, 2022 | Best Thriller Film | The Northman | Nominated | |
| Chicago Film Critics Association Awards | December 14, 2022 | Best Costume Design | Linda Muir | Nominated | |
| Dublin Film Critics' Circle Awards | December 15, 2022 | Best Director | Robert Eggers | Nominated | |
| Dublin Film Critics' Circle Awards | December 15, 2022 | Best Cinematography | Jarin Blaschke | Nominated | |
| San Diego Film Critics Society Awards | January 6, 2023 | Special Award for Body of Work | Ethan Hawke (Note: Also for The Black Phone, Glass Onion: A Knives Out Mystery and Raymond & Ray) | Runner-up | |
| Seattle Film Critics Society Awards | January 17, 2023 | Best Action Choreography | The Northman | Nominated | |
| Seattle Film Critics Society Awards | January 17, 2023 | Best Costume Design | Linda Muir | Nominated | |
| Seattle Film Critics Society Awards | January 17, 2023 | Best Production Design | Niamh Coulter (set decoration) and Craig Lathrop (production design) | Nominated | |
| International Film Music Critics Association Awards | February 23, 2023 | Best Original Score for an Action/Adventure Film | Robert Carolan and Sebastian Gainsborough | Nominated | |
| Critics' Choice Super Awards | March 16, 2023 | Best Science Fiction/Fantasy Movie | The Northman | Nominated | |
| Critics' Choice Super Awards | March 16, 2023 | Best Actor in a Science Fiction/Fantasy Movie | Alexander Skarsgård | Nominated | |
