= Tri Angle (record label) =

English record label

- Founded: 2010
- Founder: Robin Carolan
- Defunct: April 24, 2020
- Genre: Electronic
- Country of origin: U.S./U.K.
- Location: New York City; London
- Official website: tri-anglerecords.com

Tri-Angle was a British record label based in London and New York established by Robin Carolan in 2010. The label released albums by serpentwithfeet, The Haxan Cloak, Vessel, Forest Swords, Holy Other, and Clams Casino.

== History ==
After its inception and first set of releases, Tri Angle initially gained a reputation with Dazed & Confused magazine, which called the label "one of today’s most singular musical tribes". In 2011, Tri Angle was named one of the top-50 labels in America by Billboard, and in 2013, label owner Robin Carolan was profiled in The New Yorker. The label's releases were featured on multiple "best of" lists by notable websites and publications such as Pitchfork, The Guardian, The New York Times, Rolling Stone, and Spin.

=== Style and impact ===
Tri Angle's sound was heavily debated in the music press, with The Wire noting it as being "one of the hardest labels to pin down in contemporary music". Starting in the middle of the 2010s, artists from the label began collaborating with, and creatively partnering with, mainstream artists including Kanye West, Björk, Disclosure, A$AP Rocky, FKA Twigs, Diplo, Vince Staples, Atticus Ross, Tinashe, Massive Attack, and The Weeknd. Björk in particular was a strong supporter of the label, crediting Robin Carolan with having helped her finish her eighth studio album Vulnicura, as well as collaborating with Tri Angle on a number of other occasions. In 2017, Carolan was credited on Utopia, Björk's ninth studio album, as 'the fifth ear'.

=== Shutdown ===
On April 24, 2020, Carolan released a statement via Twitter announcing that Tri Angle was officially defunct. He went on to compose the score (alongside Sebastian Gainsborough) for Robert Eggers's 2022 film The Northman. Carolan later composed the score for Eggers' remake of Nosferatu and the upcoming Werwulf.

== Former artists ==
- Adult Jazz
- AlunaGeorge
- Balam Acab
- Boothroyd
- Brood Ma
- Clams Casino
- Compton White
- Evian Christ
- Fatima Al Qadiri
- Forest Swords
- Fis
- Future Brown
- Hanz
- The Haxan Cloak
- Holy Other
- How to Dress Well
- Howse
- Katie Gately
- Lie
- LOFT
- Lotic
- mmph
- oOoOO
- Rabit
- Roly Porter
- serpentwithfeet
- Sd Laika
- Vessel
- Water Borders
- Wife
