= Robert Eggers =

American filmmaker (born 1983)

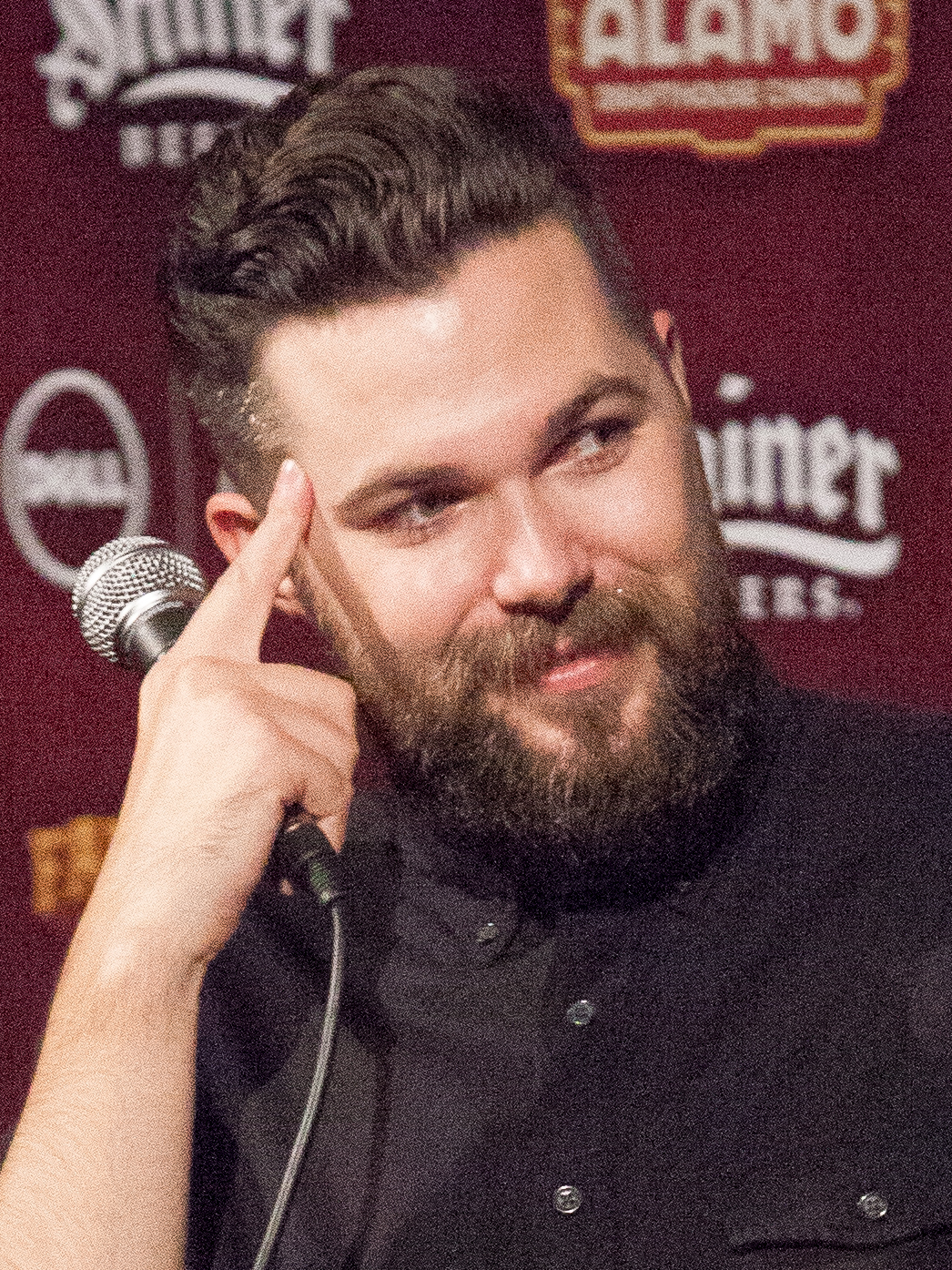
- Eggers in 2015
- Born: July 7, 1983 (age 43); New York City, U.S.
- Occupation: Filmmaker
- Years active: 2007–present
- Spouse: Alexandra Shaker
- Children: 1

Robert Houston Eggers (born July 7, 1983) is an American filmmaker. He is best known for writing and directing the films The Witch (2015), The Lighthouse (2019), The Northman (2022), and Nosferatu (2024). His films are set before the 20th century and noted for their historical authenticity and blending of gothic horror, folklore, and mythology.

== Early life ==
Robert Houston Eggers was born in New York City on July 7, 1983. He does not know his biological father. He and his mother Kelly Houston moved to Laramie, Wyoming, where she met and married Walter Eggers, an English literature professor at the University of Wyoming. The couple had twin sons named Max and Sam, who also became filmmakers. In 1990, the family relocated to Lee, New Hampshire, after Walter became a provost at the University of New Hampshire.

Eggers returned to New York to attend the American Musical and Dramatic Academy in 2001. He gained an interest in designing, directing, and theater while there, and would additionally show an interest in filmmaking by directing and designing short films. His childhood in New England often inspires his work; while writing his first feature film, he frequently visited the Plimoth Patuxet in Massachusetts. He later said that he still has family in Epping, New Hampshire.

== Career ==
Eggers began his career as a designer and director of theatre productions in New York, primarily in experimental and street theatre, before transitioning to working in film. He wrote and directed the horror film The Witch (2015) in his feature film directorial debut, and it premiered at the 2015 Sundance Film Festival before A24 acquired it. It was released theatrically on February 19, 2016. Critical reception was largely positive, and the film earned over $40 million against a budget of $4 million.

Eggers's next film, The Lighthouse (2019), was also a period piece and received critical acclaim. He directed the film from a screenplay he co-wrote with his brother, Max, and it stars Robert Pattinson and Willem Dafoe. In 2022, the Amleth-inspired Viking epic film The Northman was released, starring Alexander Skarsgård, Nicole Kidman, Anya Taylor-Joy, Ethan Hawke, Björk, and Willem Dafoe. Critical reception was largely positive, but the film underperformed at the box office and did not make a profit until it was released on VOD.

In July 2015, it was reported that Eggers would write and direct a remake of the silent film Nosferatu (1922). The film was set to be produced by Jay Van Hoy and Lars Knudsen for Studio 8. In November 2016, Eggers expressed surprise that the Nosferatu remake was going to be his second film, saying, "It feels ugly and blasphemous and egomaniacal and disgusting for a filmmaker in my place to do Nosferatu next. I was really planning on waiting a while, but that's how fate shook out." Eggers had previously directed his high school's performance of the Nosferatu play, and was hired to direct a professional version of the play due to his work. Eggers credited this as the event that inspired him to pursue a career in filmmaking. Eggers eventually opted to delay his version of the film, going on to direct The Lighthouse and The Northman first. The Witch star Anya Taylor-Joy was attached to the cast alongside Harry Styles, but both dropped out in 2022. In September 2022, it was reported that the film would star Bill Skarsgård in the title role alongside Lily-Rose Depp. Nosferatu became his fourth film.

In January 2025, it was reported Eggers would direct Werwulf, a werewolf horror film set in 14th-century England. The film's North American release is currently set for Christmas Day 2026. Aaron Taylor-Johnson was confirmed to star in Werwulf in July 2025, alongside Lily-Rose Depp and Willem Dafoe.

In 2026, Eggers was honoured at the 59th Sitges Film Festival with the Time Machine Award (The Màquina del Temps).

=== Prospective projects ===
Eggers was at one point developing a miniseries based on the life of Grigori Rasputin. However, he stated in 2024 that development has stalled as he would be unable to film in Russia. He has also developed a medieval film called The Knight, which has yet to be produced.

In June 2025, it was reported Eggers was writing and directing a new adaptation of A Christmas Carol for Warner Bros. Pictures, with Willem Dafoe the frontrunner to play Ebenezer Scrooge. It was also reported that he would write and direct a sequel to the 1986 film Labyrinth. Additionally, Eggers started writing an "Elizabethan" script and expressed interest in making a Western. In September 2026, Eggers was announced to be directing and producing an adaptation of Romeo and Juliet with early modern English dialogue. Focus Features won the rights in a bidding war.

== Artistry ==
One of the major traits of films directed by Eggers is his "strict attention to detail". All of his films are period dramas, and have been noted for their historical accuracy, especially their use of specific language and period-appropriate dialogue.

Eggers stated in a Rotten Tomatoes interview that he is not interested in making films set in the contemporary era, claiming that the idea of photographing modern technology disgusts him. When asked what is the latest era he is willing to film, he answered that he will go as far as the 1950s.

== Personal life ==
Eggers is married to clinical psychologist Alexandra Shaker, whom he has known since childhood. They have a son together. They lived in Brooklyn from 2001 to 2023, when they relocated to London.

== Filmography ==
=== Feature films ===
Year	Title	Director	Writer	Producer	Notes	Ref.
2015	The Witch	Yes	Yes	No		
2019	The Lighthouse	Yes	Yes	Yes	Co-written with Max Eggers	
2022	The Northman	Yes	Yes	Yes	Co-written with Sjón	
2024	Nosferatu	Yes	Yes	Yes		
2026	Werwulf	Yes	Yes	Yes	Co-written with Sjón, Post-production	

=== Short films ===
Year	Title	Director	Writer	Notes	Ref.
2007	Hansel and Gretel	Yes	Yes	Also production designer	
2008	The Tell-Tale Heart	Yes	Yes	Also production designer	
2015	Brothers	Yes	Yes		

=== Costume designer ===
Year	Title	Notes	Ref.
2009	Drawing from Life	Short film	
2010	Prelude and Fugue	Short film	
2010	Confessional Stories: Voluntary Damnation	Short film	
2010	Confessional Stories: First Confession	Short film	
2010	Monster	Short film	
2010	YellowBrickRoad	Feature	
2011	The Tailor	Short film	
2011	The Five Stages of Grief	Short film	
2011	Tell Your Friends! The Concert Film!	Documentary	
2011	In the Pines	Short film	
2012	Anemone	Short film	
2012	Legacy	Short film	
2012	Esther	Short film	
2013	The House at the Edge of the Galaxy	Short film	
2013	Vivace!	Short film	
2013	Spirit Cabinet	Feature film	
2014	Rose	Short film	

== Reception ==
Year	Film	Rotten Tomatoes	Metacritic		Budget	Box office
Year	Film	Rotten Tomatoes	Rating	Reviews	Budget	Box office
2015	The Witch	91% (337 reviews)	84	46	$4 million	$40.4 million
2019	The Lighthouse	90% (396 reviews)	83	51	$11 million	$18.3 million
2022	The Northman	90% (382 reviews)	82	60	$70 million	$75 million
2024	Nosferatu	85% (372 reviews)	78	59	$50 million	$181.2 million

== Frequent collaborators ==
Eggers is known for his recurring collaborations with certain actors and crew members.

Frequent actor collaborations (2 or more projects)
Work Collaborator	The Witch (2015)	The Lighthouse (2019)	The Northman (2022)	Nosferatu (2024)	Werwulf (2026)	Total projects
Ralph Ineson	Yes		Yes	Yes	Yes	4
Anya Taylor-Joy	Yes		Yes			2
Willem Dafoe		Yes	Yes	Yes	Yes	4
Aaron Taylor-Johnson				Yes	Yes	2
Lily-Rose Depp				Yes	Yes	2
Kate Dickie	Yes		Yes			2
Jarin Blaschke (cinematographer)	Yes	Yes	Yes	Yes	Yes	5
Louise Ford (editor)	Yes	Yes	Yes	Yes	Yes	5
Craig Lathrop (production designer)	Yes	Yes	Yes	Yes	Yes	5
Linda Muir (costume designer)	Yes	Yes	Yes	Yes	Yes	5
Lars Knudsen (producer)	Yes		Yes			2
Rodrigo Teixeira (producer)	Yes	Yes				2
Arnon Milchan (producer)		Yes	Yes			2
Chris Columbus (executive producer)	Yes	Yes		Yes	Yes	4
Mark Korven (composer)	Yes	Yes				2
Robin Carolan (composer)			Yes	Yes	Yes	3
Sjón (screenwriter)			Yes		Yes	2

== Bibliography ==
- Adrian Gmelch (2023). Art-Horror: The Films of Ari Aster and Robert Eggers. Create Space. ISBN 9798364720719.
