= See Birds =

EP by Balam Acab
- Released: August 16, 2010
- Genre: Witch house
- Length: 20:17
- Label: Tri Angle

Balam Acab chronology
See Birds (2010)	Wander/Wonder (2011)

See Birds is the debut EP by American record producer Alec Koone under the pseudonym Balam Acab. It was released on August 16, 2010, through Tri Angle. It peaked at number 70 on the UK Physical Singles Chart.

== Background ==
See Birds was produced in mono, using online-sourced samples. Balam Acab's Alec Koone explained, "I ran it through tape and vinyl simulators, and it was mastered in the same way, so it has a very specific atmosphere to it." A music video was released for the track "See Birds (Sun)".

== Critical reception ==
Professional ratings
Review scores
Source	Rating
Pitchfork	8.0/10
PopMatters	8/10
Resident Advisor	4.0/5

Jason Cook of Resident Advisor stated, "it's a little less glum than Salem's King Night, but all the more ghostly." Joe Colly of Pitchfork commented that "what's really impressive about Koone's music is how he's able to play with contrast and draw out emotion."

== Legacy ==
One version of the title track, "See Birds", was used in a L'Oréal commercial.

== Track listing ==
See Birds track listing
No.	Title	Length
1.	"See Birds (Moon)"	3:48
2.	"Regret Making Mistakes"	4:18
3.	"Big Boy"	4:31
4.	"Dream Out"	3:51
5.	"See Birds (Sun)"	4:09
Total length:		20:17

== Charts ==
Chart performance for See Birds
Chart (2010)	Peak position
UK Physical Singles (OCC)	70
