= Without Your Love (oOoOO album) =

Studio album by oOoOO
- Released: June 24, 2013
- Genre: Witch house
- Length: 40:47
- Label: Nihjgt Feelings
- Producer: oOoOO

OOoOO chronology
Our Love Is Hurting Us (2012)	Without Your Love (2013)	Faminine Mystique (2018)

Without Your Love is the debut solo studio album by American musician Christopher Dexter Greenspan under the pseudonym oOoOO. It was released on June 24, 2013, through his own record label Nihjgt Feelings. It received generally favorable reviews from critics.

== Background ==
After releasing two EPs through Tri Angle, oOoOO released his debut studio album, Without Your Love, through his own record label Nihjgt Feelings. During the making of the album, he drew inspiration from a local train outside of his apartment window. In a 2013 interview, when asked if "Mouchette" had anything to do with Robert Bresson's film Mouchette, he "told that to him there was no immediate connection, but had realized he had seen the movie around the time he wrote the song." M.L. provided guest vocals on "Stay Here".

As for the album's darkness, he explained: "Even the cover art is nearly black. The whole package is very understated and has a sort of deadpan delivery. If it's dark, it's dark in the sense of being empty."

== Critical reception ==
Professional ratings
Aggregate scores
Source	Rating
Metacritic	69/100
Review scores
Source	Rating
AllMusic	4/5 stars
Consequence	3.5/5 stars
DIY	7/10
Fact	4/5 stars
The Line of Best Fit	7.5/10
MusicOMH	4/5 stars
NME	4/10
Pitchfork	6.7/10
The Skinny	5/5 stars
XLR8R	6/10

According to the review aggregator Metacritic, Without Your Love received "generally favorable reviews" based on a weighted average score of 69 out of 100 from 10 critic scores.

Alex Cull of The Line of Best Fit commented that "Without Your Love finds the San Francisco-based producer successfully forging a refined suite that, while certainly unsettling at times, never loses its focused application of melody or fastidious approach to texture in the pursuit of cheap thrills." Heather Phares of AllMusic stated, "An impressive first full-length from an artist equally adept at intricate productions and affecting songwriting, Without Your Love brings all of Greenspan's talents together in a satisfying whole."

== Track listing ==
Without Your Love track listing
No.	Title	Length
1.	"Sirens"	5:43
2.	"Stay Here"	4:05
3.	"3:51 AM"	2:46
4.	"Without Your Love"	3:15
5.	"On It"	3:52
6.	"Crossed Wires"	3:37
7.	"Mouchette"	3:21
8.	"The South"	3:08
9.	"Misunderstood"	4:36
10.	"5:51 AM"	1:23
11.	"Across a Sea"	5:01
Total length:		40:47
