= Riot Boi =

Studio album by Le1f
- Released: November 13, 2015
- Recorded: 2013–2015
- Genre: Hip-hop
- Length: 42:11
- Labels: XL, Terrible
- Producers: Le1f, Boody, Evian Christ, Balam Acab, Sophie, Dev Hynes, Lunice, Supreme Cuts, Blood Diamonds, Taskforce, Dubbel Dutch, Salva

Le1f chronology
Hey (2014)	Riot Boi (2015)

Riot Boi is the debut studio album by New York-based rapper Le1f. It was released on November 13, 2015 on XL and Terrible. The album features contributions and production work from artists such as Evian Christ, Junglepussy, Balam Acab, Lunice, Boody, Sophie, and Dev Hynes.

== Release and reception ==
Professional ratings
Review scores
Source	Rating
The 405	8.5/10
AllMusic	4/5 stars
Clash	8/10
Consequence of Sound	B
NOW	4/5 stars
The Observer	3/5 stars
Pitchfork	7.5/10

Riot Boi received positive reviews from critics, garnering a score of 78 out of 100 on aggregate site Metacritic. Clash called the album "a trailblazing record very much in the now," describing it as "bombastic, and transgressive." AllMusic wrote that "Riot Boi overwhelms with twists, turns, and surprises, all of which are exhilarating," noting in particular the record's "schizophrenic production that leaps from horny trap to frantic electroclash." Pitchfork wrote that "Riot Boi shows us a trailblazer sitting down among these cracked shards of glass, reckoning with what it means to have come first." Consequence of Sound wrote that "Riot Boi is easily Le1f’s most political music to date, arguing that the album "essentially turns intersectionality talking points into personal identifiers, and they line his sneakily clever raps and touching personal stories."

== Track listing ==
No.	Title	Writer(s)	Producer(s)	Length
1.	"Hi"	Khalif Diouf	Le1f	1:50
2.	"Rage"	Diouf	Balam Acab	4:05
3.	"Grace Alek Naomi"	Diouf; Joshua Leary	Evian Christ; Boody	3:16
4.	"Swirl" (featuring Junglepussy and House of Ladosha)	Antonio Blair; Haldan Blecher; Diouf; Shayna McHayle; Alexander Nutter	Taskforce; Boody	3:38
5.	"Koi"	Diouf	Sophie	3:48
6.	"Umami/Water"	Jake Aron; Blecher; Diouf; Lunice Fermin Pierre II; Leary	Lunice; Le1f; Aron; Boody; Evian Christ	5:36
7.	"Lisa"	Diouf; Paul Salva; Michael Tucker	Blood Diamonds; Salva	2:31
8.	"Chops"	Blecher; Diouf	Le1f; Boody	1:06
9.	"Cheap"	Diouf; Marc Glasser	Dubbel Dutch	3:28
10.	"Taxi"	Diouf; Austin Keultjes; Michael Perry	Supreme Cuts	3:41
11.	"Tell" (featuring DonChristian)	Blecher; Diouf; Don Jones	Boody	4:19
12.	"Change" (featuring Miss Geri and Dev Hynes)	Blecher; Diouf; Artem Emelianov; Dev Hynes	Hynes; Le1f	4:53
Total length:				42:11
