= Fly Zone =

Mixtape by Le1f
- Released: January 28, 2013
- Genre: Hip-hop
- Length: 42:16
- Labels: Greedhead; Camp & Street
- Producers: DJ Hoodcore; Harry B; DJ Blood Everywhere; Lolgurlz; Bot; Neuport; Mess Kid; Shy Guy; Drippin; Souldrop; Helix; Strict Face; Matrixxman

Le1f chronology
Liquid (2012)	Fly Zone (2013)	Tree House (2013)

Fly Zone is the second mixtape by American rapper and producer Le1f. It was released on Greedhead Music and Camp & Street on January 28, 2013.

== Critical reception ==
Professional ratings
Aggregate scores
Source	Rating
Metacritic	78/100
Review scores
Source	Rating
BBC	favorable
Dusted Magazine	favorable
Pitchfork	7.8/10
Rolling Stone	3.5/5 stars

At Metacritic, which assigns a weighted average score out of 100 to reviews from mainstream critics, Fly Zone received an average score of 78, based on 5 reviews, indicating "generally favorable reviews".

Miles Raymer of Pitchfork called the mixtape "an epically audacious record, boiling down to essentially a 13-track demand from Le1f to be allowed access to a mainstream audience without sacrificing a shred of the identity that sets him apart from nearly every rapper a mainstream audience has been drawn to." Mike Diver of BBC stated that "Fly Zone is streamlined, its production consistently excellent despite numerous contributors, none of whom work more than a single track."

=== Accolades ===
Publication	Accolade	Rank	Ref.
Fact	20 Best Mixtapes of 2013	11	
Stereogum	40 Best Rap Albums of 2013	19	
Under the Radar	Top 20 Hip Hop Albums of 2013	8	
Vice	Top 50 Albums of 2013	21	

== Track listing ==
No.	Title	Producer(s)	Length
1.	"Float"	DJ Hoodcore	1:25
2.	"Spa Day"	Harry B	4:08
3.	"Cloud So Loud"	DJ Blood Everywhere	3:15
4.	"Airbending"	Lolgurlz	3:27
5.	"Star Alliance" (featuring Spank Rock)	Bot	3:07
6.	"Breezy"	Neuport	2:42
7.	"Psylock"	Mess Kid	3:56
8.	"The Whip" (featuring Haleek Maul)	Shy Guy	3:38
9.	"Pocahontas" (featuring Kitty)	Drippin	2:06
10.	"Coins"	Drippin; Souldrop	3:24
11.	"So Fly" (featuring Don Jones)	Helix	3:18
12.	"Autopilot" (featuring Safe)	Strict Face	3:45
13.	"Air Max" (featuring Rahel)	Matrixxman	3:57
Total length:			42:16
