= Yes I Smoke Crack =

EP by Salem
- Released: July 15, 2008
- Genre: Witch house
- Label: Acéphale
- Producers: John Holland; Jack Donoghue; Heather Marlatt

Salem chronology
Yes I Smoke Crack (2008)	Water (2008)

Professional ratings
Review scores
Source	Rating
Pitchfork	6.1/10

Yes I Smoke Crack is the debut release from Chicago-based collective Salem. Gaining fast popularity, the EP, limited to 500, sold out in pre-sales. The EP was pressed on white vinyl. A video for the song "Dirt" was produced by the band and gathered public interest due to its odd setting.

In an interview with Butt magazine, John Holland stated that the name of the EP was something he may have seen somewhere and that he just felt it was the right name, in summary.

== Track list ==
1. "Redlights" – 3:38
2. "Snakes" – 2:21
3. "Deepburn" – 2:29
4. "Dirt" – 3:21
