= I'm Still in the Night =

EP by Salem
- Released: November 18, 2011
- Genre: Witch house
- Length: 16:40
- Label: IAMSOUND
- Producers: John Holland; Jack Donoghue; Heather Marlatt

Salem chronology
King Night (2010)	I'm Still in the Night (2011)	Fires in Heaven (2020)

Professional ratings
Review scores
Source	Rating
Pitchfork	6.4/10
Consequence of Sound	positive
A.V. Club	negative

I'm Still in the Night is the third and first major label EP by Salem. The EP was released in digital download and vinyl. The release was limited to 500 copies, like almost all the band's previous releases. The EP itself is a compilation of demos, b-sides and unreleased material from the band's debut album King Night (2010).

== Track listing ==
1. "I'm Still in the Night" – 3:03
2. "Better Off Alone" (Alice Deejay cover) – 7:09
3. "Krawl" – 2:58
4. "Baby Ratta" – 3:29
