= Glass Teeth =

American musical duo

- Origin: Boston, Massachusetts
- Genres: Witch house
- Years active: 2011–present
- Labels: Black Bus; Phantasma Disques
- Members: Xavier Thomas; Joe Reutt

Glass Teeth (stylized as GL▲SS †33†H) are an American electronic duo from Boston, Massachusetts, consisting of Xavier Thomas (also known as Xavier Gath and Xavier Glass) and Joe Reutt.

It began as Thomas's solo project. While going to film school in New York City in late 2009 and early 2010, he began making music to accompany his video projects, which he uploaded to MySpace under the name Glass Teeth. He also DJed under this name. Reutt (who was also going to college around this time and DJing on the side as Grim Trigger) connected with Thomas after a friend informed him that Thomas had played his songs. He dropped his own project to join Glass Teeth around 2013.

Thomas released a self-titled debut EP as Glass Teeth on Black Bus Records in 2011. He also released a split EP with ℑ⊇≥◊≤⊆ℜ as Glass Teeth on Phantasma Disques in 2011.

== Discography ==
- GL▲SS †33†H* / ℑ⊇≥◊≤⊆ℜ – Split (2011)
- GL▲SS †33†H (EP) (2011)
