= Class Actress =

American singer-songwriter

- Birth name: Elizabeth Vanessa Harper
- Born: 1982 or 1983 (age 42–43)
- Origin: Brooklyn, New York, US
- Genres: Synthpop
- Occupations: Singer; songwriter; record producer
- Years active: 2009–present
- Labels: Terrible; Carpark; Casablanca; Republic
- Website: classactress.com

Elizabeth Vanessa Harper (born 1982 or 1983), known professionally as Class Actress, is an American singer, songwriter, and record producer. Class Actress was originally conceived as a trio, consisting of Harper, Mark Richardson, and Scott Rosenthal.

== History ==
=== Formation and early years ===
Harper majored in drama in college and moved to Los Angeles to pursue a career as an actress, but she was unable to make it work and soon found herself disillusioned by it. After relocating to Brooklyn, she decided to pursue a career in music instead. She formed Elizabeth Harper & the Matinee, and in 2004, Harper's self-titled debut solo album was released by UK label Angular Recording Corporation.

Harper later contacted Philadelphia-based producer Mark Richardson, who had remixed a song from her debut album. She preferred Richardson's version to the original, and the two began recording songs at her house, trading Harper's previous guitar-based sound for electronic music, which she had long been interested in exploring. Along with multi-instrumentalist and engineer Scott Rosenthal, Harper and Richardson formed Class Actress—the name being a joke on Harper's original career choice.

=== 2009–2012: Journal of Ardency and Rapprocher ===
Class Actress released their debut extended play, Journal of Ardency, on February 9, 2010, on Terrible Records, which is run by Grizzly Bear's Chris Taylor. The New York Times described it as "an alluringly precise recapturing of the winning chill of early '80s electro-pop". The EP also drew comparisons to New Order, The Human League, and Depeche Mode, while Harper's vocals were likened to those of Blondie's Debbie Harry and Saint Etienne's Sarah Cracknell.

The trio's debut studio album, Rapprocher, was released on October 18, 2011, by Carpark Records. Harper stated that the title—which means "to come closer" in French—was inspired by "a French lover who broke [her] heart". The album received generally positive reviews from music critics, obtaining a rating of 69 out of 100 based on 16 critics on review aggregate site Metacritic. AllMusic named it one of the best indie pop and rock albums of 2011. Rapprocher reached number 21 on Billboard's Dance/Electronic Albums chart and number 27 on the Heatseekers Albums chart. The song "Keep You" was used in an episode of the fifth season of the teen drama television series Gossip Girl.

=== 2013–2015: Movies ===
As a solo artist under the moniker Class Actress, Harper signed to Casablanca Records in 2013. That same year, she moved into a bungalow at The Beverly Hills Hotel in order to write and record songs. Class Actress premiered the track "More Than You" on May 20, 2015, and on June 2, it was announced that her EP Movies would be released on June 23 via Casablanca and Republic Records. Taking inspiration from "the films of '80s excess, glamor and self-discovery", Harper wanted Movies to tell "a dark story of a woman who explores the glamorous fantasy life of a Hollywood party girl." The EP was executive-produced by Giorgio Moroder and Evan Bogart, and features production by Harper herself, Moroder, Neon Indian, and Mess Kid.

=== 2016–present: New music ===
On June 30, 2016, Class Actress premiered a song titled "Glass Ceiling", along with an accompanying music video, through Terrible Records. The track was produced by Mess Kid.

== Discography ==
=== Studio albums ===
Title
Rapprocher
Album details
- Released: October 18, 2011
- Label: Carpark
- Formats: CD, LP, digital download
Notes

Track listing
No.	Title	Length
1.	"Keep You"	3:14
2.	"Love Me Like You Used To"	3:51
3.	"Weekend"	4:01
4.	"Prove Me Wrong"	3:52
5.	"Need to Know"	4:12
6.	"Limousine"	4:26
7.	"All the Saints" (omitted from LP edition)	4:24
8.	"Bienvenue"	2:58
9.	"Missed"	4:23
10.	"Hangin' On"	3:16
11.	"Let Me In"	4:54

=== Extended plays ===
Title
Album details
Notes
Journal of Ardency
- Released: February 9, 2010
- Label: Terrible
- Formats: CD, 10", digital download

Track listing
No.	Title	Length
1.	"Careful What You Say"	5:12
2.	"Journal of Ardency"	3:45
3.	"Let Me Take You Out"	3:18
4.	"Adolescent Heart"	3:16
5.	"Someone Real"	7:32
6.	"Terminally Chill" (bonus track)	3:45

Movies
- Released: June 23, 2015
- Label: Casablanca, Republic
- Format: Digital download

Track listing
No.	Title	Length
1.	"More Than You"	4:07
2.	"The Limit"	4:08
3.	"High on Love"	2:59
4.	"GFE"	3:09
5.	"Love My Darkness"	4:31
6.	"Movies"	4:26

=== Music videos ===
Title	Year	Director(s)
"Journal of Ardency"	2010	Patrick Cleandenim
"Adolescent Heart"	2010	Jessica Lauretti
"Let Me Take You Out"	2011	Brett Haley
"Weekend"	2011	Bek Andersen
"Bienvenue"	2012	Clement Gino and Gregory Faure
"Need to Know"	2012	Jessica Lauretti
"More Than You"	2015	John Merizalde
"GFE"	2015	Rachel Maude and Gabriel Reilich
