= No Bra (band) =

English electronic pop band

- Origin: London, UK
- Genres: Pop
- Years active: 2003–present
- Label: Muskel
- Members: Susanne Oberbeck
- Past members: Fanny Paul Clinton; Dale Cornish
- Website: nobra.co.uk

No Bra is musical artist Susanne Oberbeck's stage name and solo act, a NYC-based electronic musician, songwriter, performer, producer and filmmaker. She has released three albums.

== History ==
Born in Germany, Oberbeck moved to London to study art at Camberwell College of Arts. She went on to study film directing and screenwriting at Columbia University in New York before returning to London and deciding to focus on music.

Oberbeck formed No Bra with Fanny Paul Clinton in east London, England in 2003, taking the band name from a tabloid headline about Rachel Stevens.

No Bra was then described as an industrial/electronic band, combining "electronic pop and industrial grooves with sinister Germanic folk."

Clinton left No Bra in 2004 and was replaced by Dale Cornish. The band had an underground hit with their first single "Munchausen", in 2005 which was included in BBC Radio 1 DJ Pete Tong's 'best of 2005' list and the Rough Trade best of 2005 compilation. It was named Tong's 'Eclectic Tune of 2005' and James Hyman's 'Tune of the Year 2005' and was described as "essentially the London art-school answer to (LCD Soundsystem song) "Losing My Edge"'s Williamsburg smack down".

Early in 2006, Cornish left (initially joining Baraclough and later working as a solo artist), and No Bra became Susanne Oberbeck's solo project.

She released No Bra's first album, Dance and Walk, in November 2006.

The track "Doherfuckher" was used as part of the sound track to Bruce La Bruce's film Otto or up With Dead People.

In 2007, the Dutch Scapino Ballet based a ballet performance on No Bra's music which toured around Europe. Despite claiming to be "not gay", No Bra's Susanne was nominated as their gay icon by influential British post punk band The Raincoats, and asked to perform with them at the gay icons exhibition at the National Portrait Gallery, London in 2009. No Bra also appears in the upcoming documentary about The Raincoats. The musician's image has inspired several visual artists such as Christophe Chemin and Brian Kenny and photographer Wolfgang Tillmans.

In 2008, No Bra performed as part of Creative Time's "Hey hey Glossolalia" performance series with Rammellzee, Genesis Breyer P-Orridge, Ian Svenonius, Mark Leckey and others in New York.

No Bra has toured Europe and North America with The Gossip, Savages, Patrick Wolf and others, and performed at numerous live venues and night clubs and galleries including Centre Georges Pompidou, Tate Gallery, the Hayward Gallery, MoMa (with the Raincoats), Artists Space, The Institute of Contemporary Arts London and Future Feminism at the Hole Gallery.

In 2010, No Bra relocated to New York City, where she recorded with a live band as well as touring the US and Europe. Her performance videos were included in MoMA PS1's "New York Now" 2010 exhibition.

In 2011, No Bra started the weekly Gay Vinyl club night in Lower Manhattan with regular guest DJs Hood By Air designer Shayne Oliver, Arca (musician), Telfar, Juliana Huxtable and other NYC based musicians and DJs, which ran until 2016.

In September 2013, No Bra released her second album Candy. It was included in Johanna Fateman's "Best of 2013" list in Artforum.

In 2014, No Bra was featured on the track "Lukas" on Mykki Blanco's album Gay Dog Food.

In 2016, No Bra was commissioned by Bruce LaBruce to write a title track for his movie The Misandrists.

In 2018, No Bra had an art exhibition at Goswell Road Gallery in Paris, showing film and photography.

In 2019, No Bra collaborated with Venezuelan producer Arca (musician) and performed with her at Sónar festival in Barcelona.

No Bra's third album Love & Power was released in November 2019, featuring a guest appearance by Baltimore musician Abdu Ali and cover art by Wolfgang Tillmans.

== Discography ==
=== Albums ===
- Dance and Walk (2006), Muskel
- Candy (2013), self released
- Love & Power (2019), Muskel

=== Singles ===
- "Munchausen" / "X Sauna" (2005), Muskel
- "Noise Pollution" / "No Woman No Crime" (2006), Muskel
- "Super Subway Comedian" (w. Klaxons and Alan Vega) (Blast First Petite) (2009), Blast First petite
- "Minger" / "New Hero" (2010)
- "18th floor" (2026), Muskel

=== Appearances ===
- "Lukas" (feat. No Bra) Mykki Blanco, Gay Dog Food, UNO NYC (2014)
- "Witch" (feat. No Bra) Arca, kick iiii, XL (2021)
- "no bra" (feat. No Bra) NEW YORK, Rapstar*, Relaxin Records (2024)

==== Compilation appearances ====
- "Date with the Devil" Jerk Off compilation, Jerk Off (2011)
- "Minger" (These New Puritans Remix) "Tapes" The Big Pink Compilation (K7 Records) (2010)
- "Munchausen" Rough Trade Counter Culture 2005 compilation (V2 records) (2006)
- "In your Jeans" Electronic Bible 2 (White Label Records) (2006)
- "No Woman No Crime" Girl Monster compilation (Chicks on Speed Records) (2006)
- "Munchausen" (The Most Mix) Independence Mix Vol.1, Independence Records (2006)
- "Dance and Walk" White Light artists' compilation, White Light Gallery (2007)
- "Fags in a time tunnel" Visionnaire Magazine Sound Issue (2007)
- "New Girls" GLU Magazine Compilation (2008)
- "Doherfuckher" on soundtrack to Bruce La Bruce's "Otto or Up with Dead People" (Crippled Dick Hot Wax/SPV) (2008)
- "She was a Butcher" No Bra compilation, De Player Rotterdam (2009)
- "Super Subway Comedian" Alan Vega 70th Birthday Limited Edition EP Series (2009)
