= Fires in Heaven =

Studio album by Salem
- Released: October 30, 2020
- Genres: Witch house; electronica; glitch hop; trap
- Length: 30:00
- Label: Decent Distribution
- Producers: John Holland; Jack Donoghue; Shlohmo; Lars Stalfors

Salem chronology
I'm Still in the Night (2011)	Fires in Heaven (2020)	Red Dragon (2026)

Singles from Fires in Heaven
- 1. "Starfall" Released: September 18, 2020; 2. "Red River" Released: October 16, 2020

Professional ratings
Review scores
Source	Rating
Clash Magazine	8/10
Exclaim!	6/10
Pitchfork	7/10

Fires in Heaven is the second studio album by American witch house band Salem. It was released on October 30, 2020 via Mad Decent's Decent Distribution.

The album marks Salem’s return to music after a near ten-year hiatus, as well as the band’s first album without founding member Heather Marlatt. It was preceded by the lead single "Starfall", which was released on September 18, 2020 along its music video. It follows the band's trip with veteran storm trackers through Tulsa, Oklahoma and Dallas as well as through Texas during tornado season. It was directed by Donoghue and Holland along Tommy Malekoff. Along its pre-order on October 16, a second single called "Red River" was unveiled. The cover art used for the album is the oil painting 'Awakening' by Nicole Besack.

== Track listing ==
All songs written and produced by Salem, except where noted.

No.	Title	Writer(s)	Producer(s)	Length
1.	"Capulets (Note: "Capulets" is only included on the digital edition of the album.)"			1:56
2.	"Fires in Heaven"			2:08
3.	"Crisis"	Jack Donoghue; John Holland; Henry Laufer		2:10
4.	"Sears Tower"	Donoghue; Holland; Laufer		3:07
5.	"Starfall"		Salem; Lars Stalfors	2:48
6.	"Wings"	Donoghue; Holland; Laufer		2:56
7.	"Red River"	Donoghue; Holland; Laufer	Salem; Shlohmo	3:46
8.	"Old Gods"	Donoghue; Holland; Laufer		3:01
9.	"Braids"			1:22
10.	"DieWithMe"	Donoghue; Holland; Laufer		2:54
11.	"Not Much of a Life"			3:32

== Notes ==
Capulets is also available as a 7" flexi with the Japanese yellow vinyl album release of Fires in Heaven.
