= Gate of Grief (album) =

Studio album by White Ring
- Released: July 27, 2018
- Recorded: 2012–2017
- Genre: Witch house
- Length: 47:39
- Label: Rocket Girl
- Producer: Bryan Kurkimilis

Singles from Gate of Grief
- 1. "Burn It Down" Released: March 2, 2018; 2. "Leprosy" Released: April 6, 2018; 3. "Nothing" Released: May 11, 2018

Professional ratings
Aggregate scores
Source	Rating
Metacritic	76/100
Review scores
Source	Rating
AllMusic	4/5 stars
Sputnikmusic	3.5/5 stars

Gate of Grief is the debut studio album by American band White Ring. It was released in July 2018 under Rocket Girl Records.

== Track listing ==
No.	Title	Writer(s)	Producer(s)	Length
1.	"Heavy Self Alienation"	Adina Viarengo; Bryan Kurkimilis	Kurkimilis	3:36
2.	"Leprosy"	Kurkimilis; Kendra Malia	Kurkimilis	2:38
3.	"Angels"	Kurkimilis; Malia	Kurkimilis	3:46
4.	"Close Yr Eyes"	Kurkimilis; Malia	Kurkimilis	3:07
5.	"Fields of Hate"	Kurkimilis; Malia	Kurkimilis	3:07
6.	"Low" (featuring Fostercare)	Kurkimilis; Fostercare	Kurkimilis	3:23
7.	"Puppy"	Kurkimilis	Kurkimilis	1:59
8.	"Chained (Interlude)"	Kurkimilis; Malia	Kurkimilis	3:23
9.	"Nothing"	Viarengo; Kurkimilis	Kurkimilis	4:16
10.	"Lasts In"	Viarengo; Kurkimilis	Kurkimilis	3:16
11.	"Amerika (Lord of the Flies)"	Viarengo; Kurkimilis	Kurkimilis	3:04
12.	"Home of the Brave"	Viarengo; Kurkimilis	Kurkimilis	3:50
13.	"Burn It Down"	Kurkimilis	Kurkimilis	2:43
14.	"Do U Love Me 2?"	Kurkimilis; Michael Cretu; Andru Donalds	Kurkimilis	5:31
Total length:				47:39

Notes

- "Do U Love Me 2?" samples "Je t'aime Till My Dying Day" by Enigma, from their 2008 album Seven Lives Many Faces.
