= Wander/Wonder =

Studio album by Balam Acab
- Released: August 29, 2011
- Genre: Electronic
- Length: 36:44
- Label: Tri Angle
- Producer: Alec Koone

Balam Acab chronology
See Birds (2010)	Wander/Wonder (2011)	Child Death (2015)

Wander/Wonder is the debut studio album by American record producer Alec Koone under the pseudonym Balam Acab. It was released on August 29, 2011, through Tri Angle. It received generally favorable reviews from critics.

== Background ==
Balam Acab's Alec Koone recorded Wander/Wonder in the house where he grew up. The album includes Creative Commons-licensed recordings that he found online. He mixed the album with Sam Haar of Blondes.

== Critical reception ==
Professional ratings
Aggregate scores
Source	Rating
Metacritic	76/100
Review scores
Source	Rating
AllMusic	4/5 stars
Beats Per Minute	87%
Cokemachineglow	72%
Fact	4/5 stars
The Phoenix	3/4 stars
Pitchfork	8.2/10
Resident Advisor	4/5
Slant Magazine	3.5/5 stars
Tiny Mix Tapes	3/5 stars

According to the review aggregator Metacritic, Wander/Wonder received "generally favorable reviews" based on a weighted average score of 76 out of 100 from 14 critic scores.

Andrew Graham of The Phoenix described the album as "a fully fleshed-out record, with enticing dimension and its own subtle meanings." Mark Richardson of Pitchfork commented that "its primary concern is simple aesthetic beauty, the way a small and specific combination of sounds, carefully arranged but given room to breathe, can have a deep emotional impact." Heather Phares of AllMusic stated, "See Birds was just five songs long, but it covered more musical territory; by contrast, Wander/Wonder is an exercise in depth, a flowing suite of mermaid's lullabies that turn seductive." She added, "Though it's a very different journey than See Birds, Wander/Wonder is another testament to Koone's abilities as a sensitive and evocative producer."

Kevin Liedel of Slant Magazine commented that "Any abiding temptation to throw Wander/Wonder into the witch-house pile stems directly from Koone's reliance on chunky, creeping drum machines, but drowsy percussion is where the similarities end." He added, "Balam Acab's sound is more dream than dread, a patchwork of sleepy instrumentation, elfin vocal samples, and sound effects meant to evoke the watery clockwork of a seafloor vista." Will Ryan of Beats Per Minute stated, "Vocal fragments are turned into helium-voiced singers and the movements and peaks in the tracks push Acab's emotional affect to a startling degree, not to mention well beyond simple melodic proficiency." Andrew Ryce of Resident Advisor described the album as "the kind of record that can pull you into its emotional undertow from the minute those helium angels start singing."

=== Accolades ===
Year-end lists for Wander/Wonder
Publication	List	Rank	Ref.
Beats Per Minute	The Top 50 Albums of 2011	37	
Fact	The 50 Best Albums of 2011	37	
The Wire	Top 50 Releases of 2011	17	
XLR8R	Best Releases of 2011	4	

== Track listing ==
All tracks are written by Alec Koone.

Wander/Wonder track listing
No.	Title	Length
1.	"Welcome"	5:10
2.	"Apart"	3:00
3.	"Motion"	4:03
4.	"Expect"	4:46
5.	"Now Time"	4:07
6.	"Oh, Why"	4:11
7.	"Await"	4:46
8.	"Fragile Hope"	6:31
Total length:		36:44

== Personnel ==
Credits adapted from liner notes.

- Alec Koone – production, mixing
- Sam Haar – mixing
- Emmette Murkett – photography

== Charts ==
Chart performance for Wander/Wonder
Chart (2011)	Peak position
US Top Dance/Electronic Albums (Billboard)	20
