= SWRMXS =

Remix album by HIM
- Released: 7 December 2010
- Genre: Electronic
- Length: 63:32
- Label: Sire, Reprise

HIM chronology
Screamworks: Love in Theory and Practice (2010)	SWRMXS (2010)	XX – Two Decades of Love Metal (2012)

SWRMXS is a remix album by Finnish band HIM. It features remix versions of songs featured on their seventh studio album Screamworks: Love in Theory and Practice. Pre-orders began on 12 November 2010, and the album was released on 7 December 2010. In a story told by Valo (according to the official H.I.M. Facebook page), he created the cover for the album late one night after seeing the image in a dream. He went downstairs, broke a VHS tape open, and carefully arranged the tape into a heartagram.

== Track listing ==
1. "In Venere Veritas" (Huoratron Remix) – 6:33
2. "In the Arms of Rain" (Salem Remix) – 3:37
3. "The Foreboding Sense of Impending Happiness" (Morgan Page Remix) – 6:10
4. "Ode to Solitude" (Gavin Russom Remix) – 9:30
5. "Heartkiller" (The Mercyfvcks Remix) – 3:25
6. "Love, the Hardest Way" (Tiësto Remix) – 6:27
7. "Shatter Me with Hope" (oOoOO Remix) – 4:30
8. "Dying Song" (Jay Lamar & Jesse Oliver Remix) – 6:36
9. "Disarm Me (With Your Loneliness)" (VV Remix) – 4:42
10. "Scared to Death" (Diamond Cut Remix) – 5:41
11. "Acoustic Funeral" / "Like St. Valentine" / "Katherine Wheel" (ÖÖ Megamix) – 6:18

_{The 11th track is remixed by HIM vocalist Ville Valo and his brother Jesse Valo under the alias ÖÖ.}
