= Crim3s =

English electronic duo

CRIM3S
- Also known as: Story of Isaac
- Origin: London, England
- Genres: Electropunk; witch house
- Years active: 2011–2018
- Label: Black Bus Records | Pale Noir
- Members: Rou Rot (Isaac); Sadie Pinn
- Website: www.crim3s.co.uk

Crim3s (stylised in all caps), formerly known as Story of Isaac, was an English electronic duo from London. The group consisted of Rou Rot and Sadie Pinn, who met while living in a warehouse in North London.

They debuted with a self-titled EP on Black Bus Records in December 2011. In 2013, they self-released their second EP, Stay Ugly. They were part of the 2017's Sound of Stockholm lineup.

== Biography ==
Rou Rot and Sadie Pinn met in the Monkey Farm, a North London warehouse where they used to live. Rot was seeking a singer for the music he composed, and decided to work with Pinn after their first recording tries. After being evicted on short notice, they were left homeless for a period of a year: "Our first ep [sic] was made when we were homeless, each track in a different environment. We’ve written tracks in garages, railway arches, office blocks, garden sheds and a law students uni room." They made a name for themselves as organizers and DJs of illegal squat raves in London and were described by Electronic Beats as "pure punk in the truest sense, possessed of a strong DIY spirit and a no-fucks-given attitude." Rot has cited their lifestyle as an inspiration for their name: "Being chased by police and opening buildings to squat is a funny way to live. The harsh reality of life – not just for us, but the people we see around us every day – is what our music is about, and the reason why we're called CRIM3S."

== Discography ==
=== Extended plays ===
As Story of Isaac:

- Incantation II (2011) (Split with Eyedoublecross)

As Crim3s:

- Crim3s (2011)
- Stay Ugly (2013)

=== Singles ===
As Story of Isaac (both re-labeled as Crim3s):

- "New Flesh" (2010)
- "Holes" (2011)

As Crim3s:

- "Germs" (2011)
- "Still Goin" (2013)
- "Militia" (2016)

=== Remixes ===
As Crim3s:

- "I'm God" [by Clams Casino] (2011)
- "Inferno" [by BATHAUS] (2012)
- "Desire" [by Dilly Dally] (2016)

As Story of Isaac:

- "Dancing in Slow Motion" [by Teengirl Fantasy] (2010)
- "Crimewave" [by Crystal Castles] (2010)
- "Black Panther" [by Crystal Castles] (2010)
- "Baptism" [by Crystal Castles] (2010)
- "Hologram" [by These New Puritans] (2010)
- "∞" [by PARTY TRASH, with Drugs for Drunks] (2011)
- "Feather" [by White Ring] (2011)
- "Sunday Best" [by You Love Her Coz She's Dead] (2011)
- "Intimate" [by Crystal Castles] (2012)

=== Mixtapes ===
As CRIM3S:

- "SaAaAaVemEe" (2011)
- "DESTROY CULTURE MIXTAPE" (2011)
- "NEW YORK S!CK MIX" (2011)
- "CRIM3S SUPERSUPER! Mix" (2012)
- "LOGO MIX" (2013)

As Story of Isaac:

- "December Drag" (2010)
- "Overdose" (2010)
- "† † Haunted House † † Mix" (2010)
- "Summer Drag" (2011)
- "Forty Ounce Mixtape" (2011)

=== Videos ===
- "Meet Me Half Dead" [directed by Zephyr Mann] (2011)
- "Drawn" [directed by Crim3s] (2011)
- "Lost" [directed by Oohh Mmyy Godd] (2013)
