= Red Dragon (album) =

Compilation album by Salem
- Released: May 14, 2026
- Recorded: 2007–2015, 2025
- Genre: Witch house
- Length: 101:47
- Label: Many Hats
- Producers: John Holland; Jack Donoghue; Heather Martlatt

Salem chronology
| Fires in Heaven (2020) | Red Dragon (2026) |

Red Dragon is a 2026 compilation album by American witch house band Salem, surprise released on May 14, 2026, via Many Hats. Its release coincided with a collaboration with the skateboarding brand Supreme. The album contains 31 tracks at nearly two hours in length, containing mostly previously released tracks from 2007–2015, with four previously unreleased tracks ("Blood Brothers", "EveryDay", "Drive by", and "Daughter"). Because most of its material is made up of old B-sides and unreleased tracks, previous member Heather Martlatt appears on most of the album.

Professional ratings
Review scores
| Source | Rating |
|---|---|
| Pitchfork | 7.5/10 |

== Track listing ==
Red Dragon track listing
| No. | Title | Year | Length |
|---|---|---|---|
| 1. | "Lucy Fur" | 2007 | 1:06 |
| 2. | "Snakes" | 2008 | 2:21 |
| 3. | "Tent" | 2008 | 4:03 |
| 4. | "Withoutu" | 2008 | 3:44 |
| 5. | "Red Dragon" | 2014 | 3:20 |
| 6. | "Vampyre" | 2007 | 2:17 |
| 7. | "Salt Lick" | 2009 | 3:27 |
| 8. | "Kin" | 2008 | 4:57 |
| 9. | "$or3$" | 2010 | 4:47 |
| 10. | "Down2 Da River" | 2010 | 4:49 |
| 11. | "The Winner" | 2015 | 1:37 |
| 12. | "Babyboi" | 2010 | 2:35 |
| 13. | "Piggyhog" | 2007 | 2:28 |
| 14. | "Hoer" | 2010 | 2:50 |
| 15. | "Every Mothers Son" | 2012 | 3:36 |
| 16. | "Everyday" | 2026 | 2:24 |
| 17. | "Hoodrych" | 2007 | 3:25 |
| 18. | "Blood Brothers" | 2026 | 4:06 |
| 19. | "Sex" | 2011 | 3:48 |
| 20. | "Dance4me" | 2008 | 3:49 |
| 21. | "Iaint" | 2007 | 2:52 |
| 22. | "Theboybysea" | 2008 | 3:37 |
| 23. | "Haffa" | 2008 | 3:40 |
| 24. | "You Don't Have to Be Pretty Anymore" | 2011 | 4:18 |
| 25. | "Drive By" | 2026 | 2:22 |
| 26. | "Dirty Poor" | 2012 | 2:17 |
| 27. | "Vomit" | 2008 | 4:07 |
| 28. | "Daughter" | 2026 | 2:40 |
| 29. | "Rip Joni Jarvis & Chinese" | 2010 | 2:48 |
| 30. | "Outsidedanight" | 2010 | 4:15 |
| 31. | "Dirt" | 2007 | 3:22 |
| Total length: | | | 101:47 |

== Personnel ==
Salem

- Jack Donoghue – rapping vocals, drum programming
- John Holland – singing vocals, guitar, production, synthesizers
- Heather Marlatt – singing vocals, keyboards
