= DonChristian =

American rapper

DonChristian Jones
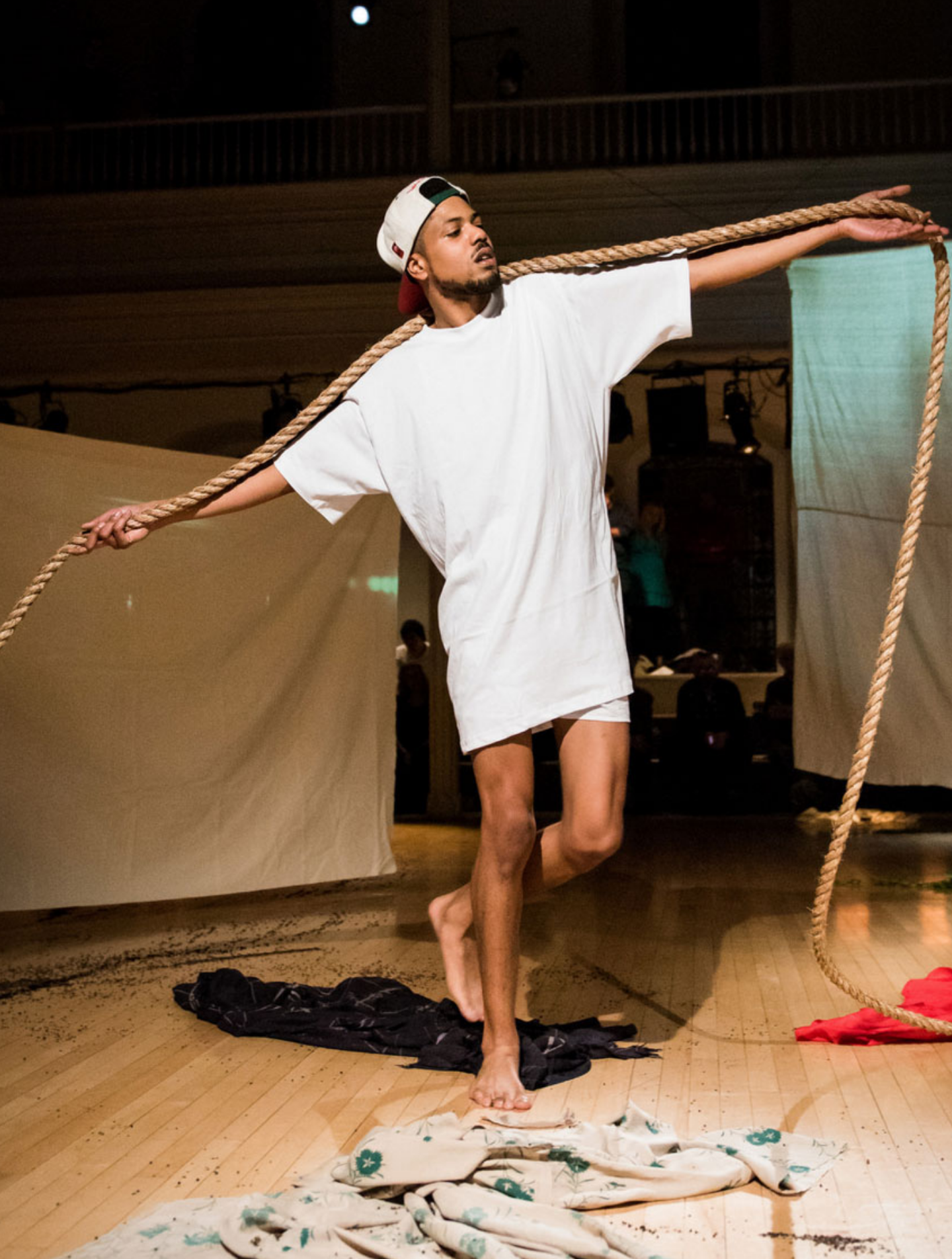
- DonChristian Body In Place 2016

Background information
- Born: DonChristian Jones; December 20, 1989 (age 36); Germantown, Philadelphia
- Genres: Rap, hip hop, alternative R&B
- Occupations: Artist; composer; director; educator; producer; organizer
- Years active: 2012–present
- Labels: Camp & Street, Greadhead
- Website: www.donchristian.world

DonChristian Jones, also known as DonChristian, is a New York-based is a multi-media, artist, musician, and director. His work spans musical and visual performances, installations, and community murals, blending both genres of painting and hip-hop and referencing classical and contemporary styles. Jones is a founding member and creative director of Public Assistants, a design and production lab focused on mutual aid, programming, and worldbuilding nestled in between Bed-Stuy and Bushwick, Brooklyn.

== Early life ==
DonChristian was born and raised in Germantown, Philadelphia. DonChristian attended a Pennsylvanian George School in as a teenager. His father was also a musician and his uncle is the late soul singer Teddy Pendergrass. Jones graduated from Wesleyan University in 2012, where he studied painting. After graduating from college, he moved to New York City to pursue art and music. There, Don took on day jobs teaching and painting while performing at night. Don is currently the inaugural Adobe Creative Resident at The Museum of Modern Art.

== Work ==
While at Wesleyan University Don was president of The Eclectic Society (fraternity).He is a member of the Camp & Street collective, having collaborated on projects alongside members like Boody, Rahel and Le1f. In 2013 DonChristian released his first mixtape, The Wayfarer on Camp & Street and Himanshu Suri's Greedhead Music label. In August 2014, Vogue.com exclusively released the single "Green Dream" produced by Suicideyear. Later that year, he released his second mixtape Renzo Piano, inspired by the Italian architect after whom the tape is named. The Quietus named his 2014 mixtape Renzo Piano one of the best albums of the year. In 2015 DonChristian presented Camp & Street at the New Whitney Block Party, with acts including Le1f, Junglepussy, and House of Ladosha. He later performed at the 2015 Whitney Museum of American Art Annual Art Party. In 2016, DonChristian performed original works as part of Eiko Otake series A Body in Places at the St. Mark's Church in-the-Bowery. DonChristian's debut album, Where There's Smoke, was released in July 2018. Don has also shown and performed in spaces such as The Whitney Museum, MoMA PS1, New Museum, Brooklyn Museum, and The Shed. Much of his work today is informed by his time spent painting murals on Rikers Island with incarcerated youth, and teaching at Harvey Milk HS/Hetrick-Martin Institute.

Don's musical influences range from artists such as Eric Fischl, Eiko & Koma, and musical acts Outkast and Three 6 Mafia.

== Discography ==
=== Albums ===
- Where There's Smoke (2018)
- Don (2021)

=== Mixtapes ===
- The Wayfarer (2013)
- Renzo Piano (2014)

=== Music videos ===
Song	Year	Director	Ref.
"My Crew"	2013	Sam Jones	
"Clerk"	2014	Sam Jones	
"Odysseus"	2014	Jake Kindlon	
"Lui Kang"	2015	Monster Movies	
"Chop"	2016	Sam Jones	
"Been Sleep" (feat. Ms. Boogie)	2017	Jake Kindlon & DonChristian Jones	
"Where There's Smoke"	2018	DonChristian Jones	
"Crash" (feat. bbymutha)	2018	Julian Sharifi, DonChristian Jones, Rafe Scobey-Thal	
"Savings"	2018	Unknown	
