= Mykki Blanco & the Mutant Angels =

EP by Mykki Blanco
- Released: May 15, 2012
- Genre: Industrial music
- Labels: OHWOW; UNO

Mykki Blanco chronology
Mykki Blanco & the Mutant Angels (2012)	Cosmic Angel: The Illuminati Prince/ss (2012)

Singles from Mykki Blanco & the Mutant Angels
- 1. "Join My Militia" Released: May 14, 2012; 2. "Head Is a Stone" Released: July 18, 2012

Mykki Blanco & the Mutant Angels is the first extended play (EP) by American rapper Mykki Blanco, released on May 15, 2012.

== Background ==
The EP is based on Blanco's 2011 poetry book From the Silence of Duchamp to the Noise of Boys and revolves around the story of an African American transvestite who experiments with sex, drugs, and the occult in New York City.

== Critical reception ==
Professional ratings
Review scores
Source	Rating
Now	3/4 stars
SPIN	7/10

Kevin Ritchie, writing for Now, commented, "From the first few bars of Head is a Stone, [...] tribal drums, burbling guitar riffs and distorted, unhinged screaming set us off on a tormented journey that splooges visceral menace all over our ears. Along the way are nods to Hendrix and hardcore, but it’s Blanco’s ability to go absolutely mental that’s most fun."

== Promotion ==
=== Singles ===
"Head is a Stone" was officially released as the EP's first single on 7-inch vinyl through OHWOW and UNO. The single's release featured the song "Avenue D" as a b-side. Nick Hooker, who directed the music video for the song, had previously directed the music video for "Corporate Cannibal" by Grace Jones. The music video for "Head is a Stone" was filmed on the rooftops of The Ansonia and in Chinatown, Manhattan. ChartAttack's Jon Pappo described the song as "a sonic crash to the cranium, where the pounding drums are hammers splitting open your skull so she can pour her distorted fiery contents directly into the pit of your stomach."

=== Music videos ===
"Join My Militia" was released as the EP's first music video on May 14, 2012. The music video was directed by Mitch Moore. Jon Pappo, in his review for ChartAttack, praised the song for "coarsely switching between different registers, from a feminine wispy drawl to a deep guttural bark, Mykki Blanco is dismantling (or, demolishing) any preconceived notions you may have had about what it means to be a rapper." SPIN's Julianne Escobedo Shepherd commented, "the song embodies what critics see as a city-wide reclamation of the grit that defines NYC, an aggressive, snarling stance from the fringes that dares anyone to step to her."

== Track listing ==
No.	Title	Length
1.	"Intro (From the Silence of Duchamp)"	1:20
2.	"Head Is a Stone"	4:18
3.	"Chinatown"	3:36
4.	"Avenue D"	3:14
5.	"Freak Jerk"	4:03
6.	"Cum"	2:43
7.	"Gay Dog"	8:59
8.	"Join My Militia"	4:12
