= Hey (EP) =

EP by Le1f
- Released: March 11, 2014
- Genre: Hip-hop
- Length: 22:37
- Label: Terrible

Le1f chronology
Tree House (2013)	Hey (2014)	Riot Boi (2015)

Professional ratings
Review scores
Source	Rating
DIY	4/5 stars
Pitchfork	7.6/10
The 405	8.5/10

Hey is the label debut EP by American rapper/producer Le1f, released on March 11, 2014 on the Terrible. The EP also marks the first official hip-hop release for Terrible Records, aside from Solange's 2013 single "Looks Good with Trouble" that featured Kendrick Lamar.

== Track listing ==
Standard edition
No.	Title	Producer(s)	Length
1.	"Hey"		3:22
2.	"Sup"		3:32
3.	"Boom"	Dubbel Dutch	3:26
4.	"Wut"	5kinAndBone5^{[A]}	2:47
5.	"Buzz"		3:29
Total length:			16:36

Bonus track
No.	Title	Producer(s)	Length
6.	"Nah"	Taskforce	2:03
Total length:			18:39

A "Wut" wasn't rerecorded, but rather cleaned up by Daniel Lynas to match the production quality throughout the record.
