= Cosmic Angel: The Illuminati Prince/ss =

Mixtape by Mykki Blanco
- Released: November 9, 2012 (digital download)
- Genre: Alternative hip-hop
- Length: 44:55
- Label: UNO
- Producers: Brenmar, Flosstradamus, Gobby, Le1f, Matrixxman, and Sinden

Mykki Blanco chronology
Mykki Blanco & the Mutant Angels (2012)	Cosmic Angel: The Illuminati Prince/ss (2012)	Betty Rubble: The Initiation (2013)

Singles from Cosmic Angel: The Illuminati Prince/ss
- 1. "Wavvy" Released: Aug 21, 2012; 2. "Haze.Boogie.Life" Released: October 12, 2012; 3. "Kingpinning (Ice Cold)" Released: January 25, 2013

Cosmic Angel: The Illuminati Prince/ss is a mixtape by American rapper Mykki Blanco. It was released on November 9, 2012.

== Background ==
The mixtape includes audio clips from the American animated television series X-Men and dialogue from the 1985 film The Color Purple.

== Critical reception ==
Professional ratings
Review scores
Source	Rating
Pitchfork	6.8/10
Spin	favorable

Exclaim! placed the mixtape at number ten on its list of the top ten rap mixtapes of 2012 and wrote, "Gender-bending femme fatale Mykki Blanco [...] kind of sat somewhere on the outer reaches of hip-hop and industrial for her earlier mix Mykki Blanco & the Mutant Angels [...], but the MC tweaked her rap game for the still totally out-there Cosmic Angel: The Illuminati Prince/ss." Pitchfork's Carrie Battan commented, "When both personas bubble out of Blanco in fierce equal measure in a verse, it's gut-punching [...] Where Cosmic Angel: The Illuminati Prince/ss falls short is in the bloated middle ground between club and camp." Spin's Brandon Soderberg opined, "One would be advised to also think of Blanco and Quattlebaum Jr. as not all that different from, say, Rick Ross and William Roberts [...] Not that Blanco is singularly focused on penetrating hip-hop's mainstream and fucking up the system from the inside. Frequently, she plays up her difference, framing herself as a monster taking over." Tiny Mix Tapes placed the mixtape at number fifty on its list of fifty favorite albums of 2012. Stefan Wharton, in his review for Tiny Mix Tapes, wrote, "Immersed in a sea of dolphins, octopuses, and underwater aesthetics, 2012 got pretty wavvy, while Mykki Blanco’s Cosmic Angel: Illuminati Prince/ss mixtape employed the dank beats of post-corporeal producers like Nightfeelings and Matrixxman to submerge our ears deeper into the abyss with a distinctly gritty mutation."

== Promotion ==
In January 2013, Blanco performed the songs "Haze.Boogie.Life" and "Kinpinning" live in front of a seapunk green screen for Pitchfork's YouTube channel. In March 2013, his song "Kingpinning" was featured on the mixtape Wood Wood by Diplo.

=== Singles ===
"Wavvy" was officially released as the first single off Cosmic Angel: The Illuminati Prince/ss on Aug 21, 2012. The music video for the song was directed by Francesco Carrozzini. Alex Frank, writing for The Fader, commented that Blanco's rap was "versatile enough to jump on beats easy, using both sides of that gender binary perfectly (and everything in between) by somehow making this song mega-masculine and super bitchy at the same time." Pitchfork's Carrie Battan wrote that "she's high and clear in the mix rapping with unflinching urgency for nearly four minutes straight over a spine-tingling tropical cascade of a beat."

=== Music videos ===
"Haze.Boogie.Life" was released as the second music video from the mixtape and premiered on Pitchfork's YouTube channel on October 11, 2012. The music video was directed by Danny Sangra. Clash's Robin Murray praised the song, "Taut and full of space, the production is matched by Blanco's stuttering, biting flow resulting in something which seems to scratch against your skin."

The mixtape's third music video for the song "Kingpinning" was released on January 25, 2013. The music video was directed by Clarence Fuller and features appearances by Dev Hynes, Le1f, and Analisa Teachworth. Michael Cragg, writing for The Guardian, commented, "Like her breakthrough single Wavvy, Kingpinning was produced by Brenmar who frames Blanco's audacious and laidback flow with brittle beats, ghostly synths and rapid-fire drum claps to create something eerie and otherworldly." Spin's Chris Martins praised the song and the music video, "S/he is an incredibly able shapeshifter, able to project masculine gangsta hardness and beguiling femininity from one verse to the next, and sometimes between mere bars."

== Track listing ==
No.	Title	Producer(s)	Length
1.	"....."		0:13
2.	"Haze.Boogie.Life"	Matrixxman, Sinden	3:07
3.	"Kingpinning (Ice Cold)"	Brenmar	3:27
4.	"Fuckin' the DJ" (featuring Le1f)	Boody, Le1f	3:11
5.	"Riot"	Gobby	5:10
6.	"Wavvy"	Brenmar	3:55
7.	"Virginia Beach"	Nightfeelings	3:57
8.	"YungRhymeAssassin"	Flosstradamus	5:51
9.	"Squanto"	Gatekeeper	3:50
10.	"....."		0:06
11.	"Betty Rubble"	Gobby	4:52
12.	"MB's First Freestyle"		1:41
13.	"TeenageDream"		1:38
14.	"....."		0:17
15.	"Mendocino California"		3:36
