= King Night =

Studio album by Salem
- Released: September 28, 2010
- Genre: Witch house
- Length: 44:30
- Label: Iamsound
- Producer: John Holland; Jack Donoghue; Heather Marlatt

Salem chronology
Water (2008)	King Night (2010)	I'm Still in the Night (2011)

Singles from King Night
- 1. "Frost" Released: October 19, 2009; 2. "Asia" Released: August 12, 2010; 3. "Sick" Released: April 2011

King Night is the debut album by the American electronic music group Salem. The album was released on September 28, 2010, on IAMSOUND Records. The vinyl and European versions of King Night were released on October 12, 2010. It was mixed by Dave Sardy and includes six brand new songs, along with re-recordings of five previously released songs.

On Insound, the album's first single, "Asia", was included free with the pre-order of the album. The single came in 7" vinyl with a remastered version of the previously released song "Dirt" as the B-side.

King Night was generally well received by music critics. The album charted at number 22 on the US Billboard Heatseekers Albums chart.

== In popular culture ==
"Trapdoor" was featured in the 2012 film The Place Beyond the Pines directed by Derek Cianfrance.

"King Night" was featured in the 2015 film Love directed by Gaspar Noé.

== Accolades ==
Professional ratings
Aggregate scores
Source	Rating
AnyDecentMusic?	6.7/10
Metacritic	72/100
Review scores
Source	Rating
AllMusic	4/5 stars
The A.V. Club	C
The Boston Phoenix	3/4 stars
Fact	4.5/5
NME	9/10
Pitchfork	7.5/10
Q	4/5 stars
Rolling Stone	3/5 stars
Spin	4/10
Uncut	4/5 stars

Publication	Accolade	Year	Rank
NME	NME's Best Albums of 2010	2010	#8
Stereogum	Stereogum's Top 50 Albums of 2010	2010	#23
DIY	DIY's 50 Albums of the Year 2010	2010	#26
The Quietus	Quietus Albums Of The Year 2010	2010	#2

== Track listing ==
No.	Title	Length
1.	"King Night"	3:49
2.	"Asia"	3:38
3.	"Frost"	3:29
4.	"Sick"	3:24
5.	"Release da Boar"	5:01
6.	"Trapdoor"	4:40
7.	"Redlights"	3:43
8.	"Hound"	4:38
9.	"Traxx"	4:51
10.	"Tair"	2:14
11.	"Killer"	4:53
12.	"Water" (iTunes Store bonus track)	2:54
13.	"Finna" (Amazon bonus track)	3:44

== Charts ==
Chart (2010)	Peak position
US Heatseekers Albums (Billboard)	22
