= Mykki =

Studio album by Mykki Blanco
- Released: September 16, 2016
- Genre: Hip-hop
- Length: 36:58
- Label: Dogfood Music Group; Studio !K7
- Producer: Woodkid; Jeremiah Meece

Mykki Blanco chronology
Gay Dog Food (2014)	Mykki (2016)	Broken Hearts and Beauty Sleep (2021)

Singles from Mykki
- 1. "High School Never Ends" Released: May 17, 2016; 2. "The Plug Won't" Released: July 20, 2016; 3. "Loner" Released: September 6, 2016

Mykki is the first studio album by American rapper Mykki Blanco. It was released via Dogfood Music Group and Studio !K7 on September 16, 2016. The production is handled by Woodkid and Jeremiah Meece. Music videos were created for "High School Never Ends" and "Loner".

== Critical reception ==
Professional ratings
Aggregate scores
Source	Rating
Metacritic	77/100
Review scores
Source	Rating
The Guardian	4/5 stars
Now	4/5 stars
The Observer	4/5 stars
Pitchfork	7.7/10
Slant Magazine	4.5/5 stars
Tiny Mix Tapes	3.5/5 marks

At Metacritic, which assigns a weighted average score out of 100 to reviews from mainstream critics, Mykki received an average score of 77, based on 14 reviews, indicating "generally favorable reviews".

Stacey Anderson of Pitchfork gave the album a 7.7 out of 10 and stated that "Mykki's whirlwind of topics have a heated musicality to match, jostling backpack rap with spongy neo-soul, usually with a chant-along pop chorus twining it all together." Benjamin Aspray of Slant Magazine gave the album 4.5 stars out of 5, writing, "Mykki is abundantly entertaining—a seedy, playful camp melodrama produced and performed with the unblinking conviction of an overdue star." Benjamin Boles of Now gave the album 4 stars out of 5, describing it as "an outsider rap album that hits hard enough to cross over to a much bigger audience than many would have predicted."

MusicOMH placed it at number 30 on the "Top 50 Albums of 2016" list.

== Track listing ==
All tracks are written by Mykki Blanco, except where noted.

No.	Title	Writer(s)	Producer(s)	Length
1.	"I'm in a Mood"		Jeremiah Meece	3:46
2.	"Loner" (featuring Jean Deaux)		Jeremiah Meece	3:28
3.	"High School Never Ends"	Blanco; Woodkid	Woodkid	5:33
4.	"Interlude 1"		Jeremiah Meece	0:59
5.	"My Nene"	Blanco; Woodkid	Woodkid	3:22
6.	"The Plug Won't"		Jeremiah Meece	3:40
7.	"Hideaway" (featuring Jeremiah Meece)		Jeremiah Meece	2:55
8.	"Interlude 2"		Jeremiah Meece	1:06
9.	"You Don't Know Me"	Blanco; Woodkid	Woodkid	2:40
10.	"Fendi Band"		Jeremiah Meece	3:18
11.	"For the Cunts"	Blanco; Woodkid	Woodkid	2:17
12.	"Shit Talking Creep"		Jeremiah Meece	1:31
13.	"Rock n Roll Dough"		Jeremiah Meece	2:44
Total length:				36:58

== Personnel ==
Credits adapted from liner notes.

- Mykki Blanco – vocals
- Jean Deaux – vocals (2)
- Jeremiah Meece – vocals (7), production (1, 2, 4, 6–8, 10, 12, 13)
- Woodkid – production (3, 5, 9, 11)
- Bruno Bertoli – arrangement (3, 5, 9, 11)
- Matt Lambert – photography
