= Rapprocher =

Studio album by Class Actress
- Released: October 18, 2011
- Genre: Synth-pop
- Length: 43:31
- Label: Carpark Records
- Producer: Mark Richardson

Class Actress chronology
Journal of Ardency (2010)	Rapprocher (2011)	Movies (2015)

Professional ratings
Aggregate scores
Source	Rating
Metacritic	69/100
Review scores
Source	Rating
AllMusic	4/5 stars
Drowned in Sound	8/10
MusicOMH	favorable
NME	3/5 stars
Paste	8.2/10
The Phoenix	3.5/4 stars
Pitchfork	7.1/10
Resident Advisor	3.0/5
Slant Magazine	3/5 stars
Spin	favorable

Rapprocher is the debut studio album by Class Actress. It was released via Carpark Records on October 18, 2011. It is a follow-up to the 2010 EP, Journal of Ardency. The title is French for "to come closer". Music videos were created for "Weekend", "Bienvenue", and "Need to Know".

== Critical reception ==
At Metacritic, which assigns a weighted average score out of 100 to reviews from mainstream critics, Rapprocher received an average score of 69% based on 16 reviews, indicating "generally favorable reviews".

Larry Fitzmaurice of Pitchfork gave the album a 7.1 out of 10 and wrote, "The synth work on Rapprocher is particularly impressive, maintaining a tangy sharpness while a pop sweetness flows from every corner." Noel Gardner of Drowned in Sound gave the album an 8 out of 10, calling it "a fantastically arranged and conceptually exquisite record".

AllMusic named it as one of the "Favorite Albums of 2011", while NME named it as one of the "Most Underrated Albums of 2011". Allan Raible of ABC News placed it at number 28 on the "50 Best Albums of 2011" list.

== Track listing ==
No.	Title	Length
1.	"Keep You"	3:14
2.	"Love Me Like You Used To"	3:52
3.	"Weekend"	4:02
4.	"Prove Me Wrong"	3:52
5.	"Need to Know"	4:13
6.	"Limousine"	4:26
7.	"All the Saints"	4:24
8.	"Bienvenue"	2:58
9.	"Missed"	4:23
10.	"Hangin' On"	3:16
11.	"Let Me In"	4:54

== Charts ==
Chart	Peak position
US Top Dance/Electronic Albums (Billboard)	21
US Heatseekers Albums (Billboard)	27
