= Dark York =

Mixtape by Le1f
- Released: April 9, 2012
- Genre: Hip-hop
- Length: 66:07
- Labels: Greedhead; Camp & Street
- Producers: Le1f; Boody; Tom Richman; Cybergiga; Nguzunguzu; Morris; 5kinandbone5; Matt Shadetek

Le1f chronology
Dark York (2012)	Liquid (2012)

Dark York is the first mixtape by American rapper and producer Le1f. It was released on Greedhead Music and Camp & Street on April 9, 2012.

== Critical reception ==
Professional ratings
Review scores
Source	Rating
Fact	3.5/5 stars
Pitchfork	7.4/10
Vice	A+

Alex Macpherson of Fact called the mixtape "a murky, often demanding and mostly enthralling listen full of lyrical and sonic twists that wears its radical nature lightly." He added, "Ultimately, Dark York feels like a gauntlet thrown down to the straight hip-hop world, not an inward-looking one-off." Hard Ashurst of Pitchfork praised the mixtape's music and stated that "Le1f matches the forward-thinking production punch for punch, coming across as a compelling and provocative rapper at every turn." Duncan Cooper of The Fader described the mixtape as "one of the most provocative rap releases so far this year, a major work that constantly and subversively carves a distinct space for itself without stepping outside of the feel of popular hip-hop."

=== Accolades ===
Publication	Accolade	Rank	Ref.
Fact	50 Best Albums of 2012	37	
Forbes	Best Free Albums of 2012	19	

== Track listing ==
No.	Title	Producer(s)	Length
1.	"ΩΩΩ"	Le1f	3:28
2.	"Mind Body"	Boody	3:48
3.	"&Gomorrah"	Tom Richman	3:12
4.	"My Oozy"	Cybergiga	4:18
5.	"Bubbles"	Nguzunguzu	2:42
6.	"Snacks"	Le1f	2:42
7.	"Go In"	Morris	3:47
8.	"Wut"	5kinandbone5	2:47
9.	"Yup"	Le1f	2:47
10.	"Fresh"	Le1f	4:03
11.	"☼‿☼"	Le1f	2:41
12.	"Gag"	Le1f	1:16
13.	"Gimme Life"	Nguzunguzu	3:01
14.	"Hate2Wait"	Nguzunguzu	2:09
15.	"Lavandin"	Morris	3:19
16.	"Emulator"	Boody	3:33
17.	"Fry Dem"	Le1f	2:10
18.	"Gayngsta" (featuring Don Jones)	Le1f	2:30
19.	"Giddy Up"	Matt Shadetek	3:49
20.	"Infinity"	Le1f	4:06
21.	"Uptown"	Le1f	4:06
Total length:			66:07
