= Gay Dog Food =

Mixtape by Mykki Blanco
- Released: October 28, 2014
- Length: 57:18
- Label: UNO, Ormolycka

Mykki Blanco chronology
Betty Rubble: The Initiation (2013)	Gay Dog Food (2014)	Mykki (2016)

Gay Dog Food is a 2014 mixtape by American rapper Mykki Blanco. It features contributions from Cakes da Killa, Cities Aviv, and Kathleen Hanna, among others.

== Critical reception ==
Professional ratings
Review scores
Source	Rating
Now	(NNN)
Pitchfork	6/10
PopMatters	3/10
South China Morning Post	3.5/5 stars
Tiny Mix Tapes	2/5 stars

On October 29, 2014, Stereogum named Gay Dog Food the "Mixtape of the Week". MTV News named it one of the "23 Albums That Should Have Gone Platinum in 2014".

== Track listing ==
No.	Title	Length
1.	"Runny Mascara"	1:59
2.	"New Feelings"	2:47
3.	"For the Homey's"	2:47
4.	"Baby's Got Big Plans"	3:49
5.	"Self Destruction"	2:22
6.	"Fulani" (featuring Ian Isiah)	3:25
7.	"A Minute with Cakes" (featuring Cakes da Killa)	2:25
8.	"Moshin in the Front" (featuring Cities Aviv)	3:39
9.	"Something Special" (featuring James K)	1:39
10.	"A Moment with Kathleen" (featuring Kathleen Hanna)	3:06
11.	"Cyber Dog"	5:16
12.	"Lukas" (featuring No Bra)	2:38
13.	"GDF Interlude"	8:12
