= OOoOO =

American witch house project

oOoOO
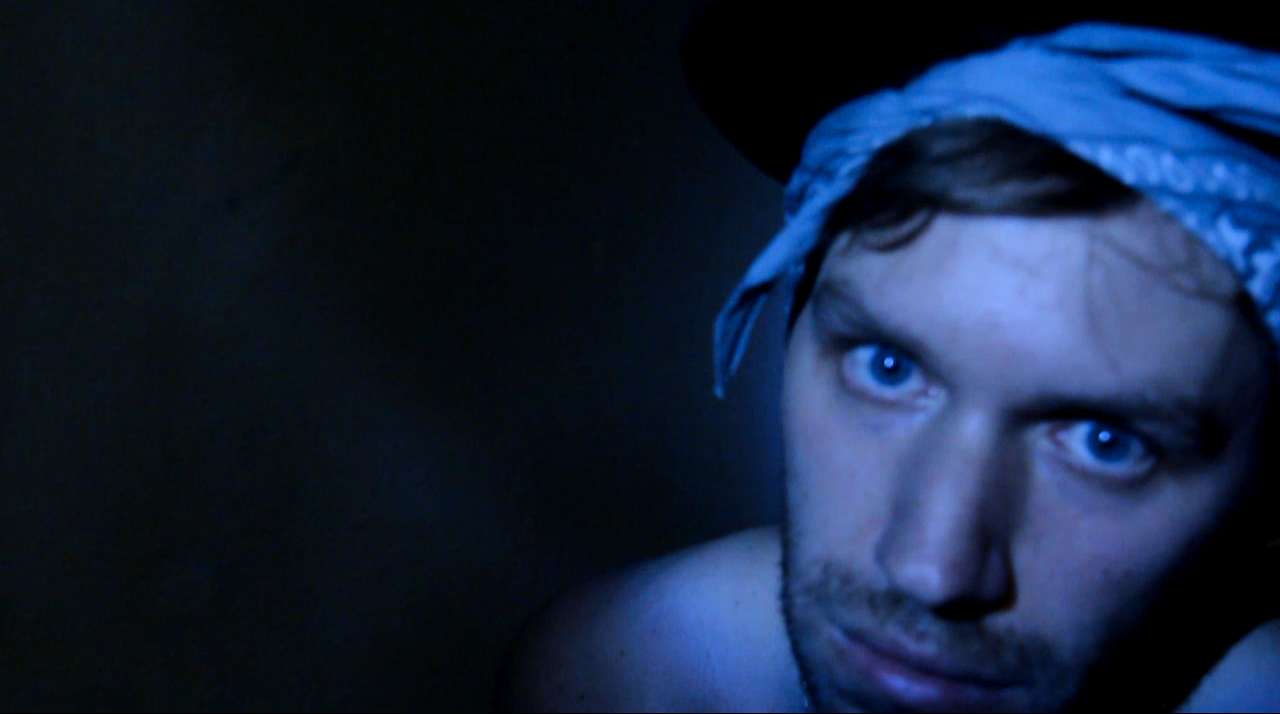
- oOoOO 2012

Background information
- Origin: San Francisco, California
- Genres: Witch house; chillwave
- Years active: 2008–present
- Labels: Disaro; Emotion; Tri Angle; Nihjgt Feelings; Bella Union
- Members: Christopher Dexter Greenspan

oOoOO (pronounced "oh") is an American witch house/chillwave project led by Christopher Dexter Greenspan. The project was founded in 2008. Along with White Ring and Salem, oOoOO is often recognized as a pioneer of the witch house sound.

== Career ==
oOoOO's debut release was on Houston-based Disaro Records in January 2010, where he released a six-track CD-Rk. In 2010, the tracks "No Shore" and "Cold" were included on the 4-artist compilation cassette for Bathetic Records.

oOoOO's second EP Our Loving Is Hurting Us was released on April 10, 2012 via Tri Angle. oOoOO's debut LP, Without Your Love, was released on June 24, 2013 via Nihjgt Feelings – a new label based in Turkey, co-founded by Dexter himself. oOoOO's second LP, Faminine Mystique, was released in 2018 in collaboration with Bosnian-German singer/producer Asia a/k/a Islamiq Grrrls. In 2020, Dexter and Islamiq Grrrls released their first LP under the name Drab City, Good Songs for Bad People.

Chris Dexter has listed Jana Hunter and Matteah Baim as influences.

== Discography ==
=== Studio albums ===
- Without Your Love (Nihjgt Feelings, 2013)
- Faminine Mystique (with Islamiq Grrrls; Nihjgt Feelings, 2018)

=== EPs ===
- Untitled CD-R (Disaro, 2010)
- oOoOO (Tri Angle, 2010)
- Our Loving Is Hurting Us (Tri Angle, 2012)

=== Singles ===
- "Roses" / "Seaww" (split 7" with White Ring; Emotion, 2010)
- "Working for the Men" (with Drab City; Bella Union, 2020)
- "Gone Fishin'" (2022)
