= Tree House (Le1f mixtape) =

Mixtape by Le1f
- Released: September 18, 2013
- Genre: Hip-hop
- Length: 50:18
- Labels: Camp & Street
- Producers: The Drum; Shy Guy; Boody; Rick Rab; FaltyDL; Cybergiga; Potionz; DE; Eyedress; Aeirs TV

Le1f chronology
Fly Zone (2013)	Tree House (2013)	Hey (2014)

Tree House is the third mixtape by American rapper and producer Le1f. It was released on Camp & Street on September 18, 2013.

== Critical reception ==
Professional ratings
Review scores
Source	Rating
The 405	8.5/10
MTV	favorable
Pitchfork	7.7/10
Tiny Mix Tapes	4/5 stars

Robert Whitfield of The 405 said, "On Tree House, and Le1f's other releases, he's consistently shown himself to be ahead of the rest of the rap scene musically and lyrically." Sean Delanty of Tiny Mix Tapes called the mixtape "an undeniably impressive statement by an increasingly vital voice in the independent hip-hop world."

=== Accolades ===
Publication	Accolade	Rank	Ref.
Stereogum	40 Best Rap Albums of 2013	35	
Tiny Mix Tapes	Favorite 30 Album Covers of 2013	7	

== Track listing ==
No.	Title	Producer(s)	Length
1.	"Plush"	The Drum	3:08
2.	"Cane Sugar"	Shy Guy	3:10
3.	"Hush Bb"	Boody	3:31
4.	"Damn Son"	Shy Guy	3:43
5.	"Swerve"	The Drum	3:12
6.	"Blood Oranges" (featuring Ian Isiah and Juliana Huxtable)	Rick Rab	3:54
7.	"Hibiscus"	Boody	2:55
8.	"Jack"	FaltyDL	4:00
9.	"Free Kiki"	Cybergiga	3:25
10.	"Oils" (featuring Junglepussy)	Potionz	4:02
11.	"Shake Bb"	DE	2:31
12.	"Kadabra / Anubish"	DE	2:35
13.	"Star Me" (featuring Lofty305, DonChristian, Jody, and Rahel)	Eyedress	5:19
14.	"Cry Bb"	Aeirs TV	3:53
Total length:			50:18
