= Ritualz =

Mexican musician

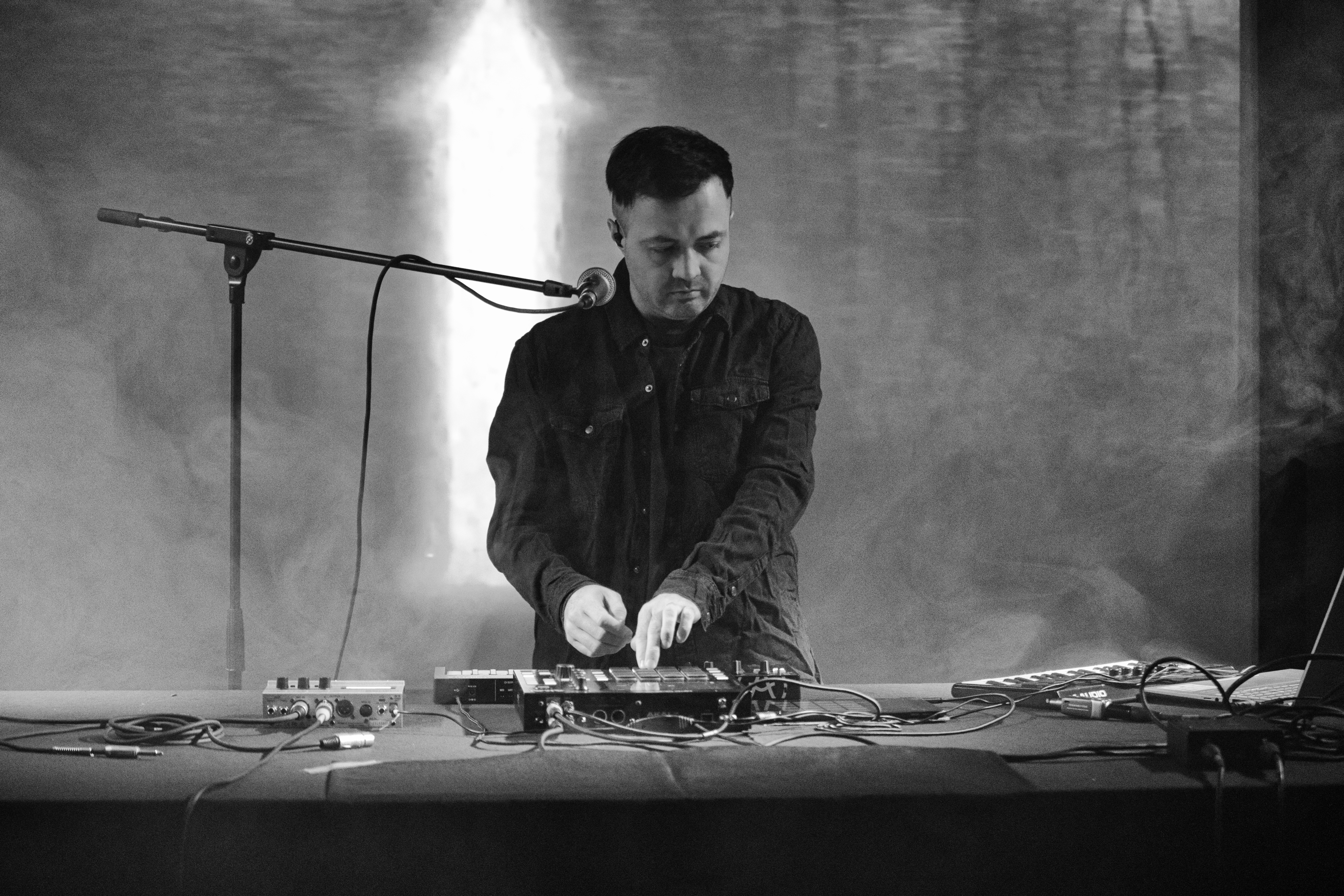
- Ritualz performing in 2024 at Club W71, Weikersheim

Background information
- Born: 18 March 1985 (age 41)
- Origin: Mexico City, Mexico
- Genres: Darkwave; dark ambient; industrial; witch house (early)
- Years active: 2010–present
- Labels: Artoffact; Disaro; Robot Elephant; Maligna
- Website: www.ritualz.com

Juan Carlos "JC" Lobo Garcia, known professionally as Ritualz, (and recognised by the symbol †‡†) is a Mexican electronic musician based in Mexico City. The music of Ritualz is essentially a dark electronic music project, initially associated with the witch house genre and has since incorporated a darkwave and industrial-inspired sound. Ritualz's latest album, RADICAL MACABRO, was released in 2022 and marked a shift towards a heavier, more aggressive sound while retaining some sonic elements and atmosphere from his early releases. Lobo began producing music in the early 2000s. Currently he manages an independent record label called "Maligna".

== Discography ==
=== Albums ===
- Doom (2018, Artoffact Records)
- Radical Macabro (2022, Maligna)

=== Live Albums ===
- Häxan (2020, Maligna)
- En vivo desde el más allá (2020, Maligna)

=== Compilations ===
- Outworld Music (2014, Maligna)
- Gloom (2020, Maligna)
- Rare Trax I+II (2021, Maligna)
- Hypermotion X 2.0 (2023, Dagger Forest)

=== EPs ===
- Untitled CD-R (2010, Disaro)
- Ghetto Ass Witch (2011, self-released)
- †‡† vs. Fostercare (2011, Robot Elephant Records)
- Hypermotion X (2012, MISHKA NYC)
- Rare Trax (2016, self-released)
- Rare Trax II (2017, self-released)
- Satánico supremo (2019, Artoffact Records)
- Rare Trax III (2020, self-released)

=== Singles ===
- Ghetto Ass Witch Remixes - Volume One (2010, self-released)
- Ghetto Ass Witch Remixes - Volume Two (2010, self-released)
- Ray of Light (2021, self-released)
- Disintegration (2022, Maligna)
- Nadir (2022, Maligna)
- Dose (2022, Maligna)
- Static Noise (2022, Maligna)
- Die Here Now (2022, Maligna)
- Violently Happy (2023, self-released)
