= Pregnant with Success =

Studio album by Junglepussy
- Released: November 17, 2015
- Genre: Hip-hop
- Length: 32:55
- Label: self-released
- Producer: Shy Guy; Cousin Gabriel; Matt Parad; Dubbel Dutch

Junglepussy chronology
Satisfaction Guaranteed (2014)	Pregnant with Success (2015)	JP3 (2018)

Pregnant with Success is the debut studio album by American rapper Junglepussy. It was released on November 17, 2015. It is a follow-up to her 2014 mixtape, Satisfaction Guaranteed. The production was handled by Shy Guy, Cousin Gabriel, Matt Parad, and Dubbel Dutch.

Junglepussy described it as "an ode to my mother, to all mothers, to anyone who's ever planted a seed, to anyone who's ever created something, to anyone who's ever waited patiently for something to come into fruition."

== Critical reception ==
Professional ratings
Review scores
Source	Rating
Pitchfork	7.5/10
Spin	8/10

Anupa Mistry of Pitchfork gave the album a 7.5 out of 10, calling it "another reminder of how humor can bring the audience closer and form an emotional connection." She compared the album to Paul Beatty's 2015 novel The Sellout, saying, "It's as bright as Beatty's novel is dark, but they're both charmingly demented, sharp-witted, and necessary social critiques."

=== Accolades ===
Publication	Accolade	Rank	Ref.
Fact	50 Best Albums of 2015	31	
Impose	Best Albums of 2015	N/A	
Respect	Best Hip Hop Projects of 2015	N/A	
Rolling Stone	40 Best Rap Albums of 2015	37	
Spin	50 Best Hip-Hop Albums of 2015	12	

== Track listing ==
No.	Title	Producer(s)	Length
1.	"Spicy 103 FM"	Shy Guy; Cousin Gabriel	4:31
2.	"Somebody"	Shy Guy; Matt Parad	3:46
3.	"Nothing for Me"	Shy Guy	3:22
4.	"Country Boy"	Shy Guy	2:41
5.	"Pop for You"	Shy Guy	3:12
6.	"Only Way"	Shy Guy; Dubbel Dutch	3:41
7.	"Get It Right"	Shy Guy	1:51
8.	"Get to Steppin'"	Shy Guy	3:27
9.	"'Bout You"	Shy Guy	2:33
10.	"Dear Diary"	Shy Guy	3:46
Total length:			32:55
