= Liquid (EP) =

EP by Le1f & Boody
- Released: November 19, 2012 (digital download, vinyl)
- Genre: Alternative hip-hop
- Length: 22:37
- Label: Boysnoize

Le1f & Boody chronology
Dark York (2012)	Liquid (2012)	Fly Zone (2013)

Professional ratings
Review scores
Source	Rating
Fact Magazine	6/10 stars
Pitchfork	7.1/10

Liquid is a collaborative EP by American rapper/producer Le1f and producer Boody, released on November 19, 2012.

== Track listing ==
Standard edition
No.	Title	Length
1.	"Jellyfish"	2:54
2.	"Buoy"	4:11
3.	"Soda"	2:56
4.	"Sweet Tea"	4:12
5.	"Sweet Tea" (Cedaa remix)	4:55
6.	"Soda" (MikeQ & Dvioli S'vere Daughter's Ha remix)	3:30
Total length:		22:37

12" Vinyl Edition
No.	Title	Length
1.	"Born Underwater"	4:40
2.	"Jellyfish"	2:54
3.	"Buoy"	4:11
4.	"Soda"	2:56
5.	"Sweet Tea"	4:12
6.	"Sweet Tea" (Cedaa remix)	4:55
7.	"Soda" (MikeQ & Dvioli S'vere Daughter's Ha remix)	3:30
Total length:		26:48
