= Betty Rubble: The Initiation =

EP by Mykki Blanco
- Released: May 21, 2013
- Genre: Alternative hip-hop
- Label: UNO
- Producers: A-Trak & Oligee, Matrixxman, Sinden, Supreme Cuts

Mykki Blanco chronology
| Cosmic Angel: The Illuminati Prince/ss (2012) | Betty Rubble: The Initiation (2013) | Gay Dog Food (2014) |

Singles from Betty Rubble: The Initiation
- 1. "Feeling Special" Released: April 22, 2013; 2. "The Initiation" Released: June 5, 2013

Betty Rubble: The Initiation is the second extended play (EP) by American rapper Mykki Blanco, released on May 21, 2013.

== Critical reception ==
Professional ratings
Review scores
| Source | Rating |
|---|---|
| FACT | 4/5 stars |
| Pitchfork | 7.2/10 |
| Spin | favorable |
| Tiny Mix Tapes | 4/5 stars |
| XXL | 3/5 stars |

Chris Kelly, in his review for FACT, commented, "For those that have watched and listened to Mykki Blanco’s hypercharged evolution, Betty Rubble: The Initiation isn’t just a culmination of what she’s done — it’s a sign of what’s to come." XXL wrote, "Blanco’s strength is that he sounds like no one else in rap, and his presentation is still more innovative than ever."

== Promotion ==
"Feeling Special" was released as the first music video from the EP on April 16, 2013. The music video was directed by Danny Sangra and in coordination with District MTV. For "Feeling Special," Sangra drew inspiration from Lauren Bacall and the film noir genre. Consequence of Sound's Michelle Geslani commented, "New York emcee Mykki Blanco remains abrasive as ever. His words, now front-and-center, are on full display and burn like acid, packed with attitude and aggression even as they trickle out and cling closely to the slinky Matrixxman-produced beats."

== Track listing ==
| No. | Title | Length |
|---|---|---|
| 1. | "Angggry Byrdz" | 4:18 |
| 2. | "Crisp Clean" | 3:02 |
| 3. | "Feeling Special" | 3:26 |
| 4. | "Bugged Out" | 4:11 |
| 5. | "The Initiation" | 3:33 |
| 6. | "David Blaine Bitches" | 3:09 |
| 7. | "Ace Bougie Chick" (featuring Ian Isiah) | 3:48 |
| 8. | "Vienna" (Bonus track) | 4:40 |
