= Revanchist (album) =

Studio album by Evian Christ
- Released: 20 October 2023
- Recorded: 2014–2023
- Genre: Trance
- Length: 45:24
- Label: Warp
- Producer: Evian Christ

Evian Christ chronology
Waterfall (2014)	Revanchist (2023)

Revanchist is the debut studio album by English electronic music producer Evian Christ, released on 20 October 2023 through Warp. Evian Christ began working on material for the album in 2014 and had completed a draft version of it by 2020. It includes collaborations with Bladee and Merely, and received positive reviews from critics. The album reached the top 50 of the UK Album Downloads Chart.

== Background ==
Joshua Leary came to prominence as Evian Christ after he was enlisted by Kanye West to help produce "I'm in It" from his 2013 album Yeezus, which was followed by collaborations with rappers Travis Scott and Danny Brown. Leary's debut album following 10 years after this was attributed by The New York Times to Leary having "long chosen the unconventional path" in his career as well as "his desire to step out of the spotlight and refine his craft". Leary stated that he "was suddenly expected to work on No. 1 records" and "didn't have the experience or know-how to follow through on that in a way that [he] felt good about".

Leary worked on files from as far back as 2014 for the album, which he completed a first version of in 2020, but was delayed by the COVID-19 pandemic and sample clearance issues. He wanted to incorporate trance music into the album and his sets as he grew up listening to it and called it a "genre of music that has way more depth to it than even [he has] probably have discovered yet" and also one that "has been lambasted for so long"; a conceptual prelude to the album was the English graphic designer David Rudnick's 2015 speculative art installation and performance The Trance War (1998–Ongoing), which he created for the Institute of Contemporary Arts in collaboration with Leary.

== Critical reception ==
Professional ratings
Review scores
Source	Rating
AllMusic	4/5 stars
MusicOMH	3/5 stars
Pitchfork	7.5/10
The Skinny	5/5 stars

AllMusic's Paul Simpson described it as "a culmination of everything [Evian Christ has] achieved up to this point in his career, as well as a return to his roots". Simpson went on to remark that "Warp never would've touched a trance record during the genre's commercial peak" but attributed its release of the record to the passage of time and "nostalgia also coming into play as a factor". He concluded: "Revanchist is a powerful effort from someone who's embraced this energy his entire life". Joe Creely of The Skinny wrote that the album "follows [the] lead" of Evian Christ's 2020 song "Ultra" and its "blown out, cataclysmic take on the genre [...] into a world of spacious, wounded beauty, run through with pounding ferocity". Creely also commented that "while his drift into trance undoubtedly informs and shapes" the album, "it is not to say that this is by any means a straightforward genre exercise".

Ben Devlin of MusicOMH felt that Revanchist "is preoccupied with contrasting the beautiful and the abrasive" as "dynamic contrasts of this type are peppered throughout the record, and the sound design is sometimes more reminiscent of an exhilarating action movie than club music". Conor McTernan of Resident Advisor found the album to have "a keen balance of excess and restraint", writing that "trance has been back in vogue for several years now, and he wants to take it back and bring it even higher. Leary's precision, strong sound-engineering and stylistic decisions help elevate his work to the peak of the genre". Nadine Smith of Pitchfork stated that the album "proves that the genre's comeback isn't just a phase", describing it as "a ghostly love letter to the pure melodrama and overstimulating sensation of trance music".

== Track listing ==
Revanchist track listing
No.	Title	Length
1.	"On Embers"	5:05
2.	"Yxguden" (featuring Bladee)	4:26
3.	"The Beach"	4:59
4.	"Nobody Else"	6:36
5.	"Silence"	5:01
6.	"Xkyrgios"	6:25
7.	"With Me" (featuring Merely)	7:03
8.	"Run Boys Run"	5:49
Total length:		45:24

== Charts ==
Chart performance for Revanchist
Chart (2023)	Peak position
UK Album Downloads (OCC)	49
