= Evian Christ =

English electronic music producer

- Born: Joshua James Leary; 11 June 1989 (age 37); Ellesmere Port, Cheshire, England
- Genres: Deconstructed club; trance
- Occupations: Record producer; disc jockey; songwriter; performance artist
- Years active: 2008–present
- Labels: Tri Angle; Donda; Very Good Beats; Warp

Joshua James Leary (born 11 June 1989), better known by the stage name Evian Christ, is an English electronic music producer, DJ, songwriter and performance artist from Ellesmere Port, UK. He is signed to Tri Angle, Warp, and Kanye West’s publishing house Donda and record label Very Good Beats. He released his debut mixtape Kings and Them in 2012 and gained prominence as a collaborator on West's 2013 album Yeezus. He released a further EP on Tri Angle, Waterfall, in 2014, and released his debut album on Warp Records, Revanchist, in 2023.

== Life and career ==
Leary grew up in the small town of Ellesmere Port, near Liverpool. He began making music using vintage keyboards belonging to his step-father, who was a trance DJ in the late 1990s. While training to be a teacher at Edge Hill University, Leary produced the eight tracks that would make up his debut mixtape, Kings And Them, which was produced on Cubase and recorded in his garage. In December 2011, he posted three of the tracks on YouTube under the name Evian Christ; they were discovered by Dummy Magazine and other music blogs, which led to a search for his identity. Leary was contacted by Tri Angle Records founder Robin Carolan, who signed him to the label; he then made his live debut at a Tri Angle showcase in London alongside Balam Acab, Romy xx, and The Haxan Cloak. Directly after graduating from his education program, Leary left the UK to tour in America. In July 2012, Tri Angle rereleased Kings And Them as a limited edition 12" EP, raising Leary's reputation.

In 2013, Kanye West reached out to Leary to produce material for his then-upcoming record Yeezus. He was flown out to Paris, where he worked with West's in-house engineers and producers to create the album track "I'm In It". West additionally later signed Evian Christ to his publishing house, Donda. In November of 2013 he hosted the first edition of his now infamous club night: TranceParty. Across two nights at London's Corsica Studios and Manchester's The Basement respectively, Leary hosted artists such as Arca, Lukid and Holy Other. In the same year, Leary also attended the Red Bull Music Academy in New York City.

Leary released his debut EP, Waterfall, in March 2014 on Tri Angle records. To celebrate the release, he collaborated with London promoter Oscillate Wildly to present the second edition of TranceParty at London's Oval Space which featured artists such as Travis Scott, SOPHIE, MssingNo, and Andy Stott among others.

In June 2015, Leary signed with British electronic music label Warp and in July collaborated with artist David Rudnick to create a temporary art installation and performance at London's Institute of Contemporary Arts, titled The Trance War (1998 – Ongoing) which was his first "release" for Warp. In August 2015, Leary pulled out of Reading Festival, saying that he had been unfairly detained by security staff at the Leeds sister festival.

In August 2016, Leary produced "Pneumonia", the second single from rapper Danny Brown's critically acclaimed fourth studio album, Atrocity Exhibition. The single was officially released on August 19 through Warp Records.

In September 2020, Leary released his much awaited debut single for Warp title Ultra. The release was later accompanied in September with a remix from Swedish producer and Drain Gang affiliate Yung Sherman.

In September 2023, Leary announced Revanchist, his debut album for Warp, which was released on 20 October of the same year.

== Discography ==
=== Studio albums ===
- Revanchist (Warp, 2023)

=== Extended plays ===
- Duga-3 (Tri Angle, 2013)
- Waterfall (Tri Angle, 2014)

=== Mixtapes ===
- Kings and Them (Tri Angle, 2012)

== Production discography ==
=== 2013 ===
Kanye West – Yeezus

- 6. "I'm in It" (produced with Kanye West, Dom Solo, Noah Goldstein, Arca, and Mike Dean)

The Alchemist and Oh No – Welcome to Los Santos

- 6. "20's 50's 100's" (King Avriel featuring A$AP Ferg) (produced with Oh No)

=== 2014 ===
Tinashe – Aquarius

- 10. "Indigo Child (Interlude)"

=== 2015 ===
Le1f – Riot Boi

- 6. "Umami/Water" (produced with Lunice, Le1f, Aron, and Boody)
- 3. "Grace Alek Naomi" (produced with Boody)

=== 2016 ===
Travis Scott – Birds in the Trap Sing McKnight

- 1. "The Ends" (produced with Vinylz, Daxz, WondaGurl, OZ)

Danny Brown – Atrocity Exhibition

- 9. "Pneumonia"

=== 2017 ===
Cashmere Cat – 9

- 2. "Europa Pools" (produced with Cashmere Cat)

Yung Sherman – Innocence v2

- 2. "I D C - Evian Christ Remix" (produced with Yung Sherman)

=== 2020 ===
- 1. "Ultra - Evian Christ"
