= White Ring (band) =

American band

- Origin: New York City, U.S.
- Genres: Witch house
- Years active: 2009–present
- Labels: Disaro; Pendu Sound; Rocket Girl; Hi-Scores; Emotion
- Members: Bryan Kurkimilis; Adina Kurkimilis
- Past members: Kendra Malia

White Ring is an American witch house musical group, formed in 2009 in New York City by Bryan Kurkimilis and Kendra Malia.

== History ==
Founding members Bryan Kurkimilis and Kendra Malia met each other through the social networking website MySpace in 2006. Around this time Malia would suggest they should work together on music, and from that point began working together on songs for the next three years. In 2009, Kurkimilis moved from New Orleans to New York to pursue White Ring full-time with Malia. The two were later joined by co-vocalist Adina Viarengo in 2016. The current touring line-up consists of Kurkimilis and Viarengo.

The band's debut release was a split 7-inch single with fellow founding witch house artist oOoOO. The single, titled Roses / Seaww, was released in March 2010. In 2011 they released their debut EP Black Earth That Made Me (Disaro Records) and the DJ mix Chaind Vol. 1 (Pendu Sound Recordings); after that they went on seven year-long hiatus. In July 2018, the band made a comeback and released their debut studio album, Gate of Grief. The album was originally scheduled to be released on June 22, but was eventually delayed and released on July 27. The album was in the works for eight years, but was put off due to Malia's health issues. In 2016 Adina Viarengo joined the group to finish the record and sings on many of the songs, she later went on to work in the group full time.

In late 2019 it was confirmed that Kendra Malia had died on October 25, she was 37 years old.

On May 14, 2019 they released their second free mixtape Chaind Vol. 2 which was made available on streaming services later that month.

The group's debut EP and first two albums form a full trilogy that deals with themes of trauma, loss and acceptance. On 23 February 2024 they announced their third studio album Angel 13 Volume 1 which would begin a follow up trilogy.

== Discography ==
=== Studio albums ===
| Title | Details |
|---|---|
| Gate of Grief | Released: July 27, 2018; Label: Rocket Girl; Formats: CD, LP, digital download |
| Show Me Heaven | Released: February 19, 2021; Label: Rocket Girl; Formats: CD, LP, digital download |
| Angel 13 Volume 1 | Released: March 15, 2024; Label: Rocket Girl; Formats: cassette, digital download |
| Fate | Released: September 11, 2026; Label: Rocket Girl; Formats: cassette, digital download |

=== Extended plays ===
| Title | Details |
|---|---|
| Black Earth That Made Me | Released: November 21, 2011; Label: Rocket Girl; Formats: CD, LP, digital download |

=== Singles ===
| Title | Year | Album | Label |
|---|---|---|---|
| "Roses / Seaww" (with oOoOO) | 2010 | Non-album single | Emotion |
| "Suffocation" | 2010 | Black Earth That Made Me | Hi-Scores |
| "Hey Hey, My My + Felt U" | 2011 | Non-album single | Handmade Birds |
| "Burn It Down" | 2018 | Gate of Grief | Rocket Girl |
| "Leprosy" | 2018 | Gate of Grief | Rocket Girl |
| "Nothing" | 2018 | Gate of Grief | Rocket Girl |
| "Slow Burned" (Side 1: Aessense / Side 2: Shaken to Sleep) | 2019 | Non-album single | Rocket Girl |
