= Mess Kid =

- Born: Artem Emelianov; 1987 (age 38–39)
- Occupation: Producer/DJ

Artem Emelianov (born 1987), better known by his stage name Mess Kid, is a Latvian born producer and DJ raised in Detroit, Michigan. He is a frequent collaborator with the hip hop artist Le1f, and went on tour with him in 2013 after producing the popular track "Psy Lock." He is also involved in the fashion world, working with companies such as Alexander Wang, DKNY, Dior and Balenciaga. Mess Kid is currently based in Los Angeles. His first EP is scheduled for release in 2017.

== Biography ==
Mess Kid was born Artem Emelianov in Riga, Latvia, in 1987. His family moved to Detroit when he was six years old. When he turned 18 he moved to New York City and started DJing at clubs like 1Oak and Beatrice. Since then he has collaborated with Giorgio Moroder, M.I.A, IloveMakonnen, ASAP Ferg and, most notably Le1f, with whom he went on tour in 2013.

The Fader has released several of his original songs and remixes, such as "Assembly Line" and the remix of Niia's "Bored To Death." He was recognized as a "Discovery DJ" by Interview magazine in 2013.

== Style and influences ==
His music takes inspiration from the underground electronic scene and incorporates some of Detroit’s ghetto-tech vibe.
