= Mykki Blanco =

American musical and performance artist and activist

- Born: April 2, 1986 (age 40); Orange County, California
- Education: University of Applied Sciences and Arts Northwestern Switzerland
- Genres: Alternative hip-hop; hip-hop
- Occupation: Rapper
- Instrument: Vocals
- Labels: UNO; Transgressive
- Website: mykkiblan.co

Mykki Blanco (born April 2, 1986) is an American rapper, performance artist, writer, poet and activist. They (Note: See § Personal life.) have collaborated musically with artists including Madonna, Charli XCX, Blood Orange, Michael Stipe, Kanye West, Teyana Taylor, Big Freedia, and Devendra Banhart.

== Early life ==
Blanco was born in Orange County, California. As a child, they lived in San Mateo County, California, near their paternal grandparents, before moving to Raleigh, North Carolina. They attended Enloe High School.

At the age of 15, Blanco won an Indies Spirit Award for the performance collective they founded, Paint In Consciousness Experimental Theater, in Raleigh.

At the age of 16, Blanco ran away from home before moving to New York City. They then spent time in California, before winning a full scholarship to attend the School of the Art Institute of Chicago, but dropped out of college after two semesters in 2006. They also briefly attended Parsons School of Design in New York City. In 2024, Blanco graduated with a master's degree in fine arts from The Art Institut Gender Natur (FHNW) at the University of Applied Sciences and Arts Northwestern Switzerland.

== Career ==
Blanco's book of poetry, From the Silence of Duchamp to the Noise of Boys, was published on OHWOW's imprint on June 17, 2011.

Blanco has contributed essays to several publications, including The Queer Bible and We Can Do Better Than This. They have also written for magazines such as Vogue and Them. In 2018, they served as a guest editor for Dazed magazine.

In 2012, Blanco made their musical debut with an EP, Mykki Blanco & the Mutant Angels.

In November 2012, Blanco released the mixtape Cosmic Angel: The Illuminati Prince/ss. The mixtape was produced by Brenmar, Flosstradamus, Gobby, Le1f, Boody, Matrixxman, and Sinden. They make an appearance in the album Junto by Basement Jaxx.

In 2013, Blanco released their second EP Betty Rubble: The Initiation. May 2014 saw the release of the Spring/Summer 2014 EP, followed by their second mixtape Gay Dog Food in October. Gay Dog Food features a spoken word track with Kathleen Hanna, and contributions from Cities Aviv, Cakes Da Killa, and more.

Blanco's debut album, Mykki, was released on September 16, 2016.

Blanco's ad-libs appeared on Teyana Taylor's song "WTP", from her June 2018 album K.T.S.E.; they also have writing and production credits on the track.

In 2018, Blanco collaborated with Kanye West on the track "Bye Bye Baby" for West's scrapped album Yandhi; the track was later leaked.

Blanco released Broken Hearts & Beauty Sleep through Transgressive Records in June 2021.

== Artistry ==
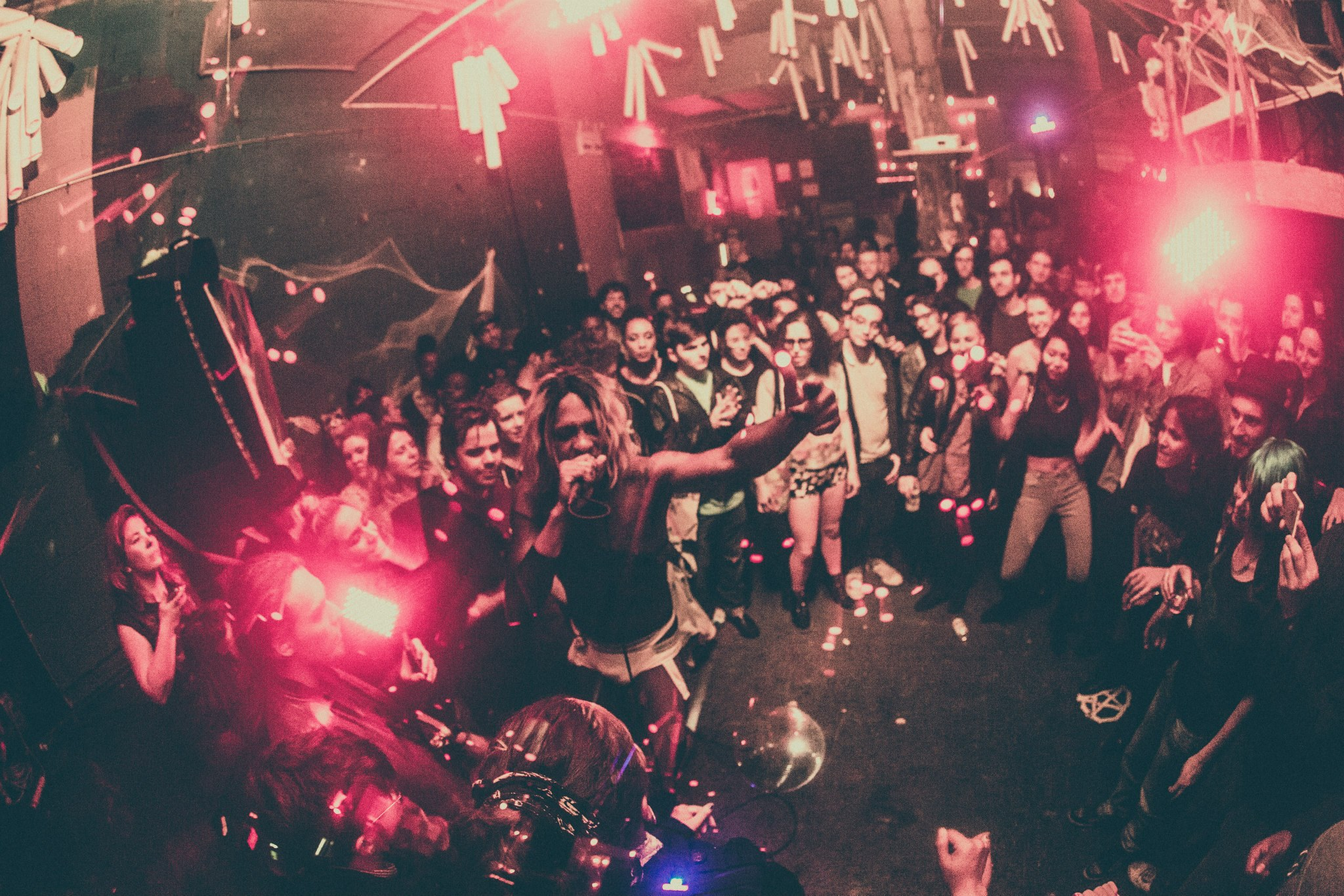
Blanco performing at Glasslands, 2014

The persona Mykki Blanco began as a teenage girl character for a YouTube video in 2010, but evolved into a musical and performance art piece. Blanco's name is inspired by Lil' Kim's alter ego Kimmy Blanco. Their influences include Lil' Kim, GG Allin, Jean Cocteau, Kathleen Hanna, Lauryn Hill, Rihanna, Marilyn Manson, and Anaïs Nin. They are also inspired by the riot grrrl movement and queercore, namely the director Bruce LaBruce and the drag queen Vaginal Davis.

Blanco has been called one of hip-hop's queer pioneers; although they struggled to identify with the label of "gay rap" or "queer rap", they have begrudgingly "accepted it". Blanco also disagrees with those who portray them as a drag artist, saying "You can't tag me as the rapping transvestite. I never vogued in my life. I'm from a punk and Riot Grrrl background." Blanco has often described themself in terms of other artists, saying that they're not a "Marilyn Manson" or even a rapper, but rather says they want to be Yoko Ono. In fact, their album Mykki was originally going to be named Michael in reference to Michael Jackson. Blanco, along with Rosie O'Donnell and Anderson Cooper, presented Madonna with the GLAAD Advocate for Change award on May 5, 2019, in Manhattan.

Blanco has also tried to bring their "persona" closer and closer to their non-artist self, having to repeatedly say through interviews and alike that they are indeed transfeminine, and that the aesthetic evolution of the Mykki Blanco persona over the years is the aesthetic evolution of their entire self, rather than just a "drag performance".

== Personal life ==
In June 2015, Blanco revealed via their Facebook page that they had been HIV-positive since 2011. Blanco initially worried that being HIV positive would be detrimental to their career, saying of the decision to make finally that information public, "I did it for myself. At a certain point, my real life has to be more important than this career".

Blanco is transgender, and has used different gender pronouns throughout their career. As of 2021, Blanco uses they/them pronouns.

== Discography ==
=== Studio albums ===
Title	Album details
Mykki	Released: September 16, 2016; Label: Dogfood Music Group, Studio !K7; Formats: Streaming, digital download
Broken Hearts and Beauty Sleep	Released: June 18, 2021; Label: Transgressive; Formats: Streaming, digital download, CD
Stay Close to Music	Release date: October 14, 2022; Label: Transgressive; Formats: Streaming, digital download, CD
CAFE PARADISO	Release date: September 4, 2026; Label: Transgressive; Formats: Streaming, digital download, CD

=== Extended plays ===
Title	EP details
Mykki Blanco & the Mutant Angels	Released: May 15, 2012; Label: UNO; Formats: Digital download
Betty Rubble: The Initiation	Released: May 21, 2013; Label: UNO; Formats: Digital download
Spring/Summer 2014	Released: June 20, 2014; Label: UNO; Formats: Streaming, digital download
Postcards from Italia	Released: September 22, 2023; Label: Transgressive; Formats: Streaming, digital download

=== Mixtapes ===
Title	Mixtape details
Cosmic Angel: The Illuminati Prince/ss	Released: November 9, 2012; Label: UNO; Formats: Digital download
Gay Dog Food	Released: October 28, 2014; Label: UNO, Ormolycka; Formats: Digital download

=== Singles ===
==== As lead artist ====
Song	Year	Album
"Head Is a Stone"	2012	Mykki Blanco & the Mutant Angels
"Join My Militia"	2012	Mykki Blanco & the Mutant Angels
"Wavvy"	2012	Cosmic Angel: The Illuminati Prince/ss
"Haze.Boogie.Life"	2013	Cosmic Angel: The Illuminati Prince/ss
"Kingpinning (Ice Cold)"	2013	Cosmic Angel: The Illuminati Prince/ss
"Feeling Special"	2013	Betty Rubble: The Initiation
"The Initiation"	2013	Betty Rubble: The Initiation
"She Gutta"	2014	Spring/Summer 2014
"Wish You Would" (featuring Princess Nokia)	2014	Spring/Summer 2014
"Runny Mascara"	2014	Gay Good Food
"New Feelings"	2015	Gay Good Food
"Self Destruction"	2015	Gay Good Food
"High School Never Ends"	2016	Mykki
"The Plug Won't"	2016	Mykki
"Loner" (featuring Jean Deaux)	2016	Mykki
"I'm in a Mood"	2017	Mykki
"You Will Find It" (featuring FaltyDL and Devendra Banhart)	2020	Non-album single
"Free Ride"	2021	Broken Hearts and Beauty Sleep
"Love Me" (featuring Jamila Woods and Jay Cue)	2021	Broken Hearts and Beauty Sleep
"Summer Fling" (featuring Kari Faux)	2021	Broken Hearts and Beauty Sleep
"It's Not My Choice" (featuring Blood Orange)	2021	Broken Hearts and Beauty Sleep
"Family Ties" (featuring Michael Stipe)	2022	Stay Close to Music
"Your Love Was a Gift" (with Diana Gordon and Sam Buck)	2022	Stay Close to Music
"French Lessons" (with Kelsey Lu)	2022	Stay Close to Music
"Steps" (with Saul Williams and MNEK)	2022	Stay Close to Music
"Pink Diamond Bezel"	2022	Stay Close to Music
"Holidays In The Sun"	2023	Postcards from Italia
"Butt Sex"	2026	Cafe Paradiso

==== As a featured artist ====
Title	Year	Other artist(s)	Album
"Ring Around The Moon"	2013	Sinden	Ring Around The Moon
"Unclassified"	2014	Etnik	Unclassified EP
"Buffalo"	2014	Basement Jaxx	Junto
"Femmebot"	2017	Charli XCX, Dorian Electra	Pop 2
"WTP"	2018	Teyana Taylor	K.T.S.E.
"My Sex"	2018	Brooke Candy, Pussy Riot, MNDR	Non-album single
"Play"	2019	J-E-T-S, Machinedrum, Jimmy Edgar	ZOOSPA
"Collide"	2020	Shea Couleé, GESS	Non-album single

=== Music videos ===
Song	Year	Director
"Join My Militia"	2012	Mitch Moore
"Head Is a Stone"	2012	Nick Hooker
"Wavvy"	2012	Francesco Carrozzini
"Haze.Boogie.Life"	2012	Danny Sangra
"Kingpinning"	2013	Clarence Fuller
"Feeling Special"	2013	Danny Sangra
"The Initiation"	2013	Ninian Doff
"She Gutta"	2014	Jude MC
"High School Never Ends" (feat. Woodkid)	2016	Matt Lambert
"My Sex" (Brooke Candy feat. Pussy Riot, MNDR and Mykki Blanco)	2018	Pastelae

== Bibliography ==
- From the Silence of Duchamp to the Noise of Boys (2011)

== See also ==
- LGBT culture in New York City
- List of LGBT people from New York City
- NYC Pride March
