= Balam Acab =

American electronic musician

- Born: Alec Jeffery Koone; April 14, 1991 (age 35)
- Origin: Mechanicsburg, Pennsylvania, U.S.
- Genres: Electronic; witch house
- Years active: 2010–present
- Labels: Tri Angle; Orchid Tapes

Alec Jeffery Koone (born April 14, 1991), better known by his former stage name Balam Acab, is an American electronic musician and producer originally from Mechanicsburg, Pennsylvania.

== Biography ==
Koone began creating hardcore and metal at the age of 13 with a group of musician friends. While studying music at Ithaca College in Ithaca, New York in 2009, he began to experiment with post-rock and ambient music. He eventually dropped out of Ithaca College to focus on his music career.

His first release, the 2010 EP See Birds, got him categorized as witch house according to Pitchfork. He followed that up with his first full-length album, Wander/Wonder, in 2011. Wander/Wonder was recorded entirely in the same bedroom he slept in as a child and heavily incorporated Creative Commons-licensed nature recordings he found on the Internet. His song "See Birds", title track of the See Birds EP, was featured in a L'Oréal mascara ad starring Beyoncé in early 2011.

After a long hiatus, Balam Acab self-released his second official album, Child Death, on December 17, 2015 via Bandcamp. In April 2016, the album was pressed on vinyl and released by the DIY record label Orchid Tapes. Since the release of Child Death, Balam Acab has released many singles and collaborations in a variety of styles through SoundCloud and Bandcamp.

Among numerous side projects and aliases, Balam Acab recently teamed up with producer Goodbye to form the duo hospice_dreams, releasing the debut demo "because i am true". A full release was expected to be released late 2018.

The name "Balam Acab" was taken from a rainbow-creating deity in Maya mythology that Koone learned about in Spanish class.

== Discography ==
=== Studio albums ===
- Wander/Wonder (2011)
- Child Death (2015)

=== EPs ===
- See Birds (2010)
- See Birds Era (2016)
- All I Beg (2017)
- Watertree Edits (2017)
- Rituals (2017)
- Noided In Flint, MI (2018)
