= Salem (American band) =

American witch house music group

- Origin: Traverse City, Michigan, U.S.
- Genres: Witch house; electronic rock
- Years active: 2006–2012; 2016; 2020–present
- Labels: Acéphale; Audraglint; Big Love; Merok; Iamsound; Mad Decent
- Members: Jack Donoghue; John Holland
- Past members: Heather Marlatt
- Website: www.s4lem.com

Salem (sometimes stylized as S4LEM or SALEM) is an American electronic music band from Traverse City, Michigan. It was founded by Heather Marlatt, Jack Donoghue and John Holland. Salem is considered one of the pioneers of the witch house genre.

Salem released its debut album King Night in 2010. In 2020, the group released a mixtape, Stay Down, followed by their second album, Fires in Heaven, both without Marlatt, who is disputing her ouster.

== History ==
While John Holland was living in Chicago, he met Jack Donoghue. Salem officially formed in 2006 after he simultaneously struck up a friendship with Donoghue and his friend since his time in school, Heather Marlatt, ended up moving in with him. The trio began working on music in Holland's home studio. The band's first two releases are the EP's Yes I Smoke Crack and Water, both released in 2008.

Salem released the debut studio album, King Night, in 2010. It was included on the year-end lists by AllMusic, DIY, NME, The Quietus, and Stereogum. The band's infamous March 18, 2010, performance at South by Southwest at the Fader Fort received widespread negative reviews from music critics and saw the band booed off the stage. In 2020, Steven Hyden wrote for Uproxx that it was "one of the worst and least competent musical performances by a supposedly professional act to happen in the early 21st century."

Salem had been inactive since 2012, with no new releases since their 2011 EP I'm Still in the Night. In 2016, a new Salem album was announced by photographer Wolfgang Tillmans, who confirmed the news on his Instagram account. In that year, Salem officially returned with a remix of Tillmans' song "Make It Up as You Go Along", which was included on his Device Control EP. However, the band was not fully revived until May 2020 where Salem premiered a new mixtape titled Stay Down, which was presented on NTS Radio. This reboot of the band happened without member Heather Marlatt, who gave a negative public comment about the situation stating she was kicked out.

Salem released their first single in nearly a decade "Starfall" on September 18, 2020, via Mad Decent's Decent Distribution. The music video follows the band's trip with veteran storm trackers through Tulsa, Oklahoma and Dallas as well as through Texas during tornado season. It was directed by Donoghue and Holland along Tommy Malekoff. In a press release, it was stated that the song was "a signal of additional work to come". On October 16, a new single called "Red River" was unveiled alongside the pre-order availability of the new album. Their second album, Fires in Heaven, was released on October 30, 2020, ten years after their debut.

On November 10, 2022, Salem performed a surprise DJ set for the opening party of clothing brand Supreme's flagship store in Chicago, Illinois, marking the band's first performance in over 10 years. On July 28, 2023, Salem performed their first solo live set in 12 years. The show took place at El Dorado Bumper Cars in Coney Island, New York City, tickets for which sold out within minutes after going live online.

On June 7, 2025, Salem performed at the Primavera Sound festival in Barcelona, Spain.

On May 14, 2026, Salem released a second collection with Supreme. The band surprise released a compilation album titled Red Dragon on the same day, consisting of B-sides and unreleased material spanning since the group's early days alongside four new tracks.

On August 23rd, 2026, Salem played a live show in London, as part of Outbreak Festival, This was the first time Salem has played in the UK in 16 years.

== Style and influences ==
According to Heather Phares of AllMusic, Salem's sound blends ethereal electronica and slow Southern hip hop rhythms, and is noted for pioneering the music subgenre known as witch house.

== Band members ==
Current

- Jack Donoghue – drum machine, rapping vocals, occasional guitar (2006–present)
- John Holland – keyboards, guitar, vocals (2006–present)

Former

- Heather Marlatt – vocals, keyboards (2006–2020)

== Discography ==
=== Studio albums ===
- King Night (2010)
- Fires in Heaven (2020)

=== EPs ===
- Yes I Smoke Crack (2008)
- Water (2008)
- I'm Still in the Night (2011)

=== Compilations ===
- Red Dragon (2026)

=== DJ mix releases ===
- XXJFG (2009)
- We Make It Good (2009)
- Raver Stay Wif Me (2010)
- I Buried My Heart Inna Wounded Knee (2010)
- Sleep Now My One Little Eye (2010)
- 5Min2Live: Gurn Baby Gurn (2010)
- Bow Down (2011)
- On Again / Off Again (2011)
- Mother Always (2011)
- Stay Down (2020)

=== Singles ===
- "OhK" (2009)
- "Babydaddy" / "S.A.W." (2009) (split with Tanlines)
- "Frost" / "Legend" (2009)
- "Asia" (2010)
- "Starfall" (2020)
- "Red River" (2020)
- Shlohmo – "Chore Boy" (feat. SALEM) (2025) (feature)

=== Remixes ===
- Gucci Mane – "Bird Flu (Salem Remix)" (2009)
- Gucci Mane – "Round One (Salem Remix)" (2009)
- Playboy Tre – "Sideways (Salem Drag Chop Remix) from ATL RMX (2009)
- Gucci Mane – "My Shadow (Salem Remix)" (2010)
- Health – "In Violet (Salem RMX)" from Health::Disco2 (2010)
- HIM – "In the Arms of Rain (Salem Remix)" from SWRMXS (2010)
- These New Puritans – "Hologram (Salem Remix)" from Hidden Remixes (2010)
- Blonde Redhead – "Penny Sparkle (Salem Remix)" (2011)
- Britney Spears – "Till the World Ends (Salem Remix)" (2011)
- Charli XCX – "Stay Away (Salem's Angel Remix)" (2011)
- Interpol – "Try It On (Salem RMX)" (2011)
- Light Asylum – "Shallow Tears (Like a Storm) (Salem Remix)" (2011)
- The Cult – "Elemental Light (Salem Remix)" (2012)
- Wolfgang Tillmans – "Make It Up as You Go Along (Salem Remix)" from Device Control (2016)
- Bladee & Mechatok - "Grace (Salem Remix)" (2021)

=== Productions ===
- Lil B – "Slangin Yayo" from Red Flame: Evil Edition (2010)
- Kanye West — "Black Skinhead" from Yeezus (2013)
- Yung Lean – "All the things" from Stardust (2022)
