= Witch house =

Electronic music genre and visual aesthetic

- Sample of a typical witch house beat
- Other names: Drag; screwgaze; haunted house; crunk shoegaze
- Stylistic origins: Trap; chopped and screwed; noise; drone; ambient house; Houston hip-hop; shoegaze; industrial; gothic rock
- Cultural origins: c. 2006–2007, New Orleans and New York City
- Typical instruments: Synthesizer; drum machine; sequencer; sampler
- Derivative forms: Maidcore

Other topics
- Vaporwave; phonk; wave; bass music

Witch house (also known as drag, screwgaze and haunted house) is a microgenre of electronic music that is musically characterized by high-pitched keyboard effects, heavily layered basslines and trap-style drum loops. Aesthetically, it employs occult- and gothic-inspired themes.

== Characteristics ==
Witch house is characterized by the use of hip-hop drum machines, noise atmospherics, creepy samples, dark synthpop-influenced lead melodies, dense reverb, and heavily altered, distorted, and sometimes pitched down & reverse vocals, which are either rapped or sung. Influences range from electronic-based genres like ambient house and synth-pop, to alternative music genres such as shoegaze, industrial, ethereal wave, and gothic rock. Other influences include noise and drone. Alongside, the Houston hip-hop scene, particularly rapper and producer DJ Screw, whose pioneering sampling technique known as "chopped and screwed" is regarded as a foundational influence. Witch house’s sonic and aesthetic features are often grisly, nihilistic, and dystopic in nature.

== Visual aesthetics and typography ==
Witch house's visual aesthetic draws influence from occultism, witchcraft, shamanism, horror-inspired artworks, collages and photographs, as well as the use of hidden messages.

The easiest way I can find to describe witch house comes from this scene that takes place early in the movie Blade (you know, the one with the vampires), where there are a bunch of vampires in a club among humans. Suddenly, in the middle of the dancing, the film slows down and blood spurts from the ceiling, much to the delight of the vampires and the horror of the humans. Like a heavy, pulsing blood-beat - Nurgul Jones

Example of a witch house track (FixMyBrain – Shadowed Enchantments)

Artworks by witch house visual artists have incorporated imagery from horror films such as The Blair Witch Project, the television series Twin Peaks, and the fantasy show Charmed, as well as mainstream pop culture celebrities of the 2000s.

A defining feature of the microgenre is its typography. Common typographic elements in titles, such as by Salem and White Ring, include triangles, crosses, and Unicode symbols. The practice was developed intentionally as a gatekeeping mechanism to keep the scene underground and harder to search for online.

Other notable acts include Mater Suspiria Vision, oOoOO, Crim3s, Balam Acab & Ritualz.

== History and etymology ==
=== 2000s–2010s: Origins ===
In the late 2000s, witch house's stylistic sound and aesthetic was pioneered by Salem, who formed in 2006, in Traverse City, Michigan. The term "witch house" was later coined in December 2009 as a joke by Travis Egedy, professionally known as Pictureplane, as Egedy explained:

Myself and my friend Shams... were joking about the sort of house music we make, [calling it] witch house because it's, like, occult-based house music [...] I did this best-of-the-year thing with Pitchfork about witch house [...] I was saying that we were witch house bands, and 2010 was going to be the year of witch house [...] It took off from there. [...] But, at the time, when I said witch house, it didn't even really exist.

Shortly after its mention in Pitchfork, other mainstream music blogs, press and sites began to use the term. Furthermore, Flavorwire stated that despite Egedy's rejection of the label, "the genre does exist now, for better or worse". By the early 2010s, the genre rose to prominence online through association with early internet aesthetic-related microgenres such as chillwave, seapunk and vaporwave, as well as online subcultures that spawned on sites like Tumblr, Bandcamp and SoundCloud.

Additionally, "rape gaze", coined by Brooklyn-based duo Creep, was briefly associated with the genre, labelled on the band's Myspace page, and used in the New York Press. However, after being featured in a Pitchfork article in 2010, the term quickly drew heavy backlash and controversy, with editors rewording the article and Creep later issuing a statement disavowing the label: "we would never want to advocate sexual violence against any human being. It was a play on words which we never expected to be used as an actual genre."

== Decline and legacy ==
By the early to mid-2010s, witch house began to fall out of prominence online, due to the inactivity of major record labels such as Disaro, Black Bvs Records, and Tundra Dubs, as well as prominent artists taking breaks or disappearing from the scene.

In 2013, Creep commented on the genre's status in an interview with Vice, stating, "we're glad witch house is dead." In 2021, Pitchfork cited Salem's unconventional live performances as a contributing factor to the decline of the movement. Subsequently, Mike Lesuer of Flood Magazine wrote retrospectively in 2023, claiming that of the many "subgenres that define the early-’10s, many of them can only be stumbled upon in 2023 by finding a Tumblr account that hasn’t seen activity since the height of seapunk—which, like witch house, likely faded from memory because no one could think of a cooler name for it".

Despite its decline as an active scene, witch house had a lasting influence on subsequent music.

In 2013, Kanye West recruited Jack Donoghue of Salem to work on his album Yeezus, with his production particularly inspiring the song "Black Skinhead".

Additionally, underground hip-hop artists such as Black Kray, Wicca Phase Springs Eternal, and Sematary have cited witch house as an influence. Mainstream artists such as A$AP Rocky, PartyNextDoor and The Weeknd have also released material inspired by the genre. In 2024, Pitchfork featured witch house on their list, "25 Microgenres That (Briefly) Defined the Last 25 Years," claiming it as a progenitor of darker themes being explored in online rap music.

== See also ==
- Styles of house music
- List of electronic music genres
- List of hip-hop genres
- Wave music
