= Casey MQ =

Canadian musician (born 1991)

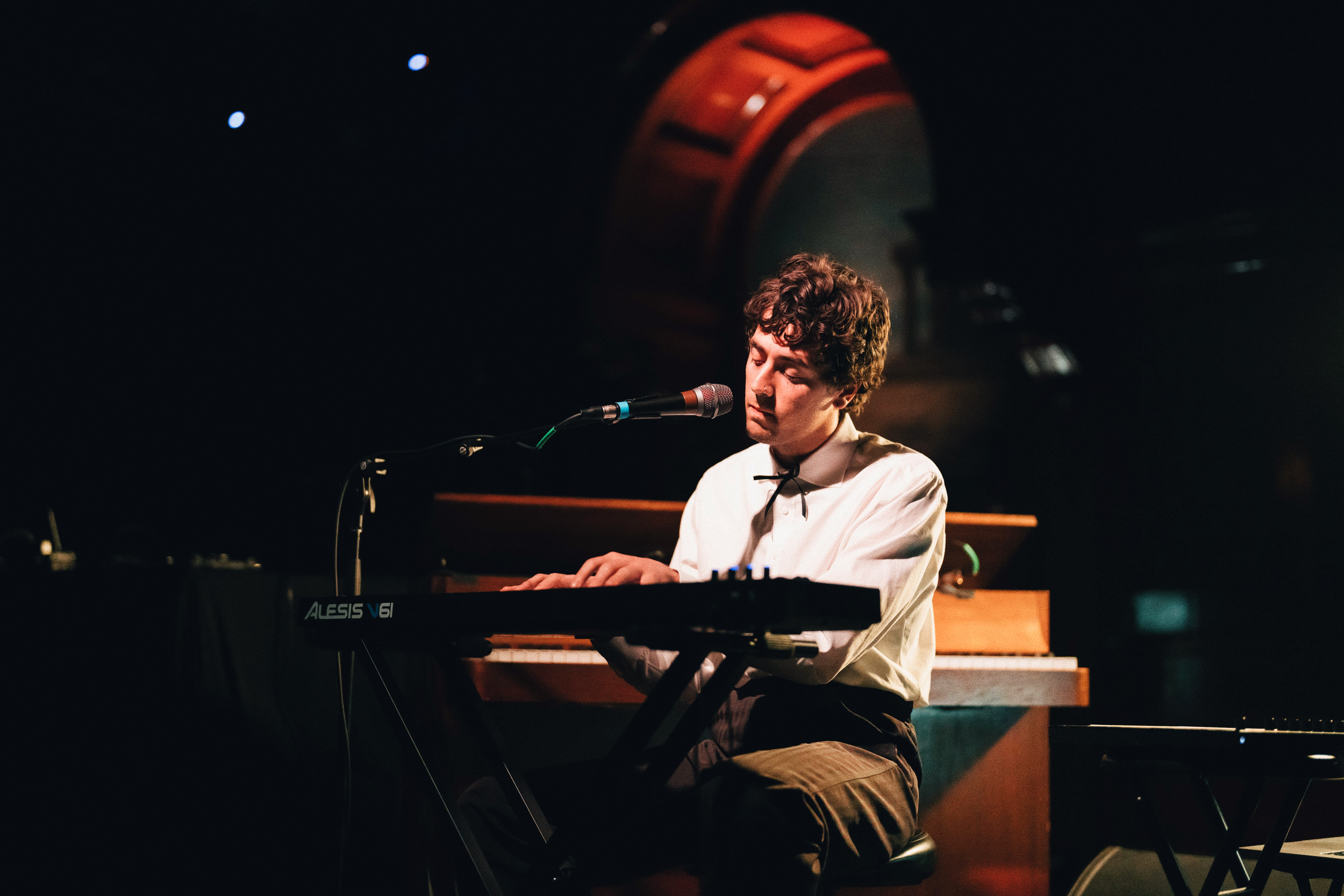
- Casey MQ performing at Lodge Room in Los Angeles. Photo by Will Buckley

Background information
- Born: Casey Manierka-Quaile; December 4, 1991 (age 34); Hamilton, Ontario, Canada
- Genres: experimental pop, electronic pop
- Occupations: Singer; Musician; Film composer; Songwriter; Record producer

Casey William Manierka-Quaile (born 4 December 1991), better known as Casey MQ, is a Canadian singer, musician, film composer, songwriter, and record producer. In 2022, he won the Canadian Screen Award for Best Original Song at the 10th Canadian Screen Awards for "And Then We Don't", a song he co-wrote with Tika Simone for Thyrone Tommy's film Learn to Swim. He collaborated with artists such as Oklou, Empress of, Shygirl, Eartheater, and Vagabon.

== Career ==
Casey began his career studying classical piano. He would begin producing electronic music in the early 2010’s. In 2015 he began scoring films after attending the Canadian Film Centre for one year.

MQ released his solo debut album, titled babycasey, in 2020. In the same year, he was one of the creators of Club Quarantine, a popular Zoom-based online club night for LGBTQ audiences during the COVID-19 pandemic. The virtual series became a massive cultural phenomenon, featuring performances from Lady Gaga, Charli XCX, and Pabllo Vittar, among others.

In 2016 he met oklou at Red Bull Music Academy and they would go on to make their first duo EP together entitled ‘For The Beast’. His debut album would be a conceptual pop album titled ‘babycasey’.

Upon the release of his debut album and co-producing Galore with oklou, Casey moved to Los Angeles to further entrench himself in production, songwriting and scoring.

In 2024 he released his 2nd album with the label Ghostly International entitled ‘Later that day, the day before, or the day before that’. In 2025, he reunited with oklou to co produce her next album ‘choke enough’. He was one of the producers on Cadence Weapon's Polaris Music Prize-winning album Parallel World.

== Discography ==
=== Albums ===
- babycasey (2020, Halcoline Trance)
- Later that day, the day before, or the day before that (2024, Ghostly International)

=== EPs ===
- For the Beasts (with oklou) (2017, self-released)
- Nudes (2018, Creamcake)
- Two Songs (Live) (2023, Cascine)

=== As film composer ===
- Mary Goes Round (with Dillon Baldassero, 2017, dir. Molly McGlynn)
- Firecrackers (2018, dir. Jasmin Mozaffari)
- Honey Bee (2018, dir. Rama Rau)
- Tito (2019, dir. Grace Glowicki)
- Easy Land (2019, dir. Sanja Živković)
- Raf (2019, dir. Harry Cepka)
- Fitting In (2023, dir. Molly McGlynn)
- Backspot (2023, dir. D. W. Waterson)
- The Heirloom (2024, dir. Ben Petrie)
- Julian and the Wind (2024, dir. Connor Jessup)

=== Remixes ===
- Jeremy Dutcher – "Pomok na Poktoinskwes" (2018)
- Christine and the Queens – "Comme si" (2019)
- Détente – "Candles in the Wind" (2021)
- Sophia Bel – "You're Not Real You're Just a Ghost" (2021)
- Anna Clandening – "Girls Like You" (2022)
- Rose Gray – "Everything Changes (But I Won't)" (feat. Shygirl) (2025)

=== Guest appearances ===
- WolF J McFarlane – "Deaf Ears" (2013)
- Emay – "7th" (2017)
- 2nd Son – "Only Underground" (2017)
- Cadence Weapon – "Infinity Pool" (2018)
- DJ Charme – "Saudade" (2018)
- L CON – "The Art of Staying Together" (2018)
- Suicideyear – "Said and Done" (2018)
- Desiire – "Goodbyes" (2018)
- Sparrows – "On Air" (2019)
- PBDY – "Prey/Pray" (2019)
- oklou – "girl on my throne" (2020)
- a l l i e – "Clean Sight" (2021)
- Aasthma – "3AM" (2022)
- Bliptor – "Back of Mind" (2022)
- myst milano. – "NBHD" (2023)
- Nick Léon – "Ocean Apart" (2025)

=== Syncs in Film, TV Shows and Fashion Campaigns ===
- “Lurk” by Casey MQ & Oklou – Mugler SS25 Fashion Show (2024)
- “Candyboy” by Casey MQ – OOC Trailer - Bloody Hell Film (2024)
- “Lurk” by Casey MQ & Oklou – Dior Spring Summer digital campaign (2024)
- “Lurk’ by Casey MQ & Oklou – Dior Spring Summer runway show (2024)
- “Candyboy” by Casey MQ – Bloody Hell Film (2024)
- “Everlasting” by Casey MQ & Oklou – Eat The Night Film (2024)“Lurk” by Casey MQ & Oklou – DIOR Women’s Show SS26 (2025)
- “The Call” by Casey Manierka-Quaile – CHANEL Haute Couture Automne Hiver 2025-26 (2025)

=== Other contributions ===
Title	Year	Lead artist	Album	Credit(s)				
Title	Year	Lead artist	Album	Writing	Production	Instrumentation	Vocals	Arrangement
"Get Up"	2018	TiKA	Non-album single		Co			
"Anywayz"	2020	Austra	HiRUDiN		Additional			
"It's Amazing"	2020	Austra	HiRUDiN		Additional			
"I Am Not Waiting"	2020	Austra	HiRUDiN		Additional			
"fall"	2020	oklou	Galore		Additional			
"unearth me"	2020	oklou	Galore		Additional			
"god's chariots"	2020	oklou	Galore	Yes	Co			
"galore"	2020	oklou	Galore	Yes	Co			
"nightime"	2020	oklou	Galore	Yes	Co		Additional	
"asturias" (feat. Zero Castigo)	2020	oklou	Galore					Additional
"rosebud"	2020	oklou	Galore	Yes	Co			
"girl on my throne" (feat. Casey MQ)	2020	oklou	Galore	Yes	Yes		Featured	
"another night"	2020	oklou	Galore	Yes	Co			
"Connect"	2021	Cadence Weapon	Parallel World	Yes	Yes			
"Clean Sight" (feat. Casey MQ)	2021	a l l i e	Tabula Rasa		Yes		Featured	
"Highest Building" (feat. oklou)	2022	Flume	Palaces	Yes				
"No Sleep"	2023	Sophia Bel	Anxious Avoidant Deluxe		Co			
"Suburban Mall Jewelry"	2023	Thoom	Fantasy for Danger	Yes	Co			
"Make It Work For Me"	2023	Thoom	Fantasy for Danger	Yes	Yes			
"Puppets for the Gods"	2023	Rozie Ramati	Non-album single		Co			
"Crush" (feat. Erika de Casier)	2023	Shygirl	Nymph_o	Yes	Co			
"Malocchio"	2023	Kara Lane	Chokehold EP	Yes	Co			
"Fruit (Red, White & Royal Blue Version)	2023	Oliver Sim	Red, White & Royal Blue (Amazon Original Motion Picture Soundtrack)		Yes			Yes
"Lexicon"	2023	Vagabon	Sorry I Haven't Called	Yes	Additional	Programming		
"Autobahn"	2023	Vagabon	Sorry I Haven't Called	Yes	Additional	Wurlitzer, organ		
"Nothing to Lose"	2023	Vagabon	Sorry I Haven't Called			Synthesizer		
"Interlude"	2023	Vagabon	Sorry I Haven't Called		Additional	Synthesizer, drum programming		
"Made Out with Your Best Friend"	2023	Vagabon	Sorry I Haven't Called	Yes	Additional	Synthesizer, drum programming		
"Sugarcane Switch"	2023	Eartheater	Powders	Yes	Co			
"Clean Break"	2023	Eartheater	Powders	Yes	Co			
"rosa"	2023	Namasenda	Ambrosia		Co			
"Idolize"	2023	Dorian Electra	Fanfare	Yes	Co			
"Yes Man"	2023	Dorian Electra	Fanfare	Yes	Co			
"Touch Grass"	2023	Dorian Electra	Fanfare	Yes	Co			
"Lifetime"	2023	Dorian Electra	Fanfare	Yes	Co			
"Warning Signs"	2023	Dorian Electra	Fanfare	Yes	Co			
"CUT MY HEART OUT"	2023	daine	TBA	Yes	Co			
"Precious/Pressure"	2023	a l l i e	TBA	Yes	Yes			
"For Your Consideration"	2024	Empress Of	For Your Consideration	Yes	Additional			
"What Type of Girl Am I?"	2024	Empress Of	For Your Consideration	Yes	Yes			
"Baby Boy"	2024	Empress Of	For Your Consideration	Yes	Additional			
"Alarms" (feat. Austra)	2024	Cadence Weapon	ROLLERCOASTER	Yes	Yes			
"Fire"	2024	rei brown	Aura	Yes				
"Not Your Angel"	2024	Zsela	Big For You	Yes	Co	Synthesizer, live drums, piano		
"Brand New"	2024	Zsela	Big For You	Yes				
"Play"	2024	Zsela	Big For You	Yes	Co	Piano, synthesizer, drum		
"Blink Twice"	2024	Cecile Believe	Tender the Spark	Yes				
"Red Brick"	2024	Cecile Believe	Tender the Spark	Yes	Co			
"Blue Sun"	2024	Cecile Believe	Tender the Spark	Yes	Co			
"10 in the Morning (Demo)"	2024	Dorian Electra	Fanfare: The Lost Demos	Yes	Co			
"endless"	2025	oklou	choke enough	Yes	Co			
"thank you for recording"	2025	oklou	choke enough	Yes	Co			
"family and friends"	2025	oklou	choke enough	Yes	Co		Additional	
"obvious"	2025	oklou	choke enough	Yes	Co			
"ict"	2025	oklou	choke enough	Yes	Co			
"choke enough"	2025	oklou	choke enough	Yes	Co			
"take me by the hand" (feat. Bladee)	2025	oklou	choke enough	Yes	Co			
"plague dogs"	2025	oklou	choke enough	Yes	Co			
"forces"	2025	oklou	choke enough	Yes	Co			
"harvest sky" (feat. underscores)	2025	oklou	choke enough	Yes	Co			
"want to wanna come back"	2025	oklou	choke enough	Yes	Co			
"blade bird"	2025	oklou	choke enough	Yes	Co			
"Virtue"	2025	Mallrat	Light hit my face like a straight right	Yes	Yes			
"The Light Streams In and Hits My Face"	2025	Mallrat	Light hit my face like a straight right	Yes	Yes			
"Love Songs / Heart Strings"	2025	Mallrat	Light hit my face like a straight right	Yes	Yes			
"Take It Off"	2025	Soo Joo	No Ghost		Co			
"Nova"	2025	Eartheater	Non-album single	Yes		Piano		
