= The Heirloom =

The Heirloom may refer to:

- The Heirloom (2005 film), a Taiwanese/Hong Kong film directed by Leste Chen,
- The Heirloom (2024 film), a Canadian film directed by Ben Petrie.
