= Hold on Tight (Aespa song) =

Single by Aespa

from the album Tetris (Soundtrack from the Apple Original Film)
- Released: March 31, 2023
- Genre: Techno
- Length: 2:29
- Label: Parlophone; Marv Music
- Songwriters: Aaron Hibell; Boy Matthews; Dave Labrel; Georgia Ku; Ivan Larionov
- Producer: Aaron Hibell

Aespa singles chronology
"Beautiful Christmas" (2022)	"Hold on Tight" (2023)	"Welcome to My World" (2023)

Music video
- "Hold on Tight" on YouTube

"Hold on Tight" is a song recorded by South Korean girl group Aespa for the soundtrack of the 2023 biographical thriller film Tetris. It was released as a digital single on March 31, 2023, by Parlophone and Marv Music.

== Background and release ==
On March 17, 2023, SM Entertainment confirmed that Aespa would release an original song for the movie the soundtrack. This marked the first time Aespa released a soundtrack recording as a group. The song was released on March 31, 2023. Its music video was released on June 6, 2023.

== Composition ==
"Hold on Tight" was described as an addictive techno genre song with a familiar melody that uses the theme song of Tetris in the mind, and the lyrics metaphorically incorporate the protagonist's difficult journey by comparing it to a Tetromino.

== Charts ==
Chart performance for "Hold on Tight"
Chart (2023)	Peak position
South Korea Download (Circle)	116
New Zealand Hot Singles (RMNZ)	32
Singapore Regional (RIAS)	20
Vietnam (Vietnam Hot 100)	30

== Release history ==
Region	Date	Format	Label	Ref.
Various	March 31, 2023	Digital download; streaming	Parlophone; Marv Music	
