= Legions of Hell =

Legion(s) of Hell or Hell's legion(s) may refer to:

- Legion (demons), a group of demons in Christianity
- The Legion of Hell, an army of llaneros who fought against the Second Republic of Venezuela led by Simón Bolívar

== Media ==
- Legions of Hell, the inhabitants of the fictional location Hell in works published by DC Comics
- Legions of Hell, a 1987 fantasy novel by C. J. Cherryh in the Heroes in Hell series
- Legions of Hell, a style of play in the pen and paper role-playing game Noctum
- Legions of Hell, a group of antagonists in the 2022 superhero film, Black Adam
  - "Legions of Hell", an eponymous track on the score album Black Adam

== See also ==
- Devil (Dungeons & Dragons)
- List of demons in the Ars Goetia
