= Dead Lover =

2025 film

- Film poster
- Directed by: Grace Glowicki
- Written by: Grace Glowicki; Ben Petrie
- Produced by: Grace Glowicki; Ben Petrie; Yona Strauss
- Starring: Grace Glowicki; Ben Petrie; Leah Doz; Lowen Morrow
- Cinematography: Rhayne Vermette
- Edited by: Lev Lewis
- Music by: U.S. Girls
- Distributed by: Cartuna; Dweck Productions
- Release date: January 24, 2025 (Sundance)
- Running time: 84 minutes
- Country: Canada
- Language: English
- Budget: <$350,000
- Box office: $108,513

Dead Lover is a 2025 Canadian comedy film directed, co-written, produced by and starring Grace Glowicki, co-writer Ben Petrie, Leah Doz, and Lowen Morrow. Inspired by Mary Shelley's 1818 novel Frankenstein; or, The Modern Prometheus, it follows a woman's attempt to resurrect her deceased lover.

The film debuted at the Sundance Film Festival in the Midnight category on January 24, 2025. Yellow Veil Pictures serves as its sales agency.

== Plot ==
The Gravedigger lives a lonely life in her shack by the graveyard, the stench of her body driving away all human contact, including the Priest who lays the dead to rest. She whiles away her days trying to concoct a perfume that will overpower her smell, and performing memorials for the recently deceased (about whom she knows nothing).

After the funeral of an Opera singer, the Gravedigger observes the singer's unhappy Widower and brother. The brother, a poet, is overcome with emotion and runs into the woods, where he is attacked by a wolf, but is saved by the Gravedigger, who slays it. He seems untroubled by her smell - in fact, aroused by it - and becomes her Lover.

The pair enjoy nights of passion and exchange rings, but when the Gravedigger expresses a desire to die elderly in the arms of the Lover surrounded by their children, grandchildren and great-grandchildren, the Lover departs, saying in a letter that he is infertile, but has gone across the sea for experimental surgery to correct this. He leaves her a blue rosebush to tend in his absence.

While the elderly town Gossips speculate that he's off having affairs, the Gravedigger waits for his return. Unfortunately, he is lost at sea, with only his ring finger surviving. Three Sailors bring the finger to the Gravedigger, who is initially driven catatonic, then insane, and plots to regrow the Lover as she grew his rosebush. Using the regenerative properties of a lizard's tail and the power of lightning, she succeeds in regrowing only a three-foot long sentient finger.

The Gravedigger and the Lover's finger enjoy a torrid affair, but she longs for more. She digs up the dead Opera Singer and severs the body's finger, replacing it with the long sentient finger, and again uses lizard juice and lightning to fuse the two. The Lover takes over the Opera Singer's body, but it is now mentally disabled and acts like a child.

The Gossips tell the Widower that they saw the Gravedigger exhuming his wife's corpse and he raids her shack, causing the Lover to flee into the woods, where it masturbates on a tree stump. It spots a Sailor swimming in the sea and seduces and kills him.

Meanwhile, the Widower has knocked out and kidnapped the Gravedigger in an effort to find the Opera Singer's body. The two bond over lost love, and the Widower muses that he lacks the bravery that the Gravedigger had in resurrecting the Lover. The Gravedigger escapes and reaches her shack just as the Gossips, Sailors and Priest arrive to kill her for graverobbing.

The Widower kills the mob, and enters the shack to find that the Lover has killed the Gravedigger. Knowing that the Lover is in the body, not the Opera Singer, he spots the severed finger of the Opera Singer in a jar, grabs it and flees, intending to resurrect her elsewhere. After he leaves, the Lover uses the Gravedigger's tech to resurrect her in the body of the dead Sailor. The final shot of the film is the Lover, in the body of the Opera Singer, and the Gravedigger, in the body of the Sailor, embracing lovingly on a grave.

== Cast ==
- Grace Glowicki as Gravedigger
- Ben Petrie as Lover/Finger/Swimmer/Gossip/Sailor/Nun/Butler
- Leah Doz as Creature/Dead Opera Singer/Priest/Gossip/Sailor
- Lowen Morrow as Widower/Dead Lady/Gossip/Sailor/Nun

== Production ==
Grace Glowicki made her directorial debut with Tito in 2019. Dead Lover was co-written by Glowicki and Ben Petrie. Glowicki, Petrie, and four friends drafted ideas for a film and then acted it out with friends from community theatre. After the script was completed the cast, which were not assigned characters at the time except for Glowicki, rehearsed it over the course of six weeks. The actors were given their characters three weeks before shooting.

Dead Lover was shot on 16 mm film using an Arri SR3 and Bolex over 16 days at AstroLabs Studios in Toronto, for less than $350,000. All of the sets were two black box stages that were redecorated for each scene. Glowicki wanted the film to be similar to "DIY, low-budget experimental theater."

Glowicki initially wanted to edit the film herself. Lev Lewis was given the dailies and made an assembly cut before being hired months later to make the final edit using Adobe Premiere Pro to edit the film. Lewis knew Glowicki as she starred in a project he co-wrote years prior and was contacted by producer Yona Strauss. Test screenings were conducted with groups as low as 5 or as high as 40. Lewis found the massing of the mob near the end of the film to be the most difficult scene to edit.

Glowicki has cited Frankenstein, Monty Python, Saturday Night Live, Mel Brooks, exploitation films, theater, and cartoons as inspirations to Dead Lover. The cinematographer was Rhayne Vermette, who emulated the style of 1930s colour films using "dollar store lights". Glowicki told Vermette to look at the films of Kenneth Anger for reference.

The music was done by U.S. Girls.

== Release ==
Dead Lover premiered at the Sundance Film Festival on 24 January 2025. It has also been shown at the International Film Festival Rotterdam and Gothenburg Film Festival. After being shown at South by Southwest the North American distribution rights were acquired by Cartuna and Dweck Productions through the joint venture of Cartuna x Dweck, the first film it has acquired.

Kurt Ravenwood, who conducted the advertising for Hundreds of Beavers, will provide marketing strategy for Dead Lover.

The film made its Canadian premiere in the Midnight Madness program at the 2025 Toronto International Film Festival.

== Reception ==
On the review aggregator website Rotten Tomatoes, 87% of 47 critics' reviews are positive. The website's consensus reads: "A bonkers riff on the lengths people will go to for connection, Dead Lover's singular sensibility can be an acquired taste but writer-director Grace Glowicki's vision is admirably one of a kind." Metacritic, which uses a weighted average, assigned the film a score of 77 out of 100, based on eight critics, indicating "generally favorable" reviews.

Josh Korngut of Dread Central gave the film four out of five stars and called it "an outrageously comedic and transgressive love story" that "blurs the lines between beauty and grotesqueness, life and death, crafting a visceral, punk-tinged quilt of grief, transformation, and the lengths we’ll go for love."

Murtada Elfadl, writing for Variety, praised the ingenuity of the makeup, production design, sound, and lighting, but criticized the later half of the film as repetitive. Vikram Murthi, writing for IndieWire, gave the film a C+, calling it "admirable", but concluding that its bit was "frustratingly static" and that its "prolonged, forced zaniness unfortunately taints everything it touches."

Jacob Oller of The A.V. Club gave the film a C and called its bit "charming", but lamented that "as the thin resurrection-gone-wrong film wears on, Glowicki's mugging becomes more grating than funny, and its amusing novelty begins to rot after being unnaturally extended past its normal lifespan."

== Works cited ==
=== News ===
- ""Knowing How to Take Feedback Is an Art": Editor Lev Lewis on Dead Lover". Filmmaker. 24 January 2025. Archived from the original on 12 March 2025.
- ""The Camera Team Was Also the SFX Team": DP Rhayne Vermette on Dead Lover". Filmmaker. 24 January 2025. Archived from the original on 12 March 2025.
- Dunn, Jack (7 March 2025). "'Dead Lover': How Director Grace Glowicki Pulled Off the Grotesque Indie Romance With Dollar Store Lights, Kiddie Pools and a Single Zoom Lens". Variety. Archived from the original on 12 March 2025.
- Elfadl, Murtada (2 February 2025). "'Dead Lover' Review: Macabre Attempt to Keep a Lost Romance Alive Is Both Entertaining and Inventive". Variety. Archived from the original on 14 March 2025.
- Gallina, Michelle (24 January 2025). "Sundance 2025: How Editor Lev Lewis Crafted Cinematic Fever Dream "Dead Lover" on Premiere Pro". Adobe Blog. Archived from the original on 12 March 2025.
- Goodfellow, Melanie (11 March 2025). "New Distribution Venture Cartuna X Dweck Takes North American Rights For Sundance & SXSW Thriller 'Dead Lover'". Deadline Hollywood. Archived from the original on 12 March 2025.
- Murthi, Vikram (25 January 2025). "'Dead Lover' Review: This Campy Lo-Fi Frankenstein Riff Remains Stuck in One Comedic Register". IndieWire. Archived from the original on 14 March 2025.
- Navarro, Meagan (24 January 2025). "'Dead Lover' Gets Experimental with Raunchy, Comedic Riff on 'Frankenstein' [Exclusive Poster Reveal]". Bloody Disgusting. Archived from the original on 14 March 2025.

=== Web ===
- "Dead Lover". International Film Festival Rotterdam. Archived from the original on 12 March 2025.
