= Bercinta dengan Maut =

Indonesian drama mystery television series

- Also known as: The Other Sister
- Genre: Drama; Mystery
- Created by: Rocky Soraya; Agung PD Nugroho; Rina Wulandari
- Written by: Riheam Junianti
- Directed by: Dom Dharmo
- Starring: Haico Van der Veken; Maxime Bouttier; Teuku Rassya; Dinda Kirana
- Theme music composer: Joseph S Djafar
- Opening theme: "Mirror Blood Oath", Bella
- Ending theme: "Mirror Blood Oath", Bella
- Composer: Joseph S Djafar
- Country of origin: Indonesia
- Original language: Indonesian
- No. of seasons: 1
- No. of episodes: 10

Production
- Executive producers: Rocky Soraya; Anto Sihombing; Ikhsan Sasmita
- Producers: Rocky Soraya; Agung PD Nugroho; Rina Wulandari
- Cinematography: Adrian Sugiono
- Camera setup: Multi-camera
- Running time: 60 minutes
- Production company: Hitmaker Studios

Original release
- Network: iQIYI; MAXstream
- Release: 29 May – 24 July 2026

Bercinta dengan Maut (transl. The Other Sister) is an Indonesian television drama mystery series produced by Hitmaker Studios which aired on 29 May 2026 on iQIYI and MAXstream. It is Indonesia's first iQIYI original series and starred Haico Van der Veken, Maxime Bouttier, Teuku Rassya and Dinda Kirana.

== Plot ==
Raya, a tough stripper living under the pressure of debt, trauma, and loneliness, discovers a shocking truth one night: she has an identical twin sister named Anna, a gentle woman from a wealthy family married to the son of the Ardana family—a powerful business and political dynasty in the country.

For Raya and Anna, the meeting is a miracle: they have finally found the only family they have.

But their happiness is short-lived. Anna dies mysteriously.

Raya finds her twin's body and quickly realizes that the Ardana family and their inner circle have been causing Anna's suffering all this time, and are very likely involved in her death.

Driven by love, anger, revenge, and a desire for justice, Raya makes a bold decision: she disguises herself as Anna, who is thought to have survived, and infiltrates the Ardana family to fight and destroy them one by one from within, all the while searching for Anna's true killer.

Each episode becomes a strategic "revenge game." The scandals and secrets that have been tightly concealed by the Ardana family's perfect image are revealed one by one.

But as the game grows increasingly dangerous, Raya's true identity is nearly revealed, and love begins to blossom in the wrong place.

Raya falls in love with Aldo, Anna's husband, a man who turns out not to be entirely evil and who also sacrificed his parents' ambitions. At the same time, Ezra, Aldo's best friend with a hidden agenda, also falls in love with her. This love triangle places Raya at the crossroads of revenge, truth, and her own safety.

== Cast ==
- Haico Van der Veken as Raya/Anna
- Maxime Bouttier as Aldo Ardana
- Teuku Rassya as Ezra Gautama
- Dinda Kirana as Bella Azairana
- Baby Kristami as Pauline
- Aruma Khadijah as Noura Ardana
- Willem Bevers as Dipa Ardana
- Putri Patricia as Sofia Ardana
- Rhani as Ibu Bella
- Monique Henry as Joyce
- Marini Zumarnis as Eva Kusuma

== Production ==
=== Development ===
In January 2026, iQIYI announced a new series titled Bercinta dengan Maut.

=== Casting ===
Haico Van der Veken was confirmed to play female lead, Raya/Anna. Maxime Bouttier was reported to play male lead, Aldo Ardana. The series was the second collaboration between Veken and Bouttier, after Kain Kafan Hitam (2019). Dinda Kirana was finalised to play Bella. Teuku Rassya was selected to play Ezra.
