= Hemorrhage (disambiguation) =

Hemorrhage or haemorrhage is the leakage or loss of blood from the body.

Hemorrhage or Haemorrhage may also refer to:

- Hemorrhage (film), a 2012 Canadian horror thriller film directed by Braden Croft
- "Hemorrhage (In My Hands)", a song by Fuel from Something Like Human, 2000
- Haemorrhage (band), a Spanish goregrind band
