= Tetris (soundtrack) =

Soundtrack of the 2023 film Tetris

Tetris (Soundtrack from the Apple Original Film)

Soundtrack album by various artists
- Released: 31 March 2023
- Recorded: January–March 2023
- Genres: Electronic; classical; chip tune
- Length: 55:06
- Labels: Parlophone; Marv Music
- Producer: Lorne Balfe

Singles from Tetris (Soundtrack from the Apple Original Film)
- 1. "Benevolence" Released: 17 March 2023; 2. "Hold on Tight" Released: 31 March 2023

Tetris (Soundtrack from the Apple Original Film) is the soundtrack to the 2023 biographical film of the same name. It features original score cues from the film composed by Lorne Balfe and songs performed by Aaron Hibell, aespa, Polina, ReN, as well as remixes of yesteryear songs newly produced for the film. The album was released on 31 March 2023 by Parlophone Records and Marv Music, and was led by two singles — "Benevolence" by Aaron Hibell and "Hold on Tight" by Aespa released on 17 and 24 March.

== Background ==
The soundtrack features music inspired from the 1980s era as well as Russian versions of classic tracks, including "Heart of Glass" and "Holding Out for a Hero", and most of them being licensed for the film. The 19th century Russian folk song "Korobeiniki" that was used as the theme for the Tetris video game, was reworked by Lorne Balfe and Metaphronic under the title "Tetris Theme Reworked". The album features two original songs: "Hold on Tight" by the K-pop girl group Aespa, and "Benevolence" by DJ Aaron Hibell.

Russian-American singer Polina contributed to three of the tracks, which are licensed tracks of classical songs. She said that "I got to record some of my favorite songs, I usually write soundtracks but this time around, I performed the soundtracks and it was such an honor to perform Blondie and Pat Benatar. Such legends and iconic songs."

== Track listing ==
No.	Title	Artist(s)	Length
1.	"Benevolence"	Aaron Hibell	2:30
2.	"Opportunities (Let's Make Lots of Money)" (full length 7'' mix; 2001 remaster)	Pet Shop Boys	4:36
3.	"The Final Countdown"	Europe	5:07
4.	"Holding Out for a Hero" (Japanese)	ReN	4:08
5.	"Hold on Tight"	Aespa	2:29
6.	"Heart of Glass" (Russian)	Polina	4:14
7.	"Tetris Theme Reworked"	Metrophonic	1:31
8.	"Two Tribes"	Lorne Balfe; Kevin Blumenfeld	1:35
9.	"Puzzle Piece"	Balfe	5:22
10.	"Fall Into Place"	Balfe	6:20
11.	"Stacking Squares"	Lorne Balfe	4:25
12.	"Schneidig Op Vor 79"	Admiralty Band of Russia	2:02
13.	"Farewell Slavianka"	Red Army Choir	2:36
14.	"Holding Out for a Hero" (Russian)	Polina	3:48
15.	"Heart of Glass"	Polina	4:14
Total length:			55:06

== Reception ==
The music received mostly positive reviews from critics. Aurora Amidon of Paste called it as "groovy, video game-like score". Alex Maidy of JoBlo.com wrote "Lorne Balfe's music is rooted in the MIDI sounds of classic Nintendo and arcade video games, while the 8-bit graphic transitions used through the movie lend a fun vibe. The period-appropriate music also adds a nice element." Tim Grierson of Screen International wrote "Baird leans into the bizarreness of this tale’s stranger-than-fiction premise while affectionately mocking the period’s dated tech and pop songs. The playfulness extends to establishing shots that are presented as 8-bit graphics, while Lorne Balfe’s score mimics the cheesy-futuristic keyboard style of ‘80s sci-fi soundtracks." Dan Jolin of Empire called it as "a predictably catchy electro score".

Matt Donato of IGN wrote "Lorne Balfe’s original score, meanwhile, is an early frontrunner for my favorite of the year; the familiar notes of Tetris’ stage background music bounce around Balfe’s compositions like smooth Synthwave jams or quirky chip-tune remixes." Catie McCarthy of Screen Speck wrote "composer Lorne Balfe elevates the already-iconic Tetris theme into a dramatic spectacle" and also commented "The needle-drops are similarly fantastic, too, with classics like “The Final Countdown” and “Holding Out for a Hero” playing in multiple languages to thematic effect." Patrick Cremona of Radio Times wrote "The electronic score by Lorne Balfe also makes excellent use of the iconic Tetris theme music, while there is a soundtrack that includes a number of enjoyable if fairly obvious era-appropriate needle drops. It all adds up to something that might not quite live up to the film's billing as a Cold War–era thriller "on steroids", but nonetheless manages to tell an intriguing story in an engaging and entertaining manner."

== Score album ==
Tetris (Score from the Apple Original Film)

Film score by Lorne Balfe
- Released: 21 April 2023
- Genre: Film score
- Length: 74:24
- Label: Lakeshore

Lorne Balfe chronology
Dungeons & Dragons: Honor Among Thieves (2023)	Tetris (2023)	Ghosted (2023)

Tetris (Score from the Apple Original Film) is the album containing the film score written and composed by Lorne Balfe. It was released on 21 April 2023 by Lakeshore Records.

No.	Title	Length
1.	"Falling Blocks"	4:14
2.	"Cutting Corners"	3:50
3.	"Building Blocks"	3:31
4.	"Tetrominoes" (feat. Joshua Pacey)	2:11
5.	"Down It Goes"	3:23
6.	"Liar Liar"	2:30
7.	"Misdrop"	3:32
8.	"The Matrix"	3:05
9.	"Rotate"	3:35
10.	"Orange Rocky"	2:22
11.	"Floor Kick"	1:54
12.	"Hard Drop"	2:54
13.	"Back to Bach"	2:32
14.	"Line Up"	3:38
15.	"Telling Lies"	3:34
16.	"Blue Ricky"	2:15
17.	"Shift It"	3:07
18.	"Tilting Tiles"	3:59
19.	"Shifting Shapes"	2:27
20.	"Rhode Island Z"	2:31
21.	"T-Spin"	2:52
22.	"Cleveland Z"	2:55
23.	"Lock Down"	2:05
24.	"TeeWee"	2:35
25.	"Deep Thoughts"	2:53
Total length:		74:24
