= Her Friend Adam =

- Directed by: Ben Petrie
- Written by: Ben Petrie
- Produced by: Kristy Neville
- Starring: Ben Petrie; Grace Glowicki; Andrew Chown
- Cinematography: Kelly Jeffrey
- Edited by: Ben Petrie
- Release date: January 22, 2016 (Sundance)
- Running time: 17 minutes
- Country: Canada
- Language: English

Her Friend Adam is a Canadian short drama film, written and directed by Ben Petrie and released in 2016. The film stars Petrie as Robert, a man whose insecurities about his relationship with his girlfriend Liv (Grace Glowicki) explode into a fight after he suspects her of having an affair with her friend Adam (Andrew Chown) even though Adam is gay.

The film was inspired in part by Petrie's own experiences of feeling misplaced jealousy in his own real-life relationship with Glowicki.

The film premiered at the 2016 Sundance Film Festival, where Glowicki won a Special Jury Award for Outstanding Performance.

It was named to the Toronto International Film Festival's annual year-end Canada's Top Ten list for 2016.
