= Raf (film) =

2019 film

- Film poster
- Directed by: Harry Cepka
- Written by: Harry Cepka
- Produced by: Sara Blake; Charlotte Wells
- Starring: Grace Glowicki; Jesse Stanley; Harry Cepka; Victor Dolhai
- Cinematography: Gregory Oke
- Edited by: Harry Cepka; Blair McClendon
- Music by: Casey Manierka-Quaile
- Production company: Ceroma Films
- Release date: September 10, 2019 (TIFF)
- Running time: 91 minutes
- Country: Canada
- Language: English

Raf is a 2019 Canadian dark comedy film, directed by Harry Cepka. The film stars Grace Glowicki as Raf, an aimless young woman in Vancouver, British Columbia whose life is changed when she befriends Tal (Jesse Stanley), a richer and more motivated woman with questionable motives.

The film premiered at the 2019 Toronto International Film Festival.

The film received a nomination at the Vancouver Film Critics Circle Awards 2019, for Best British Columbia Film.
