= Take Me by the Hand =

Single by Oklou featuring Bladee

from the album Choke Enough
- Released: 15 January 2025
- Genre: Trance pop; art pop; hyperpop; 2-step
- Length: 2:51
- Label: True Panther Sounds
- Songwriters: Marylou Mayniel; Benjamin Reichwald; Casey Manierka-Quaile; Caila Thompson-Hannant
- Composers: Marylou Mayniel; Casey Manierka-Quaile
- Producers: Oklou; Casey MQ

Oklou singles chronology
"Harvest Sky" (Danny L Harle C Mix) (2024)	"Take Me by the Hand" (2025)	"Blade Bird" (2025)

Bladee singles chronology
"TL;DR" (2024)	"Take Me by the Hand" (2025)	"Inferno" (2025)

Music video
- "Take Me by the Hand" on YouTube

"Take Me by the Hand" is a song by the French musician Oklou and the Swedish rapper Bladee, from the former's debut studio album, Choke Enough (2025). It was released on 15 January 2025, through True Panther Sounds, as the fourth single from the album. Having long desired to collaborate with Bladee or Ecco2k, Oklou wrote them messages after seeing them perform live. After Bladee wrote back, the two recorded "Take Me by the Hand". A trance pop, art pop, and hyperpop song, it is driven by a 2-step beat, airy synthesizers, and bleary vocals. Its lyrics contain a recurring theme of folklore and mythology.

Upon its release, "Take Me by the Hand" received positive reviews from music publications. Several publications ranked it among the best tracks of the week it was released; critics enjoyed hearing Oklou and Bladee collaborate. A music video directed by Tohé Commaret premiered alongside the song's release; it depicts Oklou and Bladee living in a world of their own as shown on a screen in an empty movie theater.

== Background and release ==
The French musician Oklou released "Family and Friends", her first solo track in almost three years, on 18 September 2024. On 16 October, she announced a tour across Europe and North American alongside two singles: "Harvest Sky" featuring Underscores and "Obvious". She announced her debut album, Choke Enough, alongside the release of its title track on 21 November; she also revealed its track list, which included the aforementioned singles. This was followed by "Take Me By the Hand" with the Swedish rapper Bladee, released on 15 January 2025, through True Panther Sounds; it appears as the eighth track on the album.

For some time before the song's creation, Oklou wanted to collaborate with either Bladee or Ecco2k. She had met Bladee a few times before creating "Take Me by the Hand" and they would exchange conversation: "Ah, we can do something together." In 2021, the two worked together on the remix of Bladee's song "Rainbow" with Mechatok. While she was writing Choke Enough, she attended a Drain Gang show in Los Angeles, which gave her the urge to write to Bladee and Ecco2k for a collaboration. Out of the two, Bladee was the only one to write back and they recorded "Take Me by the Hand". In a press release of the song, Oklou stated, "I wanted this song to sound like something ethereal but also very earthy. Bladee's voice is helping to keep the feet on the ground".

== Composition ==
"Take Me by the Hand" is 2 minutes and 51 seconds long. It was written by Oklou, Bladee, Casey Manierka-Quaile, and Cecile Believe; Oklou and Manierka-Quaile also composed and produced the track. Danny L Harle served as a co-producer and provided additional production; Nathan Boddy mixed the track while Matt Colton handled its mastering. Music journalists identified it as a trance pop, art pop, and hyperpop song. Its production is driven by a 2-step beat, airy synthesizers, and the duo trading lines in their blurred vocal performances. Its 2-step beat was compared to the early music from Burial by The Fader's Jordan Darville, while Abby Jones from Stereogum described its synthesizers as "icy" and "scintillating". Darville felt Oklou's lyrics sound like "they could be engraved on the side of a marble sculpture" and described Bladee's as "the kind you'd hear at the end of the most euphoric night of your life". Crack's Megan Wallace identified folklore and mythology as a recurring theme in the song's lyrics; specifically the line, "Holy inspiration comes / Through the nerves in this suspension".

== Critical reception ==
Upon its release, "Take Me by the Hand" received positive reviews from music publications. The Fader included it in their weekly list of "Songs You Need in Your Life"; Darville said it "might be the best entry point for new listeners" of Oklou. "Take Me by the Hand" was selected as one of Pitchfork's staff picks for best new music on the week of its release. Meaghan Garvey reviewed the song for the website, saying it "sets its sights on a feeling that's just out of reach"; in a review of Choke Enough for the same website, Walden Green felt Bladee's guest appearance "stand[s] out prominently" against the album's production. Paper ranked it among the week's best songs; Shaad D'Souza thought the song "adds a bit of brightness into both Bladee and Oklou's respective worlds", while Clash's Robin Murray said the duo balance each other out, calling it a "bold collaboration". For Sputnikmusic, Jesper called it "one of the most defined songs in the tracklist [of Choke Enough]".

== Music video ==
Tohé Commaret directed the music video for "Take Me By the Hand", which premiered the same day of the song's release. Oklou and Bladee both star in the music video. It depicts Oklou living in a world of her own, which is projected on a screen in an empty movie theater; Wallace said Bladee "beams into his feature as a ghostly light" in the video.
