= Aaron Hibell =

English techno DJ and producer

- Also known as: Hibell
- Born: April 9, 1996 (age 30)
- Origin: Leicestershire, England
- Genres: Techno; trance; contemporary classical
- Occupations: DJ; producer; composer; electronic musician
- Years active: 2021–present
- Labels: All Time High; Astralwerks; Universal
- Website: aaronhibell.com

Aaron Hibell (born April 9, 1996) previously known as Hibell, is an English DJ, record producer, composer and electronic artist.

He is best known for his distinct music production which has been described as a cinematic blend of orchestral productions with techno and trance music. His music production has earned him coverage and praise from electronic music outlets. Hibell's most popular releases include "Benevolence", an original song from the soundtrack of the Apple TV+ film Tetris, as well as remixes of Ludwig Göransson's "Destroyer of Worlds" from Oppenheimer and Billie Eilish's "Chihiro" which gained attention on social media.

== Early life ==
Hibell was raised in a small village in the Midlands, England. After finding his passion for making music he chose to drop out his studies at University, to focus full-time on making music. Inspired by classical music, Aaron started making beats in his bedroom and shortly he went to release his first mixtape on SoundCloud.

== Career ==
=== 2021-2023: Monastery of Sound and Twilight Zone ===
On October 16, 2021, Hibell released his debut mixtape titled Monastery of Sound. The project which contains eleven tracks served as an introduction to Hibell's production style, blending orchestral productions with electronic music. The mixtape included his debut single "Clint Eastwood", which was named after the American actor and director, a remix of Olivia Rodrigo's 2021 single "Deja Vu" which served as the mixtape's second single, and a remix of Bruno Mars' 2011 single "Talking to the Moon". The project received critical acclaim and online attraction which led Hibell to release two additional mixtapes, further establishing his unique sound design; Monastery of Sound (Vol. II) in 2022, and Monastery of Sound (Vol. III) in 2023.

In 2023, Hibell formed part of the soundtrack of the film Tetris which premiered at SXSW; he worked alongside Scottish composer Lorne Balfe, who took care of the original score. Hibell contributed with the song "Benevolence". Later on, Hibell released his debut extended play Twilight Zone under his own independent record label, all-time high. Shortly after, he uploaded a re-working of Swedish composer Ludwig Goransson's "Destroyer of Words" from the film Oppenheimer which was met with positive reviews.

=== 2024-present: Astral Projection and upcoming projects ===
In 2024, Hibell released his second extended play titled Astral Projection on March 13. It was promoted with the single "Levitation". The project included a collaboration with synthesizer and composer duo, Felsmann + Tiley. A non-single track "I Feel Lost" earned a lot attention after its release. Hibell would eventually release a deluxe edition on April 12, which features different mixes of the track.

"I was hoping for an official release after Billie and her mom both liked my posts but understandably they don't do official remixes. That being said her team was nice enough let us post to Soundcloud for you all to enjoy."

— Aaron Hibell, via Soundcloud.

During that year, he remixed "Chihiro" by American singer-songwriter Billie Eilish; the remix went viral and amassed over 50M views across social media platforms. Despite its success, it did not have an official release, with Hibell explaining on his social media the reasoning why.

In August, Hibell released a new track, titled "Morning Light" via the Astralwerks label. In September, he released a collaboration with DJ Alex Wann titled "Set Me Free"; the song was the 22nd most played song at the Amsterdam Dance Event (ADE) in 2024. In October, he collaborated on the track "Veni Vidi Vici" from Sara Landry's album Spiritual Driveby. Hibell served as the music producer of the original soundtrack for the Ultra Music Festival 2024 aftermovie Music Is the Answer, directed by A Final Kid.

== Artistry ==
Since his debut in the electronic scene, Hibell has been highlighted as one of the most exciting new acts in electronic music, with critics noticing his focus on pushing cinematic and electronic boundaries, while seamlessly blending techno, trance and house genres with orchestral music. Hibell has cited artists such as Hans Zimmer, Frank Dukes, Eric Prydz, Artbat, Lana Del Rey, and the Weeknd as influences to his work.

Fellow peers such as DubVision, Marnik, Alan Walker, and Ummet Ozcan have shown appreciation and admiration for Hibell and his work, while acts like Martin Garrix, Adriatique, Amelie Lens, Chris Avantgarde, Artbat, Alignment and more have supported Hibell's work live.

== Personal life ==
In 2024, Hibell opened up about struggling with the skin condition eczema from a young age, and that currently he was going through topical steroid withdrawal which led to a huge decline on his mental and physical health after stopping its use. He revealed that he chose quitting steroids due to the long time side effects.

== Discography ==
=== Studio albums ===
List of studio albums with selected details
Title	Details	Ref.
Synchronicity	Scheduled: 6 March 2026; Label: all time high; Astralwerks; Format: digital download, streaming	

=== Mixtapes ===
List of mixtapes with selected details
Title	Details	Ref.
Monastery of Sound (Mixtape Vol. I)	Release: October 16, 2021; Label: All Time High; Formats: Streaming	
Monastery of Sound (Mixtape Vol. II)	Release: October 18, 2022; Label: All Time High; Formats: Streaming	
Monastery of Sound (Mixtape Vol. III)	Release: July 6, 2023; Label: All Time High; Formats: Streaming	

=== EPs ===
List of extended plays with selected details
Title	Details	Ref.
Twilight Zone	Release: August 31, 2023; Label: All Time High; Formats: DL, streaming	
Astral Projection	Release: March 13, 2024; Label: All Time High; Formats: DL, streaming	

=== Reissues ===
List of reissues with selected details
Title	Details	Ref.
Monastery of Sound (Mixtape, Vol. 1) [DJ Mix]	Release:December 2, 2022; Label: All Time High; Formats: DL, streaming	
Astral Projection (Deluxe Edition)	Release: April 12, 2024; Label: All Time High; Formats: DL, streaming	

=== Singles ===
List of singles, showing year released, and originating album
Title	Year	Album	Ref.
"Clint Eastwood"	2021	Monastery of Sound (Mixtape, Vol. 1)	
"deja vu" (edit)	2021	Monastery of Sound (Mixtape, Vol. 1)	
"euphoria"	2022	Non-album single	
"talking to the moon"	2022	Non-album single	
"ghost" (featuring HÜMAN)	2023	Synchronicity	
"destroyer of worlds"	2023	Non-album single	
"Benevolence"	2023	Tetris (Motion Picture Soundtrack)	
"Levitation"	2024	Astral Projection	
"1999"	2024	Exhale Va005	
"morning light"	2024	Synchronicity	
"set me free" (with Alex Wann)	2024	Synchronicity	
"Veni Vidi Vici" (with Sara Landry)	2024	Spiritual Driveby	
"Odyssey" (with Dan Heath)	2025	Non-album single	
"s.o.s."	2025	Synchronicity	
"nocturnal"	2025	Synchronicity	

=== Remixes ===
List of remixes, showing year released, other performing artists, and originating album
Title	Year	Other Artist(s)	Album	Ref.
"Levitating" (Aaron Hibell Remix) [Mixed]	2022	Dua Lipa	Monastery of Sound (Mixtape, Vol. 1) [DJ Mix]	
"I Fall Apart" (Aaron Hibell Remix) [Mixed]	2022	Post Malone	Monastery of Sound (Mixtape, Vol. 1) [DJ Mix]	
"How Does It Feel" (Aaron Hibell Remix) [Mixed]	2022	London Grammar	Monastery of Sound (Mixtape, Vol. 1) [DJ Mix]	
"Late Night" (Aaron Hibell Remix) [Mixed]	2022	FOALS	Monastery of Sound (Mixtape, Vol. 1) [DJ Mix]	
"Don't Talk About It" (Aaron Hibell Remix) [Mixed]	2022	Tove Lo	Monastery of Sound (Mixtape, Vol. 1) [DJ Mix]	
"Solace" (Aaron Hibell Remix) [Mixed]	2022	RÜFÜS DU SOL	Monastery of Sound (Mixtape, Vol. 1) [DJ Mix]	
"Your Eyes" (Hibell Remix)	2022	Diplo, Ry X	Diplo (Deluxe)	
"Don't Forget My Love" (Aaron Hibell Remix)	2022	Diplo, Miguel	Non-album single	
"Human" (Aaron Hibell Remix)	2022	John Summit, Echoes	Non-album single	
"The Most Beautiful Boy" (Aaron Hibell Remix)	2023	The Irrepressibles, Felsmann + Tiley	Non-album single	
"Another Life" (Aaron Hibell Remix)	2023	Naomi Sharon	Monastery of Sound (Mixtape Vol. III)	
"All About That Bass" (started as a joke but actually kinda sick) [Aaron Hibell Remix]	2023	Meghan Trainor	Monastery of Sound (Mixtape Vol. III)	
"CHIHIRO" (Aaron Hibell Remix)	2024	Billie Eilish	Non-album single	
"Take Me by the Hand" (Aaron Hibell Remix)	2025	Oklou, Bladee	Choke Enough (Remixes)	
"Darkness In Me" (Aaron Hibell Remix)	2025	Steve Angello, Modern Tales	Non-album single	

== Accolades ==
In 2024, Aaron Hibell was listed on 1001 Tracklist of "The Future of Dance", which recognize artists that have played a huge part in the dance music scene over the year. Hibell was also included on Dancing Astronaut list for "Artists to Watch in 2025". SYNCHRONICITY

=== Listicles ===
Name of publisher, name of listicle, year(s) listed, and placement result
Publisher	Listicle	Year	Position	Ref.
1001 Tracklist	The Future of Dance 2024	2024	Listed	
Dancing Astronaut	Artists to Watch in 2025	2024	Listed	
EDM.com	The Best EDM Songs of 2024	2024	Listed ("Morning Light")	
EDM Identity	Artist to Watch in 2025	2025	Listed	
