= Oklou =

French musician (born 1993)

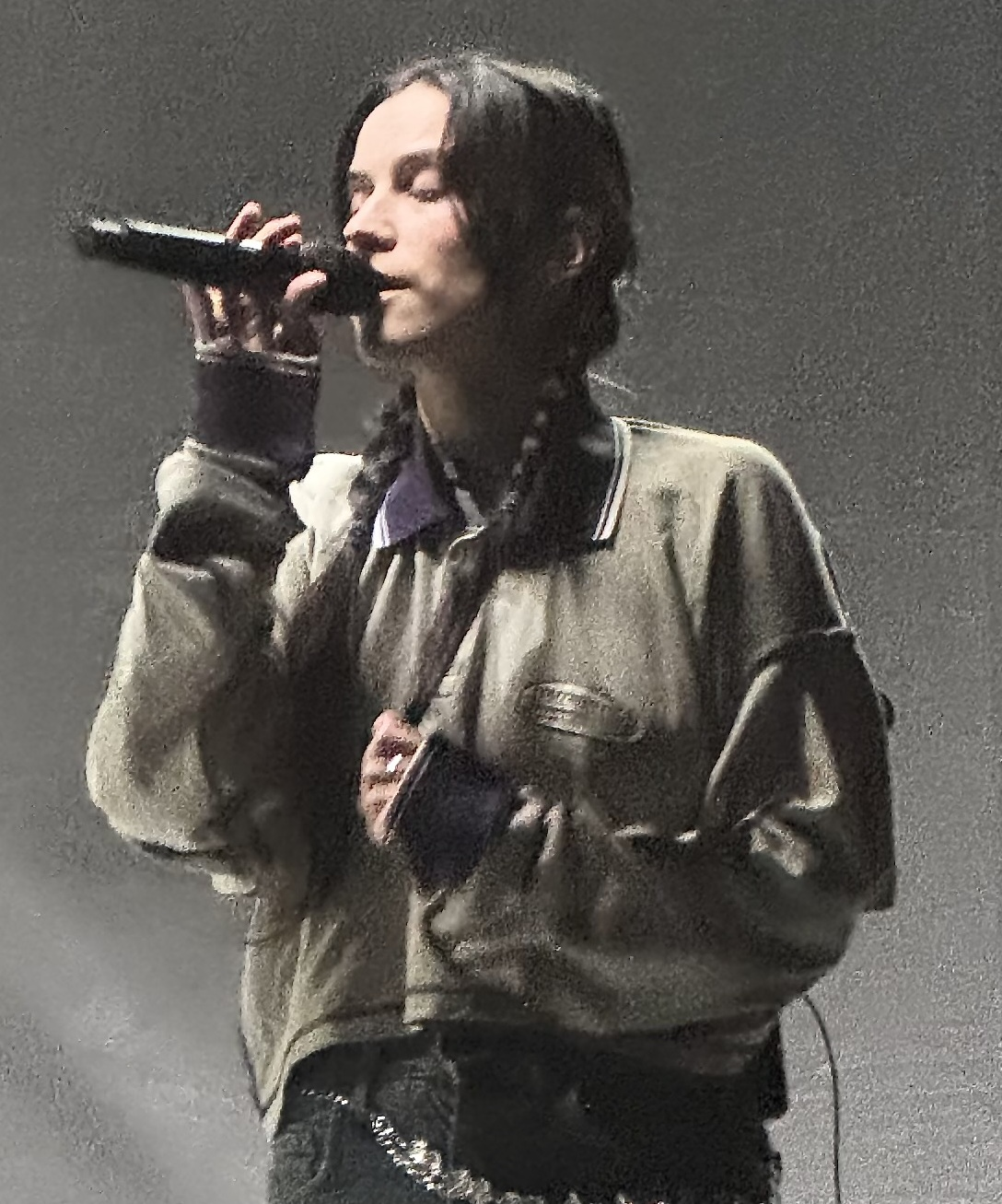
- Oklou performing at The Academy in 2025

Background information
- Also known as: Avril Alvarez; avril23; Lou du Lagon; Loumar; Soirée Pyj
- Born: Marylou Vanina Mayniel; 23 April 1993 (age 33); Poitiers, France
- Genres: Experimental pop; electropop
- Occupations: Musician; singer; music producer; DJ; songwriter
- Years active: 2014–present
- Labels: Because; TaP; True Panther; NUXXE; Permalnk
- Children: 1
- Website: oklou.com

Marylou Vanina Mayniel (born 23 April 1993), better known by her stage name Oklou (pronounced "Okay Lou"; /ˈoʊ.keɪ.ˈluː/), is a French musician from Poitiers. Her debut mixtape Galore was released in 2020, which was followed up by her debut album Choke Enough in 2025.

== Early life ==
Marylou Mayniel was born on 23 April 1993, in Poitiers, France. Mayniel grew up in the countryside of western France with her two parents and an older brother.

She was classically trained in piano and cello at a conservatory school and sang in choirs as a child. Her brother would bring home CDs from the local library, exposing her to artists such as Dälek. The first album she bought was by Gorillaz.

== Career ==
=== 2014–2019: Early beginnings ===
Mayniel began recording and uploading music online in 2013. She self-released her debut EP, Avril, in June 2014, under the moniker Loumar.

She moved to Paris in 2015, and self-released her first Oklou EP, First Tape, alongside a limited run of cassettes. After meeting in late 2015, Mayniel co-founded the female DJ collective TGAF (These Girls Are on Fiyah), alongside Malibu, DJ Ouai, Miley Serious, and Carin Kelly.They would play weekly radio shows on French station PIIAF and live shows around Paris. The group gained a notable following in its formative years, appearing in many online publication features. TGAF disbanded in July 2018. She attended a Red Bull Music Academy residency in Montreal in 2016, where she met Canadian musician and close collaborator Casey Manierka-Quaile.

Mayniel acted in the short film After School Knife Fight in 2017. The film received a festival release from 2017 to 2018. In December 2017, Mayniel released her collaborative EP with Casey MQ, titled For the Beasts. In early 2018, Mayniel became associated with record label and collective, NUXXE, and its co-founders, Irish-Chilean music producer Sega Bodega, British rapper Shygirl and French producer and performer Coucou Chloe. She released her third EP, The Rite of May, via the label in March of that year. Fact described the EP as “a deeply personal exploration of identity, intimacy and faith” set against “lush, experimental electronic production.” It featured collaborations with Sega Bodega, Rodaidh McDonald, Krampf and Bok Bok. Later that year, Mayniel and Krampf co-created the video game, Zone W/O People. It was made as a part of Red Bull Music Academy France's 2018 Diggin’ in the Carts event. Mayniel also produced a soundtrack for the game, which she later released on a limited cassette. Mayniel also appeared on the late American rapper Chynna’s October 2018 single "Xternal Locus".

Throughout 2019, Mayniel played at various festivals, such as Loom Festival and Pitchfork's Paris Music Festival. She also released a single, titled "Forever", via TaP Records in October. It was co-produced with Sega Bodega.

=== 2020–2023: Galore and collaborations ===
In January 2020, Mayniel released a collaborative single with French experimentalist Flavien Berger, titled "Toyota", via Because Music. This was followed by another single in February, titled "entertnmnt", which was co-produced with British producer Mura Masa, and another single in April, titled "SGSY" (standing for She's Gonna Slaughter You). The singles were released via TaP Records and True Panther Sounds.

Mayniel announced her debut mixtape Galore in July 2020, sharing three tracks, one of which, "unearth me", was accompanied by a music video. Another three tracks from the mixtape were released in August 2020, alongside a music video for the "god’s chariots" track. The full mixtape was released 24 September 2020, via Because Music, TaP Records and True Panther Sounds. The tape was made primarily in collaboration with Casey MQ, but also featured collaborations with Sega Bodega, Shygirl, PC Music’s A. G. Cook and EASYFUN, and GRADES. It also appeared on Gorilla vs. Bear, Rough Trade, and Dummy Mag’s 2020 year-end lists. Additionally in 2020, Mayniel released remixes of Caroline Polachek’s "Door", and Dua Lipa’s "Fever".

Mayniel produced a remix of French singer Pomme’s "les cours d’eau" track in January 2021, followed by a remix of Swedish rapper Bladee and producer Mechatok's "Rainbow" track in March 2021. Mayniel appeared on A. G. Cook's Apple vs. 7G remix album in May 2020, covering "Being Harsh" from Cook's 2020 7G album. She also released remixes of her tracks "fall" and "galore", by Cook. Mayniel toured across the US supporting Caroline Polachek from November through to December 2021. A remix EP celebrating Galore's anniversary was released on 13 October, featuring an extended mix of "asturias", and two remixes from Casey MQ, and Pomme & Danny L Harle.

She appeared on Flume's Palaces album in May 2022, on the song "Highest Building". She supported him on the album's tour through the United States.

=== 2024–present: Choke Enough ===
In 2024, Mayniel began talking about a potential new project, before releasing a first single "Family and Friends" in September 2024, accompanied by a music video directed by Gil Gharbi. This track also included additional vocals from Casey MQ, Cecile Believe and Zsela. Only a month later, in October 2024, a double A-side single containing the tracks "Obvious" and "Harvest Sky" was released, the latter of which featured Underscores, an American hyperpop artist. This was followed only a month later with a fourth promotional track titled "Choke Enough", accompanied by an announcement for an album of the same name, later released on February 7, 2025, on the French label Because Music. The singles "Take Me by the Hand" featuring Bladee, and "Blade Bird" were also released to promote the album.

The album charted in several countries, including France, Belgium, and the United Kingdom. The album was also critically well-received, with Pitchfork writing "the French electronic pop darling presents a twilit fusion of Y2K worship, Baroque polyphony, and elegant, opaque ambiance". Paste Magazine praised Mayniel for her use of field recordings and nostalgia-based musicianship.

In May 2025, she was announced as a supporting act for the Esch-sur-Alzette date on Lorde's Ultrasound World Tour, however the concert was postponed due to illness without Oklou as an opener for the rescheduled date.

In July 2025, Mayniel released remixes of select tracks from the album, featuring remixes by Jamesjamesjames, Malibu, Nick Léon Broward, and Aaron Hibell.

In October 2025, she released a song "Viscus" with British avant-pop musician FKA twigs. This was followed by an announcement of a deluxe edition of Choke Enough, titled Choke Enough: Expansion Pack. This version, released on October 30, 2025, featured four new songs, including "Viscus". In October 2025, it was also announced via X that Mayniel is featured on the remix of British pop singer-songwriter PinkPantheress's "Girl Like Me", appearing on the remix album Fancy Some More.

In November 2025, she released a single titled Crystallise My Tears with British music producer Danny L Harle and English singer MNEK.

In 2026, she was announced as a member of the 2026 Cannes Film Festival Critics' Week jury. In 2026, Mayniel performed at a series of music festivals, including Coachella, We Love Green, and Primavera Sound. Regarding the latter, Mayniel urged for better working conditions following adverse weather. Mayniel produced the score for the 2026 film In Waves with Robin Coudert (also known as ROB).

== Personal life ==
In a February 2025 interview with Stereogum, Mayniel revealed that she was pregnant. In June 2025, she announced the birth of her child.

== Awards and nominations ==
Award	Year	Nominee(s)	Category	Result	Ref.
Libera Awards	2026	choke enough	Record of the Year	Nominated	
Libera Awards	2026	choke enough	Best Dance/Electronic Record	Won	
Libera Awards	2026	choke enough	Best Pop Record	Won	
Libera Awards	2026	"blade bird" (Nick León Broward Mix)	Best Remix	Won	
Libera Awards	2026	"viscus" (with FKA Twigs)	Video of the Year	Won	
UK Music Video Awards	2026	"viscus" (with FKA Twigs)	Best Pop/R&B/Soul/Jazz Video – Newcomer	Pending	

== Discography ==
=== Albums ===
Title	Album details	Peak chart positions				
Title	Album details	FRA	BEL (FL)	BEL (WA)	UK	SCO
Choke Enough	Released: 7 February 2025; Label: Because Music, TaP Records, True Panther Sounds; Formats: LP, CD, cassette, digital download, streaming	80	80	161	83	12

=== Mixtapes ===
Title	Mixtape details
Galore	Released: 24 September 2020; Label: Because Music, TaP Records, True Panther Sounds; Formats: LP, CD, cassette, digital download, streaming

=== EPs ===
Title	EP details
Avril (as Loumar)	Released: 17 June 2014; Label: Self-released; Formats: Digital download, streaming
First Tape	Released: 23 November 2015; Label: Self-released; Formats: Digital download, cassette
For the Beasts (with Casey MQ)	Released: 6 December 2017; Label: Self-released; Formats: Digital download, streaming
The Rite of May	Released: 16 March 2018; Label: NUXXE; Formats: Digital download, streaming
Galore Anniversary	Released: 13 October 2021; Label: Because Music, TaP Records; Formats: Digital download, streaming

=== Singles ===
Title	Year	Album	Label
"Chrysalis"	2014	Avril	Self-released
"Friendless"	2018	The Rite of May	NUXXE
"They Can't Hear Me"	2018	The Rite of May	NUXXE
"Friendless" (Sega Bodega Piano Version)	2018	Non-album single	NUXXE
"Forever"	2019	Non-album single	Because Music; TaP Records
"Toyota"	2020	Non-album single	Because Music; TaP Records
"Entertnmnt"	2020	Non-album single	Because Music; TaP Records
"SGSY"	2020	Non-album single	Because Music; TaP Records
"Unearth Me"	2020	Galore	Because Music; TaP Records
"God's Chariots"	2020	Galore	Because Music; TaP Records
"Galore" (French Version) (with Pomme and Danny L Harle)	2021	Galore Anniversary	Because Music; TaP Records
"Family and Friends"	2024	Choke Enough	Because Music; TaP Records
"Harvest Sky" (featuring Underscores)	2024	Choke Enough	Because Music; TaP Records
"Obvious"	2024	Choke Enough	Because Music; TaP Records
"Choke Enough"	2024	Choke Enough	Because Music; TaP Records
"Take Me by the Hand" (featuring Bladee)	2025	Choke Enough	Because Music; TaP Records
"Blade Bird"	2025	Choke Enough	Because Music; TaP Records
"Viscus" (featuring FKA Twigs)	2025	Choke Enough (Deluxe)	Because Music; TaP Records

=== Remixes ===
Title	Artist(s)	Year
"Door"	Caroline Polachek	2020
"Fever"	Dua Lipa featuring Angèle	2020
"Les cours d'eau"	Pomme	2021
"Rainbow"	Bladee and Mechatok	2021
"Girl Like Me"	PinkPantheress	2025

=== Guest appearances ===
Title	Year	Artist(s)	Album
"Bloom Doom"	2016	John Vitesse	Club Hexagon, Vol. 1
"Haku"	2016	—N/a	Boss Rush
"Météo"	2018	Myth Syzer	Bisous
"Xternal Locus"	2018	Chynna	Non-album single
"Baby Gurl"	2018	Zuukou Mayzie	J.M.U.A.Z
"Raising Hell"	2020	Sega Bodega	Salvador
"Komodo"	2020	Sega Bodega	Reestablishing Connection
"Babygirl"	2020	Casey MQ	Babycasey
"Empty Lightning"	2021	Woesum	Blue Summer
"Being Harsh (Oklou Cover)"	2021	A. G. Cook	Apple vs. 7G
"Bunny"	2021	MISOGI	Non-album single
"What About Us (oklou's cover)"	2021	Casey MQ	Babycasey: Ultra
"☆"	2021	Namasenda	Unlimited Ammo
"Highest Building"	2022	Flume	Palaces
"Le Tombeau des lucioles"	2022	Zuukou Mayzie	Le film: le commencement
"The Make Believe"	2024	Casey MQ	Later that day, the day before, or the day before that
"Fast Asleep"	2026	Eartheater	Heavenly Body: If I'm the Bottle You're the Message

== Tours ==
=== Headlining ===
- 2025 Europe and US tour (2025)
- 2026 US tour (2026)

=== Supporting ===
- Caroline Polachek - Heart Is Unbreaking Tour (2021)
