= Choke Enough =

Studio album by Oklou
- Released: 7 February 2025
- Genres: Synth-pop; hyperpop; bedroom pop; hypnagogic pop; art pop
- Length: 35:44
- Labels: Because Music; True Panther
- Producers: Oklou; Casey MQ; Danny L Harle; A. G. Cook

Oklou chronology
| Galore Anniversary (2021) | Choke Enough (2025) |

Singles from Choke Enough
- 1. "Family and Friends" Released: 18 September 2024; 2. "Harvest Sky / Obvious" Released: 16 October 2024; 3. "Choke Enough" Released: 21 November 2024; 4. "Take Me by the Hand" Released: 15 January 2025; 5. "Blade Bird" Released: 5 February 2025; 6. "Viscus" Released: 9 October 2025

Choke Enough (stylised in lowercase) is the debut studio album by French musician, singer and producer Oklou. It released on 7 February 2025, via True Panther Sounds and Because Music. The album features guest appearances by Swedish rapper and singer Bladee, and American musician Underscores. It was supported by the singles "Family and Friends", "Harvest Sky", the title track, "Take Me by the Hand", and "Blade Bird", which was named The Fader's #1 song of the year. Choke Enough has received considerable critical acclaim, including being named as the best album of 2025 by Crack and Time Out, and as one of the best albums of the year by The New York Times, Pitchfork and The Fader.

== Background and recording ==
Similarly to her 2020 mixtape Galore, Choke Enough was made primarily in collaboration with Canadian musician Casey MQ. The album took Oklou two and a half years to finish, and explores "the quest of meaning". She stated:

Choke Enough is a very intense album for me. It's filled with directions, tentatives and irregularities, reflecting on my last years on this planet as my heart and conscience has really decentered from myself.

The album was primarily recorded in Paris, Los Angeles, and Cap Ferret.

== Release and promotion ==
Oklou released the album's first single, "Family and Friends", on 18 September 2024. She released "Harvest Sky" featuring Underscores and "Obvious" on 16 October 2024. She announced the album on 21 November 2024 and released its title track. She released "Take Me by the Hand" featuring Bladee as the album's fourth single on 15 January 2025. "Blade Bird", the album's fifth single, was released on 5 February 2025.

She announced a deluxe edition of the album, scheduled to release on 30 October 2025, on 8 October 2025 with the single "Viscus" featuring FKA Twigs.

=== Remixes ===
In December 2024, Oklou released two remixes of "Harvest Sky" with Underscores: the Danny L Harle C Mix and the Milkfish remix (a moniker of Underscores).

Oklou released a remix EP for the album on 25 June 2025 featuring remixes from producers Jamesjamesjames, Malibu, Nick Léon, and Aaron Hibell.

== Critical reception ==
Professional ratings
Aggregate scores
| Source | Rating |
|---|---|
| Metacritic | 84/100 |
Review scores
| Source | Rating |
| Paste | 8.8/10 |
| Pitchfork | 8.0/10 |
| The Skinny | 4/5 stars |
| Sputnikmusic | 3.6/5 |

Choke Enough has been met with acclaim from music critics. According to the review aggregator Metacritic, it received "universal acclaim" based on a weighted average score of 84 out of 100 from 6 critic scores.

Writing for Pitchfork, Walden Green described Choke Enough as a "foggy, twilit fusion of Y2K worship and medieval melodicism" and praised how it was "cognizant of music theory, historical context, and most importantly, motif," leading him to feel that it was "more formally compelling than it is viscerally moving." Paste's Matt Mitchell wrote that Oklou's references to grief, self-obsession, and neo-pagan rituals were only one layer to the project's "tabula rasa of tone poetry," noting that "its songs are sonorous, versatile and aim for intimacy rather than branding, cliché and casualness."

=== Year-end lists ===
| Publication | Accolade | Rank | Ref. |
|---|---|---|---|
| The Atlantic | The 10 Best Albums of 2025 | 2 | |
| BBC | The Best Albums of 2025 | 4 | |
| Billboard | The Best 50 Albums of 2025 | 41 | |
| Clash | Albums of the Year 2025 | 37 | |
| Crack | The Top 50 Albums of 2025 | 1 | |
| Dazed | The 20 best albums of 2025 | 2 | |
| Exclaim! | The Top 50 Albums of 2025 | 17 | |
| The Fader | The 50 Best Albums of 2025 | 20 | |
| The Forty-Five | The 45 Best Albums of 2025 | 11 | |
| The Guardian | The 50 Best Albums of 2025 | 30 | |
| The Line of Best Fit | The Best Albums of 2025 | 8 | |
| Loud and Quiet | Loud and Quiet Albums of the Year 2025 | 14 | |
| The New York Times | Best Albums of 2025 | 14 | |
| NME | The 50 Best Albums of 2025 | 6 | |
| NME | The 20 best debut albums of 2025 | —N/a | |
| Oor | Oor's 20 Best Albums of 2025 | 9 | |
| Paste | The 50 Best Albums of 2025 | 6 | |
| Paste | The 27 best debut albums of 2025 | 3 | |
| Rolling Stone | The 100 Best Albums of 2025 | 47 | |
| Pitchfork | The 50 Best Albums of 2025 | 4 | |
| The Skinny | The Skinny's Albums of 2025 | 3 | |
| Slant | The 50 Best Albums of 2025 | 16 | |
| Stereogum | Best Albums of 2025 | 3 | |
| Time Out | The 25 best albums of 2025 | 1 | |

== Track listing ==
| No. | Title | Writer(s) | Producer(s) | Length |
|---|---|---|---|---|
| 1. | "Endless" | Marylou Mayniel; Nate Campany; Danny L Harle; Casey Manierka-Quaile | Oklou; Casey MQ; Harle^{[a]} | 3:36 |
| 2. | "Thank You for Recording" | Mayniel; Caila Thompson-Hannant; Manierka-Quaile; Alexander Guy Cook | Oklou; Casey MQ; Cook | 2:57 |
| 3. | "Family and Friends" | Mayniel; Manierka-Quaile | Oklou; Casey MQ | 2:57 |
| 4. | "Obvious" | Mayniel; Thompson-Hannant; Manierka-Quaile | Oklou; Casey MQ | 2:16 |
| 5. | "ICT" | Mayniel; Manierka-Quaile; Cook | Oklou; Cook; Casey MQ | 3:28 |
| 6. | "Choke Enough" | Mayniel; Manierka-Quaile | Oklou; Casey MQ; Lucien Krampf^{[a]} | 4:00 |
| 7. | "(;´༎ຶٹ༎ຶ`)^{[b]}" | Mayniel; Leo Hoffsaes | Oklou | 0:48 |
| 8. | "Take Me by the Hand" (featuring Bladee) | Mayniel; Thompson-Hannant; Manierka-Quaile; Benjamin Reichwald | Oklou; Casey MQ; Harle^{[a]} | 2:52 |
| 9. | "Plague Dogs" | Mayniel; Manierka-Quaile | Oklou; Casey MQ | 1:46 |
| 10. | "Forces" | Mayniel; Manierka-Quaile | Oklou; Casey MQ | 1:05 |
| 11. | "Harvest Sky" (featuring Underscores) | Mayniel; Campany; April Harper Grey; Harle; Manierka-Quaile | Oklou; Harle; Casey MQ; Nick Léon^{[a]}; Underscores^{[a]} | 3:54 |
| 12. | "Want to Wanna Come Back" | Mayniel; Manierka-Quaile | Oklou; Casey MQ; Harle^{[a]} | 2:46 |
| 13. | "Blade Bird" | Mayniel; Campany; Manierka-Quaile | Oklou; Casey MQ | 3:19 |
| Total length: | | | | 35:44 |

Physical Release bonus track
| No. | Title | Length |
|---|---|---|
| 14. | "Unknown track (Bébé Lou)" | 2:43 |
| Total length: | | 40:23 ^{[c]} |

Choke Enough (Deluxe) track listing
| No. | Title | Writer(s) | Producer(s) | Length |
|---|---|---|---|---|
| 14. | "Viscus" (featuring FKA Twigs) | Mayniel; Harle; Manierka-Quaile; Tahliah Debrett Barnett | Oklou; Harle | 3:41 |
| 15. | "What's Good" | Mayniel | Oklou | 3:24 |
| 16. | "The Fishsong Unplugged" | Grey | Oklou; Florian Le Prise | 3:05 |
| 17. | "Dance 2" | Mayniel; Manierka-Quaile | Oklou; Sega Bodega | 4:52 |
| Total length: | | | | 50:46 |

Notes

- All tracks are stylised in all lowercase.
- ^{^[a]} signifies an additional producer.
- ^{^[b]}The title is pronounced “snif,” and for a brief period, it was even renamed as such on Spotify.
- ^{^[c]}There is a 1:56 minutes long silence between "Blade Bird" and "Bébé Lou", extending the album playtime to 40:23 minutes.

== Personnel ==
- Oklou – executive production, mixing (tracks 7, 10)
- Nathan A. Salon – saxophone (track 1)
- Casey MQ – vocal choir (track 3)
- Zsela – vocal choir (track 3)
- Cecile Believe – vocal choir (track 3)
- Lillian Mille – trumpet (track 4)
- Lucien Krampf – vocal engineering (track 6)
- Florian Le Prisé – guitar (track 13)
- Nathan Boddy – mixing (tracks 1–6, 8, 9, 11–13)
- Matt Colton – mastering
- Anthony Naples – Atmos mixing
- Gil Gharbi – photography
- Florian Solin – photography
- Kim Coussée – artwork

== Charts ==
Chart performance for Choke Enough
| Chart (2025) | Peak position |
|---|---|
| Belgian Albums (Ultratop Flanders) | 80 |
| Belgian Albums (Ultratop Wallonia) | 161 |
| French Albums (SNEP) | 80 |
| Scottish Albums (Official Charts) | 12 |
| UK Albums (Official Charts) | 83 |
| UK Independent Albums (Official Charts) | 4 |
