= Barbara Braccini =

French musician (born 1994)

Malibu
- Born: Barbara Braccini; November 9, 1994 (age 32); Pau, France
- Genres: ambient; sound collage
- Years active: 2015–present
- Label: YEAR0001

Barbara Braccini (born 9 November 1994), known professionally as Malibu, is a French musician, artist and voice-actress from Pau. She works primarily within ambient and experimental electronic music.

== Life and career ==
Barbara Braccini was born in Pau, France and grew up in a musical household. Her father was a jazz pianist and her mother taught music theory. She grew up in France and Angola during her early teenagehood. She later studied music theory at a French conservatory. In interviews, Braccini has described the conservatory environment as rigid, which contributed to a temporary disengagement from music.

After completing secondary education, Braccini studied cinema at the university in Bordeaux and became involved with a community of artists experimenting with synthesizers. During this period, she formed a close friendship with French artist Oklou that drew her back to music, spending many nights exploring electronic sounds on a MIDI keyboard connected to a Roland expander. The two had formed a now inactive band called Faro, and later collaborated on multiple projects, including a remix by Braccini for Oklou's album Choke Enough.

Braccini began releasing music online in the mid-2010s, primarily through SoundCloud, under several aliases. As belmont girl, she produces loop-based electronic reinterpretations of pop songs and as dj lostboi she focuses on a more euphoric, heavenly production.

In 2016, she attended the Red Bull Music Academy in Montreal.

In October of 2016, she hosted the first episode of United in Flames, a monthly radio show on Radar Radio, shortly after moved to Montreal-based online radio n10.as. In 2020, the show moved to NTS Radio, where it is accessible today. The episodes consist of sonic collages that center around ambient, ambient trance, downtempo and electronica tracks but often also include scenes from movies, pop or dance music, and internet memes, creating a highly cinematic sound landscape.

Her first widely recognised release appeared in 2017 on Mono No Aware, a compilation released by the Berlin-based label PAN. Her track "Held" introduced her work to a broader audience.

In 2019, Braccini released her debut EP, One Life, through UNO NYC and Joyful Noise Recordings. The five track mini-LP further showcased her affinity for atmospheric vocals and enchanting synths.

In 2021, Braccini released One Life: Four Remixes, featuring contributions from Julianna Barwick, John Beltran, Kelly Moran and Evian Christ.

She released her second EP Palaces of Pity in 2022. The EP explores the themes of loss and grief accompanied by oceanic photography by Madeira-born photographer Igor Pjörrt and was supported by the single "Atlantic Diva".

In 2024, Braccini collaborated with Swedish artist Merely on Essential Mixtape, recorded on a roadtrip in the south of Sweden, during her time living in Stockholm and released through the Stockholm-based label YEAR0001.

In 2025, she released her debut studio album Vanities on YEAR0001. The album was supported by the singles "Spicy City" and "So Sweet & Willing".

She has played in venues such as Southbank Center, the Barbican Centre, C2C Festival, Knockdown Center, Primavera Sound, Gaîté Lyrique, Kraftwerk (Berlin Atonal), and Café del Mar.

Beyond her solo work, Braccini has contributed voice acting and sound work to animated films directed by Caroline Poggi and Jonathan Vinel. She is also frequently collaborating with visual artist Igor Pjörrt, who has photographed her artworks, press images and directed the music video for "Spicy City".

She has appeared as a featured vocalist on tracks by British cellist and composer Oliver Coates, including "Apparition" and "Soaring X" and has been credited with production work for artists such as Bladee, Torus, Skrillex, Thaiboy Digital, Eurohead, Namasenda.

In May 2026, she contributed a remix of a song "Saturn's Return" to the remix album Midnight Sun: Girls Trip by Zara Larsson.

In October 2026, Braccini got signed to Warp Publishing.

To mark the anniversary of her debut album, Malibu released Vanities (Extended) in November 2026, featuring remix contributions from Bambinodj, Gigi Masin, TTristana, Mascara, The Future Sound of London and Oklou.

In November 2026, she celebrated the 10th anniversary of her acclaimed United in Flames show on NTS radio.

== Discography ==
- One Life (EP, 2019)
- Palaces Of Pity (EP, 2022)
- Essential Mixtape (mixtape, with Merely, 2024)
- Vanities (album, 2025)
