= Booger (film) =

2023 American film by Mary Dauterman

- Theatrical release poster
- Directed by: Mary Dauterman
- Written by: Mary Dauterman
- Produced by: Lexi Tannenholtz
- Starring: Grace Glowicki; Garrick Bernard; Heather Matarazzo; Marcia DeBonis
- Cinematography: Kenny Suleimanagich
- Edited by: Kyle Moriarty
- Music by: Zoe Polanski
- Production companies: Neon Heart Productions; Ley Line Entertainment; Sanctuary Content; One Two Twenty Entertainment
- Distributed by: Dark Sky Films
- Release dates: July 24, 2023 (Fantastic Fest); September 13, 2024 (United States)
- Running time: 78 minutes
- Country: United States
- Language: English

Booger is a 2023 American body horror comedy film written and directed by Mary Dauterman in her feature directorial debut. It stars Grace Glowicki, Garrick Bernard, Heather Matarazzo, and Marcia DeBonis. The film follows Anna (Glowicki), who, while grieving the unexpected death of her best friend and roommate Izzy (Sofia Dobrushin), is bitten by their runaway cat Booger, causing Anna to undergo an unusual bodily transformation.

Booger had its world premiere at the Fantasia International Film Festival on July 24, 2023, as part of the festival's "Underground" section. The film was received a limited theatrical release and be released on video-on-demand (VOD) on September 13, 2024.

== Cast ==
- Grace Glowicki as Anna
- Garrick Bernard as Max
- Heather Matarazzo as Ellen
- Marcia DeBonis as Joyce
- Richard Perez as Devon
- David Rysdahl as Snake
- Jenny Donheiser as Monty's Mom
- Ericka Page as Bartender
- Kayden Soares Da Silva as Memorial Attendee

== Production ==
Booger marks Dauterman's feature directorial debut; prior to Booger, Dauterman directed such short films as Wakey, Wakey (2019) and Unfinished Business (2020), the former of which screened at the Fantasia International Film Festival and Fantastic Fest in 2019. Dauterman described Booger as "a disgusting comedy about grief. Or a body horror that's funny and sad. Or a tragedy that makes you laugh and squirm. It's the nuanced story I wanted to tell about the joys of friendship, the pain of loss, and the dizzying search back to your center after a crisis."

== Release ==
Booger had its world premiere at the Fantasia International Film Festival in Montreal, Quebec, Canada, on July 24, 2023, as part of the festival's "Underground" section. A second screening at the festival followed on July 26. In February 2024, it was announced that Dark Sky Films had acquired the US distribution rights to Booger. The film was released in limited theaters and on video-on-demand (VOD) on September 13, 2024.

== Reception ==
=== Critical response ===
On the review aggregator website Rotten Tomatoes, 97% of 29 critics' reviews are positive. The website's consensus reads: "With gross-out flair and a strangely empathetic emotional core, Booger delivers a visceral, yet heartfelt take on grief and friendship."

J Hurtado of Screen Anarchy praised Dauterman's direction and Glowicki's performance, writing, "There are endless films and stories about grief, but none of them are like this one, and I have to assume that very few feature this number of graphic scenes of a human woman coughing up hairballs." Collider's Maggie Lovitt gave the film a grade of "B+", calling it "a bold and refreshing journey into grief and the damaging effects of holding it in when it desperately wants to claw its way out."

Emily Gagne of Dread Central gave the film three out of five stars, complimenting Glowicki's performance while desiring to know more about the character of Izzy; Gagne concluded: "Like picking your nose, Booger is a film that will work for some and make others wholly uncomfortable." Nick Allen, writing for RogerEbert.com, described the film's story as "too slack, even for 75 minutes of movie", and concluded: "Booger could stand to have more going on as a character study, but the movie does have promise for Dauterman's animalistic cinema."

=== Accolades ===
The film was nominated for "Best Narrative Feature" at the 2024 Florida Film Festival.
