= Ticket to Paradise (2022 film) =

Film by Ol Parker

- Theatrical release poster
- Directed by: Ol Parker
- Written by: Ol Parker; Daniel Pipski
- Produced by: Tim Bevan; Eric Fellner; Sarah Harvey; Deborah Balderstone
- Starring: George Clooney; Julia Roberts; Kaitlyn Dever; Maxime Bouttier; Billie Lourd; Lucas Bravo
- Cinematography: Ole Birkeland
- Edited by: Peter Lambert
- Music by: Lorne Balfe
- Production companies: Working Title Films; Smokehouse Pictures; Red Om Films
- Distributed by: Universal Pictures
- Release dates: September 8, 2022 (Spain); September 20, 2022 (United Kingdom); October 21, 2022 (United States)
- Running time: 104 minutes
- Countries: Australia; United Kingdom; United States
- Language: English
- Budget: $60 million
- Box office: $169.6 million

Ticket to Paradise is a 2022 romantic comedy film starring George Clooney and Julia Roberts as a divorced couple who team up to sabotage the impending wedding of their daughter in Bali. The film is directed by Ol Parker and written by Parker and Daniel Pipski, while Kaitlyn Dever, Billie Lourd, Maxime Bouttier, and Lucas Bravo also star.

Long divorced acrimonious couple David and Georgia Cotton travel to Bali as a team to prevent their newly-graduated from law school daughter Lily from marrying, which they see as the same mistake they made 25 years ago.

Ticket to Paradise had its world premiere in Spain on September 8, 2022, and was released in the United Kingdom on September 20 and in the United States on October 21, by Universal Pictures and Working Title Films. It grossed $168 million worldwide and received mixed reviews from critics.

== Plot ==
David and Georgia Cotton are a divorced couple who hate each other and regret their marriage, which ended 20 years earlier. Their daughter Lily graduates from college, and goes on vacation to Bali with her friend and fellow graduate Wren.

While snorkeling off the coast, the pair's tour boat leaves them behind, and they are rescued by a young Balinese seaweed farmer Gede. That night, Lily and he hit it off.

A month later, Lily emails David and Georgia to let them know that she and Gede are getting married and are staying in Bali permanently, giving up her legal career before it begins. Her parents form a truce to try and convince her she is rushing into things and making the same mistake they did. Their pilot on the flight to Bali turns out to be Paul, Georgia's boyfriend, who arranged to work this flight, and plans to return to Bali a few days later.

David and Georgia publicly give their verbal blessing to Lily and Gede, but secretly plan a "Trojan horse" strategy to sabotage the wedding from within. Their scheme includes stealing the couple's blessed wedding rings, which the couple quickly replace. Gede immediately suspects David and Georgia, but hides his suspicions from Lily.

While carrying out this plan, David and Georgia begin to mend fences with each other. They also get to know Gede and his large extended family and see that he really cares for Lily. Paul shows up and surprises Georgia with a series of marriage proposals, the first of which is interrupted by a snake bite at the temple of Tanah Lot, and the second is prevented by an accidental head-butt.

Stranded with Gede and her parents, Lily finds the rings in Georgia's bag. She demands her parents either approve of the marriage or go home. Lily also confronts Gede, who simultaneously confesses his harbored suspicions toward David and Georgia stealing the rings.

After a night in the forest, David and Georgia toy with romance again. They even kiss each other once, before pulling away and laughing about it. David and Georgia realize that they will lose Lily forever if they do not support her decision, so they offer their support.

The wedding proceeds in accordance with Balinese custom. As the couple prepares to ceremonially stab a dagger through a pandan-leaf mat to complete the bond of marriage, Gede pauses the ceremony to ask David and Georgia to give their blessing sincerely this time, offering not to go through with it unless they agree.

David stands up and says the couple has their blessing, but that they do not really need it, and if he and Georgia had listened to all of their own detractors (David's friends and Georgia's parents, respectively), they never would have had Lily. Despite how their marriage turned out, they are both happier in a world with Lily in it. Lily and Gede are touched, complete the ceremony, becoming married.

On the morning after the wedding, Georgia tells Paul that she cannot marry him, and they end their relationship. David, Georgia and Wren exchange tearful goodbyes with Lily before boarding a boat to leave.

David and Georgia consider their romantic prospects again, debating aloud whether they are too old to feel young again and when they might return to Bali. In a flash, they hold hands, simultaneously jumping off the boat straight into the water to return to the dock.

== Cast ==
- George Clooney as David Cotton
- Julia Roberts as Georgia Cotton
- Kaitlyn Dever as Lily Cotton
- Billie Lourd as Wren Butler
- Maxime Bouttier as Gede May
- Lucas Bravo as Paul
- Agung Pindha as Wayan May
- Ifa Barry as Suli May
- Cintya Dharmayanti as Losi May

== Production ==
=== Development and casting ===
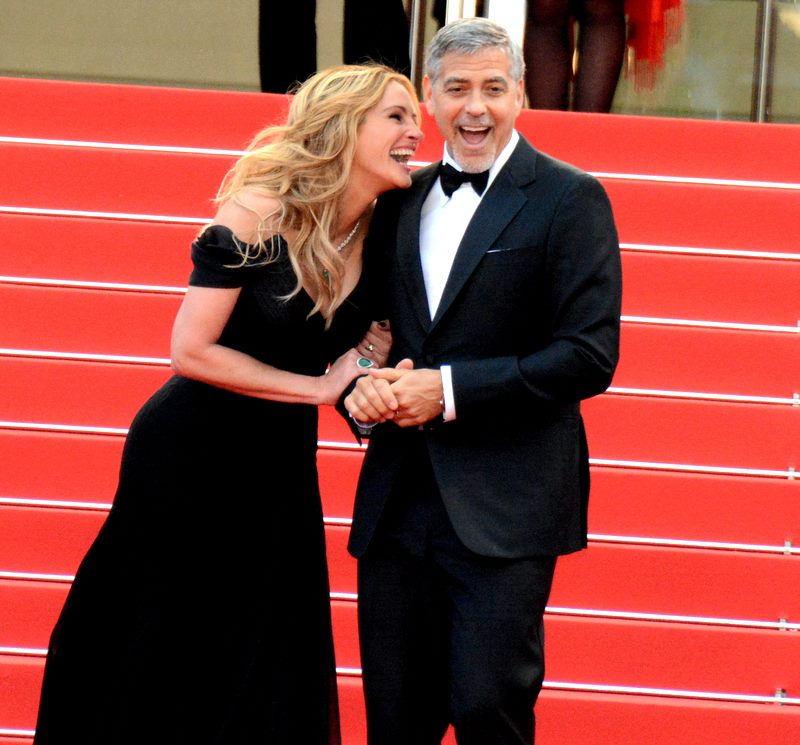
George Clooney and Julia Roberts (seen here in 2016) star as a divorced couple in Ticket to Paradise.

Ticket to Paradise is a co-production between Working Title Films, Smokehouse Pictures, and Red Om Films. Ol Parker and Daniel Pipski wrote the screenplay, and Parker directed. The film was announced by Universal Pictures on February 26, 2021. It reunites actors George Clooney and Julia Roberts after previously working on Ocean's Eleven (2001), Confessions of a Dangerous Mind (2002), Ocean's Twelve (2004), and Money Monster (2016). Deadline Hollywood noted Universal's reluctance to sell the distributor rights to a streaming service in the midst of the COVID-19 pandemic and said it was "important to those wondering when film studios are going to stop selling pricey star packages to streamers". Billie Lourd joined the cast in March; Kaitlyn Dever was added to the cast in April; and Lucas Bravo was revealed to star in October. Clooney used a Keto-based regimen to lose weight in preparation for his role. Richard Curtis and Theodore Melfi performed uncredited rewrites on the script.

=== Filming ===
Principal photography took place in Queensland, Australia, between November 2021 and February 2022. Ole Bratt Birkeland was the cinematographer. The film received a grant of AU$6.4 million (US$4.92 million) from the Australian federal government. Paul Fletcher, the Australian Minister for Communications and the Arts, said the production generated at least 270 jobs and AU$47 million (US$36.2 million) for the local economy. Filming locations included the Whitsunday Islands, the HOTA gallery at the Gold Coast, Brisbane Airport, cane fields near Norwell, Tamborine National Park, Queen's Wharf, Brisbane, Hamilton Island Airport, Carrara Markets, Tangalooma Island Resort on Moreton Island, and the Palm Bay Resort on Long Island. Scene where Georgia and David come to the island was shot on the Kate's cove beach, Haslewood Island. Production was briefly put in hiatus in January 2022 due to the rise of COVID-19 cases in Queensland. Filming concluded on 18 February 2022.

=== Music ===
Ticket to Paradise (Original Motion Picture Soundtrack)

Film score by Lorne Balfe
- Released: September 23, 2022
- Length: 25:19
- Label: Back Lot Music

Lorne Balfe chronology
Black Adam (2022)	Ticket to Paradise (Original Motion Picture Soundtrack) (2022)	Dungeons and Dragons: Honor Among Thieves (2023)

During post-production, Lorne Balfe composed the film's score. Back Lot Music released the soundtrack on September 23, 2022

=== Track listing ===
No.	Title	Length
1.	"Sweet Sunrise"	2:27
2.	"Mountain Kiss"	2:18
3.	"Flying Kites"	1:13
4.	"Ampura"	2:24
5.	"Remember Me"	2:23
6.	"Dolphin Spirit"	2:01
7.	"Views from Bayview"	2:20
8.	"Cleansing the Soul"	2:02
9.	"The Morning After"	2:36
10.	"Ticket to Paradise"	3:02
11.	"We're in This Together"	2:33
Total length:		25:19

== Release ==
Universal Pictures released the film theatrically in Australia on September 15, 2022. It was released in the United Kingdom on September 20, 2022, and was released in the United States on October 21, 2022. It was originally set to be released in the US on September 30, 2022. The death of Queen Elizabeth II in September 2022 delayed the film's UK release from September 16 to September 20. The film began streaming on Peacock 45 days after its theatrical debut in the US.

=== Home media ===
The film was released for VOD platforms on November 8, 2022, followed by a Blu-ray and DVD on December 13, 2022.

== Reception ==
=== Box office ===
Ticket to Paradise grossed $68.3 million in the United States and Canada, and $100.3 million in other territories, for a worldwide total of $168.6 million, against a budget of $60 million, making it a box office success.

In the United States and Canada, Ticket to Paradise was released alongside Black Adam, and was projected to gross $12–15 million from 3,500 theaters in its opening weekend. It went on to debut to $16.5 million, finishing second to Black Adam, with the slight over-performance attributed to skewing to older women amid the release of Black Adam (and Halloween Ends) being aimed at young men. The film remained in the Top 10 at the box office for seven consecutive weeks.

The film opened in seven markets ahead of its US release, grossing $800,000 from Spain and $700,000 from Brazil over their opening weekends on September 9–11.

=== Critical response ===
On the review aggregator website Rotten Tomatoes, 56% of 227 critics' reviews are positive, with an average rating of 5.6/10. The website's consensus reads: "Ticket to Paradise may not send viewers all the way to the promised land, but this reunion for a pair of megawatt stars is still an agreeably frothy good time." Metacritic, which uses a weighted average, assigned the film a score of 50 out of 100, based on 47 critics, indicating "mixed or average" reviews. Audiences polled by CinemaScore gave the film an average grade of "A-" on an A+ to F scale.

=== Accolades ===
At the 2022 People's Choice Awards, the film was nominated for Comedy Movie of 2022, and Roberts was nominated for Comedy Movie Star of 2022.
