= Dungeons & Dragons: Honor Among Thieves (soundtrack) =

2023 film score by Lorne Balfe

Dungeons & Dragons: Honor Among Thieves (Music from the Motion Picture)

Film score by Lorne Balfe
- Released: March 31, 2023
- Recorded: October 2022–January 2023
- Genre: Film score
- Length: 90:17
- Label: Mercury Classics
- Producer: Lorne Balfe

Lorne Balfe chronology
Ticket to Paradise (2022)	Dungeons & Dragons: Honor Among Thieves (2023)	Tetris (2023)

Singles from Dungeons & Dragons: Honor Among Thieves (Music from the Motion Picture)
- 1. "Wings of Time" Released: March 10, 2023

Dungeons & Dragons: Honor Among Thieves (Music from the Motion Picture) is the soundtrack to the 2023 film Dungeons & Dragons: Honor Among Thieves, based on the tabletop role-playing game Dungeons & Dragons. Composed by Lorne Balfe, the original score comprises 49 score cues running for over 90 minutes and was released by Mercury Classics through digital platforms on March 31, 2023. The track "Wings of Time" (performed by Tame Impala) was released three weeks ahead of the film as the album's lead single, and is used in the film as the ending credits song.

== Background ==
In July 2022, Lorne Balfe was announced as the music composer for the film. In an interview to ComicBook.com, Balfe recalled that: "I used to play Dungeons, so when I heard they were making that, I knew I wanted to be part of the team. Because that was my memory as a child, playing it. So that's fun. And that's in that realm of – they are superheroes. That'll be a fun movie." He added that the score is filled with delicate mystical Celtic journeys mixed with the large cinematic lush orchestra, which helped him to go back to his Scottish roots for the film's score.

The film features the original song, "Wings of Time" released on March 10, 2023. It is performed by Australian musician Kevin Parker, the frontman of the psychedelic music project Tame Impala and co-written by Nick Allbrook. Parker said that "Being asked to do a track for the D&D soundtrack seemed like an unmissable opportunity to indulge in my long time love of fantasy prog rock". His collaboration with Allbrook had helped him rent a villa in Spain for two nights during a tour for Primavera Sound music festival, and as the villa had a look of a castle, he thought that the location got in the right frame of mind and it went from there, allowing weird ideas and song lyrics. On March 19, Chris Pine and Michelle Rodriguez revealed that the track "l'Emprise" appearing on Mylène Farmer's eponymous album will feature in the end-credits of the song in French-speaking countries.

The 49-track score album was released on March 31, 2023 on the same day of its release by Mercury Classics Soundtracks & Scores label.

== Track listing ==
No.	Title	Length
1.	"I Wasn't Always a Thief"	0:58
2.	"Finding Zia"	1:36
3.	"Thick as Thieves"	2:59
4.	"Korrin's Keep"	2:23
5.	"Escape the Tower"	0:45
6.	"Dungeons and Dragons"	1:35
7.	"Journey to Neverwinter"	1:04
8.	"Reunited with Kira"	1:08
9.	"Forge Begins"	0:44
10.	"Sofina Starts"	0:25
11.	"That's Why You Came Back"	1:29
12.	"Into the Floor"	1:58
13.	"Execution Escape"	0:49
14.	"Be Gone"	1:29
15.	"Magic Show Melee"	1:16
16.	"Owl Bear"	1:38
17.	"Doric's Story"	0:50
18.	"Szass Tam's Story"	0:52
19.	"Wizardry"	1:46
20.	"Gwynn"	1:07
21.	"Down at the Cemetery"	4:23
22.	"Xenk"	1:16
23.	"Thayan Flahback"	1:30
24.	"Swear to It"	1:22
25.	"The Underdark"	3:11
26.	"Unlock the Helmet"	1:38
27.	"The Ruckus"	1:43
28.	"Themberchaud"	2:37
29.	"Trapped"	1:29
30.	"Swim to the Beach"	0:38
31.	"Goodbye Xenk"	0:50
32.	"Helmet Attuning"	1:20
33.	"Remembering You"	1:08
34.	"Never Stop Failing"	3:10
35.	"The Heist"	2:32
36.	"Forge's Speech"	1:42
37.	"Into the Castle"	2:25
38.	"Simon Does It"	2:04
39.	"Sofina's Trickery"	2:48
40.	"Entering the Arena"	1:55
41.	"The Maze"	4:58
42.	"Beneath the Maze"	1:14
43.	"Sorry Forge"	2:43
44.	"Turn the Ship Around"	3:22
45.	"Final Battle"	4:13
46.	"Fallen Foe"	0:45
47.	"A Red Wizard's Blade"	3:30
48.	"The Reawakening"	1:29
49.	"Forge's Tale"	1:31
50.	"Wings of Time" (written by Kevin Parker and Nick Allbrook; performed by Tame Impala)	2:48
Total length:		90:17

== Reception ==
Lorne Balfe's score received positive reviews from critics. Nikki Baughan of Screen International and Helen O'Hara of Empire compared it to the likes of Lord of the Rings and Game of Thrones music. Baughan felt that the score "is at its most effective during the sequences when the foursome really start pulling together, the bombast of orchestral sounds given extra weight by an urgent, spine-tingling chorus of human voices." Marisa Mirabal of IndieWire wrote "Lorne Balfe heightens the tension with a unique mixture of verbal chanting and rhythmic beats that properly enhance the meticulous stuntwork. The score morphs into a creature of its own and is unlike the soothing, sweeping scores of other fantasy films. Balfe also successfully leans into the bard lore of Pine’s character by composing songs that are light-hearted, poetic, and heavy with string instruments." Kate Stables of GamesRadar+ wrote "Celtic-tinged music score that Frodo would feel right at home with". J. Don Birnam of BTL News wrote "Lorne Balfe creates a magnificent little soundtrack that perfectly captures the playful overtones of the movie and its nerdy, fantastical elements." James Vernier of Boston Herald felt that the score "hits the right balance of serious and play".

Filmtracks.com wrote "the score for Dungeons & Dragons: Honor Among Thieves serves the film well enough to recommend, with sufficient highlights to combine into a vaguely Celtic adventure suite. But be careful when you approach this score on album. At over 90 minutes in length, the score-only presentation is slowed by incidental cues of little value, not to mention the full slate of really obnoxious action material. On the other hand, all the snippets of the score's alluring lyrical highlights can be assembled apart from the detractions. High resolution options for the score do illuminate the creative percussive elements and Celtic-flavored soloists, but this benefit dwindles once electronic manipulation and other enhancements ruin the soundscape. This music owes much to Shore and Powell when not regurgitating Balfe's basic action fare, its lovely melodic portions for secondary themes compensating for an otherwise decent but uninspiring adventure narrative. Prepare your best culling strategy for this one." Jonathan Broxton called it as "a fun score, entertaining and engaging, with plenty of bold action, appropriate emotion, and fascinating sonic ideas". In a negative review, Kush Bansal of The Daily Free Press found the score "never compelling beyond the generic medieval adventure music".

== Book of the Bard ==
Book of the Bard (Music Inspired by Dungeons & Dragons: Honor Among Thieves)

Film score by Lorne Balfe
- Released: June 23, 2023
- Genre: Film score
- Length: 38:56
- Label: Paramount Music

A companion album was released on June 23, 2023 with 14 songs inspired by the world of Taverns in Dungeons & Dragons, written by Lorne Balfe with directors Jonathan Goldstein and John Francis Daley.

No.	Title	Length
1.	"Finn's Boy"	2:06
2.	"Lads and Lasses"	2:01
3.	"The Nine Hells"	2:09
4.	"Free Kenku"	2:11
5.	"Juice of the Vine"	3:10
6.	"Oak's Tale"	3:13
7.	"Beerzerk"	2:58
8.	"Sweet Emerald Love"	3:36
9.	"Drowing in the Jar"	2:49
10.	"Lasses and Lads"	3:43
11.	"The Dragons Breath"	2:33
12.	"The Warden"	3:55
13.	"Benjamin and Leopold"	2:05
14.	"I Measc na Laochra (Amongst the Warriors) [feat. Róisín Seoighe and Kneecap]"	2:27

== The Dungeon Master's Jukebox ==
The Dungeon Master's Jukebox (Music Inspired by Dungeons & Dragons: Honor Among Thieves)

Film score by Lorne Balfe
- Released: July 28, 2023
- Genre: Film score
- Length: 33:02
- Label: Mercury Classics

A second companion album was released on July 28, 2023 with 10 songs inspired by the film, written by Lorne Balfe before filming started based on the script and storyboards.

No.	Title	Length
1.	"Holga Kilgore"	5:07
2.	"Edgin’s Journey"	2:14
3.	"Xenk Yendar"	2:18
4.	"Doric’s Theme"	3:28
5.	"Friendship Forged"	5:17
6.	"The Red Wizard"	4:06
7.	"The Gang"	3:43
8.	"Homelands"	2:23
9.	"Kira’s Theme"	1:48
10.	"Holga’s Pride"	2:38
