= Black Adam (soundtrack) =

Black Adam (Original Motion Picture Soundtrack)

Film score by Lorne Balfe
- Released: October 21, 2022
- Genre: Film score
- Length: 109:00
- Label: WaterTower Music
- Producer: Lorne Balfe

Lorne Balfe chronology
Secret Headquarters (2022)	Black Adam (2022)	Ticket to Paradise (2022)

Singles from Black Adam (Original Motion Picture Soundtrack)
- 1. "Black Adam Theme" Released: September 30, 2022; 2. "The Justice Society Theme" Released: October 5, 2022

Black Adam (Original Motion Picture Soundtrack) is the score album composed by Lorne Balfe, for the 2022 film Black Adam, based on the DC Comics character of the same name. The album features 43 tracks and was released by WaterTower Music on October 21, 2022. It was preceded by two singles – Black Adam and the Justice Society's themes, released on September 30 and October 5, respectively.

== Development ==
The film marked Lorne Balfe's first composition for a live-action DC film and his first film in the DC Extended Universe (DCEU) after previously writing additional music and assisting Hans Zimmer on Christopher Nolan's The Dark Knight trilogy, and scoring The Lego Batman Movie (2017), an animated film based on the DC comics character Batman, although not a DCEU film. He also scored for Marvel Studios' Black Widow (2021), based on the Marvel Comics character of the same name. Balfe revealed the biggest thing that "uniquely appealed him" on Black Adam was the creative team involved — director Jaume Collet-Serra, producer Beau Flynn and executive producer Hiram Garcia — as he felt "you choose your projects because of the team, and not the scripts. Because the scripts change" and further added "I've been on films where the characters' names have changed, and the countries have changed. So, don't rely too much on that." They collaborated remotely through Zoom in the pre-production, due to COVID-19 pandemic.

The score for Black Adam was mostly inspired from Dwayne Johnson's off-screen and on-screen persona, as his characterisation is also a "part of the theme". Balfe thought of a marching football team band, for writing the Black Adam theme, inspiring Johnson's early-days of his sports career as a football player. He knew a band music is quite difficult due to "becoming patriotic and old-fashioned", hence he wanted to feel it as "a commercial track that you literally feel that you've heard before", due to the nature of the fanfare. He wanted a high school marching band to produce that theme, but could not do so due to their school vacation. The Black Adam theme was originally a longer theme, and was much "overcomplicated", which Balfe altered it to suit the commercial sensibilities. Balfe described the theme as "a pop song sans the lyrics". He also created a father-son theme for Black Adam and his son.

Balfe wanted each characters have their own themes, but after getting introduced to five other characters, he felt it as "complicated" and wanted it to look for a bigger arc, and as those individual characters were looked as part of the Society, "being a unit and working as a team", which resulted in the Justice Society theme. He said "I really wanted to try to make a theme for them that you felt was very nostalgic. [Like it] had been part of a TV show in the 1950s, for example. So it was very, very old-fashioned. It's that pomp and circumstance, fanfare, very [Johannes] Brahms and [Edward] Elgar, but with a contemporary beat to it, so that the audience felt, 'Oh, well, we know these characters' even though a lot won't."

Balfe experimented with the score by "matching the epic-ness of an orchestra" with contemporary beats. The scoring session included large brass section, French horns, trumpets, trombones, tubas, violins. Johnson had visited the recording sessions of the score at Eastwood Scoring Stage, saying "[It's very rare that] you get the stars and the producers wanting to come to recording sessions. He came, and it was his first ever recording session that he'd been to. It was fantastic. He went, and he talked to the orchestra, and they played the theme for him. That was very special, seeing that."

== Track listing ==
All music is composed by Lorne Balfe.

Black Adam (Original Motion Picture Soundtrack)
No.	Title	Length
1.	"Teth-Adam"	3:33
2.	"Kahndaq"	6:09
3.	"The Awakening"	3:04
4.	"The Revolution Starts"	1:29
5.	"Introducing the JSA"	4:41
6.	"Shaza-Superman"	2:23
7.	"Our Only Hope"	2:06
8.	"Change Your Name"	1:27
9.	"What Kind of Magic?"	2:10
10.	"Is It the Champion?"	0:57
11.	"Your Enemies"	1:50
12.	"Black Adam Spotted"	1:37
13.	"Not Interested"	1:41
14.	"Just Say Shazam"	4:11
15.	"Ancient Palace"	3:15
16.	"Little Man"	1:40
17.	"Time to Go"	1:35
18.	"Release Him"	0:56
19.	"Father & Son"	3:36
20.	"Black Adam Theme"	3:57
21.	"Fly Bikes"	3:25
22.	"Nanobots"	1:33
23.	"Through the Wall"	2:54
24.	"23 lbs. of Eternium"	2:27
25.	"Is This is End?"	2:05
26.	"It Was Him"	5:49
27.	"Lake Baikal"	2:59
28.	"Capes and Corpses"	1:07
29.	"Hawkman's Fate"	2:10
30.	"The JSA Fights Back"	2:12
31.	"A Bad Plan Is a Good Plan"	1:56
32.	"Dr. Fate"	1:20
33.	"Prison Break"	2:35
34.	"Wet Rocks"	0:54
35.	"Not a Hero"	1:22
36.	"The Doctor's Destiny"	0:55
37.	"Slave Champion"	1:27
38.	"Legions of Hell"	2:17
39.	"The Man in Black"	0:46
40.	"Adam's Journey"	3:50
41.	"The Justice Society Theme"	5:12
42.	"Black Adam Theme" (iZNiiK Remix)	4:01
43.	"The Justice Society Theme" (iZNiiK Remix)	3:52
Total length:		109:00

== Additional music ==
In addition to Balfe's score, other songs used in the film include "Bullet with Butterfly Wings" by the Smashing Pumpkins, "Paint It Black" by the Rolling Stones, "Baby Come Back" by Player, "The Trio" from The Good, The Bad and The Ugly (1966) by Ennio Morricone, "Power" by Kanye West featuring Dwele, and "Exile" by Eric Zayne. Featured in the end credits, "Exile" was received positively by fans. Regarding its creation, Johnson asked Zayne and his fellow songwriters Lauren Hashian (Johnson's wife) and Naz Tokio to write a song "that was commensurate with the power and attitude of the character of Black Adam and people all over the world who refuse to be held down"; he praised the final result. A rendition of John Williams' Superman theme is played during the mid-credits scene, which Superman actor Henry Cavill said was selected over Hans Zimmer's Man of Steel theme because it was more recognizable to audiences.

== Reception ==
Zanobard Reviews gave a mixed response for Black Adam score, saying "Lorne Balfe's score for Black Adam is at least moderately entertaining, though I'm afraid to say I did also find it a little boring at times. The main reason for this is that to be honest, there's not a whole lot the two hour soundtrack album here does that the two main theme tracks don't simply cover in ten minutes [...] the two main themes of the score – Black Adam and Justice Society – play in almost deafeningly loud, thunderously grandiose and heroic form throughout their two thematic debut cues (to the point where they're almost a little much at times), and while this is pretty enjoyable, they then essentially repeat in this form throughout the two hour soundtrack album, reprising in the same or very similar epic grandiose manner to that of the main theme tracks, without really building or growing, or progressing narratively in much if any way. The way you hear the themes in their debut tracks is the way they play across the entire album, which makes the score overall sadly just a bit… dull as a result."

In a positive note, Jonathan Broxton of Music Music UK wrote "Black Adam is another illustration of just what a good, reliable composer Lorne Balfe is becoming, continuing the trend he has shown over the past three or four years. It's a score very much steeped in the modern action superhero genre, and anyone who has an aversion to that heavy sound, or to the electronic percussion and manipulation that is often found in films of the type, may find it not to their taste [...] the various elements that combine to make up the two main themes are excellent, both individually and together, and the creativity Balfe shows in his orchestration and his choral ideas is impressive. The energy levels are high throughout, and it avoids the trap of simply relying on basic drum loops and endless drones" and concluded "Overall, this is good stuff – perhaps a step down from Black Widow, but certainly good enough to recommend to anyone who enjoyed those previous efforts."
