= Zsela =

American singer-songwriter (born 1995)

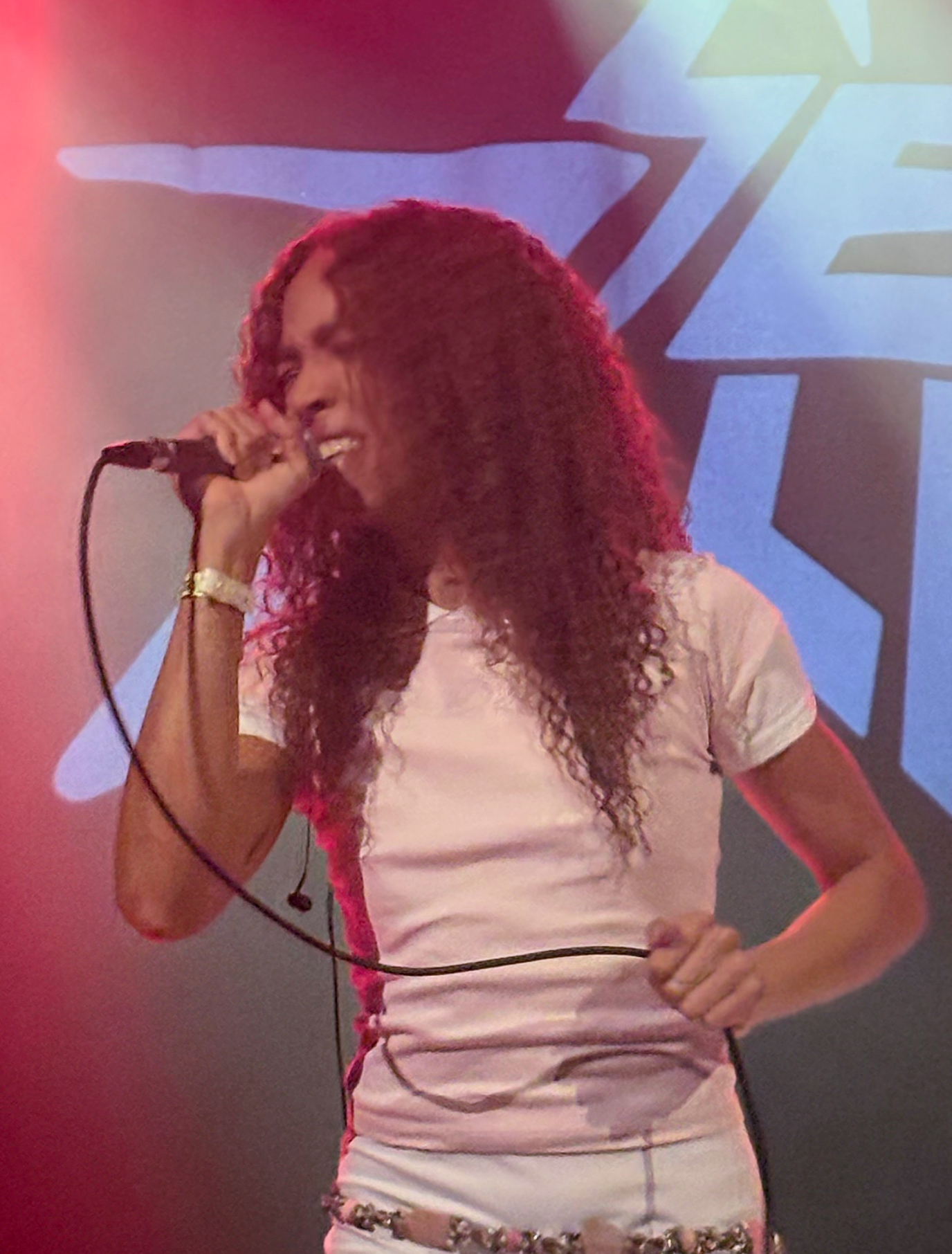
- Zsela in 2025
- Born: 1995 (age 30–31); Brooklyn, New York, U.S.
- Occupation: Singer-songwriter
- Father: Marc Anthony Thompson
- Relatives: Tessa Thompson (half-sister)

Zsela Thompson (/ˈʒeɪlə/ born c. 1995), known mononymously as Zsela, is an American singer-songwriter.

== Early life ==
Zsela was born and raised in Brooklyn, New York. Her father is musician Marc Anthony Thompson of Chocolate Genius, Inc. and her older paternal half-sister is actress Tessa Thompson.

In 2021, she moved to Los Angeles, California.

== Career ==
She self-released her debut EP Ache of Victory in 2020. Her debut album Big For You was released on Mexican Summer in 2024.

In May 2025, it was announced that Zsela would be opening for Nourished by Time on the 2025 The Passionate Ones tour.

== Discography ==
=== Studio albums ===
- Big for You (2024)

=== Extended plays ===
- Ache of Victory (2020)
- AOV (Remixes) <3 (2021)

=== Contributions ===
- Karma & Desire (2020) by Actress – vocals on two tracks
- choke enough (2025) by oklou – vocal choir on "family and friends"
- Don't Be Dumb (2026) by ASAP Rocky – background vocals on "Don't Be Dumb / Trip Baby"
