= Ben Petrie =

Canadian actor and filmmaker

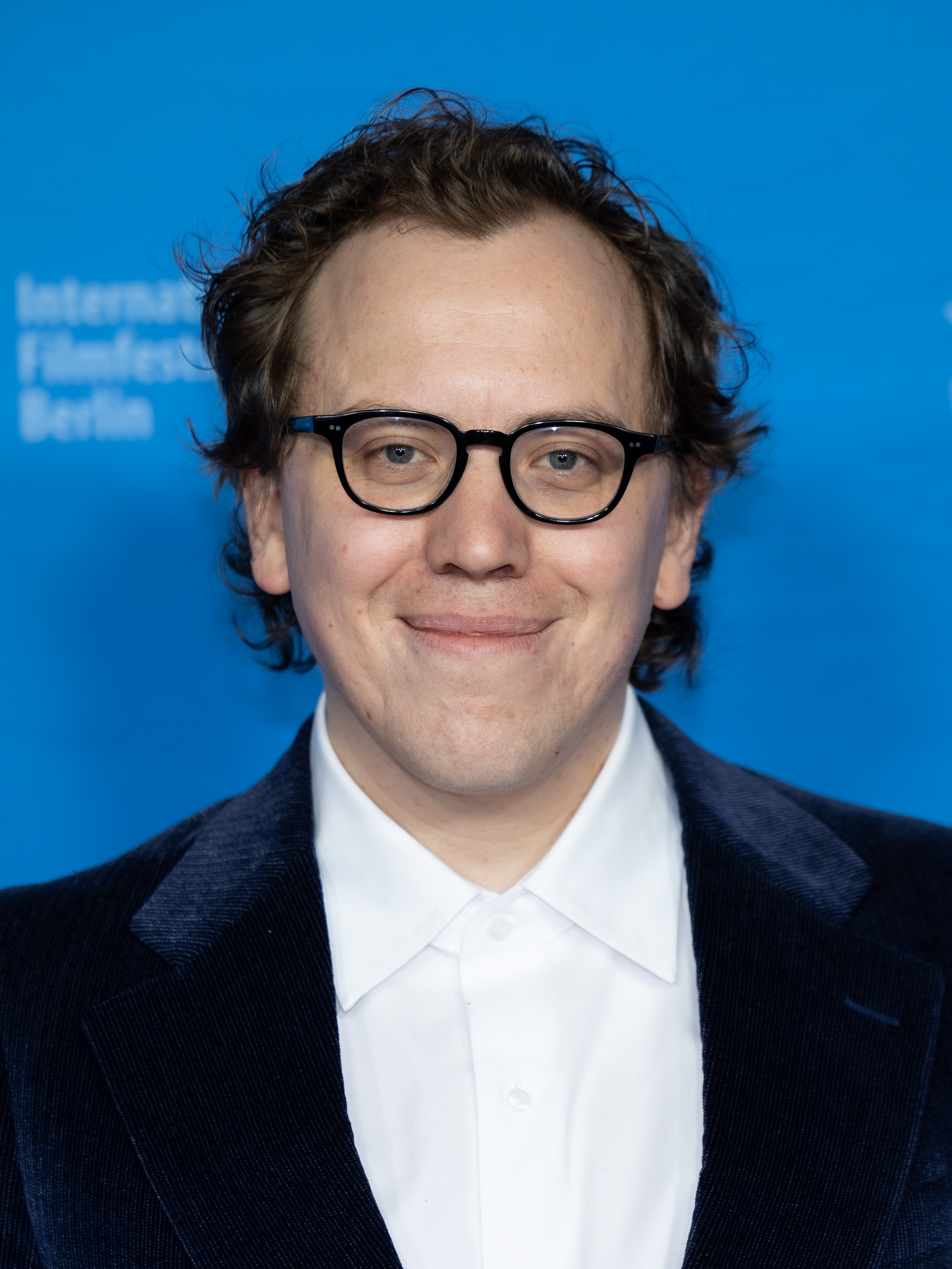
- Petrie at the 2025 Berlinale
- Occupation: Filmmaker
- Known for: Dead Lover, The Heirloom, Her Friend Adam
- Spouse: Grace Glowicki

Ben Petrie is a Canadian actor and filmmaker.

== Career ==
He is a producer, co-writer and actor in Dead Lover, which premiered at the 2025 Sundance Film Festival and had its Canadian Premiere at the 50th Toronto International Film Festival. He stars in Honey Bunch, which premiered at the 75th Berlin International Film Festival in Berlinale Special.

His feature directorial debut, The Heirloom, premiered in 2024 at the 53rd International Film Festival Rotterdam. It was named as one of The 10 Best Canadian Films of 2024 by The Globe and Mail.

He is the writer and director of the short film Her Friend Adam, which premiered at the Sundance Film Festival and was named Best Comedy of 2016 by Vimeo. The film was named to the Toronto International Film Festival's annual year-end Canada's Top Ten list for 2016.

As an actor he has also performed in BlackBerry, Nirvanna the Band the Show the Movie, Tito, and The All Golden.

== Personal life ==
Petrie is married to his frequent collaborator Grace Glowicki.
