= Tito (2019 film) =

- Film poster
- Directed by: Grace Glowicki
- Written by: Grace Glowicki
- Produced by: Grace Glowicki; Miriam Levin-Gold; Ben Petrie
- Starring: Grace Glowicki; Ben Petrie
- Cinematography: Christopher Lew
- Edited by: Brendan Mills
- Music by: Casey Manierka-Quaile
- Production companies: Featured Creatures; Hawkeye Pictures
- Release date: March 13, 2019 (SXSW)
- Running time: 70 minutes
- Country: Canada
- Language: English

Tito is a 2019 Canadian drama film written and directed by Grace Glowicki. Glowicki plays Tito, a man terrified of the outside world and hunted by sexual predators. The refuge he finds in an abandoned house is disturbed by the arrival of John (Ben Petrie), a cheerful and protective neighbor.

== Critical response ==
The New Yorker's Richard Brody called it "the most remarkable feature that I saw at the Maryland festival."

== Production ==
On August 16, 2018 a post-production Kickstarter campaign was launched with a fundraising target of $18,000. Funding closed with $23,027 pledged by 121 backers.

== Release ==
The film premiered at the 2019 South by Southwest Film Festival, where it won the Adam Yauch Hörnblowér Award. It also won the first Audacity Award at the 2019 Oldenburg International Film Festival.

The film was shortlisted for the John Dunning Best First Feature Award at the 9th Canadian Screen Awards in 2021.
