= Hemorrhage (film) =

- Directed by: Braden Croft
- Written by: Braden Croft
- Produced by: Elizabeth Levine; Adrian Salpeter; Samantha Sheplawy
- Starring: Alex D. Mackie; Brittney Gabrill; Ryland Alexander; Diane Wallace; Samara von Rad; Zachary Parsons-Lozinski
- Cinematography: Braden Croft
- Edited by: Braden Croft
- Music by: Steve Hughes
- Production companies: BMC Pictures; Random Bench Productions
- Distributed by: Phase 4 Films
- Release dates: 24 July 2012 (Fantasia International Film Festival); 1 June 2013 (VOD)
- Running time: 79 minutes
- Country: Canada
- Language: English

Hemorrhage is a 2012 Canadian horror thriller film directed by Braden Croft, starring Alex D. Mackie, Brittney Gabrill, Ryland Alexander, Diane Wallace, Samara von Rad and Zachary Parsons-Lozinski.

== Cast ==
- Alex D. Mackie as Oliver Lorenz
- Brittney Gabrill as Claire
- Ryland Alexander as Ronnie
- Diane Wallace as Dr. Peck
- Samara von Rad as Janet Lorenz
- Zachary Parsons-Lozinski as Todd
- Braden Croft as Ray
- Grace Glowicki as Pharmacist

== Release ==
The film was released on VOD on 1 June 2013.

== Reception ==
John Anderson of Variety wrote a positive review of the film, writing that "Croft, working with limited resources, shows what a filmmaker can accomplish through visual virtuosity." Mark L. Miller of Ain't It Cool News wrote a positive review of the film, calling it "an effective thriller with strong performances from a fresh pair of lead actors and some truly impressive restraint on the part of the director." Ian Sedensky of Culture Crypt gave the film a score of 70 out of 100, writing that the film "proves that a micro-budget and a crew consisting of generous friends does not automatically exclude professional quality and a competitive edge".
