= The Heirloom (2024 film) =

2024 Canadian film

- Directed by: Ben Petrie
- Written by: Ben Petrie
- Produced by: Justin Elchakieh; Grace Glowicki; Ben Petrie
- Starring: Ben Petrie; Grace Glowicki
- Cinematography: Kelly Jeffrey
- Edited by: Michael Harmon; Brendan Mills; Ben Petrie
- Music by: Casey Manierka-Quaile
- Production company: Cheekdance Spectacular
- Release date: January 27, 2024 (IFFR)
- Running time: 87 minutes
- Country: Canada
- Language: English

The Heirloom is a 2024 Canadian comedy film directed by Ben Petrie.

== Production ==
Based in part on Petrie's own real-life relationship with actress Grace Glowicki, the film stars Petrie and Glowicki as Eric and Allie, a couple who decide to adopt a rescue dog during a COVID-19 lockdown. Despite the challenges of adapting to the new dog, Eric, a filmmaker who has been suffering from writer's block, then becomes inspired to start writing a new screenplay about a couple adopting a dog, with metafictional elements then starting to enter into the story as Eric begins "directing" the film in his head in real time.

The cast also includes Matt Johnson as a belligerent veterinarian, and Leah Doz as his veterinary technician.

The film, Petrie's full-length directorial debut, premiered on January 27, 2024, at the 53rd International Film Festival Rotterdam.

== Critical response ==
Rory O'Connor of The Film Stage wrote that the film's transition from a straightforward narrative into a metafiction about its own making "is often very funny, even as Eric’s narrativizing threatens to further hinder the relationship. Petrie allows Eric’s new obsession to spill into sequences that feel genuinely Kaufmanesque (an overused word, granted, but a distinction well-earned here). In one example, shot from Eric’s POV, Allie excitedly turns around to inform him that Milly has peed; Eric then begins seeing the moment repeated as if in multiple takes, Allie’s performance straining to hit the desired note. Whether these repeats are real or imagined is never explicated, though it’s fevered enough to appear like a figment of Eric’s lockdown brain. In a later scene, a boom mic operator crosses the shot without disturbing the character’s flow, a jarring intrusion during a moment of real vulnerability––and a sharp directorial choice that both douses the tension and accentuates its source."
