= Grace Glowicki =

Canadian actress and filmmaker

- Glowicki at the 2025 Toronto International Film Festival
- Education: McGill University
- Occupations: Actress and filmmaker
- Notable work: Tito; Her Friend Adam; Dead Lover

Grace Glowicki is a Canadian actress and filmmaker from Edmonton, Alberta.

Glowicki directed and starred in the feature film Tito (2019), which was nominated for the John Dunning Best First Feature Award at the 9th Canadian Screen Awards. She is also known for starring in the short film Her Friend Adam (2016), which earned her a special jury award for best actress in a short film at the 2016 Sundance Film Festival, and for directing and starring in the feature film Dead Lover, which premiered at the 2025 Sundance Film Festival.

== Career ==
An alumna of McGill University, Glowicki moved to Toronto, Ontario, after graduation. She has acted in films including Hemorrhage (2012), The Oxbow Cure (2013), Her Friend Adam (2016), Suck It Up, Cardinals, We Forgot to Break Up (all 2017), Paper Year (2018), Raf (2019), Strawberry Mansion (2021), Until Branches Bend (2022), Booger (2023), The Heirloom (2024), Measures for a Funeral (2024) and Honey Bunch (2025) and in the web series Out with Dad and Carmilla.

In 2016, she was named by the Toronto International Film Festival as one of its four "Rising Stars" of the year, alongside Jared Abrahamson, Mylène Mackay and Sophie Nélisse. She won a special jury award for best actress in a short film at the 2016 Sundance Film Festival for Her Friend Adam, and was a Vancouver Film Critics Circle nominee for Best Supporting Actress in a Canadian Film at the Vancouver Film Critics Circle Awards 2017, for her performance in Cardinals.

She attracted notice for directing and starring in the 2019 film Tito, which was a shortlisted finalist for the John Dunning Best First Feature Award at the 9th Canadian Screen Awards in 2021.

In 2020, Glowicki received Telefilm financing for her sophomore feature Dead Lover, which she worked on for five years before it premiered at the 2025 Sundance Film Festival.

In 2025, she starred in Honey Bunch, directed by Madeleine Sims-Fewer and Dusty Mancinelli, which had its world premiere at the 75th Berlin International Film Festival in Berlinale Special. She received the Canadian Screen Award for Best Lead Performance in a Drama Film at the 14th Canadian Screen Awards in 2026.

== Personal life ==
Glowicki is in a relationship with actor and filmmaker Ben Petrie, her costar in Her Friend Adam, Tito, The Heirloom, and Honey Bunch. They have one child together.

== Filmography ==
=== Film ===
| Year | Title | Role | Notes |
|---|---|---|---|
| 2012 | Hemorrhage | Pharmacist | |
| 2013 | The Oxbow Cure | | |
| 2013 | Wet Dreams | | |
| 2013 | Hunter Green | Alex | |
| 2014 | Bonfire | Jen | |
| 2015 | Lady be Good | Alix | |
| 2015 | Diamond Day | Kree | |
| 2015 | Night Runners | Jessica Maclean | |
| 2016 | Her Friend Adam | Liv | |
| 2016 | A Teachable Moment | Young woman | |
| 2016 | Queef | | |
| 2016 | Bella Blue | | |
| 2017 | Suck It Up | Ronnie | |
| 2017 | Cardinals | Zoe Walker | |
| 2017 | We Forgot to Break Up | Coco Coburn | |
| 2018 | Paper Year | Cheyenne | |
| 2018 | Arlo Alone | | |
| 2018 | Glitter's Wild Women | | |
| 2018 | Amityville Witch Activity | | |
| 2019 | Raf | Raf | |
| 2019 | Tito | Tito | Also director, writer, producer |
| 2019 | Hot Flash | Natali Van Damme | |
| 2020 | Strawberry Shake | Charlie | |
| 2021 | Strawberry Mansion | Young Bella | |
| 2022 | Until Branches Bend | Robin | |
| 2023 | Booger | Anna | |
| 2024 | The Heirloom | Allie | |
| 2024 | Measures for a Funeral | Ghost | |
| 2024 | The Legacy of Cloudy Falls | Brigit Gallow | |
| 2025 | Honey Bunch | Diana | |
| 2025 | Dead Lover | Gravedigger | Also director, writer, producer |
| 2025 | How's Archie? | Charlie | |
| 2026 | Lunar Sway | Bailey | |

=== Television ===
| Year | Title | Role | Notes |
|---|---|---|---|
| 2013 | Omega | | |
| 2014 | Out with Dad | Erica | |
| 2014-2016 | Carmilla | Betty Spieldorf | |
