= Maxime Bouttier =

French-Indonesian actor (born 1993)

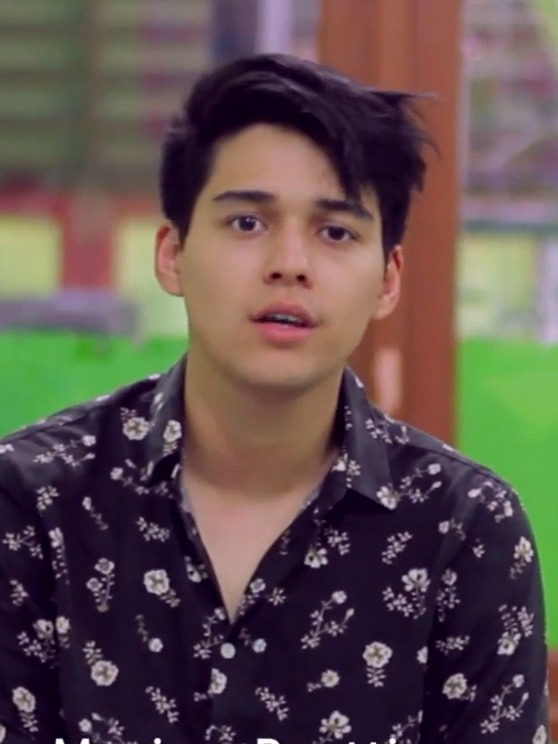
- Bouttier in 2019
- Born: 22 April 1993 (age 33); Poitiers, France
- Occupations: Actor, model
- Years active: 2012–present
- Spouse: Luna Maya (m. 2025)

Maxime Andre Selam Bouttier (born 22 April 1993) is a French-Indonesian actor and model. He is known for portraying Gede in the film Ticket to Paradise (2022).

== Personal life ==
Maxime Andre Selam Bouttier was born on 22 April 1993 in Poitiers, France, as the eldest child and only son of Siti Purnawanti (1965–2024) and Patrice Bouttier. He has a younger sister, Elodie.

== Filmography ==
=== Film ===
Year	Title	Role	Notes
2012	18++ Forever Love	Pascal	
2013	Kata Hati	Aga	
2013	Refrain (film)	Oliver	
2014	Pukulan Maut	Aldo	
2014	Cinta Pertamaku		
2014	After School Horror	Rino	
2014	Kamar 207	Revan	
2014	Remember When (film)	Adrian	
2014	Tak Kemal Maka Tak Sayang	Danil	
2014	Cermin Penari Jaipong	Adit	
2015	Hantu Kuburan Tua	Edwin	
2015	Bidadari Terakhir	Rasya	
2015	Tiger Boy	Todi	
2016	Dilarang Masuk!	Adit	
2016	Beauty and the Best	Aldo	
2016	Otajin	Fredy	
2017	Gunung Kawi (film)	Adit	
2017	A: Aku, Benci & Cinta	Matt	
2017	One Fine Day (2017 film)	Danu	
2018	Meet Me After Sunset	Vino	
2018	Get Lost: Urban Legend di Benteng Pendem	Ringgo	
2018	The Perfect Husband (2018 film)	Ando	
2018	Serendipity (2018 film)	Gibran	
2019	Matt & Mou	Matthew	
2019	Kain Kafan Hitam	Bimo	
2019	Kuntilanak 2 (2019 film)	Edwin	
2022	Ticket to Paradise	Gede	
2023	Dunia Tanpa Suara	Ezra	

=== Television ===
Year	Title	Role	Notes
2011	Nada Cinta	Marco	
2011	Arti Sahabat	Bryan	
2011	Bulan di Atas Mentari	Teman Guntur	
2012	Segalanya Cinta	Kenny	
2013	Kinara (television series)	Dika	
2013	Terbang Bersamamu	Irwan Bouttier	
2013—2014	Putri Duyung	Gio	
2014	Hidayah Cinema		Episode: "Maafkan Aku Ibu"
2014	Cakep Cakep Sakti	Marvel	
2015	Vampire (television series)	Verrel	
2016	Melodi	Rendra	
2017	Bawang Merah Bawang Putih (television series)	Reza	
2017	Magic Hour the Series	Tegar	
2019	Magic Hour the Series 2	Tegar	
2019	Rewrite (television series)	Abi	
2019	Janji di Atas Ingkar	Farhan Ramadhan	
2019	Cahaya Terindah	Nathan Alvaro	
2021	Unknown (television series)	Rangga	
2022	Roda-Roda Gila	Kelvin Mahendra	
2022	Mr. Midnight: Beware the Monsters	Ben	10 episodes
2024	The Perfect Strangers	Liam Raja Hadiwiguno	
