= Harvest Sky =

Single by Oklou and Underscores

from the album Choke Enough
- A-side: "Obvious"
- Released: 16 October 2024
- Genre: Eurodance
- Length: 3:53
- Label: True Panther Sounds
- Songwriters: Marylou Mayniel; Nate Campany; April Harper Grey; Danny L Harle; Casey Manierka-Quaile
- Producers: Oklou; Danny L Harle; Casey MQ; Nick Léon; Underscores

Oklou singles chronology
"Family and Friends" (2024)	"Harvest Sky" / "Obvious" (2025)	"Harvest Sky" (Danny L Harle C Mix) (2024)

Underscores singles chronology
"My Guy (Corporate Shuffle)" (2024)	"Harvest Sky" (2024)	"Harvest Sky" (Danny L Harle C Mix) (2024)

Visualizer
- "Harvest Sky" on YouTube

"Harvest Sky" (stylised in all lowercase) is a song by French musician Oklou and American musician Underscores, from the former's debut studio album, Choke Enough (2025). It was released on 16 October 2024, through True Panther Sounds, as a double single with the song "Obvious". The song was written by both artists alongside Danny L Harle, Casey MQ, and Nate Campany, the former four producing it with Nick Léon. Remixes by Harle and Milkfish (an alias of Underscores) were released on 18 December 2024.

== Background and release ==
In an interview with Crack, Oklou stated that "Harvest Sky" was partly inspired by La Fête de la Saint-Jean, a festival in which bonfires are lit to celebrate the Nativity of John the Baptist. According to her, "I'm very attached to these memories because it was very joyful at the time, but there's also the capacity for these moments to be weird as fuck. There's adults not being super careful or very sober – there are some dark moments as well." In the same interview, Oklou stated that one of her favorite things "is hearing the sounds of people partying from afar", a habit she picked up as a child and felt was a "different connection" compared to actual partying.

"Harvest Sky" was released on 16 October 2024, as a double A-side single with album track "Obvious". In a statement accompanying the release, Oklou stated that "Harvest Sky" was "probably my third attempt to talk about one thing that happens at times during festivities; zoom out from the crowd and enter a lonely mental space." A visualizer for the track was released on the same day.

== Composition ==
Musically, "Harvest Sky" has been described as combining "traditional folk melodies" with "clubby" soundscapes. It starts off with a trance melody that builds as the song becomes a "big room anthem". Several publications have noted its influence from Eurodance, with Dusted describing the song's sound as "like you're hearing Eurodance from the next room over", while Nylon's Lindsay Hattrick called it "a hypnotic Eurodance throwback that sounds as if you are clubbing in a medieval dungeon." Jesper of Sputnikmusic felt that the song was "as close as we're going to get to an all-out spa banger from oklou".

== Critical reception ==
Upon release, "Harvest Sky" received positive reviews from music critics. Ranking it as Oklou's third best collaboration, Tiarna of Dazed wrote that the song was "a godly team-up that a crowd goes crazy for", supporting this with an anecdote of how she "saw an arena erupt in euphoria when this track played at Dekmantel last year". Clash's Robin Murray praised how Oklou's "painterly touch comes to the fore" on it, opining that her "digital world-building help[s] to focus on an emotional canvas."

== Release history ==
Release dates and formats for "Harvest Sky"
Region	Date	Format	Label	Ref.
Worldwide	14 October 2024	Digital download; streaming	True Panther Sounds	
Worldwide	16 December 2024	Digital download; streaming	True Panther Sounds	
