= Club Shy =

EP by Shygirl
- Released: 9 February 2024
- Recorded: 2023
- Genres: House; EDM
- Length: 15:32
- Label: Because Music
- Producers: Shygirl; Kingdom; Big Ever; Boys Noize; SG Lewis; Karma Kid; Sega Bodega; Oscar Scheller; Girl Unit; Mark Ralph

Shygirl chronology
Nymph in the Wild (2023)	Club Shy (2024)	Fabric Presents Shygirl (DJ Mix) (2024)

Shygirl chronology
Fabric Presents Shygirl (DJ Mix) (2024)	Club Shy RMX (2024)	Club Shy Room 2 (2025)

Singles from Club Shy
- 1. "Thicc" Released: 14 November 2023; 2. "F@k€" Released: 10 December 2023; 3. "Tell Me" Released: 16 January 2024; 4. "Mr Useless" Released: 9 February 2024; 5. "Encore" Released: 14 May 2024

Club Shy is the sixth EP by British rapper and singer Shygirl, released on 9 February 2024 through Because Music. Shygirl adds her own textures to dance hits from the 1990s and 2000s on the EP, Club Shy. She discusses flawless escape and the reason she's "finally having fun" with Thomas Hobbs.

The EP is supported by the singles "Thicc" featuring Cosha, "F@k€" featuring Kingdom, "Tell Me" featuring Boys Noize, and "Mr Useless" featuring SG Lewis.

A remix EP titled Club Shy RMX was released on 7 June 2024, it includes the single "Encore" featuring Danny L Harle.

== Background and release ==
Following Club Shy's 2022 opening at London's Metropolis nightclub, there was a PinkPantheress-hosted LA night and Club Shy Brazil, which included special sets by VTSS, LSDXOXO, and guest Charli XCX. Later, Shygirl hosted Club Shy events in New York's storied Webster Hall and Chicago's Club Shy.

== Critical reception ==
Professional ratings
Aggregate scores
Source	Rating
Metacritic	80/100
Review scores
Source	Rating
DIY	4/5 stars
The Line of Best Fit	8/10
Pitchfork	7.5/10
Under the Radar	7.5/10

The EP was met with positive reviews, highlighting its energetic and nostalgic approach to electronic music. According to MuuMuse, the EP is a "sultry, sweaty" collection of tracks that are essential for any club setting. The review praises Shygirl's ability to blend '90s and '00s club influences with modern electronic sounds, resulting in a no-filler, high-energy set perfect for the dance floor. Each track showcases different elements of club music, from the hypnotic beats of 4eva to the catchy and playful mr useless.

Mixmag featured an in-depth interview with Shygirl, where they discussed the creative process behind Club Shy. The publication commended the EP for its dynamic production and Shygirl's distinctive vocal style. They also highlighted how Club Shy reflects her growth as an artist and her ability to push boundaries in dance music.

== Track listing ==
Club Shy track listing
No.	Title	Writer(s)	Producer(s)	Length
1.	"4eva" (featuring Empress Of and Kingdom)	Lorely Rodriguez; Jarina De Marco; Blane Muise	Shygirl; Kingdom	2:20
2.	"F@k€" (featuring Kingdom)	Phillip Gamble; Ezra Rubin; Muise	Shygirl; Kingdom; Girl Unit	1:47
3.	"Mute" (featuring Lolo Zouaï)	Thomas McAlister; Laureen Zouaï; Oscar Scheller; Muise	Shygirl; Scheller; Big Ever	2:28
4.	"Tell Me" (featuring Boys Noize)	Alexander Ridha; Salvador Navarrete; Muise	Shygirl; Boys Noize; Sega Bodega	2:43
5.	"Mr Useless" (with SG Lewis)	Samuel Lewis; Muise	Shygirl; SG Lewis	2:29
6.	"Thicc" (featuring Cosha)	Sam Knowles; Cassia O'Reilly; Navarrete; Muise	Shygirl; Karma Kid; Sega Bodega; Mark Ralph	3:42
Total length:				15:32

Club Shy (Extended)
No.	Title	Length
1.	"4eva" (extended; featuring Empress Of and Kingdom)	3:19
2.	"F@k€" (extended; featuring Kingdom)	2:46
3.	"Mute" (extended; featuring Lolo Zouaï)	3:24
4.	"Tell Me" (extended; featuring Boys Noize)	4:03
5.	"Mr Useless" (extended; featuring SG Lewis)	3:29
6.	"Thicc" (extended; featuring Cosha)	4:37
Total length:		21:65

Club Shy RMX
No.	Title	Writer(s)	Producer(s)	Length
1.	"4eva" (X-Coast remix; featuring Empress Of and Kingdom)			4:50
2.	"F@k€" (VTSS remix; featuring Kingdom)			4:08
3.	"Mute" (Logic1000 remix; featuring Lolo Zouaï)			3:44
4.	"Tell Me" (K edit; featuring Boys Noize)			2:44
5.	"Mr Useless" (MK remix; featuring SG Lewis)			2:50
6.	"Thicc" (Fedde Le Grand remix; featuring Cosha)			4:47
7.	"Encore" (featuring Danny L Harle)	Muise; Daniel Harle	Shygirl; Danny L Harle	2:50
Total length:				25:53
