= Swallow! =

Studio album by Shygirl
- Released: 6 November 2026
- Recorded: September 2023 – December 2025
- Genre: Experimental pop
- Length: 34:56
- Label: Because
- Producers: Casey MQ; Clams Casino; Dahi; Karma Kid; Baz Kaye; Oslo Motherfuckers; JD Reid; Ely Rise; Shrink; Shygirl

Shygirl chronology
Alias Is Me (2025)	Swallow! (2026)

Singles from Swallow!
- 1. "Alyse" Released: 20 August 2026; 2. "Lucky[Hymn]" Released: 10 September 2026; 3. "Mantra" Released: 13 October 2026; 4. "Eternal" Released: 4 November 2026

Swallow! is the second studio album by the British musician Shygirl, released on 6 November 2026 through Because Music. It follows her debut studio album, Nymph (2022), and was developed over a period of over two years.

== Background and development ==
Following the release of Nymph in 2022, Shygirl began working on the album in 2023, coinciding with the beginning of her relationship with actor George Smale, whom she had met through the celebrity dating app Raya in December 2022. Their relationship served as a major source of inspiration for the album's material. The album reflects a period of "coming-of-age" in Shygirl's life, with its lyrics exploring her relationship, her sense of self and the world around her. Another source of inspiration came from her supporting performances for artists such as Beyoncé, Charli XCX and Troye Sivan. With Swallow!, Shygirl sought to create music capable of filling arenas as a headlining artist.

The album began to "take shape" towards the end of 2023, with Shygirl seeking to capture the emotions associated with being in a relationship. Recording began in September 2023 and concluded in December 2025. She estimated that the actual recording process took "closer to two months", although she allowed the songs time to develop, preferring not to rush the process. For the album, she collaborated with British producer Karma Kid and Canadian composer Casey MQ, specifically asking them to incorporate "guitars and piano", instruments she had previously felt less confident using extensively. However, she clarified that exploring a new musical direction did not require her to abandon her "electronic roots", instead incorporating more elements of "indie pop songwriting" into her sound. Shygirl described the album as "more grounded" than its predecessor, calling it "another feather in my bow". She expressed hope that listeners would be able to "take something of their own" from the record.

== Promotion ==
The album was announced on 10 September 2026 alongside the release of its second single, "Lucky[Hymn]", described as a "punchy, dynamic return" that sees Shygirl "building outwards" while further developing her alter ego Alyse, previously introduced in the single of the same name.

Other songs released ahead of the album included "Alyse" on 20 August, "Mantra" on 13 October, and "Eternal", which serves as the album's closing track, on 4 November 2026.

== Critical reception ==
Swallow! ratings
Aggregate scores
Source	Rating
Metacritic	87/100
Review scores
Source	Rating
The Arts Desk	5/5 stars
The Line of Best Fit	7/10
Slant Magazine	4/5 stars

According to the review aggregator Metacritic, Swallow! received "universal acclaim" based on a weighted average score of 87 out of 100 from 4 critic scores.

Writing for The Arts Desk, Joe Muggs awarded the album a five-out-of-five-star rating, describing it as the work of an "artist fully coming into themselves". He called it a "thrilling statement" from an artist belonging to a generation navigating "information overload", noting how Shygirl draws on influences from earlier pop acts such as Kylie Minogue, Madonna and All Saints, while avoiding sounding "pastiche".

Michael Savio of Slant Magazine argued that Shygirl had "never sounded more confident, nuanced, or alluring" than on the album, describing it as both a "reintroduction" and "an undeniable change of pace" for the musician. He suggested that her career trajectory would be "anything but straightforward or predictable", characterising her as "the real deal" and an emerging pop star.

Writing for The Line of Best Fit, Danillo Lima interpreted the album as "something of a rebirth", describing it as an "experimental pop album" drawing on influences from "1990s British trip hop and breakbeat". He characterised its lyrics as "brutally romantic", praising the record as "quite original" and suggesting that it could point towards "new directions" for experimental pop.

== Track listing ==
All lyrics are written by Shygirl, with other lyricists noted.

Swallow! track listing
No.	Title	Lyrics	Music	Producer(s)	Length
1.	"Alyse"		Shygirl; Casey MQ; Sam Knowles; Cécile Schott	Shygirl; JD Reid; Karma Kid	3:51
2.	"Lucky[Hymn]"	Shygirl; Knowles	Shygirl; Casey MQ; Knowles	Shygirl; Karma Kid; Casey MQ^{[a]}	3:48
3.	"Luvli"		Shygirl; Casey MQ; Baz Kaye; Knowles	Shygirl; Karma Kid; Kaye	2:51
4.	"Submit"		Shygirl; Casey MQ; Knowles; Oslo Motherfuckers	Shygirl; Casey MQ; Karma Kid; Oslo Motherfuckers	2:52
5.	"Live the Life You Like"		Shygirl; Casey MQ; Knowles; Cassia O'Reilly	Shygirl; Casey MQ; Karma Kid	3:07
6.	"Real"		Shygirl; Sam Breathwick; Casey MQ; Knowles	Shygirl; Casey MQ; Karma Kid; Shrink	3:07
7.	"Déjà Vu"		Shygirl; Kaye; Knowles	Shygirl; Karma Kid; Kaye	2:44
8.	"Mantra"	Shygirl; Poppy Haddigan	Shygirl; Clams Casino; Haddigan; Knowles	Shygirl; Clams Casino; Karma Kid; Reid	3:05
9.	"Altar"		Shygirl; Casey MQ; Knowles	Shygirl; Casey MQ; Karma Kid	3:15
10.	"Sublime"		Shygirl; Casey MQ	Shygirl; Casey MQ	3:44
11.	"Eternal"	Shygirl; O'Reilly	Shygirl; Dahi; Rose Gray; Knowles; Ely Rise	Shygirl; Casey MQ; Dahi; Karma Kid; Rise	3:36
Total length:					34:56

=== Note ===
- ^{^[a]} indicate an assistant producer

== Personnel ==
Credits adapted from Tidal.

- Shygirl – vocals
- Nathan Boddy – mixing
- Ben Matravers – mixing assistance
- Lilian Nuthall – mixing assistance
- Heba Kadry – mastering
- Karma Kid – synthesizer (1–3, 8, 11; bass guitar, programming (1, 2, 4–6, 8, 9); guitars (2, 4, 9), drums (3–6), background vocals (7, 8), drum programming (7, 11)
- Casey MQ – piano (1–6, 9–11), strings (1, 2, 6, 7, 10), synthesizer (4–7, 9, 11), programming (4, 5, 9); bass guitar, drums (4); harpsichord (6), drum programming (10)
- Bradley Giroux – engineering (1, 6, 11), strings (2, 7, 10)
- Wonsun Keem – cello (1, 6, 7, 10, 11)
- Jennifer Chia Chuan Wu – viola (1, 6, 7, 10, 11)
- Nicole Garcia – violin (1, 6, 7, 10, 11)
- Steve Chieh-Wei Chiu – violin (1, 6, 7, 10, 11)
- George Smale – vocals (1)
- Amy Langley – cello (2, 6)
- Baz Kaye – bass guitar, guitars (3, 7, 11); synthesizer (3, 7), programming (11)
- Sam Breathwick – synthesizer (6)
- Cole Berliner – guitars (10)
- Dahi – drum programming, sampler, synthesizer (11)
- Cassia O'Reilly – vocals (11)

== Charts ==
Chart performance for Swallow!
Chart (2026)	Peak position
French Physical Albums (SNEP)	196
Scottish Albums (Official Charts)	75
UK Albums Sales (Official Charts)	44
UK Dance Albums (Official Charts)	2
UK Independent Albums (Official Charts)	22
