= Still (Erika de Casier album) =

Studio album by Erika de Casier
- Released: 21 February 2024
- Recorded: 2023
- Genres: R&B; electronica
- Label: 4AD
- Producers: Erika de Casier; Nick León; N. Zaks

Erika de Casier chronology
Sensational (2021)	Still (2024)	Lifetime (2025)

Singles from Still
- 1. "Lucky" Released: 10 January 2024; 2. "Ice" Released: 6 February 2024; 3. "Ex-Girlfriend" Released: 20 March 2024

Still is the third studio album from Danish singer-songwriter Erika de Casier. It was released by 4AD on 21 February 2024. On 10 January 2024, de Casier released the lead single, "Lucky", and announced the album's release date. NPR ranked the album as one of the year's most-anticipated albums, while multiple outlets designated the lead single as one of the week's best releases. The second single, "Ice", was released on 6 February 2024 along with an announcement of 2024 tour dates.

Upon its release, the album received favorable reviews from music critics, who praised the album's production and songwriting. The album placed on multiple outlets' rankings of the year's best albums, with critics calling it "sexy" and praising its Y2K-era influences.

== Background ==
In 2019, de Casier released her debut studio album, Essentials, on Independent Jeep Music. The album gained a cult following, and the following year Dua Lipa invited de Casier to remix her single "Physical". Her second album, Sensational, was released by 4AD in 2021 and drew critical acclaim. It was followed by a remix album. In the following years, de Casier gained more attention after producing and writing four songs for K-pop group NewJeans' 2023 EP, Get Up, particularly its single "Super Shy", which multiple outlets ranked the best song of the year. She further appeared as a guest vocalist on tracks by artists including Mura Masa and Shygirl.

In an August 2023 profile, de Casier revealed to GQ that she had just finished recording the album, indicating that it was "coming soon". In a January 2024 interview with The Guardian, de Casier stated that she was experiencing "cold feet" about the album's upcoming release, elaborating that "when you start making music you have this feeling of: 'Oh, this is great, and it's fresh,' and then after a while you get critical about everything. So I'm in that stage." The album was her first to include collaborations with other artists, including American hip-hop duo They Hate Change, English DJ Shygirl, and British producer Blood Orange.

== Composition ==
According to The Guardian, Still is a loose concept album about each stage in a relationship, "from hot-and-heavy beginnings to messy endings". Clash reported that the album would retain the "noughties-tinged, retro-futurist formula" of her earlier releases, but that the album would feature a greater emphasis on storytelling, not just production. The album will include both electronic and live instrumentation. De Casier produced the album herself, with additional producers including longtime collaborator N, with Nick León, Jonathan Jull Ludvigsen, Carl Emil Johansen, Niels Kirk, Christian Rhode Lindinger, Kirsten Nyhus Janssen, and Tobias Sachse.

The lead single, "Lucky", is a piano ballad whose instrumentation includes breakbeats and "dreamy chords". It also incorporates "rapid-fire" liquid drum and bass percussion and jungle production. The song is accented with giggles, while the lyrics include "Do I like this?/Do I like that?/You make it real easy to love you right back" and "Copenhagen's so grey/But see, whenever I'm with you, it's okay". De Casier's vocal performance on the track has been described as "coy" and "cozy". Gorilla vs. Bear likened the song to an electronic R&B version of Christopher Cross's "Sailing" (1979). "Ice", an R&B song which incorporates hip-hop and 1990s influences, describes a relationship in which de Casier longs for someone who ignores her, with lyrics including "Falling harder every time you ghost me / Next minute in your arms like it's all gone". Notion described the song as sounding like "if the '00s existed in space" and noted the song's "ethereal Y2K tones". They Hate Change provide guest verses on the track. The song ends abruptly with the word "stop". "Ooh" is a "slinky" song in which de Casier flirts and describes her fantasies. De Casier stated that "My Day Off" was inspired by a time that she "didn't feel like answering any emails or messages"; the song also mentions catching up on laundry, which The Guardian deemed a "very un-R&B topic".

== Release ==
On 9 January 2024, National Public Radio included Still in a list of the 10 most anticipated albums of 2024. The following day, de Casier announced that the album would be released on 21 February 2024. In an Instagram post, she confirmed the album would contain 14 tracks. The album was released in CD and LP formats, as well as via streaming and assorted digital download types.

=== Album art and title ===
The album cover depicts de Casier wearing leather in a hall of mirrors, being pursued by paparazzi. The Face wrote that the image resembled a still from a late 1990s music video by director Hype Williams. De Casier stated that the album title was inspired by Jennifer Lopez and Dr. Dre. Like de Casier's previous album titles, Essentials and Sensational, she opted for an album title that sounded like a greatest hits collection; in a 2024 interview with The Guardian, she stated that she had considered the alternate title Platinum, but that she "thought that was maybe too much".

=== Singles ===
On 10 January 2024, de Casier released the lead single from the project, "Lucky". Its accompanying music video, directed by Jesse May Fisher and released the same day as the song, references early 2000s YouTube videos of people walking on the beach alone. The video was titled on YouTube as "me walking on the beach". Brooklyn Vegan, The Face, Pitchfork, and Notion featured "Lucky" in their playlists of the week's best songs, with the latter praising the song as "ethereal" and its production as "enchanting". Stereogum ranked it the second-best song of the week, writing that it "feels like it's so in the past it's part of the future". Consequence named it a runner-up for its song of the week, with critic Paolo Ragusa describing the song as "as exuberant as de Casier gets".

De Casier released the second single, "Ice", on 6 February 2024. Featuring Florida hip-hop duo They Hate Change, it marked the first collaboration ever released by de Casier. An accompanying, self-directed music video, de Casier plays the role as the third member of They Hate Change. In addition to the single, de Casier announced a list of North American tour dates to take place in March and April 2024. Exclaim! named the track a staff pick, while The Face listed the song as one of the week's "best new tracks" and Notion included the track on their "Undiscovered" playlist of the week's best new music.

== Critical reception ==
Professional ratings
Aggregate scores
Source	Rating
Metacritic	73/100
Review scores
Source	Rating
AllMusic	3/5 stars
Beats Per Minute	79%
Exclaim!	7/10
The Line of Best Fit	7/10
Pitchfork	7.4/10
Slant Magazine	4/5 stars

Still received a score of 73 out of 100 on review aggregator Metacritic based on seven critics' reviews, indicating "generally favorable" reception.

Multiple outlets ranked the album among the best of the year. Pitchfork, ranking the album at number 40 on its list of the 50 best albums of 2024, called the album "beautifully human" and praised the lyrics as "sexy, humble, and, above all, relatable." Stereogum called the album "hair-raisingly beautiful" and "as sexy and biting as ever", ranking it as the year's twentieth-best album. Bandcamp included the album among its list of the year's best albums, observing that "Erika is in her Y2K princess bag and rewriting the blueprint, still."

=== Year-end lists ===
Select year-end rankings for Still
Publication	Accolade	Rank	Ref.
Bandcamp	The Best Albums of 2024: A – F	—N/a	
Gorilla vs. Bear	Best Albums of 2024	36	
Pitchfork	The 50 Best Albums of 2024	40	
Stereogum	The 50 Best Albums of 2024	20	

== Track listing ==
Still track listing
No.	Title	Lyrics	Music	Producer(s)	Length
1.	"Right This Way"	Erika de Casier	de Casier	de Casier	1:48
2.	"Home Alone"	de Casier	de Casier; Natal Zaks; Carl Emil Johansen	de Casier; Zaks	3:31
3.	"Lucky"	de Casier	de Casier	de Casier; Zaks^{[a]}	3:25
4.	"The Princess"	de Casier	Tobias Sachse Mogensen	de Casier	2:17
5.	"Ice" (featuring They Hate Change)	de Casier; Vonne Parks; Andre Gainey	de Casier; Zaks; Johansen	de Casier; Zaks	2:47
6.	"Test It"	de Casier	de Casier; Zaks; Jonathan Jull Ludvigsen	de Casier; Zaks^{[a]}	2:47
7.	"Ooh"	de Casier	de Casier	de Casier; Zaks^{[a]}	4:03
8.	"Believe It"	de Casier	de Casier	de Casier	3:07
9.	"Anxious"	de Casier	de Casier; Ludvigsen; Johansen	de Casier	2:09
10.	"Ex-Girlfriend" (featuring Shygirl)	de Casier; Shygirl	de Casier; Nick Léon; Niels Kirk; Christian Rohde Lindinger; Ludvigsen; Kirsten Nyhus Janssen	de Casier; Léon^{[a]}; Zaks^{[a]}	3:36
11.	"Toxic"	de Casier	de Casier; Lindinger; Zaks; Johansen; Ludvigsen; Janssen	de Casier; Zaks^{[a]}	3:03
12.	"My Day Off"	de Casier	de Casier; Zaks	Zaks; de Casier^{[a]}	3:34
13.	"Twice" (featuring Blood Orange)	de Casier; Devonté Hynes	de Casier; Hynes; Johansen; Ludvigsen; Zaks	de Casier	3:44
14.	"Someone"	de Casier	de Casier; Zaks; Johansen; Ludvigsen	de Casier	3:26
Total length:					43:17

Notes

- ^{^[a]} signifies a co-producer
- "Lucky" contains a sample of "Can't Let Go" as performed by Linda Kiraly, written by Rodney "Darkchild" Jerkins, LaShawn Daniels, Delisha Thomas, Anesha & Antea Birchett, and Dernst Emile.
- "Believe It" contains a sample of "Ocean (London Mix)", as performed by Placid Angles, written by John Beltran.

== Personnel ==
- Erika de Casier – lead vocals, programming
- Alex Gordon – mastering
- Natal Zaks – mixing (all tracks), studio musician (tracks 2, 3, 5–7, 11–14), programming (2, 5–7, 13)
- Carl Johansen – studio musician (tracks 2, 5, 9, 11, 13)
- Tobias Mogensen – studio musician (track 4)
- Jonathan Ludvigsen – studio musician (tracks 6, 9–11, 13, 14)
- Nick León – programming, studio musician (track 10)
- Christian Lindinger – studio musician (tracks 10, 11)
- Kirsten Janssen – studio musician (tracks 10, 11)
- Niels Kirk – studio musician (track 10)

== Release history ==
Release formats for Still
Region	Date	Format	Label	Ref.
Various	21 February 2024	CD; digital download; streaming; vinyl; 24-bit	4AD	
