= Can't Let Go =

Can't Let Go may refer to:

== Music ==
=== Albums ===
- I Can’t Let Go, a 2022 album by Suki Waterhouse
- Can't Let Go, a 1995 album by Cantopop singer Sammi Cheng

=== Songs ===
==== "I Can't Let Go" ====
- "I Can't Let Go", a song made famous by the Hollies in 1966
- "I Can't Let Go" (Smash song), a 2013 song from the U.S. TV series Smash
- "I Can't Let Go", a song by Annie from the 2009 album Don't Stop

==== "Can't Let Go" ====
- "Can't Let Go" (Earth, Wind & Fire song), 1979
- "Can't Let Go" (Mariah Carey song), 1991
- "Can't Let Go" (Randy Weeks song), made famous by Lucinda Williams in 1998
- "Can't Let Go" (Anthony Hamilton song), 2005
- "Can't Let Go" (Linda Király song), 2007
- "Can't Let Go", a song by Adele from the 2015 album 25
- "Can't Let Go", a song by Bryan Ferry from the 1978 album The Bride Stripped Bare
- "Can't Let Go", a song by Caught a Ghost, theme song of the TV series Bosch
- "Can't Let Go", a song by Faydee released in 2013
- "Can't Let Go", a song by Natasha Bedingfield from her 2019 album Roll with Me
