= Come For Me =

Come For Me may refer to:

- "Come for Me" (Shygirl song), 2022 song by Shygirl
- "Come For Me", 2021 song from the album Keys by Alicia Keys
