= Nymph (album) =

2022 studio album by Shygirl

Studio album by Shygirl
- Released: 30 September 2022
- Recorded: 2021
- Genres: Pop; experimental pop; hip-hop
- Length: 32:31
- Labels: Because Music; Nuxxe
- Producers: Sega Bodega; Karma Kid; Mura Masa; Arca; BloodPop; Vegyn; Danny L Harle; Kingdom; Cecile Believe; Oscar Scheller; Noah Goldstein

Shygirl chronology
Apple Music Home Session: Shygirl (2022)	Nymph (2022)	Nymph_o (2023)

Singles from Nymph
- 1. "Firefly" Released: 10 May 2022; 2. "Come for Me" Released: 7 June 2022; 3. "Coochie (A Bedtime Story)" Released: 20 July 2022; 4. "Nike" Released: 1 September 2022; 5. "Shlut" Released: 27 September 2022

Nymph is the debut studio album by British rapper and singer Shygirl. It was released on 30 September 2022 on vinyl, CD, cassette and digital download, through Because Music. The album was announced alongside the release of its lead single "Firefly" on 10 May 2022. The second single "Come for Me" was released on 7 June 2022. The album was shortlisted for the 2023 Mercury Prize.

== Background ==
On 20 November 2020, Shygirl released her second extended play, Alias, via the Because Music label. Featuring additional production by Kai Whiston, Sophie, and Sega Bodega, Alias was critically praised by outlets such as Pitchfork and NME and received a column in Vogue. After pursuing other projects such as a performance film titled "Blu", a remix EP, and being featured on a remix of Lady Gaga and Blackpink's "Sour Candy" on Lady Gaga's Dawn of Chromatica remix album, Nymph had its writing process commence in late September 2021 and end in December of the same year.

== Composition ==
Nymph is primarily a pop album, through critics have noted that the album resists strict genre classification. "Firefly", "Heaven", and "Coochie (A Bedtime Story)" are all hyperpop songs with the latter incorporating trap beats. UK garage and 2-step are present on both "Firefly" and "Wildfire", while "Nike" and "Missing U" incorporate rap music. "Poison" is a Europop-inspired blog house track "with a raucous accordion hook and club-ready bass squelches". "Honey" merges jungle breakbeats and liquid drum 'n' bass into a "sultry" R&B ballad. The Arca-produced "Come for Me" has been described as a "mutant" reggaetón song containing "sparse, militant drum patterns sound like they’ve been swallowed by broken subwoofers."

== Critical reception ==
Professional ratings
Aggregate scores
Source	Rating
Metacritic	84/100
Review scores
Source	Rating
Crack	8/10
The Line of Best Fit	9/10
NME	4/5 stars
The Observer	4/5 stars
Pitchfork	8.0/10
The Skinny	4/5 stars
The Telegraph	4/5 stars

Nymph was met with universal acclaim upon its release. At Metacritic, which assigns a normalised rating out of 100 to reviews from mainstream publications, the album received an average score of 84, based on 10 reviews. Cameron Cook of Pitchfork praised the album, stating that each track unveiled "some new aspect of Shygirl’s persona, musicality, or, most often, both", and finding that her "siren song" enticed a listener "toward somewhere brighter and more introspective."

The Guardian's Ammar Kalia further noted her "experimenting with its more irreverent aspects" with the record, in comparison to her earlier work having "explored the darker side of the dancefloor", whereas Dhruva Balram of NME found that the album generated "a gleaming collage of club sounds, with each element wholly unique in its execution." Writing for The Skinny, Abbie Aitken found that Nymph "slithers through a jungle of sound" and essentially "created an entire genre".

== Track listing ==
Credits adapted from the album's official liner notes.

Nymph track listing
No.	Title	Writer(s)	Producer(s)	Length
1.	"Woe"	Shygirl; Karma Kid; Sega Bodega	Shygirl; Karma Kid; Sega Bodega	3:40
2.	"Come for Me"	Shygirl; Arca	Shygirl; Arca	3:44
3.	"Shlut"	Shygirl; BloodPop; Sega Bodega; Cosha	Shygirl; BloodPop; Sega Bodega	2:12
4.	"Little Bit"	Shygirl; Sega Bodega	Shygirl; Sega Bodega	1:20
5.	"Firefly"	Shygirl; Kingdom; Sega Bodega; Cecile Believe	Shygirl; Kingdom; Sega Bodega; Cecile Believe^{[a]}	3:18
6.	"Coochie (A Bedtime Story)"	Shygirl; Karma Kid; Mura Masa; Sega Bodega; Cosha	Shygirl; Karma Kid; Mura Masa; Sega Bodega	3:02
7.	"Heaven"	Shygirl; Mura Masa; Kingdom; Danny L Harle; Sega Bodega	Shygirl; Mura Masa; Kingdom; Sega Bodega^{[a]}	2:44
8.	"Nike"	Shygirl; Mura Masa; Oscar Scheller	Shygirl; Mura Masa; Scheller	2:07
9.	"Poison"	Shygirl; Harle; Sega Bodega	Shygirl; Harle; Sega Bodega^{[a]}	2:48
10.	"Honey"	Shygirl; Vegyn; Carter Lang	Shygirl; Vegyn; Mura Masa^{[a]}; Sega Bodega^{[a]}	3:40
11.	"Missin U"	Shygirl; Sega Bodega	Shygirl; Sega Bodega	1:00
12.	"Wildfire"	Shygirl; Sega Bodega; BloodPop; Noah Goldstein; Cosha	Shygirl; Sega Bodega; BloodPop; Goldstein	2:56
Total length:				32:31

Nymph in the Wild track listing
No.	Title	Writer(s)	Producer(s)	Length
1.	"Crush" (live edit) (featuring Erika de Casier)	Shygirl; Erika de Casier; Casey Manierka-Quaile; Cosha; Scheller	Shygirl; de Casier; Casey MQ	3:03
2.	"Shlut" (live edit)	Shygirl; BoodPop; Cosha; Sega Bodega; Madonna; Joe Henry; Mirwais Ahmadzaï	Shygirl; BloodPop	2:53
3.	"Coochie (A Bedtime Story)" (VIP mix)	Shygirl; Cosha; Karma Kid; Mura Masa; Sega Bodega	Shygirl; Karma Kid; Mura Masa; Sega Bodega	3:40
4.	"BB Trek" (DJ Zinc Mashup) (bonus track)	Shygirl; Sega Bodega	Sega Bodega	2:31
Total length:				12:07

Notes

- ^{^[a]}signifies an additional producer
- "Shlut" features additional vocals by Cosha and Sega Bodega.
- "Firefly" features additional vocals by Cecile Believe.

Sample credits

- "Woe" contains a sample of "Bunny is a Rider", performed by Caroline Polachek, written by Polachek and Daniel Harle.
- "Firefly" contains samples of "Ready to Make Luv", performed by Trey Songz, written by Tremaine Aldon Neverson & Troy Taylor.
- "Shlut (live edit)" contains an interpolation of "Don't Tell Me", written by Madonna, Joe Henry, and Mirwais Ahmadzaï, and performed by Madonna.

== Charts ==
Chart performance for Nymph
Chart (2022)	Peak position
Australian Hitseekers Albums (ARIA)	9
Scottish Albums (Official Charts)	12
UK Albums (Official Charts)	34
UK Dance Albums (Official Charts)	1
US Heatseekers Albums (Billboard)	10
US Top Album Sales (Billboard)	64
US Top Dance/Electronic Albums (Billboard)	7

== Nymph_o ==
Nymph_o

Remix album by Shygirl
- Released: 14 April 2023
- Length: 32:17
- Labels: Because Music; Nuxxe
- Producers: Shygirl; Kingdom; Fatima Al Qadiri; Mura Masa; Casey MQ; Erika de Casier; Karma Kid; Sega Bodega; Björk; Oscar Sheller; Danny L Harle; Eartheater; Arca

Shygirl chronology
Nymph (2022)	Nymph_o (2023)	Nymph in the Wild (2023)

Singles from Nymph_o
- 1. "Poison (Club Shy mix)" Released: 5 December 2022; 2. "Heaven (featuring Tinashe)" Released: 28 February 2023; 3. "Woe (I See It from Your Side) (Björk Remix)" Released: 21 March 2023; 4. "Playboy/Positions" Released: 4 April 2023

A deluxe edition/remix album, titled Nymph_o, was announced on 28 February 2023, and released on 14 April 2023. It features new songs, as well as remixes of the album's tracks.

It was preceded by the single releases of "Poison (Club Shy mix)", and a remix of "Heaven", featuring American singer Tinashe. Björk's remix of "Woe" was released as a single on 21 March, followed by "Playboy/Positions" on 4 April.

Additionally, "Unconditional" was originally released in June 2020 exclusively on Bandcamp to raise funds for Black Lives Matter during the George Floyd protests.

No.	Title	Writer(s)	Producer(s)	Length
1.	"Angel" (with Fatima Al Qadiri)	Shygirl; Fatima Al Qadiri; Kingdom	Shygirl; Fatima Al Qadiri; Kingdom	3:49
2.	"Heaven" (featuring Tinashe)	Shygirl; Mura Masa; Kingdom; Sega Bodega; Danny L Harle; Tinashe	Shygirl; Mura Masa; Kingdom; Sega Bodega	2:18
3.	"Crush" (featuring Erika de Casier)	Shygirl; Casey MQ; de Casier; Cosha; Oscar Scheller	Shygirl; Casey MQ; de Casier	2:53
4.	"Woe (I See It from Your Side)" (Björk remix)	Shygirl; Karma Kid; Mura Masa; Sega Bodega; Björk; Cosha	Shygirl; Karma Kid; Mura Masa; Sega Bodega; Björk	3:44
5.	"Shlut" (featuring Sevdaliza)	Shygirl; BloodPop; Sega Bodega; Sevdaliza; Cosha	Shygirl; Sega Bodega	2:09
6.	"Nike" (featuring Deto Black)	Shygirl; Scheller; Mura Masa; Deto Black	Shygirl; Scheller; Mura Masa	2:44
7.	"Playboy/Positions"	Shygirl; Mura Masa; Karma Kid; Cosha	Shygirl; Mura Masa; Karma Kid	2:34
8.	"Poison" (Club Shy mix)	Shygirl; Harle; Sega Bodega	Shygirl; Harle; Sega Bodega	3:35
9.	"Firefly" (Kingdom edit)	Shygirl; Kingdom; Mura Masa; Sega Bodega; Harle	Shygirl; Kingdom; Mura Masa; Sega Bodega^{[a]}	3:31
10.	"Wildfire" (Eartheater remix)	Shygirl; Sega Bodega; Noah Goldstein; Eartheater; Cosha	Shygirl; Sega Bodega; Goldstein; Eartheater	2:58
11.	"Unconditional" (with Arca)	Shygirl; Arca	Shygirl; Arca	2:02
Total length:				32:22

Notes

- ^{^[a]}signifies an additional producer.
- "Playboy/Positions" features additional vocals by Obongjayar.
