= Cassia O'Reilly =

Irish singer-songwriter

- Also known as: Cosha, Bonzai
- Born: Cassia O'Reilly; 1996 (age 29–30); Indiana, United States
- Origin: Dublin, Ireland
- Genres: R&B, hip hop, dance, electronic, afrobeats
- Occupations: Singer; songwriter; dancer; actress; fashion model; TV presenter
- Years active: 2015–present
- Label: Columbia Records

Cassia O'Reilly (known professionally as Cosha and formerly known as Bonzai) is an Irish singer-songwriter and music producer.

== Background ==
O'Reilly was born in Indiana, United States, and raised in Ireland, between County Wicklow and Dublin. Her African-American descent mother was a singer and her Irish father was a drummer. She moved to London at age 17.

== Career ==
O'Reilly has worked with Eg White, Mura Masa and Rostam and Justin Raisen and toured with Flume.

== Discography ==
=== Albums ===
Mt. Pleasant (2021) (as Cosha)
No.	Title	Writer(s)	Producer(s)	Length
1.	"Berlin Air"	Cassia O'Reilly	Mura Masa; Cosha; Brett Shaw	3:54
2.	"No Kink In The Wire"	O'Reilly; Jacob Vetter; Johan Hugo	Cosha; JATA; Hugo; Koreless	5:30
3.	"Do You Wanna Dance?"	O'Reilly; Rostam Batmanglij	Rostam	3:26
4.	"Lapdance from Asia" (featuring Shygirl)	O'Reilly; Blane Muise; Zack Sekoff	Mura Masa; Cosha; Shaw; Koreless	3:28
5.	"Run the Track"	O'Reilly; Batmanglij	Rostam; Cosha	3:00
6.	"Tighter" (featuring Coby Sey)	O'Reilly; Alexander Crossan; Coby Sey; Emile Haynie; Loraine James; Patrik Berger	Cosha; Berger; Mura Masa; James	4:09
7.	"Hot Tub"	O'Reilly; Crossan; Nate Huff; Tobias Laust Hansen; Vilhelm Tiburtz Strange; Villads Tyrrestrup Øster	Cosha; Mura Masa	2:50
8.	"Bad Luck"	O'Reilly; Haynie	Cosha; Mura Masa; Haynie	3:45
Total length:				30:05

=== EPs ===
MurMurs (2024) (as Cosha)

All tracks are written by O'Reilly.

No.	Title	Producer(s)	Length
1.	"Fire Me Up"	Blacknoi$e; O'Reilly; Gabe Acheson; Sekoff	3:51
2.	"Royah & Halia"		0:54
3.	"Sun Back"	Mura Masa; O'Reilly; Acheson; James Massiah	4:14
4.	"Relish"	Mura Masa; O'Reilly; Acheson; Sam Knowles	3:32
5.	"Want You Back"	1Mind; O'Reilly; Acheson; Mura Masa; Sekoff	3:35
6.	"Perfect"	1Mind; O'Reilly; Mura Masa; Sekoff	3:35
7.	"MurMurs Interlude"	Mura Masa; O'Reilly	2:17
8.	"Glow"	O'Reilly; Acheson; Mura Masa; Sekoff	4:43
Total length:			26:25

=== Mixtapes ===
R.I.P. Bonzai (2018) (as Cosha)
No.	Title	Writer(s)	Producer(s)	Length
1.	"Do You Wanna Dance?"	Cassia O'Reilly; Rostam Batmanglij	Rostam	3:26
2.	"When U Call"	O'Reilly; Jeff Gitelman	Mura Masa; Gitelman	1:44
3.	"Bladerunnin'"	O'Reilly; Hugo	Mura Masa; Hugo; Tom Tripp	3:27
4.	"LUV"	O'Reilly; Batmanglij	Rostam	3:08
5.	"Brake Lights" (featuring NAO)	O'Reilly; Crossan; Neo Jessica Joshua; Daniel Traynor; Francis White	Mura Masa	2:20
6.	"Honey"	O'Reilly; Crossan; Daniel Eisner Harle	Mura Masa; Danny L Harle	3:31
7.	"Rare Fruit"	O'Reilly; Gitelman	Mura Masa; Gitelman; Kevin Tuffy	3:26
8.	"Sad Train Beat"	O'Reilly; Hugo	JATA; Hugo	3:53
9.	"Jaw Bone"	O'Reilly; Hugo	JATA; Hugo; Mura Masa	3:11
10.	"U Better"	O'Reilly; Traynor	Mura Masa; GRADES	1:52
11.	"This Life"	O'Reilly; Traynor	Mura Masa; GRADES	4:29
12.	"Flacko"	O'Reilly; James Harmen Stack	Mura Masa; Jim-E Stack; Kai Campos	4:35
Total length:				39:02

=== Extended plays ===
Royah (2015) (as Bonzai)
No.	Title	Writer(s)	Producer(s)	Length
1.	"Doses"	Cassia O'Reilly; Jonathan Calvert	Calvert	3:02
2.	"Nikka"	O'Reilly; Calvert	Calvert	3:18
3.	"Skhokho"	O'Reilly; Crossan	Mura Masa	2:40
4.	"Noise"	O'Reilly; Calvert	Calvert	3:47
Total length:				12:47

Lunacy (2016) (as Bonzai)
No.	Title	Writer(s)	Producer(s)	Length
1.	"I Did"	Cassia O'Reilly; Jonathan Calvert	John Calvert	3:09
2.	"Bodhran"	O'Reilly; Thomas Calvert	Redinho	2:49
3.	"2B"	O'Reilly; Alexander Crossan	Mura Masa	2:53
4.	"Ding Ding Ding"	O'Reilly; Crossan	Mura Masa	1:41
5.	"Cruel"	O'Reilly; Rebecca Louise Jones; J. Calvert	Calvert	3:24
Total length:				13:56

Sleep Hungry (2016) (as Bonzai)
No.	Title	Writer(s)	Producer(s)	Length
1.	"Daniel Gets It Wrong"	Cassia O'Reilly; Jonathan Calvert	John Calvert	2:01
2.	"No Rest"	O'Reilly; Calvert	Calvert	2:54
3.	"Ravemeister"	O'Reilly; Calvert	Calvert	0:26
4.	"Stepping"	O'Reilly; Calvert	Calvert	2:29
5.	"Kassi"	O'Reilly; Calvert	Calvert	2:59
6.	"Faze"	O'Reilly; James Luke Wood	Royce Wood Junior	3:38
7.	"Lights On"	O'Reilly; Alexander Crossan	Mura Masa	2:43
8.	"Sick 'Em"	O'Reilly; Calvert	Calvert	3:12
9.	"Where Are U Now"	O'Reilly; Crossan; Oliver Roddigan; Om'Mas Keith	Mura Masa; Cadenza	3:52
Total length:				24:14

=== Singles ===
==== As lead artist ====
- "I Did" (2016) (as Bonzai)
- "I Feel Alright" (2017) (as Bonzai)
- "Do You Wanna Dance" (2018) (as Cosha)
- "Luv" (2018) (as Cosha)
- "Flacko" (2018) (as Cosha)
- "No Kink in the Wire" (2020) (as Cosha)
- "Berlin Air" (2020) (as Cosha)
- "Lapdance from Asia" (2021) (as Cosha, featuring Shygirl)
- "Tighter" (2021) (as Cosha, featuring Coby Sey)
- "Run the Track" (2021) (as Cosha)
- "Sun Back" (2023) (as Cosha)
- "Want You Back" (2023) (as Cosha)
- "Fire Me Up" (2024) (as Cosha)
- "MurMurs Interlude" (2024) (as Cosha)

==== As featured artist ====
- "What If I Go?" (2016) (Mura Masa featuring Bonzai)
- "Nuggets" (2017) (Mura Masa featuring Bonzai)
- "Till the World Falls" (2018) (Nile Rodgers & Chic featuring Mura Masa, Cosha and Vic Mensa)
- "Thicc" (2023) (Shygirl featuring Cosha)

=== Songwriting credits ===
- "Porsche" (2017) (Charli XCX featuring MØ)
- "Unfold You" (2021) (Rostam)
- "Shlut" (2022) (Shygirl)
- "Coochie (a bedtime story)" (2022) (Shygirl)
- "Wildfire" (2022) (Shygirl)
- "Crush" (2023) (Shygirl, featuring Erika de Casier)
- "Woe (I See It From Your Side) (Björk Remix)" (2023) (Shygirl)
- "Playboy/Positions" (2023) (Shygirl)
- "rep 4 me" (2024) (Mura Masa)
