= Erika de Casier =

Danish singer

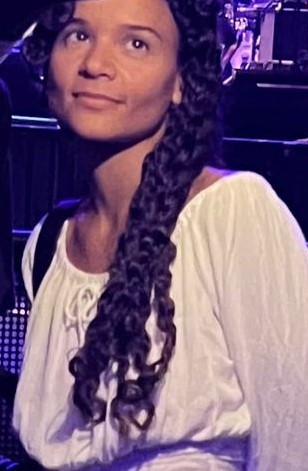
- De Casier in 2023

Background information
- Born: Erika de Casier e Ramos Lizardo; 1989 or 1990 (age 36–37); Portugal
- Origin: Copenhagen, Denmark
- Genres: Pop; R&B; Trip hop
- Occupations: Singer; songwriter; record producer
- Instrument: Vocals
- Years active: 2014–present
- Labels: Independent Jeep; 4AD
- Website: erikadecasier.com

Erika de Casier e Ramos Lizardo, known professionally as Erika de Casier, is a Portuguese-born Danish singer, songwriter, and record producer. She began her career performing as half of the R&B duo Saint Cava. After the duo disbanded, she independently released her debut studio album, Essentials, in 2019. She signed to British record label 4AD in 2020 and released her second studio album, Sensational, in 2021.

== Early life ==
Erika de Casier was born in Portugal to a Belgian mother and Cape Verdean father. She attended Catholic school until 1998 when, at age eight, she and her family moved to Denmark. (Note: While an interview with Crack states that she moved to Aarhus, interviews with Clash and Mixmag state that she moved to Ribe.) She mostly grew up around her mother. She was unable to speak Danish when her family first moved, and was bullied at school due to her and her brother being the only mixed race students. She spent time painting and watching MTV throughout her adolescence. At age 16, she spent a year living with a host family in the United States. Upon returning to Denmark, she joined her school's choir and band and began producing her own beats. After graduating from school, she moved to Copenhagen. Before performing as a solo artist, she worked at a kindergarten.

== Career ==
=== 2014–2019: Saint Cava and Essentials ===
Starting in 2014, de Casier performed with Andreas Vasegaard as part of the R&B duo Saint Cava. The duo performed at the Roskilde Festival in 2015 and released a string of singles through Danish record label Forbandet Ungdom before eventually disbanding. During this time, she also worked with the Danish electronic collective Regelbau after meeting Natal Zaks, a member of Regelbau, in Aarhus.

In 2017, de Casier released her debut single as an independent artist, "What U Wanna Do?", and released her second single, "Intimate", the following year. She released her debut studio album, Essentials, on 16 May 2019 through her own label, Independent Jeep Records, which spawned the two prior singles as well as the singles "Good Time" and "Do My Thing". Essentials was well received by critics, and appeared on several lists of the best albums of the year from publications including Vice, Crack Magazine, and Gorilla vs. Bear, which also named Essentials as one of the best albums of the 2010s.

=== 2020–present: Sensational, Still, and Lifetime ===
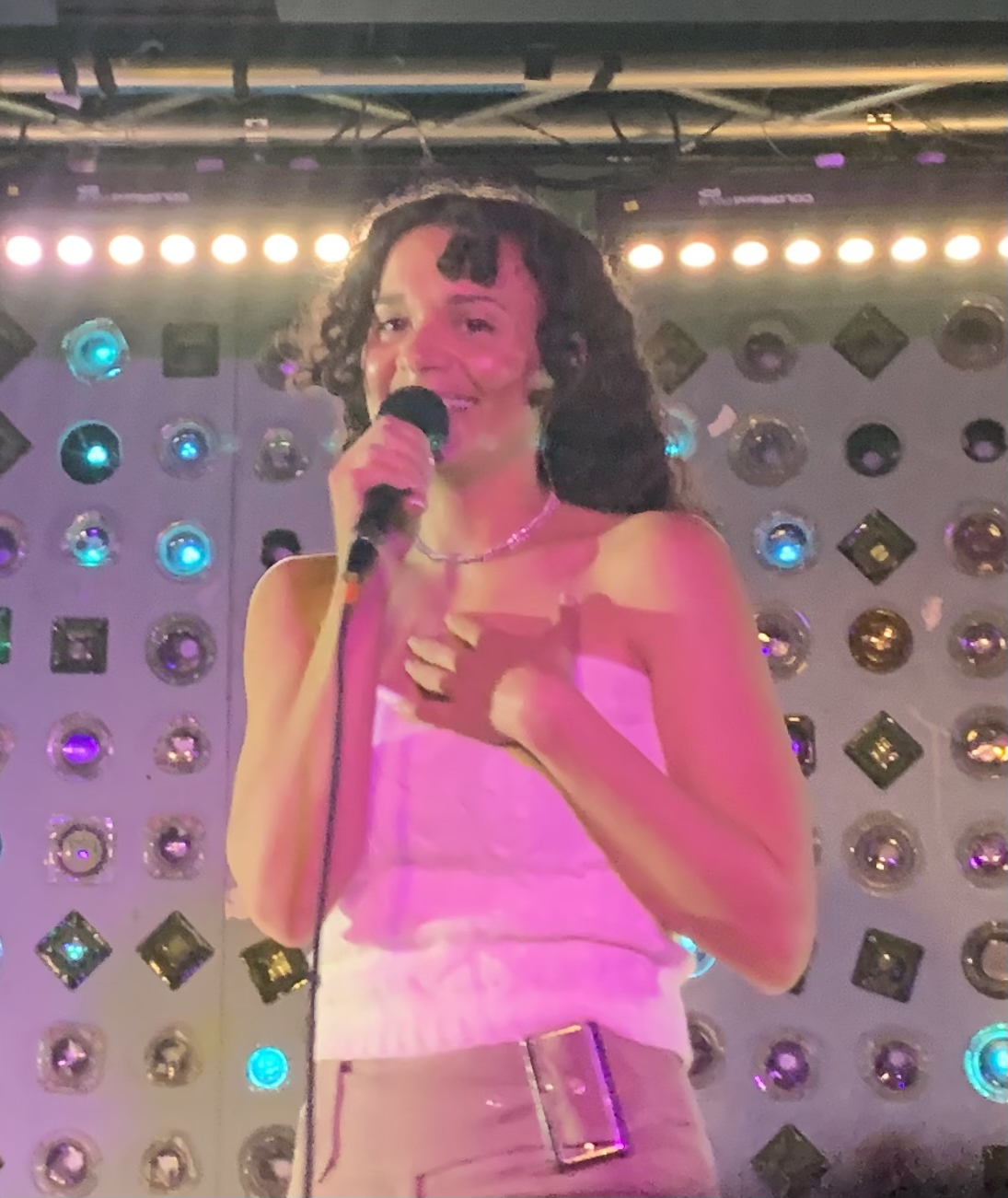
de Casier performing in 2022

During the beginning of the COVID-19 pandemic, de Casier experienced writer's block, but was later inspired by the pandemic and the Black Lives Matter movement to begin writing her second studio album, Sensational. She wrote and produced demos for each song independently before working with Zaks, who produced under the name El Trick, to complete them. Her April 2020 remix of English singer Dua Lipa's single "Physical" appeared on the remixes for the song after Lipa reached out to her. She performed a set for Boiler Room's Streaming from Isolation series in May 2020. In October 2020, she signed to UK record label 4AD and released her first single with the label, "No Butterflies, No Nothing", which also served as the lead single from Sensational, with a music video. The Fader named the single as one of the best songs of 2020.

In March 2021, de Casier released her second single from Sensational, "Drama", which Pitchfork named among the best songs of the year. She announced the title of Sensational and its scheduled release date, and released her third single from the album, "Polite", in April 2021. The fourth single from the album, "Busy", was released in May 2021. Music videos released for the last three singles and "Someone to Chill with" starred De Casier as her alter ego Bianka, a self-assured woman. Sensational was released on 21 May 2021 through 4AD. It was described by Mixmag's Patrick Hinton as "bolder and more assertive" than her debut album. Sensational entered the UK Hip Hop and R&B Albums Chart at number 13 and drew critical praise, appearing on year-end lists of the best albums compiled by The Guardian, Pitchfork and Dazed. In November 2021, she released The Sensational Remixes, a remix album of Sensational. "E-Motions", her single with British record producer Mura Masa from his 2022 studio album, Demon Time, was released in September 2022.

De Casier co-wrote several songs for K-pop girl group NewJeans's second EP, Get Up (2023), including the singles "Super Shy" and "Cool With You". De Casier said in an interview with GQ that it was her first time writing music for other artists, a process that she found "freeing". The EP and its singles were commercially successful and critically acclaimed; "Super Shy" was named among the best songs of the year by numerous publication, entering the top 10 in lists compiled by The Guardian, NME, Rolling Stone, and Pitchfork, among others. For their work on the EP, De Casier and fellow Danish songwriter Fine Glindvad were awarded Danish Songwriter of the Year at the Danish Music Awards 2023.

De Casier released her third studio album, Still, on February 21st, 2024.

Her fourth studio album, Lifetime, was surprise-released on May 8th, 2025. The album received positive reviews.

== Artistry ==
De Casier's music is mostly pop, contemporary R&B, and experimental pop, and has taken inspiration from music of the 1990s and early 2000s, incorporating genres such as G-funk, bossa nova, breakbeat, and trip hop. She has listed Avril Lavigne's 2002 album Let Go, Brandy and Monica's 1998 song "The Boy Is Mine", Craig David's 2000 album Born to Do It, and Aaliyah's 2001 self-titled album as influences on her music. She has cited Sade and Destiny's Child as groups that shaped her sound, while stating that Portishead, Tricky, and Mariah Carey influenced her vocals. She sings, writes, and produces much of her music. For Sensational, she developed an alter ego, the "fabulous", "Hausfrauen" Bianka.

== Activism ==
In April 2026, de Casier signed an open letter calling for a boycott of the Eurovision Song Contest 2026 due to Israel's participation amid its genocide in Gaza.

== Personal life ==
In 2021, de Casier earned a master's degree in Music Creation from the Rhythmic Music Conservatory, and presented parts of Sensational as her final project. She has described herself as "not a spiritual person at all".

== Discography ==
=== Studio albums ===
List of studio albums with selected details
| Title | Details |
|---|---|
| Essentials | Released: 16 May 2019; Label: Independent Jeep Records; Format: LP, CD, digital download, streaming |
| Sensational | Released: 21 May 2021; Label: 4AD; Format: LP, CD, digital download, streaming |
| Still | Released: 21 February 2024; Label: 4AD; Format: LP, CD, digital download, streaming |
| Lifetime | Released: 8 May 2025; Label: Independent Jeep Records; Format: LP, cassette, digital download, streaming |

=== Remix albums ===
List of studio albums with selected details
| Title | Details |
|---|---|
| The Sensational Remixes | Released: 12 November 2021; Label: 4AD; Format: LP, digital download, streaming |

=== Singles ===
List of singles, showing year released and album title
| Title | Year | Album |
|---|---|---|
| "What U Wanna Do?" | 2017 | Essentials |
| "Intimate" | 2018 | Essentials |
| "Do My Thing" | 2018 | Essentials |
| "Good Time" | 2019 | Essentials |
| "No Butterflies, No Nothing" | 2020 | Sensational |
| "Drama" | 2021 | Sensational |
| "Polite" | 2021 | Sensational |
| "Busy" | 2021 | Sensational |
| "Someone to Chill With" | 2021 | Sensational |
| "E-Motions" (with Mura Masa) | 2022 | Demon Time |
| "Lucky" | 2024 | Still |
| "Ice" (featuring They Hate Change) | 2024 | Still |
| "Ex-Girlfriend" (featuring Shygirl) | 2024 | Still |

=== Guest appearances ===
| Title | Year | Artist(s) | Album |
|---|---|---|---|
| "Relax & Run" | 2022 | Blood Orange, Eva Tolkin | Four Songs EP |
| "Crush" | 2023 | Shygirl | Nymph_o |
| "You're Not Alone" | 2023 | Courtesy, August Rosenbaum | Fra Eufori |
| "Bikini" | 2024 | Nick León | A Tropical Entropy |

=== Remixes ===
| Title | Year | Artist(s) |
|---|---|---|
| "Physical" | 2020 | Dua Lipa |

=== Songwriting credits ===
| Title | Year | Artist(s) | Album |
|---|---|---|---|
| "s.e.x.y.o.m.g." | 2022 | Jada, Debbie Sings | Elements |
| "New Jeans" | 2023 | NewJeans | Get Up |
| "Super Shy" | 2023 | NewJeans | Get Up |
| "Cool with You" | 2023 | NewJeans | Get Up |
| "ASAP" | 2023 | NewJeans | Get Up |
