= Number 1 (Linda Király album) =

#1

Studio album by Linda Király
- Released: December 1, 2003 (Hungary)
- Genre: R&B; soul; pop
- Length: 66:16
- Label: King Music Management

Singles from #1
- 1. "Szerelem utolsó vérig" Released: 2002; 2. "Clubsong" Released: 2002; 3. "Holla" Released: 2004; 4. "És mégis" Released: November 8, 2004

#1 is the first album by Hungarian singer Linda Király. Though it includes songs both in English and Hungarian, it was released only in Hungary, where it reached #19 on the official albums chart. It includes two of her previous hits, "Szerelem utolsó vérig" (the theme song of the movie of the same title) and "Clubsong" (feat. Pain), the theme song of a reality show.

== Track listing ==
| # | Title | Songwriters | Length |
|---|---|---|---|
| 1. | Intro | Simon Stewart | 1:36 |
| 2. | Use Me | Denzel Foster, Simon Stewart | 3:35 |
| 3. | Unconditional Love | J'-Marquis | 4:25 |
| 4. | A fák is siratják | Gábor Presser, Anna Adamis | 3:28 |
| 5. | Holla | Mousse T, Errol Rennalls | 3:00 |
| 6. | Szabadon élni | Presser, Dusán Sztevanovity | 3:34 |
| 7. | Két szív | Presser, Sztevanovity | 3:59 |
| 8. | Fast Lane | Simon Stewart, Linda Linda | 3:54 |
| 9. | Dreaming | Giovanni, Michael Whitwer, Linda Király | 4:44 |
| 10. | Tell It to the World | Simon Stewart, Shawn Hollingsworth | 4:29 |
| 11. | És mégis | Ákos Létray, Eszter Major | 4:33 |
| 12. | Másik igazság | Presser, Sztevanovity | 4:00 |
| 13. | Crush | Stewart | 3:33 |
| 14. | That Day | Stewart | 4:26 |
| 15. | Jumpin' My Ride | Errol Reid, Oliver Dommaschk, Marco Quast, Linda Király | 3:29 |
| 16. | Outro | Stewart | 0:32 |
| 17. | Szerelem utolsó vérig | Presser | 4:43 |
| 18. | Clubsong | Giovanni, Linda Keresztes, Linda Király, Pain | 3:44 |

== Singles with positions and track listings ==
Szerelem utolsó vérig (music video only) Clubsong (#2 on MAHASZ Single Top 10, #7 on Top 40 Airplay)

1. Clubsong 3:46
2. Clubsong (4U remix) 4:07
3. Clubsong (instrumental version) 3:46

Holla (music video & digital download only) És mégis (#25 on Top 40 Airplay)

1. És mégis
2. És mégis (Sun radio mix)
3. És mégis (Shane 54 unleashed remix)
4. És mégis (Shane 54 radio edit)
