= Shygirl =

British singer and DJ (born 1993)

- Shygirl in 2026

Background information
- Born: Blane Muise; 1993 (age 32–33); London, England
- Genres: Experimental pop; dance; hip-hop; electronic; club; deconstructed club; grime
- Occupations: Singer; songwriter; rapper; record executive; DJ
- Years active: 2016–present
- Labels: Nuxxe; Because Music
- Website: shygirl.tv

Blane Muise (born 1993), known professionally as Shygirl, is a British singer, DJ, rapper, songwriter and co-head/founder of record label and collective Nuxxe. Shygirl's music incorporates elements of dance music, hip-hop, experimental pop, grime and deconstructed club. She has also been associated with the hyperpop music scene.

Shygirl rose to prominence after working with close collaborator and friend Sega Bodega, as well as other well-known experimental producers Arca and Sophie, and gaining attention from the likes of Rihanna, who has used various Nuxxe tracks for her Fenty Beauty commercials and fashion shows. Shygirl has released various singles since 2016, and three EPs titled Cruel Practice, Alias and Club Shy. Her debut studio album Nymph was released on 30 September 2022 to widespread acclaim from music critics. Her second album, Swallow!, was released on 6 November 2026.

== Early life ==
Shygirl was born in South London and grew up around Blackheath. She is of Grenadian descent. She describes herself as a "total homebody" and "delving into fantasy and reading constantly" growing up. She was her secondary school's head girl. She went on to study practical photography at the University of Bristol, travelling back to London on the weekends for parties.

== Career ==
Shygirl released her first single "Want More", produced by Sega Bodega in 2016. This was the first song released on the Nuxxe label, founded by Shygirl, Sega Bodega, and Coucou Chloe. She went on to work with Sega Bodega on her singles "Msry" and "Nvr" in 2017, having featured on his song "CC" earlier in the year. In 2018, Shygirl quit her day job at a modelling agency to pursue her music career.

In May 2018, Shygirl released her debut EP, Cruel Practice, on Nuxxe. The EP received positive reviews from Pitchfork, Crack Magazine and Tiny Mix Tapes.

She featured on Arca's song "Watch" on her 2020 album, Kick I. The pair had previously collaborated on the song "Unconditional", with all of the proceeds from that single going towards Black Lives Matter and Inquest UK. In November 2020, she released her second EP, Alias on the Because Music label. This EP received positive attention from Pitchfork, Vogue and NME. Alias was listed as one of the best EPs of 2020 by audio and music publication MusicNGear.

In June 2021, Shygirl released a performance film titled "Blu". It featured performances of songs from her Alias EP, as well as a new song, titled "BDE" featuring British rapper slowthai. She released the song as a single the next day. She would later release the BDE 3XL remix EP in September. Shygirl and British producer Mura Masa were additionally featured on a remix of Lady Gaga and Blackpink's "Sour Candy" on Lady Gaga's Dawn of Chromatica remix album.

Shygirl released her debut studio album titled Nymph in 2022. The album received critical acclaim from NME, Crack Magazine and Pitchfork. On 15 September 2023, Shygirl was the opening act for the Sugababes' One Night Only concert at The O2 Arena. Shygirl appeared as opener across North America from 15 September 2024 to 23 October 2024, as part of the Sweat Tour with Charli XCX and Troye Sivan.

== Influences ==
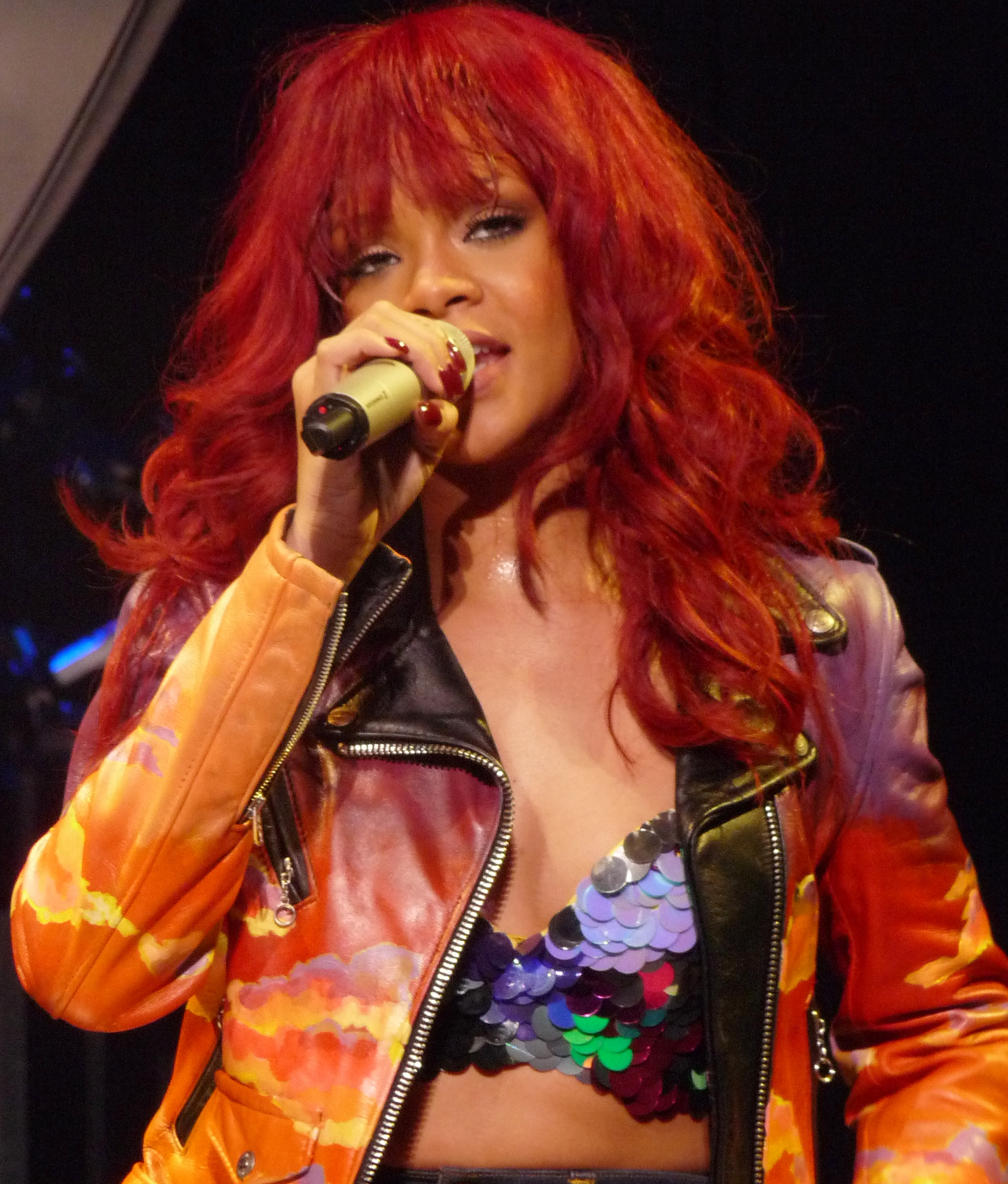
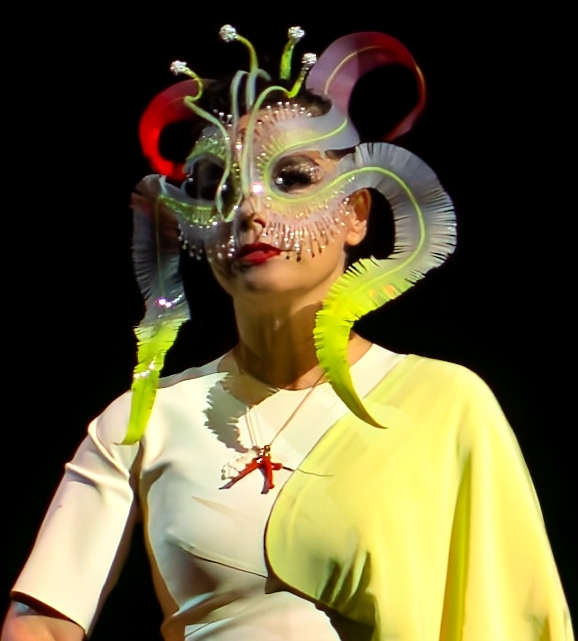
Shygirl's major musical influences include (left to right) Mariah Carey, Rihanna, and Björk.

Shygirl has listed Mariah Carey, Aphex Twin, Madonna, Rihanna, Björk, and Róisín Murphy as her biggest musical influences.

== Personal life ==
Shygirl identifies as queer.

== Discography ==
Shygirl discography
- Studio albums: 2
- EPs: 9
- Singles: 37
- Music videos: 18
- Remix albums: 3

=== Studio albums ===
Title	Details	Peak chart positions					
Title	Details	UK	UK Dance	SCO	US Dance	US Heat.	US Sales
Nymph	Released: 30 September 2022; Label: Nuxxe, Because Music; Formats: LP, CD, cassette, USB, digital download, streaming	34	1	12	7	10	64
Swallow!	Released: 6 November 2026; Label: Because Music; Formats: LP, CD, digital download, streaming	—	2	—	—	—	—

=== Remix albums ===
Title	Details
Nymph_o	Released: 14 April 2023; Label: Nuxxe, Because Music; Formats: LP, CD, digital download, streaming
Fabric Presents Shygirl (DJ Mix)	Released: 26 April 2024; Label: Fabric Records; Formats: LP, CD, digital download, streaming
Alias Is Me	Released: 21 November 2025; Label: Nuxxe, Because Music; Formats: LP, CD, digital download, streaming

=== Extended plays ===
Title	Details
Cruel Practice	Released: 25 May 2018; Label: Nuxxe; Formats: Digital download, streaming
Alias	Released: 20 November 2020; Label: Because Music, Nuxxe; Formats: Vinyl, digital download, streaming
Alias (Remixed)	Released: 12 June 2021; Label: Because Music, Nuxxe; Formats: Vinyl
Apple Music Home Session: Shygirl	Released: 20 September 2022; Label: Because Music; Formats: Streaming
Nymph in the Wild	Released: 28 July 2023; Label: Because Music; Formats: Digital download, streaming
Club Shy	Released: 9 February 2024; Label: Because Music; Formats: Vinyl, digital download, streaming
Club Shy RMX	Released: 7 June 2024; Label: Because Music; Formats: Vinyl, digital download, streaming
Club Shy Room 2	Released: 28 February 2025; Label: Because Music; Formats: Vinyl, digital download, streaming
Room 2 RMX	Released: 12 June 2025; Label: Because Music; Formats: Digital download, streaming

=== Singles ===
==== As lead artist ====
Title	Year	Album
"Want More"	2016	Non-album singles
"Msrynvr"	2017	Non-album singles
"O"	2018	Cruel Practice
"Gush"	2018	Cruel Practice
"Nasty"	2018	Cruel Practice
"Beauts"	2019	PDA Volume 1
"Uckers"	2019	Non-album singles
"BB"	2019	Non-album singles
"Unconditional" (with Arca)	2020	Nymph_o
"Freak"	2020	Alias
"Slime"	2020	Alias
"Lapdance from Asia" (with Cosha)	2021	Mt. Pleasant
"Tasty"	2021	Alias
"Siren"	2021	Alias
"BDE" (featuring Slowthai)	2021	Non-album singles
"Cleo"	2021	Non-album singles
"Firefly"	2022	Nymph
"Come for Me"	2022	Nymph
"Hollaback Bitch" (with Mura Masa and Channel Tres)	2022	Demon Time
"Coochie (A Bedtime Story)"	2022	Nymph
"Nike"	2022	Nymph
"Shlut"	2022	Nymph
"When You Wish Upon a Star"	2022	Non-album single
"Poison" (Club Shy Mix)	2022	Nymph_o
"Heaven" (featuring Tinashe)	2023	Nymph_o
"Woe (I See It from Your Side)" (Björk Remix)	2023	Nymph_o
"Playboy / Positions"	2023	Nymph_o
"Thicc" (featuring Cosha)	2023	Club Shy
"F@k€" (featuring Kingdom)	2023	Club Shy
"Tell Me" (featuring Boys Noize)	2024	Club Shy
"Mr Useless" (with SG Lewis)	2024	Club Shy
"Making the Beast"	2024	Fabric Presents Shygirl
"Encore" (featuring Danny L Harle)	2024	Club Shy RMX
"Immaculate" (featuring Saweetie)	2024	Club Shy Room 2
"F*Me" (featuring Yseult)	2024	Club Shy Room 2
"True Religion" (featuring Isabella Lovestory and PinkPantheress)	2025	Club Shy Room 2
"Sugar" (with SG Lewis)	2025	Anemoia
"Bawdy Is a Lot [Nick León + Six Sex]"	2025	Alias Is Me
"Alyse"	2026	Swallow!
"Lucky[Hymn]"	2026	Swallow!
"Mantra"	2026	Swallow!
"Eternal"	2026	Swallow!

==== As featured artist ====
Title	Year	Peak chart positions		Album
Title	Year	UK	NZ Hot	Album
"Bbycakes" (Mura Masa and PinkPantheress featuring Lil Uzi Vert and Shygirl)	2022	71	24	Demon Time
"Pressure" (Florentino featuring Shygirl)	2023	—	—	Kilometro Quinze
"Holier" (JD. Reid Remix) (Kelela featuring Shygirl)	2024	—	—	RAVE:N, The Remixes
"Look at My Body" (Mabel featuring Shygirl)	2024	—	—	Non-album singles
"Shark Brain" (Eartheater featuring Shygirl)	2025	—	—	Non-album singles
"Dolphin" (Eartheater featuring Shygirl)	2025	—	—	Non-album singles
"Satisfy" (LSDXOXO featuring Shygirl)	2025	—	—	DGTL ANML
"—" denotes items which were not released in that country or failed to chart.

=== Other charted songs ===
Title	Year	Peak chart positions				Album
Title	Year	CAN	NZ Hot	US Bub.	US Dance	Album
"Sour Candy" (Mura Masa remix) (Lady Gaga and Blackpink featuring Shygirl and Mura Masa)	2021	—	—	—	24	Dawn of Chromatica
"Papi Bones" (FKA Twigs featuring Shygirl)	2022	—	—	—	32	Caprisongs
"365" (Charli XCX featuring Shygirl)	2024	83	8	3	6	Brat and It's Completely Different but Also Still Brat
"—" denotes items which were not released in that country or failed to chart.

=== Guest appearances ===
Title	Year	Artist(s)	Album
"CC"	2017	Sega Bodega	Ess B
"Take the L"	2017	Lyzza	Powerplay
"Requiem"	2017	Sega Bodega	SS (2017)
"Mellow"	2018	Georgia	Seeking Thrills
"Juicy"	2019	Coucou Chloe	Naughty Dog
"Origami"	2019	LYAM, John Glacier	N_O Caller ID
"Raising Hell"	2020	Sega Bodega	Salvador
"Lick It n Split"	2020	Zebra Katz	Less Is Moor
"Watch"	2020	Arca	Kick I
"Sour Candy" (Shygirl and Mura Masa remix)	2021	Lady Gaga, Blackpink	Dawn of Chromatica
"Papi Bones"	2022	FKA Twigs	Caprisongs
"Ovule" (Sega Bodega remix)	2023	Björk	The Fossora Remixes
"Ex-Girlfriend"	2024	Erika de Casier	Still
"365 featuring Shygirl"	2024	Charli XCX	Brat and It's Completely Different but Also Still Brat

=== Music videos ===
Title	Year	Director(s)
"Gush"	2018	Shygirl and Samuel Ibram
"Nasty"	2018	Shygirl
"Uckers"	2019	Margot Bowman
"BB"	2019	Shygirl
"Freak"	2020	Shygirl
"Slime"	2020	Aidan Zamiri and Shygirl
"Siren" (lyric video)	2020	Shygirl
"Leng" (lyric video)	2020	Shygirl
"Tasty" (lyric video)	2020	Shygirl
"Bawdy" (lyric video)	2020	Shygirl
"Freak" (lyric video)	2020	Shygirl
"Twelve" (lyric video)	2020	Shygirl
"Tasty"	2021	Shygirl and Yasser Abubeker
"Blu" (Short film featuring Siren, Slime, Twelve, Freak, Bawdy, & BDE)	2021	Shygirl and Mischa Notcutt
"BDE"	2021	Shygirl
"Cleo"	2021	Trinity Ellis
"Cleo at Abbey Road"	2021	Ali Clifton
"Firefly" (Midnight Edition)	2022	Yasser Abubeker
"Come For Me" (Visualiser)	2022	Yasser Abubeker
"Firefly" (Dawn Edition; lyric video)	2022	Shygirl & Yasser Abubeker
"Coochie (a bedtime story)"	2022	Samuel Ibram
"Shlut"	2022	Diana Kunst
"Poison (Club Shy mix)"	2022	Samuel Ibram & Jacob Erland
"Heaven" (Remix; feat. Tinashe)"	2023	Actual Objects
"Woe (I See It From Your Side) (Björk Remix)"	2023	Samuel Ibram
"Playboy / Positions"	2023	Samuel Ibram
"Thicc" (featuring Cosha)	2023	Jake Erland
"Alyse"	2026	Shygirl, Francesco Loy Bell and Oliver Bell

== Awards and nominations ==
Award	Year	Category	Recipient(s) and nominee(s)	Result	Ref.
AIM Independent Music Awards	2021	Best Independent Track	"Tasty"	Nominated	
AIM Independent Music Awards	2022	Best Independent Track	"BDE" (Florentino Remix) (with Kaydy Cain)	Nominated	
AIM Independent Music Awards	2023	Best Independent Track	"Schlut"	Nominated	
AIM Independent Music Awards	2023	UK Independent Breakthrough	Herself	Won	
AIM Independent Music Awards	2023	Best Independent Album	Nymph	Nominated	
AIM Independent Music Awards	2025	Best Independent EP/Mixtape	Club Shy Room 2	Nominated	
Clubbing TV Awards	2025	Best Hits Video	"Look at My Body Pt. II" (with Mabel)	Nominated	
Clubbing TV Awards	2025	Best Complextro Video	"Holier" (JD. Reid remix) (with Kelela)	Nominated	
DJ Mag Best of British Awards	2024	Best Compilation	Fabric Presents Shygirl	Won	
Libera Awards	2023	Best Electronic Record	Nymph	Nominated	
Libera Awards	2026	Best Dance Record	Club Shy Room 2	Nominated	
Libera Awards	2026	Best Hip-Hop/Rap Record	"SLIME is BESTIE" (with JT & Sega Bodega)	Nominated	
MOBO Awards	2024	Best Electronic / Dance Act	Herself	Won	
MOBO Awards	2025	Best Electronic / Dance Act	Herself	Nominated	
Mercury Prize	2023	Album of the Year	Nymph	Nominated	
Music Week Awards	2024	Music & Brand Partnership	Shygirl (with H&M, Mugler & UTA)	Nominated	
Music Week Awards	2026	Catalogue Marketing Campaign	Herself	Pending	
Popjustice £20 Music Prize	2024	Best British Pop Single	"encore" (with Danny L Harle)	Nominated	
Queerty Awards	2025	Breakout Musical Artist	Herself	Nominated	
UK Music Video Awards	2024	Best R&B/Soul Video - UK	"Look at My Body Pt. II" (with Mabel)	Nominated	
