= Lifetime (Erika de Casier album) =

Studio album by Erika de Casier
- Released: 8 May 2025
- Recorded: August 2023 – November 2024
- Genre: Trip hop
- Length: 30:40
- Label: Independent Jeep
- Producer: Erika de Casier

Erika de Casier chronology
Still (2024)	Lifetime (2025)

Lifetime is the fourth studio album from Danish singer-songwriter Erika de Casier. It was surprise-released on 8 May 2025 through her own label Independent Jeep Music only a year after the release of her third studio album Still (2024).

== Background and release ==
De Casier wrote and produced the album entirely by herself between August 2023 and November 2024. It was mixed by Alonzo Vargas and mastered by Joe Laporta. In April 2025, she sold a series of unlabeled cassettes of the project through Bandcamp which would later be leaked on YouTube. The tapes were sold out in under thirty minutes and sparked speculations amongst fans and listeners about an upcoming album.

The singer-songwriter revealed that the working title was Midnight Caller which she aimed to be a "form of communication during the night". It reflects the feeling of time picking up the older one gets, growing aware of "mortality" and death but still "being grateful for what was, is, and will be". A press release presented Lifetime as a "testament to de Casier's singular taste", highlighting her "ability to pull from the past" to curate music "with intention" and a touch that is "uniquely hers".

== Critical reception ==
In a positive review for Resident Advisor, Hattie Lindert wrote that the album "crystallises [de Casier's] tastemaking without ever sacrificing style for substance". In a "confidently self-referential" way, de Casier was able to blend "boy band swagger with the whispery grooves of Cibo Matto" or even Sade. Lindert noted the artist's "timeless" sound with a production approach that focuses on "long builds and slow-fading outros".

== Track listing ==
All tracks are written by Erika de Casier.

Lifetime track listing
No.	Title	Length
1.	"Miss"	3:09
2.	"You Can't Always Get What You Want"	3:30
3.	"Seasons"	2:09
4.	"You Got It!"	1:54
5.	"December"	3:00
6.	"Delusional"	2:27
7.	"The Chase"	2:22
8.	"Moan"	2:39
9.	"The Garden"	3:02
10.	"Two Thieves"	3:22
11.	"Lifetime"	3:24
Total length:		30:40

== Personnel ==
Credits adapted from the album's liner notes.

- Erika de Casier – production
- Alonzo Vargas – mixing
- Joe LaPorta – mastering
- Xavier Luggage – cover photo
- Andreas Vasegaard – design
