= Alias (EP) =

2020 EP by Shygirl

EP by Shygirl
- Released: 20 November 2020
- Genres: Hip hop; industrial; R&B; Eurodance; pop
- Length: 19:12
- Labels: Because Music; Nuxxe
- Producers: Kai Whiston; Sega Bodega; Sophie; Oscar Scheller; Happa; Karma Kid

Shygirl chronology
Cruel Practice (2018)	Alias (2020)	Alias (Remixed) (2021)

Shygirl chronology
Alias (2020)	Alias (Remixed) (2021)	Apple Music Home Session: Shygirl (2022)

Singles from Alias
- 1. "Freak" Released: 2 September 2020; 2. "Slime" Released: 7 October 2020; 3. "Tasty" Released: 9 February 2021; 4. "Siren" Released: 16 March 2021

Alias is the second extended play by British rapper and singer Shygirl. The EP was released on 20 November 2020 through Because Music and Shygirl's own label Nuxxe. Following her 2018 debut EP Cruel Practice, Alias sees Shygirl enlist a diverse array of collaborators, including NUXXE co-founder Sega Bodega, Gloo's Kai Whiston, Oscar Scheller, Karma Kid, and the late producer Sophie. The EP received critical acclaim upon its release.

== Promotion ==
"Freak" was released as the first single from the on 2 September 2020 alongside a self-directed music video made in collaboration with CGI artist Maurice Anderson and 3D modeller Sy Blake. "Slime" was released as the second single on 7 October 2020. The EP was officially announced and put up for pre-order on 21 October 2020, with the "Slime" lyric video coming out the same day. The lyric video, filmed over FaceTime, features appearances from Sophie, Sega Bodega, Arca, Mowalola, and Ms. Carrie Stacks. A full music video for "Slime" came on 10 November 2020. From 25 November to 30 December, lyric videos for the EP's remaining six tracks were released.

An official music video for "Tasty" was released on 14 January 2021, featuring Shygirl in a mansion in the English country side inspired by fairytales, Disney Princesses, and Bridgerton. The song was officially released as the EP's third single on 9 February 2021, with an EP featuring remixes by Boys Noize and Lsdxoxo. "Siren" was released as the fourth single on 16 March 2021, alongside two remixes by Basement Jaxx.

== Title ==
The name Alias comes from the four alter egos that Shygirl adopts throughout the EP: Baddie, Bae, Bovine and Bonk. Bae is a girl next door blonde "who speaks to [Shygirl's] youth and the nostalgia of growing up in Southeast London". Baddie has a "bleak, dark sense of humor", and represents a more satirical side of the artist. Bonk is "colorful" and represents the innocent side of Shygirl "that is out for the fun in life." Bovine is aloof, with Shygirl saying "whenever I'm thinking about newer music and trying to discover different sides of myself, Bovine is that side, because she doesn't give away too much just yet." These characters are never named directly in the lyrics, but do appear in the music video for "Slime", as well as all lyric videos for the E.P. and the music video for 'Freak'.

== Composition ==
Alias is a hip hop, industrial, pop music, Eurodance, and R&B EP influenced by garage, house, grime, electroclash, and Eurobeat. The EP talks about themes of sex positivity, but a darker kind "where the pleasure comes from the danger that bubbles underneath a deadpan exterior".

Shygirl's voice is described as having "a dark-horse quality to it; her voice is buttery soft, but she handles lyrics with venomous precision, knowing when to bite and when to soften." This skill shows itself on "Bawdy" which sees the artist "fluctuate between ghastly clanging and unsettling whisper-crooning" Vocal effects also play a big role in the EP, pitched-up on "Twelve", harmonizing in a "cyborg cadence" on "Siren", and Auto-Tune-d and artificial on "Tasty".

Opening track "Twelve" is a call-and-response track with "an eerie saw-like synth that wouldn't score even the most haunting of Jordan Peele's horror moments". The Sophie-produced "Slime" has an "extraterrestrial club beat" built over a trap loop. "Tasty" is a UK garage song described as a "ravey piano banger" with "bouncing breakbeat production". "Leng" takes influence from grime as Shygirl "spits mile-a-minute bars" over "skittering" beats. EP closer "Siren" is a techno song that fuses 90s Eurodance, Europop, EDM, and the sound of the PC Music label.

== Critical reception ==
Professional ratings
Aggregate scores
Source	Rating
Metacritic	84/100
Review scores
Source	Rating
NME	4/5 stars
Paste	7.2/10
Pitchfork	7.5/10
Spectrum Culture	4/5 stars

Alias received a score of 84 out of 100 based on five reviews from review aggregate site Metacritic, indicating "universal acclaim". Writing for NME, Ben Jolley called the project "a maximalist joyride that sounds like it's been beamed in from the cyber-rave dancefloors of 2080" and "Alias proves that Shygirl is in full control of her artistic vision no matter the scale." Ashley Bardhan of Pitchfork praised the EP for its escapism amidst the COVID-19 pandemic, saying "In a year of no touching, these euphoric party moments feel far away, but Shygirl's endearing hedonism brings that sweaty room a bit closer. Alias is a glittering light, a portal into the future and everything you might do." Mick Jacobs wrote for Spectrum Culture, "Chock full of attitude, fun and menace, Shygirl's latest establishes a new, larger-than-life persona in addition to her trademark, detached cold-as-ice clubgirl."

== Track listing ==
Alias track listing
No.	Title	Writer(s)	Producer(s)	Length
1.	"Twelve"	Shygirl; Sega Bodega	Sega Bodega	2:32
2.	"Slime"	Shygirl; Kai Whiston; Sega Bodega; Sophie	Kai Whiston; Sega Bodega; Sophie	2:39
3.	"Freak"	Shygirl; Sega Bodega	Sega Bodega	2:47
4.	"Tasty"	Oscar Scheller; Sega Bodega	Oscar Scheller; Sega Bodega	2:24
5.	"Leng"	Shygirl; Happa	Happa; Sega Bodega	2:20
6.	"Bawdy"	Shygirl; Karma Kid	Karma Kid	2:34
7.	"Siren"	Happa; Sega Bodega	Happa; Sega Bodega	3:56
Total length:				19:12

Alias (Remixed) track listing
No.	Title	Writer(s)	Producer(s)	Length
1.	"Tasty"	Scheller; Sega Bodega	Scheller; Sega Bodega	2:24
2.	"Tasty" (Boys Noize remix)	Scheller; Sega Bodega	Scheller; Sega Bodega	3:50
3.	"Tasty" (Boys Noize extended dub)	Scheller; Sega Bodega	Scheller; Sega Bodega	6:31
4.	"Tasty" (Lsdxoxo remix)	Scheller; Sega Bodega	Scheller; Sega Bodega	2:58
5.	"Siren"	Happa; Sega Bodega	Happa; Sega Bodega	3:56
6.	"Siren" (Basement Jaxx Cruise remix)	Happa; Sega Bodega	Happa; Sega Bodega	5:37
7.	"Siren" (Basement Jaxx Joy Ride remix)	Happa; Sega Bodega	Happa; Sega Bodega	4:44
Total length:				30:00

Notes

- All track titles stylised in all caps

== Charts ==
Chart performance for Alias
Chart (2025)	Peak position
Scottish Albums (Official Charts)	95
UK Independent Albums (Official Charts)	30
