= Sensational (Erika de Casier album) =

2021 album by Erika de Casier

Studio album by Erika de Casier
- Released: 21 May 2021
- Recorded: 2020
- Genres: R&B; pop
- Length: 41:32
- Label: 4AD
- Producers: de Casier, Natal Zaks

Erika de Casier chronology
Essentials (2019)	Sensational (2021)	Still (2024)

Singles from Sensational
- 1. "No Butterflies, No Nothing" Released: 20 October 2020; 2. "Drama" Released: 2 March 2021; 3. "Polite" Released: 13 April 2021; 4. "Busy" Released: 12 May 2021; 5. "Someone to Chill With" Released: 17 September 2021

Sensational is the second studio album by Danish R&B singer-songwriter Erika de Casier. Written largely during the 2020 COVID-19 lockdown, the album conceptually centers on dispelling the stereotypes surrounding single women and dating, with many of the songs based on de Casier's personal experiences with bad partners. Its production draws inspiration from music of the late nineties and early 2000s, particularly pop and R&B artists such as Destiny's Child, Craig David, TLC, and Aaliyah, as well as UK garage music. De Casier co-produced the record with Natal Zaks.

The album was released on 21 May 2021 by British indie label 4AD, de Casier's first release with the label. Upon its release, Sensational drew widespread praise from music critics, who commended de Casier's vocals and songwriting, as well as the '90s and 2000s-influenced production. It was ranked by numerous publications as one of the best releases of the week, month, and first half of 2021. The album also spawned five singles, all of which drew favorable reviews from music critics and were promoted by music videos self-directed by de Casier. Four of the five videos starred de Casier playing the role of Bianka, her alter ego.

== Background ==
In 2019, de Casier self-released her debut studio album, Essentials. The album slowly drew attention, appearing on several critics' year-end lists and eventually receiving praise from English singer-songwriter Dua Lipa, who invited de Casier in 2020 to remix her single "Physical". De Casier began writing music for her second album in early 2020 while on tour, recording her first song of the project — "Call Me Anytime" — in one studio session while on tour. During this time, she also signed to the English indie label 4AD; de Casier had long admired the label for its work with the Cocteau Twins, and was pleased by the creative autonomy which they afforded her in writing music. She also noted that it had been expensive for her to self-finance the recording and release of her debut album, and that the experience had helped her to realize the benefits of working with a label and receiving outside help.

In early 2020, she was slated to tour further in Australia and the United States, but upon the emergence of the COVID-19 pandemic, she was forced to cancel the shows and isolate in Copenhagen; she then wrote and recorded the majority of the album during the COVID-19 lockdown, at the same time as she finished her final year of studies at university, working towards a Master's degree at the Rhythm Music Conservatory in Copenhagen. For one university project, de Casier presented several of the songs which would later appear on Sensational; she passed the assignment. While in isolation, de Casier initially experienced writer's block, but then "realised life doesn’t have to completely stop" and resumed her songwriting. In a July 2021 interview, de Casier stated that one of the differences between writing for her first and second albums was that, in writing Sensational, she aimed to make the songs' subjects more universal.

De Casier stated that she reflected on past relationships as she wrote the record, writing songs describing previous romantic endeavors. She elaborated to i-D that she "stood up for (her)self… I wanted to see myself as something other than the victim." She stated that a few words guided her as she wrote and recorded Sensational: "Sexy, sensual, sensational […] dramatic, as well. The idea of being extra, being over-dramatic and over-acting. I wanted to explore that." The album was regarded as being more diversified and self-confident than her debut. De Casier also drew influence from the music she heard on MTV growing up, reflecting that the TV station held extra significance for her as a young girl because it was "the only place (she) saw other Black people, growing up", as one of only two Black students at her school. De Casier also cited as an influence her visits as a child to the public library, where in the music section she was able to explore the work of artists such as Erykah Badu, N.E.R.D., and Destiny's Child. She singled out Craig David's Born to Do It and Aaliyah's eponymous album as particularly influential. For the album's production, de Casier collaborated with DJ Natal Zaks, with whom she had also collaborated on her debut, and who had created a club mix of her single "Intimate" under his El Trick stage name.

== Composition ==
=== Lyrics ===
The album's lyrical theme is addressing the stereotypes surrounding single women and dating. Critic Andy Kellman, writing for Allmusic, argued that despite its focus, the album contains "little innuendo" and instead focuses on de Casier's "expectations, anticipation, (and) disappointment". "Polite" details a real-life date with a rude lover; de Casier reflected that she should have simply left in protest, inspiring the lines "You gotta have some manners/If you wanna roll with me". The song, which has been described as "subtly groovy", references the 2Pac song "Ambitionz Az a Ridah", as well as a 50 Cent hook. "All You Talk About", a reference to Jennifer Lopez's 2001 single "Love Don't Cost a Thing", berates a lover who is overly materialistic. "Make My Day" mocks the idea of pickup lines at bars, with de Casier uttering lines—such as "When you fell from the sky, did it hurt?"—that are typically imagined as being said by men. On "Insult Me", which is thematically similar to "All You Talk About", de Casier informs her lover that "I can pave my way without you… I'm stronger than I look." Some of the songs also strike a less "coy" tone than on Essentials, such as on the tenth track, "Friendly". That song features the lyric "Take a bite of me/I got plenty of—", without finishing the line; some critics regarded the lyric as "suggestively" written, while others found it sounded like only "an invitation to hang out". Its lyrics also drew comparison to Janet Jackson's 1997 studio album, The Velvet Rope. "Busy" has been described as embodying a "boss-bitch persona" of a woman who is constantly working and too busy to date.

The album—particularly the song "Busy"—was also noted for its departures from the themes of single life and dating, and for its emphasis on self-love, chronicling de Casier's morning routine in "endearingly geeky" detail. It has also been noted that several of the songs appear to be sequels or extensions to those on Essentials: on "Puppy Love", from her first album, she sang "You're so sweet, put your butterflies around me", while on Sensational's "No Butterflies, No Nothing", she sings, "No, I'm far from it"; the Sensational track "Busy" was also regarded as a contrast to 2019's "Good Time", in which de Casier urges a lover to spend some time with her.

=== Music ===
The combination of retro musical sounds with modern lyrical themes was regarded as one of the album's defining features. Its stylistic influences were also regarded as expanded from her previous album: "Polite", which incorporates elements of Latin music, was compared to Sade, while de Casier's monotone rapping on the track was compared to that of Cassie. The production on "Call Me Anytime" was compared to t.A.T.u. and other Eurodance artists, and noted for its "subtle drum & bass beat". However, reviews by i-D and the Guardian regarded other songs on the album as a stylistic extension of Essentials and of late 1990s R&B, such as "Drama", with its guitar chords in the opening, similar to the openings of Destiny's Child's "Bills, Bills, Bills" and TLC's "No Scrubs"; "Better than That", which was also regarded as reminiscent of Destiny's Child; and the recurring harpsichord, similar to "The Boy Is Mine" by Monica and Brandy. "No Butterflies, No Nothing" has also been described as evoking Aaliyah's Timbaland-produced eponymous album.

In addition to drawing influence from retro R&B, several songs—such as "Better Than That" and "Someone to Chill With"—also draw inspiration from the period's trance music: "Busy" also draws inspiration from crossover UK garage music, being called "a wormhole back to Kiss FM circa 2001", while "Friendly" was regarded as inspired by Tricky and stylistically incorporates rainforest-inspired elements. Regarding the mood of "Friendly", de Casier reflected that partway through her writing the song, she went to sleep and had a dream set in a jungle, in which she was surrounded by waterfalls. She decided to recreate the feeling of the dream in the song, and eventually referred to it as her "Jungle ASMR track". "Insult Me" has been compared to the music of the 1990s Café del Mar compilation series. The album was also noted for its use of musical instruments and styles unusual in pop music, among them harp arpeggios on "Someone to Chill With" and a symphonic interlude on "Acceptance (Intermezzo)".

== Release ==
On 13 April, de Casier announced that her second album would be called Sensational and would be released on 21 May. It also marked her first release on 4AD Records. The album was digitally released by 4AD Records on 21 May, with a physical release on 23 July. De Casier also announced that in Fall 2021 she would be embarking on a European tour, and that club remixes of the tracks on Sensational were forthcoming.

=== Singles ===
To promote the album, four singles and music videos preceded its release. Lead single "No Butterflies, No Nothing" was released on 20 October 2020, becoming her debut single on 4AD; de Casier directed the accompanying music video. The Fader ranked the song as the fortieth-best of 2020; the song also attained a peak of number 92 on the global iTunes chart. On 2 March 2021, de Casier released the album's second single, "Drama", along with another self-directed music video. In a May 2021 interview, de Casier stated that the video is modeled on detective movies and reality television, and is shot to give the impression that it's from the point of view of a stalker. The song drew favorable reviews from Rolling Stone (who called it a "song you need to know") and Pitchfork. The song received some play on radio stations in three countries: public radio station DR P4 Østjyllands in Denmark, Radio Sudety 24 in Poland, and college radio station WKNC 88.1 FM in the United States.

"Polite" was released as the album's third single on 13 April 2021, with another self-directed music video as well as the announcement that her new album would be released on 21 May. Two months after its release, the song was featured on a Toronto Star playlist highlighting "new tracks you need to hear". The song reached number 32 on the Apple Music Chart, as well as number 66 on the global iTunes chart. It also went into rotation on national Austrian radio station FM4 and Polish station PR Radio RAM 89.8. De Casier released the album's fourth single, "Busy", on 12 May, with a slideshow in lieu of a music video. The song was ranked one of the "10 New Songs You Need to Hear Now" by Paper, who deemed it one of the year's best pop songs; in July, Harper's Bazaar included it in their list of the "Best Summer Songs to Add to Your Playlists Now". The single received play on four American radio stations, as well as the New Zealand station 8K Christchurch.

The music videos for the last three singles, beginning with "Polite", all star Bianka, a fictional character created by de Casier who is the CEO of the "Sensational Corporation". De Casier reflected in an interview with MixMag that she had initially been hesitant to appear in the music videos for her new album's singles, but that then "I ordered this wig from a party site, and when I put it on I just felt very empowered". Bianka's persona of a modern woman looking for love was regarded as an extension of the album's themes, and has been likened to de Casier's own Sasha Fierce or Ziggy Stardust.

On 17 September 2021, de Casier released the album's fifth single, "Someone to Chill With", with an accompanying music video and announcement of expanded tour dates in the UK, Scotland, Denmark, the Netherlands, and the Czech Republic. The music video was filmed by Stephanie Stål Axelgård and directed by de Casier, and depicts Bianka at the beach. The video had been initially premiered at the electronic music festival STRØM in Copenhagen in August 2021.

== Critical reception ==
Professional ratings
Aggregate scores
Source	Rating
Metacritic	78/100
Review scores
Source	Rating
Allmusic	3.5/5 stars
Clash	8/10
Crack	8/10
DIY	3/5 stars
Financial Times	4/5 stars
The Guardian	4/5 stars
Loud and Quiet	7/10
No Ripcord	8/10 stars
Pitchfork	7.7/10
Sputnikmusic	4/5

Upon its release, the album drew praise from music critics, earning a score of 78 out of 100 on review aggregate site Metacritic, denoting "generally favorable reviews". The album was ranked as one of the best releases of the week by multiple publications, being named the best album of the week by Stereogum and the Guardian, one of the six "New Albums You Should Listen to Now" by Pitchfork, one of the "7 projects you should stream now" by The Fader, and one of "The Top 6 Albums Out On May 21" by National Public Radio. Writing for Clash, critic Megan Walder awarded the album a score of eight out of ten, writing that de Casier had been "able to keep up the momentum that she had established" with Essentials and commending de Casier for "producing a sound that would comfortably fit alongside the greats she once listened to on her Walkman". Walder went on to note "Make My Day", "Polite", and "No Butterflies, No Nothing" as highlights. The Guardian awarded the record four stars out of five as well, with critic Alexis Petridis commending de Casier's "wit and originality" in detailing failed relationships, and concluding that the album consists of "music that looks to the past, made by an artist too original to be a revivalist". In the Financial Times, Ludovic Hunter-Tilney noted that the album could be played in the sort of fancy restaurant at which "Polite" is set, and commended the record for being tasteful but not dull; Hunter-Tilney ultimately awarded the album four stars out of five. Paper deemed the album "phenomenal" and included "Someone to Chill With" as one of the "10 New Songs You Need to Hear Now" for the week.

In a less favorable review, critic Louisa Dixon, writing for DIY, awarded the album three stars out of five, singling out "Drama", "Busy", "Polite", and "Someone to Chill With" as highlights but accusing the album of "get(ting) a little samey" in places due to de Casier's "understated vocal" and the "shallow pool from which many of the musical textures come".

=== Accolades ===
In June 2021, Paste ranked Sensational as one of the ten best albums released in May 2021, praising her for "balancing herself on the same tightrope as her inspirations between relatability and luxury" and the record's "humility" and "confidence". In June, the Guardian ranked it one of their best-reviewed albums of the previous month. In July 2021, Bandcamp ranked the album among "The Best Albums of Spring 2021". Also that month, DJ Mag named Sensational their "Album of the Month", with critic Eoin Murray calling it a "striking" album that suggests that de Casier "will have no trouble dominating dance floors as well as charts".

Numerous outlets ranked the album as one of the best or most underrated releases of the first half of 2021. In June 2021, the Guardian, Our Culture Mag, and Clash included the album on their lists of "The Best Albums of 2021 So Far", "The 30 Best Albums of 2021 (So Far)", and "The Best Albums Of 2021 (So Far...)", respectively. The Christian Science Monitor mentioned the album in a June 2021 story about "2021's Best Albums So Far". In July, Nylon featured the album on a list of "12 Criminally Underrated Music Releases of 2021 So Far", with critic Steffanee Wang writing that the songs "linger like a plume of expensive perfume" and singling out "Drama" and "No Butterflies, No Nothing" as highlights. Stereogum ranked the album at number 34 on their list of the "50 Best Albums of 2021 So Far", published in June; critic James Rettig commended the album as "understated but powerfully evocative" and singled out its production as noteworthy.

In December 2021, Pitchfork placed it at number 40 on their "The 50 Best Albums of 2021" list, whilst The Guardian placed it at number 37 in their similar list, with Laura Snapes stating that de Casier's "minimalist take on turn-of-the-millennium R&B shivers with sensitivity... while (her) coy delivery brims with a beguiling sense of mystery".

== Track listing ==
All tracks are written by Erika de Casier and produced by de Casier and Natal Zaks, except "Insult Me" and "Call Me Anytime", written and produced by de Casier.

Sensational track listing
No.	Title	Length
1.	"Drama"	3:48
2.	"Polite"	3:24
3.	"Make My Day"	3:29
4.	"All You Talk About"	3:01
5.	"Insult Me"	3:18
6.	"No Butterflies, No Nothing"	2:59
7.	"Someone to Chill With"	3:19
8.	"Acceptance (Intermezzo)"	0:41
9.	"Better Than That"	3:56
10.	"Friendly"	3:00
11.	"Secretly"	3:04
12.	"Busy"	3:59
13.	"Call Me Anytime"	3:34
Total length:		41:32

== Charts ==
Chart performance for Sensantional
Chart (2021)	Peak position
UK R&B Albums (Official Charts)	13

== Remix EP ==
The Sensational Remixes

EP by Erika de Casier
- Released: 12 November 2021
- Length: 31:48
- Label: 4AD
- Producers: caro♡; Smerz; Mura Masa; Chicken; Eartheater; They Hate Change; Nick León; Natal Zaks; DJ G2G

Erika de Casier chronology
Sensational (2021)	The Sensational Remixes (2021)	Still (2024)

Singles from The Sensational Remixes
- 1. "Drama (Isabella Lovestory & Chicken Remix)" Released: 4 November 2021

A remix EP, titled The Sensational Remixes, slated for digital release on 12 November 2021, was announced for release on 4 November 2021. It was preceded by the single release of Spanish artist Isabella Lovestory & record producer Chicken's remix of "Drama" on 4 November 2021.

=== Track listing ===
No.	Title	Length
1.	"Better Than That" (Hannah Diamond & caro♡ Remix)	3:41
2.	"Friendly" (Smerz Remix)	3:45
3.	"Polite" (Mura Masa Remix)	3:50
4.	"Drama" (Isabella Lovestory & Chicken Remix)	2:54
5.	"Someone to Chill With" (Eartheater Remix)	3:22
6.	"Call Me Anytime" (They Hate Change Remix)	2:54
7.	"Friendly" (Nick León Remix)	2:59
8.	"Polite" (Natal's latenitemix)	3:15
9.	"Busy" (DJ G2G SUPERMIX)	5:08
Total length:		31:48
