= Linda Király =

Hungarian singer and songwriter (born 1983)

- Born: 28 February 1983 (age 43); Bronx, New York, U.S.
- Origin: Budapest, Hungary
- Genres: Pop; R&B
- Occupations: Singer; songwriter
- Years active: 2002–present
- Labels: Time Warner; Universal Records
- Website: www.kiralylinda.hu

P. Linda Király (born 28 February 1983), is a Hungarian-American singer and television host. She sings both in English and in Hungarian. She is the older sister of Hungarian-American singer-songwriter Viktor Király.

== Biography ==
Linda Király is the second eldest of four children of musician Tamás Király. Her younger brother, Viktor Király, is also a singer and appeared as a contestant on season 9 of the NBC reality singing program The Voice. She grew up in New York and has been pursuing a singing career since childhood. She moved to Hungary with her family in 1999 and became famous nationwide when she sang the title song for the movie Szerelem utolsó vérig (Love Till Last Blood). The song was written by Gábor Presser. Her next hit was "Clubsong", the main theme from the Hungarian version of Big Brother. She also played Christine in The Phantom of the Opera, and was preparing to release her debut album.

In December 2003, her first album, titled #1 was released. The album included nine songs in English, five in Hungarian, plus the hits "Szerelem utolsó vérig" and "Clubsong". She released two singles, "Holla" and "És mégis". The next songs she recorded were "Lesz-e napsugár még?", the Hungarian version from the Disney movie Home on the Range, and the 2004 summer Olympics song "Olimpiai dal", a duet with Megasztár singing contest winner László Gáspár.

In autumn 2004, Király moved to London where she was working on her first full English-language album. She got a contract with Universal Music, then moved to the United States. "Can't Let Go", her first single, on which she worked with Darkchild was released in July 2007. "Can't Let Go" currently has over 2.3 million views on YouTube.

An announced international album was never released and currently her activities remain limited to her home country.

== Discography ==
=== Albums ===
- #1 (2003; #19 on MAHASZ Top 40 Album Chart, Hungary)

=== Singles ===
- "Szerelem utolsó vérig"
- "Clubsong" (#2 on MAHASZ Single Top 10, #7 on Top 40 Airplay)
- "Holla"
- "És mégis" (#25 on Top 40 Airplay)
- "Játszom, ahogyan lélegzem" (duet with Charlie) (#5 on Top 40 Airplay)
- "Olimpiai dal 2004" (duet with László Gáspár) (2004) (#2 on MAHASZ Single Top 10, #11 on Top 40 Airplay)
- "Can't Let Go" (2007) (#2 on MAHASZ Single Top 10, #4 on Top 40 Airplay)
- "Love Is Overrated" (2011) (#29 on Top 40 Airplay)
- "Untried" (2012) (#6 on Top 40 Airplay)
- "Runaway (Beautiful Tragedy)" (2013) (#6 on Top 40 Airplay)
- "Everything" (2013)

== See also ==
- Hungarian pop

== Sources ==
- MAHASZ.hu archive – official charts in Hungary
