= Sour Candy (Lady Gaga and Blackpink song) =

2020 song by Lady Gaga and Blackpink

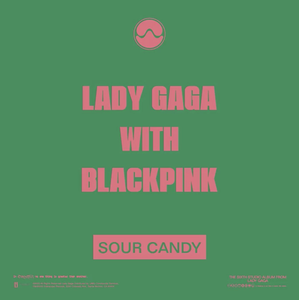
- Promotional graphic

Promotional single by Lady Gaga and Blackpink

from the album Chromatica
- Language: English; Korean
- Released: May 28, 2020
- Studio: Henson (Los Angeles)
- Genre: Deep house; dance-pop; electropop
- Length: 2:37
- Label: Interscope
- Songwriters: Lady Gaga; BloodPop; Matthew Burns; Rami Yacoub; Madison Emiko Love; Park Hong-jun
- Producers: BloodPop; Burns

Lyric video
- "Sour Candy" on YouTube

"Sour Candy" is a song by American singer Lady Gaga and South Korean girl group Blackpink. It was released for digital download and streaming on May 28, 2020, as a promotional single off Gaga's sixth studio album, Chromatica. The song was written by Gaga, Madison Love, Rami Yacoub, Teddy Park, and its producers BloodPop and Burns. It is a deep house, dance-pop and electropop song with a house, dance and electronic beat and lyrics which compare the artists to the titular sour candy, stating that they are tough on the outside but sweet and authentic on the inside.

"Sour Candy" received a mixed reception, with many critics praising its catchy, danceable production and the blend of Gaga and Blackpink's styles, while others criticized it as flat, derivative, or lyrically weak. The song reached number one in Malaysia and Singapore and the top ten in Australia, Estonia, Greece, Hungary, and Lithuania. A remix version of "Sour Candy" by Shygirl and Mura Masa appeared on Gaga's remix album, Dawn of Chromatica (2021). Both Blackpink and Gaga have performed the song separately on their live events, The Show (2021) and The Chromatica Ball (2022), respectively.

== Background and development ==
"Sour Candy" is a collaboration between American singer Lady Gaga and South Korean girl group Blackpink, appearing on the former's sixth studio album, Chromatica (2020). The track originated in an early writing session unrelated to the album, led by Madison Love with BloodPop, Rami Yacoub, and Burns. Love explained that the team began by riffing on a chorus built around the title "Sour Candy", inspired by the "sour, then sweet" concept of Sour Patch Kids commercials. They drafted the chorus and a short verse intended for a featured artist, with Blackpink already in mind. BloodPop later played the demo for Gaga, who—according to Love—responded enthusiastically, reworked the material "into her song", and suggested involving Blackpink.

In an interview with the Japanese outlet TV Groove, Gaga discussed the collaboration's development. She recalled that when she reached out to Blackpink about working together, they were "so happy and motivated", describing the process as "a really exciting collaboration". Gaga said she wanted to celebrate the group and appreciated hearing them interpret the song in Korean, calling their contribution "creative and fun".

Blackpink's management also commented on the partnership, noting that both artists had become fans of each other's music, which made the collaboration develop "naturally".

== Music and lyrics ==
"Sour Candy"
A 20-second excerpt of "Sour Candy" highlighting Lady Gaga's deadpan delivery layered over its house-inspired production.

"Sour Candy" is a 1990s-influenced dance-pop, electropop, bubblegum pop and deep house track with upbeat production, built on a bouncy house, dance and electronic beat. In the song, Blackpink and Gaga trade flirty lines in English and Korean, with Blackpink opening the track and Gaga appearing midway to perform one pre-chorus and a verse. The lyrics use sour candy as a metaphor, illustrating how the singers function in relationships—tough on the outside but sweet and authentic on the inside—and encourage a potential lover to accept their flaws rather than try to change them. Vulture noted that the song carries a simple message of self-acceptance. Nylon remarked it has "in-on-the-joke cheeky lyrics". The '90s house-style drop features Gaga singing in a deadpan tone, described as "speak-rap" by Entertainment Weekly, while Blackpink's verses incorporate "tight, almost mechanical melodies".

"Sour Candy" samples Maya Jane Coles' 2010 track "What They Say", using the same bassline that also appears in Nicki Minaj's "Truffle Butter" (2015) and Katy Perry's "Swish Swish" (2017). According to the sheet music published on Musicnotes.com, the song is written in the time signature of common time, and is composed in the key of A minor with a tempo of 120 beats per minute. The vocals range from the tonal nodes of G_{3} to C_{5}.

== Release and promotion ==
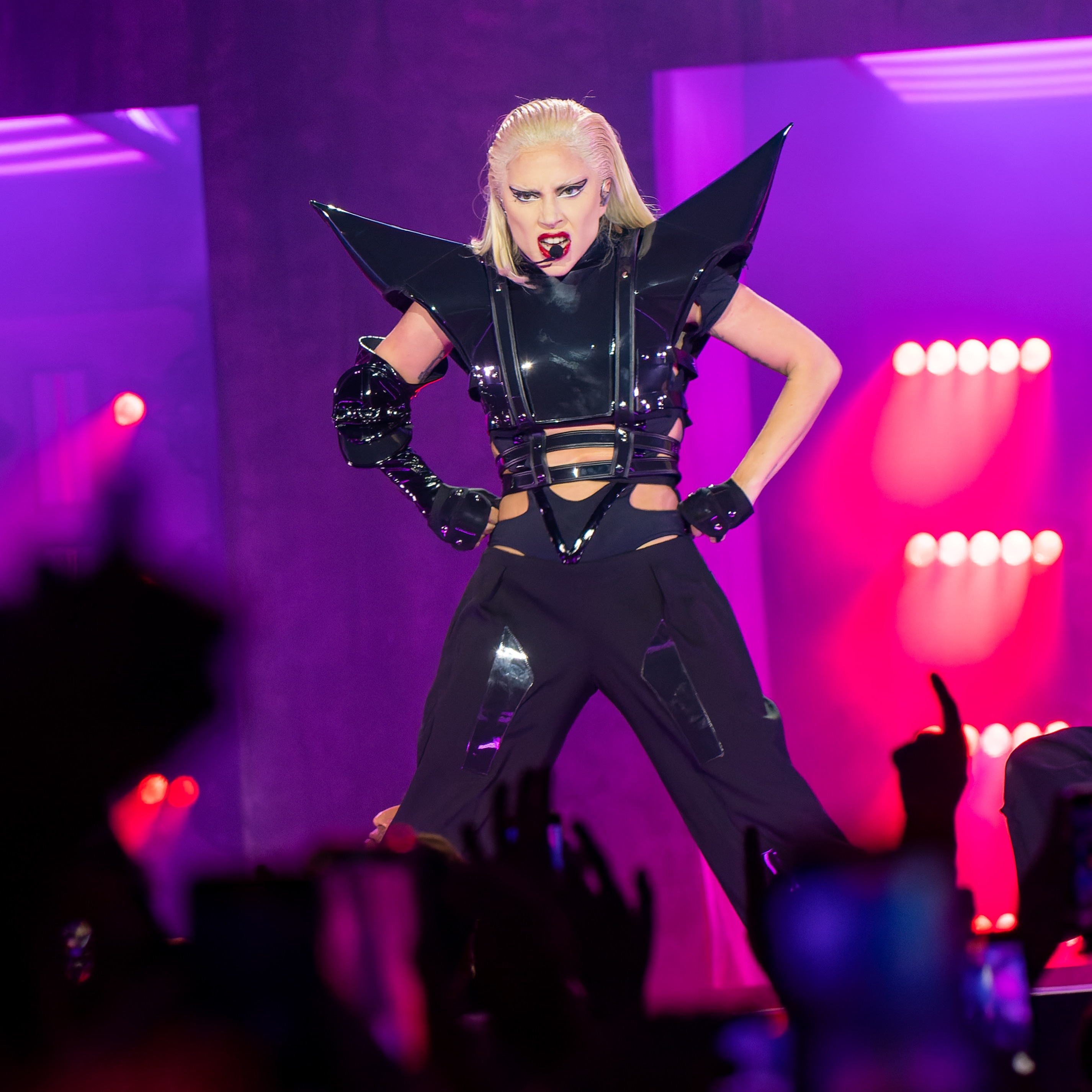
Lady Gaga performing "Sour Candy" on The Chromatica Ball tour, 2022

"Sour Candy" was released on May 28, 2020, a day before the album, as a promotional single. It was followed by a lyric video on June 16. The visual depicts a candy-colored, surreal digital environment; Rolling Stone observed that the lyrics appear "Matrix-style" while Billboard characterized the imagery as "a Willy Wonka-worthy color explosion" featuring glowing, futuristic forms.

"Sour Candy" was first performed by Blackpink on January 31, 2021, during their livestream concert, The Show. The performance featured choreography, pink outfits, male backup dancers, and elements of light voguing. Lady Gaga did not appear in person; a CGI figure was projected on an LED screen during her sections of the song. Teen Vogue's P. Claire Dodson felt the rendition featured "choreo as lively and energetic as this candy-colored song deserves".

In 2022, Gaga sang "Sour Candy" at The Chromatica Ball stadium tour. She appeared in a vinyl dominatrix ensemble, and opened the choreographed performance by asking the audience, "Are you a hard, gummy, or a stringy candy?". VIP ticket holders on the tour received custom "Sour Candy" lollipops, with the lyrics "You Want a Real Taste" printed on the packaging. Gaga's solo rendition appears in the 2024 concert film Gaga Chromatica Ball, and both Entertainment Weekly's Joey Nolfi and The Daily Beast's Coleman Spilde singled it out as one of the release's highlights. Nolfi praised Gaga's "inventive vocal acrobatics", noting that the sequence where she is moaning into the microphone at the start of the song was preserved for the film, while Spilde lauded the segment for its unembellished theatricality and Gaga's energetic delivery.

== Critical reception ==
Entertainment Weekly's Joey Nolfi described "Sour Candy" as an "epic collaboration" and "a mouthwatering serve". Michael Roffman from Consequence of Sound called it "another banger" from Gaga saying it proves Chromatica "will bring the party to our pandemic." Claire Shaffer from Rolling Stone deemed it "a sugar-sweet club track for all our at-home parties, while Variety's Jem Asward highlighted it is "a sparkling combination of the two artists' styles". Zoe Haylock of Vulture praised the song for having lyrics that could "basically all be Instagram captions", and considered it strong pop. Kristen S. Hé from the same outlet added that Blackpink's vocals, "sweet yet full of attitude", play off Gaga's earthy tone atop a sleek, catwalk-ready house beat. Cole Delbyck of HuffPost wrote that the song is successfully "fusing Gaga and Blackpink's distinct sounds into one dance-floor-primed [...] bop" and "lives up to the hype" surrounding the long-anticipated collaboration. Louise Bruton of The Irish Times called it "the perfect mix of weirded-out pop and euphoria". Patrick Ryan of USA Today considered the "sultry" track the strongest of the three collaborations on Chromatica.

Stephen Daw of Billboard commended "Sour Candy" for giving each participant "equal, well-balanced time", though he felt that something was missing that "could have rounded out" the song. In contrast, Michael Cragg of The Guardian argued that it "falls disappointingly flat" and sounds like "a dashed off, cheaply produced interlude". Sal Cinquemani of Slant Magazine dismissed it as "empty-calorie", and Evan Sawdey of PopMatters considered it one of the album's "lesser songs", albeit "blissfully short". Adam White of The Independent described the track as catchy but criticized its "sparse house beat" and "limp metaphorical lyrics about being hard on the outside but soft in the middle", likening it more to a Katy Perry single than something meeting Gaga's usual standard. Katherine St. Asaph of Pitchfork deemed the track "sassy enough" but felt it was "out of place" on the album, while Nicholas Hautman of Us Weekly wrote that it "leaves much to be desired". Both Asaph and Hautman noted that the track feels derivative, pointing to its similarity to other pop songs built on the same Maya Jane Coles sample.

== Commercial performance ==
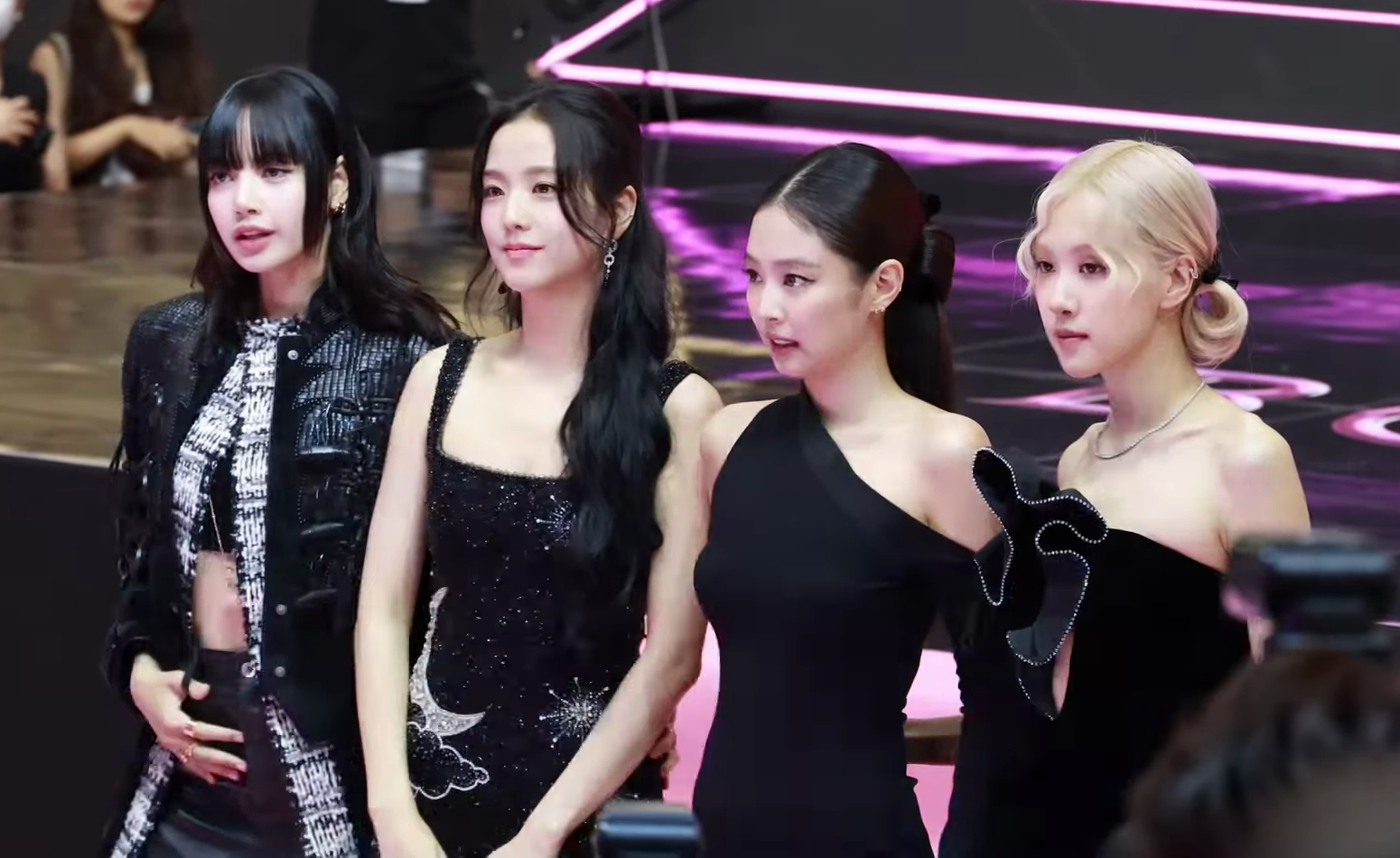
"Sour Candy" marked the first time Blackpink appeared on Billboard's Hot Dance/Electronic Songs chart.

"Sour Candy" debuted on numerous international charts. In the United States, it entered the Billboard Hot 100 at number 33, becoming Gaga's 25th top-40 hit and Blackpink's first. It also reached number three on the Hot Dance/Electronic Songs chart, marking the first time Blackpink appeared on the chart, also the first entry by a South Korean girl group there overall. The song went on to maintain a notable presence on the chart well beyond its debut. Several months after release, it was still rising, moving from number 19 to number 16 in one of its later weeks. Its sustained performance resulted in a 20-week run, placing it alongside Psy's "Daddy" (with CL) and "Gentleman", as well as Steve Aoki's "Waste It On Me" featuring BTS, as one of the longest-running songs by South Korean acts on the Hot Dance/Electronic Songs chart. With an impending twenty-first week, it was poised to match Psy's "Hangover" (with Snoop Dogg) for the longest chart duration among releases by South Korean artists on that list.

In Canada, the track debuted at number 18 on the Canadian Hot 100. In the Asia–Pacific region, the song topped the charts in Malaysia and Singapore. It reached number 8 in Australia, Blackpink's first top-ten in the country, and number 12 in New Zealand. In Japan, it peaked at number 43 on the Japan Hot 100.

In Europe, "Sour Candy" debuted at number 17 on the UK Singles Chart, becoming Blackpink's first top-twenty entry there. The song achieved its highest continental peaks in Hungary, reaching number 4 on the Single Top 40, followed by number 5 in Lithuania and number 10 on Greece's International chart. It also reached the top twenty in Estonia, Ireland, the Czech Republic and Slovakia. Elsewhere in Europe, the track charted at number 30 in Switzerland 46 in both Italy and Spain, and 62 in France.

== Remix ==
For Gaga's third remix album, Dawn of Chromatica (2021), "Sour Candy" was remixed by English singer Shygirl and Guernsey producer Mura Masa. The remix retains vocal contributions of Blackpink's Rosé and Lisa only, removing those of Jennie and Jisoo. Joey Nolfi of Entertainment Weekly described the track as "a decadent interpretation of 'Sour Candy' [...] that'll make it easy to pucker up to the dance floor for a new groove on a familiar cut."

Shygirl said she didn't know Gaga personally—the collaboration came through BloodPop, who originally offered her a different track. She specifically requested "Sour Candy", calling it the best option for her. Although she loved the song, she felt the original didn't fully go where it could, describing it as feeling like an "appetizer". Having never made a remix before, she chose to work with Mura Masa, someone she trusts and has strong musical chemistry with. Shygirl acknowledged that some listeners found "Sour Candy" "cheesy", but said she personally loves that kind of music and that it feels very true to her. She has included her version of the song in her live performances.

== Accolades ==
Awards and nominations
| Organization | Year | Category | Result | Ref. |
|---|---|---|---|---|
| BreakTudo Awards | 2020 | Collaboration of the Year | Nominated | |
| MTV MIAW Awards Brazil | 2020 | Best International Feature | Won | |
| WOWIE Awards | 2020 | Outstanding Collaboration Song | Won | |

== Credits and personnel ==
Credits adapted from liner notes from Chromatica.

Locations

- Recorded at Henson Recording Studios in Los Angeles, California
- Mixed at Sterling Sound Studios in New York City, New York

Personnel

- Lady Gaga – vocals, songwriter
- Blackpink – vocals
- Burns – producer, songwriter, bass, drums, keyboards, percussion
- BloodPop – producer, songwriter, bass, drums, keyboards, percussion
- Madison Love – songwriter, backing vocals
- Teddy Park – songwriter
- Rami Yacoub – songwriter
- Benjamin Rice – mixer, recording engineer
- Tom Norris – mixer
- E. Scott Kelly – assistant mixer
- Randy Merill – mastering engineer

== Charts ==
=== Weekly charts ===
Weekly chart performance
| Chart (2020) | Peak position |
|---|---|
| Australia (ARIA) | 8 |
| Austria (Ö3 Austria Top 40) | 42 |
| Canada Hot 100 (Billboard) | 18 |
| CIS Airplay (TopHit) | 106 |
| Czech Republic Singles Digital (ČNS IFPI) | 20 |
| Estonia (Eesti Tipp-40) | 8 |
| Finland (Suomen virallinen lista) | 15 |
| France (SNEP) | 62 |
| Greece International (IFPI) | 10 |
| Hungary (Single Top 40) | 4 |
| Hungary (Stream Top 40) | 8 |
| Ireland (IRMA) | 11 |
| Italy (FIMI) | 46 |
| Japan (Japan Hot 100) | 43 |
| Lithuania (AGATA) | 5 |
| Malaysia (RIM) | 1 |
| Netherlands (Single Top 100) | 52 |
| Netherlands (Global Top 40) | 4 |
| New Zealand (Recorded Music NZ) | 12 |
| Portugal (AFP) | 24 |
| Russia Airplay (TopHit) | 93 |
| Scottish Singles Sales (Official Charts) | 20 |
| Singapore (RIAS) | 1 |
| Slovakia Singles Digital (ČNS IFPI) | 20 |
| South Korea (Gaon) | 178 |
| Spain (Promusicae) | 46 |
| Sweden (Sverigetopplistan) | 49 |
| Switzerland (Schweizer Hitparade) | 30 |
| UK Singles (Official Charts) | 17 |
| US Billboard Hot 100 | 33 |
| US Hot Dance/Electronic Songs (Billboard) | 3 |

Shygirl and Mura Masa remix
| Chart (2021) | Peak position |
|---|---|
| US Hot Dance/Electronic Songs (Billboard) | 24 |

=== Monthly charts ===
Monthly chart performance
| Chart (2020) | Peak position |
|---|---|
| Brazil Streaming (Pro-Música Brasil) | 43 |

=== Year-end charts ===
Year-end chart performance
| Chart (2020) | Position |
|---|---|
| US Hot Dance/Electronic Songs (Billboard) | 16 |

== Certifications ==
Certifications
| Region | Certification | Certified units/sales |
|---|---|---|
| Australia (ARIA) | Gold | 35,000^{‡} |
| Brazil (Pro-Música Brasil) | Diamond | 160,000^{‡} |
| Canada (Music Canada) | Gold | 40,000^{‡} |
| New Zealand (RMNZ) | Gold | 15,000^{‡} |
| Poland (ZPAV) | Gold | 25,000^{‡} |
| United Kingdom (BPI) | Silver | 200,000^{‡} |
| United States (RIAA) | Gold | 500,000^{‡} |
^{‡} Sales+streaming figures based on certification alone.

== Release history ==
Release dates and formats
| Region | Date | Format(s) | Label | Ref. |
|---|---|---|---|---|
| Various | May 28, 2020 | Digital download; streaming | Interscope | |

== See also ==
- List of best-selling girl group singles
- List of K-pop songs on the Billboard charts
- List of number-one songs of 2020 (Malaysia)
- List of number-one songs of 2020 (Singapore)
