= Liss (band) =

Danish band

- Genres: Alternative pop; Indie pop; Electronica; R&B
- Years active: 2015–2022
- Labels: Escho; XL Recordings
- Past members: Søren Holm Nielesn; Villads Tyrrestrup Øster; Vilhelm Tiburtz Strange; Tobias Laust Hansen

Liss was a Danish pop band. Formed in 2014 in Aarhus, the group consisted of Søren Holm (lead vocals), Vilhelm Strange (guitar), Villads Tyrrestrup (bass and backing vocals), and Tobias Laust (drums). The band released its debut song, "Try", in early 2015, and received attention in the international indie music industry, signing with Danish indie label Escho and British XL Recordings that year. They released their debut EP, First, in May 2016, followed by EPs Second in 2019 and Third in 2020. The band was plagued by Søren Holm's issues with mental illness, and he died by suicide on 25 May 2021. Their debut album, I Guess Nothing Will Be The Same, recorded in 2020, was released in June 2022. In 2025, Danish newspaper Politiken ranked "Try" as the 91st-best Danish pop song of all time.

== History ==
=== 2014–2016: Formation and early work ===
The band, unnamed at first, formed in 2014. Lead singer Søren Holm and guitarist Vilhelm Strange were high-school classmates, while bassist Villads Tyrrestrup and drummer Tobias Laust went to efterskole together. Strange met Laust at a party, where they agreed to play together, and the four first met in September 2014 in Tyrrestrup and Laust's rehearsal room in western Aarhus. With little production experience, they recorded several demos. Laust showed one of them, "Try", to record producer William Asingh, also known as Vera, his girlfriend's brother; he was enthusiastic about the song and agreed to produce and mix it properly. "Try" was uploaded to SoundCloud in early 2015. The platform required a username to upload it, and so they named themselves Liss, a Danish girl's name. Asingh sent the song to Nis Bysted, founder of the Copenhagen-based indie label Escho, who also forwarded it to Imran Ahmed, head of A&R at the British indie label XL Recordings. The band played for Bysted and Ahmed in their rehearsal room in February 2015, and they signed to Escho, with Bysted as their manager; soon after they also played their first gig as opener for the XL Recordings–signed band Jungle in Aarhus. They played at Roskilde Festival, Denmark's largest festival, in June 2015.

For a Danish band with only one independently released song in their discography, Liss received an unusually large amount of interest from the international music industry in their first full year as a band, with dozens of music executives flying into Denmark to hear them. "Try" was released again via Escho in August 2015, followed by "Always" in October, a demo of which had been played in Pharrell Williams's radio program Othertone. The band signed with XL Recordings in November 2015. In 2025, "Try" was ranked 91st in Politiken's list of the 100 best Danish pop songs of all time.

Liss released "Sorry" in March 2016 as the lead single from their debut EP, First, which was released that May, distributed internationally by XL Recordings and domestically by Escho. The EP was met with positive reviews, with Danish critics complimenting the band's funk-tinged pop sound and Holm's soulful vocals. In support of the EP, Liss played gigs in the UK in May and in the US in June. They moved to Copenhagen in mid-2016. In October 2016, they were nominated at P3 Guld for the main prize, P3 Prisen, and performed "Sorry" at the ceremony. At the Danish Music Awards the following month, Liss was nominated in the category "Danish group of the year", while the First EP was nominated in the categories "Danish Release of the Year" and "Danish Urban Release of the Year". (Note: Danish: Årets Danske Gruppe, Årets Danske Udgivelse, and Årets Danske Urbanudgivelse.) However, Søren Holm suffered from anxiety and depression, and in November 2016 he was admitted to a psychiatric ward after a series of panic attacks; he was discharged in December. The band did not release new music in the following two-and-a-half years, only sporadically performing live.

=== 2019–2023: Comeback, Holm's death, and I Guess Nothing Will Be The Same ===
Making a comeback in April 2019, Liss released the single "Talk To Me", followed by "Reputation" the month after. The two singles were included on the six-track EP Second, released in June 2019. The sound was described as synth-driven alternative pop, with songs featuring bouncy synthesizers, punchy drums, dreamy guitar arrangements, and lo-fi and atmospheric textures. This was followed by the five-track EP Third in July 2020. During the COVID-19 pandemic, Liss moved to Holm's father's old farm to work on their debut album. Recording was finished in late 2020. They released a series of non-album singles: "Leave Me on the Floor" in October 2020, "Only Kisses" together with producer Vera in March 2021, and the double single "Precious / Leave Me on the Floor" in early May 2021.

Production of the album was finished in April 2021. However, on 25 May 2021, Holm died by suicide at the age of 25. The band ceased to make new music after his death. With encouragement from Holm's parents, the three remaining members released their debut album, I Guess Nothing Will Be The Same, in June 2022 via Escho. The record was described as pop with electronic textures, synthesizers, guitar interplay, and soulful vocal delivery, coupled with often melancholic lyrics. It was warmly received. Rolling Stone UK wrote: "The album showcases the group's deft pop hooks and the interplay between Holm’s unique voice and his bandmates' dreamy instrumentation, while Nilüfer Yanya appears on album standout 'Boys in Movies'. It’s a beautiful if bittersweet tribute to Holm." Soundvenue placed it at number 13 on their list of the 20 best Danish albums of 2022.

A five-part podcast about the band and Holm's death, titled Liss - Tonerne af en afsked (Liss – The Sound of a Farewell), was released by Danish national broadcaster DR a few weeks after the album, consisting of interviews with Strange, Laust, and Tyrrestrup. In November 2023 they released "Receiver", which had been used as a jingle in the podcast.

== Discography ==
Albums

- I Guess Nothing Will Be the Same (2022)

EPs

- First (2016)
- Second (2019)
- Third (2020)

Singles

- "Try / Always" (2015)
- "Sorry" (2016)
- "Talk to Me" (2019)
- "Reputation" (2019)
- "Waste My Time / Off Today" (2020)
- "Another Window" (2020)
- "Only Kisses" (with Vera; 2021)
- "Precious / Leave Me on the Floor" (2021)
- "Country Fuckboy / Exist" (2022)
- "Boys In Movies" (2022)
- "Receiver" (2023)

== Notes ==
Comments

Citations
