= They Hate Change =

American hip hop duo

- Origin: Tampa, Florida, U.S.
- Genres: Hip hop; Electronic music
- Years active: 2015–present
- Label: Jagjaguwar
- Members: Andre "Dre" Gainey; Vonne Parks

They Hate Change is an American hip hop and electronic music duo from Tampa, Florida, consisting of members Vonne Parks and Andre "Dre" Gainey. The duo is known for its diverse array of influences, including hip hop, drum 'n' bass, Chicago footwork, post-punk, prog, grime, krautrock and emo. The Tampa Bay Times has described They Hate Change as "musical ambassadors for the Gulf Coast".

== History ==
The members of They Hate Change met as adolescents, when Gainey moved to Tampa from Rochester, New York at the age of twelve. At that time, he moved into the same apartment building as Parks, who at the time was already becoming involved in the local music scene. Gainey took an interest in the local musical styles of Tampa, and began collaborating with Parks to produce beats. Initially, the duo planned for Parks alone to rap over the duo's beats, but both members now rap as well as produce instrumental music. Gainey and Parks also collaboratively DJed at house parties in their teenage years; by incorporating a diverse selection of genres into their DJ sets, the duo began establishing the combination of influences that would go on to define They Hate Change.

The first project released under the They Hate Change name was a 2015 EP titled Cycles. The duo continued releasing music prolifically throughout the later 2010s. In 2019, They Hate Change undertook a tour throughout the state of Florida, their first time performing outside of the immediate Tampa area; a larger follow-up tour was planned, but the COVID-19 pandemic forced its cancellation. In 2020, They Hate Change was approached by the record label Godmode, which sought to release an EP from the group. The resulting project, 666 Central Ave, attracted the attention of another label, Jagjaguwar. After a period of negotiations, Jagjaguwar formally signed They Hate Change in 2021. On May 13, 2022, They Hate Change released Finally, New, their first album on Jagjaguwar and eighth project overall. Gainey has described Finally, New as displaying "the purest form" of the duo's musical style. The album was also acclaimed by DJ Mag, which labeled the duo as "a unique creative force in both rap and dance music".

After the release of Finally, New, They Hate Change began a more intensive touring schedule for the remainder of 2022, touring throughout North America and Europe.

== Style and influences ==
They Hate Change is strongly influenced by genres from British music, such as jungle and happy hardcore; its members describe themselves as Anglophiles. The duo's music is also seen as incorporating the "myriad electronic subgenres" of Florida, such as Miami bass and a Tampa-based hip hop subgenre known as jook. Jordan Darville of The Fader summarizes the group's music as "blur[ring] genre lines with playfulness and style".

They Hate Change makes extensive use of Akai samplers in their music, in order to mirror the preferred equipment of 1990s jungle and drum'n'bass artists. Parks has described the group's workflow as follows:

I go more wild with things. And Dre is able to see exactly where [the track is] supposed to go. So it's very maximal at the beginning of the process; a kitchen sink kind of approach. And then we start dialing it back and making it into something real.

Individual artists that They Hate Change have identified as influences include Goldie, Brian Eno, D Double E, and Dizzee Rascal. Gainey has named Camp Lo, Rick Ross, Curren$y, Pusha T, and Jay-Z as artists who have influenced his lyrics; Vonne describes their lyrics as inspired by Clipse and Newham Generals. The duo has been noted for their eclectic lyrical content, which has been characterized as "bookish rhymes covering everything from personal insecurities and punk icon Poly Styrene to their beloved dogs".

== Discography ==
=== Studio albums ===
- Cycles (2015)
- Now, And Never Again (2018)
- Finally, New (2022)

=== EPs ===
- Meters (2017)
- Clearwater (2019)
- Juices Run Clear (2019)
- Maneuvers (2020)
- 666 Central Ave (2020)
- Wish You Were Here... (2024)

=== Mixtapes ===
- Today. (2013)
