= Can't Let Go (Linda Király song) =

Single by Linda Király
- Released: July 3, 2007 (US); August 29, 2007 (Hungary)
- Recorded: 2007
- Genre: R&B, Soul
- Length: 3:44 (Album Version); 4:03 (Radio Edit with Guitars)
- Label: Universal
- Songwriters: Rodney "Darkchild" Jerkins, LaShawn Daniels, Delisha Thomas, Anesha Birchett, Antea Birchett
- Producer: Rodney Jerkins

Linda Király singles chronology
"Olimpiai dal 2004" (2004)	"Can't Let Go" (2007)	"Love Is Overrated" (2011)

"Can't Let Go" is a song by Linda Király. It was planned to be the lead single of her debut English-language album Linda Kiraly, which never materialized. The song was produced by Rodney Jerkins.

== Music video ==
The beginning of the music video shows Linda Kiraly in a white dress behind is a white wall. Then in the other shots she wears a black dress.

== Reception ==
Chuck Taylor from billboard gave it a positive review saying. "The beatbox-buxom "Can't Let Go," about a toxic relationship, conjures Natasha Bedingfield with its pure soul/pop template and a hook big enough to catch a mountain bass."
