= Karma Kid =

British record producer (born 1994/95)

- Born: 1994 or 1995 (age 31–32)
- Genres: Electronic dance, house
- Occupations: Record producer, DJ
- Years active: 2012–present
- Labels: Greco-Roman, Future Classic, Roche Musique, Black Butter Records
- Website: instagram.com/karmakiduk/

Sam Knowles, known professionally as Karma Kid, is a British record producer and DJ. Since 2012 he has been releasing music under his own alias and as the electronic duo Shy Luv. Karma Kid also produces other artists' works.

== Solo discography ==
Year	Song	Label
2012	"Entity Relationship Diagram"	Just Us
2012	"Delight in Delaware"	Just Us
2012	"Try As You May" (featuring Module Module)	L2S Recordings
2012	"Do Me Wrong" (with Armeria)	Just Us
2012	"Take Mine"	Self-released
2012	"LouLou"	Just Us
2012	"Lust, Love"	XLR8R
2012	"It's Always"	Just Us
2013	"In My Arms"	Just Us
2014	"Like I'm on Fire"	Roche Musique
2014	"Bird of Prey"	Future Classic
2016	"Shapes" with Ten Ven (featuring Demo Taped)	Greco-Roman
2016	"Man of The Year"	Greco-Roman
2016	"Thru The Tundra (featuring Aminé)	Greco-Roman
2017	"Allison / Candyland w/ Fono"	Method Records
2018	"Clap Your Hands / Telephone w/ Fono"	Self-released
2020	"Freedom"	Greco-Roman
2021	"Say U Luv Me"	Greco-Roman
2022	"BOSSA EP w/ Luke Fono"	Fool's Gold Records
2023	"Break Away From What You Know EP"	Method Records
