= Brooke Candy discography =

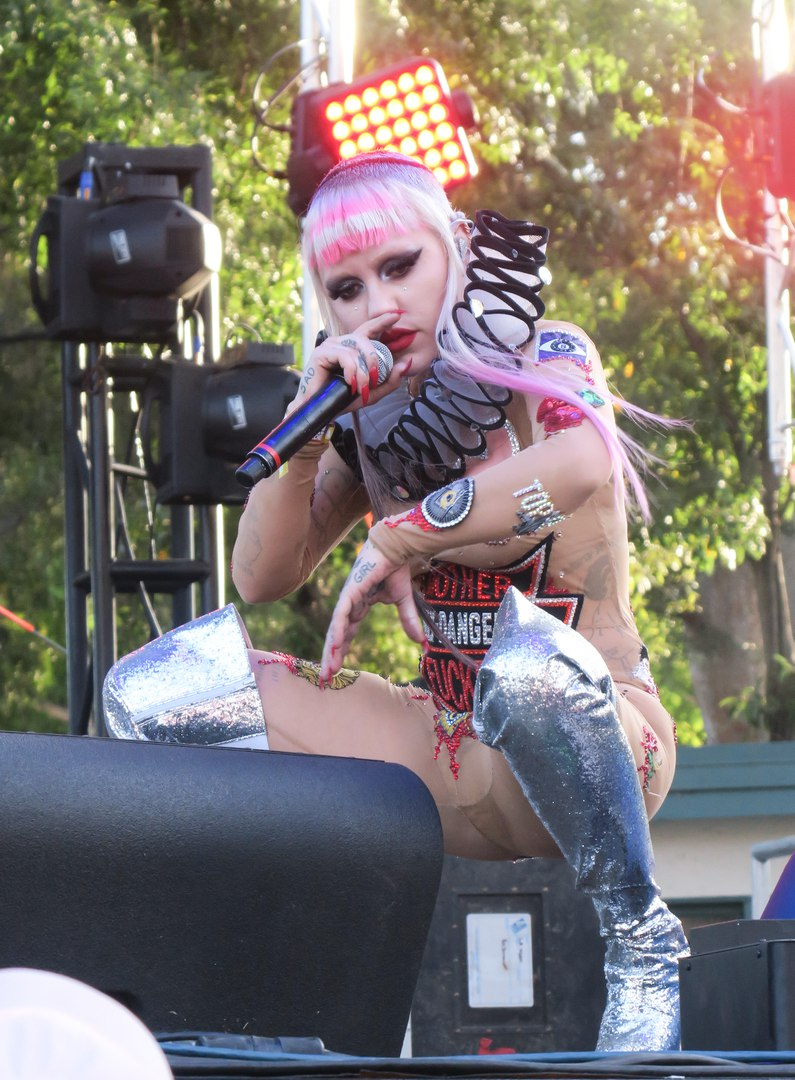
- Candy in 2017
- Studio albums: 3
- EPs: 1
- Singles: 33
- Mixtapes: 1
- DJ mixes: 1
- Guest appearances: 15
- Music videos: 32

American rapper, singer, and songwriter Brooke Candy has released three studio albums, one extended play, one mixtape, thirty-three singles, and thirty-two music videos.

== Studio albums ==
Title	Details
Sexorcism	Released: October 25, 2019; Label: NUXXE; Format: Digital download, streaming
Candyland	Release date: July 25, 2024; Label: Brooke Candy; Format: Digital download, streaming
Spiral	Released: October 25, 2024; Label: Brooke Candy; Format: Digital download, streaming

== Extended plays ==
Title	Details	Peaks	
Title	Details	US R&B/ HH	US Heat
Opulence	Released: May 6, 2014; Label: RCA; Format: CD, digital download	48	23

== Mixtapes ==
Title	Details
The Mixtape	Released: June 25, 2013; Label: Self-released; Format: Digital download

== Singles ==
=== As lead artist ===
List of singles, with selected chart positions
Title	Year	Peaks		Album
Title	Year	US Dance	CRO	Album
"Das Me"	2012	—	—	Non-album singles
"Everybody Does"	2013	—	—	Non-album singles
"I Wanna Fuck Right Now"	2013	—	—	Non-album singles
"Don't Touch My Hair Hoe"	2013	—	—	The Mixtape
"Pussy Make the Rules" (featuring Lakewet)	2013	—	—	Non-album single
"Dumb"	2013	—	—	The Mixtape
"Opulence"	2014	—	—	Opulence
"Rubber Band Stacks"	2015	—	—	Non-album singles
"Happy Days"	2016	—	—	Non-album singles
"Changes"	2016	—	—	Non-album singles
"Nasty"	2016	—	—	Non-album singles
"Paper or Plastic"	2016	—	—	Non-album singles
"Living Out Loud" (featuring Sia)	2017	4	47	Non-album singles
"Volcano"	2017	—	—	Non-album singles
"For Free"	2018	—	—	Non-album singles
"War"	2018	—	—	Non-album singles
"My Sex" (featuring Mykki Blanco, Pussy Riot and MNDR)	2018	—	—	Non-album singles
"Nuts" (featuring Lil Aaron)	2018	—	—	Non-album singles
"Oomph" (with Ojivolta)	2018	—	—	Non-album singles
"Happy"	2019	—	—	Non-album singles
"XXXTC" (featuring Charli XCX and Maliibu Miitch)	2019	—	—	Sexorcism
"Drip" (featuring Erika Jayne)	2019	—	—	Sexorcism
"FMU" (featuring Rico Nasty)	2019	—	—	Sexorcism
"Flip Phone"	2022	—	—	Non-album single
"Yoga" (with Only Fire)	2022	—	—	Candyland
"Juicy Fruit"	2023	—	—	Non-album singles
"FMUATW"	2023	—	—	Non-album singles
"Safe Word"	2024	—	—	Candyland
"Pills"	2024	—	—	Candyland
"Block"	2024	—	—	Candyland
"Next Bitch"	2024	—	—	Spiral
"Pogo"	2025	—	—	Non-album singles
"Swans" (with Coucou Chloe)	2025	—	—	Non-album singles
"VIP"	2026	—	—	TBA
"—" denotes a recording that did not chart or was not released in that territory

=== As featured artist ===
Title	Year	Album
"Theme Music" (Count Mack featuring Brooke Candy)	2012	Non-album single
"Big Racks" (Bree Runway featuring Brooke Candy)	2019	Be Runway
"Ay Papi" (Dawn Richard featuring Brooke Candy)	2019	Non-album single
"Demon Bitches" (Tommy Lee featuring Brooke Candy and Moon Bounce)	2020	Andro
"End of the Freak Show" (CocoRosie featuring ANOHNI, Brooke Candy, Big Freedia, and Cakes da Killa)	2020	Non-album singles
"Cunt-Mix" (Maleigh Zan featuring Infinite Coles, Aliyah's Interlude, and Brooke Candy)	2025	Non-album singles

== Guest appearances ==
Title	Year	Other artist(s)	Album
"Cloud Aura"	2012	Charli XCX	True Romance
"Take Me Away"	2015	Bleachers, Rachel Antonoff	Terrible Thrills, Vol. 2
"16 Dollars"	2016	Kaya Stewart	Kaya Stewart
"I Got It"	2017	Charli XCX, Cupcakke and Pabllo Vittar	Pop 2
"Wall"	2019	Jesse Saint John, Lil Aaron	Don't Stop Dancing. Life Gets Sad
"Shake It"	2019	Charli XCX, Cupcakke, Pabllo Vittar, and Big Freedia	Charli
"Sexy Nasty"	2019	La Goony Chonga	Dimen5ión

=== Remixes ===
Title	Year	Artist	Album
"Fashun" (Brooke Candy & Slush Puppy Remix)	2024	Brasko	Fashun
"KFC Santeria" (Peaches & Brooke Candy Remix)	2025	Cain Culto	Non-album single

== DJ mixes ==
Title	Details
Sexorcists	Released: September 11, 2019; Label: Crack; Format: Digital download

== Music videos ==
List of music videos, showing year released and directors
Title	Year	Director(s)	Ref.
"Das Me"	2012	Brooke Candy; Matthew Boman	
"Theme Music"	2012	Alex2Tone	
"Everybody Does"	2013	Renata Raksha	
"I Wanna Fuck Right Now"	2013	Spaghetto	
"Pussy Make the Rules"	2013	Filmmaker; Meredith Danluck	
"Dumb"	2013	Chris Murdoch	
"Opulence"	2014	Steven Klein	
"A Study in Duality"	2015	Brooke Candy; Lil Internet	
"Rubber Band Stacks"	2015	Ssion	
"Happy Days"	2016	Renata Raksha	
"Nasty"	2016	Rankin	
"Paper or Plastic"	2016	Darren Craig	
"Living Out Loud"	2017	Simon Cahn	
"Volcano"	2017	Brooke Candy	
"My Sex"	2018	Pastelae	
"Oomph"	2018	Brooke Candy	
"Happy"	2019	Rankin	
"XXXTC"	2019	Luke Abby; Dejan Jovanović	
"Drip"	2019	Brooke Candy; Angelo Kritikos	
"FMU"	2019	Brooke Candy	
"Freak Like Me"	2019	Rony Alwin; Brooke Candy	
"Nymph"	2019	Brooke Candy	
"Honey Pussy"	2020	Jordan Rossi	
"Cum"	2020	Dejan Jovanović	
"Flip Phone"	2022	Brooke Candy	
"Juicy Fruit"	2023	Jennifer Juniper Stratford	
"FMUATW"	2023	Brooke Candy	
"Safe Word"	2024	Kyle England	
"Pills"	2024	Kyle England	
"Block"	2024	Kyle England	
"Pogo"	2025	Brooke Candy; Nick Thompson; James Framez	
"Swans"	2025	Kyle England	
