= Safe Word (song) =

2024 song by Brooke Candy

Single by Brooke Candy

from the album Candyland
- Released: February 22, 2024
- Genre: Electropop; house; futurepop
- Length: 2:06
- Songwriters: Brooke Candy; JBach
- Producer: Jordan Palmer

Brooke Candy singles chronology
"FMUATW" (2023)	"Safe Word" (2024)	"Pills" (2024)

Music video
- "Safe Word" on YouTube

"Safe Word" is a song by American rapper Brooke Candy, released as a digital-only single on February 22, 2024. It was released as the lead single from her sophomore studio album Candyland (2024) and her twenty-eighth single overall.

== Background and release ==
In September 2022, Brooke Candy spoke to Paper about the release of her hyperpop-influenced single "Flip Phone", describing it as "an exploration of pop music and a new sound for [Candy]". It was her first new song since the release of her debut studio album, Sexorcism (2019), and initially promoted as the lead single of her upcoming sophomore album, which was described as "much more pop and digestible" than much of her previous dirty rap outputs. Candy also released the collaborative song "Yoga" with Croatian musician Only Fire on October 14, 2022. In January 2023, Candy promoted the release of a new single "Juicy Fruit" in an interview with Only Fire for Interview Magazine, expressing indecisiveness about whether or not to release her new singles as part of a full project and later dubbing them a "horny string of singles" upon the release of a fourth new single entitled "FMUATW".

On February 19, 2024, Candy announced the release of a new single "Safe Word", clarifying that it was the "official" lead single of her upcoming album, which was in its final stages of production at the time of the song's release. The track had previously been teased on Candy's Instagram story two months prior and was officially released on February 22, 2024. It was produced by American musician Jordan Palmer and written by American songwriter JBach along with Candy herself. It also featured a new electro-pop sound for Candy, emphasized as the "start of a new chapter for the artist" in her interview with V, which described the lyrics of the song as "thought-provoking and evocative". Candy described the meaning of the song as "giving in to your dark desires" and "living life on the edge to feel alive". She also cited Britney Spears with her album Blackout (2007) as an inspiration for the sound and overall vibe of the song, naming it the "dirtiest song on the album" and detailing her journey to tone down her artistic persona for the new era.

Candy referred to the release of "Safe Word" as a "triumphant return", detailing her past dissatisfaction with her place in the music industry and feeling "very overlooked" throughout the previous two years in an interview with Office. She reiterated this in her interview with Hypebae, referring to an "insane, almost vengeful demonic drive to go harder than [she has] ever gone" with the release of her sophomore album.

== Music video ==
The official music video for "Safe Word" was released on February 22, 2024, directed by Candy's husband Kyle England. Candy also dyed her hair orange to represent the new era, citing Madonna as an inspiration for both the stylistic change and the video itself. Candy also references the 1995 Hong Kong film Fallen Angels throughout the car scene of the music video, in which Candy reclines in the backseat of a convertible and rides down a busy highway, though this has also been likened to the visuals of The Doom Generation. The cinematography of the video was also inspired by that of Fallen Angels in an attempt to make the visuals "feel like an acid trip".

== Credits ==
- Vocals – Brooke Candy
- Songwriting – Brooke Candy, JBach
- Production – Jordan Palmer

== Release history ==
Release history and formats for "Safe Word"
Region	Format	Date
Various	Digital download; streaming	February 22, 2024
