= River Moon =

South African-born electronic musician

- Also known as: Saint Deepthroat; River Jason Moon
- Born: 12 August 1998 (age 27); Cape Town, South Africa
- Origin: New York City, U.S.
- Genres: Techno; house; R&B; punk; ambient; pop
- Occupations: Record producer; DJ; internet personality
- Years active: 2019–present
- Member of: Patia's Fantasy World

River Moon (born 12 August 1998) is a South African-born record producer, DJ, songwriter and internet personality. They (Note: River Moon uses they/them pronouns.) rose to prominence as a co-owner of the Instagram meme account @patiasfantasyworld and performed as an opening act during Beyoncé's Renaissance World Tour in 2023. River Moon is often associated with the queer underground club scene in New York City, with Paper referring to them as an "NYC it-girl".

In addition to releases as a solo artist, including collaborations with LSDXOXO and Umru, River Moon has production and songwriting credits for artists such as PinkPantheress, Kelela, Peaches, Shygirl, Rochelle Jordan, and VTSS. They also starred in and contributed to the soundtrack of the upcoming film Club Kid (2026), which premiered at the 2026 Cannes Film Festival.

== Early life ==
River Moon was born on 12 August 1998 in Cape Town, South Africa, and moved to New York City around the age of four, before returning to Cape Town again around the age of 19. They worked as a mortician's apprentice during the COVID-19 pandemic and has said that they have failed their embalming license test three times.

== Career ==
River Moon and Laina Berry joined Patia Borja as a moderator of the famed Instagram meme account @patiasfantasyworld in 2019, when it had around 5000 followers. The account posted content largely relating to Black cultural life and experiences, experiencing significant growth during the 2020 Black Lives Matter protests. By June 2022, the account had amassed over 540 thousand followers. River Moon's involvement with the account significantly expanded the audience for their music. In July 2020, they released their debut mixtape, Martyr, which was noted for its "ambient instrumentals and obscure production". Following the death of Scottish electronic musician Sophie in 2021, British music magazine Stamp the Wax published a DJ mix that River Moon had created as a tribute to the artist. River Moon relocated from Cape Town to Los Angeles in 2022, and then to Berlin in 2023.

As an opening act for American singer Beyoncé's Renaissance World Tour in September 2023, River Moon performed a back-to-back DJ set with Goth Jafar at the NRG Stadium in Houston. They performed their first live show in that same year, as a supporting act for French electronic musician Coucou Chloe in Berlin. They also performed at the renowned nightclub Berghain as part of the venue's first-ever lineup composed exclusively of Black artists. River Moon was included on Mixmag's list of the 'Top 25 Breakthrough DJs Of The Year' for 2023. They were announced as a performer for Sónar festival in Barcelona in 2024. River Moon also performed at Planned Parenthood's annual fundraising gala in New York City in April 2024.

River Moon said they have an acting role as well as soundtrack contributions in the upcoming comedy-drama film Club Kid (2026), which premiered at the Un Certain Regard section of the 2026 Cannes Film Festival.

== Personal life ==
River Moon uses they/them pronouns. They underwent an emergency hip replacement in 2020, followed by a second hip replacement in 2023 during a period of sepsis. This procedure took place six weeks before their performance at Beyoncé's Renaissance World Tour, during which time they were reportedly still undergoing gait training.

== Discography ==
=== Mixtapes ===
Title	Album details
Martyr	Released: 3 July 2020; Label: Self-released; Formats: Digital download, streaming

=== Extended plays ===
Title	EP details
Club Edits Vol. 1 (as Saint Deepthroat)	Released: 13 January 2019; Label: Self-released; Formats: Digital download

=== Singles ===
==== As lead artist ====
Title	Year	Album
"The Rave Princess"	2021	Non-album singles
"HARD"	2021	Non-album singles
"Digital Thot"	2021	Non-album singles
"Psychosomatic"	2021	Non-album singles
"SHAKE DAT"	2022	Non-album singles
"HARD 2.0" (with Only Fire)	2023	Non-album singles
"MOLLY" (with Umru)	2023	Non-album singles
"10 Bad Bitches" (with Chase Icon and That Kid featuring Petal Supply, Warpstr, Umru and Iglooghost)	2023	Non-album singles
"CHUDAI"	2024	Non-album singles

==== As featured artist ====
Title	Year	Album
"Lets Go Zante" (Babymorocco featuring River Moon)	2022	Non-album single
"HOT" (Manni Dee featuring River Moon)	2023	Non-album single

=== Other appearances ===
Title	Year	Other artist(s)	Album
"Venus in Cancer"	2020	—N/a	Select Y20Q1
"Sick Bitch (River Moon Remix)"	2022	Lsdxoxo	Dedicated 2 Disrespect: The Remixes
"Waterrrrrrrrr (River Moon Remix)"	2022	Saturn Risin9	Venus Virgo: Expansion Pack
"Mosquito (River Moon Remix)"	2023	PinkPantheress	Heaven Knows (Remixes)
"Ouais (River Moon Remix)"	2023	Bok Bok	Night Slugs Classix Remixed
"On The Run (River Moon Remix)	2023	Kelela, ThugPop	RAVE:N, The Remixes
"Blackout"	2024	Brooke Candy, Chi	Spiral
"Classy"	2025	Lsdxoxo	DGTL ANML
"Hanging Titties (River Moon Remix)"	2026	Peaches	TBA

=== Songwriting and production credits ===
Year	Title	Artist	Album	Writer or co-writer	Producer or co-producer
2019	"Crying"	Jesse Saint John	Don't Stop Dancing. Life Gets Sad.	check	
2024	"Girls Girls Girls"	Lsdxoxo	Dogma	check	
2025	"Wifey Riddim (Club Shy VIP)"	Shygirl, Jorja Smith	Non-album single		check
2025	"Immaculate (Club Shy VIP)"	Shygirl, Saweetie	Non-album single		check
2025	"Ladida"	Rochelle Jordan	Through the Wall	check	

== Filmography ==
=== Film ===
Year	Title	Role
2026	Club Kid	
