= Spiral (Brooke Candy album) =

Studio album by Brooke Candy
- Released: October 25, 2024
- Genres: Hip house; electro house; experimental pop; electroclash
- Length: 27:40
- Producers: Cole M.G.N.; Liam Benayon; Slush Puppy; Jon Santana; Cecile Believe; Jordan Palmer; Leo Jupiter; 444BOY; Mads Mason; Jahs

Brooke Candy chronology
| Candyland (2024) | Spiral (2024) |

Singles from Spiral
- 1. "Next Bitch" Released: September 6, 2024

Spiral (stylized in all caps) is the third studio album by American rapper Brooke Candy, released on October 25, 2024. It serves as a companion piece to her sophomore studio album Candyland (2024), consisting largely of songs originating from recording sessions of the album.

Spiral has been described as Brooke Candy's last fully pop album, incorporating themes inspired by Candy's mental health and leaning into a noisier sound than showcased in her previous outputs.

== Background ==
Amidst a nearly three-year long hiatus from releasing music, Candy revealed in a November 2021 interview with Inked that she had been invited back into the studio by producers and old collaborators and was preparing a follow-up to her debut album, Sexorcism (2019). After the release of four songs dubbed "a string of horny singles" throughout 2022 and 2023, Candy released her second studio album, Candyland, on July 25, 2024, and embarked on an accompanying tour throughout North America in promotion of the album.

Upon the release of the third single from the album "Block", Candy revealed that she was planning on releasing Candyland as a double album, with the second volume releasing later in the year. On August 15, 2024, she clarified that the aforementioned second half would instead be released as her third studio album, Spiral, initially slated for release on October 4, 2024.

== Recording and promotion ==
In an interview with Paper, Candy expressed disappointment in the current state of pop music, stating that she had trouble relating to the "toned down and perfect" facade of modern pop stars: "All my favorite artists growing up had serious issues, and I feel like I loved them because I could relate to them. I thought, Wow, those people really are like me. I want to see a celebrity with mental health issues that is truly spiraling out of control, because that's how I feel every single day of my life, right? I want to know the truth. I feel nobody is really honest, which is so funny, because everyone is on TikTok all day, every day, but I still feel like people are so contained." She stated that she was taking inspiration from Britney Spears and Slayyyter for the album and continuing to build onto the pop sound showcased in Candyland, previously having stated that she had always felt like a "pop girly deep down" and wanting to "see if [she] could be proud of the end result".

"I have never felt like I've been taken seriously as a musician, and I also haven't taken it as seriously because of that. I think I just believed opinions of me and was very hard on myself. I feel like oftentimes I create from that space of feeling like I'm not good at anything, and so I want to see if I can be better. I want to prove to myself. And then also, I think a lot of my drive to create comes from vengeance and revenge, you know? I want to prove people wrong. I've had this voice in my head that has been there my entire life, but since I've started to make art, it's gotten a lot louder. I've felt like maybe I'm not a musician, I'm more of a performance artist. Or more of just, I don't know, a wacky person. So I wanted to make something to prove that I should be taken seriously, or that I had worth."

— Brooke Candy on Spiral

In September 2024, Candy posted a series of tweets on X (formerly known as Twitter) detailing her frustrations with her role in the music industry and how it had impacted her health and relationships, citing marital issues, financial issues, fractured relationships, and suicidal thoughts, as well as struggles with impostor syndrome. She also shared her desire to create music that was "more experimental and alternative" and announced that Spiral would be her final pop album, cryptically posting "No more pop" and naming Lil Peep and Lords of Acid as inspirations for her future musical direction. Many of these struggles inspired the thematic elements of Spiral, with The Washington Post highlighting "a newfound glimmer of vulnerability" in both Candyland and Spiral. "I've only scratched the surface of what I'm going to show the world of my actual brain and my actual heart and what I have to give, which is much more than just sex", Candy said of Spiral and her future musical endeavors. "I took back 100 percent of my power when it came to the music".

The release date of Spiral was later pushed back to October 25, 2024, to coincide with the end of her North American tour in promotion of Candyland, where the album was released as Candy performed her final tour date at Zebulon in Los Angeles. Despite her lack of interest in continuing to release pop music in the following years, Candy remained "extremely proud" of the album, stating "I put everything I have into Spiral and I've never been so proud of anything in my life" in an Instagram post accompanying the album's release.

=== Singles ===
The lead and sole single off of Spiral "Next Bitch" was released on September 6, 2024.

A planned second single entitled "Pogo" was reportedly meant to appear on the album, although it was absent from the final tracklist upon the album's release. It was later released on February 7, 2025, as the lead single for her upcoming second EP.

=== Tour ===
Following her North American tour in support of Candyland, Brooke Candy embarked on the Spiral Tour throughout Europe, beginning on February 17, 2025, and ending on March 4, 2025. She was supported by Tash Blake as her opening act. Her first date in London featured guest appearances from Deto Black and Tayce. Candy failed to appear at her tenth stop in Lisbon, citing progressively worsening illness and a lack of rest via Instagram. Although the final dates in Dublin and Leeds were also cancelled due to severe illness and voice loss, Candy managed to perform her preceding show in Paris on March 1, 2025, as the official tenth and final date of the tour.

Spiral Tour
- Tour by Brooke Candy
- Associated album: Spiral
- Start date: February 17, 2025
- End date: March 4, 2025
- Legs: 1
- No. of shows: 10^{[a]}
- Supporting act: Tash Blake

Brooke Candy concert chronology
- The Candyland Tour; The Spiral Tour

List of concerts, showing date, city, country, venue, and opening act
| Date | City | Country | Venue | Opening act |
|---|---|---|---|---|
| February 17, 2025 | London | United Kingdom | Dingwalls | Tash Blake |
| February 18, 2025 | Berlin | Germany | Hole44 | Tash Blake |
| February 19, 2025 | Cologne | Germany | Club Volta | Tash Blake |
| February 21, 2025 | Milan | Italy | Rocket Club Milano | Tash Blake |
| February 22, 2025 | Manchester | United Kingdom | Cruz 101 | Tash Blake |
| February 23, 2025 | Vienna | Austria | B72 | Tash Blake |
| February 24, 2025 | Brussels | Belgium | Le Botanique | Tash Blake |
| February 26, 2025 | Copenhagen | Denmark | Rust | Tash Blake |
| February 27, 2025 | Frankfurt | Germany | Künstlerhaus Mousonturm | Tash Blake |
| March 1, 2025 | Paris | France | Badaboum | Tash Blake |

==== Cancelled shows ====
List of cancelled concerts, showing date, city, country, venue and reason
| Date | City | Country | Venue | Reason |
|---|---|---|---|---|
| February 28, 2025 | Lisbon | Portugal | Music Box | Illness |
| March 3, 2025 | Dublin | Ireland | The Grand Social | Pneumonia and voice loss |
| March 4, 2025 | Leeds | United Kingdom | Belgrave Music Hall | Pneumonia and voice loss |

Notes

- ^{^[a]} Initially thirteen; three were cancelled.

== Track listing ==
Spiral
| No. | Title | Writer(s) | Producer(s) | Length |
|---|---|---|---|---|
| 1. | "Angel Tattoo" | Brooke Candy; Cole Marsden Greif-Neill; Caila Thompson-Hannant | Cole M.G.N.; Cecile Believe | 2:12 |
| 2. | "Wreck Me" | Candy; Samuel Catelano; Liam Benayon | Slush Puppy; Liam Benayon | 2:17 |
| 3. | "Spiral" | Candy; Catelano; Benayon | Liam Benayon | 2:27 |
| 4. | "Naked" (featuring BbyAfricka) | Candy; Greif-Neill; Jesse St. John Geller; Jasmine Armani | Cole M.G.N. | 2:52 |
| 5. | "Hysteria" (featuring Alma) | Candy; Alma-Sofia Miettinen | Leo Jupiter | 2:16 |
| 6. | "Blackout" (featuring River Moon and Chi) | Candy; Catelano; Sean Ellmore; River Moon; Chi Virgo; Edwin Loftjet | Slush Puppy; 444BOY | 2:09 |
| 7. | "Glamorous" (featuring Isabella Lovestory and Urias) | Candy; Catherine Grace Garner; Jordan Palmer; Isabella Rodriguez; Lorena Urias Martins da Silva | Jordan Palmer | 2:51 |
| 8. | "Next Bitch" | Candy; Benayon; Jon Santana | Jon Santana | 2:04 |
| 9. | "Gag" | Candy; Geller; Greif-Neill | Cole M.G.N. | 2:36 |
| 10. | "Rumor" | Candy; GiGi Grombacher; Jason Hahs; Mads Mason; Phil Bentley | Jahs; Mads Mason | 2:03 |
| 11. | "Fix It" | Candy; Benayon; Santana | Jon Santana | 1:59 |
| 12. | "Sensual (I Want a Love)" | Candy; Catelano; Benayon | Slush Puppy; Liam Benayon | 2:00 |
| Total length: | | | | 27:40 |
