= Paper or Plastic =

Paper or Plastic may refer to:

- an expression referring to shopping bags
- "Paper or Plastic" (CSI: Crime Scene Investigation), a 2004 episode
- "Paper or Plastic" (song), 2016 song by Brooke Candy
