= Lsdxoxo discography =

Discography of American rapper

LSDXOXO discography
- EPs: 4
- Singles: 32
- Mixtapes: 13

American record producer, rapper, and songwriter Lsdxoxo has released one album, four extended plays, thirteen mixtapes, and two compilation albums.

== Albums ==
Title	Album details
DOGMA	Release: September 13, 2024; Label: Fantasy Audio Group; Format: Digital download, LP

== Extended plays ==
Title	EP details
Softcore	Release: November 23, 2013; Label: Self-released; Format: Digital download
Whorecore	Release: July 4, 2014; Label: Self-released; Format: Digital download
Dedicated 2 Disrespect	Release: May 14, 2021; Label: XL Recordings; Format: Digital download, LP
Dedicated 2 Disrespect: The Remixes	Release: March 25, 2022; Label: Floorgasm; Format: Digital download
Delusions of Grandeur (D.O.G.)	Release: September 22, 2023; Label: Fantasy Audio Group; Format: Digital download, LP

== Mixtapes ==
Title	Details
Spit or Swallow	Released: November 6, 2010; Label: Self-released; Format: Digital download
Spit or Swallow 2	Released: January 31, 2011; Label: Self-released; Format: Digital download
Spit or Swallow III	Released: April 6, 2011; Label: Self-released; Format: Digital download
Spit or Swallow IV	Released: November 21, 2011; Label: Self-released; Format: Digital download
Spit or Swallow V	Released: February 28, 2012; Label: Self-released; Format: Digital download
Spit or Swallow VI	Released: May 17, 2012; Label: Self-released; Format: Digital download
Spit or Swallow 7	Released: July 26, 2012; Label: Self-released; Format: Digital download
Muah	Released: January 1, 2013; Label: Self-released; Format: Digital download
Sacanagem	Released: March 26, 2015; Label: Self-released; Format: Digital download
Fuck Marry Kill	Released: June 2, 2016; Label: Self-released; Format: Digital download
Club Rub	Released: January 14, 2017; Label: Self-released; Format: Digital download
Body Mods	Released: January 11, 2018; Label: Self-released; Format: Digital download
Waiting 2 Exhale	Released: October 28, 2020; Label: Self-released; Format: Digital download
DGTL ANML	Release: June 13, 2025; Label: Fantasy Audio Group; Format: Digital download

== Compilations ==
Title	Details
Vault	Released: April 28, 2016; Label: Self-released; Format: Digital download
LSDXOXO's Deepest Cuts	Released: 2020; Label: Self-released; Format: Digital download

== Singles ==
Title	Year	Album
"XXXO" (Remix)	2010	Spit or Swallow
"Only Spellz"	2010	Spit or Swallow
"Sunshine Gypsies"	2010	Non-album singles
"SLWHNDS"	2012	Non-album singles
"LVSVNG"	2012	MUAH
"Long Way 2 Go"	2013	Non-album singles
"Chyna"	2013	Non-album singles
"Let's Jack"	2013	Non-album singles
"All Dat"	2013	Non-album singles
"Vxxdxxpvssy"	2014	Non-album singles
"Dazed in the East"	2014	Non-album singles
"[2222222 On]"	2015	Sacanagem
"S u f r i r"	2015	Non-album singles
"Up Inna Club (Bey)"	2015	Non-album singles
"FKA x Naan Ho"	2015	Non-album singles
"Creepy Clown Sighting (A Warning)"	2016	Non-album singles
"Aquecimento Do Evanescence"	2016	Non-album singles
"That Girl Is a Real Cryptkeeper"	2017	Club Rub
"I Still Loathe You"	2017	Non-album singles
"Inertia"	2018	Non-album singles
"Rockstar69"	2019	Non-album singles
"Women Eat Their Men"	2019	Non-album singles
"Dying for It"	2021	Non-album singles
"Sick Bitch"	2021	Dedicated 2 Disrespect
"The Devil"	2021	Dedicated 2 Disrespect
"uwu"	2021	Non-album single
"SMD"	2022	Dedicated 2 Disrespect: The Remixes
"Sick Bitch" (VTSS Remix)	2022	Dedicated 2 Disrespect: The Remixes
"DRaiN"	2022	Non-album singles
"Demons" (with Eartheater)	2022	Non-album singles
"Future Rhythm"	2022	Non-album singles
"Freak"	2022	Non-album singles
"Double Tap"	2023	Delusions of Grandeur (D.O.G.)
"Devil's Chariot"	2023	Delusions of Grandeur (D.O.G.)
"J'Adore"	2023	Delusions of Grandeur (D.O.G.)
"BLOODLUST"	2024	DOGMA
"4LUVN"	2024	DOGMA
"GHOST"	2024	DOGMA
"BRAND NEW"	2024	DOGMA
"RED"	2025	DGTL ANML
"QT"	2025	DGTL ANML
"SATISFY"	2025	DGTL ANML

== DJ mixes ==
Title	Year
"Spit or Swallow III (Dumpster Babies Mix)"	2011
"V1rtualt3ars"	2013
"Descensum"	2015
"LSDXOXO Mix for 100% Net Gallery"	2015
"NTS Radio Show 2/2/16"	2016

== Other charted songs ==
Title	Year	Peak chart positions	Album
Title	Year	US Dance	Album
"Alice" (LSDXOXO Remix)	2021	26	Dawn of Chromatica

== Other appearances ==
List of guest appearances, with other performing artists, showing year released and album name
Title	Year	Original artist(s)	Album	Notes
"Liu Kong"	2014	DonChristian	Renzo Piano	Producer
"Beg For It"	2014	Tama Gucci	Non album-single	Producer
"Tasty" (remix)	2020	Shygirl	ALIAS	Producer
"Goin Nuts"	2021	VTSS	Borderline Tenderness	
"Alice" (remix)	2021	Lady Gaga	Dawn of Chromatica	

== Remixes ==
Title	Artist	Year	Album
"XXXO" (Remix)	M.I.A.	2010	Spit or Swallow
"S&M" (LSD Edit)	Rihanna	2011	Non-album singles
"Heartbeat" (Remix)	Childish Gambino	2012	Non-album singles
"I Will" (Remix)	Danny Brown	2012	Non-album singles
"Sure Thing" (Edit)	Miguel	2012	Non-album singles
"Loveeeeeee Song" (LSDXOXO Bootleg)	Rihanna, Future	2013	Non-album singles
"Mad Bitches Link Up" (LSDXOXO Blood Orgy Remix)	BbyMutha	2015	Non-album singles
"Work" (LSDXOXO Guerra Edit)	Ducky	2016	Non-album singles
"Freestyle 4" (Remix)	Kanye West	2016	Fuck Marry Kill
"Grey Gardens (LSDXOXO Remix)"	Case MQ	2025	Non-album singles
"Ass2Mars" (LSDXOXO Remix)"	Machine Girl	2025	Non-album singles
