= Brooke Candy =

American rapper and singer (born 1989)

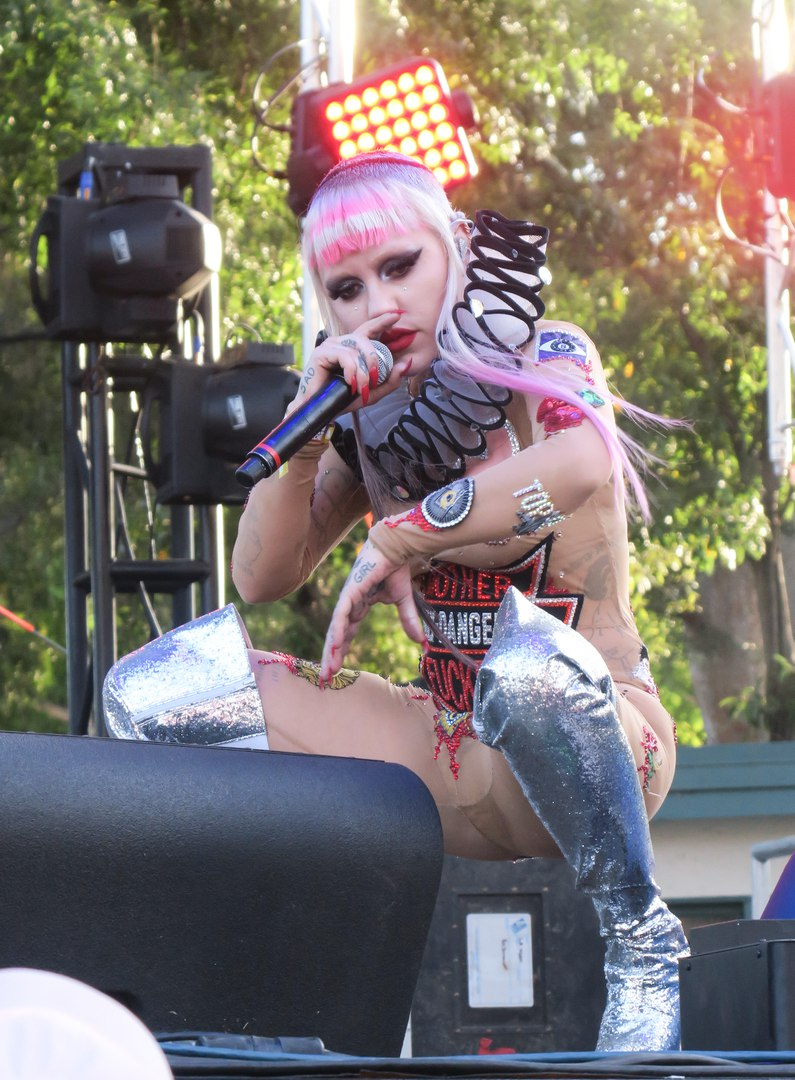
- Candy performing at LA Pride 2017

Background information
- Born: Brooke Dyan Candy; July 20, 1989 (age 37); Agoura Hills, California, U.S.
- Genres: Electropop; pop rap
- Occupations: Rapper; singer; songwriter; tattoo artist
- Works: Discography
- Years active: 2011–present
- Labels: NUXXE; RCA Records; Columbia Records (UK); WonderSound
- Spouse: Kyle England (m. 2019; div. 2026)

Brooke Dyan Candy (born July 20, 1989) is an American rapper, singer, songwriter, and tattoo artist. She lived in Agoura Hills, California and rose to prominence after starring in Grimes' music video for "Genesis" (2012). After its success, Candy's status in the underground scene climbed as she began to release her own music including the songs "Das Me" (2012), "Everybody Does" (2013), and "I Wanna Fuck Right Now" (2013). In 2014, she signed a recording contract with RCA Records and released her debut major label single, "Opulence", with an accompanying EP of the same name. Later, she joined Columbia Records's U.K. roster.

Candy's debut album was originally intended for a 2015 release but experienced a series of delays. Candy went independent in 2017 after a slew of pop-driven singles in 2016, including "Happy Days", "Paper or Plastic" and the moderately-successful "Living Out Loud" (with Sia), and had no label representation.

Throughout 2017 and 2018, she toured alongside Charli XCX and Lizzo, headlining her own tour, the Tie Me Up Tour. Candy released her first full-length album, Sexorcism, in October 2019. After a brief hiatus, she released her sophomore album Candyland in July 2024 and her third studio album Spiral in October 2024, both of which showcased a major pivot into experimental pop music with house and industrial-inspired sounds.

== Early life ==
Brooke Candy was born in Oxnard, California to Tom Candy, the former chief financial officer of Hustler, a pornographic magazine, and a pediatric nurse. She grew up in Agoura Hills, about 10 miles west of Woodland Hills, Los Angeles. She is of Italian descent on her mother's side while her father's side is Orthodox Jewish. Her parents divorced when she was eight. Brooke often spent time in the office of Larry Flynt, the CEO of Hustler during her childhood. At the age of 12, she became addicted to drugs.

After graduating from high school in 2007, Brooke Candy moved to San Francisco with the intent of becoming a photographer. While in the Bay Area, she interacted with "creative”, mostly LGBT circles who introduced her to the idea of creative sexual expression. She eventually returned to Los Angeles after deciding to start a career in music. She lived out of her car for a while, working as a stripper at the Seventh Veil adult club in Hollywood. Her activities as an adult dancer strained her relationship with her parents who disapproved of the job due to its sexual nature. While working as an intern for Rachel Zoe, Candy contacted Flynt, seeking work as a photographer for Hustler, though was instead employed as a mannequin stylist for Hustler store fronts, a job she described as "dress[ing] the mannequins slutty." Later, she repaired her relationship with her parents after they began to realize she was a successful performer in music.

== Career ==
=== 2011–2013: Underground beginnings ===
While working as a mannequin stylist for Hustler store fronts, Candy was approached at a party by producer Khris Lorenz, who was drawn to her outlandish fashion style and invited her to the studio to create a song together. Already amateur experience with publishing song concepts and covers of popular rap songs on her Tumblr blog, Candy and close friend Jesse Saint John worked with Lorenz on Candy's debut single "Das Me", which eventually received an official release on October 16, 2012.

In August 2012, Candy co-starred in the music video for "Genesis" by Canadian musician Grimes. The two met at a party after Candy's fashion caught Grimes' attention. During 2012 and 2013, Candy independently released her first three music videos for the songs, "Das Me", "Everybody Does", and "I Wanna Fuck Right Now" on YouTube. Each video had amassed more than a million views by early 2013. Candy's first major label recording was when she appeared on the track "Cloud Aura" on Charli XCX's debut album True Romance. The two were introduced by Azealia Banks when Candy hosted Banks' Mermaid Ball in Los Angeles. Candy recorded several club-rap songs during her early years in the music industry, eight of which were on her debut mixtape,The Mixtape, self-released on June 25, 2013.

=== 2014–2017: Breakthrough, Opulence, and major-label releases ===
In late 2013, Candy caught singer and songwriter Sia's attention and Candy was contacted via Instagram about writing a song for Sia. Sia eventually ended up executive producing Candy's debut EP, helping her get a record contract and finding in Sia's words, "decent, nice, honest management, and (helping her) make... art (she) want(ed) to make from a place of positive mental health and love". Candy eventually signed with RCA Records in February 2014. "Opulence", co-written with Sia and produced by Diplo, was her first single with the label. Candy performed it on April 3, 2014, at Nicola Formichetti's debut Diesel fashion show in Venice, Italy before releasing it on April 22, 2014, for digital download with its official music video directed by Steven Klein and styled by Formichetti. The video explores the theme of "freaks," a concept conceived by Candy and Formichetti at a drag bar in Tokyo. It features transgender women, drag queens, and gay men who are friends with Candy. "We're all freaks and outcasts and this was meant to empower them," Candy said. Formichetti, Candy, and Klein worked on a V magazine shoot leading to Klein directing "Opulence," the music video to the eponymous lead single from Candy's debut EP. It was released on May 6, 2014 and commended by critics.

On May 16, 2015, Brooke Candy uploaded on Vevo, "A Study in Duality", a video exploring "the various archetypes of today's culture" featuring the instrumental of her song "Happy Days", which was produced by More Mega and released in 2016. The video was directed by Candy and Lil Internet, with Formichetti's fashion direction and Hayley Pisaturo's styling. In August 2015, Candy partnered with MAC Cosmetics on a line of makeup products. She released a single called "Rubber Band Stacks" on August 13 with a music video, directed by Cody Critcheloe and styled by Formichetti on August 17. The song is featured on Madden NFL 16, a video game. Candy released "Happy Days" on January 29 to positive reviews from critics. On February 4, 2016, its video, also styled by Formichetti and directed by Renata Raksha, premiered in Nylon. On May 13, Candy released a song titled "Changes" promoting a second makeup line with MAC. On June 2 a new track called "Nasty" along its music video, directed by Rankin and co-styled by Candy premiered via Hunger TV. On July 7, another single called "Paper or Plastic" was released and received mixed reviews. Responding to criticism regarding her change in musical style, Candy said, "whatever I have to do (to) garner a larger, broader audience to spread my message on a larger scale, I stand for women, I stand for freedom. For love and self-preservation." The music video for the song, directed by Darren Craig, premiered a week later.

Candy's debut album was to be called Daddy Issues and executive produced by labelmate Sia, who was a songwriter on the record. Sia opined that she "was the only person who could really support (Candy) in becoming who (she is) on a grander stage or platform". By 2014, Sia had written at least two songs for the album; one was "Living Out Loud," a single on which Sia was featured and another Cher-inspired track. Other collaborators included Greg Kurstin, Jack Antonoff, and Matthew Koma. Candy released a KDA remix of the previously unreleased song on December 16, 2016. The original and proper single version of the song dropped on February 3, 2017. The same day the song came out, RCA announced Daddy Issues would be released in spring 2017. Aside from music, Candy starred in a fashion film directed by Gracie Otto and Thomas Kerr called Candy Crush, released in January 2017.

=== 2018–2020: Independent career and Sexorcism ===
In 2017, the release for Daddy Issues was canceled after Candy left RCA. Candy spoke to Bullett magazine about her experience with RCA Records, comparing it to The Matrix and expressed relief at leaving the label. She confirmed she was working on an EP to be released during the summer of 2017. The EP would have original music as Sony owned the songs Candy previously created. During June 2017, she toured as a supporting act for Lizzo and performed at LA Pride. Candy premiered the music video for her single "Volcano" on July 7, 2017, co-written by Candy, producer Cory Enemy, Sia, and Jesse Saint John.

Candy released "For Free" as a promotional single on March 14, 2018 only in Germany. It was featured on Germany's Next Topmodel "Hip-Hop Edition" episode, where Candy made an appearance and a music video was filmed during the show. A single called "War" followed. it was intended to be the lead single for Candy's punk rock-inspired second EP titled Who Cares? before it was scrapped due to Candy focusing on new material. The single was written by Candy with Jesse Saint John, MNDR, Peter Wade, Will Ivy and Dave Sharma and released on May 18, 2018, alongside a lyric video, directed by MLMA, a Korean artist. The single "My Sex" featuring Pussy Riot, MNDR, and Mykki Blanco was released on August 17, 2018, with an animated music video directed by Swedish artist Pastelae and made in collaboration with ManyVids. The song was co-written by Charli XCX and produced by MNDR and Wade, with additional production by Trapchat. Candy teamed with Pornhub and Candy directed an erotic film called I Love You, which was released on August 29, 2018.

On November 7, 2018, Candy said releasing a first full-length album was still a possibility. According to her, "Because of my experience with Sony, I must have made like 60 songs and they just never let me put any of them out. I had a full album ready to go and that kind of burnt me a little bit and put a bad taste in my mouth. I questioned my music and my art for a while and just stopped making it completely... I'll release the next couple of songs but I'm planning an album and it's in the works. I don't want to jump ahead and say things because if things don't happen like, godammit!" On November 16, a new single called "Nuts" featuring American songwriter and rapper Lil Aaron was released. The song was written along frequent collaborator Jesse Saint John and Sarah Hudson. On December 12, 2018, she released a joint single along production duo Ojivolta called "Oomph". The music video, directed by Candy herself, debuted on the same day. On December 25, 2018, she released a collection of unreleased tracks for free download including a demo of her 2017 single "Volcano" and collaborations with SOPHIE, Lakewet, Cory Enemy, and other artists. Next was an Asian promotional tour, a Takahiro Nishikawa-directed tour documentary, Tokyo Tour Diary, which premiered on Noisey on January 4, 2019.

On January 10, 2019, Candy confirmed that she had finished her debut album. It was recorded in London with English producer Oscar Scheller along with American rapper Ashnikko, who is based in London. Candy talked about it. "Ashnikko is basically a savant! We agreed she would help with an EP if I helped with a music video, but we had three tracks done in a day... within four days we had twelve strong, cohesive songs!" On February 28, Candy said the album was titled Sexorcism and the first promotional single was "Happy", which came out on March 29, 2019 along its official music video directed by Rankin. Sexorcism was slated for a tentative September 2019 release via Sega Bodega's imprint NUXXE. The other singles and their music videos, "XXXTC" featuring Charli XCX and Maliibu Miitch, "Drip" featuring Erika Jayne, and "FMU" featuring Rico Nasty dropped on July 2, 2019, September 10, 2019, and October 21, 2019. Sexorcism was released on October 25, 2019 and was promoted through a concert tour, the Sexorcism Tour. Additional music videos for the songs, "Freak Like Me", "Nymph", "Honey Pussy", and "Cum" were released throughout 2019 and 2020.

=== 2021–2025: Candyland and Spiral ===
In April 2021, Candy auctioned a non-fungible token of a digital artwork, "I Wanna Be Your Doge", featuring Candy wearing an outfit from the "Genesis" music video alongside a nude Elon Musk on a dog leash. The winner of the auction received a replica of Candy's outfit from the "Genesis" music video tailored to fit their size. Eight other artworks with Candy's name were released as non-fungible tokens throughout 2021 before the website hosting them was taken down. In November 2021, Candy said in Inked that she started tattooing during the COVID-19 pandemic and had since become a tattoo artist. She revealed that she had been working on her second studio album in London and felt it is "more pop and digestible". In May 2022, she announced that her second studio album would be released by NUXXE and was slated for release that summer. With the working title Freaky Princess, the album's lead single "Flip Phone" was released on September 9, 2022, along a self-directed music video produced by Paper along Gentle Monster, a Korean sunglasses brand. On October 14, 2022, Candy collaborated with Croatian musician Only Fire on the single "Yoga", which was initially promoted as the second single of her sophomore album. In an interview with Only Fire in January 2023, Candy discussed the possibility of reworking her upcoming album into an EP and said that she had enough finished material for an EP.

On February 1, 2023, Brooke announced her third single since Sexorcism, "Juicy Fruit", which was released later in the month on Valentine's Day and features backing vocals from Cecile Believe. "Juicy Fruit" had previously been teased several times on Candy's personal TikTok and Instagram accounts. The official '80s-inspired music video directed by Jennifer Juniper Stratford premiered later that day through People. On July 27, 2023, Candy released the song "FMUATW", a "bass-laden" single produced by Cole M.G.N. that had previously been teased in multiple live performances throughout 2022. It had an accompanying music video directed by Candy herself. The single's release was followed with the release of an accompanying three-track remix EP on September 22, 2023. It featured Only Fire, Babynymph, and PC Music's Umru as remixers of the single.

The rollout of Candy's sophomore album shifted throughout 2023, eventually culminating in the release of the song "Safe Word" on February 22, 2024 as the "official lead single" of the upcoming album, showcasing an electropop and house sound. In an interview with V Magazine, who called the song "the start of a new chapter for the artist", Candy remarked that the upcoming album's genre would be "quintessential pop" an "escapist fantasy about being confident and stepping into your power" in favor of her more hypersexual, camp lyrical themes. On May 30, Candy released a follow-up single, "Pills", described by Click as a "pulsating, electro-tinged slice of dirty pop". The third single from the project "Block", co-written by Charli XCX, was released on June 29. Candy also announced that the album was titled Candyland and would be released in July with an accompanying album arriving later in the year. Candyland was released on July 25, 2024.

On August 15, 2024, Candy announced that the companion album to Candyland and her third studio album overall, Spiral, would be released on October 4, 2024. The first and only single from the album, "Next Bitch", was released on September 6, 2024. She embarked on the Candyland Tour throughout North America from September 28, 2024 to October 24, 2024, supported by opening acts BbyAfricka, Tash Blake, and Namasenda. While on tour, Candy announced that the release date of Spiral would now be on October 25 to coincide with the end of the Candyland Tour. The album was released on October 25, 2024 as she performed her final tour date at the Zebulon. On February 4, 2025, Candy released a music video for her then-unreleased song "Pogo", featuring appearances from Tayce and model Dodo Potato. The song was officially released the song as a single three days later on February 7, 2025. She also embarked on the Spiral Tour throughout Europe with ten performances from February 17, 2025 to March 4, 2025.

In October 2025, Candy released a collaborative single with Coucou Chloe titled "Swans" on October 24, 2025. Candy later was a featured artist on the song "CUNT-MIX" by Maleigh Zan along with rappers Infinite Coles and Aliyah's Interlude. Candy's podcast Brooke Candy: Unwrapped premiered on YouTube on November 5, 2025 and then on streaming services on November 11. Each episode of the podcast features an interview with celebrities including Nicole Byer, Margaret Cho, and Amanda Lepore, in addition to other actors and comedians. In December, she featured alongside Peaches on a collaborative remix of "KFC Santeria" by American musician Cain Culto.

=== 2026-present: Upcoming fourth studio album ===
In April 2026, Candy announced that she had signed a record deal with ONErpm. The song "VIP" was released on September 4 as the lead single from her upcoming fourth album and her first output distributed by the label. Its accompanying music video features Candy dressed as a cat with prosthetic stilts and was described by Page Six as "surreal" and "jarring", drawing comparisons to the works of David Lynch. "VIP" showcased a new industrial club-rap sound for Candy and was taken from the first of two albums she had been developing throughout her divorce. In November, she embarked on the five-date Raw Time Tour throughout London, Baltimore, Philadelphia, and Brooklyn, with BbyAfricka joining her as opening acts for the three American dates. She also announced that "Hello", the second single from her upcoming album, would be released on December 4.

== Artistry and public image ==
=== Artistry ===
Candy's music is called electropop and pop-rap, while her more club-rap work is recognized for cyberpunk and a twerk-able style, and springy beats. Thematically, her music is sometimes labeled an intersection between art, sex, and fantasy in addition to sexual liberation and empowerment. She states that becoming sober positively influenced her artistic abilities and alongside COVID-19 lockdowns, it helped her find clarity. She cites Lil' Kim as being an inspiration for her rapping technique and irreverent image.

After leaving RCA, she felt she believed the record deal would give her "a fucking massive platform to spread a conscious, positive message to young girls and the queer community", however she reversed her stance and decided to stay "true to what [she is] good at, making raw and authentic rap music, and just being [herself]."

=== Public image ===
Candy is known for her extreme and versatile fashion style and emphasizing sex. She recalled having been advised by record executives not to create a "sexual" music video for her single, "I Wanna Fuck Right Now." Sia said Candy is a "feminista glam alien" and Grimes called her a "muse." Vogue profiled Candy in July 2014, saying "For all her shape-shifting, perhaps it's helpful to think of Brooke Candy as a tabula rasa whose videos, concerts, and everyday appearances each necessitate a different character. Together, they make her a fashion plate palimpsest."

In an interview, Vice blogger Ali Carman asked Candy if she was offended that her internet persona was considered fake. Candy replied, "My persona is a reality to me, you know... I would never rap and act hood if it wasn't actually my mentality and I wouldn't perform in a super-sexual way if being a stripper wasn't the way I made money." MTV called Candy's look "super hardcore", a "breath of fresh, fearless air", and a prayer answered by the pop goddesses. Saying she is a "freaky princess", The Guardian journalist Michael Cragg agreed with the stripper-turned-rapper's alias and compared her to Xena, the Warrior Princess.

Candy's fashion is said to be a distinctive stripper-meets-Tumblr aesthetic and often collaborates with fashion designer Seth Pratt. After trends in "stan culture", Candy nicknamed her fanbase #FagMob. She has been open about her struggles with bipolar disorder and her methods of managing it through artistic self-expression and tattoos.

=== Activism ===
Candy is a vocal proponent of legalizing sex work and the legality of recreational use of marijuana. She expresses strong feminist ideals and identifies as being a liberal.

== Personal life ==
Candy is openly pansexual. She has an extensive amount of tattoos including the name "Gotti" tattooed on the inside of her forearm for John Gotti, after whom she named her dog when it was a puppy. She hosts a blog dedicated to photography. Candy lived with Seth Pratt as his roommate during her career beginnings. She is a tattoo artist and married Kyle England, a fellow tattooist in 2019. They met when Candy hired him as her tattoo artist. She said that he changed how she feels about "relationships and monogamy." In February 2026, she announced her divorce from England after seven years of marriage.

== Awards and nominations ==
Year	Awards	Work	Category	Result
2014	UK Music Video Awards	"Opulence"	Best Styling	Won
2019	Berlin Music Video Awards	"My Sex"	Best Animation	Nominated

== Discography ==
- Sexorcism (2019)
- Candyland (2024)
- Spiral (2024)

== Tours ==
Headlining

- Tie Me Up Tour (2018)
- The Whore Tour (2019)
- The Sexorcism Tour (2020)
- The Candyland Tour (2024)
- The Spiral Tour (2025)
- The Raw Time Tour (2026)

Supporting

- Charli XCX – Number 1 Angel Tour (2017)
- Lizzo – Good as Hell Tour (2017)
- Cupcakke – The Ephorize Tour (2018)
- Charli XCX – Charli Live Tour (2019)

Promotional

- Opulence US Promotional Tour (2014)
- Asia Tour '18 (2018)

Guest

- Azealia Banks – Mermaid Ball (2012)

== Filmography ==
Film roles
Year	Title	Role	Director	Notes	Ref.
1998	Dennis the Menace Strikes Again!	Girl at diving board	Charles T. Kanganis	Cameo appearance	
2011	Bloodrape	Baby K	Tucker Bennett; Taeer Maymon; Zach Shipko	Short film	
2017	Candy Crush	Herself	Gracie Otto; Thomas Kerr	Fashion film	
2018	Sgualdrina	Herself	Nadia Lee Cohen	Short film	
2018	I Love You	None	Brooke Candy	Erotic film	
2018	Love Hurts	Carrie	Latex Lucifer	Short film	
2019	Tokyo Tour Diary	Herself	Takahiro Nishikawa	Documentary	

Television and web roles
Year	Title	Role	Notes	Ref.
2018	Germany's Next Topmodel	Herself	TV series Episode: "Hip-Hop Edition"	
2018	The Pornhub Podcast with Asa Akira	Herself	Podcast; Episode: "Brooke Candy: Queer Rapper..."	
2020	The Real Housewives of Beverly Hills	Herself	TV series Episode: "The Crown Isn't So Heavy"	
2024	Main Pod Girl	Herself	Podcast; Episode: "Candy Pod Girl"	
2025	Brooke Candy: Unwrapped	Herself	Podcast; Host (all episodes)	
2026	Why Won't You Date Me? with Nicole Byer	Herself	Podcast; Episode: "Brooke Candy Rolled Blunts for a Money Launderer"	

=== Music videos ===
List of music videos where Candy appeared, showing year released, artist, song and directors
Title	Year	Artist	Director(s)	Role(s)	Ref.
"Genesis"	2012	Grimes	Grimes	Protagonist	
"Link Ting (Other Girls)"	2012	Serious Thugs	Racked Films	Web cam stripper	
"Echelon (My Way)"	2013	Angel Haze	SKINNY		
"Dirty Sexy Money" (featuring Charli XCX and French Montana)	2017	David Guetta	Charli XCX; Sarah McColgan		
"Boys"	2017	Charli XCX	Charli XCX; Sarah McColgan	Still photographer	
"Gag Reflex"	2018	Sega Bodega	Brooke Candy	–	
