= Juicy Fruit (Brooke Candy song) =

Single by Brooke Candy
- Released: February 14, 2023
- Genre: Electroclash
- Length: 2:21
- Songwriters: Brooke Candy; Cecile Believe; Jesse Saint John; Nick Weiss
- Producers: Nightfeelings; Cecile Believe; Brooke Candy^{[a]}

Brooke Candy singles chronology
"Yoga" (2022)	"Juicy Fruit" (2023)	"FMUATW" (2023)

Music video
- "Juicy Fruit" on YouTube

"Juicy Fruit" is a song by American rapper Brooke Candy, released as a digital-only single on February 14, 2023. It was released as her third single since the release of her debut album Sexorcism, and her twenty-sixth single overall.

== Background and release ==
Candy first began sharing snippets of "Juicy Fruit" on her Instagram page on December 5, 2022, later hinting at the release of the song in an interview with Croatian producer Only Fire on January 6, 2023. It is a two-minute, twenty-one second electroclash song, which Candy described as "very Peaches", and heavily inspired by the 1980s in terms of fashion and visuals, and early 2000s electro/rock music in terms of sound. "It's unique and a lot different than what I've done in the past. The visual taps into a different era that I cherish. It's a little bit '80s, and I want to run with that," she said of the song in an interview with People. While the song follows her usual lyrical themes of sex-positivity and female empowerment, Candy described the song's creation and filming of the music video as fun and "very, very silly".

The release of "Juicy Fruit" was reportedly meant to coincide with the initial rollout of Candy's still-developing sophomore album Candyland (2024) as the third single released from the project, following 2022's "Flip Phone" and "Yoga", although Candy expressed indecisiveness when considering whether to package the songs as part of a smaller project or to leave them as standalone singles during her January 2023 interview with Only Fire.

The song was written by Brooke Candy and Jesse Saint John, with production and further songwriting handled by Cecile Believe and American producer Nightfeelings, as well as co-production from Candy herself. Cecile Believe contributed backing vocals to the song as well.

== Music video ==
The official music video was released through Paper later that Valentine's Day, directed by J.J. Stratford and filmed on authentic 80s equipment. In the video, Candy plays a guitar and eats cherries, dressed in outfits "inspired by Cher, Pete Burns, milk maiden porn stars, and Robert Palmer". It was also her first music video since the release of Sexorcism that was not directed by Candy herself.

== Credits ==
- Vocals – Brooke Candy
- Songwriting – Brooke Candy, Jesse Saint John, Nicholas Weiss, Cecile Believe
- Production – Nightfeelings, Cecile Believe, Brooke Candy^{[a]}
- Additional vocals – Cecile Believe

Notes

- ^{^[a]} signifies a co-producer.

== Release history ==
Release history and formats for "Juicy Fruit"
Region	Format	Date
Various	Digital download; streaming	February 14, 2023
