= Happy Days (Brooke Candy song) =

Single by Brooke Candy
- Released: January 29, 2016
- Genre: Electropop
- Length: 3:42
- Label: RCA
- Songwriters: Cassie Davis; Sean Mullins; Ali Tamposi; Olivia Waithe; Talay Riley
- Producer: More Mega

Brooke Candy singles chronology
"Rubber Band Stacks" (2015)	"Happy Days" (2016)	"Changes" (2016)

Music video
- "Happy Days" on YouTube

"Happy Days" is a song recorded by American singer Brooke Candy. It was written by Cassie Davis, Sean Mullins, Ali Tamposi, Olivia Waithe, Talay Riley, and produced by More Mega for Candy's unreleased album Daddy Issues. It was released as the second single from the record, following the previously released "Rubber Band Stacks". In 2017, Candy left RCA to focus on releasing a second extended play (EP), and the release of Daddy Issues was canceled.

Moving away from the past rap sound from her 2014 EP Opulence, the track is an electropop song that revolves around the pursuit of happiness and the struggles involved. Critical response to "Happy Days" was mixed; some music critics praised the sound while another criticized it alongside the other promotional singles for the album. Renata Raksha directed the song's music video, which features Candy portraying three characters based on parts of her psyche. The video received positive feedback from Elle UK.

== Background and release ==
Brooke Candy announced the release of "Happy Day" on January 25, 2016, by releasing footage of its music video through her Instagram account. The single was released on January 29, 2016. Produced by More Mega, "Happy Days" is written by Cassie Davis, Sean Mullins, Ali Tamposi, Olivia Waithe, Talay Riley. The track uses the music from her previously released video "A Study In Duality". A remix package was released on April 1, 2017, to promote the song.

In 2017, the release for Daddy Issues was canceled after Candy left RCA to record an extended play (EP) that returned to her original punk-inspired rap sound. In an interview with Noisey, she clarified: "Sony and I parted ways – I made an entire album with them, but technically they own that music".

== Composition and lyrics ==
The single marks a shift from Candy's previous material, as she began to develop a more pop-friendly sound described as "gloomy electro-pop". Candy stated about her new musical direction: "In recent past I’ve found myself undergoing endless transformations through emotional states of being and it is reflected through changing vocal styles and aesthetic approaches… I am exploring sounds that are bit more polished and digestible." She also talked about the lyrics's meaning on an interview with i-D saying: "This song addresses the struggle I've had looking for "happy days" in every possible easy way, only to find out that you can't short cut the constantly on-going process of finding your version of happiness."

== Critical reception ==
"Happy Days" received mainly a positive response from music critics. Megan Williams form IDOL Magazine praised the song's "sincere lyrics and catchy hook". She also remarked how Candy managed to keep her natural attitude despite the musical shift compared to her early material. Mike Wass from Idolator gave a positive review, noting its accessibility compared to Candy's past material as well as its relatable chorus. Wass was more critical of it during his review of the follow-up single "Living Out Loud" (2017), including it in his list of the "string of flops" released to promote Daddy Issues. Popjustice staff considered that the song was set to make Candy "an unexpected 2016-slaying pop superstar". BlackBook's Justin Moran stated that the song marked Candy's "official transition from underground rap to provocative pop." Jordan Miller, from Breathe Heavy, noted the song's "radio-friendly" sound while remaining true to both Candy's persona and listener. Daisy Jones from Dazed included the track in its February 2016 "The only tracks you need to hear in February" playlist. Wonderland Magazine's staff described the song as a "true banger".

== Music video ==
The video, directed by Renata Raksha and styled by Nicola Formichetti, was premiered on February 4, 2016, via Nylon. The visual explores how people deal with daily life's "highs and lows". It also pictures Candy's personal experience about dealing with fame. She is represented via different characters based in what she considers the three versions of her psyche; the innocent, the diva and the crazy. Elle UK named it on its premiere date the site's "video of the day". A behind the scenes video was also released on February 26, 2016.

== Track listings ==
Digital download
No.	Title	Length
1.	"Happy Days"	3:42

Remixes
No.	Title	Length
1.	"Happy Days" (Rare Candy Remix)	5:31
2.	"Happy Days" (Bit Error Remix)	4:15
3.	"Happy Days" (Nomero Remix)	4:28
4.	"Happy Days" (Cosmic Dawn Remix)	4:49
Total length:		19:04

== Personnel ==
Taken from digital download liner notes.

- Songwriting – Cassie Davis, Sean "Snob Scrilla" Mullins, Ali Tamposi, Olivia Waithe, Talay Riley
- Production – More Mega
- Mixing engineer – Erik Madrid
- Assistant engineer – Vicent Vu

== Release history ==
Region	Format	Date	Label
Worldwide	Digital download; streaming	January 29, 2016	RCA
