= Candyland (Brooke Candy album) =

Studio album by Brooke Candy
- Released: July 25, 2024
- Genres: Hip house; futurepop; experimental pop
- Length: 37:17
- Producers: Slush Puppy; Lil Jabba; Cass Lowe; Jahs; Brasko; Jordan Palmer; Dylan Brady; A. G. Cook; Federico Vindver; Tobias Wincorn; Jarom Su'a; Sophie Gray; Karma Kid; ATLGrandma; Liam Benayon; Freedo; Babynymph; DAGR; Umru; Felix Lush; Only Fire

Brooke Candy chronology
Sexorcism (2019)	Candyland (2024)	Spiral (2024)

Singles from Candyland
- 1. "Safe Word" Released: February 22, 2024; 2. "Pills" Released: May 30, 2024; 3. "Block" Released: June 27, 2024

Candyland (stylized in all caps) is the second studio album by American rapper Brooke Candy, released on July 25, 2024. It is her first finalized project since the release of her debut album, Sexorcism (2019). It features a wider array of genres and styles than the largely trap-based sound showcased throughout her previous album, a choice which Candy has attributed to the desire to "give a taste of each individual facet of [her] brain", ultimately describing the album as "candy-coated pop".

== Background ==
Following the release of her debut album, Sexorcism (2019), which received mixed reviews from professional critics, Candy took a hiatus from music to focus on her newly developing tattooing career throughout the COVID-19 pandemic. Although music videos for her songs "Honey Pussy" and "Cum" were released during this time, no new music was released throughout 2020 or 2021, with Candy even being named a "former rapper" in an article by Exclaim! in April 2021. Candy later admitted that she had been "on the verge of quitting" during this time, which she attributed to feeling overlooked and "invisible" as a musician.

In an interview with Inked in November 2021, Candy revealed that she had been recording new material in the studio, having changed her mind about abandoning music as a career after being invited back into the studio by old collaborators. She also discussed her willingness to re-sign to a major record label after having learned enough about the inner workings of the music industry, announcing that production of her sophomore studio album had recently begun in London that year. In May 2022, an article was published by Paper Magazine in which Candy revealed that new music would be arriving that summer, citing Britney Spears as an inspiration and naming producer duo DAGR as an early collaborator on the then-untitled album. Candy also highlighted the increase in creative control she would be implementing over her upcoming music and hinted at experimentation with new genres, stating "what I'm working on now feels different and not what people who know me should expect. It's still me – I'm still a Boss Bitch – but three years ago feels like 30 years ago, and we're all different now."

== Promotion ==
=== Singles ===
On August 29, 2022, Candy formally announced the upcoming release of her new single "Flip Phone", her first song in nearly three years, which had previously been performed at select music festivals over the summer among a small batch of other then-unreleased songs. "Flip Phone" was officially released on September 9, along with an accompanying music video sponsored by Paper Magazine and Gentle Monster, directed by Candy herself. The song featured a strikingly bubblegum pop and hyperpop sound, contrasting much of Candy's previous hip hop-adjacent outputs, which Candy attributed to "[having] a lot of fun experimenting with new forms of pop music". It was described as the first taster from Candy's second album, which briefly had the working title Freaky Princess.

On October 14, 2022, a second single "Yoga" was released in collaboration with Croatian musician Only Fire, featuring influences of house music, as well as elements of techno. The song would later go on to appear as the sixteenth and final track of Candyland and was accompanied by a visualizer directed by and starring American dancer Lexee Smith. This single was followed by a third song, "Juicy Fruit" on February 14, 2023. The song features electroclash-themed production and backing vocals from Cecile Believe, and Candy described the track as "very Peaches". In a promotional interview with Only Fire around this time, Candy expressed indecisiveness on whether or not "Juicy Fruit" and her previous two singles would end up on a completed project, debating on including them on an EP or leaving them as standalone singles. A fourth previously teased single was released on July 27, 2023, "FMUATW", which was described by Candy in a Paper Magazine article as "the newest installment in a string of horny singles [she] wanted to release through the past year". It was followed by an accompanying three-track remix EP on September 22, featuring contributions from Only Fire, BABYNYMPH, and PC Music's Umru.

Candy released the official lead single from the album, "Safe Word", on February 22, 2024. It featured a distinctly more futurepop and house-influenced sound than Candy's previously released singles, describing it in an interview with HypeBae as "a dirty, dark fantasy" that summed up the theme of the album it would later be released as a part of. In an interview with Clash, Candy explained that she had rerouted the direction she would be taking with her sophomore album, claiming that she was "in the final stages of wrapping up most of the music for it", also voicing her plans to embark on a tour in promotion of the album. She also confirmed that the album would still be majorly pop, stating "it's going to be really colourful, really fresh, and I'm going to try to create work that is different from what I've made in the past, even more beautiful and exciting than anything I've created before. I'm very proud of the music. I think the music is the best music I've ever made. So I'm very, very excited to share it." "Safe Word" also received a music video directed by Candy's husband Kyle England, who she confirmed would also be directing her next two videos as well. In the video, Candy debuts a bright-orange hairstyle, citing Madonna as an inspiration for the stylistic change to represent the album's era, stating "you can say that the color orange is a massive inspiration to me now and is the driving force behind everything I'm doing. It quite literally permeates every aspect of my life now."

On May 30, 2024, Candy released the song "Pills" as the second single from her new album, which she also announced would be titled Candyland. "Pills is a nod to the person I was when I first started to make music. It makes fun of how superficial the world can be. It's about nihilism, being wild, and having fun. I just want to have a good time and be crazy because that's where my head is right now. Right now, in my life, that's where all of my music leads", she stated in an article by Click. On June 27, 2024, Candy released the third and final single from the album, "Block", which was co-written by Charli XCX and produced by A. G. Cook and Dylan Brady. She also revealed that Candyland was a double album and would be split into two volumes; one that would be released on July 25, and the second slated for release later in the year. Music videos for "Pills" and "Block" were also released respectively, both directed by Kyle England.

On August 15, Candy announced that her third album, Spiral, would be released as a standalone studio album in October 2024, containing then-unreleased songs from recording sessions of Candyland and dubbed a "sister album" to the record. It was released on October 25, 2024.

=== Tour ===
Candy embarked on the Candyland Tour throughout North America, beginning on September 28 and ending on October 24.

Candyland Tour
- Tour by Brooke Candy
- Associated album: Candyland
- Start date: September 28, 2024
- End date: October 24, 2024
- Legs: 1
- No. of shows: 16
- Supporting acts: BbyAfricka; Tash Blake; Namasenda^{[a]}

Brooke Candy concert chronology
- The Sexorcism Tour; The Candyland Tour; The Spiral Tour

List of concerts, showing date, city, country, venue, and opening act
Date	City	Country	Venue	Opening act
September 28, 2024	Santa Cruz	United States	The Catalyst	BbyAfricka; Tash Blake
September 30, 2024	Portland	United States	Holocene	BbyAfricka; Tash Blake
October 1, 2024	Vancouver	Canada	Fortune Sound Club	BbyAfricka; Tash Blake
October 2, 2024	Seattle	United States	Neumos	BbyAfricka; Tash Blake
October 4, 2024	Reno	United States	The Holland Project	BbyAfricka; Tash Blake
October 5, 2024	San Francisco	United States	Rickshaw Stop	BbyAfricka; Tash Blake
October 10, 2024	Chicago	United States	Empty Bottle	Namasenda; Tash Blake
October 11, 2024	Detroit	United States	El Club Detroit	Namasenda; Tash Blake
October 12, 2024	Toronto	Canada	Velvet Underground	Namasenda; Tash Blake
October 13, 2024	Montreal	Canada	Bar le Ritz PDB	Namasenda; Tash Blake
October 15, 2024	Boston	United States	Brighten Music Hall	BbyAfricka; Tash Blake
October 16, 2024	Brooklyn	United States	Elsewhere	BbyAfricka; Tash Blake
October 17, 2024	Philadelphia	United States	Johnny Brenda's	BbyAfricka; Tash Blake
October 18, 2024	Washington	United States	Union Stage	BbyAfricka; Tash Blake
October 19, 2024	Cleveland Heights	United States	Grog Shop	BbyAfricka; Tash Blake
October 24, 2024	Los Angeles	United States	Zebulon	BbyAfricka; Tash Blake

- ^{^[a]} Although Namasenda was scheduled as an opening act for all tour dates from October 10 through October 24, she announced her inability to continue performing on the tour after Candy's third and final Canadian date, citing "unforeseen circumstances". BbyAfricka rejoined the tour on October 15 as an opening act for all remaining dates.

== Track listing ==
Candyland
No.	Title	Writer(s)	Producer(s)	Length
1.	"Lollipop" (featuring Ariana Madix)	Beverly Ross; Julius Dixson	Lil Jabba	1:59
2.	"Das Still Me"	Brooke Candy; Edwin Loftjet; Sean Ellmore	Slush Puppy	2:16
3.	"Crucify My Love"	Candy; Cass Lowe; Janée Bennett; July Jones	Lowe	2:42
4.	"Pills"	Candy; Sam Catalano; Jordan Brasko Gable; Jason Hahs	Slush Puppy; Jahs	1:51
5.	"ATM"	Candy; Catalano; Gable	Slush Puppy; Brasko	2:12
6.	"Juicy" (featuring Rickey Thompson)	Candy; Jesse Saint John; Federico Vindver; Tobias Wincorn; Zae Lay Low; Jarom Su'a; Sophie Grajcer	Vindver; Wincorn; Su'a; Sophie Gray	2:09
7.	"Safe Word"	Candy; Jonathan Bach; Jordan Palmer	Palmer	2:06
8.	"Respectfully"	Candy; Sam Knowles; Liam Hall	Karma Kid; Atlgrandma	2:15
9.	"Crisis" (featuring Lozeak)	Candy; Lauren Eakens; Jared Gelman; Liam Benayon; Catalano	Benayon; Slush Puppy	2:40
10.	"Block"	Candy; Charlotte Emma Aitchison; Alexander Guy Cook; Dylan Brady; Saint John; Gigi Grombacher	Brady; A. G. Cook	2:10
11.	"Fish"	Candy; Clara Blom Christensen; Fridolin Walcher; Bennett; Gina Kuschke	Freedo	2:07
12.	"Dirty Money" (featuring Deto Black)	Candy; Chloe Angelides; Tavon Thompson; Adetoun Tejuoso	Babynymph	2:10
13.	"Frink"	Candy; Catherine Leavy; Ceci Gomez; Veronika Wyman	DAGR	2:39
14.	"Go Go Go"	Candy; Leavy; Umru Rothenberg	Umru	1:50
15.	"Dirty Little Freak"	Candy; Grombacher; Felix Lush	Lush	3:16
16.	"Yoga" (featuring Only Fire)	Candy; Only Fire; Nick Weiss; Saint John	Only Fire	2:59
Total length:				37:17
