= Patia Borja =

American Internet celebrity

- Born: 1992 or 1993 (age 33–34)
- Education: School of Visual Arts (dropped out)
- Occupation: Internet celebrity
- Years active: 2015–present
- Known for: @patiasfantasyworld
- Website: patia-borja.com

Patia Borja (born 1992 or 1993) is an American Internet celebrity. She is best known for creating the Instagram meme account @patiasfantasyworld.

== Life and career ==
Borja was raised in Jacksonville, Florida as an only child to an immigrant mother. She became a popular user on the microblogging website Tumblr under the name MaisonMartinMarijuana, which prompted her to move to New York City with other Internet friends in 2010 at age 17 to attend the School of Visual Arts for graphic design, though she dropped out after her first year. In 2015, she started the Instagram party blog Bundle Update, which featured pictures of people using cocaine and was eventually shut down. She also did sex work through Backpage.

Borja launched the Instagram account @patiasfantasyworld in 2017 as a private finsta. She eventually made it public and it began to gain followers after Borja publicly criticized a white art curator for wearing cornrows. By 2020, the account was an Internet meme account owned by her and two other friends—River Moon and Alaina Berry, who joined in December 2019—and focused on posting ironic and irreverent memes, such as deep-fried screenshots of Facebook posts and tweets from Black Twitter. In 2020, during the George Floyd protests, the account began posting more politically charged content, including the "Fantasy World Master List of Resources on How to Dismantle Systemic Racism" database. The account grew in followers from 20,000 in December 2019 to 100,000 in June 2020.

Borja modeled in the campaign for underwear brand Parade's collaboration with Juicy Couture in December 2020 and in the second part of Mugler's spring 2021 collection video in March 2021. By 2022, @patiasfantasyworld had almost 600,000 followers. By 2023, Borja was working as a software engineer and DJing under the name DJ Juicy.
