= Drip (Brooke Candy song) =

Single by Brooke Candy featuring Erika Jayne

from the album Sexorcism
- Released: September 10, 2019
- Genre: Pop rap; trap; experimental pop
- Length: 2:13
- Songwriters: Brooke Candy; Salvador Navarrete; Jesse Saint John; Ashton Casey; Oscar Scheller
- Producers: Sega Bodega; Raf Riley; Oscar Scheller

Brooke Candy singles chronology
"XXXTC" (2019)	"Drip" (2019)	"FMU" (2019)

Erika Jayne singles chronology
"Cars" (2018)	"Drip" (2019)	"Drip Drop" (2023)

Music video
- "Drip" on YouTube

"Drip" is a song by American rapper Brooke Candy, featuring American singer Erika Jayne. It was released on September 10, 2019 through NUXXE as the second single from Candy's debut studio album Sexorcism, and Candy's twenty-second single overall.

== Background and release ==
Writing and production on "Drip" began in early 2019 among twelve songs written and composed in collaboration with English musician Oscar Scheller and American rapper Ashnikko. Candy later sought out Erika Jayne for a collaboration on the song, stating in an interview with Billboard: "Erika has a power to her. She’s a force that I’ve never felt before. When she walks into a room, she makes you want to sit up and listen to what she has to say […] This woman gets what she wants, and I knew I had to collaborate with her. She’s fierce as f–k and I love her so much." Jayne said of Candy in an interview after the song's release: "The collaboration felt natural and authentic to our aesthetic. I love that Brooke is fearless and very confident in who she is, which made me want to work with her even more!"

MTV praised the song for its "bouncy, circus-like beat" and its "frighteningly realistic moans of the highest hedonistic degree," as well as its explicit lyricism and atmospheric sound. In addition to Oscar Scheller's production on "Drip", English record producer Raf Riley and NUXXE label-owner Sega Bodega were recruited to provide their own contributions to the production of the song in the months leading up to its official release.

The song was featured in the 2024 comedy-drama film Anora, which was released October 18, 2024.

== Music video ==
In the official music video for "Drip," Brooke Candy and Erika Jayne dance and perform in black catsuits surrounded by a pure white backdrop. The video is themed heavily around domestic cats, featuring cans of cat food labeled "Pussy Drip," as well as cat toys, balls of yarn, and milk—a frequent visual innuendo for semen. MTV described the video as "an alternative, NSFW version of the upcoming CGI Cats film."Billboard likened the outfits worn by Candy and Jayne throughout the video to Michelle Pfeiffer's depiction of Catwoman in the 1992 film Batman Returns.

== Personnel ==
- Vocals – Brooke Candy, Erika Jayne
- Songwriting – Brooke Candy, Sega Bodega, Jesse Saint John, Ashnikko, Oscar Scheller
- Production – Sega Bodega, Raf Riley, Oscar Scheller
