= Flip Phone (song) =

Single by Brooke Candy
- Released: September 9, 2022
- Genre: Bubblegum pop; hyperpop
- Length: 3:15
- Songwriters: Brooke Candy; Jesse Saint John; Janée Bennett; Lucia Fairfull; BOBBIE
- Producer: BOBBIE

Brooke Candy singles chronology
"FMU" (2019)	"Flip Phone" (2022)	"Yoga" (2022)

Music video
- "Flip Phone" on YouTube

"Flip Phone" is a song by American rapper Brooke Candy, her twenty-fourth single overall and intended as the lead single from her second studio album, which was originally slated for release in summer 2022. The song was released on September 9, 2022, and marked Candy's first release of new music in nearly three years, her last being her debut studio album Sexorcism (2019).

== Background and release ==
After the release of Sexorcism in October 2019, Candy embarked on a musical hiatus and took up tattooing as a hobby during the COVID-19 pandemic before pursuing a career of it. In a November 2021 interview with Inked Magazine, Candy admitted to feeling ready to quit music in favor of a tattooing career during the pandemic, but that she had quickly changed her mind after old collaborators invited her back into the studio to create music. She discussed her willingness to sign to another major record label after learning enough about the music industry and mentioned that she had been working on the production of her sophomore studio album in London.

In an article by Paper Magazine published in May 2022, Candy announced her official return to music and teased the release of her sophomore studio album, which was initially slated for summer 2022 and reportedly showcased Candy's music heading in a different direction, highlighting the "empowering" creative control she had over her music. After performing "Flip Phone" and other new songs at Pride and LadyLand Festival as well as teasing several snippets of it on social media, Candy formally announced the release of "Flip Phone" on August 29, making it available for pre-order as a digital download until its official release on September 9. "It’s been three years since my last music release so this moment doesn’t feel real. Not until I hear it blaring in a club or I’m performing it in front of people. I can’t wait for that. This song is my favorite to date, and there’s so much more coming. I’m in the driver's seat… or when you watch my new video, on top of the car," Candy stated in an interview with Office Magazine.

For the making of "Flip Phone", Candy worked with Manchester-based songwriter Jin Jin, Lucia Fairfull of Lucia & The Best Boys, Scottish producer BOBBIE, and frequent collaborator Jesse Saint John, while also serving as a co-writer of the song herself. In an interview with Paper published on the day of the song's release, Candy elaborated on her newfound creative control over her music: "Before, there were times when I would delegate the writing of a song to another artist and now I would never do that. If I’m going to put a song out, I need to write it. If I’m going to make a video, I have to direct it."

== Composition ==
"Flip Phone" is a three-minute, fifteen-second pop-rap song, showcasing a more experimental, club-influenced sound while featuring Candy's usual raunchy lyrics and a "sultry" chorus on top of a "subwoofer shaking bass". Candy has named Christina Aguilera, Britney Spears, and the Pussycat Dolls as influences of the song. The song has also been likened to bubblegum pop and hyperpop.

== Music video ==
The official music video for "Flip Phone" was released on September 9, 2022, produced by Paper Magazine in collaboration with Gentle Monster and was self-directed by Candy herself. Aesthetically, it was described by Paper Magazine as a "raunchy twist on Y2K nostalgia" and features Candy dressed in an outfit inspired by Lara Croft's black, long-sleeved outfit in Lara Croft: Tomb Raider. Candy also cited Pamela Anderson's depiction of Barb Wire in the 1996 superhero film of the same name as a major influence of the music video, as well as The Fast and the Furious and Æon Flux aesthetically. Candy and her team rented a rain room in Los Angeles to record scenes where Candy performs on top of a "glittery pink car" in a chainmail bikini outfit.

== Credits ==
- Songwriting – Brooke Candy, Bobbie, Jesse Saint John, Jin Jin, and Lucia Fairfull
- Production – Bobbie

== Release history ==
Release history and formats for "Flip Phone"
Region	Format	Date
Various	Digital download; streaming	September 9, 2022
