= FMU (song) =

Single by Brooke Candy featuring Rico Nasty

from the album Sexorcism
- Released: October 21, 2019
- Genre: Rap; electronic
- Length: 3:18
- Songwriters: Brooke Candy; Jesse Saint John; Maria-Cecilia Simone Kelly
- Producer: Boys Noize

Brooke Candy singles chronology
"Drip" (2019)	"FMU" (2019)	"Flip Phone" (2022)

Rico Nasty singles chronology
"Fashion Week" (2019)	"FMU" (2019)	"Stomp and Grind" (2019)

Music video
- "FMU" on YouTube

"FMU" (initialism for "Fuck Me Up") is a song by American rapper Brooke Candy, featuring fellow American rapper Rico Nasty and produced by German musician Boys Noize. It was released on October 21, 2019 through NUXXE as the third and final single from Candy's debut album Sexorcism and her twenty-third single overall.

== Background and release ==
According to Candy in a track-by-track breakdown of Sexorcism, production of "FMU" began when Boys Noize, whom Candy had "been obsessed with for probably 10 years", reached out to Candy for a potential collaboration and sent her the instrumental for the song. During the writing stage, Candy was inspired by a trip to Bend, Oregon where she had been invited to an all-female biker convention that had taken a liking to her 2018 song "My Sex". "The entire time I was there, I was thinking to myself, 'What the fuck kind of song can I make now that these chicks would listen to on their journey? What lyrical content would they vibe with?'"

After writing and recording vocals for the song, Candy sent it back to Boys Noize, who was unhappy with the cadence on the second verse and recruited Rico Nasty for a feature on the song. "I got a photo of him and Rico in the studio, and they were both giving me the thumbs-up, and it was like, 'Hey!' And I was like, 'No, you didn’t.'" Candy has named "FMU" the most feminist song on Sexorcism, saying of Rico Nasty "to have Rico on this track really took it to the edge of what I’ve always wanted to create. She’s a mother, a badass, and is carving her own path."

"FMU" heavily samples the song "I Sit on Acid" by Lords of Acid, which appears on their debut album Lust. it takes these samples from the soul wax remix.

== Music video ==
The music video for "FMU" was directed by Brooke Candy herself, and the recording of the music video was completed before Rico Nasty had recorded her verse on the track, thus she does not make a visual appearance. In contrast to the other music videos from Sexorcism, "FMU" features a more nature-based theme, shot among an all-female motorcycle club in the forests of Bend, Oregon. Candy is dressed in black leather chaps, sunglasses, and cowboy garb throughout the video, riding on the back of a motorcycle, standing on destroyed cars in a junkyard, and dancing in a field of llamas, as well as dancing and performing with the other members of the motorcycle club. The video ends with a credits roll backed by a reversed clip of Candy wading into an Oregon lake. The aesthetic and styling of the music video for "FMU" has been likened by MTV and Paper Magazine to a combination between punk rock and the Old West.

== Credits ==
- Songwriting – Brooke Candy, Jesse Saint John, Rico Nasty
- Production – Boys Noize
- Additional vocals – Mimi Wade

== Release history ==
Release history and formats for "FMU"
Region	Format	Date
Various	Digital download; streaming	October 21, 2019
