= XXXTC =

Single by Brooke Candy featuring Charli XCX and Maliibu Miitch

from the album Sexorcism
- Released: July 2, 2019
- Genre: Rap; trap
- Length: 3:18
- Songwriters: Brooke Candy; Charlotte Aitchison; Jennifer Jade Roberts; Ashton Casey; Oscar Scheller
- Producer: Oscar Scheller

Brooke Candy singles chronology
"Happy" (2019)	"XXXTC" (2019)	"Drip" (2019)

Charli XCX singles chronology
"Dream Glow" (2019)	"XXXTC" (2019)	"Gone" (2019)

Maliibu Miitch singles chronology
"Celine" (2019)	"XXXTC" (2019)	"Double O" (2020)

Music video
- "XXXTC" on YouTube

"XXXTC" (pronounced "ecstasy") is a song by American rapper Brooke Candy featuring British singer Charli XCX and American rapper Maliibu Miitch. It was released on July 2, 2019 through NUXXE as the lead single from Candy's debut studio album, Sexorcism (2019), and her twenty-first single overall.

== Background and release ==
Development on "XXXTC" took place around early 2019, where Candy embarked on a trip to the UK to collaborate with London-based rapper and songwriter Ashnikko and English producer Oscar Scheller, both playing significant roles in the writing and production of Sexorcism, which would later release in October 2019. Upon the release of "XXXTC" as the lead single of the project, Candy stated about the song "The album was put together in four days and 'XXXTC' was the first song that was made. To us, it was the most special and the most fun. It’s a female-empowering stripper anthem about owning your own sexuality, but I think it has universal appeal. Hopefully everyone thinks so, too!" Candy elaborated further in a later interview with Billboard. "We went in knowing that we wanted to make something that felt like a stripper anthem…something that made you feel good and want to dance, but also something that was highly sexual in nature, promotes the divine feminine and speaks to how important women are in helping human sexuality evolve."

"XXXTC" marks the third collaboration between Brooke Candy and Charli XCX, following True Romance's "Cloud Aura" (2013) and Pop 2's "I Got It" (2017). When speaking on Charli XCX's involvement in the song, Candy stated "[w]hen I mentioned the track to Charli, I said 'the song is called XXXTC and you’re Charli XCX, so you might as well be on it.' And she was like, 'Uh, I don’t know about that, but honestly the song is good so I’ll do it.'" Conversely, "XXXTC" marks the first collaboration between Candy and Maliibu Miitch, whom Candy likened to the "Foxy Brown of [her] generation" and praised for her vocal inflections and for writing all of her own music. Maliibu Miitch also spoke on her feature on the song in an article published by Billboard, stating "When I first heard it ["XXXTC"], I was super hype. I couldn’t wait to get in the booth, write my verse and lay it down. Brooke is such a talented artist so it was a lot of fun creating magic with her."

== Music video ==
On July 23, "XXXTC" received an official music video directed by Dejan Jovanovic and Luke Abby. While Charli XCX did not appear in the music video, substituted for by an "animated cyborg that strongly resembles [her]", Maliibu Miitch did feature in it, performing in skimpy clothing alongside Candy. She later spoke about her experience in the music video, stating "it's so funny because [Candy] styled me for the video. She came out and said 'Maliibu you're wearing this,' and it was literally like a shoe string. And I was like, 'Oh my God, is that going to hold everything together?' The whole time, I was thinking, 'If pussy pop out, just act like it's regular.' But it was so much fun."

V Magazine stated that Candy's music video for the song "brings authenticity to her stand in the movement in an exhibition of empowered women who remain comfortable in their own skin", while The Fader described the imagery of the video as "a hyper-slick wonderland where butterflies live in platform heels, snakes slither with full sleeves of tattoos, and sexed-up clones run abundant".

== Credits ==
- Songwriting – Brooke Candy, Charli XCX, Maliibu Miitch, Ashnikko, and Oscar Scheller
- Production – Oscar Scheller

== Release history ==
Release history and formats for "XXXTC"
Region	Format	Date
Various	Digital download; streaming	July 2, 2019
