= Das Me =

Single by Brooke Candy
- Released: October 16, 2012
- Genre: Hip hop; pop rap; art pop
- Length: 4:03
- Songwriters: Brooke Candy; Jesse Saint John
- Producer: Khris Lorenz

Brooke Candy singles chronology
"Das Me" (2012)	"Everybody Does" (2013)

Music video
- "Das Me" on YouTube

"Das Me" is the debut single by American rapper Brooke Candy, released as a standalone single on October 16, 2012. It was written by Candy herself with Jesse Saint John and produced by American musician Khris Lorenz.

== Background and release ==
In her early twenties, Brooke Candy lived out of her car and worked as a stripper for the Seventh Veil club in Hollywood, as well as an intern for Rachel Zoe. She adopted an alarming, vibrant style and appearance that attracted the attention of producer Khris Lorenz, who approached her at a party and invited her into the studio to "try and make a song together". Candy and close friend Jesse Saint John, who also rose to musical significance as a songwriter through the chance encounter, worked with Lorenz on Candy's first song, which eventually became "Das Me".

Throughout 2011, Candy began to establish herself as a rapper and continued working on music with Lorenz, who also produced the song "Trill" from her 2013-released debut mixtape The Mixtape, among a number of unreleased songs. Candy posted freestyles and snippets of then-unreleased music on her Tumblr blog, where she had already amassed a steady following through her photography. After circulating the internet for several months, "Das Me" received an official release on October 16, 2012, with the official music video being uploaded to Candy's YouTube channel on the same day.

Lyrically, "Das Me" is themed around female empowerment and sex-positive feminism, a theme that would go on to define her image in the future, as well as reclamation of female sexuality. Candy stated in a 2014 interview with The New Zealand Herald that the song was written from a place of pent-up anger in response to slut-shaming and homophobia that she had experienced throughout her life.

== Music video ==
Candy's first music video appearance was in Canadian musician Grimes' music video for her single "Genesis", which was released in August 2012. She sported pink dreadlocks and performed in a metallic bodysuit that loosely resembled a suit of armor, which she also wore in her own music video for "Das Me". The video was shot in Rodeo Drive in Beverly Hills, Candy's town of residence at the time.

Fact said of the video: "'Das Me' is so oversexed – both lyrically and visually – that it would make Lil' Kim blush. [Candy's] wordplay is filthy and funny, even if her flow resembles that of contemporary Kreayshawn, if a bit sharper." In an interview with Mykki Blanco, Candy stated her intentions behind the video: "I wanted it to be a visual representation of myself and the world I've created. It's where I am right now. It's an aesthetic combination of all the different cultures I experience, with imagery I imagined. I wanted to create a video that, as a viewer, I would want to watch."

== Credits ==
- Songwriting – Brooke Candy and Jesse Saint John
- Production – Khris Lorenz

== Release history ==
Release history and formats for "Das Me"
Region	Format	Date
Various	Digital download; streaming	October 16, 2012
