= Dedicated 2 Disrespect =

EP by LSDXOXO
- Released: May 14, 2021
- Genre: Baltimore club; hip house; techno-pop; ballroom; deep house
- Length: 16:21
- Label: XL Recordings
- Producer: LSDXOXO

LSDXOXO chronology
Waiting 2 Exhale (2020)	Dedicated 2 Disrespect (2021)	Delusions of Grandeur (2023)

Singles from Dedicated 2 Disrespect
- 1. "Sick Bitch" Released: April 7, 2021; 2. "The Devil" Released: April 28, 2021

Dedicated 2 Disrespect is the third extended play by American musician LSDXOXO, released on May 14, 2021, under XL Recordings. With all tracks written and performed by Glasgow himself, it is the first LSDXOXO release that showcases his own songwriting and vocals, rather than through featured artists or music samples.

== Background and release ==
The release of Dedicated 2 Disrespect followed the release of Glasgow's first mixtape after a two-year hiatus, Waiting 2 Exhale (2020). In an interview with Mixmag, Glasgow stated that "The Devil" was the first track he wrote for the EP as a "more campy and playful" escape from the "intellectual and heavy" songwriting for his upcoming debut album, which would go on to define the rest of the EP as Glasgow continued work on it. The track "Sick Bitch" was distributed among club DJs before it was even announced for release, being played in several clubs and going viral on the internet before eventually being released as the lead single of Dedicated 2 Disrespect on April 7, 2021.

A second single "The Devil" was released on April 28, 2021, which Pitchfork likened to Lil Nas X's 2021 single Montero (Call Me by Your Name), naming it a "lacerating, irresistibly kink-positive techno". Paste Magazine said of the track "'The Devil' sets the tone for the highly anticipated project, oozing a raunchy, disheveled sexual euphoria found in packed clubs and raves". Two weeks later, on May 14, 2021, Dedicated 2 Disrespect was released on both LP and digital download, marking Glasgow's first ever work to see a physical release. It was released as a part of XL Recordings' "House Bag" series. It was met with positive reviews and has been categorized as techno-pop, Baltimore club, and deep house by various publications. Glasgow said of his newfound love of performing vocals on his own work: "I named the record Dedicated 2 Disrespect because I wanted to have this really vulgar sound that reflects who I am as an artist. It's not just shock value, it's who I am […] I'm making this record and my music in general to celebrate those parts in totality. It's just been such a process: being a Black man and also being a gay man and finding my voice, not just as an artist but as a person too. When I began making music, I was scared to be seen. Now I’m proud to be seen and heard."

On February 14, 2022, Glasgow released the single "SMD", based on and inspired by the Lil' Kim song "Suck My Dick" from her album The Notorious K.I.M., advertised as the lead single of Dedicated 2 Respect's official remix EP. One month later, on March 24, he released a new version of "Sick Bitch" remixed by VTSS, a Polish musician whom Glasgow had previously collaborated with on her 2021 single "Goin Nuts". This was the final single before Glasgow released Dedicated 2 Disrespect: The Remixes on March 25, 2022 under his own label Floorgasm, featuring six new remixes by electronic musicians Tygapaw, River Moon, Badsista, Anal House, D. Dan, and Estoc, as well as "SMD" and the VTSS remix of "Sick Bitch".

== Critical reception ==
Professional ratings
Review scores
Source	Rating
Pitchfork	7.5/10

Dedicated 2 Disrespect drew generally positive reviews from music critics and publications. Jesse Dorris of Pitchfork gave the EP a 7.5/10, writing "A foursome of queer bangers, the EP foregrounds his own voice for the first time, with a ribald poise that makes one wonder why it took him so long."

== Track listing ==
All tracks written and produced by LSDXOXO.

Dedicated 2 Disrespect track listing
No.	Title	Length
1.	"The Devil"	4:04
2.	"Baby"	4:05
3.	"Sick Bitch"	4:19
4.	"Mutant Exotic"	3:51
Total length:		16:21

Dedicated 2 Disrespect: The Remixes track listing
No.	Title	Length
1.	"SMD"	3:29
2.	"The Devil" (Tygapaw Remix)	4:05
3.	"Sick Bitch" (VTSS Remix)	4:19
4.	"Sick Bitch" (River Moon Remix)	3:51
5.	"Mutant Exotic" (D. Dan Remix)	6:14
6.	"Sick Bitch" (Anal House Remix)	4:23
7.	"Mutant Exotic" (Badsista Remix)	4:46
8.	"Baby" (Estoc Remix)	3:45
Total length:		36:48
