= Zebulon Cafe Concert =

Coordinates: 34°06′26.2″N 118°15′17.0″W

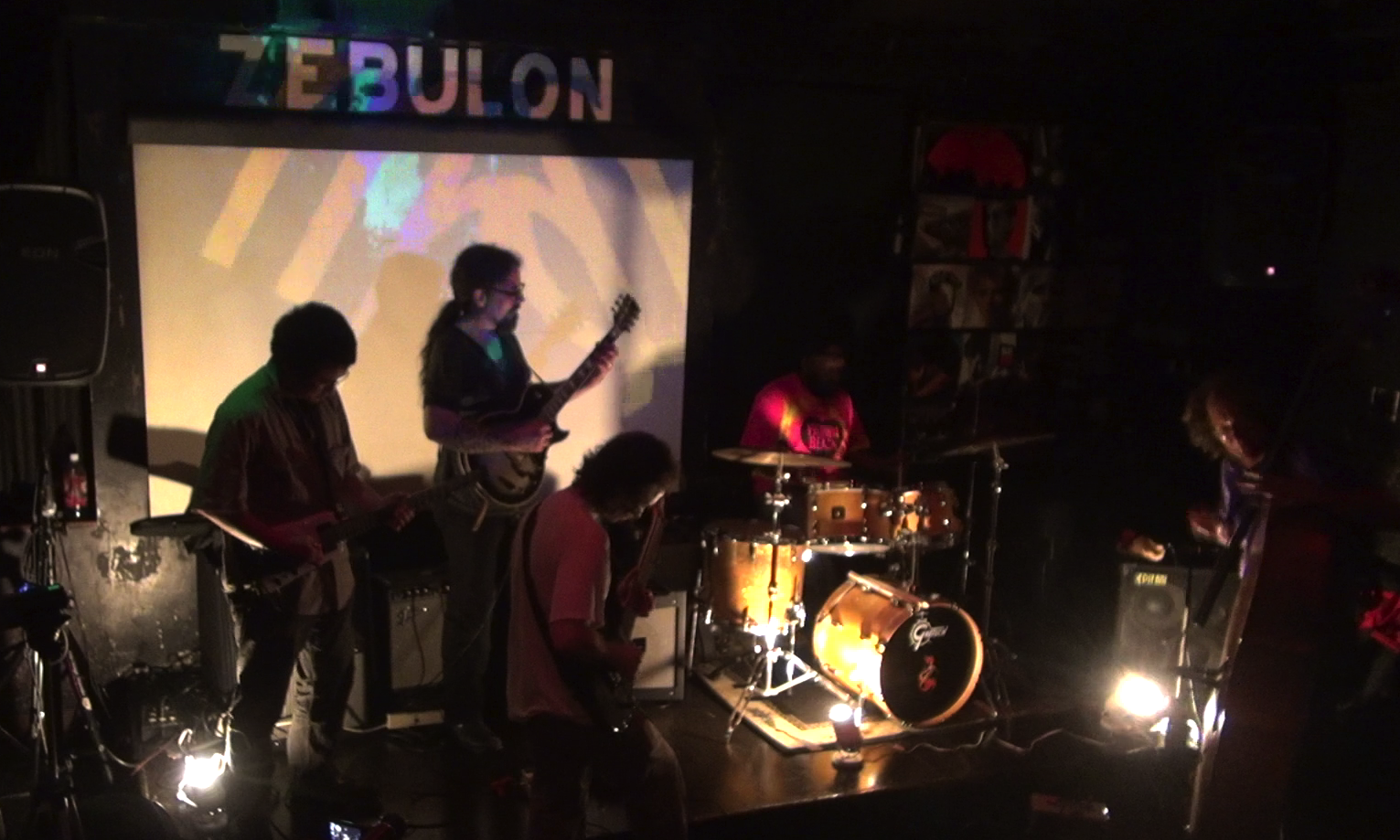
Marc Edwards Slipstream Time Travel at Zebulon's original Brooklyn location

Zebulon Café Concert, also known as Zebulon, is a music venue, bar, and restaurant located in Los Angeles, California. Zebulon was originally located in Brooklyn, New York, where it operated as a combined café/bar and hosted live music until closing in December 2012. It was named as a critic's pick by New York magazine. More than four years after its original closure, Zebulon reopened in a new space in Los Angeles' Frogtown neighborhood in 2017.

Owned by Guillaume Blestel and Joce and Jef Soubiran, Zebulon features nightly performances by local and international musicians and performers. Performances at the original Brooklyn location included Ravi Shankar and Melvin Van Peebles. Performances at the Los Angeles location have included artists such as Ty Segall, Kim Gordon, Blanck Mass, This Heat, Oh Sees, Black Midi, and Lingua Ignota.

== Non-music programming ==
Being owned by two natives of France, Zebulon has been noted as a hub for France emigrants and francophiles from all over LA. Zebulon frequently collaborates with the francophile movie screening club, La Collectionneuse, to host free screenings of French films. They encourage club members to congregate at the Zebulon for drinks and food before their events in costume. Sometimes the screenings are preluded with DJ's/musical acts in theme of the film.
