= Sexorcism (Brooke Candy album) =

Studio album by Brooke Candy
- Released: October 25, 2019
- Genre: Futurepop; house; trap
- Length: 33:27
- Label: Nuxxe
- Producer: Boys Noize; Andrew Goldstein; Oscar Scheller; Raf Riley; Carl Ryden; Sega Bodega

Brooke Candy chronology
Opulence (2014)	Sexorcism (2019)	Candyland (2024)

Singles from Sexorcism
- 1. "XXXTC" Released: July 2, 2019; 2. "Drip" Released: September 10, 2019; 3. "FMU" Released: October 21, 2019

Sexorcism (stylized in all caps) is the debut studio album by American rapper Brooke Candy. It was released on October 25, 2019 by Nuxxe. The album features guest appearances from Charli XCX, Iggy Azalea, Violet Chachki, Aquaria, Erika Jayne, Rico Nasty, Ashnikko, and others.

== Background ==
In February 2014, Candy signed with RCA Records. Candy's original debut album was set to be called Daddy Issues, being executively produced by then label-mate Sia, who was also a songwriter on the record. She discovered Candy on Instagram and reached out to her, believing that she was the only person who could really support Candy in becoming who she is on a grander stage or platform." From 2015 to 2017, some promotional and official singles were unveiled anticipating the album's release including "Rubber Band Stacks", "Happy Days", "Nasty", "Paper or Plastic", and "Living Out Loud featuring Sia, which ended up being the first Candy's charting song peaking at number 4 at the Billboard's US Dance Club Songs chart. RCA stated that the album was set for a spring 2017 release.

In the summer of 2017, Candy parted ways with RCA Records. In an interview, she stated that Sony owned the songs so after her departure the album was cancelled. During June, Candy spoke with magazine Bullett about her experience with RCA Records, stating: "I feel like I’ve been in a weird Matrix glitch for the past three or four years, but I’m finally out of it—back at square one, but way healthier." Candy also said she had begun planning an EP set to be released during the summer. "I’m working on a new EP that’s like punk-rap—it’s just what I’ve been feeling. I want to make music everyone can dance to. I never particularly wanted to make mainstream pop music—it just seemed like a great opportunity and a really cool way for me to build a fucking massive platform to spread a conscious, positive message to young girls and the queer community. But I think I have a better chance of doing that if I just stay true to what I’m good at—making raw and authentic rap music, and just being myself." From mid-2017 to early 2018 Candy returned to her career as an independent artist with self-released singles "Volcano" and "For Free".

Later she signed with independent record label WonderSound Records and released two singles with them; "War" intended as the lead single of a later scrapped EP tentatively titled Who Cares and "My Sex" featuring Pussy Riot, MNDR and Mykki Blanco

On November 7, 2018, Candy stated that releasing a first full-length album was still a possibility. "Because of my experience with Sony, I must have made like 60 songs and they just never let me put any of them out. I had a full album ready to go and that kind of burnt me a little bit and put a bad taste in my mouth. I questioned my music and my art for a while and just stopped making it completely," Candy explained. "I'll release the next couple of songs but I'm planning an album and it's in the works. I don't want to jump ahead and say things because if things don't happen like, godammit!" Before the end of the year two more singles were self-released; "Nuts" featuring American songwriter and rapper Lil Aaron and a joint single alongside production duo Ojivolta called "Oomph".

On January 10, 2019, Candy confirmed that she just had finished her debut album. She recorded it in London with English producer, singer and songwriter Oscar Scheller along with rapper Ashnikko. Candy spoke on her time alongside the pair: "Ashnikko is basically a savant! We agreed she would help with an EP if I helped with a music video, but we had three tracks done in a day… within four days we had twelve strong, cohesive songs!" On February 28, Candy confirmed the album title to be Sexorcism.

== Composition ==
The album has been described as "futuristic pop, house, and trap". Candy described the sound of the lead single "XXXTC" as "uber-sexual, freaky, weird and nonsensical!" During the same interview, she claimed to have worked with many other artists for the record; "I have basically all of my dream collaborators – there's Boys Noize, Rico Nasty and TOOPOOR". "Rim", a '90s house inspired track featuring RuPaul's Drag Race winners Aquaria and Violet Chachki, was also confirmed to be on the album. "I wanted to mimic Erotica, so it's us whispering the nastiest shit over this incredible bassline." Candy stated.

== Promotion ==
=== Singles ===
On February 28 announced that the first "unofficial" single would be called "Happy", which was released on March 29, 2019 along with its official music video directed by Rankin. The track lyrically deals with themes such as mental health and identity, with Paper stating that Candy "takes you through the motions of battling mental health and finding that there's pleasure in the pain." The track has also been described as "some of [Candy's] most personal work to date".

On June 20, 2019; Candy confirmed in an interview with The Face a collaboration with Charli XCX and rapper Maliibu Mitch called "XXXTC", which later served as the project's lead single. Its music video was unveiled on July 23 and was directed by Luke Abby and Dejan Jovanović.

The album's second single "Drip" featuring Erika Jayne was released on September 10, 2019 along its music video. It was directed by Candy along photographer Angelo Kritikos.

The third and final single from the proyect "FMU" featuring Rico Nasty was unveiled on October 21 accompanied by its self-directed music video. It premiered via The Fader the same day.

A music video for the song "Freak Like Me" featuring TOOPOOR was released on November 12, 2019. It was directed by Rony Alwin along Candy herself.

On December 4, 2019 Candy released a self-directed music video for the song "Nymph".

A remix of "Cum" by Scottish producer Sophie was uploaded to Candy's official YouTube on February 14, 2020. The music video for the original song, directed by Jovanović was released on December 23 and featured cameos by several celebrities as Paris Hilton, Shea Couleé and Amanda Lepore.

"Drip" was featured in the award-winning 2024 comedy-drama film Anora, released October 18, 2024.

=== Tour ===
Sexorcism Tour
- Tour by Brooke Candy
- Associated album: Sexorcism
- Start date: February 25, 2020
- End date: March 6, 2020
- Legs: 1
- No. of shows: 5 in Europe; 1 in Asia; 5 total
- Supporting acts: ELM; TekiLAtex; LoliZazou

Brooke Candy concert chronology
- The Whore Tour; The Sexorcism Tour; The Candyland Tour

Candy embarked on the Sexorcism Tour through Europe. The six-date event begun on February 25, 2020 in Berlin and ended in Tokyo on March 6, 2020.

List of concerts, showing date, city, country, venue, and opening act
Date	City	Country	Venue	Opening act
February 25, 2020	Berlin	Germany	Berghain	ELM
February 26, 2020	Amsterdam	Netherlands	3x NYX	ELM
February 27, 2020	Paris	France	La Boule Noire	ELM
February 28, 2020	Barcelona	Spain	Sala Apolo	TekiLAtex; Loli Zazou
February 29, 2020	London	United Kingdom	Studio 9294	TekiLAtex; Loli Zazou
March 6, 2020	Tokyo	Japan	Daikanayama UNIT	TekiLAtex; Loli Zazou

== Critical reception ==
Professional ratings
Aggregate scores
Source	Rating
Metacritic	55/100
Review scores
Source	Rating
Clash	4/10
Crack	7/10 stars
DIY	3/5 stars
PopMatters	6/10 stars
Slant Magazine	2.5/5 stars

Reviews from professional critics were mixed, primarily criticizing the one-dimensionality of the album's lyrical content. DIY appreciated the album's purpose of "reclaiming female sexuality without any major-label censoring", but found the record to be "incredibly empowering and progressive" only in little doses while "clumsy in its own damp puddle" when listened to from start to finish. Clash did praise some of the guest verses, particularly those of Charli XCX and Rico Nasty, but found the album to be "lacking in ideas" overall.

However, Washington Blade praised Sexorcism's little depth, suggesting that it was poking fun at "music merely pretending to have soul". A PopMatters critic also enjoyed Sexorcism, opining that while it was not very accessible, "it does stand as the second coming of Brooke Candy -- in all of her nightmarish but playful, horned-up but at least honest, seedy and sexy glory."

== Track listing ==
All tracks produced by Scheller, except where noted.

Sexorcism track listing
No.	Title	Writer(s)	Producer(s)	Length
1.	"Nymph"	Brooke Candy; Chloe Black	Carl Ryden	2:00
2.	"XXXTC" (featuring Charli XCX and Maliibu Miitch)	Candy; Oscar Scheller; Ashnikko; Maliibu Miitch; Charli XCX		3:18
3.	"R.I.P." (featuring Ashnikko)	Candy; Scheller; Ashnikko		3:30
4.	"Cum" (featuring Iggy Azalea)	Candy; Iggy Azalea; Ashnikko; Scheller		2:37
5.	"Rim" (featuring Violet Chachki and Aquaria)	Candy; Jesse Saint John; Scheller		3:24
6.	"Swing" (featuring Bree Runway)	Candy; Ashnikko; Bree Runway; Scheller		2:42
7.	"Encore" (featuring La Goony Chonga)	Candy; Ashnikko; La Goony Chonga; Scheller		1:46
8.	"Freak Like Me" (featuring Toopoor)	Candy; Jesse Saint John; Toopoor	Andrew Goldstein	2:50
9.	"Boss Bitch" (featuring Ashnikko)	Candy; Scheller; Ashnikko		2:28
10.	"Drip" (featuring Erika Jayne)	Candy; Scheller; Ashnikko; Salvador Navarrete; Jesse Saint John	Sega Bodega; Scheller; Raf Riley	2:13
11.	"Honey Pussy"	Candy; Scheller; Ashnikko		3:30
12.	"FMU" (featuring Rico Nasty)	Candy; Maria-Cecilia Simone Kelly; Jesse Saint John	Boys Noize	2:58
Total length:				33:27

Sample credits

- "FMU" samples the song "I Sit on Acid" by Lords of Acid from their 1991 album Lust.
