= Paper or Plastic (song) =

Single by Brooke Candy
- Released: June 8, 2016
- Genre: Pop
- Length: 2:55
- Label: RCA
- Songwriters: Josh Cumbee; Shari Short; Afshin Salmani
- Producer: NONFICTION

Brooke Candy singles chronology
"Nasty" (2016)	"Paper or Plastic" (2016)	"Living Out Loud" (2017)

"Paper or Plastic" is a song recorded by American singer Brooke Candy. It was written by Josh Cumbee, Shari Short, and Afshin Salmani, and produced by NONFICTION for Candy's unreleased album Daddy Issues. It was released as the fifth promotional single from the record. In 2017, Candy left RCA to focus on releasing a second extended play (EP), and the release of Daddy Issues was cancelled.

Moving away from her past rap sound from her 2014 EP Opulence, the track is a mid-tempo pop song revolving around issues relating to commercialism, superficiality, and capitalism. In the lyrics, Candy sings about how women must abandon their innocence to get an independent life. Critical response to "Paper or Plastic" was mixed; some music critics praised the sound while another criticized it alongside the other promotional singles for the album.

Darren Craig directed the song's music video, which Candy envisioned as a satire on political and socioeconomic repression of women and misogyny. In the video, Candy appears with a group of oppressed women who rise up against a tyrannical man and shoot him with golden rifles. The visual attracted critical attention from media commentators, who discussed the possible inspirations for the women and the setting. Critics positively responded to the music video, complimenting it as vibrant and outrageous.

== Background and release ==
"Paper or Plastic" was written by Josh Cumbee, Shari Short, and Afshin "AFSHeeN" Salmani, and produced by Cumbee and Salmani under their production team alias NONFICTION. Mark "Exit" Goodchild served as the mixing engineer, and the programmers and recording engineers were Cumbee and Salmani. Cumbee played the guitar for the track, while the keyboard was provided by Cumbee and Salmani.

The song was made available on June 8, 2016, by RCA as a digital download. While "Paper or Plastic" was released to promote Brooke Candy's unreleased album Daddy Issues, the 2017 follow-up song "Living Out Loud" was chosen as the project's lead single. In 2017, the release for Daddy Issues was canceled after Candy left RCA to record an extended play (EP) that returned to her original punk-inspired rap sound. In an interview with Noisey, she clarified: "Sony and I parted ways – I made an entire album with them, but technically they own that music".

== Music and lyrics ==
"Paper or Plastic"
The instrumental of the song features electronics and a pop melody, which is a departure from Candy's previous rap sound on her 2014 EP Opulence.

"Paper or Plastic" is a two-minute, fifty-five second pop song, which features a "mid-tempo groove". Unlike her previous material from her 2014 EP Opulence, Candy does not rap during the song and instead sings the verses. Mike Wass of Idolator felt that Candy was making a conscious move away from "the twisted white-girl rap" present in her past songs "Opulence" and "I Wanna Fuck Right Now". Wass also called the track "unusually restrained" for the artist. According to Nylon's Yasmeen Gharnit, "Paper or Plastic" revolves around issues relating to "commercialism, superficiality, and selling out". A writer from Hungertv.com viewed the song as focusing on "the capitalist agenda and societal exclusion". When responding to criticism regarding her change in musical style, Candy said: "[W]hatever I have to do [to] garner a larger, broader audience to spread my message on a larger scale, I stand for women, I stand for freedom. For love and self-preservation."

The instrumental features a "pop melody and fizzing electronics" while Candy sings the lyrics: "Time keeps on wasting, but I'm too high to be wasting with all this yolo and rap shit, my heart is elastic". Noisey's Daisy Jones interpreted the words as a reference to Australian singer Sia's 2013 single "Elastic Heart", who served as the executive producer of Daddy Issues. The song continues with the lyrics: "Living for the days, living for the nights, living for the chance to give what's right, now tell me who the hell you think I am." During the song's hook, Candy sings "Why do all the good girls have to die/ Living in a bad girl's paradise"; Yasmeen Gharnit wrote that the section discusses how women must discard their innocence to achieve independence. Other parts include: "Go buy a life that's fantastic cause all you are is your assets” and "You can't buy love without passion / So please don't do nothing drastic".

== Critical reception ==
Critical response to "Paper or Plastic" was mixed. Daisy Jones praised the song as a "pure shot of sparkling pop", describing it as "sweet, poppy and hella catchy". Zarah Cheng of Hypebae praised Candy's vocals as "soothingly wispy", calling the song a "sultry track filled with a throbbing dream beat and slowly paced synth notes". While Wass initially responded positively to the track as showcasing Candy's versatility as an artist, he was more critical of it during his review of the follow-up single "Living Out Loud", including it in his list of the "string of flops" released to promote Daddy Issues. He also described the tracks released from the cancelled project as "a string of basic bangers", and negatively compared it to Candy's 2017 single "Volcano".

== Music video ==
=== Background and synopsis ===
A music video, directed by Darren Craig, was released on July 15, 2016. Prior to the release, Candy uploaded a preview of the visual to her official Instagram account. It was originally scheduled to be released earlier, but was delayed due to incidents of gun violence in the United States; Candy attributed the delay to her desire to avoid censoring the video. She said that she took two years to fully develop the concept behind the visual, explaining that she created it as a "satire on oppression and the current state of the world". Yasmeen Gharnit interpreted the video as Candy taking a stance against the patriarchy. Echoing Gharnit's sentiments, a writer for Ranconteur.la wrote that it was a "story of patriarchal oppression with stylistic innovation and panache". According to Candy:

It’s a direct response to the current tyrannical and oppressive political, economic, and social climate we live in… Living in a hostile, misogynist environment requires women with good intentions to fire back and leave any idealism from their girlhood behind.

— Brooke Candy, Ranconteur.la

In the video, Candy is shown living with a cult on a farm populated by abused women and a tyrannical man. Candy and the other women are seen performing various chores around the house. The man demands that the women prepare dinner, and drags one of them outside by her hair. These opening sequences are accompanied by the sounds of a piano, the women's cooking knives, and the man's ax. The women seek vengeance against the man, removing all of their clothing, confronting him while he is chopping wood, and shooting him with golden rifles. The visual also includes scenes of Candy posing with a white horse while wearing oversized hats and holding decorated machine guns.

=== Analysis and reception ===
The visual attracted critical analysis from media commentators. A writer from Promonews.tv interpreted the characters as representing a Mormon or Mennonite group. A writer for Ranconteur.la found the setting to be reminiscent of that from the 1972 film Deliverance. Mimi Davies wrote the core theme for the song and its video was "[t]hat being fabulous is not synonymous with equality" and a woman is still controlled by the patriarchy even if she can purchase objects for herself.

The video received a positive response from critics following its release. Rachel Sonis of Idolator wrote that the video was "just as fantastic and strange you’d expect". Candy was described as performing "Sister Wife realness" in the visual by NewNowNext's Adam Salandra, who praised it as being as "visually mesmerizing as you might expect". Mike Wass commended the video as being Candy's "her most outrageous yet", highlighting the fashion and the singer's "passion for outrageous visuals". A writer from Promonews.tv found the visual to a "creative new take" on Western fashion, pop music videos, and nudity, comparing it to the work of American film director Russ Meyer. Mimi Davies called the video a "raw, disturbing depiction of sister-wives taking revenge on their male oppressor".

== Track listings ==
Digital download
No.	Title	Length
1.	"Paper or Plastic"	2:55

== Credits ==
- Songwriting – Josh Cumbee, Shari Short, and Afshin "AFSHeeN" Salmani
- Production – NONFICTION
- Keyboard – Josh Cumbee and Afshin "AFSHeeN" Salmani
- Guitar – Josh Cumbee
- Mixing engineer – Mark "Exit" Goodchild
- Programming – Josh Cumbee and Afshin "AFSheeN" Salmani
- Recording engineer – Josh Cumbee and Afshin "AFSheeN" Salmani

== Release history ==
Region	Format	Date	Label
Worldwide	Digital download	July 8, 2016	RCA
