= Cain Culto =

American singer and musician

- Born: Andrew Estevan Padilla; Florida, U.S.
- Origin: Lexington, Kentucky
- Genres: Pop; Hip-Hop; Indie
- Occupations: singer-songwriter rapper violinist
- Instruments: vocals violin
- Years active: 2021–present
- Website: cainculto.com

Andrew Estevan Padilla, known by his stage name Cain Culto, is an American singer and violinist. Cain Culto "refers back to his upbringing - the Biblical nod of 'Cain' hard to miss, and 'Culto' the Spanish word for worship." As the Biblical Cain is "an outcast of sorts. But rather than accept that story’s tragic conclusion, he saw [creating the moniker] Cain Culto as an opportunity to reclaim it."

== Early life and education ==
Culto was born in Florida and grew up in Lexington, Kentucky. He is of Colombian and Nicaraguan descent. "'We were the only Latino family,' he remembers of his Kentucky neighborhood. 'There was an othering experience in my young adult life and probably a lot of shame in being Latino.'"

He attended the School of Creative and Performing Arts, where he majored in visual arts but also studied music, theatre, and dance.

== Career ==
Culto was an Evangelical worship leader and a founding member of a Christian band called Ecclesia. He often led worship and learned how to “feel a room and guide a room into some transcendent experience.”

His music is inspired by Appalachian and Colombian music, specifically Bluegrass, Vallenato and Bullerengue. He blends political lyrics with drums and violin and, as a visual artist, creates music videos and performances with imagery of queerness, mythology, and witchcraft.

In 2024, he released his first EP, titled O ω O.

In 2025, he released the singles "KFC Santería" and "Kali Maa". His second EP, occulto 001, was launched on October 31, followed by the release of the single "¡Basta Ya!", a collaboration with the activist-musician Xiuhtezcatl.

On July 10, 2026, he released the EP "occulto 002." The music video for "BIMBAMBAU" highlights Culto's genre-breaking music and commitment to celebrating body diversity. "cucuru" takes a different approach, setting the music video in a homoerotic lucha libre context.

== Personal life ==
Culto left the Christian faith after coming out as gay. He lives in Los Angeles, California.
