= Living Out Loud (song) =

Single by Brooke Candy featuring Sia
- Released: February 3, 2017
- Recorded: 2014
- Genre: Power-pop
- Length: 4:21
- Label: RCA
- Songwriters: Geoffrey Early; Sia Furler; Greg Kurstin; Priscilla Hamilton
- Producer: Jesse Shatkin

Brooke Candy singles chronology
"Paper or Plastic" (2016)	"Living Out Loud" (2017)	"Volcano" (2017)

Sia singles chronology
"Move Your Body" (2017)	"Living Out Loud" (2017)	"Waterfall" (2017)

Music video
- "Living Out Loud" on YouTube

"Living Out Loud" is a song by American singer Brooke Candy featuring Australian singer Sia, released on February 3, 2017. The song was set to be the lead single from Candy's unreleased studio album, Daddy Issues. The KDA remix version of the track was released on December 16, 2016, while the original and proper single version of the track was made available for download and streaming on February 3, 2017.

== Background and composition ==
Candy recorded the song in 2014. She told about working with songwriter and featured artist Sia: "To work with, Sia is very precise, very fast, and very cerebral. Watching her do something is like watching a real artist work. She doesn't overthink anything, it's stream of consciousness, and that's really inspiring. She's definitely one of the women in pop music that's at the forefront of re-adjusting some things and changing the landscape."

About the creative process and the song's creation, Candy also stated: "Sia took the reins writing it over two and a half years ago, and I recorded it then. We’ve mixed and remixed it, and we waited for the right moment [to release it]. I like the sonic composition of it, and it’s interesting having me and Sia sing back and forth to each other. At the time I was getting sober, thinking about changing my lifestyle, finding happiness… So it resonated with me because I was looking for that."

Bradley Stern of PopCrush noted the song as an exploration of pop music for Candy, which differed from her typical rapping. Nylon stated that the production of the song consists on "sugary pop synths" and "danceable club beats" while Justin Moran from Out described it as "power-pop". Lyrically, "Living Out Loud" uses a countdown form, and discusses substance abuse.

In an interview with magazine Bullett, Candy told about the song: ""Living Out Loud" was a big part of me when I made it—it's such a good song and I love performing it. But now I'm just focused on raw, gritty, back to basics righteous rap music."

== Critical reception ==
Wonderland described "Living Out Loud" as "fearlessly creative", and "infectiously upbeat and uplifting". Bradley Stern from PopCrush noted Candy's change of direction musically, and gave the song a positive review, saying, "what’s wrong with exploring new territory anyway? She’s just living out loud — after all, it’s the only way she knows how". Justin Moran of Out considered the song to be "Candy's first opportunity to break into mainstream music." In contrast, Mike Wass from Idolator made a negative review of the song comparing it with elevator music and called it "[a] cheesy pop anthem" stating that it was "really bad".

== Music video ==
The song's official music video was released on March 27, 2017. It was directed by Simon Cahn and produced by Sarah Park. The video features Candy, as well as a group of people dressing confidently in high-necked, white lace gowns and wearing low-top sneakers. Candy appears crawling around on the ground and riding a motorcycle while performing "wheelies". Sia's persona is represented via backup dancers wearing ivory corsets and her trademark black-and-blond wig. The video has been described as "empowering" and "inclusive". Candy has been noted to show a softer presentation of herself, in comparison to her prior work, as well as resembling of Madonna in her early career.

== Track listings ==
Digital download
No.	Title	Length
1.	"Living Out Loud"	4:21

KDA Remix
No.	Title	Length
1.	"Living Out Loud" (KDA Remix)	3:41

The Remixes, Vol. 1
No.	Title	Length
1.	"Living Out Loud" (Oskar Flood Remix)	3:46
2.	"Living Out Loud" (Madison Mars Remix)	4:10
3.	"Living Out Loud" (John "J-C" Carr Remix)	3:20
Total length:		11:17

The Remixes, Vol. 2
No.	Title	Length
1.	"Living Out Loud" (NOTD Remix)	3:23
2.	"Living Out Loud" (Yall Remix)	3:23
3.	"Living Out Loud" (KDA Extended Mix)	6:17
Total length:		13:04

== Personnel ==
Taken from digital download liner notes.

- Jesse Shatkin – bass, engineer, keyboards, producer, programmer,
- Geoffrey Earley – composer, lyricist
- Sia Furler – composer, lyricist, vocals
- Priscilla Hamilton – composer, lyricist
- Greg Kurstin – composer, lyricist, piano, recording engineer
- Chris Galland – engineer
- Sam Spiegel – engineer
- Robin Florent – assistant engineer
- Jeff Jackson – assistant engineer
- Bernie Grundman – masterer
- Manny Marroquin – mixer
- Peter Mokran – mixer
- Kuk Harrell – recording engineer, vocal producer
- Rob Kleiner – recording engineer
- Brooke Candy – vocals

== Charts ==
Chart (2017–18)	Peak position
Croatia Airplay (HRT)	47
US Dance Club Songs (Billboard)	4

== Release history ==
Region	Date	Format	Label	Ref.
Worldwide	December 16, 2016 (KDA Remix)	Digital download; streaming	RCA	
Worldwide	February 3, 2017	Digital download; streaming	RCA	
Worldwide	February 17, 2017 (The Remixes, Vol. 1)	Digital download; streaming	RCA	
Worldwide	March 3, 2017 (The Remixes, Vol. 2)	Digital download; streaming	RCA	
