= Opulence (EP) =

EP by Brooke Candy
- Released: May 6, 2014
- Recorded: 2013–14
- Length: 14:58
- Label: RCA
- Producer: A.C.; Cory Enemy; Diplo; Kool Kojak; Jesse Shatkin; Shea Taylor; Swizzymack

Brooke Candy chronology
| The Mixtape (2013) | Opulence (2014) | Sexorcism (2019) |

Singles from Opulence
- 1. "Opulence" Released: April 22, 2014

Opulence is the debut extended play (EP) by American rapper Brooke Candy, released as digital download by RCA Records on May 6, 2014. The EP is preceded by the release of title track and lead single "Opulence" and is Candy's first major label release. The EP features production from Diplo, Kool Kojak, Jesse Shatkin and Shea Taylor among others, including a feature with producer Cory Enemy and songwriting work from Mozella, Jesse Saint John and Sia, the latter also serving as executive producer of the project.

== Background and promotion ==
Candy caught Sia's attention, and she contacted her via Instagram with the purpose of writing one song for her. Sia ended up executive producing Candy's debut record, helping her to get a record contract and to find, in Sia's words: "[a] decent, nice, honest management, and [to] help [her] make the art [she] want[s] to make from a place of positive mental health and love". Candy signed with RCA in February 2014. She later joined Columbia's UK roster. The first single and title track was performed on April 3, 2014, at Nicola Formichetti's debut Diesel fashion show in Venice. It was later released on April 22, 2014, as a digital download along the premiere of its official music video directed by Steven Klein and styled by Formichetti. The song is featured in a scene of CSI's fifteen season episode "Under My Skin" and is part of the soundtrack of the basketball video game NBA Live 15.

== Critical reception ==
The EP was generally praised by critics. Kevin Apaza from Direct Lyrics said "five songs featuring hard-hitting synths, fierce and risqué lyrics, and a swagger by Brooke that can't be duplicated. She's making us excited about female rappers again. There just have to be more options than Nicki or Iggy!". Ashley Emma NG from Best Fan also praised the project, saying "Opulence brings a fresh sound that is all Brook[e] Candy. Some may not understand her lascivious and unconventional attitude, but you can't help but respect her hustle. Her confidence is indestructible, and not once does it come off as cocky."

== Track listing ==
Credits taken from Qobuz.

| No. | Title | Writer(s) | Producer(s) | Length |
|---|---|---|---|---|
| 1. | "Opulence" | Noah Beresin; Brooke Candy; Sia Furler; Thomas Pentz; Jordan Safford; Jesse Saint John | Diplo; Swizzymack^{[a]} | 2:19 |
| 2. | "Pop Rock" | Furler; Robert Shea Taylor | Shea Taylor | 2:56 |
| 3. | "Bed Squeak" | Candy; Alexander Castillo Vasquez; Allan P. Grigg; Saint John | A.C.; Kool Kojak | 3:40 |
| 4. | "Feel Yourself (Alcohol)" (featuring Cory Enemy) | Candy; Michel Sanchez; Patrice Delacour; Cory Nitta; Saint John | Cory Enemy | 3:46 |
| 5. | "Godzillionaire" | Candy; Furler; Jimmy Joliff; MoZella; Nitta; Jesse Shatkin; Saint John | Shatkin | 2:55 |
| Total length: | | | | 14:58 |

Notes

- ^{^[a]} signifies a co-producer

Sampling credits

- "Feel Yourself (Alcohol)" samples the 1997 song entitled "Alane" recorded by Wes.

== Charts ==
| Chart (2014) | Peak position |
|---|---|
| US Top R&B/Hip-Hop Albums (Billboard) | 48 |
