= Jesse Saint John =

American songwriter and singer (born 1989)

- Born: Jesse St. John Geller; October 5, 1989 (age 36)
- Origin: California, United States
- Genre: Pop
- Occupations: Singer; songwriter

Jesse St. John Geller (born October 5, 1989) is an American songwriter and singer. St. John has written for a number of artists, most notably Britney Spears, Kim Petras, Dorian Electra, Charli XCX, Brooke Candy, and The Neighbourhood, among others. He released his debut EP, Don't Stop Dancing. Life Gets Sad, in May 2019. Saint John co-wrote the Billboard number-one single, "Truth Hurts", by Lizzo.

== Early life ==
St. John grew up in Orange County, California, and attended a conservatory art school there.

== Career ==
Jesse Saint John began his career in songwriting writing for Brooke Candy, a personal friend. After a while, he started doing sessions with producers and other writers and ended up turning it into a career. He has also worked with artists such as Britney Spears, Camila Cabello, Lauv, the band The Neighbourhood, Charli XCX and Aquaria.

In February 2018, he released his first single, "Move", followed by a second single in May 2018 titled, "Fake It". He also signed on to perform at the LA Pride event in June 2018. In 2019, a song Saint John wrote with Lizzo in 2017 titled "Truth Hurts" gained popularity, eventually topping the Billboard Hot 100. According to Billboard, "Truth Hurts" is officially the longest-running Billboard Hot 100 No. 1 by a solo female rapper. In 2020, he wrote an English version of the song "Voice" (목소리; Moksori) by Loona, called "Star". It was released as a music video through YouTube on November 17, 2020.

In April 2025, he started the process of co-writing the music for Retrograde The Musical alongside Nick Laughlin, Richard C. Walter, and Drew Louis. He collaborated with Drew Louis and Bonnie McKee on the release of "Libra (Fairest of Them All)".

== Discography ==
=== Extended plays ===
Title	Details
Don't Stop Dancing. Life Gets Sad	Released: May 9, 2019; Label: Self-released; Formats: Digital download, streaming

=== Singles ===
As lead artist
Title	Year	Album
"Move"	2018	Non-album singles
"Fake It"	2018	Non-album singles
"What Do U Like"	2018	Don't Stop Dancing. Life Gets Sad

As featured artist
Title	Year	Album
"Banjee Power (Blok Remix)" (AB Soto featuring Jesse Saint John)	2011	F*g Out, Vol. 1
"Love It When You Love Me" (with Ieuan)	2018	Over the Garden Wall

=== Appearances ===
Guest appearances
Title	Year	Artist	Album	Notes	Ref.
"Bomb"	2018	Big Freedia	3rd Ward Bounce	Uncredited vocals	
"Got My Number"	2019	Kim Petras	Clarity	Uncredited vocals	

=== Songwriting credits ===
Title	Year	Artist(s)	Album	Ref.
"Das Me"	2012	Brooke Candy	Non-album single	
"Opulence"	2014	Brooke Candy	Opulence	
"Bed Squeak"	2014	Brooke Candy	Opulence	
"Free Yourself (Alcohol)"	2014	Brooke Candy	Opulence	
"Rubber Band Stacks"	2015	Brooke Candy	Non-album single	
"Only a Girl"	2015	Gia	Non-album single	
"Changes"	2016	Brooke Candy	Non-album single	
"Secret (Shh)"	2016	Charli XCX	Vroom Vroom	
"Love Me Down"	2016	Britney Spears	Glory	
"What I Like"	2016	Gia	Non-album single	
"Freedom" (featuring Jussie Smollett)	2016	Empire Cast	Empire: Original Soundtrack Season 2 Volume 2	
"Crown" (featuring Jamila Velazquez, Raquel Castro, and Yanira Marin)	2016	Empire Cast	Empire: Original Soundtrack Season 2 Volume 2	
"Body Speak" (featuring Serayah)	2016	Empire Cast	Empire: Original Soundtrack Season 2 Volume 2	
"Heart Won't Forget"	2016	Matoma; Gia	Non-album single	
"W Face"	2017	Koda Kumi	W Face ~Outside~	
"Thankful"	2017	New Kids on the Block	Thankful	
"Volcano"	2017	Brooke Candy	Non-album single	
"Truth Hurts"	2017	Lizzo	Cuz I Love You (Deluxe)	
"Freeze"	2017	Andy Grammer	The Good Parts	
"Xxpen$ive"	2017	Erika Jayne	N/A	
"Something's Gotta Give"	2018	Camila Cabello	Camila	
"Tightrope"	2018	LPX	Bolt in the Blue	
"Could U Love Me"	2018	Liz	Non-album single	
"Super Duper Nova"	2018	Liz	Non-album single	
"Pandemonium"	2018	Liz	Non-album single	
"Blue"	2018	The Neighbourhood	The Neighbourhood	
"Heaven"	2018	The Neighbourhood	The Neighbourhood	
"Dust"	2018	The Neighbourhood	The Neighbourhood	
"For Free"	2018	Brooke Candy	Non-album single	
"War"	2018	Brooke Candy	War	
"Look Back"	2018	Betty Who	Betty, Pt. 1	
"Easy Love"	2018	Lauv	I Met You When I Was 18. (The Playlist)	
"Paranoid"	2018	Lauv	I Met You When I Was 18. (The Playlist)	
"Bomb"	2018	Big Freedia	Third Ward Bounce	
"Your Side of the Bed"	2018	Loote	Your Side of the Bed (EP)	
"I Bet"	2018	Charlotte Lawrence	Young	
"Burn Rubber"	2018	Aquaria	Non-album single	
"Close Your Eyes"	2018	Kim Petras	Turn Off The Light, Vol. 1	
"Turn Off The Light (featuring Elvira, Mistress of the Dark)	2018	Kim Petras	Turn Off The Light, Vol. 1	
"Tell Me It's A Nightmare"	2018	Kim Petras	Turn Off The Light, Vol. 1	
"In The Next Life"	2018	Kim Petras	Turn Off The Light, Vol. 1	
"Mr. to You"	2019	Dorian Electra	Flamboyant	
"There Will Be Blood"	2019	Kim Petras	Turn Off The Light	
"Wrong Turn"	2019	Kim Petras	Turn Off The Light	
"Massacre"	2019	Kim Petras	Turn Off The Light	
"Everybody Dies"	2019	Kim Petras	Turn Off The Light	
"목소리 (Voice)"	2020	Loona	12:00	
"Verse"	2024	Chrissy Chlapecka	Girlie Pop	
"Diamonds"	2024	Kylie Minogue	Tension II	
"Dance to the Music"	2024	Kylie Minogue	Tension II	
“Aries (Dazzled)” (featuring Dylan Mulvaney)	2025	Retrograde The Musical	Retrograde The Musical (Studio Cast Recording)	
"Taurus (Dope)" (featuring John Pinto Jr.)	2025	Retrograde The Musical	Retrograde The Musical (Studio Cast Recording)	
"boom"	2025	Bbno$	Non-album single	
”Cancer (Boo Hoo)” (featuring Matt Rogers)	2025	Retrograde The Musical	Retrograde The Musical (Studio Cast Recording)	
”Leo (PartyStar)” (featuring Vincint)	2025	Retrograde The Musical	Retrograde The Musical (Studio Cast Recording)	
”Virgo (Lists & Receipts)" (featuring Liisi LaFontaine & Apocalypse Noir)	2025	Retrograde The Musical	Retrograde The Musical (Studio Cast Recording)	
”Libra (Fairest of Them All)" (featuring Bonnie McKee)	2025	Retrograde The Musical	Retrograde The Musical (Studio Cast Recording)	
”Scorpio (Death Stare)" (featuring Zane Phillips)	2025	Retrograde The Musical	Retrograde The Musical (Studio Cast Recording)	
”Sagittarius (Shoot Your Shot)" (featuring Lorna Courtney)	2025	Retrograde The Musical	Retrograde The Musical (Studio Cast Recording)	
”Capricorn (Gravity)" (featuring Paolo Montalban)	2026	Retrograde The Musical	Retrograde The Musical (Studio Cast Recording)	
"More"	2026	Illit	Break Even	

== Awards and nominations ==
Year	Nominee / work	Award	Result
2020	"Truth Hurts" (as a songwriter)	Grammy Award for Song of the Year	Nominated
