= Sega Bodega =

Irish-Scottish musician and producer

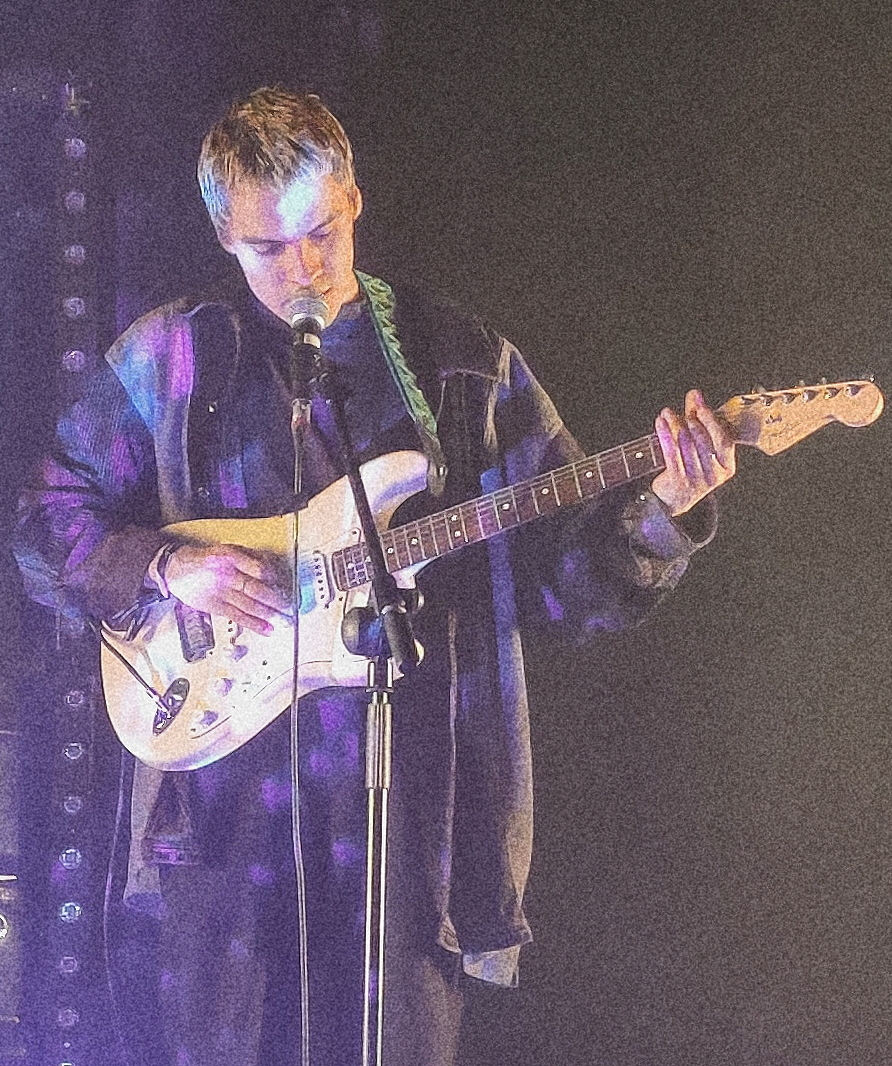
- Bodega in 2019

Background information
- Born: Salvador Navarrete; 16 February 1992 (age 34); Galway, Ireland
- Genres: Electronic; club; UK bass; deconstructed club; experimental; trip hop
- Occupations: Music producer; singer; songwriter; DJ; record executive
- Instruments: Vocals; electric guitar
- Years active: 2013–present
- Labels: ambient tweets; Nuxxe; Crazylegs; Activia Benz; Week of Wonders
- Member of: Kiss Facility

Salvador Navarrete (born 16 February 1992), better known by his stage name Sega Bodega, is an Irish-Chilean music producer, singer, songwriter, DJ, and co-head/founder of the record label and collective Nuxxe. Sega Bodega is known for his futuristic, bass-heavy and leftfield take on electronic and club music, fusing various elements of UK bass and hip-hop music, deconstructed club, and trip hop music into his songs. He rose to prominence producing tracks for London-based rapper, co-founder of the Nuxxe label, and close collaborator Shygirl, gaining attention from the likes of Rihanna, using various Nuxxe tracks for her Fenty Beauty commercials and fashion shows. Sega Bodega released various EPs before releasing his debut album, Salvador, in 2020, and his second album, Romeo, in 2021.

== Early life ==
Salvador Navarrete was born on 16 February 1992, in Galway, Ireland to a Chilean father and an Irish mother. He lived in Ireland until he was 10 when he relocated to Glasgow.

He had ambitions of being a producer since 2008, playing in various bands until he could understand how to use DAWs.

Initially, from about 2010, Navarrete operated under the moniker Peace but retired it when the indie rock band of the same name began rising to fame. He would later settle on his Sega Bodega moniker in 2012.

== Career ==
=== 2012–2015: Early beginnings ===
Navarrete first began gaining traction through various remixes, from which he gained widespread attention, and DJ gigs, supporting Lil B in Glasgow and playing the London Field Day festival in 2012.

In February 2013, Navarrete released his debut EP Song Dynasty, a collection of tracks recorded as far back as 2010, but refined and polished after developing a better understanding of the technicalities to music production. The EP was released via the London-based label, Week of Wonders. This was followed by his 34 EP, released in May 2013, also via the Week of Wonders label.

In May 2014, Navarrete was a part of the lineup for BBC Radio 1’s Big Weekend festival, where he played his re-released single "Stay Nervous", and "Maryland", which would later appear on his 2018 EP self*care, among other tracks. He also relocated to London in 2014.

After taking a hiatus from releases, Navarrete returned with the October 2015 release of the first SS project, containing reimagined and 'alternative' takes on cult film scores, such as A Clockwork Orange, Eraserhead, Akira and Boyz n the Hood, among others. The project was self-released. This was followed shortly after by the Sportswear EP, released via the Activia Benz label.

=== 2016–2018: Nuxxe, Ess B, early collaborations and self*care ===
In June 2016, London rapper Shygirl released her debut single, "Want More", produced by Navarrete. The single marked the first release of collective and label Nuxxe, co-founded by Navarrete, Shygirl, and French producer and performer Coucou Chloe, formed from a desire to create music and art with an easy-going, free-flowing, and fun attitude, separate from other pre-establishing labels, and to introduce a sound that no one had heard before to the world. The single would also appear in a Fenty Beauty commercial later in 2019. The release of "Want More" was followed by a collaborative single in October 2016 from Navarrete and Coucou Chloe titled "SPIT INTENT", under the moniker Y1640.

February 2017 marked a further collaboration with the single "CC", featuring Shygirl. The track was the lead single from Navarrete's next EP, titled Ess B, released later that month via the Crazylegs label, followed by one other Crazylegs release: the "Nivea" double single in July. More Nuxxe releases continued shortly after Ess B's release, such as another Y1640 single in March, titled "WEEP", Shygirl's double single "MSRYNVR" in May, and Coucou Chloe's EP Erika Jane in September, on which Navarrete is featured. In October, Navarrete released a second installation of the cinema-inspired project, SS, featuring more reimagined takes on film scores such as Requiem for a Dream (this track also features Shygirl on vocals), Alien and Ghost in the Shell, among others.

March 2018 marked the first release from French singer and producer Oklou on the Nuxxe label: her EP The Rite of May, on which Navarrete contributed co-production on the final track, "Friendless". Navarrete also released a piano version of the song later in the year. The two would continue to collaborate further down the line.

In May 2018, Shygirl released her debut EP via Nuxxe, Cruel Practice, featuring production from Navarrete on every track. The EP gained positive attention from multiple high-profile publications, such as Pitchfork, Crack Magazine and Tiny Mixtapes.

In October 2018, Navarrete unveiled his next EP, self*care, his first full-length project released via Nuxxe. For the EP, Navarrete invited 6 filmmakers – Bryan M. Ferguson, Brooke Candy, Jade Jackman, Tash Tung, Jasper Jarvis, and BEA1991 – to create their own interpretations of 'self care'. The EP also marked a new direction for Navarrete, as he began using his own vocals more prominently than on any other previous release. The EP is also notable for having artwork designed by PC Music musician and visual artist Hannah Diamond.

=== 2019–2021: Salvador and Romeo ===
In January 2019, Navarrete surprise-released the "Mimi" single, as well as playing a headlining live show in London's Hoxton Hall in February.

2019 bore many collaborations with other indie artists, such as Cosima, Col3trane, Nadia Tehran and MISOGI, among others, as well as further collaborations with Oklou and Shygirl. Nuxxe also released Coucou Chloe's Naughty Dog EP in May.

2019 also marked Nuxxe's highest profile artist signing and album release: American rapper and singer Brooke Candy and her October-released debut album, SEXORCISM. The album features a slew of features from the likes of Charli XCX, Iggy Azalea, and Rico Nasty, among many others. Candy had faced many delays and blocks towards releasing her debut album, with plans to release it dating as far back as 2014. When Candy and Navarrete spoke on a panel together for LoomFest May 2019 in Barcelona, Candy was made aware of the Nuxxe label that Sega Bodega co-runs and conversations on releasing the album on Nuxxe were struck. Navarrete himself co-produced one track on the album: the single "Drip" featuring American singer, actress, and television personality Erika Jayne.

In November 2019, Navarrete released the single "U Suck", which would be the lead single for his debut album Salvador. The single delved into a more synth-pop direction, and again featured Navarrete's vocals prominently. He then played a headlining show in St Pancras Old Church, London with a backing string quartet in December, to promote the single and premiere upcoming music from his album. The track was also accompanied with a music video by frequent collaborator Bryan M. Ferguson.

In early January 2020, Navarrete announced his debut album Salvador for a 14 February release. The same day as the announcement, he released the single "Salv Goes to Hollywood". The track combines the more vocal-heavy ideas of his recent work, with his roots in deconstructed club music and intense bass.

Salvador was released in February to acclaim from publications like Paste Magazine, Resident Advisor and Pitchfork, among others, and fans alike.

Navarrete released a Bandcamp exclusive covers EP, titled Reestablishing Connection, in May 2020. All profits were donated to the AIM COVID-19 Crisis Fund. It featured Lafawndah, covering Massive Attack's "Teardrop", Låpsley, covering Gwen Stefani's "Cool", Dorian Electra, covering Wheatus' "Teenage Dirtbag", Teddy<3, covering Britney Spears' "Sometimes", and Oklou, covering Mauro Picotto's "Komodo".

Navarrete also continued to collaborate with Oklou on her debut mixtape Galore, released in September, contributing production to two tracks, and Shygirl's ALIAS EP, released in November, acting as co-executive producer alongside Shygirl on the project. Among these established collaborators, Navarrete also contributed heavily to American rapper Zebra Katz's debut record LESS IS MOOR in March, and appeared on Dorian Electra's My Agenda project in October, as a featured artist (which was his first time appearing as such) and as a co-producer on two tracks.

In early November, Navarrete released a collaborative single with English musician Låpsley, titled "Make U Stay". The track was released with a music video directed by regular collaborator Bryan M. Ferguson.

In an Instagram Q&A in early May 2021, Navarrete revealed a slew of artists he has been collaborating with, including Caroline Polachek, Arca, FKA twigs, Charlotte Gainsbourg, slowthai, and Christine and the Queens, among many others. The same month, he announced a vinyl reissue of his Salvador album, including the bonus track "Heaven Fell (Reprise)", which features additional vocals from Polachek. He also hosted a special concert performance film, available via ticket purchase, to close off the era of the Salvador album.

Navarrete released a single titled "Only Seeing God When I Come" on 8 September, indicative of a new musical era, followed soon after by "Angel On My Shoulder", and the announcement of his second studio album, Romeo, which released 12 November 2021, and features Arca and Charlotte Gainsbourg. "I Need Nothing From You" was released as the final single from the album. Navarrete toured the album throughout 2022, including as a supporting act on tour with Flume in California and Arizona.

=== 2022–present: Nymph, Björk, Kiss Facility, Dennis ===
Navarrete worked on tracks for FKA twigs, Eartheater, Sophie Ellis Bextor, and Daniela Lalita, among others throughout 2022. He executive produced Donna Missal's in the mirror, in the night EP released in February that year.

Shygirl released her debut album Nymph in September 2022, executive produced by Navarrete. The album garnered award nominations at AIM Independent Music Awards, Libera Awards, and Mercury Prize. He additionally released the single "Kepko" in November that year.

In January 2023, Navarrete and Shygirl remixed Björk's "Ovule". Björk would also remix Shygirl's "Woe" later in March, a remix which Navarrete co-produced. Navarrete continued to collaborate with other artists such as Caroline Polachek, slowthai, and Eartheater. In May 2023, Navarrete formed the project Kiss Facility with Emirati-Egyptian artist Mayah Alkhateri. The duo released three singles, which supported the Esoteric EP, which released in October 2023. He released a single with Safety Trance, titled "Arena!" in September 2023. He stated it would be a standalone single released while he finished his upcoming album, on social media. He also co-produced Björk and ROSALÍA's collaborative single "Oral", which released in November 2023.

Navarrete began teasing his next album Dennis with the single "Deer Teeth" in January 2024, followed by "Set Me Free, I'm an Animal" in February. He announced the album for release on 26 April 2024 alongside the release of the next single "Elk Skin" in March. A final single titled "True" was released the week before the album's release in April. He will embark on the Tears, Tours and Sighs tour to promote the album, visiting Europe and North America from September through November 2024. Additionally, Kiss Facility will support Danish singer Erika de Casier on tour throughout Europe from May through July 2024.

== Personal life ==
Navarrete has been open about his struggles with alcoholism, stating he often hid his anxieties behind drinking, "For the first two years when I got to London, I kind of just partied more, and more... I was the intense guy who was always drunk. It actually takes a long time to re-establish yourself as not 'that' person." He has also stated that quitting alcohol was the hardest thing he has ever done.

Navarrete has also been open about his struggles with mental health, writing an op-ed and guide on self-care in 2018 for i-D, coinciding with the release of his EP titled self*care.

Navarrete formerly had a relationship with Mimi Wade. He is currently in a relationship with Mayah Alkhateri, his bandmate in Kiss Facility.

== Discography ==
=== Albums ===
Title	Details
Salvador	Released: 14 February 2020; Label: Nuxxe; Formats: LP, digital download, streaming
Romeo	Released: 12 November 2021; Label: Nuxxe; Formats: LP, digital download, streaming
Dennis	Released: 26 April 2024; Label: ambient tweets; Formats: LP, digital download, streaming
I Created the Universe so That Life Could Create a Language so Complex, Just to Say How Much I Love You	Released: 28 November 2025; Label: ambient tweets; Formats: CD, digital download, streaming
Khazna (with Mayah Alkhateri, as Kiss Facility)	Released: 27 February 2026; Label: ambient tweets, Supernature; Formats: LP, digital download, streaming

=== EPs ===
Title	Details
Song Dynasty	Released: 12 February 2013; Label: Week of Wonders; Formats: LP, digital download
34	Released: 1 April 2013; Label: Week of Wonders; Formats: LP, digital download, streaming
Sportswear	Released: 23 October 2015; Label: Activia Benz; Formats: Digital download, streaming
SS	Released: 30 October 2015; Label: Nuxxe; Formats: Digital download, streaming
Ess B	Released: 24 February 2017; Label: Crazylegs; Formats: Digital download, streaming
self*care	Released: 24 October 2018; Label: Nuxxe; Formats: LP, digital download, streaming
Reestablishing Connection	Released: 15 May 2020; Label: Self-released; Formats: Digital download
Esoteric (with Mayah Alkhateri, as Kiss Facility)	Released: 6 October 2023; Label: Supernature; Formats: LP, digital download, streaming

=== Mixtapes ===
Title	Details
SS	Released: 10 November 2017; Label: Nuxxe; Formats: Digital download, streaming

=== Singles ===
Title	Album	Label	Year
"Stay Nervous"	Song Dynasty	Week of Wonders	2014
"CC" (featuring Shygirl)	Ess B	Crazylegs	2017
"Nivea" / "Bacardi"	Non-album single	Crazylegs	2017
"Kisses 2 My Phone"	self*care	Nuxxe	2018
"Mimi"	Non-album single	Nuxxe	2019
"U Suck"	Salvador	Nuxxe	2019
"Salv Goes to Hollywood"	Salvador	Nuxxe	2020
"Make U Stay" (with Låpsley)	Non-album single	Nuxxe	2020
"Heaven Fell (Reprise)"	Salvador	Nuxxe	2021
"Only Seeing God When I Come"	Romeo	Nuxxe	2021
"Angel on My Shoulder"	Romeo	Nuxxe	2021
"I Need Nothing from You"	Romeo	Nuxxe	2021
"Kepko"	Dennis	Nuxxe, Supernature	2022
"Arena!" (with Safety Trance)	Non-album single	Nuxxe, Supernature	2023
"Deer Teeth"	Dennis	Ambient Tweets, Supernature	2024
"Set Me Free, I'm an Animal"	Dennis	Ambient Tweets, Supernature	2024
"Elk Skin"	Dennis	Ambient Tweets, Supernature	2024
"True"	Dennis	Ambient Tweets, Supernature	2024
"Set Me Free, I'm an Animal" (Florence Sinclair Dreamix)	Dennis	Ambient Tweets, Supernature	2024
"Coma Salv" (Nap Mix)	Dennis	Ambient Tweets, Supernature	2024
"Pipe" (with Vashti Bunyan)	I Created the Universe so That Life Could Create a Language so Complex, Just To Say How Much I Love You	Ambient Tweets	2025

=== Remixes ===
Title	Artist(s)	Year
"If"	Toboggan	2014
"Voices"	Dawn Richard	2017
"All Around the World" (featuring Desiigner and Chynna)	Mura Masa	2017
"Friendless"	Oklou	2018
"Ovule" (with Shygirl)	Björk	2023
"Bunny Is a Rider"	Caroline Polachek	2023

=== Other tracks ===
Title	Album	Label	Year
"Jansen"	—N/a	Secret Songs	2014
"Jaxon"	Singles Club Executive Lounge: Celebrating 50 Years of Activia Benz	Activia Benz	2016
"I'll Never B"	LuckyMe Advent Calendar 17	LuckyMe	2018
"There Is Something I Can't Find" (as KFR, with Mayah Alkhateri)	Boys Noize presents ONES and ZEROS	Ones and Zeros	2025

=== Songwriting and production credits ===
Year	Title	Artist(s)	Album	Credits	Writer(s)	Producer(s)
2016	"Want More"	Shygirl	Non-album single	Producer	Blane Muise	Sega Bodega
2016	"Spit Intent"	Y6140	Non-album single	Co-producer	Chloé Olivié	Chloé Olivié, Navarrete
2017	"Weep"	Y6140	Non-album single	Co-producer	Chloé Olivié	Chloé Olivié, Navarrete
2017	"MSRY"	Shygirl	MSRYNVR	Producer	Blane Muise	Sega Bodega
2017	"NVR"	Shygirl	MSRYNVR	Producer	Blane Muise	Sega Bodega
2017	"Flip U"	COUCOU CHLOE	Erika Jane	Co-writer/co-producer	Chloé Olivié, Navarrete	Navarrete, Chloé Olivié
2018	"Friendless"	Oklou	The Rite of May	Additional production	Oklou	Oklou, Sega Bodega (add.), Krampf (add.)
2018	"Rude"	Shygirl	Cruel Practice	Producer	Blane Muise	Sega Bodega
2018	"O"	Shygirl	Cruel Practice	Producer	Blane Muise	Sega Bodega
2018	"Nasty"	Shygirl	Cruel Practice	Producer	Blane Muise	Sega Bodega
2018	"Gush"	Shygirl	Cruel Practice	Co-producer	Blane Muise	Sega Bodega, Dinamarca
2018	"Asher Wolfe"	Shygirl	Cruel Practice	Producer	Blane Muise	Sega Bodega
2018	"U.A.F.W.M."	Quay Dash	Non-album single	Producer	Quay Dash	Sega Bodega
2019	"R U Lonely 2?"	Cosima	Non-album single	Co-producer	Cosima, Fryars	Fryars, Sega Bodega
2019	"Ferment"	Murlo	Dolos	Co-writer/producer	Murlo, Sega Bodega	Sega Bodega
2019	"Problems in Us"	Col3trane	Heroine	Co-writer/co-producer	Cole Basta, Jay Mooncie, Navarrete	J Moon, Sega Bodega
2019	"Tell Nobody"	Nadia Tehran	Dozakh: All Lovers Hell	Co-writer/co-producer	Fabian Berglund, Nadia Kardar Tehran, Patrick Alvarsson, Navarrete	Sega Bodega, Nadia Tehran, DJ HAYDN
2019	"Bleached"	Misogi	Blood Moon Underworld	Co-writer	Falls, MISOGI, Navarrete, Zain Siddiqui	Falls, MISOGI
2019	"Uckers"	Shygirl	Non-album single	Producer	Blane Muise	Sega Bodega
2019	"Teasr"	Elheist	Wholesome Goody	Producer	Elheist	Sega Bodega
2019	"Close to You (Moonlighting)"	Cosima	Non-album single	Co-producer	Cosima Ehni, Duncan James, Matt Parad	Sega Bodega, Duncan James, Matt Parad
2019	"BB"	Shygirl	Non-album single	Co-writer/producer	Blane Muise, Sega Bodega	Sega Bodega
2019	"Forever"	oklou	Non-album single	Co-producer	Oklou	Oklou, Sega Bodega (co.)
2019	"Drip" (feat. Erika Jayne)	Brooke Candy	SEXORCISM	Co-writer/co-producer	Brooke Candy, Oscar Scheller, Ashnikko, Navarrete, Jesse Saint John	Sega Bodega, Oscar Scheller, Raf Riley
2020	"Ish"	Zebra Katz	Less Is Moor	Co-writer/producer	Zebra Katz, Navarrete	Sega Bodega
2020	"Blush"	Zebra Katz	Less Is Moor	Co-writer/producer	Zebra Katz, Navarrete	Sega Bodega
2020	"Moor"	Zebra Katz	Less Is Moor	Co-writer/co-producer	Zebra Katz, Navarrete, Michael Carr	Walter Gross, Sega Bodega
2020	"Sleepn"	Zebra Katz	Less Is Moor	Co-writer/producer	Zebra Katz, Navarrete	Sega Bodega
2020	"Lick It n Split" (feat. Shygirl)	Zebra Katz	Less Is Moor	Co-writer/producer	Zebra Katz, Blane Muise, Navarrete	Sega Bodega
2020	"Control" (feat. Isamaya Ffrench & Izambard)	God Colony	Cult	Co-writer	God Colony, Isamaya Ffrench, Izambard, Sega Bodega	God Colony
2020	"God's Chariots"	oklou	Galore	Drum production	Marylou Mayniel, Casey Manierka, Blane Muise	Oklou, Casey MQ (co.), Sega Bodega (drum), Florian Le Prisé (drum)
2020	"Rosebud"	oklou	Galore	Additional production	Marylou Mayniel, Casey Manierka	Oklou, Casey MQ, Sega Bodega (add.), Florian Le Prisé (drum)
2020	"M'Lady"	Dorian Electra	My Agenda	Co-writer/co-producer	Dorian Electra, Count Baldor, Sega Bodega, Will Vaughan	Count Baldor, Sega Bodega, Will Vaughan
2020	"Barbie Boy" (feat. Sega Bodega)	Dorian Electra	My Agenda	Featured artist/co-writer/co-producer	Dorian Electra, Sega Bodega	Count Baldor, Sega Bodega
2020	"Like"	Alissic	Non-album single	Co-producer	Alissa Salls, Oli Sykes	Dan Lancaster, Sega Bodega
2020	"Seven"	Shygirl	Alias	Co-writer/co-producer	Sega Bodega, Shygirl	Sega Bodega
2020	"Slime"	Shygirl	Alias	Co-writer/co-producer	Sophie, Sega Bodega, Kai Whiston, Shygirl	Sega Bodega, Sophie, Kai Whiston
2020	"Freak"	Shygirl	Alias	Co-writer/co-producer	Sega Bodega, Shygirl	Sega Bodega
2020	"Tasty"	Shygirl	Alias	Co-writer/additional producer	Oscar Scheller, Sega Bodega	Oscar Scheller, Sega Bodega (add.)
2020	"Siren"	Shygirl	Alias	Co-writer/co-producer	Happa, Sega Bodega	Happa, Sega Bodega
2021	"BDE" (feat. slowthai)	Shygirl	Non-album single	Co-producer	Shygirl, Sam Knowles, slowthai	Karma Kid, Sega Bodega
2021	"Scripture"	Eartheater	Non-album single	Co-writer/co-producer	Alexandra Drewchin, Navarrete	Eartheater, Sega Bodega
2021	"Cleo"	Shygirl	Non-album single	Co-producer	Shygirl, James Jacob	Sega Bodega, Jakwob, Shygirl
2021	"Tranquility"	BEA1991	Non-album single	Co-writer/producer	Beatriz de Rijke, Navarrete	Sega Bodega
2021	"1 Pill 2 Pill"	Dorian Electra	My Agenda (Deluxe)	Producer	Dorian Electra	Sega Bodega
2021	"Chainmail"	Dorian Electra	My Agenda (Deluxe)	Co-producer	Dorian Electra, Weston Allen	Sega Bodega, Count Baldor, Will Vaughan
2022	"Papi Bones" (feat. Shygirl)	FKA twigs	CAPRISONGS	Drum production	Pablo Díaz-Reixa, Pablo Martinez Albroch, Jonathan Coffer, Amanda Ghost, Blane Muise, FKA twigs	FKA twigs, El Guincho, Fakeguido, Jonathan Coffer, Koreless (add.), Sega Bodega (drum)
2022	"Butterfly"	Donna Missal	In The Mirror, In The Night EP	Co-writer/producer	Donna Missal, Sega Bodega	Sega Bodega, Danny L Harle (add.), Samuel Organ (add.)
2022	"Skin"	Donna Missal	In The Mirror, In The Night EP	Co-writer/producer	Donna Missal, Sega Bodega, Chloe Angelides, Tim Anderson, WaveIQ	Sega Bodega
2022	"Insecure"	Donna Missal	In The Mirror, In The Night EP	Co-writer/co-producer	Donna Missal, Sega Bodega, Mura Masa	Mura Masa, Sega Bodega
2022	"(To Me) Your Face Is Love"	Donna Missal	In The Mirror, In The Night EP	Co-writer/producer	Donna Missal, Sega Bodega	Sega Bodega
2022	"Sex Is Good (But Have You Tried)"	Donna Missal	In The Mirror, In The Night EP	Co-writer/producer	Donna Missal, Sega Bodega	Sega Bodega
2022	"Tambaleo"	Meth Math	m♡rtal	Co-writer/producer	Angelica Ballesteros, José Efrén Valenzuela Coronado, Juan Ernesto Robles Acosta, Navarrete	Sega Bodega
2022	"Mitosis"	Eartheater	Non-album single	Producer	Eartheather	Sega Bodega
2022	"Hypnotized"	Sophie Ellis-Bextor	Non-album single	Additional production	Sophie Ellis-Bextor, Peter Ferguson	Wuh Oh, Sega Bodega (add.)
2022	"Tenía Razón"	Daniela Lalita	Trececerotres	Co-writer/co-producer	Daniela Lalita, Sega Bodega	Daniela Lalita, Sega Bodega
2022	"Woe"	Shygirl	Nymph	Co-writer/co-producer	Shygirl, Karma Kid, Sega Bodega, Daniel Harle, Caroline Polachek	Shygirl, Karma Kid, Sega Bodega
2022	"Shlut"	Shygirl	Nymph	Co-writer/co-producer/additional vocals	Shygirl, BloodPop, Sega Bodega, Cosha	Shygirl, BloodPop, Sega Bodega
2022	"Little Bit"	Shygirl	Nymph	Co-writer/co-producer	Shygirl, Sega Bodega	Shygirl, Sega Bodega
2022	"Firefly"	Shygirl	Nymph	Co-writer/co-producer	Shygirl, Kingdom, Sega Bodega, Cecile Believe, Tremaine Aldon Neverson, Troy Taylor	Shygirl, Kingdom, Sega Bodega, Cecile Believe (add.)
2022	"Coochie (a bedtime story)"	Shygirl	Nymph	Co-writer/co-producer	Shygirl, Karma Kid, Mura Masa, Sega Bodega, Cosha	Shygirl, Karma Kid, Mura Masa, Sega Bodega
2022	"Heaven"	Shygirl	Nymph	Co-writer/additional production	Shygirl, Mura Masa, Kingdom, Sega Bodega, Danny L Harle	Shygirl, Mura Masa, Kingdom, Sega Bodega (add.)
2022	"Poison"	Shygirl	Nymph	Co-writer/additional production	Shygirl, Danny L Harle, Sega Bodega	Shygirl, Danny L Harle, Sega Bodega (add.)
2022	"Honey"	Shygirl	Nymph	Co-producer	Shygirl, Vegyn, Carter Lang	Shygirl, Vegyn, Mura Masa (add.), Sega Bodega (add.)
2022	"Missin u"	Shygirl	Nymph	Co-writer/co-producer	Shygirl, Sega Bodega	Shygirl, Sega Bodega
2022	"Wildfire"	Shygirl	Nymph	Co-writer/co-producer	Shygirl, Sega Bodega, BloodPop, Noah Goldstein, Cosha	Shygirl, Sega Bodega, BloodPop, Noah Goldstein
2022	"Out of luck"	K	Non-album single	Co-writer/producer	Ekaterina Kishchuk, Sega Bodega, Blane Muise	Sega Bodega
2023	"Sunset"	Caroline Polachek	Desire, I Want to Turn Into You	Co-writer/co-producer	Caroline Polachek, Navarrete, Caroline Ailin	Caroline Polachek, Sega Bodega
2023	"Feel Good"	slowthai	UGLY	Co-writer/co-producer	slowthai, Sega Bodega, Kwes Darko, Dan Carey	Sega Bodega, Kwes Darko, Dan Carey
2023	"Woe (I See It From Your Side)" (Björk Remix)	Shygirl	Nymph_o	Co-writer/co-producer	Shygirl, Björk, Cosha, Karma Kid, Mura Masa, Sega Bodega	Shygirl, Karma Kid, Mura Masa, Sega Bodega, Björk
2023	"Shlut" (feat. Sevdaliza)	Shygirl	Nymph_o	Co-writer/co-producer	Shygirl, Sevdaliza, Sega Bodega	Shygirl, Sega Bodega
2023	"Drown in the Clouds of Dew"	Rozie Ramati	TBA	Producer	Rozie Ramiti	Sega Bodega
2023	"Pendulum"	KWAYE	TBA	Producer	Kwayedza Kureya	Sega Bodega
2023	"Pure Smile Snake Venom"	Eartheater	Powders	Co-writer/co-producer	Alexandra Drewchin, Navarrete	Eartheater, Sega Bodega
2023	"Devil's Chariot"	LSDXOXO	Delusions of Grandeur (D.O.G.) EP	Co-producer	LSDXOXO, Oklou, Casey MQ, Shygirl	LSDXOXO, Sega Bodega
2023	"Oral"	Björk and Rosalía	Non-album single	Additional production	Björk Guðmundsdóttir	Björk, Rosalía, Sega Bodega (add.)
2024	"tell me" (with Boys Noize)	Shygirl	Club Shy	Co-writer/co-producer	Shygirl, Boys Noize, Sega Bodega	Boys Noize, Sega Bodega
2024	"thicc" (with Cosha)	Shygirl	Club Shy	Co-writer/co-producer	Shygirl, Cosha, Karma Kid, Sega Bodega	Karma Kid, Mark Ralph, Sega Bodega
2024	"Good Torture" (with Elyanna)	Sevdaliza	TBA	Co-writer	Sevda Alizadeh, Mathias Janmaat, Mihai Puscoiu, Navarrete, Abeer Margieh, Elian Margieh, Faris Margieh, Nasir Atweh	Sevdaliza, Mathias Janmaat
2024	"Here I Am" (feat. Donna Missal)	Kacy Hill	BUG	Co-writer/co-producer	Kacy Hill, Donna Missal, Aaron Wing, Sega Bodega, Tommy King	Kacy Hill, Sega Bodega, Tommy King
2024	"In The Studio (Demo)"	Dorian Electra	Fanfare: The Lost Demos	Co-writer/co-producer	Dorian Electra, Count Baldor, Weston Allen, Sega Bodega	Count Baldor, Sega Bodega
2025	"Party People"	Rose Gray	Louder, Please	Co-writer/producer	Rose Gray, Sur Back, Sega Bodega	Sega Bodega
2025	"Daylight Heist"	kukii	Rare Baby	Co-producer	kukii	Cecile Believe, Loubenski, Nightfeelings, Samir Alikhanizadeh, Sega Bodega, kukii
2025	"Poolside Goth"	Uffie	TBA	Co-writer/producer	Anna Hartley, Ferras Alqaisi, Lasse Lokøy, Sega Bodega	Sega Bodega
2025	"I'm quitting my job tomorri"	Jordan Firstman	Secrets	Co-writer	Blake Slatkin, Brad Oberhofer, Jordan Firstman, Salvador Navarrete	Blake Slatkin, Brad Oberhofer
2025	"Poop is pee and pee is poop" (feat. Rachel Sennott)	Jordan Firstman	Secrets	Co-writer/producer	Jordan Firstman, Rachel Sennott, Salvador Navarrete	Sega Bodega
2025	"Mother's prayer" (feat. Jordan's Mother)	Jordan Firstman	Secrets	Co-writer/co-producer	Brad Oberhofer, Jordan Firstman, Salvador Navarrete	Brad Oberhofer, Sega Bodega
2025	"I'm hoarding cum"	Jordan Firstman	Secrets	Co-writer/co-producer	Brad Oberhofer, Jordan Firstman, Salvador Navarrete	Brad Oberhofer, Sega Bodega
2025	"Te Enseño" (feat. Mayah Alkhateri)	VVUTURA	TBA	Producer	Stephanie Perez, Mayah Alkhateri, Toumba	Sega Bodega
