= Romeo (album) =

Studio album by Sega Bodega
- Released: 12 November 2021
- Genres: Electronic; dance; electronica; experimental
- Length: 35:17
- Languages: English; French (Note: Gainsbourg's vocals on "Naturopathe"); Spanish (Note: Arca's vocals on "Cicada")
- Label: Nuxxe
- Producers: Sega Bodega; Taylor Skye

Sega Bodega chronology
Reestablishing Connection (2020)	Romeo (2021)	Dennis (2024)

Singles from Romeo
- 1. "Only Seeing God When I Come" Released: 8 September 2021; 2. "Angel on My Shoulder" Released: 29 September 2021; 3. "I Need Nothing from You" Released: 3 November 2021

Professional ratings
Review scores
Source	Rating
Clash	8/10
Pitchfork	7.2/10

Romeo is the second studio album by Irish-Scottish music producer and musician Sega Bodega. It was released via his Nuxxe label on 12 November 2021. It features French actor and singer Charlotte Gainsbourg, and Venezuelan music producer and artist Arca.

It was preceded by the single releases of "Only Seeing God When I Come", "Angel On My Shoulder", and "I Need Nothing From You".

The album details a conceptual, fictionalised relationship between Sega Bodega and "a girlfriend made entirely of light, named Luci". He has described the album as "the record I always wanted to make". The album also explores themes of close connection to others, with the single "Angel On My Shoulder" being about the idea of never meeting a close friend, and "Um Um" being inspired by the memory of the late producer Sophie, whom Sega Bodega was close to.

The album art, and its respective singles and promotional art, were shot by Aidan Zamiri.

== Track listing ==
All tracks are produced by Sega Bodega, except "All Of Your Friends Think I'm Too Young For You", produced by Sega Bodega and Taylor Skye.

No.	Title	Writer(s)	Length
1.	"Effeminacy"	Sega Bodega	2:55
2.	"Angel On My Shoulder"	Sega Bodega	4:02
3.	"All Of Your Friends Think I'm Too Young For You"	Sega Bodega; Taylor Skye	3:10
4.	"Only Seeing God When I Come"	Sega Bodega; Donna Missal	3:20
5.	"I Need Nothing From You"	Sega Bodega; BEA1991	3:38
6.	"Naturopathe" (featuring Charlotte Gainsbourg)	Sega Bodega; Gainsbourg	3:16
7.	"Cicada" (featuring Arca)	Sega Bodega; Arca	3:53
8.	"Romeo"	Sega Bodega	3:02
9.	"Um Um"	Sega Bodega; Isamaya Ffrench	4:06
10.	"Luci"	Sega Bodega	3:55
Total length:			35:17

== Personnel ==
- Sega Bodega – vocals, production
- Taylor Skye – production (track 3)
- Conall – additional vocals (track 5)
- Kwaye – additional vocals (track 5)
- BEA1991 – additional vocals (track 5)
- Charlotte Gainsbourg – featured vocals (track 6)
- Arca – featured vocals (track 7)
- Isamaya Ffrench – additional vocals (track 9)
- James Rand – mixing, mastering
- Katie Tavini – mixing, mastering
