= Rationale =

Rationale may refer to:

- An explanation of the basis or fundamental reasons for something
  - Design rationale, an explicit documentation of the reasons behind design decisions
- Rationale (vestment), a liturgical vestment worn by some Roman Catholic bishops
- Rationale (musician) (born 1984), Zimbabwean-born British singer and songwriter
  - Rationale (Rationale album), 2017
- Rationale (Glitterer album), 2024

== See also ==
- Rationality
- Rational (disambiguation)
- Rationalism (disambiguation)
- Rationalization (disambiguation)
