= Salvador (Sega Bodega album) =

Studio album by Sega Bodega
- Released: 14 February 2020
- Genre: Electronic; trip hop; experimental pop
- Length: 36:55
- Label: NUXXE
- Producer: Sega Bodega

Sega Bodega chronology
| self*care (2018) | Salvador (2020) | Establishing Connection (2020) |

Singles from Salvador
- 1. "U Suck" Released: 4 November 2019; 2. "Salv Goes To Hollywood" Released: 15 January 2020

Salvador is the debut album by Irish music producer and musician, Salvador Navarrete, known better by his stage name, Sega Bodega. It was released via his NUXXE label on 14 February 2020.

Working largely as a record producer up until the album's release, Salvador often showcases a more personal side of Navarrete's musicianship, exploring themes of religion, addiction, romantic and sexual relationships, as well as a close friend's suicide.

It was supported by the singles "U Suck", and "Salv Goes to Hollywood".

== Track listing ==
All tracks written and produced by Sega Bodega.

| No. | Title | Length |
|---|---|---|
| 1. | "2 Strong" | 3:39 |
| 2. | "Masochism" | 3:08 |
| 3. | "Raising Hell" | 4:10 |
| 4. | "U Got The Fever" | 3:41 |
| 5. | "Heaven Knows" | 4:06 |
| 6. | "Salv Goes To Hollywood" | 3:02 |
| 7. | "Knox (Interlude)" | 0:32 |
| 8. | "Smell Of The Rubber" | 4:39 |
| 9. | "U Suck" | 3:27 |
| 10. | "Calvin" | 3:43 |
| 11. | "Kuvasz In Snow" | 2:45 |
| Total length: | | 36:55 |

Heaven Edition vinyl bonus track
| No. | Title | Length |
|---|---|---|
| 12. | "Heaven Fell (Reprise)" | 2:26 |
| Total length: | | 39:21 |

== Personnel ==
Credits adapted from the album's vinyl liner notes.

- Sega Bodega – vocals, production
- Conall Ingus – additional vocals ("Raising Hell")
- Mette – additional vocals ("Raising Hell")
- Oklou – additional vocals ("Raising Hell")
- Shygirl – additional vocals ("Raising Hell")
- Zebra Katz – additional vocals ("Raising Hell")
- Paul Glacial – additional vocals ("U Got The Fever")
- Sarah Lamb – whistling ("U Got The Fever")
- Coucou Chloe – additional vocals ("Smell Of The Rubber")
- Mimi Wade – additional vocals ("U Suck")
- Lucinda Chua – cello ("Kuvasz In Snow")
- Daniela Lalita – additional vocals ("Kuvasz In Snow")
- Caroline Polachek – additional vocals ("Heaven Fell (Reprise)")
- James Rand – mixing
- Robin Petras – mastering
- James Gould – photography
- David Kelly – design

== Release history ==
| Region | Date | Format | Label | Ref. |
|---|---|---|---|---|
| Various | 14 February 2020 | Digital download; streaming | NUXXE | |
| Various | 14 February 2020 | Limited LP | NUXXE | |
| Various | 24 September 2021 | "Heaven Edition" limited LP | NUXXE | |
