= Rationale (musician) =

British singer (born 1984)

- Born: Tinashe Fazakerley; 4 April 1984 (age 42); Highfield, Harare, Zimbabwe
- Genres: Indie pop; synthpop; R&B; acoustic
- Occupations: Singer; songwriter
- Instrument: Vocals
- Labels: Best Laid Plans; Warner Music UK; Universal Island
- Website: iamrationale.com

Tinashe Fazakerley (born 4 April 1984), now professionally known as Rationale, is a Zimbabwe-born British singer and songwriter, formerly known as Tinashé. He is known for his R&B and indie pop style, with electronic influences. Under his alias Tinashé, he was known for his synthpop sound and African influences.

== Early life ==
Fazakerley was born in the Harare township of Highfield. At the age of nine, he and his three siblings moved to the United Kingdom in the Camberwell district of London, where his single mother was working as a nurse. Later, at the age of eleven, he moved to the London borough of Hackney and music began to play a more significant role in his life as he learned to play the guitar. His influences varied, ranging from Jimi Hendrix, Prince, Pat Metheny, Donnie Hathaway, and Al Green, to Tupac Shakur, A Tribe Called Quest, and the Notorious B.I.G.

== Career ==
=== Tinashé and singing hiatus (2009–2014) ===
In 2010, after releasing two EPs and three singles, Fazakerley released the album Saved under the name Tinashé, but it had limited success.

He took a break from singing and went on to become a songwriter and producer, working with producer Mark Crew while writing songs for blues artist Rag'n'Bone Man, among others. He also wrote songs for the Swiss version of the talent show The Voice.

=== Rationale (2015–present) ===
In 2015, Fazakerley relaunched his career as Rationale, releasing songs such as "Fast Lane" and "Something for Nothing" on SoundCloud and Spotify. It was on these streaming platforms that he gained recognition, with a mention by Pharrell Williams on his Apple Music Beats1 radio show, OTHERtone, calling him someone who had "found the beauty in their voice". This helped elevate "Fast Lane" to No. 2 within its first week on the Spotify Global Viral Chart, reach No. 1 on Hype Machine, and amass more than 1.3 million views on SoundCloud. Rationale also received praise from Justin Timberlake and Elton John. He became one of the first artists to be signed to Dan Smith of Bastille's new record label, Best Laid Plans.

Rationale's debut, self-titled album was released on 6 October 2017, under exclusive license to Warner Music UK.

Rationale is credited as a songwriter and producer on Katy Perry's 2017 album, Witness, on the song "Act My Age". His single "Tethered" has been covered live by Ellie Goulding.

In 2019, Rationale was featured on Big Wild's album Superdream, on the song "6's to 9's".

In 2021, he was featured on Model Man's self-titled album, on the song "Esc (Holding Back)".

== Discography ==
=== As Tinashé ===
Albums

- Saved (2010)

EPs

- Saved (2009)
- Mayday (2010)
- Zambezi (2010)

Singles

- "Mayday" (2010)
- "Zambezi" (2010)
- "Saved" (2010)

=== As Rationale ===
Albums

- Rationale (2017)
- Metanoia (2025)

EPs

- Fuel to the Fire (2015)
- Vessels (2017)
- High Hopes (2018)

Singles

- "Fast Lane" (2015)
- "Re.Up" (2015)
- "Fuel to the Fire" (2015)
- "Something for Nothing" (2016)
- "Palms" (2016)
- "Prodigal Son" (2016)
- "Vessels" (2016)
- "Reciprocate" (2017)
- "Tethered" (2017)
- "Deliverance" (2017)
- "Loving Life" (2017)
- "Into the Blue" (2017)
- "Losing Sleep" (2017)
- "Somewhere to Belong" (2017)
- "Oil & Water" (2017)
- "Phenomenal" (2017)
- "Tumbling Down" (2018)
- "One by One" (2018)
- "Kindred" (2018)
- "High Hopes" (2018)
- "73" (2018)
- "Say What's on Your Mind" (2019)
- "Hurts the Most" (2019)
- "Whiskey Regrets" (2020)
- "Wash Over Me" (2022)
- "Freedom" (2022)
- "Every Mountain" (2023)
- "Feel It Coming" (2024)
- "The Beginning" (2025)
- "See the Light" (2025)
- "Chasing Stars" (2025)
- "Little Loving" (2025)

== Songwriting and production credits ==
Title	Year	Artist(s)	Album	Credits	Written with	Produced with
"Guilty"	2014	Rag'n'Bone Man	Wolves EP	Co-writer	Rory Graham, Mark Crew, Daniel Priddy	-
"Wolves"	2014	Rag'n'Bone Man	Wolves EP	Co-writer	Rory Graham, Mark Crew, Daniel Priddy	-
"Life in Her Yet"	2014	Rag'n'Bone Man	Wolves EP	Co-writer	Rory Graham, Mark Crew, Daniel Priddy	-
"Disfigured"	2015	Rag'n'Bone Man	Disfigured EP	Co-writer	Rory Graham, Andrew Jackson	-
"Love Is a Drug"	2015	Mark Feehily	Fire	Co-writer	Mark Feehily, Steve Anderson	-
"Only You"	2015	Mark Feehily	Fire	Co-writer	Mark Feehily, Steve Anderson	-
"Wash the Pain Away"	2015	Mark Feehily	Fire	Co-writer	Mark Feehily, Steve Anderson	-
"Cut You Out"	2015	Mark Feehily	Fire	Co-writer	Mark Feehily, Anu Pillai	-
"Dynamite" (featuring Pretty Sister)	2016	Nause	Non-album single	Co-writer	Jacob Criborn, Leonard Scheja, Sacha Skarbek	-
"Act My Age"	2017	Katy Perry	Witness	Co-writer/producer	Katheryn Hudson, Mark Crew, Sarah Hudson	Ilya, Mark Crew
"Paralyzed"	2018	Kwaye	Love & Affliction EP	Co-writer/producer	Kwayedza Kureya	Henry Guy
"6's to 9's" (featuring Rationale)	2019	Big Wild	Superdream	Co-writer/featured vocals	Jackson Stell	-
"Release Me" (featuring Rationale)	2020	Billon	-	Co-writer/producer/featured vocals	Ed Butler	Billon
"Dream Killer"	2020	HYYTS	-	Co-writer	Adam Hunter, Josh Grant, Sam Hunter	-
"What the Hell" (featuring Rationale)	2020	Ayelle	NOMAD (Mixtape)	Co-writer/producer/featured vocals	Amanda Lundstedt	-
"Choice" (featuring Rationale)	2020	Ayelle	NOMAD (Mixtape)	Co-writer/producer/featured vocals	Amanda Lundstedt	-
"Lonely People"	2020	HYYTS	-	Co-writer	Adam Hunter, Fin Dow-Smith, Sam Hunter	-
"Amen"	2020	Tom Grennan	Evering Road	Co-writer	Josh Record, Wayne Hector, Lucian Nagy, Tom Grennan	-
"Why Can't We Get Along"	2021	Zak Abel	-	Co-writer	Zak Abel, George Moore	-
"Esc (Holding Back)" (featuring Rationale)	2021	Model Man	Model Man	Co-writer/featured vocals		
"You're Worth it"	2022	MORGAN	-	Co-writer	Conor Mellis, George Conway, Morgan Connie Smith, Ofer Shaul Ishai, Precious Danielle	-
"Worry"	2022	Ewan Mainwood	Broken EP	Co-writer	Christopher Smith, Ewan Mainwood	-
"Unsaid"	2022	Ewan Mainwood	Broken EP	Co-writer	Christopher Smith, Ewan Mainwood	-
"Girl of Your Dreams"	2022	Dylan	The Greatest Thing I'll Never Learn	Co-writer	Jake Gosling, Dylan	-
"Treat You Bad"	2022	Dylan	The Greatest Thing I'll Never Learn	Co-writer	Edward Carlile, Dylan	-
"Home Is Where the Heart Is"	2022	Dylan	The Greatest Thing I'll Never Learn	Co-writer	Jake Gosling, Dylan	-
"Unconditional" (featuring Rationale)	2023	Quantic	Dancing While Falling	Co-writer/featured vocals	William Holland	-
"Guiding Light"	2023	John Newman	-	Co-writer	Phil Cook, John Newman	-
