= Isamaya Ffrench =

British make-up artist

Isamaya Ffrench (born 9 April 1989) is a British make-up artist and creator of wearable art. She has worked on fashion editorials for several major publications, including Vogue, Dazed, W magazine and Love. Her subjects have included musicians Björk and Rihanna, and models Kendall and Kylie Jenner. Her principal focus is on facial art and decoration that challenges beauty norms.

== Early life and education ==
Born and raised in Cambridge, England, she became interested in physical arts from a young age and moved to London to study 3D design at the Chelsea College of Arts, then product and industrial design at Central Saint Martins, University of the Arts London. She also joined the Theo Adams Company in 2010. She was inspired by Kevyn Aucoin's The Art of Makeup, Making Faces, which she saw at age seven, but did not focus on make-up in her youth, being more interested in other physical art, springboard diving, and ballet. While studying in London she decided to learn face painting to earn money part-time. She started face painting at children's parties and her skill at the craft resulted in her doing the job for children from London high society.

== Career ==
She moved into painting adults faces soon after, and worked on the 2011 spring/summer menswear show for fellow Central Saint Martins alumnus Christopher Shannon. After doing an all-body tiger body painting for a friend, a fellow dancer in her company suggested her to i-D magazine, which resulted in Ffrench's first fashion photography shoot in mid-2011 doing body painting and clay sculpture for Matthew Stone and Alek Wek. She worked alongside a professional make-up artist during the shoot, which led her to purchase her own kit and move towards face decoration. Having come from a physical arts background, she was less interested in beauty conventions and more interested in face decoration as a form of identity construction and working with the structure of the face. She broadened into window dressing with a display for Liberty's for London Fashion Week in 2013.

She continued to work for I-D and became the magazine's beauty editor in April 2014. She also uses nature themes for her facial art, such as landscapes and forests. Ffrench left I-D in 2015 and became ambassador for YSL Beauté, Yves Saint Laurent's cosmetics range that same year. She was appointed Creative Artist Consultant for Tom Ford Beauty in October 2016, where she created the Extrême line including metallic coloured lip lacquers and eye shadow. In 2018 Ffrench became creative director for the newly launched Dazed Beauty section of Dazed magazine. In 2020 she was named Creative director of Byredo Makeup where she created and developed the line for the brand. In 2021 she was made Global beauty director of Burberry.

In 2019 she expressed an interest in the intersection of beauty and genetics, particularly the impact of racial diversity and gender diversity upon beauty norms, and physical health as a status symbol.

In 2020, she was a featured vocalist on two songs, "Control" by God Colony and the "Feel" cover by Sega Bodega from his new album titled Reestablishing Connection. She formed the experimental music project Alto Arc in 2021, alongside George Clarke of Deafheaven, Danny L Harle, and Trayer Tryon of Hundred Waters. They released their debut EP in February 2022. She additionally collaborated with Sega Bodega again on his 2021 Romeo album. She released a collaborative album with English composer Sam Thomas in 2023 titled Mantle.

In June 2022, Isamaya launched her own line of makeup products, Isamaya Beauty. The first collection featured kink-inspired imagery.

In 2024, Nike designed in collaboration with Isamaya Ffrench, a special edition of the Air Max Dn that takes inspiration from women athletes and their influence on the fashion world. Ffrench used the unique design of the upper to play with textures and materials. It also features the Dynamic Air unit system of dual-pressure tubes, which creates a responsive sensation with every step. This results in a fashion-forward design that's comfortable enough to wear from day to night.

== Podcast guest ==
On 4 August 2023, Ffrench attended the 100 Club in London to discuss her life and career on How Long Gone, a Glendale, California-based podcast hosted by Jason Stewart and Chris Black, sponsored by J.Crew.
