= Wang Chong =

1st-century Chinese meteorologist, astronomer, and philosopher

- Born: 27 AD; Kuaiji, Han dynasty (now Shaoxing, Zhejiang, China)
- Died: 97 AD

Philosophical work
- Era: Han dynasty philosophy
- Region: Chinese philosophy
- School: Rationalism, Naturalism
- Main interests: Philosophy, Astronomy, Meteorology
- Notable works: Lunheng
- Notable ideas: Materialism, Criticism of superstition, Scientific explanation of natural phenomena

Wang Chong (Chinese: 王充; pinyin: Wáng Chōng; Wade–Giles: Wang Ch'ung; 27 – c. 97 AD), courtesy name Zhongren (仲任), was a Chinese astronomer, meteorologist, naturalist, philosopher, and writer active during the Eastern Han dynasty. He developed a rational, secular, naturalistic and mechanistic account of the world and of human beings and gave a materialistic explanation of the origin of the universe. His main work was the Lunheng (論衡, "Critical Essays"). This book contained many theories involving early sciences of astronomy and meteorology, and Wang Chong was even the first in Chinese history to mention the use of the square-pallet chain pump, which became common in irrigation and public works in China thereafter. Wang also accurately described the process of the water cycle.

Unlike most of the Chinese philosophers of his period, Wang spent much of his life in non-self-inflicted poverty. He was said to have studied by standing at bookstalls, and had a superb memory, which allowed him to become very well-versed in the Chinese classics. He eventually reached the rank of District Secretary, a post he soon lost as a result of his combative and anti-authoritarian nature.

== Life ==
1521 edition of Lunheng.

Tomb of Wang Chong.

Wang was born into a poor family in modern Shangyu, Zhejiang. Born a son of Wang Song, he was admired in his local community for his filial piety and devotion to his father. With the urging of his parents, Wang travelled to the Eastern Han capital at Luoyang to study at the Imperial University. It was there that Wang became acquainted with the prestigious historian Ban Biao (3–54), the latter who initiated the Book of Han. He also befriended Ban Gu (32–92), the son of Ban Biao who made further contributions to the Book of Han. Since he was poor and lacked enough money to purchase proper texts of study, Wang had to resort to frequent visits to bookshops to acquire knowledge. Rafe de Crespigny writes that during his studies Wang was most likely influenced by contemporary Old Text realists such as Huan Tan (d. 28). Due to his humble origins, Wang became resentful of officials who were admired simply because of their wealth and power and not for any scholarly abilities.

Wang returned to his home commandery where he became a local teacher. He was elevated as an Officer of Merit, but due to his critical and quarrelsome nature he decided to resign from this position. Following this was a period of isolated retirement when Wang composed essays on philosophy, his Jisu ("On Common Morality"), Jeiyi ("Censures"), Zheng wu ("On Government"), and Yangxing shu ("On Macrobiotics"). About eighty of these essays were later compiled into his Lunheng ("Discourses Weighed in the Balance").

Despite his self-imposed retirement, he eventually accepted an invitation of Inspector Dong Qin (fl. AD 80–90) of Yang province to work as a Headquarters Officer. However, Wang soon resigned from this post as well. Xie Yiwu, a friend of Wang Chong's and a long-standing inspector and official, made an official recommendation to the court requesting that Wang serve as a senior scholar under Emperor Zhang of Han (r. 75–88). Emperor Zhang accepted this and summoned Wang Chong to appear at his court, yet Wang claimed ill health and refused to travel. Wang later died at home around the year 100.

Although Wang's rationalistic philosophy and criticism of so-called New Text Confucianism were largely ignored during his lifetime, the prominent official and later scholar Cai Yong (132–192) wrote of his admiration for Wang's written works. The politician Wang Lang (d. 228) acquired a copy of Wang's Lunheng and brought it with him on his trip in 198 to the Han court established at Xuchang by the notable statesman Cao Cao (155–220). As some of the questionable tenets of the philosophy of New Text Confucianism fell out of use and repute, Rafe de Crespigny states that the rationalist philosophy of Wang Chong became much more influential in Chinese thought.

== Work and philosophy ==
Wang Chong reacted to the state that philosophy had reached in China. Daoism had long ago changed into a religious and magic way, and Confucianism had been the state religion for some 150 years. Confucius and Laozi were worshipped as gods, omens were seen everywhere, belief in ghosts was almost universal, and fengshui had begun to rule people's lives. Wang derided all this and made a vocation of giving a rational, naturalistic account of the world and the human place in it.

At the centre of his thought was the denial that Heaven has any purpose for us, whether benevolent or hostile. To say that Heaven provides us food and clothing is to say it acts as our farmer or tailor—an obvious absurdity. Humans are insignificant specks in the universe and cannot hope to effect changes in it, and it is ludicrous arrogance to think that the universe would change itself for us.

Wang insisted that the words of previous sages should be treated critically, and that they were often contradictory or inconsistent. He criticized scholars of his time for not accepting this, as well as what he called the popular acceptance of written works. He believed that the truth could be discovered, and would become obvious, by making the words clear, and by clear commentary on the text.

One example of Wang's rationality is his argument that thunder must be caused by fire or heat, and is not a sign of the heavens being displeased. He argued that repeatable experience and experiment should be tried before adopting the belief that divine will was involved.

He was equally scathing about the popular belief in ghosts, asking why only human beings should have ghosts and not all living creatures animated by the same vital principle. Further, he argued that so many people have died that their ghosts would vastly outnumber living people; the world would be swamped by them. He never, however, explicitly denies the existence of ghosts (gui 鬼) or spirits (shen 神), he simply separates them from the notion that they are the souls of the dead. He seemed to believe that the phenomena existed, but had no relation to the deceased.

People say that spirits are the souls of dead men. That being the case, spirits should always appear naked, for surely it is not contended that clothes have souls as well as men. (Lunheng)

The Swedish linguist and sinologist Bernhard Karlgren called his style straightforward and without literary pretensions; in general, modern Western writers have noted that Wang was one of the most original thinkers of his time, even iconoclastic in his opinions. They note that he gained popularity in the early 20th century because his ideas correspond to those that later evolved in Europe. His writing is praised for being clear and well ordered. But, because there was no functioning scientific method or larger scientific discourse in his time, his formulations can seem alien to the modern eye—to some readers, even as peculiar as the superstitions that he was rejecting. But despite this barrier to his work, he gained some fame, though mostly after his death. He had an effect on what Karlgren called 'neo-Daoism': a reformed Daoist philosophy with a more rational, naturalistic metaphysics, without much of the superstition and mysticism into which Daoism had fallen.

== Early scientific thought ==
=== Meteorology ===
With his acute rationale and objective approach, Wang Chong wrote many things that would be praised by later modern sinologists and scientists alike as being modern-minded. For example, much like Greek polymath Aristotle's 4th century BC Meteorology portrayed the water cycle, Wang Chong wrote the following passage about clouds and rain:

The Confucians also maintain that the expression that the rain comes down from heaven means that it actually does fall from the heavens (where the stars are). However, consideration of the subject shows us that rain comes from above the earth, but not down from heaven.

Seeing the rain gather from above, people say that it comes from the heavens—admittedly it comes from above the earth. How can we demonstrate that the rain originates in the earth and rises from the mountains? Gongyang Gao's [i.e. Gongyang Zhuan] commentary on the Spring and Autumn Annals says; "It evaporates upwards through stones one or two inches thick, and gathers. In one day's time it can spread over the whole empire, but this is only so if it comes from Thai Shan." What he means is that from Mount Tai rain clouds can spread all over the empire, but from small mountains only over a single province—the distance depends on the height. As to this coming of rain from the mountains, some hold that the clouds carry the rain with them, dispersing as it is precipitated (and they are right). Clouds and rain are really the same thing. Water evaporating upwards becomes clouds, which condense into rain, or still further into dew. When the garments (of those travelling on high mountain passes) are moistened, it is not the effect of the clouds and mists they pass through, but of the suspended rain water.

Some persons cite the Shujing, which says, "When the moon follows the stars, there will be wind and rain," or the Shijing, which says, "The approach of the moon to Pi hsiu [the Hyades] will bring heavy rain showers." They believe that according to these two passages of the classics, heaven itself causes the rain. What are we to say to this?

When the rain comes from the mountains, the moon passes the (other) stars and approaches Pi hsiu. When it approaches Pi hsiu there must be rain. As long as it does not rain, the moon has not approached, and the mountains have no clouds. Heaven and earth, above and below, act in mutual resonance. When the moon approaches above, the mountains steam below, and the embodied qi meet and unite. This is (part of the) spontaneous Tao of Nature. Clouds and fog show that rain is coming. In summer it turns to dew, in winter to frost. Warm, it is rain, cold, it is snow. Rain, dew, and frost, all proceed from the earth, and do not descend from the heavens.

Wang's reference to Gongyan Gao's (i.e. Gongyan Zhuan's) commentary perhaps demonstrates that Gongyan's work, compiled in the 2nd century BC, explored the topic of the hydrological cycle long before Wang wrote about the process. The British biochemist, historian, and sinologist Joseph Needham asserts that: "As to the seasonal lunar and stellar connections, the thought of Wang Chong (about 83 AD) is that in some way or other the cyclical behavior of the qi on earth, where water is distilled into mountain clouds, is correlated with the behavior of the qi in the heavens, which brings the moon near to the Hyades at certain times." Thus, Wang Chong was uniting classical Chinese thought with radically modern ways of scientific thinking in his day.

=== Astronomy ===
Similar to Han dynasty polymath contemporary Zhang Heng (78–139) and Chinese scholars before him, Wang discussed theories about the causation of eclipses, with solar eclipse and lunar eclipse. However, Wang Chong's theory went against the correct 'radiating influence' theory supported by Zhang Heng (that the light of the rounded Moon was simply a reflection of the light emanating from the rounded Sun). Writing little more than a century before Zhang Heng, the mathematician and music theorist Jing Fang (78–37 BC) wrote in the 1st century BC:

The moon and the planets are Yin; they have shape but no light. This they receive only when the sun illuminates them. The former masters regarded the sun as round like a crossbow bullet, and they thought the moon had the nature of a mirror. Some of them recognized the moon as a ball too. Those parts of the moon the sun illuminates look bright, those parts it does not, remain dark.

Zhang Heng wrote in his Ling Xian (Mystical Laws) of 120 AD:

The sun is like fire and the moon like water. The fire gives out light and the water reflects it. Thus the moon's brightness is produced from the radiance of the sun, and the moon's darkness is due to (the light of) the sun being obstructed. The side that faces the sun is fully lit, and the side that is away from it is dark. The planets (as well as the moon) have the nature of water and reflect light. The light pouring forth from the sun does not always reach the moon owing to the obstruction of the earth itself—this is called 'anxu', a lunar eclipse. When (a similar effect) happens with a planet (we call it) an occultation (xingwei); when the moon passes across (the sun's path) then there is a solar eclipse (shi).

Going against the grain of the accepted theory, and thinking more along the lines of the 1st century BC Roman philosopher Lucretius, Wang Chong wrote:

According to the scholars, solar eclipses are brought about by the moon. It has been observed that they occur at times of new moon (lit. on the last days and first days of months), when the moon is in conjunction with the sun, and therefore the moon can eclipse it. In the Spring and Autumn period there were many eclipses, and the Chun Qiu says that at such and such a month at new moon there was an eclipse of the sun, but these statements do not imply that the moon did it. Why should (the chroniclers) have made no mention of the moon if they knew that it was really responsible?

Now in such an abnormal event the Yang would have to be weak and the Yin strong, but (this is not in accord with) what happens on earth, where the stronger subdue the weaker. The situation is that at the ends of the months the light of the moon is very weak, and at the beginnings almost extinct; how then could it conquer the sun? If you say that eclipses of the sun are due to the moon consuming it, then what is it that consumes (in a lunar eclipse) the moon? Nothing, the moon fades of itself. Applying the same principle to the sun, the sun also fades of itself.

Roughly speaking, every 41 or 42 months there is a solar eclipse, and every 180 days there is a lunar eclipse. The reason why the eclipses have definite times is not (as the scholars say) that there are (recurring) abnormal events due to the periods (of the moon's cycle), but because it is the nature of the qi (of the sun) to change (at those times). Why should it be said that the moon has anything to do with the times of (changing of) the sun('s qi) at the first and last days of the months? The sun should normally be full; if there is a shrinkage it is an abnormal event (and the scholars say that) there must be something consuming (the sun). But in such cases as landslides and earthquakes, what does the consuming then?

Other scholars say that when the sun is eclipsed, the moon covers it. The sun is further away (lit. above) but the moon being nearer (lit. below), then the moon could not cover the sun. But since the opposite is true, the sun is obstructed, its light is covered by that of the moon, and therefore a solar eclipse is caused. Just as, in gloomy weather, neither sun nor moon can be seen. When the edges contact, the two consume each other; when the two are concentric they face each other exactly covered and the sun is nearly extinguished. That the sun and moon are in conjunction at times of new moon is simply one of the regulatories of the heavens.

But that the moon covers the light of the sun in solar eclipses—no, that is not true. How can this be verified? When the sun and the moon are in conjunction and the light of the former is 'covered' by the latter, the edges of the two must meet at the beginning, and when the light reappears they must have changed places. Suppose the sun is in the east and the moon is in the west. The moon falls back (lit. moves) quickly eastwards and meets the sun, 'covering' its edge. Soon the moon going on eastwards passes the sun. When the western edge (of the sun), which has been 'covered' first, shines again with its light, the eastern edge, which was not 'covered' before, should (now) be 'covered'. But in fact we see that during an eclipse of the sun the light of the western edge is extinguished, yet when (the light) comes back the western edge is bright (but the eastern edge is bright also). The moon goes on and covers the eastern (inner) part as well as the western (inner) part. This is called 'exact intrustion' and 'mutual covering and obscuring'. How can these facts be explained (by astronomers who believe that the moon covers the light of the sun in solar eclipse).

Again, the scholars assert that the bodies of the sun and moon are quite spherical. When one looks up at them, their shape seems like that of a ladle or a round basket, perfectly circular. They are not the qi of a light seen from far off, for qi could not be round. But (my opinion is) that in fact the sun and moon are not spherical; they only appear to be so on account of the distance. How can this be verified? The sun is the essence of fire, the moon the essence of water. On earth, fire and water never assume spherical forms, so why should they become spherical only in the heavens? The sun and moon are like the five planets, and these in turn like the other stars. Now the other stars are not really round, but only appear to be so in their shining, because they are so far away. How do we know this? In the Spring and Autumn period, stars fell down (upon the earth) at the capital of the State of Song. When people went near to examine them, it turned out that they were stones, but not round. Since these (shooting) stars were not round, we may be sure that the sun, the moon, and the planets are not spherical either.

Although Wang Chong was certain of his ideas about eclipses (without the knowledge of how gravity forms naturally large spherical bodies in space), his ideas on this would not be later accepted in China. Although there were some figures like Liu Chi, writing in his Lun Tian (Discourse on the Heavens) of 274 AD that supported Wang's theory by arguing the inferior Yin (Moon) could never obstruct the superior Yang (Sun), Liu was still outside of the mainstream accepted Confucian tradition. The Song dynasty (960–1279) polymathic scientist Shen Kuo (1031–1095) supported the old theory of a spherical Sun and Moon by using his own reasoning about eclipses, which he explained were due to the Moon and the Sun coming into obstruction of one another. The Song dynasty Chinese philosopher Zhu Xi (1130–1200) also supported this theory in his writing. Although Wang Chong was right about the water cycle and other aspects of early science, his stern opposition to mainstream Confucian thought at the time made him a skeptic of all their theories, including eclipses (the Confucian-accepted model being correct).

== See also ==
- Chinese philosophy
- Yigupai
- Wang Chung
- Age of Enlightenment
