= Rational expression =

Rational expression may refer to:

- A mathematical expression that may be rewritten to a rational fraction, an algebraic fraction such that both the numerator and the denominator are polynomials.
- A regular expression, also known as rational expression, used in formal language theory (computer science)

== See also ==
- rational number
- rational (disambiguation)
