= Dennis (album) =

Studio album by Sega Bodega
- Released: 26 April 2024
- Length: 37:59
- Label: Ambient Tweets

Sega Bodega chronology
Romeo (2021)	Dennis (2024)	I Created the Universe so That Life Could Create a Language so Complex, Just to Say How Much I Love You (2025)

Singles from Dennis
- 1. "Kepko" Released: 9 November 2022; 2. "Deer Teeth" Released: 29 January 2024; 3. "Set Me Free, I'm an Animal" Released: 26 February 2024; 4. "Elk Skin" Released: 25 March 2024; 5. "True" Released: 22 April 2024

Dennis is the third studio album Irish-Scottish music producer and musician Sega Bodega. It was released on 26 April 2024 via his own Ambient Tweets label and Supernature.

The album explores the feeling of being asleep, and a sense of disorientation surrounding uncertainty. Sega Bodega also chose the title based on a theory of collective consciousness, directly referencing the coincidence of the UK and US 'Dennis the Menace' comics premiering on print on the same day in 1951. The title is also an anadrome for "sinned".

It was supported by the singles "Kepko", "Deer Teeth", "Set Me Free, I'm an Animal", "Elk Skin", and "True".

The album art, and its respective singles and promotional art, were shot by Aidan Zamiri.

== Track listing ==
All tracks written and produced by Sega Bodega.

Dennis track listing
No.	Title	Length
1.	"Coma Dennis"	0:53
2.	"Adulter8"	3:08
3.	"Elk Skin"	2:52
4.	"Kepko"	3:12
5.	"Dirt"	4:16
6.	"Set Me Free, I'm an Animal"	3:36
7.	"Deer Teeth"	3:51
8.	"True"	3:55
9.	"Tears & Sighs"	4:00
10.	"Humiliation Doesn't Leave a Mark"	3:43
11.	"Coma Salv"	4:33
Total length:		37:59

== Personnel ==
- Sega Bodega – vocals, writing, production
- Miranda July – additional vocals ("Coma Dennis", "Dirt", "Humiliation Doesn't Leave a Mark")
- Kirin J Callinan – additional vocals ("Adulter8"), grunts ("True")
- Cecile Believe – additional writing ("Elk Skin"), additional vocals ("Elk Skin")
- Mayah Alkhateri – additional vocals ("Elk Skin", "Dirt", "Deer Teeth", "Humiliation Doesn't Leave a Mark")
- BEA1991 – additional vocals ("Dirt")
- Rick Farin – somniloquy ("Dirt", "Humiliation Doesn't Leave a Mark")
- Sammy – additional production ("Deer Teeth")
- Lafawndah – additional vocals ("True")
- Amy Langley – additional strings ("Humiliation Doesn't Leave a Mark")
- James Rand – mixing
- Heba Kadry – mastering
