= Rationalization =

Rationalization may refer to:

- Rationalization (economics), an attempt to change an ad hoc workflow into one based on published rules; also, jargon for a reduction in staff
- Rationalisation (mathematics), the process of removing a square root or imaginary number from the denominator of a fraction
- Rationalization (psychology), a psychological defense mechanism in which perceived controversial behaviors are logically justified also known as "making excuses"
  - Post-purchase rationalization, a tendency to retroactively ascribe positive attributes to an option one has selected
- Rationalization (sociology), the replacement of traditions, values, and emotions as motives for behavior in society with rational motives
- Rationalization, appropriate placement of a factor such as was done with 4π for Heaviside–Lorentz units

== See also ==
- Rational (disambiguation)
- Rationale (disambiguation)
- Rationalism (disambiguation)
- Rationality
