= I Created the Universe so That Life Could Create a Language so Complex, Just to Say How Much I Love You =

Studio album by Sega Bodega
- Released: November 28, 2025
- Recorded: 2019–2025
- Genre: Ambient
- Length: 45:57
- Label: ambient tweets
- Producer: Sega Bodega

Sega Bodega chronology
Dennis (2024)	I Created the Universe so That Life Could Create a Language so Complex, Just to Say How Much I Love You (2025)

Singles from I Created the Universe so That Life Could Create a Language so Complex, Just to Say How Much I Love You
- 1. "Pipe" Released: November 24, 2025; 2. "Cradle / Tab Laih" Released: November 28, 2025; 3. "mmMMmmmmm / The World Around Me Is Working Against My Memory" Released: November 28, 2025

I Created the Universe so That Life Could Create a Language so Complex, Just to Say How Much I Love You is the fourth studio album by Irish-Scottish musician Sega Bodega. It was released on November 28, 2025, by Ambient Tweets. It is the sequel of his previous studio album, Dennis (2024).

== Background ==
On November 16, 2025, Sega Bodega on his account on Instagram, has announced that he created an ambient album and that the album will be played in Bourse de commerce on November 19, 2025. On November 24, 2025, he released "Pipe" with Vashti Bunyan, and he revealed a track listing.

I Created the Universe so That Life Could Create a Language so Complex, Just to Say How Much I Love You was released on November 28, 2025.

== Track listing ==
I Created the Universe so That Life Could Create a Language so Complex, Just to Say How Much I Love You track listing
No.	Title	Length
1.	"Pipe" (with Vashti Bunyan)	3:10
2.	"Y Tu Mamá Ambient"	4:34
3.	"Cradle" (with Mayah Alkhateri)	4:50
4.	"mmMMmmmm" (with Lucinda Chua)	4:18
5.	"I Created the Universe so That Life Could Create a Language so Complex, Just to Say How Much I Love You"	4:29
6.	"Crystal Loop"	5:04
7.	"Gamahuche"	3:00
8.	"Tab Laih" (with Mayah Alkhateri)	3:57
9.	"1500 - 1880k"	3:50
10.	"The World Around Me Is Working Against My Memory" (with Lucinda Chua)	3:22
11.	"True" (Pure Mix)	5:23
Total length:		45:57
