= Flohio =

British hip-hop artist

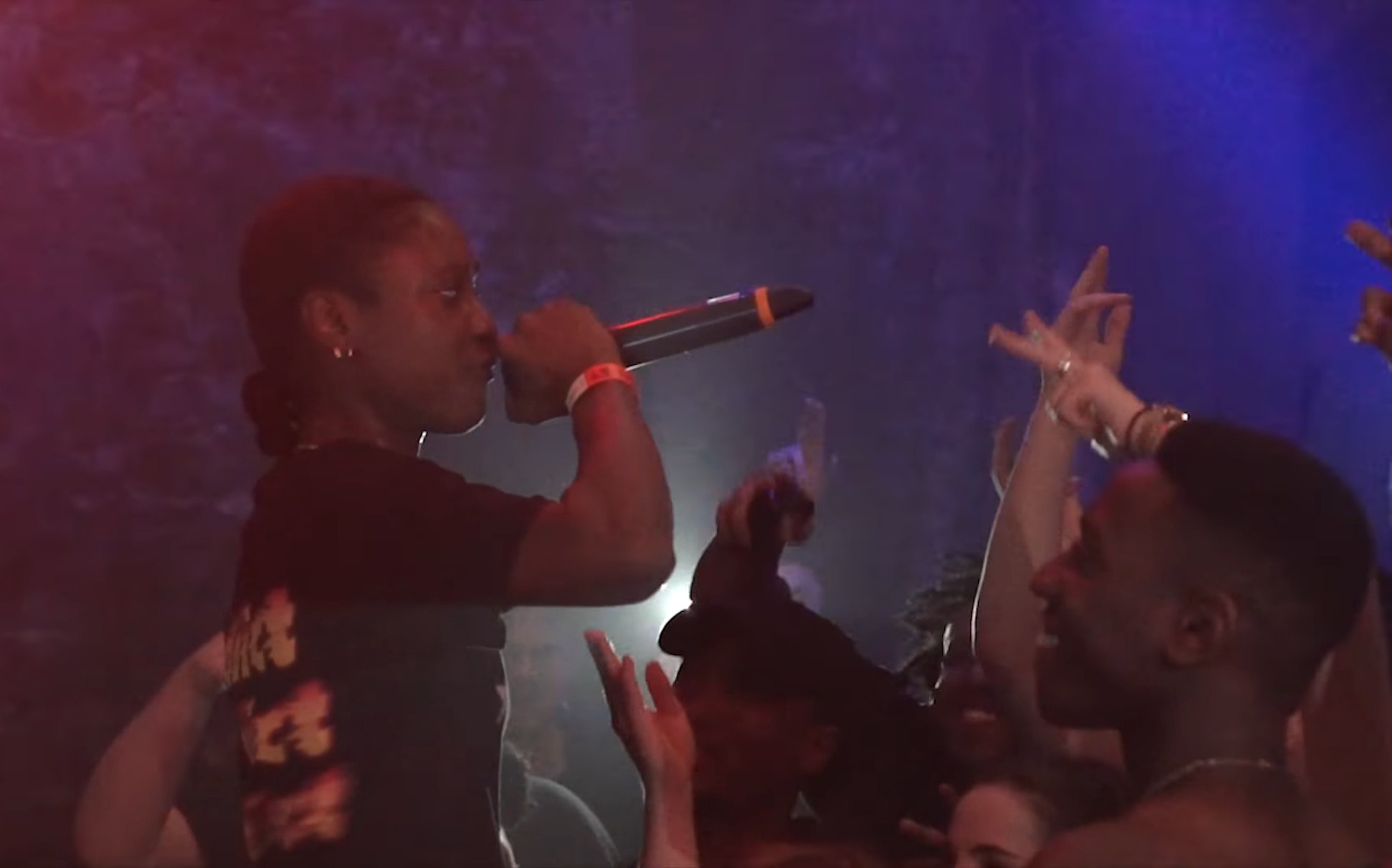
- Flohio (2018)

Background information
- Born: Funmi Ohiosumah; Lagos, Nigeria
- Genres: Hip hop
- Years active: 2016–present
- Website: www.flohio.uk

Funmi Ohiosumah, known professionally as Flohio (stylised as FLOHIO), is a Nigerian-born British rapper based in South London. Her music is characterised by unusual beats, expansive themes, genre fluidity, and periodic double-time flows. Though some have characterised her work as "grime," Ohiosumah rejects this term as too limiting for her style and approach. As FLOHIO, she performs as a solo artist, but has also collaborated with God Colony and Modeselektor.

Born in Lagos, Nigeria, her family immigrated to Bermondsey, South East London when Ohiosumah was nine. Her first EP, titled Nowhere Near, debuted in 2016, followed by her second EP Wild Yout (2018), and her debut mixtape No Panic No Pain (2020). Ohiosumah released her debut album, Out of Heart, on 7 October 2022.

FLOHIO has described some of her early influences to include Channel U, Eve and Lil Wayne.

== Discography ==
Studio albums

- Out of Heart (2022)

Mixtapes

- No Panic No Pain (2020)

Extended plays

- Nowhere Near (2016)
- Wild Yout (2018)
