= Dylan (musician) =

English singer-songwriter

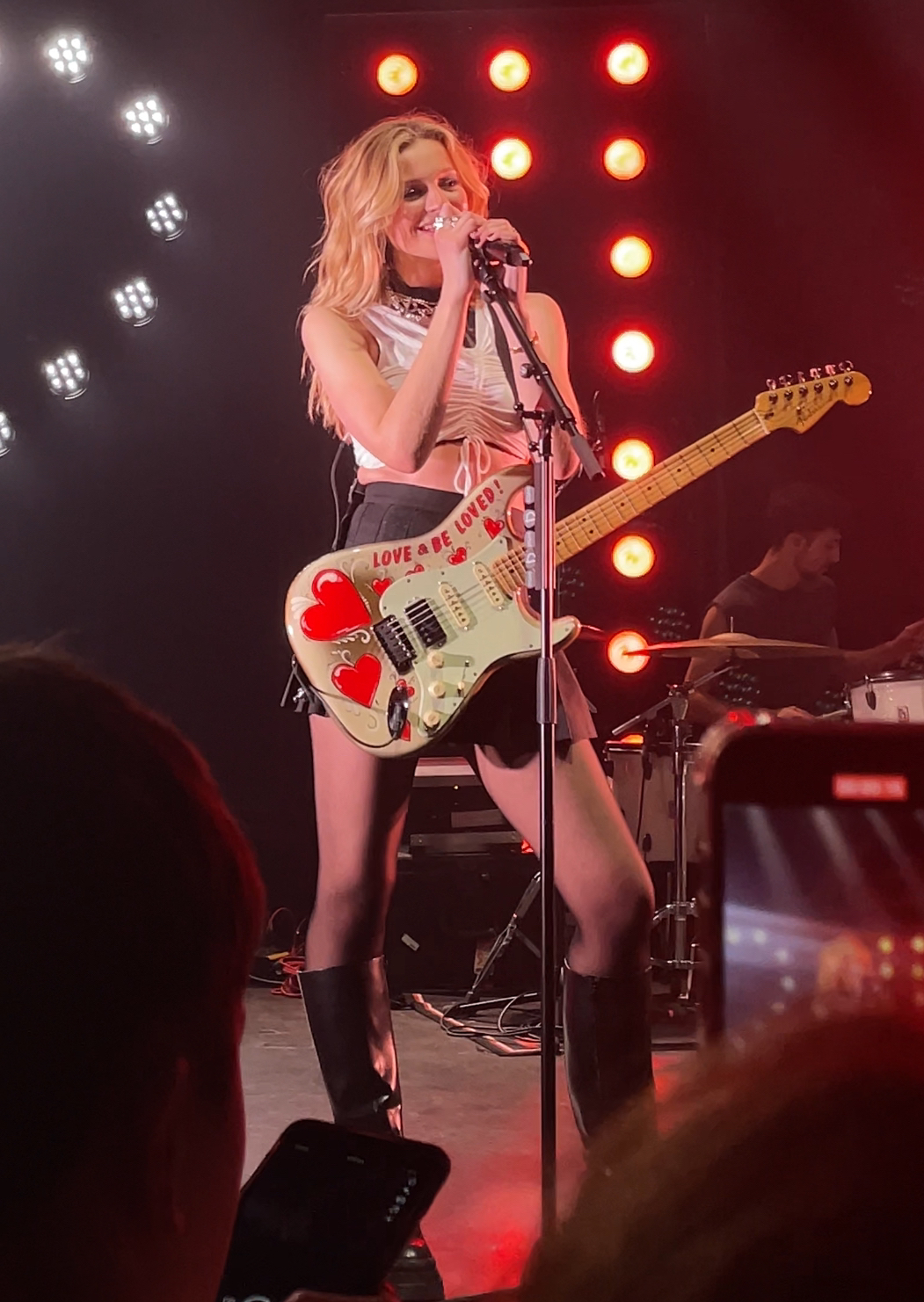
- Dylan performing in London, 2023

Background information
- Born: Natasha Katherine Woods; 25 October 1999 (age 27); Bures, England
- Genres: Pop; electro-pop
- Occupations: Singer; songwriter
- Instruments: Vocals; guitar
- Years active: 2019–present
- Label: Island
- Website: www.iamdylanofficial.com

Natasha Katherine Woods (born 25 October 1999), known professionally as Dylan (stylised in all caps), is an English musician, singer and songwriter. She signed to Island Records in 2022 and released her debut mixtape The Greatest Thing I'll Never Learn in October 2022, which peaked at No. 19 on the UK Albums Chart.

== Early life ==
Woods was born to parents Lorna (née Maxwell) and Robert and grew up in the village of Bures on the Essex–Suffolk border. She started playing music from a young age, learning the guitar from the age of 10. She was diagnosed with Irlen syndrome as a child, after struggling at school with reading. She attended Stowe School, where she was a member of Queen's. Woods learned to play piano and guitar by ear, and began to write songs. With help from her music teacher Ben Weston, Woods sent some of her music to producer Will Hicks, who took an interest in her work.

== Career ==
Dylan released her debut EP named Purple in October 2019. It included debut single "Bad Bitches Beat Heartbreak" and second single "Sour Milk" to which Dylan said "'Sour Milk' is about the push and pull of a relationship; not wanting someone when they're around but craving them when they're distant. I tend to find stupid reasons to call it quits with someone, and then immediately regret it when they leave; it's a constant rollercoaster of feelings and not knowing what you want…"

Purple was followed by two further EPs, Red in 2020 and No Romeo in 2022. Speaking about the title track, Dylan said, "I wrote 'No Romeo' with my best friends in mind. I was tired of them going back to their questionable exes and letting themselves be treated like crap (although I think I needed the song as much as they did!) and wanted, as always, to write something empowering. The aim was to write an anthem for the late-night drives with the windows down, the shouting at the sea because life and the screaming crying throwing up heartbreak moments."

In mid-2022, Dylan supported Ed Sheeran on his +–=÷× Tour. and was signed to Island Records.

On 28 October 2022, Dylan released the mixtape, The Greatest Thing I'll Never Learn. Dylan was named as Deezer's 'focus artist' shortly after. In December 2022, Dylan was also announced by BBC Radio 1 as a nominee of the Sound of 2023 longlist.

On 4 August 2023, she released the single "Liar Liar" with Bastille lead singer Dan Smith.

== Discography ==
=== Mixtapes ===
List of mixtapes, with selected chart positions
Title	Album details	Peak chart positions
Title	Album details	UK
The Greatest Thing I'll Never Learn	Released: 28 October 2022; Format: CD, cassette, digital, LP; Label: Island Records	19

=== Extended plays ===
List of EPs, with selected details
Title	Details
Purple	Released: 25 October 2019; Format: Digital; Label: Khaos Records
Red	Released: 29 May 2020; Format: Digital; Label: Who Is Dylan
No Romeo	Released: 8 April 2022; Format: Digital; Label: Who Is Dylan, AWAL

=== Singles ===
List of singles, with selected details
Title	Year	Peak chart positions	Album
Title	Year	NZ Hot	Album
"Bad Bitches Beat Heartbreak"	2019	—	Purple
"Sour Milk"	2019	—	Purple
"Your Issues"	2020	—	Red
"Wish You Weren't Mine"	2020	—	Red
"Nineteen"	2021	—	No Romeo
"Someone Else"	2021	—	No Romeo
"You're Not Harry Styles"	2021	—	No Romeo
"No Romeo"	2022	—	No Romeo
"Girl of Your Dreams"	2022	—	The Greatest Thing I'll Never Learn
"Nothing Lasts Forever"	2022	—	The Greatest Thing I'll Never Learn
"Blue"	2022	—	The Greatest Thing I'll Never Learn
"Blisters"	2022	—	The Greatest Thing I'll Never Learn
"Every Heart But Mine"	2023	—	The Greatest Thing I'll Never Learn
"Liar Liar" (featuring Bastille)	2023	—	Non-album singles
"Rebel Child"	2023	—	Non-album singles
"The Alibi"	2024	—	Non-album singles
"Perfect Revenge"	2024	—	Non-album singles
"Bad"	2025	—	Non-album singles
"To Love and To Lose"	2026	29	TBA
"Grief and All His Friends"	2026	—	TBA

== Tours ==
=== Headlining ===
- The Greatest Thing I'll Never Learn Tour (2023; seventeen shows)
- The Rebel Child Tour (2023)

=== Supporting ===
- Griff - One Foot In Front Of The Other Tour (2021)
- Bastille - Give Me the Future Tour (2022; nine shows)
- Tate McRae - Europe Tour 2022 (2022; fifteen shows)
- Ed Sheeran - +–=÷x Tour (2022; twenty-six shows)
- Gayle - Scared But Trying Tour (2023, fifteen shows)

== Awards ==
=== Lists ===
Publisher	Listicle	Year (Note: Indicates the year of ceremony. Each year is linked to the article about the awards held that year, wherever possible.)	Recipient(s)	Result	Ref.
NME	"The 20 best mixtapes and EPs of 2022"	2022	"The Greatest Thing I'll Never Learn"	Placed	
Official Charts Company	"Official Charts' Artists To Watch 2023"	2022	Dylan	Placed	
