= Rationalism (disambiguation) =

Rationalism is a philosophical position, theory, or view that reason is the source of knowledge.

Rationalism may also refer to:

- Rationalism (architecture), a term applied to a number of architectural movements
- Rationalism (international relations), a political perspective on the international system
- Rationalism (theology), philosophical Rationalism applied in theology
- Critical rationalism, an epistemological philosophy advanced by Karl Raimund Popper
- Economic rationalism, an Australian term in discussion of microeconomic policy
- Pancritical rationalism, a theory by William Warren Bartley developed from panrationalism and critical rationalism

== See also ==
- Rational (disambiguation)
- Rationale (disambiguation)
- Rationality
- Rationalization (disambiguation)
- Rationalist community
- Rationalist Association
- Rationalist Society of Australia
