= Zebra Katz =

Jamaican-American rapper

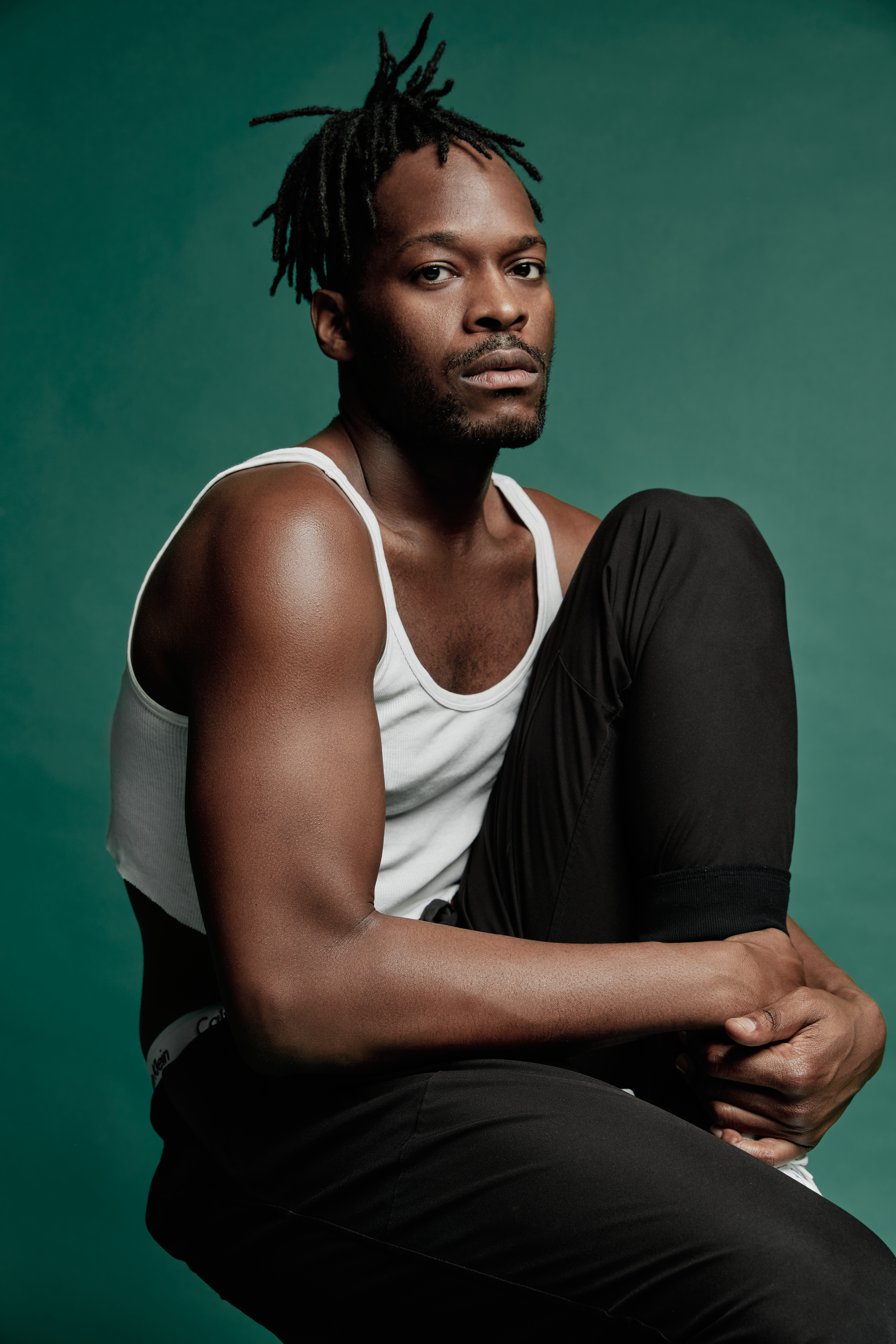
- Zebra Katz in 2019

Background information
- Born: Ojay Morgan; 1987 (age 38–39); West Palm Beach, Florida, U.S.
- Genres: Hip hop; electronic; dark wave
- Occupations: Rapper; producer; songwriter
- Years active: 2012–present
- Labels: Mad Decent; The Vinyl Factory; ZFK Records
- Website: zebrakatz.com

Ojay Morgan (born 1987), better known as Zebra Katz, is a Berlin-based Jamaican-American rapper, producer and songwriter who has collaborated with artists including Busta Rhymes and Gorillaz. Fashion designer Rick Owens featured Zebra Katz's song "Ima Read" at his show at Paris Fashion Week in 2012. Morgan identifies as queer.

== Musical style ==
Throughout his career, Morgan has openly spoken out against the "queer rap" genre coined by Pitchfork and other publications used to classify Zebra Katz, and artists like Mykki Blanco and Le1f, while stating that if it weren't for his sexuality, he'd be generally classified as a "rapper".

== "Ima Read" ==
Despite not having a strong personal relationship with voguing, Morgan says the movement was pushed onto him as a means for creating context for "Ima Read". The connection between voguing and the track was fueled by the 20th anniversary of the ballroom scene documentary film Paris is Burning and popularization of voguing in 2012. That said, Morgan loves ballroom culture/voguing. He performed at the 2012 GMHC House of Latex Ball, supports House of Vogue founder, DJ MikeQ, and is a forming member of the House of Ladosha.

== Less Is Moor ==
While studying at New School's Eugene Lang College of Liberal Arts, Morgan conceived the foundation for Less Is Moor. His senior thesis project, "Moor Contradictions", was a performance featuring monologues and raps, including "Ima Read", from different personas created by Morgan. Among these characters is Zebra Katz, who Morgan says, was formed as a result of his thesis on identity obsession. Since then, Morgan has been fighting against the various boxes and typecasts created by those around him.

The title of the album is inspired by the Moor people. Zebra Katz's debut album, Less Is Moor, released in 2020, pays tribute to the minimalistic approach frequently imposed upon artists of color, inspired by the likes of James Baldwin, Grace Jones, Nina Simone, and Little Richard, the artist behind Zebra Katz, explains that non-white artists are often required to be more resourceful than their white counterparts. Less Is Moor combines elements of hip-hop, drum 'n' bass, and electronic music to showcase Katz's acerbic lyricism through its biting rhythms.

== Discography ==
=== Studio albums ===
Less Is Moor (2020)
No.	Title	Writer(s)	Producer(s)	Length
1.	"Intro to Less"	Zebra Katz; Jonathan Baruc	Zebra Katz; Death Qualia	2:22
2.	"Ish"	Zebra Katz; Salvador Navarrete	Zebra Katz; Sega Bodega	3:29
3.	"Lousy"	Zebra Katz; Lasse Martinussen	Zebra Katz; La Martinus	2:46
4.	"Blush"	Zebra Katz; Navarrete	Zebra Katz; Sega Bodega	2:11
5.	"In in In"	Zebra Katz; Anthony Quattro	Zebra Katz; Tony Quattro	3:18
6.	"Zad Drumz"	Zebra Katz; Joeri Woudstra; Daniel Trachtenberg	Zebra Katz; Torus; Br83the	2:59
7.	"Monitor" (featuring S Ruston)	Zebra Katz; Troels Baunbæk-Knudsen; Sophie Ruston	Zebra Katz; Ctrls	1:40
8.	"Moor"	Zebra Katz; Navarrete; Michael Carr	Zebra Katz; Walter Gross; Sega Bodega	2:24
9.	"Necklace"	Zebra Katz; Martinussen	Zebra Katz; La Martinus	1:55
10.	"Sleepn"	Zebra Katz; Navarrete	Zebra Katz; Sega Bodega	3:17
11.	"No 1 Else"	Zebra Katz; Tom Parker	Zebra Katz; Count Baldor	2:17
12.	"Upp"	Zebra Katz; Woudstra; Trachtenberg	Zebra Katz; Torus; Br83the	3:13
13.	"Been Known"	Zebra Katz; Joachim Piehl; Jonas Nikolaus Lang; Martin Peter Wiloumeit	Zebra Katz; Jugglerz	2:28
14.	"Lick It N Split" (featuring Shygirl)	Zebra Katz; Blane Muise; Navarrete	Zebra Katz; Sega Bodega	3:00
15.	"Exit 2 Void"	Zebra Katz; Mike Chunusoff	Zebra Katz; Mike Dextro	1:43

Notes

- All track titles are stylized in all uppercase letters.

=== Mixtapes ===
- Champagne (2012)
- Drklng (2013)

=== EPs ===
- Winter Titty (2012) (with Boyfriend)
- Tear the House Up: Remixes (2014) (with Hervé)
- 1 Bad Bitch: Remixes (2014) (with Ten Ven + Ripley)
- Nu Renegade (2015) (with Leila)

=== Singles ===
- "Ima Read" (2013)
- "Tear the House Up" (2014) (with Hervé)
- "Hello Hi" (2016)
- "Blk & Wht" (2017)
- "In In In" (2019)
- "Lousy" (2019)
- "Ish" (2020)
- "Upp" (2020)

=== Guest appearances ===
- Tanika – "Thoughts of Love" from Thoughts of Love (2013)
- Kura – "Our Sun" from Our Sun (2015)
- Gorillaz – "Sex Murder Party", "The Apprentice", and "Out of Body" from Humanz (2017)

== Nominations ==
- Berlin Music Video Awards, Most Bizarre for 'BLK DIAMOND'
