= The Greatest Thing I'll Never Learn =

Mixtape by Dylan
- Released: 28 October 2022
- Label: Island Records
- Producer: Jake Gosling; King Ed; Martin Sjølie; Henrik Michelsen

Dylan chronology
No Romeo (2022)	The Greatest Thing I'll Never Learn (2022)

Singles from The Greatest Thing I'll Never Learn
- 1. "Girl of Your Dreams" Released: 13 July 2022; 2. "Nothing Lasts Forever" Released: 15 September 2022; 3. "Blue" Released: 14 October 2022; 4. "Blisters" Released: 28 October 2022

Singles from The Greatest Thing I'll Never Learn (Live / Deluxe Edition)
- 1. "Every Heart But Mine" Released: 17 February 2023

The Greatest Thing I'll Never Learn is the debut mixtape by English musician Dylan, released on 28 October 2022, peaking at number 19 on the British charts. Dylan said the mixtape delves into her experiences of "learning to love and be loved", saying: "How does anyone love and be loved? It's cringy, but the songs are so un-cringy that it's very easy to take in without icking myself out. But I feel like I'm writing a soundtrack to my life. This is my movie soundtrack."

The mixtape was re-released on 24 February 2023 featuring a new song and 7 live recordings from her October 2022 performance at London's KOKO theatre.

== Reception ==
Professional ratings
Review scores
Source	Rating
The Guardian	4/5 stars
NME	4/5 stars
Dork	4/5 stars

Michael Craig from The Guardian said "[Dylan] turns failed relationships into messy anthems, often dismissing no-mark exes, or clamouring for emotional parity, over stadium-sized, pop-punk tornados. She also explores that tricky grey area just as things start to fall apart, giving songs such as the thundering Lovestruck an extra dose of disillusionment."

Sophie Williams from NME said "[The EP] is a collection of neon-pink power pop that teases heavier influences, and maintains both tight riffs and a confident snarl. If this sounds like a lot to swallow, then you're absolutely right: it's a crowded but self-assured record – but Dylan has learned that by going for the big feelings, she inspires near-rapturous devotion."

Finlay Holden from Dork said "Self-aware, satirical and snappy tunes twist Dylan's trauma into catharsis as she successfully packs a punch into every track – whether it's the acceptance of 'Nothing Lasts Forever' or the striking loneliness of 'Home Is Where the Heart Is', it's hard to listen through and not picture yourself with a fist in the air at one of the many arenas the London-via-Suffolk singer has dominated this year alone."

Ellie Boyle from The Independent said "Dylan has found the perfect blend of pop-punk and songwriting on her debut mixtape." Boyle continued "The mixtape has themes of heartache, self-worth, and always looking at the glass half full even when there doesn't seem to be a light at the end of the tunnel."

== Track listing ==
Standard edition
No.	Title	Writer(s)	Length
1.	"Girl of Your Dreams"	Dylan; Tinashé Fazakerley; Jake Gosling	2:43
2.	"Nothing Lasts Forever"	Dylan; Martin Luke Brown; Edward James Carlile	2:47
3.	"Blue"	Dylan; Carlile; Anya Jones	3:16
4.	"Love Struck"	Dylan; Jones; Martin Sjølie	3:01
5.	"Blisters"	Dylan; Sarah Boe; Henrik Michelsen	3:21
6.	"Treat You Bad"	Dylan; Carlile; Fazakerley	2:52
7.	"The Greatest Thing"	Dylan; Sjølie	3:17
8.	"Home Is Where The Heart Is"	Dylan; Fazakerley; Gosling	2:47

Live / deluxe edition
No.	Title	Writer(s)	Length
9.	"Every Heart But Mine"		3:16
10.	"Girl of Your Dreams" (live at Koko, London)	Dylan; Fazakerley; Gosling	2:47
11.	"Nothing Lasts Forever" (live at Koko, London)	Dylan; Brown; Carlile	3:16
12.	"Blue" (live at Koko, London)	Dylan; Carlile; Anya Jones	3:01
13.	"No Romeo" (live at Koko, London)		3:21
14.	"Someone Else" (live at Koko, London)		2:52
15.	"You’re Not Harry Styles" (live at Koko, London)		3:17
16.	"Nineteen" (live at Koko, London)		2:47

== Charts ==
Weekly chart performance for The Greatest Thing I'll Never Learn
Chart (2022)	Peak position
UK Albums (OCC)	19
