= Rationale (Rationale album) =

Studio album by Rationale
- Released: 13 October 2017
- Length: 40:59
- Label: Warner
- Producer: Rationale; Mark Crew; Braque; Mark Ralph; ST!NT; Simon Aldred

Rationale chronology
Saved (2010)	Rationale (2017)

Professional ratings
Aggregate scores
Source	Rating
Metacritic	72/100
Review scores
Source	Rating
Clash	7/10
Mixmag	8/10
The Guardian	3/5 stars

Rationale is the self-titled debut studio album by Zimbabwe-born British singer-songwriter Rationale. It was released on 13 October 2017 through Warner Music UK.

== Track listing ==
Rationale track listing
No.	Title	Writer(s)	Producer(s)	Length
1.	"Re.Up"	Tinashe Fazakerley; Zena Kitt	Rationale	3:11
2.	"Oil and Water"	Fazakerley	Rationale	3:31
3.	"Loving Life"	Fazakerley	Rationale; Mark Ralph^{[b]}	3:16
4.	"Fast Lane"	Fazakerley	Rationale	2:35
5.	"Prodigal Son"	Fazakerley	Rationale; Mark Crew^{[b]}; Braque^{[b]}	3:41
6.	"Losing Sleep"	Fazakerley; Mark Crew; Daniel Priddy	Rationale; Crew^{[b]}; Braque^{[b]}	3:30
7.	"Into the Blue"	Fazakerley; Emily Schwartz; Daniel Smith; Crew; Priddy	Rationale; Crew^{[a]}; Braque^{[a]}	3:21
8.	"Fuel to the Fire"	Fazakerley	Rationale	3:31
9.	"Phenomenal"	Fazakerley	Rationale	3:23
10.	"Deliverance"	Fazakerley	Rationale; Crew^{[b]}; Braque^{[b]}	3:39
11.	"Tumbling Down"	Fazakerley; John Hill; Ajay Bhattacharya; Daniel Parker	ST!NT	3:03
12.	"Somewhere to Belong"	Fazakerley; Simon Aldred	Aldred	4:18

== Charts ==
Chart performance for Rationale
Chart (2017)	Peak position
UK Albums (OCC)	82
