= Coucou Chloe =

French music producer, singer and DJ

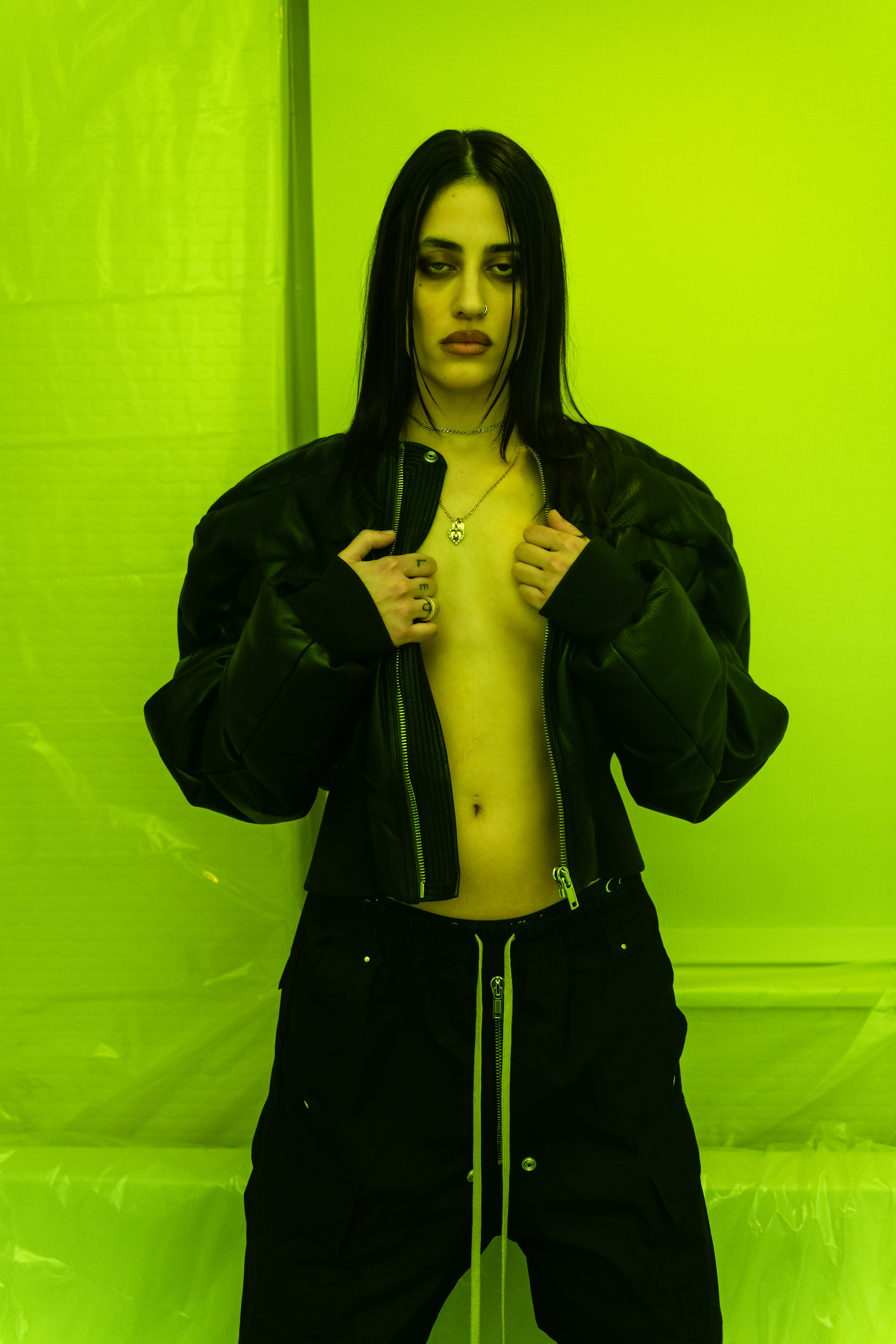

Background information
- Born: Chloe Erika Jane Olivié
- Origin: Biot, France
- Genres: Experimental hip hop; electronic; UK bass; deconstructed club; industrial hip hop
- Occupations: Music producer; singer; DJ
- Labels: Creamcake; Nuxxe
- Website: www.coucouchloe.com

Chloe Erika Jane Olivié, known by her stage name Coucou Chloe or Coucou Chloé, is a French music producer, singer and DJ, living in London.

== Biography ==
Olivié grew up in Biot, a village in the south of France. As a child she played a lot of piano, having been given one by her grandparents. She moved to nearby Nice to study contemporary art at Villa Arson and while there began taking her music production seriously. She left before completing the course and moved to London soon after.

Her experimental music—"austere, skeletal beats over which she often drapes her deadpan voice" and sampled animal noises—is often labelled as "deconstructed club music". She creates it with Logic Pro on a laptop, an external keyboard, and a microphone. Olivié is inspired by 1990s hip hop music, in particular Snoop Dogg.

The name Coucou Chloe "comes from a song her younger brother Leo (whose name is tattooed twice on her fingers) recorded in a card for her birthday. She'd go on to play the song at parties, and the name found a permanent home in her friends' heads". "Coucou" is a cute way of saying "hi".

Coucou Chloe is a co-founding member of music collective and record label Nuxxe (pronounced "newksie"), alongside Sega Bodega and Shygirl, both of whom she has collaborated with. She and Sega Bodega produce music as Y1640.

In October 2016, Coucou Chloe DJd her first Boiler Room set in Berlin.

She has modelled for Burberry and Vivienne Westwood fashion campaigns. Her 2016 track "Doom" was used by Rihanna for her Fenty x Puma New York Fashion Week show in 2017. "Underdog" was played during Joseph Altuzarra's 2017 Paris show. In 2020, Rihanna's Savage x Fenty fashion show premiered on Amazon Prime, again using "Doom." However Olivié and Rihanna apologised after Muslims accused the show of disrespect because "Doom" contains a recording of a hadith, or a sacred Islamic text.

== Discography ==
=== Solo as Coucou Chloe ===
- Halo (Creamcake, 2016) – EP
- Erika Jane (Nuxxe, 2017) – EP
- Naughty Dog (Nuxxe, 2019) – EP
- "Drop Ten" (Nuxxe, 2020) – single
- "Nobody" (Nuxxe, 2020) – single
- One (self-released, 2021) – EP
- 1 (self-released, 2022) – EP
- Wizz (Cobrah Remix) (self-released, 2022) – single
- Drift (self-released, 2023) – single
- Pokerface (self-released, 2023) – single
- Fever Dream (self-released, 2023) – album

=== With Sega Bodega as Y1640 ===
- "Spit Intent" (Nuxxe, 2016) – single
- "Weep" (Nuxxe, 2017) – single

=== Collaborations ===
- Campana with Dinamarca (2019)
- Bustdown Entrails with Hearteyes and Brodinski (2021)
- Stupid Love (Coucou Chloe Remix with Lady Gaga (2021)
- Walk Fast, Die Slow with DJ Topgun (2022)
- True with Housewife 9 (2022)
- It's Just This Thing with Zero (2022)
- Thief in the Night with Kelvin Krash (2022)
- Ice Castles with Matt OX (2023)
