= Rational (disambiguation) =

Rational may refer to:

- Rational number, a number that can be expressed as a ratio of two integers
- Rational point of an algebraic variety, a point defined over the rational numbers
- Rational function, a function that may be defined as the quotient of two polynomials
- Rational fraction, an expression built from the integers and some variables by addition, subtraction, multiplication and division
- Rational pricing an assumption in financial economics that asset prices will be arbitrage free
- Rational Software, a software company now owned by IBM
- Tenberry Software, formerly Rational Systems, a defunct American software company
- Rational AG, a German manufacturer of food processors
- RationaL, stage name of Canadian hip-hop artist Matt Brotzel
- The Rationals, a former American rock and roll band
- Rational, a personality classification in the Keirsey Temperament Sorter
- Priestly breastplate, called a 'rational' in older Biblical translations, from the Vulgate name for the breastplate: 'rationale'

== See also ==
- Rationality
- Rationale (disambiguation)
- Rationalism (disambiguation)
- Rationalization (disambiguation)
