= Kwayedza Kureya =

Zimbabwean singer-songwriter

Kwayedza Kureya (Kwaye)
- Origin: Zimbabwe
- Genres: Indie electronic; Synth-pop; neo-soul; funk
- Years active: 2017–present

Kwayedza Kureya, mononymously known by his stage name Kwaye, is a British-Zimbabwean singer and songwriter based in Los Angeles, California. He has released two EPs and his songs have been featured in Netflix's Topboy and On My Block. He played Jacob in the Julian Fellowes 2009 movie From Time to Time.

== Early life and singing career ==
Kwaye was born to a social worker mother and a doctor father. He lived in Zimbabwe until he was three. His family then moved to London, later settling in Kent.

Kureya began performing at an early age and grew up playing the viola, sax, and guitar. He later moved to Brighton to pursue a degree in American Studies. While on a study abroad program in Los Angeles, Kureya played a demo of one of his recently recorded songs for an Uber driver who was a former A&R executive. Within a few weeks, Kureya had signed a deal to release his music. His debut single, entitled "Cool Kids", was released in March 2017, under the stage name "Kwaye".

In May 2017, Kwaye announced the release of his second single entitled "Little Ones", released on 30 May 2017; and in July 2017, he announced the upcoming release of his debut extended play, entitled Solar, and also announced a third single release would be titled "Sweetest Life". Both songs debuted on 25 July 2017. After a break from music, Kwaye released three singles, "Run", "Runaway" and "Kindness" in 2021.

Kureya has three older sisters, one of whom is Shingai Shoniwa, lead singer of the indie rock band Noisettes.

== Discography ==
=== EPs ===
Solar (2017)
No.	Title	Writer(s)	Producer(s)	Length
1.	"Cool Kids"	Kwayedza Kureya; William Leong	Willson	3:44
2.	"Little Ones"	Kureya; Leong	Willson	4:27
3.	"Sweetest Life"	Kureya; Leong	Willson	3:52
Total length:				12:03

Love & Affliction (2018)
No.	Title	Writer(s)	Producer(s)	Length
1.	"Straight Lines"	Kwayedza Kureya; Aram Vehuni; Benjamin Barsocchini	Slenderbodies	3:59
2.	"What Have You Done"	Kureya; William Leong	Willson	3:32
3.	"Hanging On"	Kureya; Leong	Willson	3:30
4.	"Keep On Lovin' You"	Kureya; Leong	Willson	3:12
5.	"Made for It"	Kureya; Daniel Klein; Matthew Campfield	Some Randoms	4:31
6.	"Paralyzed"	Kureya; Tinashe Fazakerley	Rationale; Henry Guy	4:07
Total length:				22:51

=== Singles ===
==== As lead artist ====
- "Cool Kids" (2017)
- "Little Ones" (2017)
- "Sweetest Life" (2017)
- "Lost in My Boots" (2017)
- "Jasmine" (2017)
- "I Go" (2018)
- "What Have You Done" (2018)
- "Paralyzed" (2018)
- "Keep On Loving You" (2018)
- “Kindness” (2021)
- "Pendulum" (2023)

==== As featured artist ====
- "Steady Motion" (2019) (Motez featuring Kwaye)

=== Songwriting Credits ===
indicates a background vocal contribution.

Year	Artist	Album	Song	Co-written with
2019	Tiffany Young	TBA	"Magnetic Moon"	Tiffany Huang, Viktoria Hansen, Kevin Nishimura
2019	Tiffany Young	TBA	"Run for Your Life"	Tiffany Huang, April Nhem, Kevin Nishimura
