= Donna Missal =

American singer-songwriter

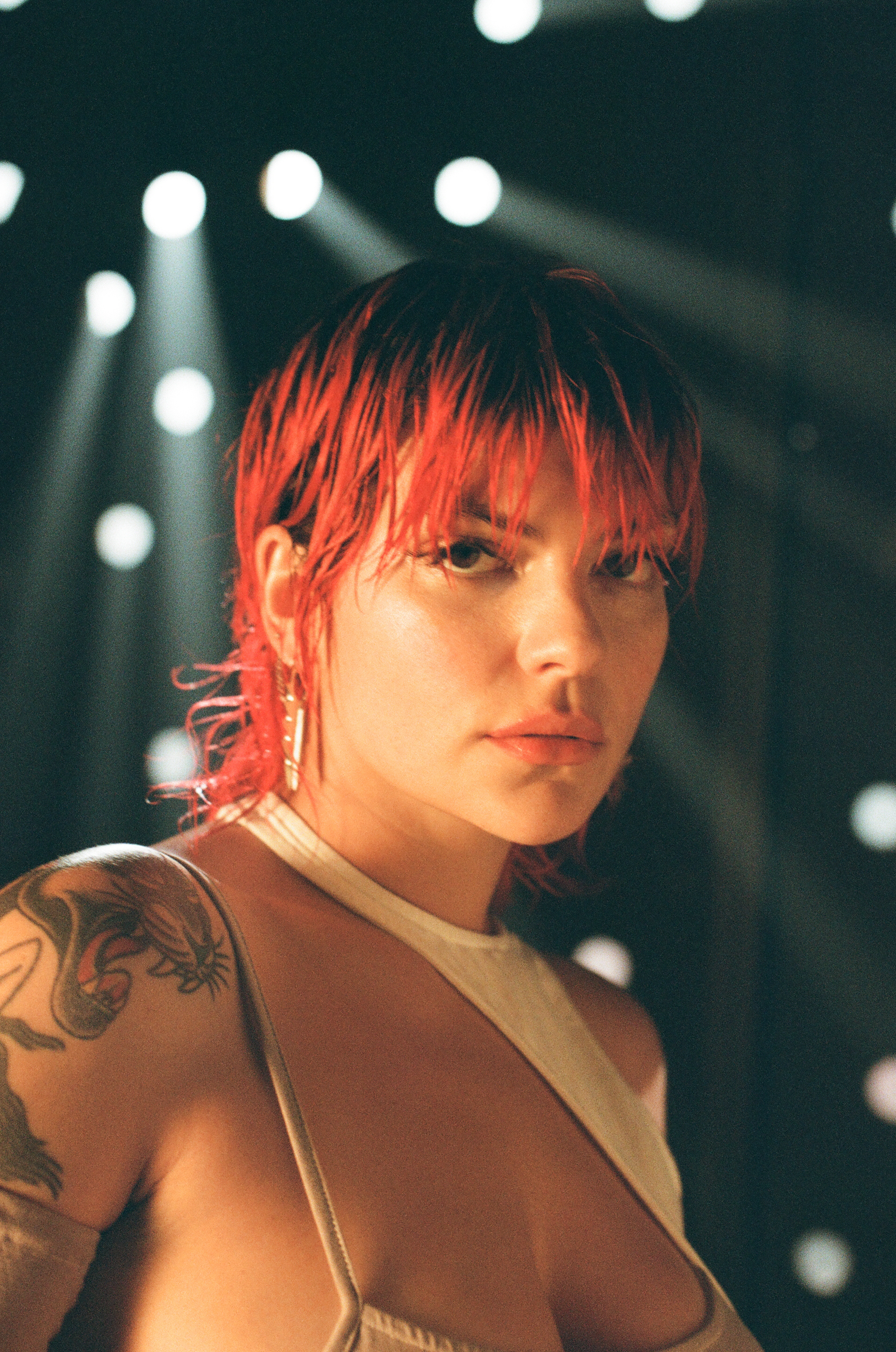
- Missal performing in 2019

Background information
- Born: December 26, 1990 (age 35); New Jersey, U.S.
- Occupations: Singer; songwriter
- Instrument: Vocals
- Years active: 2018–present
- Website: donnamissal.com

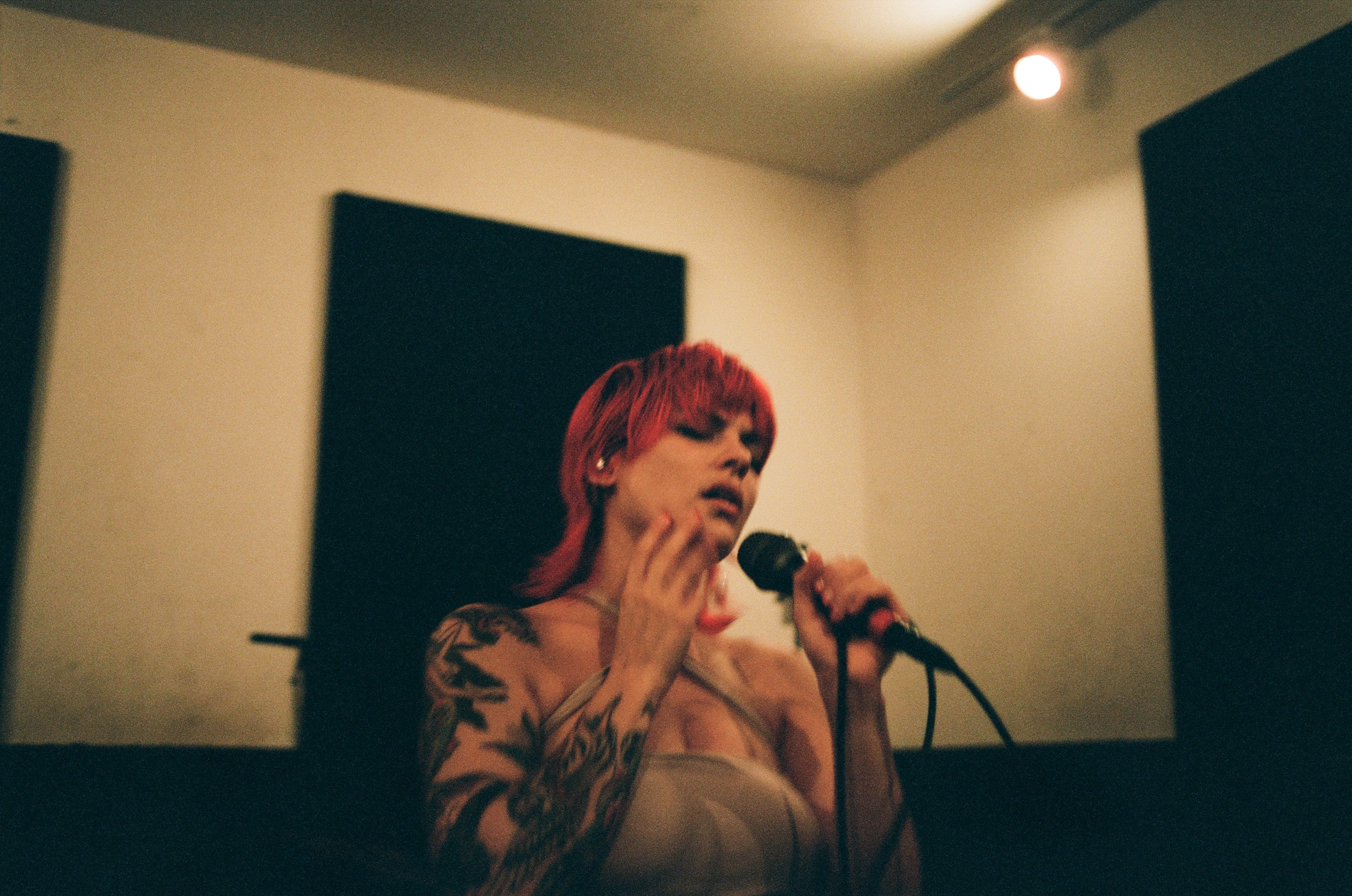
Missal in rehearsal by Erica Hernandez

Donna Joy Missal (/mɪsˈəl/ MIS-l; born December 26, 1990) is an American singer-songwriter from New Jersey.

== Early life and career ==
Missal grew up in a musical family; her grandmother was a songwriter in the 1950s and her father was a musician in the 1980s. She co-wrote and performed background vocals on the track "Wildfire", from Tinashe's debut album, Aquarius. Missal recorded "Keep Lying" in 2015, hoping other performers would cover it. It later went viral and was released in 2018. She released a number of other singles, and collaborated on a track with Macklemore in 2017. She released her debut album, This Time, in September 2018, and its follow-up, Lighter, in July 2020, both through Harvest Records.

In 2022, a month after releasing her EP In the Mirror, In the Night, Missal shared that she had been dropped by Harvest Records. She spent the year creating her first independently released album, titled Revel. She released lead single "Flicker" in March 2023, written about "coming out of that experience swinging."

== Personal life ==
Missal is bisexual.

Her brother, Steve Missal, is her guitarist. She also has four sisters.

== Discography ==
=== Studio albums ===
Title	Details
This Time	Release: September 7, 2018; Label: Harvest Records, Universal Music; Formats: CD, LP, digital download, streaming
Lighter	Release: July 10, 2020; Label: Harvest Records, Universal Music; Formats: CD, LP, digital download, streaming
Revel	Release: June 16, 2023; Label: Self-released; Formats: Digital download, streaming

=== Extended plays ===
Title	Details
In the Mirror, In the Night	Release: February 11, 2022; Label: Harvest Records, Universal Music; Formats: Digital download, streaming

=== Singles ===
==== As a lead artist ====
List of singles, showing year released and album name
Title	Year	Album
"Keep Lying (Demo)" (Note: "Keep Lying" was first released in 2015 under Bailey Blues Music, and was later re-recorded and included in Missal's debut album, This Time, under Harvest Records, in 2018.)	2015	Non-album singles
"Sick"	2016	Non-album singles
"The Keeper"	2016	Non-album singles
"Slide"	2016	Non-album singles
"Transformer" (Note: "Transformer" was first released in 2017 under Bailey Blues Music, and was later re-recorded and included in Missal's debut album, This Time, under Harvest Records, in 2018.)	2017	Non-album singles
"Thrills"	2018	This Time
"Driving"	2018	This Time
"Girl"	2018	This Time
"Keep Lying"	2018	This Time
"Transformer"	2018	This Time
"Get Well"	2019	Non-album single
"Jupiter"	2019	This Time
"You Burned Me"	2019	Non-album single
"Hurt By You"	2020	Lighter
"Let You Let Me Down"	2020	Lighter
"How Does It Feel"	2020	Lighter
"Sex Is Good (But Have You Tried)"	2021	In the Mirror, In the Night - EP
"(To Me) Your Face Is Love"	2021	In the Mirror, In the Night - EP
"Insecure"	2022	In the Mirror, In the Night - EP
"Flicker"	2023	Revel
"Out of Me"	2023	Revel
