= God Colony =

London-based industrial hip-hop music-producing duo

God Colony are a London-based industrial hip-hop music-producing duo, consisting of James Rand and Thomas Gorton. Their music has featured fellow SoundCloud stars Flohio, BbyMutha, Stash Marina and Kojey Radical.

== Early career ==
God Colony produced music together in Merseyside, England as teenagers, since moving to London, England. In 2015 they began working on a debut mix-tape with artists including Flohio.

== Releases ==
God Colony releases have been self-published and released on sites like BandCamp.

| Name | Release | Featuring |
|---|---|---|
| Where we were | June 28, 2016 | Stash Marina and Flohio |
| Turn My G Down | March 1, 2017 | Stash Marina |
| Fights | April 9, 2017 | Flohio |
| Howling | July 10, 2017 | Kojey Radical and Ebi Pamere |
| Mutha Music | September 8, 2017 | BbyMutha |
