= In the Blue Light (Kelela album) =

Live album by Kelela
- Released: February 11, 2025
- Recorded: May 28–29, 2024
- Venue: Blue Note Jazz Club (New York)
- Studios: The Bridge Studios (New York); Power Station (New York)
- Genres: Alternative R&B; jazz; neo soul
- Length: 63:59
- Label: Warp

Kelela chronology
RAVE:N, The Remixes (2024)	In the Blue Light (2025)	New Avatar (2026)

Singles from In the Blue Light
- 1. "Better (Unplugged)" Released: January 28, 2025

In the Blue Light is a live album by American singer Kelela, released on February 11, 2025 on Warp Records. The live recordings are taken from the two concerts Kelela held at the Blue Note Jazz Club in New York on May 28 and May 29, 2024. The album's lead single "Better (Unplugged)" was released on January 28, 2025.

== Critical reception ==
Professional ratings
Review scores
Source	Rating
AllMusic	4.5/5 stars
Pitchfork	8.0/10

Paul Simpson of AllMusic wrote that "In the Blue Light reveals a more introspective dimension to Kelela's craft, making it a standout in an already near-perfect discography." Simpson noted that Kelela's "songwriting has always been captivating, and often heartbreaking, and while her releases' futuristic production, incorporating a wide spectrum of forward-thinking club and electronic styles, is a major part of why her music is so unique, the songs are just as powerful interpreted in a neo-soul/jazz club setting." Tarisai Ngangura of Pitchfork said that Kelela "is a masterful re-interpreter of her own songs, unafraid to redo and redo and redo, stripping away instrumentation, adding more stacked vocals, or bringing in the acoustics of a band." Ngangura concluded the review in saying that "the album is memory revised and remixed. Kelela has sharpened an unnerving capacity to face despair, and it makes her work unexpectedly lethal: It can land like a teardrop, or slice like the first time you see the one you used to love after a break up."

== Track listing ==
In the Blue Light track listing
No.	Title	Writer(s)	Originally from	Length
1.	"Enemy"	Kelela Mizanekristos; Susumu Yokota; Asma Maroof; Will Boston	Cut 4 Me (2013)	6:59
2.	"Raven"	Mizanekristos	Raven (2023)	4:22
3.	"Take Me Apart"	Mizanekristos; Dominic Salole; Alexander Shuckburgh; Jordan Cruz	Take Me Apart (2017)	2:47
4.	"Bankhead"	Mizanekristos	Cut 4 Me	1:54
5.	"Waitin'"	Mizanekristos; Salole; Dean Bein	Take Me Apart	4:35
6.	"30 Years"	Betty Carter	Droppin' Things (1990); Betty Carter cover	4:09
7.	"All the Way Down"	Mizanekristos; Jeremiah Raisen; Jess Glynne; Talay Riley; Tinashe Kachingwe; Dacoury Natche	Hallucinogen (2015)	5:39
8.	"Furry Sings the Blues"	Joni Mitchell	Hejira (1976); Joni Mitchell cover	5:37
9.	"Blue Light"	Mizanekristos; Maroof; Sam Dew; Nia Andrews; Alexey Sushon	Take Me Apart	4:54
10.	"Love Notes"	Mizanekristos; Carter; Mark Zubek	Feed the Fire (1994); Betty Carter cover	8:17
11.	"Better"	Mizanekristos; Salole; Sushon; Romy Croft	Take Me Apart	6:39
12.	"Cherry Coffee"	Mizanekristos	Cut 4 Me	7:07
Total length:				63:59

Note

- All tracks are subtitled "(unplugged)"

== Personnel ==
Credits are adapted from Tidal.

- Kelela – lead vocals, executive production, creative direction
- Daniel Aged – bass, co-executive production
- Briley Harris – piano, Rhodes, keyboards
- Ahya Simone - harp
- Buz Donald – drums
- Alayna Rodgers – background vocals
- Xenia Manasseh – background vocals
- Simon Lancelot – mastering
- Gloria Kaba – mixing, vocal engineering
- Jessica Chambliss – vocal production on "Better (Unplugged)"
