= P. Morris (producer) =

American musician and record producer

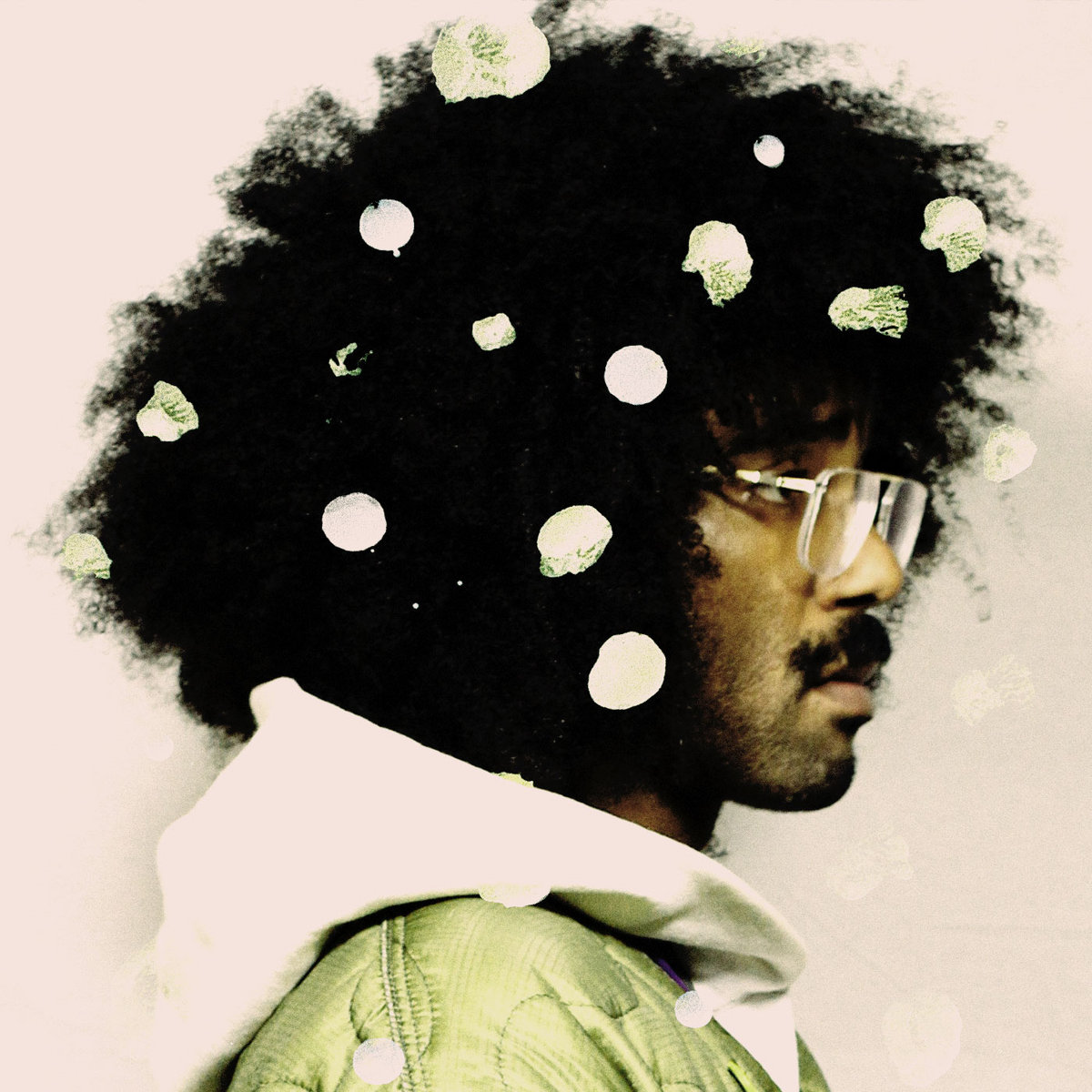

Background information
- Born: Philesciono Canty; Topeka, Kansas
- Occupation: Record producer
- Years active: 2012–present
- Labels: Night Slugs; Fade To Mind; Saint Records; Bear Club Music Group

Philesciono Canty, known professionally as P. Morris, is an American musician and record producer based in Los Angeles, California. Canty co-founded the record label Bear Club Music Group.

His discography includes several studio albums as well as numerous mixtapes, EPs, and collaborative projects.

== Early life ==
Philesciono Canty was born in Topeka, Kansas. His mother is a professor of Black music and his father is a radio personality. Canty attended Topeka High School, a public high school in Topeka, Kansas. Canty briefly enrolled at the University of Kansas to study film. After leaving college early, he toured domestically and internationally.

== Career ==
In 2013, he released his mixtape Debut. He also appeared on compilation album Night Slugs Allstars Vol. 2. Resident Advisor writer Andrew Ryce noted that "he fetishizes the holographic allure of southern rap beats, but fastens them to a distinctly American hip-hop template".

The same year, he was featured on Cut 4 Me, the debut EP by singer-songwriter Kelela. The song Go All Night, his first of several collaborations with Kelela, was also featured on the Solange Knowles–curated compilation Saint Heron.

The following year, 2014, he teamed up with Kelela and Le1f on the track OICU, which Pitchfork announced as a "new one-off song" bringing together their distinct styles. Later in 2014, Morris worked with Canadian producer Mocky to create the song "Grace," which appeared on his EP Beloved. In its review of Beloved, Resident Advisor remarked that "the loud-and-soft dynamic comes to life best on ‘Beloved,’ which seems like the happy resolution ... replete with sweetly-sung vocals and pretty piano playing."

In 2014, Morris toured with FKA Twigs.

In 2015, Morris reunited with producer Mocky for the project Head in the Clouds, a joint release in which the two artists remixed each other's songs.

In 2016, he produced Houston rapper Fat Tony's short Look EP, who Stereogum's Collin Robinson praised for "snapping right out of the gate, spitting hard over P. Morris' beat".

In 2021, he collaborated with comedian and rapper Zack Fox on the track "uhhh", featured on Fox's album Shut the Fuck Up Talking to Me.

== Discography ==
=== Studio albums ===
- Teeth (2016)
- Good Morning, I Love You (with Maal) (2016)
- Goombawave (2020)
- Goombawave II (2020)
- Goombawave III (2020)
- - (Selected Ambient Works 09-21) (2022)
- -- (Selected Ambient Works, Vol. 2) (2022)
- Anti-Distraction Loops (2024)

=== Mixtapes ===
- Debut (2014)
- POP.MORRIS Volume 1 (2014)
- POP.MORRIS Volume 2 (2014)
- POP.MORRIS Volume 3 (2015)
- POP.MORRIS Volume 4 (2017)
- Maestro (2024)

=== Compilation albums ===
- Morrisworks (Etudes for Orchestra & Synthesizer) (2023)
- 12 Pieces for Piano & Strings (2023)

=== EPs ===
- Beloved (2014)
- Head in the Clouds / Billets Doux (with Mocky) (2015)
- Daydream (2015)
- Low (2016)
- Look (with Fat Tony) (2016)

=== Singles ===
- Rashida Jones (2011)
- One Kiss (with Sinjin Hawke) (2011)
- Hold Tight (2012)
- White Hood (2013)
- Lunette [incomplete] (2014)
- Late Visitor (with Chilly Gonzales) (2016)
- I'm Gone (with Maal A Goomba) (2016)
- uhhh (with Zack Fox) (2021)
- California (2025)
- Kansas (2025)

=== Productions ===
- Kelela - "Go All Night" from Cut 4 Me (2013)
- Feist - "Don't Give Up" feat. Timber Timbre from And I'll Scratch Yours (2014)
- Le1f & Kelela - "OICU" (2014)

=== Remixes ===
- Mess Kid - "Sip Slow (MORRI$ PRPL DRVNK RMX)" (2012)
- Katy B - "Crying For No Reason (Morri$ Remix)" (2014)
