= Jam City =

English electronic music producer and DJ

- Also known as: Vincent L'Traques
- Born: Jack Louis Latham; London, England
- Genres: UK bass; electronic; pop; deconstructed club
- Occupations: DJ, producer
- Instruments: Laptop, guitar
- Years active: 2010-present
- Label: Night Slugs
- Website: www.jam-city.net

Jack Louis Latham is an English electronic music producer and DJ who performs under the alias Jam City. He has been active since 2010 and affiliated with the labels Night Slugs and Mad Decent. He has released five full-length albums beginning with 2012's Classical Curves. He has also produced for artists such as Kelela, Troye Sivan, Gaika, and Olivia Rodrigo.

== Recordings ==
=== Classical Curves ===
Jam City's debut album, Classical Curves, was released in 2012 to positive reception. Sonically, the album featured glossy, alien-sounding post-dubstep and club music and established his reputation for creating instrumentals from club music tropes. The Quietus called it "one of the most interesting album-length listens to come from a UK club producer in a while." It served as a central an inspiration on the emerging deconstructed club scene.

=== Dream a Garden ===
Latham's follow-up album, Dream a Garden, was released in 2015 and marked a drastic departure from the metallic club sounds of his debut, instead foregrounding pop songwriting and vocals. Inspired by the 2011 England riots and the work of bell hooks, the album further developed the sociopolitical conscience of his debut, engaging particularly with the effects of neoliberalism. Latham said the album "is about the personal effects of living under capitalism. Why do I feel shit and why do the people I love feel shit when they look at billboards?" The first single from the album, Unhappy, critiques corruptive elements of online porn.

=== Pillowland ===
After the more explicitly political Dream a Garden, Latham initially attempted to continue in this path by reacting musically to then-current world events. When this process did not lead to music he was satisfied with, he turned in a more personal direction, which led to the 2020 album Pillowland, inspired by California and focused on themes such as "a desire for a better life." Resident Advisor referred to it as vibrant, distorted, kaleidoscopic, and self-assured. Dan Barrow, writing for Tribune, described it as both dream-like and anti-dream, realistic and psychedelic, and argues that it showcases the way politics and music are connected "at every level". Similarly, Joe Creely wrote for The Line of Best Fit that Pillowland "interrogate[d] escapism while it embraced it."

=== EFM ===
In 2023, EFM was released, with more of a club-centered focus, inspired by his experience at Liquid and Envy. Pitchfork referred to it as "an effervescent blend of rattling garage, glitzy disco, and thumping house," The Line of Best Fit referred to it as "unabashed giddy fun" in contrast to Dream a Garden's more serious nature, and The Quietus described it as unified and straightforward, "an upbeat musical Blade Runner."

== Work with others ==
Latham has also written songs and produced for Kelela, producing "Keep It Cool" and "Cherry Coffee" on her mixtape Cut 4 Me, providing a remix of "Keep It Cool" on the deluxe edition, and acting as one of three executive producers for her 2017 album Take Me Apart. He also produced multiple songs on Lil Yachty's 2023 album Let's Start Here, implementing music from Pillowland along with other original productions.

== Personal life ==
Latham grew up in Redhill. He later worked as a fashion designer.

== Discography ==
=== Albums ===
- Classical Curves (2012)
- Dream a Garden (2015)
- Pillowland (2020)
- Jam City Presents EFM (2023)
- My World (2026)

=== Singles and EPs ===
- Refixes 12" (2010)
- "Magic Drops" (2010)
- Waterworx EP (2011)
- "Glide" (2012)
- Classical Club Mixes (2012)
- Club Constructions Vol 6 (2013)
- "Unhappy" (2014)
- "Proud" (2015)
- Earthly Versions (2015)
- Trouble Mixtape (2016)

== Songwriting and production credits ==
Title	Year	Artist(s)	Album	Credits	Written with	Produced with
"Keep It Cool"	2013	Kelela	Cut 4 Me	Producer	-	-
"Cherry Coffee"	2013	Kelela	Cut 4 Me	Producer	-	-
"INTRLD"	2016	Rosie Lowe	Control	Co-writer/Producer	Rosie Lowe	-
"I'll Be Gone"	2016	Rosie Lowe	Control	Co-writer/Co-producer	Rosie Lowe	Dave Okumu
"LMK"	2017	Kelela	Take Me Apart	Producer	-	Kwes
"Frontline"	2017	Kelela	Take Me Apart	Producer	-	-
"Waitin'"	2017	Kelela	Take Me Apart	Producer	-	Ariel Rechtshaid, Kwes
"Take Me Apart"	2017	Kelela	Take Me Apart	Producer	-	Al Shux, Ariel Rechtshaid, Arca, Loric Sih, Kwes
"Truth or Dare"	2017	Kelela	Take Me Apart	Producer	-	Kwes
"Turn to Dust"	2017	Kelela	Take Me Apart	Co-writer	Kelela Mizanekristos, Alejandra Ghersi, Romy Madley Croft	-
"Bluff"	2017	Kelela	Take Me Apart	Producer	-	-
"Altadena"	2017	Kelela	Take Me Apart	Producer	-	Ariel Rechtshaid, Kwes
"Intro"	2018	Bad Gyal	Worldwide Angel	Producer, songwriter	Alba Farelo	El Guincho
"Internationally"	2018	Bad Gyal	Worldwide Angel	Producer, songwriter	Alba Farelo, Joaquín Bartra, Marc Glasser	El Guincho, Dubbel Dutch
"The Good Side"	2018	Troye Sivan	Bloom	Co-writer/Additional producer	Troye Sivan, Brett McLaughlin, Bram Inscore, Alexandra Hughes, Ariel Rechtshaid	Ariel Rechtshaid, Bram Inscore
"Animal"	2018	Troye Sivan	Bloom	Co-writer/Co-producer	Troye Sivan, Brett McLaughlin, Bram Inscore, Alexandra Hughes, Ariel Rechtshaid	Ariel Rechtshaid, Bram Inscore, Buddy Ross, The Haxan Cloak
"No Fun"	2018	Joji	Ballads 1	Producer	George Miller	
"Life of the Party"	2020	Allie X	Cape God	Producer, co-writer	Alexandra Hughes, Oscar Görres	-
"Heather"	2020	Conan Gray	Kid Krow	Co-producer	-	Dan Nigro
"Phonecall"	2020	La Zowi	Élite	Co-producer	Zoe Jeanneau	Zora Jones, Sinjin Hawke
"A Ballet"	2020	Sébastien Tellier	Domesticated	Producer	-	Corentin "nit" Kerdraon
"Won"	2020	Sébastien Tellier	Domesticated	Producer	-	Corentin "nit" Kerdraon
"jealousy, jealousy"	2021	Olivia Rodrigo	SOUR	Co-producer	-	Dan Nigro, Olivia Rodrigo
"Top Picks for You"	2021	Injury Reserve	By the Time I Get to Phoenix	Co-producer, songwriter	Nathaniel Ritchie, Jordan Alexander Groggs, Parker Corey, Jeremiah Raisen	Parker Corey, Jeremiah Raisen
"The Ride"	2023	Lil Yachty	Let's Start Here	Producer, co-writer	Miles McCollum, Jeremiah Raisen, Justin Raisen, Miles Robinson, Aaron Thomas, Patrick Wimberly	Miles McCollum, Jeremiah Raisen, Justin Raisen, Patrick Wimberly
"Pretty"	2023	Lil Yachty	Let's Start Here	Producer, co-writer	Miles McCollum, Fousheé, Jeremiah Raisen, Justin Raisen, Patrick Wimberly	Jeremiah Raisen, Justin Raisen, Patrick Wimberly
"Say Something"	2023	Lil Yachty	Let's Start Here	Producer, co-writer	Miles McCollum, Jeremiah Raisen, Justin Raisen, Patrick Wimberly	Jeremiah Raisen, Justin Raisen, Patrick Wimberly
