= Lsdxoxo =

American rapper

LSDXOXO
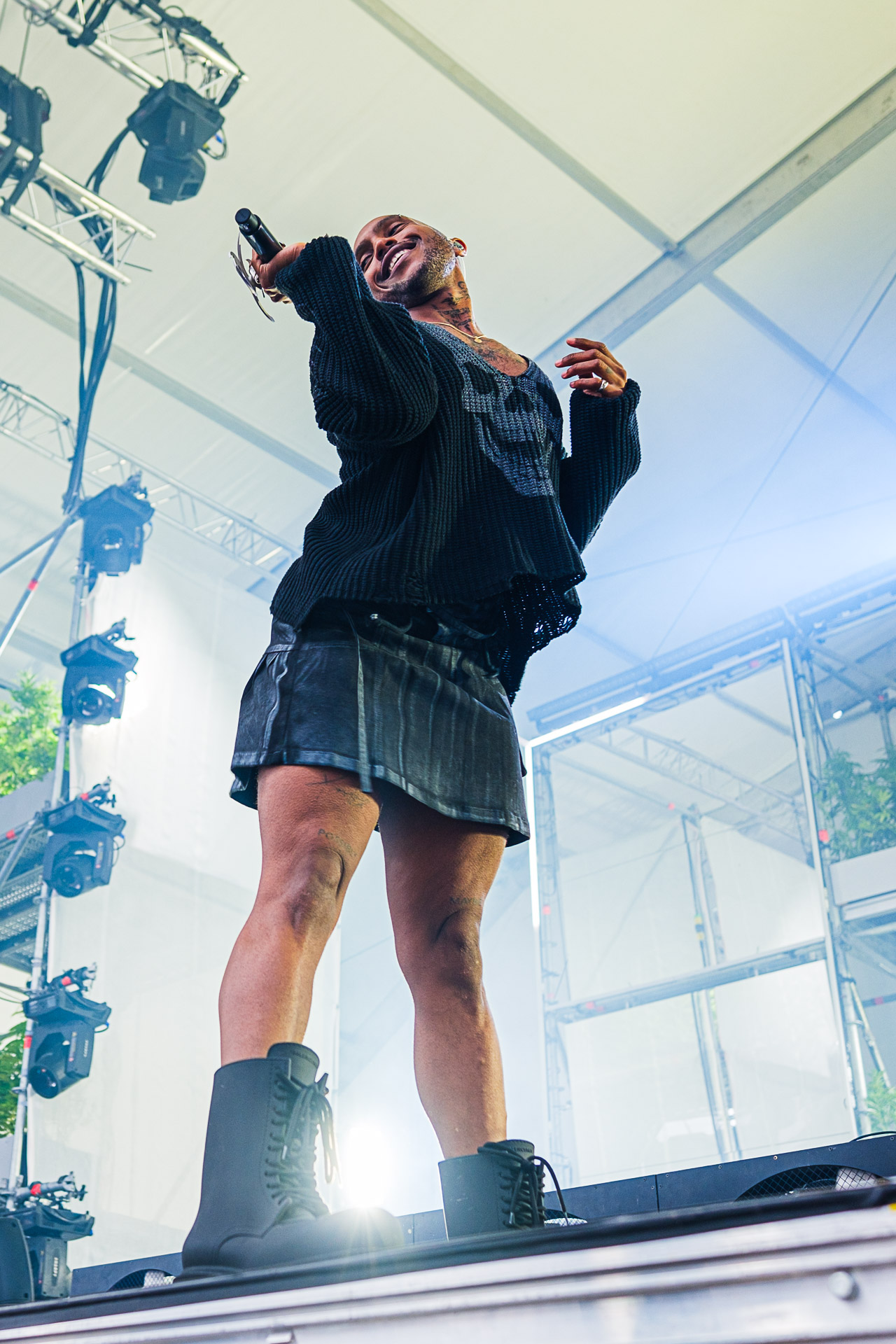
- Glasgow in 2024

Background information
- Also known as: LSD; Funky$punk; RJ Glasgow
- Born: Raushaan Jaquil Glasgow; June 4, 1991 (age 35); Philadelphia, Pennsylvania, U.S.
- Genres: Electronic; dance; techno; house; ballroom
- Occupations: Record producer, DJ
- Years active: 2010–present
- Labels: XL Recordings, GHE20G0TH1K
- Website: lsdxoxo.online

Raushaan Jaquil Fonville Glasgow (born June 4, 1991), better known by his stage name LSDXOXO, is a Berlin-based musician born in Philadelphia who made a name for himself in New York City as a DJ and producer. Glasgow is well known for his energetic DJ sets, which manipulate mainstream sounds by craftily layering pop tracks and vocal samples between Baltimore club, ghetto house, hardcore, electro and techno.

== Career ==
=== Early years (2010–2012) ===
"Pop culture is certainly one of my main musical and creative influences. I enjoy taking a popular narrative, whether that may be a highly recognizable artist or song, or even samples from a TV show or interview, and flipping them on their head. I guess it's a way for me to be socially and sometimes politically aware with my sound, without being so overly-conscious or heavy handed on the matter."

— Glasgow on his sound

Glasgow began making homemade dance edits of pop and hip hop hits during his first year of high school. He briefly went by Funky$punk in mid-2010, later adopting the LSDXOXO moniker because "it sounded like an AIM username, [...] was super troll-y, and that's just how [he] approached music as an artist".

In 2010, Glasgow began self-releasing his Spit or Swallow series of mixtapes on Tumblr, which were compiled of mashups of popular songs from artists such as Rihanna, Crystal Castles, M.I.A., Lady Gaga, and La Roux. The seven mixtapes have been described as dreamy, hazy, and hallucinogenic, though Glasgow has since described the production as "really crunchy and bad".

=== SOFTCORE, WHORECORE, and breakthrough (2013–2020) ===
In 2013, Glasgow began collaborating with other artists, lending his signature sound to now-established acts like Big Momma and BbyMutha. One of Glasgow's more well-known works is the song "Truth Tella" which features Cakes da Killa rapping over a chopped and screwed sample of "Lavender Town" from a Pokémon game. The song was included in the tracklist of his debut extended play SOFTCORE, which featured several different artists such as Cakes da Killa, UNiiQU3, and DonChristian. Glasgow's follow-up extended play WHORECORE was released on July 2, 2014, and some of the collaborators from SOFTCORE returned as featured artists on the EP.

After gaining a sizable following through his early releases, Glasgow found himself based in New York. He began performing in NYC at events like Joey LaBeija's "Legendary" parties in Williamsburg, Brooklyn and was welcomed into the GHE20G0TH1K collective. Having been touring heavily in Europe, Glasgow moved to Berlin, Germany.

=== Dedicated 2 Disrespect, Delusions of Grandeur, and Dogma (2021–present) ===
In May 2021, Glasgow released his highly anticipated third EP Dedicated 2 Disrespect through XL Recordings, containing four tracks that presented his own songwriting and vocals rather than music samples as his previous works had featured. The lead single off of the EP, "Sick Bitch", received critical acclaim and has been played in several DJ sets since its release. Later in the year, Glasgow also remixed Lady Gaga's "Alice" for her third remix album Dawn of Chromatica, serving as the album's opening track.

Production of Glasgow's debut studio album was announced in 2022, initially said to feature lead single "DRaiN", released April 26, 2022. In June 2022, Glasgow collaborated with fellow Pennsylvanian musician Eartheater on the single "Demons", another possible track on Glasgow's upcoming album. On February 10, 2023, American singer Kelela released her second studio album Raven, which featured five songs produced by Glasgow. He had previously remixed her song "Truth or Dare" in 2018, which appeared on her remix album Take Me a Part, the Remixes. On September 22, 2023, Glasgow released his fourth extended play Delusions of Grandeur, supported by the electroclash-inspired singles "Double Tap" and "J'adore" and released through Fantasy Audio Group, his new record label.

In May 2024, Glasgow released the single "BLOODLUST", promoted as the lead single for his debut album Dogma, followed by a follow-up single "4LUVN". On June 25, Glasgow announced the official release date of Dogma as September 13, 2024. The album includes featured vocals from Rochelle Jordan and Kelela, both of which Glasgow has produced for in the past.

== Personal life ==
Born in Philadelphia, Glasgow is of half African-American and half Dominican descent. He is gay.

== Discography ==
- Dogma (2024)

== See also ==
- LGBT culture in New York City
- List of LGBT people from New York City
