= Raven (Kelela album) =

2023 studio album by Kelela

Studio album by Kelela
- Released: February 10, 2023
- Recorded: 2020–2022
- Genres: R&B; breakbeat; 2-step
- Length: 62:33
- Label: Warp
- Producers: Kelela; Asmara; Yo van Lenz; LSDXOXO; Bambii; Florian TM Zeisig; Brandon Peralta; Kaytranada; Khalí Carela; AceMo; Fauzia; Paris Strother; Badsista; Mocky

Kelela chronology
Take Me a_Part, the Remixes (2018)	Raven (2023)	Rave:n, the Remixes (2024)

Singles from Raven
- 1. "Washed Away" Released: September 13, 2022; 2. "Happy Ending" Released: October 19, 2022; 3. "On the Run" Released: November 15, 2022; 4. "Contact" Released: January 17, 2023; 5. "Enough for Love" Released: February 7, 2023

Raven is the second studio album by American singer and songwriter Kelela. It was released on February 10, 2023, via Warp Records, six years after the release of the singer-songwriter's debut album Take Me Apart. A remix album, titled Rave:N, the Remixes, was released on February 9, 2024. In a press release, Kelela said Raven began as a reaction to feeling alone as a Black femme working within dance music, and described the album as an affirmation of that perspective. The album was supported by the singles "Washed Away", "Happy Ending", "On the Run", "Contact", and "Enough for Love".

== Critical reception ==
Professional ratings
Aggregate scores
Source	Rating
AnyDecentMusic?	8.0/10
Metacritic	86/100
Review scores
Source	Rating
AllMusic	4.5/5 stars
Clash	8/10
The Daily Telegraph	5/5 stars
DIY	4/5 stars
Exclaim!	8/10
The Guardian	4/5 stars
NME	4/5 stars
Pitchfork	8.4/10
The Skinny	4/5 stars
Slant Magazine	4/5 stars

At Metacritic, which assigns a normalized rating out of 100 to reviews from mainstream critics, the album received an average score of 86, based on 18 critical reviews, indicating "universal acclaim". Aggregating 20 critic scores, AnyDecentMusic? rated Raven an 8.0 out of 10.

Reviewing the album for AllMusic, Andy Kellman described the album as a series of "(constant) if fluid oscillations between diaphanous ballads, pulsing slow jams, and modern street soul bangers . . . suited for the greater number of songs based in relationships."

Joey Levenson at NME compared it to Kelela's debut, saying it "makes for a frequently breathtaking companion to Take Me Apart," and that in a "debut album which was all about breaking down, Raven reminds us of what it means to be put back together".

Pitchfork designated the album "Best New Music", with Eric Torres calling it a "rapturous" and "masterful display of tension and release, centering queer Black womanhood through blasts of heated dance music and ambient comedowns".

=== Year-end lists ===
Select year-end rankings of Raven
Critic/Publication	List	Rank	Ref.
Resident Advisor	The Best Albums of 2023	1	
Consequence	The 50 Best Albums of 2023	13	
The Line of Best Fit	The Best Albums of 2023	17	
Paste	The 50 Best Albums of 2023	16	
Pitchfork	The 50 Best Albums of 2023	17	
Rolling Stone	The 100 Best Albums of 2023	83	
Stereogum	The 50 Best Albums of 2023	26	

== Track listing ==
All tracks written by Kelela, except "Closure", written by Kelela & Rahrah Gabor. All tracks arranged by Kelela. Additional lyricists are listed.

Raven track listing
No.	Title	Lyrics	Producer(s)	Length
1.	"Washed Away"	Janiva Ellis	Yo van Lenz	3:36
2.	"Happy Ending"		LSDXOXO; Bambii^{[a]}	4:08
3.	"Let it Go"	Ellis	van Lenz; Florian TM Zeisig; Kelela; Asmara^{[a]}; Bambii^{[a]}	4:22
4.	"On the Run"	Shayna McHayle; Ellis	van Lenz; Kelela; Kaytranada; Bambii; Asmara^{[a]}	4:52
5.	"Missed Call"	Asmara; Raushaan Glasgow	LSDXOXO; Bambii^{[a]}; Brandon Peralta^{[a]}	3:51
6.	"Closure"		LSDXOXO; Bambii^{[a]}	3:29
7.	"Contact"	Asmara	LSDXOXO; Asmara; Peralta^{[a]}; Bambii^{[a]}	4:00
8.	"Fooley"	Ellis	Khalí Carela; Bambii^{[a]}; Peralta^{[a]}	3:34
9.	"Holier"		van Lenz; Zeisig; Khalí Carela^{[a]}	4:14
10.	"Raven"		AceMo; Fauzia; Kelela; Asmara^{[a]}	4:36
11.	"Bruises"		LSDXOXO; Asmara^{[a]}; Bambii^{[a]}	4:15
12.	"Sorbet"		van Lenz; Kelela; Paris Strother; Bambii; Peralta^{[a]}	5:29
13.	"Divorce"	Blane Muise; Ellis	van Lenz; Zeisig	3:21
14.	"Enough for Love"	Ellis	van Lenz; Zeisig; Badsista; Asmara^{[a]}; Mocky^{[a]}; Bambii^{[a]}	4:25
15.	"Far Away"		van Lenz	4:21
Total length:				62:33

Notes

- ^{^[a]} signifies an additional producer.

== Personnel ==
- Kelela – vocals, creative direction
- Dave Kutch – mastering
- Chris Tabron – mixing
- Brandon Peralta – mix engineering
- Kari Estes – mixing assistance
- Mischa Notcutt – creative direction
- Kim Cousee – layout, design
- Mario Horne – layout, design
- Alessandro Belliero – artwork
- Denis Olgac – artwork
- Hendrik Schneider – artwork

== Charts ==
Chart performance for Raven
Chart (2023)	Peak position
Belgian Albums (Ultratop Flanders)	168
Scottish Albums (Official Charts)	91
UK Album Downloads (Official Charts)	22
UK Independent Albums (Official Charts)	18
US Top Album Sales (Billboard)	47

== RAVE:N, The Remixes ==
RAVE:N, The Remixes

Remix album by Kelela
- Released: February 9, 2024
- Length: 81:39
- Label: Warp

Kelela chronology
Raven (2023)	RAVE:N, The Remixes (2024)	In the Blue Light (2025)

Singles from RAVE:N, The Remixes
- 1. "Contact (Karen Nyame KG Remix)" Released: October 20, 2023; 2. "Closure (Flexulant x BAMBII Remix)" Released: December 6, 2023; 3. "Happy Ending (A.G Remix)" Released: December 27, 2023; 4. "Holier (JD. REID Remix)" Released: January 24, 2024

=== Background and release ===
On October 20, 2023, Kelela announced a remix album to Raven titled RAVE:N, The Remixes, alongside the album's lead single, "Contact (Karen Nyame KG Remix)." On December 6, 2023, she released the album's second single "Closure (Flexulant x BAMBII Remix), featuring Rahrah Gabor + Brazy, alongside the tracklist. On December 27, 2023, she released "Happy Ending (A.G Remix)", the album's third single. On January 24, 2024, she released the album's fourth single, "Holier (JD. REID Remix)", which featured rapper/singer and DJ Shygirl.

=== Track listing ===
All tracks written by Kelela Mizanekristos. All tracks arranged by Kelela. Additional lyricists are listed.

RAVE:N, The Remixes track listing
No.	Title	Lyrics	Producer(s)	Length
1.	"Raven" (Agazero Remix featuring BbyMutha)	Brittnee Moore	Agazero; AceMo; Fauzia; Asmara	4:58
2.	"Contact" (Karen Nyame KG Remix)	Asmara	Lsdxoxo; Brandon Peralta; BAMBII; Karen Nyame KG	4:27
3.	"Closure" (Flexulant x BAMBII Remix featuring Rahrah Gabor & Brazy)	Gabor; brazy	Lsdxoxo; Flexulant; BAMBII	4:46
4.	"Holier" (JD. REID Remix featuring Shygirl)	Blane Muise	JD. REID; Yo van Lenz; Florian TM Zeisig; Khalí Carela	3:35
5.	"Bruises" (SUCIA! Remix)		Lsdxoxo; Asmara; BAMBII; SUCIA!	3:32
6.	"Washed Away" (Ethereal Remix featuring Liv.e)	Hailee Olivia Williams	Ethereal; van Lenz	3:57
7.	"Far Away" (DJ Swisha Remix)		DJ Swisha; van Lenz	3:47
8.	"Raven" (TYGAPAW Remix featuring Rochelle Jordan)	Jordan	TYGAPAW; AceMo; Fauzia; Kelela	4:26
9.	"Sorbet" (LSDXOXO Remix)		Kelela; LSDXOXO; van Lenz; Paris Strother; BAMBII; Peralta	4:31
10.	"Divorce" (DJ Manny Remix)	Muise; Janiva Ellis	DJ Manny; van Lenz; Zeisig	4:36
11.	"Fooley" (LEECH Ambient Queen Remix)	Ellis	LEECH; Nightfeelings; Khalí; BAMBII; Peralta	4:18
12.	"Missed Call" (KYRUH Remix)	LSDXOXO; Asmara	LSDXOXO; KYRUH; BAMBII; Peralta	3:36
13.	"Happy Ending" (A.G Remix)		A.G; BAMBII; Lsdxoxo	3:15
14.	"Let It Go" (NGUZUNGUZU x DJ GAY-Z Remix)	Ellis	Kelela; NGUZUNGUZU; DJ GAY-Z; van Lenz; BAMBII; Zeisig; Asmara	5:44
15.	"On the Run" (River Moon Remix featuring ThugPop)	Ellis; Christen Mooney	Kelela; River Moon; Kaytranada; van Lenz; BAMBII; Asmara	3:27
16.	"Enough For Love" (Tayhana Remix)	Ellis	Kelela; Tayhana; Zeisig; van Lenz; BAMBII; BADSISTA; Asmara; Mocky	3:59
17.	"Enough For Love" (Yaeji heart+beat Remix)	Ellis	Yaeji; Zeisig; van Lenz; BAMBII; BADSISTA; Asmara; Mocky	2:29
18.	"Divorce" (Loraine James Remix)	Ellis; Muise	Zeisig; van Lenz; Loraine James	3:53
19.	"Far Away" (DJ LHC Remix)		van Lenz; DJ LHC	2:56
20.	"Far Away" (SUUTOO His Eye Is On the Raven Remix featuring Ms. Carrie Stacks)	Ms. Carrie Stacks	van Lenz; SUUTOO	5:27
Total length:				81:39

=== Critical reception ===
Professional ratings
Review scores
Source	Rating
Pitchfork	7.8/10

Writing for Pitchfork, Harry Tafoya praised the album's production writing: "RAVE:N bears the distinction of being the most kinetic Kelela release in a very long time." Kiana Mickles's review for Resident Advisor concludes: "It pulls out all the stops—freshly recorded vocals, relevant contributors and a perfect song for every hour of the night."

== Release history ==
Release dates and format(s) for Raven
Region	Date	Format(s)	Label	Ref.
Various	February 10, 2023	vinyl; CD; streaming; digital download	Warp	
