= Hallucinogen (disambiguation) =

A hallucinogen is a drug that produces profoundly altered states of consciousness.

Hallucinogen may also refer to:

- Hallucinogen (EP), an extended play by Kelela
- Hallucinogen (musician) (Simon Posford; born 1971), English electronic and psytrance musician
