= Mocky =

Canadian musician (born 1974)

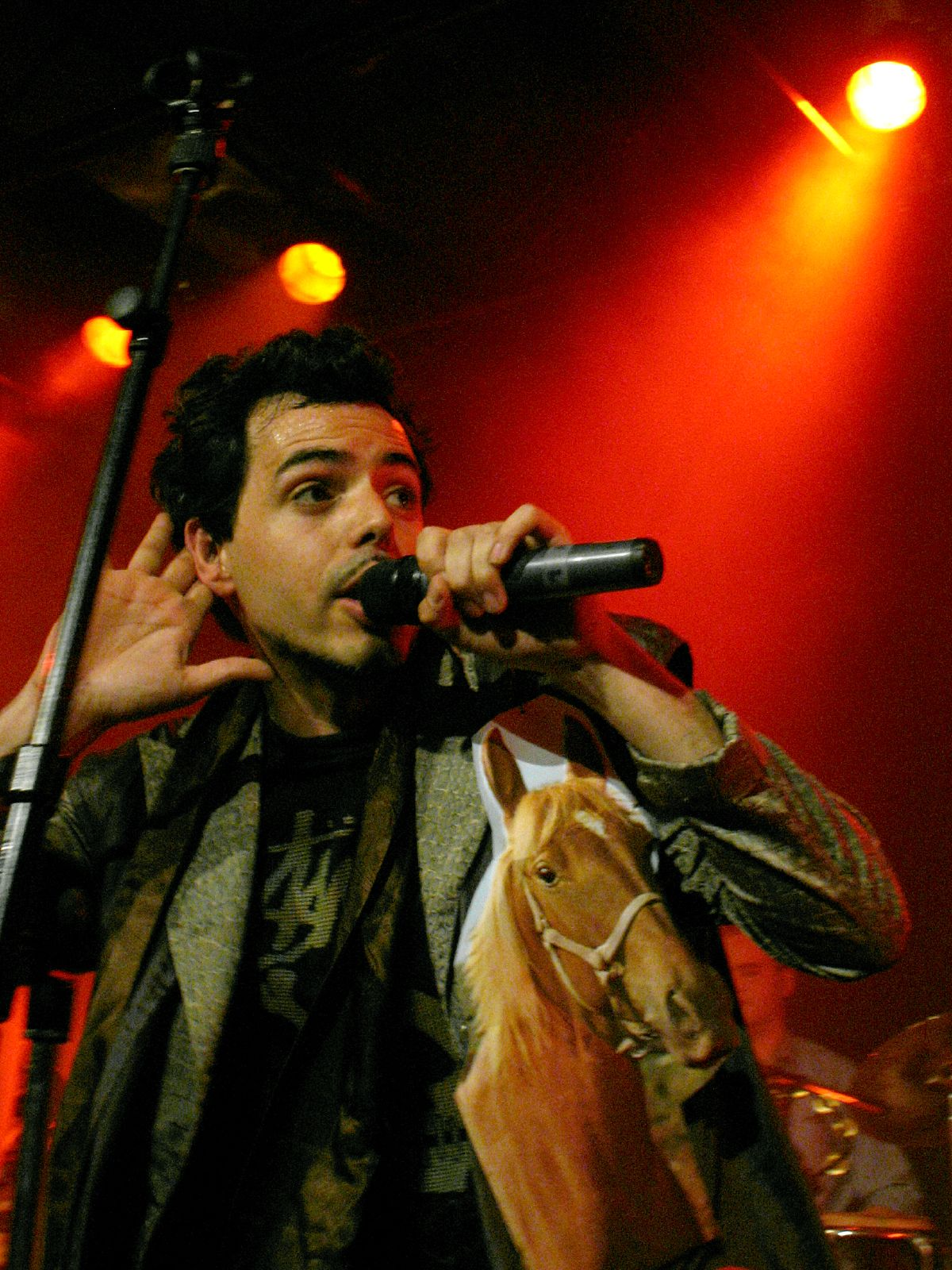
- Mocky performing in 2006

Background information
- Born: Dominic Salole; October 7, 1974 (age 52); Saskatchewan, Canada
- Genres: Pop; jazz; hip hop; electronic
- Occupations: Singer; producer; songwriter; multi-instrumentalist; composer
- Instruments: Vocals; drums; guitar; piano; electronics; bass
- Years active: 2000–present
- Labels: Heavy Sheet, Stones Throw Records
- Website: mockyrecordings.com

Dominic Salole (born October 7, 1974), known professionally as Mocky, is a Canadian singer-songwriter, multi-instrumentalist, record producer, and composer.

== Biography ==
Mocky was born in Saskatchewan, Canada. He later moved to Ottawa and Toronto, and then to London, Amsterdam and Berlin. He currently lives in Los Angeles. He is of multiracial descent.

== Musical work ==
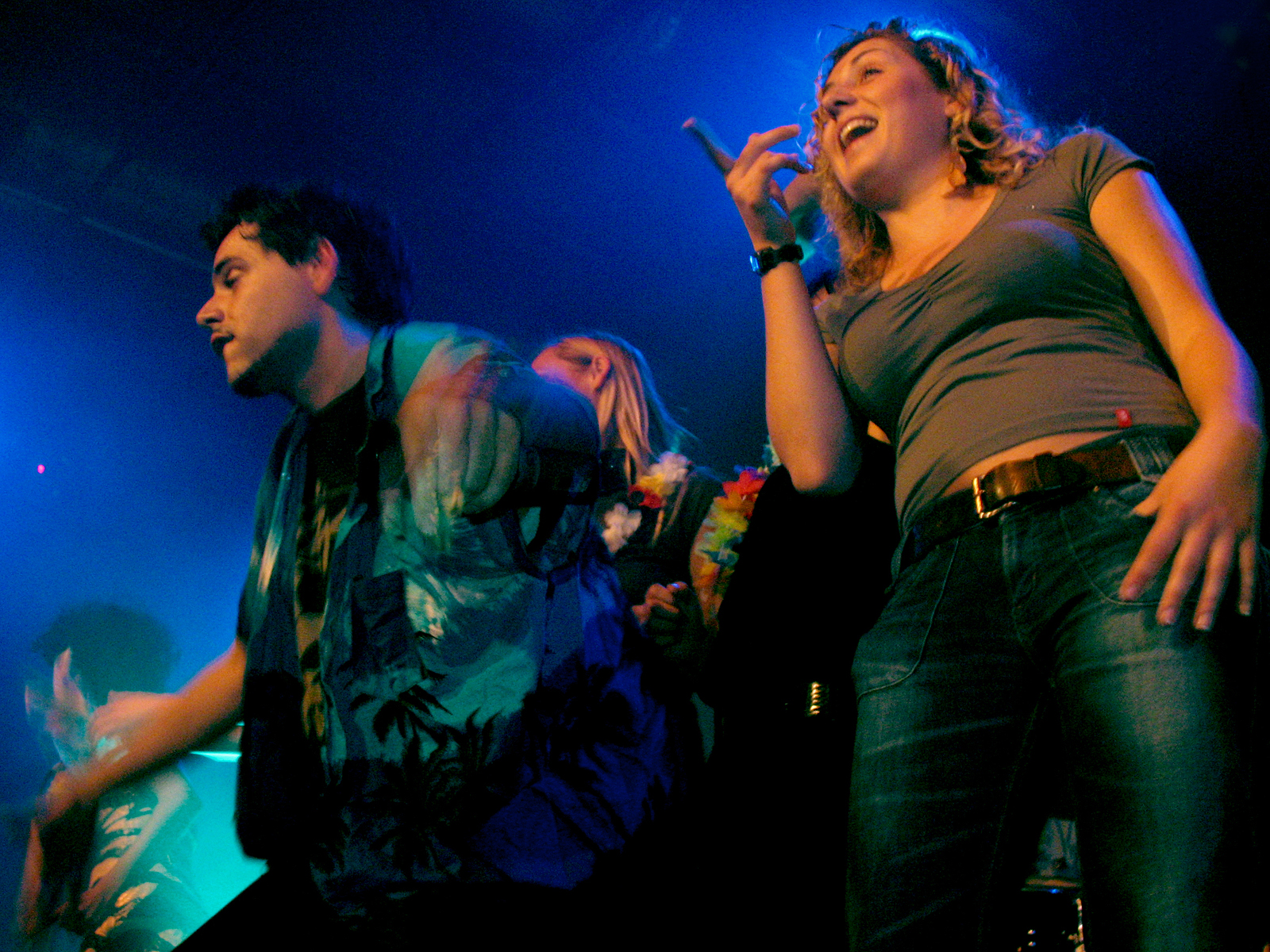
Mocky grooving with fans at a performance on May 20, 2006 at the Stadtgarten concert hall in Cologne, Germany.

Mocky has released ten albums under his own name: In Mesopotamia, Are + Be, Navy Brown Blues, Saskamodie, Key Change, Music Save Me (One More Time), A Day At United and Overtones For The Omniverse, Goosebumps Per Minute Vol. 1and Music Will Explain (Choir Music Vol.1). He released them first on his own label Mockyrecordings and the Japanese label Saidera, then on the German labels Gomma and Four Music, as well as on V2 Records in France, and Saskamodie on Crammed Discs. In 2025 Mocky signed to LA's Stones Throw Records Label. As a producer and songwriter he has worked with artists such as Jamie Lidell, Feist, Kelela, Matt Corby, Miguel Atwood-Ferguson, Vulfpeck, Joey Dosik, Moses Sumney, Selah Sue, Nikka Costa, GZA, Alejandro Jodorowsky, Chilly Gonzales, and Peaches He was also a member of the groups Puppetmastaz, The Shit, Son, The D.O.M, the Freeway Band, and The Roustabouts.

In December 2008, Mocky announced the 2009 release of his mostly instrumental album Saskamodie on the Crammed Discs label. The album was released to wide critical acclaim, Pitchfork Media calling it an "exceptional musical album". In 2012, Mocky announced his move from his longtime home, Berlin, to Los Angeles. In late 2012 he premiered his song "Little Bird" via The Fader and a video for the new song "Make You Rich" via Vogue.

In February 2013, he released the 7 song EP "Graveyard Novelas (The Moxtape Vol. 1)" and premiered it on Paper In February 2015, Mocky released the EP "Living Time (The Moxtape Vol. 2)" and in June Mocky released the album "Key Change" on his own Heavy Sheet label. Mocky released two more editions of his "Moxtapes" in 2016 and 2017 with "The Moxtape Vol. 3" and "How To Hit What And How Hard" and 2018 saw him release a compilation album with the best songs from those Moxtapes and some exclusives as an album entitled "Music Save Me (One More Time). Also in 2018 Mocky started a new series of albums and with "A Day At United" released a collection of 9 instrumentals, recorded at United Recording Studios in Los Angeles.

In 2019, Mocky delved into soundtrack work by collaborating with Anime director Shinichiro Watanabe on the first two seasons of the Netflix show Carole & Tuesday, for which he won Best Score at the 4th Crunchyroll Anime Awards. In 2020, he started a new single series with two songs featuring the Portuguese singer Liliana Andrade, and in 2021, he released an orchestral album "Overtones For The Omniverse" and a series of Jazz/Funk instrumentals under the title "Goosebumps Per Minute".

In 2025 Mocky released his album "Music Will Explain (Choir Music Vol. 1)" on the Los Angeles Label Stones Throw Records.

== The Canadian Crew ==
Mocky is considered to be a member of the Canadian Crew, a loose collective of immigrant Canadian musicians mostly living in Europe.

== Co-writing and co-producing credits ==
In September 2009, Mocky had an appearance by the rapper GZA on his tune "Birds of a Feather".

In 2010 and 2011 Mocky co-produced the albums Buen Soldado by Francisca Valenzuela, Modern Day Addiction by Clare Bowditch and Metals by Feist.

Mocky has co-written and co-produced songs for:

- Jamie Lidell's 2005 album Multiply and 2008 album JIM.
- Feist's albums The Reminder (nominated for four grammys) and Metals.

He also collaborates with musicians Chilly Gonzales and Kevin Blechdom.

Some of Mocky's other co-writing credits include:

- "Bittersweet Melodies", "Graveyard", "Caught A Long Wind" from the album Metals by Feist
- "Multiply", "When I Come Back Around", "What's the Use", "What is it this Time" and "Game for Fools" from the album Multiply by Jamie Lidell
- "Take me to Broadway" with Gonzales
- "So Sorry" from the album The Reminder by Feist
- "Another Day", "Wait for me", Out of my System", "All I Wanna Do", "Little Bit of Feelgood", "Figured me Out", "Green Light", "Rope of Sand" from the album Jim by Jamie Lidell
- "Without Love" from the Album Pebble to a Pearl by Nikka Costa
- Resolution and "Lay You Down" from the "Resolution EP" by Matt Corby
- "Trick of the Light" from the "Live on the Resolution Tour EP" by Matt Corby
- "Not Knowing" from the "Grow" Single by Rae Morris
- "Floorshow" and "Do It Again" from the "Cut 4 Me" Mixtape by Kelela
- "Never Gone" from the album Elsewhere by Denai Moore
- "Worth The Wait" by Nils Wülker feat. Jill Scott
- "Overthinking" by Romans feat. Mary J. Blige
- "Young Up", "Pleasure", "Any Party", "Baby Be Simple" from the "Pleasure" album by Feist (singer)
- "Take Me Apart", "Waitin", "Enough", "Better", "Altadena" from the "Take Me Apart" album by Kelela
- "Rockets" by Lion Babe feat. Moe Mocks
- "Inside Voice", "Take Mine", "Don't Want It To Be Over", "Past The Point", "Emergency Landing" by Joey Dosik
- "Scratch The Surface" by Moses Sumney
- "Birds Of A Feather" by Vulfpeck
- "Take Me To A Higher Place" by Vulfmon
- "Duplicate" and "Beat100" by Benny Sings feat. Marc Rebillet Cola Boyy
- "No Bad News" by Cordae feat. Kanye West (including a sample of the Mocky Co-Write "Inside Voice (Reprise)" by Joey Dosik
- "Take Me" by G-Dragon

== Soundtrack work ==
In 2011, Mocky composed the soundtrack to Xiaolu Guo's new full-length feature movie UFO in Her Eyes that was filmed in China.

In 2019, he composed the background music for Carole & Tuesday, an anime television series directed by Shinichirō Watanabe for which he was awarded "Best Score" at the Crunchyroll Anime Awards 2020.

== Discography ==
=== Albums ===
- 2002: In Mesopotamia
- 2004: Are + Be
- 2006: Navy Brown Blues
- 2009: Saskamodie
- 2015: Key Change
- 2018: Music Save Me (One More Time)
- 2018: A Day At United
- 2021: Overtones For The Omniverse
- 2022: Goosebumps Per Minute
- 2025: Music Will Explain (Choir Music Vol.1)

=== EPs ===
- 2013: Graveyard Novelas EP (The Moxtape Vol.1)
- 2015: Living Time EP (The Moxtape Vol.2)
- 2016: The Moxtape Vol.3
- 2017: How To Hit What And How Hard (The Moxtape Vol. IV)

=== Singles ===
- 2005: "Catch a Moment in Time"
- 2006: "Fightin' Away the Tears" (featuring Feist)
- 2006: "How Will I Know You?" (featuring Jamie Lidell)
- 2009: " Birds of a Feather "
- 2020: " Feeling Like I Like " (feat. Liliana Andrade)
- 2020: " Little Push " (feat. Liliana Andrade)
- 2021: " Wavelengths "
- 2021: " Refractions "
- 2022: " Get Down (Before You Lose Control) " (feat. Nia Andrews)

=== Soundtracks ===
- 2011: UFO in Her Eyes
- 2019: Carole & Tuesday
- 2023: Les Cyclades

== Production credits and appearances ==
=== Albums/Singles ===
- 2002: Gonzales – The Entertainist
- 2002: Puppetmastaz – Zoology
- 2003: Gonzales – Presidential Suite
- 2005: Studio R – Clapz
- 2005: Puppetmastaz – Creature Shock Rock Radio
- 2005: Kevin Blechdom – Eat My Heart Out
- 2005: Jamie Lidell – Multiply
- 2006: Jane Birkin – Fictions
- 2006: Jamie Lidell – Multiply Additions
- 2006: Soffy O – The Beauty of It
- 2007: Micky Green – White T-Shirt
- 2007: Teki Latex – Party de plaisir
- 2007: Feist – The Reminder
- 2008: Jamie Lidell – Jim
- 2008: Puppetmastaz – The Takeover
- 2008: Nikka Costa – Pebble to a Pearl
- 2010 Cibelle – Las Venus Resort Palace Hotel
- 2011: Francisca Valenzuela – Buen Soldado
- 2011: Feist – Metals
- 2012 Y'akoto – Baby Blues
- 2013 Bassekou Kouyate – Jamako
- 2013: Rae Morris – Grow (Single)
- 2013: Matt Corby – Resolution EP
- 2013: Kelela – Cut 4 Me (Mixtape)
- 2014 Y'akoto – Moody Blues
- 2014: Aṣa – The One That Never Comes
- 2014: Bok Bok feat. Kelela – Melba's Call
- 2014: P. Morris – Grace
- 2014: Moses Sumney – Scratch The Surface (feat. Mocky)
- 2015: Nils Wülker feat. Jill Scott – Worth The Wait
- 2015 Jesper Munk – Claim
- 2015 Denai Moore – Elsewhere
- 2015 Selah Sue – Reason
- 2015 Kelela – Hallucinogen EP
- 2015 Orgone – Beyond The Sun
- 2016 Nia Andrews – From Here
- 2016 L'Aupaire – Flowers
- 2016 Romans feat. Mary J. Blige – Overthinking
- 2016 Mr. Oizo – All Wet
- 2017 Feist – Pleasure
- 2017 Kelela – Take Me Apart
- 2017 Kid Fresino – Let Me In (Hair Cut)
- 2018 Joey Dosik – Inside Voice
- 2019 Benny Sings – Duplicate
- 2019 Nia Andrews – No Place Is Safe
- 2019 Def Sound – Tryin'
- 2020 Campanella – Amulue
- 2020 Scherazade – Asile Exquis
- 2020 Son Little – Aloha
- 2020 Austra – Hirodin
- 2021 Blectum From Blechdom – DeepBone
- 2021 Nia Andrews – Silly Boy Blue
- 2021 Pegasus Warning – Inspiration Equation
- 2021 Benny Sings feat. Marc Rebillet Cola Boyy – Beat100
- 2022 Feist – Multitudes
- 2023 Kelela – Raven
- 2024 Vulfmon - "It Might Have To Be You"
- 2025 G-Dragon "Take Me"

=== Remixes ===
- 2003: Isolée – "It's About"
- 2003: V.A. – "Cinemix"
- 2004: Husky Rescue – "Summertime Cowboy"
- 2004: Feist – "Mushaboom"
- 2005: Feist – "Inside and Out"
- 2006: Jamie Lidell – "What's the Use"
- 2006: Architecture in Helsinki – "Need to Shout"
- 2007: Young MC – "Bust a Move"
- 2008: Anita O'Day – "Tenderly" (Verve Remixed)
- 2010: Lagrimas De Soledad (No Existen Palabras) (Mocky Remix)
- 2011: Lateef The Truthspeaker – "Oakland" (Mocky Remix) ft. Del The Funky Homosapien & The Grouch
- 2015: Matthew Herbert – "Middle (Mocky Remix)"
- 2016: Oh Shu - Moebius (Mocky Remix)
- 2023: Benny Sings – Party (2023 Mocky Rework)
