= Dream a Garden =

2015 studio album by Jam City

Studio album by Jam City
- Released: 24 March 2015
- Recorded: 2014–2015
- Genres: Dream pop; electronic; psychedelia
- Length: 36:33
- Label: Night Slugs
- Producer: Jam City

Jam City chronology
Classical Curves (2012)	Dream a Garden (2015)	Pillowland (2020)

Singles from Dream a Garden
- 1. "Unhappy" Released: October 2014; 2. "Proud" Released: February 2015

Dream a Garden is the second studio album by British electronic music producer Jam City. It was released on 24 March 2015 by Night Slugs to positive reviews.

== Background ==
Inspired by the 2011 England riots and the work of bell hooks, Dream a Garden further develops the socio-political conscience of its predecessor, engaging particularly with the effects of neoliberalism. Latham has stated that the album "is about the personal effects of living under capitalism. Why do I feel shit and why do the people I love feel shit when they look at billboards? It was a process of trying to work through those feelings, that culture – what society values that makes you feel like you don’t measure up.” The first single from the album, "Unhappy", critiques corruptive elements of online porn.

The album largely abandons the stark, club-based sound of Latham's debut in favor of a warmer sonic palette characterized by "fuzzed-out beats and washes of reverb-drenched and processed guitar." Latham has described the sound as "not a total break from the world of Classical Curves, but rather an inversion," explaining that "Classical Curves is the surface, Dream a Garden is the exhaustion, frustration, anger, and dizziness underneath. Describing the development of Latham's sound for Clash, Will Salmon wrote that "this is still angular, defiantly awkward music, but the diamond-hard production has been replaced with something woozier and stranger. The synths have warped and melted, the beats – when they're there at all – are muffled and subdued." Regarding his decision to sing, Latham stated, “I pushed up against the point where I had to sing. You have to say it and be obvious about it sometimes."

== Critical reception ==
Professional ratings
Aggregate scores
Source	Rating
AnyDecentMusic?	7.3/10
Metacritic	78/100
Review scores
Source	Rating
AllMusic	4/5 stars
Clash	7/10
Dummy Mag	8/10
The Guardian	5/5 stars
The Observer	4/5 stars
Pitchfork	6.5/10
Resident Advisor	3.2/5
Tiny Mix Tapes	3.5/5 stars
Uncut	8/10

Dream a Garden received generally positive reviews from critics. The Guardian described the album as "strange and disorientating, idiosyncratic and frequently astonishing, a modern-day psychedelia that owes almost nothing to that genre’s hackneyed conventions and never forgets to temper the sublimity with darkness". Writing for Clash, Will Salmon described the album as "optimistic, romantic and frequently lovely record – a startling and deliberate contrast to its predecessor," and wrote that "the garden in this dream is a place of respite from the frightening truths of our increasingly dystopian, poverty-stricken reality." Despite a relatively positive review, The Wire opined that "Dream a Garden only starts to sound radical when it breaks the bounds of its songforms and an eerie melancholy steals in." The Observer described the album as "a slow, fragmentary work taking cues from drone and post-punk, with Latham’s vocals half-buried in layers of sound," writing that it "aims to create friction, to disrupt the party, even if it doesn’t force its message down your throat."

== Track listing ==
All songs written by Jam City.

No.	Title	Length
1.	"The Garden Thrives"	2:34
2.	"A Walk Down Chapel"	5:33
3.	"Unhappy"	3:37
4.	"Good Lads, Bad Lads"	2:32
5.	"Today"	4:07
6.	"Damage"	4:00
7.	"Crisis"	4:15
8.	"Black Friday"	4:55
9.	"Proud"	5:00

== Personnel ==
Adapted from Discogs.

- Jam City – performance, production, mixing
- Alex Sushon – mixing
- Liam Howe – engineer
