= Ahya Simone =

American singer-songwriter

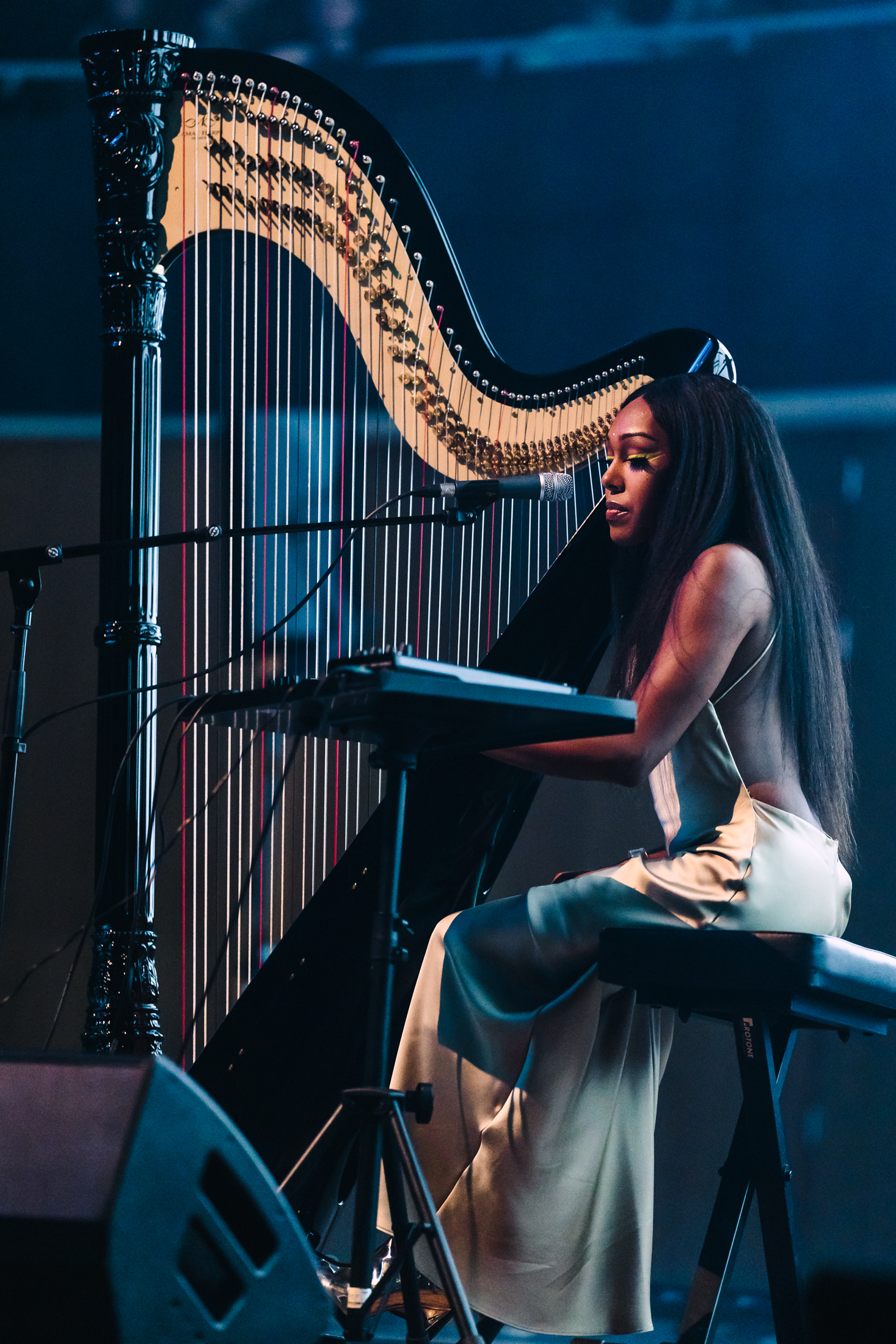

Ahya Simone (born September 4, 1992) is an American multidisciplinary artist. Based in Detroit, she is best known for her work as a harpist and for creating and starring in the web series pilot Femme Queen Chronicles.

== Early life and education ==
Simone was born and raised in Detroit, Michigan. She grew up singing in the church choir and started to play harp as a student at Cass Technical High School when she was 16.

While attending college at Wayne State University she came out as transgender. She was the principal harpist for the university's symphony.

== Career ==
=== Music ===
After college Simone sought out ways to perform outside her previous experience as a classical musician. She began to cover r&b and soul music, and named Dorothy Ashby and Alice Coltrane, and as one of her biggest influences. This led her to collaborate with fellow Detroiter dream hampton, to co-score hampton's short film Treasure (2018). Simone received a Kresge Artist Fellowship in 2018 and was the first Black trans woman recipient. That year she also teamed up with Kelela on Take Me a_Part, the Remixes.

In addition to her work as a harpist, Simone is a singer-songwriter whose music fuses r&b, jazz, experimental, and electronic. Simone released the single "Frostbite" in 2020. She later released a music video for the song featuring Detroit-based artists KESSWA and La Cecille, formerly known as Supercoolwicked. In 2021, she collaborated with cktrl on his single "mazes".

In 2025, Simone self-released her debut EP Neptunian Blue. She was also featured on Transa, a compilation album released by Red Hot Org in 2024.

Singles from Ahya Simone

1. "Frostbite" released June 2020
2. "Liminal" Feat. Tapiwa Svosve released December 31, 2024

Neptunian Blue EP

- Released: January 8, 2025
- Singles: Liminal feat. Tapiwa Svosve

=== Other work ===
In 2015 she co-founded the Trans Sistas of Color Project Detroit to provide support to trans women of color after the murder of Amber Monroe. Through the organization she launched the comedy web series pilot Femme Queen Chronicles that follows four trans women in Detroit, which she likened to Living Single and Chewing Gum. Simone developed the series in part to "disrupt the narrative of black tragedy without sanitizing the very real tragedies that happen to us." She is the director, writer, and stars in the series. Femme Queen Chronicles debuted in 2018 and received positive critical reception. She received

financial support from the Knight Foundation to develop the series. As of 2021, she is working with Janet Mock to adapt the show for television.
