= New Avatar =

Studio album by Kelela
- Released: July 10, 2026
- Studios: The Garage (Los Angeles); Studio K (New York); The Fly Trap (London); Big Mercy (New York); Baozheng (London); Paramount (Los Angeles)
- Genres: Alternative R&B; shoegaze; indie rock; electronic; grunge
- Length: 40:47
- Label: Warp
- Producer: Oscar Scheller

Kelela chronology
In the Blue Light (2025)	New Avatar (2026)

Singles from New Avatar
- 1. "Idea 1" Released: April 8, 2026; 2. "Linknb" Released: May 5, 2026; 3. "Point Blank" Released: June 1, 2026; 4. "Outta Time" Released: June 16, 2026; 5. "The Bridge" Released: July 7, 2026

New Avatar (stylized in all lowercase) is the third studio album by the American singer and songwriter Kelela. It was released on July 10, 2026, via Warp Records.The album was preceded by the singles "Idea 1", "Linknb", "Point Blank", "Outta Time" and "The Bridge". Album features guest appearances by A. K. Paul, Fousheé, and PinkPantheress.

== Background ==
New Avatar draws from everywhere Kelela has "lived musically", resulting in a sound described as "R&B run through distorted guitar" as well as elements of dance music. Kelela stated that the album "finds solace in confronting" and does not seek to distract from what is happening in the world, but instead to "make sense in this crazy moment", with the hope of helping listeners reconnect with the "beauty and joy" they could experience.

== Composition ==
New Avatar marks a stylistic departure from the electronic R&B of Kelela's previous work by drawing on her early experiences in the Washington, D.C., indie music scene. The album incorporates elements of alternative R&B, shoegaze, grunge, indie rock, and electronic music, while maintaining aspects of the experimental electronic sound that has characterized much of her discography.

DJ Mag similarly described the record as drawing from indie rock, shoegaze, and grunge while retaining ties to her experimental club and electronic sound.

Reviewing the album, Resident Advisor wrote that New Avatar "reconfigures shoegaze, IDM and R&B into a Black, femme sound of the future", noting its fusion of distorted guitars with electronic production and contemporary R&B songwriting. In its review of the lead single "Idea 1", Pitchfork's Kiana Mickles highlighted the prominence of shoegaze guitar textures and identified the song as signalling a return to Kelela's rock and indie influences.

== Singles ==
Following the release of her first live album, In the Blue Light, in 2025, and a social media blackout in March 2026, the singer returned with original material on April 8, 2026, releasing the lead single "Idea 1". Produced by Oscar Scheller, the "guitar-driven" indie rock and shoegaze track explores "what it feels like to exist in this climate" and was written by Kelela while she was reading Parable of the Sower. The song received critical acclaim, earning "Best New Track" from Pitchfork, among other praise.

The album was announced on May 5, 2026, alongside the release of its second single, "Linknb". Also produced by Scheller, the track was built around "a busy Mk.gee-like guitar figure". "Point Blank", the album's third single, was released on June 1, 2026. The album's fourth single, a collaboration with A. K. Paul titled "Outta Time", was released on June 16, 2026. The album's final single, "The Bridge" with PinkPantheress, was released on July 7, 2026. A music video for the single was released on July 10, 2026, alongside the album.

== Critical reception ==
New Avatar ratings
Aggregate scores
Source	Rating
AnyDecentMusic?	7.9/10
Metacritic	86/100
Review scores
Source	Rating
AllMusic	4/5 stars
Clash	8/10
Financial Times	4/5 stars
The Line of Best Fit	8/10
NME	4/5 stars
Paste	A−
The Quietus	8/10
Resident Advisor	90/100
The Skinny	4/5 stars
Slant	4/5 stars

New Avatar was met with widespread critical acclaim. At Metacritic, which assigns a rating out of 100 to reviews from professional publications, the album received a weighted average score of 86, based on fourteen reviews, indicating "universal acclaim". Aggregator AnyDecentMusic? gave it 7.9 out of 10 from twelve reviews.

Reviewers widely praised New Avatar for expanding Kelela's established alternative R&B sound through the incorporation of shoegaze, indie rock, electronic music, and jazz influences. Paul Simpson of AllMusic described the album as a "full-circle moment", while Jesse Dorris of Resident Advisor wrote that Kelela "reconfigures shoegaze, IDM and R&B into a Black, femme sound of the future". Kate French-Morris of The Quietus felt that the record demonstrated "that R&B vocals and guitar music can and do belong together", and the Financial Times praised Kelela's ability to move between jazz, indie rock, and electronic music while maintaining a consistent artistic identity.

Critics also highlighted the album's cohesion despite its broad sonic palette. Robin Murray of Clash described New Avatar as "cohesive and fully-realised", adding that it was "both new Kelela and classic Kelela, all at once". Tony Inglis of The Skinny considered the album a more streamlined work than Raven, while Paul Attard of Slant praised its intimate production and the combination of trip hop, neo soul, gothic rock, and funk influences. Marie Hascoët of The Line of Best Fit similarly commended the album's blend of experimentation and accessibility.

Kelela's vocal performances and songwriting also received widespread acclaim. Eric Bennett of Paste described New Avatar as "the sound of an artist with nothing left to prove", calling it "one of the best pop albums of the year". Kyann-Sian Williams of NME wrote that the album "stretches her sound into new territory", while Simpson concluded that it was Kelela's "darkest, moodiest release to date", one that "uniquely manages to be tough as well as comforting".

== Track listing ==
Credits are adapted from the album's liner notes.

New Avatar track listing
No.	Title	Writer(s)	Producer(s)	Length
1.	"Idea 1"	Kelela Mizanekristos; Oscar Scheller; Janiva Ellis	Scheller	3:25
2.	"Point Blank"	Mizanekristos; Scheller	Scheller	4:26
3.	"Goin Down"	Mizanekristos; Scheller; Brittany Fousheé	Scheller; Kelela^{[a]}	3:20
4.	"Outta Time" (featuring A. K. Paul)	Mizanekristos; A. K. Paul; Jessica Chambliss	Paul	4:11
5.	"Against Me"	Mizanekristos; Scheller	Scheller; Kelela^{[a]}	2:40
6.	"Crystalize"	Mizanekristos; Scheller	Scheller; Kelela^{[a]}	4:11
7.	"Retaliation Lullaby"	Mizanekristos; Scheller; Ellis	Scheller	3:07
8.	"Linknb"	Mizanekristos; Scheller	Scheller	1:55
9.	"Don't Piss Me Off"	Mizanekristos; Scheller; Mischa Notcutt	Scheller	3:30
10.	"New Life Forms" (featuring Fousheé)	Mizanekristos; Scheller; Fousheé	Scheller	3:24
11.	"The Bridge" (featuring PinkPantheress)	Mizanekristos; Scheller; PinkPantheress	Scheller	3:53
12.	"If We Meet Again"	Mizanekristos; Scheller	Scheller	2:45

=== Note ===
- ^{^[a]} signifies an additional producer

=== Sample credits ===
- "Linknb" incorporates samples from:
  - "Niggas Comin' Clean", written by Jordan Houston and Paul D. Beauregard, and performed by La Chat;
  - "It's on for the '94", written and performed by Kingpin Skinny Pimp (Derrick Hill)
- "Don't Piss Me Off" incorporates samples from "You Know What", written by Craig David and Mark Hill, and performed by Craig David

== Personnel ==
Credits are adapted from the album's liner notes and Tidal.

- Kelela – mixing (all tracks), vocal recording (tracks 1, 8), executive production
- Joe LaPorta – mastering
- Oscar Scheller – vocal recording (1–3, 5, 6, 8–12); PinkPantheress vocal arrangement and production (11)
- Scarlet House – additional guitar (1)
- Zion Russell – vocal recording (2, 3, 5, 7, 9–12)
- A. K. Paul – vocal recording (4)
- Chris Kasych – vocal engineering (4)
- Kezia Claire Warioba – additional background vocals (8)
- PinkPantheress – PinkPantheress vocal recording (11)
- Nickie Jon Pabón – PinkPantheress vocal engineering (11)
- Yasser Abubeker – creative direction
- Seenahm Suriyasat – design
- Neva Wireko – photography

== Charts ==
Chart performance for New Avatar
Chart (2026)	Peak position
Australian Albums (ARIA)	61
Belgian Albums (Ultratop Flanders)	138
Scottish Albums (Official Charts)	79
Portuguese Streaming Albums (AFP)	191
UK Albums Sales (Official Charts)	51
UK Independent Albums (Official Charts)	15
UK R&B Albums (Official Charts)	2
US Top Album Sales (Billboard)	34
