= LMK =

2017 single by Kelela

Single by Kelela

from the album Take Me Apart
- Released: August 1, 2017
- Genre: Electro-R&B
- Length: 3:38
- Label: Warp
- Songwriter(s): Kelela; Jeremiah Jerry; Asma Maroof
- Producer(s): Jam City; Kwes (add.)

Kelela singles chronology
"Rewind" (2015)	"LMK" (2017)	"Frontline" (2017)

Music video
- "LMK" on YouTube

"LMK" (initialism for "Let Me Know") is a song by American singer and songwriter Kelela. It was released on August 1, 2017 through Warp Records as the lead single from her debut studio album, Take Me Apart (2017).

== Composition ==
"LMK" is an electro-R&B track which revolves around "a wobbly, three-note synth-bass" with Kelela singing about a "potential one-night-stand." The bass-heavy and industrial production was handled by Jam City. Briana Younger of Pitchfork noted that Jam City's "pristine soundscape, while more minimal than what Kelela usually sings over, complements her well with its blend of space-age clubbiness and sultry R&B. It makes for what is probably her most pop-accessible song to date, an empowered and liberating song that asserts not just a woman's agency, but also Kelela's power as an artist."

== Release and promotion ==
"LMK" premiered on Zane Lowe's Beats 1 show on August 1, 2017, and subsequently released for digital download and streaming. Kelela told The Fader that the song is "directed at a man who's being weird instead of being honest. Does casual have to be careless? Is wifey the only woman who deserves your respect, and why do you think I want more when I demand it? These are my questions..."

On October 10, 2017, Kelela performed the song live for the first time on Later... with Jools Holland.

== Critical reception ==
"LMK" appeared on numerous year-end lists, topping Dummy Mag's list and appearing in the top 10 of lists by Vulture, The Quietus, Stereogum, Slant Magazine, Noisey and Highsnobiety.

== Music video ==
The music video for "LMK" was uploaded to Kelela's Vevo channel on August 9, 2017. Directed by longtime Björk collaborator Andrew Thomas Huang, the video is "a surreal visual that sees Kelela moving through hazy, club-like environments with authority and a take-no-prisoners attitude." Regarding the video, Huang said: "We wanted make a video that showcases the multiplicity of who Kelela is and who she has the potential to be. The video is essentially a grand unveiling featuring Kelela wearing different wigs and guises as she pushes through the club with her friends, ultimately revealing herself at the end of the video. The message of this video is empowerment: it's for the girls, for anyone whose heart has been trampled on and deserves to go out and feel good about themselves. It's a call to action, demanding to be taken and to be quick about it. This is the reason why we love Kelela - she's making herself vulnerable and kicking down doors in the process."

== "LMK (What's Really Good)" remix ==
"LMK (What's Really Good)"

Single by Kelela

from the album Take Me a_Part, the Remixes
- Released: September 12, 2018
- Length: 5:21
- Label: Warp
- Songwriter(s): Kelela; Jeremiah Jerry; Asma Maroof

Kelela singles chronology
"Blue Light" (2017)	"LMK (What's Really Good)" (2018)	"Kaytranada_Waitin_115 Bpm" (2018)

Princess Nokia singles chronology
"Soul Train" (2017)	"LMK (What's Really Good)" (2018)

Junglepussy singles chronology
"Trader Joe" (2018)	"LMK (What's Really Good)" (2018)

Cupcakke singles chronology
"Blackjack" (2018)	"LMK (What's Really Good)" (2018)	"Dangled" (2018)

Ms. Boogie singles chronology
"LMK (What's Really Good)" (2018)

A remix titled "LMK (What's Really Good)" featuring Princess Nokia, Junglepussy, Cupcakke and Ms. Boogie (Note: Stylized as "LMK_WHAT'S REALLY GOOD REMIX_ FEAT_PRINCESS NOKIA_JUNGLEPUSSY_CUPCAKKE_MS. BOOGIE_100 BPM") was released on September 12, 2018. It serves as the first single from the remix album Take Me a_Part, the Remixes (2018).
