= Take Me a Part, the Remixes =

Take Me a_Part, the Remixes

Remix album by Kelela
- Released: October 5, 2018
- Length: 79:56
- Label: Warp
- Producer: Kelela (exec.); Asma Maroof (exec.); Santa Muerte; Kaytranada; Lsdxoxo; Ethereal; DJ Lag; Rare Essence; Joey Labeija; Serpentwithfeet; Tre Oh Fie; Nídia; Divoli S'vere; Badsista; Mountain; Gaika; Hitmakerchinx; Skyshaker; Kareem Lotfy; Nathaniel W. James; Dave Quam; Ahya Simone

Kelela chronology
Take Me Apart (2017)	Take Me a_Part, the Remixes (2018)	Raven (2023)

Singles from Take Me a_Part, the Remixes
- 1. "LMK (What's Really Good)" Released: September 12, 2018; 2. "Kaytranada_Waitin_115 Bpm" Released: September 26, 2018

Take Me a_Part, the Remixes (stylized in all caps) is a remix album by American singer and songwriter Kelela, released on October 5, 2018. The album consists of reworkings of songs from Kelela's debut studio album, Take Me Apart (2017), from DJs and producers such as Kaytranada, Rare Essence, Serpentwithfeet, and more.

== Release ==
The album was announced on September 12, 2018, alongside the "LMK (What's Really Good)" remix featuring Princess Nokia, Junglepussy, Cupcakke and Ms. Boogie. The album was released on October 5, 2018, making it one year since the release of Take Me Apart. Kelela contributed new vocals to several of the tracks, with the goal of creating "something far more evolved than the average remix collection."

In a press release, Kelela stated:

This project has been evolving in my mind since I was deep in recording Take Me Apart. I obsessed over production choices on the album and my only solace was knowing that the songs would be reimagined in this way [...] so, it's not just a bunch of remixes...it's how my worldwide community of producers and DJs communicate through difference. It's also about the camaraderie that we experience when we find the overlaps. The same songs get to exist in these alternate realities which means different people get to have a relationship with the music. Maybe even with each other.

On September 26, Kelela released Kaytranada's remix of "Waitin" as the second single from the album.

== Critical reception ==
Professional ratings
Review scores
Source	Rating
The Line of Best Fit	8/10

Simon Edwards of The Line of Best Fit said, "Take Me a_Part, the Remixes isn't your ordinary remix album. It's a testament to Kelela's knowledge, taste, and love for underground music," and noted that the album "swerves between house, R&B, juke, gqom and more – spinning you across dancefloors from countries all over the world." Edwards concluded his review writing, "This eclectic mix could be disorientating in the wrong hands, but with Kelela and Asmara at the helm, they somehow manage to create an untold thread that binds all these tracks together. Kelela's deep involvement with the project shows just how committed to her vision she is. Her music is precious, and anyone who wants to step to her sound, better be able to make sure they can hit her high standards. Luckily, Kelela has some pretty talented friends."

== Track listing ==
Take Me a_Part, the Remixes
No.	Title	Producer(s)	Length
1.	"Santa Muerte_Bluff_94 Bpm"	Santa Muerte	3:18
2.	"Kaytranada_Waitin_115 Bpm"	Kaytranada	5:04
3.	"Lsdxoxo_Truth Or Dare_123 Bpm"	LSDXOXO	4:53
4.	"Ethereal_Jupiter_97 Bpm"	Ethereal	2:39
5.	"Dj Lag_Onanon_127 Bpm"	DJ Lag	4:10
6.	"Rare Essence_Tma_83 Bpm"	Rare Essence	3:39
7.	"Joey Labeija_Better_107 Bpm"	Joey Labeija	3:30
8.	"Serpentwithfeet_Altadena _88 Bpm"	Serpentwithfeet	3:22
9.	"Lmk_What's Really Good Remix_ feat_Princess Nokia_Junglepussy_Cupcakke_Ms. Boogie_100 Bpm"		5:20
10.	"Tre Oh Fie_Waitin_150 Bpm"	Tre Oh Fie	2:39
11.	"Nídia_Blue Light_123 Bpm"	Nídia	3:05
12.	"Divoli S'vere_Truth Or Dare_130 Bpm"	Divoli S'vere	2:48
13.	"Badsista_feat_Linn Da Quebrada_Better_125 Bpm"	Badsista	4:09
14.	"Mountain_Lmk_130 Bpm"	Mountain	4:00
15.	"Gaika_Frontline_141 Bpm"	Gaika	5:39
16.	"Hitmakerchinx_Blue Light_108 Bpm"	Hitmakerchinx	2:44
17.	"Skyshaker_Onanon_129 Bpm"	Skyshaker	4:39
18.	"Kareem Lotfy_Turn to Dust_No Bpm"	Kareem Lotfy	3:08
19.	"Nathaniel W. James & Dave Quam_Waitin_122 Bpm"	Nathaniel W. James; Dave Quam	4:46
20.	"Ahya Simone_Enough_No Bpm"	Ahya Simone	6:24
Total length:			79:56

Notes

- All tracks are stylized in all caps.

== Personnel ==
Credits adapted from the description of the "LMK (What's Really Good)" video on YouTube.

- Kelela – executive production, executive mixing
- Asma Maroof – executive production, executive mixing
- Chris Kasych – engineering, mixing
- Gabriel Schuman – engineering, mixing
- Geoffrey Jerrell – engineering, mixing
- Knice Da Maje – engineering, mixing
