= Saint Heron =

Compilation album by Various artists
- Released: November 11, 2013
- Recorded: 2013
- Genres: Alternative R&B; soul; dream pop
- Length: 47:08
- Label: Saint Records

Saint Heron is a compilation album released by Solange Knowles' record label, Saint Records, on November 11, 2013. It features the original recordings of several contemporary R&B artists, including Knowles (who also curated the project), Jhené Aiko, Cassie, BC Kingdom, Jade De LaFleur, Kelela, Kingdom, Petite Noir, Iman Omari, Sampha, India Shawn and Starchild. The intent of the album was to "feature, highlight and align a new movement of contemporary, genre-defying R&B visionaries" and to serve as a "segue into the diverse evolution of these independent artists as they share their voices and words as only they can – through pure, unadulterated music."

== Background and release ==
On May 14, 2013, Solange Knowles revealed that she had launched her own record label named Saint Records, which she would be using to release her third full-length album and future music projects distributed through Sony. On October 22, 2013, Knowles announced the first release from her label, a compilation called Saint Heron, featuring twelve original songs from a list of "very contemporary left-of-center R&B artists," including Cassie, Sampha, Jhené Aiko, Petite Noir, BC Kingdom, and Knowles herself among others. The first song to be released from the project was "Go All Night," by American singer and songwriter Kelela, which had been teased on her 2013 Cut 4 Me mixtape. The artwork for Saint Heron was conceptualized and created by media artist Rashaad Newsome. The release was preceded by the opening of the label's official website, which was then updated with various music news and interviews about the album. The compilation was available digitally, on vinyl, and on CD on November 12, 2013.

Talking about the project's concept for Billboard, Knowles stated: "Honestly everyone I've had on Saint Heron I've been a fan of for awhile now, and have been introduced to their music either from friends or this kind of assembling from across the internet. And really I just kinda wanted to celebrate these awesome, sometimes overlooked, incredibly gifted R&B artists and have them come together and celebrate the art form and the diversity of the art form," expressing her desire to make it a cohesive record while "individually everyone sort of interpreted rhythm and blues in a very different way from artist to artist." To promote the release, Knowles hosted a launch party and trunk show at retail space, showroom, and gallery Opening Ceremony in Soho, New York City. "I really wanted to make a record you can smoke to," Knowles said, while claiming curating the track listing was "definitely a creatively fulfilling experience. All of the artists on this compilation are so extremely talented and are really defying the genre of R&B in their own ways. And the songs are all so unique but still flow together as one body of work. I love how airy and experimental it gets." The track "Indo" also marks Knowles’ first full solo production credit.

== Critical reception ==
Professional ratings
Aggregate scores
Source	Rating
Metacritic	75/100
Review scores
Source	Rating
Exclaim!	7/10 stars
NOW Magazine	4/5 stars
Pitchfork	8.1/10
Rolling Stone	3/5 stars
Spin	8/10 stars

Saint Heron received positive reviews from contemporary critics. At Metacritic, which assigns a normalized rating out of 100 to reviews from mainstream critics, the album received an average score of 75. Miles Raymer of Pitchfork gave the album an 8.1 rating out of 10, commenting, "It may have taken her a while to get to the point where she can pull such a gesture off, but in this insurgent territory, Solange reigns supreme." Ryan B. Patrick of Exclaim! wrote: "Saint Heron is a statement, a musical manifesto with a collaborative vision for today's R&B."

Anupa Mistry of Spin remarked that "What's interesting about Saint Heron is that it trips giddily over the line between relatively conventional approaches and more heavily processed, speculative stuff, but takes no pains to make an overarching statement," while Will Hermes of Rolling Stone noted the album "can verge on its own kind of formula, but high points are high." At Now, Holly Mackenzie stated, "The first release under eclectic singer/songwriter Solange Knowles's boutique label, Saint Records, the younger Knowles weaves a collection of alt-R&B songs together seamlessly." Stacy-Ann Ellis of Vibe added, "The compilation is a definite breathe of fresh air; a true break from the trap and twerk tracks we've been bouncing to lately. The album flows with lyrical lounge music and mellow melodies—the perfect sexy time score or hookah-huffing soundtrack." Aimee Cliff of Dummy Mag gave the album eight out of ten, saying "While the album sometimes suffers for its lack of direction, it's surely only because so many directions are posed by this collection of forward- and sideways-thinking tracks." Clare Considine of The Guardian praised the project, "a beguiling compilation bursting with originality," applauding the movement of singers lyrically "freeing themselves from the clichéd roles attributed to them by male writers." Centric ranked Saint Heron at number one on their "13 Best R&B/Soul Mixtapes & EPs of 2013" year-end list.

== Track listing ==
No.	Title	Artist	Length
1.	"Lockup"	BC Kingdom	4:02
2.	"Jaded"	Jade De LaFleur	3:28
3.	"Bank Head" (featuring Kelela)	Kingdom	4:17
4.	"Go All Night"	Kelela	3:57
5.	"Energy"	Iman Omari	4:01
6.	"Beneath the Tree"	Sampha	3:48
7.	"Noirse" (Pional Remix)	Petite Noir	4:04
8.	"Relax"	Starchild	2:36
9.	"Indo"	Cassie	5:09
10.	"I'm Alive"	India Shawn	2:38
11.	"Drinking and Driving"	Jhené Aiko	3:54
12.	"Cash In"	Solange	5:14
Total length:			47:08

== Credits and personnel ==
Credits adapted from AllMusic.

- Daniel Aged – mixing
- Jhené Aiko – composer, primary artist
- Tim Anderson – producer
- Ken Barrientos – mixing
- Mikaelin Bluespruce – engineer, mixing
- Jim Caruana – engineer, mixing
- Cassie – primary artist
- Christopher Cummings – composer
- Anthony Daniel – mixing
- Dot da Genius – producer
- Geoff Gibbs – engineer
- Corey Gibson – composer, engineer, vocal producer
- Jade J – composer, primary artist
- Kelela – composer, featured artist, primary artist
- John Roderick Key Jr. – composer, producer
- Kingdom – composer, engineer, mixing, primary artist, producer
- BC Kingdom – primary artist, producer
- Solange Knowles – composer, primary artist, producer
- Lord RAJA – engineer, producer
- Micahfonecheck – vocals
- Prem Midha – engineer, mixing
- Morri$ – producer
- Rashaad Newsome – artwork
- Iman Omari – composer, primary artist, producer
- Petite Noir – composer, primary artist, producer
- Pional – producer, remixing
- Sampha – composer, engineer, mixing, primary artist, producer
- Eric Scoggins – composer
- India Shawn – composer, primary artist, producer
- Jonathan Simone – engineer, mixing, producer
- Starchild & the New Romantic – composer, primary artist, producer
- VHVL – producer
- Rommel Nino Villanueva – engineer, mixing
- Patrick Wimberly – mixing

== Charts ==
Chart (2013)	Peak position
US Independent Albums (Billboard)	39
US Top R&B Albums (Billboard)	35

== Release history ==
Region	Date	Format	Label	Ref.
United States	November 11, 2013	Digital download; CD; LP	Saint Records	
