= Take Me Apart =

Studio album by Kelela
- Released: October 6, 2017
- Studios: Heavy Duty, Burbank; Mutant, London; Rooftop, London
- Genres: Electro-R&B; alternative R&B; electronica
- Length: 53:46
- Label: Warp
- Producers: Ariel Rechtshaid; Jam City; Arca; Bok Bok; Dubbel Dutch; Kingdom; Kwes; Asma Maroof; Mocky; Aaron David Ross; Al Shux; Loric Sih; Terror Danjah; Nick Weiss

Kelela chronology
Hallucinogen (2015)	Take Me Apart (2017)	Take Me a_Part, the Remixes (2018)

Singles from Take Me Apart
- 1. "LMK" Released: August 1, 2017; 2. "Frontline" Released: September 4, 2017; 3. "Waitin" Released: October 3, 2017; 4. "Blue Light" Released: October 4, 2017

Take Me Apart is the debut studio album by American singer and songwriter Kelela. It was released on October 6, 2017, through Warp. Combining electronic music and R&B, the album was noted for its futuristic sound and its incorporation of various musical styles. Kelela worked on the album for four years with producers she had previously collaborated with on her previous releases, Cut 4 Me (2013) and Hallucinogen (2015).

The album received widespread acclaim from music critics, many of whom commended its innovative production and Kelela's sharp songwriting and vocal delivery. It appeared on several publications' lists of the year's best albums. The album was supported by the singles "LMK", "Frontline", "Waitin" and "Blue Light".

== Development and production ==
Kelela worked on Take Me Apart for four years, alongside Arca and Jam City, whom she had previously worked with on Hallucinogen and Cut 4 Me respectively. She stated that they "anchored" the album and produced the bulk of it. On February 18, 2016, Kelela featured on a short film by Dazed named "Interlude", which contained new material that would later turn out to be snippets of tracks included in the album. In a press release, Kelela explained that the album expresses "an honest vision of how we navigate dissolving ties with each other and yet remain sanguine for the next chance at love," continuing: "despite it being a personal record, the politics of my identity informs how it sounds and how I choose to articulate my vulnerability and strength. I am a black woman, a second-generation Ethiopian-American, who grew up in the 'burbs listening to R&B, jazz and Björk. All of it comes out in one way or another."

== Composition ==
The music of Take Me Apart was described as electro-R&B and alternative R&B, with several critics noting its incorporation of various other musical styles, including electronica, jazz, soul, UK garage and dance-pop. The Guardian described the album as "glitchy R&B", while also stating that the album offers "tracks that are both pop-minded and gratifyingly future-facing." Clash labeled it as "cavernous, avant-garde R&B that moves the body and heals the broken heart." Fact called the album "a genre-melding journey," and said it has "a subtle, playful Afro-futurist vision." DIY noted the usage of "glacial synths" and "trap beats," in contrast to Consequence of Sound who commended the producers for "their refusal to use trap as a crutch." The Skinny added that the album differs from the "heavy, industrial beats" from Kelela's previous releases, despite many of the same producers appearing on this album. The album was also said to evoke the music of Janet Jackson and Björk, whom Kelela named as influences. Lyrically, the album deals with various themes, such as love, romance, sex, impatience, vulnerability, the rewards and pitfalls of relationships, and "the complicated things that can happen when complicated people try to understand each other."

The album's tracks were produced by a number of different producers including Jam City, Arca, Bok Bok, Kingdom, Dubbel Dutch, Al Shux and Ariel Rechtshaid. All tracks were mixed by Kwes, and vocals were recorded and engineered by Chris Kasych.

== Release and promotion ==
The title of the album was announced on July 14, 2017. The cover art was revealed two weeks later, with the album being made available for pre-order the following day alongside the release of "LMK". A tour in support of the album was announced later that month. It kicked off in September and includes dates in North America and Europe, as well as three dates in Australia with the xx and Earl Sweatshirt in January 2018.

On October 27, 2017, Kelela shared a trailer of an upcoming film in support of the album titled "All It Took", directed and produced by Wu Tsang.

=== Singles ===
The lead single, "LMK", was released on August 1, alongside the pre-order of the album. The song premiered on Zane Lowe's Beats 1 show.

"Frontline" was premiered on September 4 on the HBO series Insecure, and was later released for digital download and streaming services as the album's second single. The Fader said that in the song Kelela is "leaving behind someone who was holding her back, and she's not looking to apologize. It's not a cold track, though, but one about how certain significant decisions can be made easier with a strong knowledge of self-worth." An animated music video for the song was released on February 28, 2018.

"Waitin" was released as the third single on October 3, and "Blue Light" was released the following day as the fourth single. A music video for the song was released on November 7.

=== Take Me a_Part, the Remixes ===
On September 12, 2018, announced a remix album titled Take Me a_Part, the Remixes alongside the "LMK (What's Really Good)" remix featuring Princess Nokia, Junglepussy, Cupcakke, Linn da Quebrada and Ms. Boogie. The album was released on October 5, making it one year since the release of Take Me Apart. It features contributions from Kaytranada, Rare Essence, Serpentwithfeet and more.

== Critical reception ==
Professional ratings
Aggregate scores
Source	Rating
AnyDecentMusic?	7.9/10
Metacritic	84/100
Review scores
Source	Rating
AllMusic	5/5 stars
The A.V. Club	B
The Guardian	4/5 stars
The Irish Times	4/5 stars
Mixmag	9/10
NME	4/5 stars
The Observer	4/5 stars
Pitchfork	8.6/10
Q	4/5 stars
Rolling Stone	3.5/5 stars

At Metacritic, which assigns a normalized rating out of 100 to reviews from mainstream publications, the album received an average score of 84, based on 23 reviews, indicating "widespread critical acclaim". Stereogum awarded it as their album of the week, with Tom Breihan deeming it as "a towering achievement of an album." Treble Zine also labeled it as the album of the week, with Jackie Im stating: "Underlying is a desire to privilege her own voice, which is a lot of what makes Kelela's music so urgent." The New York Times critic Jon Pareles wrote, "The songs are intricately plotted to give the illusion of being impulsive and obsessive, buffeted by shifting emotions: by turns sensual and wary, vulnerable and guarded, leisurely and urgent." Kyle Mullin of Exclaim! praised the album, stating that "Take Me Apart is a subtle, sexy LP from a woman who knows what she wants, and clearly aims to write anthems for fans feeling the same way." Maura Johnston of Rolling Stone described the album as "forward-thinking R&B," and called it "restlessly innovative."

NME's Nick Levine said "nothing about this lush and accomplished album suggests Kelela is an artist who wants to repeat herself." Julianne Escobedo Shepherd of Pitchfork said that Kelela "might be singing about different partners, but it's the value and dignity she gives to her feelings that provides the true backdrop on Take Me Apart. In the process of setting out to solidify her own sound, Kelela has finally fallen for herself." The Skinny's Nadia Younes wrote, "Take Me Apart may not appear as immediately interesting and unique as her previous work but there are layers upon layers of elements to be explored, digested and, ironically enough, taken apart." Rachel Aroesti from The Guardian said "Kelela's vocal stops Take Me Apart ending up as a fragmented series of sounds: consistently exquisite as it dances between lovesick confusion and shrewd sensuality." Spin's Brian Josephs wrote, "Kelela proudly stands within the genre's tradition. For the most part, she avoids making any grandstanding romantic or political statements, but Take Me Apart finds its purpose within the subdued complexities."

AllMusic's Andy Kellman compared it favorably to its predecessor, claiming "Like Cut 4 Me, Take Me Apart is predominantly electronic and progressive R&B, one moment as dreamlike and fevered as an intense courtship, then as startling and chilling as a breakup. It's more composed, less pieced together, with mixtape and EP collaborators Jam City, Ariel Rechtshaid, and Arca primary among a comparatively supplemental and mostly new crew of associates. This also comes across more as a work of in-person interaction than one of distanced communication." In his rave review for Spectrum Culture, Jake Cole wrote Kelela "gave the impression of immediately finding her groove with cutting edge electronic backing, sharp songwriting and a powerful voice. Yet the leap from Cut 4 Me and Hallucinogen to Take Me Apart is as impressive in its own way as the growth toward Homogenic. Though technically Kelela's full-length debut, the album feels like a next step, proof that her striking sound was no mere gimmick but instead the foundation for one of the most advanced, daring artists in contemporary pop. By the time her emotional journey crests with the hopeful closer "Altadena," Kelela gives the impression not only of being more secure in love but in her own skin, firmly on the same wavelength with her collaborators, more capable than ever of pushing boundaries with her work."

=== Accolades ===
Publication	Accolade	Rank	Ref.
AllMusic	AllMusic's Best Albums of 2017	—N/a	
Billboard	50 Best Albums of 2017	11	
Clash	Albums of the Year	12	
Complex	Top 50 Albums of 2017	17	
Complex UK	Best Albums of 2017	6	
Consequence of Sound	Top 50 Albums of 2017	11	
Cosmopolitan	Best Albums of 2017	4	
Crack Magazine	Top 100 albums of 2017	21	
Dazed	The 20 Best Albums of 2017	6	
Drowned in Sound	Favourite Albums of 2017	88	
Dummy Mag	The 10 Best Albums of 2017	2	
Entertainment Weekly	The 25 Best Albums of 2017	11	
Exclaim!	Top 10 Soul and R&B Albums of 2017	4	
Fuse	The 20 Best Albums of 2017	16	
Gorilla vs. Bear	Gorilla vs. Bear's Albums of 2017	42	
The Guardian	The Best Albums of 2017	9	
Highsnobiety	The 25 Best Albums of 2017	6	
Interview	The 10 Best Albums of 2017	7	
Junkee	The 10 Best Albums of 2017	5	
Mashable	Favorite Albums of 2017	6	
Noisey	The 100 Best Albums of 2017	8	
Now	The 10 Best Albums of 2017	4	
Pitchfork	The 50 Best Albums of 2017	4	
PopMatters	The 60 Best Albums of 2017	8	
The Quietus	Albums of the Year 2017	6	
Rough Trade	Albums of the Year 2017	19	
The Skinny	Top 50 Albums of 2017	48	
Spectrum Culture	Top 20 Albums of 2017	18	
Spin	50 Best Albums of 2017	15	
Stereogum	The 50 Best Albums of 2017	26	
Uproxx	50 Best Albums of 2017	38	
Vulture	The 10 Best Albums of 2017	7	

== Track listing ==
No.	Title	Writer(s)	Producer(s)	Length
1.	"Frontline"	Kelela Mizanekristos; Jeremiah Raisen; Samuel Dew; William Boston	Jam City	5:39
2.	"Waitin"	Mizanekristos; Dominic Salole; Dean Bein	Jam City; Ariel Rechtshaid^{[a]}; Kwes^{[a]}	3:15
3.	"Take Me Apart"	Mizanekristos; Salole; Alexander Shuckburgh; Jordan Asher Cruz	Al Shux; Jam City; Rechtshaid^{[a]}; Arca^{[a]}; Loric Sih^{[a]}; Kwes^{[a]}	4:02
4.	"Enough"	Mizanekristos; Salole	Arca; Rechtshaid^{[a]}; Kwes^{[a]}	5:09
5.	"Jupiter"	Mizanekristos; Romy Madley Croft	Aaron David Ross; Nick Weiss^{[a]}	2:05
6.	"Better"	Mizanekristos; Salole; Croft	Mocky; Bok Bok; Rechtshaid; Kwes^{[a]}	4:26
7.	"LMK"	Mizanekristos; Raisen; Asma Maroof	Jam City; Kwes^{[a]}	3:38
8.	"Truth or Dare"	Mizanekristos; Talay Riley; Maroof; Boston	Jam City; Kwes^{[a]}	4:12
9.	"S.O.S."	Mizanekristos	Kingdom	2:22
10.	"Blue Light"	Mizanekristos; Dew; Maroof; Nia Andrews; Alexander Sushon	Dubbel Dutch; Bok Bok^{[a]}; Rechtshaid^{[a]}; Terror Danjah^{[a]}; Maroof^{[a]}	3:36
11.	"Onanon"	Mizanekristos; Jay Prince; Alejandra Ghersi	Arca; Rechtshaid^{[a]}	4:31
12.	"Turn to Dust"	Mizanekristos; Croft; Jack Latham; Ghersi	Arca; Kwes^{[a]}	4:29
13.	"Bluff"	Mizanekristos; Boston	Jam City	1:12
14.	"Altadena"	Mizanekristos; Sabina Sciubba; Salole; Boston	Jam City; Rechtshaid^{[a]}; Kwes^{[a]}	5:10
Total length:				53:46

Notes

- ^{^[a]} signifies an additional producer

== Personnel ==
Credits adapted from the liner notes of Take Me Apart.

- Kelela – vocals, executive production
- Ariel Rechtshaid – production (track 6), additional production (tracks 2–4, 10, 11, 14), executive production
- Arca – production (tracks 4, 11, 12), additional production (track 3)
- Jam City – production (tracks 1–3, 7, 8, 13, 14), executive production
- Jessica Chambliss – background vocal arrangement and vocal production (tracks 3, 4, 6, 9–12, 14), background vocals (track 14)
- Kwes – mixing, additional production and instrumentation (tracks 2–4, 6–8, 12, 14)
- Bok Bok – production (track 6), additional production (track 10)
- Dubbel Dutch – production (track 10)
- Kingdom – production (track 9)
- Mocky – production (tracks 6)
- Aaron David Ross – production (track 5)
- Al Shux – production (track 3)
- Asma Maroof – additional production (track 10)
- Loric Sih – additional production (track 3)
- Terror Danjah – additional production (track 10)
- Nick Weiss – additional production (track 5)
- Kelsey Lu – cello (tracks 4, 11, 12)
- Alex Hayes – percussion engineering (track 10)
- Matt Mysko – assistant engineering
- Marta Salogni – additional mixing (track 7)
- Dave Kutch – mastering
- Mischa Notcutt – art direction
- Kit Mason – design
- Daniel Sannwald – photography

== Charts ==
Chart (2017)	Peak position
Belgian Albums (Ultratop Flanders)	104
Japan Albums (Oricon)	254
New Zealand Heatseeker Albums (RMNZ)	3
Scottish Albums (Official Charts)	96
Swiss Albums (Schweizer Hitparade)	80
UK Albums (Official Charts)	51
UK Independent Albums (Official Charts)	7
UK R&B Albums (Official Charts)	3
US Billboard 200	128
US Independent Albums (Billboard)	11
US Top R&B/Hip-Hop Albums (Billboard)	18
