= Y'akoto =

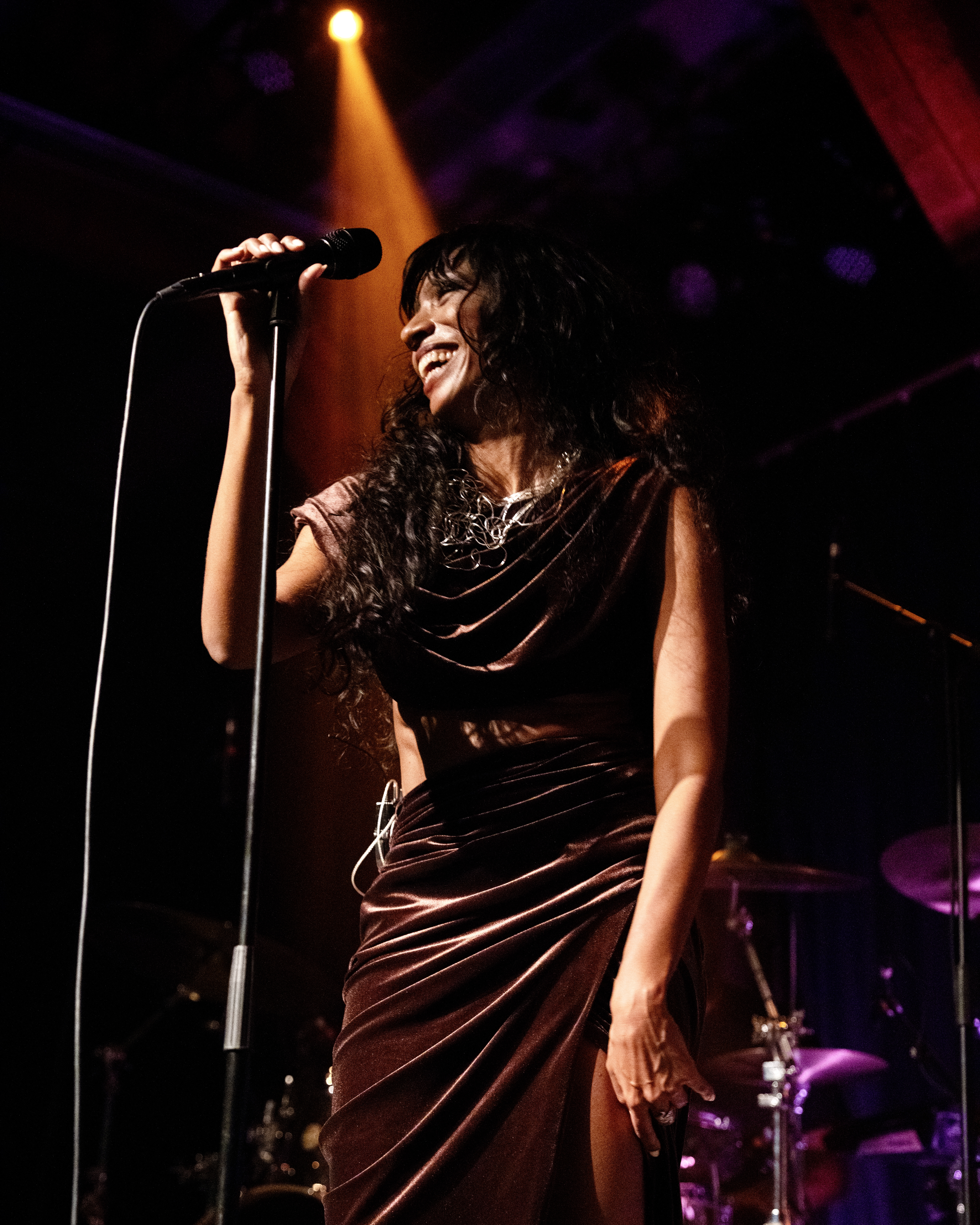
- Y'akoto performing in 2025

Background information
- Born: Jennifer Yaa Akoto Kieck; 1988 (age 37–38); Hamburg, West Germany
- Origin: Hamburg, Germany
- Genres: Neo soul, blues, Afrobeats, ambient pop
- Occupations: Singer, songwriter
- Instrument: Piano
- Years active: 2012–present
- Label: Warner Music
- Website: yakotomusic.com

Jennifer Yaa Akoto Kieck (born 1988), known professionally as Y'akoto, is a German–Ghanaian singer and songwriter whose music blends neo-soul, blues, ambient pop, and Afrobeats. Her first two albums, Babyblues (2012) and Moody Blues (2014), both entered the Top 20 on the German Albums Chart, and she has received two nominations for Germany's Echo Award.

== Early life and education ==
Y'akoto was born in Hamburg, Germany, to a Ghanaian father, a highlife musician, and a German mother. She spent much of her childhood in West Africa, living in Ghana, Cameroon, Chad, and Togo before returning to Hamburg at the age of 11. During this time, she began singing and learning to play the piano.

After completing secondary school she studied dance education and became a qualified dance teacher in 2008 before deciding to pursue a career in music.

== Career ==
Y'akoto began performing in her teens and formed her first band at 13. She signed with Warner Music and released her debut album, Babyblues, in March 2012. The album reached the Top 20 in Germany and included the single "Tamba," a song about a child soldier. In 2013, she received an Echo Award nomination for Best National Rock/Pop Female Artist.

Her second album, Moody Blues, was released in 2014 and debuted at number 11 on the German charts. The album addressed topics such as migration and single-parent families. Its release led to a second Echo Award nomination in the same category in 2015.

In 2017 she released her third album, Mermaid Blues, which blended blues, neo-soul, and pop. In 2020, Y'akoto released the EP Obaa Yaa. A year later, in 2021, she was featured in Matthew Herbert’s single "The Way". In 2022–2023, she collaborated with Los Angeles-based producer Nabeyin and Ghanaian rapper Jay Bahd on the singles "Secret" and "WMYT (What Made You Think)".

Her fourth studio album, Part 4: The Witch, was released in July 2024. The album featured collaborations with Nabeyin and U.S. hip-hop artist REASON and incorporated pop and Afrobeats styles.

In November 2025, Y'akoto published her debut book, The World Needs More Love. In January 2026, she co-founded WAVVI, a music distribution and artist services platform. Y'akoto is also a co-founder of AFROSON1C X, a music and creative industries platform that connects African artists and industry professionals. Following showcases at SXSW London and Reeperbahn Festival, AFROSON1C X held its first standalone edition in Accra, Ghana, in January 2026.

== Discography ==
Studio albums

- Babyblues (2012)
- Moody Blues (2014)
- Mermaid Blues (2017)
- Part 4: The Witch (2024)

EPs

- Obaa Yaa (2020)

== Awards and recognition ==
Y'akoto has twice been nominated for the Echo Award for Best National Rock/Pop Female Artist, first in 2013 and again in 2015.
