= Kelela =

American singer (born 1983)

Kelela ከለላ
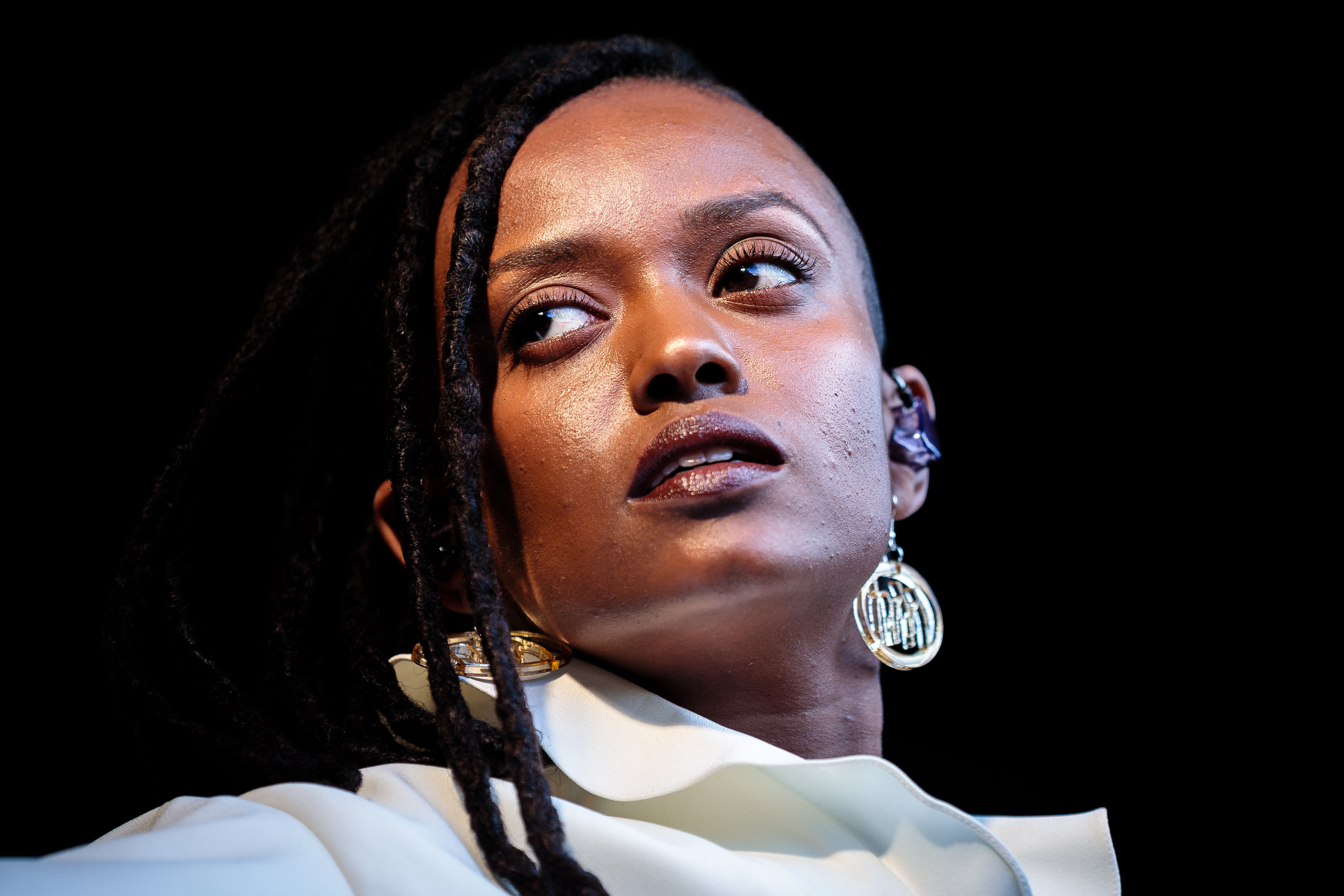
- Kelela in June 2018

Background information
- Born: Kelela Mizanekristos; June 4, 1983 (age 43); Washington, D.C., U.S.
- Genres: Alternative R&B; electronic; R&G
- Occupations: Singer; songwriter
- Years active: 2011–present
- Labels: Warp; Fade to Mind
- Website: kelela.co

Kelela Mizanekristos (Amharic: ከለላ ሚዛነክርስቶስ, romanized: käläla mizanäkərəsətosə, pronounced [kələla mizanəkrɨstos]; born June 4, 1983) is an American singer. She made her debut in the music industry with the release of her 2013 mixtape Cut 4 Me. In 2015, she released Hallucinogen, an EP which deals with the beginning, middle, and end of a relationship in reverse chronological order. Her debut studio album, Take Me Apart, was released in 2017 to critical acclaim. After a 5-year hiatus, Kelela released her second album, Raven, in February 2023.

== Early life and education ==
A second-generation Ethiopian American and an only child, Mizanekristos was born in Washington, D.C., on June 4, 1983. Growing up in Gaithersburg, Maryland, she learned to play the violin in fourth grade and sang in her school's choir. In 2001, she graduated from Magruder High School. After transferring from Montgomery College to American University, Mizanekristos began singing jazz standards at cafés. In 2008, she joined an indie band called Dizzy Spells and sang progressive metal after meeting Tosin Abasi, whom she later dated. In 2010, she moved to Los Angeles, where she currently lives, in addition to London.

== Career ==
=== 2012–2015: Cut 4 Me and Hallucinogen ===
In November 2012, Mizanekristos began work on her debut mixtape with already two recorded songs. She later quit her job as a telemarketer to fully pursue her career as a musician. Having moved to Los Angeles, Mizanekristos connected with Teengirl Fantasy and contributed to the group's 2013 album Tracer on the song "EFX", which led her to meet Prince William from the label Fade to Mind. He introduced her to the sound of the record label and its sister imprint from London, Night Slugs. In May 2013, she appeared on Kingdom's "Bank Head", and five months later released her mixtape Cut 4 Me for free. Harriet Gisbone of The Guardian described the mixtape as "an experiment for the production team, the first time the production crew had used vocals on their club tracks." Her track "Go All Night" was included on Saint Heron, a multi-artist compilation album released by Solange Knowles. The mixtape was heavily influenced by grime music, a popular electronic genre based in the UK, and helped revive the subgenre known as rhythm & grime.

In December 2013, DJ Kitty Cash released her Love the Free mixtape, which featured her song "The High". Mizanekristos later released the track herself on February 4, 2014, on her SoundCloud. She also featured on Bok Bok's song "Melba's Call", which was released on March 5. On March 3, 2015, Mizanekristos announced the release of her first EP, Hallucinogen, alongside the release of the lead single, "A Message", and its accompanying music video. The second single, "Rewind", was released on September 2. The EP covers the beginning, middle, and end of a relationship in reverse chronological order, and includes the previously shared "The High".

=== 2016–2018: Take Me Apart ===
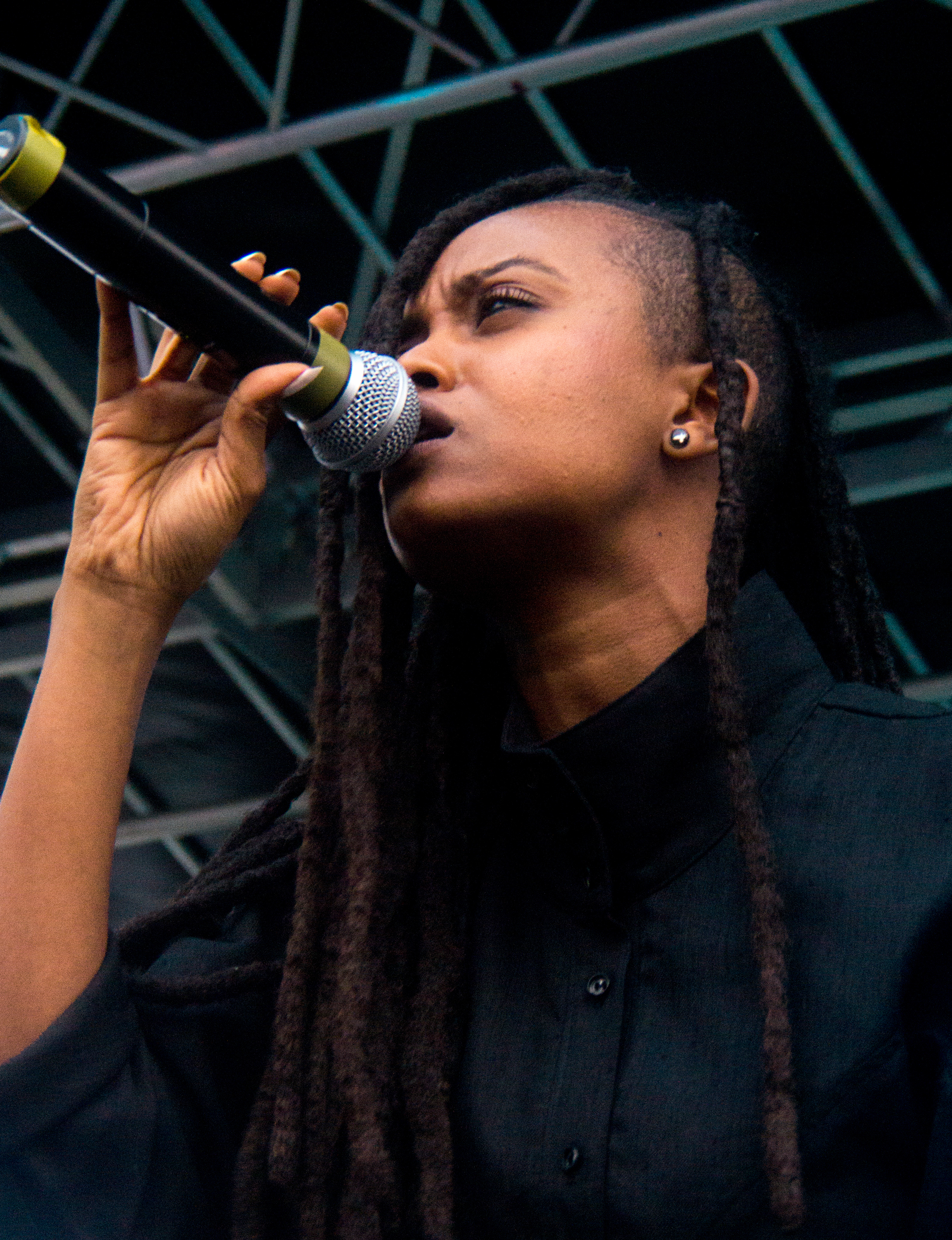
Kelela in 2014

In 2016, Mizanekristos was featured on "A Breath Away" from Clams Casino's 32 Levels, "From the Ground" from Danny Brown's Atrocity Exhibition, and "Scales" from Solange's A Seat at the Table. In February 2017, she took part in Red Bull Sound Select's 3 Days in Miami. Later that year, she was featured on the track "Submission" alongside rapper Danny Brown and provided additional vocals on the track "Busted and Blue" from Gorillaz's album Humanz.

On July 14, 2017, Mizanekristos announced her debut studio album, Take Me Apart. It was made available for pre-order on August 1 alongside the release of the lead single, "LMK". Three more singles preceded the album, "Frontline", "Waitin" and "Blue Light", before it was released on October 6, 2017. The album received widespread acclaim from music critics and featured on various year-end lists. It was also included in the 2018 edition of the book 1001 Albums You Must Hear Before You Die. The music critic Craig Jenkins noted heavy electronic instrumentation on the album with "deconstructed dubstep wubs in 'Blue Light' and used the Roland synth that gave 'Jupiter' its name—an instrument famous for its blaring leads—to play sultry chiptune instead."

On June 13, 2018, Mizanekristos was featured on the Girl Unit remix of the song "WYWD", which served as the lead single from his upcoming album, Song Feel. The two have previously worked together on Cut 4 Me's "Floor Show" and Hallucinogen's "Rewind".

On September 12, 2018, Mizanekristos announced Take Me a_Part, the Remixes, a remix album consisting of remixes from her debut album, and shared a remix for "LMK" featuring Princess Nokia, Junglepussy, Cupcakke and Ms. Boogie. The album features contributions from Kaytranada, Rare Essence, Serpentwithfeet and others. On September 26, Mizanekristos shared Kaytranada's "Waitin" remix as the second single from the album. The album was released on October 5, 2018, making it a year since the release of Take Me Apart.

=== 2022–2025: Raven ===
On September 13, 2022, Mizanekristos released "Washed Away", her first single in five years along with a music video. On November 15, 2022, Mizanekristos announced her second studio album, Raven, would be released in early 2023. "Happy Ending", "On the Run", "Contact", and "Enough for Love" were also released as singles prior to the release of the album.

On February 10, 2023, Raven was released. She performed "Enough for Love" on The Tonight Show Starring Jimmy Fallon the same day.

Raven includes collaborators such as Asmara from Fade to Mind's NGUZUNGUZU, Philadelphia-based DJ and producer LSDXOXO, German ambient duo OCA, and Toronto DJ BAMBII. The album showcases Black futurist art and electronic music sharing inspiration with Stevie Wonder, Herbie Hancock, and Sun Ra to Janelle Monáe, Solange, Beyoncé, Drexciya and Aaliyah.

On November 10, 2023, Mizanekristos was featured on PinkPantheress' debut album, Heaven Knows, on the song "Bury Me".

On December 6, 2023, Mizanekristos announced the release of her second remix album Rave:N, the Remixes, a compilation of remixes from her album Raven released earlier that year. The album was released on February 9, 2024. “Contact (Karen Nyame KG Remix)”, "Closure (Flexulant x BAMBII Remix feat. RahRah Gabor & Brazy)", "Happy Ending (A.G. Remix)", and "Holier (JD. Reid Remix) [feat. Shygirl]" were singles leading up to the release of Rave:N, the Remixes. A music video was released for "Closure (Flexulant x BAMBII Remix feat. RahRah Gabor & Brazy)" along with vignettes for the other singles.

On February 11, 2025, Mizanekristos released In The Blue Light, her live album accompanying Raven. The live album was compiled from two nights she held at the Blue Note Jazz Club in New York.

=== 2026-present: New Avatar ===
On April 8, 2026, Kelela released the song "Idea 1", her first single since the Raven era. Pitchfork described it as her "grungy" return to music. Kelela wrote and produced the song with PinkPantheress and Shygirl collaborator Oscar Scheller and painter Janiva Ellis, with instrumentation from shoegaze guitarist Scarlet House. A corresponding music video directed by 91 Rules came out the same day.

On May 5, 2026, Kelela released the song "linknb", her second single from New Avatar.

On May 31, 2026, Kelela announced via Instagram a surprise third single from New Avatar. In her post she said "wasn't goin to drop this yet but we're having too much fun! thought we'd keep the party goin. something new for you tonight-- point blank out @ midnight locally".

== Personal life ==
Kelela is queer. In 2020, she released a reading primer that contained essays, literature, podcasts, videos, and documentaries as reference material for her friends, family, and business partners. Resources included Reader on Misogynoir by Kandis Williams, The will to change by bell hooks and Algorithms of Oppression by Safiya Umoja Noble; the Seeing White podcast and IGTV videos from Sonya Renee Taylor about Black labour called Are you stealing from Black folks? and More on Stealing from Black People: Right Relationship Beyond Capitalism; and The Last Angel of History (1996), which features interviews from the late Octavia E. Butler and Greg Tate.

== Discography ==
Kelela discography
- Studio albums: 3
- EPs: 1
- Mixtapes: 1
- Live albums: 1
- Remix albums: 3
- Singles: 19

=== Studio albums ===
List of studio albums, with selected details and chart positions.
Title	Album details	Peak chart positions									
Title	Album details	US	US R&B	US Indie	AUS	BEL (FL)	NZ Heat.	SWI	UK	UK Indie	UK R&B
Take Me Apart	Released: October 6, 2017; Label: Warp; Format: CD, LP, digital download	128	18	11	—	104	3	80	51	7	3
Raven	Released: February 10, 2023; Label: Warp; Format: CD, LP, digital download	—	—	—	—	125	—	—	—	18	—
New Avatar	Released: July 10, 2026; Label: Warp; Format: CD, LP, digital download	—	—	—	61	138	—	—	—	15	2
"—" denotes a recording that did not chart or was not released in that territory.

=== Remix albums ===
List of remix albums, with selected details.
Title	Album details
Hallucinogen Remixes	Released: December 25, 2015; Label: Warp; Format: Digital download
Take Me a_Part, the Remixes	Released: October 5, 2018; Label: Warp; Format: Digital download
Rave:n, the Remixes	Released: February 9, 2024; Label: Warp; Format: LP, digital download

=== Live albums ===
List of live albums, with selected details.
Title	Album details
In the Blue Light	Released: February 11, 2025; Label: Warp; Format: LP, cassette, digital download

=== Mixtapes ===
List of mixtapes, with selected details.
Title	Album details
Cut 4 Me	Released: October 1, 2013; Label: Fade to Mind; Formats: CD, LP, digital download

=== Extended plays ===
List of extended plays, with selected details and chart positions
Title	Extended play details	Peak chart positions		
Title	Extended play details	US Dance	US Heat.	US Indie
Hallucinogen	Released: October 9, 2015; Label: Warp; Formats: LP, digital download	4	4	40

=== Singles ===
List of singles, with selected chart positions
Title	Year	Peak chart positions		Album
Title	Year	BEL (FL) Tip	JPN Hot Over.	Album
"OICU" (with P. Morris and Le1f)	2014	—	—	Non-album single
"A Message"	2015	—	—	Hallucinogen
"Rewind"	2015	33	—	Hallucinogen
"LMK"	2017	—	—	Take Me Apart
"Frontline"	2017	—	—	Take Me Apart
"Waitin"	2017	—	—	Take Me Apart
"Blue Light"	2017	—	—	Take Me Apart
"LMK (What's Really Good)" (featuring Princess Nokia, Junglepussy, Cupcakke and Ms. Boogie)	2018	—	—	Take Me a_Part, the Remixes
"Waitin" (Kaytranada remix)	2018	—	—	Take Me a_Part, the Remixes
"Washed Away"	2022	—	—	Raven
"Happy Ending"	2022	—	17	Raven
"On the Run"	2022	—	—	Raven
"Contact"	2023	—	—	Raven
"Enough for Love"	2023	—	—	Raven
"Contact" (Karen Nyame KG remix)	2023	—	—	Rave:n, the Remixes
"Closure" (Flexulant x Bambii remix) (featuring Brazy (NGA) & Rahrah Gabor)	2023	—	—	Rave:n, the Remixes
"Happy Ending" (A.G. remix)	2023	—	—	Rave:n, the Remixes
"Holier" (JD. Reid remix) (featuring Shygirl)	2024	—	—	Rave:n, the Remixes
"Better" (Unplugged)	2025	—	—	In the Blue Light
"Idea 1"	2026	—	—	New Avatar
"Linknb"	2026	—	—	New Avatar
"Point Blank"	2026	—	—	New Avatar
"Outta Time (featuring A. K. Paul)"	2026	—	—	New Avatar
"The Bridge (featuring PinkPantheress)"	2026	—	—	New Avatar
"—" denotes a recording that did not chart or was not released in that territory.

=== Guest appearances ===
List of guest appearances, with other performing artists, showing year released and album name
Title	Year	Other artist(s)	Album
"In Tatters"	2011	Daedelus	Bespoke
"EFX"	2012	Teengirl Fantasy	Tracer
"Bank Head"	2013	Kingdom	Saint Heron
"Go All Night"	2013	none	Saint Heron
"Bank Head"	2013	Kingdom	Vertical XL
"Melba's Call"	2014	Bok Bok	Your Charizmatic Self
"With You"	2014	Kindness	Otherness
"World Restart"	2014	Kindness, Ade	Otherness
"Geneva"	2014	Kindness	Otherness
"For the Young"	2014	Kindness	Otherness
"Autumn (Lude I)"	2014	Boots	Winter Spring Summer Fall
"Want It"	2014	Tink, DJ Dahi	Songs from Scratch
"Dangerzone"	2015	Future Brown, Ian Isiah	Future Brown
"Soulful Beat"	2015	Mocky	Key Change
"Weather Any Storm"	2015	Mocky	Key Change
"Living in the Snow"	2015	Mocky	Key Change
"Airy"	2015	Obey City	Merlot Sounds
"A Breath Away"	2016	Clams Casino	32 Levels
"From the Ground"	2016	Danny Brown	Atrocity Exhibition
"Scales"	2016	Solange	A Seat at the Table
"Submission"	2017	Gorillaz, Danny Brown	Humanz
"WYWD" (remix)	2018	Girl Unit	Song Feel
"Bury Me"	2023	PinkPantheress	Heaven Knows
"Within Without"	2024	Green-House	Transa
