= Hallucinogen (EP) =

2015 EP by Kelela

EP by Kelela
- Released: October 9, 2015
- Genres: Alternative R&B; electronic; rhythm & grime
- Length: 23:46
- Labels: Cherry Coffee; Warp
- Producers: Arca; Ariel Rechtshaid; Kingdom; Nugget; Girl Unit; Obey City; DJ Dahi; MA Nguzu; NA Nguzu; Gifted & Blessed; Daniel Aged

Kelela chronology
Cut 4 Me (2013)	Hallucinogen (2015)	Take Me Apart (2017)

Singles from Hallucinogen
- 1. "A Message" Released: March 3, 2015; 2. "Rewind" Released: September 2, 2015

Hallucinogen is the debut extended play (EP) by American singer and songwriter Kelela. It was released on October 9, 2015, by Warp Records and Cherry Coffee Music.

According to Stereogum, the EP covers the beginning, middle, and end of a relationship in reverse chronological order.

== Writing and recording ==
In an interview with The Fader, Kelela discussed the inspiration behind each of the songs on Hallucinogen. "A Message" and "Hallucinogen" were recorded at the same session with Arca before Cut 4 Me was finished. She wanted to wait on sharing the Arca stuff because she "wanted to go all the way with her." "A Message" reflects on a relationship that, at that time, had just ended. It's about taking responsibility for how you participated in a relationship and to use the experience to create something completely new for myself. She wrote the song with Arca and then took it to her long-time collaborator and friend Mocky. She stated that most of the time she's "thinking about who's gonna help me evoke the most feelings. Alejandra definitely does that, for sure, and Mocky and I also have that rapport. We can talk about the hardest part of the hard thing to talk about." The second track, "Gomenasai" came from a conversation Kelela had with Nguzunguzu's Asma Maroof about a documentary which discusses black women in popular music for the past 50 years and how they've been discriminated against. Kelela started working on the song over Christmas break in 2014. She wrote most of the song herself, with Sam Dew writing "a little part" as well. Producer Ariel Rechtshaid later helped to "bring it to another level." The song is "a narrative of a woman being the dominant person is the bedroom, but also dealing with someone who doesn't necessarily represent what you think of as a bottom. So, an alpha male who is being dominated by a powerful woman. Essentially, it drives the point home of a powerful man who always wants to be dominated by a powerful woman."

"Rewind" started with Kelela hearing a bassline in a song by Obey City. She asked Nugget to "repurpose the bassline and create a Miami bass skeleton around it." They wrote the song together, then she took the song to track and asked Girl Unit "to give me the most resonant Miami bass track in terms of power, and bring it into the trap outro at the end." Then she asked Kingdom "to create a palette that was subverting what was "in," more on the weird side, more representative of the universe that we're coming from. Then, I took both of their parts and blended it together and sprinkled a little bit of Ariel on top of that." The instrumental of "All The Way Down" comes from DJ Dahi who produced that song. Kelela and Jess Glynne wrote the verses together, the next part Kelela wrote with Talay Riley, and Nugget wrote part of the song as well. Dahi played Kelela a version of the instrumental that was originally intended to be on Tinashe's album, but didn't make it. Kelela loved the chorus melody so she asked Tinashe if she can use the melody for the bridge, Tinashe agreed as she had already released the album "so she had no problem with sharing the melody." Kelela stated that she's "been into the idea of collaborating with other people who are also artists, even if they're not in the room. The freedom of women sharing creative work is really exciting for me." Lyrically, the song is about abandoning unnecessary rules and focusing on things that do matter when it comes to relationships. It was based on Kelela's experience of dating someone who was younger than her.

"Hallucinogen" is an instrumental track that appeared on Arca's 2013 mixtape &&&&&. She asked Kelela to listen to a bunch of instrumentals and tell her which ones she would like to sing on. Kelela wanted to do something new, which was improvising on tracks that she's never heard before, so she asked her not to play her any of the tracks and to just to give her the microphone and the headphones. The song is the original recording for the very first take, she explains, "so that's why it's in gibberish. Arca added the delay afterwards—you can even hear her come in halfway through the track." Sonically, Kelela described it as "very much like drunk sex. It sounds very disoriented," but "also so coherent." According to Kelela, "The High" is the first song she's ever done, "It was when I first got a VoiceLive Touch, which is a piece of gear that allows you to manipulate your vocals by affecting them and looping and being able to do that simultaneously. For me, that was a really big revelation in how I could sing. It was my first time working with a piece of gear." The song is from the middle of the relationship that was ending and is about "being enthralled." She stated that the EP is a cycle, "starting on a somber note and going through all the phases of excitement and power and loss to come back around again. The last track to first track is very important to me. That shit has to be so right."

== Critical reception ==
Professional ratings
Aggregate scores
Source	Rating
Metacritic	78/100
Review scores
Source	Rating
Consequence of Sound	B−
Exclaim!	8/10
Now Magazine	4/5 stars
Pitchfork	8.3/10
Resident Advisor	4.4/5
Rolling Stone	3.5/5 stars
Spin	8/10

At Metacritic, which assigns a normalized rating out of 100 to reviews from critics, the EP received an average score of 78, based on 9 reviews, indicating "generally favorable reviews". Pitchfork awarded Hallucinogen with their "Best New Music" feature, stating: "If you consider that Kelela’s roots are in soul and R&B, the emotional side of her music makes sense. The mechanics of dance music might inspire feelings in listeners, but within the genre, overrun with the egos and opinions of "bro-teurs," her emotions are revolutionary. She is a transparent creator, unafraid of tainting the canvases of her mostly male collaborators with the imperfect, vulnerable contents of her brain and heart." Rolling Stone said the EP is "a fully-realized vision from an artist who's poised for a long and fruitful career." Consequence of Sound commented that "Hallucinogen shows Kelela’s remarkable confidence and strength through a fragility and willingness to admit faults and weaknesses." Fact said "the theme of pining which was thread throughout her debut mixtape Cut 4 Me is still present here, but more pointed and poetic this time around. Each song beams with growth." Now Magazine noted that "Kelela re-teams with many of Cut 4 Me's producers to refine her sound, while simultaneously feeling more fluid, organic and psychedelic – hence the titular nod to the intoxicating effects of love – than its predecessor." Spin thought that "Kelela obviously doesn't shy away from wearing her label's signifiers, but on Hallucinogen she transcends them, the same way she outlasted lazy classification into PBR&B in 2013, swimming to the hazy surface of a new kind of future sex/love sounds."

=== Accolades ===
Publication	Accolade	Rank	Ref.
Complex	The Best Albums of 2015	38	
Fact	The 50 Best Albums of 2015	8	
Pitchfork	The 50 Best Albums of 2015	31	
Spin	The 50 Best Albums of 2015	25	

== Track listing ==
No.	Title	Writer(s)	Producer(s)	Length
1.	"A Message"	Kelela Mizanekristos; Alejandra Ghersi; Mocky Salole; Boots	Arca	3:51
2.	"Gomenasai"	Mizanekristos; Sam Dew; Asma Maroof; Daniel Pineda; Ariel Rechtshaid	MA Nguzu; NA Nguzu^{[a]}; Rechtshaid^{[a]}	3:28
3.	"Rewind"	Mizanekristos; Jeremiah Raisen; Samuel Obey; Philip Gamble; Ezra Rubin; Rechtshaid	NUGGET; Kingdom; Girl Unit^{[a]}; Obey City^{[a]}	3:58
4.	"All the Way Down"	Mizanekristos; Raisen; Dacoury Natche; Jess Glynne; Talay Riley; Tinashe Kachingwe	DJ Dahi	4:28
5.	"Hallucinogen"	Mizanekristos; Ghersi	Arca	2:20
6.	"The High"	Mizanekristos; Gabriel Reyes-Whittaker; Daniel Aged; Rubin	Gifted & Blessed; Aged^{[a]}; Kingdom^{[a]}	5:41
Total length:				23:46

Notes

- ^{^[a]} signifies an additional producer

== Hallucinogen Remixes ==
Hallucinogen Remixes

EP by Kelela
- Released: December 25, 2015
- Length: 29:38
- Label: Warp

Professional ratings
Review scores
Source	Rating
Pitchfork	7.0/10
Resident Advisor	3.4/5

Hallucinogen Remixes is a remix EP by Kelela, released through Warp Records on December 25, 2015. The EP, which consists of reworkings of songs from the Hallucinogen EP, was announced three days prior to its release on Christmas Day as a gift to her fans, shared with Kahn's remix of "All the Way Down" featuring additional vocals from GAIKA.

The remixes range from musical styles such as footwork, grime and funk carioca, among others.

=== Track listing ===
No.	Title	Remixer(s)	Length
1.	"A Message"	DJ Spinn	3:36
2.	"Rewind"	MC Bin Laden	2:46
3.	"Rewind"	Sporting Life	4:54
4.	"All the Way Down" (featuring GAIKA)	Kahn	5:48
5.	"All the Way Down"	Air Max '97	5:18
6.	"The High"	MikeQ; Divoli S'vere	2:01
7.	"The High"	Heavee; DJ Spinn	5:15
Total length:			29:38

== Personnel ==
Credits adapted from the liner notes of Hallucinogen.

- Arca – production (tracks 1, 5), mixing (tracks 1, 5), recording (track 1) and vocals (track 5)
- Tommy King – keyboards (track 3)
- MA Nguzu – production (track 2)
- Nugget – production (track 3)
- DJ Dahi – production (track 4)
- Gifted & Blessed – production (track 6)
- Kingdom – production (track 3), additional production (track 6)
- Ariel Rechtshaid – additional production (track 2), recording (tracks 2–4)
- NA Nguzu – additional production (track 2)
- Girl Unit – additional production (track 3)
- Daniel Aged – additional production (track 6)
- Obey City – additional production (track 3)
- Nick Rowe – additional engineering (track 4)
- Chris Kasych – recording (tracks 2, 3), additional engineering (tracks 4, 6)
- Laura Sisk – recording (tracks 2, 6), additional engineering (tracks 5, 6)
- Chris Tabron – recording (track 1), mixing (tracks 2–4, 6)
- Dominic Rippel – recording (track 1)
- Patrick Wimberly – recording (track 1)
- Jeremiah Raisen – recording (track 3)
- Aaron Ahmad – recording (track 3)
- James Musshorn – recording (track 4)
- Geoff Gibbs – recording (track 6)
- Dave Kutch – mastering
- Daniel Sannwald – photography
- Golgotha – graphic design, logo design
- Tim Saccenti – inner sleeve photography

== Charts ==
Chart (2015)	Peak position
US Heatseekers Albums (Billboard)	4
US Independent Albums (Billboard)	40
US Top Dance Albums (Billboard)	4
