= Cut 4 Me =

Mixtape by Kelela
- Released: October 1, 2013
- Recorded: 2012–2013
- Genres: Alternative R&B; electronic; UK bass; R&G; techno
- Length: 49:22
- Label: Fade to Mind
- Producers: Bok Bok; Jam City; Kingdom; Morri$; Nguzunguzu; Girl Unit; NA; Napolian; Tariq & Garfield; MikeQ; Massacooramaan; Rizzla; Neana

Kelela chronology
Cut 4 Me (2013)	Hallucinogen (2015)

Alternative cover
- Deluxe edition cover

Cut 4 Me is the debut mixtape by American singer and songwriter Kelela. It was released on October 1, 2013, by Fade to Mind for free download on SoundCloud. Seeking to make the mixtape sound like a remix album, Kelela sang over instrumental tracks by producers from the Fade to Mind and Night Slugs record labels, whose sound has been described as "one of the most distinctive sounds in UK dance music, a mutable hybrid of grime, house, electro, R&B, techno, hip hop, and dubstep."

A deluxe edition featuring a new interlude and eight new remixes by the Fade to Mind and Night Slugs producers was released on April 6, 2015 on CD, vinyl, and digital download.

== Composition ==
Time Out London characterized the mixtape as "future R&B." Similarly, The Guardian described it as "twisted R&B," adding that "the songs are twisted both sonically – warping 90s R&B melodies with club beats – and emotionally, thanks to her ability to undercut mainstream pop tropes like love and seduction with such dark devotion you get the sense she's singing from a bush outside her ex-boyfriend's house." The New York Times compared Kelela to Aaliyah, while calling the mixtape "bubbly club music of the early 1990s." Exclaim! called the mixtape is "a credible cohesion of '90s house-ish sounds and soul." Time's Douglas Wolk noted that the mixtape "is built on the half-time beats and unsettling negative-space arrangements of the "bass music" collectives Night Slugs and Fade to Mind. It's forbidding stuff, but it meshes with the sweet '90s R&B inflections of Kelela's singing." The Line of Best Fit stated that the mixtape "pushed R&B to its limits by injecting it with UK bass, grime and techno." AllMusic said the mixtape is "predominantly electronic and progressive R&B."

== Critical reception ==
Professional ratings
Aggregate scores
Source	Rating
Metacritic	81/100
Review scores
Source	Rating
The 405	8/10
AllMusic	4/5 stars
Exclaim!	8/10
Fact	4.5/5
Pitchfork	8.3/10
Resident Advisor	3.5/5
Tiny Mix Tapes	3.5/5

At Metacritic, which assigns a normalized rating out of 100 to reviews from critics, the mixtape received an average score of 81, based on 6 reviews, indicating "universal acclaim". Fact stated that "there is nothing about Cut 4 Me that doesn't challenge the listener's expectations of what R&B can be in 2013 and beyond." Given their "Best New Music" label, Pitchfork said the mixtape "is an ambitiously catchy record as well as being an aesthetically ambitious one." CMJ said the mixtape is a collection "of flawlessly crafted R&B pop gems, squeezed dry of any sonic excess that tends to signal uncertainty." Calling the mixtape "excellent", The Guardian said, "across 13 tracks Kelela travels from angered to paranoid, horny to high. She will sound fine, then terrible, then merely quite unhappy until finally, for a while at least, she sounds at peace," adding that "the next 12 months are undoubtedly going to be awash with a similar structure of falsettos, surreal beats and eerie minimalism. But let's not forget: Kelela's Cut 4 Me did it first, and almost certainly did it best." Spin said "there's been no shortage of hazily hi-tech R&B over the past couple of years, but none of it sounds as eerie or as ominous as Kelela's does. The music is full of hulking, square-wave bass lines, digital chimes, desiccated claps, and jagged rhythms; synth leads waver queasily around their target pitch, and open-fifth harmonies suggest a faintly Asian air." AllMusic said "Kelela fulfills her desire to make what resembles a remix album," but added that unlike most remix albums, "there's never any sense of a disconnect between the music and the vocals. Kelela's expressive and athletic voice easily slithers between and coasts over the beats."

=== Accolades ===
Publication	Accolade	Rank	Ref.
Complex	The 50 Best Albums of 2013	28	
Fact	The 50 Best Albums of 2013	5	
Gigwise	The 50 Best Albums of 2013	20	
The Guardian	Best albums of 2013	7	
The Quietus	Quietus Albums of the Year 2013	23	
Spin	SPIN's 50 Best Albums of 2013	36	
Time	Top 10 Albums of 2013	7	
Time Out London	The 40 best albums of 2013	5	

== Track listing ==
No.	Title	Producer(s)	Length
1.	"Guns & Synths"	Bok Bok; Napolian; Tariq & Garfield	2:56
2.	"Enemy"	Nguzunguzu	4:17
3.	"Floor Show"	Girl Unit	4:38
4.	"Do It Again"	NA	3:00
5.	"Go All Night (Let Me Roll)"	Morri$	1:43
6.	"Bank Head" (Extended)	Kingdom	5:02
7.	"Cut 4 Me"	Kingdom	3:53
8.	"Keep It Cool"	Jam City	4:10
9.	"Send Me Out"	Kingdom	4:12
10.	"Go All Night (Let it Burn)"	Morri$	1:46
11.	"Something Else"	Nguzunguzu	4:07
12.	"A Lie"	Bok Bok	3:39
13.	"Cherry Coffee"	Jam City	5:59
Total length:			49:22

Cut 4 Me – Deluxe edition (bonus tracks)
No.	Title	Producer(s)	Length
14.	"Fade to Mind (Interlude)"		1:00
15.	"Keep It Cool" (Jam City Remix)	Jam City	4:07
16.	"Enemy" (Kingdom's Destruction Before Paradise Mix)	Kingdom	4:17
17.	"Send Me Out" (Girl Unit Remix)	Girl Unit	5:04
18.	"Send Me Out" (Nguzunguzu Remix)	Nguzunguzu	2:58
19.	"Keep It Cool" (Rizzla Remix)	Rizzla	4:24
20.	"Cherry Coffee" (MikeQ's Almighty Mix)	MikeQ	4:34
21.	"Go All Night" (Neana Remix)	Neana	4:23
22.	"Go All Night" (Massacooramaan Remix)	Massacooramaan	4:06
Total length:			84:15

== Release history ==
List of release dates, showing region, formats, label, editions and reference
Region	Date	Format(s)	Label	Edition(s)	Ref.
Worldwide	October 1, 2013	Digital download	Fade to Mind	Standard	
Worldwide	April 6, 2015	LP; CD; digital download	Fade to Mind	Deluxe	
