= Night Slugs =

English electronic music record label

- Founded: 2010
- Founder: Alex Sushon; James Connolly
- Distributor: Warp
- Genre: Electronic; UK bass; UK funky; deconstructed club
- Location: London, UK
- Official website: nightslugs.net

Night Slugs is an English electronic music record label, established in 2010 by Alex Sushon (also known as Bok Bok) and James Connolly (also known as L-Vis 1990). Spin magazine described the label as having "developed one of the most distinctive sounds in U.K. dance music, a mutable hybrid of grime, house, electro, R&B, techno, hip-hop, and dubstep".

== History ==
Night Slugs was originally started as a London-based club night by DJs/producers Alex Sushon and James Connolly after the two met on Myspace in 2008. The first Night Slugs party was staged at the Redstar in Camberwell in March 2008, though the nights would eventually move to the more centrally located East Village.

After artists featured at the club nights remained unsigned, Sushon and Connolly founded Night Slugs as a record label in January 2010 with the release of Mosca’s Square One EP. That same year the label released their first compilation, Night Slugs Allstars Vol. 1.

== Artists ==
Artists who have released music on Night Slugs include:

- Bok Bok
- Cubic Zirconia
- DAT Oven
- DJC
- Egyptrixx
- Girl Unit
- Helix
- Hysterics
- Jacques Greene
- Jam City
- Kingdom
- KW Griff
- Lil Silva
- L-Vis 1990
- MikeQ
- Morri$
- Mosca
- Neana
- Optimum
- Pearson Sound
- P Jam
- Sweyn Jupiter
- T. Williams
- Velour

== See also ==
- List of record labels
- List of electronic music record labels
