= Bok Bok =

English music producer, artist, and founder

- Born: Alex Sushon
- Origin: London, England
- Occupations: Musician, record producer, composer
- Label: Night Slugs

Alex Sushon, known by their stage name Bok Bok, is an English music producer, artist, and founder of the UK record label Night Slugs.

== Night Slugs ==
Sushon is the founder and label manager of London-based record label Night Slugs. Night Slugs emerged from the club night started by Sushon and James Connolly, aka L-Vis 1990, after they connected on MySpace.

Bok Bok's first EP release, entitled Southside, was described as having "a muscular grime foundation with thick bass, bright synths" by XLR8R Magazine. In March 2015 Bok Bok paired up with London Keyboardist/Composer Sweyn Jupiter for double A-Side single 'Papaya Lipgloss'. The track was released on Night Slugs on 17 March. The sensual club mix fuses synesthetic keyboards and glossy electro-funk. In September 2015, Bok Bok embarked on tour across Asia. In July 2016, Bok Bok headed out on a summer tour across America, Europe, Asia and Australia.

== Discography ==
=== Singles and EPs ===
Year	Release	Label
2017	Salvage 2017 EP	Night Slugs
2015	Bok Bok & Sweyn Jupiter - "Papaya Lipgloss"	Night Slugs
2014	Bok Bok & Tom Trago - "Pussy Trak 12"	Night Voyage
2014	Bok Bok & Tom Trago - "Need This 12"	Night Voyage
2014	"Your Charizmatic Self"	Night Slugs
2014	"Melba's Call" (featuring Kelela)	Night Slugs
2013	Bok Bok & Tom Trago – "Get Me What You Want"	Night Voyage
2012	"MJT / Dark Hearts Remix"	Night Slugs
2012	"Southside Remixes"	Night Slugs
2011	Southside EP	Night Slugs
2011	Bok Bok & Tom Trago – "Night Voyage Tool Kit"	Sound Pellegrino
2010	Cubic Zirconia / Bok Bok & Cubic Zirconia – "Hoes Come Out at Night" (Ikonika Remix) / "Reclash (Give It to Me)"	Night Slugs
2009	Dre Skull / Bok Bok & L-Vis – "I Want You" (Bok Bok V.I.P. Dub) / "Wake Up Early"	
2009	Bok Bok / L- Vis – Night Slugs EP	Dress 2 Sweat

=== Remixes ===
Year	Release	Artist	Label
2015	"Lean & Bop"	J Hus	Black Butter
2015	"Pause Repeat"	Django Django	Because Music

=== Mixes ===
Year	Release	Publication
2016	ESSENTIALS VOL 2	Night Slugs
2016	ESSENTIALS VOL 1	Night Slugs
2013	RA.391	Resident Advisor
2013	FADEMIX003	Fade to Mind
2012	NSMIX001	Night Slugs
2010	FACT Mix 211	FACT Magazine
