= Sophie discography =

Music producer

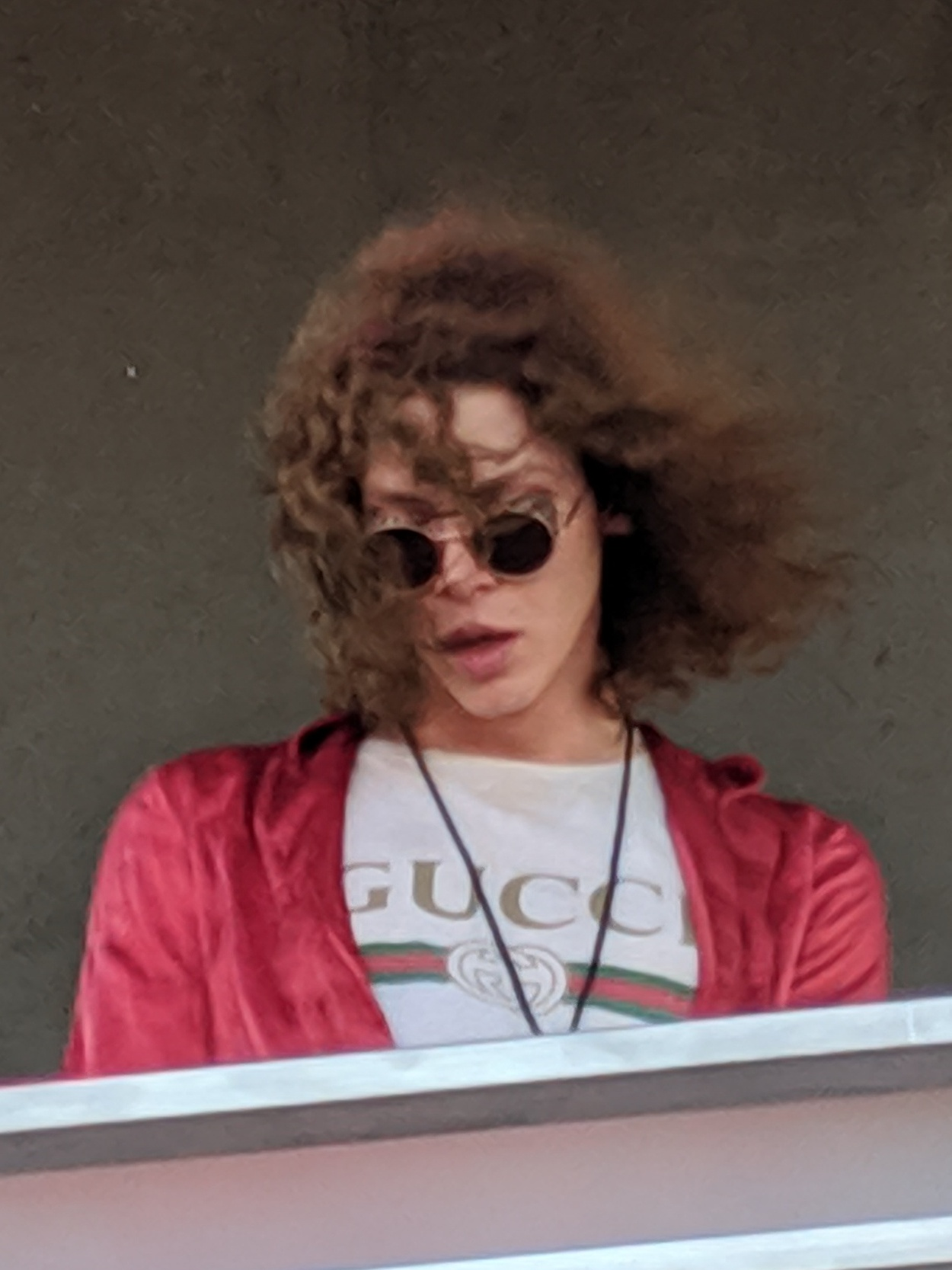
- Sophie DJing in 2019
- Studio albums: 2
- EPs: 2
- Compilation albums: 1
- Remix albums: 1
- Singles: 20
- Remixes: 12

The discography of British music producer Sophie consists of two studio albums, one compilation album, one remix album, one extended play, 20 singles, and 12 official remixes. Sophie was also known for production and writing work for other artists such as Charli XCX, Madonna, Kim Petras, Liz, MØ, and Namie Amuro, among others.

== Albums ==
=== Studio albums ===
List of studio albums, with selected information
Title	Details	Peak chart positions							
Title	Details	UK	UK Dance	UK Indie	AUS	NZ Heat.	SCO	US Heat.	US Dance
Oil of Every Pearl's Un-Insides	Released: 15 June 2018; Label: Transgressive, Future Classic, MSMSMSM; Formats: Digital download, LP	—	7	49	—	6	61	21	15
Sophie	Released: 25 September 2024; Label: Transgressive, Future Classic, MSMSMSM; Formats: Digital download, LP, CD	98	6	7	73	—	10	26	9
"—" denotes a recording that did not chart or was not released in that territory.

=== Compilation albums ===
List of compilation albums, with selected information
Title	Details	Peak chart positions	
Title	Details	SCO	US Dance
Product	Released: 27 November 2015; Label: Numbers; Formats: Digital download, LP (split into 4 separate LPs), CD	48	23

=== Remix albums ===
List of remix albums, with selected information
Title	Details
Oil of Every Pearl's Un-Insides Non-Stop Remix Album	Released: 29 July 2019; Label: Transgressive, Future Classic, MSMSMSM; Formats: CD, digital download, LP

== Extended plays ==
Title	Details
Fuck It Up (with Basside)	Released: 2 April 2021; Label: Sorry; Formats: Digital download, streaming
Released at Last (with Big Freedia)	Released: 19 June 2026; Label: We Are: The Guard; Formats: Digital download, streaming

== Singles ==
=== As lead artist ===
Title	Year	Peak chart positions		Album
Title	Year	UK Physical	UK Vinyl	Album
"Nothing More to Say"	2013	—	—	Non-album single
"Bipp"	2013	12 (Note: Applies to the "Bipp / Elle" vinyl.)	7	Product
"Elle"	2013	12	7	Product
"Lemonade"	2014	5 (Note: Applies to the "Lemonade / Hard" vinyl.)	3	Product
"Hard"	2014	5	3	Product
"MSMSMSM"	2015	11 (Note: Applies to the "MSMSMSM / Vyzee" vinyl.)	6	Product
"Just Like We Never Said Goodbye"	2015	13 (Note: Applies to the "L.O.V.E. / Just Like We Never Said Goodbye" vinyl.)	8	Product
"L.O.V.E."	2015	13	8	Product
"Vyzee"	2015	11	6	Product
"It's Okay to Cry"	2017	—	—	Oil of Every Pearl's Un-Insides
"Ponyboy"	2017	—	—	Oil of Every Pearl's Un-Insides
"Faceshopping"	2018	—	—	Oil of Every Pearl's Un-Insides
"Metal" (with Jimmy Edgar)	2020	—	—	Cheetah Bend
"Bipp" (Autechre Mx)	2021	—	—	Non-album single
"Unisil"	2021	—	—	Product
"Fuck It Up" (with Basside)	2021	—	—	Fuck It Up
"Reason Why" (featuring Kim Petras and BC Kingdom)	2024	—	—	Sophie
"Berlin Nightmare" (featuring Evita Manji)	2024	—	—	Sophie
"One More Time" (featuring Popstar)	2024	—	—	Sophie
"Exhilarate" (featuring Bibi Bourelly)	2024	—	—	Sophie
"My Forever" (featuring Cecile Believe)	2024	—	—	Sophie
"Ooh"	2025	—	—	Product
"Get Higher"	2025	—	—	Product
"Sunscreen" (with Liz)	2025	—	—	Prototype
"Blaze That Ass" (with Big Freedia)	2026	—	—	Released at Last
"Go Down" (with Big Freedia)	2026	—	—	Released at Last
"Let Me See Ya” (with Big Freedia & Muna)	2026	–	–	Released at Last
"—" denotes a recording that did not chart or was not released in that territory.

=== As a featured artist ===
Title	Year	Peak chart positions	Album
Title	Year	US Dance Elec.	Album
"9 (After Coachella)" (Cashmere Cat featuring MØ and Sophie)	2017	47	9
"1, 2, 3 Dayz Up" (Kim Petras featuring Sophie)	2019	40	The Summer I Couldn't Do Better

=== Other appearances ===
Title	Year	Peak chart positions	Album
Title	Year	NZ Hot	Album
"Sfire 2" (Sfire)	2013	—	Sfire
"Sfire 3" (Sfire)	2013	—	Sfire
"Sfire 6" (Sfire)	2015	—	Sfire 6/7
"Sfire 7" (Sfire)	2015	—	Sfire 6/7
"Drop Down" (Lunice featuring Sophie and Le1f)	2017	—	CCCLX
"Voices" (Flume featuring Sophie and Kučka)	2019	27	Hi This Is Flume
"Is It Cold in the Water?" (Flume and Eprom Remix)	2019	—	Hi This Is Flume
"Sfire 1" (Sfire featuring Marcela)	2019	—	Sfire 001
"Plunging Asymptote" (with Juliana Huxtable as Analemma)	2019	—	Locus Error
"Liminal Crisis" (with Juliana Huxtable as Analemma)	2019	—	Locus Error
"La Chiqui" (Arca featuring Sophie)	2020	—	Kick I
"JSLOIPNHIE" (with Jlin)	2021	—	Intermission
"Demo" (with Quay Dash)	2021	—	Non-album song
"—" denotes a recording that did not chart or was not released in that territory.

== Remixes ==
Year	Title	Artist
2010	"Formal Lady" (Sophie & Alcuin Stevenson Allure Party Mix)	Alcuin Stevenson
2011	"Mayfair" (Mr. Stevenson & Sophie Version)	Alcuin Stevenson
2012	"Highlife" (Sophie Remix)	Auntie Flo
2013	"Who Am I" (Sophie Msmsmsm Remix)	Tiny Dancer
2014	"Won't K" (Sophie Remix)	Paris Suit Yourself
2015	"Moteur Action" (Sophie and A. G. Cook Remix)	Yelle
2019	"Sweat" (Sophie Remix)	Sonikku featuring Liz
2020	"Cum" (Sophie Remix)	Brooke Candy
2020	"Forever" (Sophie Remix)	Fletcher
2020	"Animosity" (Sophie Remix)	Abyss X
2020	"Clown Shit (Up the Wall)" (Sophie Remix)	Babynymph & Bayli
2021	"NYC2MIA" (Sophie Remix)	Basside

== Songwriting and production credits ==
Title	Year	Artist(s)	Album	Credits	Written with	Produced with
"Catch"	2013	Palmistry	Non-album single	Additional producer	Benjy Keating	Palmistry
"Hey QT"	2014	QT	Non-album single	Co-writer/co-producer	Alexander Guy Cook	A. G. Cook
"Bitch, I'm Madonna" (featuring Nicki Minaj)	2014	Madonna	Rebel Heart	Co-writer/co-producer	Madonna Ciccone; Thomas Pentz; Ariel Rechtshaid; Maureen McDonald; Toby Gad; Onika Maraj	Madonna; Diplo
"B Who I Want to B" (featuring Hatsune Miku)	2015	Namie Amuro	Genic	Co-writer/producer	Mitchie M	—N/a
"When I Rule the World"	2015	Liz	Non-album single	Co-writer/producer	Marcus Andersson; Cecilia Efraimsson	—N/a
"Koi"	2015	Le1f	Riot Boi	Producer	Khalif Diouf	—N/a
"Vroom Vroom"	2015	Charli XCX	Vroom Vroom	Co-writer/producer	Charlotte Aitchison; Amanda Lucille Warner; Jonnali Parmenius	—N/a
"Paradise" (featuring Hannah Diamond)	2016	Charli XCX	Vroom Vroom	Co-writer/producer	Alexander Guy Cook; Charlotte Aitchison; Martin Stilling; Jonnali Parmenius	—N/a
"Trophy"	2016	Charli XCX	Vroom Vroom	Co-writer/producer	Charlotte Aitchison; Amanda Lucille Warner; Jonnali Parmenius; Patrik Berger	—N/a
"Secret (Shh)"	2016	Charli XCX	Vroom Vroom	Co-writer/co-producer	Jesse "St. John" Geller; Jessica Karpov; Jodie Harsh	Jodie Harsh
"High School Love"	2016	Liz	Cross Your Heart	Co-writer	Elizabeth Abrams	—N/a
"After the Afterparty" (featuring Lil Yachty)	2016	Charli XCX	Non-album single	Co-writer/additional producer	Charlotte Aitchison; Eyelar Mirzazadeh; Fred Gibson; Mikkel Eriksen; Miles McCollum; Rachel Keen; Tor Hermansen	StarGate; Fred; A. G. Cook
"Love Incredible" (featuring Camila Cabello)	2017	Cashmere Cat	9	Co-writer/co-producer	Magnus August Høiberg; Benjamin Levin; Theron Thomas; Timothy Thomas; Camila Cabello	Cashmere Cat; Benny Blanco
"Roll with Me"	2017	Charli XCX	Number 1 Angel	Co-writer/producer	Charlotte Aitchison; Klas Ahlund; Jonnali Parmenius	—N/a
"Lipgloss" (featuring cupcakKe)	2017	Charli XCX	Number 1 Angel	Producer	—N/a	Life Sim; A. G. Cook
"Nights with You"	2017	MØ	Non-album single	Co-writer/producer	Karen Marie Ørsted; Magnus August Høiberg; Benjamin Levin; Ryan Tedder	Cashmere Cat; Benny Blanco
"Bossed Up"	2017	Quay Dash	Transphobic	Producer	—N/a	—N/a
"Yeah Right" (featuring Kendrick Lamar and Kučka)	2017	Vince Staples	Big Fish Theory	Co-writer/producer	Vincent Staples; Harley Streten; Kendrick Duckworth; Laura Jane Lowther	Flume
"Samo" (featuring ASAP Rocky)	2017	Vince Staples	Big Fish Theory	Co-writer/producer	Vincent Staples; Rakim Mayers	—N/a
"Ripe"	2017	Banoffee	Non-album single	Co-producer	Martha Brown	Banoffee
"Fantasy" (featuring Amber Liu)	2017	Superfruit	Future Friends	Co-writer/co-producer	Sarah Hudson; Danny L Harle; John Hill; Amber Liu	Danny L Harle
"Queen of This Shit"	2017	Quay Dash	Non-album single	Producer	—N/a	—N/a
"Out of My Head" (featuring Alma and Tove Lo)	2017	Charli XCX	Pop 2	Co-writer/co-producer	Charlotte Aitchison; Ebba Tove Nilsson; Alma-Sofia Miettinen; Alexander Guy Cook	A. G. Cook
"Hot Pink"	2018	Let's Eat Grandma	I'm All Ears	Co-writer/co-producer	Rosa Walton; Jenny Hollingworth	Faris Badwan
"It's Not Just Me"	2018	Let's Eat Grandma	I'm All Ears	Co-writer/co-producer	Rosa Walton; Jenny Hollingworth	Faris Badwan
"No Angel"	2018	Charli XCX	Non-album single	Additional producer	—N/a	The Invisible Men; SaltWives
"Immigrant Sons (Pesos & Gas)"	2018	Gaika	Basic Volume	Co-producer	—N/a	Gaika; Aart
"Warlord Shoes"	2018	Gaika	Basic Volume	Co-writer/co-producer	Gaika	Gaika
"Girls Night Out"	2018	Charli XCX	Non-album single	Co-writer/co-producer	Charlotte Aitchison	Stargate
"Water"	2019	Palmistry	Afterlife	Co-writer/producer	Benjy Keating	—N/a
"Back for You"	2019	Cashmere Cat	Princess Catgirl	Co-writer/co-producer	Magnus August Høiberg; Daystar Peterson	Cashmere Cat; Benny Blanco
"Reverse N Stop"^{a}	2019	BC Kingdom	TBA	Co-writer/Producer	Zou Deon; Logan Eze; Jonny on the Rocks	—N/a
"Tuesday"	2019	Jodie Harsh	Non-album single	Co-writer	Jodie Harsh; Caila Thompson-Hannant	—N/a
"Count on You"	2020	Banoffee	Look at Us Now Dad	Co-producer	—N/a	Banoffee; Yves Rothman
"Ripe" (featuring cupcakKe)^{b}	2020	Banoffee	Look at Us Now Dad	Co-producer	—N/a	Banoffee
"Shake Sum" (featuring cupcakKe)	2020	Kidd Kenn	Child's Play	Co-writer/co-producer	Dontrell Smith; James Edgar; Elizabeth Harris	Jimmy Edgar
"24HRS"	2020	Itzy	It'z Me	Co-writer/producer	Lola Blanc	—N/a
"SLIME"	2020	Shygirl	ALIAS	Co-writer/co-producer	Blane Muise; Kai Whiston; Salvador Navarrete	Kai Whiston; Sega Bodega
"Me & My Boo (Best Friend 2)"	2021	Basside	Fuck It Up	Producer	—N/a	—N/a
"Fuck It Up"	2021	Basside	Fuck It Up	Producer	—N/a	—N/a
"Swipe"	2021	Basside	Fuck It Up	Producer	—N/a	—N/a
"Girl"	2021	Basside	Fuck It Up	Producer	—N/a	—N/a
"Crazy Expensive"	2021	Basside	Fuck It Up	Producer	—N/a	—N/a
"So Clear"	2022	Hyd	Clearing	Co-writer/co-producer	Hyd; EASYFUN	Easyfun; A. G. Cook
"Fallen Angel"	2022	Hyd	Clearing	Co-writer/co-producer	Hyd; Danny L Harle; A. G. Cook	A. G. Cook
"Trust"	2022	Hyd	Clearing	Co-writer/co-producer	Hyd; Caroline Polachek; A. G. Cook	A. G. Cook
"The Real You"	2022	Hyd	Clearing	Co-writer/co-producer	Hyd; A. G. Cook; John Roberts	A. G. Cook
"Only Living for You"	2022	Hyd	Clearing	Co-writer/co-producer	Hyd; A. G. Cook	A. G. Cook
"Lost Everything"	2023	Thy Slaughter	Soft Rock	Co-writer	A. G. Cook; Easyfun; Ellie Rowsell	A. G. Cook; Easyfun
"Makeover"	2026	Hyd	Hold Onto Me Infinity	Co-writer/co-producer	Hyd; Benjamin Long	Benny Long
"Make Me Believe"	2026	Hyd	Hold Onto Me Infinity	Co-writer/co-producer	Hyd; Ross Matthew Birchard; Benjamin Long	Hudson Mohawke
Basketball	2026	Kim Petras	Detour	Co-writer/producer	Kim Petras; Margo Wildman; Chris Cummings; Eric Scroggings; Johnathan Jean-Luc Pashayan; Jonathan Simone	BC Kingdom; Italian Leather; Jonny On The Rocks; Margo XS

- ^a"Reverse N Stop" was released in Simlish as an option for the pop radio station in The Sims 4 Island Living. BC Kingdom has confirmed on Twitter and Instagram that the track will be released in English in the future.
- ^bThis is a remix featuring Chicago rapper Cupcakke of the 2017 single, which was also co-produced by Sophie. The production is only slightly different.

== Music videos ==
Title	Year	Director(s)	Album
"It's Okay to Cry"	2017	Sophie and Nicholas Harwood	Oil of Every Pearl's Un-Insides
"Ponyboy"	2017	Sophie and Nicholas Harwood	Oil of Every Pearl's Un-Insides
"Faceshopping"	2018	Sophie and Aaron Chan	Oil of Every Pearl's Un-Insides

Other appearances

Title	Artist	Year	Role	Director(s)	Album
"After the Afterparty"	Charli XCX	2016	Zombie	Diane Martel	Non-album single
"This Life"	Vampire Weekend	2019	Self	Emmett Malloy	Father of the Bride
"Last Thing He Said To Me In person"	Cecile Believe	2020	Self	Zoe Chait	Made In Heaven
"SLIME"	Shygirl	2020	Self	Shygirl and Mischa Notcutt	Alias (EP)

== Mixes ==
Year	Title
2014	"Just Jam 117"
2014	"Rinse FM Podcast: DisMagazine"
2020	"7G Afterparty Mix"
2020	"Sophie Livetream Heav3n Suspended"
