= Is It Cold in the Water? =

Song by Sophie

from the album Oil of Every Pearl's Un-Insides
- Released: 15 June 2018
- Length: 3:32
- Label: MSMSMSM; Future Classic; Transgressive
- Songwriters: Sophie Xeon; Caila Thompson-Hannant
- Producer: Sophie Xeon

"Is It Cold in the Water?" is a song by the British music producer Sophie. It is the fourth track from her debut studio album, Oil of Every Pearl's Un-Insides, released on 15 June 2018.

== Composition ==
Wren Sanders of Them described "Is It Cold in the Water?" as "arguably the climactic moment" from Oil of Every Pearl's Un-Insides, "[taking] the listener to the very edge of the diving board of the self". Ryan White of i-D described it as "an unsettling and urgent three and a half minutes that sounds something like an unanswered scream into the abyss in the middle of the night". Sanders said that the "soaring" vocals of Cecile Believe appear above the "clanging, arpeggiated synths". Believe's voice crescendoes until she sings "Is it cold in the water?". Sanders noted that Believe holds the "o" in "cold" for 12 seconds, adding: "the held 'o' in Believe's vocal is not stagnant; it flutters at the prospect of flight".

Tom Breihan of Stereogum said that it is "an anguished howl, surrounding her voice with her trademark frantically ping-ponging electronic sounds".

== Reception ==
Pitchfork named it the "Best New Track" at the time of its release. Laviea Thomas of Notion said that "the harmonies and ethereal production on this track make 'Is It Cold in The Water?' a true masterpiece. Junkee named it one of her essential tracks.

It was named one of the best songs of the year by Pitchfork, Spin, and Uproxx's critics poll. It was remixed by Flume and Eprom for the 2019 mixtape Hi This Is Flume. It was covered by Moses Sumney and Anohni for the 2024 compilation Transa.

== Personnel ==
- Sophie Xeon – composer, producer, mixing engineer
- Caila Thompson-Hannant – composer
- Benny Long – mixing engineer
