= Ponyboy =

Ponyboy can refer to:

- Pony boy, term for a child labourer leading a pit pony
- Ponyboy Curtis, a character in the novel The Outsiders by S. E. Hinton, Hard Cover
- My Pony Boy, a song from 1909
- "Ponyboy", a 2017 song by Sophie from Oil of Every Pearl's Un-Insides
- "Pony Boy", a song by the Allman Brothers Band from Brothers and Sisters (album)
- Ponyplay, a human sexual roleplay, see Human animal roleplay
