= Oil of Every Pearl's Un-Insides Non-Stop Remix Album =

Remix album by Sophie
- Released: 29 July 2019
- Genre: Dance; techno; ambient; house
- Length: 94:48
- Label: MSMSMSM; Future Classic; Transgressive
- Producer: Sophie

Sophie chronology
Oil of Every Pearl's Un-Insides (2018)	Oil of Every Pearl's Un-Insides Non-Stop Remix Album (2019)	Sophie (2024)

Oil of Every Pearl's Un-Insides Non-Stop Remix Album (stylised in all caps) is the only remix album by the British music producer Sophie, released on 29 July 2019 through MSMSMSM, Future Classic, and Transgressive. A double-album, it features new songs and remixes from her debut studio album, Oil of Every Pearl's Un-Insides (2018). The album was first announced as a limited edition release with clutch bags. Oil of Every Pearl's Un-Insides Non-Stop Remix Album was positively received, with a Clash writer saying that it set a high bar for remix albums. It received a nomination at the AIM Independent Music Awards.

== Background and release ==
In a Grammy Awards red carpet interview on 10 February 2019, Sophie revealed that a remix album for Oil of Every Pearl's Un-Insides was in development. Oil of Every Pearl's Un-Insides Non-Stop Remix Album was officially announced on 17 July 2019, and was available on compact disc exclusively with the purchase of one of 100 limited-edition clutch bags designed in collaboration with Mawi and Ciaran Moore. Available in red or black, the bags feature an image of Sophie from the album's artwork. The clutch bag had first been shown at the Grammy Awards red carpet interview. Matt Moen of Paper said that this was "the most Sophie-like way" the album could have been announced, noting that Sophie's 2015 compilation Product came with a "silicon product".

Oil of Every Pearl's Un-Insides Non-Stop Remix Album was released on YouTube on 29 July 2019. In the video's description, Sophie wrote: "This is an album for myself, my friends, and all of the sweet people that have supported me and inspired me, I love you. Let's celebrate." It was released on streaming platforms on 6 September 2019. On 25 November 2024, it was released on vinyl.

== Content ==
A double-album, Oil of Every Pearl's Un-Insides Non-Stop Remix Album features new tracks by Sophie, some of which had been played at her tours and had become fan favourites. It also features remixes of the Oil of Every Pearl's Un-Insides songs "Ponyboy", "Faceshopping", "Infatuation", "Not Okay", "Pretending", and "Whole New World / Pretend World"; Dazed writer Neil Walsh highlighted the absence of a remix for "Immaterial". The remixes were done by Sophie herself, though the American producer Doss collaborated with her on a remix of "Whole New World". Andrew Ryce of Resident Advisor said that the album "runs together like a mix CD".

Moen described the album as featuring "everything from throbbing techno to glitter-dusted house renditions and glossy ambient drones". Clash's Skye Butchard said that "[t]here are free-form ambient pieces, terrifying club bangers and everything in between". Ryce wrote that the album's first half contains "twisted dance jams", while the second half is ambient-oriented. He said that the album delivers a release of emotions with "rambunctious beats, sweet melodies, and the gnarliest sounds" Sophie could create. The Quietus's Christian Eede highlighted Sophie's "distinctive, metallic sound design".

== Reception ==
Oil of Every Pearl's Un-Insides Non-Stop Remix Album was positively received. Resident Advisor gave the album their "RA Recommends" badge, with their reviewer Andrew Ryce saying that Sophie's themes of exploration, self-acceptance, and identity are taken "directly onto the dance floor, in ways that are as splashy, strange and unforgettable as you'd hope". He wrote: "It's an exhilarating listen that reaffirms her status as a key electronic music artist". Mr. P of Tiny Mix Tapes described each disc as "consisting of over 47 minutes of seamless fun". Shaad D'Souza of The Fader said that the album is "its own record, a raucous, mixed-through epic that contains enough new material — and enough radical reshaping of old material — that it often feels like a sophomore record, or at least something entirely different to [the original]". He added that the album "feels shocking and revelatory in how it reframes and reforms existing music into entirely new shapes". The Quietus named it the 17th best miscellaneous album of the year.

In 2020, Oil of Every Pearl's Un-Insides Non-Stop Remix Album was nominated for Best Creative Packaging at the AIM Independent Music Awards. In 2021, Butchard described the album as "genius" and a showcase of Sophie's production talent, a contemplation of self, and a critique of the remix album format. According to Butchard, "the benchmark set by Non-Stop for remix albums is a concrete reflection of [Sophie's] impact."

== Track listing ==
All tracks produced by Sophie, with "Laser" co-produced by Benny Long, and written by Sophie with co-writers noted.

Disc 1
No.	Title	Co-writer(s)	Length
1.	"Cold World"	Cecile Believe	4:25
2.	"Not Okay" (Alone Remix)	Cecile Believe	1:24
3.	"XTC Acid"		3:12
4.	"Ponyboy (Megadog)"	Cecile Believe	4:57
5.	"Push Emission (Whore Moans)"	Cecile Believe	5:27
6.	"Ponyboy" (Faast Boy Remix)	Cecile Believe	5:44
7.	"Faceshopping" (Lipstick Gel Remix)	Cecile Believe	2:45
8.	"Not Okay (Machine World)"		1:45
9.	"Whole New World" (Sophie and Doss Remix)	Doss	3:30
10.	"Infatuation" (Lichtbogen Dreamin' Remix)	Cecile Believe	5:08
11.	"Faceshopping" (Euphoric Reduce Me To Nothingness Remix)	Cecile Believe	5:11
12.	"Pretending I Give In (Let Go)"	Cecile Believe	4:07

Disc 2
No.	Title	Co-writer(s)	Length
1.	"Leeds Heaven and Hell (Note: "Leeds Heaven and Hell" was renamed to "Pretending (Glasshouse)" on streaming services.)"		6:07
2.	"Whole New World" (Big Kiss Remix)	Cecile Believe	3:09
3.	"Pony Whip" (featuring BC Kingdom)	Cecile Believe; Eric Scoggins; Chris Cummings	4:11
4.	"Faceshopping" (Money Mix) (featuring Bibi Bourelly)	Bourelly	3:54
5.	"Pretend World (Shop Front)"	Cecile Believe	3:08
6.	"Laser"		3:41
7.	"Cold Water"		3:41
8.	"Dive (SDF)"	Cecile Believe	1:49
9.	"Infatuation (Sunlight Zone)"	Cecile Believe	1:08
10.	"Infatuation (Twilight Zone)"	Cecile Believe	1:29
11.	"Infatuation (Midnight Zone)"	Cecile Believe	5:55
12.	"Infatuation (The Abyss)"	Cecile Believe	0:59
13.	"Infatuation (The Trenches)"	Cecile Believe	8:01
Total length:			94:48

== Personnel ==
- Sophie – producer, mixing
- Benny Long – co-producer (track 18), mixing

== Release history ==
Release formats for Oil of Every Pearl's Un-Insides Non Stop Remix Album
Region	Date	Format	Label	Ref.
Various	July 2019	Compact disc	Transgressive; Future Classic; MSMSMSM	
Various	29 July 2019	YouTube	Transgressive; Future Classic; MSMSMSM	
Various	6 September 2019	Digital download; streaming	Transgressive; Future Classic; MSMSMSM	
Various	25 November 2024	LP	Transgressive; Future Classic; MSMSMSM	
