= Immaterial (song) =

Song by Sophie

from the album Oil of Every Pearl's Un-Insides
- Released: 15 June 2018
- Genre: Hyperpop; dance-pop
- Length: 3:53
- Label: MSMSMSM; Future Classic; Transgressive
- Songwriters: Sophie Xeon; Caila Thompson-Hannant
- Producer: Sophie Xeon

"Immaterial" is a song by the British music producer Sophie. It is the eighth track from her debut studio album Oil of Every Pearl's Un-Insides, released 15 June 2018. It was named one of the best songs of the year by multiple publications.

== Background and composition ==
"Immaterial"
"Immaterial" is a hyperpop and dance-pop song.

"Immaterial" features lead vocals from Cecile Believe, who co-wrote it with Sophie. Sophie felt that it was the most mainstream of all Oil of Every Pearl's Un-Insides tracks. The track was described as hyperpop and dance-pop. Sources described "Immaterial" as a reference to the Madonna song "Material Girl"; Sophie had initially titled it "Immaterial Girl" for a direct reference.

== Reception ==
"Immaterial" was named one of the best songs of 2018 by The Fader, Noisey (Vice), PopMatters, Tiny Mix Tapes, Dazed, Mixmag, NME, Resident Advisor, The 405, and Jenesaispop. It was featured as one of Sophie's best or most essential songs in lists published by Billboard, The Fader, Junkee, The New York Times, and NME. Rolling Stone ranked it the 40th greatest dance song of all time. The Forty-Five's Sophie Walker named it the best hyperpop song of all time.

== Personnel ==
- Sophie Xeon – composer, producer, mixing engineer
- Caila Thompson-Hannant – composer
- Benny Long – mixing engineer
