= Sophie (album) =

2024 posthumous studio album by Sophie

Studio album by Sophie
- Released: September 25, 2024
- Genre: Pop; ambient; techno
- Length: 67:02
- Label: MSMSMSM; Transgressive
- Producer: Sophie; Benny Long

Sophie chronology
Oil of Every Pearl's Un-Insides Non-Stop Remix Album (2019)	Sophie (2024)

Singles from Sophie
- 1. "Reason Why" Released: 24 June 2024; 2. "Berlin Nightmare" Released: 23 July 2024; 3. "One More Time" Released: 24 July 2024; 4. "Exhilarate" Released: 28 August 2024; 5. "My Forever" Released: 24 September 2024

Sophie (stylised in all caps) is the second and final studio album by British music producer Sophie. It was posthumously released on 25 September 2024 and billed as her final album release. Her brother, Benny Long, took the lead in finalizing its production after her death. All of the tracks, excluding the first, have a featured artist.

Five singles preceded it, starting with "Reason Why", and followed by "Berlin Nightmare", "One More Time", "Exhilarate" and "My Forever", spread out one month apart.

== Background ==
After Sophie's unexpected death in 2021, plans of releasing her unpublished works were discussed. In June 2021, her brother Benny Long considered the possibility of a posthumous release of her planned follow-up to her debut album, Oil of Every Pearl's Un-Insides, stating it "just needed finishing touches".

According to Long, the album was nearly complete at the time of Sophie's death. The track list was "roughly sketched out" by her. As a longtime studio engineer of Sophie, Long completed the album. Their two sisters were also involved in the process. For most of the songs, features such as arrangements and production had already been prepared. Some songs needed minimal mixing and mastering, while others were somewhere between sketches and demos. Extensive discussions with Sophie guided him in determining the direction each track should take.

On 21 June 2024, Sophie's YouTube channel and a new social media account titled "@msmsmsm_forever" uploaded a series of videos and posts teasing an announcement on 24 June 2024. When the teased date arrived, the lead single from the album, "Reason Why", featuring Kim Petras and BC Kingdom, was released alongside an announcement of the posthumous self-titled album to be released in September that year.

On Instagram, Sophie's family posted a statement regarding the album:

When we, Sophie's family, took our first steps towards bringing this project to fruition we contacted the dear friends with whom she envisioned the album. We wrote, "We have been finding comfort in the music Sophie left us, it is a gift that we truly cherish as we try to find a way forward, with Sophie forever at the center of our worlds." Sophie didn't often speak publicly of her private life, preferring to put everything she wanted to articulate in her music. It feels only right to share with the world the music she hoped to release, in the belief that we can all connect with her in this, the form she loved most. Sophie gave all of herself to her music. It's here that she can always be found.

— Sophie's family

The album released on streaming services two days early on 25 September, following the premiere of a six-minute video showcasing interviews from the album's collaborators.

== Reception ==
Professional ratings
Aggregate scores
Source	Rating
AnyDecentMusic?	6.5/10
Metacritic	70/100
Review scores
Source	Rating
AllMusic	4/5 stars
DIY	3.5/5 stars
Exclaim!	7/10
Financial Times	2/5 stars
The Guardian	4/5 stars
The Line of Best Fit	8/10
MusicOMH	4/5 stars
NME	3/5 stars
Pitchfork	6.8/10
Rolling Stone	4/5 stars

According to the review aggregator Metacritic, Sophie received "generally favorable reviews" based on a weighted average score of 70 out of 100 from 17 critic scores.

Rolling Stone wrote that the album was "full of wildly inventive bangers" and "set[s] a new bar for other musicians to leap over if they dare." The Guardian characterized the album as "dense and unpredictable, never settling into the easy rhythms of a post-death tribute", highlighting that while posthumous albums are often cash grabs by opportunistic labels or management teams, Sophie's release stands out as a more "complete statement". MusicOMH thought the album was "a fitting addition to her legacy". For DIY, it was "more commemorative than conclusive - a welcome celebration; an answerphone message revisited." Drew Gillis of The A.V. Club described it as "a touching tribute, even though it can't capture all that she was". Similarly, Jesse Dorris from Pitchfork called it a "bittersweet, difficult to pin down, and an unusually safe statement from one of the 21st century's great risk-takers", while Josh Korngut of Exclaim! found it successful but "not quite a SOPHIE project."

NME's Alex Rigotti was less positive, opining that "there’s a gnawing impersonality that plagues many of the tracks here" and concluding that "the album doesn’t fully execute SOPHIE’s unique vision." The Quietus's Karl Smith stated that "SOPHIE's absence is most keenly felt in the many gaps on this posthumous guest contributor album", with many hallmarks of her music "dialed down throughout or, in some cases, gone altogether". Slant Magazine's Charles Lyons-Burt felt that "without her patented mix of prankish wit and bleeding-heart expressivity to guide the project, [the album] feels more like a ChatGPT recreation of a true visionary's unique brand of pop". Writing for Resident Advisor, Sasha Geffen opined that the "underdeveloped second album reveals just how much of her music's impact came from its finishing details", feeling that the release lacked "the propulsive, dynamic sound of the music SOPHIE shared just months before her death", including her 2020 HEAV3N livestream.

=== Year-end lists ===
Select year-end rankings for Sophie
Publication/critic	Accolade	Rank	Ref.
Bleep	Top 10 Albums of 2024	10	
DJ Mag	Best Albums of 2024	unranked	
The Line of Best Fit	Best Albums of the Year 2024	31	
The Observer: Kitty Empire	10 Best Albums of 2024	8	
Rough Trade UK	Albums of the Year 2024	1	

== Track listing ==
Credits taken from the vinyl. All tracks produced by Sophie & Benny Long.

Sophie track listing
No.	Title	Writer(s)	Length
1.	"Intro (The Full Horror)"	Sophie Xeon	4:32
2.	"Rawwwwww" (featuring Jozzy)	Xeon; Jozzy	2:53
3.	"Plunging Asymptote" (featuring Juliana Huxtable)	Xeon; Juliana Huxtable	4:37
4.	"The Dome's Protection" (featuring Nina Kraviz)	Xeon; Nina Kraviz	7:37
5.	"Reason Why" (featuring Kim Petras and BC Kingdom)	Xeon; Kim Petras; Eric Scoggins; Christopher Cummings	3:53
6.	"Live in My Truth" (featuring BC Kingdom and Liz)	Xeon; Scoggins; Cummings; Elizabeth Nicole Abrams	4:04
7.	"Why Lies" (featuring BC Kingdom and Liz)	Xeon; Scoggins; Cummings; Abrams	4:19
8.	"Do You Wanna Be Alive?" (featuring Big Sister)	Xeon; Signe Pierce	4:10
9.	"Elegance" (featuring Popstar)	Xeon; Popstar	4:51
10.	"Berlin Nightmare" (featuring Evita Manji)	Xeon; Evita Manji	3:36
11.	"Gallop" (featuring Evita Manji)	Xeon; Manji	1:57
12.	"One More Time" (featuring Popstar)	Xeon; Popstar	3:21
13.	"Exhilarate" (featuring Bibi Bourelly)	Xeon; Badriia Bourelly; Kennedi Lykken	4:24
14.	"Always and Forever" (featuring Hannah Diamond)	Xeon; Hannah Amond; David Shaw^{[a]}; Roland Clark^{[a]}; Charlene Munford^{[a]}	4:50
15.	"My Forever" (featuring Cecile Believe)	Xeon; Cecile Believe	4:04
16.	"Love Me off Earth" (featuring Doss)	Xeon; Doss; M Zavos-Costales; Thora Siemsen	3:54
Total length:			67:02

Notes

- ^{^[a]} "Always and Forever" contains an interpolation of "One Man" by Chanelle.

== Personnel ==
- Sophie – production
- Benny Long – production
- Alex Evans – mixing
- Matt Colton – mastering
- Renata Baksha – creative direction, photo art
- XK Studio – cover art
- International Magic – design, gatefold art
- Calum Morton – artistic consultation

== Charts ==
Chart performance for Sophie
Chart (2024)	Peak position
Australian Albums (ARIA)	73
Belgian Albums (Ultratop Flanders)	169
Scottish Albums (OCC)	10
UK Albums (OCC)	98
UK Dance Albums (OCC)	6
UK Independent Albums (OCC)	7
US Heatseekers Albums (Billboard)	26
US Top Album Sales (Billboard)	27
US Top Dance Albums (Billboard)	9

== Release history ==
Release dates and formats for Sophie
Region	Date	Format(s)	Label	Ref.
Various	25 September 2024	Digital download; streaming	MSMSMSM; Transgressive	
Various	27 September 2024	CD; LP	MSMSMSM; Transgressive	
