= Fuck It Up (disambiguation) =

"Fuck It Up" is a song by Iggy Azalea for her 2019 album In My Defense.

Fuck It Up may also refer to:

- "Fuck It Up", a song by Towers of London on their 2006 album Blood, Sweat and Towers
- "Fuck It Up", a 2017 non-album single in the YG discography
- Fuck It Up, a 2021 EP by Basside and Sophie
