= Tayhana =

Argentinian DJ

Tayhana is an Argentinian DJ based in Mexico City, where she collaborated with the N.A.A.F.I. label. She studied film at Escuela Nacional de Experimentación y Realización Cinematográfica (ENERC) in Buenos Aires, where, in 2013, she co-founded the art collective HiedraH. She has produced for Rosalía, where she produced the song "CUUUUuuuuuute” for Motomami (2022), as well as for GAIKA, and Eck Echo. Her role in the dance music scene has been referred to as reflecting anti-machismo and anti-racist themes.

== Discography ==
Albums

- Tierra del Fuego (2019)
