= Signe Pierce =

American artist (born 1988)

- Education: School of Visual Arts
- Notable work: americanreflexxx.com
- Website: signepierce.tumblr.com

Signe Pierce is an American artist who has worked in performance, photography, video and digital art. Her works, which "span photography, performance, and installation", have been shown at the Museum of Contemporary Art in Los Angeles, at the Museum of Modern Art and the New Museum in New York, and at the Palais de Tokyo in Paris.

Pierce has a BFA in photography from the School of Visual Arts in Manhattan.

In 2013, she performed in a short film, American Reflexxx, shot by her girlfriend Alli Coates. It shows Pierce, in a short dress and a mirror-finish mask, moving through the streets of Myrtle Beach, South Carolina, where she is derided and then attacked. It was shown at "Bushwick Gone Basel", an event in a bar in Miami Beach during Art Basel Miami in 2013, and at the BHFQU Brucennial in 2014. It has been watched more than 1.7 million times on YouTube. Rhizome called it "a brave work that construes many related topics within current cyberfeminist discourses", while Art F City said it was "terrifying, surreal—and true."

Pierce's work draws upon exaggerated hyperfeminine aesthetics, such as Barbie accessories and pink and purple neon lights. She has said she identifies as a feminist but has "been thinking about the binary aspects of the term 'feminist' and how we can move past gendered terms in general."

Pierce records music under the name Big Sister and collaborated on several tracks with Sophie before the producer's death in 2021. One of these, "Do U Wanna Be Alive," was later released on Sophie's posthumous album.

Pierce's work has also been shown at the Castor Gallery's SATELLITE Art Show (2016), the Nathalie Halgand Galerie in Vienna (2017), and the Annka Kultys Gallery in London (2018 & 2019). In 2020, Pierce's work was one of 35 artists included in "Time for Outrage!" at the Kunstpalast Düsseldorf.
