= Zutzut =

Mexican music producer

ZutZut is the stage name of Alejandro Nuñez Ferrara, a Mexican electronic music producer and DJ, born in 1986, in Monterrey, Mexico. He has released music under the N.A.A.F.I collective. He has been involved in the Mexican electronic music scene as a DJ since 2006. He played at the Vive Latino Festival in 2014, the SXSW festival in 2016, the Sónar festival in 2017, as well as Boiler Room for the ten-year anniversary of N.A.A.F.I. in 2020. He has produced for GAIKA and Dedekind Cut, as well as remixed for Nick León and Omega Sapien. His tracks on a 2015 bootleg N.A.A.F.I release Pirata 2 were compared to the sounds of Bad Bunny's YHLQMDLG (2020) album.

His music has been referred to as not replicating "conventional dancefloor jams", but rather as evoking a more cathartic response in the listener. It has also been conveyed as reflecting his ancestry yet with an unconventional sound that is oriented toward the future. Speaking on his EP Placas in an interview with The Fader, Zutzut commented: "Like all my work I tried to canalize bad energy into something positive, and even if the general vibe of the EP is tension and paranoid you also can find those little moment of beauty to rest — like life".

== Discography ==
Albums

- El Pack, Vol. 1 (2015)
- El Pack, Vol. 2 (2020)

EPs

- Zutzut (2014)
- Placas (2017)

Popular Songs

- Plexo
- Ancestors Dance
- Métele
- Ke Tu Kiere?
- Ojos Negros
- Placas
- Te Chupo Todx
