= Bibi Bourelly =

German singer-songwriter (born 1994)

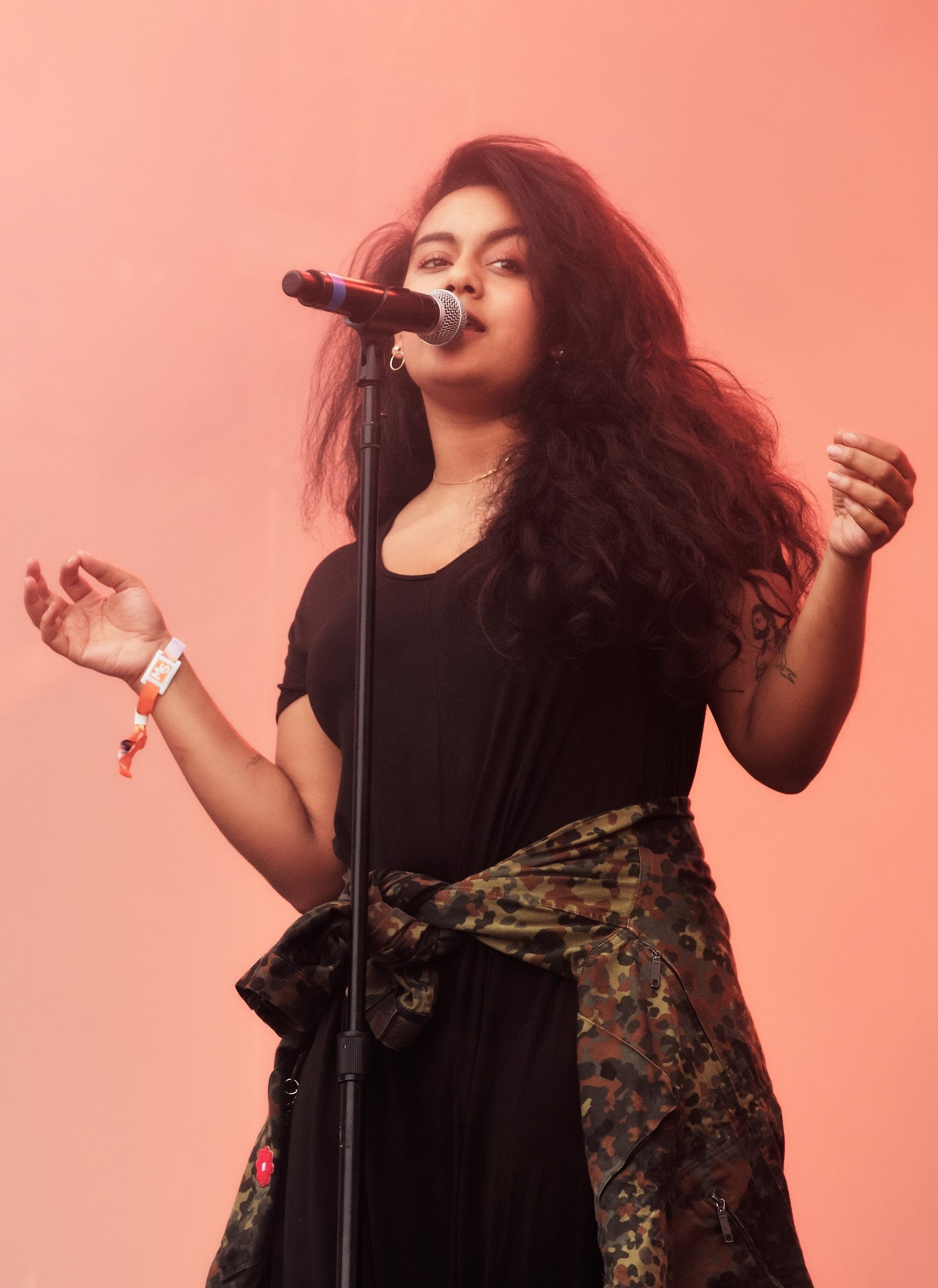
- Bourelly in 2017

Background information
- Born: Badriia Ines Bourelly; 14 July 1994 (age 32); Berlin, Germany
- Genres: Soul; alternative R&B
- Occupations: Singer; songwriter
- Years active: 2013–present
- Labels: Circa 13; Def Jam

Badriia Ines "Bibi" Bourelly (born 14 July 1994) is a German singer and songwriter signed to Def Jam Recordings. She has co-written several notable songs including Rihanna's "Bitch Better Have My Money" and "Higher", Demi Lovato's "Anyone" and Nick Brewer's "Talk to Me". Bourelly is featured on tracks such as Lil Wayne's "Without You", and Usher's "Chains". She also released two singles in 2015 ("Riot" and "Ego"), and in 2018 she released her first single "Writer's Song" in preparation for the release of her debut studio album later in 2018.

== Early life ==
Badriia Ines Bourelly was born on 14 July 1994 in Berlin, Germany, and is of Haitian and Moroccan descent. Her father, Jean-Paul Bourelly, is a notable guitarist and her late mother was the head of the Art Department at Berlin's House of the World’s Cultures. Because her father was a professional musician, Bourelly often attended concerts and wrote songs as young as age four. Her mother died when Bourelly was six years old. She first went on tour with her father when she was 11. She attended Blake High School in Maryland until the 12th grade, graduating in August 2013 after completing summer school. Bourelly stated she has German and American citizenship.

== Career ==
While still living in Maryland, Bourelly began working with producer Paperboy Fabe. He would later arrange for her to have a session with Kanye West in Los Angeles. That session ultimately produced Rihanna's "Higher", which Bourelly wrote in about 30 minutes. Around the same time, Rihanna heard another of Bourelly's written songs, "Bitch Better Have My Money", and decided to make it the lead single off her 2016 album, Anti.

In April 2015, Bourelly released her first single, "Riot", a song that discusses Bourelly's wish to be recognized as an "authentic" and legitimate musician. In July 2015, she was featured on Lil Wayne's "Without You", which appeared on his Free Weezy Album. A month later, she was featured in (and co-wrote) Nick Brewer's "Talk to Me". She also co-wrote (with Chris Braide) Selena Gomez's "Camouflage" from her album Revival, and was featured in Usher's single "Chains" alongside Nas. She performed the latter song with Usher and Nas at the Tidal X Concert in October 2015.

In October 2015, Bourelly released another single, "Ego". The song made it onto the Spotify Viral Charts for several nations, peaking at No. 2 in the US, No. 8 in the UK, and No. 4 on the overall global charts. The song has been described as a "powerful, unapologetic ballad to self confidence". The music video for "Ego" was filmed in Bourelly's hometown of Berlin and was directed by Branwen Okpako.

In March 2016, the third single, "Sally", was released accompanied by an interactive video. She made her television debut on NBC's Tonight Show with Jimmy Fallon. In the summer of 2016, Bourelly toured with Haim and Rihanna prior to going on her solo "Free the Real" tour in North America. She was also featured in the well-known Women Who Dare campaign by Harper's Bazaar alongside Hillary Clinton, Iskra Lawrence, and Uma Thurman.

== Discography ==
=== EPs ===
List of EPs, with selected details
Title	Details
Free the Real (Pt. 1)	Released: 6 May 2016; Label: Def Jam; Format: Digital download
Free the Real (Pt. 2)	Released: 11 November 2016; Label: Def Jam; Format: Digital download
Boy (In Studio)	Released: 18 August 2017; Label: Def Jam; Format: Digital download

=== Singles ===
==== As lead artist ====
Title	Year	Peak chart positions	Album
Title	Year	US R&B/HH Airplay	Album
"Riot"	2015	—	Free the Real (Pt. #1)
"Ego"	2015	—	Free the Real (Pt. #1)
"Sally"	2016	—	Free the Real (Pt. #1)
"Perfect." (with Earl St. Clair)	2016	—	Free the Real (Pt. #2)
"Ballin"	2016	26	Free the Real (Pt. #2)
"Writer's Song"	2018	—	TBA
"White House"	2018	—	TBA
"Wet"	2019	—	TBA
"—" denotes a single that did not chart or was not released in that territory.

==== As featured artist ====
Title	Year	Peak chart positions		Certifications	Album
Title	Year	US	UK	Certifications	Album
"Talk to Me" (Nick Brewer featuring Bibi Bourelly)	2015	—	19	BPI: Silver	Recreation
"Chains" (Usher featuring Nas and Bibi Bourelly)	2015	—	—		Non-album single
"Stupid World" (Hermitude featuring Bibi Bourelly)	2018	—	—	ARIA: Gold	Pollyanarchy
"Zulu Screams" (GoldLink featuring Maleek Berry and Bibi Bourelly)	2019	—	—		Diaspora
"One Day" (Tokimonsta featuring Bibi Bourelly and Jean Deaux)	2020	—	—		Oasis Nocturno
"Don't Get Too Close" (Skrillex featuring Bibi Bourelly and Sonny Moore)	2023	—	—		Don't Get Too Close
"Still Here (with the ones I came with)" (Skrillex featuring Bibi Bourelly and Porter Robinson)	2023	—	—		Quest for Fire
"Exhilarate" (Sophie featuring Bibi Bourelly)	2024	—	—		Sophie
"—" denotes a single that did not chart or was not released in that territory.

=== Guest appearances ===
Selected list of non-single guest appearances, with other performing artists, showing year released and album name
Title	Year	Other artist(s)	Album
"Without You"	2015	Lil Wayne	Free Weezy Album
"Faceshopping (Money Mix)"	2019	Sophie	Oil of Every Pearl's Un-Insides Non-Stop Remix Album
"Bibi's Interlude"	2021	Roddy Ricch	Live Life Fast
"Exhilarate"	2024	Sophie	SOPHIE

=== Songwriting credits ===
Title	Year	Artist(s)	Album	Credits	Written with
"Bitch Better Have My Money"	2015	Rihanna	Non-album single	Co-writer	Robyn Fenty, Kanye West, Ebony Oshunrinde, Jacques Webster, Jamille Pierre
"Without You" (featuring Bibi Bourelly)	2015	Lil Wayne	Free Weezy Album	Featured artist/co-writer	Dwayne Carter Jr., Jeroen Visscher, Vincent Schenck
"Talk to Me" (featuring Bibi Bourelly)	2015	Nick Brewer	Non-album single	Featured artist/co-writer	Nicholas Brewer, Tony Amadi, James Grant, Darius Forde, Crystal Waters, Neal Conway, Nathaniel Hardy Jr.
"Camouflage"	2015	Selena Gomez	Revival	Co-writer	Christopher Braide
"Chains" (featuring Bibi Bourelly & Nas)	2015	Usher	Non-album single	Featured artist/co-writer	Usher Raymond IV, Paul Epworth, Juan Najera, Miguel Gandelman, Arthur Strong, Issiah J. Avila, Albert Bowman, Nasir Jones
"Yeah, I Said It"	2016	Rihanna	Anti	Co-writer	Robyn Fenty, Timothy Mosley, Evon Barnes, Daniel Jones, Chris Godbey, Jean-Paul Bourelly
"Higher"	2016	Rihanna	Anti	Co-writer	Robyn Fenty, Ernest Wilson, James Fauntleroy, Jerry Butler, Kenny Gamble, Leon Huff
"Pose"	2016	Rihanna	Anti	Co-writer	Robyn Fenty, Chauncey Hollis, Jacques Webster
"Hard II Love"	2016	Usher	Hard II Love	Co-writer	Usher Raymond IV, Yonatan Ayal
"Bad to the Bone" (featuring Bibi Bourelly)	2016	Little Simz	Stillness in Wonderland	Featured artist/co-writer	Simbiatu Abiola, Ebony Oshunrinde, Bryan "Eastbound" Anthony
"Interlude" (featuring Bibi Bourelly)	2016	Little Simz	Age 101: Drop X	Featured artist/co-writer	Simbiatu Abiola
"I Have Questions"	2017	Camila Cabello	Crying in the Club (Note: Featured on the 7-inch extended play Crying in the Club, "Camila Cabello - Crying In The Club Limited 7" LP | Urban Outfitters". US: Urban Outfitters. 28 June 2017. Archived from the original on 23 April 2019.)	Co-writer	Camila Cabello, Jesse Shatkin
"Customz" (featuring Bibi Bourelly)	2017	Little Simz	Stillness in Wonderland	Featured artist/co-writer	Simbiatu Abiola, Mathieu Rakotozafy
"Cover Girls" (featuring Bibi Bourelly)	2017	Hitimpulse	Non-album single	Featured artist/co-writer	Thomas Baxter, Adam Midgley, Gerard O'Connell
"Accelerate" (featuring Ty Dolla Sign & 2 Chainz)	2018	Christina Aguilera	Liberation	Co-writer	Christina Aguilera, Kanye West, Michael Dean, Christopher Pope, Ernest Brown, Carlton Mays Jr., Ilsey Juber, Taylor Parks, Kirby Lauryen Dockery, Tyrone Griffin Jr., Tauheed Epps, Ronald Brown
"Tie Me Down" (with Elley Duhé)	2018	Gryffin	Gravity	Co-writer	Daniel Griffith, Aaron Forbes, Jussi Karvinen, Nathaniel Cyphert, Sarah Aarons
"GTFO"	2018	Mariah Carey	Caution	Co-writer	Mariah Carey, Paul Jeffries, Jordan Manswell, Porter Robinson
"Kumbaya" (featuring Bibi Bourelly)	2018	Jacob Banks	Village	Featured artist/co-writer	Jacob Banks, Ryan Vojtesak
"Stupid World" (featuring Bibi Bourelly)	2018	Hermitude	Non-album single	Featured artist/co-writer	Angus Stuart, Luke Dubber
"Anyone"	2020	Demi Lovato	Dancing with the Devil... the Art of Starting Over	Co-writer	Demi Lovato, Dayyon Alexander, Eyelar Mirzazadeh, Jay Mooncie, Sam Roman
"Thousand Miles (Featuring Brandi Carlile)"	2023	Miley Cyrus	Endless Summer Vacation	Co-writer	Miley Cyrus, Tobias Jesso Jr., Michael Len Williams II
"Zen"	2025	Jennie	Ruby	Co-writer	Jennie, Jelli Dorman, Asheton Hogan, Kirsten Spencer
"Damn Right" (featuring Childish Gambino & Kali Uchis)	2025	Jennie	Ruby	Co-writer	Jennie, Donald Glover, Karly Marina-Loaiza, Jean Day Jr., Samuel Gloade, Michael Williams Len II, Ariowa Irosogie
"F.T.S."	2025	Jennie	Ruby	Co-writer	Jennie, Asheton Hogan, Carly Gibert, Christopher Newlin
"Seoul City"	2025	Jennie	Ruby	Co-writer	Jennie, Myles Harris, Braylin Bowman, Xeryus Gittens, Michael Len Williams II, Carly Gibert
"Starlight"	2025	Jennie	Ruby	Co-writer	Jennie, Asheton Hogan, Armel Potter, Carly Gibert, Michael Len Williams II, Ariowa Irosogie
"Twin"	2025	Jennie	Ruby	Co-writer	Jennie, Christopher Newlin, Michael Len Williams II
"Less Than a Lover"	2026	Jennie	Fallen Angel	Co-writer	Jennie, Tyler Spry, Magnus Høiberg, Deborah Jung, Jelli Dorman
"Sweettooth"	2026	Jennie	Fallen Angel	Co-writer	Jennie, Tyler Spry, Sam Homaee, Finn Keane, Johnathan Bach, Jelli Dorman, Alexis Kesselman
"Lockitdown"	2026	Jennie	Fallen Angel	Co-writer	Jennie, Tyler Spry, Jelli Dorman
