= Nick Brewer =

English rapper (born 1989)

- Born: 1989 (age 36–37); East London, England
- Genres: Hip hop, Grime
- Occupation: Rapper
- Years active: 2010–present
- Label: Island Records
- Website: www.itsnickbrewer.co.uk

Nick Brewer (born 1989) is an English rapper. His 2015 song, "Talk To Me", charted at #19 on the UK Singles Chart.

== Background ==
Brewer was born in East London in 1989 but lived in Essex during his time at the University of Essex, where he studied history, and now operates out of a studio in Brick Lane. He was previously employed as a youth worker.

Brewer has released four EPs in collaboration with The Confect; 2010's Alone With My Thoughts, 2011's Alone With My Thoughts Part 2, 2013's Flat 10 and 2014's 4 Miles Further, the latter taking its name from the movement of The Confect's home studios to their new set up in Brick Lane. His 2014 single, "Fall From Here", featured Naomi Scott.

His 2015 single, "Talk to Me", was written by Brewer and Bibi Bourelly. The song samples "Gypsy Woman" by Crystal Waters. In an interview, Brewer said that Bourelly was invited into the studio after he found out through a mutual friend that she was in town writing for Ellie Goulding. The song charted at #19 on the UK Singles Chart and was later certified Silver by BPI in 2022.

Outside of music, Brewer is passionate about contributing to social change; one example is in him serving as a patron for UK charity Anxiety UK. Brewer is Christian.

== Awards and nominations ==
=== MOBO Awards ===
Year	Recipient/Nominated work	Award	Result
2015	Nick Brewer	Best Newcomer	Nominated
