= Field of Love =

Studio album by Mozart's Sister
- Released: March 17, 2017
- Length: 32:54
- Label: Arbutus

Mozart's Sister chronology
Being (2014)	Field of Love (2017)

Professional ratings
Aggregate scores
Source	Rating
Metacritic	70/100
Review scores
Source	Rating
AllMusic	3.5/5 stars
Exclaim!	6/10
Pitchfork	7.6/10
PopMatters	6/10

Field of Love is the second studio album by Canadian singer-songwriter Caila Thompson-Hannant, under her pseudonym Mozart's Sister It was released on February 17, 2017 through Arbutus Records.

== Track listing ==
No.	Title	Length
1.	"Eternally Girl"	3:08
2.	"Plastic Memories"	4:40
3.	"Moment 2 Moment"	3:58
4.	"Angel"	4:41
5.	"Bump"	2:57
6.	"Who Are You"	4:48
7.	"My Heart Is Wild"	3:56
8.	"Baroque Baby"	4:46
