= Nothing More to Say =

Single by Sophie
- B-side: "Eeehhh"
- Released: January 2013
- Genre: Electro house
- Length: 15:57
- Label: Huntleys + Palmers
- Songwriter: Sophie Xeon
- Producer: Sophie Xeon

Sophie singles chronology
"Nothing More to Say" (2013)	"Bipp" (2013)

Official mashup
- "Nothing More to Say / Eeehhh" on YouTube

"Nothing More to Say" is the debut single (Note: Some sources consider it an EP.) by the British music producer Sophie, released in January 2013 through Huntleys + Palmers. The single contains the song "Eeehhh" and two versions of the title track, one of which had involvement from DJ Jackmaster. These songs are of the electro house genre while containing pop elements. "Nothing More to Say" was acclaimed and considered one of Sophie's most essential songs. The single was reissued in early 2022.

== Background and release ==
Andrew Thomson, CEO of the label Huntleys + Palmers, first met Sophie at a soundcheck in 2011. In 2012, Sophie's remix of Auntie Flo's "Highlife" piqued the label's interest. Huntleys + Palmers first released "Nothing More to Say" in January 2013; Thomson said that it would've been released earlier if "distribution hadn't been as slow". The release of "Nothing More to Say" was accompanied by a quote by Sophie: "I try to make music which is fun to dance to—that should be the loudest voice talking. I think it would be extremely exciting if music could take you on the same sort of high-thrill three-minute ride as a theme park roller coaster". The single is composed of "Eeehhh" and two versions of "Nothing More to Say", a vocal mix and a dub version where DJ Jackmaster was involved. An official mashup combining "Nothing More to Say" and "Eeehhh" was also released.

== Composition ==
"Nothing More to Say"
"Nothing More to Say" is a pop-influenced electro house song.

The single was characterized as electro house, and multiple critics said that it contained elements of pop. Austin Jones of Paste described the three tracks as "energetic, dubby, with intense, ballroom vocals that twist and contort around candy-coated basslines", while The Vinyl Factory's Emily Hill said that the songs give feelings of "overwhelming sense of joy and freedom" due to their captivating hooks.

Junkee's Jared Richards said that "Nothing More to Say" and "Eeehhh" are "ecstatic tracks" featuring a blend of "synths, snares, and hard snaps" that appear in the song as if forming a Petri dish; Richards said that "Nothing More to Say" in particular was "more infectious [...] as if the song is straining under itself". Jordan Rothlein of Resident Advisor wrote that "Nothing More to Say" contains a 1986-like electro bassline and "reverb-y vocal", though its precision makes it feel "far from retro". According to Rothlein, the dub mix gives focus to the "swelling melody".

== Reception ==
"Nothing More to Say" was acclaimed, and Resident Advisor's Andrew Ryce wrote that it "took the UK house scene by storm". Dazed's Karen Orton described it as "a furiously exciting collision of fluro dance and tectonic NRG" and "worth the wait". Britt Julious of Pitchfork praised Sophie's effort in creating a "bright, cheerful, and instantly enjoyable" song. Jordan Rothlein of Resident Advisor described it as "a blast" and "[n]eon and sugary-sweet". The Line of Best Fit's Andriana Albert praised its addicting dance feel. Duncan Cooper of The Fader described it as "Mario Kart beats for a real-life Rainbow Road". XLR8R's Brad Stabler described the vocal mix as "[a]n outstanding club track no doubt", with "the backbone a banger should have".

"Nothing More to Say" was featured as one of Sophie's most essential songs in the lists published by The Fader and Junkee; writing for The Fader, Shaad D'Souza said: "Propulsive and gorgeous, it's one of Sophie's most straightforward songs and one of the best, showcasing in early, almost rudimentary ways, the producer's interest in repetitive, durable hooks and burbling synth sounds". Retrospectively, Jones said that the single "served as a prelude to the queer carnival Sophie would work towards crafting over the next several years". On 7 December 2021, Huntleys + Palmers CEO Andrew Thomson announced that "Nothing More to Say" would be reissued in early 2022, with the funds going towards the Scottish Trans Alliance. Thomson said that prices for the single increased drastically following Sophie's death, and he felt it was important to make more affordable copies of it. In June 2022, The Vinyl Factory named it one of the best reissues of the year until then, with Emily Hill writing that "it's the kind of feel good music you need in your life—forever and always".

== Track listing ==
"Nothing More to Say" digital track listing
No.	Title	Length
1.	"Nothing More to Say" (Dub)	5:25
2.	"Eeehhh"	4:41
3.	"Nothing More to Say" (Vox)	5:51
Total length:		15:57

== Personnel ==
- Sophie Xeon — writer, producer
- Jaide Green — voice ("Nothing More to Say" (Dub), "Nothing More to Say" (Vox))
- Eric Wrenn Office — art direction
