= Anxiety UK =

British mental health charity

Anxiety UK (formerly the National Phobics Society) is a UK national registered charity formed in 1970 for those affected by anxiety disorders. It is a user-led organisation, run by a small team of seven, many with their own lived experience of anxiety disorders. Anxiety UK is the largest national user-led charity dealing with anxiety in the UK.

Anxiety UK works to relieve and support those living with anxiety disorders by providing information, support and understanding via an extensive range of services and works regularly with external agencies and healthcare professionals to improve the service provision offered to those living with anxiety disorders. It also campaigns to raise awareness of anxiety disorders.

Anxiety UK offers the following paid for therapies: counselling, cognitive behavioural therapy, clinical hypnotherapy and acupuncture. The organisation offers therapy online, via the phone and face to face as well as email support .

Research from YouGov SixthSense has revealed that 21% of Britons are affected by anxiety today. In a survey covering Great Britain, one in six adults had experienced some form of neurotic health problem in the previous week. Research has also found that more than one in ten people are likely to have a disabling anxiety disorder at some stage in their life.

Celebrity patrons and ambassadors of Anxiety UK include: Rebecca Front, Marcus Trescothick, Ruby Wax, Simon Webbe, Naomi Moxon, Hannah Moxon, Martin Plowman and Nick Brewer.

== See also ==
- Mental health in the United Kingdom
