= Reason Why =

2024 posthumous Sophie song

Single by Sophie featuring Kim Petras and BC Kingdom

from the album Sophie
- Released: 24 June 2024
- Length: 3:52
- Label: Future Classic
- Songwriters: Sophie Xeon; Kim Petras; Eric Scoggins; Christopher Cummings
- Producers: Sophie; Benny Long

Sophie singles chronology
"Unisil" (2021)	"Reason Why" (2024)	"Berlin Nightmare" (2024)

Kim Petras singles chronology
"When We Were Young (The Logical Song)" (2023)	"Reason Why" (2024)	"Don't Lie" (2024)

BC Kingdom singles chronology
"Jeepz" (2018)	"Reason Why" (2024)

Audio video
- "Reason Why" on YouTube

"Reason Why" is a song by British producer Sophie featuring German singer Kim Petras and American duo BC Kingdom. The track was released on 24 June 2024 as the lead single of Sophie's posthumous self-titled album, released on 27 September.

== Background ==
Sophie's first studio album, Oil of Every Pearl's Un-Insides was released in 2018 to critical acclaim. Later on, Sophie was nearing completion of her second studio project before her sudden death in 2021. After her death, Sophie's brother Ben Long announced his intention to release the project that she would "be happy with". Up until 2024, posthumous projects by Sophie were sparse, including a collaboration with Jlin titled "Jsloipnhie".

Sophie played "Reason Why" in her live performances before it was leaked in 2019.

== Release ==
On 21 June 2024, an hour-long video, which listed a date for 24 June 2024 at 6:30 PM London Time along with different time zones, was posted to Sophie's YouTube channel. On the date, the song was released, accompanied by an announcement that her posthumous album, Sophie, would be released in September of the year.

== Personnel ==
- Sophie – production, writing
- BC Kingdom – vocals
- Kim Petras – vocals, writing
- Eric Scoggins – writing
- Christopher Cummings – writing
- Benny Long – production
- Alex Evans – mixing
- Matt Colton – mastering
