= When We Were Young (The Logical Song) =

Single by David Guetta and Kim Petras
- Released: 10 November 2023
- Genre: Eurodance, Bubblegum Dance
- Length: 2:27
- Label: What a DJ; Warner UK
- Songwriters: David Guetta; Jakke Erixson; Madison Love; Nick Long; Roger Hodgson
- Producers: David Guetta; Jakke Erixson

David Guetta singles chronology
"Big FU" (2023)	"When We Were Young (The Logical Song)" (2023)	"Vocation" (2023)

Kim Petras singles chronology
"Flashy" (2023)	"When We Were Young (The Logical Song)" (2023)	"Reason Why" (2024)

"When We Were Young (The Logical Song)" is a song by French DJ and producer David Guetta and German singer and songwriter Kim Petras, released as a single on 10 November 2023 through What a DJ and Warner Music UK. It was written by Guetta, Jakke Erixson, Madison Love, Nick Long and Roger Hodgson, and produced by Guetta and Erixson. The song interpolates the 1979 song "The Logical Song" by British rock band Supertramp, written by Roger Hodgson. It charted in the UK and across Europe.

== Track listing ==
Digital single track listing
No.	Title	Length
1.	"When We Were Young (The Logical Song)"	2:27
2.	"When We Were Young (The Logical Song)" (extended)	3:54

== Charts ==
=== Weekly charts ===
Weekly chart performance for "When We Were Young (The Logical Song)"
Chart (2023–2024)	Peak position
Austria (Ö3 Austria Top 40)	62
Belarus Airplay (TopHit)	26
Belgium (Ultratop 50 Flanders)	14
Belgium (Ultratop 50 Wallonia)	8
Bulgaria Airplay (PROPHON)	4
Canada CHR/Top 40 (Billboard)	37
CIS Airplay (TopHit)	17
Croatia International Airplay (Top lista)	20
Czech Republic Airplay (ČNS IFPI)	5
Estonia Airplay (TopHit)	7
France (SNEP)	45
Germany (GfK)	29
Global Excl. US (Billboard)	130
Hungary (Dance Top 40)	8
Hungary (Rádiós Top 40)	1
Ireland (IRMA)	66
Kazakhstan Airplay (TopHit)	32
Lithuania Airplay (TopHit)	22
Luxembourg (Billboard)	23
Moldova Airplay (TopHit)	6
Netherlands (Dutch Top 40)	5
Netherlands (Single Top 100)	11
New Zealand Hot Singles (RMNZ)	28
Poland (Polish Airplay Top 100)	21
Poland (Polish Streaming Top 100)	71
Romania Airplay (TopHit)	35
Russia Airplay (TopHit)	10
Slovakia Airplay (ČNS IFPI)	99
Sweden (Sverigetopplistan)	87
Switzerland (Schweizer Hitparade)	32
UK Singles (Official Charts)	51
UK Dance (Official Charts)	21
US Hot Dance/Electronic Songs (Billboard)	16

=== Monthly charts ===
Monthly chart performance for "When We Were Young (The Logical Song)"
Chart (2023–2024)	Position
Belarus Airplay (TopHit)	30
CIS Airplay (TopHit)	25
Estonia Airplay (TopHit)	7
Lithuania Airplay (TopHit)	45
Moldova Airplay (TopHit)	11
Romania Airplay (TopHit)	39
Russia Airplay (TopHit)	18

=== Year-end charts ===
2023 year-end chart performance for "When We Were Young (The Logical Song)"
Chart (2023)	Position
Netherlands (Dutch Top 40)	91

2024 year-end chart performance for "When We Were Young (The Logical Song)"
Chart (2024)	Position
Belarus Airplay (TopHit)	125
Belgium (Ultratop 50 Flanders)	46
Belgium (Ultratop 50 Wallonia)	42
CIS Airplay (TopHit)	75
Estonia Airplay (TopHit)	44
France (SNEP)	132
Hungary (Dance Top 40)	31
Hungary (Rádiós Top 40)	9
Netherlands (Dutch Top 40)	28
Netherlands (Single Top 100)	58
Russia Airplay (TopHit)	87
US Hot Dance/Electronic Songs (Billboard)	62

2025 year-end chart performance for "When We Were Young (The Logical Song)"
Chart (2025)	Position
Hungary (Dance Top 40)	82
Hungary (Rádiós Top 40)	32

== Certifications ==
Certifications for "When We Were Young (The Logical Song)"
Region	Certification	Certified units/sales
Belgium (BRMA)	Platinum	40,000^{‡}
Denmark (IFPI Danmark)	Gold	45,000^{‡}
France (SNEP)	Platinum	200,000^{‡}
Germany (BVMI)	Gold	300,000^{‡}
New Zealand (RMNZ)	Gold	15,000^{‡}
Poland (ZPAV)	Platinum	50,000^{‡}
Spain (Promusicae)	Gold	30,000^{‡}
Switzerland (IFPI Switzerland)	Platinum	30,000^{‡}
United Kingdom (BPI)	Silver	200,000^{‡}
^{‡} Sales+streaming figures based on certification alone.
