= Shapes and Sizes =

Canadian indie rock band

- Origin: Victoria, British Columbia, Canada
- Genre: Indie rock
- Label: Asthmatic Kitty
- Members: Rory Seydel; Caila Thompson-Hannant; Nathan Gage; John Crellin

Shapes and Sizes are a Canadian indie rock band from Victoria, British Columbia. There are four members—Nathan Gage, singers Caila Thompson-Hannant and Rory Seydel, and John Crellin.

== History ==
Shapes and Sizes came together in Victoria and self-released their self-titled first album in early 2006. The band signed with New York record label Asthmatic Kitty and became the only Canadian band on its roster. The label reissued the band's album in July 2006.

In January 2007, the band released a split 7-inch with The Weird Weeds as part of Asthmatic Kitty's new split 7-inch series, "Unusual Animals". The band's second full-length album, Split Lips, Winning Hips, A Shiner, was released in May 2007.

By 2009, Shapes and Sizes had moved to Montreal, and performed there as part of the 2009 Pop Montreal festival. The band released their third album Candle to Your Eyes in August 2010. The album contained an eclectic collection of rock styles, partly because there are two lead singers with dissimilar voices. In the fall that year the album appeared on the !Earshot National Top 50 Chart.

== Discography ==
Albums

- 2006 Shapes and Sizes (Asthmatic Kitty)
- 2007 Split Lips, Winning Hips, A Shiner (Asthmatic Kitty)
- 2010 Candle to Your Eyes (Asthmatic Kitty)

EPs

- 2007 "Castanets + Shapes and Sizes" (Asthmatic Kitty)

Singles

- 2007 "Jinker/That Fat Hand" from Unusual Animals, vol. 1, split 7-inch with The Weird Weeds (Asthmatic Kitty)
