= N.A.A.F.I =

Mexican DJ collective and record label

N.A.A.F.I (No Ambition And Fuck-all Interest) is a DJ collective, club night, and record label based in Mexico City. The collective was founded in 2010 through a series of parties first established by Alberto Bustamante a.k.a. Mexican Jihad and Fausto Bahía a.k.a. Tomás Davo.

N.A.A.F.I's sound has been described as being influenced by drum & bass, techno, Mexican hip-hop, South African house, the traditional and folk music styles of Latin America, brass-heavy banda, rolling reggaeton, and cumbia. N.A.A.F.I has been described as being on the cutting edge of Mexican club culture, valuing homegrown music styles over "malinchismo" or imported styles from the Anglophone. The label has been described along with Pan-African label NON Worldwide as part of a wave of club music from the Global South which has become increasingly visible in the latter half of the 2010s that has "helped to loosen the west’s stranglehold on club culture" and initiated a movement to "decolonize the dancefloor."

In 2017, their compilation album NAAFI 2.0 was released. In 2020, they released their ten-year anniversary compilation album NAAFI X. British musician GAIKA released his Seguridad EP on the label, featuring various artists from the collective, including Tayhana, Omaar, Lechuga Zafiro, Zutzut, Lao, Wasted Fates, and Debit.

== Discography ==
- Jamez Manuel - Agua Remixes (2012)
- Siete Catorce - Ep2 (2013)
- Paul Marmota - Nueva (2013)
- Lao - Catedral (2013)
- Smurphy - #Geminiss (2014)
- Various - N.A.A.F.I Tribal (2014)
- Javier Estrada - Tribal Prehispánico (2014)
- Various - N.A.A.F.I Tribal (2014)
- Imaabs - Distancia (2015)
- Various - NON vs N.A.A.F.I (2015)
- Mock The Zuma - Gauss (2016)
- Zutzut - Placas (2017)
- Lao - Perfil (2017)
- Various - N.A.A.F.I 2.0 (2017)
- Kali Mutsa & Imaabs - La Devoración (2017)
- OMAAR - NO! (2017)
- OMAAR - GTR (2017)
- MC Bin Laden - Tototo (2017)
- OMAAR - Progressive Tribes (2017)
- Lechuga Zafiro - Testigo (2018)
- Debit - Animus (2018)
- Wasted Fates - Mundialero (2018)
- Lao & Speak - Singularity (2019)
- Taso x Siete Catorce - Grandes Éxitos (Vol. 1) (2019)
- Wasted Fates - Turbio (2019)
- Linn da Quebrada & Lao - fake dói (2019)
- Debit - SYSTEM (2019)
- WRACK - Despertar 醒 (2019)
- Tayhana - Tierra del Fuego (2019)
- Various - NAAFI X (2020)
- Nick León - Aguacero (2020)
- GAIKA - Seguridad EP (2020)
- Lila Tirando a Violeta - Limerencia (2020)
- Dj Fucci - FAUNA EP (2021)
- OMAAR - Drum Temple (2021)
