= 9 (After Coachella) =

Single by Cashmere Cat featuring MØ and Sophie

from the album 9
- Released: 30 March 2017
- Length: 4:32
- Label: Mad Love; Interscope
- Songwriters: Magnus August Høiberg; Benny Blanco; Karen Marie Ørsted; Sophie Xeon
- Producers: Cashmere Cat; Benny Blanco; Sophie

Cashmere Cat singles chronology
"Love Incredible" (2017)	"9 (After Coachella)" (2017)	"Quit" (2017)

MØ singles chronology
"Don't Leave" (2017)	"9 (After Coachella)" (2017)	"Nights with You" (2017)

Sophie singles chronology
"Vyzee" (2015)	"9 (After Coachella)" (2017)	"It's Okay to Cry" (2017)

"9 (After Coachella)" is a song by the Norwegian producer Cashmere Cat featuring the Danish singer MØ and the British producer Sophie. It was released on 30 March 2017 as the fourth single from Cashmere Cat's debut studio album, 9, along with a lyric video. A music video was released on 25 April. In 2021, Katie Bain of Billboard named it one of Sophie's best songs, productions or features.

== Chart performance ==
Chart performance for "9 (After Coachella)"
Chart (2017)	Peak position
US Hot Dance/Electronic Songs (Billboard)	47
