= Basic Volume =

Studio album by Gaika
- Released: 27 July 2018
- Genres: Alternative R&B; electronic
- Length: 56:52
- Label: Warp

Singles from Basic Volume
- 1. "Crown & Key" Released: 6 June 2018; 2. "Immigrant Sons (Pesos & Gas)" Released: 11 July 2018

Professional ratings
Aggregate scores
Source	Rating
Metacritic	77/100
Review scores
Source	Rating
AllMusic	3/5 stars
The Guardian	4/5 stars
The Line of Best Fit	9/10

Basic Volume is the debut studio album by English electronic artist Gaika. It was released in July 2018 under Warp Records.

== Accolades ==
Publication	Accolade	Rank	Ref.
Gigwise	Top 51 Albums of 2018	8	
The Independent	Top 40 Albums of 2018	9	
The Line of Best Fit	Top 50 Albums of 2018	47	

== Track listing ==
No.	Title	Length
1.	"Basic Volume"	3:26
2.	"Hackers & Jackers"	4:29
3.	"Seven Churches for St. Jude"	5:43
4.	"Ruby"	2:05
5.	"Born Thieves"	4:33
6.	"36 Oaths"	2:06
7.	"Black Empire (Killmonger Riddim)"	2:40
8.	"Grip"	3:27
9.	"Clouds, Chemicals and the Angel Gabriel"	1:21
10.	"Immigrant Sons (Pesos & Gas)"	4:20
11.	"Close to the Root"	4:16
12.	"Yard"	4:41
13.	"Crown & Key"	5:11
14.	"Warlord Shoes"	4:01
15.	"Spectacular Anthem"	4:31
