= Fuck It Up (EP) =

EP by Basside
- Released: 2 April 2021
- Recorded: 2016
- Length: 18:55
- Label: Sorry
- Producer: Sophie

Basside chronology
| Basside (2017) | Fuck It Up (2021) |

Fuck It Up is an extended play by the American duo Basside produced by the British music producer Sophie, released on 2 April 2021 through Sorry Records.

== Background and release ==
Basside is a Miami duo formed by Que Linda (real name Linda Attias) and Caro Loca (real name Carolina Villalba). After watching Basside play at the III Points Festival in 2016, Sophie invited them to the musician's studio in Los Angeles to record the EP. Since then, the EP's tracks became popular in Sophie's DJ sets and circulated online as bootlegs. Que Linda said the prolonged dormancy was due to a miscommunication with their management. In February 2021, following Sophie's death, Basside released the musician's remix of their song "NYC2MIA", with the proceeds donated to the Sylvia Rivera Law Project, and announced the EP. On March 17, 2021, Basside released its first single, the title track. The EP was released on 2 April 2021.

== Reception ==
Professional ratings
Review scores
| Source | Rating |
|---|---|
| Pitchfork | 6.9/10 |

Colin Joyce of Pitchfork gave Fuck It Up a 6.9/10 rating.
