= Evita Manji =

Greek musician

- Manji performing in Berlin

Background information
- Born: Evangelia Delipetkou Manazi; Thessaloniki, Greece
- Genres: Deconstructed club; Art pop; Avant-pop
- Occupations: Music producer; DJ; songwriter
- Years active: 2016-present
- Labels: Myxoxym; Pan
- Partner: Sophie (2020-2021)

Evangelia Delipetkou Manazi, known as Evita Manji, is a Greek singer, songwriter, producer and vocalist. Manji runs the record label Myxoxym. They were the partner of the late musician Sophie, who died in 2021. Manji is featured on two tracks of Sophie's self-titled, posthumous album Sophie: "Berlin Nightmare" and "Gallop" released in 2024.

== Discography ==
=== EPs ===
- Neptune (2020)

=== Albums ===
- Spandrel? (2023)

=== Singles ===
- "OIL TOO MUCH" (2021)
- "EYES/NOT ENOUGH" (2021)
- "Body/Prison" (2022)
- "Closer To Midnight" (2023)
