= Faceshopping =

2018 song by Sophie

Single by Sophie

from the album Oil of Every Pearl's Un-Insides
- Released: 16 February 2018
- Length: 3:57
- Label: Future Classic
- Songwriters: Sophie Xeon; Caila Thompson-Hannant
- Producer: Sophie

Sophie singles chronology
"Ponyboy" (2017)	"Faceshopping" (2018)	"1, 2, 3 Dayz Up" (2019)

Music video
- "Faceshopping" on YouTube

"Faceshopping" is a song recorded by British music producer Sophie featuring vocals by Canadian musician Cecile Believe. It was released as the third and final single for Sophie's full-length debut album, Oil of Every Pearl's Un-Insides, on 16 February 2018.

"Faceshopping" received acclaim from music critics, with particular praise for its production; The Line of Best Fit and Mixmag named it one of the best songs of the 2018. Several publications have called it one of Sophie's best songs retrospectively. A music video, directed by Sophie and Aaron Chan, was released on 4 April 2018. Featuring aesthetics inspired by materialism and a distorted CGI replica of Sophie's face, it was positively received by critics and noted as expanding on the song's themes.

== Background and release ==
In October 2017, Sophie released the single "It's Okay to Cry". The song and accompanying music video marked the first instance Sophie's face and vocals appeared in the artist's own work. A second single, "Ponyboy", was released later in 2017.

"Faceshopping" was released on 16 February 2018. The album Oil of Every Pearl's Un-Insides was announced on 5 June and released ten days later.

In an interview with Jezebel, Sophie stated that the song's title was a response to people's belief that since she was a faceless artist, she was "trying to hide something". In a separate article with The Face, she described the song as "kind of a snapshot of how it felt to be in my body at that particular time, with all the pressures that are on everyone, and just existing or cultivating some kind of public persona. It’s an ongoing debate in my head, with a lot of the same questions. You consider and then reconsider".

== Composition and lyrics ==
In an interview with Vogue, Sophie elaborated that the track was "about the emphasised idea that if you’re showing more face, you're somehow being more real. But of course, there is a flip side to that, where you have false identities or different projections of yourself that you’re able to cultivate through your image."

== Critical reception ==
"Faceshopping" received acclaim from music critics. Katie Olsen of Cool Hunting praised the track as a "glitchy, gloriously abrasive banger", noting it as "incredibly textured, [...] mechanical and metallic, yet has plenty of pop flourishes to keep it accessible." Stereogum called the song Sophie's best work since the compilation album Product (2015), lauding it as "filthy as fuck, with a beat like rusty scalpels, and intermittently gorgeous". Similarly, The Interns's Sam Murphy described it as "the hardest thing she's done in a while". Vice's Lauren O'Neil said that the song's subject matter might make it "her fiercest mission statement so far." Writing for the Music, Camilla Patini favored the song over Sophie's previous single, "Ponyboy", opining that:

If 'Ponyboy' was about advertising and the primacy of the image (amongst other things), the lyrics didn't do a great job at fleshing out the concept, but 'Faceshopping' does this much better. It is more thoughtful and tightly constructed. The breakdown, especially, has a raw emotional intensity that does a great job at further amplifying the song's message.

Nylon named it one of the best releases of the week. Several publications have named it one of Sophie's best songs.

=== Accolades ===
Ranking "Faceshopping" as the fourth best song of 2018, Luke Cartledge of The Line of Best Fit lauded it for "providing a perfect distillation of everything that makes Sophie one of 2018’s most important artists. [...] 'Faceshopping' demonstrates that talent to electrifying effect". He ended its entry by calling the song "[d]efiant, cathartic and utterly vital". Calling it the 49th best song of the same year, Mixmag described its sound as "[a]n intense yet beautifully twisted combination of pop and schizophrenic sound design like no other."

Select year-end rankings for "Faceshopping"
Publication	List	Rank	Ref.
The Line of Best Fit	The Fifty Best Songs of 2018	4	
Mixmag	The 50 Best Tracks of 2018	49	

== Music video ==
Sophie's face is heavily distorted in the music video, which Vrinda Jagota of Paper compared to the shaping of clay.

The music video for "Faceshopping", directed by Sophie and Aaron Chan, was released on 4 April 2018. Animated by Esteban Diacono, it was produced by the production company Industry Plant. The visuals used in the video were used as projections for Sophie's live shows prior to its release. A press release accompanying the video's release described it as a continuation of "SOPHIE's examination of materialism and aesthetics on both societal and personal levels with curious distortions of conventional images."

In the music video, a digital replica of Sophie's face is transformed in several ways, such as being cut up, spliced, and distorted. Vrinda Jagota of Paper compared the morphing of her face as being similar to that of clay, while Spin's Dale Eisinger referred to its visuals as "the producer's face [getting] chopped and screwed, quite literally" Vivian Yeung of Crack described Sophie's face in the music video as "stretching and inflating with a rubber band elasticity." Images of Sophie's face are intercut with quick shots of beauty products, skin, and iconography inspired by Coca-Cola. The video features flashing lights, with phrases such as "artificial bloom", "hydroponic skin", and "plastic surgery" periodically flashing onscreen.

Critics generally interpreted the music video for "Faceshopping" as expanding upon the original song's themes. Jagota felt that the music video "drives home the song's exploration of authenticity and personal autonomy in a world that allows and encourages bodily modification." Similarly, Vice's Phil Witmer said it "[illustrates] the themes of URL identity and the many facades we present online." He felt that no other artists "—save maybe Arca and other forward-thinking electronic musicians—" were making music videos like Sophie's. Kaltblut Magazine called it one of the best music videos of the week.

== Personnel ==
- Sophie – production, composition
- Cecile Believe – vocals, composition
