= Chanelle (singer) =

American singer

- Also known as: Chanelle
- Born: Charlene Renee Munford; Virginia, U.S.
- Genres: Garage; house; R&B
- Instrument: Vocals
- Years active: 1987–present

Chanelle (born Charlene Renee Munford) is an American singer who had a British hit single with “One Man” in 1989.

== Life ==
Born in Virginia and raised in Newark, New Jersey, Chanelle moved to New York City to study law, but dropped out to perform in musical theatre, and giving jazz and blues concerts in the city's supper clubs. She signed to the Profile label in 1988 and one of her first recordings, "One Man", reached no. 16 in the UK chart in March 1989; a remixed version made the top 50 in December 1994. The chart performance earned her a place on the 16 March 1989 edition of Top of the Pops.

The single also reached no. 70 in the Billboard R&B charts in May 1989.

After a hiatus to raise a family, she returned to the music industry in 2011, and has continued recording and performing.
