= Ponyboy (song) =

Single by Sophie

from the album Oil of Every Pearl's Un-Insides
- Released: 7 December 2017
- Genre: Hyperpop
- Length: 3:13
- Label: MSMSMSM; Future Classic; Transgressive
- Songwriters: Sophie Xeon; Caila Thompson-Hannant
- Producer: Sophie Xeon

Sophie singles chronology
"It's Okay to Cry" (2017)	"Ponyboy" (2017)	"Faceshopping" (2018)

"Ponyboy" is a song recorded by the British music producer Sophie. It was released on 7 December 2017 as the second single from her debut studio album, Oil of Every Pearl's Un-Insides (2018). It was accompanied by a music video. "Ponyboy" was featured as one of the artist's best or most essential songs in the lists published by Billboard, NME, and The Guardian. The Forty-Five's Sophie Walker named it the 16th best hyperpop song of all time.
