= It's Okay to Cry =

Single by Sophie

from the album Oil of Every Pearl's Un-Insides
- Released: 19 October 2017
- Genre: Synth-pop; dream pop
- Length: 3:50
- Label: Future Classic
- Songwriter: Sophie Xeon
- Producer: Sophie Xeon

Sophie singles chronology
"9 (After Coachella)" (2017)	"It's Okay to Cry" (2017)	"Ponyboy" (2017)

Music video
- "It's Okay to Cry" on YouTube

"It's Okay to Cry" is a song recorded by British music producer Sophie. It was released on 19 October 2017 as the first single from the artist's debut studio album, Oil of Every Pearl's Un-Insides (2018), accompanied by a music video. This was the first time Sophie's vocals were featured in her work.

== Background and release ==
Early in the artist's career, Sophie was noted for her reclusive nature, rarely giving interviews and using press photos that obscured her appearance. She was widely believed to be a cisgender man and was criticized for "gender appropriation" for drawing from hyperfeminine aesthetics and performing under the name Sophie.

"It's Okay to Cry" and the accompanying music video, both released on 19 October 2017, are the first works by Sophie to feature her own face and voice and were interpreted by many as the artist's first public acknowledgement of her transgender identity.

== Reception and legacy ==
Vice music critic Lauren O'Neill praised "It's Okay to Cry" as a new stylistic direction for Sophie. "It's Okay to Cry" was featured as one of the artist's best songs in lists published by The Guardian and Billboard. Frequent Sophie collaborator Charli XCX included the song "So I" on her 2024 studio album Brat as a tribute to Sophie, with lyrics that refer to "It's Okay to Cry." In October 2025, New York City mayoral candidate Zohran Mamdani released a video about trans history that used an instrumental version of "It's Okay to Cry" as its soundtrack.

=== Accolades ===
"It's Okay to Cry" was named one of the best songs of 2017 by Billboard, Dazed, The Fader, The Line of Best Fit, and Vice.

Accolades for "It's Okay to Cry"
Publication	List	Rank	Ref.
Billboard	100 best songs of 2017	92	
Dazed	The 20 best tracks of 2017	5	
The Fader	The 101 best songs of 2017	96	
The Line of Best Fit	The fifty best songs of 2017	45	
Vice	The 100 best songs of 2017	86	

== Music video ==
In the self-directed music video for "It's Okay to Cry", Sophie appears for the first time in the artist's own work, singing in front of the sky as the weather changes.

== Personnel ==
- Sophie – production, composition, vocals
