= Junkee =

Australian pop-culture website (founded 2013)

- Type: Subsidiary
- Industry: Digital media, Publishing
- Founded: 2013; 13 years ago
- Headquarters: Surry Hills, New South Wales, Australia
- Owner: Junkee Media
- Website: junkeemedia.com

Junkee (also known as Junkee.com) is an Australian digital media platform operated by Junkee Media, focusing on youth culture, entertainment, and lifestyle content. It was launched in 2013, targeting 18- to 29-year-olds. It covers film, TV, music, politics, and social justice. In June 2024, Junkee underwent a major rebrand, introducing a new website and visual identity under the moniker "Junkee 2.0," emphasizing a social-first strategy to engage readers.
