= Sophie (musician) =

English music producer and DJ (1985–2021)

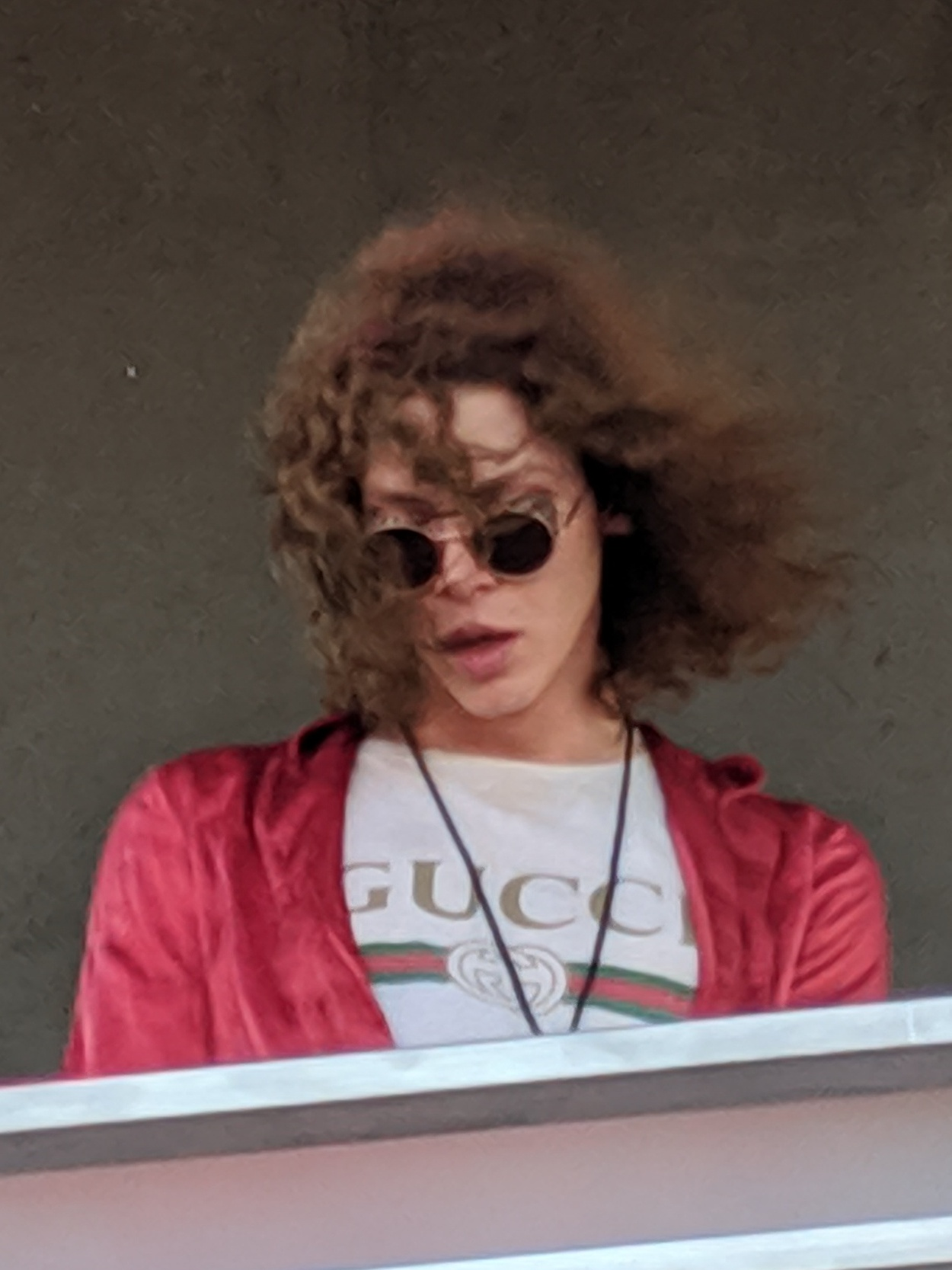
- Sophie performing at Yola Dia festival in 2019

Background information
- Also known as: Sophie Xeon
- Born: 17 September 1985; Northampton, England
- Died: 30 January 2021 (aged 35) Athens, Greece
- Genres: Electronic; avant-pop; hyperpop; experimental pop; deconstructed club; bubblegum bass
- Occupations: Music producer; DJ; singer; songwriter
- Instruments: Synthesiser; digital audio workstation; vocals
- Works: Discography
- Years active: 2008–2021
- Labels: Huntleys + Palmers; Numbers; MSMSMSM; Future Classic; Transgressive
- Formerly of: Motherland
- Partner: Evita Manji
- Website: msmsmsm.com

Sophie Xeon (/ˈziːɒn/ ZEE-on; 17 September 1985 – 30 January 2021), known as Sophie (stylised in all caps), was a British music producer, songwriter, and DJ. Her distinctive musical style incorporated experimental sound design, "sugary" synthesised textures, and underground dance elements. She helped pioneer the 2010s hyperpop and bubblegum bass genres.

Sophie rose to prominence with a string of breakthrough singles led by "Bipp" (2013); these were compiled on the singles collection Product (2015). She concealed her identity early in her solo career, but came out publicly as transgender in 2017. The following year, Sophie released the studio album Oil of Every Pearl's Un-Insides, earning a nomination for the Grammy Award for Best Dance/Electronic Album. She worked with artists from the PC Music label, including A. G. Cook and GFOTY, and produced acts such as Charli XCX, Vince Staples, Kim Petras, Madonna, Hyd, Itzy, Gaika, and Namie Amuro.

Sophie died in January 2021 after a fall in Athens, Greece. AllMusic eulogised her as a "fearless trailblazer in electronic music" who "bridged the mainstream and the avant-garde like few other artists", while Rolling Stone credited her with revolutionising underground pop and dance music. Her second album, Sophie, was almost complete at the time of her death; it was completed by her brother Benny Long and was released in 2024.

== Early life ==
Sophie was born in Northampton, England, and raised there before her family moved to London later in childhood. (Note: Sources commonly reported that Sophie and her family were Scottish (her father was born in Scotland) and that Sophie was instead born and raised in Glasgow. Other sources call Sophie British.) Sophie said in an interview published by Lenny Letter, "[My dad] had brilliant instincts, taking me to raves when I was very young. He bought me the rave Cassette tapes before I went to the events and would play them in the car and be like, 'This is going to be important for you.' [...] As soon as I'd heard electronic music, I spent all my time listening to those cassette tapes. I'd steal them from the car." Pet Shop Boys and the Prodigy were among her favourite acts. After receiving a keyboard as a birthday gift, she became interested in creating new music.

At the age of approximately nine or ten, Sophie expressed the desire to drop out of school to become an electronic music producer, but was not allowed to. She continued to create music throughout adolescence, regularly announcing "I'm just going to lock myself in my room until I've made an album." A half-sister asked Sophie to DJ her wedding; later she admitted that the half-sister "didn't know what I was doing in my room on my own" and had assumed she was a DJ. Around this time, Sophie learnt to DJ in addition to producing music.

== Career ==
=== Early years ===
Sophie's music career began in a band named Motherland, alongside bandmates Sabine Gottfried, Matthew Lutz-Kinoy, and Marcella Dvsi. She played live shows in Berlin and the UK during 2008–2009. She later collaborated with Lutz-Kinoy on a series of performance works.

In October 2010, Sophie remixed the Light Asylum single, "A Certain Person", creating the Motherland Radio version, uploaded to Light Asylum's SoundCloud page the following month. In 2011, this remix was included on Light Asylum's In Tension EP as a bonus track for the CD release. In 2012, this track was given a 300-copy release for club deejays on 12-inch, 45 rpm clear vinyl by independent label Mexican Summer.

In 2011, Sophie scored the short film Dear Mr/Mrs by Dutch team Freudenthal/Verhagen. Detroit deejay Jeffrey Sfire met Sophie in Berlin in 2013; the two formed the duo Sfire, releasing a 12-inch vinyl disc Sfire on the CockTail D'Amore label. She vocalised on one song "Sfire 3", which was later remixed by John Talabot in 2016.

Sophie became involved with artists affiliated with the PC Music label after encountering Dux Kidz, a project between A. G. Cook and Danny L Harle.

=== 2012–2015: First house music releases ===
"Bipp" (2013)
"Bipp" features a pitch-shifted vocal over a minimal rhythm that uses a flanging effect.

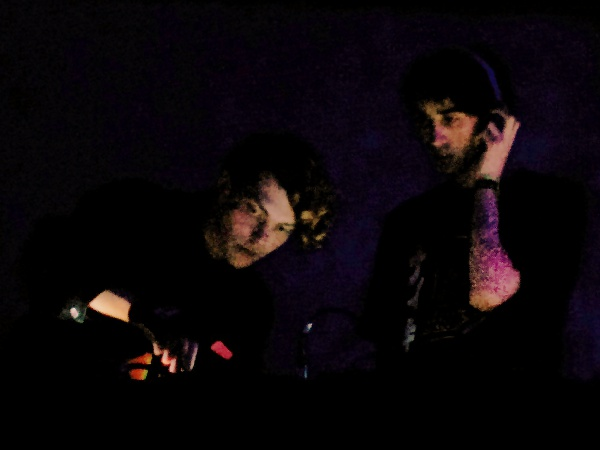
Sophie (left) produced "Hey QT" with A. G. Cook (right).

Sophie's debut single "Nothing More to Say" was released in February 2013 via the London-based Glaswegian label Huntleys + Palmers. The single, featuring vocals from UK singer Jaide Green, consisted of two mixes of the titular track (titled the "Dub" and "Vox"), as well as the B-side, "Eeehhh", which was initially posted on (and later deleted from) her SoundCloud in 2011.

Its follow-up, "Bipp"/"Elle"—which had been released on SoundCloud as previews in the previous year along with a third track "OOH"—was released on another Glasgow based label Numbers later that year. "Bipp" in particular, featuring vocals from Sophie's former Motherland bandmate Marcella Dvsi, received considerable attention from music critics, topping XLR8R's year-end list and placing 17 on Pitchfork's. Pitchfork later ranked "Bipp" 56 on its list of the best tracks from 2010 to 2014.

In mid-2014, Sophie collaborated with Japanese pop singer Kyary Pamyu Pamyu. Also in 2014, she collaborated with A. G. Cook and the US-based artist Hayden Dunham for the project QT, co-producing the single "Hey QT" with Cook. The project included a fictional energy drink called the QT Energy Elixir. At Sophie's request, "Hey QT" repeats the drink's name for product placement.

Sophie's next single, "Lemonade"/"Hard", was released in August 2014, with vocal contributions on the former from fellow musician Nabihah Iqbal and model Tess Yopp and vocal contributions on the latter from PC Music artist GFOTY. Numbers released "Lemonade"/"Hard" as a 12" single. Both tracks appeared on the Billboard Twitter Real-Time charts. "Lemonade" and "Hard" placed 68th and 91st respectively on the 2014 Pazz & Jop critics poll, and the single was included in the top ten of year-end singles lists by The Washington Post, Resident Advisor, Complex, and Pitchfork; "Hard" was included in the top ten on lists by Dazed and Dummy. "Lemonade" appeared in a 2015 commercial for McDonald's.

=== 2015–2017: Product and breakthrough ===
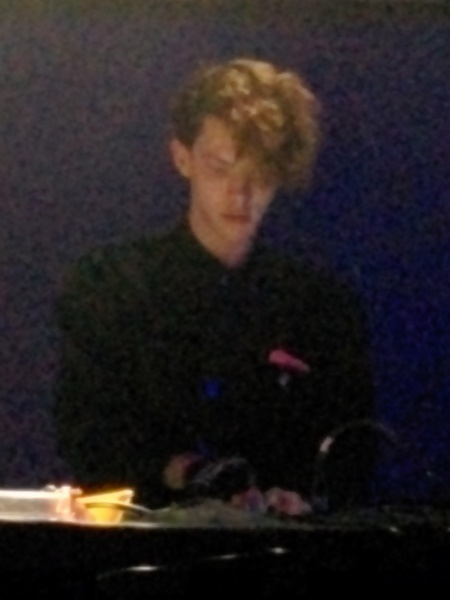
Sophie performing in 2015

In March 2015, Charli XCX announced a collaboration with Sophie. That same month, it was revealed that the pair had worked on multiple songs for XCX's upcoming studio album. In September 2015, Sophie's debut album Product was made available for preorder. The eight tracks listed were the four Numbers singles from 2013 and 2014, as well as four new tracks: "MSMSMSM", "Vyzee", "L.O.V.E.", and "Just Like We Never Said Goodbye". "MSMSMSM" was released on 29 September, and "Just Like We Never Said Goodbye" followed on 15 October.

In February 2016, Charli XCX released her Vroom Vroom EP, produced primarily by Sophie. It was later revealed that the EP would act as a teaser for XCX's upcoming album, which Sophie would produce. After the extended play's release, Sophie embarked on tour with Charli XCX to promotion new music. Sophie, along with A. G. Cook and Hannah Diamond also involved with the EP, received cameos in the official video for the lead single, "Vroom Vroom". The video was premiered on Apple Music and other platforms soon after.

In late 2016, Sophie acted as an additional producer on Charli XCX's song "After the Afterparty" and cameoed in the single's official music video. Sophie also received production credits for two songs on XCX's 2017 mixtape Number 1 Angel, and another for one song on XCX's second mixtape of 2017, Pop 2, released later that year.

Sophie collaborated with producer Cashmere Cat on several tracks from his album 9, including "Love Incredible" alongside Camila Cabello and "9 (After Coachella)" with MØ.

=== 2017–2021: Oil of Every Pearl's Un-Insides ===
In October 2017, Sophie released "It's Okay to Cry", her first new material in almost two years. The music video was the first time Sophie's voice and image were used in a release. She confirmed to the media that she was transgender. Later in the month, Sophie debuted in live performance, premiering newly recorded songs from her second album with vocal performances by Cecile Believe. The single "Ponyboy" was released with a self-directed music video on 7 December 2017. The third single from the album, "Faceshopping", was released on 16 February 2018 with a music video on 4 April 2018.

On 3 April 2018, Sophie announced via Instagram that the album was complete and that it would not be titled Whole New World as previously thought. On 1 May 2018, an interview with Crack Magazine revealed that the official album title is Oil of Every Pearl's Un-Insides. It was released on 15 June 2018 by Sophie's own label, MSMSMSM, along with Future Classic and Transgressive. The album prominently featured Sophie's own vocals. In early 2018, it was revealed in one of Sophie's tweets that she had contributed to and produced Lady Gaga's latest album. In a video posted on social media, when asked, Sophie said: "Yes. I mean whatever, you know. I work on a lot of different things. If it comes out, then it's cool. You can never tell. But she's a really cool person."

In July 2018, Sophie revealed work on four new projects, including a newly released debut album, which were all going to be released that year. Sophie said, "I have the next one finished... I'm going to release four albums this year". In an interview with Lenny Letter, Sophie said that she had done so much collaborating with other people that, "Basically, I've done a whole new album in the last two weeks." When asked to clarify whether this was a comment on EPs or albums, she stated that it would be "a mix". She had also been working with Kim Petras, Charli XCX, and Bibi Bourelly on new material within the year, as well as some rap collaborations in addition to the confirmed Lady Gaga collaboration.

At the 61st Annual Grammy Awards, Oil of Every Pearl's Un-Insides was nominated for Best Dance/Electronic Album, and Sophie made history as both one of the first openly transgender artists to be nominated in this category and one of the three first openly transgender women to be nominated for a Grammy. During a red carpet interview at the ceremony, she confirmed work on a remix album of Oil of Every Pearl's Un-Insides. In July 2019, Oil of Every Pearl's Un-Insides Non-Stop Remix Album was announced as part of an exclusive 3-CD set that included the original Oil of Every Pearl's Un-Insides album as well as a clutch bag featuring its artwork. The remix album was later released as two videos on YouTube on 29 July. Sophie featured on the September 2020 single "Metal" by Jimmy Edgar.

In January 2021, Numbers announced a new single release pairing a remix of "Bipp" by Autechre with the Product-era track "Unisil"; Sophie had previously stated that she wanted "NO remixes" of her music "unless it's Autechre" and called them "my heroes." The single was released two days before Sophie's death.

== Sound and image ==
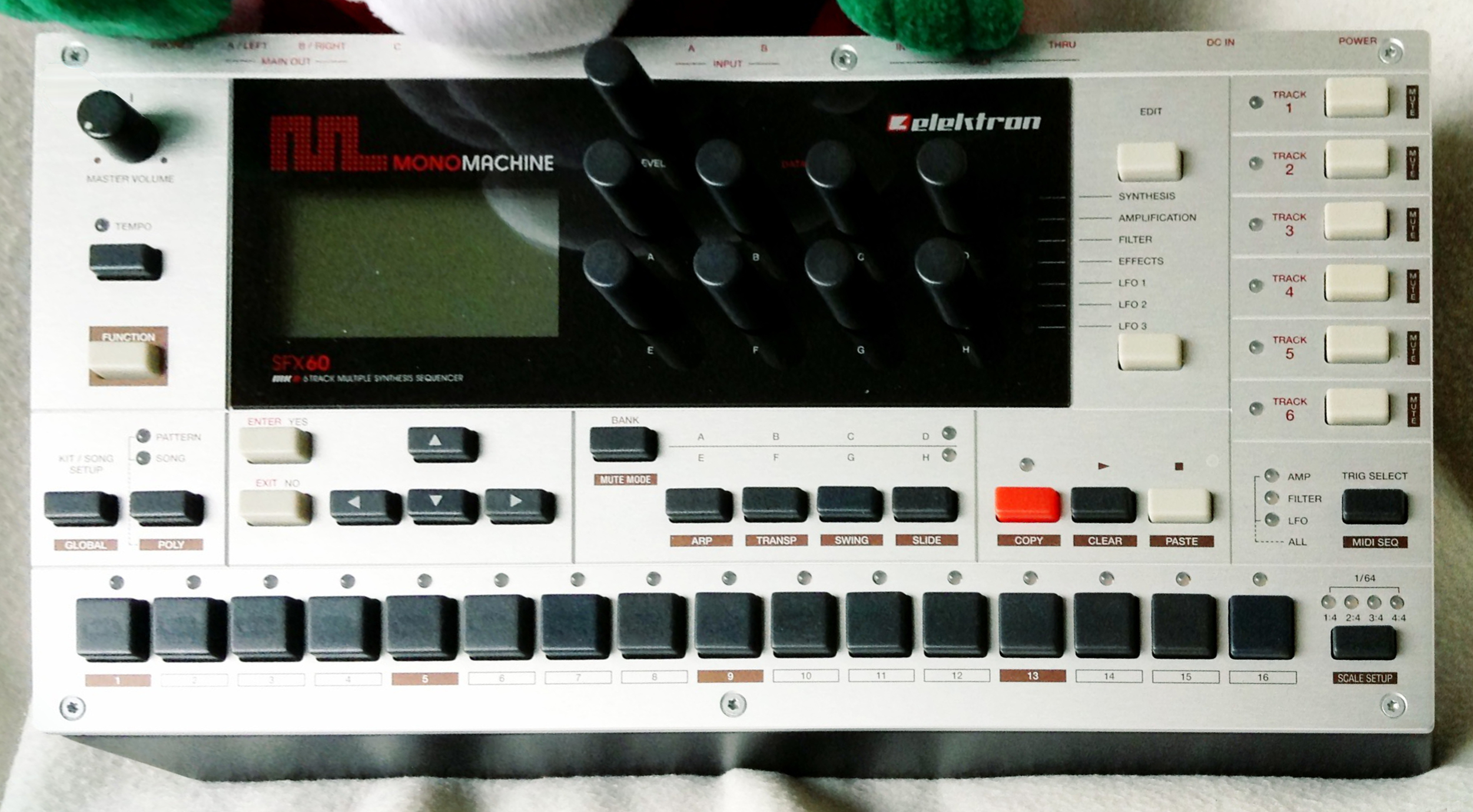
Sophie used the Elektron Monomachine synthesiser-sequencer to create sound textures from elementary waveforms.

AllMusic wrote that Sophie's "sophisticated, hyperkinetic productions" feature a "surrealist, blatantly artificial quality", typically making use of "sugary synthesiser textures, and beats drawing from underground dance music styles" as well as "experimental sound design" and feminine vocals. The Guardian likened her style to if "Aphex Twin had swallowed a 12-year-old girl's Spotify account. Playful, synthetic pop music – songs about love, or just as often, fizzy drinks – pared back to an austere digital minimalism; sounds so crisp and trickly, they sounded like CGI for the ears. And yet for all its foregrounded artifice, Sophie's work spoke of heartache and yearning; of human connection." The New York Times described Sophie's work as "giddy fun, but [...] also an invitation to consider pop's pleasures, structures and gender expectations, and pop's commercial status as both a consumer item and an emotional catalyst." Pitchfork credited her work with "mold[ing] electronic music into bracingly original avant-garde pop". Variety and The New York Times described her work as pioneering the 2010s style known as "hyperpop".

Sophie primarily used the Elektron Monomachine synth-sequencer and Ableton Live workstation to create music. Apart from vocals, Sophie created original synthesised sounds from the elementary waveforms by using the Monomachine, eschewing the use of samples. Likening the construction of a track to building a sculpture out of different materials, she synthesised sounds resembling "latex, balloons, bubbles, metal, plastic, [and] elastic". Tiny Mix Tapes described her production as "liquid metal or maybe the noise equivalent of non-Euclidean geometry". Sophie told Billboard that the genre of music she produced was "advertising".

Sophie's early visuals came from a series of colourful images described as "Homemade Molecular Cooking", with the singles' cover art often depicting objects made from plastic or other industrial materials, an idea that originated from discussions with John Roberts, a fellow electronic musician.

== Personal life ==
Sophie was described as a reclusive figure. Early in her career and prior to coming out as transgender, Sophie's real-life identity was the subject of press speculation. Her identity was concealed in interviews through voice masking, and by obscuring herself in press photos. At one Boiler Room show, drag performer Ben Woozy was recruited to mime a DJ set as Sophie while the artist posed as a bodyguard. Asked about the choice of Sophie as a stage name in a 2013 interview, she responded: "It tastes good and it's like moisturiser."

The music video for "It's Okay to Cry", released in October 2017, was the first time Sophie's voice and image were used in a solo release, with Sophie appearing nude from the bust up against a backdrop of clouds. This was widely interpreted as her coming out as transgender. Sophie confirmed a trans identity in subsequent interviews, also speaking of feeling boxed-in by labels and describing music as "my chosen method of communication" and self-expression.

== Death ==
On 30 January 2021, at the age of 35, Sophie fell three floors from the rooftop of a building in Athens, Greece while taking a picture of the full moon. She died at around 4:00 am. Sophie's partner, Evita Manji, said that "it took the police and fire brigade around 90 minutes to get her out" before their arrival at the hospital.

Artists including Rihanna, Sam Smith, Vince Staples, Charli XCX, A. G. Cook, Flume, Arca, Benny Blanco, Finneas, FKA Twigs, Jack Antonoff, Rahim Redcar and SLANDER expressed their condolences on different platforms.

== Legacy ==
In February 2021, a petition was launched on Change.org asking NASA to name the exoplanet TOI-1338 b in Sophie's honour, gaining over 95,000 signatures. Fans of Sophie noted that artist's impressions of the exoplanet released by NASA that year aesthetically resembled the cover art of Oil of Every Pearl's Un-Insides. Though the planet was not renamed, the International Astronomical Union announced on 16 June 2021 that the asteroid (10026) 1980 RE_{1} was given the permanent name Sophiexeon.

On 4 June 2021, Sophie's brother Benny Long announced plans to release some of her unreleased work. On 21 June 2024, a video was uploaded to Sophie's YouTube channel titled "@MSMSMSM_FOREVER", containing an hour and three seconds of silence and listing dates and times around 24 and 25 June in five different time zones. Three days later, it was announced that a posthumous self-titled album, produced by Sophie and Benny Long, would be released on 27 September via Transgressive and Future Classic. "Reason Why" featuring BC Kingdom and Kim Petras was officially released as a single. On 18 June 2025, Numbers rereleased her PRODUCT compilation as a 10 year anniversary including 2 new tracks "Get Higher" and "Ooh".

In March 2022, Charli XCX dedicated her album Crash to Sophie. Caroline Polachek's song "I Believe", which deals with ideas around immortality and legacy, is inspired by and dedicated to Sophie. "Sweetest Fruit", from St. Vincent's 2024 album All Born Screaming, opens with an ode to Sophie. Charli XCX's Brat (2024) also includes "So I", "a knotty exploration of her grief about Sophie". A. G. Cook's song "Without" expresses dealing with the loss of someone you love and interpolates Sophie's "Bipp" within the outro. At the 65th Annual Grammy Awards, Sophie's former collaborator Kim Petras became the first transgender artist to win the award for Best Pop Duo/Group Performance; during her acceptance speech, she credited Sophie for paving the way for her. While accepting her British Dance Act award at the Brit Awards 2025, Charli XCX mentioned Sophie in her speech, among other artists she had been influenced by, calling Sophie "someone who none of [them] would be [there] without".

On 17 September 2024, a Google Doodle commemorated what would have been Sophie's 38th birthday. An accompanying video uploaded to YouTube Shorts, titled "Celebrating Sophie Xeon", uses her track "Immaterial" from Oil of Every Pearl's Un-Insides. On 1 June 2025, a Google Doodle commemorated the hyperpop genre, in which it mentions Sophie.

== Discography ==
- Product (2015)
- Oil of Every Pearl's Un-Insides (2018)
- Sophie (2024)

== Awards and nominations ==
Award	Year	Nominees	Category	Result	Ref.
AIM Independent Music Awards	2018	Sophie	UK Breakthrough of the Year	Nominated	
AIM Independent Music Awards	2018	Sophie	Innovator Award	Won	
AIM Independent Music Awards	2018	Oil of Every Pearl's Un-Insides	Independent Album of the Year	Nominated	
AIM Independent Music Awards	2020	Oil of Every Pearl's Un-Insides Non-Stop Remix Album	Best Creative Packaging	Nominated	
AIM Independent Music Awards	2021	"Sweat" (Sophie Remix)	Best Independent Remix	Nominated	
Grammy Awards	2019	Oil of Every Pearl's Un-Insides	Best Dance/Electronic Album	Nominated	
Libera Award	2019	Oil of Every Pearl's Un-Insides	Best Dance/Electronic Album	Nominated	
Q Awards	2018	Sophie	Best Solo Artist	Nominated	
