= Oil of Every Pearl's Un-Insides =

Studio album by Sophie
- Released: 15 June 2018
- Studio: Soapworld
- Genres: Experimental pop; electronic; avant-pop; hyperpop
- Length: 39:55
- Labels: MSMSMSM; Future Classic; Transgressive
- Producer: Sophie

Sophie chronology
Product (2015)	Oil of Every Pearl's Un-Insides (2018)	Oil of Every Pearl's Un-Insides Non-Stop Remix Album (2019)

Singles from Oil of Every Pearl's Un-Insides
- 1. "It's Okay to Cry" Released: 23 October 2017; 2. "Ponyboy" Released: 8 December 2017; 3. "Faceshopping" Released: 16 February 2018

Oil of Every Pearl's Un-Insides (stylised in all caps) is the debut studio album by British electronic music producer Sophie and the only one to be released during her lifetime. It was released on 15 June 2018, through Transgressive, Future Classic and Sophie's own label, MSMSMSM. The title may be a mondegreen of the phrase "I love every person's insides". The album was Sophie's second full-length release after the singles collection Product (2015).

The album was met with widespread acclaim by critics and received a nomination for the Best Dance/Electronic Album at the 61st Annual Grammy Awards. Three promotional singles were released off the album: "It's Okay to Cry", "Ponyboy", and "Faceshopping". A remix album, Oil of Every Pearl's Un-Insides Non-Stop Remix Album, was released in July 2019.

== Background ==
The album's working title was Whole New World.

In an interview with Jezebel, Sophie stated that she "didn't really see a lot of value in the album as a musical statement. But the industry seems to find it very important. If I want to get my music heard, which I do, it’s kind of crystallized as an album." She also revealed her plans to release an accompanying "double remix" album, originally intended to include remixes made by her friends.

== Composition ==
Oil of Every Pearl's Un-Insides incorporates an eclectic array of genres and styles including avant-pop, industrial music, glitch music, electro, ambient, dance-pop, EDM, ambient house, industrial techno, drone, synth-pop, Eurodance, contemporary R&B, dream pop, trap, bubblegum pop, and musique concrete. (Note: Multiple references:) Singer Cecile Believe can be heard on all vocal tracks on the album except "Not Okay", which contains sampled vocals from Kota Banks.

=== Songs ===
The opening track "It's Okay to Cry" is a ballad that begins with Sophie softly and intimately singing with 1980s-style synthesizer arrangements, before the song intensifies and Sophie's vocals crescendo to a wail. It was Sophie's first song as a singer-songwriter, and its lyrics and music video were taken as Sophie publicly coming out as transgender. "Ponyboy" and "Faceshopping" are playfully aggressive and hyperactive tracks that make use of pitch shifting. "Ponyboy" contains references to BDSM, while "Faceshopping" alludes to themes of transgender identity and transhumanism.

== Promotion ==
The first single, "It's Okay to Cry", was released alongside a self-directed music video of Sophie, naked, singing directly to the camera in a studio setting behind digital skies and rainbow. The video marked Sophie's "first proper public appearance".

The second single, "Ponyboy", was released in December 2017. For its music video, Sophie worked with performance collective FlucT to choreograph "a dramatized ménage à trois". The third and final single, "Faceshopping", deals with gender, beauty, and the body and features vocals by Cecile Believe. Its accompanying music video distorts 3D renderings of Sophie's face, intercut with strobing images.

== Critical reception ==
Professional ratings
Aggregate scores
Source	Rating
AnyDecentMusic?	8.2/10
Metacritic	86/100
Review scores
Source	Rating
AllMusic	5/5 stars
Exclaim!	9/10
The Guardian	4/5 stars
NME	4/5 stars
Pitchfork	8.6/10
Q	4/5 stars
Rolling Stone	4/5 stars
The Times	3/5 stars
Tiny Mix Tapes	5/5 stars
Vice (Expert Witness)	A−

At Metacritic, which assigns a standard rating out of 100 to reviews from professional publications, Oil of Every Pearl's Un-Insides received an average score of 86, based on 22 reviews, indicating "universal acclaim".

Writing for Pitchfork, Sasha Geffen praised the album as "sprawling and beautiful, while still keeping the disorienting, latex-pop feel of her fascinating production technique" and said that while Sophie's "early singles exhibited a keen feel for economy and a killer sense of humor, OIL makes a bid for transcendent beauty." Peter Boulos of Exclaim! said, "For all the praise that could be heaped on the bulk of Sophie's output, the best that comes to mind is that it sounds like no one else could have made Oil of Every Pearl's Un-Insides. This is the kind of music that, in 20 years, we may look back on as a pivotal point in changing the trajectory of the pop music sound."

Reviewing the album for AllMusic, Heather Phares compared it favorably to Sophie's preceding release Product, claiming "Sophie is never indecisive as she takes her sounds and concepts to extremes. Where Product felt like a collection of alien pop hits, Oil of Every Pearl's Un-Insides abounds with interludes, passages, and major statements that allow her to dig deeper on the album's second half." Joe Rivers of Clash wrote, "Sophie manages to incorporate the personal without detracting from what set her apart in the first place, and it makes for a record that's as affecting as it is thrilling."

== Accolades ==
Year-end lists
Publication	Accolade	Rank	Ref.
Crack	The Top 50 Albums of 2018	1	
Dazed	The 20 Best Albums of 2018	3	
Drowned in Sound	15 Favourite Albums of 2018	3	
Fact	Best Albums of 2018	23	
Gorilla vs. Bear	Albums of 2018	16	
NME	Albums of the Year 2018	23	
Pazz & Jop	The Top 100 Albums of 2018	33	
Pitchfork	The 50 Best Albums of 2018	18	
PopMatters	75 Best Albums of 2018	13	
Robert Christgau	Dean's List 2018	30	
Spin	The 51 Best Albums Of 2018	47	
Stereogum	The 10 Best Electronic Albums of 2018	1	
The Guardian	The 50 Best Albums of 2018	11	
The Quietus	Albums of the Year 2018	28	
The Skinny	Top 50 Albums of 2018	11	
Tiny Mix Tapes	Favorite 50 Music Releases of 2018	1	
Uproxx	20 Must-Hear Pop Albums of 2018	19	

Decade-end lists
Publication	Accolade	Rank	Ref.
AllMusic	Decade in Review	-	
Crack	The Top 100 Albums of the Decade	6	
Mixmag	The 72 Best Albums of the Decade 2010–2019	-	
Noisey	The 100 Best Albums of the 2010s	60	
Pitchfork	The 200 Best Albums of the 2010s	74	

Awards
Ceremony	Category	Result	Ref.
61st Grammy Awards	Best Dance/Electronic Album	Nominated	

== Track listing ==
Oil of Every Pearl's Un-Insides track listing
No.	Title	Writer(s)	Length
1.	"It's Okay to Cry"	Sophie	3:51
2.	"Ponyboy"	Sophie; Cecile Believe	3:15
3.	"Faceshopping"	Sophie; Cecile Believe	3:57
4.	"Is It Cold in the Water?"	Sophie; Believe	3:32
5.	"Infatuation"	Sophie; Believe	4:40
6.	"Not Okay"	Sophie; Kota Banks^{a}	1:49
7.	"Pretending"	Sophie	5:53
8.	"Immaterial"	Sophie; Believe	3:53
9.	"Whole New World/Pretend World"	Sophie; Believe	9:06
Total length:			39:55

^aBanks was initially uncredited on the album. This has since been changed on most streaming platforms, due to the song containing prominent samples of her vocals from an unreleased collaboration with Sophie.

== Personnel ==
Music

- Sophie – lead vocals (1–3, 6 and 9), background vocals, processed vocals (7), production and mixing
- Cecile Believe – lead vocals (2–5, 8 and 9), background vocals (1), processed vocals (7)
- Noonie Bao – background vocals (track 9)
- Banoffee – background vocals (8)
- Nick Harwood – vocals^{b}
- Benjamin Long – mixing, vocal engineering, studio engineering
- Kota Banks – sampled vocals (6)

^bNick Harwood listed without specifying whether he performed background or lead vocals or which songs he appeared on.

Artwork

- Eric Wrenn – art direction
- Charlotte Wales – photography
- Julia Wagner – set design
- Coco Campbell – dress design
- Emily Schubert – design (dress design)
- B34 – design (textiles)
- Nick Harwood – creative direction
- Sophie – creative direction

== Charts ==
Chart performance for Oil of Every Pearl's Un-Insides
Chart (2018–2026)	Peak position
New Zealand Heatseeker Albums (RMNZ)	6
Scottish Albums (Official Charts)	61
UK Albums Sales (Official Charts)	71
UK Dance Albums (Official Charts)	2
UK Independent Albums (Official Charts)	20
US Heatseekers Albums (Billboard)	21
US Top Album Sales (Billboard)	35
US Top Dance Albums (Billboard)	15

== Release history ==
Release formats for Oil of Every Pearl's Un-Insides
Region	Date	Format	Label	Ref.
Various	15 June 2018	Digital download	Transgressive; Future Classic; MSMSMSM	
Various	21 December 2018	LP	Transgressive; Future Classic; MSMSMSM	
