= Gaika (musician) =

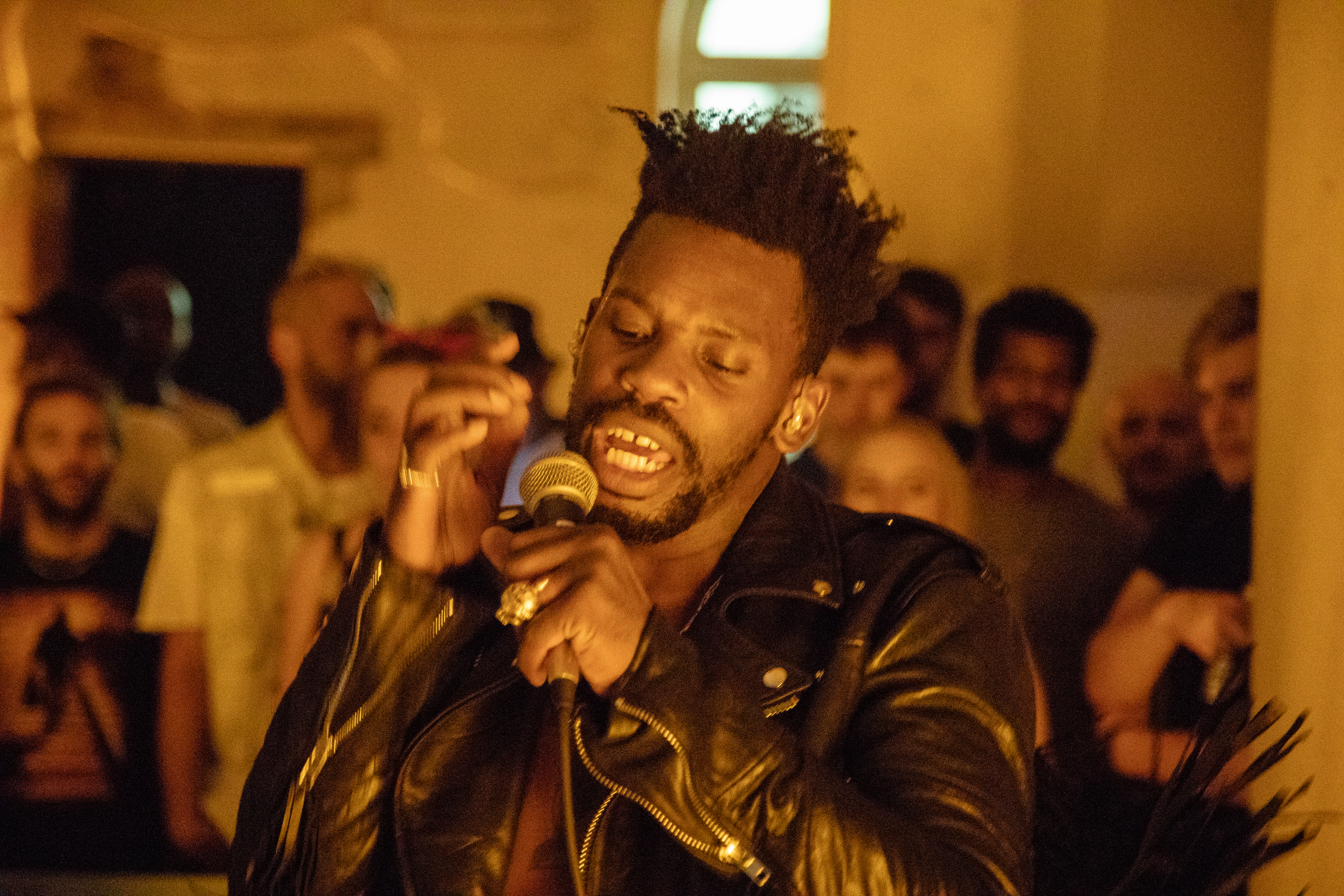
- Gaika at Somerset House, August 2018

Background information
- Born: Gaika Tavares Brixton, London, England
- Genres: Alternative R&B; progressive rap; dancehall; industrial
- Occupations: artist; filmmaker; musician
- Labels: Big Dada; N.A.A.F.I; Warp
- Website: gaika.works

Gaika Tavares, better known simply as Gaika, is an interdisciplinary artist and musician from South London. His debut album, Basic Volume, was released in July 2018 by Warp Records, His work is characterised by an experimental blend of Caribbean sound system culture, avant garde electronica and alternative rock

== Early life ==
Gaika's parents came from Grenada and Jamaica, moving to the UK in the 1960s. He was previously a part of Manchester rap crew Murkage.

== Music career ==
Following the mixtapes Machine and Security, Gaika released the EP Spaghetto in 2016. The Guardian described his music as blending "Caribbean dancehall tradition and London grime but also nod to R&B, trip-hop, grunge and Prince." Dazed have described him as "electronic music's answer to Basquiat", while US magazine Interview described the sound as "experimental R&B".

Gaika's debut album Basic Volume was released in July 2018. The Guardian praised the album as "a terrifically impressive and populist debut". The album also received positive reviews from the Financial Times, The Independent, Noisey and Music OMH.

In May 2019, Gaika released a mixtape named Heaters 4 the 2 Seaters by Warp Records, and in July 2020 he released club focused Seguridad EP on Mexican record label N.A.A.F.I.

In April 2022 he released the followup War Island OST in collaboration with his own Label and N.A.A.F.I

In 2023 he released his sophomore album Drift on Big Dada , again to high critical acclaim. publications widely praised his shift from industrial electronics to a raw live band aesthetic, disrupting preconceptions. Pitchfork highlighted the records departure from industry convention that successfully "captures the energy of band playing together in real time". The album generated positive reviews across the industry with a number of critics calling it a "piece of work whose impact will last far into the future "

In February 2024, his experimental art rock project Pretty Hands with classical composer Paloma León, released the EP Dogtown. The duo performed the EP live at Not Crowded, a "contemporary and experimental event series", at Rich Mix in Shoreditch.

In October 2026 he released the previously unlisted rap Mixtape GKZ vol1: Apex GT and the new album TYRIAN on his own label under a new collaborative moniker Hinomura LTD.

Alongside his album releases, Gaika has worked extensively as a composer and sound designer for film, television, fashion and contemporary dance. He composed original ballet scores for both the Wayne Mcgregor Company and Ballet Rambert and contemporary choreographers such as Marion Motin. In television he remade and remixed the main theme song for the BBC adaptation of Mallory Blackman's Noughts and Crosses and appeared as an additional composers for second season. In 2020 he collaborated with Liberato and 3D on the song We Come from Napoli, soundtrack of the movie Ultras by Francesco Lettieri.s. He has composed scores and provided music for many art films notably collaborating with Grace Ndritu's work "Becoming Plant" (2022) and Sin Wai Kin's "The story Cycle" (2023). He has composed Fashion shows for Saul Nash, Liam Hodges, Olubiyi Thomas, Luke Menikmati and scored commercials for Jordan Brand, Royal Enfield Apparel, Nike, Adidas and Converse. .

== Visual Art and Installations ==
In addition to his musical career , Gaika has maintained a prominent multimedia and visual arts practise focused on industrial engineering, graphic design, sound system culture, techno existential themes and post colonial futurism.

In August 2018, Gaika exhibited System, a collaboration with Boiler Room and Somerset House Studios, "a sculpture which fills the middle portion of the Lancaster Room at Somerset House." He told the Evening Standard that "Carnival and sound system culture is about space, and holding space. It’s about literally drawing a line in the sand and saying: ‘This is who we are and we’re here to stay. You can’t turn us off’."

The following year he returned to the venue for the landmark exhibition Get Up Stand Up Now (2019) contributing a scaffold and chain video installation that served as the physical manifestation of the mixtape Heaters 4 the 2 Seaters. In 2021 Gaika Collaborated with influential American artist Torkwase Dyson on her Pace Live performance and sculptural installations, providing the primary sound compositions for I Can Drink The Distance at Pace gallery New York and Liquid A Pace at Pace London. the latter partnership resulted in a 2021 limited edition -split dub-plate vinyl released by Pace publishing featuring his track "Marchioness"

Gaika was selected to present a new work for the ninth edition of the British Art Show Nine (BAS9) touring exhibition from 2021 to 2022, where he exhibited Zemel - a minimalist audio visual shrine paying tribute to Windrush Generation deportees. Gaika has also frequently collaborated with artist Ben Cullen Williams on works exploring urban geography and generification. These include Routine (2021) in London's design District, Lagan (2022) in Sicily, Italy and Mass (2023) at Staffordshire Street Gallery in South London. In 2022 he co-founded the multi installation project Nine Nights : Channel B at London's Institute of Contemporary Art. In the same year he contributed Convo 2.2 Complex confessional - an installation featuring and critiquing an early GPT-3 artificial intelligence interface- to the Futrueshock exhibition at 180 Strand. In 2023, in collaboration with his brothers Kibwe Tavares and Zenna Tavares, he exhibited the immersive story telling work DJALI at the 18th Venice Biennale of Architecture.

Operating a standalone practise through Studio GKZ Gaika's recent commercial projects have an automotive bent and includes motorcycle design in collaboration with Royal Enfield for movie The Kitchen (2023), and the speculative installation Island Racing (2025) commissioned for the Fashioning Frequencies exhibition and London College of Fashion.

== Discography ==
=== Studio albums ===
- Basic Volume (2018)
- War Island OST (2022)
- Drift (2023)
- TYRIAN (2026)

=== EPs ===
- Spaghetto (2016)
- Spectacular Empire I (2016)
- Spectacular Empire II (2017)
- Seguridad (2020)

=== Mixtapes ===
- Machine (2015)
- Security (2016)
- Heaters 4 the 2 Seaters (2019)
- GKZ vol 1 : Apex GT (2024)

=== Singles ===
- "The Deal" (2016)
- "Smoke Break" (2017)
- "Crown & Key" (2017)
- "Immigrant Sons" (2018)
- "Seven Churches for St Jude" (2019)
