= Cecile Believe =

Canadian musician (born 1985)

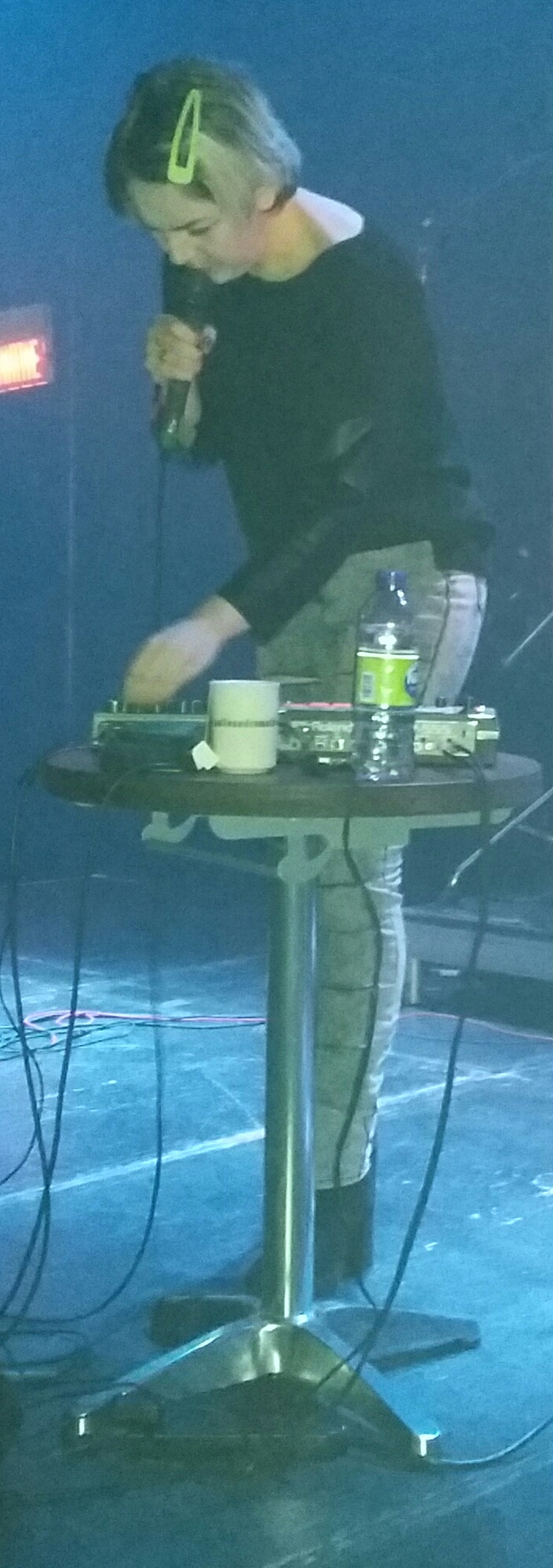
- Cecile Believe at a concert in 2015

Background information
- Born: Caila Thompson-Hannant; February 15, 1985 (age 41)
- Origin: Montreal, Quebec, Canada
- Genres: Synth-pop; dream pop; electropop; art pop; electronic
- Occupations: Singer, songwriter, producer
- Instruments: Vocals; guitar; keyboards
- Years active: 2005-present
- Labels: Arbutus; Asthmatic Kitty

Caila Thompson-Hannant (born February 14, 1985), known professionally as Cecile Believe (formerly known as Mozart's Sister) is a Canadian singer, songwriter, and music producer. Originally starting her music career in the band Shapes and Sizes, Thompson-Hannant started her solo career with her EPs Dear Fear (2011) and Hello (2013), and later her albums Being (2014) and Field of Love (2017), at the time being under the stage name Mozart's Sister. She began getting involved with the label and art collective PC Music, with early collaborations with Kane West, later gaining recognition for collaborations with music producer Sophie.

Thompson-Hannant has consistently worked with other artists, being involved with projects from A. G. Cook, Hannah Diamond, Oklou, Kero Kero Bonito, and Steve Lacy.

== Biography ==
Thompson-Hannant's musical beginnings are much accredited to the electropop introduced to her by her uncle. She went on to play guitar & synthesizer in the band Shapes & Sizes, which was on the Asthmatic Kitty label. She was also a member of Montreal-based bands Miracle Fortress and Think About Life.

Thompson-Hannant independently released her first EP, Dear Fear, in 2011 through Bandcamp. For the two years following this release, she garnered press attention through playing festivals such as SXSW and Pop Montreal. In February 2013, she released her second EP, Hello, through Merok Records. In June 2014, she announced a new album, titled Being, for release on August 5 of that year and released the single "Enjoy". She thereafter released her second album, Field of Love, on February 17, 2017.

In 2017, she became associated with works tied to the record label and art collective, PC Music, starting with vocal work on Gus Lobban's side project, Kane West for the song "Definitely Come Together", and Kero Kero Bonito's EP, TOTEP. In 2018, she gained recognition for her vocal work on Sophie's debut studio album, Oil of Every Pearl's Un-Insides, which was later nominated for Grammy Award for Best Dance/Electronic Album at the 61st Annual Grammy Awards. She was also credited as a co-writer for the remix album, Oil of Every Pearl's Un-Insides Non-Stop Remix Album.

On February 18, 2020, Thompson-Hannant released her first solo single under the Cecile Believe moniker, titled "Last Thing He Said To Me In Person", accompanied by its music video and a pre-order of her album Made In Heaven on which it appears. Her second single, titled "Pick Up the Phone", was released on April 8, 2020, along with a music video that was released a day before the official release. Her debut album Made In Heaven was officially released a month later on May 8, 2020. The album was completely written, produced and performed by herself.

On November 20, 2020, she released her mixtape, Plucking a Cherry from the Void, which included the single, "Times", that was officially released prior on November 12, 2020, along with a visualizer video the same day. The mixtape features additional production from PC Music founder A. G. Cook on two tracks ("Crickets" and "Living My Life Over (Extreme Vocal Edit)"). Thompson-Hannant also appeared on Cook's 7G album in 2020.

In 2021, Thompson-Hannant was revealed to be working on an album by Ssion. She worked with other artists such as Shygirl, Hannah Diamond, Dorian Electra, among others on their respective projects, and remixed tracks by caro♡, Magdalena Bay, and Say Lou Lou throughout 2022 and 2023.

in 2024, she released her EP, Tender the Spark, being released under the label ambient tweets. She appeared on Britpop (2024) by A. G. Cook as a vocalist, and also being featured on Sophie's posthumous album on "My Forever".

== Discography ==
=== As Cecile Believe ===
==== EPs ====
- Made in Heaven (Self-released, 2020)
- Tender the Spark (ambient tweets, 2024)

==== Mixtapes ====
- Plucking a Cherry from the Void (Self-released, 2020)

=== As Mozart's Sister ===
==== EPs ====
- Dear Fear (Self-released, 2011)
- Hello (Merok, 2013)

==== Albums ====
- Being (Asthmatic Kitty, 2014)
- Field of Love (Arbutus, 2017)

=== Remixes ===
- Dizzy – "Heavy (Cecile Believe Remix)" (2019)
- Homeshake – "Another Thing (Cecile Believe Mix)" (2019)
- Tops – "Colder & Closer (Cecile Believe Remix)" (2020)
- caro♡ – "heart in 2 (Cecile Believe Remix)" (2021)
- Owlle – "Le goût de la fête (Cecile Believe Remix)" (2022)
- Magdalena Bay – "Something for 2 (Cecile Believe Remix)" (2022)
- Regularfantasy – "So Sweet (Cecile Believe's Pixie Mix)" (2022)
- Say Lou Lou – "Waiting for a Boy (Cecile Believe Remix)" (2023)
- Emma Beko – "lookinforu (Cecile Believe Remix)" (2023)

=== Other appearances ===
Title	Year	Artist(s)	Album	Credits	Additional notes
"Definitely Come Together"	2017	Kane West	Non-album single	Un-credited vocalist	—N/a
"Cutlass Cruiser"	2017	TOPS	Sugar at the Gate	Backing vocalist	—N/a
"I Just Wanna Make You Real"	2017	TOPS	Sugar at the Gate	Backing vocalist	—N/a
—N/a	2018	Kero Kero Bonito	TOTEP	Backing vocalist	Credited as Caila; as part of "The Parakeets"
—N/a	2018	Sophie	Oil of Every Pearl's Un-Insides	Vocalist, co-writer	—N/a
—N/a	2018	Kero Kero Bonito	Time 'n' Place	Backing vocalist	Credited as Caila; as part of "The Parakeets"
"One More Night"	2019	Slaters	Non-album singles	Featured artist, co-writer	Credited as "Cece B"
"Yes Exactly"	2020	Kane West & Thomas Van Party	Non-album singles	Featured artist, co-writer	—N/a
"Mountain Baby"	2020	Austra	Hirudin	Featured artist, co-writer	—N/a
"Anywayz"	2020	Austra	Hirudin	Co-writer	—N/a
"Show Me What"	2020	A. G. Cook	7G	Featured artist	—N/a
"Wish I Could Fall in Love"	2021	DAGR	DAGR	Featured artist, co-writer	—N/a
"Cerise"	2021	—N/a	Mutants Vol. 5: Free	Lead artist	Compilation track, Bandcamp exclusive
"Shots Fired"	2021	Namasenda	Unlimited Ammo	Co-writer	—N/a
"2 AM (Real Love)"	2021	Teen Daze	Interior	Featured artist, co-writer	—N/a
"Olivia"	2022	Tiberius B	Non-album single	Co-writer, co-producer	—N/a
"honest"	2022	Umru	Comfort Noise	Featured artist, co-writer	—N/a
"Theme for Flight"	2022	—N/a	For the Birds: The Birdsong Project, Vol. II	Lead artist	Compilation track
"Firefly"	2022	Shygirl	Nymph	Additional vocals, co-writer, additional production	—N/a
"Juicy Fruit"	2023	Brooke Candy	Non-album single	Backing vocals, co-writer, co-producer	—N/a
"I Got a Bike"	2023	Casey MQ	Two Songs (Live)	Featured artist, co-writer	—N/a
"Idolize"	2023	Dorian Electra	Fanfare	Co-writer, co-producer	—N/a
"Manmade Horrors"	2023	Dorian Electra	Fanfare	Co-writer, co-producer	—N/a
"Lifetime"	2023	Dorian Electra	Fanfare	Co-writer, co-producer	—N/a
"No FX"	2023	Hannah Diamond	Perfect Picture	Co-writer	—N/a
"Lip Sync"	2023	Hannah Diamond	Perfect Picture	Co-writer	—N/a
"Twisted"	2023	Hannah Diamond	Perfect Picture	Co-writer	—N/a
"Divisible by Two"	2023	Hannah Diamond	Perfect Picture	Co-writer	—N/a
"Dang"	2023	Caroline Polachek	Desire, I Want To Turn Into You: Everasking Edition	Co-writer, co-producer	—N/a
"Run" (feat. Cecile Believe)	2024	TR/ST	TR/ST EP	Featured artist, co-writer, co-producer	—N/a
"Me, I Think I Found It"	2024	Casey MQ	Later that day, the day before, or the day before that	Co-writer, co-producer	—N/a
"The Make Believe" (feat. Oklou)	2024	Casey MQ	Later that day, the day before, or the day before that	Co-writer, co-producer	—N/a
"Sucia"	2024	Empress Of	For Your Consideration	Co-writer	—N/a
"Elk Skin"	2024	Sega Bodega	Dennis	Additional vocals, co-writer	—N/a
"Blue Screen"	2024	Cadence Weapon	Rollercoaster	Featured artist	—N/a
"Silver Thread Golden Needle"	2024	A. G. Cook	Britpop	Vocals	—N/a
"Prismatic"	2024	A. G. Cook	Britpop	Vocals	—N/a
"system"	2024	salute	True Magic	Additional vocals, co-writer	—N/a
"Drive"	2024	Miss Madeline	So Dramatic	Co-writer, co-producer, programming	—N/a
"Dark Day"	2024	TR/ST	Performance	Co-producer	—N/a
"Warp"	2024	TR/ST	Performance	Co-producer	—N/a
"My Forever" (feat. Cecile Believe)	2024	Sophie	Sophie	Featured artist, co-writer	—N/a
"Eurostar"	2024	Nemo	TBA	Co-producer	—N/a
"Believe"	2024	Yunè Pinku	Scarlet Lamb	Co-writer, co-producer, programming	—N/a
"Angel Tattoo"	2024	Brooke Candy	Spiral	Co-writer, co-producer	—N/a
"Is There Anyone Out There?"	2024	Betta Lemme	TBA	Co-writer	—N/a
"Rare Baby"	2024	KUKII	TBA	Co-writer, co-producer	—N/a
"Thank You for Recording"	2025	Oklou	Choke Enough	Co-writer	—N/a
"Family and Friends"	2025	Oklou	Choke Enough	Vocal choir	—N/a
"Obvious"	2025	Oklou	Choke Enough	Co-writer	—N/a
"Take Me by the Hand" (feat. Bladee)	2025	Oklou	Choke Enough	Co-writer	—N/a
"Lovesexdrugbomb" (feat. Cecile Believe)	2026	Steve Lacy	Oh Yeah?	Featured artist, co-writer	—N/a
"More"	2026	Illit	Break Even	Co-writer	—N/a
"Glow Motion"	2026	Ive	Looks Can Kill	Co-writer, co-producer	—N/a
