= Arca discography =

- Studio albums: 9
- EPs: 5
- Compilation albums: 1
- Singles: 29
- Music videos: 25
- Mixtapes: 3
- DJ mixes: 5
- Remixes: 15
- Remix albums: 1
- Box sets: 1

Venezuelan electronic music producer Arca has released eleven studio albums (including two under the name Nuuro), one remix album, four mixtapes, one compilation album, five DJ mixes, one box set, five extended plays (EPs), twenty-nine singles, twenty-three music videos, and twelve remixes.

== Albums ==
=== Studio albums ===
Title	Album details	Peak chart positions									
Title	Album details	BEL	JPN	SPA	UK Dance	UK DL	UK Indie	US Curr.	US Dance	US Heat	US Indie
Xen	Released: 3 November 2014; Label: Mute; Formats: CD, LP, digital download	—	109	—	17	—	— (Note: Xen did not enter the UK Independent Albums Chart, but peaked at number 13 on the Independent Album Breakers chart.)	—	8	6	47
Mutant	Released: 20 November 2015; Label: Mute; Formats: CD, LP, digital download	—	109	—	30	—	— (Note: Mutant did not enter the UK Independent Albums Chart, but peaked at number 19 on the Independent Album Breakers chart.)	—	9	20	—
Arca	Released: 7 April 2017; Label: XL; Formats: CD, LP, digital download	46	181	87	10	83	22	—	—	18	50
Kick I	Released: 26 June 2020; Label: XL; Formats: CD, LP, digital download	—	141	—	8	—	—	—	—	—	—
Kick II	Released: 30 November 2021; Label: XL; Formats: CD, LP, digital download	—	—	—	—	—	— (Note: Kick II did not enter the UK Independent Albums Chart, but peaked at number 16 on the Independent Album Breakers chart.)	83	—	—	—
Kick III	Released: 1 December 2021; Label: XL; Formats: CD, LP, digital download	—	—	—	—	—	— (Note: Kick III did not enter the UK Independent Albums Chart, but peaked at number 14 on the Independent Album Breakers chart.)	80	—	—	—
Kick IIII	Released: 2 December 2021; Label: XL; Formats: CD, LP, digital download	—	—	—	—	—	—	—	—	—	—
Kick IIIII	Released: 3 December 2021; Label: XL; Formats: CD, LP, digital download	—	—	—	—	—	—	—	—	—	—
XXXXX	Released: 31 July 2026; Label: XL; Formats: LP, digital download	—	—	—	—	—	—	—	—	—	—

=== Remix albums ===
Title	Album details
Riquiquí;Bronze-Instances(1-100)	Released: 16 December 2020; Label: XL; Formats: Digital download

=== Mixtapes ===
Title	Album details	Peak chart positions
Title	Album details	UK Indie Break.
&&&&&	Released: 23 July 2013; Label: self-released, Hippos in Tanks, PAN; Formats: LP, digital download	19
Sheep	Released: 13 January 2015; Label: self-released; Formats: digital download	
Entrañas	Released: 4 July 2016; Label: self-released; Format: digital download	
@@@@@	Released: 19 February 2020; Label: XL Recordings; Format: LP, digital download	

=== Compilation albums ===
Title	Album details
Kick	Released: 9 December 2022; Label: XL; Formats: Digital download

=== DJ mixes ===
Title	Album details
Baron Foyel	Released: 6 October 2011; Label: DIS Magazine; Format: digital download
Fader/MoMA PS1 Warm Up Mix	Released: 5 May 2012; Label: Fader Label; Format: digital download
@@@@@	Released: 21 February 2020; Label: XL; Format: digital download
^^^^^ (Circumflex)	Released: 8 April 2020 (Twitch Premiere); Released: 2 May 2020 (NTS Radio Premiere); Label: Self-Released; Format: Radio Broadcast
Airdoll	Released: 17 July 2026; Label: Self-Released; Format: Radio Broadcast

=== Box sets ===
Title	Album details
Kick	Released: 20 May 2022; Label: XL; Formats: 5xLP

== Extended plays ==
Title	Album details
Baron Libre	Released: 1 February 2012; Label: UNO NYC; Formats: digital download
Stretch 1	Released: 19 April 2012; Label: UNO NYC; Formats: digital download
Stretch 2	Released: 6 August 2012; Label: UNO NYC; Formats: CD, LP, digital download
Madre	Released: 22 January 2021; Label: XL; Formats: digital download
Issued by Bottega	Released: 24 June 2021; Label: Bottega Veneta; Format: Digital (exclusive to Bottega Veneta’s digital journal)

== Singles ==
Title	Year	Peak chart positions	Album
Title	Year	US Dance	Album
"Thievery"	2014	—	Xen
"Now You Know"	2014	—	Xen
"Xen"	2014	—	Xen
"Wound" / "Sad Bitch"	2015	—	Xen
"Vanity"	2015	—	Mutant
"Soichiro"	2015	—	Mutant
"EN"	2015	—	Mutant
"Front Load"	2015	—	Mutant
"Monstruosidad"	2015	—	Non-album single
"Sin Rumbo"	2016	—	Entrañas
"Piel"	2017	—	Arca
"Anoche"	2017	—	Arca
"Reverie"	2017	—	Arca
"Saunter"	2017	—	Arca
"Desafío"	2017	—	Arca
"@@@@@"	2020	—	Non-album single
"Nonbinary"	2020	—	Kick I
"Time"	2020	—	Kick I
"Mequetrefe"	2020	—	Kick I
"KLK" (featuring Rosalía)	2020	—	Kick I
"Madre" (featuring Oliver Coates)	2021	—	Madre
"Incendio"	2021	—	Kick III
"Born Yesterday" (featuring Sia)	2021	18	Kick II
"Prada" / "Rakata"	2021	—	Kick II
"Electra Rex"	2021	—	Kick III
"Queer" (featuring Planningtorock)	2021	—	Kick IIII
"Cayó"	2022	—	Kick
"El Alma Que Te Trajo" (with Safety Trance)	2022	—	Noches de Terror and Kick
"Яitual"	2023	—	Kick
"Sola" / "Puta"	2025	—	Non-album single

== Guest appearances ==
Title	Year	Other artist(s)	Album
"Meditation"	2016	Babyfather	"BBF" Hosted by DJ Escrow
"Deep"	2016	Babyfather	"BBF" Hosted by DJ Escrow
"Snm"	2016	Babyfather	"BBF" Hosted by DJ Escrow
"Take It Back"	2019	Blood Orange, Joba, Justine Skye	Angel's Pulse
"Love & Basketball 2"	2020	Dean Blunt	Roaches 2012-2019 (Super Deluxe)
"Vanessa Casas"	2020	Dean Blunt	Roaches 2012-2019 (Super Deluxe)
"Unconditional"	2020	Shygirl	Nymph_o
"Amantes"	2020	—N/a	Mutants Vol. 1: 1312
"Mallorca"	2020	—N/a	Mutants Vol. 2: Riot
"Shifting"	2020	Oneohtrix Point Never	Magic Oneohtrix Point Never
"Skullqueen"	2020	—N/a	Mutants Vol. 3: Seeds
"Yo Si (Alma)"	2021	—N/a	Mutants Vol. 4: Love
"Transients in the Render"	2021	Oliver Coates	—N/a
"Risueño"	2021	—N/a	Mutants Vol. 5: Free
"Cicada"	2021	Sega Bodega	Romeo
"Birth"	2022	—N/a	Mutants Vol. 6: Home
"Pasiempre"	2023	Tainy, Arcángel, Jhayco, Myke Towers, Omar Courtz, Bad Bunny	Data
"Arcamarine"	2024	Addison Rae	Non-album song

== Credits ==
Title	Year	Artist(s)	Album	Credit(s)	Writer(s)	Producer(s)
"The Redeemer"	2013	Dean Blunt, Inga Copeland	The Redeemer	Production	Dean Blunt	Dean Blunt, Arca
"New Slaves"	2013	Kanye West	Yeezus	Additional programming	Kanye West, Christopher Breaux, Cydel Young, Ben Bronfman, Malik Jones, Che Smith, Elon Rutberg, Sakiya Sandifer, Louis Johnson, Mike Dean, Gábor Presser, Anna Admis	Kanye West, Ben Bronfman (co), Mike Dean (add.), Travis Scott (add.), Noah Goldstein (add.), Shama Joseph (add.), Che Pope (add.)
"Hold My Liquor"	2013	Kanye West	Yeezus	Additional production, writing	Kanye West, Mike Dean, Justin Vernon, Keith Cozart, Elon Rutberg, Sakiya Sandifer, Malik Jones, Ghersi, Cydel Young, Derek Watkins	Mike Dean, Kanye West, Arca (add.), Noah Goldstein (add.)
"I'm in It"	2013	Kanye West	Yeezus	Additional production	Kanye West, Justin Vernon, Jeffery Ethan Campbell, Josh Leary, Malik Jones, Cydel Young, Sakiya Sandifer, Elon Rutberg, Mike Dean, Andre Harris, Jill Scott, Vidal Davis, Carvin Haggins, Kenny Lattimore	Kanye West, Evian Christ (co), Dom Solo (co), Noah Goldstein (add.), Arca (add.), Mike Dean (add.)
"Blood on the Leaves"	2013	Kanye West	Yeezus	Additional production	Kanye West, Ross Birchard, Elon Rutberg, Malik Jones, Tony Williams, Cydel Young, Mike Dean, Lewis Allen	Kanye West, Hudson Mohawke, Lunice, Carlos Broady (co), 88-Keys (add.), Mike Dean (add.), Arca (add.)
"Send It Up"	2013	Kanye West	Yeezus	Additional production, writing	Kanye West, Louis Johnson, Guy-Manuel de Homem-Christo, Thomas Bangalter, Mike Lévy, Sakiya Sandifer, Ab Liva, Elon Rutberg, Mike Dean, Moses Davis, Colin York, Lowell Dunbar	Kanye West, Daft Punk, Gesaffelstein (co), Brodinski (co), Arca (add.), Mike Dean (add.)
"How's That"	2013	FKA twigs	EP2	Production, writing	FKA twigs, Arca	Arca
"Papi Pacify"	2013	FKA twigs	EP2	Production, writing	FKA twigs, Arca	FKA twigs, Arca
"Water Me"	2013	FKA twigs	EP2	Production, vocal production, writing	FKA twigs, Arca	FKA twigs, Arca
"Ultraviolet"	2013	FKA twigs	EP2	Production, vocal production, writing	FKA twigs, Arca	Arca
"Lights On"	2014	FKA twigs	LP1	Production, writing, additional vocals	FKA twigs, Arca, Tic	Arca
"Two Weeks"	2014	FKA twigs	LP1	Additional programming, synth	FKA twigs, Emile Haynie	Emile Haynie, FKA twigs (add.)
"Hours"	2014	FKA twigs	LP1	Production, writing, additional programming, instruments,	FKA twigs, Emile Haynie, Devonté Hynes, Michael Volpe, Arca	Emile Haynie, Devonté Hynes, Clams Casino, Arca
"Give Up"	2014	FKA twigs	LP1	Additional production, additional sounds, programming	FKA twigs, Emile Haynie	Emile Haynie, Arca (add.)
"Lionsong"	2015	Björk	Vulnicura	Production, programming	Björk	Björk, Arca
"History of Touches"	2015	Björk	Vulnicura	Production, programming	Björk	Björk, Arca
"Black Lake"	2015	Björk	Vulnicura	Production, programming	Björk	Björk, Arca
"Family"	2015	Björk	Vulnicura	Production, programming, composition	Björk, Arca	Björk, The Haxan Cloak, Arca
"Notget"	2015	Björk	Vulnicura	Production, programming, composition	Björk, Arca	Björk, Arca
"Atom Dance"	2015	Björk, Anohni	Vulnicura	Production, programming	Björk, Oddný Eir Ævarsdóttir	Björk, Arca
"Mouth Mantra"	2015	Björk	Vulnicura	Production, programming	Björk	Björk, Arca
"A Message"	2015	Kelela	Hallucinogen	Production, writing, mixing, recording	Kelela Mizanekristos, Ghersi, Mocky Salole, Boots	Arca
"Hallucinogen"	2015	Kelela	Hallucinogen	Production, writing, mixing	Kelela Mizanekristos, Ghersi	Arca
"Meditation"	2016	Babyfather	BBF hosted by DJ Escrow	Featured artist, production, writing	Babyfather, Arca	Babyfather, Arca
"Deep"	2016	Babyfather	BBF hosted by DJ Escrow	Featured artist, production, writing	Babyfather	Babyfather, Arca
"Snm"	2016	Babyfather	BBF hosted by DJ Escrow	Featured artist, production, writing	Babyfather, Arca	Babyfather, Arca
"Mine"	2016	Frank Ocean	Endless	Production, writing	Frank Ocean, Ghersi	Arca
"Take Me Apart"	2017	Kelela	Take Me Apart	Additional production	Kelela Mizanekristos, Dominic Salole, Alexander Shuckburgh, Jordan Asher Cruz	Al Shux, Jam City, Ariel Rechtshaid (add.), Arca (add.), Loric Sih (add.), Kwes (add.)
"Enough"	2017	Kelela	Take Me Apart	Production	Kelela Mizanekristos, Dominic Salole	Arca, Ariel Rechtshaid (add.), Kwes (add.)
"Onanon"	2017	Kelela	Take Me Apart	Production, writing	Kelela Mizanekristos, Jay Prince, Ghersi	Arca, Ariel Rechtshaid (add.)
"Turn to Dust"	2017	Kelela	Take Me Apart	Production, writing	Kelela Mizanekristos, Romy Madley Croft, Jack Latham, Ghersi	Arca, Kwes (add.)
"Arisen My Senses"	2017	Björk	Utopia	Production, composition, electronics, synth melodies, beats	Björk, Arca	Björk, Arca
"The Gate"	2017	Björk	Utopia	Production, composition, electronics, synth melodies, beats	Björk, Arca	Björk, Arca
"Sue Me"	2017	Björk	Utopia	Production, composition, electronics, synth melodies, beats	Björk, Arca	Björk, Arca
"Claimstaker"	2017	Björk	Utopia	Production, composition, electronics, synth melodies, beats	Björk, Arca	Björk, Arca
"Future Forever"	2017	Björk	Utopia	Production, composition, electronics, synth melodies, beats	Björk, Arca	Björk, Arca
"Blissing Me"	2017	Björk	Utopia	Production, electronics, synth melodies, beats	Björk	Björk, Arca
"Utopia"	2017	Björk	Utopia	Production, electronics, synth melodies, beats	Björk	Björk, Arca
"Body Memory"	2017	Björk	Utopia	Production, electronics, synth melodies, beats	Björk	Björk, Arca
"Courtship"	2017	Björk	Utopia	Production, electronics, synth melodies, beats	Björk	Björk, Arca
"Losss"	2017	Björk	Utopia	Production, electronics, synth melodies, beats	Björk	Björk, Rabit, Arca
"Tabula Rasa"	2017	Björk	Utopia	Production, electronics, synth melodies, beats	Björk	Björk, Arca
"Saint"	2017	Björk	Utopia	Production, electronics, synth melodies, beats	Björk	Björk, Arca
"Holy Terrain"	2019	FKA twigs, Future	Magdalene	Vocal processing, synth programming	FKA twigs, Nayvadius Wilburn, Lewis Roberts, Jack Antonoff, Sounwave, Skrillex, Jason Boyd, Petar Lyondev	FKA twigs, Jack Antonoff, Skrillex, Sounwave (add.), Koreless (add.), Kenny Beats (add.)
"Human's Lament"	2021	Juaki Pesudo	Non-album single	Mastering	Juaki Pesudo	Max Feriche Pomés
"Robot's Lament"	2021	Juaki Pesudo	Non-album single	Mastering	Juaki Pesudo	Max Feriche Pomés
"Tears in the Club"	2021	FKA twigs, The Weeknd	Caprisongs	Production, writing	Tahlia Barnett, Abel Tesfaye, Ali Tamposi, Henry Walter, Ghersi, Pablo Díaz-Reixa	Cirkut, Arca, El Guincho
"Thank You Song"	2022	FKA twigs	Caprisongs	Production, writing	Thalia Barnett, Ghersi, Tobias Jesso Jr.	Arca
"Come For Me"	2022	Shygirl	Nymph	Production, writing	Shygirl, Arca	Shygirl, Arca
"Suicide Doors"	2023	Lil Uzi Vert	Pink Tape	Production, writing, additional vocals	Symere Woods, Brandon Veal, Ghersi, Leqn, Yugen	Brandon Finessin, Arca, Leqn, Yugen
"I Feel So Free"	2026	Madonna	Confessions II	Additional production, keyboards, programming	Madonna, Stuart Price, Marvin L Burns	Madonna, Stuart Price, Arca (add.)
"The Test"	2026	Madonna, Lola Leon	Confessions II	Additional production, keyboards, programming	Madonna, Stuart Price, Lola Leon	Madonna, Stuart Price, Arca (add.)
"Sunglasses"	2026	Tinashe	Popstar	Production, writing	Tinashe Kachingwe, Travis Stewart, Arca	Machinedrum, Arca

== Remixes ==
Title	Year	Artist
"Are You That Somebody?"	2011	Aaliyah
"Love You in Chains" (Note: "Love You in Chains" is a remix of Nelly Furtado's song "Showtime", from her third studio album, Loose.)	2011	Nelly Furtado
"Hips Don't Lie"	2014	Shakira
"Lana Monument"	2015	Lana Del Rey
"Async"	2017	Ryuichi Sakamoto
"Little Demon" (Note: "Little Demon" was intended to be released as a vinyl single before getting scrapped.)	2020	Frank Ocean
"Rain on Me" (Note: Included in Lady Gaga's third remix album Dawn of Chromatica)	2021	Lady Gaga and Ariana Grande
"Let Us Dance"	2021	Beverly Glenn-Copeland
"Big Science"	2022	Laurie Anderson
"Colourgrade" (Note: Subtitled "Arca Vortex Remix", it is included in Tirzah's 2022 remix album Highgrade.)	2022	Tirzah
"Arcamarine" (Note: "Arcamarine" is a remix of Addison Rae's 2024 single "Aquamarine".)	2024	Addison Rae
"Electricity"	2025	Hikaru Utada
"Big One"	2025	Ian Isiah
"Sexistential"	2026	Robyn
"As Alive as You Need Me to Be" (Note: Included in Nine Inch Nails's fourth remix album Tron Ares: Divergence)	2026	Nine Inch Nails

== Videography ==
=== Music videos ===
Title	Year	Director(s)	Album
"Ass Swung Low"	2012	Jesse Kanda	Stretch 1
"Manners"	2012	Jesse Kanda	Stretch 2
"Held Apart"	2014	Jesse Kanda	Xen
"Thievery"	2014	Jesse Kanda	Xen
"Now You Know"	2014	Jesse Kanda	Xen
"Xen"	2014	Jesse Kanda	Xen
"Sad Bitch"	2015	Jesse Kanda	Xen
"Soichiro"	2015	Arca	Mutant
"EN"	2015	Arca	Mutant
"Vanity"	2015	Arca and Daniel Sannwald	Mutant
"Front Load"	2015	Jesse Kanda	Mutant
"Anoche"	2017	Jesse Kanda	Arca
"Reverie"	2017	Jesse Kanda	Arca
"Desafío"	2017	Jesse Kanda	Arca
"Arisen My Senses" (Björk)	2017	Jesse Kanda	Utopia
"Fetiche"	2018	Arca and Carlos Sáez	Non-album single
"@@@@@"	2020	Frederik Heyman	@@@@@
"Nonbinary"	2020	Frederik Heyman	Kick I
"Time"	2020	MANSON	Kick I
"Mequetrefe"	2020	Arca, Carlos Sáez and Kynan Puru Watt	Kick I
"Slime" (Shygirl; lyric video)	2020	billkingsnorth and weiprior	Alias
"Madre" (featuring Oliver Coates)	2021	Aron Sanchez	Madre
"Born Yesterday" (featuring Sia)	2021	KinkiFactory	Kick II
"Prada" / "Rakata"	2021	Frederik Heyman	Kick II
"Electra Rex"	2021	Arca and Carlota Guerrero	Kick III
"Cayó"	2022	Albert Moya	Kick
"El Alma Que Te Trajo" (Safety Trance featuring Arca)	2022	Unax LaFuente and Arca	Noches de Terror and Kick
"Яitual"	2023	Albert Moya	Kick
"Incendio"	2023	Arca	Kick III
"Sola"	2025	Daniel Sannwald	Non-album single
"Puta"	2025	STILLZ	Non-album single

=== Collaborative films ===
Title	Year	Director(s)
Trauma	2014	Jesse Kanda & Arca
C2C Festival × Fundaciòn Marcelo Burlon	2021	Weirdcore TV
