= XXXXX (album) =

Studio album by Arca
- Released: 31 July 2026
- Genres: Electronic; experimental; avant-garde; deconstructed club; IDM
- Length: 47:09
- Languages: Spanish; English
- Label: XL
- Producer: Arca

Arca chronology
Kick (2022)	XXXXX (2026)

XXXXX is the ninth studio album by Venezuelan musician Arca. It was released on 31 July 2026 through XL Recordings, marking her first studio album since the Kick series concluded with 2021's Kick IIIII.

The album was announced on 20 July 2026 alongside the reveal of its artwork, track listing, and a livestream performance titled Diva.Experimental transmission, directed by Daniel Sannwald and broadcast from Barcelona ahead of the album's release.

== Background and development ==
Arca released the five albums in her Kick series between June 2020 and December 2021, completing the project by issuing its final four instalments on consecutive days. The pace of the releases contributed to a period of burnout in which she temporarily lost interest in making another album and turned her attention to painting. Arca contrasted the repeated revision possible in recorded music with painting, which required her to accept decisions that could not be undone.

Her paintings formed the series Angels, which was shown at the Institute of Contemporary Arts in London from 4 to 19 April 2026. The exhibition was Arca's first institutional presentation and the first London exhibition devoted to the series. During this period, Arca said that painting had helped her resume making music and referred to the project that became XXXXX as a mixtape.

Arca subsequently decided to release the project as an album without substantially reorganising its material. She described the change in designation as a playful response to expectations surrounding her first full-length release in nearly five years. The running order was retained from the mixtape version, including several brief pieces placed between the longer tracks. Release material referred to "Cinch", "Enraptured", and "Throb" as "experimental diva FM" idents.

== Composition ==
Early reviews described XXXXX as an experimental electronic album incorporating avant-garde production, deconstructed club music, contemporary classical influences, and pop structures. Critics also highlighted recurring themes of transformation, futurism, and transhumanism.

=== Music and structure ===
The album retains the abrupt transitions associated with its original mixtape format. Its arrangements move between sustained drones, walls of noise, metallic percussion, low-frequency pulses, and comparatively open passages built around fragments of Arca's voice. Paul Attard of Slant Magazine associated its severe and unpredictable production with Arca's albums Xen (2014) and Mutant (2015), but he considered the similar elements on XXXXX to have been realised on a larger scale.

The sixteen-track sequence distributes shorter pieces among longer compositions. "No End" introduces the record before the sequence of "Willow", "Eidolon", "Heart", and "Syncope", and "Cinch" separates "Raver" from "Fxck". Near the end of the album, "Enraptured" and "Throb" interrupt the progression from "Grip" to "Everything", preserving the transitional function that the pieces had in the mixtape version.

=== Songs and lyrics ===
"Willow" combines bells, computerised tones, and disruptive percussion before giving way to the heavier low-frequency sounds of "Eidolon". "Heart" uses electronic textures that Ludovic Hunter-Tilney of the Financial Times compared to the circulation of blood through a body. He connected these sounds with the album's presentation of the body as something altered through technology.

"Raver" rearranges elements associated with mainstream electronic dance music, using interruptions and bursts of noise in place of a conventional build and release. Shaad D'Souza of The Guardian compared the frenetic production of "Everything" to the works of Aphex Twin and identified a footwork influence in the faster rhythm of "Fxck". The latter track centres on the repeated phrase "kill the father", which Arca explained as a rejection of internalised patriarchy. She connected the phrase with an attempt to create room for a maternal archetype and a different mythology.

"Taconeando" takes its title from a Spanish-language term for the heel-stamping used in flamenco and tango, relating the track's percussion to a physical movement. The closing track, "Sueño", reduces the density of the preceding arrangements and places screamed vocals at its centre. Arca described the voice as a form of technology and discussed the bodily pressure involved in producing a scream.

== Title and artwork ==
The album's title is five repetitions of the letter X. It continues the naming pattern of Arca's mixtapes &&&&& (2013) and @@@@@ (2020), whose titles are also formed from a character repeated five times.

Kaan Ulgener created the cover artwork, which depicts Arca joined to a large mechanical apparatus beneath two owls. Hunter-Tilney interpreted the combination of the human body and machinery as part of the album's treatment of transhumanism, an association he also found in its electronic sounds and processed vocals.

== Promotion and release ==
Before announcing the album, Arca presented a thirty-minute mix titled Airdoll through a simultaneous radio broadcast on 17 July 2026. Participating stations included NTS Radio, Kiosk Radio, Dublab, East Village Radio, Montez Press Radio, UCLA Radio, and WNYU-FM. As the title of the album had not yet been revealed, the broadcast introduced material from the project without identifying it as XXXXX. NTS subsequently archived its broadcast as Arca Presents Airdoll and classified the programme under electronica, glitch, and experimental music.

The Diva.Experimental performance took place on 23 July and was livestreamed through YouTube and Twitch. Directed by Daniel Sannwald and styled by Akeem Smith, the two-hour production used seven locations in Barcelona. It was filmed inside an abandoned factory and included material from all sixteen tracks, with lighting designed by Matiere Noire. During "Fxck", Arca appeared covered in red paint and spray-painted a canvas on the floor. The performance of "Sueño" used a concrete backdrop, red lighting and spotlights mounted on drones; edited recordings of both segments were later published on her YouTube channel. The night before the album's release, a nightlife theatre in promotion of the release was hosted at the Glaswegian club night, Ponyboy, it was titled "The Doll Factory."

XXXXX was released digitally on 31 July 2026 through XL Recordings. In addition to its digital release, a standard black-vinyl edition was made available for preorder through Arca's Bandcamp page, with shipping scheduled for December 2026.

== Critical reception ==
Professional ratings
Aggregate scores
Source	Rating
AnyDecentMusic?	7.5/10
Metacritic	82/100
Review scores
Source	Rating
Clash	8/10
Financial Times	4/5 stars
The Guardian	4/5 stars
NME	3.5/5 stars
Pitchfork	7.8/10
Slant Magazine	3.5/5 stars
laut.de	4/5 stars
PopMatters	8/10

According to Metacritic, it received "universal acclaim" based on a weighted average score of 82 out of 100 from nine critic scores. Any Decent Music gave the album a weighted average score of 7.5 out of 10 from eight critic scores.

Shaad D'Souza awarded XXXXX four stars in The Guardian and considered it one of Arca's densest and strongest albums. He attributed its intensity to the coexistence of classical composition, deconstructed club music and pop, identifying "Everything" and "Fxck" among its faster pieces. His discussion of "Willow" and "Raver" concentrated on the way both tracks recast familiar forms of dance music through harsher and less predictable arrangements.

Ludovic Hunter-Tilney also awarded the album four stars in the Financial Times. His review focused on the relationship between its electronic production, altered voices, and transhumanist imagery. He found the album less accessible than Arca's reggaeton-influenced releases from 2021, but considered its abstraction sufficiently varied to prevent the music from becoming impenetrable.

Paul Attard gave the album three and a half stars in Slant Magazine, praising the placement of percussion, bass, and vocal fragments, and identifying the middle of the album as its strongest portion. He considered the opening and closing tracks less commanding, describing XXXXX as somewhat amorphous without finding it dull. Mary Chiney selected it as The Quietus's "Album of the Week" and regarded the preservation of its mixtape structure as an effective response to expectations surrounding Arca's return. Her reservations concerned several tracks in the middle of the album and the relative scarcity of the immediate avant-pop hooks heard on Kick I.

Dylan Bedsaul of Clash awarded the album eight out of ten and described it as a return to form comparable to Arca's early mixtapes. Sara Delgado of NME gave it three and a half stars, describing it as Arca's most probing project in several years and concentrating on the use of distortion throughout the record.

John Amen of PopMatters scored the album eight out of ten stars and wrote, "... throughout XXXXX, Arca balances her penchant for excess with a commitment to restraint". He concluded with a fictional vision of a movie titled Arca: Rise of the Posthuman, directed by Julia Ducournau, commenting, "Fast forward: the cyborg, the biomechanoid, is now more human than a human".

== Track listing ==
All tracks are written by Alejandra Ghersi.

No.	Title	Length
1.	"No End"	1:31
2.	"Willow"	3:47
3.	"Eidolon"	3:57
4.	"Heart"	2:30
5.	"Syncope"	3:22
6.	"Raver"	2:20
7.	"Cinch"	1:26
8.	"Fxck"	3:21
9.	"Finisher"	3:43
10.	"Taconeando" (transl. Heel-stomping)	2:18
11.	"Futurality"	3:17
12.	"Grip"	3:10
13.	"Enraptured"	2:11
14.	"Throb"	1:55
15.	"Everything"	4:01
16.	"Sueño" (lit. 'Dream')	4:14
Total length:		47:09

== Personnel ==
Credits are adapted from the album's digital credits and coverage of its artwork.

- Arca – programming, production (all tracks); vocals (tracks 1–4, 7–11, 13, 16)
- Gabriel Schuman – mixing, mastering
- Kaan Ulgener – cover artwork
