= Cayó =

2022 single by Arca

- Single cover (Blurred monochrome image of a figure suspended against a dark paneled background).

Single by Arca
- Language: Spanish
- English title: "It Fell"
- Released: 7 April 2022
- Genre: Electronic
- Length: 2:51
- Label: XL
- Songwriters: Arca; Tim Hecker
- Producers: Arca; Tim Hecker

Arca singles chronology
"Queer" (2021)	"Cayó" (2022)	"El Alma Que Te Trajo" (2022)

Music video
- "Cayó" on Vimeo

"Cayó" (English: "It Fell") is a song by Venezuelan musician and record producer Arca, developed during the recording sessions for her five-album Kick cycle and first presented on an early-2020 edition of her DIVA_EXPERIMENTAL FM transmission on Twitch. The track was omitted from the five albums and circulated online until XL Recordings issued it as a standalone digital single on 7 April 2022, giving the previously available recording its first commercial release. Its title translates as "it fell", and the Spanish-language electronic recording lasts two minutes and 51 seconds, with Arca and Canadian musician Tim Hecker credited as its writers and producers.

The commercial release accompanied the announcement of a physical box set collecting the five Kick albums, and a music video directed by Albert Moya appeared on the same day as part of the launch. Arca incorporated "Cayó" into her discography again in December 2022 by placing it at the beginning of the supplementary disc on Kick, a compilation whose main sequence had been selected through a fan vote. Reviews drew attention to the recording's progression from a sparse synthesiser arrangement towards a percussion-heavy climax, with DIY calling it "short but haunting" and Lucas Villa of Latina describing Arca's vocal performance as hypnotic and prayer-like. The video subsequently received second place in the Best Editor category at the 2022 Berlin Music Video Awards.

== Background and release ==
Arca first played "Cayó" during her DIVA_EXPERIMENTAL FM Twitch transmission in early 2020, when she was developing the material that would form the Kick cycle. The project entered its public release phase with KiCk i in June 2020 and expanded during 2021 through KICK ii, KicK iii, kick iiii and kiCK iiiii, which completed the five-album sequence. Although "Cayó" originated from the same sessions, Arca left it outside the final track listings, and the recording continued to circulate online after the album cycle had concluded. By the time its commercial edition was announced, this circulation had established the song among Arca's listeners, leading James Rettig of Stereogum to describe it as a fan-favourite rarity.

After completing the album cycle, Arca released "Cayó" through XL as a one-track digital single with the catalogue number XL1269DS, making it available through download and streaming services that classified the recording as electronic music. The release date of 7 April 2022 placed the song several months after the final four Kick albums, while its presentation as a standalone single preserved its identity as a recording developed alongside the cycle and excluded from its original editions.

The single's announcement also introduced Kick: The Complete Cycle, a five-LP set that gathered the albums into a physical edition initially scheduled by XL for 20 May 2022. A limited number of copies were advertised with alternate artwork for KiCk i, linking the box set to the album that had opened the cycle two years earlier. By announcing "Cayó" with this collection, Arca placed the song beside the completed sequence while retaining its separate commercial release.

The song entered an album sequence on 9 December 2022, when XL released the two-disc compilation Kick following a vote conducted through Arca's Discord community. The vote determined the 21 songs on the first disc, after which "Cayó" opened a five-track addendum and occupied the 22nd position in the complete running order. Its placement introduced a supplementary group comprising the earlier single "El Alma Que Te Trajo" and the previously unreleased recordings "Alto Voltaje", "Ritual" and "Sentient Savior", all of which were associated with material left outside the original albums.

== Composition, lyrics and reception ==
The 2:51 arrangement of "Cayó" uses vocals, programming, synthesisers, organ and percussion to develop a gradual rise in density, beginning with a restrained electronic texture before reaching a more forceful conclusion. Arca performs the vocals, programming and principal synthesiser parts, and Hecker contributes synthesiser and organ, with both musicians receiving writing and production credits for the completed recording. Eddie Fu of Consequence described the opening through its heavy industrial synthesisers and identified a transition into gothic production, while DIY traced a similar progression towards a crescendo of crashing synthesisers and drums.

The lyrics follow this musical development by organising the opening around repeated references to turning away from the past, after which the image of a final bullet falling introduces a more immediate expression of injury. This progression reaches the phrase me duele ("it hurts me") at the end of the song, where the repeated statement of pain replaces the earlier references to movement and memory. Arca described the recording as an exploration of changing states of self and non-binary relationships with otherness, connecting those subjects to the ways in which identity can be experienced through sensuality and the body.

Critical responses generally followed the song's movement from restraint to accumulation, using its short duration and controlled vocal performance as points of reference for the emotional effect of the arrangement. DIY selected "Cayó" for its weekly "Tracks" column and called it "short but haunting", while Villa characterised the recording as meditative and industrial, drawing particular attention to Arca's hypnotic, prayer-like delivery. Margaret Farrell of Flood Magazine described the song as a "fever-dream track" and identified Hecker's production as part of the sound that connects its sparse beginning with its heavier final passage.

== Music video ==
Released alongside the commercial single on 7 April 2022, the music video translated the song's focus on physical experience into a performance directed by Albert Moya, whose camera alternates between Arca's movement and the environments surrounding her. Wide shots place Arca inside a concrete building and beside a damaged car, while closer views record changes in her facial expression and posture before the video moves to images of her performing across a wet floor. The succession of enclosed spaces, exposed surfaces and close physical detail keeps Arca's body at the centre of the visual sequence as the scale of the shots changes around her.

Villa wrote that the video presents Arca in positions of power and vulnerability, relating the variations in movement and posture to the ideas of embodiment expressed in her statement about the song. Elizabeth Aubrey of NME described the completed video as "haunting", a response that placed its sparse locations and performance imagery within the emotional atmosphere already identified in reviews of the recording. Carlos Font Clos edited the production through Stitch Editing, and his work received second place in the Best Editor category at the 2022 Berlin Music Video Awards.

== Personnel ==
Credits are adapted from Shazam and Sterling Sound.

- Arca – vocals, programming, synthesiser, songwriting, production
- Tim Hecker – synthesiser, organ, composition, production
- Alex Epton – mixing
- Enyang Urbiks – engineering
- Joe LaPorta – mastering
