= Riquiquí;Bronze-Instances(1-100) =

2020 remix album by Arca

- A square QR code used as the album cover

Remix album by Arca
- Released: 16 December 2020
- Genre: Electronic
- Length: 5:49:34
- Label: XL
- Producer: Arca

Arca chronology
Kick I (2020)	Riquiquí;Bronze-Instances(1-100) (2020)	Madre (2021)

Riquiquí;Bronze-Instances(1-100) is a remix album by Venezuelan musician Arca, released by XL Recordings on 16 December 2020. The album is 5 hours, 49 minutes and 34 seconds long and contains 100 versions of "Riquiquí", a song from Arca's album Kick I (2020), generated with the generative music system Bronze. It was the first release for which Arca authorised remixes of her work.

Bronze divides a recording into musical components and varies their sequence and duration within limits set by the artist, who supplies the source material from which the system generates its performances. The album contains fixed recordings of 100 performances generated from Arca's material, and a QR code on the cover opened a web player in which Bronze continued to produce new versions of the song.

Arca began using Bronze when she composed music for Echo, a 2019 installation by Philippe Parreno in the lobby of the Museum of Modern Art (MoMA), and later applied the system to "Riquiquí". Matt Moen discussed the scale of the resulting release, and Tom Breihan examined the differences among neighbouring instances. Philip Sherburne related the project to Arca's experiments with album form in 2021, and Chen Wang's 2025 study examined how creative decisions were distributed between Arca and Bronze.

== Background ==
"Riquiquí" runs for two minutes and forty seconds and appeared on Kick I, which XL released on 26 June 2020. E. R. Pulgar of Crack Magazine described the song as a sex ode in which Arca names reggaeton and dembow as she addresses a prospective lover. Kaelen Bell of Exclaim! described its pop structure as being in "constant collapse and regeneration", with irregular beats and distortion giving way to moments of clarity.

Bronze emerged from a collaboration between songwriter Gwilym Gold, producer Lexxx and a research team at Goldsmiths, University of London, led by Mick Grierson. In May 2011, Gold released his single "Flesh Freeze" through a Mac application that used Bronze to rearrange the lyrics, drum pattern, opening and ending during playback, and he later used the format for his 2012 album Tender Metal, whose parameters kept its variations close to the source songs. Grierson's implementation divided a recording into elements and assigned probabilities to possible changes, which gave producers control over how far each performance could depart from the composition and mix.

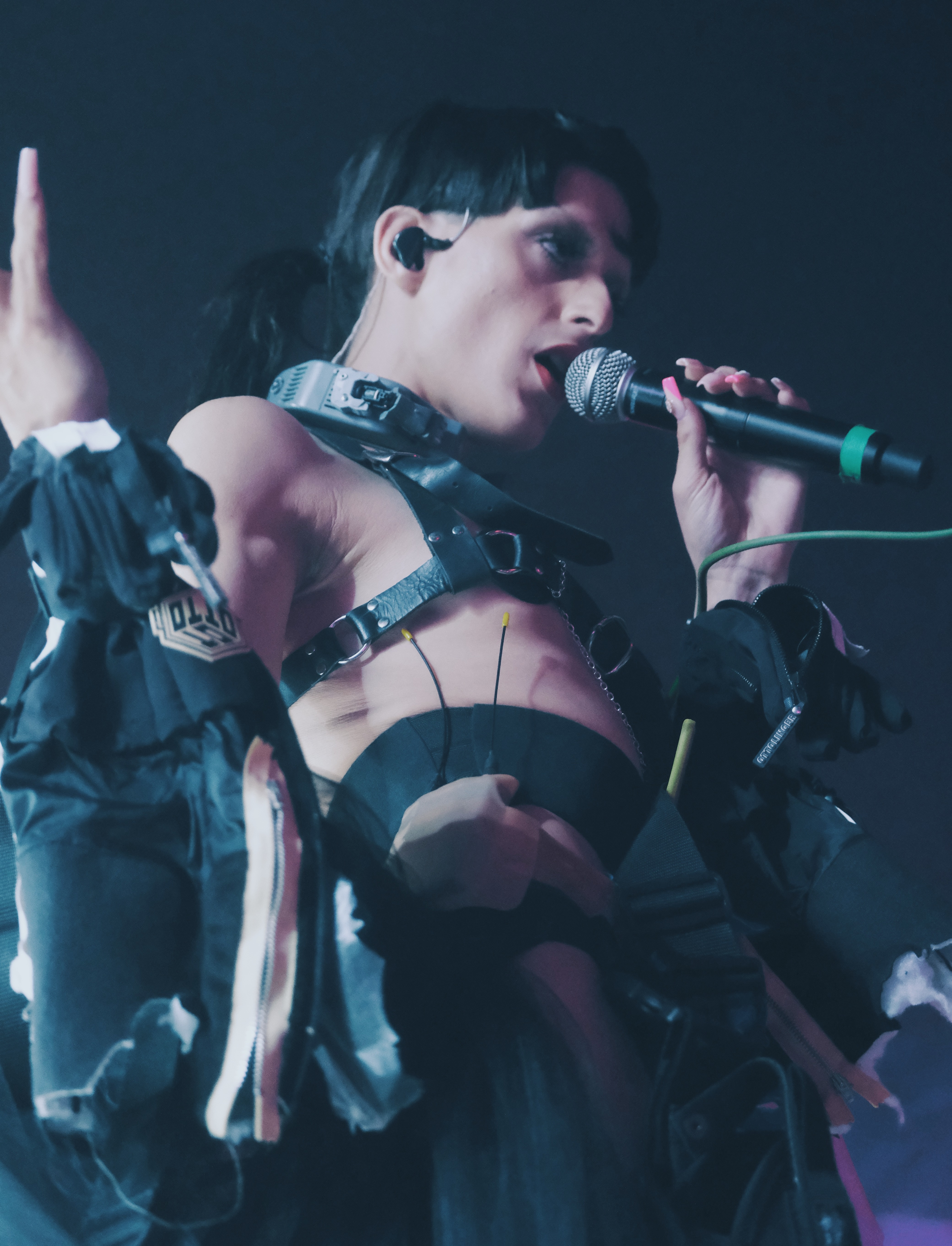
Arca performing in 2019, the year she began working with Bronze

Arca first used Bronze for Parreno's Echo, a site-specific installation commissioned for MoMA's 2019 reopening that used information gathered from the lobby to control motorised sculpture, light, video and sound. Nicolas Becker designed the sound, Arca composed the music, and Lex and Gold programmed Bronze. Changes in the museum caused the system to alter the score and produce a continuous sequence intended to remain unrepeated. Arca recognised her textures and melodies in the output and described the resulting song form as unpredictable.

== Production ==
Arca supplied Bronze with the separate components of "Riquiquí", and the system changed their order and duration to generate 100 permutations, called "instances". In Bronze, the artist's material and permitted variations form a model of possible performances from which the artificial intelligence component selects during playback. Each instance retains recognisable parts of "Riquiquí" through changes ranging from small rearrangements to substantial abstraction of the source.

Each title combines a lowercase Roman numeral with the matching Arabic number in a sequence that begins with "Riquiquí(i1);Bronze-Instance" and ends with "Riquiquí(c100);Bronze-Instance". In the XL edition, the tracks range from 1:18 for instance 48 to 5:07 for instance 4 and total 5:49:34. Apple Music presents the same material as four digital discs of 25 tracks and rounds the total to 5 hours and 50 minutes.

== Release and artwork ==
XL issued Riquiquí;Bronze-Instances(1-100) as a digital release with the catalogue number XL1137DA and offered downloads as 320-kbps MP3 files or as 16-bit WAV and FLAC files. Boomkat sold the same formats, and Apple Music and Spotify carried the four-disc streaming edition from the release date. These services distributed 100 fixed files that document part of the system's output, which can continue beyond the performances included on the album. XL called the project the first commercial release of its kind, and Arca described it as the first official remix release in her catalogue.

The cover is a QR code created by Weirdcore and Andrew Benson from a photograph by Sarah Piantadosi, a format Arca chose to give listeners access to a changing performance of the album. At release, scanning the code opened a live transmission on Arca's website in which Bronze generated the song continuously, and the dynamic version remains available on Bronze's listening site.

== Reception and analysis ==
After calling the album a "five hour and 50 minute kinetic tesseract", Matt Moen of Paper associated its permutations with Kick I's themes of flux and futurism and described their changes as ranging from subtle rearrangements to abstract reworkings. Tom Breihan of Stereogum noted the small differences between neighbouring instances and found the premise "a strange one to wrap your head around".

In a 2021 review of Arca's four subsequent Kick albums, Philip Sherburne of Pitchfork grouped the Bronze project with the long-form releases &&&&&, Entrañas and @@@@@ as experiments with recorded format and associated these releases with transformation and multiplicity in Arca's work. Chen Wang later used the album as a case study of creative agency in AI-assisted music and argued that Arca retained creative agency by preparing the source material and selecting among the variations generated by Bronze.

== Track listing ==
All tracks were written and produced by Arca. Titles and timings are taken from the XL Recordings edition, and the four-disc grouping is taken from Apple Music.

Disc one
No.	Title	Length
1.	"Riquiquí(i1);Bronze-Instance"	4:36
2.	"Riquiquí(ii2);Bronze-Instance"	2:58
3.	"Riquiquí(iii3);Bronze-Instance"	3:35
4.	"Riquiquí(iv4);Bronze-Instance"	5:07
5.	"Riquiquí(v5);Bronze-Instance"	4:59
6.	"Riquiquí(vi6);Bronze-Instance"	4:09
7.	"Riquiquí(vii7);Bronze-Instance"	2:44
8.	"Riquiquí(viii8);Bronze-Instance"	3:43
9.	"Riquiquí(ix9);Bronze-Instance"	4:04
10.	"Riquiquí(x10);Bronze-Instance"	3:54
11.	"Riquiquí(xi11);Bronze-Instance"	3:42
12.	"Riquiquí(xii12);Bronze-Instance"	3:30
13.	"Riquiquí(xiii13);Bronze-Instance"	2:36
14.	"Riquiquí(xiv14);Bronze-Instance"	5:05
15.	"Riquiquí(xv15);Bronze-Instance"	4:02
16.	"Riquiquí(xvi16);Bronze-Instance"	3:21
17.	"Riquiquí(xvii17);Bronze-Instance"	4:40
18.	"Riquiquí(xviii18);Bronze-Instance"	3:03
19.	"Riquiquí(xix19);Bronze-Instance"	4:01
20.	"Riquiquí(xx20);Bronze-Instance"	3:11
21.	"Riquiquí(xxi21);Bronze-Instance"	2:47
22.	"Riquiquí(xxii22);Bronze-Instance"	4:13
23.	"Riquiquí(xxiii23);Bronze-Instance"	3:02
24.	"Riquiquí(xxiv24);Bronze-Instance"	3:03
25.	"Riquiquí(xxv25);Bronze-Instance"	4:09
Total length:		94:14

Disc two
No.	Title	Length
1.	"Riquiquí(xxvi26);Bronze-Instance"	3:28
2.	"Riquiquí(xxvii27);Bronze-Instance"	3:12
3.	"Riquiquí(xxviii28);Bronze-Instance"	3:04
4.	"Riquiquí(xxix29);Bronze-Instance"	3:46
5.	"Riquiquí(xxx30);Bronze-Instance"	2:35
6.	"Riquiquí(xxxi31);Bronze-Instance"	4:58
7.	"Riquiquí(xxxii32);Bronze-Instance"	3:20
8.	"Riquiquí(xxxiii33);Bronze-Instance"	3:35
9.	"Riquiquí(xxxiv34);Bronze-Instance"	3:47
10.	"Riquiquí(xxxv35);Bronze-Instance"	3:00
11.	"Riquiquí(xxxvi36);Bronze-Instance"	2:46
12.	"Riquiquí(xxxvii37);Bronze-Instance"	3:39
13.	"Riquiquí(xxxviii38);Bronze-Instance"	3:41
14.	"Riquiquí(xxxix39);Bronze-Instance"	4:30
15.	"Riquiquí(xl40);Bronze-Instance"	3:55
16.	"Riquiquí(xli41);Bronze-Instance"	3:42
17.	"Riquiquí(xlii42);Bronze-Instance"	2:04
18.	"Riquiquí(xliii43);Bronze-Instance"	3:42
19.	"Riquiquí(xliv44);Bronze-Instance"	3:40
20.	"Riquiquí(xlv45);Bronze-Instance"	2:52
21.	"Riquiquí(xlvi46);Bronze-Instance"	3:40
22.	"Riquiquí(xlvii47);Bronze-Instance"	4:36
23.	"Riquiquí(xlviii48);Bronze-Instance"	1:18
24.	"Riquiquí(xlix49);Bronze-Instance"	4:11
25.	"Riquiquí(l50);Bronze-Instance"	3:09
Total length:		86:10

Disc three
No.	Title	Length
1.	"Riquiquí(li51);Bronze-Instance"	3:00
2.	"Riquiquí(lii52);Bronze-Instance"	4:26
3.	"Riquiquí(liii53);Bronze-Instance"	2:11
4.	"Riquiquí(liv54);Bronze-Instance"	3:50
5.	"Riquiquí(lv55);Bronze-Instance"	3:40
6.	"Riquiquí(lvi56);Bronze-Instance"	2:59
7.	"Riquiquí(lvii57);Bronze-Instance"	4:34
8.	"Riquiquí(lviii58);Bronze-Instance"	3:59
9.	"Riquiquí(lix59);Bronze-Instance"	3:33
10.	"Riquiquí(lx60);Bronze-Instance"	4:18
11.	"Riquiquí(lxi61);Bronze-Instance"	2:26
12.	"Riquiquí(lxii62);Bronze-Instance"	3:28
13.	"Riquiquí(lxiii63);Bronze-Instance"	4:20
14.	"Riquiquí(lxiv64);Bronze-Instance"	3:57
15.	"Riquiquí(lxv65);Bronze-Instance"	3:00
16.	"Riquiquí(lxvi66);Bronze-Instance"	3:35
17.	"Riquiquí(lxvii67);Bronze-Instance"	2:35
18.	"Riquiquí(lxviii68);Bronze-Instance"	4:05
19.	"Riquiquí(lxix69);Bronze-Instance"	2:54
20.	"Riquiquí(lxx70);Bronze-Instance"	2:40
21.	"Riquiquí(lxxi71);Bronze-Instance"	4:42
22.	"Riquiquí(lxxii72);Bronze-Instance"	3:59
23.	"Riquiquí(lxxiii73);Bronze-Instance"	3:17
24.	"Riquiquí(lxxiv74);Bronze-Instance"	3:50
25.	"Riquiquí(lxxv75);Bronze-Instance"	3:49
Total length:		89:07

Disc four
No.	Title	Length
1.	"Riquiquí(lxxvi76);Bronze-Instance"	2:20
2.	"Riquiquí(lxxvii77);Bronze-Instance"	4:01
3.	"Riquiquí(lxxviii78);Bronze-Instance"	2:57
4.	"Riquiquí(lxxix79);Bronze-Instance"	3:30
5.	"Riquiquí(lxxx80);Bronze-Instance"	2:46
6.	"Riquiquí(lxxxi81);Bronze-Instance"	3:12
7.	"Riquiquí(lxxxii82);Bronze-Instance"	3:32
8.	"Riquiquí(lxxxiii83);Bronze-Instance"	3:49
9.	"Riquiquí(lxxxiv84);Bronze-Instance"	4:06
10.	"Riquiquí(lxxxv85);Bronze-Instance"	3:32
11.	"Riquiquí(lxxxvi86);Bronze-Instance"	2:13
12.	"Riquiquí(lxxxvii87);Bronze-Instance"	3:22
13.	"Riquiquí(lxxxviii88);Bronze-Instance"	1:45
14.	"Riquiquí(lxxxix89);Bronze-Instance"	3:44
15.	"Riquiquí(xc90);Bronze-Instance"	2:01
16.	"Riquiquí(xci91);Bronze-Instance"	4:22
17.	"Riquiquí(xcii92);Bronze-Instance"	3:05
18.	"Riquiquí(xciii93);Bronze-Instance"	3:19
19.	"Riquiquí(xciv94);Bronze-Instance"	2:21
20.	"Riquiquí(xcv95);Bronze-Instance"	4:34
21.	"Riquiquí(xcvi96);Bronze-Instance"	1:27
22.	"Riquiquí(xcvii97);Bronze-Instance"	3:08
23.	"Riquiquí(xcviii98);Bronze-Instance"	3:13
24.	"Riquiquí(xcix99);Bronze-Instance"	3:16
25.	"Riquiquí(c100);Bronze-Instance"	4:28
Total length:		80:03

== Personnel ==
- Arca – vocals, composition, lyrics, production, programming, mixing engineer
- Gwilym Gold – programming
- Lexxx – programming
- Andrew Benson – artwork
- Weirdcore – artwork
- Sarah Piantadosi – photography
