= Kick IIII =

Studio album by Arca
- Released: 2 December 2021
- Recorded: 2018–2021
- Genres: Witch house; wave; shoegaze; trance; alternative R&B; ambient pop
- Length: 36:38
- Languages: Spanish; English
- Label: XL
- Producer: Arca

Arca chronology
Kick III (2021)	Kick IIII (2021)	Kick IIIII (2021)

Singles from Kick IIII
- 1. "Queer" Released: 18 November 2021

Kick IIII (stylized as kick iiii) is the seventh studio album by Venezuelan record producer and singer Arca. The album was scheduled to be released on 3 December 2021, but released early on 2 December 2021, through XL Recordings as a continuation to her 2021 record Kick III, and is the fourth entry in the Kick quintet. Kick IIII was supported by the accompanying lead single "Queer" featuring Planningtorock, and features cellist Oliver Coates, Garbage frontwoman Shirley Manson, Planningtorock, as well as production from Cardopusher.

== Background ==
Upon the release of Kick I, news surfaced that Arca would be releasing three more Kick albums to make a tetralogy. The artist took to Pitchfork to say: "There will be four volumes. The third one is a little bit more introverted than Kick I, a little bit more like my self-titled album, I guess. The fourth one is piano only, no vocals. Right now, the least defined one, strangely, is the third one. It's all gestating right now [...] Each Kick exists in a kind of quantum state until the day that I send it to mastering. I try to not commit until I have to. But I have a vision for it. The second one is heavy on backbeats, vocal manipulation, mania, and craziness."

In the following year, Arca released her extended play Madre and took part in Dawn of Chromatica, a remix album by Lady Gaga, where she remixed the Ariana Grande collaboration "Rain on Me". While talking about the song on social media, Arca stated: "It's also the last time I playfully deconstruct my songs 'Time' and 'Mequetrefe', as we say goodbye to the Kick I era and move into the Kick II era and beyond". Kick IIII was announced on November 18, alongside the release of the lead single "Queer" featuring vocals from English musician planningtorock. Arca described the album as "entry of sensual charge in the cycle; my own faith made into song, a posthuman celestial sparkle, psychosexual pulsewidth modulation, queering the void, abyss alchemically transmuted into a deconstruction of what is beautiful, it is a healing spell, recognition of the alien inside, a bursting apart of old skin, fresh new sinew rippling outward from a beating core, the first prenatal kick—proof that there is a sentience with a will beyond its creators’ control expressing itself from within the womb."

== Critical reception ==
Professional ratings
Aggregate scores
Source	Rating
AnyDecentMusic?	7.7/10
Metacritic	77/100
Review scores
Source	Rating
AllMusic	4/5 stars
The A.V. Club	B−
Evening Standard	4/5 stars
Exclaim!	8/10
The Guardian	4/5 stars
The Line of Best Fit	8/10
Loud and Quiet	8/10
NME	4/5 stars
Pitchfork	7.7/10
The Skinny	4/5 stars

On review aggregate site Metacritic, Kick IIII received a score of 77 out of 100, based on reviews from 13 critics, indicating "generally favorable reviews".

== Track listing ==
All tracks written and produced by Arca, unless noted otherwise.

No.	Title	Writer(s)	Producer(s)	Length
1.	"Whoresong"			2:14
2.	"Esuna" (featuring Oliver Coates)	Ghersi; Oliver Coates		2:19
3.	"Xenomorphgirl"			2:55
4.	"Queer" (featuring Planningtorock)	Ghersi; CardoPusher; Planningtorock	Ghersi; CardoPusher	3:30
5.	"Witch" (featuring No Bra)	Ghersi; No Bra	Ghersi; No Bra	3:32
6.	"Hija" (transl. Daughter)			2:45
7.	"Boquifloja" (transl. Slackmouth)			5:22
8.	"Alien Inside" (featuring Shirley Manson)	Ghersi; Shirley Manson		2:04
9.	"Altar"			3:37
10.	"Lost Woman Found"			4:12
11.	"Paw"			4:08
Total length:				36:38

Interpolates

- "Alien Inside" contains interpolation of previous Arca track: "Construct" from the mixtape "@@@@@".
