= Kick III =

2021 studio album by Arca

Studio album by Arca
- Released: 1 December 2021
- Recorded: 2018–2021
- Genres: Electronic; deconstructed club; glitch hop; dance; psychedelic; reggaeton; cumbia; noise
- Length: 35:38
- Languages: Spanish; English
- Label: XL
- Producer: Arca

Arca chronology
| Kick II (2021) | Kick III (2021) | Kick IIII (2021) |

Singles from Kick III
- 1. "Incendio" Released: 27 September 2021; 2. "Electra Rex" Released: 9 November 2021

Kick III (stylized as KicK iii; pronounced "kick three") is the sixth studio album by Venezuelan musician and record producer Arca. The album was originally scheduled to be released on 3 December 2021, but was released two days early on 1 December through XL Recordings. It is the third entry in the five-part Kick series, which began with her 2020 album Kick I. Kick II, Kick III, Kick IIII and Kick IIIII were released during the same week. The album was preceded by the singles "Incendio" and "Electra Rex". It received generally favorable reviews from critics.

== Background ==
Following the release of Kick I, Arca initially stated that she intended to release two further Kick albums to complete a trilogy. In a May 2020 interview with Pitchfork, however, she said that the project had expanded to five volumes. At that stage, she described the third installment as "a little bit more introverted than Kick I" and similar to her self-titled album, while also calling it the least defined volume of the series. Arca explained that each album remained in a "quantum state" until it was sent for mastering.

In the following year, Arca released her extended play Madre and took part in Dawn of Chromatica, a remix album by Lady Gaga, for which she remixed the Ariana Grande collaboration "Rain on Me". While discussing the song on social media, Arca stated that it marked the final time she would deconstruct her songs "Time" and "Mequetrefe", as she was moving beyond the Kick I era.

On 27 September, Arca released the single "Incendio". Kick III was announced on 9 November alongside the release of "Electra Rex", and was initially scheduled to be released on the same day as Kick II. Arca's description of the album had changed significantly by that point; she described it as "a portal directly into the more manic, violently euphoric and aggressively psychedelic sound palettes in the series" and "the most incendiary entry in the Kick universe". With the announcement of Kick IIII, Arca confirmed that Kick III would focus "more on heavy club music".

Although it had been announced for 3 December, the album was released on 1 December 2021, one day after the early release of Kick II. The album artwork was created by 3D artist Frederik Heyman and was drawn from imagery developed for the "Prada/Rakata" music video.

== Composition ==
Kick III is a deconstructed club, glitch hop, psychedelic, reggaeton, cumbia, dance, electronic and noise album.

The opening track, "Bruja", is a ballroom track, described as "filled with sass and contagious energy". "Incendio" is an industrial rap song whose production combines vehicle-like noises and heavy percussion with rapidly shifting vocals, including quasi-rapped passages, shouts and laughter. "Rubberneck" blends IDM and operatic pop, incorporating "punishing industrial thuds" and a sense of controlled chaos. "Señorita" is a "glitchy", hip hop-influenced song that functions as the album's "punchy lyrical centerpiece".

"Electra Rex" is underpinned by a cavernous trap beat and syncopated percussion; its title combines the Greek mythological tragedies of Electra and Oedipus Rex. "Skullqueen" mimics clubgoers stepping outside for fresh air before returning to the euphoric darkness of the club. The album closes with "Joya", a ballad that has been compared to Homogenic-era Björk and "closes iii on a note of all-encompassing peace".

== Critical reception ==
Professional ratings
Aggregate scores
| Source | Rating |
|---|---|
| AnyDecentMusic? | 7.7/10 |
| Metacritic | 78/100 |
Review scores
| Source | Rating |
| AllMusic | 4/5 stars |
| The A.V. Club | B− |
| Evening Standard | 4/5 stars |
| Exclaim! | 8/10 |
| The Guardian | 4/5 stars |
| The Line of Best Fit | 8/10 |
| Loud and Quiet | 8/10 |
| NME | 4/5 stars |
| Pitchfork | 8.3/10 |
| The Skinny | 4/5 stars |

On the review aggregator Metacritic, Kick III received "generally favorable reviews", based on a weighted average score of 78 out of 100 from 14 critics. Red Dziri, writing for The Line of Best Fit, called Kick III "one of [Arca]'s most accomplished works to date". Max Freedman of The A.V. Club identified "Incendio" as the "clear peak" of the entire quintet. Safiya Hopfe of Exclaim! wrote that the album lacked narrative consistency but created an overpowering and inescapable atmosphere through its expansions and distillations of sound. By contrast, Evening Standard critic David Smyth described the project as "hyperactive and jittery to a generally irritating extent".

Kick III was named the second-best album of 2021 by The Atlantic and was nominated for Best Electronic Record at the 2022 Libera Awards.

== Track listing ==
All tracks were written and produced by Arca, unless otherwise noted.

| No. | Title | Writer(s) | Producer(s) | Length |
|---|---|---|---|---|
| 1. | "Bruja" (transl. Witch) | Alejandra Ghersi; Daniel Benza | Arca; Benza | 3:50 |
| 2. | "Incendio" (transl. Fire) | Ghersi; Mark Luva | Arca; Luva | 2:44 |
| 3. | "Morbo" (transl. Morbid) | | | 2:15 |
| 4. | "Fiera" (transl. Fierce) | | | 4:28 |
| 5. | "Skullqueen" | | | 2:33 |
| 6. | "Electra Rex" | | | 2:08 |
| 7. | "Ripples" | | | 2:09 |
| 8. | "Rubberneck" | Ghersi; Max Tundra | Arca; Max Tundra | 2:28 |
| 9. | "Señorita" (transl. Miss) | Ghersi; Machinedrum | Arca; Machinedrum | 2:21 |
| 10. | "My 2" | | | 3:15 |
| 11. | "Intimate Flesh" | | | 3:32 |
| 12. | "Joya" (transl. Jewel) | | | 3:55 |
| Total length: | | | | 35:38 |

== Release history ==
List of release dates, showing region, format, label and reference
| Region | Date | Format(s) | Label | Ref. |
|---|---|---|---|---|
| Various | 1 December 2021 | Streaming; digital download | XL | |

== Charts ==
Chart performance for Kick III
| Chart (2022) | Peak position |
|---|---|
| UK Independent Album Breakers (Official Charts Company) | 14 |
| US Current Album Sales (Billboard) | 80 |
