= Sheep (mixtape) =

2015 mixtape by Arca

Mixtape by Arca
- Released: 13 January 2015
- Genre: Deconstructed club
- Length: 16:55
- Producer: Arca

Arca chronology
Xen (2014)	Sheep (2015)	Mutant (2015)

Sheep is the second mixtape by Venezuelan electronic producer Arca. It was released on 13 January 2015 for free download. The mix is an eleven-song musical score Arca performed at Hood by Air's show at the Pitti Uomo 87 fashion event in Florence, Italy.

== Background and release ==
Sheep was released a few weeks after Arca's cover of Shakira's "Hips Don't Lie" for Dazed after being placed at #3 on the Dazed 100, a list of the hundred most influential people shaping youth culture. On the same week of the mix's release, it was revealed that Arca would be co-producing Björk's Vulnicura record. The mix served as the soundtrack to the 2015 Hood By Air fashion show for Pitti Uomo 87 in Florence, Italy. She shared the mix on SoundCloud after performing it at the event.

In an early press release, "Sifter" was titled "Faggot", but was renamed "Sifter" on the final track list. Similarly, downloading Sheep reveals that the file is titled "Pity the Homo". Arca confirmed via Twitter that these were her working titles, and that she changed them herself to be "more subtle." Some of the tracks on Sheep were later reprised on to Arca's second studio album Mutant, which was released later that year.

== Critical reception ==
Professional ratings
Review scores
Source	Rating
Tiny Mix Tapes	4/5 marks
Sputnikmusic	3.5/5

Sheep was featured as Pitchfork's "Best New Track", stating that "Arca is still setting the trends." Tiny Mix Tapes wrote: "The mix splendidly downplays the melodic nuances that worked so well on Xen; those interjecting high tones and bass-heavy counterpoints bleed into each other here to provide an unwavering soundscape. It's like a scrapbook of equally lavish and boisterous ideas that leap out of the page; though not fully formed, they make up a remarkable whole. These ideas bridge each "stage" in a fashion so dissimilar to the clearly defined &&&&& or anything at all from the Stretch EPs, forcing Arca's aesthetic to sound more debauched than ever. Sheep works as a platform (or even a catwalk), then, for Arca to celebrate [her] most off-kilter preferences." Sputnikmusic said that "Sheep is fascinating in that it makes a complete stylistic detour from Xen while retaining the latter's core-aesthetic, manipulating it in such a way that the two become polar opposites, atmospherically. The extra-terrestrial vibe that appears to be something of a signature for Arca remains, but [her] characteristically warm, endearing, nonchalant approach has shifted towards something more deliberate and maddening." Consequence of Sound said "the mix runs the sonic and emotional gamut, from moments of pounding aggression and galactic wooziness to pulsating sensuality and even hymnal meditation." Dummy Mag said the mix "builds and releases in waves of terrifying and angelic sounds."

== Track listing ==
All tracks are written by Arca.

Sheep track listing
No.	Title	Length
1.	"Matriarch"	1:19
2.	"Pity"	1:02
3.	"Drowning"	0:46
4.	"En"	1:31
5.	"Sifter"	0:44
6.	"Submissive"	1:29
7.	"Umbilical"	2:09
8.	"Hymn"	1:52
9.	"Don't / Else"	1:42
10.	"At Last I Am Free"	0:44
11.	"Immortal"	3:34
Total length:		14:53

Sample credits

- "Sifter" contains a sample of "Yayo Ha /W Lana Del Rey" by Beek.
- "At Last I Am Free (interlude)" contains a sample of "At Last I Am Free" by Robert Wyatt.
- "Immortal" contains a sample of "Enjoy" by Björk.

== Personnel ==
- Arca – production
- Matt Colton – mastering
- Jesse Kanda – artwork
