= && =

&& is a double ampersand, and may refer to:

- Label value operator for Computed GOTO
- Short-circuit AND in several programming languages
- Rvalue reference in C++

== See also ==
- &&&&&
