= Thievery =

Thievery may refer to:

- Theft
- Thievery Corporation, a music band
- Thievery UT, a mod for the video game Unreal Tournament
- "Thievery", a 2014 song by Arca
