= Kick II =

Studio album by Arca
- Released: 30 November 2021
- Recorded: 2018–2021
- Genres: Electronic; experimental; avant-garde; reggaeton; pop; cumbia
- Length: 33:56
- Languages: Spanish; English
- Label: XL
- Producer: Arca

Arca chronology
Madre (2021)	Kick II (2021)	Kick III (2021)

Singles from Kick II
- 1. "Born Yesterday" Released: 4 October 2021; 2. "Prada" / "Rakata" Released: 3 November 2021

Kick II (stylized as KICK ii; pronounced “kick two”) is the fifth studio album by Venezuelan record producer and singer Arca. The album was scheduled to be released on 3 December 2021, but released early on 30 November 2021, through XL Recordings as a continuation to her (Note: Arca uses she/her, it/its and they/them pronouns. This article uses she/her pronouns for consistency.) 2020 record Kick I, and is the second entry in Kick quintet. Kick II was supported by three singles: "Born Yesterday", featuring vocals by Australian musician Sia, as well as "Prada" and "Rakata", released as a double single. Its cover art was photographed by Frederik Heyman. The album received positive reviews and was nominated for the Libera Award for Best Latin Album and the Latin Grammy Award for Best Alternative Music Album.

== Background ==
Upon the release of Kick I, news surfaced that Arca would be releasing two more Kick albums to make a trilogy. The artist took to Pitchfork to say: "There will be four volumes. The third one is a little bit more introverted than Kick I, a little bit more like my self-titled album, I guess. The fourth one is piano only, no vocals. Right now, the least defined one, strangely, is the third one. It's all gestating right now [...] Each Kick exists in a kind of quantum state until the day that I send it to mastering. I try to not commit until I have to. But I have a vision for it. The second one is heavy on backbeats, vocal manipulation, mania, and craziness."

In the following year, Arca released her extended play Madre and took part in Dawn of Chromatica, a remix album by Lady Gaga, where she remixed the Ariana Grande collaboration "Rain on Me". While talking about the song on social media, Arca stated: "It's also the last time I playfully deconstruct my songs 'Time' and 'Mequetrefe', as we say goodbye to the Kick I era and move into the Kick II era and beyond". On September 27, the producer released a new song, "Incendio" to critical acclaim. A week later, she revealed the release date, tracklist and cover art of her upcoming album Kick II alongside its lead single, "Born Yesterday" featuring Sia. The song incorporates a leaked Sia demo that had been online for a few years, purportedly originally written for Katy Perry.

With Kick IIII's announcement, Arca confirmed Kick II's sonic palette would be "a deconstruction and reinterpretation of reggaeton".

== Composition ==
Kick II is primarily an electronic, experimental, avant-garde, reggaeton, pop and cumbia album. Album opener "Doña" features "eerie looping vocal mantras and squelching samples" and is "intentionally loose and disorienting, so when that familiar dembow rhythm locks in on the following track, the hypnotic pull is felt instantly". "Prada" and "Luna Llena" features "dreamy atmospheres float[ing] behind the driving rhythms" and garnered comparisons to Arca's 2017 self-titled album. The later track turns its "blurry, fuzzy synths, compressed reggaeton bump, and Ghersi's slow-pouring contralto resemble pining distilled into sound, and the titular image of a full moon feels similarly romantic". "Araña" is a deconstructed club track that "wiggles and crashes like a toy robot going haywire" and "invites listeners to tune into something resembling the soundtrack to a video game gone wrong". "Muñecas" is "a haunting collage featuring contributions from Mica Levi". "Born Yesterday" is a pop power ballad whose "eerie otherworldly musings are subdued by a hypnotic dancefloor beat on the cusp of dissolution".

== Critical reception ==
Professional ratings
Aggregate scores
Source	Rating
AnyDecentMusic?	7.7/10
Metacritic	76/100
Review scores
Source	Rating
AllMusic	4/5 stars
The A.V. Club	B−
Evening Standard	4/5 stars
Exclaim!	8/10
The Guardian	4/5 stars
The Line of Best Fit	8/10
Loud and Quiet	8/10
NME	4/5 stars
Pitchfork	7.4/10
The Skinny	4/5 stars

On review aggregate site Metacritic, Kick II received a score of 76 out of 100, based on reviews from 14 critics, indicating "generally favorable reviews". Safiya Hopfe, writing for Exclaim! praised the albums hooks, saying "even at her most accessible, Arca refuses to paint from a predictable palette. But for all her experimentation and chaotic tangents, it is clear in Kick II that she is acutely aware of the balance necessary to build a bop." Evening Standard's David Smyth considered Kick II the "most complete experience as a single album" out of the entire quintet. Conversely, Lewis Wade of The Skinny called it "some of the least interesting music of the whole collection" and said that if the album was "more avant-garde, or more ephemeral, it may have worked better, but it doesn't hit with the intensity it should".

== Track listing ==
No.	Title	Writer(s)	Producer(s)	Length
1.	"Doña" (transl. "Mrs.")	Alejandra Ghersi	Arca	1:46
2.	"Prada"	Ghersi; Cardopusher	Arca; Cardopusher	2:43
3.	"Rakata"	Ghersi; Cardopusher	Arca; Cardopusher	2:31
4.	"Tiro" (transl. "Shot")	Ghersi; Boys Noize; Cardopusher	Arca; Boys Noize; Cardopusher	2:18
5.	"Luna Llena" (transl. "Full Moon")	Ghersi	Arca; Cubeatz; Jenius Level; WondaGurl	3:19
6.	"Lethargy"	Ghersi	Arca	2:07
7.	"Araña" (transl. "Spider")	Ghersi	Arca	4:17
8.	"Femme"	Ghersi	Arca	1:42
9.	"Muñecas" (transl. "Dolls")	Ghersi; Mica Levi	Arca; Levi	3:33
10.	"Confianza" (transl. "Confidence")	Ghersi; Cardopusher; Chris Clark	Arca; Cardopusher; Clark	1:47
11.	"Born Yesterday" (featuring Sia)	Ghersi; Jmike; Sia	Arca; Jmike	3:18
12.	"Andro"	Ghersi	Arca	4:35
Total length:				33:56

== Release history ==
List of release dates, showing region, format(s), label(s) and reference(s)
Region	Date	Format(s)	Label(s)	Ref.
Various	December 3, 2021	Streaming; digital download	XL	

== Charts ==
Chart performance for Kick II
Chart (2022)	Peak position
UK Independent Album Breakers (Official Charts Company)	16
US Current Album Sales (Billboard)	83
