= Mutant (album) =

2015 studio album by Arca

Studio album by Arca
- Released: 20 November 2015
- Genres: Experimental; electronic
- Length: 62:06
- Label: Mute
- Producer: Alejandra Ghersi

Arca chronology
Sheep (2015)	Mutant (2015)	Entrañas (2016)

Singles from Mutant
- 1. "Vanity" Released: 31 May 2015; 2. "Soichiro" Released: 28 September 2015; 3. "EN" Released: 15 October 2015; 4. "Front Load" Released: 23 November 2015

Mutant is the second studio album by Venezuelan electronic music producer Arca, released on 20 November 2015 via Mute, being her last album for the record label. Arca called it a chronicle of "sensuality and impulsiveness as escape routes out of rigidity". It was promoted with four singles, critically acclaimed upon release, and ranked as Tiny Mix Tapes' favorite album of 2015.

== Composition ==
The Independent described Mutant as an album of "intricately layered sound collages" in which Arca employs mostly machine-made textures "to convey extremes of emotion – be it euphoria, menace, paranoia, melancholy." Sam Richards of NME wrote that while Arca was clearly influenced by R&B, hip hop and dubstep, she distorts and subverts these "familiar aural cues", "never allowing [her] beats to lock into conventional grooves." She commented that "Sever" and "Faggot" use elements of trap, while the calm interludes "Else" and "Extent" act as counterpoints to the record's "more disorientating noise assaults."

Rachel Aroesti of The Guardian said that Mutant profiles Arca's experimental work, eschewing the "corrupted hip-hop beats" of her earlier work in favor of a style that had grown "[i]ncreasingly unaccountable to any kind of rhythmic framework". She added that the music often typically comprises "stabs of industrial sound that eventually assemble into a cranking, Frankenstein's monster of a refrain". Simon Chandler of PopMatters said that "Mutant has Arca throwing everything — glitch, IDM, dubstep, industrial, techno, ambient, noise and world music — into an experimental microcosm of a record, an electronic hothouse where every conceivable touchstone coexists in an awkward, ugly but ultimately breathtaking harmony." She considered this "brand of inchoate, diversified electronica to be "music for a globalized world, for an Earth in which ancient traditions sit alongside the often devastating power of new technologies".

== Critical reception ==
Professional ratings
Aggregate scores
Source	Rating
AnyDecentMusic?	7.7/10
Metacritic	81/100
Review scores
Source	Rating
AllMusic	4/5 stars
Consequence	B+
Financial Times	4/5 stars
The Guardian	4/5 stars
NME	4/5
The Observer	3/5 stars
Pitchfork	8.4/10
Resident Advisor	3.2/5
Spin	8/10
Vice	A−

Mutant received widespread acclaim from contemporary music critics. At Metacritic, which assigns a normalized rating out of 100 to reviews from mainstream critics, the album received an average score of 81, based on 21 reviews, which indicates "universal acclaim".

Mark Richardson of Pitchfork gave the album a very positive review, finding that compared to Arca's previous album Xen, Mutant often eschews the influence of pop and chamber music in favor of more abstract sound design, elaborating that while tracks on the former resembled the works of contemporary electronic and experimental music projects such as Aphex Twin and Alarm Will Sound, Mutant "avoid[s] proper songs" in favor of creating soundscapes and drones. Richardson concludes, "On Mutant, Ghersi turns a fixation on porousness and instability into a kind of spiritual pursuit."

Writing for Exclaim!, Daryl Keating felt Mutant to be an "eventually rewarding", but not an easy listen, arguing that the album lacked in focus compared to her collaborative works with other artists such as Kanye West and Björk.

Publication	Accolade	Year	Rank
Pitchfork	The 50 Best Albums of 2015	2015	38
Tiny Mix Tapes	2015: Favorite 50 Music Releases	2015	1

== Track listing ==
All tracks are written by Alejandra Ghersi.

No.	Title	Length
1.	"Alive"	3:56
2.	"Mutant"	7:27
3.	"Vanity"	4:16
4.	"Sinner"	3:35
5.	"Anger"	2:00
6.	"Sever"	2:13
7.	"Beacon"	0:48
8.	"Snakes"	4:50
9.	"Else"	2:30
10.	"Umbilical"	2:09
11.	"Hymn"	1:57
12.	"Front Load"	2:44
13.	"Gratitud" (transl. Gratitude)	3:44
14.	"EN"	3:04
15.	"Siren Interlude"	0:43
16.	"Extent"	2:34
17.	"Enveloped"	2:22
18.	"Faggot"	3:10
19.	"Soichiro"	4:35
20.	"Peonies"	3:29
Total length:		62:06

Japanese bonus track
No.	Title	Length
21.	"Ashland"	5:07
Total length:		67:13

== Personnel ==
- Songwriter/producer – Alejandra Ghersi
- Artwork – Jesse Kanda
- Mastered By – Matt Colton

== Charts ==
Chart (2015)	Peak position
US Top Dance Albums (Billboard)	9
US Heatseekers Albums (Billboard)	20
