= Xen (album) =

2014 studio album by Arca

Studio album by Arca
- Released: 4 November 2014
- Recorded: 2014
- Genres: Electronic; experimental
- Length: 39:24
- Label: Mute
- Producer: Arca

Arca chronology
&&&&& (2013)	Xen (2014)	Sheep (2015)

Singles from Xen
- 1. "Thievery" Released: 30 September 2014; 2. "Now You Know" Released: 31 October 2014; 3. "Xen" Released: 17 November 2014; 4. "Sad Bitch" / "Wound" Released: 16 April 2015

Xen is the debut studio album by Venezuelan electronic musician Arca, released on 4 November 2014 through Mute Records. The album was recorded over a largely improvised six-month period in 2014.

== Background ==
The title of the album is a reference to Ghersi's "feminine spirit" as portrayed in the album artwork and videos. According to the artist, the designer Jesse Kanda asked "if I had a girl's name when I was a kid, I told him that I have this image in my head when I listen to a song of mine that I really love or that I feel happy with. I move really slowly in a very effeminate way [and] close my eyes and I see this naked being who exists in front of an audience. Everyone is simultaneously attracted to it and repulsed".

Upon reflection she felt that "Those were all projections of my psyche; of how I viewed my own sexuality and how I engaged with people through the lens of sensuality. Xen is an 'it'. I lean towards calling Xen 'her' in response to the fact that society historically leans towards men having more power. Me calling Xen 'her' is an equalisation of that." This is reflected in the video for the song "Thievery". Ghersi noted that the song-titles have little meaning except for "Failed" which was written about her then-boyfriend Daniel Sannwald.

== Critical reception ==
Professional ratings
Aggregate scores
Source	Rating
AnyDecentMusic?	7.8/10
Metacritic	79/100
Review scores
Source	Rating
AllMusic	4/5 stars
Consequence	A−
Mixmag	5/5
Mojo	3/5 stars
The Observer	4/5 stars
Pitchfork	8.4/10
Q	4/5 stars
Resident Advisor	3.5/5
Rolling Stone	3/5 stars
Uncut	8/10

At Metacritic, which assigns a normalized rating out of 100 to reviews from mainstream publications, the album received an average score of 79, based on 22 reviews, indicating "generally favorable reviews". AllMusic said "the way Arca plays with and decorates time, letting sounds and moods mutate spontaneously, makes Xen a complete picture of [her] artistry and also promises much more." Clash described the album as a "captivating, at times unexplainable reaching of pained highs and battered lows." Consequence stated that Arca's "time alongside Gesaffelstein added to [her] understanding of the space between beats, and the emotive power of these hesitations." The Observer said Xen is "one of those albums that elegantly restates the appeal of digital music, expressing hues and states of being that fall outside the analogue spectrum."

Pitchfork stated: "Taken as a whole, it is an album about unstable unities, things that cannot easily hold together, wholes breaking to pieces and being put back together again in new and unfamiliar shapes." PopMatters said: "This is uncompromising stuff, with little holding back, and the end effect is one that wears not just its heart, but its soul, on its sleeve." Resident Advisor said "Xen remains as singular–and often as brilliant–as the rest of the Arca catalogue." Fact wrote: "Even if [her] chops as a producer aren't in question, the writing on Xen is too patchy to fully realise Ghersi's ambitions. Still, it's hardly lacking in ideas."

== Track listing ==
All tracks are written by Alejandra Ghersi.

Standard edition
No.	Title	Length
1.	"Now You Know"	3:58
2.	"Held Apart"	1:20
3.	"Xen"	3:18
4.	"Sad Bitch"	1:55
5.	"Sisters"	2:21
6.	"Slit Thru"	2:12
7.	"Failed"	3:40
8.	"Family Violence"	2:13
9.	"Thievery"	2:33
10.	"Lonely Thugg"	2:56
11.	"Fish"	2:07
12.	"Wound"	2:09
13.	"Bullet Chained"	2:51
14.	"Tongue"	2:59
15.	"Promise"	2:52

Japanese bonus track
No.	Title	Length
16.	"Boyfriend"	3:43

Vinyl 10" side C
No.	Title	Length
1.	"Empath"	1:37
2.	"Get in the Fucking Car"	2:58
3.	"Snatch"	1:51
4.	"Vanity"	2:30

Vinyl 10" side D
No.	Title	Length
1.	"Dog Crying at Its Owner's Grave"	3:05

????? Edition bonus tracks
No.	Title	Length
16.	"????? A" ("Empath", "Get in the Fucking Car", "Snatch" and "Vanity")	9:08
17.	"????? B" ("Dog Crying at Its Owner's Grave")	2:21

== Charts ==
Chart (2014)	Peak position
Japanese Albums (Oricon)	109
US Top Dance Albums (Billboard)	8
US Heatseekers Albums (Billboard)	6
US Independent Albums (Billboard)	47
