= Thievery (song) =

2014 single by Arca

- Cover artwork for "Thievery" by Arca

Single by Arca

from the album Xen
- Released: September 11, 2014
- Genre: Experimental; electronic
- Length: 2:33
- Label: Mute
- Songwriter: Arca
- Producer: Arca

"Thievery" is a song by Venezuelan musician and producer Arca, unveiled by Mute Records on September 11, 2014, as the lead single from her debut studio album, Xen (2014). Arca wrote and produced the instrumental recording, which has a duration of two minutes and 33 seconds.

The recording is built around a slow, heavy breakbeat accompanied by synthesizer phrases and brief processed vocal sounds, with a staccato piano figure appearing near the end. The staff of Stereogum compared its pulse to dancehall, and Pitchfork album reviewer Philip Sherburne heard a reggaeton influence. Pitchfork designated "Thievery" a Best New Track upon its release and later placed it at number 85 on the publication's list of the 100 best tracks of 2014.

Visual artist Jesse Kanda created the song's computer-animated music video, which was released on September 30, 2014. It depicts Xen, a gender-ambiguous digital character associated with the album, dancing against a dark background while the character's body changes shape. The video appeared on year-end selections published by Pitchfork, Dazed, and Stereogum.

== Background and release ==
On September 11, 2014, Mute announced that it had signed Arca and introduced Xen in the same announcement, accompanied by "Thievery" as the album's first single. Pitchfork reported that Xen was scheduled for an international release on November 3, followed by its United States release on November 4.

Discussing the album's creation in an interview with The Fader, Arca described Xen as the result of a largely improvisatory process that lasted approximately six months. She recorded and mixed most of the material in a freestanding studio in the garden of her home in Dalston, London, using equipment that included Ableton Live and the iZotope Iris sampling synthesizer. Arca later told Dazed that she chose most of the titles on Xen spontaneously and rarely attached fixed explanations to them.

"Thievery" appears as the ninth track on the standard edition of Xen. In March 2015, a digital deluxe edition of the album was released with additional material that included the official videos for "Thievery" and the title track.

== Composition ==
"Thievery"
A sample from the song demonstrating the track’s synthesizer figures and processed vocal sounds.

"Thievery" is an instrumental experimental electronic track with a duration of two minutes and 33 seconds. Andrew Gaerig of Pitchfork described its central rhythm as a slow, heavy breakbeat surrounded by glassy synthesizer figures, with short processed vocal sounds appearing between them. He also noted abrupt bursts of noise and a plain staccato piano phrase that enters near the end of the recording.

The staff of Stereogum compared the track's staggered pulse to dancehall and described a push and pull between the beat and its keyboard figure. Gary Suarez of The Quietus called the song "dissonant reggaeton", and Sherburne identified a similar influence and considered "Thievery" the track on Xen that came closest to the form of a conventional single.

Heather Phares of AllMusic connected the song's prominent rhythm section to Arca's club-oriented productions, while characterizing the overall track as abstract and uncanny. Kitty Empire of The Observer likewise identified "Thievery" as the point on Xen that most clearly approached dance music. Writing for Pitchfork at the end of the year, Brandon Stosuy drew attention to the chopped vocal samples and chiming patterns, observing that a groove emerges despite the track's shifts in pace.

== Critical reception ==
Gaerig designated "Thievery" a Best New Track in his review for Pitchfork, praising what he called the arrangement's "interior logic" and arguing that its disparate sounds develop into a coherent progression. Laurence Day of The Line of Best Fit described the song as "darkly melodic" and characterized its electronic sounds as jittery. The Stereogum staff placed "Thievery" fifth on the publication's weekly songs list, where they praised its irregular pulse and the groove produced by the relationship between its rhythmic elements.

Reviews of Xen also drew attention to "Thievery" when discussing the album's approach to rhythm and dance music. Phares connected its large percussion sound to Arca's earlier club-oriented work, while Empire selected the track as the album's clearest approach to dance music. Suarez cited it in his discussion of Arca's treatment of established genres, describing the track in terms of reggaeton while placing it within the album's more dissonant musical language. Dazed, which included Xen among its 20 best albums of 2014, singled out the force of the song's breakbeat and bass.

At the end of 2014, Pitchfork ranked "Thievery" at number 85 on its list of the year's 100 best tracks. In the accompanying entry, Stosuy described it as one of the most immediately graspable pieces on Xen and praised the groove that persists beneath its unstable surface.

== Music video ==
Mute released the music video for "Thievery" on September 30, 2014, with Jesse Kanda credited as its creator and director. Kanda had previously collaborated with Arca on the visual presentation of the mixtape &&&&& and the multimedia project TRAUMA, and he also designed the imagery used for Xen.

The video depicts Xen as a nude, digitally rendered figure dancing against a dark background while the character's skin ripples, stretches, and twists with the movement. Vogue reported that Kanda produced the animation by mapping Arca's skeleton onto a three-dimensional model, a process that linked the character's dancing to Arca's own movements. Contemporary reports described the resulting body as gender-ambiguous.

Arca described Xen as a projection of her psyche and sexuality, regarding the character as a feminine presence and using feminine pronouns when discussing her. In an interview with The Guardian, she explained that the character's physical distortions gave visual form to emotion and associated the contortions with her own feelings of confusion. Thomas Gorton of Dazed interpreted Xen's fixed expression and forceful dancing as signs of confinement and disconnection.

Sasha Geffen examined the character's treatment of gender in an essay for Pitchfork, discussing its combination of differently gendered anatomical features and the indeterminate form assumed by its genital area. In the same piece, Kanda said that his visual work was informed by an interest in finding beauty in images that might initially appear repulsive.

Kanda later returned to the character for the music video for "Xen", which Stereogum described as a continuation of the imagery introduced in "Thievery". Both videos were included with the digital deluxe edition of the album.

== Accolades ==
Rankings for "Thievery" in 2014
Work	Publication	List	Rank	Ref.
Song	Stereogum	The 5 Best Songs of the Week	5	
Song	Pitchfork	The 100 Best Tracks of 2014	85	
Music video	Stereogum	The 5 Best Videos of the Week	2	
Music video	Pitchfork	The 20 Best Music Videos of 2014	Unranked	
Music video	Dazed	The Top 20 Music Videos of 2014	Unranked	
Music video	Stereogum	The 40 Best Music Videos of 2014	20	

== Credits and personnel ==
Credits are adapted from the liner notes of Xen, AllMusic, and the music-video credits.

- Arca – performance, composition, production
- Jesse Kanda – music video direction
