= Stretch 2 =

2012 EP by Arca

EP by Arca
- Released: 6 August 2012
- Genres: Electronic hip hop; trip hop
- Length: 26:45
- Label: UNO NYC
- Producer: Arca

Arca chronology
Stretch 1 (2012)	Stretch 2 (2012)	&&&&& (2013)

Stretch 2 is the third extended play by Venezuelan producer Arca. It was released on 6 August 2012 by UNO NYC, following its predecessor Stretch 1 in April.

== Composition ==
Primarily an electronic hip-hop album, Stretch 2 features avant-garde time signatures, warped pitches, and "a kind of post-millennial take on trip-hop with a debt to Aphex Twin", as well as influences from gangsta rap, garage, and new age.

== Critical reception ==
Professional ratings
Review scores
Source	Rating
Resident Advisor	3.5/5
Tiny Mix Tapes	4/5 marks

Andrew Ryce of Resident Advisor called Stretch 2 "a mood record, unforgivingly dark and antisocial" and that "Though [her] playful hip-hop vignettes are nice little curios, the album's real eye-openers are when [she] stretches out." Ryce praised the EP's "beautifully tortured production", use of harsh effects, and Arca's "sometimes (unsettlingly) legible" vocals. Birkut of Tiny Mix Tapes called the EP a "remarkable listen that’s constantly negotiating what constitutes fun and fear".

Accolades for Stretch 2
Publication	Accolade	Rank	Ref.
Tiny Mix Tapes	Favorite 50 Albums of 2012	45	

== Track listing ==
No.	Title	Length
1.	"Self Defense"	2:20
2.	"Fortune"	3:24
3.	"Maiden Voyage"	2:36
4.	"2 Blunted"	1:47
5.	"Tapped In"	2:34
6.	"Strung"	2:20
7.	"Brokeup"	2:52
8.	"Meditation"	4:11
9.	"Manners"	4:41
Total length:		26:45
