= Daniel Sannwald =

German photographer and director

Daniel Sannwald (born 1979) is a German photographer and director based in London.

== Education ==
Sannwald studied at the Royal Academy of Fine Arts in Antwerp.

== Career ==
Sannwald regularly contributes to fashion publications such as 032c, 10 Men, Arena Homme +, Dazed, i-D, Pop, V, British Vogue, Vogue Germany, Vogue Russia, Vogue Italia, Vogue Hommes Japan, and Teen Vogue.

Sannwald is known for his innovative approach to fashion photography. i-D wrote "Daniel Sannwald takes spellbinding pictures. An outstanding image-maker, his visionary techniques are paving the way forward for the next generation of fashion photographers. Daniel dreams up hyperreal, conceptual shoots which continually blend the existential line between fantasy and reality. His creative references are always complex, intelligent, intriguing and totally original, and his ascents to recognition has been steady and totally well-deserved."

In addition to his editorial work, Sannwald has photographed major advertising campaigns for brands including Nike, Adidas, Foot Locker, Hugo Boss, Camper and Stella McCartney.

Sannwald's work in the music industry includes directing music videos and shooting album covers for artists such as Arca, Kelela, John Legend, M.I.A., Miguel, Rihanna, Rosalía, SZA, Beyonce, Dua Lipa, and Travis Scott.

Sannwald's work has been exhibited in galleries and museums, including FOAM Fotografiemuseum in Amsterdam and the Hyères International Festival of Fashion and Photography.

In 2016, Sannwald established unu o unu, a non-profit organisation where several artists guide workshops to varying groups in society.

In 2018, he published a photo-book titled, featuring full bleed color photographs: Spektrum. Sleek-mag praised the book as "electrifying".

In 2023, Sannwald, alongside Ferran Echegaray, Viktor Hammarberg, Rosalía, and Pili Vila, won the Latin Grammy Award for Best Recording Package for his work on the album: Motomami by Rosalia.

He is represented by Management Artists.
