= Kick IIIII =

Studio album by Arca
- Released: 3 December 2021
- Recorded: 2018–2021
- Genres: Ambient; electronic; contemporary classical; avant-classical; electroacoustic
- Length: 41:43
- Languages: Spanish; English
- Label: XL
- Producer: Arca

Arca chronology
Kick IIII (2021)	Kick IIIII (2021)	Kick (2022)

Kick IIIII (stylized as kiCK iiiii) is the eighth studio album by Venezuelan record producer and singer Arca. The album was surprise released on 3 December 2021 as the fifth and final entry in the Kick quintet. The album was released with no singles or prior announcement.

== Background ==
Upon the release of Kick I, news surfaced that Arca would be releasing three more Kick albums to make a tetralogy. In an interview, she stated: "There will be four volumes. The third one is a little bit more introverted than Kick I, a little bit more like my self-titled album, I guess. The fourth one is piano only, no vocals. Right now, the least defined one, strangely, is the third one. It's all gestating right now [...] Each Kick exists in a kind of quantum state until the day that I send it to mastering. I try to not commit until I have to. But I have a vision for it. The second one is heavy on backbeats, vocal manipulation, mania, and craziness."

Kick IIIII would end up being similar to Arca's previous description of the fourth entry, focusing entirely on quieter ambient pieces, focused mainly on piano, plucked strings and swirling pads. Famed Japanese composer Ryuichi Sakamoto makes a guest vocal appearance on "Sanctuary".

== Critical reception ==
Professional ratings
Aggregate scores
Source	Rating
AnyDecentMusic?	7.7/10
Metacritic	77/100
Review scores
Source	Rating
AllMusic	4/5 stars
The A.V. Club	B−
Evening Standard	4/5 stars
Exclaim!	8/10
The Guardian	4/5 stars
The Line of Best Fit	8/10
Loud and Quiet	8/10
NME	4/5 stars
Pitchfork	7.8/10
The Skinny	4/5 stars

On review aggregate site Metacritic, Kick IIIII received a score of 77 out of 100, based on reviews from 13 critics, indicating "generally favorable reviews". Philip Sherburne of Pitchfork would find the album to be "the most understated" of the Kick series, likening it to "an Easter egg in a video game—a sparkly basket of jewels collected from the crevices of Arca’s more imposingly monumental works." The Guardian's Alexis Petridis called the album an Aphex Twin-inspired take on ambient music, stating that its "moments of blissed-out loveliness" were able to "coexist with disquiet".

Writing for NME, El Hunt opined that Kick IIIII was Kick's "most meandering" installment, fixating "on conjuring up an atmosphere, and living within it," while Safiya Hopfe of Exclaim! remarked that the work "signifies our landing on a planet where peace is possible" in the context of the series. Max Freedman of The A.V. Club gave a more mixed review, stating that it was "akin to the day after a snowstorm: There’s some beauty to it, but the unsightly ice piles curdling near the sidewalks stand out the most."

== Track listing ==
All tracks are written by Arca, except "Fireprayer", written by Arca and Sia.

No.	Title	Length
1.	"In the Face"	0:46
2.	"Pu"	2:35
3.	"Chiquito" (transl. Tiny)	3:07
4.	"Estrogen"	2:43
5.	"Ether"	4:04
6.	"Amrep"	2:55
7.	"Sanctuary" (featuring Ryuichi Sakamoto)	3:08
8.	"Tierno" (transl. Tender)	3:44
9.	"Músculos" (transl. Muscles)	5:21
10.	"La Infinita" (transl. The Infinite One)	4:49
11.	"Fireprayer"	3:54
12.	"Crown"	4:37
Total length:		41:43

Notes

- "Sanctuary" contains samples of previous Arca tracks "Ave María", "Gestation" and "La Exorcista", and interpolations of previous Arca tracks "Construct", "Diva" and "Alien Inside".
- "Fireprayer" contains samples of "Fire Meet Gasoline" (2014), written by Sia Furler, Samuel Dixon and Greg Kurstin and performed by Sia.

== See also ==
- María Lionza (statue)
