= Carlota Guerrero =

Spanish photographer

- Born: 1989 (age 35–36); Barcelona, Spain
- Years active: Photographer
- Website: carlotaguerrero.com

Carlota Guerrero (born 1989 in Barcelona) is a Spanish photographer, filmmaker, and art director known for exploring themes of femininity and bodily autonomy.

== Early life ==
Guerrero was born and raised in Barcelona. She took an interest in the visual arts during her adolescence but only started teaching herself photography in her early 20s after being gifted a camera by a friend.

== Career ==
Guerrero rose to fame in 2016 after Solange Knowles, discovered Guerrero's photography on her Instagram page and hired her to photograph the cover for A Seat at the Table and When I Get Home. They also collaborated on music videos. Other celebrities she has photographed are Penélope Cruz, Arca, Sita Abellan, and Rosalia, Emilia Clarke, and Rupi Kaur. She has also worked with brands and labels such as Dior, Nike, Paloma Wool, Givenchy, Mugler, and Helmut Lang. At Art Basel in 2019, Guerrero staged a performance emulating an orgy including 30 people in collaboration with Desigual. The performance was well-received. In 2021, her photo series Mujeres negras (Black Women) was exhibited at the National Art Museum of Catalonia. The pieces, which reflect on racism in Spain, feature Black models posed among marble sculptures at an art gallery. Proceeds were donated to refugee and immigrant women affected by structural racism. That year, she also published her first book, Tengo un Dragón Dentro del Corazón: la fotografía de Carlota Guerrero (I Have a Dragon Inside My Heart: Photography by Carlota Guerrero) with Prestel.
