= Entrañas =

2016 mixtape by Arca

Mixtape by Arca
- Released: 4 July 2016
- Genre: Deconstructed club
- Length: 25:02
- Producer: Arca

Arca chronology
Mutant (2015)	Entrañas (2016)	Arca (2017)

Singles from Entrañas
- 1. "Sin Rumbo" Released: 3 July 2016

Entrañas (transl. Entrails) is the third mixtape by Venezuelan electronic music producer Arca. It was released for free download on 4 July 2016 through Arca's SoundCloud page and MediaFire. It features contributions from Total Freedom, Masacooraman and Mica Levi, who is also known as Micachu. Even though 14 tracks are listed, the entire mixtape is in sequence as a single track.

The music video for the track, "Sin Rumbo", debuted one day prior to mixtape's release.

== Critical reception ==
Professional ratings
Review scores
Source	Rating
Consequence	B
Pitchfork	8.1/10
Resident Advisor	4/5
Tiny Mix Tapes	4.5/5 marks
Vice (Expert Witness)	A−

Upon release, Entrañas received universal acclaim from music critics. Consequence critic David Sackllah described the record as "purely visceral, constantly obliterating conventions" and thought "the underlying frenetic nature of Entrañas makes it all the more unsettling when the mix reaches its final track, the four-minute 'Sin Rumbo'." Philip Sherburne of Pitchfork, who considered the mixtape as "heavier and more unrelenting" than Arca's previous release, Mutant (2015), described it as a "quintessential Arca recording, commingling pleasure and terror and beauty and ugliness in the most thrilling ways possible."

=== Accolades ===
Publication	Accolade	Year	Rank	Ref.
Pitchfork	The 20 Best Experimental Albums of 2016	2016	—N/a	
Tiny Mix Tapes	2016: Favorite 50 Music Releases	2016	4	

== Track listing ==
All tracks are written by Alejandra Ghersi.

No.	Title	Length
1.	"Pérdida" (transl. Loss)	0:59
2.	"Torero" (transl. Bullfighter)	1:27
3.	"Culebra" (transl. Snake)	1:31
4.	"Vicar"	1:31
5.	"Cement Garden Interlude"	0:42
6.	"Baby Doll" (featuring Mica Levi)	2:30
7.	"Lulled"	1:51
8.	"Think Of" (featuring Mica Levi and Massacooraman)	2:38
9.	"Clocked"	0:39
10.	"Pargo" (transl. Snapper)	1:37
11.	"Turnt" (featuring Total Freedom)	0:25
12.	"Girasol" (transl. Sunflower)	2:26
13.	"Fount" (transl. Source)	2:28
14.	"Sin Rumbo" (transl. Aimless)	4:19
Total length:		25:02

Sample credits

- "Cement Garden Interlude" contains a sample of Charlotte Gainsbourg's speech from the 1993 film The Cement Garden.
- "Baby Doll" contains a sample of "Beatrix", written and performed by the Cocteau Twins from their 1984 album, Treasure.
- "Think Of" contains a sample of "Boyfriend", performed by Ashlee Simpson from her 2005 album I Am Me.

== Personnel ==
- Arca – performance, production
- Mica Levi – performance (tracks 6, 8)
- Massacooraman – performance (track 8)
- Total Freedom – performance (track 11)
- Jesse Kanda – artwork
