= Madre (EP) =

2021 EP by Arca

EP by Arca
- Released: 22 January 2021
- Length: 32:09
- Language: Spanish
- Label: XL
- Producer: Arca

Arca chronology
Kick I (2020)	Madre (2021)	Kick II (2021)

Madre (transl. "Mother") is an extended play by Venezuelan artist Arca. It was released on 22 January 2021 by XL Recordings. It includes the title track featuring Oliver Coates and three remixes by Arca. "Madre" was featured on an episode of the HBO teen drama Euphoria.

== Composition ==
Alejandra Ghersi, also known as Arca, wrote "Madre" in 2016. In 2018, a music video was filmed in collaboration with PRADA and SSENSE. This video had been edited and a now deleted snippet of the final video was uploaded. The original filming of the video, via cameras in the shooting location, was uploaded on youtube via SSENSE, featuring the track Tormenta playing on loop. The following year, Arca would have a similar shoot over 4 days titled Mutant;Faith. The Epilogue, titled Boundry, was released as Time on KiCk i. This EP is considered part of the KICK series, included in the official KICK spotify playlist between KiCk i and KICK ii.

She worked on the song for nine days, "playing very softly against it over and over in improvised strokes until a harmony and rhythm started to present itself, like a ghost orchestra at the back of a cathedral, barely raising above a whisper but also enveloping in terms of space and density." She played the cello for "Madreviolo" and destroyed the instrument immediately after, because "it had to be like a one-time thing for the version where I pitched up my vocal to castrati registers." She then brought on Oliver Coates to create an arrangement of the unprocessed a cappella version. Arca said that "with Oliver there was an insane resonance and chemistry; where he took it felt like the place I dreamed of but couldn't reach without him."

== Critical reception ==
Reviewing the first track, Isabelia Herrera of Pitchfork said "on the first track of her new maxi-single, cellist Oliver Coates' strings bloom into doleful tendrils and Arca's forlorn vocals curl into a delicate aria. But a closer listen reveals something far from the orchestral: the sense of capacious longing so central to boleros, tonadas, and other styles of Latin American folk music."

== Track listing ==
All tracks written and produced by Alejandra Ghersi, except for "Madre", co-written by Ghersi and Oliver Coates.

No.	Title	Length
1.	"Madre" (transl. "Mother") (with Oliver Coates)	9:00
2.	"Madreviolo" (transl. "Mother Viola")	7:09
3.	"Madre Acapella" (transl. "Mother Acappella")	8:53
4.	"Violo" (transl. "Viola")	7:07
Total length:		32:09

== Personnel ==
Credits adapted from Tidal.

- Arca – vocals, production, mixing
- Oliver Coates – arrangement (track 1)
- Enyang Urbiks – engineer (tracks 1–2)
- Alex Epton – mixing (tracks 1–2)
- Joe Lambert – engineer (tracks 3–4)
