= Arca (musician) =

Venezuelan musician (born 1989)

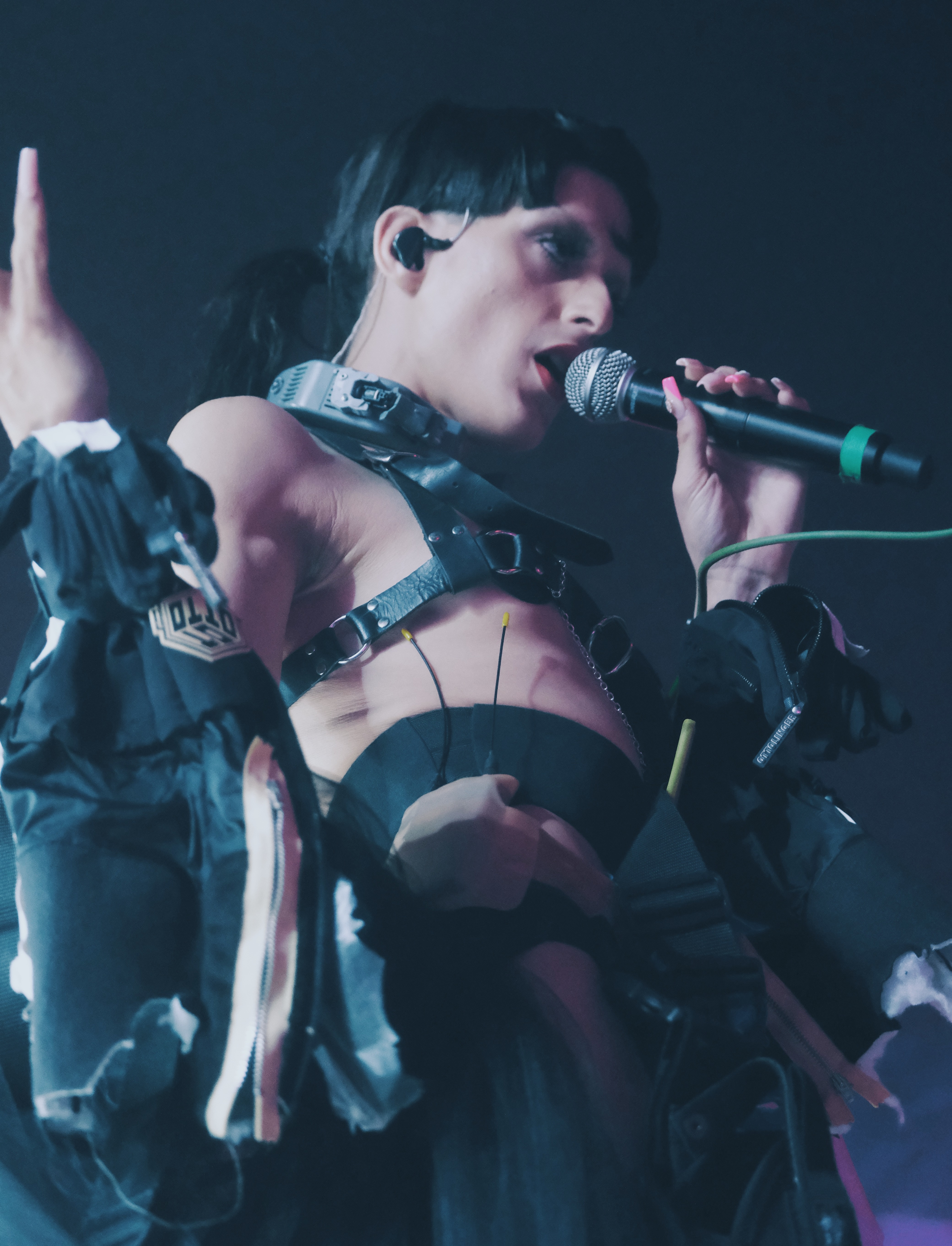
- Arca at Sónar in Barcelona, 2019
- Born: October 14, 1989 (age 37); Caracas, Venezuela
- Other name: Nuuro
- Citizenship: Venezuela
- Education: New York University
- Occupations: Musician; singer; composer; DJ; record producer; model; mixing engineer
- Years active: 2003-present
- Works: Discography
- Musical career
- Genres: Electronic; deconstructed club; experimental; IDM; industrial hip hop; avant-pop; alternative reggaeton
- Instrument: Vocals
- Labels: XL; Mute; Hippos in Tanks; UNO NYC; Poni Republic; Nang; Soundsister

Alejandra Ghersi Rodríguez (born October 14, 1989), known professionally as Arca, is a Venezuelan musician and record producer based in Barcelona, Spain. She (Note: Arca uses she/her and they/them pronouns. This article uses she/her for consistency.) initially began releasing music under the name of Nuuro. After attending the Clive Davis Institute of Recorded Music, Ghersi first released the EP Baron Libre (2012) under the name Arca and subsequently released the EPs Stretch 1 and Stretch 2; the latter experimented with hip hop and brought her attention from prominent music publications.

She released her first albums under the name Arca, Xen (2014) and Mutant (2015). Her third album, Arca (2017), became the first to prominently feature her vocals. From 2020 to 2021, Ghersi released the Kick quintet, starting with the album Kick I (2020) and ending with Kick IIIII (2021); these recordings drew from styles such as IDM, reggaeton, avant-pop, techno, and ambient. Her ninth studio album, XXXXX, was released in July 2026, five years after the conclusion of the Kick series. Ghersi has frequently incorporated themes related to gender identity, non-binary identification, and psychosexuality in her work, particularly after coming out in 2018.

Ghersi has also worked frequently with other artists as producer and collaborator. She received production credits on releases such as Kanye West's Yeezus (2013), FKA Twigs' EP2 (2013) and LP1 (2014), and Björk's Vulnicura (2015) and Utopia (2017). She has additionally contributed to music by artists such as Madonna, Kelela, the Weeknd, Frank Ocean, Planningtorock, Rosalía, Sia, Shygirl, Tinashe, and Lil Uzi Vert.

== Early life ==
Arca was born in Caracas as Alejandro Ghersi on October 14, 1989. Her father, Henrique Ghersi Rossón, is an investment banker and founder of VIP Capital (Venezuelan Investment Partners), an investment banking firm in Venezuela. She has an older brother whose music collection she would frequently listen to during her childhood.

The Ghersi family relocated to Darien, Connecticut when Ghersi was three years old, before returning to Caracas when she was nine years old. Ghersi described Darien as a "white picket fences" town with "deer and ticks". After returning to Caracas, Ghersi eventually began playing the friction drum and started producing electronic music on FL Studio. As an adolescent, she released music under the name Nuuro and received moderate popularity in her home country, with praise from national artists such as Los Amigos Invisibles. She collaborated with Venezuelan rock band La Vida Bohème, programming the synthesizers on their Grammy nominated album Nuestra. She later attended the Clive Davis Institute of Recorded Music at New York University.

== Career ==
=== 2012–2016: Production work, Stretch EPs, &&&&&, Xen, and Mutant ===
On 1 February 2012, Ghersi released her debut extended play (EP) as Arca, Baron Libre, through UNO NYC. Later that year, she released the Stretch 1 and Stretch 2 EPs on 19 April and 6 August respectively.

In 2013, she was credited for additional production, programming and songwriting for five of the songs on Kanye West's Yeezus, which was released on 18 June. Ghersi also served as one of the three production consultants. That same year on 23 July, she released her debut mixtape, &&&&& through SoundCloud and Hippos in Tanks. The project included an audio-visual performance alongside Jesse Kanda, who contributed the visuals, at MoMA PS1 in October 2014. On 17 September, FKA Twigs' EP2 was released on which Arca produced and co-wrote every song.

On 11 September 2014, it was announced that Arca had signed to the British record label Mute Records. The first release was the lead single "Thievery" from her then forthcoming debut studio album, Xen. On 31 October 2014, a second single "Now you know" with an accompanying music video, was released. The album Xen was released on 4 November 2014 on Mute Records.

Arca made significant contributions to Björk's eighth studio album Vulnicura which was released on 20 January 2015. She was credited as the co-producer for seven of the tracks, and the co-writer of two. According to Ghersi, the two began collaborating after her manager sent &&&&& to Björk's team, and the musician contacted her through email.

Ghersi collaborated with American singer Kelela on her Hallucinogen EP, which was released in October 2015. She was credited with producing, recording, mixing and co-writing two tracks, including the title track, which is an instrumental from &&&&& with Kelela adding improvised vocals.

On 20 November 2015, Arca released her second studio album, Mutant. She released the Entrañas mixtape on 4 July 2016, following the single "Sin Rumbo".

=== 2017–2024: Arca and Kick series ===
On 22 February 2017, Arca signed with XL Recordings and released "Piel", the lead single from the eponymous third studio album, Arca. The track was noted for featuring Ghersi singing which many reviewers considered a contrast from her older works. The release of Arca was preceded by three more singles: "Anoche", "Reverie" and "Saunter". Arca was released on 7 April 2017 via XL Recordings to widespread acclaim from music critics and was featured on numerous year-end lists. To promote the album, a music video for "Desafío" was released while "Saunter" and "Reverie" were released as 12-inch singles.

Later in 2017, Arca collaborated with Björk again on her ninth studio album Utopia, producing the majority of the tracks. Björk explained that the album explored "the Arca-Björk overlap". A music video featuring Arca for "Arisen My Senses" was released on 18 December 2017. Arca also collaborated with Kelela on her debut studio album, Take Me Apart, released in October 2017. Kelela said she "anchored" the album and produced a bulk of it. She is credited for producing on four tracks, and co-writing two.

In September 2019, Arca held a series of performances at New York City cultural venue The Shed during a live shoot for a "yet-to-be released project". The series, titled "Mutant;Faith" was held from 25 September - 28 September and consisted of four acts. It was noted by fashion magazines Vogue's Rachel Hahn and Paper's Matt Moen for its improvised nature while the latter also noticed the interactive element of the performances. The performances featured guest appearances from Björk and American actor Oscar Isaac.

On 19 February 2020, Arca released a 62-minute single named "@@@@@" along with an audiovisual directed by Frederik Heyman. The track was released on XL Recordings on 21 February. Along with the single, 13 international tour dates were announced for Spring 2020. Her fourth album Kick I, featuring Björk, Rosalía, Shygirl and Sophie, was announced on 8 March 2020 as part of an anthology and released on 26 June 2020; for this album Arca was nominated to the Grammys 2021. On 2 April, Arca had a 6 hour long Twitch stream with a DJ mix named "^^^^^ (Circumflex)", which later premiered on NTS radio on 2 May. In July 2020, it was announced that a reissue of &&&&& would be released and the track "Knot" was released as the lead single. The mixtape was reissued to celebrate the anniversary of Berlin based experimental label PAN. In September 2021, Arca's remix of "Rain on Me" by Lady Gaga and Ariana Grande, which samples the songs "Time" and "Mequetrefe" from Kick I, was released as part of Gaga's remix album Dawn of Chromatica.

On 24 June 2021, Arca showcased a seven track extended play (EP) named "Issued by Bottega", and was only available on Bottega Veneta 2021 Digital Journal. The follow-up albums to Kick I, titled Kick II, Kick III and Kick IIII, were originally scheduled to be released on December 3, 2021. However, starting with Kick II on 30 November, albums were released in sequence within that week. A fifth instalment, Kick IIIII, was released "as a surprise" on 3 December. Arca co-produced the track "Tears in the Club" by FKA Twigs featuring Canadian singer the Weeknd, which was released later that month as the lead single for FKA Twigs' mixtape Caprisongs. Arca also produced the track "Thank You Song" by FKA Twigs, the closing track from the same mixtape.

Arca appears briefly in a video interlude during Beyoncé's Renaissance World Tour. On 8 June 2023, she made a surprise appearance opening for Beyoncé at her Barcelona show. In 2023, she supported Madonna's Celebration Tour.

In September 2024, Arca teamed up with the Dominican rapper Tokischa to release the one-off single "Chama". In November 2024, Arca produced a remix of "Aquamarine" by Addison Rae titled "Arcamarine". The remix was released alongside a music video. The pair performed the song live at Ghersi's Coachella 2025 set. Following this remix, Arca also collaborated with Hikaru Utada on a remix of their song "Electricity".

=== 2025-present: XXXXX ===
In 2025, Arca released the double single "Puta/Sola". In 2026, Arca contributed additional production to the tracks "I Feel So Free" and "The Test" off Madonna's Confessions II. She also appeared in Madonna's film Confessions II – The Film. The same year, she also released a remix of Robyn's track "Sexistential". On 31 July 2026, Arca released XXXXX through XL Recordings, her first full-length project in five years and the follow-up to the Kick series. The 16-track album was preceded by a livestreamed performance titled Diva.Experimental, directed by Daniel Sannwald and broadcast from seven locations in Barcelona.

Arca on a cover of the Autumn/Winter 2026 issue of AnOther Magazine, photographed by Anders Edström

In September 2026, Arca appeared on a cover of the Autumn/Winter 2026 issue of AnOther Magazine, published during the magazine's 25th anniversary. The accompanying feature, photographed by Anders Edström and styled by Akeem Smith, included an interview with Connor Garel in which Arca discussed the making of XXXXX, the period following the Kick albums, her approach to psychoanalysis and creativity, and recording sessions with Madonna. Some of the photographs also used flexible LED screens designed by HongJi Yan, including pieces made for Arca that displayed images of her face across the screens.

== Artistry ==
=== Musical style and lyrical themes ===
Ghersi's work published under the Arca name has been labelled as experimental music, hip-hop, and IDM, while her music released under Nuuro has been described as "electronic indie pop" and "dreamy synth-pop". She frequently incorporates themes of psychosexuality, science fiction and gender identity into her music.

Ghersi's music as Arca has been compared to the music of British electronic producer Aphex Twin while the eponymous album Arca (2017) was compared to compositions by German composers Robert Schumann and Felix Mendelssohn. The latter is known for being her first album as Arca to prominently incorporate lyricism. Stretch 1 and Stretch 2 which were released in 2012, have been compared to hip hop and club music. Reviewing Mutant (2015), Mark Richardson retrospectively compared Xen (2014) to classical music while the former leaned "toward soundscape". Xen was noted by The Quietus' Gary Suarez to contain themes of gender and sexuality which were opined to be mainly implicit through the album's music videos. Kick I (2020) has been considered avant-pop while reggaeton was a prominent genre featured, on Kick II (2021). Kick III (2021) has been noted of its influences of IDM while Kick IIIII (2021) has been dubbed ambient techno music. Kick IIIII (2021) has been dubbed "dark electronica" music by Joe Goggins of DIY. Reviewing XXXXX (2026), Shaad D'Souza of The Guardian described the album as combining elements of classical composition, deconstructed club, and pop music. He also noted similarities to the frenetic music of Aphex Twin and a footwork influence on "Fxck".

While accepting her British Dance Act award at the Brit Awards 2025, Charli XCX shouted Arca out in her speech, among other dance acts she had been influenced by.

=== Influences ===
During her childhood, Ghersi cites her brother's music collection as heavily influencing her. His collection included Aphex Twin, Squarepusher and Björk. The American composer and electronic musician Wendy Carlos has also been a major influence.

According to Ghersi, Björk inspired her to use her voice prominently on her eponymous third studio album, and also helped her "find" her voice, following the development of a creative partnership between the pair. She has also cited her love for pop music which influenced the making of Kick I. Arca also cites Madonna as an influence, saying: "I don't know if I can overstate how major Madonna's music and persona were in my household".

She cited German composer Richard Wagner's Der Ring des Nibelungen as a primary inspiration for the Kick series and called nightclubs the place she found a "home". Remezcla's Alberto De La Roza noted the influence of reggaeton on Ghersi's work.

=== Visuals ===
From 2012 to 2018, Ghersi often collaborated with Jesse Kanda on the visual aspect of her albums. He created the album artwork for her albums Xen (2014), Mutant (2015) and Arca (2017). She also collaborated with German photographer and director Daniel Sannwald to create her music videos.

For the Kick series, Frederik Heyman created the album artwork for all of the albums except for Kick I, which was created by her, Catalan artist Carlota Guerrero and Spanish multimedia artist Carlos Sáez.

Ghersi's visuals for covers, music videos and packaging are, at times, sexually explicit or intentionally unsettling. In particular, the imagery featured in the artwork for Ghersi's single "Vanity" and the music video for her single "Thievery" were marked as NSFW, the former of which, resulted in a temporary ban on her Instagram account. Arca's music video for "Reverie" (directed by Jesse Kanda) is age-restricted on YouTube for its graphic, violent imagery and sexual content.

Ghersi later developed a painting practice alongside her musical and visual work. In April 2026, her Angels series was exhibited at the Institute of Contemporary Arts (ICA) in London, in what The Guardian described as her first institutional exhibition. The paintings were created using materials including oil and acrylic paint, spray paint, marker, glitter, latex and melted plastic. Ghersi said she had begun painting while experiencing burnout from music and as a way of reconnecting with her earlier creative enthusiasm.

=== Mutants1000000 community ===
In March 2020, Arca launched a private Discord server named "Mutants1000000", which quickly evolved into a self-governing creative collective of fans, artists, and collaborators. In May and June 2020, the community mobilized to release the first volumes of the Mutants Mixtape series, a collection of collaborative charity albums raising funds for queer, trans, and racial justice organizations.

== Personal life ==
Arca came out as non-binary in 2018, later adding that she identifies as a trans woman, and goes by she/her and it/its pronouns. As of 2022, Arca has stated on her Instagram bio that she also uses they/them pronouns. In 2020, she stated in an interview for Vice: "I see my gender identity as non-binary, and I identify as a trans Latina woman, and yet, I don't want to encourage anyone to think that my gayness has been banished. And when I talk about gayness, it's funny because I'm not thinking about who I'm attracted to. It's a form of cultural production that is individual and collective, which I don't ever want to renounce". In May 2023, Arca underwent facial feminization surgery. She commented on the surgery, by stating that she "feel[s] so free after [it], like a load was lifted from [her] chakras".

Arca lived in London and resides in Barcelona as of 2018. She dated Daniel Sannwald, and later the Spanish multimedia artist Carlos Sáez, who has often collaborated in the realization of her projects. The song "Failed" is written about her relationship with Sannwald while the song "Calor" chronicles her relationship with Sáez.

In 2022, Arca signed the Musicians For Palestine pledge, refusing to perform in Israel following the 2021 Israel–Palestine crisis. In September 2025, Arca joined the No Music For Genocide boycott to geo-block her music from all music streaming platforms in Israel in protest of the Gaza genocide.

== Discography ==
- Xen (2014)
- Mutant (2015)
- Arca (2017)
- Kick I (2020)
- Kick II (2021)
- Kick III (2021)
- Kick IIII (2021)
- Kick IIIII (2021)
- XXXXX (2026)

== Awards and nominations ==
Award	Year	Category	Nominated work	Result	Ref.
AIM Independent Music Awards	2016	Independent Album of the Year	Mutant	Nominated	
Best Art Vinyl	2020	Best Vinyl Art	Kick I	Nominated	
Berlin Music Video Awards	2022	Best Editor	"Cayó"	Nominated	
GLAAD Media Awards	2021	Outstanding Breakthrough Music Artist	Kick I	Nominated	
Grammy Awards	2021	Best Dance/Electronic Album	Kick I	Nominated	
Latin Grammy Awards	2021	Best Alternative Music Album	Kick I	Nominated	
Latin Grammy Awards	2022	Best Alternative Music Album	Kick II	Nominated	
Libera Awards	2018	Best Outlier Album	Arca	Nominated	
Libera Awards	2018	Video of the Year	"Reverie"	Nominated	
Libera Awards	2021	Best Dance/Electronic Record	Kick I	Nominated	
Libera Awards	2021	Best Live/Livestream Act	Herself	Nominated	
Libera Awards	2022	Best Latin Record	Kick II	Nominated	
Libera Awards	2022	Best Electronic Record	Kick III	Nominated	
Libera Awards	2026	Best Latin Record	"Sola"	Nominated	
m-v-f- Awards	2023	Best Music Video	"Prada/Rakata"	Nominated	
m-v-f- Awards	2023	Audience Choice	"Prada/Rakata"	Won	
m-v-f- Awards	2023	Best Animation	"Prada/Rakata"	Nominated	
NME Awards	2022	Best Producer	Herself	Nominated	
Rober Award Music Prize	2014	Best Promotional Video	Trauma	Nominated	
Rober Award Music Prize	2014	Best Latin Artist	Herself	Nominated	
Rober Award Music Prize	2014	Best Electronic Music Artist	Herself	Nominated	
Rober Award Music Prize	2015	Best Electronic Music Artist	Herself	Nominated	
Rober Award Music Prize	2017	Best Electronic Music Artist	Herself	Nominated	
Rolling Stone en Español Awards	2023	Music Producer of the Year	Herself	Nominated	
UK Music Video Awards	2022	Best Dance/Electronic Video - International	"Prada/Rakata"	Won	
UK Music Video Awards	2022	Best Visual Effects in a Video	"Prada/Rakata"	Nominated	
UK Music Video Awards	2026	Best Live Video	XXXXX	Pending	
