= Arca (album) =

2017 studio album by Arca

Studio album by Arca
- Released: 7 April 2017
- Genres: Experimental; art pop
- Length: 43:17
- Language: Spanish
- Label: XL
- Producer: Arca

Arca chronology
Entrañas (2016)	Arca (2017)	Kick I (2020)

Singles from Arca
- 1. "Urchin" Released: 29 December 2015; 2. "Piel" Released: 22 February 2017; 3. "Anoche" Released: 24 February 2017; 4. "Reverie" Released: 16 March 2017; 5. "Saunter" Released: 24 March 2017; 6. "Desafío" Released: 10 April 2017

Arca is the third studio album by Venezuelan musician Arca, released on 7 April 2017 by XL Recordings, Arca's first release with the label. It is the first studio album to feature lead vocals by Arca herself, (Note: Arca uses she/her, it/its and they/them pronouns. This article uses she/her pronouns for consistency.) sung in her native language of Spanish. It was released to universal acclaim from critics.

== Background ==
On 28 February 2016, Ghersi announced via Instagram that her new album would be titled Reverie and was almost finished, although on 22 February 2017, she announced that the album would in fact be self-titled Arca. She explained in an interview for i-D magazine that she didn't want the album to be eponymous, it's more that every other name felt wrong: "I went through a whole year of trying different names, they all felt foreign. But because I use my singing voice in a way that I've never done before, it didn't feel unnatural to call it Arca."

The use of her voice on the new album was inspired by collaborator and friend, Björk:

I don't know if I would've ever sung on this record if it weren't for Björk. We were in the car together and I had been singing for fun and she turned to me very casually and asked me if I'd ever considered singing on my music. I just dismissed it. But then I took her very seriously because I respect her so profoundly as a vocalist. She gave me so much guidance, so I really want to celebrate that when I talk about the record. It was a big deal. She was so nurturing throughout the whole process and I don't know if I would've been so brave to do this without her as a friend.

Ghersi explained her reasoning for singing in Spanish as it being the language she learned to process emotion with and the language of her upbringing that her parents "fought and divorced in". She said it became much more natural for her to manifest certain things that were very private and very intimate in Spanish.

Ghersi said the lyrics on the album are "all recent and all – except for one song – improvised" and that she "never sat down and wrote a word and then changed it to a better word," further stating: "I recorded lots and lots of melodies and lyrics, if they were pure enough I left them like that. I didn't let my critical mind interrupt the outpouring." Many songs include references to her influences, such as the lyrics of "Anoche", which reference Björk's 1995 song "I Miss You" and some of the lyrics of "Reverie" which are taken directly from the Venezuelan folk classic "Caballo Viejo", composed by Simón Díaz.

== Release and promotion ==
Ghersi announced the album's title and release date via Twitter along with the opening track off the album, "Piel" on 22 February 2017. The track listing includes the previously shared "Sin Rumbo", which appeared on her previous release, Entrañas and "Urchin", which was released on 29 December 2015. On 24 February, she released the second track, "Anoche" along with a music video directed by longtime collaborator Jesse Kanda, who also designed the cover art of the album. Billboard listed Kanda's cover art as one of the worst of 2017. On March 16, Ghersi released another video directed by Kanda for "Reverie". On March 24, "Saunter" was released. In addition, "Saunter" and "Reverie" were released on a limited run of 12-inch singles along with the album's release. On April 10, she released a music video for the tenth track, "Desafío".

== Critical reception ==
Professional ratings
Aggregate scores
Source	Rating
AnyDecentMusic?	8.2/10
Metacritic	87/100
Review scores
Source	Rating
AllMusic	5/5 stars
The A.V. Club	A−
Consequence	B+
Financial Times	4/5 stars
The Guardian	5/5 stars
Mixmag	8/10
Pitchfork	8.5/10
Q	4/5 stars
Resident Advisor	4.3/5
Uncut	8/10

At Metacritic, which assigns a normalized rating out of 100 to reviews from critics, the album received an average score of 87, based on 20 reviews, indicating "universal acclaim". AllMusic's Heather Phares praised Ghersi for pushing her boundaries on Arca, further stating that "the vulnerability [she] displays makes it some of [her] most exciting and moving music yet." Nina Corcoran of The A.V. Club praised the album, stating: "If the skittering fluctuation of Ghersi's past releases gained [her] a cult following, then the open-hearted ballads sprinkled throughout Arca should earn [Arca her] well-deserved breakthrough." Clash magazine critic Shahzaib Hussain thought that Arca "rides a steady stream of minimalist melancholia, juxtaposed against Ghersi’s intense, operatic vocals – the effect is one of ceremonial transcendence." Consequence's David Sackllah described the album as Arca's "most daring and enthralling record yet," adding that "By peeling back the layers of [her] persona, Ghersi breaks [herself] down in an attempt to find rebirth, trying to reconcile with [her] past and present." Bryon Hayes of Exclaim! said, "This back-and-forth is carried along throughout Arca, demonstrating that Ghersi hasn't lost [her] fondness for tempered electronic cacophony, but has expanded [her] palette, to mind-bendingly gorgeous results."

Fact critic Miles Bowe praised the album's composition, claiming it's Ghersi's "most focused on [her] career" while noting that the vocals display her forward evolution. Rating the album with a perfect score, The Guardian's Rachel Aroesti commented: "Exquisite opener 'Piel' captures the interplay between poise and prostration that has made Catholic ritual such a rich artistic seam, while arch humour is provided by 'Whip' – hyper-real lashing accompanied by the sound of a powering-down robot – and 'Desafío', which takes disposable Eurotrash pop and makes it worthy of pious contemplation." Pitchfork critic Kevin Lozano labeled the record with the tag "Best New Music", mentioning that Ghersi's work is "still mysterious, but not as opaque—it doesn't keep you at an arm's length, instead [she] offers up [her] pleasures more readily." Resident Advisor's Ryan Keeling described the record as "Arca's most accomplished work to date." Andrew Paschal of PopMatters thought that the record "refuses to ossify into a legible and easily recognizable shape, defying our expectations of the artist’s output while remaining untethered even to a clearly delineated internal logic," describing the result as "both emotionally enrapturing and conceptually thrilling." Andy Beta of Spin praised Arca for being Ghersi's "most engaging, emotionally draining and confrontational album to date."

=== Accolades ===
Publication	Accolade	Rank	Ref.
AllMusic	Best Albums of 2017	—N/a	
AllMusic	Favorite Electronic Albums of 2017	—N/a	
Clash	Albums of the Year 2017	10	
Consequence	Top 50 Albums of 2017	16	
Crack Magazine	Top 100 albums of 2017	1	
Dazed	The 20 Best Albums of 2017	1	
Highsnobiety	25 Best Albums of 2017	20	
Les Inrockuptibles	100 Best Albums of 2017	22	
Loud and Quiet	Top 40 Albums of 2017	25	
Mixmag	Top 50 Albums of 2017	7	
Noisey	The 100 Best Albums of 2017	16	
Noisey	The 100 Best Albums of the 2010s	26	
Pitchfork	The 50 Best Albums of 2017	21	
Pitchfork	The 20 Best Experimental Albums of 2017	1	
Pitchfork	The 200 Best Albums of the 2010s	61	
PopMatters	The 60 Best Albums of 2017	22	
Resident Advisor	Best Albums of 2017	—N/a	
Rolling Stone	20 Best EDM and Electronic Albums of 2017	9	
Sputnikmusic	Top 50 Albums of 2017	18	
The Vinyl Factory	50 Favorite Albums of 2017	42	
The Quietus	Albums of the Year 2017	32	
Time Out New York	The Best Albums of 2017	10	
Tiny Mix Tapes	Favorite 50 Music Releases of 2017	3	
Uncut	75 Best Albums of 2017	39	

== Track listing ==
All tracks are written and produced by Alejandra Ghersi.

Standard edition
No.	Title	Length
1.	"Piel" (transl. "Skin")	4:07
2.	"Anoche" (transl. "Last Night")	3:36
3.	"Saunter"	2:09
4.	"Urchin"	4:00
5.	"Reverie"	3:12
6.	"Castration"	3:21
7.	"Sin Rumbo" (transl. "Aimlessly")	3:35
8.	"Coraje" (transl. "Courage")	4:31
9.	"Whip"	1:20
10.	"Desafío" (transl. "Challenge")	3:53
11.	"Fugaces" (transl. "Fleeting")	3:07
12.	"Miel" (transl. "Honey")	2:56
13.	"Child"	3:23
Total length:		43:17

Japanese edition (bonus track)
No.	Title	Length
14.	"Saunter" (reprise)	4:59
Total length:		48:16

== Personnel ==
Credits adapted from AllMusic.

- Arca – vocals, production, composition, mixing, programming, instrumentation
- Matt Colton – mastering
- Jesse Kanda – artwork

== Charts ==
Chart (2017)	Peak position
Belgian Albums (Ultratop Flanders)	46
Spanish Albums (PROMUSICAE)	87
US Heatseekers Albums (Billboard)	18
US Independent Albums (Billboard)	50
