= Deconstructed club =

Experimental electronic music genre

- Stylistic origins: Electronic dance music; industrial; Jersey club; footwork; ballroom; grime; techno; house; avant-garde
- Cultural origins: Late 2000s, New York, United States

Other topics
- Intelligent dance music; post-Internet music

Deconstructed club, also known as post-club or deconstructed music, is an experimental style of electronic dance music characterized by a post-modernist approach and an abrasive or dystopian tone. It stands opposed to the tropes of mainstream club styles, often dispensing with four-on-the-floor beats and stable rhythm while mixing eclectic sources, including grime, Jersey club, industrial, techno, rap, ballroom, and footwork.

== Characteristics ==
Deconstructed club departs from the tropes of traditional and mainstream dance music, such as four on the floor beats, stable tempos, build-ups, and drops. Instead, it is identified by an aggressive, frantic, post-industrial sound design drawing from multiple genres and featuring metallic or staccato sounds such as samples of glass smashing or gunshots. It incorporates a wide dynamic tempo range and disparate elements such as jersey club kick-patterns, grime claps, ballroom samples, jittery footwork production, field recordings, rapping, house, techno, and industrial textures. It aims for an excessive, apocalyptic-sounding soundscape, with frequent rhythmic switch-ups and atonality. In addition, tracks delve into experimental soundscapes and alternating atmospheric breathers. The genre's ethos and ideas are decidedly post-structuralist towards conventional music production and dance music.

In Latin America, deconstructed club is often influenced by Latin American and Afro-Caribbean sounds like reggaeton, baile funk, dancehall, and trival. The label NAAFI in Mexico has numerous artists who mix genres such as trival and reggaeton to reformulate deconstructed club music.

== History ==
=== Origins ===
The style was chiefly sparked by a New York dance night named GHE20G0TH1K, which was started in 2009 by DJs Venus X and Shayne Oliver. These parties featured voguers, punks, and fashionista, took place in warehouses across Brooklyn and Manhattan and started to radicalize the city's nightclub scene within a year. The style that defined the deconstructed club movement was directly shaped by the possibilities of CDJs and inspired producers to imitate this chaotic experimentation in their own music. The MP3s used by DJs on GHE20G0TH1K had a crunchy, cruddy texture while being played on a big sound system, which came to define their aesthetic. Because of deconstructed club's relationship to vogue and prominent LGBTQ originators, the genre's identity is tied to the underground party scene in NYC and alternative queer nightlife. Musicians such as Arca and Chino Amobi attended these parties.

Artists from the labels Night Slugs, Fade to Mind, and Keysound, who mixed together rebooted ballroom/vogue house, Jersey club, and the new wave of instrumental grime with a stark, hi-tech machine sheen are also cited by Adam Harper writing in The Fader as pioneers of the genre. The term itself started circulating in the mid-2010s and was used as an umbrella term to describe a disparate, international genus of producers pushing the limits or boundaries of club music and tapping into the avant-garde.

=== Notable releases ===
The Jam City album Classical Curves (2012), released by Night Slugs, was a pioneering release in the deconstructed club scene, decontextualizing elements of Detroit house, grime, Jersey club, and synth-funk into abstract new forms; Resident Advisor later described it as the scene's "most complete statement", calling it "highly conceptual, barely danceable, yet endlessly charming". UK musician Sophie was credited with producing pioneering work in deconstructed club and bubblegum bass music during the 2010s, influencing mainstream artists such as Charli XCX. Arca drew influence from the GHE20GOTH1K scene on deconstructed club releases such as &&&&& (2013), Sheep (2014), and Entrañas (2016).

== Visual art ==
The music is often accompanied by music videos with visual art. Some of the artists studied visual arts rather than music. The visuals are often abstract and feature mutational, grotesque, and decomposing forms. This cross between the visuals and experimental electronic music has become so prominent that one of the key labels in the genre, PAN, has launched an imprint, "Entopia", dedicated to producing soundtracks for art installations, films, theater works, dance, and fashion podiums.

== Reception ==
The music journalist and critic Simon Reynolds called the style conceptronica and said that "it isn't a genre as such, but more like a mode of artistic operation". He contrasted the genre with 1990s IDM, saying that early IDM from those like Aphex Twin or Luke Vibert tended to be more down-to-earth, relaxing, and rife with juvenile humor, rather than demanding and intellectually charged.
