= &&&&& =

Mixtape by Arca
- Released: July 23, 2013
- Genre: Deconstructed club
- Length: 25:34
- Labels: Self-released; Hippos in Tanks; PAN
- Producer: Arca

Arca chronology
Stretch 2 (2012)	&&&&& (2013)	Xen (2014)

Limited vinyl cover (2014) and new vinyl and streaming cover for reissue (2020)

Singles from &&&&&
- 1. "Knot" Released: July 29, 2020

&&&&& (pronounced "ampersand") is the debut mixtape by Venezuelan electronic producer Arca. It was released on 23 July 2013 through Hippos in Tanks on SoundCloud. Even though 14 tracks are listed, the entire mixtape is in sequence as a single track. A vinyl release of the mixtape with an alternative album cover was released in January 2014 and was limited to 500 copies. On 28 July 2020, Arca announced a re-release of &&&&& through PAN, making the mixtape available on mainstream streaming platforms for the first time on 18 September 2020.

== Composition ==
&&&&& is an experimental electronic record with influences of dub, hip-hop, grime, ambient music, trap, and glitch. Stereogum described the record as "even darker and denser" than Arca's two previous Stretch EPs.

== Critical reception ==
Professional ratings
Review scores
Source	Rating
No Ripcord	8/10
Pitchfork	8.4/10
Tiny Mix Tapes	4.5/5 marks

&&&&& received critical acclaim from music critics. Tiny Mix Tapes says the mixtape "has the potential to conjure an emotional frenzy that's alluring to the senses in a way that so much electronic artistry fails to even approach." No Ripcord praised the mixtape for "its density, its intensity, its I'm-lost-in-a-big-city feel, its warm gust of beats blowing while the subway comes squeaking into the station, its darkness, its late-night ecstasy, its rawness, its rawness like raw milk, like drinking raw milk or eating sushi in an inexpensive restaurant somewhere on a street with trash and tweakers, its little motifs that twinkle like stars or Christmas lights, its muscular compactness." In a review of the reissue, Pitchfork said that "there's something a bit melancholy about listening to &&&&& now—the feeling that instead of freeing us from the past, technology has left us stuck in a loop, endlessly refreshing in search of a better world that never arrives, but that we can still dream of in our art."

The album was eventually sent to Icelandic musician Björk's management, leading to the two artists collaborating on her eighth studio album Vulnicura.

== Track listing ==
All tracks are written by Arca.

No.	Title	Length
1.	"Knot"	2:13
2.	"Harness"	1:53
3.	"Fossil"	1:50
4.	"Feminine"	0:35
5.	"Anaesthetic"	2:09
6.	"Coin"	2:15
7.	"Century"	1:15
8.	"Mother"	1:15
9.	"Hallucinogen"	2:06
10.	"Pinch"	1:37
11.	"DM True"	2:19
12.	"Waste"	2:34
13.	"Pure Anna"	0:47
14.	"Obelisk"	2:47
Total length:		25:34

== Personnel ==
- Arca – production
- Jesse Kanda – artwork

== Charts ==
Chart performance for &&&&&
Chart (2020)	Peak position
UK Independent Album Breakers (Official Charts Company)	19
