= Jesse Kanda =

Japanese-Canadian musician (born 1987)

- Born: June 23, 1987 (age 39); Kanagawa, Japan
- Known for: Visual arts; digital art; animation; sculpture; photography
- Musical career
- Also known as: Doon Kanda
- Genres: Electronic; experimental; ambient; abstract
- Occupations: Musician; producer
- Years active: 2017–present
- Label: Hyperdub
- Website: jessekanda.com

Jesse Kanda (born June 23, 1987), also known by his stage name Doon Kanda, is an artist, animator and musician based in London. Besides his solo career, he has collaborated with musicians including Arca, FKA Twigs and Björk.

== Early life ==
Kanda was born and partly grew up in Japan and raised in Canada. Since the age of 13, he has shared his work online with the advent of artistic social networks deviantArt.com and mp3.com in the early 2000s. He met musician Arca "on a DeviantArt forum when Kanda was 15 and Arca was 13."

== Artistic career ==
Common themes in Kanda's work have been growth, decay, death, freedom, fantasy, empathy, dream, innocence, subconscious, sexuality, sensuality, pain, suffering, euphoria, the body, movement, and magic. Kanda often employs a balance of aesthetic beauty and the grotesque. Juxtaposing life and death; or love and fear. Although he is mostly known for his sculptural mixed media images, animations and music, he has also ventured into traditional filmmaking, sculpture, fashion, painting and photography. His figures often exist in a dream-like spatial environment, often disfigured but with a sense of empathy and strength. His visual works are sometimes inspired by internal body parts, and Kanda admits: "The inside of our body is much more beautiful than the skin that coats it, yet we're afraid of it." He transforms painful organ-looking heuristics into aesthetic visual pieces.

HKanda has often used the music video as his artistic medium, either creating the music himself, or collaborating. In 2020, he provided visuals for beauty company Byredo. He has also provided visuals for fashion label Hood By Air.

== Awards ==
Kanda was nominated for a Grammy Award for Best Recording Package during the 57th edition of the event (2015) for FKA Twigs' debut studio album LP1.

== Discography ==
Albums

- Labyrinth (2019)
- Galatea (2022)
- Celest (2023)
- Lili (2024)
- Soem (2026)

EPs

- Heart (2017)
- Luna (2018)
