= Kick I =

2020 studio album by Arca

- Digital and streaming edition cover. Physical CD has the name Arca on the cover.

Studio album by Arca
- Released: 26 June 2020
- Genres: Avant-pop; electronic; IDM; deconstructed club; experimental pop
- Length: 38:07
- Languages: Spanish; English
- Label: XL
- Producer: Arca

Arca chronology
Arca (2017)	Kick I (2020)	Madre (2021)

Singles from Kick I
- 1. "Nonbinary" Released: 30 April 2020; 2. "Time" Released: 20 May 2020; 3. "Mequetrefe" Released: 17 June 2020; 4. "KLK" Released: 22 June 2020

Kick I (stylized as KiCk i; pronounced "kick one") is the fourth studio album by Venezuelan electronic record producer Arca. Recorded between Barcelona and London, the album was released on 26 June 2020 through XL Recordings. Kick I was presented with four singles: "Nonbinary", "Time", "Mequetrefe", and "KLK" featuring Rosalía. It also includes collaborations with Björk, Shygirl, and Sophie. The album was nominated for Best Dance/Electronic Album at the 63rd Annual Grammy Awards, as well as for Best Alternative Music Album at the 22nd Annual Latin Grammy Awards.

Kick I is the first entry of a Kick quintet. The rest of the entries were released in November–December 2021.

== Background ==
Shortly after releasing her 62-minute long mix "@@@@@", on March 8, 2020 Arca revealed to Garage Magazine that she would be releasing her next album in the summer of 2020 and that it would feature Icelandic singer Björk and Spanish new flamenco alternative artist Rosalía. She had already previewed some of the songs in 2019 through live videos on her Instagram profile. Arca explained that "there was a clear intention [on the album] to allow every self to express itself. Not to decide how much air time each self would get, but to allow for modulation between them in a spontaneous way."

On May 20, 2020, Arca announced through social media the release date of the album as well as its tracklist and cover art, which was shot by Catalan artist Carlota Guerrero, Carlos Sáez and herself. The album was made available to preorder since that day on streaming platforms since it will only be released digitally internationally while there will be a CD and LP edition for the United Kingdom on July 17.

== Composition ==
Kick I is an avant-pop, IDM, electronic, deconstructed club, and experimental pop album that takes influence from reggaeton, techno, bubblegum electro, industrial, electropop, trap, R&B, psychedelic music and PC Music. It is a departure from Arca's previous ambient work into more pop melodies, and has been called "an anti-pop pop album". The songs play with pop song structure, being described as "all bridge—stretches of evolution from one idea or mindset to the next." The operatic voice showcased on 2017's Arca can be heard on "No Queda Nada" and "Calor". The majority of the album uses lyrics as "textural elements rather than vehicles for ideas or stories" and features heavy use of rapping. The album touches on lyrical themes of identity, both gender and cultural. Ghersi's coming out as a non-binary trans woman was a big influence on the album, especially the first track and lead single "Nonbinary". Kick I contains mostly Spanish lyrics, connecting with Ghersi's Venezuelan roots, as well as her first lyrics in English. "Time" features "effervescent electropop" that has been compared to the work of Swedish singer Robyn. "Mequetrefe" is a reclamation of a derogatory Spanish term with a "bashed-up skeleton of a reggaetón rhythm".

== Critical reception ==
Professional ratings
Aggregate scores
Source	Rating
AnyDecentMusic?	7.7/10
Metacritic	74/100
Review scores
Source	Rating
AllMusic	4/5 stars
Exclaim!	9/10
The Guardian	3/5 stars
The Line of Best Fit	7.5/10
Loud and Quiet	9/10
NME	4/5 stars
The Observer	4/5 stars
Paste	8.8/10
Pitchfork	7.5/10
Slant Magazine	4/5 stars

Kick I was met with generally positive reviews. At Metacritic, it holds an average score of 74 out of 100, based on 16 professional reviews. Chal Ravens of Pitchfork called Kick I Arca's "most accessible music to date" and praised Arca's increased confidence, but wished the lyrics were structured as more traditional pop songs. Liam Inscoe-Jones from The Line of Best Fit thought the album was enjoyable yet anticlimactic and that its sound were less fresh than it would've been years ago. Kaelen Bell, writing for Exclaim! called the album an "older sister" to Charli XCX's Pop 2 in its merging of pop and experimental music. Tom Hull gave the album a B-plus and found it "arch, arty, arcane", and "pretty unique".

The album was nominated for Best Dance/Electronic Album at the 63rd Annual Grammy Awards losing to Kaytranada’s Bubba, the album was also nominated for Best Alternative Music Award at the 22nd Annual Latin Grammy Awards but lost out to Nathy Peluso’s Calambre.

=== Accolades ===
Accolades for Kick I
Publication	Accolade	Rank	Ref.
Pitchfork	The 50 Best Albums of 2020	40	
Stereogum	Stereogum's 50 Best Albums of 2020 – Mid-Year	21	
Stereogum	The 50 Best Albums of 2020	32	
Bleep	Top 10 Albums of the Year 2020	1	

== Track listing ==
All tracks written and produced by Alejandra Ghersi, unless noted otherwise.

Standard edition
No.	Title	Lyrics	Music	Producer(s)	Length
1.	"Nonbinary"				2:19
2.	"Time"				2:45
3.	"Mequetrefe" (transl. "Whipper-snapper")				2:20
4.	"Riquiquí"				2:39
5.	"Calor" (transl. "Heat")				3:32
6.	"Afterwards" (featuring Björk)	Antonio Machado	Arca; Björk Guðmundsdóttir		4:02
7.	"Watch" (featuring Shygirl)	Shygirl			2:28
8.	"KLK" (featuring Rosalía)	Rosalia Vila Tobella	Arca; Cardopusher	Arca; CardoPusher	3:47
9.	"Rip the Slit"				2:54
10.	"La Chíqui" (transl. "The Girl"; featuring Sophie)	Sophie		Arca; Sophie	2:47
11.	"Machote"				2:57
12.	"No Queda Nada" (transl. "There's Nothing Left")				5:37
Total length:					38:07

Japanese edition (bonus track)
No.	Title	Length
13.	"Mirrors"	7:53
Total length:		46:00

Sample credits

- "Afterwards" contains elements of the poem "Anoche Cuando Dormía" by Antonio Machado
- "Machote" incorporates elements of "Quiero una Chica" by Latin Dreams

== Personnel ==
Credits for Kick I adapted from CD liner notes.

- Arca – composition, production, vocals, mixing, cover image, artwork, design
- Carlos Sáez – additional arrangement (tracks 8, 11), cover image
- Jake Miller – vocal engineer (Björk; track 6)
- Alex Epton – mixing
- Enyang Urbiks – mastering
- Carlotta Guerrero – cover image
- Leo Foo – live photography
- Alex Raduan – black and white photography
- Roberto Rud – artwork photography
- Alfie Allen – design

== Release history ==
Release formats for Kick I
Region	Date	Format	Label	Ref.
Various	26 June 2020	Streaming; Digital download	XL Recordings	
United Kingdom	17 July 2020	CD; LP	XL Recordings	
Japan	31 July 2020	CD	XL Recordings	
