= @@@@@ =

2020 DJ mix by Arca

Single by Arca
- Released: 21 February 2020
- Recorded: 2018–2020
- Genre: Electronic; experimental; noise; glitch
- Length: 62:20
- Label: XL
- Songwriter: Arca
- Producer: Arca

Arca singles chronology
"Saunter" (2017)	"@@@@@" (2020)	"Nonbinary" (2020)

Professional ratings
Review scores
Source	Rating
Pitchfork	8.1/10

"@@@@@" is a mixtape released as a single by Venezuelan record producer Arca. It premiered on NTS Radio on 19 February 2020. It was officially released on 21 February 2020 via XL Recordings.

== Background and release ==
On 18 February 2020, Arca announced she would be premiering new music alongside posting a cryptic video to her social media accounts. The mix premiered at 6pm GMT on NTS Radio. Shortly after, a visual directed by Frederik Heyman accompanying all 62 minutes of the mix was uploaded to Arca's YouTube channel. Tour dates were also announced the same day. "@@@@@" was officially released on 21 February 2020 and a tracklist was also revealed via Arca's social media. In an accompanying statement, Arca said that the track is "a transmission broadcasted into this world from a speculative fictional universe in which the fundamentally analogue format of FM pirate radio remains one of few means to escape authoritarian surveillance powered by a hostage sentience gestated by a post-singularity AI." The single was mastered by Enyang Urbiks in Berlin.

== Track listing ==
All tracks written and produced by Alejandra Ghersi. Tracklist adapted from YouTube.

"@@@@@" track listing
No.	Title	Length
1.	"Diva"	1:01
2.	"Construct"	1:46
3.	"Turner"	3:01
4.	"Devastation"	2:08
5.	"Survivors"	1:19
6.	"Recursion"	2:33
7.	"Monstrua" (transl. "Monster")	1:13
8.	"Bebé" (transl. "Baby")	0:25
9.	"Amputee"	0:09
10.	"Chipilina"	2:49
11.	"In the Face"	0:38
12.	"Predator"	2:42
13.	"Pacifier"	3:00
14.	"Psychosexual"	1:02
15.	"Mujere" (transl. "Women")	2:13
16.	"Cypher"	2:31
17.	"Murciélaga" (transl. "Bat")	4:00
18.	"Phantasy"	1:29
19.	"No Lo Digas" (transl. "Don't Say It")	2:48
20.	"Amantes" (transl. "Lovers")	2:42
21.	"Membrane"	2:45
22.	"Apuro" (transl. "Trouble")	4:09
23.	"Saintly Pride"	3:26
24.	"Avasallada" (transl. "Overwhelmed")	1:41
25.	"Dysphoria"	1:06
26.	"Gaita" (transl. "Bagpipes")	2:09
27.	"Form"	3:42
28.	"Travesti" (transl. "Transvestite")	1:20
29.	"Heaventsent"	2:30
30.	"X"	0:03
Total length:		62:20
