= Vyzee =

Single by Sophie

from the album Product
- A-side: "MSMSMSM"
- Released: 24 November 2015
- Genre: Hyperpop
- Length: 3:23
- Label: Numbers
- Songwriter: Sophie Xeon
- Producer: Sophie Xeon

Sophie singles chronology
"L.O.V.E." (2015)	"Vyzee" (2015)	"9 (After Coachella)" (2017)

"Vyzee" (stylized in all uppercase) is a song recorded by the British music producer Sophie, released on 24 November 2015 through Numbers as the eighth and final single from her compilation album Product (2015).

== Background and release ==
Sophie announced her compilation album Product on 30 September 2015, to contain four previously released tracks—"Bipp", "Elle", "Lemonade", and "Hard"—and four new ones. Following the release of "MSMSMSM", "Just Like We Never Said Goodbye" and "L.O.V.E.", "Vyzee" was the final single to be released off the album on 24 November 2015, three days before its official release. "Vyzee" was first played at Sophie's Boiler Room set in 2014 and had since received a cult following. The song was released on vinyl as the B-side to "MSMSMSM"; Numbers reissued it in 2019.

== Composition and reception ==
Sophie Walker of The Forty-Five defined it as hyperpop. James Keith of Complex called it "maximalist '90s dance-pop". Keith said that the song "hits all the usual Sophie buttons—jaunty melody, tongue-in-cheek vocal sample, hard percussion ... there's also a faint hint of bassline, most noticeably in the helter-skelter melody".

Mr. P of Tiny Mix Tapes called it a "bouncy, effervescent, squishy, bubbly, fizzy, vivacious little banger". Colin Joyce of Spin called it "watery", "elastic" and "plasticine", "fulfilling the melting pop promises" of the three previous Product singles. According to Joyce, "on this one, the glow stick has finally popped — spewing its luminous innards everywhere", and that, like Sophie's song "Bipp", the song "makes its overtures ambivalent". Keith said: "A typically skewed take on pop music, the producer's sonic weirdness doesn't show any signs of getting tired any time soon".

The New York Times ranked it as the 8th best song of the year. Walker named it the fifth best hyperpop song of all time, saying that "Vyzee" "is the exploding plastic inevitable—a cheerleading rally to the hilt, popping frothing like a can of cola shaken to the limit".

== Charts ==
In 2021, the "MSMSMSM / Vyzee" vinyl appeared on the Official Physical Singles Chart and the Official Vinyl Singles Chart.

Chart performance for "MSMSMSM / Vyzee"
Chart (2021)	Peak position
UK Physical Singles (Official Charts)	11
UK Vinyl Singles (Official Charts)	6
