= MSMSMSM =

Single by Sophie

from the album Product
- B-side: "Vyzee"
- Released: 30 September 2015
- Length: 3:35
- Label: Numbers
- Songwriter: Sophie Xeon
- Producer: Sophie Xeon

Sophie singles chronology
"Hard" (2014)	"MSMSMSM" (2015)	"Just Like We Never Said Goodbye" (2015)

"MSMSMSM" is a song recorded by the British music producer Sophie. It was released on 30 September 2015 as a single, later appearing on the artist's compilation album Product (2015). Along with the single's release, a Product clothing line was announced, though it was immediately sold out, leading sources to question if the line was ever on sale. An amorphous ‘silicone product’ was also announced with many music publications noting its similarity to silicone sex toys. "MSMSMSM" was released on vinyl as the A-side to "Vyzee". It was named one of the best songs of the year by Crack and Vice. "MSMSMSM" was subsequently featured in a 2026 McDonald's television advert.

== Charts ==
In 2021, the "MSMSMSM / Vyzee" vinyl appeared at the Official Physical Singles Chart and the Official Vinyl Singles Chart.

Chart performance for "MSMSMSM / Vyzee"
Chart (2021)	Peak position
UK Physical Singles Chart (OCC)	11
UK Vinyl Singles Chart (OCC)	6
