= GFOTY =

British pop singer (born 1990)

- Born: Polly-Louisa Salmon; 19 July 1990 (age 36)
- Origin: London, England, United Kingdom
- Genre: Hyperpop
- Occupation: Singer
- Years active: 2012–present
- Labels: PC Music; Pretty Wavvy; Girlfriend
- Website: gfoty.com

Polly-Louisa Salmon (born 19 July 1990), better known by her stage name GFOTY, (which is an abbreviation of Girlfriend of the Year), is a British pop singer. From 2013 to 2018, she released music through the PC Music label. She now independently releases her music.

== Early life ==
Polly-Louisa Salmon was born and raised in London, England. Her father is art-dealer and business man Jeff Salmon. Her parents got divorced when she was young.

== Career ==
During her early career, she ran a blog and started making music on GarageBand. Her earliest songs include "Take a Picture", which includes rap group Serious Thugs, and "Friday Night", which is a darkly comical take on pop clichés about partying teenagers. A remix of the latter was incorporated into the DJ sets of the producer SOPHIE.

Her debut single, "Bobby", was released in 2013 via the PC Music record label and collective. It describes feelings of futility after a breakup. GFOTY uses a spoken word delivery over a tense, synthesised wall of sound. She released Secret Mix in March 2014. It includes cover versions of songs by Celine Dion, Toni Braxton, and Carly Simon. Tiny Mix Tapes named Secret Mix the third best music release of 2014. She also appeared on PC Music's mix for DIS Magazine's DISown. Focusing on the relationship between art and commerce, her contribution includes conspicuous product placement for Red Bull. One of the songs from her mix became her second single "Don't Wanna / Let's Do It". It creates an uneasy mood by taking two conflicting phrases and frantically sampling them.

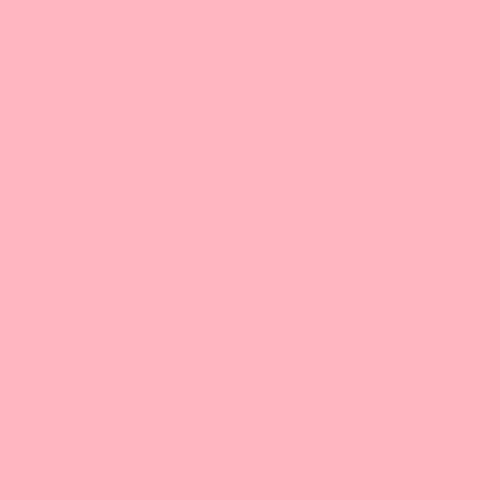
GFOTY's "My Song" was inspired by the hex triplet FFB6C1.

GFOTY contributed vocals to "Hard", the B-side to SOPHIE’s "Lemonade" single. In September 2014, producer Ryan Hemsworth released the compilation EP shh#ffb6c1 on his pseudo-label Secret Songs, which included a GFOTY-featured track named "My Song". Shortly after, she collaborated with PC Music artist Maxo on "Not That Bad".

For Halloween in 2014, GFOTY appeared alongside fellow label artists including A. G. Cook and Danny L Harle for a single, special live Halloween webcast named Dead or Alive. All of the PC Music artists appeared in the webcast, portraying spooky alter egos of themselves. GFOTY's persona was "Ghoulfriend of the Year". The show was broadcast in the UK, USA, Denmark and Japan.

In 2015 GFOTY released a mix titled Cake Mix. It is composed of bright, saccharine songs interspersed with buzzing, glitchy breakdowns. The mix includes an adaptation of Peter Andre's 1996 single "Mysterious Girl" featuring Bubbler Ranx and a cover of Blink-182's 2000 single "All the Small Things". In March 2015, a mix titled Dog Food Mix 1 with PC Music artist Spinee was released, as a reworking of GFOTY's earlier songs. A second mix, Dog Food Mix 2, was released in May 2015.

March 2015 saw GFOTY head to the USA to play the PC Music showcase at the Empire Garage in Austin, Texas as part of SXSW. Her performance was well received, with Exclaim! writing that it was a "fascinating set" and Noisey saying "Here's what I did when I saw GFOTY, which was probably the best thing I've seen all week: I fucking lost my mind. I loved it. I was ecstatic." On 8 May 2015, GFOTY performed as part of a PC Music show at BRIC House in Brooklyn, New York as part of the Red Bull Music Academy Festival. The show was billed as the premiere of Pop Cube, "a multimedia reality network".

On 25 October 2016, GFOTY released a glitch pop-influenced pop rock album titled Call Him A Doctor, which is presumed to be a continuation of her previous EP, VIPOTY.

On 9 November 2017, the single "Tongue" was released with an accompanying joint music video for "Tongue" and the VIPOTY track "Poison". "Tongue" is a single from her "greatest hits" compilation called GFOTYBUCKS - which contains 19 tracks from VIPOTY, Call Him A Doctor, past mixes, and various singles - was released on 17 November 2017. On the same date, a "32 page magazine created by GFOTY with exclusive GFOTYBUCKS recipes, lyrics and artwork by various GFOTY approved artists" is available to buy as a bundle with the GFOTYBUCKS CD.

On 14 December 2018, GFOTY confirmed that she had left the PC Music label to become an indie artist. She released her single "Boy Next Door" under her own label "GIRLFRIEND RECORDS, with production by Count Baldor." Via Twitter, she announced that she will be releasing her new EP If You Think I'm A Bitch You Should Meet GFOTY in March 2019, though the EP was eventually pushed back and was then released on 12 April 2019.

On 6 September 2019, via Twitter, had announced she had wrapped up recording for her debut album, GFOTV. She then released the album on 15 November 2019. The album, inspired by television shows, had a runtime of 11:56, with a vast majority of the songs clocking in at a runtime of a minute or under. HighClouds written that GFOTY's mixing of well known television show and "more ambiguous and generic [...] makes it harder to identify which show she’s talking about, but maybe that’s the point GFOTY is trying to get at." In 2020, shortly after the album was originally released, the album was removed on streaming services for unknown reasons.

== Artistry ==
=== Music ===
Secret Mix (2014)
A cover of "Un-Break My Heart" deteriorates into feedback. It leads into "Kiss", which constructs a frenetic beat from pitch-shifted tongue clicks.

GFOTY's music favours tense, bouncy beats with pounding drums. Her style of sing-speaking gives her a more coarse, human quality compared to the rest of the PC Music roster. Describing her singing as "child like", GFOTY often manipulates her words by twisting an individual syllable. Her spoken word vocals are supported by distorted, high-pitched backing vocals. GFOTY's more sentimental songs are offshoots of bittersweet power ballads by singers like Celine Dion and Toni Braxton. She has cited R. Kelly as an influence, calling him "either the most clever guy in the universe or a complete moron, and I love that I can't figure it out."

=== Public image ===
GFOTY has been characterised as "the most obviously political" act on the PC Music label. Her persona is animated and loudmouthed, as a lampoon of club culture. GFOTY's comments regarding race have been criticised, with Noisey removing some of her remarks from its site. She has likened herself to a female version of The Game: Penetrating the Secret Society of Pickup Artists. GFOTY's lyrics detail nights of drinking and casual sex. Sporting a sweatsuit for her live performances, she describes her fashion as "a pink onesie covered in Swarovski crystals with loads of money coming out the pockets and Ugg boots". GFOTY uses an exaggeratedly feminine style similar to the cute aesthetic of her contemporaries. However, this is often used to conceal a more sinister element, and she has commented that she doesn't "particularly think gfoty [sic] is cute".

With low-quality selfies, photo manipulation, and the use of wigs, GFOTY shrouds her image and identity. Her facetious interviews with press often blur the line between her real life and the GFOTY character. She characterised GFOTY as "a state of mind which can only be achieved by the deepest level of meditation on a beach in Barbados surrounded by cute jetski instructors." GFOTY often discusses having trained as a chef and baking desserts. She maintains an Instagram profile of inspirational quotes.

== Discography ==
=== Studio albums ===
Title	Album details
Call Him a Doctor	Released: 25 October 2016; Label: PC Music; Formats: Digital download
Dog Food (with Spinee)	Released: 24 October 2016; Label: PC Music; Formats: Digital download
FEMMEDORM	Released: 30 July 2021; Label: GIRLFRIEND RECORDS; Formats: LP, digital download
INFLUENZER	Released: 7 March 2025; Label: GIRLFRIEND RECORDS; Formats: LP, digital download

=== Mini-albums ===
Title	Album details
GFOTV	Released: 15 November 2019; Label: GIRLFRIEND RECORDS; Formats: LP, digital download

=== Compilation albums ===
Title	Album details
GFOTYBUCKS	Released: 17 November 2017; Label: PC Music; Formats: CD, digital download, Vinyl

=== Extended plays ===
Title	Album details
VIPOTY	Released: 29 March 2016; Label: PC Music; Formats: Digital download
GFOTYBUCKS : REDCUPS	Released: 6 April 2018; Label: PC Music; Formats: Digital download
If You Think I'm A Bitch, You Should Meet GFOTY	Released: 12 April 2019; Label: GIRLFRIEND RECORDS; Formats: LP, cassette, digital download
Ham Chunks and Wine	Released: 29 May 2020; Label: Pretty Wavvy; Formats: Digital download

=== Mixes ===
Title	Year	Label
'V DAY MIX'	2012	—N/a
'Secret Mix'	2014	PC Music
'PC Music x DISown Radio' (with A. G. Cook, Danny L Harle, Kane West, Lil Data and Nu New Edition)	2014	PC Music
'Dead or Alive' (with A. G. Cook, Danny L Harle, Kane West, Life Sim, Lil Data, Lipgloss Twins, Spinee and Thy Slaughter)	2014	PC Music
'Cake Mix'	2015	PC Music
'Dog Food Mix 1' (with Spinee)	2015	PC Music
'Boiler Room x SXSW DJ Set'	2015	Boiler Room
'Dog Food Mix 2' (with Spinee)	2015	PC Music
'Pop City RBMA Mix' (with A. G. Cook, EASYFUN, felicita, Hannah Diamond, Lil Data and Spinee)	2016	PC Music
'01: Holy Place of Madness Live Mix: dome of doom / begin your journey' (with Spinee as Holy Place of Madness)	2016	—N/a
'02 Holy Place of Madness Halloween Mix: rip the veil and disguise yourself' (with Spinee as Holy Place of Madness)	2016	—N/a
'The Way I Rock'	2017	—N/a
'Club Repz Promo Mix '	2017	—N/a
'COTTON EYED GF-j-O-e-TY'	2017	—N/a
'Down It Fresherz Promo Mix'	2017	—N/a
'HUGE GFOTY'S HUGE MIX'	2017	—N/a
'BANGFACE Takeover'	2019	Rinse FM
'GFOTY Mix 4 Turban | Radiowave'	2019	TURBAN RADIOWAVE
'MINEGALA SET'	2019	—N/a
'SPINEE & GFOTY'S HALLOWEENIE 2019 PARTY MIX - NTS' (with Spinee)	2019	—N/a

=== Singles ===
Title	Year	Label	Album
"Take a Picture" (featuring $eriou$ †hug$)	2012	Gamsonite	Non-album single
"Friday Night"	2012	Gamsonite	GFOTYBUCKS
"First Date With a Demon" (featuring DJ BELLZZ)	2012	Gamsonite	Non-album singles
"Dating Call"	2012	Gamsonite	Non-album singles
"Bobby"	2013	PC Music	Non-album singles
"Don't Wanna / Let's Do It"	2014	PC Music	PC Music, Vol. 1 and GFOTYBUCKS
"My Song"	2014	Secret Songs	shh#ffb6c1 and GFOTYBUCKS
"Christmas Day"	2014	PC Music	GFOTYBUCKS
"USA"	2015	PC Music	PC Music, Vol. 1 and GFOTYBUCKS
"Amazing"	2016	PC Music	VIPOTY
"Month of Mayhem"	2017	PC Music	Month of Mayhem
"Tongue"	2017	PC Music	GFOTYBUCKS
"Boy Next Door"	2018	GIRLFRIEND RECORDS	If You Think I'm A Bitch, You Should Meet GFOTY
"CREEP(UR A)"	2019	—N/a	Non-album singles
"Flippy Wonderland"	2019	GIRLFRIEND RECORDS	Non-album singles
"I AM THE CHAMPION"	2019	—N/a	Non-album singles
"EX-MAS IN THE WOODS"	2019	—N/a	Non-album singles
"Destroy U" (with Shirobon)	2020	Hyperwave Records	Non-album singles
"Here With Me"	2020	Pretty Wavvy	Ham Chunks and Wine
"FISH IN LAKE"	2021	GIRLFRIEND RECORDS	FEMMEDORM
"KOOKS SONG"	2021	GIRLFRIEND RECORDS	FEMMEDORM
"CONGRATS.."	2024	GIRLFRIEND RECORDS	INFLUENZER
"YOU CARE"	2024	GIRLFRIEND RECORDS	INFLUENZER
"GRWM (Eww)"	2025	GIRLFRIEND RECORDS	INFLUENZER

=== Featured singles ===
Title	Year	Label	Album
"Not That Bad" (Maxo featuring GFOTY)	2014	—N/a	Non-album singles
"DogofMoon" (Asian Jewel featuring GFOTY)	2018	—N/a	Non-album singles
"GTFO" (Justin Abisror featuring GFOTY)	2019	—N/a	Swag Money 3
"Mile High" (Rony Rex & Laz Perkins featuring GFOTY)	2020	Youth Control	Non-album single
"Stupid Horse (Remix)" (100 gecs featuring GFOTY and Count Baldor)	2020	Dog Show Records	1000 gecs & The Tree of Clues
"Tamagotchi" (Putochinomaricón featuring GFOTY)	2022	Elefant Records	JÁJÁ ÉQÚÍSDÉ (Distopía Aburrida)
"Mi Casa Es Tu Casa" (Sofía Martín featuring GFOTY, LVL1)	2026	ONErpm	Spain Loves Me

=== Other appearances ===
Title	Year	Label	Album
"I'm Pretty" (Lil Gash featuring GFOTY)	2012	Gamsonite	King of Fiji Vol. 1
"Half Pint" (Powermilk)	2012	Gamsonite	Non-album single
"HARD" (SOPHIE)	2014	Numbers	PRODUCT
"John White Christmas Man"	2016	—N/a	Non-album singles
"GFOTY IS COMING HOME (three lions)"	2018	—N/a	Non-album singles
"feels so good" (recovery girl featuring Space Candy, GFOTY, Lil Mariko & Diana Starshine)	2021	—N/a	recovery girl & friends MIXTAPE

=== Music videos ===
Title	Year
"Bobby"	2013
VIPOTY	2016
"Heaven"	2016
"The Argument"	2017
"Month of Mayhem"	2017
"Poison/Tongue"	2017
"Lemsip"	2017
"USA" (Lyric video)	2017
"Don't Wanna / Let's Do It" (Lyric video)	2017
"Boy Next Door"	2018
GFOTV	2019
"I Am The Champion"	2019
"Here With Me"	2020
"Stupid Horse (Remix)" (100 gecs featuring GFOTY and Count Baldor)	2020
"Rid of All" (featuring Count Baldor)	2020
"FISH IN LAKE"	2021
"KOOKS SONG"	2021
"BRAND NEW BRA"	2021
"Tamagotchi" (PUTOCHINOMARICÓN featuring GFOTY)	2022
"CONGRATS..."	2024
"GRWM (eww)"	2025
