= Incendio (song) =

2021 single by Arca

- Arca in the music video for "Incendio"

Single by Arca

from the album Kick III
- Language: Spanish
- English title: Fire
- Released: 27 September 2021
- Genre: industrial rap; Brazilian funk
- Length: 2:44
- Label: XL
- Songwriters: Arca; Mark Luva
- Producers: Arca; Mark Luva

Music video
- "Incendio" on YouTube

"Incendio" is a song by Venezuelan musician and record producer Arca, released as a single by XL Recordings on 27 September 2021. Arca co-wrote and co-produced the recording with Spanish producer Mark Luva, and it was later included on her sixth studio album, Kick III (2021).

Performed in Spanish, "Incendio" combines rap with distorted electronic percussion, while Arca's voice changes in pitch and delivery as the recording progresses. Its lyrics describe witchcraft and include a reference to spoon bending in the film The Matrix (1999). Stereogum selected the track as one of the five best songs of the week following its release, and The A.V. Club later considered it the strongest track across the five-album Kick series.

A music video directed by Arca was released in October 2023, after premiering during her Mutant;Destrudo performances at the Park Avenue Armory in New York City. The video shows her facial movements being altered by an electrical stimulation device developed by Daito Manabe, which converts the music into signals that stimulate her facial muscles.

== Background and release ==
Arca previewed "Incendio" online for several months before releasing it in September 2021. The single followed Madre, an extended play she had issued in January of that year. Its cover artwork was created by Frederik Heyman, who had previously worked with Arca on the video for "Nonbinary".

The release coincided with the online premiere of a 55-minute Arca concert film directed by Weirdcore. Recorded in Ibiza, the film formed part of the Club to Club festival's C0C project and was streamed through Dice. Tickets were available from €3, with proceeds going to Casa Rifugio Marcella, a temporary shelter for transgender and non-binary people who had experienced violence or discrimination.

On 9 November 2021, Arca confirmed that "Incendio" would appear on Kick III when she announced the album and released "Electra Rex". The album was released on 1 December, with "Incendio" placed as its second track. The song later appeared on Kick, a compilation released on 9 December 2022 whose track listing was selected through fan voting on Discord.

== Composition and lyrics ==
"Incendio" is an industrial rap song whose percussion draws on Brazilian funk. Distorted bass and metallic beats accompany Arca's rapid Spanish delivery, while the rhythm incorporates elements of trap and breakbeat. As the opening verse gives way to a stretched, high-pitched cry, the arrangement becomes increasingly fragmented and the drums begin to break apart. Near the end of the recording, Arca repeats the title through layers of reverberation and electronic noise.

The title is Spanish for "fire", and the lyrics describe acts of witchcraft through images of blood and burning. One line about bending a spoon with the mind alludes to The Matrix, specifically the spoon-bending scene in the Oracle's apartment. Arca connected the scene with the song's treatment of witchcraft and with the idea that thought could alter physical reality. Later in the lyrics, she describes herself as elastic and invokes Catwoman before asking to be called "La Santa María".

Musicologist Marina Hervás Muñoz interpreted "Incendio" as a continuation of "Bruja", the track immediately preceding it on Kick III. She read the imagery of fire and blood as the outcome of the witches' gathering described in the earlier song.

== Critical reception ==
On 1 October 2021, Stereogum placed "Incendio" fourth on its list of the five best songs of the week. The publication described it as a more chaotic development of the rapping Arca had used on "Nonbinary" and drew attention to the changes in her voice and cadence over the course of the track.

Emeka Okonkwo of Resident Advisor praised the song's dance-floor appeal and compared its rhythms and abrasive percussion with Sophie's "Unisil". He also highlighted Arca's rapid Spanish delivery and the way her shouted repetition of the title develops into a siren-like sound.

Reviewing Kick III, Max Freedman of The A.V. Club considered "Incendio" the strongest track across the five Kick albums. He praised the song's sound design, describing passing-vehicle sounds interspersed with percussion, as well as a vocal performance that moves between shouting and childlike laughter. Heather Phares of AllMusic found that the space left in the arrangement gave its rhythm greater impact. Ed Power of Hot Press heard melancholy and introspection in both "Incendio" and "Skullqueen", identifying an emotional quality beneath the force of the album's production.

== Music video ==
The Park Avenue Armory (pictured in 1984), where the video premiered during Mutant;Destrudo

Arca directed the music video for "Incendio", which was released on 25 October 2023 after premiering during Mutant;Destrudo, her four-night performance series commissioned by the Park Avenue Armory. The performances were held at the New York venue from 11 to 15 October.

At the beginning of the video, Arca faces the camera and breathes while wearing a device attached to her head. Once the song begins, flashing lights accompany visible contractions in her face. Manabe's device converts the music into electrical signals that stimulate Arca's facial muscles, and the resulting movements are shown without additional manipulation of the footage. Masaki Teruoka engineered the electrical stimulation device, Shaun MacDonald operated the camera, and Vincent de Belleval designed the lighting.

== Personnel ==
- Arca – vocals, programming, songwriting, production, mixing
- Mark Luva – programming, songwriting, production
- Frederik Heyman – cover artwork
