= Bipp =

Song by Sophie

Single by Sophie

from the album Product
- B-side: "Elle"
- Released: 17 June 2013
- Genre: Dance; bubblegum bass; hyperpop; synthpop
- Length: 3:01 (digital); 3:44 (vinyl)
- Label: Numbers
- Songwriter: Sophie Xeon
- Producer: Sophie

Sophie singles chronology
"Nothing More to Say" (2013)	"Bipp" (2013)	"Elle" (2013)

"Bipp" (stylised in all uppercase) is a song by British record producer Sophie. It was released as a single on 17 June 2013 as Sophie's first release on the label Numbers, backed by the B-side "Elle". Upon release, the song became a critical success, appearing on numerous end-of-year single polls and bringing Sophie early attention.

== Reception ==
"Bipp"
"Bipp" features a pitch-shifted vocal over a minimal rhythm that uses a flanging effect.

"Bipp" received attention from music critics, topping XLR8R's year-end list of tracks and placing 17 on Pitchfork's list. Pitchfork described the track as "rearranging emblazoned beats and rollercoaster dynamics in favor of vigorous sound design and the sticky hooks," and later ranked "Bipp" 56 on its list of the best tracks from 2010 to 2014. Resident Advisor described the track as "wet and slippery", and praised its pitched-up vocal, stating that "'Bipp' takes a tired device and revitalizes it through sheer insistence. B-side "Elle" features more chaotic rhythm and synths, drawing comparisons to TNGHT and Rustie. The Forty-Five's Sophie Walker named it the 24th best hyperpop song of all time.

== Autechre remix ==
"Bipp (Autechre Mx)"

Remix by Autechre
- B-side: "Unisil"
- Released: January 14, 2021
- Genre: downtempo; pop
- Length: 3:33 (digital); 5:39 (vinyl)
- Label: Numbers

After releasing Product, her first album, Sophie claimed that no remixes should be made of her music except for Autechre, a British electronic music duo. After one of the members of Autechre had heard an early promotional copy of "Bipp", Numbers tried to convince Autechre to remix the song.

In 14 January 2021, Autechre released a remix of "Bipp" as a single through Numbers and on streaming. A vinyl version of the single was released on 28 January, with bonus track "Unisil" on the B-side. Andrew Ryce writing for Resident Advisor described the single as "disappointing" and "oddly restrained".

== Track listing ==
12" single
No.	Title	Length
1.	"Bipp"	3:44
2.	"Elle"	3:44
Total length:		7:28

Digital download
No.	Title	Length
1.	"Bipp"	3:01
2.	"Elle"	3:44
Total length:		6:45

== Credits ==
- Sophie – production, composition

== Charts ==
In 2021, the "Bipp / Elle" vinyl appeared on the Official Physical Singles Chart and the Official Vinyl Singles Chart.

Chart performance for "Bipp / Elle"
Chart (2021)	Peak position
UK Physical Singles Chart (OCC)	12
UK Vinyl Singles Chart (OCC)	7
