= Hard (Sophie song) =

Single by Sophie

from the album Product
- A-side: "Lemonade"
- Released: 4 August 2014
- Length: 2:54
- Label: Numbers
- Songwriter: Sophie Xeon
- Producer: Sophie Xeon

Sophie singles chronology
"Lemonade" (2014)	"Hard" (2014)	"MSMSMSM" (2015)

"Hard" is a song recorded by the British music producer Sophie with vocal contributions by the British singer GFOTY. It was released on 4 August 2014 as a single, later appearing on the artist's compilation album Product (2015). It was also released on vinyl as the B-side to "Lemonade". When creating the song, Sophie thought about "physics and materials"; the musician said the song "is made from metal and latex". Pitchfork named it the "Best New Track". It was named one of the best songs of the year by Pitchfork (alongside "Lemonade"), Spin, Tiny Mix Tapes, Dazed, the annual Pazz & Jop critics poll, and DMY at number one. In 2017, Vice ranked it the 98th best EDM song of all time. The New York Times named "Hard" one of Sophie's most essential songs.

== Charts ==
In 2021, the "Lemonade / Hard" vinyl appeared at the Official Physical Singles Chart and the Official Vinyl Singles Chart.

Chart performance for "Lemonade / Hard"
Chart (2021)	Peak position
UK Physical Singles Chart (OCC)	5
UK Vinyl Singles Chart (OCC)	3

== Credits ==
- Sophie – production, composition
- GFOTY – vocals
