= Dedbeat Weekender =

UK music event

Dedbeat Weekender was a UK music event first held on the weekend of 23 February 2001. There were 4 sell out events until its ending in 2004. The musical direction for the weekender was a mix of Hip-Hop and Electronica. Dedbeat was held inside a self-contained holiday park.

== History ==
Previous line ups included acts such as Aphex Twin, Big Daddy Kane, Andrew Weatherall, Madlib, Blackalicious, DJ Stingray, Peanut Butter Wolf, Keith Tenniswood, Jamie Liddel, Quantic, Ugly Duckling, Mr. Scruff, Edan, Venetian Snares, DJ Craze, Luke Vibert, Plaid, Roots Manuva, The Pharcyde, Jeru the Damaja, DMX Krew, Brand Nubian and others.

In 2013 Dedbeat collaborated with the record label Numbers to put on a weekender festival called 'Pleasure Principle' in Cornwall, UK.
