= Unisil =

2021 single by Sophie

Single by Sophie

from the album Product (reissue)
- A-side: "Bipp" (Autechre Mx)
- Released: January 28, 2021
- Recorded: 2015
- Genre: Glitch; industrial
- Length: 2:06
- Label: Numbers
- Songwriter(s): Sophie Xeon
- Producer(s): Sophie

Sophie singles chronology
"Bipp" (Autechre Mx) (2021)	"Unisil" (2021)	"Reason Why" (2024)

"Unisil" is a song by British record producer Sophie. It was released as single to streaming platforms on January 28, 2021, having been previously available as the B-side to the Autechre remix of "Bipp". First created during sessions for her debut compilation album Product (2015), it was first officially released as a digital download bonus to the "silicon product" edition of the album.

== Background and release ==
"Unisil" was created during the recording of Sophie's debut compilation album, Product (2015). Before its official release, she had played the song at numerous live events. According to a press release, its name is "a reference to the silicone production and curing process, and the hard, fast, and synthetic sound" of the song.

"Unisil" was first released as a bonus track on the "silicon product" version of the album, which many publications noted was shaped like a sex toy. It was made available on January 14, 2021, as the B-side of the Autechre remix of "Bipp". On January 28, the song was released as a standalone single to digital streaming services, with a 12" vinyl containing it and the "Bipp" remix being shipped in April of that year.

== Composition ==
The rhythm of "Unisil" has been described as "galloping" and "glitchy", a style commonly associated with Sophie's work. DMY noted influences from hip-hop and industrial music in the song's sound, calling it "pure industrial mayhem."

== Critical reception ==
"Unisil" received positive reception from music critics. Tom Breihan of Stereogum felt that although the song was created in 2015, "it feels [more] like a message from a more-advanced alien civilization." The Fader's Jordan Darville described it as "a very intense, rollicking track somewhere between an alien spaceship's dancefloor and its self-destruct sequence annoucnement [sic]." Considering it significantly better than its accompanying "Bipp" remix, Giovanni De Scisciolo of Soul Feeder called it "an absolute banger, the last example of the technical abilities of SOPHIE to guess and master the potential of electronic music".

== Track listing ==
Digital download / 12" vinyl EP

1. "Bipp" (Autechre Mx) – 3:33
2. "Unisil" – 2:06
