= Chemistry Lock =

Studio album by Kevin Gorman
- Released: 12 December 2007
- Genre: Techno, Minimal
- Label: International DJ Gigolo

Professional ratings
Review scores
Source	Rating
Allmusic	(?)

Chemistry Lock is the debut album by English electronic musician Kevin Gorman. The music combines elements of techno and house and, as Gorman describes it, he takes most inspiration from the raw, groove led music of Chicago, New York and Detroit. The album was released in December 2007 on International DJ Gigolo.

The album's first single, "DMX", was released in late 2006.

== Track listing ==
1. "DMX"
2. "Build on Sam"
3. "Chemistry Lock"
4. "Voxbox"
5. "Brother"
6. "Lazer"
7. "Slang"
8. "Orange"
9. "Disekt"
10. "Program City"
11. "DMX Remake"
12. "Guardian"
13. "Repeat Rock"
