= Nabihah Iqbal =

English musician, writer, and broadcaster

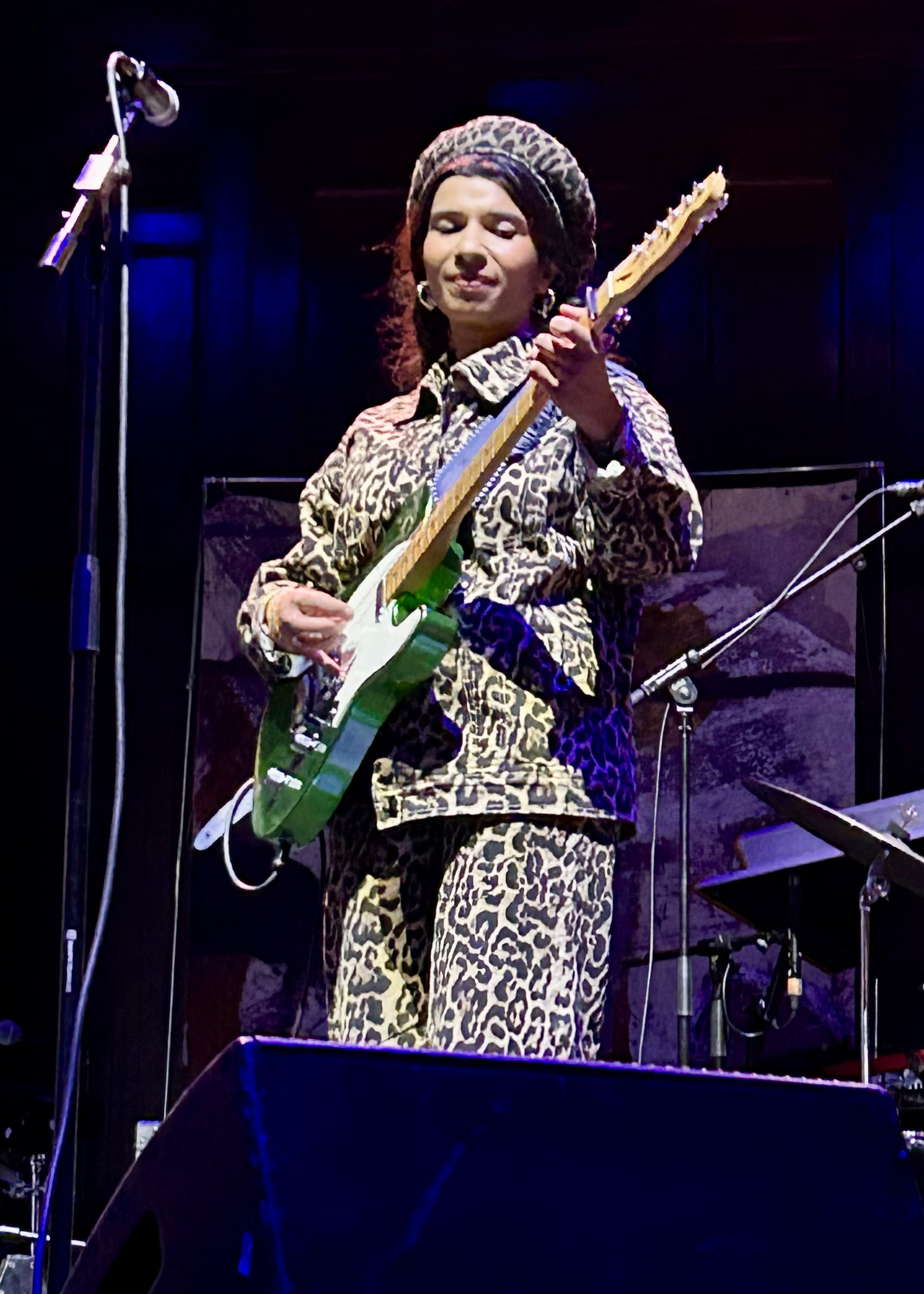
- Iqbal performing at the Albert Hall in Manchester, 2025

Background information
- Also known as: Throwing Shade
- Born: 22 April 1988 (age 38); London, England
- Genres: Indie; alternative rock; cold wave; electronic; experimental
- Occupations: Songwriter; producer
- Labels: Ninja Tune; Ominira; No Pain in Pop; Happy Skull; Beating Heart
- Spouse: Nicholas Daley (m. 2022)

Nabihah Iqbal (born 22 April 1988) is a British musician, writer and broadcaster from London, England. A former legal professional, she has studied at both SOAS and the University of Cambridge. She first released music under the alias Throwing Shade in 2013 whilst contributing vocals to Sophie's early releases such as "Lemonade". She switched to her birth name for her debut album Weighing of the Heart.

== Early life ==
Nabihah Iqbal was born on 22 April 1988 to British Pakistani parents in London near Regent's Park as the eldest daughter of six siblings. Her older brother Haseeb is a poet and her younger brother Shahir is a photographer.

== Career ==
She began developing musical projects while working as a human rights lawyer. Early releases under Throwing Shade landed her a show with NTS Radio which she continues to this day where she grew her following with shows exploring music from across the globe. Her early style explored a mixture of experimental and more dancefloor oriented electronic styles including spoken word. Around the same time she began to contribute vocals to Sophie (a close friend of hers) which after heavy manipulation, would go on to play a key role in early Hyperpop.

In 2017 she switched to releasing under her birth name, so too her style switched towards guitar oriented vocal music. Her debut album 'Weighing of the Heart' was released by Ninja Tune to generally favourable reviews, drawing inspiration from William Blake and Matthew Arnold. One particular review in XLR8R was removed for racism for questioning why she didn't include more of her own heritage in her music, a question Nabihah noted would not have been asked to a white musician. More recently she has undertaken a residency at The BBC Asian Network.

During the COVID-19 pandemic, she was forced to lockdown in Pakistan whilst visiting her grandparents after her album was stolen by thieves. Whilst there she started a webseries documenting local plants.

== Personal life ==
After 10 years together, Iqbal married British menswear designer Nicholas Daley on 20 August 2022.

== Discography ==
=== Studio albums ===
- Weighing of the Heart (2017)
- Dreamer (2023)

=== EPs ===
- 19 Jewels (2014)
- Fate Xclusive (2015)
- House of Silk (2016)

=== Singles ===
- "Mystic Places / Lights" (2013)
- "Chancer" (2014)
- "Something More" (2017)
- "Eternal Passion / Zone 1 to 6000" (2017)
- "Is This Where It Ends" (2020)
- "Elvis" (2021)
- "This World Couldn't See Us" (2023)
