= Product (Sophie album) =

Compilation album by Sophie
- Released: 27 November 2015
- Recorded: 2011–2015
- Genres: Electronic; avant-pop; hyperpop; bubblegum pop; dance-pop
- Length: 25:26
- Label: Numbers
- Producer: Sophie

Sophie chronology
Product (2015)	Oil of Every Pearl's Un-Insides (2018)

Singles from Product
- 1. "Bipp" Released: 17 June 2013; 2. "Elle" Released: 17 June 2013; 3. "Lemonade" Released: 28 July 2014; 4. "Hard" Released: 4 August 2014; 5. "MSMSMSM" Released: 1 October 2015; 6. "Just Like We Never Said Goodbye" Released: 16 October 2015; 7. "L.O.V.E." Released: 6 November 2015; 8. "Vyzee" Released: 24 November 2015

Product (stylised in all caps) is the debut compilation by British electronic music producer Sophie. It was released by Numbers on 27 November 2015. The eight tracks on Product appeared as singles released from 2013 to 2015. The album was made available in "silicon bubble cases", and its release coincided with the launch of a line of apparel (Note: There is no evidence of the apparel line ever being available for purchase. Both the platform boots and sunglasses are part of visual effects artist, collaborator, and fellow PC Music contributor Hannah Diamond's portfolio, labeled as 'SOPHIE - Virtual Merchandise'.) and a "silicon product" resembling a sex toy.

Upon its release, the compilation was met with mostly positive reviews from critics. In 2019, Numbers announced a re-release in limited quantities in its original format of four vinyl singles, each in a PVC case.

For the album's tenth anniversary, Product was released on streaming platforms on 18 June 2025. This release included previously unreleased song "Ooh", as well as the original release's Japanese exclusive track "Get Higher" and "Unisil", previously digitally released and originally a bonus track of the "silicon product".

== Background ==
Sophie debuted as a solo artist with the February 2013 single "Nothing More to Say", released via the London-based Glaswegian label Huntleys + Palmers. Its follow-up, "Bipp"/"Elle", had been teased on SoundCloud in the previous year and was eventually released on Glaswegian label Numbers later in 2013. The next single, "Lemonade"/"Hard", was released in August 2014.

Product was made available for preorder in September 2015. That month saw the release of "MSMSMSM", and "Just Like We Never Said Goodbye" followed on 15 October. The singles "Vyzee" and "L.O.V.E." were released in November 2015 alongside the full compilation.

== Reissue ==
On 17 June 2025, Numbers announced that Product would be receiving a reissue for its tenth anniversary. The reissue includes the previously released single "Unisil", which was created during sessions for the album, as well as the song "Get Higher", which was originally exclusive to the Japanese CD release of the album. "Ooh", originally known as "Make Respect" was first played live in 2011 and later completed in 2019. The reissue was made available the following day. It will receive a physical release on 11 July on vinyl and CD formats. "Get Higher" and "Ooh" were released as singles along with the reissue itself.

== Critical reception ==
Professional ratings
Aggregate scores
Source	Rating
AnyDecentMusic?	7.3/10
Metacritic	74/100
Review scores
Source	Rating
AllMusic	4/5 stars
Exclaim!	8/10
The Guardian	2/5 stars
The Irish Times	4/5 stars
The Observer	4/5 stars
Pitchfork	6.6/10
Q	3/5 stars
Resident Advisor	4.6/5
Spin	9/10
Vice	A−

The review aggregator website Metacritic gave the album an average score of 74 out of 100, which indicates "generally favourable reviews". Exclaim! senior editor Stephen Carlick called the record "a snapshot of an exciting artist whose tightrope walk between sweet and scary, pop and avant-garde, has yielded some of the best singles of the past few years." The Observer described the album as "disruptive, a sound pushing the limits of what constitutes pop and what is just an annoying noise you are inexplicably paying money for." AllMusic's Heather Phares praised the album as "instantly addictive," noting similarities between the album's "uncanny valley version of pop music" and the output of the PC Music label, but describing Sophie's tracks as "even wilder, with sound design and effects that fall somewhere between Spike Jones and Aphex Twin." Sasha Geffen of Consequence of Sound called it "one of the more mischievous music objects under the current atmosphere," adding that "Product blurs the traditional subject/object power relationship of pop music, bending desire as easily as it bends waveforms".

In a mixed review for The Guardian, Alexis Petridis praised "Bipp" and "Just Like We Never Said Goodbye" as "genuinely brilliant pop songs" but accused the rest of the album of "knackered posturing, tee-hee-it’s-meant-to-be-annoying irony, trite stuff about pop’s relationship to consumerism"; he concluded that Sophie was "sneering at" pop music rather than celebrating it. Mark Richardson of Pitchfork lauded the "enduring brilliance" of the album's first two singles, but was less positive about the more recent material and suggested that the album format did the tracks a disservice: "music this compressed and this syrupy is best heard in small doses, before your ear gets tired listening to it."Allan Raible of ABC News similarly remarked on the "stripped down, sugary pop" of Product as "forward thinking, but profoundly difficult."

=== Accolades ===
MP3 blog Gorilla vs. Bear listed the album as the 12th best of 2015.

In 2020, Spin ranked Product the 25th best album of the decade.

== Track listing ==
All song titles are stylised in all-caps.

Product track listing
No.	Title	Length
1.	"Bipp"	3:00
2.	"Elle"	3:44
3.	"Lemonade"	1:58
4.	"Hard"	2:54
5.	"MSMSMSM"	3:35
6.	"Vyzee"	3:22
7.	"L.O.V.E."	3:38
8.	"Just Like We Never Said Goodbye"	3:08
Total length:		25:26

Silicon product
No.	Title	Length
9.	"Unisil"	2:06
Total length:		27:32

Japanese bonus download
No.	Title	Length
9.	"Get Higher"	3:00
Total length:		28:26

10th anniversary reissue
No.	Title	Length
8.	"Unisil"	2:06
9.	"Get Higher"	3:00
10.	"Ooh"	2:31
11.	"Just Like We Never Said Goodbye"	3:08
Total length:		33:05

== Charts ==
2015 chart performance for Product
Chart (2015)	Peak position
US Top Dance Albums (Billboard)	23

2025 chart performance for Product
Chart (2025)	Peak position
Scottish Albums (Official Charts)	48
UK Albums Sales (OCC)	65
UK Independent Albums (Official Charts)	25
