= Putochinomaricón =

Spanish-Taiwanese musician

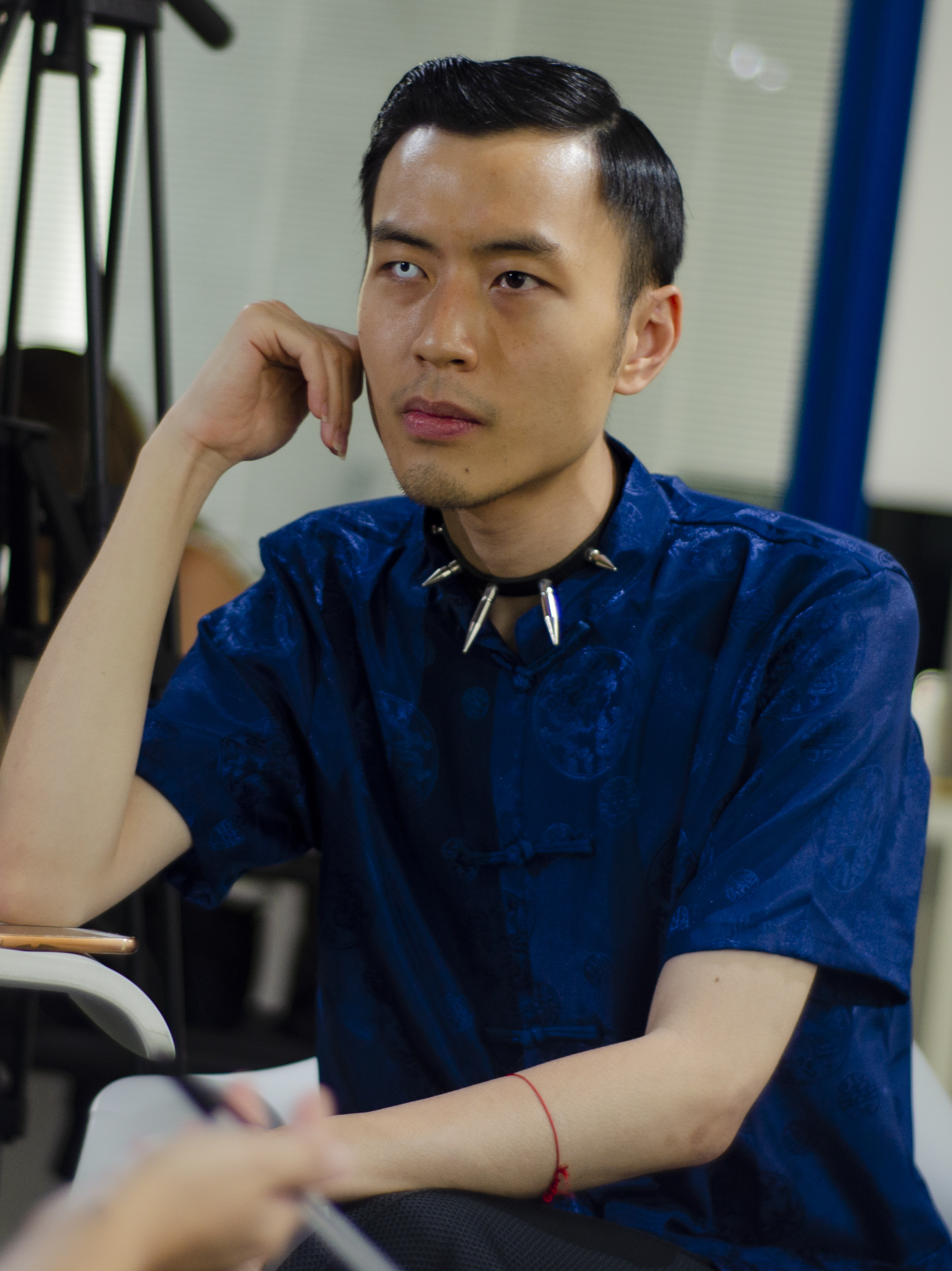
- Putochinomaricón photographed during an interview for eldiario.es in 2019
- Born: Chenta Tsai Tseng; Taipei, Taiwan

Chenta Tsai Tseng (Chinese: 蔡承達), better known as Putochinomaricón (stylized as PUTOCHINOMARICÓN), is a Taiwanese-born Spanish musician and architect. They began in the Spanish alternative music scene in 2018. Their name was created from the insults they would be referred to on the streets. They released their debut album Corazón de cerdo con ginseng al vapor in 2018, followed by Jájá Éqúísdé in 2022, the latter being described as an album of "relief after only knowing resistance".

== Themes ==
Their early singles "Gente de Mierda" and "El Test de la Bravo y la Superpop" associated them with the hyperpop genre. Their music has also been associated with the related glitchcore genre. They cited A-Mei as an influence for them as an East Asian and Taiwanese pop artist and GFOTY as someone they have looked up to as an experimental artist.

Their music has influenced discussions on decolonized dance music, being referred to by The Line of Best Fit as using pop for "fictional speculation and political resistance". On the subject of decolonization in their music, Tseng states "That was a game changer for me. I suddenly realised I am talking about the colonisation of our bodies and identities, but it was hypocritical of me to go back to my living room and use Ableton, where you open it and it has a tuning system that is Western, it marks a four-by-four rhythm. I wanted to use this DAW in the most incorrect way possible."

== Discography ==
Mini albums

- Corazón de Cerdo Con Ginseng al Vapor (2018)
- Miseria Humana (2019)

Albums

Title	Details	Peaks
Title	Details	SPA
Corazón de cerdo con ginseng al vapor	Released: 12 April 2018; Label: Elefant Records; Format: digital download, streaming, limited vinyl	
Jájá Éqúísdé (Distopía Aburrida)	Released: 22 April 2022; Label: Elefant Records; Format: digital download, streaming	26
