= Just Like We Never Said Goodbye =

Single by Sophie

from the album Product
- A-side: "L.O.V.E."
- Released: 15 October 2015
- Genre: Bubblegum pop
- Length: 3:08
- Label: Numbers
- Songwriter: Sophie Xeon
- Producer: Sophie Xeon

Sophie singles chronology
"MSMSMSM" (2015)	"Just Like We Never Said Goodbye" (2015)	"L.O.V.E." (2015)

"Just Like We Never Said Goodbye" is a song recorded by the British music producer Sophie. It was released on 15 October 2015 as a single, later appearing on the artist's compilation album Product (2015). It was also released on vinyl as the B-side to "L.O.V.E."

== Accolades ==
It was named one of the best songs of the year by Fact and Spin. "Just Like We Never Said Goodbye" was featured as one of the artist's best or most essential songs in the lists published by Billboard, The Fader, Junkee, and The New York Times. Billboard named it one of "the 100 greatest song bridges of the 21st century" in 2021. In 2025, Resident Advisor named it the 11th best electronic track between 2000 and 2025.
