= Lemonade (Sophie song) =

Single by Sophie

from the album Product
- B-side: "Hard"
- Released: 28 July 2014
- Genre: Hyperpop
- Length: 1:59
- Label: Numbers
- Songwriter: Sophie Xeon
- Producer: Sophie Xeon

Sophie singles chronology
"Elle" (2013)	"Lemonade" (2014)	"Hard" (2014)

"Lemonade" is a song by the British producer Sophie, released as a single on 28 July 2014 by the label Numbers and on vinyl with "Hard" as the B-side. It features vocal contributions from British musician Nabihah Iqbal. The song appeared on various best-of year-end single polls. "Lemonade" was subsequently featured in a 2015 McDonald's television advert.

== Reception ==
In a positive review, Resident Advisor stated that "this twisted little banger is bound to turn many listeners off—among its parts are high-pitched vocals barking out phrases like 'ca-ca-candy boys' and synths that fizz like pop rocks." AllMusic noted that "both songs schizophrenically flitted between bubblegum pop hooks and more aggressive elements, and both became huge critical successes." Complex described "Lemonade" as "unashamedly silly and hyperactive."

"Lemonade" placed 68th on the 2014 Pazz & Jop critics poll. "Lemonade" was included in the top ten of year-end singles lists by The Washington Post, Resident Advisor, and Complex; Pitchfork ranked "Lemonade"/"Hard" at 21 on its list of the best songs of 2014.

"Lemonade" appeared in a 2015 commercial for McDonald's to promote the brand's lemonade.

Following Sophie's death in 2021, the "Lemonade / Hard" vinyl posthumously entered the UK Physical Singles Chart at number 44, and the UK Vinyl Singles Chart at number 37.

== Track listing ==
12": NMBRS34
No.	Title	Length
1.	"Lemonade"	1:59
2.	"Hard"	2:54
Total length:		4:53

== Credits and personnel ==
- Sophie – production, composition
- Nabihah Iqbal – vocals

== Charts ==
Chart performance for "Lemonade / Hard"
Chart (2021)	Peak position
UK Physical Singles Chart (OCC)	5
UK Vinyl Singles Chart (OCC)	3
