= Kevin Gorman =

British DJ and remixer

- Also known as: Adesse Versions
- Born: Chester, Cheshire, England
- Occupations: DJ; remixer
- Years active: 2000s–present
- Labels: Ostgut Ton; Numbers; Ninja Tune; Cocoon; Ed Banger; Mikrowave

Kevin Gorman, known professionally as Adesse Versions, is a British DJ and remixer.

== Biography ==
Gorman's music has appeared on the labels Ostgut Ton, Numbers, Ninja Tune, Cocoon, Ed Banger, and others. His remix credits include the 1991 R&S release "Vamp" by Outlander, Leftfield for their album Leftism, Blossoms, and Dita Von Teese. From 2015 to 2016, Gorman ran an Adesse Versions show monthly on London's Rinse FM.

Originally from Chester, England, Gorman first came to prominence with a 2006 demo for DJ Hell, featuring the track "DMX", which featured heavy usage of the Beat Repeat feature of Ableton Live. This signing led DJ Hell to request a full album from Gorman for International DeeJay Gigolo Records.

In March 2009, he launched his project Elements, a series of singles featuring the unique aspect of releasing all the component samples of the music alongside the original tracks, as well as a large collection of DJ tools, loops and alternate mixes. The project was released on Mikrowave, Gorman's own imprint. Also on Mikrowave, Gorman released the single "Seven Eight Nine", featuring a live version from the Berlin club the Berghain.

In 2010, Gorman provided music for the soundtrack to the film Shiver, a documentary concerning the controversial practice of shark finning. These Steve Reich–inspired pieces became Frequency Phase Parts 1–3, released in 2012 on the Stroboscopic Artefacts label.

== Selected discography ==
- Domenico Torti featuring Afrika Bambaataa, "Radar" (Adesse Versions remix), 2019
- Kerri Chandler, "The Boom Can" (Adesse Versions edit), 2018
- Dita Von Teese, "La Vie Est Un Jeu" (Adesse Versions remix), 2018
- Maribou State, "Kingdom" (Adesse Versions remix), 2018
- Leftfield, "Original" (Adesse Versions remix), 2017
- Blossoms, "Getaway" (Adesse Versions remix), 2016
- Frequency Phase Parts 1–3 (Stroboscopic Artefacts, 2012)
- "Cast" (Curle, 2011)
- "7am Stepper" (Ostgut Ton, 2010)
- Traversable Wormhole, "Relativistic Time Dilation" (Kevin Gorman Remix) (CLR, 2010)
- Phil Kieran, "Playing with Shadows" (Kevin Gorman Remix) (Cocoon, 2010)
- Elements Parts 1–3 (Mikrowave, 2009)
- "SevenEightNine" 12-inch LP (Mikrowave, 2008) – live at Berghain
- Chemistry Lock LP (International DeeJay Gigolo, 2007)
- Outlander, "Vamp" (Kevin Gorman Remix) (International DeeJay Gigolo, 2007)
- Alloy Mental, "God is Green" (Kevin Gorman Remix) (Skint, 2007)
- "DMX" (International Deeay Gigolo, 2006)
