= Gfotybucks =

2017 GFOTY compilation album

GFOTYBUCKS
- Standard cover (Note: On streaming services, the cover has been altered to censor the GFOTYBUCKS logo on the cup.)

Compilation album by GFOTY
- Released: November 17, 2017
- Studio: PC Music HQ
- Genres: Trance; pop
- Length: 37:41
- Label: PC Music
- Producer: A. G. Cook

GFOTY chronology
Call Him A Doctor (2016)	''GFOTYBUCKS'' (2017)	Gfotybucks: Red Cups (2018)

GFOTYBUCKS (stylised in all caps) is the debut compilation album by British singer GFOTY. It was released 17 November 2017 by music collective and label PC Music. Most of the album's nineteen tracks had appeared on two previous EPs GFOTY had released, VIPOTY and Call Him a Doctor, or were previously released as singles. Additionally, some of the tracks on the album are covers. Consequently, the album was framed as a greatest hits collection. Gfotybucks would also mark GFOTY's only album release under PC Music.

== Background and release ==
In addition to songs from her two previous EPs, some tracks released as singles over the years. Two of which, "My Song", and "Don't Wanna / Let's Do It", received attention from critics.

The physical edition of Gfotybucks was released alongside a thirty-two page magazine, designed by GFOTY, that included lyrics, recipes, and artwork. The album was promoted by "opening a branch" of Gfotybucks, alluding to coffee chain Starbucks, for one night at the Five Miles Club in London.

The album's cover art was photographed by PC Music labelmate Hannah Diamond.

== Critical reception ==
Professional ratings
Review scores
Source	Rating
Clash	6/10

Clash offered a mixed review of the album, saying that Gfotybucks offered both "button-pushing pranksterism" and "nuanced pop cultural critique". The magazine criticised the relatively short length of each track, as well as the experimental nature of the album, citing the lack of hooks in many of the tracks. However, the review highlighted the album's production, in addition to praising the individual tracks "Friday Night" and "Huge".

Anthony Fantano of The Needle Drop's review was also mixed, with Fantano praising Gfotybucks' concept, but describing it sonically as a "Frankenstein monster of pop music". Fantano also labelled the album as gimmicky, and criticised its listenability.

== Track listing ==
Gfotybucks track listing
No.	Title	Length
1.	"My Song"	1:08
2.	"Believe"	2:58
3.	"Don't Wanna / Let's Do It (Bucks Mix)"	2:06
4.	"Tongue"	2:42
5.	"Unbreak My Heart"	0:45
6.	"Red Silver Blue"	1:06
7.	"Poison"	2:47
8.	"Huge"	3:01
9.	"Mysterious GFOTY"	1:23
10.	"Christmas Day"	2:59
11.	"Lemsip (Bucks Mix)"	1:30
12.	"All The Small Things"	1:26
13.	"Lover"	1:42
14.	"Drown Her"	2:22
15.	"It's All Coming Back to Me Now"	1:26
16.	"USA"	2:24
17.	"Kiss"	2:29
18.	"Nobody Does It Better"	0:35
19.	"Friday Night"	3:25
Total length:		37:41
