= Nonbinary (song) =

2020 single by Arca

Single by Arca

from the album Kick I
- Released: 30 April 2020
- Genre: electronic music
- Length: 2:19
- Label: XL
- Songwriter: Alejandra Ghersi
- Producer: Arca

Arca singles chronology
"@@@@@" (2020)	"Nonbinary" (2020)	"Time" (2020)

Music video
- "Nonbinary" on YouTube

"Nonbinary" is a song by Venezuelan musician and record producer Arca. XL Recordings released it on 30 April 2020 as the lead single from her fourth studio album, Kick I. Arca wrote and produced the track, which Alex Epton mixed and Enyang Urbiks mastered. The 2-minute-and-19-second song opens Kick I with an electronic arrangement that places spoken and rapped vocals over sparse metallic percussion and bass, with effects resembling gunfire.

Arca based the lyrics on her concept of "self-states", the moods and personas that she considers parts of a unified self. She explained that the recurring request to "speak for your self-states" asks listeners to recognise those aspects within a single person. Stereogum and Pitchfork described the direct, confrontational delivery as more pop-oriented than much of her earlier solo work. A computer-generated music video directed by Frederik Heyman shows Arca in a sequence of transformed bodies and includes a mechanical restaging of Sandro Botticelli's The Birth of Venus. Pitchfork ranked the video first in its April 2020 selection and later included it among the publication's 20 best music videos of the year.

== Background and release ==
Arca's self-titled third studio album, Arca, was released in 2017. She wanted a period of silence before its successor so that the personal changes following her transition could settle and she could communicate with greater precision. Her next solo release arrived in February 2020 as "@@@@@", a 62-minute composition divided into 30 sections that she called "quantums". Arca described the piece as a prelude to the era that would begin with Kick I. When Arca announced the album in March, she listed "Nonbinary" as its opening track and named Björk, Rosalía, Shygirl and Sophie as collaborators.

Arca had come out as non-binary in 2018 and later identified as a trans woman whose gender identity remained non-binary. During the preparation of Kick I, she described the album as a place for several self-states, each expressing a different mood or persona within one person. She subsequently identified Xen and Electra Rex as examples of these states and said that "self-states" was the term she used in "Nonbinary".

XL issued "Nonbinary" for digital download and streaming on 30 April 2020 as the first single from Kick I. The digital release, accompanied by artwork from HART + LËSHKINA, followed "@@@@@", which Arca had presented as the album's prelude. On 20 May, Arca followed it with "Time", the album's second single. Kick I was released on 26 June and opens with "Nonbinary".

== Composition and lyrics ==
Introduction to "Nonbinary"
The instrumental opening features sparse metallic sounds and isolated percussive impacts before the vocals enter.

"Nonbinary" begins with a measured spoken delivery over a hollow metallic pulse, as stuttering drums and percussive synthesisers establish a sparse rhythmic frame. After the opening monologue, the bass grows more prominent as Arca shifts into deadpan rap, with whispered passages connecting the two modes. Bursts resembling gunfire or explosions interrupt the beat throughout the 2:19 arrangement.

The lyrics move from self-assertion to the repeated instruction to "speak for your self-states". Arca explained that the phrase recognises multiple aspects of a person as parts of a single self. She associated these states with changes in mood and persona, describing each as a way for one selfhood to speak. In the final verse, Arca changes her manner and mood again before identifying herself as non-binary. Arca also used non-binary thinking to describe an openness to change across gender identity and musical expression, saying that this allowed pop and experimental modes to coexist on Kick I. In discussing this combination, she said she had set aside her previous shyness about expressing these ideas directly on the album.

== Music video ==
Arca changes her pose as robotic arms move around a mechanised oyster-shell tableau, reworking Botticelli's The Birth of Venus.	Botticelli's The Birth of Venus, dated c. 1485.

The music video was released with the single on 30 April 2020. Frederik Heyman directed the 3D production, which he developed with Arca from eight months of visual material. After the COVID-19 pandemic altered the album campaign, they assembled the existing images into a single speculative setting. Its mechanical prostheses continue a visual motif that Arca had used in the 2017 "Reverie" video and during her 2019 Mutant;Faith residency at The Shed.

The video follows Arca through a series of bodily transformations and ends with two versions of her in confrontation. The surgical scenes place her pregnant body on an operating table as robotic attendants work around it and depict a pair of giant shears pinning her to a rocky plinth. Its mythological sequence shows her in a shell above a flooded graveyard, surrounded by roses and fitted with mechanical limbs in a reworking of The Birth of Venus. The closing scene places the two Arcas face to face amid flames, where they mime an argument as the song ends.

Rachel Hahn of Vogue linked the final pair of Arcas to the different states expressed in the song, and Verónica Bayetti Flores of Frieze read the shell scene as a bionic, non-binary version of Botticelli's Venus within a video about self-creation. Andrea Barcaro placed the video within Arca's reworking of Greek mythology and argued that its cyborg imagery challenges fixed ideas about sex and gender. Pitchfork placed the video first in its ranking for April 2020, then selected it for an alphabetically ordered list of the year's 20 best music videos.

== Critical reception ==
James Rettig of Stereogum found a playful quality within the song's intimidating sound and regarded its direct confrontation as more immediately accessible than most of Arca's work from the preceding decade. In Pitchfork, Philip Sherburne characterised it as Arca's most confrontational and pop-oriented release to that point. Chal Ravens's later review of Kick I located that directness in the writing, singling out "Nonbinary" as one of the album's few tracks in which the words convey a clear idea or story.

Kitty Empire of The Observer called it a stark opening statement made on behalf of the song's self-states, and Charles Lyons-Burt of Slant Magazine heard a confident assertion of identity in Arca's delivery. John Twells of The Guardian compared the vocal wordplay to Juliana Huxtable's writing, observing that the words merge as Arca repeats the song's central instruction. AllMusic's Heather Phares heard pride in the way the song resists easy classification.

Alex Szeptycki of The Arts Fuse wrote that the bare instrumentation and stuttering percussion concentrated Arca's established sound into a controlled, focused arrangement. Kyle Kohner of Beats Per Minute focused on the bouncing bass and rap performance, which he felt stated the album's purpose from its opening moments. Kaelen Bell of Exclaim! treated the opening beat as the starting point for the album's rapid changes in form.

== Credits and personnel ==
Credits are adapted from Shazam and Pitchfork.

- Arca – vocals, programming, songwriting, production
- Alex Epton – mixing
- Enyang Urbiks – mastering
- HART + LËSHKINA – single artwork
