= Electra Rex =

2021 single by Arca

- Arca at Plaça dels Àngels in the music video

Single by Arca

from the album KicK iii
- Released: 9 November 2021
- Length: 2:08
- Label: XL
- Songwriter: Arca
- Producer: Arca

Arca singles chronology
"Prada/Rakata" (2021)	"Electra Rex" (2021)	"Queer" (2021)

Music video
- "Electra Rex" on YouTube

"Electra Rex" is a song by Venezuelan musician and record producer Arca. XL Recordings released it on 9 November 2021 as the second single from her sixth studio album, KicK iii (2021), following "Incendio". The single accompanied Arca's announcement of the album and its twelve-song track listing. She wrote and produced the recording, supplied its vocals and programming, and worked with mixing engineer Alex Epton and mastering engineer Enyang Urbiks.

The title combines Oedipus Rex with the Electra complex to name a character that Arca had discussed since 2020 as one of her "self-states". In Arca's account, Electra Rex is a non-binary character who "kills both parents and has sex with itself", then chooses to live. Arca set dance instructions and explicit sexual lyrics against a reverberant trap beat that develops into syncopated, metallic percussion.

Arca and Carlota Guerrero co-directed the accompanying music video, which was filmed at Plaça dels Àngels in Barcelona and released with the single. The performers begin with ballroom walks and voguing, then gather around Arca in a mass of bodies. Reviews of KicK iii often singled out the song: Zach Tippitt of Resident Advisor considered it the clearest expression of Arca's experimentalist persona on the album, and The Skinny included it among the four-album collection's recommended tracks.

== Background and release ==
Arca introduced the name Electra Rex in June 2020, during promotion for KiCk i and her early discussions of the records that would follow it. She conceived the Kick series as an electronic opera in which each album would address a different part of her work. Within that plan, recurring personae served as self-states through which different moods could speak. Electra Rex belonged to this cast, and Arca associated the character with the protection she felt when imagining a shiny, impenetrable exoskeleton. At that stage, the third Kick was the least defined volume. The finished album centred on experimental club music and the IDM that Arca had heard during her youth.

Arca issued "Incendio" on 27 September 2021. On 9 November, she announced KicK iii, confirmed that "Incendio" would appear on it and released "Electra Rex" as its second single. The announcement followed the double single "Prada/Rakata", which had introduced KICK ii one week earlier. XL initially scheduled both albums for 3 December. KicK iii arrived on 1 December as the second of four Arca albums released on consecutive days. On the album, the two-minute, eight-second song appears sixth, between "Skullqueen" and "Ripples".

== Composition and lyrics ==
"Electra Rex" (2021)
The opening features a cavernous trap beat, introducing the rhythmic density developed across the track.

"Electra Rex" begins with a cavernous trap beat, then introduces increasingly syncopated percussion. Metallic drum sounds accumulate as the recording proceeds, and the closing passage combines warped bass with sounds resembling twisted metal. Arca's distorted voice and thin, high synthesiser notes enter this rhythmic arrangement as additional percussive elements. These additions produce the repeated changes in density that Tippitt characterised as fluid and unpredictable.

The lyrics begin as commands to dance and become sexually explicit as the track gathers force. Arca then repeats the question "Should I blow?", delaying its resolution until the final burst of percussion. Her voice undergoes pronounced changes in pitch during this passage, moving between intelligible phrases and sounds that merge with the beat.

The title supplies the song with a character drawn from two psychoanalytic narratives. It joins Oedipus Rex, whose story gave the Oedipus complex its name, with the Electra complex. Arca assigned the deaths of both parents to a single non-binary figure who subsequently has sex with itself and survives. She described this survival as an escape from the tragic conclusions associated with the two parent–child narratives.

In a 2024 study of KicK iii, researcher Javier Rivera placed the song's sexual language within the album's recurring treatment of sex, violence and bodily transformation. He argued that dissonance, repetition, deferral and unstable pitch create anxious anticipation across the record. In "Electra Rex", the unanswered question performs the same function as the album's sudden stops by postponing the expected release.

== Critical reception ==
Several reviews singled out "Electra Rex" in their assessments of KicK iii. Tippitt chose it as the track that best captured Arca's experimentalist and live performer persona, citing its unpredictable changes in atmosphere. James Rettig located the album's "fever pitch" at the song's opening dance command and traced its repeated sexual question to the rhythmic outburst that follows. Wade paired the song with "Skullqueen", finding that their movement between calm passages and destructive force made both tracks effective, and selected "Electra Rex" as one of the collection's recommended songs.

Commentary on the recording's club sound placed it within the album's broader musical approach. E. R. Pulgar summarised Electra Rex with the phrase "intellectual rave" in Crack Magazine. Guido Farnell of The Music grouped "Electra Rex" with "Bruja" and "Señorita" on the basis of their clangorous beats, and identified Arca's high vocal register as another feature shared across the album. Ed Power of Hot Press addressed the song's premise and wrote that it could appear serious or pretentious depending on the listener. He considered knowledge of the concept unnecessary for hearing the album.

== Music video ==
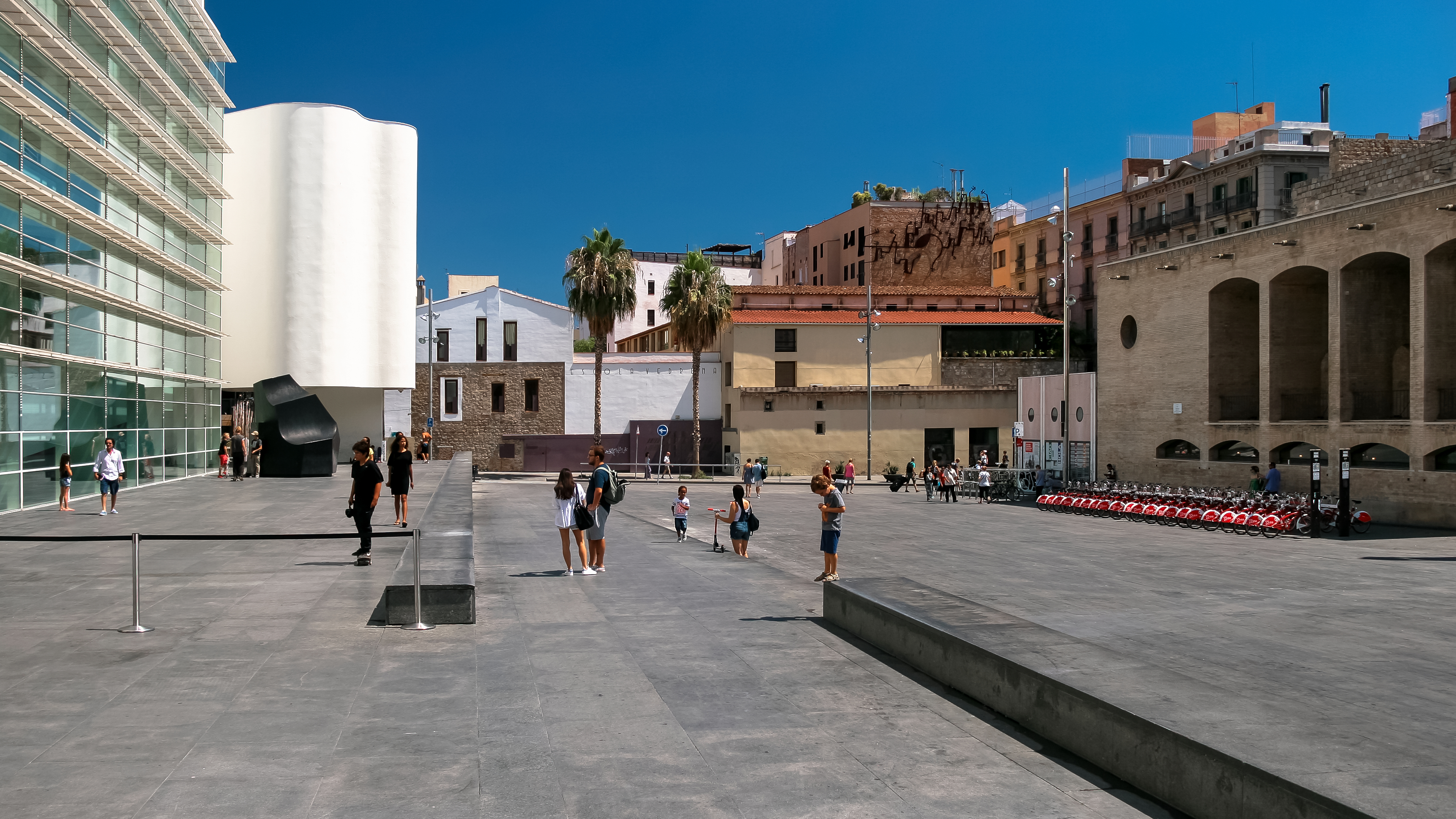
Plaça dels Àngels, where the music video was filmed

Arca and Carlota Guerrero directed the music video at Plaça dels Àngels, the square outside the Barcelona Museum of Contemporary Art, in September 2020. It premiered with the single on 9 November 2021. The catalogue of the 68th International Short Film Festival Oberhausen lists it as a 2021 Spanish–British production in English, shot in colour, with a running time of two minutes and thirty-eight seconds.

The video opens with individual poses and walks across the square. The performers then make close contact, with Arca among them, and gradually converge into a compact group. After the music ends, the recording continues briefly as a woman returns the camera, bringing the performance to an informal close.

The final seconds continue after the music has ended, showing a woman returning the camera.

The video's progression from individual poses to physical contact informed critical readings of its imagery. Paper contrasted its low-fidelity photography with the polished computer-generated work that Frederik Heyman had made for other parts of the Kick project, and interpreted the gathering as radical intimacy and queer dominance. Tippitt associated the dancers' changing formation with the music: they spread across the square, close ranks and separate again as the song changes in density.

== Personnel ==
Credits are taken from Apple Music.

- Arca – vocals, programming, songwriting, production
- Alex Epton – mixing
- Enyang Urbiks – mastering
