= UK music charts =

List of music charts in the United Kingdom

The UK music charts are a collection of charts that reflect the music-buying habits of people within the United Kingdom. Most of them are produced by the Official Charts Company.

== Main charts ==
=== All-genre charts ===
- UK singles chart - The official singles chart of the United Kingdom. It uses physical and download sales, and (since July 2014) a factor for audio streams.
- UK Albums Chart - The official albums chart of the United Kingdom. It uses physical and download sales, and (since March 2015) a factor for audio streams.
- The EE Official Big Top 40 From Global - Non-OCC singles chart introduced in 2009, compiled from iTunes sales, Apple Music streams and Global radio airplay.
- UK Singles Downloads Chart - Singles chart based purely on downloads. Introduced in 2004.
- UK Album Downloads Chart - Albums chart based purely on downloads. Introduced in 2006.
- Official Audio Streaming Chart - Chart based purely on song plays on digital streaming services.
- Official Albums Streaming Chart - Chart based purely on album plays on digital streaming services.
- Official Physical Singles Chart - Chart based purely on physical single sales.
- Official Music Video Chart - Chart based purely on the UK's biggest music videos of the week, based on sales of DVDs, Blu-rays and other physical formats.
- Official Vinyl Singles Chart - Chart of the biggest selling vinyl singles.
- Official Vinyl Albums Chart - Chart of the biggest selling vinyl albums.
- Scottish Singles Chart - Regional chart. Reflects how sales towards the UK Singles Chart are faring in Scotland.
- Scottish Albums Chart - Regional chart. Reflects how sales towards the UK Albums Chart are faring in Scotland.
- UK Independent Singles Charts - Chart of the biggest selling independent singles.
- UK Independent Albums Chart - Chart of the biggest selling independent albums.
- Official Soundtrack Albums Chart - Chart of the biggest selling film/TV soundtrack and musical theatre albums.

=== Afrobeats ===
- Official Afrobeats Chart - Chart of the biggest selling Afrobeats and Afroswing songs.

=== Asian ===
- Asian Music Chart - Chart of the biggest selling Asian singles.
- Official Punjabi Music Chart - Chart of the biggest selling punjabi singles.

=== Classical ===
- Official Classical Artist Albums Chart - Chart of the biggest selling classical music albums which have 60% or more of their playing time dedicated to "classical or traditional" music.
- Official Specialist Classical Chart - Chart of the biggest selling specialist classical albums which have all of their playing time dedicated to "classical or traditional" music.
- Official Classical Compilation Albums Chart - Chart of the biggest selling classical music compilation albums.

=== Country/Roots ===
- Official Americana Albums Chart - Chart of the biggest selling Americana albums.
- Official Country Artists Albums Chart - Chart of the biggest selling country music albums.
- Official Country Compilations Chart - Chart of the biggest selling country music compilation albums.
- Official Folk Albums Chart - Chart of the biggest selling folk music albums.

=== Dance ===
- UK Dance Singles Chart - Chart of the biggest selling dance singles.
- UK Dance Albums Chart - Chart of the biggest selling dance albums.

=== Hip Hop/R&B ===
- UK Hip Hop and R&B Singles Chart - Chart of the biggest selling hip hop and R&B singles
- UK Hip Hop and R&B Albums Chart - Chart of the biggest selling hip hop and R&B albums.

=== Jazz/Blues/Gospel ===
- Official Jazz & Blues Albums Chart - Chart of the biggest selling jazz and blues albums.
- Official Christian & Gospel Albums Chart - Chart of the most popular christian and gospel albums in the UK.

=== Rock/Metal ===
- UK Rock & Metal Singles Chart - Chart of the biggest selling rock and heavy metal singles.
- UK Rock & Metal Albums Chart - Chart of the biggest selling rock and heavy metal albums.

=== Other charts ===
Further genre, format and regional charts are produced by OCC and other compilers.

Classic FM introduced a classical music chart and the annual Classic FM Hall of Fame. In response, BBC Radio 3 introduced a specialist classical chart that lists only "serious" classics, and devoted some of its Tuesday morning programming to this chart.

On March 10, 2024, the UK Country Airplay chart debuted, the first ever genre-specific airplay chart. Monitored by Radiomonitor and the UK wing of the Country Music Association, chart rankings collate information from a range of participating radio stations to identify the most listened to country music single in the UK each week. The chart itself is posted on Holler Country.
