= Numbers (record label) =

Scottish record label and club night promoter

Numbers.
- Founded: 2010
- Country of origin: United Kingdom
- Location: Glasgow, Scotland
- Official website: nmbrs.net

Numbers is a record label and club night promoter based in Glasgow, Scotland, originally run by Jack 'Jackmaster' Revill, Rob 'Bobby Cleaver' Mordue, Richard 'Simply Richard' Chater, brothers Calum 'Spencer' Morton and Neil 'Nelson' Morton and Adam 'Goodhand' Rodgers. Numbers began as a club night by that name in Glasgow in 2003 and continues both in Glasgow and elsewhere. The Numbers record label was founded in 2010 with the merger of three Glasgow based labels Wireblock, Dress 2 Sweat and Stuff. It releases music in vinyl and digital file download formats and has done so for numerous acts including Sophie, Rustie, Jamie xx and Jessie Ware.

== History ==
The Numbers record label was formed in 2010 with the combining of three record labels, Wireblock, Dress 2 Sweat and Stuff. Wireblock was run by Jack Revill and brothers Calum and Neil Morton; Dress 2 Sweat was also run by Jack Revill; and Stuff was run by Richard Chater. These labels had released music by Rustie and Hudson Mohawke before they signed to Warp. The first release by Numbers was 'If U Want Me' by Deadboy.

In 2013, Numbers, along with Dedbeat, started a weekender festival called 'Pleasure Principle'.

Revill died in October 2024.

=== Discography ===
- Deadboy – If U Want Me – 12", digital (2010)
- Lazer Sword Presents Low Limit vs. Lando Kal – The Golden Handshake EP – 12", digital (2010)
- Kavsrave – Quotes – 12", digital (2010)
- SRC – Gold Coinz – 12", digital (2010)
- Redinho – Bare Blips – 12", digital (2010)
- Taz – Gold Tooth Grin – 12", digital (2010)
- Mr Mageeka – Different Lekstrix – 12", digital (2010)
- Slackk – Theme EP – 12", digital (2010)
- Jessie Ware & SBTRKT – Nervous – 12", digital (2010)
- Pierre’s Pfantasy Club – Mystery Girl – 12", digital (2011)
- Jamie xx – Far Nearer – 12", digital (2011)
- Roska & Untold – Myth – 12", digital (2011)
- Ill Blu – Meltdown EP – 12", digital (2011)
- Lory D – Strange Days Vol. 1 – 12", digital (2011)
- Redinho – Edge Off EP – 12", digital (2011)
- Deadboy – Here – 12", digital (2011)
- Mosca – Done Me Wrong / Bax – 12", digital (2011)
- Goldffinch – Red Mask – 12", digital (2011)
- Sibian & Faun – I’m Sorry – 12", digital (2011)
- Randomer – Real Talk – 12", digital (2011)
- Kodiak – Spreo Superbus – 12", digital (2012)
- Unspecified Enemies – Multi Ordinal Tracking Unit – 12", digital (2012)
- Lory D – Strange Days Vol. 2 – 12" (2012)
- Deadboy – Blaquewerk – 12", digital (2013)
- Rustie – Triadzz / Slasherr – 12", digital (2013)
- Sophie – Bipp / Elle – 12", digital (2013)
- Sparky – Portland – 12", digital (2013)
- Doc Daneeka – Walk On In – 12", digital (2013)
- Deadboy – Return – 12", digital (2014)
- Darq E Freaker – Minger – 12", digital (2014)
- Doc Daneeka – Treptow – 12", digital (2014)
- Sparky – Portland (Tuff City Kids Remixes) – 12", digital (2014)
- Sophie – Lemonade / Hard – 12", digital (2014)
- Redinho – Redinho – 12", digital (2014)
- Deejay Deer – Natur – 12", digital (2014)
- Unspecified Enemies – Everything You Did Has Already Been Done – 12", digital (2014)
- Lory D – Strange Days Vol. 3 – 12" (2015)
- DJ Deeon – Deeon Doez Deeon! – 12", digital (2015)
- Adesse Versions – Pride – 12" (2015)
- Sparky - Signals -12", digital (2015)
- Dukwa – Shattered In A Thousand Pieces – 12" (2017)
- Sophie – Product 10th aniversary – 12" (2025)

== Artists ==
Artists whose music has been released by Numbers, Stuff, Wireblock or Dress 2 Sweat include:

- Adesse Versions
- Darq E Freaker
- Deadboy
- Doc Daneeka
- Dukwa
- Ghosts on Tape
- GoldFFinch
- Hudson Mohawke
- Ill Blu
- Jamie xx
- Kavsrave
- Kazey and Bulldog
- Kodiak
- Lazer Sword
- Lory D
- Mosca
- Mr Mageeka
- Randomer
- Redinho
- Rustie
- Sibian + Faun
- Sophie
- Sparky
- SRC
- Taz

== See also ==
- LuckyMe
