= Official Vinyl Singles Chart =

UK Weekly Record Chart

The Official Vinyl Singles Chart is a weekly record chart in the United Kingdom. It is compiled by the Official Charts Company (OCC) on behalf of the music industry. It lists the top 40 most popular singles in the vinyl format each week. The chart, along with the corresponding Official Vinyl Albums Chart, was launched on 6 April 2015 to coincide with Record Store Day, and was introduced in response to the major rise in popularity of vinyl records, both singles and albums; 2014 saw 1.3 million vinyl albums sold in the UK for the first time since 1995.

Martin Talbot, chief executive of the Official Charts Company, said: "We're delighted to launch the UK’s first Official Vinyl Albums and Official Vinyl Singles charts on OfficialCharts.com, to coincide with Record Store Day this coming weekend. With vinyl album sales up by almost 70% already this year, vinyl junkies could well have snapped up 2 million units by the end of this year – an extraordinary number, if you consider sales were one-tenth of that just six years ago. This growth underlines the continuing resurgence of this much-loved format, whether you're a fan of Arctic Monkeys, Noel Gallagher, Led Zeppelin or David Bowie."

On 12 April 2015, "Baby Wants to Ride" by Frankie Knuckles became the first number one on the Official Vinyl Singles Chart. It was a tribute to Knuckles as it was the first anniversary of his death.

== Best-selling vinyl singles by year ==
Year	Single	Artist	Record label	Ref.
2015	"The Dying of the Light"	Noel Gallagher's High Flying Birds	Sour Mash	
2016	"All for One"	The Stone Roses	EMI	
2017	No Plan	David Bowie	Columbia	
2018	"It's a Beautiful World"	Noel Gallagher's High Flying Birds	Sour Mash	
2019	"Last Christmas"	Wham!	RCA	
2020	"All You're Dreaming Of"	Liam Gallagher	Warner	
2021	"Ghost Town"	The Specials	Chrysalis	
2022	"God Save the Queen"	Sex Pistols	Virgin	
2023	"Now and Then"	The Beatles	Apple	
2024	"Just Another Rainbow"	Liam Gallagher and John Squire	Warner	
2025	"Whatever"	Oasis	Big Brother	

== See also ==
- List of Official Vinyl Singles Chart number ones of the 2010s
- List of Official Vinyl Singles Chart number ones of the 2020s
